= John Judah Glass =

Canadian politician (1895–1973)

Ontario MPP
- In office 1934–1943
- Preceded by: Ephraim Frederick Singer
- Succeeded by: J.B. Salsberg
- Constituency: St. Andrew

Personal details
- Born: October 31, 1895; Lachva, Russia
- Died: September 21, 1973 (aged 77); Toronto, Ontario
- Political party: Liberal
- Spouse: Anne Ethel Horowitz
- Occupation: Lawyer

John Judah Glass (October 31, 1895 – September 21, 1973) was a politician in Ontario, Canada. He represented St. Andrew in the Legislative Assembly of Ontario from 1934 to 1943 as a Liberal member.

== Background ==
Glass was born in Lachva, Russia. The son of Morris Glass and Pearl Chafers, he came to Canada in 1907. Glass was educated in Toronto, at Toronto University and Osgoode Hall. He served in the Canadian Expeditionary Force during World War I. Glass was called to the bar in 1920. In 1929, he married Anne Ethel Horowitz.

== Politics ==
He served on the Board of Education and was a Toronto alderman from 1931 to 1934. Glass ran unsuccessfully for a seat in the Ontario legislative assembly in 1929. He was elected in 1934 as a Liberal and served in the Ontario legislature until 1943 when he was defeated by J. B. Salsberg of the Labor-Progressive Party.

In 1932, while on city council, Glass was chairman of the city's parks commission, he attempted to eliminate "Gentiles only" signs by forbidding the erection of any signs on city property without the commission's approval.

=== Provincial election results: St. Andrew ===
1934 Ontario general election
| Party | Candidate | Votes | Vote % |
|---|---|---|---|
| Liberal | J.J. Glass | 5,841 | 42.4 |
| Conservative | E. Frederick Singer | 4,441 | 32.3 |
| Communist | Meyer Klig | 1,959 | 14.2 |
| Independent-Liberal | Claude Pierce | 1,338 | 9.7 |
| Independent-Conservative | J.N. Day | 186 | 1.4 |
| | Total | 13,765 | |

1937 Ontario general election
| Party | Candidate | Votes | Vote % |
|---|---|---|---|
| Liberal | J.J. Glass | 6,481 | 38.6 |
| Labour | Joseph B. Salsberg | 6,302 | 37.6 |
| Conservative | Nathan Phillips | 3,097 | 18.5 |
| Co-operative Commonwealth | Harry Simon | 890 | 5.3 |
| | Total | 16,770 | |

1943 Ontario general election
| Party | Candidate | Votes | Vote % |
|---|---|---|---|
| Labor–Progressive | Joseph B. Salsberg | 7,434 | 53.6 |
| Conservative | John Grudeff | 2,452 | 17.7 |
| Liberal | J.J. Glass | 2,284 | 16.5 |
| Co-operative Commonwealth | Murray Cotterill | 1,689 | 12.2 |
| | Total | 13,859 | |
