= Ted Jolliffe =

Canadian politician and lawyer (1909–1998)

Ted Jolliffe QC
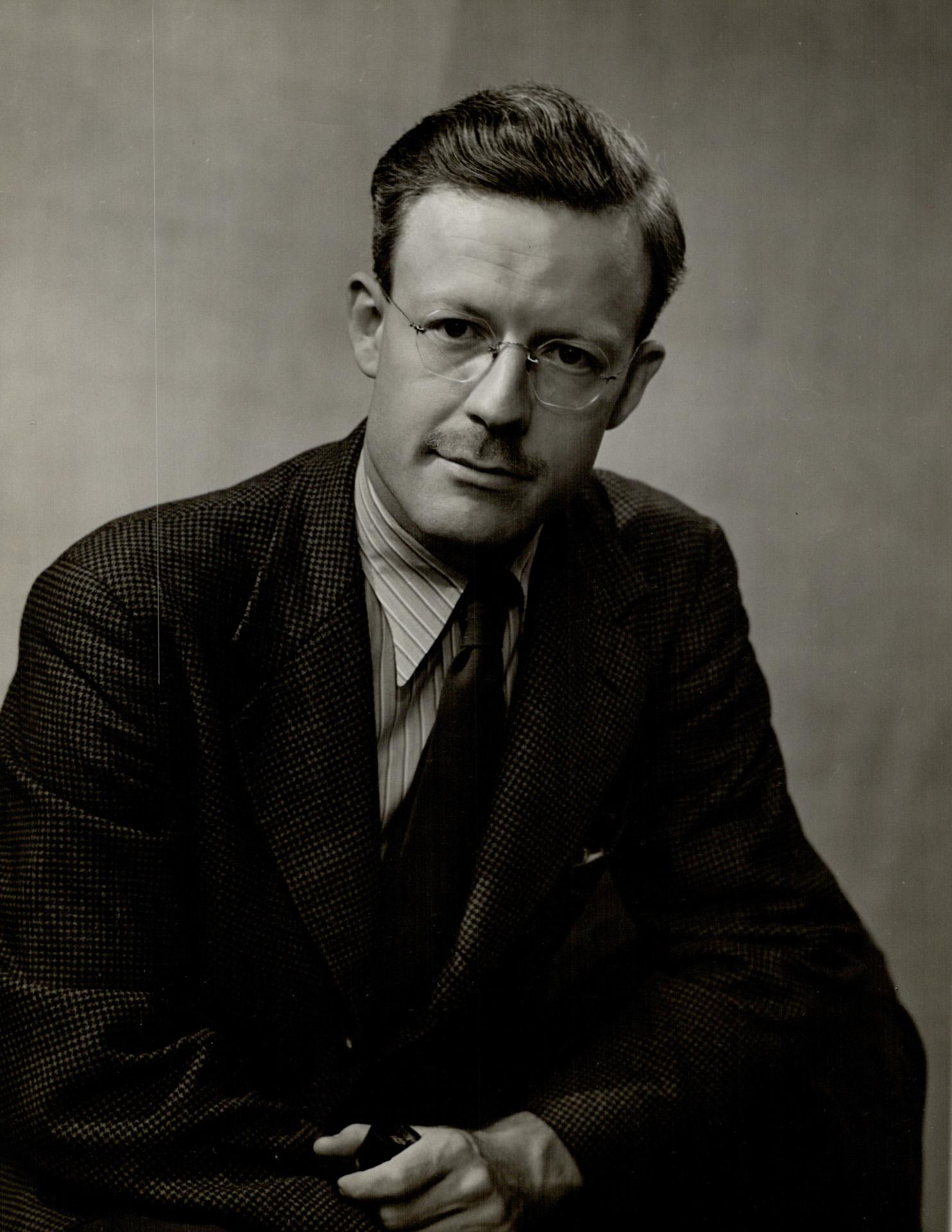
- Jolliffe, c. 1945

Leader of the Ontario CCF
- In office 1942–1953
- Preceded by: Samuel Lawrence (as CCF president)
- Succeeded by: Donald C. MacDonald

Member of Provincial Parliament for York South
- In office June 7, 1948 – November 22, 1951
- Preceded by: Howard Julian Sale
- Succeeded by: William George Beech
- In office August 4, 1943 – June 4, 1945
- Preceded by: Leopold Macaulay
- Succeeded by: Howard Julian Sale

Personal details
- Born: Edward Bigelow Jolliffe; March 2, 1909 Luchow, China
- Died: March 18, 1998 (aged 89) Salt Spring Island, British Columbia
- Party: Co-operative Commonwealth Federation
- Spouse: Ruth Conger Jolliffe (née Moore)
- Children: Naomi, John, Nancy and Thomas
- Occupation: Lawyer

Edward Bigelow Jolliffe QC (March 2, 1909 – March 18, 1998) was a Canadian democratic socialist politician and lawyer from Ontario. He was the first leader of the Ontario section of the Co-operative Commonwealth Federation (CCF) and leader of the Official Opposition in the Ontario Legislature during the 1940s and 1950s. He was a Rhodes Scholar in the mid-1930s, and came back to Canada to help the CCF, after his studies were complete and being called to the bar in England and Ontario. After politics, he practised labour law in Toronto and would eventually become a labour adjudicator. In retirement, he moved to British Columbia, where he died in 1998.

== Early life and education ==
His family had lived in Ontario for generations. His parents, the Reverend Charles and Gertrude Jolliffe, were missionaries for the Methodist Church of Canada, and were living near what was then known as Luchow, China. Edward Bigelow Jolliffe was born at the Canadian Missionary hospital in Luchow, near Chunking on March 2, 1909. He was home-schooled in China by his mother until his early teens. When his family returned to Ontario, he attend Rockwood Public School and then went to high school at Guelph Collegiate Institute.

He was an undergraduate at the University of Toronto's Victoria College, the United Church College. He became the head of the Victoria Student Council, and was a member of the Hart House Debates Committee.

In 1930, he won the Maurice Cody scholarship, and then became one of Ontario's Rhodes Scholars that same year. He attended Christ Church, Oxford University for three years. As a member of Oxford's Labour Club, he met David Lewis, the club's leader and a fellow Canadian. Together they fought the Communist Red October club and fascists such as Lord Haw-Haw–William Joyce.

Both he and Lewis planned a 'silent' protest at Joyce's February 1934 speech at Oxford. They carefully made sure that enough members from the Labour Club attended the meeting, and then in groups of two or three, strategically walked out of the speech, across the creaking wooden floors, effectively blotting out Joyce's speech. The Blackshirts in the audience then caused riots in the street after the meeting and Jolliffe and Lewis were in the thick of it.

His Oxford experiences made him a socialist and he joined the Co-operative Commonwealth Federation shortly after it was formed in 1932 during his summer vacation. He helped form an overseas branch of the CCF at Oxford that year. He was called to the bar in England, and was the first Canadian to win the Arden scholarship. When Jolliffe permanently returned from Oxford, he worked as the CCF's Ontario organizer. He was called to the bar in Ontario and practised law in Toronto from 1938 onwards.

He was a candidate in the 1935 Canadian election in the Toronto riding of St. Paul's, placing fourth. He ran again in the 1940 federal election, this time in the York East electoral district. He was noted for calling out the former federal Conservative government for neglecting World War I soldiers on their return home, and that this time, "proper measures be taken to protect the future of Canadian soldiers and their dependents." He countered that a C.C.F. government would stop war profiteering and the protect the interests of the country's soldiers and "small taxpayers." He was soundly defeated, like every other Ontario CCF candidate, placing a distant third.

== Leader and 1943 election ==
Jolliffe became the first political leader of the Ontario CCF on April 3, 1942, at the party's annual convention. The 1943 Ontario general election proved to be a peak period for him and the party as he led the CCF to within five seats of victory with 34 seats and 32% of the vote. That election brought in a new Conservative minority government under George Drew. After the election, the Conservatives began an over 40-year-dynasty governing Ontario. Jolliffe won the York South seat, and became its Member of Provincial Parliament (MPP) as well as the new leader of the Official Opposition.

Elections to the 21st Parliament of Ontario (1943)
| Political party | Party leader | MPPs | | | | | Votes | | |
| Political party | Party leader | Candidates | 1937 | Dissol. | 1943 | ± | # | % | ± (pp) |
|---|---|---|---|---|---|---|---|---|---|
| Progressive Conservative | George Drew | 90 | 23 | 19 | 38 | 15▲ | 469,672 | 35.75% | 3.69▼ |
| Co-operative Commonwealth | Ted Jolliffe | 86 | – | – | 34 | 34▲ | 415,441 | 31.62% | 26.30▲ |
| Liberal | Harry Nixon | 89 | 62 | 59 | 15 | 51▼ | 399,185 | 30.38% | 20.65▼ |
| Liberal–Progressive (Note: Roland Patterson (Grey North), Thomas Aston Blakelock (Halton) and Douglas Munro Campbell (Kent East) ran as Liberal candidates in 1943.) | | – | 3 | 2 | – | 51▼ | – | – | 20.65▼ |
| United Farmers (Note: Farquhar Oliver (Grey South) became a Liberal on February 24, 1941, upon joining the Cabinet.) | | – | 1 | – | – | 51▼ | – | – | 20.65▼ |
| Labour (Note: A. A. MacLeod (Bellwoods) and J. B. Salsberg (St. Andrew) were elected under the Labour ticket, but switched to the new Labor-Progressive Party on its formation shortly after the election.) | | 2 | – | – | 2 | 2▲ | 11,888 | 0.90% | 0.15▲ |
| Independent Liberal (Note: Morrison Mann MacBride (Brantford) died in June 1938. Mitchell Hepburn (Elgin) opted not to run as a Liberal candidate in 1943.) | | 4 | 1 | – | 1 | Steady | 10,123 | 0.77% | 0.55▼ |
| Independent Labour | | 2 | – | – | – | | 2,215 | 0.17% | 0.16▲ |
| Independent | | 3 | – | – | – | | 2,540 | 0.19% | 0.06▼ |
| Independent-CCF | | 1 | – | – | – | | 1,566 | 0.12% | New |
| Socialist Labor | | 3 | – | – | – | | 740 | 0.06% | 0.08▼ |
| Soldier | | 2 | – | – | – | | 569 | 0.04% | New |
| Vacant | | | | 10 | | | | | |
| Total | | 282 | 90 | 90 | 90 | | 1,313,939 | 100.00% | |
| Blank and invalid ballots | | | | | | | 10,746 | | |
| Registered voters / turnout | | | | | | | 2,269,895 | 58.36% | 12.93▼ |

Seats and popular vote by party
| Party | Seats | Votes | Change (pp) |
|---|---|---|---|
| █ Progressive Conservative | 38 / 90 | 35.75% | -3.69 |
| █ Co-operative Commonwealth | 34 / 90 | 31.62% | 26.30 |
| █ Liberal/Lib-Prog/UFO | 15 / 90 | 30.38% | -20.65 |
| █ Other | 3 / 90 | 2.41% | -1.96 |

== 1945 "Gestapo" campaign ==
In the 1945 Ontario election, Drew ran an anti-Semitic, union bashing, Red-baiting campaign. The previous two years of anti-socialist attacks by the Conservatives and their supporters, like Gladstone Murray and Montague A. Sanderson, were devastatingly effective against the previously popular CCF. Much of the source material for the anti-CCF campaign came from the Ontario Provincial Police(OPP)'s Special Investigation Branch's agent D-208: Captain William J. Osbourne-Dempster. His office was supposed to be investigating war-time 5th column saboteurs. Instead, starting in November 1943, he was investigating, almost exclusively, Ontario opposition MPPs, mainly focusing on the CCF caucus. The fact that Jolliffe knew about these 'secret' investigations as early as February 1944 led to one of the most infamous incidents in 20th-century Canadian politics.

=== May 24, 1945 radio speech ===
As can be discerned from the previous description, the 1945 campaign was anything but genteel and polite. Jolliffe replied by giving a radio speech—written with the assistance of Lister Sinclair— that accused Drew of running a political Gestapo in Ontario. In the speech excerpt below, Jolliffe alleged that a secret department of the Ontario Provincial Police was acting as a political police – spying on the opposition and the media.

It is my duty to tell you that Colonel Drew is maintaining in Ontario, at this very minute, a secret political police, a paid government spy organization, a Gestapo to try and keep himself in power. And Col[onel] Drew maintains his secret political police at the expense of the taxpayers of Ontario – paid out of the Public Funds... Now all through this election campaign, you've been hearing that the real issue is freedom versus dictatorship.... And I quite agree; there certainly is a very grave danger; and when you've heard all the facts, true facts, supported by affidavits, about Col[onel] Drew's Ontario Gestapo – Well, I'll let you decide for yourselves where the danger of dictatorship is coming from.

The dramatic tone of the speech is Sinclair's, as at the time, he was a dramatist, mostly writing for the Canadian Broadcasting Corporation (CBC). At the time, there was speculation among CCF supporters as to whether or not the speech damaged the party's reputation. But as Gerald Caplan maintains in his book The Dilemma of Canadian Socialism, the CCF was already at 21 percent in popular support in the Gallop poll just prior to the speech. On election day, they received 22 percent of the popular vote, so at best it added an extra percentage point of support. At worst, it did not have an effect, which is highly unlikely.

Jolliffe's inflammatory speech became the main issue of the campaign, and dominated coverage in the media for the rest of the election. Drew, and his Attorney-General Leslie Blackwell vehemently denied Jolliffe's accusations, but the public outcry was too much for them to abate. On May 28, 1945, they appointed a Royal Commission to investigate these charges. Jolliffe's CCF and the Ontario Liberal party wanted the election suspended until the Commission tabled its report. Drew ignored these requests and continued to hold the election on its original date, despite it being many months before the commission's findings could be made available.

=== Election Day, June 4, 1945 ===
Jolliffe's CCF went from 34 seats to 8, but almost garnering the same number of actual votes cast, though their percentage of the popular vote dropped from 32 to 22 percent. Drew, with his attack campaign, successfully drove the voter turn-out up, thereby driving the CCF's percentage and seat totals down.

Monday, June 4, 1945, was one of Ontario's most important elections in the 20th century according to Caplan and David Lewis. It shaped the province for the next 40 years, as the Conservatives won a massive majority in the Legislature, and would remain in government for the next 40 consecutive years.

After going from 34 seats to 8, as Caplan puts it, "June 4 and June 11 [federal election], 1945, proved to be black days in CCF annuals: Socialism was effectively removed from the Canadian political agenda." The CCF would never fully recover from this defeat and would eventually cease as a party and morph into the Ontario New Democratic Party. Only then, and in the 1970s, did a social democratic party attain the popularity it had under Jolliffe in 1943.

For Ted Jolliffe, another election consequence was his tenure as the MPP from York South ended, at least for the time being. He lost the election but did better than any other CCF candidate in Toronto or in the outlying Yorks.

| Party | Leader | 1943 | Elected | % change | Popular vote |
| Party | Leader | 1943 | Elected | % change | % | change |
| Progressive Conservative | George Drew | 38 | 66 | +73.7% | 44.3% | +8.6% |
| Liberal | Mitchell Hepburn | 15 | 11 | -26.7% | 29.8% | -1.4% |
| Liberal-Labour | Mitchell Hepburn | - | 3 | | 29.8% | -1.4% |
| Co-operative Commonwealth | Ted Jolliffe | 34 | 8 | -76.5% | 22.4% | -9.3% |
| Labor–Progressive | Leslie Morris | 2 | 2 | - | 2.4% |
| Liberal Independent | | 1 | - | - |
| Total Seats | | 90 | 90 | - | 100% |

=== LeBel Royal Commission ===
Drew appointed Justice A.M. LeBel as the Royal Commissioner. His terms of reference were restricted to the question of whether Drew was personally responsible for the establishment of "a secret political police organization, for the purpose of collecting, by secret spying, material to be used in attempt to keep him in power." Wider questions like why the OPP, Ontario Civil Servants, were keeping files on MPPs were not allowed.

Jolliffe would act as his own counsel throughout the commission, but was assisted by fellow CCF lawyer, Andrew Brewin. Both he and Brewin were able to establish, from several eyewitnesses, that agent D-208, Dempster, was spying on the CCF. What they could not prove, because they did not have access to the information in 1945, were the letters that Drew wrote to his supporter M.A. (Bugsy) Sanderson suggesting that he would finance any lawsuits or other charges stemming from the information provided by Dempster in his advertisements. Sanderson was, in late 1943 to 1945, along with Gladstone Murray, leading the libelous advertisement campaigns against the CCF in newspapers and bill-boards, with information gleaned from Dempster's briefings. Jolliffe presented several witnesses that claimed to have seen these documents. But Jolliffe could not produce the actual letter, and Drew would deny ever writing it.

On October 11, 1945, Justice LeBel issued his report that essentially exonerated Drew and Blackwell. Due to Jolliffe presenting only circumstantial evidence that linked Drew to Dempster, Murray and Sanderson, the Commissioner found the information unconvincing, even though LeBel believed Dempster's interaction with Sanderson and Murray was inappropriate.

Jolliffe's motives regarding his accusations, as well as his choice of words, would be questioned for many years afterwards. That would change. In the late 1970s, when David Lewis was doing research for his Memoirs he came across archival evidence proving the charge. Due to Lewis's discovery, Drew's son Edward, placed extremely restrictive conditions on his father's papers housed in the Public Archives of Canada that partially continue as of 2025.

As Lewis pointed out in his memoirs, "We found that Premier Drew and Gladstone Murray did not disclose all information to the Lebel Commission; indeed, they deliberately prevaricated throughout. The head of the Government of Ontario had given false witness under testimony.... The perpetrator of Ontario's Watergate got away with it."

== 1946 Hamilton convention ==
In 1946, there was major labour strife in Ontario, and the CCF made it clear they were on the side of the unionists. The party's annual convention was held outside of Toronto for the first time. The convention was held at the Royal Connaught Hotel in Hamilton, Ontario from December 9 to 11, 1946, in the city where the United Steelworkers of America (USWA) went through a long protracted strike about reducing the work-week to 40 hours. Jolliffe faced a leadership challenge at this convention from former Toronto Controller Lewis Duncan. There were rumblings in 1945 that Duncan would take over from Jolliffe, but that was rumoured to be only if he were able to defeat Drew in the High Park constituency, which he failed to do. As party chairman John Mitchell stated at the time, it was not even close, as Jolliffe was easily re-elected CCF leader again for the fourth time.

== 1948 re-elected MPP ==
By April 1948, the CCF were attempting to alter their public image in anticipation of the upcoming election. As a result of the Cold War and the "red scare", the party and labour movement acted to purge individuals — including MPP Robert Carlin — suspected of being under Communist influence. As a consequence of the 1948 Ontario general election, the CCF experienced a resurgence, initially securing 22 seats. The Conservatives lost most of their Toronto-area seats and even premier Drew lost his High Park seat. Consequently, Jolliffe assumed the position of Leader of the Opposition in Ontario and once again became the MPP for York South.

However, the CCF's fortunes soon experienced a decline. Public support for socialism waned, resulting in the CCF's reduction to a mere two seats in the 1951 Ontario general election, with Jolliffe once again losing his seat. On August 17, 1953, he resigned as party leader in order to prioritize his legal practice. A few months later, a leadership convention was held to replace him in Toronto on November 20 and 21, 1953. Donald C. MacDonald was elected the new leader on the second ballot with Jolliffe, and National CCF leader M. J. Coldwell looking on.

== Post MPP career ==
He returned to his previous career as a labour lawyer, a founding partner in the firm Jolliffe, Lewis and Osler with fellow CCF activist and future New Democratic Party leader, David Lewis in 1945. In the 1950s and 1960s, the firm assisted the United Steelworkers union in their fight with the Mine, Mill & Smelter Workers union in Sudbury, Ontario. In 1968, he was appointed Chief Adjudicator under the federal Public Service Staff Relations Act, a position he held until 1978. He then became active as a labour arbitrator until his retirement. In 1972, an historical novel he wrote, entitled The First Hundred: A Novel, was published by McClelland & Stewart Limited.

Ted Jolliffe was the first social democratic leader of the opposition in Ontario's Legislature in 1943. He lived long enough to see Bob Rae and the NDP form the Ontario government in September 1990. He died on March 18, 1998, in Salt Spring Island, British Columbia.

== Electoral record ==
1940 Canadian federal election: York East
| Party | Candidate | Votes |
|---|---|---|
| National Government | Robert Henry McGregor | 16,741 |
| Liberal | Robert Allan Irwin | 12,429 |
| Co-operative Commonwealth | Edward Bigelow (Ted) Jolliffe | 4,931 |

== Sources ==
- Azoulay, Dan (1997). Keeping the Dream Alive: The Survival of the Ontario CCF/NDP, 1950-1963. Montreal: McGill-Queen's University Press. ISBN 0-7735-1634-4.
- Boyko, John (2006). Into the Hurricane: Attacking Socialism and the CCF. Winnipeg, Manitoba, Canada: J. Gordon Shillingford Publishing Inc. ISBN 978-1-897289-09-9.
- Caplan, Gerald (1973). The Dilemma of Canadian Socialism: The CCF in Ontario. Toronto: McClelland and Stewart. ISBN 0-7710-1896-7.
- Lewis, David (1981). The Good Fight: Political Memoirs, 1909-1958. Toronto: Macmillan of Canada. ISBN 0-7715-9598-0.
- MacDonald, Donald C. (1998). The Happy Warrior: Political Memoirs, 2nd Ed. Toronto: Dundurn Press. pp. 292–296. ISBN 1-55002-307-1.
- Smith, Cameron (1989). 'Unfinished Journey: The Lewis Family'. Toronto: Summerhill Press. ISBN 0-929091-04-3.

| Preceded by none | Leader of the Ontario CCF; 1942–1953 | Succeeded by Donald C. Macdonald |
| Preceded by George Drew | Leader of the Opposition in the Ontario Legislature; 1943–1945 | Succeeded by Farquhar Oliver |
| Preceded by Farquhar Oliver | Leader of the Opposition in the Ontario Legislature; 1948–1951 | Succeeded by Farquhar Oliver |
