= Louis Singer =

Louis M. Singer, K.C., (1885–1959 ) was a Toronto lawyer and the second Jewish candidate to win election to Toronto City Council, the first being Newman Leopold Steiner.

Singer was born in Austria in 1885 and immigrated to Canada with his family when he was three years old. He attended Jarvis Collegiate Institute in Toronto and had to pay for his own schooling by selling books and, later, real estate. Lacking enough money to attend university, he sold insurance for a year and then enrolled at Osgoode Hall Law School while continuing to sell fire insurance at night. He graduated in 1908 with first class honours and the gold medal.

He established the law office of Singer and Singer and was elected to Toronto City Council representing Ward 4 in the 1914 municipal election. He was re-elected in 1915, 1916 and 1917 but was defeated in 1918 and returned to his law practice full-time. During the First World War he argued against the disenfranchisement of foreign-born citizens.

Singer was a prominent member of the Jewish community in Toronto. In 1920, he chaired a mass meeting of Toronto Jews in Massey Hall expressing loyalty to the British Empire and giving thanks for Britain accepting the Mandate of Palestine.

Singer was active with the Conservative Party in the 1920s and was a critic of the Ontario Temperance Act. He organized the Hebrew Conservative Association in 1925, serving as its president, in an attempt to promote the Conservative Party in the Jewish community. He split with the organized party in the 1926 election. The Tory leadership had reportedly promised the city's large Catholic and Jewish populations that they would be represented among the Tory candidates, but the party again nominated the same full slate of Protestants. As a result, Singer chose to run in the riding of St. Andrew as an Independent Conservative, opposing the official party nominee William Robertson Flett. Flett won the election, but Singer finished a credible second winning 3,380 votes to Flett's 4,537.
