= 1946 Ontario Co-operative Commonwealth Federation leadership election =

Leadership challenge in the Ontario Co-operative Commonwealth Federation

- Date: 9–11 December 1946
- Convention: Royal Connaught Hotel; Hamilton, Ontario
- Won by: Ted Jolliffe
- Ballots: 1

The 1946 Ontario Co-operative Commonwealth Federation leadership challenge took place during the 13th annual convention of the Ontario Co-operative Commonwealth Federation (CCF), held from 9 to 11 December 1946 at the Royal Connaught Hotel in Hamilton, Ontario. Incumbent leader Ted Jolliffe successfully defeated a leadership challenge from former Toronto Controller Lewis Duncan and was re-elected leader for a fourth consecutive term.

The challenge emerged from internal disagreements that followed the 1945 Ontario general election, in which the Ontario CCF lost much of the support it had gained during its breakthrough campaign of 1943. Critics within the party blamed Jolliffe and national secretary David Lewis for aspects of the election campaign, particularly its emphasis on leadership and the controversy surrounding the so-called "Gestapo affair".

== Background ==
The Ontario CCF entered the 1945 Ontario general election as the Official Opposition and a major challenger to Premier George Drew's Progressive Conservative government. Under Jolliffe's leadership, the party had won 34 seats in the 1943 Ontario general election and had come within a few seats of forming government.

During the campaign, Jolliffe accused Drew's government of operating a secret political surveillance organization, which he described as a "Gestapo" network. Although a royal commission later investigated the allegations, the controversy dominated the closing weeks of the campaign and contributed to divisions within the party after the election.

The CCF lost 26 of its 34 seats and fell to third place behind the Progressive Conservatives and Liberals.

== 1945 election aftermath ==
Following publication of the LeBel Report, the Ontario CCF turned its attention to internal party affairs and its first provincial convention in more than eighteen months.

Held from 22 to 24 November 1945 at the Toronto Labor Lyceum on Spadina Avenue, the convention became a forum for criticism of the party leadership. Jolliffe announced before the gathering that he intended to remain leader despite dissatisfaction among some members over the election result.

Critics charged that the CCF had failed to emphasize policy during the election campaign, that its platform had been too vague and leader-centred, and that labour unions had exercised excessive influence over campaign strategy. Jolliffe was particularly criticized for his handling of the final weeks of the campaign and his "Gestapo" allegations against the Drew government.

The opposition culminated in a motion condemning both Jolliffe and David Lewis. The motion alleged that campaign tactics had been determined by the two men without adequate consultation and that democratic procedures within the party had been ignored. Although the motion was defeated, it demonstrated growing tensions between the party leadership and sections of the socialist rank-and-file.

Delegates unanimously adopted a resolution condemning political surveillance and calling on the Drew government to cease spying on labour and political organizations. University of Toronto professor George Grube was re-elected provincial president and Jolliffe remained leader.

Although Jolliffe survived the convention, speculation regarding a future leadership challenge persisted. Former Toronto Controller Lewis Duncan was frequently mentioned as a possible successor.

Rumours suggested that Duncan might replace Jolliffe if he succeeded in defeating Drew in High Park during the 1945 election. Duncan failed to unseat Drew, weakening his prospects as a leadership alternative.

== Leadership challenge ==
By 1946, Ontario was experiencing significant labour unrest, and the CCF publicly aligned itself with organized labour.

The 1946 convention was the first Ontario CCF annual convention held outside Toronto. Hamilton was selected because of its importance as a centre of organized labour and because it had recently been the site of a lengthy strike by the United Steelworkers of America over the introduction of a forty-hour work week.

Jolliffe used the convention to defend organized labour and argued that workers had achieved important gains despite opposition from employers. He also predicted that a federal election could occur within eighteen months.

When the leadership vote was held, Jolliffe easily defeated Duncan. No official vote totals were released, but party chairman John Mitchell stated that the contest "wasn't even close".

In other convention business, George Grube stepped down as provincial president and was succeeded by lawyer Andrew Brewin, who defeated former York South MP Joseph W. Noseworthy by four votes.

Delegates adopted resolutions supporting local-option liquor plebiscites and condemning the Drew government's legislation permitting cocktail bars in Ontario.

== Aftermath ==
Jolliffe's victory consolidated his position as leader and temporarily ended internal efforts to replace him. The convention demonstrated that despite dissatisfaction among some activists following the 1945 election, a substantial majority of delegates continued to support his leadership.

The Ontario CCF remained a significant political force under Jolliffe and returned to Official Opposition status following the 1948 Ontario general election. Jolliffe remained leader until 1953.

Historians have viewed the 1946 leadership challenge as an important episode in the postwar evolution of the Ontario CCF, exposing tensions between party moderates, labour supporters, and socialist activists while ultimately reaffirming Jolliffe's authority.
