= York South (Ontario provincial electoral district) =

Former provincial electoral district in Ontario, Canada

Ontario electoral district

Defunct provincial electoral district
- Legislature: Legislative Assembly of Ontario
- District created: 1926
- District abolished: 1996
- First contested: 1926
- Last contested: 1995

Demographics
- Census division: Toronto
- Census subdivision: Toronto

York South was a provincial electoral district in Ontario, Canada, that was represented in the Legislative Assembly of Ontario from 1926 to 1999.

== History ==
The provincial riding of York South first came into existence for the 1926 Ontario election. It was slightly smaller than the federal riding but covered much of the same area. For most of the period after World War II, it was a bastion of the Ontario CCF and its successor, the NDP, being the riding of three CCF/NDP leaders in the Ontario legislature, Ted Jolliffe, Donald C. MacDonald and Bob Rae.

When the government of Mike Harris changed Ontario's electoral law so that federal and provincial ridings matched, most of York South was merged into York South—Weston. Smaller portions of the old riding became parts of Parkdale—High Park and Davenport.

== Members of Provincial Parliament ==
York South
| Assembly | Years | Member | Party |
|---|---|---|---|
Riding created from York North
| 17th | 1926–1929 | Leopold Macaulay | Conservative |
| 18th | 1929–1934 | Leopold Macaulay | Conservative |
| 19th | 1934–1937 | Leopold Macaulay | Conservative |
| 20th | 1937–1943 | Leopold Macaulay | Conservative |
| 21st | 1943–1945 | Ted Jolliffe | Co-operative Commonwealth |
| 22nd | 1945–1948 | Howard Julian Sale | Progressive Conservative |
| 23rd | 1948–1951 | Ted Jolliffe | Co-operative Commonwealth |
| 24th | 1951–1955 | William George Beech | Progressive Conservative |
| 25th | 1955–1959 | Donald C. MacDonald (Note: Retired on July 31, 1982 to allow Bob Rae to run.) | Co-operative Commonwealth |
| 26th | 1959–1961 | Donald C. MacDonald | Co-operative Commonwealth |
| 26th | 1961–1963 | Donald C. MacDonald | New Democratic |
| 27th | 1963–1967 | Donald C. MacDonald | New Democratic |
| 28th | 1967–1971 | Donald C. MacDonald | New Democratic |
| 29th | 1971–1975 | Donald C. MacDonald | New Democratic |
| 30th | 1975–1977 | Donald C. MacDonald | New Democratic |
| 31st | 1977–1981 | Donald C. MacDonald | New Democratic |
| 32nd | 1981–1982 | Donald C. MacDonald | New Democratic |
| 32nd | 1982–1985 | Bob Rae (Note: Resigned February 29, 1996.) | New Democratic |
| 33rd | 1985–1987 | Bob Rae | New Democratic |
| 34th | 1987–1990 | Bob Rae | New Democratic |
| 35th | 1990–1995 | Bob Rae | New Democratic |
| 36th | 1995–1996 | Bob Rae | New Democratic |
| 36th | 1996–1999 | Gerard Kennedy | Liberal |
Sourced from the Ontario Legislative Assembly
Dissolved into York South—Weston, Parkdale—High Park and Davenport

== Election results ==
1926 Ontario general election
| Party | Candidate | Votes | Vote % |
|---|---|---|---|
| Conservative | Leopold Macaulay | 10,242 | 66.5 |
| Progressive | Dillon (Note: First name not given in reference.) | 5,162 | 33.5 |
| | Total | 15,404 | |

1929 Ontario general election
| Party | Candidate | Votes | Vote % |
|---|---|---|---|
| Conservative | Leopold Macaulay | 7,280 | 71.4 |
| Liberal | G.W.P. Hood | 2,912 | 28.6 |
| | Total | 10,192 | |

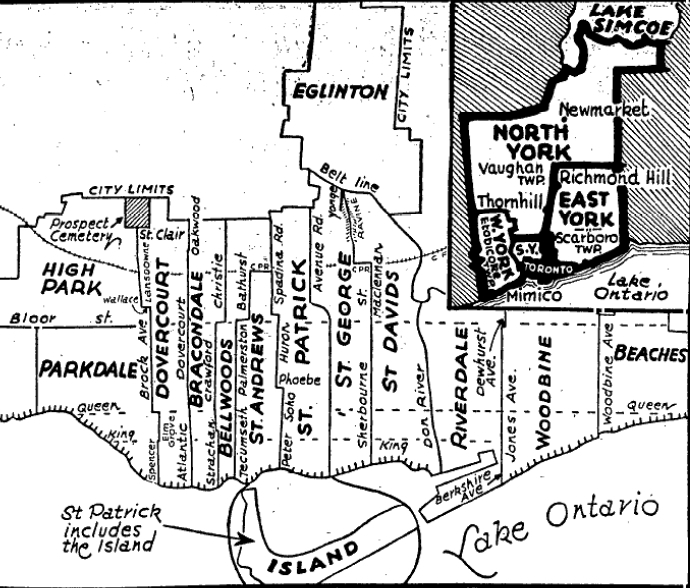
Toronto riding boundaries after 1934 redistribution

1934 Ontario general election
| Party | Candidate | Votes | Vote % |
|---|---|---|---|
| Conservative | Leopold Macaulay | 10,162 | 39.8 |
| Liberal | D.W. Lang | 9,142 | 35.8 |
| Co-operative Commonwealth | Luke Teskey | 5,546 | 21.7 |
| Communist | E.G. Humphries | 706 | 2.8 |
| | Total | 25,556 | |

1937 Ontario general election
| Party | Candidate | Votes (Note: 168 out of 187 polls reporting.) | Vote % |
|---|---|---|---|
| Conservative | Leopold Macaulay | 10,063 | 38.5 |
| Liberal | D.W. Lang | 9,000 | 34.4 |
| Co-operative Commonwealth | Luke Teskey | 6,793 | 26.0 |
| Independent | Hughes | 237 | 0.9 |
| Independent | Debragh | 36 | 0.1 |
| | Total | 26,129 | |

1943 Ontario general election
| Party | Candidate | Votes | Vote % |
|---|---|---|---|
| Co-operative Commonwealth | E.B. Jolliffe | 10,477 | 48.9 |
| Progressive Conservative | G.M. Dix | 8,260 | 38.6 |
| Liberal | Edward Evans | 2,680 | 12.5 |
| | Total | 21,417 | |

1945 Ontario general election
| Party | Candidate | Votes | Vote % |
|---|---|---|---|
| Progressive Conservative | H.G. Sale | 14,002 | 41.3 |
| Co-operative Commonwealth | E.B. Jolliffe | 12,769 | 37.7 |
| Liberal | F.J. MacRae | 5,982 | 17.6 |
| Labor–Progressive | Oscar Brookes | 949 | 2.8 |
| Social Credit | John D. Scott | 211 | 0.6 |
| | Total | 33,913 | |

1948 Ontario general election
| Party | Candidate | Votes | Vote % |
|---|---|---|---|
| Co-operative Commonwealth | E.B. Jolliffe | 19,237 | 49.6 |
| Progressive Conservative | W.S. Gibson | 14,728 | 37.9 |
| Liberal | Ragnar Johnson | 4,848 | 12.5 |
| | Total | 38,813 | |

1951 Ontario general election
| Party | Candidate | Votes | Vote % |
|---|---|---|---|
| Progressive Conservative | William Beech | 13,756 | 39.7 |
| Co-operative Commonwealth | E.B. Jolliffe | 13,140 | 37.9 |
| Liberal | Robert Colucci | 6,855 | 19.8 |
| Labor–Progressive | Norman Penner | 877 | 2.5 |
| | Total | 34,628 | |

1955 Ontario general election
| Party | Candidate | Votes | Vote % |
|---|---|---|---|
| Co-operative Commonwealth | Donald MacDonald | 14,156 | 44.4 |
| Progressive Conservative | William Beech | 12,505 | 39.2 |
| Liberal | Bert Robinson | 4,172 | 13.1 |
| Labor–Progressive | David Kashton | 1,028 | 3.2 |
| | Total | 31,861 | |

1959 Ontario general election
| Party | Candidate | Votes | Vote % |
|---|---|---|---|
| Co-operative Commonwealth | Donald MacDonald | 14,446 | 46.9 |
| Progressive Conservative | Alice Bickerton | 9,133 | 29.7 |
| Liberal | Fred McDermott | 5,508 | 17.9 |
| Independent-Conservative | C.J. Garfunkel | 1,228 | 4.0 |
| Labor–Progressive | Sam Walsh | 454 | 1.5 |
| | Total | 30,769 | |

1963 Ontario general election
| Party | Candidate | Votes | Vote % |
|---|---|---|---|
| New Democrat | Donald MacDonald | 10,529 | 48.0 |
| Progressive Conservative | William Thomson | 6,792 | 30.9 |
| Liberal | Albert Robinson | 4,633 | 21.1 |
| | Total | 21,954 | |

1967 Ontario general election
| Party | Candidate | Votes | Vote % |
|---|---|---|---|
| New Democrat | Donald MacDonald | 13,069 | 64.9 |
| Progressive Conservative | John Holley | 6,792 | 33.7 |
| Liberal | Albert Robinson | 273 | 1.4 |
| | Total | 19,836 | |

1971 Ontario general election
| Party | Candidate | Votes | Vote % |
|---|---|---|---|
| New Democrat | Donald MacDonald | 12,311 | 48.1 |
| Progressive Conservative | Douglas Saunders | 9,524 | 37.2 |
| Liberal | Ed Direnfield | 3,786 | 14.8 |
| | Total | 25,621 | |

1975 Ontario general election
| Party | Candidate | Votes | Vote % |
|---|---|---|---|
| New Democrat | Donald MacDonald | 13,365 | 48.4 |
| Progressive Conservative | James Trimbee | 7,083 | 25.7 |
| Liberal | Alan Tonks | 6,494 | 23.6 |
| Communist | Mike Phillips | 612 | 2.2 |
| | Total | 27,554 | |

1977 Ontario general election
| Party | Candidate | Votes | Vote % |
|---|---|---|---|
| New Democrat | Donald MacDonald | 14,136 | 50.5 |
| Progressive Conservative | Austin Clarke | 7,658 | 27.4 |
| Liberal | Michael E. Kolle | 5,306 | 19. |
| Communist | Mike Phillips | 526 | 1.9 |
| Libertarian | Ken Korentayer | 339 | 1.2 |
| | Total | 27,965 | |

1981 Ontario general election
| Party | Candidate | Votes | Vote % |
|---|---|---|---|
| New Democrat | Donald MacDonald | 9,725 | 37.3 |
| Liberal | Les Green | 8,113 | 31.1 |
| Progressive Conservative | Barbara Jafelice | 7,728 | 29.7 |
| Communist | Mike Phillips | 487 | 1.9 |
| | Total | 26,053 | |

By-election November 4, 1982
| Party | Candidate | Votes | Vote % |
|---|---|---|---|
| New Democrat | Bob Rae | 11,286 | 45.6 |
| Liberal | John Nunziata | 8,732 | 35.3 |
| Progressive Conservative | Barbara Jafelice | 4,410 | 17.8 |
| Libertarian | Myron Petriw | 245 | 1.0 |
| Christian Credit Party | John Turmel | 67 | 0.3 |
| | Total | 24,470 | |

1985 Ontario general election
| Party | Candidate | Votes | Vote % |
|---|---|---|---|
| New Democrat | Bob Rae | 16,465 | 54.3 |
| Liberal | Horace Hale | 6,687 | 22.0 |
| Progressive Conservative | Toomas Ounapua | 5,376 | 17.7 |
| Independent | Paul Schultze | 1,071 | 3.5 |
| Independent | Lucile Beikott | 410 | 1.4 |
| Libertarian | Dusan Kubas | 341 | 1.1 |
| | Total | 30,350 | |

1987 Ontario general election
| Party | Candidate | Votes | Vote % |
|---|---|---|---|
| New Democrat | Bob Rae | 13,147 | 44.1 |
| Liberal | Alan Tonks | 12,907 | 43.3 |
| Progressive Conservative | Fred De Francesco | 3,300 | 11.3 |
| Libertarian | Dusan Kubas | 425 | 1.4 |
| | Total | 29,779 | |

1990 Ontario general election
| Party | Candidate | Votes | Vote % |
|---|---|---|---|
| New Democrat | Bob Rae | 15,802 | 65.6 |
| Liberal | Ozzie Grant | 4,534 | 18.8 |
| Progressive Conservative | Andrew Feldstein | 2,541 | 10.5 |
| Libertarian | Alex MacDonald | 759 | 3.2 |
| Green | Phil Sarazen | 452 | 1.9 |
| | Total | 22,677 | |

1995 Ontario general election
| Party | Candidate | Votes | Vote % |
|---|---|---|---|
| New Democrat | Bob Rae | 10,442 | 41.3 |
| Progressive Conservative | Larry Edwards | 7,726 | 30.6 |
| Liberal | Hagood Hardy | 6,025 | 23.8 |
| Family Coalition | Don Pennell | 305 | 1.2 |
| Green | David James Cooper | 219 | 0.9 |
| Independent | Kevin Clarke | 170 | 0.7 |
| Libertarian | Roma Kelembet | 153 | 0.6 |
| Natural Law | Bob Hyman | 124 | 0.5 |
| Communist | Darrell Rankin | 105 | 0.4 |
| | Total | 25,269 | |

By-election May 23, 1996
| Party | Candidate | Votes | Vote % |
|---|---|---|---|
| Liberal | Gerrard Kennedy | 7,774 | 39.8 |
| New Democrat | David Miller | 6,656 | 34.1 |
| Progressive Conservative | Rob Davis | 5,095 | 26.1 |
| | Total | 19,525 | |

== See also ==
- List of Ontario provincial electoral districts
- Canadian provincial electoral districts
