= Ephraim Frederick Singer =

First Jew elected to the Ontario legislature

E. Frederick Singer

Ontario MPP
- In office 1929–1934
- Preceded by: William Robertson Flett
- Succeeded by: John Judah Glass
- Constituency: St. Andrew

Personal details
- Born: Ephraim Frederick Singer; 19 July 1889 Toronto, Ontario, Canada
- Died: 10 January 1952 (aged 62) Toronto, Ontario
- Party: Conservative
- Spouse: Zelma Gutman
- Children: 3
- Occupation: Lawyer

Ephraim Frederick Singer (19 July 1889 — 10 January 1952) known as E. Frederick Singer was the first Jew elected to the Ontario legislature. He represented the Toronto riding of St. Andrew in the Legislative Assembly of Ontario from 1929 to 1934 as a Conservative member.

Singer's parents, Jacob and Annie Singer, immigrated to Canada from Austria. Jacob Singer was a successful jeweller who invested in real estate. E. Frederick Singer was born in 1889 in Toronto. He attended Harbord Collegiate Institute, and graduated from the University of Toronto in 1909 with a BA and in 1912 from Osgoode Hall Law School with a law degree. He entered the practice of law with his brother, Abraham, who was called to the bar in the same year. Singer was a founder and the first president of Mount Sinai Hospital in Toronto. He was nominated by the Conservative Party in the largely immigrant riding of St. Andrew for the 1929 Ontario general election and was elected to the provincial legislature. In office, he was the first Jewish politician to promote anti-discrimination legislation. In 1931, he proposed an amendment to the Insurance Act that prohibited discriminatory practices from insurance companies. He introduced the measure after his own insurance policy was cancelled after he inquired about his insurance company charging higher premiums of Jewish clients, or refusing them policies outright. The law was passed in 1932 and was the first human rights legislation approved in Canada, however it proved to be unenforceable. He was defeated in the 1934 Ontario general election by Liberal candidate John Judah Glass.

== Electoral results: St. Andrew ==
1929 Ontario general election
Party	Candidate	Votes	Vote %
Conservative	E. Frederick Singer	3,177	63.6
Liberal	J.J. Glass	1,816	36.4
	Total	4,993	

1934 Ontario general election
Party	Candidate	Votes	Vote %
Liberal	J.J. Glass	5,841	42.4
Conservative	E. Frederick Singer	4,441	32.3
Communist	Meyer Klig	1,959	14.2
Independent-Liberal	Claude Pierce	1,338	9.7
Independent-Conservative	J.N. Day	186	1.4
	Total	13,765	
