= Karin Larsen =

Karin Larsen may refer to:

- Britt Karin Larsen (born 1945), Norwegian poet
- Karin Larsen (broadcaster) (born 1963), Canadian CBC television newscaster and former Olympic synchronized swimmer
- Karin Larsen (Communist Party candidate), Canadian political candidate
