= 1945 Ontario general election =

Canadian provincial election

- June 4, 1945

90 seats in the 22nd Legislative Assembly of Ontario 46 seats were needed for a majority
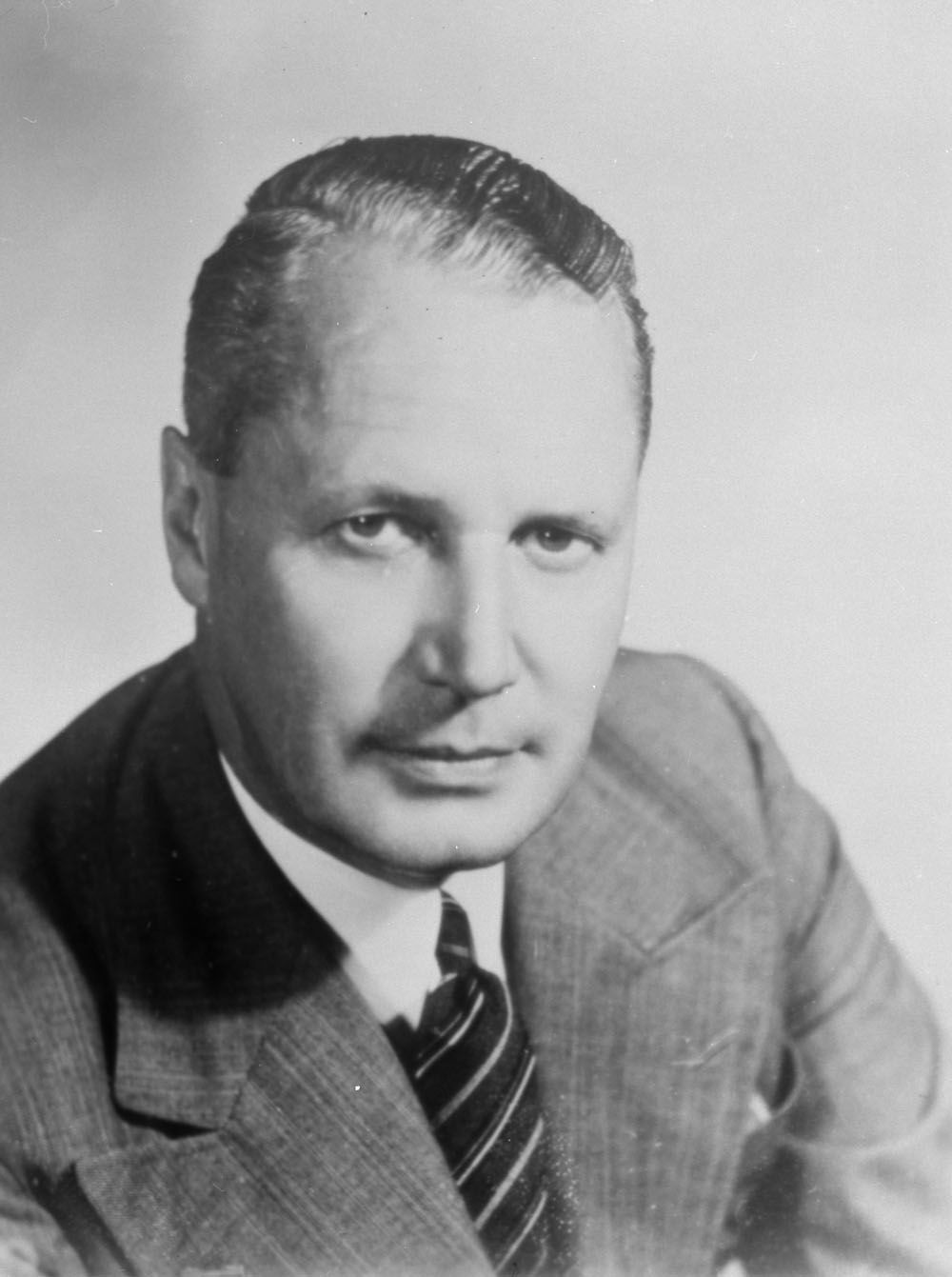

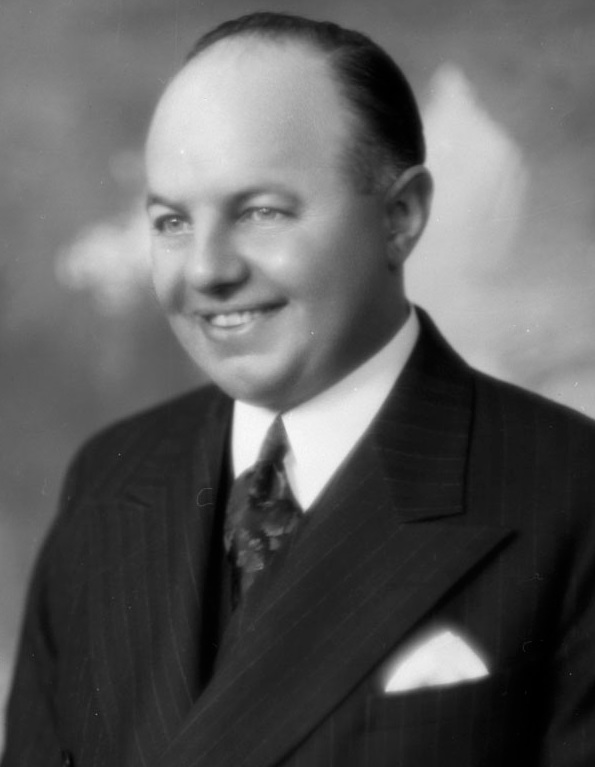

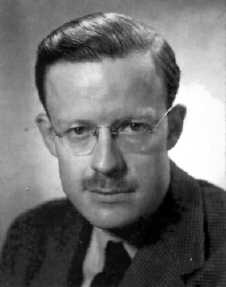
	First party	Second party
Leader	George Drew	Mitchell Hepburn
Party	Progressive Conservative	Liberal
Leader since	December 9, 1938	April 2, 1945
Leader's seat	High Park	Elgin (lost re-election)
Last election	38	15
Seats won	66	14
Seat change	▲28	▼1
Percentage	44.3%	29.8%
Swing	▲8.6pp	▼1.4pp
	Third party	Fourth party
		LP
Leader	Ted Jolliffe	Leslie Morris
Party	Co-operative Commonwealth	Labor-Progressive
Leader since	April 3, 1942	1945
Leader's seat	York South (lost re-election)	Ran in Bracondale (Lost)
Last election	34	2
Seats won	8	2
Seat change	▼26	±0
Percentage	22.4%	2.4%
Swing	▼9.3pp	▲1.5pp
Premier before election
George Drew
Progressive Conservative
Premier after election
George Drew
Progressive Conservative

The 1945 Ontario general election was held on June 4, 1945, to elect the 90 members of the 22nd Legislative Assembly of Ontario (Members of Provincial Parliament, or "MPPs") of the province of Ontario.

== Background ==
The Legislature was dissolved on March 24, 1945, upon the government's failure to defeat a non-confidence motion. The election call was delayed in order to implement new legislation relating to the collection of votes from servicemen and women overseas, but the date was later fixed for June 11. When the 1945 Canadian federal election was set for the same date, the Ontario date was accelerated by one week to June 4, in order to separate the two campaigns.

The Drew government called the election in an attempt to get a majority government. By exploiting increasing Cold War tensions, the PC Party was able to defeat Jolliffe's CCF by stoking fears about communism. Jolliffe replied by giving a radio speech (written by Lister Sinclair) that accused Drew of running a political gestapo in Ontario, alleging that a secret department of the Ontario Provincial Police was acting as a political police spying on the opposition and the media. This accusation led to a backlash, and loss of support for the CCF, including the loss of Jolliffe's own seat of York South. This probably helped Drew win his majority, although in the 1970s, archival evidence was discovered proving the charge.

== Campaign ==
Of the 90 ridings, only 8 had two-way races; 47 were three-way contests, and the Labor-Progressives forced 30 four way races:

Riding contests, by number of candidates (1945)
Candidates	PC	CCF	Lib	LL	Lab	Lab-Pr	Soc-Lab	I-Lib	I-PC	Ind	SC	Soldier	Total
2	4	3	1										8
3	47	47	43	3	1								141
4	30	30	27	3	3	23	1			3			120
5	7	7	7			7	2		1	1	2	1	35
6	1	1	1			1	1			1			6
7	1	1	1					2			1	1	7
Total	90	89	80	6	4	31	4	2	1	5	3	2	317

== Outcome ==
The Ontario Progressive Conservative Party, led by George Drew, won a second consecutive term in office, winning a solid majority of seats in the legislature—66, up from 38 in the previous election.

The Ontario Liberal Party, led by former premier Mitchell Hepburn, was returned to the role of official opposition with 11 seats, plus 3 Liberal-Labour seats that it won, out of 6 contested, in coalition with the Labor-Progressive Party (which was, in fact, the Communist Party), in an effort to marginalize the CCF. The three new Liberal-Labour MPPs were James Newman of Rainy River, Joseph Meinzinger of Waterloo North and Alexander Parent of Essex North.

The social democratic Co-operative Commonwealth Federation (CCF), led by Ted Jolliffe, was reduced from 34 seats to 8.

Two seats were won by the Labor-Progressive Party on its own with the re-election of A.A. MacLeod and J.B. Salsberg. The LPP contested a total of 31 ridings under the leadership of Leslie Morris who was defeated in the Toronto riding of Bracondale.

== Results ==
Elections to the 22nd Parliament of Ontario (1945)
Political party	Party leader	MPPs					Votes		
Political party	Party leader	Candidates	1943	Dissol.	1945	±	#	%	± (pp)
Progressive Conservative	George Drew	90	38	38	66	28▲	781,345	44.25	8.50▲
Liberal	Mitchell Hepburn	80	15	15	11	1▼	479,253	27.14	2.50▼
Liberal–Labour		6	–	–	3	1▼	34,879	1.98	2.50▼
Co-operative Commonwealth	Ted Jolliffe	89	34	34	8	26▼	395,708	22.41	9.21▼
Labor–Progressive (Note: A. A. MacLeod (Bellwoods) and J. B. Salsberg (St. Andrew) were the only candidates nominated and elected under the Labour ticket in 1943, but switched to the new Labor-Progressive Party on its formation shortly after the election.)	Leslie Morris	31	2	2	2	Steady	46,418	2.63	1.73▲
Independent Liberal (Note: Mitchell Hepburn (Elgin) opted not to run as a Liberal candidate in 1943, and returned to the Liberals to once again become their leader.)		2	1	1	–	1▼	6,359	0.36	0.41▼
Labour (Note: compared with Independent Labour 1943 results)		4	–	–	–	–	10,805	0.61	0.44▲
Independent		5	–	–	–	–	6,995	0.40	0.21▲
Soldier (Note: George Barker (York East) was an Independent-Soldier candidate, and John Beauchamp (Ottawa East) ran under the Veterans' Reform ticket.)		2	–	–	–	–	1,875	0.11	0.07▲
Socialist Labor		4	–	–	–	–	976	0.06	–
Social Credit		3	–	–	–	–	852	0.05	Returned
Independent PC		1	–	–	–	–	328	0.02	0.02▲
Total		317	90	90	90		1,765,793	100.00%	
Blank and invalid ballots							17,597		
Registered voters / turnout							2,469,960	72.20%	13.84▲

=== Vote and seat summaries ===
Ternary plots - shift of electoral support (1943-1945)
1943

1945
Electoral districts identified by colours of winning parties

Seats and popular vote by party
Party	Seats	Votes	Change (pp)
█ Progressive Conservative	66 / 90	44.25%	8.50
█ Liberal/Liberal-Labour	14 / 90	29.12%	-2.50
█ Co-operative Commonwealth	8 / 90	22.41%	-9.21
█ Labor–Progressive	2 / 90	2.63%	1.73
█ Other	0 / 90	1.59%	1.48

=== Synopsis of results ===
Results by riding - 1945 Ontario general election
Riding	Winning party						Turnout (Note: including spoilt ballots)	Votes									
Name (Note: order is as given in EO reports)	1943	Party	Votes	Share	Margin #	Margin %	Turnout	PC	Lib	LL	CCF	Lab-Pr	Lab	I-Lib	I-Oth	Other	Total
Addington	PC	PC	6,992	54.15%	2,113	16.36%	80.65%	6,992	4,879	–	1,042	–	–	–	–	–	12,913
Algoma—Manitoulin	Lib	PC	4,336	37.42%	168	1.45%	77.98%	4,336	4,168	–	3,083	–	–	–	–	–	11,587
Brant	Lib	Lib	7,151	47.68%	1,191	7.94%	70.12%	5,960	7,151	–	1,886	–	–	–	–	–	14,997
Brantford	CCF	PC	6,581	36.91%	26	0.15%	74.69%	6,581	6,555	–	4,266	426	–	–	–	–	17,828
Bruce	Lib	PC	7,229	46.16%	449	2.87%	76.77%	7,229	6,780	–	1,651	–	–	–	–	–	15,660
Carleton	PC	PC	9,495	59.80%	5,253	33.08%	72.09%	9,495	4,242	–	2,141	–	–	–	–	–	15,878
Cochrane North	CCF	Lib	3,573	39.07%	313	3.42%	80.91%	1,918	3,573	–	3,260	395	–	–	–	–	9,146
Cochrane South	CCF	CCF	10,521	40.29%	2,822	10.81%	79.48%	6,126	7,699	–	10,521	1,764	–	–	–	–	26,110
Dufferin—Simcoe	PC	PC	9,216	74.30%	6,028	48.60%	62.38%	9,216	–	–	3,188	–	–	–	–	–	12,404
Durham	PC	PC	7,027	53.36%	2,585	19.63%	77.00%	7,027	4,442	–	1,700	–	–	–	–	–	13,169
Elgin	Ind-Lib	PC	10,278	52.29%	2,402	12.22%	76.50%	10,278	7,876	–	1,500	–	–	–	–	–	19,654
Essex North	CCF	LL	6,801	36.41%	685	3.67%	69.28%	6,116	–	6,801	5,762	–	–	–	–	–	18,679
Essex South	PC	PC	7,688	51.99%	1,825	12.34%	74.42%	7,688	5,863	–	1,237	–	–	–	–	–	14,788
Fort William	CCF	CCF	8,197	41.88%	2,590	13.23%	74.29%	5,607	4,598	–	8,197	1,171	–	–	–	–	19,573
Glengarry	Lib	Lib	5,594	54.90%	1,613	15.83%	74.30%	3,981	5,594	–	615	–	–	–	–	–	10,190
Grenville—Dundas	PC	PC	8,843	62.17%	4,593	32.29%	65.50%	8,843	4,250	–	1,130	–	–	–	–	–	14,223
Grey North	Lib	PC	7,275	45.63%	592	3.71%	74.17%	7,275	6,683	–	1,987	–	–	–	–	–	15,945
Grey South	Lib	Lib	6,584	52.66%	1,541	12.33%	72.17%	5,043	6,584	–	876	–	–	–	–	–	12,503
Haldimand—Norfolk	PC	PC	11,943	53.64%	4,622	20.76%	71.55%	11,943	7,321	–	3,003	–	–	–	–	–	22,267
Halton	PC	PC	6,914	44.77%	1,189	7.70%	74.31%	6,914	5,725	–	2,806	–	–	–	–	–	15,445
Hamilton East	CCF	PC	10,561	41.70%	2,739	10.81%	73.12%	10,561	4,445	–	7,822	2,291	–	–	–	207	25,326
Hamilton Centre	CCF	PC	9,091	36.23%	640	2.55%	74.18%	9,091	5,633	–	8,451	1,919	–	–	–	–	25,094
Hamilton—Wentworth	CCF	PC	10,102	44.00%	3,850	16.77%	78.49%	10,102	6,252	–	6,047	556	–	–	–	–	22,957
Hastings East*	PC	PC	5,928	56.90%	2,489	23.89%	72.02%	5,928	3,439	–	1,052	–	–	–	–	–	10,419
Hastings West	PC	PC	9,351	50.83%	2,910	15.82%	69.35%	9,351	6,441	–	2,604	–	–	–	–	–	18,396
Huron	PC	PC	7,081	52.67%	1,929	14.35%	74.90%	7,081	5,152	–	1,211	–	–	–	–	–	13,444
Huron—Bruce	PC	PC	7,188	52.57%	2,169	15.86%	76.53%	7,188	5,019	–	1,465	–	–	–	–	–	13,672
Kenora	CCF	CCF	3,461	33.92%	190	1.86%	73.80%	3,271	–	2,998	3,461	474	–	–	–	–	10,204
Kent East	PC	PC	7,000	53.20%	841	6.39%	78.53%	7,000	6,159	–	–	–	–	–	–	–	13,159
Kent West	Lib	PC	10,691	51.68%	2,555	12.35%	71.20%	10,691	8,136	–	1,861	–	–	–	–	–	20,688
Kingston*	PC	PC	9,275	52.71%	2,907	16.52%	73.63%	9,275	6,368	–	1,631	322	–	–	–	–	17,596
Lambton East	Lib	PC	5,693	45.96%	86	0.69%	71.90%	5,693	5,607	–	1,087	–	–	–	–	–	12,387
Lambton West	CCF	PC	7,255	42.61%	975	5.73%	77.16%	7,255	6,280	–	3,490	–	–	–	–	–	17,025
Lanark	PC	PC	12,483	87.26%	10,660	74.51%	63.59%	12,483	–	–	1,823	–	–	–	–	–	14,306
Leeds	PC	PC	10,192	58.05%	4,229	24.09%	75.89%	10,192	5,963	–	1,403	–	–	–	–	–	17,558
Lincoln	PC	PC	16,344	49.91%	8,293	25.32%	76.03%	16,344	8,051	–	6,791	–	1,563	–	–	–	32,749
London	PC	PC	16,649	46.03%	5,390	14.90%	77.55%	16,649	11,259	–	7,863	402	–	–	–	–	36,173
Middlesex North	PC	PC	7,123	45.85%	1,764	11.35%	71.76%	7,123	5,359	–	3,055	–	–	–	–	–	15,537
Middlesex South	PC	PC	6,251	44.57%	135	0.96%	71.08%	6,251	6,116	–	1,659	–	–	–	–	–	14,026
Muskoka—Ontario	Lib	PC	8,073	47.71%	1,902	11.24%	73.95%	8,073	6,171	–	2,676	–	–	–	–	–	16,920
Niagara Falls	CCF	PC	7,014	33.39%	192	0.91%	70.22%	7,014	6,822	–	6,560	611	–	–	–	–	21,007
Nipissing	CCF	Lib	5,988	35.45%	1,123	6.65%	74.59%	4,512	5,988	–	4,865	–	–	–	1,525	–	16,890
Northumberland	PC	PC	8,674	55.70%	2,911	18.69%	76.85%	8,674	5,763	–	1,135	–	–	–	–	–	15,572
Ontario	CCF	PC	9,130	35.49%	1,079	4.19%	74.38%	9,130	8,051	–	7,693	–	852	–	–	–	25,726
Ottawa East	Lib	Lib	10,725	42.36%	4,708	18.60%	66.34%	5,287	10,725	–	2,234	–	–	6,359	–	711	25,316
Ottawa South	PC	PC	23,616	53.50%	9,167	20.77%	69.93%	23,616	14,449	–	5,571	–	–	–	–	503	44,139
Oxford	PC	PC	11,402	50.05%	3,408	14.96%	72.53%	11,402	7,994	–	3,386	–	–	–	–	–	22,782
Parry Sound	CCF	Lib	4,289	36.81%	124	1.06%	73.35%	4,165	4,289	–	3,199	–	–	–	–	–	11,653
Peel	PC	PC	9,923	56.19%	5,511	31.21%	69.10%	9,923	–	4,412	3,325	–	–	–	–	–	17,660
Perth	Lib	PC	12,302	48.24%	1,935	7.59%	72.34%	12,302	10,367	–	2,835	–	–	–	–	–	25,504
Peterborough	PC	PC	12,398	50.94%	4,684	19.25%	81.29%	12,398	7,714	–	4,225	–	–	–	–	–	24,337
Port Arthur	CCF	CCF	6,403	34.90%	2,028	11.05%	73.01%	3,254	4,375	–	6,403	1,486	–	–	2,828	–	18,346
Prescott	Lib	Lib	6,037	51.31%	2,255	19.17%	75.06%	1,946	6,037	–	3,782	–	–	–	–	–	11,765
Prince Edward—Lennox	PC	PC	7,583	57.46%	2,878	21.81%	71.84%	7,583	4,705	–	909	–	–	–	–	–	13,197
Rainy River	CCF	LL	2,583	34.59%	251	3.36%	78.63%	2,332	–	2,583	2,186	366	–	–	–	–	7,467
Renfrew North	PC	PC	6,118	45.97%	1,570	11.80%	80.89%	6,118	4,548	–	2,643	–	–	–	–	–	13,309
Renfrew South	Lib	PC	5,864	48.39%	774	6.39%	75.09%	5,864	5,090	–	1,164	–	–	–	–	–	12,118
Russell	Lib	Lib	5,925	49.94%	1,511	12.74%	65.82%	4,414	5,925	–	997	–	–	–	528	–	11,864
Sault Ste. Marie	CCF	CCF	5,623	34.69%	176	1.09%	81.51%	5,447	5,138	–	5,623	–	–	–	–	–	16,208
Simcoe Centre	PC	PC	6,229	45.22%	1,613	11.71%	77.39%	6,229	4,616	–	1,754	–	–	–	1,176	–	13,775
Simcoe East	PC	PC	7,433	50.05%	3,265	21.99%	60.10%	7,433	4,168	–	3,249	–	–	–	–	–	14,850
Stormont	PC	Lib	8,701	49.43%	2,057	11.69%	59.26%	6,644	8,701	–	1,664	594	–	–	–	–	17,603
Sudbury	CCF	CCF	13,627	47.33%	6,075	21.10%	74.80%	5,920	7,552	–	13,627	1,692	–	–	–	–	28,791
Temiskaming	CCF	CCF	4,327	39.66%	1,176	10.78%	78.17%	3,151	3,150	–	4,327	282	–	–	–	–	10,910
Victoria	PC	PC	9,732	61.39%	5,098	32.16%	75.66%	9,732	4,634	–	1,487	–	–	–	–	–	15,853
Waterloo North	CCF	LL	11,104	41.24%	1,165	4.33%	69.96%	9,939	–	11,104	5,135	745	–	–	–	–	26,923
Waterloo South	CCF	PC	8,289	42.32%	2,035	10.39%	72.64%	8,289	5,043	–	6,254	–	–	–	–	–	19,586
Welland	CCF	PC	8,161	34.55%	244	1.03%	78.35%	8,161	7,917	–	5,440	–	2,106	–	–	–	23,624
Wellington North	Lib	Lib	6,821	46.89%	24	0.16%	72.58%	6,797	6,821	–	928	–	–	–	–	–	14,546
Wellington South	CCF	PC	7,608	43.40%	1,598	9.12%	74.29%	7,608	6,010	–	3,910	–	–	–	–	–	17,528
Wentworth	CCF	CCF	9,612	39.08%	591	2.40%	70.03%	9,021	4,254	–	9,612	1,325	–	–	–	385	24,597
Windsor—Walkerville	CCF	PC	7,880	40.27%	1,596	8.16%	69.21%	7,880	–	–	5,402	–	6,284	–	–	–	19,566
Windsor—Sandwich	CCF	PC	8,487	40.59%	1,506	7.20%	67.54%	8,487	–	6,981	5,439	–	–	–	–	–	20,907
York East	CCF	PC	20,741	46.95%	5,628	12.74%	68.66%	20,741	6,163	–	15,113	753	–	–	–	1,411	44,181
York North	CCF	PC	10,348	42.16%	3,042	12.39%	72.23%	10,348	7,306	–	6,889	–	–	–	–	–	24,543
York South	CCF	PC	14,893	40.53%	768	2.09%	68.39%	14,893	6,486	–	14,125	1,024	–	–	–	220	36,748
York West	CCF	PC	16,408	43.95%	4,422	11.85%	68.84%	16,408	8,016	–	11,986	922	–	–	–	–	37,332
Beaches	PC	PC	11,676	52.38%	4,854	21.77%	70.60%	11,676	3,794	–	6,822	–	–	–	–	–	22,292
Bellwoods	Lab	Lab-Pr	6,799	33.62%	816	4.03%	70.28%	5,983	3,301	–	4,142	6,799	–	–	–	–	20,225
Bracondale	CCF	PC	6,600	35.61%	1,622	8.75%	70.77%	6,600	4,019	–	4,978	2,607	–	–	328	–	18,532
Dovercourt	PC	PC	12,236	45.67%	4,704	17.56%	68.84%	12,236	5,788	–	7,532	1,237	–	–	–	–	26,793
Eglinton	PC	PC	26,115	63.72%	18,830	45.95%	78.93%	26,115	6,450	–	7,285	1,132	–	–	–	–	40,982
High Park	PC	PC	15,238	57.19%	3,830	14.37%	72.87%	15,238	–	–	11,408	–	–	–	–	–	26,646
Parkdale	PC	PC	13,875	46.71%	6,159	20.73%	71.44%	13,875	7,716	–	6,812	1,304	–	–	–	–	29,707
Riverdale	CCF	PC	12,620	47.53%	3,871	14.58%	67.06%	12,620	4,302	–	8,749	683	–	–	–	197	26,551
St. Andrew	Lab	Lab-Pr	10,010	51.80%	5,985	30.97%	68.22%	4,025	2,505	–	2,786	10,010	–	–	–	–	19,326
St. David	CCF	PC	8,535	42.24%	2,973	14.71%	66.38%	8,535	4,924	–	5,562	1,183	–	–	–	–	20,204
St. George	PC	PC	13,153	55.34%	6,982	29.38%	65.87%	13,153	4,442	–	6,171	–	–	–	–	–	23,766
St. Patrick	PC	PC	7,974	50.21%	4,713	29.68%	68.02%	7,974	3,163	–	3,261	1,484	–	–	–	–	15,882
Woodbine	CCF	PC	12,083	43.83%	2,262	8.20%	67.78%	12,083	4,199	–	9,821	459	–	–	938	69	27,569

= open seat
= turnout is above provincial average
= winning candidate was in previous Legislature
= incumbent had switched allegiance
= incumbency arose from byelection gain
= previously incumbent in another riding
= other incumbents renominated
= not incumbent; was previously elected to the Legislature
= previously an MP in the House of Commons of Canada
= multiple candidates

=== Analysis ===
Party candidates in 2nd place
Party in 1st place	Party in 2nd place						Total
Party in 1st place	PC	Lib	LL	CCF	Lab	I-Lib	Total
Progressive Conservative		45	2	18	1		66
Liberal	7			3		1	11
Liberal–Labour	3						3
Co-operative Commonwealth	5	3					8
Labor–Progressive	2						2
Total	17	48	2	21	1	1	90

Candidates ranked 1st to 5th place, by party
Parties	1st	2nd	3rd	4th	5th	Total
█ Progressive Conservative	66	17	7			90
█ Liberal	11	48	19	2		80
█ Co-operative Commonwealth	8	21	59	1		89
█ Liberal–Labour	3	2	1			6
█ Labor–Progressive	2			26	3	31
█ Labour		1		3		4
█ Independent Liberal		1				1
█ Independent				5		5
█ Socialist Labor				1	2	3
█ Soldier				1	1	2
█ Social Credit					2	2
█ Independent PC					1	1

Resulting composition of the 22nd Legislative Assembly of Ontario
Source		Party					
Source		PC	Lib	L-L	CCF	Lab-Pr	Total
Seats retained	Incumbents returned	35	6		8	2	51
Seats retained	Open seats held	2	1				3
Seats changing hands	Incumbents defeated	25	2	2			29
Seats changing hands	Open seats gained	3		1			4
Seats changing hands	Return of members previously elected	1	2				3
Total		66	11	3	8	2	90

=== Seats that changed hands ===
Elections to the 22nd Parliament of Ontario – seats won/lost by party, 1943–1945
Party	1943	Gain from (loss to)												1945
Party	1943	PC		Lib		CCF		L-L		Lbr-P		I-Lib		1945
Progressive Conservative	38			8	(1)	20						1		66
Liberal	15	1	(8)			3								11
Co-operative Commonwealth	34		(20)		(3)				(3)					8
Liberal–Labour	–					3								3
Labor–Progressive	2													2
Independent-Liberal (Note: Mitchell Hepburn (Elgin) campaigned as a Liberal and lost.)	1		(1)											–
Total	90	1	(29)	8	(4)	26	–	–	(3)	–	–	1	–	90

There were 36 seats that changed allegiance in the election.

PC to Liberal

- Stormont

Liberal to PC

- Algoma—Manitoulin
- Bruce
- Grey North
- Kent West
- Lambton East
- Muskoka—Ontario
- Perth
- Renfrew South

CCF to PC

- Bracondale
- Brantford
- Hamilton Centre
- Hamilton East
- Hamilton—Wentworth
- Lambton West
- Niagara Falls
- Ontario
- Riverdale
- St. David
- Waterloo South
- Welland
- Wellington South
- Windsor—Sandwich
- Windsor—Walkerville
- Woodbine
- York East
- York North
- York South
- York West

CCF to Liberal

- Cochrane North
- Nipissing
- Parry Sound

CCF to Liberal-Labour

- Essex North
- Rainy River
- Waterloo North

Independent-Liberal to PC

- Elgin

=== Notable group of candidates ===
Ten candidates who were not incumbents had served as MPPs prior to 1943:

Riding	Candidate		Votes	Placed
Cochrane North	█ Liberal	Joseph-Anaclet Habel	3,573	1st
Hamilton Centre	█ Liberal	John Newlands	5,633	3rd
Hamilton—Wentworth	█ Liberal	Thomas Baker McQuesten	6,252	2nd
Lambton West	█ Liberal	William Guthrie	6,280	2nd
Niagara Falls	█ Liberal	William Houck	6,822	2nd
Parry Sound	█ Liberal	Milton Taylor Armstrong	4,289	1st
Temiskaming	█ Liberal	William Glennie Nixon	3,150	3rd
Welland	█ Liberal	Edward James Anderson	7,917	2nd
Bracondale	█ Liberal	Lionel Pretoria Conacher	4,019	3rd
Woodbine	█ Progressive Conservative	Goldwin Corlett Elgie	12,083	1st

== See also ==
- Politics of Ontario
- List of Ontario political parties
- Premier of Ontario
- Leader of the Opposition (Ontario)
