= Howard Julian Sale =

Canadian politician from Ontario

Member of the Ontario Provincial Parliament for York South
- In office June 4, 1945 – April 27, 1948
- Preceded by: Ted Jolliffe
- Succeeded by: Ted Jolliffe

Personal details
- Party: Progressive Conservative

Howard Julian Sale was a Canadian politician who was Progressive Conservative MPP for York South from 1945 to 1948.

== See also ==
- 22nd Parliament of Ontario
