= Peace Council =

Peace Council may refer to:

- World Peace Council
- Board of Peace
- Peace Council (Ghana) or National Peace Council (Ghana)
- National Peace Council (United Kingdom)
- Peace at Home Council
- KNU/KNLA Peace Council
- Women's Peace Council
- National Council for Peace, Iran
- National Council for Peace and Order, Thailand
- Liberia Peace Council
- U.S. Peace Council
- Afghan Peace Council
- Afghan High Peace Council
- Labor's National Peace Council

== See also ==
- World Peace Congress (disambiguation)
- Peace (disambiguation)
- Peace committee
