= A. A. MacLeod =

Canadian politician (1902–1970)

Member of the Ontario Provincial Parliament for Bellwoods
- In office 1943–1951
- Preceded by: Arthur Roebuck
- Succeeded by: John Yaremko

Personal details
- Born: Alexander Albert MacLeod; April 2, 1902 Black Rock, Victoria County, Nova Scotia, Canada
- Died: March 13, 1970 (aged 67) Toronto, Ontario, Canada
- Party: Labor-Progressive (1943–56)
- Other political affiliations: Socialist Party of America, Communist Party of Canada
- Spouses: Annie Jean Hicks (m. 1923; died 1926); Virginia MacLean (m. 1930)
- Children: 4
- Education: King's Coll., Windsor, Nova Scotia; Halifax Business School
- Occupation: YMCA secretary, 1920s; business manager and executive editor, The World Tomorrow, 1929-34; chairman, Canadian League Against War and Fascism (League for Peace and Democracy), 1934-39; council member, International Peace Campaign, 1936-37; MPP, 1943-51

Alexander Albert MacLeod (April 2, 1902 – March 13, 1970) was a political organizer and a prominent member of the Communist Party of Canada and, later, of its legal group, the Labor-Progressive Party. He was an elected Member of the Provincial Parliament of Ontario from 1943 to 1951.

== Early life ==
MacLeod was born in 1902 in Black Rock, Nova Scotia. After the opening of the steel plant at Sydney Mines, the family relocated and his father was employed there as a steelworker. MacLeod was educated in local public schools and also worked at the steel plant as a young man. He enlisted in the Canadian Army in his early teens; some accounts state that MacLeod was the youngest soldier to enlist in the Canadian Army during World War I. He went overseas with the 185th Battalion of the Cape Breton Highlanders and returned to Canada shortly before the end of the war. After working at the steel plant again and completing further education, MacLeod was employed by YMCA, first in North Sydney and Halifax in Nova Scotia and then as an executive member in Chicago.

== Radicalization ==
In the late 1920s, MacLeod moved to New York City, U.S. to work on the staff of The World Tomorrow, a prominent socialist-pacifist magazine. While in New York, he married Virginia MacLean, who was originally from North Sydney and educated at Acadia University in Wolfville, Nova Scotia. She would be the maternal aunt of actors Shirley MacLaine and Warren Beatty, after they were born in the 1930s.

The MacLeods were both pacifists and both were supporters of the Socialist Party of America. They moved further to the left as a result of the Scottsboro Boys case, joining the Defense League for the Scottsboro Boys in which Communist Party USA activists were heavily involved.

The MacLeods were also radicalized by the poverty of the Great Depression and by their opposition to the growing threat of fascism. In 1933, the couple returned to Nova Scotia, possibly with plans of taking up permanent residence there. MacLeod hoped to establish a workers' school to prepare coal miners and others to work as social activists. While in Nova Scotia, they campaigned in the 1933 provincial election for J. B. McLachlan, the veteran union leader and Communist who was running as a "Workers' United Front" candidate. The MacLeods joined the Communist Party during this period.

== Anti-fascism and Spanish Civil War ==
In 1934, MacLeod focused his attention on organizing the founding conference of the Canadian League Against War and Fascism, which took place in Toronto in October. With more than 500 delegates in attendance from a range of leftist and labour groups, this was a major step in the Communist Party's shift to the popular front strategy. MacLeod presided and served as national chairman for the next five years. In its last years, the organization was known as the Canadian League for Peace and Democracy. MacLeod resigned as chairman in August 1939, on the eve of World War II.

Throughout the 1930s, MacLeod helped attract Andre Malraux, Thomas Mann, Harry F. Ward and others as speakers for events organized by the Fellowship of Reconciliation, the Women's International League for Peace and Freedom, and his Canadian League Against War and Fascism. His vision was to steer the peace movement towards the view of peace as realizable through radical change and socialist solidarity.

In 1936, MacLeod led the Canadian delegation at the World Peace Congress in Brussels and shortly afterwards he became the first North American to witness the Spanish Civil War. He jointly published a pamphlet summarizing the critical situation in the Spanish Republic, where a socialist government had come to power earlier that year and was facing a fascist rebellion. Subsequently, MacLeod helped to organize the Canadian Committee to Aid Spanish Democracy, which raised support for the defence of the Spanish Republic in the Spanish Civil War. He was active in recruiting volunteers for the International Brigade and successfully argued for the creation of a separate Mackenzie–Papineau Battalion in order to recognize the Canadian participation. In 1937 under Norman Bethune's direction MacLeod officially presented the Canadian Blood Transfusion Unit to Republicans.

In Prague during the Munich Agreement of 1938, MacLeod "became instrumental in the emigration of Czech intellectuals".

== World War II ==
As a result of the Hitler-Stalin Pact and the eruption of World War II, the League against War and Fascism was banned in 1940 under the Defence of Canada Regulations along with the Communist Party itself. Earlier in the year, in January 1940, MacLeod had co-founded and become the first editor of the Canadian Tribune. The weekly newspaper served as the unofficial organ of the Communist Party as it struggled to remain politically relevant.

In 1941, with the support of the recently elected Saskatchewan Member of Parliament Dorise Nielsen, MacLeod was candidate in the Edmonton East federal by-election as a "People's Movement" candidate. He received more than 18 per cent of the vote.

Following the Nazi invasion of the Soviet Union in 1941, MacLeod actively promoted the war effort, speaking for the Victory Loan Committee and at major public rallies in support of wartime mobilization.

After the Second World War, MacLeod helped James Gareth Endicott found the Canadian Peace Congress.

== Provincial politics ==
In the August 1943 Ontario provincial election, MacLeod ran as a Labour candidate and was elected as the Member of Provincial Parliament for the working-class Toronto riding of Bellwoods. His colleague, J.B. Salsberg, a popular union organizer, was elected in the neighbouring riding of St. Andrew. The Labor-Progressive Party was officially formed later that month and became the legal face of the Communist Party. MacLeod and Salsberg were among the most prominent public figures in the LPP and were re-elected in both the 1945 general election and the 1948 general election. MacLeod lost his seat in the 1951 election, and Salsberg remained as the sole LPP MPP until his defeat in 1955. Within the provincial legislative assembly, writes Salsberg's biographer Gerald Tulchinsky, the LPP members "exploited their leverage, however limited, to greatest advantage, focusing on labour and human rights issues". He notes that over the years their interventions contributed to the enactment of legislation in this area. Although his political views were often considered unpopular, MacLeod won the respect of his fellow legislators. Referring to MacLeod and Salsberg, Progressive Conservative Premier Leslie Frost once remarked: "Those two had more brains between them than the rest of the opposition put together".

== Later years ==
After having not been re-elected to the legislature, MacLeod ran for Mayor of Toronto in the 1954 Toronto municipal election. He came in fourth, with 4,932 votes, losing to Nathan Phillips. MacLeod left the Labor-Progressive Party along with the majority of its members following Nikita Khrushchev's Secret Speech at the Twentieth Party Congress of the Communist Party of the Soviet Union in 1956 that revealed the crimes of Joseph Stalin.

Despite their ideological differences, MacLeod was a personal favourite of Premier Frost, who gave MacLeod an office on the fourth floor of the legislative building at Queen's Park following his defeat and made him a paid advisor and one of his speechwriters. MacLeod was involved in the establishment of the Ontario Human Rights Commission in 1961 and edited several of its publications.

In another initiative, he proposed the naming of Highway 401, a major new cross-province expressway, as the Macdonald-Cartier Freeway after Sir John A. Macdonald and George-Étienne Cartier. MacLeod acted as an advisor to Premier John Robarts and worked closely with Clare Westcott and then-Education Minister Bill Davis on several projects concerning Canadian history.

He died on March 13, 1970, of injuries from being struck by a car.

== Family ==
MacLeod had two children by Annie Jean Hicks - the first was Jean Macleod and the second was Annabelle MacGregor MacLeod - his wife Annie burned to death when a wood stove blew up only three years later- Annie's poor father Rufus "the Red" Lawson Hicks was there to witness the terrible tragedy and beat out the flames and carried the scars of her death on his arms to his grave.

MacLeod later married Virginia MacLean, the sister of Kathlyn Corinne MacLean whose children are Hollywood movie actors Warren Beatty and Shirley MacLaine. MacLeod thus became their uncle. Both Beatty and MacLaine have referred to the MacLeods as a major influence on their own liberal political philosophy. One of Beatty's biographers has commented that his aunt and uncle were "the private inspiration" behind his portrait of Louise Bryant and John Reed in his 1981 film Reds.

MacLeod's youngest child, David Leigh MacLeod, worked for Beatty for many years as an assistant. He was associate producer of Reds and Ishtar as well as co-producer of The Pick-up Artist. He was found dead in Montreal, Quebec in 1998 after having been a fugitive from the Federal Bureau of Investigation and New York police for nine years after fleeing a New York courtroom while on trial on charges of criminal solicitation involving minors.

One of MacLeod's daughters, Joan MacLeod was a folk singer and married Ray Woodley of the band The Travellers.
