= J. B. Salsberg =

Canadian politician (1902–1998)

J.B. Salsberg

Ontario MPP
- In office 1943–1955
- Preceded by: J.J. Glass
- Succeeded by: Allan Grossman
- Constituency: St. Andrew

Personal details
- Born: Joseph Baruch Salsberg; November 5, 1902 Lugov, Poland
- Died: February 8, 1998 (aged 95) Toronto, Ontario, Canada
- Resting place: Bathurst Lawn Memorial Park
- Party: Labor-Progressive
- Spouse: Dora Wilensky
- Occupation: Labour organizer, insurance agent

Joseph Baruch (J.B.) Salsberg (November 5, 1902 – February 8, 1998) was a politician in Ontario, Canada. He was a Labor-Progressive member of the Legislative Assembly of Ontario from 1943 to 1955 who represented the riding of St. Andrew in downtown Toronto. He was a longtime Communist and activist in the Jewish community.

== Early life ==
Salsberg was born in 1902 to Abraham and Sarah Gitel Salsberg in the small town of Lagow (Lagov, in Yiddish pronunciation), in the Opatow district of Radom in what is now Poland. He emigrated to Canada with his parents in 1913 at age 11, settling in Toronto. His father worked as a peddler to support his wife and seven children. Joseph dropped out of Landsdowne Public School after two years, at the age of 13, in order to work in sweatshops full-time for $3 a week to help support the family but continued to study at night to be a rabbi in the Orthodox tradition. His industrial experience led him to labour activism, particularly in the garment workers union where he fought for improved wages and conditions. At age 16, he informed his traditionalist parents that he was abandoning Talmudic studies in favour of a secular humanist philosophy. He joined a Labour Zionist workers' group, the Young Poale Zion, and quickly rose to leadership going to New York City to serve as general secretary of the North American group from 1922 to 1924, editing its newspaper and going on speaking tours across the continent. He returned to Toronto and became an organizer for the Cloth Hat, Cap and Millinery Workers International Union and, in 1927, married Dora Wilensky who later became a social worker with Jewish Family and Child Services.

== Communist activity ==
By 1926, Salsberg's trade unionism and socialism led him to become an active member of the Communist Party of Canada. He became well known in the Jewish community, many of whose members were workers in the garment district which was concentrated around Spadina Avenue. He became vice-president of the International Hatters' Union and a member of the Communist Party's Central Committee. He was active in a number of unionization drives across Canada.

In 1932, Salsberg became the Southern Ontario district organizer for the Workers Unity League, a communist-led group which sought to replace Canada's traditional craft unions with industrial unions. He attained further prominence in this role; Canadian historian Irving Abella later wrote that Salsberg was known as the "Commissar" of Southern Ontario's trade union movement.

== Politics ==
In 1938, he was elected an alderman on Toronto's city council representing Ward 4 (which included the largely Jewish working class neighbourhoods around Spadina Avenue and Kensington Market). He was known throughout the city for his work on social issues. Heckled by adversaries as a puppet of Joseph Stalin, Salsberg joked that "You're right. I got a telegram from Joe Stalin this morning ordering me to ask for a park for Ward 4."

In the 1943 provincial election he ran as the Labor-Progressive Party candidate in the downtown Toronto riding of St. Andrew. He defeated Liberal incumbent J.J. Glass by 5,150 votes. The Labor-Progressive Party (LPP) as the Communist Party of Ontario was known had been founded as the legal face of the Communist Party which had been banned in 1941. Salsberg was elected alongside fellow LPPer A.A. MacLeod who represented the neighbouring riding of Bellwoods. He was re-elected in 1945, 1948, and 1951.

Salsberg was a popular MPP inside and outside the house and was respected by members of all parties. He was instrumental in the introduction of the Racial Discrimination Act, 1944 which he proposed as a result of posted notices banning Jews and Blacks from various swimming pools in Toronto and as a result of other cases of anti-Semitism and racism in the province. The law was one of the foundations that led to the eventual passage of the Ontario Human Rights Code.

Most of his speeches were non-ideological, and he almost never made reference to the Soviet Union during his time in the legislature. Leslie Frost, the province's Progressive Conservative Premier from 1949 to 1961, respected Salsberg's abilities as a parliamentarian; it has even been reported that Frost was willing to offer Salsberg a cabinet position if he defected to the Progressive Conservative Party. Frost named Salsberg Township near what is now Thunder Bay in his honour.

Salsberg was the sole communist in the Legislature after the 1951 election in which MacLeod lost his seat. Salsberg eulogized Stalin on the house floor when the Soviet leader died in 1953 and this speech was used against him in the 1955 election campaign when he was defeated by Progressive Conservative Allan Grossman.

== Break with Communism ==
Salsberg had for several years been concerned with official antisemitism in the Soviet Union, and had confronted Canadian Communist leader Tim Buck on the subject as early as 1939. He remained silent on the matter for several years (in part to maintain party unity during World War II), but became increasingly troubled by ongoing anti-Semitism in the 1950s. He travelled to the USSR in 1955 and 1956, and witnessed first-hand the extent of the anti-Semitic campaign that had persecuted Jews in that country.

Salsberg attempted to personally confront Nikita Khrushchev on the matter during his second visit, but his concerns were dismissed. Also disillusioned by Soviet invasion of Hungary and Khrushchev's Secret Speech, he resigned from the Communist Party upon his return to Canada (leading an exodus which included half the national executive). Salsberg reported back to the Labor-Progressive Party and an allied organization, the United Jewish Peoples' Order on his findings. He was suspended for a time from the leadership of the LPP as a result and, after an internal debate, left the LPP along with most of its Jewish cadre. The UJPO supported Salsberg's findings and severed its ties with the party. Nevertheless, Salsberg and a number of his supporters continued to argue for UJPO to distance itself further from the Soviet Union until he and approximately 200 UJPO members, approximately one-third of the organization, resigned in 1959 and founded the New Fraternal Jewish Association in 1960 in which Salsberg was a leading member until his death.

== Later life ==
The late 1950s were a period of tragedy for Salsberg: in addition to losing his belief in communism (and his seat in the legislature), his wife Dora died in 1959. He withdrew from political activity for a time, and sold insurance to make a living. There are reports that he was eventually able to make a small fortune through this practice.

Salsberg later rejoined the Canadian Jewish Congress (which had previously expelled its Communist members). In 1959 he and about one-third of the membership of UJPO left, feeling that the organization was not critical enough of the Soviet Union, and started a new organization called the New Fraternal Jewish Association. The NFJA was made up primarily of former Jewish Communists still interested in promoting social justice. Salsberg was also involved in a variety of cultural activities, including Yiddish-language programs.

Salsberg also returned to Labour Zionism and, in his old age, was a longtime columnist for the Canadian Jewish News until shortly before his death.

== Election results ==
=== Municipal - Ward 4 (Two aldermen elected) ===
January 1936

Ward 4 (Kensington Market and Garment District)
Robert Hood Saunders (incumbent) - 4,941
Nathan Phillips (incumbent) - 4,811
H.M. Goodman - 2,466
J.B. Salsberg - 2,343
Max Federman - 816
S.C. Schiller - 225

December 1936

Ward 4 (Kensington Market and Garment District)
Nathan Phillips (incumbent) - 4,127
Robert Hood Saunders (incumbent) - 3,884
J.B. Salsberg - 3,633
Herbert Orliffe - 813
Albert Leslie - 673

1937

Ward 4 (Kensington Market and Garment District)
Nathan Phillips (incumbent) - 5,002
J.B. Salsberg - 4,725
David A. Balfour - 3,172
Hyman Langer - 1,967
Joseph Stewart - 1,211

1939

Ward 4 (The Annex, Kensington Market and Garment District)
Nathan Phillips (incumbent) - 7,230
David A. Balfour - 6,339
J.B. Salsberg (incumbent) - 5,830
Joseph Stewart - 1,216

1940

Ward 4 (The Annex, Kensington Market and Garment District)
Nathan Phillips (incumbent) - 5,427
Robert Hood Saunders - 4,900
Claude Pearce - 2,761
J.B. Salsberg - 2,154
Louis Zuker - 1,362
Lloyd Muritt - 381

1943

Ward 4 (The Annex, Kensington Market and Garment District)
J. B. Salsberg - 4,783
Nathan Phillips (incumbent) - 2,472
David Balfour (incumbent) - 2,432
Herbert Orliffe - 2,093
William Condle - 290

=== Provincial election results ===
1937 Ontario general election: St. Andrew
Party	Candidate	Votes	Vote %
Liberal	J.J. Glass	6,481	38.6
Labour	Joseph B. Salsberg	6,302	37.6
Conservative	Nathan Phillips	3,097	18.5
Co-operative Commonwealth	Harry Simon	890	5.3
	Total	16,770	

1943 Ontario general election: St. Andrew
Party	Candidate	Votes	Vote %
Labor–Progressive	Joseph B. Salsberg	7,434	53.6
Conservative	John Grudeff	2,452	17.7
Liberal	J.J. Glass	2,284	16.5
Co-operative Commonwealth	Murray Cotterill	1,689	12.2
	Total	13,859	

1945 Ontario general election: St. Andrew
Party	Candidate	Votes 179 out of 200 polls.	Vote %
Labor–Progressive	Joseph B. Salsberg	9,580	53.2
Conservative	E.A Goodman	3,870	21.5
Co-operative Commonwealth	Percy Easser	2,373	13.2
Liberal	Thomas Harcourt	2,186	12.1
	Total	18,009	

1948 Ontario general election: St. Andrew
Party	Candidate	Votes	Vote %
Labor–Progressive	J. B. Salsberg	9,851	49.6
Conservative	Nathan Phillips	4,903	24.7
Co-operative Commonwealth	J. Friedman	3,340	16.8
Liberal	Frank R. Mills	1,770	8.9
	Total	19,864	

1951 Ontario general election: St. Andrew
Party	Candidate	Votes	Vote %
Labor–Progressive	J. B. Salsberg	5,164	39.6
Conservative	Louis Herman	3,854	29.5
Liberal	Alfred Green	2,183	16.7
Co-operative Commonwealth	Sam Resnick	1,854	14.2
	Total	13,055	

1955 Ontario general election: St. Andrew
Party	Candidate	Votes	Vote %
Conservative	Allan Grossman	5,060	41.2
Labor–Progressive	J. B. Salsberg	4,380	35.7
Co-operative Commonwealth	Boris Mather	1,446	11.8
Liberal	L.S. Lockhart	1,231	10.0
Independent	Elizabeth Langfield	150	1.2
	Total	12,267	

=== Federal ===
1935 Canadian federal election: Spadina
Party	Candidate	Votes
Liberal	Samuel Factor	14,768
Conservative	Nathan Phillips	10,047
Communist	Joseph Salsberg	3,646
Reconstruction	D.A. Balfour	3,432
Co-operative Commonwealth	Jacob Romer	1,866

Spadina By-election, after David Croll was appointed to the Senate, 24 October 1955
Party	Candidate	Votes
Progressive Conservative	Charles E. Rea	6,740
Liberal	Samuel Godfrey	6,096
Labor–Progressive	Joseph Salsberg	3,894
Co-operative Commonwealth	Harry Waisglass	2,873
