= St. Andrew (provincial electoral district) =

Former provincial electoral district in Ontario, Canada

Ontario electoral district
- St. Andrew, in relation to the other Toronto ridings, after the 1926 redistribution.

Defunct provincial electoral district
- Legislature: Legislative Assembly of Ontario
- District created: 1925
- District abolished: 1967
- First contested: 1926
- Last contested: 1963

St. Andrew was a provincial electoral district in Ontario, Canada, that was established to elect Members of the Legislative Assembly (MLAs) and then Members of Provincial Parliament (MPPs) to the Legislative Assembly of Ontario.

It was located in downtown Toronto, and was made up of the area to the east of Bathurst Street and west of Yonge Street, including Spadina Avenue and Kensington Market. The population of St. Andrew was largely immigrant, working class and Jewish. For many years it was one of the few electoral districts in North America to elect a Communist. J.B. Salsberg of the Labor-Progressive Party represented the riding from the 1943 election until his defeat in the 1955 election.

The riding was created in 1926, and existed until the 1967, when redistribution resulted in St. Andrew being merged with a neighbouring riding to form St. Andrew—St. Patrick.

St. Andrew riding took its name from the former "St. Andrew's ward" of the city of Toronto.

== Members of Provincial Parliament ==
St. Andrew
Assembly	Years	Member	Party
Created from parts of Toronto Southwest and Toronto Northwest in 1926
17th	1926–1929	William Robertson Flett	Conservative
18th	1929–1934	Ephraim Frederick Singer	Conservative
19th	1934–1937	J.J. Glass (Note: In 1938, the title of Member of the Legislative Assembly was officially changed to Member of Provincial Parliament. Previously, it was unofficially used in the media and in the Legislature.)	Liberal
20th	1937–1943	J.J. Glass	Liberal
21st	1943–1945	J.B. Salsberg	Labor–Progressive
22nd	1945–1948	J.B. Salsberg	Labor–Progressive
23rd	1948–1951	J.B. Salsberg	Labor–Progressive
24th	1951–1955	J.B. Salsberg	Labor–Progressive
25th	1955–1959	Allan Grossman	Progressive Conservative
26th	1959–1963	Allan Grossman	Progressive Conservative
27th	1963–1967	Allan Grossman	Progressive Conservative
Sourced from the Ontario Legislative Assembly
Merged into St. Andrew—St. Patrick after 1967

== Election results ==
1963 Ontario general election
Party	Candidate	Votes	%	±%
Progressive Conservative	Allan Grossman	4,310	43.86	+1.70
Liberal	Donald J. Catalano	3,477	35.39	+1.92
New Democratic	Ellen C. Adams	1,640	16.69	–1.74
Independent	Sam Sherman	194	1.97	–
Independent	Dorothy Cureatz	103	1.05	–0.42
Social Credit	John Ross Taylor	102	1.04	–0.43
Total valid votes		9,826	97.01	
Total rejected ballots		303	2.99	+0.57
Turnout		10,129	58.04	+4.41
Eligible voters		17,453		
Progressive Conservative hold		Swing		–0.11
Source: Elections Ontario

1959 Ontario general election
Party	Candidate	Votes	%	±%
Progressive Conservative	Allan Grossman	3,787	42.16	+0.67
Liberal	Samuel Kelner	3,006	33.47	+23.31
Co-operative Commonwealth	James O. Robertson	1,655	18.43	+6.69
Labor–Progressive	Bruce Magnuson	402	4.48	–30.88
Social Credit	Dorothy Cureatz	132	1.47	–
Total valid votes		8,982	97.58	
Total rejected ballots		223	2.42	+0.24
Turnout		9,205	53.63	–7.30
Eligible voters		17,164		
Progressive Conservative hold		Swing		–11.32
Source: Elections Ontario

1955 Ontario general election
Party	Candidate	Votes	%	±%
Progressive Conservative	Allan Grossman	5,019	41.50	+12.81
Labor–Progressive	J. B. Salsberg	4,276	35.35	–3.49
Co-operative Commonwealth	Boris Mather	1,420	11.74	–2.51
Liberal	Louis S. Lockhart	1,228	10.15	–5.07
Independent	Elizabeth Langfield	152	1.26	–
Total valid votes		12,095	97.82	
Total rejected ballots		270	2.18	–2.44
Turnout		12,365	60.93	+4.36
Eligible voters		20,294		
Progressive Conservative gain from Labor–Progressive		Swing		+8.15
Source: Elections Ontario

1951 Ontario general election
Party	Candidate	Votes	%	±%
Labor–Progressive	J. B. Salsberg	5,220	38.85	–10.56
Progressive Conservative	Louis Herman	3,855	28.69	+3.89
Liberal	Alfred Green	2,046	15.23	+6.45
Co-operative Commonwealth	Samuel Resnick	1,915	14.25	–2.77
Independent	Charles H. Mahoney	401	2.98	–
Total valid votes		13,437	95.38	
Total rejected ballots		651	4.62	+2.62
Turnout		14,088	56.57	–14.65
Eligible voters		24,902		
Labor–Progressive hold		Swing		–7.22
Source: Elections Ontario

1948 Ontario general election
Party	Candidate	Votes	%	±%
Labor–Progressive	J. B. Salsberg	9,890	49.40	–2.39
Progressive Conservative	Nathan Phillips	4,964	24.80	+3.97
Co-operative Commonwealth	Jack Friedman	3,408	17.02	+2.61
Liberal	Francis R. Mills	1,757	8.78	–4.19
Total valid votes		20,019	98.00	
Total rejected ballots		408	2.00	–0.52
Turnout		20,427	71.22	+3.50
Eligible voters		28,682		
Labor–Progressive hold		Swing		–3.18
Source: Elections Ontario

1945 Ontario general election
Party	Candidate	Votes	%	±%
Labor–Progressive	J. B. Salsberg	10,010	51.80	–1.33
Progressive Conservative	Edwin A. Goodman	4,025	20.83	+3.26
Co-operative Commonwealth	Percy Easser	2,786	14.42	+1.72
Liberal	Thomas F. Harcourt	2,505	12.96	–3.64
Total valid votes		19,326	97.48	
Total rejected ballots		499	2.52	–0.48
Turnout		19,825	67.72	+11.63
Eligible voters		29,277		
Labor–Progressive hold		Swing		–2.30
Source: Elections Ontario

1943 Ontario general election
Party	Candidate	Votes	%	±%
Labor–Progressive	J. B. Salsberg	7,576	53.13	+17.19
Progressive Conservative	John Grudeff	2,505	17.57	–4.67
Liberal	John Judah Glass	2,368	16.61	–20.20
Co-operative Commonwealth	Murray Cotterill	1,811	12.70	+7.68
Total valid votes		14,260	97.01	
Total rejected ballots		440	2.99	+0.92
Turnout		14,700	56.09	–15.22
Eligible voters		26,209		
Labor–Progressive gain from Liberal		Swing		+18.70
Source: Elections Ontario

1937 Ontario general election
Party	Candidate	Votes	%	±%
Liberal	John Judah Glass	6,434	36.80	–5.40
Labor–Progressive	J. B. Salsberg	6,283	35.94	–
Conservative	Nathan Phillips	3,888	22.24	–10.40
Co-operative Commonwealth	Harry Simon	878	5.02	–
Total valid votes		17,483	97.93	
Total rejected ballots		370	2.07	–0.00
Turnout		17,853	71.31	+4.74
Eligible voters		25,037		
Liberal hold		Swing		–2.70
Source: Elections Ontario

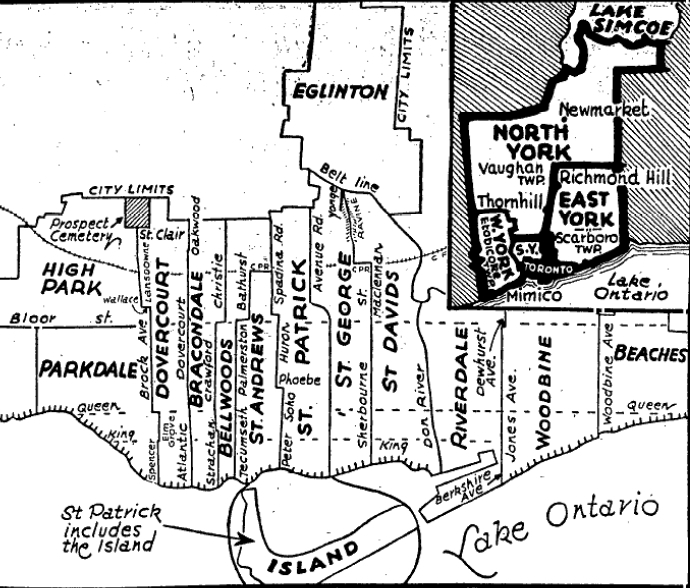
Toronto riding boundaries after 1934 redistribution

1934 Ontario general election
Party	Candidate	Votes	%	±%
Liberal	John Judah Glass	6,055	42.20	+5.84
Conservative	Ephraim Frederick Singer	4,684	32.64	–31.00
Communist	Meyer Klig	2,030	14.15	–
Independent Liberal	Claude Bereford Pearce	1,392	9.70	–
Independent Conservative	John Nelson Day	188	1.31	–
Total valid votes		14,349	97.93	
Total rejected ballots		304	2.07	–0.03
Turnout		14,653	66.57	+28.86
Eligible voters		22,013		
Liberal gain from Conservative		Swing		+18.42
Source: Elections Ontario

=== 1926 electoral boundaries ===
1929 Ontario general election
Party	Candidate	Votes	%	±%
Conservative	Ephraim Frederick Singer	3,436	63.64	+19.64
Liberal	John Judah Glass	1,963	36.36	+33.34
Total valid votes		5,399	97.90	
Total rejected ballots		116	2.10	+0.28
Turnout		5,515	37.71	–29.67
Eligible voters		14,626		
Conservative hold		Swing		–6.85
Source: Elections Ontario

1926 Ontario general election
Party	Candidate	Votes	%
Conservative	William Robertson Flett	4,536	44.00
Independent Conservative	Louis Singer	3,365	32.64
Prohibitionist	Oliver Hezzlewood	2,097	20.34
Liberal	Adam Gordon McIntyre	311	3.02
Total valid votes		10,309	98.18
Total rejected ballots		191	1.82
Turnout		10,500	67.37
Eligible voters		15,585	
Conservative pickup new district.			
Source: Elections Ontario

== See also ==
- List of Ontario provincial electoral districts
- Canadian provincial electoral districts
