= William Robertson Flett =

Canadian politician from Ontario

Member of the Ontario Provincial Parliament for St. Andrew
- In office December 1, 1926 – September 17, 1929
- Preceded by: constituency established
- Succeeded by: Ephraim Frederick Singer

Personal details
- Party: Conservative

William Robertson Flett was a Canadian politician from the Conservative Party of Ontario. He represented St. Andrew in the Legislative Assembly of Ontario from 1926 to 1929.

== See also ==
- 17th Parliament of Ontario
