= World Peace Congress (disambiguation) =

The World Peace Congress is a non-governmental organization dedicated to constructing an institutional basis for world peace, unmediated by state, government or politics.

World Peace Congress may also refer to:

- A series of 33 congresses formally known as the Universal Peace Congress, held not quite annually from 1889 to 1939
- A series of 2 congresses organized by the International Peace Campaign, held in 1936 and 1938
- A series of 27 congresses organized by the World Peace Council from 1948 to 2016

== See also ==
- Peace Council
