= Edwin A. Goodman =

Canadian lawyer

Edwin A. Goodman, PC OC QC (1918 – August 23, 2006) was a Canadian lawyer and political figure.

Goodman graduated from Toronto's Osgoode Hall Law School in 1947 and was one of the founding partners of Goodmans LLP, a Toronto law firm as well as a life bencher of the Law Society of Upper Canada. He is best known, however, for his political work as an advisor and fundraiser for both the Progressive Conservative Party of Canada and particularly the Progressive Conservative Party of Ontario, having been a friend and advisor to both Premier John Robarts and Premier Bill Davis. He has served as the national chair of the Progressive Conservative Party of Canada and as vice-president of both the Ontario and federal Progressive Conservative Party.

Goodman was also active in charity work as honorary president of Scouts Canada and as a director for various bodies such as the Baycrest Centre for Geriatric Care and Princess Margaret Hospital. He was also chairman of the Royal Ontario Museum for six years.

He was considered a Red Tory and was part of the circle known as the Big Blue Machine that helped keep the Ontario Tories in power under Robarts and Davis.

He once ran for public office losing to Communist J.B. Salsberg of the Labor-Progressive Party after World War II.

In April 1975 his daughter Joanne Goodman was killed in a highway accident. He named a lecture series at the University of Western Ontario which every year invites a history to give a series of lectures to the University community

In 1992, Goodman was named to the Security Intelligence Review Committee and was appointed to the Queen's Privy Council for Canada.

His autobiography, The Life of the Party, was published in 1988. He is also an Officer of the Order of Canada.

Goodman died following a heart attack.
