= Communist Party of Canada (Ontario) candidates in the 2003 Ontario provincial election =

The Communist Party of Canada (Ontario) fielded six candidates in the 2003 Ontario general election.

== Candidates ==
Riding	Candidate's Name	Occupation	Votes	%	Rank	Notes
Bramalea—Gore—Malton—Springdale	Howard Cukoff	Writer, translator, and office worker.	503	1.19	6th	
Hamilton East	Bob Mann	Retired steelworker.	380	1.24	5th	
Ottawa Centre	Stuart Ryan	University worker and president of a Canadian Auto Workers local.	306	0.62	5th	
Parkdale—High Park	Karin Larsen	Teacher-in-training.	349	0.88	6th	Not to be confused with the Canadian Broadcasting Corporation journalist of the same name.
Scarborough Centre	Elizabeth Rowley	Party leader and former school trustee.	241	0.58	7th	Became leader of the Communist Party of Canada in 2016.
York West	Christopher Black	Criminal lawyer	408	1.76	5th	Has represented accused war criminals from Rwanda and the former Yugoslavia. Joined the Communist Party due to his opposition to the 1999 NATO bombing of Yugoslavia.

Source for election results: Election Results, Elections Ontario, accessed 2 November 2021.
