= Newman Leopold Steiner =

Canadian businessman, politician, and justice of the peace

Personal details
- Born: 10 December 1829 Dachau or Tachau, Bavaria, German Confederation
- Died: January 5, 1903 (aged 73) Toronto, Ontario, Canada
- Resting place: Mount Pleasant Cemetery, Toronto, Ontario
- Spouse: Bertha Sternberger (m. 1876)

Newman Leopold Steiner was a Canadian businessman, politician, and justice of the peace. He was the first Jew to hold municipal office in Toronto.

Steiner was born in Bavaria to Francisca (née Rothshild) and Wolfgang Steiner. He joined the revolution against the Austrian Empire in 1848, leaving for North America shortly thereafter. He lived in New York and Buffalo before settling in Toronto in 1852, establishing there a stone-cutting and marble dealing business. He became a justice of the peace in 1870, and in 1880 was elected alderman of St. John's Ward, a position he held for five terms.
