= Murray Cotterill =

Canadian politician (1913–1995)

Murray Cotterill (June 27, 1913 – February 23, 1995) was a Canadian trade union activist and organizer for the Co-operative Commonwealth Federation (CCF).

In the 1930s, Cotterill was one of the organisers of the Co-operative Commonwealth Youth Movement. In the 1940s he was a CCF municipal candidate in Toronto and, in 1942, ran for the leadership of the Ontario CCF, losing to Ted Jolliffe. He was also an aide to Charles Millard in organizing the Steel Workers Organizing Committee and was active in rooting out Communists in the fledgling Steelworkers union and was the union's public relations director for many years. Cotterill was also president of the Toronto Labour Council of the Canadian Congress of Labour (one of two labour councils in the city) in the late 1940s. He worked as a labour relations specialist for the Canadian Congress of Labour and its successor the Canadian Labour Congress and was for a time in the 1940s and 1950s the director of the CCL's national Political Action Committee, a position he used to encourage closer ties between the labour movement and the CCF. Cotterill was also the leading force in the OFL's Political Action Committee which helped create an informal alliance between the CCF and the labour movement that later led to the formation of the New Democratic Party as a formal CLC-CCF project.

In the 1963 provincial election he was the NDP's candidate in the suburban Toronto riding of Lakeshore losing to Progressive Conservative Alan Eagleson.

In late 1963, Cotterill was involved with what were described as "secret" negotiations with John Wintermeyer, outgoing leader of the Ontario Liberal Party and various federal Liberals in pursuit of co-operation between the two parties and even their eventual fusion. Cotterill was reportedly offered the vice-presidency of the Ontario Liberal Party but declined. The talks ended due to the opposition of Ontario NDP leader Donald C. MacDonald. Several leading Ontario Liberals also came out against the talks when they learned of them.

From 1940 until his retirement in 1972, Cotterill worked as public relations director of the Canadian Steelworkers and was also an occasional columnist for the Toronto Star. He was a vocal opponent of the Waffle, a left-wing faction within the NDP in the early 1970s and called for the group to be disbanded or expelled from the party.

In retirement, Cotterill moved to Saskatchewan and spent two years working for the Saskatchewan New Democratic Party government of Allan Blakeney.
