= Communist Party of Canada (Ontario) =

Provincial political party in Canada

Communist Party of Canada (Ontario) Parti communiste du Canada (Ontario)
- Leader: Dave McKee
- President: Drew Garvie
- Founded: 1921,1959
- Succeeded by: Labor-Progressive Party (1943–1959)
- Headquarters: 290A Danforth Ave; Toronto, Ontario; M4K 1N6
- Ideology: Communism; Marxism–Leninism
- Political position: Far-left
- National affiliation: Communist Party of Canada
- Colours: Red
- Seats in Legislature: 0
- Most MPPs: 3 (1946—1948)

Website
- communistpartyontario.ca

The Communist Party of Canada (Ontario) (French: Parti communiste du Canada (Ontario)) is the Ontario provincial wing of the Communist Party of Canada. Using the name Labor-Progressive Party from 1943 until 1959, the group won two seats in the Legislative Assembly of Ontario: A.A. MacLeod and J.B. Salsberg were elected in the 1943 provincial election as "Labour" candidates but took their seats as members of the Labor-Progressive Party, which the banned Communist Party launched as its public face in a convention held on August 21 and 22, 1943, shortly after both the August 4 provincial election and the August 7 election of Communist Fred Rose to the House of Commons in a Montreal by-election.

MacLeod and Salsberg served as Members of Provincial Parliament (MPPs) from 1943 until 1951 and 1955 respectively. A third LPP member, Alexander A. Parent, who was also president of UAW Local 195, was elected as the Liberal-Labour MPP for Essex North in 1945. In January 1946, Parent announced he was breaking with the "reactionary" Liberals and sat the remainder of his term in the legislature as a Labour representative while voting with LPP MPPs MacLeod and Salsberg. He did not run for re-election in 1948.

The party has not been able to win any seats at the provincial level since Salsberg's defeat in 1955. The party continued to run under the Labor-Progressive banner up to the 1959 provincial election, after which it again identified itself as the Communist Party.

Individual members of the party have been elected to school boards in the past few decades; however, they have done so as independents rather than as "Communist Party" candidates. From 2019 until 2025, the party was led by Drew Garvie.

== Election results ==
Election	Leader	# of candidates	# of seats won	±	# of votes	% of popular vote	± (pp)
1929	N/A	5 / 112	0 / 112	New	1,542	0.15%	New
1934	N/A	13 / 90	0 / 90	Steady	9,559	0.61%	0.46▲
1937	N/A	2 / 90	0 / 90	Steady	3,751	0.24%	0.37▼
1943^{1} ^{2}	N/A	6 / 90	2 / 90	2▲	11,888	0.90%	0.66▲
1945^{3} ^{4}	Leslie Morris	31 / 90^{4}	2 / 90	Steady	46,418	2.63%	1.73▲
1948^{3}	A. A. MacLeod	2 / 90	2 / 90	Steady	17,654	1.0%	1.63▼
1951^{3}	Stewart Smith	6 / 90	1 / 90	1▼	11,914	0.67%	0.33▼
1955^{3}	Stewart Smith	23 / 98	0 / 98	1▼	20,875	1.19%	0.52▲
1959^{3}	Bruce Magnuson	9 / 98	0 / 98	Steady	4,304	0.23%	0.96▼
1963^{5}	Bruce Magnuson	6 / 108	0 / 108	Steady	1,654	0.08%	0.15▼
1967	Bruce Magnuson	2 / 117	0 / 117	Steady	592	0.02%	0.06▼
1971	William Stewart	5 / 117	0 / 117	Steady	1,620	0.05%	0.03▲
1975	William Stewart	33 / 125	0 / 125	Steady	9,120	0.28%	0.23▲
1977	William Stewart	32 / 125	0 / 125	Steady	7,995	0.24%	0.04▼
1981	Mel Doig	17 / 125	0 / 125	Steady	5,296	0.16%	0.08▼
1985	Gordon Massie	10 / 125	0 / 125	Steady	3,696	0.1%	0.06▼
1987	Gordon Massie	9 / 130	0 / 130	Steady	3,422	0.09%	0.03▲
1990	Elizabeth Rowley	4 / 130	0 / 130	Steady	1,139	0.03%	0.06▼
1995	Darrell Rankin	5 / 130	0 / 130	Steady	1,015	0.03%	Steady
1999	Hassan Husseini	4 / 103	0 / 103	Steady	814	0.02%	0.01▼
2003	Elizabeth Rowley	6 / 103	0 / 103	Steady	2,187	0.05%	0.03▲
2007	Elizabeth Rowley	8 / 107	0 / 107	Steady	1,715	0.04%	0.01▼
2011	Elizabeth Rowley	9 / 107	0 / 107	Steady	1,163	0.03%	0.01▼
2014	Elizabeth Rowley	11 / 107	0 / 107	Steady	2,290	0.04%	0.01▲
2018	Dave McKee	12 / 124	0 / 124	Steady	1,471	0.03%	0.01▼
2022	Drew Garvie	13 / 124	0 / 124	Steady	2,101	0.04%	0.01▲
2025	Drew Garvie	7 / 124	0 / 124	Steady	2,294	0.05%	0.01▲

Source: Elections Ontario Vote Summary

- September 6, 2012 provincial by-elections: Kitchener—Waterloo, 87 votes (0.19%), seventh out of ten candidates.

Notes

^{1} As the Communist Party had been banned in 1941 under the Defence of Canada Regulations, A. A. MacLeod (Bellwoods) and J. B. Salsberg (St. Andrew) were elected under the Labour ticket, but switched to the new Labor-Progressive Party on its formation shortly after the election. The party operated under the LPP name until and including the 1959 election.
^{2} Results compared to Communist candidates in 1937
^{3} Ran as the Labor-Progressive Party
^{4} In addition, in 1945, the Labor-Progressive Party and Liberal Party of Ontario jointly endorsed 6 Liberal-Labour, 3 of whom were elected, in an effort to marginalize the CCF.
^{5} The party reverted to its original name of the Communist Party as of this election. Results compared to Labor-Progressive Party in previous election.

== Party leaders ==
- Leslie Morris, 1945–1948 (1945 election)
- A.A. MacLeod, 1948–1951 (1948 election)- MPP from 1943–1951
- Stewart Smith, 1951–1957 (1951 election, 1955 election)
- Bruce Magnuson 1957–1970 (1959 election, 1963 election and 1967 election)
- William Stewart 1970–1980 (1971 election, 1975 election and 1977 election)
- Mel Doig (1981 election)
- Gordon Massie (1985 and 1987 elections)
- Elizabeth Rowley (1990 election)
- Darrell Rankin (1995 election)
- Hassan Husseini 1998–c. 2001 (1999 election)
- Elizabeth Rowley c. 2001–2016 (2003 election, 2007 election and 2011 election)
- Dave McKee 2016–2019
- Drew Garvie 2019–2025
- Dave McKee 2025–present

== Constituency associations ==
As of 2026, the party has one constituency association registered with Elections Ontario in Toronto—Danforth

== Party financing ==
Financing of the Communist Party of Canada (Ontario)
Year	Party level		Riding level		Total
Year	Contributions received	Number of contributors over $100	Contributions received	Number of contributors over $100	Contributions received
2007	$13,585.00	32	$1,530	3	$15,115
2008	$39,085.29	63	$3,600	10	$46,685.29
2009	$40,175.25	53	$8,630	20	$48,805.25
2010	$40,032.80	59	$6,020	13	$46,052.80
2011	$19,619.80	36	$400	1	$20,019.80
2012	$48,385.11	64	$635	3	$49,020.11
2013	$35,708.70	61	$170	0	$35,878.70
Total	$236,591.95	368	$20,985	50	$261,576.95

Source: Elections Ontario, Yearly Financial Statements, Political Parties, Constituency Associations

== See also ==
- List of Ontario general elections
- List of Ontario political parties
- Communist Party candidates, 2003 Ontario provincial election
