= 1943 Ontario general election =

Canadian provincial election

- August 4, 1943

90 seats in the 21st Legislative Assembly of Ontario 46 seats were needed for a majority
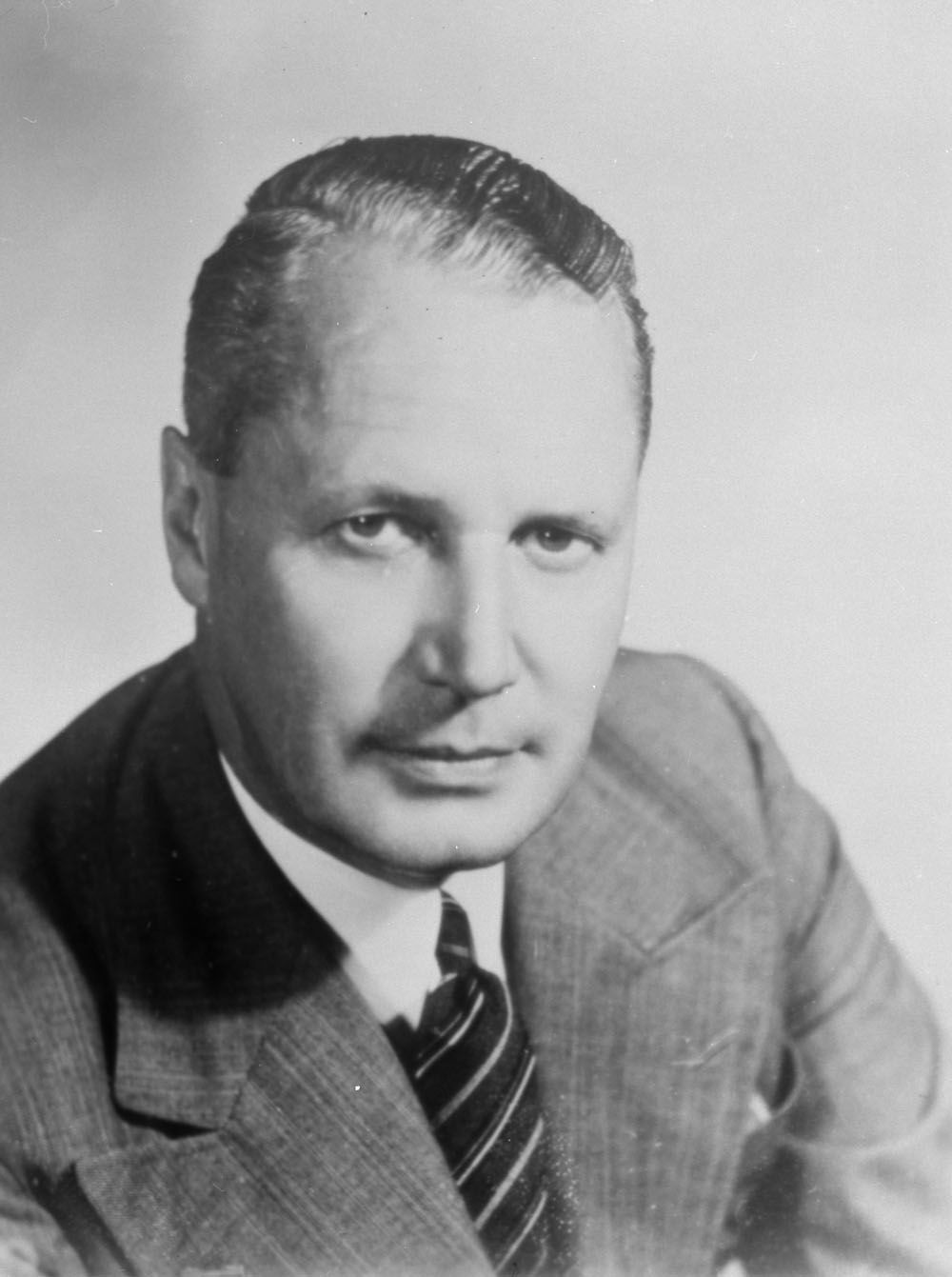

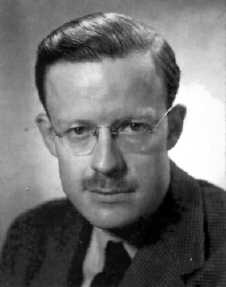

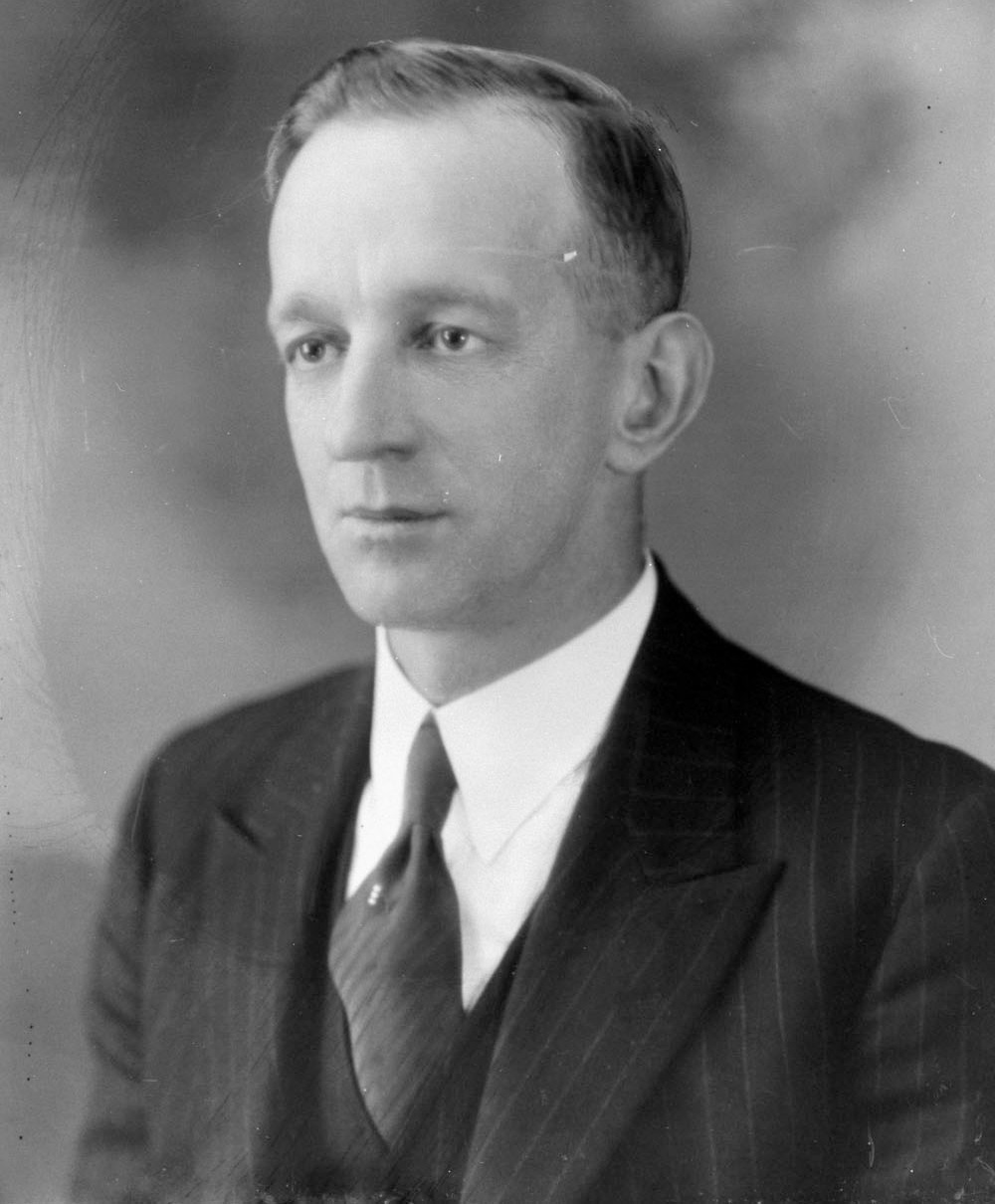
	First party	Second party	Third party
Leader	George Drew	Ted Jolliffe	Harry Nixon
Party	Progressive Conservative	Co-operative Commonwealth	Liberal
Leader since	December 9, 1938	April 3, 1942	April 30, 1943
Leader's seat	High Park	York South	Brant
Last election	23	0	63
Seats won	38	34	15
Seat change	▲15	▲34	▼48
Percentage	35.7%	31.7%	31.2%
Swing	▼4.3pp	▲26.1pp	▼20.4pp
Premier before election
Harry Nixon
Liberal
Premier after election
George Drew
Progressive Conservative

The 1943 Ontario general election was held on August 4, 1943, to elect the 90 Members of the 21st Legislative Assembly of Ontario (Members of Provincial Parliament, or "MPPs") of the province of Ontario.

== Background ==
Because of the outbreak of war, the Legislative Assembly had passed Acts in 1942 and 1943 to defer the calling of a general election. The latter extension had received royal assent in April 1943, but Premier Harry Nixon came into office the following month and opted to call an earlier election on June 30, 1943, for August 4, 1943. Noting that the last extension had been vigorously opposed by the Progressive Conservative opposition, he said, "We know of no precedent in the British Empire where a parliament extended its own life against an opposition vote."

== Campaign ==
Riding contests, by number of candidates (1943)
Candidates	PC	CCF	Lib	Lab	Ind-Lib	Other	Total
2	3		3				6
3	75	74	74		1	1	225
4	9	9	9	2	1	6	36
5	3	3	3		2	4	15
Total	90	86	89	2	4	11	282

== Outcome ==
The Ontario Progressive Conservative Party, led by George Drew, defeated the Ontario Liberal Party government. The Liberal government had disintegrated over the previous two years because of a conflict between Mitchell Hepburn, the Ontario caucus and the federal Liberal Party of Canada.

Hepburn resigned and was eventually succeeded by Harry Nixon in early 1943. The change in leadership was not enough to save the government. The election held later that year resulted in the Conservative Party, recently renamed the "Progressive Conservative Party", winning a minority government. This began forty-two uninterrupted years of government by the Tories who combined moderate progressive policies with pragmatism and caution.

The Liberals fell to third place behind a new force, the socialist Ontario Co-operative Commonwealth Federation (CCF), led by Ted Jolliffe, went from obscurity to form the Official Opposition, winning 32% of the vote and 34 seats in the legislature, just four short of Drew's Tories. The Liberals and their Liberal-Progressive allies fell from 66 seats to a mere 15.

Two members of the banned Communist Party of Ontario running as "Labour" candidates won seats in the Legislature for the first time in this election: A.A. MacLeod in the Toronto riding of Bellwoods, and J.B. Salsberg in the Toronto riding of St. Andrews. Several days following the election the Labor-Progressive Party was officially formed and Salsberg and MacLeod agreed to sit in the legislature as the party's representatives.

The Legislature's first two female MPPs were elected in 1943:

First female MPPs (1943)
Party	MPP	Riding
CCF	Rae Luckock	Bracondale
CCF	Agnes Macphail	York East

== Results ==
Elections to the 21st Parliament of Ontario (1943)
Political party	Party leader	MPPs					Votes		
Political party	Party leader	Candidates	1937	Dissol.	1943	±	#	%	± (pp)
Progressive Conservative	George Drew	90	23	19	38	15▲	469,672	35.75%	3.69▼
Co-operative Commonwealth	Ted Jolliffe	86	–	–	34	34▲	415,441	31.62%	26.30▲
Liberal	Harry Nixon	89	62	59	15	51▼	399,185	30.38%	20.65▼
Liberal–Progressive (Note: Roland Patterson (Grey North), Thomas Aston Blakelock (Halton) and Douglas Munro Campbell (Kent East) ran as Liberal candidates in 1943.)		–	3	2	–	51▼	–	–	20.65▼
United Farmers (Note: Farquhar Oliver (Grey South) became a Liberal on February 24, 1941, upon joining the Cabinet.)		–	1	–	–	51▼	–	–	20.65▼
Labour (Note: A. A. MacLeod (Bellwoods) and J. B. Salsberg (St. Andrew) were elected under the Labour ticket, but switched to the new Labor-Progressive Party on its formation shortly after the election.)		2	–	–	2	2▲	11,888	0.90%	0.15▲
Independent Liberal (Note: Morrison Mann MacBride (Brantford) died in June 1938. Mitchell Hepburn (Elgin) opted not to run as a Liberal candidate in 1943.)		4	1	–	1	Steady	10,123	0.77%	0.55▼
Independent Labour		2	–	–	–		2,215	0.17%	0.16▲
Independent		3	–	–	–		2,540	0.19%	0.06▼
Independent-CCF		1	–	–	–		1,566	0.12%	New
Socialist Labor		3	–	–	–		740	0.06%	0.08▼
Soldier		2	–	–	–		569	0.04%	New
Vacant				10					
Total		282	90	90	90		1,313,939	100.00%	
Blank and invalid ballots							10,746		
Registered voters / turnout							2,269,895	58.36%	12.93▼

Seats and popular vote by party
Party	Seats	Votes	Change (pp)
█ Progressive Conservative	38 / 90	35.75%	-3.69
█ Co-operative Commonwealth	34 / 90	31.62%	26.30
█ Liberal/Lib-Prog/UFO	15 / 90	30.38%	-20.65
█ Other	3 / 90	2.41%	-1.96

=== Vote and seat summaries ===
Ternary plots - shift of electoral support (1937-1943)
1937

1943
Electoral districts identified by colours of winning parties

=== Synopsis of results ===
Results by riding - 1943 Ontario general election (Note: Party affiliations verified with "Tabulation Of Vote For Constituencies; Other Election Gleanings". Ottawa Citizen. August 5, 1943. p. 15.) (Note: Turnouts verified with "Sessional Paper No. 40: Return from the records of the General Election to the Legislative Assembly in 1943". Sessional Papers, No. LXXVI - Part IV. Toronto: King's Printer. 1944. pp. 6–7.)
Riding	Winning party						Turnout (Note: including spoilt ballots)	Votes							
Name (Note: order is as given in EO reports)	1937	Party	Votes	Share	Margin #	Margin %	Turnout	PC	CCF	Lib	Lab	Ind-Lib	Ind	Other	Total
Addington	Con	PC	5,628	51.36%	1,752	15.99%	73.55%	5,628	1,453	3,876	–	–	–	–	10,957
Algoma—Manitoulin	Lib	Lib	3,755	39.03%	729	7.58%	63.52%	2,839	3,026	3,755	–	–	–	–	9,620
Brant	Lib	Lib	5,745	56.79%	3,505	34.65%	52.48%	2,240	2,131	5,745	–	–	–	–	10,116
Brantford	Ind-Lib	CCF	5,327	39.73%	1,045	7.79%	61.93%	3,800	5,327	4,282	–	–	–	–	13,409
Bruce	Lib	Lib	5,066	38.51%	76	0.58%	64.34%	4,990	3,100	5,066	–	–	–	–	13,156
Carleton	Con	PC	5,796	54.79%	2,522	23.84%	51.98%	5,796	1,508	3,274	–	–	–	–	10,578
Cochrane North	Lib	CCF	3,709	46.18%	414	5.16%	74.91%	1,027	3,709	3,295	–	–	–	–	8,031
Cochrane South*	Lib	CCF	12,995	57.01%	7,400	32.46%	67.37%	4,205	12,995	5,595	–	–	–	–	22,795
Dufferin—Simcoe	Con	PC	5,134	49.79%	2,513	24.37%	48.90%	5,134	2,557	2,621	–	–	–	–	10,312
Durham	Lib	PC	4,412	40.70%	286	2.64%	67.13%	4,412	2,303	4,126	–	–	–	–	10,841
Elgin	Lib	Ind-Lib	6,879	50.66%	2,605	19.19%	57.30%	4,274	2,425	–	–	6,879	–	–	13,578
Essex North	Lib	CCF	7,999	53.59%	4,846	32.46%	58.65%	2,405	7,999	3,153	–	1,213	–	157	14,927
Essex South	Lib	PC	3,940	41.51%	132	1.39%	49.25%	3,940	1,743	3,808	–	–	–	–	9,491
Fort William*	Con	CCF	8,701	60.36%	5,620	38.98%	66.56%	3,081	8,701	2,634	–	–	–	–	14,416
Glengarry	Lib	Lib	4,495	59.60%	1,934	25.64%	54.15%	2,561	486	4,495	–	–	–	–	7,542
Grenville—Dundas	Con	PC	6,829	64.92%	3,139	29.84%	48.65%	6,829	–	3,690	–	–	–	–	10,519
Grey North	L-P	Lib	4,826	37.52%	385	2.99%	65.35%	4,441	3,596	4,826	–	–	–	–	12,863
Grey South	UFO	Lib	5,617	50.46%	2,266	20.36%	63.96%	3,351	2,164	5,617	–	–	–	–	11,132
Haldimand—Norfolk	Lib	PC	7,868	44.90%	791	4.51%	61.62%	7,868	2,577	7,077	–	–	–	–	17,522
Halton	L-P	PC	4,474	38.51%	832	7.16%	58.89%	4,474	3,391	3,642	–	–	111	–	11,618
Hamilton East	Lib	CCF	6,739	34.35%	1,079	5.50%	61.82%	5,660	6,739	4,821	–	–	–	2,397	19,617
Hamilton Centre	Lib	CCF	8,592	47.30%	3,578	19.70%	54.23%	5,014	8,592	4,560	–	–	–	–	18,166
Hamilton—Wentworth	Lib	CCF	6,433	36.27%	583	3.29%	64.19%	5,850	6,433	5,453	–	–	–	–	17,736
Hastings East*	Con	PC	4,715	51.55%	1,414	15.46%	65.53%	4,715	1,130	3,301	–	–	–	–	9,146
Hastings West	Con	PC	6,530	47.91%	2,423	17.78%	60.85%	6,530	2,994	4,107	–	–	–	–	13,631
Huron	Lib	PC	4,889	44.00%	470	4.23%	63.64%	4,889	1,803	4,419	–	–	–	–	11,111
Huron—Bruce*	Lib	PC	4,588	38.00%	156	1.29%	66.98%	4,588	3,053	4,432	–	–	–	–	12,073
Kenora	Lib	CCF	4,891	51.77%	1,861	19.70%	70.39%	1,527	4,891	3,030	–	–	–	–	9,448
Kent East	L-P	PC	6,800	58.23%	1,923	16.47%	71.48%	6,800	–	4,877	–	–	–	–	11,677
Kent West	Lib	Lib	7,969	52.00%	2,575	16.80%	56.19%	5,394	1,963	7,969	–	–	–	–	15,326
Kingston*	Con	PC	6,555	46.49%	1,380	9.79%	60.82%	6,555	2,370	5,175	–	–	–	–	14,100
Lambton East	Lib	Lib	4,520	47.34%	778	8.15%	55.41%	3,742	1,285	4,520	–	–	–	–	9,547
Lambton West	Lib	CCF	4,967	35.14%	337	2.38%	68.34%	4,537	4,967	4,630	–	–	–	–	14,134
Lanark	Con	PC	7,126	55.95%	3,242	25.46%	62.15%	7,126	1,726	3,884	–	–	–	–	12,736
Leeds	Con	PC	7,666	51.52%	2,284	15.35%	67.00%	7,666	1,833	5,382	–	–	–	–	14,881
Lincoln*	Lib	PC	10,139	41.46%	2,701	11.04%	62.59%	10,139	7,438	6,880	–	–	–	–	24,457
London	Lib	PC	10,312	40.65%	2,360	9.30%	61.20%	10,312	7,952	7,103	–	–	–	–	25,367
Middlesex North	Lib	PC	4,670	39.00%	780	6.51%	62.32%	4,670	3,414	3,890	–	–	–	–	11,974
Middlesex South	Lib	PC	5,313	48.13%	1,044	9.46%	57.80%	5,313	1,458	4,269	–	–	–	–	11,040
Muskoka—Ontario	Lib	Lib	4,219	34.84%	88	0.73%	56.59%	4,131	3,759	4,219	–	–	–	–	12,109
Niagara Falls	Lib	CCF	7,519	45.76%	2,462	14.98%	61.66%	3,856	7,519	5,057	–	–	–	–	16,432
Nipissing	Lib	CCF	5,642	40.75%	1,637	11.82%	60.90%	2,327	5,642	4,005	–	1,871	–	–	13,845
Northumberland	Lib	PC	7,412	53.45%	2,136	15.40%	68.92%	7,412	1,178	5,276	–	–	–	–	13,866
Ontario*	Lib	CCF	8,745	44.07%	3,170	15.97%	64.58%	5,525	8,745	5,575	–	–	–	–	19,845
Ottawa East	Lib	Lib	11,004	74.70%	8,193	55.62%	43.03%	2,811	–	11,004	–	–	916	–	14,731
Ottawa South	Con	PC	11,870	43.94%	2,559	9.47%	46.69%	11,870	5,579	9,311	–	–	–	252	27,012
Oxford	Lib	PC	7,207	41.73%	1,461	8.46%	58.22%	7,207	4,319	5,746	–	–	–	–	17,272
Parry Sound	Lib	CCF	4,221	40.90%	889	8.61%	61.36%	2,768	4,221	3,332	–	–	–	–	10,321
Peel	Con	PC	7,101	50.27%	3,331	23.58%	62.15%	7,101	3,254	3,770	–	–	–	–	14,125
Perth	Lib	Lib	7,563	39.29%	18	0.09%	59.20%	7,545	4,143	7,563	–	–	–	–	19,251
Peterborough	Lib	PC	6,884	38.82%	800	4.51%	61.99%	6,884	4,763	6,084	–	–	–	–	17,731
Port Arthur	Lib	CCF	7,929	54.28%	3,919	26.83%	73.97%	2,668	7,929	4,010	–	–	–	–	14,607
Prescott	Lib	Lib	5,291	55.72%	1,614	17.00%	61.42%	528	3,677	5,291	–	–	–	–	9,496
Prince Edward—Lennox	Con	PC	5,863	52.64%	1,307	11.74%	60.40%	5,863	718	4,556	–	–	–	–	11,137
Rainy River	Lib	CCF	2,600	39.37%	574	8.69%	69.59%	1,978	2,600	2,026	–	–	–	–	6,604
Renfrew North	Lib	PC	4,185	40.82%	606	5.91%	69.61%	4,185	2,489	3,579	–	–	–	–	10,253
Renfrew South	Lib	Lib	4,921	53.80%	695	7.60%	58.66%	4,226	–	4,921	–	–	–	–	9,147
Russell	Lib	Lib	4,092	56.50%	1,996	27.56%	42.02%	2,096	1,054	4,092	–	–	–	–	7,242
Sault Ste. Marie	Lib	CCF	7,173	55.70%	4,104	31.87%	65.09%	2,637	7,173	3,069	–	–	–	–	12,879
Simcoe Centre	Lib	PC	4,176	41.99%	584	5.87%	55.51%	4,176	2,177	3,592	–	–	–	–	9,945
Simcoe East	Con	PC	4,766	43.76%	1,622	14.89%	59.42%	4,766	2,980	3,144	–	–	–	–	10,890
Stormont	Lib	PC	5,860	42.45%	686	4.97%	64.72%	5,860	2,772	5,174	–	–	–	–	13,806
Sudbury	Lib	CCF	15,169	59.89%	7,587	29.96%	68.43%	1,062	15,169	7,582	–	–	1,513	–	25,326
Temiskaming	Lib	CCF	5,219	54.18%	2,370	24.60%	71.97%	1,565	5,219	2,849	–	–	–	–	9,633
Victoria	Con	PC	6,985	57.36%	2,943	24.17%	62.15%	6,985	1,150	4,042	–	–	–	–	12,177
Waterloo North	Lib	CCF	7,570	41.10%	1,115	6.05%	49.76%	4,392	7,570	6,455	–	–	–	–	18,417
Waterloo South	Lib	CCF	6,831	45.62%	1,958	13.08%	58.13%	3,269	6,831	4,873	–	–	–	–	14,973
Welland	Lib	CCF	8,256	47.35%	3,239	18.58%	59.73%	4,163	8,256	5,017	–	–	–	–	17,436
Wellington North	Lib	Lib	5,556	48.82%	1,358	11.93%	56.64%	4,198	1,626	5,556	–	–	–	–	11,380
Wellington South	Lib	CCF	4,753	38.75%	848	6.91%	59.76%	3,905	4,753	3,607	–	–	–	–	12,265
Wentworth	Lib	CCF	9,963	51.21%	4,680	24.05%	58.73%	5,283	9,963	4,210	–	–	–	–	19,456
Windsor—Walkerville	Lib	CCF	6,711	44.24%	2,377	15.67%	58.41%	4,124	6,711	4,334	–	–	–	–	15,169
Windsor—Sandwich	Lib	CCF	6,455	43.51%	1,332	8.98%	50.63%	5,123	6,455	3,256	–	–	–	–	14,834
York East	Con	CCF	13,384	45.47%	1,740	5.91%	52.30%	11,644	13,384	4,410	–	–	–	–	29,438
York North	Lib	CCF	6,266	36.25%	531	3.07%	56.94%	5,735	6,266	5,283	–	–	–	–	17,284
York South	Con	CCF	11,024	49.32%	2,484	11.11%	48.09%	8,540	11,024	2,788	–	–	–	–	22,352
York West	Lib	CCF	10,720	42.05%	1,308	5.13%	53.77%	9,412	10,720	5,364	–	–	–	–	25,496
Beaches	Con	PC	6,926	43.75%	42	0.27%	59.02%	6,926	6,884	2,021	–	–	–	–	15,831
Bellwoods*	Lib	Lab	4,312	30.37%	526	3.70%	53.58%	3,786	2,681	3,420	4,312	–	–	–	14,199
Bracondale	Lib	CCF	4,681	38.56%	286	2.36%	49.88%	4,395	4,681	2,765	–	–	–	298	12,139
Dovercourt	Con	PC	7,265	43.47%	2,002	11.98%	49.39%	7,265	5,263	2,618	–	–	–	1,566	16,712
Eglinton	Lib	PC	13,832	50.23%	6,887	25.01%	59.15%	13,832	6,759	6,945	–	–	–	–	27,536
High Park*	Con	PC	7,953	41.83%	466	2.45%	59.33%	7,953	7,487	3,422	–	–	–	149	19,011
Parkdale	Con	PC	9,256	44.58%	2,086	10.05%	55.22%	9,256	7,170	4,339	–	–	–	–	20,765
Riverdale	Con	CCF	7,640	44.15%	218	1.26%	49.15%	7,422	7,640	2,244	–	–	–	–	17,306
St. Andrew	Lib	Lab	7,576	53.13%	5,071	35.56%	56.44%	2,505	1,811	2,368	7,576	–	–	–	14,260
St. David	Lib	CCF	5,678	41.11%	619	4.48%	55.13%	5,059	5,678	3,074	–	–	–	–	13,811
St. George*	Lib	PC	7,205	46.81%	2,764	17.96%	49.46%	7,205	4,441	3,316	–	160	–	271	15,393
St. Patrick	Lib	PC	4,694	43.71%	1,616	15.05%	52.33%	4,694	3,078	2,967	–	–	–	–	10,739
Woodbine	Con	CCF	8,848	47.92%	1,616	8.75%	54.10%	7,232	8,848	2,385	–	–	–	–	18,465

* - seat was vacant when election called

= open seat
= turnout is above provincial average
= winning candidate was in previous Legislature
= incumbent switched allegiance for the election
= incumbency arose from byelection gain
= previously incumbent in another riding
= other incumbents renominated
= previously an MP in the House of Commons of Canada
= multiple candidates

=== Analysis ===
Party candidates in 2nd place
Party in 1st place	Party in 2nd place			Total
Party in 1st place	PC	CCF	Lib	Total
Progressive Conservative		8	30	38
Co-operative Commonwealth	15		19	34
Liberal	13	2		15
Labour	2			2
Independent Liberal	1			1
Total	31	10	49	90

Candidates ranked 1st to 5th place, by party
Parties	1st	2nd	3rd	4th	5th	Total
█ Progressive Conservative	38	31	20	1		90
█ Co-operative Commonwealth	34	10	40	2		86
█ Liberal	15	49	25			89
█ Labour	2					2
█ Independent Liberal	1			2	1	4
█ Independent			2	1		3
█ Socialist Labor				2	1	3
█ Soldier				2		2
█ Independent Labour				1	1	2
█ Independent-CCF				1		1

=== Seats that changed hands ===
Elections to the 21st Parliament of Ontario – seats won/lost by party, 1937–1943
Party	1937	Gain from (loss to)														1943
Party	1937	PC		CCF		Lib		Lbr-P		I-Lib		L-Pro		UFO		1943
Progressive Conservative	23				(5)	19						1				38
Co-operative Commonwealth	–	5				28				1						34
Liberal	63		(19)		(28)				(2)		(1)	1		1		15
Labor–Progressive	–					2										2
Independent-Liberal (Note: Morrison Mann MacBride (Brantford) had died in office in 1938. Mitchell Hepburn (Elgin) was re-elected as an Independent-Liberal in 1943)	1				(1)	1										1
Liberal–Progressive (Note: Roland Patterson (Grey North) was re-elected as a Liberal, while Douglas Campbell (Kent East) retired from the legislature.)	2		(1)				(1)									–
United Farmers (Note: Farquhar Oliver (Grey South) was re-elected as a Liberal.)	1						(1)									–
Total	90	5	(20)	–	(34)	50	(2)	–	(2)	1	(1)	1	–	1	–	90

There were 58 seats that changed allegiance in the election.

PC to CCF

- Fort William
- Riverdale
- Woodbine
- York East
- York South

Liberal to PC

- Durham
- Eglinton
- Essex South
- Haldimand—Norfolk
- Halton
- Huron
- Huron—Bruce
- Lincoln
- London
- Middlesex North
- Middlesex South
- Northumberland
- Oxford
- Peterborough
- Renfrew North
- Simcoe Centre
- St. George
- St. Patrick
- Stormont

Liberal to CCF

- Bracondale
- Cochrane North
- Cochrane South
- Essex North
- Hamilton Centre
- Hamilton East
- Hamilton—Wentworth
- Kenora
- Lambton West
- Niagara Falls
- Nipissing
- Ontario
- Parry Sound
- Port Arthur
- Rainy River
- Sault Ste. Marie
- St. David
- Sudbury
- Timiskaming
- Waterloo North
- Waterloo South
- Welland
- Wellington South
- Wentworth
- Windsor—Sandwich
- Windsor—Walkerville
- York North
- York West

Liberal to Labor-Progressive

- Bellwoods
- St. Andrew

Liberal to Independent-Liberal

- Elgin

Independent-Liberal to CCF

- Brantford

Liberal-Progressive to PC

- Kent East

Liberal-Progressive to Liberal

- Grey North

UFO to Liberal

- Grey South

Resulting composition of the 21st Legislative Assembly of Ontario
Source		Party					
Source		PC	CCF	Lib	Lab	I-Lib	Total
Seats retained	Incumbents returned	13		15			28
Seats retained	Open seats held (vacant)	3					3
Seats retained	Open seats held (other)	2					2
Seats retained	Incumbent changed allegiance					1	1
Seats changing hands	Incumbents defeated	13	23		1		37
Seats changing hands	Open seats gained (vacant)	3	3		1		7
Seats changing hands	Open seats gained (other)	4	7				11
Seats changing hands	Ouster of byelection gain by third party		1				1
Total		38	34	15	2	1	90

== See also ==
- Politics of Ontario
- List of Ontario political parties
- Premier of Ontario
- Leader of the Opposition (Ontario)
