= 1959 Ontario general election =

Canadian provincial election

- June 11, 1959

98 seats in the 26th Legislative Assembly of Ontario 50 seats were needed for a majority
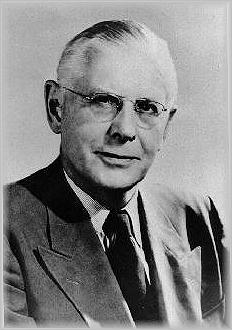

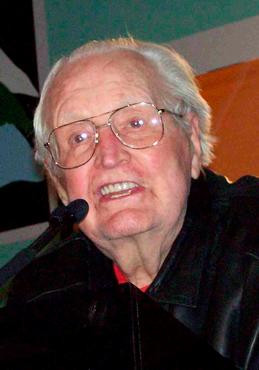
	First party	Second party	Third party
		LIB
Leader	Leslie Frost	John Wintermeyer	Donald C. MacDonald
Party	Progressive Conservative	Liberal	Co-operative Commonwealth
Leader since	April 27, 1949	April 20, 1958	November 21, 1953
Leader's seat	Victoria	Waterloo North	York South
Last election	83	11	3
Seats won	71	22	5
Seat change	▼12	▲11	▲2
Percentage	46.3%	36.6%	16.7%
Swing	▼2.2pp	▲3.3pp	▲0.2pp
Premier before election
Leslie Frost
Progressive Conservative
Premier after election
Leslie Frost
Progressive Conservative

The 1959 Ontario general election was held on June 11, 1959, to elect the 98 members of the 26th Legislative Assembly of Ontario (Members of Provincial Parliament, or "MPPs") of the province of Ontario.

The Ontario Progressive Conservative Party, led by Leslie Frost, won a sixth consecutive term in office, and maintained its majority in the legislature, although it lost 12 of the 83 seats it had won in the previous election.

The Ontario Liberal Party, led by John Wintermeyer, increased its caucus from 11 to 22 members, and continued in the role of official opposition. Liberal-Labour MPP Albert Wren was re-elected and continued to sit with the Liberal caucus. Wren died in 1961 and was succeeded in a by-election by Robert Gibson.

The social democratic Co-operative Commonwealth Federation (CCF), led by Donald C. MacDonald, won two additional seats, for a total of five.

== Campaign ==
Riding contests, by number of candidates (1959)
Candidates	PC	Lib	LL	CCF	Lab-CCF	Lab-Pr	SC	Ind	I-PC	WC	Total
2	17	17									34
3	64	63	1	63	1						192
4	15	15		15		7	4	2	1	1	60
5	2	2		2		2	1		1		10
Total	98	97	1	80	1	9	5	2	2	1	296

== Results ==
Elections to the 26th Parliament of Ontario (1959)
Political party	Party leader	MPPs					Votes		
Political party	Party leader	Candidates	1955	Dissol.	1959	±	#	%	± (pp)
Progressive Conservative	Leslie Frost	98	83		71	12▼	868,815	46.15%	1.91▼
Liberal	John Wintermeyer	97	10		21	11▲	682,589	36.26%	3.46▲
Co-operative Commonwealth	Donald C. MacDonald	80	3		5	2▲	313,834	16.67%	0.13▲
Liberal–Labour		1	1		1	Steady	6,559	0.35%	0.06▼
Independent-PC		2	1		–	1▼	2,119	0.11%	0.29▼
Labor–Progressive	Bruce Magnuson	9	–	–	–		4,304	0.23%	0.96▼
Social Credit	Edgar Shipley Birrell	5	–	–	–		1,740	0.09%	New
Labour-CCF		1	–	–	–		1,512	0.08%	New
Independent		2	–	–	–		832	0.04%	0.48▼
White Canada		1	–	–	–		268	0.01%	New
Independent-Liberal			–	–	–		Did not campaign		
Independent-Social Credit			–	–	–		Did not campaign		
Socialist-Labour			–	–	–		Did not campaign		
Vacant									
Total		296	98	98	98		1,882,572	100.00%	
Blank and invalid ballots							21,272		
Registered voters / turnout							3,187,801	59.72%	1.68▼

=== Vote and seat summaries ===
Ternary plots - shift of electoral support (1955-1959)
1955

1959
Electoral districts identified by colours of winning parties

Seats and popular vote by party
Party	Seats	Votes	Change (pp)
█ Progressive Conservative	71 / 98	46.15%	-1.91
█ Liberal	21 / 98	36.26%	3.46
█ Co-operative Commonwealth	5 / 98	16.67%	0.13
█ Other	1 / 98	0.92%	-1.68

=== Synopsis of results ===
Results by riding - 1959 Ontario general election
Riding	Winning party						Turnout (Note: including spoilt ballots)	Votes							
Name (Note: order is as given in EO reports)	1955	Party	Votes	Share	Margin #	Margin %	Turnout	PC	Lib/LL	CCF	Lab-Pr	SC	Ind	Oth	Total
Algoma—Manitoulin	PC	PC	8,055	41.20%	1,046	5.35%	62.75%	8,055	7,009	4,488	–	–	–	–	19,552
Brant	Lib	Lib	8,512	47.42%	1,166	6.50%	59.81%	7,346	8,512	2,092	–	–	–	–	17,950
Brantford	Lib	Lib	8,011	45.08%	1,460	8.22%	71.17%	6,551	8,011	3,208	–	–	–	–	17,770
Bruce	Lib	Lib	8,940	61.52%	3,348	23.04%	77.24%	5,592	8,940	–	–	–	–	–	14,532
Carleton	PC	PC	6,410	59.85%	2,662	24.86%	49.24%	6,410	3,748	373	–	179	–	–	10,710
Cochrane North	PC	PC	5,596	45.03%	1,319	10.61%	68.18%	5,596	4,277	2,555	–	–	–	–	12,428
Cochrane South	PC	PC	12,247	48.66%	4,659	18.51%	66.66%	12,247	4,750	7,588	585	–	–	–	25,170
Dufferin—Simcoe	PC	PC	8,390	68.90%	4,603	37.80%	52.70%	8,390	3,787	–	–	–	–	–	12,177
Durham	PC	PC	6,946	50.87%	1,974	14.46%	64.13%	6,946	4,972	1,736	–	–	–	–	13,654
Elgin	PC	PC	9,157	51.60%	1,833	10.33%	62.73%	9,157	7,324	963	–	302	–	–	17,746
Essex North	Lib	Lib	12,412	42.00%	3,584	12.13%	66.91%	8,828	12,412	8,313	–	–	–	–	29,553
Essex South	PC	PC	8,356	50.78%	1,001	6.08%	65.35%	8,356	7,355	743	–	–	–	–	16,454
Fort William	PC	Lib	9,255	42.09%	1,336	6.08%	74.77%	7,919	9,255	4,434	–	–	382	–	21,990
Frontenac—Addington	PC	PC	6,834	56.81%	2,238	18.60%	67.37%	6,834	4,596	600	–	–	–	–	12,030
Glengarry	PC	PC	4,575	50.38%	69	0.76%	70.61%	4,575	4,506	–	–	–	–	–	9,081
Grenville—Dundas	PC	PC	8,462	68.78%	4,621	37.56%	56.00%	8,462	3,841	–	–	–	–	–	12,303
Grey North	PC	PC	8,167	55.03%	3,153	21.25%	70.93%	8,167	5,014	1,659	–	–	–	–	14,840
Grey South	Lib	Lib	6,106	52.43%	565	4.85%	75.01%	5,541	6,106	–	–	–	–	–	11,647
Haldimand—Norfolk	PC	PC	13,007	59.37%	4,104	18.73%	64.25%	13,007	8,903	–	–	–	–	–	21,910
Halton	PC	PC	10,385	43.23%	727	3.03%	50.49%	10,385	9,658	3,977	–	–	–	–	24,020
Hamilton Centre	PC	PC	7,287	39.76%	1,314	7.17%	49.97%	7,287	4,602	5,973	467	–	–	–	18,329
Hamilton East	PC	CCF	7,805	41.61%	1,017	5.42%	54.90%	6,788	3,574	7,805	591	–	–	–	18,758
Hamilton—Wentworth	PC	PC	10,453	56.55%	5,958	32.24%	56.98%	10,453	4,495	3,535	–	–	–	–	18,483
Hastings East	PC	PC	6,141	56.95%	1,904	17.66%	65.66%	6,141	4,237	406	–	–	–	–	10,784
Hastings West	PC	PC	10,384	59.06%	4,209	23.94%	58.32%	10,384	6,175	1,023	–	–	–	–	17,582
Huron	PC	PC	7,759	55.84%	1,624	11.69%	76.34%	7,759	6,135	–	–	–	–	–	13,894
Huron—Bruce	PC	PC	6,683	55.42%	1,308	10.85%	76.53%	6,683	5,375	–	–	–	–	–	12,058
Kenora	LL	LL	6,559	44.98%	47	0.32%	69.75%	6,512	6,559 (Note: Albert Wren was already a member of the Legislature)	1,512	–	–	–	–	14,583
Kent East	Lib	Lib	7,352	56.14%	1,608	12.28%	77.45%	5,744	7,352	–	–	–	–	–	13,096
Kent West	PC	PC	9,941	51.15%	446	2.29%	55.95%	9,941	9,495	–	–	–	–	–	19,436
Kingston	PC	PC	10,330	56.53%	3,358	18.37%	63.73%	10,330	6,972	973	–	–	–	–	18,275
Lambton East	PC	PC	6,673	53.69%	917	7.38%	70.91%	6,673	5,756	–	–	–	–	–	12,429
Lambton West	PC	PC	10,861	48.54%	2,094	9.36%	62.60%	10,861	8,767	2,746	–	–	–	–	22,374
Lanark	PC	PC	8,843	62.24%	3,479	24.49%	64.26%	8,843	5,364	–	–	–	–	–	14,207
Leeds	PC	PC	11,318	65.35%	6,010	34.70%	67.15%	11,318	5,308	692	–	–	–	–	17,318
Lincoln	PC	PC	18,089	49.57%	5,998	16.44%	56.06%	18,089	12,091	6,314	–	–	–	–	36,494
London North	PC	PC	9,253	54.97%	3,288	19.53%	54.28%	9,253	5,965	1,615	–	–	–	–	16,833
London South	PC	PC	9,888	50.71%	2,840	14.56%	49.95%	9,888	7,048	2,564	–	–	–	–	19,500
Middlesex North	PC	PC	6,452	62.34%	2,907	28.09%	65.99%	6,452	3,545	353	–	–	–	–	10,350
Middlesex South	PC	PC	9,317	55.98%	3,124	18.77%	59.45%	9,317	6,193	1,132	–	–	–	–	16,642
Muskoka	PC	PC	5,995	56.47%	2,166	20.40%	71.63%	5,995	3,829	793	–	–	–	–	10,617
Niagara Falls	PC	Lib	12,403	52.07%	4,345	18.24%	59.22%	8,058	12,403	3,357	–	–	–	–	23,818
Nickel Belt	PC	PC	8,244	36.86%	453	2.03%	71.16%	8,244	7,791	6,333	–	–	–	–	22,368
Nipissing	PC	Lib	10,390	49.91%	1,870	8.98%	62.87%	8,520	10,390	1,908	–	–	–	–	20,818
Northumberland	PC	PC	10,322	58.28%	3,341	18.87%	79.32%	10,322	6,981	407	–	–	–	–	17,710
Ontario	PC	PC	9,018	59.67%	4,822	31.90%	62.69%	9,018	4,196	1,900	–	–	–	–	15,114
Oshawa	CCF	CCF	10,243	41.98%	1,600	6.56%	56.87%	8,643	5,513	10,243	–	–	–	–	24,399
Ottawa East	PC	PC	7,965	49.27%	313	1.94%	50.87%	7,965	7,652	548	–	–	–	–	16,165
Ottawa South	PC	PC	12,989	51.66%	1,870	7.44%	56.34%	12,989	11,119	1,037	–	–	–	–	25,145
Ottawa West	PC	PC	8,505	51.44%	1,444	8.73%	58.29%	8,505	7,061	969	–	–	–	–	16,535
Oxford	Lib	Lib	11,414	47.39%	216	0.90%	68.65%	11,198	11,414	1,475	–	–	–	–	24,087
Parry Sound	PC	PC	6,540	57.81%	3,044	26.91%	71.19%	6,540	3,496	1,277	–	–	–	–	11,313
Peel	PC	PC	13,278	42.98%	1,203	3.89%	59.45%	13,278	12,075	5,537	–	–	–	–	30,890
Perth	PC	PC	11,791	51.70%	2,458	10.78%	68.36%	11,791	9,333	1,681	–	–	–	–	22,805
Peterborough	PC	PC	13,984	58.17%	6,009	25.00%	58.23%	13,984	7,975	1,834	–	246	–	–	24,039
Port Arthur	PC	PC	10,881	40.88%	2,022	7.60%	70.89%	10,881	8,859	6,874	–	–	–	–	26,614
Prescott	PC	PC	6,587	58.76%	1,964	17.52%	69.19%	6,587	4,623	–	–	–	–	–	11,210
Prince Edward—Lennox	PC	PC	7,249	61.75%	2,758	23.49%	58.08%	7,249	4,491	–	–	–	–	–	11,740
Rainy River	PC	PC	4,896	52.57%	2,283	24.51%	72.26%	4,896	1,804	2,613	–	–	–	–	9,313
Renfrew North	PC	PC	8,448	49.55%	1,118	6.56%	68.64%	8,448	7,330	1,270	–	–	–	–	17,048
Renfrew South	I-PC	PC	8,411	56.96%	2,055	13.92%	79.90%	8,411	6,356	–	–	–	–	–	14,767
Russell	PC	PC	13,940	54.18%	3,445	13.39%	52.82%	13,940	10,495	1,294	–	–	–	–	25,729
Stormont	Lib	Lib	12,109	62.63%	4,884	25.26%	62.87%	7,225	12,109	–	–	–	–	–	19,334
Sault Ste. Marie	PC	PC	8,260	40.10%	1,305	6.33%	59.76%	8,260	6,955	5,386	–	–	–	–	20,601
Simcoe Centre	PC	PC	8,625	52.92%	2,240	13.74%	62.63%	8,625	6,385	1,287	–	–	–	–	16,297
Simcoe East	PC	PC	8,631	57.28%	4,220	28.01%	61.88%	8,631	4,411	1,144	–	–	–	882	15,068
Sudbury	PC	Lib	10,904	44.19%	3,143	12.74%	68.56%	7,761	10,904	6,008	–	–	–	–	24,673
Temiskaming	PC	PC	4,327	41.11%	1,117	10.61%	75.88%	4,327	3,210	2,989	–	–	–	–	10,526
Victoria	PC	PC	11,117	73.98%	8,233	54.79%	65.92%	11,117	2,884	1,026	–	–	–	–	15,027
Waterloo North	Lib	Lib	15,767	43.35%	4,168	11.46%	62.66%	11,599	15,767	9,003	–	–	–	–	36,369
Waterloo South	PC	PC	9,075	42.13%	2,425	11.26%	66.43%	9,075	5,816	6,650	–	–	–	–	21,541
Welland	PC	PC	12,915	47.16%	2,729	9.96%	62.44%	12,915	10,186	4,287	–	–	–	–	27,388
Wellington—Dufferin	PC	PC	7,811	61.17%	2,852	22.33%	69.18%	7,811	4,959	–	–	–	–	–	12,770
Wellington South	Lib	Lib	10,427	50.47%	3,467	16.78%	69.71%	6,960	10,427	3,271	–	–	–	–	20,658
Wentworth	PC	Lib	9,318	37.41%	945	3.79%	58.07%	8,373	9,318	7,219	–	–	–	–	24,910
Wentworth East	CCF	CCF	9,366	51.01%	3,812	20.76%	53.28%	5,554	3,440	9,366	–	–	–	–	18,360
Windsor—Walkerville	PC	Lib	6,340	41.40%	1,024	6.69%	63.05%	5,316	6,340	3,659	–	–	–	–	15,315
Windsor—Sandwich	PC	Lib	8,388	38.23%	1,030	4.69%	55.31%	7,358	8,388	6,197	–	–	–	–	21,943
York Centre	PC	Lib	15,857	36.54%	1,991	4.59%	51.21%	13,866	15,857	13,400	–	–	–	268	43,391
York East	PC	PC	21,827	47.33%	7,545	16.36%	50.17%	21,827	14,282	9,122	–	881	–	–	46,112
York—Humber	PC	PC	11,850	44.02%	3,305	12.28%	52.58%	11,850	8,545	6,522	–	–	–	–	26,917
York North	PC	PC	12,981	47.16%	2,999	10.90%	49.89%	12,981	9,982	4,560	–	–	–	–	27,523
York—Scarborough	PC	PC	18,778	37.26%	1,536	3.05%	50.28%	18,778	17,242	14,380	–	–	–	–	50,400
York South	CCF	CCF	14,478	46.89%	5,303	17.17%	50.06%	9,175	5,531	14,478	456	–	–	1,237	30,877
York West	PC	PC	18,355	44.77%	6,191	15.10%	51.63%	18,355	12,164	10,484	–	–	–	–	41,003
Beaches	PC	PC	7,294	45.90%	2,892	18.20%	57.16%	7,294	4,195	4,402	–	–	–	–	15,891
Bellwoods	PC	PC	6,408	54.96%	3,733	32.02%	57.67%	6,408	2,675	1,867	710	–	–	–	11,660
Bracondale	PC	Lib	4,069	36.59%	391	3.52%	56.40%	3,678	4,069	2,925	–	–	450	–	11,122
Dovercourt	PC	Lib	5,336	34.74%	218	1.42%	54.46%	5,118	5,336	4,434	473	–	–	–	15,361
Eglinton	PC	PC	14,805	57.35%	6,950	26.92%	51.93%	14,805	7,855	3,153	–	–	–	–	25,813
High Park	PC	PC	6,414	37.85%	504	2.97%	57.20%	6,414	5,910	4,229	394	–	–	–	16,947
Parkdale	PC	Lib	9,233	47.05%	2,703	13.77%	56.77%	6,530	9,233	3,862	–	–	–	–	19,625
Riverdale	PC	PC	7,814	51.25%	3,911	25.65%	48.09%	7,814	3,530	3,903	–	–	–	–	15,247
St. Andrew	PC	PC	3,787	42.16%	781	8.70%	53.63%	3,787	3,006	1,655	402	132	–	–	8,982
St. David	PC	PC	5,813	43.70%	1,520	11.43%	51.47%	5,813	4,293	2,971	226	–	–	–	13,303
St. George	PC	PC	7,960	54.31%	3,047	20.79%	49.17%	7,960	4,913	1,783	–	–	–	–	14,656
St. Patrick	PC	PC	5,298	59.21%	2,767	30.92%	51.76%	5,298	2,531	1,119	–	–	–	–	8,948
Woodbine	PC	CCF	7,883	41.87%	267	1.42%	57.44%	7,616	3,330	7,883	–	–	–	–	18,829

= open seat
= turnout is above provincial average
= incumbency arose from byelection gain
= other incumbents renominated
= Liberal-Labour candidate
= Labour-CCF candidate

=== Analysis ===
Party candidates in 2nd place
Party in 1st place	Party in 2nd place			Total
Party in 1st place	PC	Lib	CCF	Total
Progressive Conservative		65	6	71
Liberal	21			21
Liberal–Labour	1			1
Co-operative Commonwealth	5			5
Total	27	65	6	98

Candidates ranked 1st to 5th place, by party
Parties	1st	2nd	3rd	4th	5th
█ Progressive Conservative	71	27			
█ Liberal	21	65	11		
█ Co-operative Commonwealth	5	6	69		
█ Liberal–Labour	1				
█ Labour CCF			1		
█ Labor–Progressive				8	1
█ Social Credit				4	1
█ Independent				2	
█ Independent PC				2	
█ White Canada				1	

Resulting composition of the 26th Legislative Assembly
Source		Party				
Source		PC	Lib	Lib-Lab	CCF	Total
Seats retained	Incumbents returned	63	10	1	3	77
Seats retained	Open seats held	7				7
Seats changing hands	Incumbents defeated		8		2	10
Seats changing hands	Open seats gained		3			3
Seats changing hands	Byelection gains held	1				1
Total		71	21	1	5	98

=== Seats that changed hands ===
Elections to the 26th Parliament of Ontario – seats won/lost by party, 1955–1959
Party	1955	Gain from (loss to)										1959
Party	1955	PC		Lib		CCF		L-L		I-PC		1959
Progressive Conservative	83				(11)		(2)			1		71
Liberal	10	11										21
Co-operative Commonwealth	3	2										5
Liberal–Labour	1											1
Independent-PC	1		(1)									–
Total	98	13	(1)	–	(11)	–	(2)	–	–	1	–	98

There were 14 seats that changed allegiance in the election.

PC to Liberal

- Bracondale
- Dovercourt
- Fort William
- Niagara Falls
- Nipissing
- Parkdale
- Sudbury
- Wentworth
- Windsor—Sandwich
- Windsor—Walkerville
- York Centre

PC to CCF

- Hamilton East
- Woodbine

Independent-PC to PC

- Renfrew South

== See also ==
- Politics of Ontario
- List of Ontario political parties
- Premier of Ontario
- Leader of the Opposition (Ontario)
