= Kenora (provincial electoral district) =

Former provincial electoral district in Ontario, Canada

Ontario electoral district

Defunct provincial electoral district
- Legislature: Legislative Assembly of Ontario
- District created: 1908
- District abolished: 1999
- First contested: 1908
- Last contested: 1995

Kenora was a provincial electoral district in northwestern Ontario, Canada, until 1999.

== History ==
Kenora has been a provincial riding since the early twentieth century. For many years, the Members of the Legislative Assembly (MLAs) that it elected sat as "Labour" or "Liberal-Labour" members.

The riding elected Peter Heenan as a Labour representative in the 1919 provincial election. Heenan remained one of only four Labour MLAs re-elected in the 1923 election. He entered federal politics in the 1925 federal election and was elected a Liberal MP and served as Minister of Labour in William Lyon Mackenzie King's Cabinet.

In the 1929 election, Earl Hutchinson recaptured Kenora as a Labour candidate. He was re-elected in the 1934 provincial election, but gave up the seat to make way for Heenan who was to be appointed to cabinet. Heenan ran in the subsequent by-election, this time as a Liberal Party candidate, and was elected. He joined Mitchell Hepburn's Cabinet and served as Minister of Mines and Forests (1934–1941) and Minister of Labour (1941–1943).

Heenan was defeated by William Docker of the Co-operative Commonwealth Federation (a social democratic party) in the 1943 election that routed the Liberals and reduced them to third party status. Subsequently, the Liberals ran Albert Wren as a "Liberal-Labour" candidate unsuccessfully in the 1948 election before his victory in the 1951 election.

Albert Wren of Kenora was the longest serving "Liberal-Labour" Member of Provincial Parliament (MPP, as MLAs were called after 1938), sitting in the Ontario legislature from 1951 until his death in 1961. He ran for the leadership of the Ontario Liberal Party in 1954, coming in second, and again in 1958, coming in last. Robert Gibson succeeded Wren as the "Liberal-Labour" MPP for Kenora and served until the 1967 election.

T. Patrick Reid was elected "Liberal-Labour" MPP for the neighbouring riding of Rainy River in the 1967 election. He ran as a "Liberal" in the 1971 election, and 1975 election. He reverted to the "Liberal-Labour" label for the 1977 election, and returned to being a "Liberal" MPP in 1981 election, and left politics in 1985.

The riding was abolished into Kenora—Rainy River prior to the 1999 election when provincial ridings were defined to have the same borders as federal ridings. It will not be recreated for the next election, because the ridings in Northern Ontario are not changing provincially.

== Members of Provincial Parliament ==
Kenora
Assembly	Years	Member	Party
12th	1908–1911	Harold Machin	Conservative
13th	1911–1914	Harold Machin	Conservative
14th	1914–1919	Harold Machin	Conservative
15th	1919–1923	Peter Heenan	Labour
16th	1923–1926	Peter Heenan	Labour
17th	1926–1929	Joseph Pattulo Earngey	Conservative
18th	1929–1934	Earl Hutchinson	Labour
19th	1934–1934	Earl Hutchinson	Liberal–Labour
19th	1934–1937	Peter Heenan	Liberal
20th	1937–1943	Peter Heenan	Liberal
21st	1943–1945	William Manson Docker	Co-operative Commonwealth
22nd	1945–1948	William Manson Docker	Co-operative Commonwealth
23rd	1948–1951	James George White	Progressive Conservative
24th	1951–1955	Albert Wren	Liberal–Labour
25th	1955–1959	Albert Wren	Liberal–Labour
26th	1959–1961	Albert Wren	Liberal–Labour
26th	1962–1963	Robert Wayne Gibson	Liberal–Labour
27th	1963–1966	Robert Wayne Gibson	Liberal–Labour
27th	1966–1967	Leo Bernier	Progressive Conservative
28th	1967–1971	Leo Bernier	Progressive Conservative
29th	1971–1975	Leo Bernier	Progressive Conservative
30th	1975–1977	Leo Bernier	Progressive Conservative
31st	1977–1981	Leo Bernier	Progressive Conservative
32nd	1981–1985	Leo Bernier	Progressive Conservative
33rd	1985–1987	Leo Bernier	Progressive Conservative
34th	1987–1990	Frank Miclash	Liberal
35th	1990–1995	Frank Miclash	Liberal
36th	1995–1999	Frank Miclash	Liberal
Sourced from the Ontario Legislative Assembly
Merged into Kenora—Rainy River before the 1999 election

== Election results ==
1995 Ontario general election
Party	Candidate	Votes	%	±%	Expenditures
Liberal	Frank Miclash	9,152	53.72	+13.17	$43,182
Progressive Conservative	Gord Griffiths	5,097	29.92	+21.08	$17,217
New Democratic	Mike Clancy	2,788	16.36	–22.53	$13,143
Total valid votes		17,037	99.07		
Total rejected, unmarked and declined ballots		160	0.93	+0.18	
Turnout		17,197	52.02	–9.66	
Eligible voters		33,061			
Liberal hold		Swing		–3.96	
Source: Elections Ontario

1990 Ontario general election
Party	Candidate	Votes	%	±%
Liberal	Frank Miclash	8,152	40.55	+0.04
New Democratic	Doug Miranda	7,821	38.90	+4.00
Independent	Henry Wetelainen	2,357	11.72	–
Progressive Conservative	Dean McIntyre	1,776	8.83	–15.76
Total valid votes		20,106	99.24	
Total rejected, unmarked and declined ballots		153	0.76	+0.47
Turnout		20,259	61.67	–0.43
Eligible voters		32,850		
Liberal hold		Swing		–1.98
Source: Elections Ontario

1987 Ontario general election
Party	Candidate	Votes	%	±%
Liberal	Frank Miclash	7,943	40.50	+28.55
New Democratic	Doug Miranda	6,845	34.90	+13.55
Progressive Conservative	Mark Duggan	4,824	24.60	–42.10
Total valid votes		19,612	99.72	
Total rejected ballots		56	0.28	–0.03
Turnout		19,668	62.10	+1.20
Eligible voters		31,670		
Liberal gain from Progressive Conservative		Swing		+35.33
Source: Elections Ontario

1985 Ontario general election
Party	Candidate	Votes	%	±%
Progressive Conservative	Leo Bernier	12,574	66.69	+5.86
New Democratic	Colin Wasacase	4,025	21.35	–3.00
Liberal	Mark R. Ducharme	2,254	11.96	–2.85
Total valid votes		18,853	99.69	
Total rejected ballots		59	0.31	–0.02
Turnout		18,912	60.90	+3.01
Eligible voters		31,055		
Progressive Conservative hold		Swing		+4.43
Source: Elections Ontario

1981 Ontario general election
Party	Candidate	Votes	%	±%
Progressive Conservative	Leo Bernier	10,418	60.84	+3.70
New Democratic	Colin Wasacase	4,170	24.35	–3.25
Liberal	Jeff Holmes	2,536	14.81	–0.45
Total valid votes		17,124	99.67	
Total rejected ballots		57	0.33	+0.01
Turnout		17,181	57.89	–9.36
Eligible voters		29,680		
Progressive Conservative hold		Swing		+3.47
Source: Elections Ontario

1977 Ontario general election
Party	Candidate	Votes	%	±%
Progressive Conservative	Leo Bernier	10,882	57.14	+4.72
New Democratic	Bill Watkins	5,256	27.60	–2.62
Liberal	Rupert Ross	2,907	15.26	–
Total valid votes		19,045	99.68	
Total rejected ballots		61	0.32	–0.09
Turnout		19,106	67.24	–0.12
Eligible voters		28,413		
Progressive Conservative hold		Swing		+3.67
Source: Elections Ontario

1975 Ontario general election
Party	Candidate	Votes	%	±%
Progressive Conservative	Leo Bernier	9,584	52.42	–9.02
New Democratic	Bill Watkins	5,524	30.22	+3.42
Liberal–Labour	Fred K. Porter	3,174	17.36	–
Total valid votes		18,282	99.59	
Total rejected ballots		76	0.41	–0.37
Turnout		18,358	67.36	–5.69
Eligible voters		27,254		
Progressive Conservative hold		Swing		–6.22
Source: Elections Ontario

1971 Ontario general election
Party	Candidate	Votes	%	±%
Progressive Conservative	Leo Bernier	11,226	61.44	+3.44
New Democratic	Ernie Brose	4,895	26.79	–1.77
Liberal	J. Richard O'Donnell	2,150	11.77	–
Total valid votes		18,271	99.22	
Total rejected ballots		144	0.78	+0.14
Turnout		18,415	73.05	+8.22
Eligible voters		25,208		
Progressive Conservative hold		Swing		+2.61
Source: Elections Ontario

1967 Ontario general election
Party	Candidate	Votes	%	±%
Progressive Conservative	Leo Bernier	8,297	58.00	+16.23
New Democratic	Robert Clark	4,086	28.57	–0.29
Liberal–Labour	E. Ted Harding	1,921	13.43	–
Total valid votes		14,304	99.36	
Total rejected ballots		92	0.64	–0.27
Turnout		14,396	64.83	–0.60
Eligible voters		22,206		
Progressive Conservative hold		Swing		+8.26
Source: Elections Ontario

Ontario provincial by-election, September 22, 1966 Death of Robert Gibson
Party	Candidate	Votes	%	±%
Progressive Conservative	Leo Bernier	6,335	41.78	+1.94
Liberal	William Francis	4,452	29.36	–16.12
New Democratic	Robert Clark	4,376	28.86	+14.18
Total valid votes		15,163	99.09	
Total rejected ballots		139	0.91	–0.27
Turnout		15,302	65.43	+1.78
Eligible voters		23,386		
Progressive Conservative gain from Liberal–Labour		Swing		+9.03
Source: Elections Ontario

1963 Ontario general election
Party	Candidate	Votes	%	±%
Liberal–Labour	Robert Gibson	6,774	45.48	+0.34
Progressive Conservative	Leo Bernier	5,934	39.84	+4.61
New Democratic	Emile V. Blouin	2,187	14.68	–4.94
Total valid votes		14,895	98.83	
Total rejected ballots		177	1.17	–0.28
Turnout		15,072	63.66	–11.15
Eligible voters		23,677		
Liberal–Labour hold		Swing		–2.14
Source: Elections Ontario

Ontario provincial by-election, January 18, 1962 Death of Albert Wren
Party	Candidate	Votes	%	±%
Liberal	Robert Gibson	7,389	45.14	+0.16
Progressive Conservative	Peter Robertson	5,767	35.23	–9.42
New Democratic	Emile V. Blouin	3,212	19.62	+9.26
Total valid votes		16,368	98.54	
Total rejected ballots		242	1.46	+0.10
Turnout		16,610	74.81	+5.06
Eligible voters		22,203		
Liberal gain from Liberal–Labour		Swing		+4.79
Source: Elections Ontario

1959 Ontario general election
Party	Candidate	Votes	%	±%
Liberal–Labour	Albert Wren	6,559	44.98	+2.75
Progressive Conservative	Howard Keffer	6,512	44.65	+3.46
Co-operative Commonwealth	W. G. Sherman	1,512	10.37	–6.21
Total valid votes		14,583	98.65	
Total rejected ballots		200	1.35	–0.10
Turnout		14,783	69.75	+3.92
Eligible voters		21,194		
Liberal–Labour hold		Swing		–0.35
Source: Elections Ontario

1955 Ontario general election
Party	Candidate	Votes	%	±%
Liberal–Labour	Albert Wren	5,266	42.22	–1.35
Progressive Conservative	Joseph Victor Fregeau	5,138	41.20	–1.17
Co-operative Commonwealth	William G. Carter	2,068	16.58	+2.52
Total valid votes		12,472	98.55	
Total rejected ballots		184	1.45	+0.11
Turnout		12,656	65.83	–0.26
Eligible voters		19,224		
Liberal–Labour hold		Swing		–0.09
Source: Elections Ontario

1951 Ontario general election
Party	Candidate	Votes	%	±%
Liberal–Labour	Albert Wren	4,776	43.58	+9.99
Progressive Conservative	Joseph Victor Fregeau	4,643	42.36	+3.54
Co-operative Commonwealth	Arthur R. Ascough	1,541	14.06	–13.54
Total valid votes		10,960	98.66	
Total rejected ballots		149	1.34	+0.57
Turnout		11,109	66.10	+1.90
Eligible voters		16,807		
Liberal–Labour gain from Progressive Conservative		Swing		+3.23
Source: Elections Ontario

1948 Ontario general election
Party	Candidate	Votes	%	±%
Progressive Conservative	James George White	4,292	38.82	+6.76
Liberal–Labour	Albert Wren	3,713	33.58	+4.20
Co-operative Commonwealth	William Manson Docker	3,051	27.60	–6.32
Total valid votes		11,056	99.23	
Total rejected ballots		86	0.77	–0.14
Turnout		11,142	64.20	–8.46
Eligible voters		17,355		
Progressive Conservative gain from Co-operative Commonwealth		Swing		+6.54
Source: Elections Ontario

1945 Ontario general election
Party	Candidate	Votes	%	±%
Co-operative Commonwealth	William Manson Docker	3,461	33.92	–17.85
Progressive Conservative	James George White	3,271	32.06	+15.89
Liberal–Labour	Arnold S. Dusang	2,998	29.38	–
Labor–Progressive	Harry N. Hawes	474	4.65	–
Total valid votes		10,204	99.09	
Total rejected ballots		94	0.91	+0.00
Turnout		10,298	72.66	+3.11
Eligible voters		14,172		
Co-operative Commonwealth hold		Swing		–16.87
Source: Elections Ontario

1943 Ontario general election
Party	Candidate	Votes	%	±%
Co-operative Commonwealth	William Manson Docker	4,891	51.77	–
Liberal	Peter Heenan	3,030	32.07	–27.20
Progressive Conservative	Harry J. Donley	1,527	16.16	–24.57
Total valid votes		9,448	99.09	
Total rejected ballots		87	0.91	–0.25
Turnout		9,535	69.56	+2.16
Eligible voters		13,708		
Co-operative Commonwealth gain from Liberal		Swing		+13.60
Source: Elections Ontario

1937 Ontario general election
Party	Candidate	Votes	%	±%
Liberal	Peter Heenan	6,597	59.27	–
Conservative	John Fee	4,533	40.73	–
Total valid votes		11,130	98.84	
Total rejected ballots		131	1.16	–
Turnout		11,261	67.40	–
Eligible voters		16,707		
Liberal hold		Swing		–
Source: Elections Ontario

Ontario provincial by-election, 1934 Resignation of Earl Hutchinson to become vice-chairman of Workmen's Compensation Board
Party	Candidate	Votes
Liberal	Peter Heenan	acclaimed
Source: Elections Ontario

1934 Ontario general election
Party	Candidate	Votes	%	±%
Labour	Earl Hutchinson	5,877	62.41	+9.36
Conservative	John Fee	3,540	37.59	–9.36
Total valid votes		9,417	98.91	
Total rejected ballots		104	1.09	+0.32
Turnout		9,521	71.92	+3.60
Eligible voters		13,238		
Labour hold		Swing		+9.36
Source: Elections Ontario

1929 Ontario general election
Party	Candidate	Votes	%	±%
Labour	Earl Hutchinson	3,529	53.04	–
Conservative	Joseph Earngey	3,124	46.96	–5.34
Total valid votes		6,653	99.22	
Total rejected ballots		52	0.78	+0.13
Turnout		6,705	68.32	+16.19
Eligible voters		9,814		
Labour gain from Conservative		Swing		+2.67
Source: Elections Ontario

1926 Ontario general election
Party	Candidate	Votes	%	±%
Conservative	Joseph Earngey	2,641	52.30	–
Liberal–Labour	Hugh McKinnon	2,241	44.38	–
Progressive	Arthur R. Ascough	168	3.33	–
Total valid votes		5,050	99.35	
Total rejected ballots		33	0.65	–
Turnout		5,083	52.13	–
Eligible voters		9,751		
Conservative gain from Labour		Swing		–
Source: Elections Ontario

1923 Ontario general election
Party	Candidate	Votes
Labour	Peter Heenan	acclaimed
Source: Elections Ontario

1919 Ontario general election
Party	Candidate	Votes	%	±%
Labour	Peter Heenan	1,870	49.47	–
Independent	Harold Machin	895	23.68	–
Conservative	Alfred Pitt	610	16.14	–
Liberal	Ashton T. Fife	405	10.71	–
Total valid votes		3,780	97.50	
Total rejected ballots		97	2.50	–
Turnout		3,877	68.70	–
Eligible voters		5,643		
Labour gain from Conservative		Swing		–
Source: Elections Ontario

1914 Ontario general election
Party	Candidate	Votes
Conservative	Harold Machin	acclaimed
Source: Elections Ontario

1911 Ontario general election
Party	Candidate	Votes	%	±%
Conservative	Harold Machin	1,179	61.66	+5.66
Liberal	John Thomas Brett	733	38.34	–5.66
Total valid votes		1,912	98.86	
Total rejected ballots		22	1.14	–0.25
Turnout		1,934	46.40	+5.17
Eligible voters		4,168		
Conservative hold		Swing		+5.66
Source: Elections Ontario

1908 Ontario general election
Party	Candidate	Votes	%
Conservative	Harold Machin	1,078	56.00
Liberal	Andrew Ellis Annis	847	44.00
Total valid votes		1,925	98.62
Total rejected ballots		27	1.38
Turnout		1,952	41.23
Eligible voters		4,734	
Conservative pickup new district.			
Source: Elections Ontario

== See also ==
- List of Ontario provincial electoral districts
- Canadian provincial electoral districts
