= 1955 Ontario general election =

Canadian provincial election

- June 9, 1955

98 seats in the 25th Legislative Assembly of Ontario 50 seats were needed for a majority
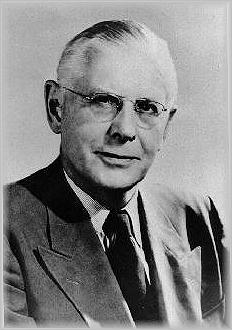

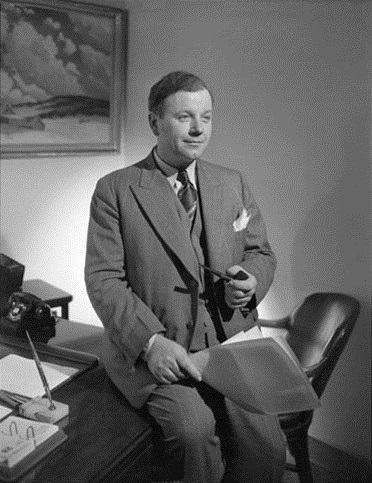

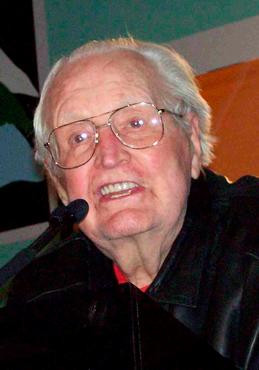
	First party	Second party	Third party
Leader	Leslie Frost	Farquhar Oliver	Donald C. MacDonald
Party	Progressive Conservative	Liberal	Co-operative Commonwealth
Leader since	April 27, 1949	April 9, 1954	November 21, 1953
Leader's seat	Victoria	Grey South	York South
Last election	79	8	2
Seats won	83	11	3
Seat change	▲4	▲3	▲1
Percentage	48.5%	33.3%	16.5%
Swing	±0.0pp	▲1.8pp	▼2.6pp
Premier before election
Leslie Frost
Progressive Conservative
Premier after election
Leslie Frost
Progressive Conservative

The 1955 Ontario general election was held on June 9, 1955, to elect the 98 members of the 25th Legislative Assembly of Ontario (Members of Provincial Parliament, or "MPPs") of the Province of Ontario.

The Ontario Progressive Conservative Party, led by Leslie Frost, won a fifth consecutive term in office, increasing its caucus in the legislature from 79 in the previous election to 83.

The Ontario Liberal Party, again led by Farquhar Oliver, won three additional seats in the enlarged legislature, increasing its caucus from 8 to 11, and continuing in the role of official opposition. Liberal-Labour MPP Albert Wren was re-elected and continued to sit with the Liberal caucus.

The social democratic Co-operative Commonwealth Federation (CCF), led by Donald C. MacDonald, won one additional seat, for a total of three.

The Labor-Progressive Party (which was the Communist Party) lost its last remaining seat with the defeat of J.B. Salsberg.

James Shannon Dempsey (Renfrew South) had his endorsement as a PC candidate withdrawn because of controversy over a political gift, but he was reelected as an Independent PC.

== Pre-election developments ==
=== Franchise reform ===
The Election Act, 1951 was significantly amended in 1954, providing for the following changes to the right to vote in Ontario:

- removal of the disqualification from voting for having been paid to act on behalf of a candidate
- removal of the disqualification from voting for being an inmate maintained in a home for the aged or a house of industry
- extension of the franchise to all Indians living in the province, whether enfranchised or not under the Indian Act
- removal from the voters' list for temporary absence because of being a student, a mariner, or a member of the Canadian, Commonwealth or allied forces

=== Expansion of Legislative Assembly ===
For the first time since the 1934 election, the number of seats in the Legislature was adjusted, rising from 90 to 98. The following changes were made:

- Addington became Frontenac—Addington
- London was divided into London North and London South
- Muskoka—Ontario was reduced to Muskoka, ceding its part of Ontario County to Ontario
- Nickel Belt was separated from Sudbury
- Oshawa was separated from Ontario
- Ottawa West was carved out from Carleton
- Wellington North became Wellington—Dufferin
- Part of Wentworth became Wentworth East
- York Centre was carved out from York North
- York—Humber was separated from York West
- York—Scarborough was ceded from York East

== Campaign ==
Riding contests, by number of candidates (1955)
Candidates	PC	Lib	LL	CCF	I-PC	Lab-Pr	Ind	I-Lib	SC	S-Lab	Total
2	17	16		1							34
3	46	44	2	46	1	1			1		141
4	31	31		31		27	4				124
5	3	3		3		3	1	1		1	15
Total	97	94	2	81	1	31	5	1	1	1	314

== Results ==
Elections to the 25th Parliament of Ontario (1955)
Political party	Party leader	MPPs					Votes		
Political party	Party leader	Candidates	1951	Dissol.	1955	±	#	%	± (pp)
Progressive Conservative	Leslie Frost	97	79		83	4▲	846,592	48.06%	0.40▼
Liberal	Farquhar Oliver	94	7		10	3▲	577,774	32.80%	1.74▲
Co-operative Commonwealth	Donald C. MacDonald	81	2		3	1▲	291,410	16.54%	2.56▼
Labor–Progressive	Stewart Smith	31	1		–	1▼	20,875	1.19%	0.52▲
Liberal–Labour		2	1		1	Steady	7,305	0.41%	0.04▼
Independent PC		1	–	–	1	1▲	7,033	0.40%	0.34▲
Independent		5	–	–	–		9,169	0.52%	0.41▲
Independent Liberal		1	–	–	–		641	0.04%	New
Independent Social Credit		1	–	–	–		602	0.03%	New
Socialist Labor		1	–	–	–		124	0.01%	▼
Independent Labour		–	–	–	–		Did not campaign		
Vacant									
Total		314	90	90	98		1,761,525	100.00%	
Blank and invalid ballots							22,622		
Registered voters / turnout							2,905,760	61.40%	4.17▼

=== Vote and seat summaries ===
Ternary plots - shift of electoral support (1951-1955)
1951

1955
Electoral districts identified by colours of winning parties

Seats and popular vote by party
Party	Seats	Votes	Change (pp)
█ Progressive Conservative	83 / 98	48.06%	-0.40
█ Liberal	10 / 98	32.80%	1.74
█ Co-operative Commonwealth	3 / 98	16.54%	-2.56
█ Other	2 / 98	2.60%	1.22

=== Synopsis of results ===
Results by riding - 1955 Ontario general election
Riding	Winning party						Turnout (Note: including spoilt ballots)	Votes						
Name (Note: order is as given in EO reports)	1951	Party	Votes	Share	Margin #	Margin %	Turnout	PC/UPC	Lib/LL	CCF	Lab-Pr	Ind	Oth	Total
Algoma—Manitoulin	PC	PC	5,725	44.37%	900	6.98%	69.54%	5,725	4,825	2,352	–	–	–	12,902
Brant	Lib	Lib	8,582	52.06%	3,251	19.72%	60.28%	5,331	8,582	2,571	–	–	–	16,484
Brantford	Lib	Lib	7,110	39.55%	372	2.07%	71.81%	6,738	7,110	3,928	200	–	–	17,976
Bruce	PC	Lib	8,609	54.43%	1,918	12.13%	83.40%	6,691	8,609	518	–	–	–	15,818
Carleton	PC	PC	5,153	63.65%	2,210	27.30%	55.97%	5,153	2,943	–	–	–	–	8,096
Cochrane North	PC	PC	5,943	54.02%	3,310	30.09%	64.55%	5,943	2,425	2,633	–	–	–	11,001
Cochrane South	CCF	PC	11,904	49.43%	612	2.54%	65.23%	11,904	–	11,292	887	–	–	24,083
Dufferin—Simcoe	PC	PC	7,778	62.09%	3,731	29.78%	57.70%	7,778	4,047	702	–	–	–	12,527
Durham	PC	PC	6,939	53.36%	2,327	17.89%	67.15%	6,939	4,612	1,454	–	–	–	13,005
Elgin	PC	PC	9,741	60.89%	5,387	33.68%	59.40%	9,741	4,354	1,902	–	–	–	15,997
Essex North	Lib	Lib	10,200	38.79%	649	2.47%	66.30%	9,551	10,200	6,546	–	–	–	26,297
Essex South	PC	PC	8,080	56.71%	1,912	13.42%	60.45%	8,080	6,168	–	–	–	–	14,248
Fort William	PC	PC	8,868	46.78%	3,950	20.84%	71.05%	8,868	4,788	4,918	383	–	–	18,957
Frontenac—Addington (Note: formerly Addington)	PC	PC	6,508	62.39%	3,114	29.85%	65.67%	6,508	3,394	529	–	–	–	10,431
Glengarry	PC	PC	5,635	61.48%	2,104	22.95%	74.41%	5,635	3,531	–	–	–	–	9,166
Grenville—Dundas	PC	PC	7,921	63.56%	3,379	27.11%	59.61%	7,921	4,542	–	–	–	–	12,463
Grey North	PC	PC	8,910	52.74%	1,876	11.10%	81.23%	8,910	7,034	950	–	–	–	16,894
Grey South	Lib	Lib	6,800	51.58%	1,621	12.30%	81.48%	5,179	6,800	1,204	–	–	–	13,183
Haldimand—Norfolk	PC	PC	12,914	56.73%	4,074	17.90%	71.41%	12,914	8,840	1,011	–	–	–	22,765
Halton	PC	PC	8,373	47.31%	2,461	13.90%	54.89%	8,373	5,912	3,414	–	–	–	17,699
Hamilton Centre	PC	PC	8,427	44.72%	2,580	13.69%	47.08%	8,427	3,688	5,847	882	–	–	18,844
Hamilton East	PC	PC	7,444	36.13%	854	4.14%	56.90%	7,444	5,898	6,590	674	–	–	20,606
Hamilton—Wentworth	PC	PC	9,769	58.69%	5,713	34.32%	57.75%	9,769	4,056	2,467	354	–	–	16,646
Hastings East	PC	PC	5,999	60.47%	2,481	25.01%	66.70%	5,999	3,518	403	–	–	–	9,920
Hastings West	PC	PC	11,017	60.95%	5,219	28.88%	63.67%	11,017	5,798	1,259	–	–	–	18,074
Huron	PC	PC	7,890	55.27%	1,505	10.54%	79.31%	7,890	6,385	–	–	–	–	14,275
Huron—Bruce	PC	PC	7,244	55.67%	1,475	11.33%	81.18%	7,244	5,769	–	–	–	–	13,013
Kenora	LL	LL	5,266	42.22%	128	1.03%	65.83%	5,138	5,266 (Note: Albert Wren was already a member of the Legislature)	2,068	–	–	–	12,472
Kent East	PC	Lib	6,940	52.76%	725	5.51%	77.99%	6,215	6,940	–	–	–	–	13,155
Kent West	PC	PC	10,399	54.58%	3,272	17.17%	58.04%	10,399	7,127	1,526	–	–	–	19,052
Kingston*	PC	PC	10,614	57.09%	3,364	18.09%	65.38%	10,614	7,250	728	–	–	–	18,592
Lambton East	PC	PC	6,855	56.41%	1,557	12.81%	71.53%	6,855	5,298	–	–	–	–	12,153
Lambton West	PC	PC	10,767	56.45%	4,924	25.82%	59.81%	10,767	5,843	2,462	–	–	–	19,072
Lanark	PC	PC	11,206	74.85%	7,441	49.70%	68.90%	11,206	3,765	–	–	–	–	14,971
Leeds	PC	PC	10,632	63.34%	4,479	26.68%	68.96%	10,632	6,153	–	–	–	–	16,785
Lincoln	PC	PC	15,903	50.28%	5,204	16.45%	54.94%	15,903	10,699	3,869	519	–	641	31,631
London North	New	PC	9,022	47.70%	1,648	8.71%	61.21%	9,022	7,374	2,518	–	–	–	18,914
London South	New	PC	8,735	45.85%	2,504	13.14%	53.69%	8,735	6,231	3,489	595	–	–	19,050
Middlesex North	PC	PC	5,077	51.38%	563	5.70%	74.36%	5,077	4,514	291	–	–	–	9,882
Middlesex South	PC	PC	9,434	56.72%	2,235	13.44%	67.64%	9,434	7,199	–	–	–	–	16,633
Muskoka	PC	PC	5,256	47.63%	535	4.85%	77.27%	5,256	4,721	1,058	–	–	–	11,035
Niagara Falls	Lib	PC	10,354	48.72%	2,078	9.78%	57.67%	10,354	8,276	2,305	316	–	–	21,251
Nickel Belt	New	PC	7,088	37.98%	1,913	10.25%	71.14%	7,088	5,175	2,039	–	4,359	–	18,661
Nipissing	PC	PC	8,723	51.04%	3,708	21.69%	60.56%	8,723	5,015	2,965	–	389	–	17,092
Northumberland	PC	PC	10,200	63.20%	4,767	29.54%	75.12%	10,200	5,433	507	–	–	–	16,140
Ontario	CCF	PC	7,248	49.97%	1,882	12.97%	69.05%	7,248	5,366	1,892	–	–	–	14,506
Oshawa	New	CCF	9,114	41.16%	2,313	10.45%	61.80%	6,801	5,966	9,114	261	–	–	22,142
Ottawa East	Lib	PC	8,688	51.32%	1,102	6.51%	47.03%	8,688	7,586	654	–	–	–	16,928
Ottawa South	PC	PC	14,151	53.94%	3,167	12.07%	53.21%	14,151	10,984	826	273	–	–	26,234
Ottawa West	New	PC	8,513	57.90%	3,467	23.58%	56.76%	8,513	5,046	1,144	–	–	–	14,703
Oxford	PC	Lib	11,781	48.03%	1,053	4.29%	72.69%	10,728	11,781	2,017	–	–	–	24,526
Parry Sound	PC	PC	6,492	59.58%	3,650	33.50%	69.78%	6,492	2,842	1,562	–	–	–	10,896
Peel	PC	PC	13,296	50.56%	4,600	17.49%	60.38%	13,296	8,696	4,305	–	–	–	26,297
Perth	PC	PC	12,247	53.43%	1,574	6.87%	69.17%	12,247	10,673	–	–	–	–	22,920
Peterborough	PC	PC	11,561	51.63%	3,652	16.31%	58.97%	11,561	7,909	2,920	–	–	–	22,390
Port Arthur	PC	PC	9,517	42.52%	1,776	7.94%	68.38%	9,517	4,347	7,741	775	–	–	22,380
Prescott	PC	PC	6,385	60.26%	2,175	20.53%	65.85%	6,385	4,210	–	–	–	–	10,595
Prince Edward—Lennox	PC	PC	7,003	60.29%	2,390	20.58%	59.15%	7,003	4,613	–	–	–	–	11,616
Rainy River	PC	PC	4,977	60.08%	2,938	35.47%	67.86%	4,977	2,039	1,268	–	–	–	8,284
Renfrew North	PC	PC	8,215	52.34%	2,147	13.68%	70.34%	8,215	6,068	1,411	–	–	–	15,694
Renfrew South	PC	I-PC	7,033	50.72%	708	5.11%	77.83%	7,033 (Note: James Shannon Dempsey was a PC MPP in the previous Legislature)	6,325	509	–	–	–	13,867
Russell	PC	PC	10,392	65.27%	4,862	30.54%	43.05%	10,392	5,530	–	–	–	–	15,922
Stormont	Lib	Lib	10,577	55.51%	2,702	14.18%	66.60%	7,875	10,577	–	–	–	602	19,054
Sault Ste. Marie	PC	PC	7,716	41.77%	1,931	10.45%	63.68%	7,716	4,517	5,785	453	–	–	18,471
Simcoe Centre	PC	PC	8,305	57.39%	2,139	14.78%	62.45%	8,305	6,166	–	–	–	–	14,471
Simcoe East	PC	PC	8,436	54.69%	2,792	18.10%	66.83%	8,436	5,644	1,346	–	–	–	15,426
Sudbury	PC	PC	8,957	39.73%	980	4.35%	71.08%	8,957	7,977	1,657	–	3,954	–	22,545
Temiskaming	PC	PC	6,322	60.24%	2,150	20.49%	73.63%	6,322	–	4,172	–	–	–	10,494
Victoria	PC	PC	10,630	69.61%	7,455	48.82%	68.59%	10,630	3,175	1,465	–	–	–	15,270
Waterloo North	PC	Lib	14,436	44.65%	2,160	6.68%	62.50%	12,276	14,436	5,623	–	–	–	32,335
Waterloo South	PC	PC	8,290	39.97%	1,755	8.46%	68.98%	8,290	5,915	6,535	–	–	–	20,740
Welland	PC	PC	11,815	44.33%	2,409	9.04%	66.90%	11,815	9,406	4,645	787	–	–	26,653
Wellington—Dufferin (Note: formerly Wellington North)	PC	PC	7,720	53.53%	1,651	11.45%	77.71%	7,720	6,069	634	–	–	–	14,423
Wellington South	PC	Lib	9,924	48.38%	1,968	9.59%	76.20%	7,956	9,924	2,634	–	–	–	20,514
Wentworth	PC	PC	6,821	40.77%	1,437	8.59%	57.81%	6,821	5,384	4,201	324	–	–	16,730
Wentworth East	New	CCF	6,505	41.44%	1,949	12.42%	51.34%	4,556	4,294	6,505	341	–	–	15,696
Windsor—Walkerville	PC	PC	7,289	47.22%	2,880	18.66%	61.46%	7,289	3,140	4,409	598	–	–	15,436
Windsor—Sandwich	PC	PC	10,186	54.42%	5,911	31.58%	52.50%	10,186	4,275	4,256	–	–	–	18,717
York Centre	New	PC	12,731	37.72%	1,105	3.27%	56.94%	12,731	11,626	8,742	656	–	–	33,755
York East	PC	PC	18,931	45.86%	7,563	18.32%	52.69%	18,931	11,368	10,982	–	–	–	41,281
York—Humber	New	PC	11,806	44.25%	4,098	15.36%	58.03%	11,806	7,708	6,261	908	–	–	26,683
York North	PC	PC	11,301	48.74%	2,672	11.53%	55.12%	11,301	8,629	3,254	–	–	–	23,184
York—Scarborough	New	PC	13,806	42.22%	1,525	4.66%	53.82%	13,806	12,281	6,287	330	–	–	32,704
York South	PC	CCF	13,877	44.03%	1,426	4.52%	50.57%	12,451	4,168	13,877	1,019	–	–	31,515
York West	PC	PC	14,372	45.79%	4,197	13.37%	55.04%	14,372	6,837	10,175	–	–	–	31,384
Beaches	PC	PC	7,965	48.12%	1,966	11.88%	58.07%	7,965	2,589	5,999	–	–	–	16,553
Bellwoods	PC	PC	5,330	38.43%	233	1.68%	62.97%	5,330	5,097	1,875	1,567	–	–	13,869
Bracondale	PC	PC	4,727	40.40%	1,333	11.39%	55.24%	4,727	2,991	3,394	588	–	–	11,700
Dovercourt	PC	PC	6,288	36.12%	383	2.20%	55.92%	6,288	4,655	5,905	560	–	–	17,408
Eglinton	PC	PC	15,954	55.70%	5,996	20.93%	58.95%	15,954	9,958	2,417	–	315	–	28,644
High Park	PC	PC	7,723	42.39%	2,054	11.27%	58.74%	7,723	4,392	5,669	435	–	–	18,219
Parkdale	PC	PC	7,503	36.92%	730	3.59%	55.04%	7,503	6,773	5,503	542	–	–	20,321
Riverdale	PC	PC	8,771	47.14%	3,623	19.47%	53.44%	8,771	4,236	5,148	329	–	124	18,608
St. Andrew	Lab-Pr	PC	5,019	41.50%	743	6.14%	60.93%	5,019	1,228	1,420	4,276	152	–	12,095
St. David	PC	PC	5,747	37.18%	561	3.63%	59.19%	5,747	4,299	5,186	227	–	–	15,459
St. George	PC	PC	7,593	54.86%	4,119	29.76%	47.64%	7,593	3,474	2,773	–	–	–	13,840
St. Patrick	PC	PC	5,165	54.60%	2,754	29.12%	51.56%	5,165	2,411	1,548	335	–	–	9,459
Woodbine	PC	PC	8,755	43.65%	1,305	6.51%	56.18%	8,755	3,372	7,450	481	–	–	20,058

= open seat
= turnout is above provincial average
= winning candidate was in previous Legislature
= previously incumbent in another riding
= incumbency arose from byelection gain
= incumbent had switched allegiance
= other incumbents renominated
= unendorsed PC candidate
= Liberal-Labour candidate

=== Analysis ===
Party candidates in 2nd place
Party in 1st place	Party in 2nd place					Total
Party in 1st place	PC	Lib	LL	CCF	LP	Total
Progressive Conservative		63	1	18	1	83
Liberal	10					10
Liberal–Labour	1					1
Co-operative Commonwealth	3					3
Independent PC		1				1
Total	14	64	1	18	1	98

Candidates ranked 1st to 5th place, by party
Parties	1st	2nd	3rd	4th	5th
█ Progressive Conservative	83	14			
█ Liberal	10	64	19	1	
█ Co-operative Commonwealth	3	18	58	2	
█ Liberal–Labour	1	1			
█ Independent PC	1				
█ Labor–Progressive		1	1	28	1
█ Independent			2	2	1
█ Social Credit			1		
█ Independent Liberal				1	
█ Socialist Labor					1

Resulting composition of the 25th Legislative Assembly
Source		Party					
Source		PC	Lib	Lib-Lab	CCF	Ind-PC	Total
Seats retained	Incumbents returned	65	5	1			71
Seats retained	Open seats held	6					6
Seats changing hands	Incumbents defeated	3	5		1		9
Seats changing hands	Open seats gained	1					1
Seats changing hands	Byelection gains held	1					1
Seats changing hands	Incumbent changed allegiance					1	1
New ridings	Incumbent returned in new seat	2			1		3
New ridings	New MPP elected	5			1		6
Total		83	10	1	3	1	98

=== Reorganization of ridings ===
The reorganized ridings returned the following MLAs:

1951		1955	
Riding	Party	Riding	Party
Carleton	█ Progressive Conservative	Carleton	█ Progressive Conservative
Carleton	█ Progressive Conservative	Ottawa West	█ Progressive Conservative
London	█ Progressive Conservative	London North	█ Progressive Conservative
London	█ Progressive Conservative	London South	█ Progressive Conservative
Ontario	█ Co-operative Commonwealth	Ontario	█ Progressive Conservative
Ontario	█ Co-operative Commonwealth	Oshawa	█ Co-operative Commonwealth
Sudbury	█ Progressive Conservative	Nickel Belt	█ Progressive Conservative
Sudbury	█ Progressive Conservative	Sudbury	█ Progressive Conservative
Wentworth	█ Progressive Conservative	Wentworth	█ Progressive Conservative
Wentworth	█ Progressive Conservative	Wentworth East	█ Co-operative Commonwealth
York East	█ Progressive Conservative	York East	█ Progressive Conservative
York East	█ Progressive Conservative	York—Scarborough	█ Progressive Conservative
York North	█ Progressive Conservative	York Centre	█ Progressive Conservative
York North	█ Progressive Conservative	York North	█ Progressive Conservative
York West	█ Progressive Conservative	York—Humber	█ Progressive Conservative
York West	█ Progressive Conservative	York West	█ Progressive Conservative

== See also ==
- Politics of Ontario
- List of Ontario political parties
- Premier of Ontario
- Leader of the Opposition (Ontario)
