= 1951 Ontario general election =

Canadian provincial election

- November 22, 1951

90 seats in the 24th Legislative Assembly of Ontario 46 seats were needed for a majority
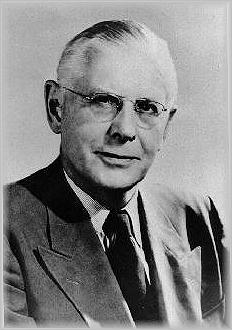

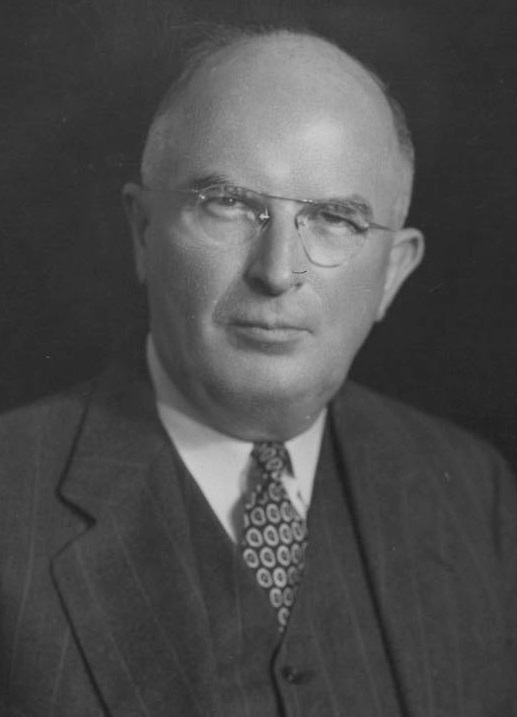

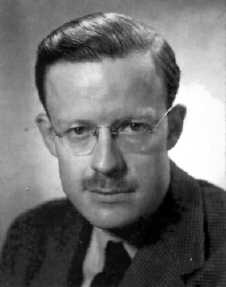

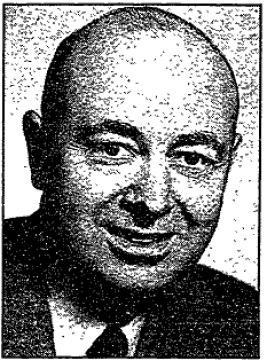
	First party	Second party
Leader	Leslie Frost	Walter Thomson
Party	Progressive Conservative	Liberal
Leader since	April 27, 1949	November 10, 1950
Leader's seat	Victoria	Ran in Ontario (Lost)
Last election	53	14
Seats won	79	8
Seat change	▲26	▼6
Percentage	48.5%	31.5%
Swing	▲7.0pp	▲1.7pp
	Third party	Fourth party
Leader	Ted Jolliffe	Stewart Smith
Party	Co-operative Commonwealth	Labor-Progressive
Leader since	April 3, 1942	1951
Leader's seat	York South (lost re-election)
Last election	21	2
Seats won	2	1
Seat change	▼19	▼1
Percentage	19.1%	0.7%
Swing	▼3.3pp	▼0.3pp
Premier before election
Leslie Frost
Progressive Conservative
Premier after election
Leslie Frost
Progressive Conservative

The 1951 Ontario general election was held on November 22, 1951, to elect the 90 members of the 24th Legislative Assembly of Ontario (Members of Provincial Parliament, or "MPPs") of the province of Ontario.

== Background ==
Because of Canada's participation in the Korean War, and because previous legislation governing the participation of active service voters stationed overseas had lapsed, new provision was made to enable the collection of votes of Ontario residents who had returned to active service because of the present conflict. Legislation governing the functioning of elections and the preparation of voters' lists was also revised.

== Opinion Polls ==
Evolution of voting intentions at provincial level
Polling firm	Last day of survey	Source	PCO	OLP	OCCF	Other	Undecided	ME	Sample
Election 1953	November 22, 1951		48.5	31.5	19.1	0.9			
Gallup	October 1951		44	40	14	3	22	—N/a	—N/a
Gallup	August 1951		47	40	11	1	30	—N/a	—N/a
Gallup	June 1951		45	41	13	1	—N/a	—N/a	
Gallup	February 1951		43	42	14	1	23	—N/a	—N/a
Gallup	July 1950		44	39	14	3	21	—N/a	—N/a
Election 1948	June 7, 1948		41.28	26.52	29.78	2.42			

== Campaign ==
The majority of races were three-way contests between the major parties:

Riding contests, by number of candidates (1951)
Candidates	PC	Lib	L-L	CCF	Lab-Pr	I-PC	I-Lab	Ind	S-L	Total
2	13	13								26
3	64	62	2	64						192
4	12	12		12	5	2	1	3	1	48
5	1	1		1	1			1		5
Total	90	88	2	77	6	2	1	4	1	271

== Outcome ==
The Ontario Progressive Conservative Party, led by Leslie Frost, won a fourth consecutive term in office, increasing its caucus in the legislature from 53 in the previous election to 79—a solid majority.

The Ontario Liberal Party, led by Walter Thomson, lost six seats, but regained the role of official opposition because of the collapse of the CCF vote. Albert Wren was elected as a Liberal-Labour candidate and sat with the Liberal caucus.

The social democratic Co-operative Commonwealth Federation (CCF), led by Ted Jolliffe, lost all but two of its previous 21 seats with Jolliffe himself being defeated in the riding of York South.

One seat was won by J.B. Salsberg of the Labor-Progressive Party (which was the Communist Party of Ontario). LPP leader A.A. MacLeod lost his downtown Toronto seat of Bellwoods in this election and three other LPP candidates were also defeated.

== Results ==
Elections to the 24th Parliament of Ontario (1951)
Political party	Party leader	MPPs					Votes		
Political party	Party leader	Candidates	1948	Dissol.	1951	±	#	%	± (pp)
Progressive Conservative	Leslie Frost	90	53	53	79	26▲	860,939	48.46	7.18▲
Liberal	Walter Thomson	88	13	13	7	6▼	551,753	31.06	1.72▲
Liberal–Labour		2	1	1	1	6▼	7,939	0.45	1.72▲
Co-operative Commonwealth	Ted Jolliffe	77	21	21	2	19▼	339,362	19.10	7.42▼
Labor–Progressive	Stewart Smith	6	2	2	1	1▼	11,914	0.67	0.33▼
Independent		4					1,869	0.11	0.01▲
Independent Labour		1					1,375	0.08	0.07▲
Independent PC		2					1,094	0.06	0.13▼
Socialist Labor		1					371	0.02	0.03▼
Total		271	90	90	90		1,776,616	100.00%	
Blank and invalid ballots							23,834		
Registered voters / turnout							2,745,709	65.57%	2.09▼

=== Vote and seat summaries ===
Ternary plots - shift of electoral support (1948-1951)
1948

1951
Electoral districts identified by colours of winning parties

Seats and popular vote by party
Party	Seats	Votes	Change (pp)
█ Progressive Conservative	79 / 90	48.46%	7.18
█ Liberal/Liberal-Labour	8 / 90	31.51%	1.72
█ Co-operative Commonwealth	2 / 90	19.10%	-7.42
█ Other	1 / 90	0.93%	-1.48

=== Synopsis of results ===
Results by riding - 1951 Ontario general election
Riding	Winning party						Turnout (Note: including spoilt ballots)	Votes								
Name (Note: order is as given in EO reports)	1948	Party	Votes	Share	Margin #	Margin %	Turnout	PC	Lib/LL	CCF	Lab-Pr	I-PC	I-Lab	Ind	S-Lab	Total
Addington	PC	PC	7,035	56.04%	2,328	18.55%	73.26%	7,035	4,707	811	–	–	–	–	–	12,553
Algoma—Manitoulin	PC	PC	5,718	47.18%	1,138	9.39%	68.95%	5,718	4,580	1,822	–	–	–	–	–	12,120
Brant	Lib	Lib	8,218	47.49%	1,795	10.37%	70.36%	6,423	8,218	2,665	–	–	–	–	–	17,306
Brantford	Lib	Lib	7,289	38.45%	1,249	6.59%	73.74%	5,630	7,289	6,040	–	–	–	–	–	18,959
Bruce	Lib	PC	7,369	48.93%	652	4.33%	77.21%	7,369	6,717	973	–	–	–	–	–	15,059
Carleton	PC	PC	10,863	59.00%	5,398	29.32%	64.28%	10,863	5,465	1,138	–	945	–	–	–	18,411
Cochrane North	PC	PC	4,009	40.28%	461	4.63%	66.79%	4,009	3,548	2,395	–	–	–	–	–	9,952
Cochrane South	CCF	CCF	10,233	40.82%	1,606	6.41%	69.52%	8,627	5,391	10,233	820	–	–	–	–	25,071
Dufferin—Simcoe	PC	PC	7,535	58.33%	2,966	22.96%	62.52%	7,535	4,569	814	–	–	–	–	–	12,918
Durham	PC	PC	7,389	51.79%	2,279	15.97%	76.75%	7,389	5,110	1,769	–	–	–	–	–	14,268
Elgin	PC	PC	10,501	55.08%	3,367	17.66%	69.74%	10,501	7,134	1,430	–	–	–	–	–	19,065
Essex North	CCF	Lib	10,051	39.85%	2,243	8.89%	70.07%	7,808	10,051	7,362	–	–	–	–	–	25,221
Essex South	PC	PC	9,797	64.50%	5,266	34.67%	66.29%	9,797	4,531	861	–	–	–	–	–	15,189
Fort William	Lib	PC	8,057	42.60%	722	3.82%	72.57%	8,057	7,335	3,157	–	–	–	366	–	18,915
Glengarry	PC	PC	5,298	55.23%	1,003	10.46%	76.01%	5,298	4,295	–	–	–	–	–	–	9,593
Grenville—Dundas	PC	PC	7,797	66.01%	3,783	32.03%	56.63%	7,797	4,014	0	–	–	–	–	–	11,811
Grey North	PC	PC	9,068	58.74%	4,813	31.18%	74.85%	9,068	4,255	2,115	–	–	–	–	–	15,438
Grey South	Lib	Lib	6,256	49.44%	939	7.42%	76.75%	5,317	6,256	1,080	–	–	–	–	–	12,653
Haldimand—Norfolk	PC	PC	11,298	51.58%	2,430	11.09%	69.31%	11,298	8,868	1,739	–	–	–	–	–	21,905
Halton	PC	PC	9,063	51.61%	2,762	15.73%	67.60%	9,063	6,301	2,197	–	–	–	–	–	17,561
Hamilton East	CCF	PC	9,336	44.36%	1,850	8.79%	51.77%	9,336	4,224	7,486	–	–	–	–	–	21,046
Hamilton Centre	CCF	PC	7,753	42.44%	1,577	8.63%	61.16%	7,753	4,341	6,176	–	–	–	–	–	18,270
Hamilton—Wentworth	PC	PC	11,865	55.58%	6,800	31.85%	63.10%	11,865	5,065	4,417	–	–	–	–	–	21,347
Hastings East*	PC	PC	6,294	56.76%	2,198	19.82%	72.42%	6,294	4,096	699	–	–	–	–	–	11,089
Hastings West	PC	PC	10,299	55.37%	3,279	17.63%	70.78%	10,299	7,020	1,283	–	–	–	–	–	18,602
Huron	PC	PC	8,005	54.88%	1,424	9.76%	80.51%	8,005	6,581	–	–	–	–	–	–	14,586
Huron—Bruce	PC	PC	7,431	58.48%	2,155	16.96%	76.89%	7,431	5,276	–	–	–	–	–	–	12,707
Kenora	PC	LL	4,776	43.58%	133	1.21%	66.00%	4,643	4,776	1,541	–	–	–	–	–	10,960
Kent East	Lib	PC	6,891	56.75%	1,640	13.51%	72.82%	6,891	5,251	0	–	–	–	–	–	12,142
Kent West	PC	PC	12,194	55.26%	3,858	17.48%	68.55%	12,194	8,336	1,536	–	–	–	–	–	22,066
Kingston*	PC	PC	9,924	57.34%	3,518	20.33%	74.21%	9,924	6,406	978	–	–	–	–	–	17,308
Lambton East	PC	PC	6,610	58.35%	1,891	16.69%	67.25%	6,610	4,719	–	–	–	–	–	–	11,329
Lambton West	PC	PC	10,814	59.13%	5,983	32.72%	64.16%	10,814	4,831	2,642	–	–	–	–	–	18,287
Lanark	PC	PC	12,071	77.56%	9,109	58.53%	70.02%	12,071	2,962	531	–	–	–	–	–	15,564
Leeds	PC	PC	10,658	61.01%	3,848	22.03%	74.32%	10,658	6,810	–	–	–	–	–	–	17,468
Lincoln	PC	PC	15,477	45.61%	5,887	17.35%	65.01%	15,477	9,590	8,032	–	–	–	834	–	33,933
London	Lib	PC	13,926	47.38%	3,112	10.59%	61.06%	13,926	10,814	4,655	–	–	–	–	–	29,395
Middlesex North	PC	PC	8,607	49.29%	2,981	17.07%	57.63%	8,607	5,626	3,229	–	–	–	–	–	17,462
Middlesex South	PC	PC	8,461	58.27%	3,324	22.89%	65.08%	8,461	5,137	922	–	–	–	–	–	14,520
Muskoka—Ontario	PC	PC	9,370	54.17%	2,807	16.23%	73.86%	9,370	6,563	1,364	–	–	–	–	–	17,297
Niagara Falls	Lib	Lib	10,209	48.79%	3,263	15.59%	61.57%	6,946	10,209	3,769	–	–	–	–	–	20,924
Nipissing	PC	PC	8,219	46.73%	1,409	8.01%	65.11%	8,219	6,810	2,561	–	–	–	–	–	17,590
Northumberland	PC	PC	10,140	62.43%	4,039	24.87%	78.11%	10,140	6,101	–	–	–	–	–	–	16,241
Ontario	CCF	CCF	12,054	40.17%	2,178	7.26%	71.44%	9,876	7,806	12,054	–	–	–	268	–	30,004
Ottawa East	Lib	Lib	10,722	50.08%	2,275	10.63%	58.34%	8,447	10,722	2,242	–	–	–	–	–	21,411
Ottawa South	PC	PC	19,908	55.98%	7,464	20.99%	59.72%	19,908	12,444	3,212	–	–	–	–	–	35,564
Oxford	PC	PC	10,026	45.17%	196	0.88%	68.16%	10,026	9,830	2,338	–	–	–	–	–	22,194
Parry Sound	PC	PC	6,348	60.24%	2,158	20.48%	68.87%	6,348	4,190	–	–	–	–	–	–	10,538
Peel	PC	PC	12,528	56.61%	6,817	30.80%	66.22%	12,528	5,711	3,893	–	–	–	–	–	22,132
Perth	PC	PC	11,697	50.21%	2,577	11.06%	69.05%	11,697	9,120	2,477	–	–	–	–	–	23,294
Peterborough	PC	PC	14,442	58.48%	6,802	27.54%	67.14%	14,442	7,640	2,614	–	–	–	–	–	24,696
Port Arthur	CCF	PC	7,758	37.38%	1,586	7.64%	63.89%	7,758	5,447	6,172	–	–	1,375 (Note: Bruce Magnuson, who later became the Labor-Progressive leader in Ontario in 1956)	–	–	20,752
Prescott	PC	PC	7,046	57.11%	1,960	15.89%	76.77%	7,046	5,086	56	–	149	–	–	–	12,337
Prince Edward—Lennox	Lib	PC	7,565	54.30%	1,197	8.59%	100.23%	7,565	6,368	–	–	–	–	–	–	13,933
Rainy River	LL	PC	3,633	44.04%	470	5.70%	72.52%	3,633	3,163	1,454	–	–	–	–	–	8,250
Renfrew North	PC	PC	7,769	57.93%	2,127	15.86%	67.59%	7,769	5,642	–	–	–	–	–	–	13,411
Renfrew South	PC	PC	6,875	56.00%	1,937	15.78%	68.97%	6,875	4,938	463	–	–	–	–	–	12,276
Russell	PC	PC	6,946	44.31%	10	0.06%	55.68%	6,946	6,936	1,794	–	–	–	–	–	15,676
Sault Ste. Marie	CCF	PC	7,359	39.42%	1,308	7.01%	71.24%	7,359	6,051	5,257	–	–	–	–	–	18,667
Simcoe Centre	PC	PC	7,721	57.03%	1,903	14.06%	62.02%	7,721	5,818	–	–	–	–	–	–	13,539
Simcoe East	PC	PC	8,634	55.91%	3,565	23.08%	72.59%	8,634	5,069	1,741	–	–	–	–	–	15,444
Stormont	PC	Lib	9,383	50.32%	1,680	9.01%	70.95%	7,703	9,383	1,560	–	–	–	–	–	18,646
Sudbury	PC	PC	14,056	44.91%	2,418	7.73%	65.77%	14,056	11,638	5,605	–	–	–	–	–	31,299
Temiskaming	CCF	PC	4,328	39.53%	663	6.05%	73.61%	4,328	2,957	3,665	–	–	–	–	–	10,950
Victoria	PC	PC	12,423	81.02%	9,512	62.03%	69.66%	12,423	2,911	–	–	–	–	–	–	15,334
Waterloo North	Lib	PC	9,873	35.22%	161	0.57%	58.54%	9,873	9,712	8,445	–	–	–	–	–	28,030
Waterloo South	CCF	PC	8,239	40.57%	1,249	6.15%	68.30%	8,239	5,078	6,990	–	–	–	–	–	20,307
Welland	Lib	PC	10,390	40.27%	482	1.87%	68.83%	10,390	9,908	4,709	791	–	–	–	–	25,798
Wellington North	Lib	PC	7,159	49.85%	602	4.19%	75.90%	7,159	6,557	645	–	–	–	–	–	14,361
Wellington South	PC	PC	8,208	43.65%	2,235	11.88%	71.77%	8,208	5,973	4,625	–	–	–	–	–	18,806
Wentworth	CCF	PC	11,004	37.97%	408	1.41%	53.08%	11,004	7,383	10,596	–	–	–	–	–	28,983
Windsor—Walkerville	PC	PC	8,858	48.60%	3,801	20.86%	66.24%	8,858	3,451	5,057	859	–	–	–	–	18,225
Windsor—Sandwich	PC	PC	11,666	53.32%	6,501	29.71%	63.81%	11,666	5,050	5,165	–	–	–	–	–	21,881
York East	CCF	PC	30,944	47.78%	8,708	13.45%	56.23%	30,944	11,581	22,236	–	–	–	–	–	64,761
York North	PC	PC	19,518	49.00%	8,159	20.48%	59.64%	19,518	11,359	8,955	–	–	–	–	–	39,832
York South	CCF	PC	13,760	39.61%	514	1.48%	58.74%	13,760	6,870	13,246	867	–	–	–	–	34,743
York West	CCF	PC	24,614	47.62%	7,573	14.65%	65.39%	24,614	10,034	17,041	–	–	–	–	–	51,689
Beaches	CCF	PC	9,904	49.28%	2,679	13.33%	66.15%	9,904	2,970	7,225	–	–	–	–	–	20,099
Bellwoods	Lab-Pr	PC	5,571	33.39%	298	1.79%	64.56%	5,571	5,273	2,483	3,357	–	–	–	–	16,684
Bracondale	CCF	PC	6,213	42.17%	1,720	11.67%	59.11%	6,213	4,028	4,493	–	–	–	–	–	14,734
Dovercourt	CCF	PC	8,595	38.98%	462	2.10%	59.97%	8,595	5,321	8,133	–	–	–	–	–	22,049
Eglinton	PC	PC	21,876	65.20%	14,783	44.06%	66.98%	21,876	7,093	4,585	–	–	–	–	–	33,554
High Park	CCF	PC	10,360	44.30%	2,399	10.26%	67.71%	10,360	5,065	7,961	–	–	–	–	–	23,386
Parkdale	CCF	PC	10,914	42.58%	2,501	9.76%	61.82%	10,914	6,304	8,413	–	–	–	–	–	25,631
Riverdale	CCF	PC	10,736	45.57%	3,570	15.15%	60.36%	10,736	5,285	7,166	–	–	–	–	371	23,558
St. Andrew	Lab-Pr	Lab-Pr	5,220	38.85%	1,365	10.16%	56.64%	3,855	2,046	1,915	5,220	–	–	401	–	13,437
St. David	CCF	PC	6,880	40.64%	1,232	7.28%	57.90%	6,880	4,401	5,648	–	–	–	–	–	16,929
St. George	PC	PC	10,333	56.86%	5,904	32.49%	54.42%	10,333	3,410	4,429	–	–	–	–	–	18,172
St. Patrick	PC	PC	7,400	57.97%	4,496	35.22%	53.52%	7,400	2,462	2,904	–	–	–	–	–	12,766
Woodbine	CCF	PC	10,445	43.97%	1,167	4.91%	61.78%	10,445	4,030	9,278	–	–	–	–	–	23,753

= open seat
= turnout is above provincial average
= winning candidate was in previous Legislature
= incumbent had switched allegiance
= other incumbents renominated
= campaigned as a Liberal-Labour candidate

=== Analysis ===
Party candidates in 2nd place
Party in 1st place	Party in 2nd place				Total
Party in 1st place	PC	Lib	LL	CCF	Total
Progressive Conservative		57	1	21	79
Liberal	6			1	7
Liberal–Labour	1				1
Co-operative Commonwealth	2				2
Labor–Progressive	1				1
Total	10	57	1	22	90

Candidates ranked 1st to 5th place, by party
Parties	1st	2nd	3rd	4th	5th	Total
█ Progressive Conservative	79	10	1			90
█ Liberal	7	57	24			88
█ Co-operative Commonwealth	2	22	50	3		77
█ Liberal–Labour	1	1				2
█ Labor–Progressive	1		1	4		6
█ Independent PC			1	1		2
█ Independent				3	1	4
█ Independent Labour				1		1
█ Socialist Labor				1		1

Resulting composition of the 24th Legislative Assembly of Ontario
Source		Party					
Source		PC	Lib	L-L	CCF	Lab-Pr	Total
Seats retained	Incumbents returned	44	5		2	1	
Seats retained	Open seats held	7					
Seats changing hands	Incumbents defeated	26	2				
Seats changing hands	Open seats gained	2		1			
Total		79	7	1	2	1	90

=== Seats that changed hands ===
Elections to the 24th Parliament of Ontario – seats won/lost by party, 1948–1951
Party	1948	Gain from (loss to)										1951
Party	1948	PC		Lib		CCF		Lbr-P		L-L		1951
Progressive Conservative	53			8	(1)	18		1				79
Liberal	13	1	(8)			1						7
Co-operative Commonwealth	21		(18)		(1)							2
Labor–Progressive	2		(1)									1
Liberal–Labour	1	1	(1)									1
Total	90	2	(28)	8	(2)	19	–	1	–	–	–	90

There were 29 seats that changed allegiance in the election.

CCF to PC

- Beaches
- Bracondale
- Dovercourt
- Hamilton Centre
- Hamilton East
- High Park
- Parkdale
- Port Arthur
- Riverdale
- Sault Ste. Marie
- St. David
- Timiskaming
- Waterloo South
- Wentworth
- Woodbine
- York East
- York South
- York West

CCF to Liberal

- Essex North

PC to Liberal

- Stormont

PC to Liberal-Labour

- Kenora

Liberal to PC

- Bruce
- Fort William
- Kent East
- London
- Prince Edward—Lennox
- Waterloo North
- Welland
- Wellington North

Labor-Progressive to PC

- Bellwoods

Liberal-Labour to PC

- Rainy River

== See also ==
- Politics of Ontario
- List of Ontario political parties
- Premier of Ontario
- Leader of the Opposition (Ontario)
