= Joseph Earngey =

Canadian politician

Ontario MPP
- In office 1926–1929
- Preceded by: Peter Heenan
- Succeeded by: Earl Hutchinson
- Constituency: Kenora

Personal details
- Born: Joseph Pattulo Earngey; February 9, 1872; Brampton, Ontario, Canada
- Died: May 26, 1939 (aged 67); Kenora, Ontario, Canada
- Political party: Conservative
- Occupation: Newspaper publisher

Joseph Pattulo Earngey (February 9, 1872 – May 26, 1939) was a Canadian newspaper publisher and politician. He served as mayor of the town of Kenora, Ontario from 1915 to 1918, and as a member of the Legislative Assembly of Ontario from 1926 to 1929.

== Background ==
Born and raised near Brampton, Ontario, Earngey learned the printing trade before moving to what was then known as Rat Portage, where he launched the Rat Portage Miner in 1897. He acquired the competing The News, merging the two publications into one under the name Rat Portage Miner and News in 1904, and renaming it to the Kenora Miner and News when the town was renamed. He owned the publication until his death in 1939, and it still operates today.

== Political career ==
Earngey served on Kenora's town council from 1911 to 1914, and as mayor from 1915 to 1918.

In 1922, he served as one of Ontario's representatives to the Canada-Ontario-Manitoba Tripartite Agreement committee regarding water management on the Lake of the Woods.

In 1926, he was selected as the Ontario Conservative Party's candidate for Kenora in the 1926 Ontario general election. He won the election, and served in the 17th Parliament of Ontario. In 1928, he was selected by premier Howard Ferguson to move the government's motion to accept the Speech from the Throne. In his speech, he applauded the government's decisions on the development of the English River corridor, and spoke in support of the expansion of rail service in Northern Ontario.

During the session, he introduced a bill to support the construction of a railway line from Kenora to the mining development site at Red Lake, but soon withdrew the bill for unspecified reasons. At the Conservative party convention in 1928, he spoke in support of the establishment of an educational scholarship for students in Canadian history.

During the final session of the 17th parliament, he opposed the construction of a railway line northerly from Goldpines, on the grounds that any new transportation lines into the Patricia District should be built directly from Kenora.

Earngey ran for reelection in the 1929 Ontario general election, but lost to Labour candidate Earl Hutchinson. The Conservative Party had some hope that votes for Earngey in Red Lake would overcome his loss in the town of Kenora itself, although the final certified results from Red Lake actually widened Hutchinson's margin of victory from 350 votes to 404. During Hutchinson's term in the legislature, he sued the Kenora Daily Miner and News for libel, with the suit settled out of court.
