= Liberal–Labour (Canada) =

Canadian political grouping

- Ideology: Labourism

The Liberal–Labour banner has been used several times by candidates in Canadian elections.

In the early twentieth century when the idea of trade unionists running for elected office under their own banner gained ground, several working class candidates on the provincial or federal level were elected on a Labour ticket. Once elected, in the absence of an organized Labour Party, an MP elected on a Labour ticket would often support, or join, the Liberal Party of Canada and would often be described as "Liberal–Labour"

At other times, the Liberal Party, particularly under William Lyon Mackenzie King would try to co-opt the trade union vote by running Liberal supporters as Labour or Liberal–Labour candidates. These would be official or unofficial "fusion" candidates who would run in the absence of a straight Liberal candidate.

- Ralph Smith was a miner who won election to the Legislative Assembly of British Columbia in 1898 on a Liberal–Labour platform. In the 1900 federal election he was elected to the House of Commons of Canada as a Liberal–Labour candidate, defeating the official Liberal candidate. He immediately joined the Liberal Party caucus of Sir Wilfrid Laurier and subsequently ran and won re-election as a straight Liberal against Conservative and Socialist opponents.
- Alphonse Verville was president of the Trades and Labour Congress of Canada when he was elected as a Labour candidate in a 1906 by-election in Maisonneuve. Verville was elected by defeating a Liberal opponent, however, in subsequent elections the Liberals ran no candidate in Maisonneuve and threw their support to Verville who would generally support Sir Wilfrid Laurier's Liberals in the House of Commons of Canada. In the 1917 federal election on conscription, Verville ran and was re-elected as a Laurier-Liberal.
- Malcolm Lang, who was elected as a Labour Party of Canada Member of Parliament in the 1926 federal election, failed to get re-elected as "Liberal–Labour" in the north-eastern Ontario riding of Timiskaming South in the 1930 federal election.
- Humphrey Mitchell was elected as a Labour MP in a 1931 by-election in Hamilton East. He was unopposed by the Mackenzie King Liberals and generally voted with the Liberal caucus while having a poor relationship with other Labour MPs in parliament. He refused to join the Co-operative Commonwealth Federation when it was formed the next year and, in the 1935 federal election ran for re-election as a Labour MP. The Liberals supported Mitchell unofficially and did not run a candidate against him. The CCF, however, did stand a candidate in Hamilton East resulting in the labour vote being split and Mitchell's defeat at the hands of a Conservative in a year where the Conservatives lost dozens of seats. Mitchell returned to parliament during World War II as a Liberal MP and cabinet minister.
- From 1949 to 1965, William Moore Benidickson represented the north-western Ontario riding of Kenora-Rainy River as a Liberal–Labour Member of Parliament. Benidickson was elected as a Liberal MP in the 1945 federal election, but ran subsequently as "Liberal–Labour" as the result of an informal electoral pact between the Labor-Progressive Party (i.e., the Communist Party of Canada) and the Liberal Party of Canada (see also Ontario legislature, below.)

Benidickson was succeeded in that riding by John Mercer Reid, who was elected as a "Liberal" in 1965 but then sat as a "Liberal–Labour" MP from the 1968 federal election until the 1972 federal election, when he changed his designation back to "Liberal". In the 1988 federal election, Liberal candidate Bob Nault identified himself as "Liberal–Labour" on some of his literature (particularly those distributed at plant gates) in his successful attempt to defeat NDP incumbent John Parry who had defeated Reid in 1984. Nault was officially listed as a straight Liberal on the ballot and in his official designation when he became an MP.

- In the 1935 federal election, three candidates ran in Quebec ridings, placing last in each case, and drawing no more than 1.5% of the vote in each case. In all three ridings, at least one other candidate ran as a "Liberal".
- In the 1945 federal election, one candidate ran as a "Liberal Labour" candidate in the Quebec riding of Mercier, placing last in a field of seven, with 345 votes, 1.0% of the total.
- In the 1949 federal election, one candidate ran as a "Liberal Labour" candidate in the Quebec riding of Stanstead, placing last in a field of four, with 433 votes, 2.6% of the total.

== Liberal Labour Party ==
The Liberal Labour Party name has been used twice in Canadian elections, though it may have been just a convenient label for those two candidates rather than an organized political party.

In the 1926 federal election, Alexander Jarvis McComber, a barrister, placed second in a field of three candidates in the north-western Ontario riding of Port Arthur – Thunder Bay, winning 2,990 votes, 26% of the total. No candidate ran as a "Liberal", but the third place candidate ran as a "Labour" candidate.

In a 22 March 1954 by-election in Verdun, Quebec, Hervé Ferland, an advertising agent, placed fifth in a field of seven candidates, which included one "Liberal" and two "Independent Liberals". He won 2,180 votes, 8.7% of the total.

== Liberal Labour Progressive ==
In the 1926 federal election, the only opponent of the victorious Conservative candidate in the Algoma West riding in northern Ontario ran as a Liberal Labour Progressive candidate. Albert Ernest Whytall won 4,187 votes, or 37% of the total.

== Ontario legislature ==
In the 1945 Ontario provincial election, the Communist Party (running as the Labor-Progressive Party) decided to run six candidates jointly with the Liberal Party of Ontario under Mitchell Hepburn. This was an attempt to marginalise the Ontario Co-operative Commonwealth Federation in elections to the Legislative Assembly of Ontario.

The United Auto Workers (UAW) participated in the effort and ran three Liberal–Labour candidates against CCF incumbents in Windsor including George Burt, Canadian director of the UAW, Alexander A. Parent, a Communist and president of UAW Local 195. Parent was elected in Essex North but Burt and Reaume were both defeated, though vote-splitting also resulted in the defeat of two CCF incumbents. Another unsuccessful "Liberal–Labour" candidate was Arthur Reaume, mayor of Windsor, who had been a long time Tory and had run for George Drew's Progressive Conservative Party of Ontario in 1943 provincial election, but broke with his party to support UAW workers at Ford in their fight for the Rand Formula. Reaume ran again as "Liberal–Labour" in the 1948 provincial election, without success, and was finally elected in the 1951 provincial election as a "Liberal".

The other two Liberal–Labour MPPs elected were James Newman of Rainy River and Joseph Meinzinger of Waterloo North, defeating CCF incumbents George Lockhart and John Henry Cook, respectively. Of the three, only Newman would be re-elected in the 1948 provincial election.

The decision by the Liberals, UAW members and Communists to collaborate was ironic given Hepburn's vociferous opposition to both Communism and the Congress of Industrial Organizations during his term as Premier of Ontario. Two pro-labour MPPs, David Croll and Arthur Roebuck, had resigned from Hepburn's cabinet in 1937 to protest his anti-labour actions during a UAW strike in Oshawa, Ontario. (George Burt was Treasurer of the UAW's Oshawa local at the time of the strike.)

The ridings of Kenora and Rainy River (separate ridings provincially, a single riding federally) continued to nominate "Liberal–Labour" candidates to both the Ontario legislature and the House of Commons of Canada for decades.

Kenora had previously elected Peter Heenan as a Labour representative in the 1919 election. Heenan remained one of only four Labour MLAs (as MPPs were still known) re-elected in the 1923 election and was defeated in the 1926 election. He then entered federal politics becoming a federal Liberal and joining William Lyon Mackenzie King's Cabinet as Minister of Labour. In 1929 Earl Hutchinson recaptured Kenora as a Labour MLA. He was re-elected in 1934 but was persuaded to resign a few weeks later in order to allow Heenan to run in the subsequent by-election, this time as a Liberal. Heenan was elected and joined Mitchell Hepburn's Cabinet serving as Minister of Mines and Forests (1934–1941) and Minister of Labour (1941–1943) while Hutchinson was appointed vice-chairman of the Workmen's Compensation Board weeks after his resignation. Heenan was later defeated by William Docker of the Co-operative Commonwealth Federation in the 1943 provincial election in which the Liberals were reduced to third party status. Subsequently, the Liberals ran Albert Wren as a "Liberal–Labour" candidate unsuccessfully in the 1948 election before his victory in the 1951 election.

- Albert Wren of Kenora was the longest serving "Liberal–Labour" MPP, sitting in the Ontario legislature from 1951 until his death in 1961. He ran for the leadership of the Ontario Liberal Party in 1954, coming in second, and again in 1958, coming in last. Robert Gibson succeeded Wren as the "Liberal–Labour" MPP for Kenora and served until just prior to the 1967 provincial election.
- T. Patrick Reid was elected "Liberal–Labour" MPP for the neighbouring riding of Rainy River in the 1967 provincial election He ran as a "Liberal" in the 1971 provincial election, and 1975 provincial election. He reverted to the "Liberal–Labour" label for the 1977 provincial election, and returned to being a "Liberal" MPP in 1981 provincial election, and left politics in 1984.

More recently, Liberals in Kenora such as former Member of Parliament Bob Nault have occasionally used the "Liberal–Labour" tag on some of their campaign literature (such as that handed out at plant gates) though they are listed as straight Liberals on the ballot.

== See also ==
- Labour candidates and parties in Canada
- List of Labour MPs (Canada)
- List of Canadian political parties
- Parliament of Canada History of the Federal Electoral Ridings since 1867
