= Kenora Miner and News =

Canadian newspaper in Ontario

- Type: Weekly newspaper
- Format: Tabloid
- Owner: The Klein Group
- Editor: Ryan Stelter
- Founded: 1881
- Language: English
- Headquarters: 33 Main St. P.O. Box 1620, Kenora, Ontario, P9N 3X7
- ISSN: 0839-4989
- Website: kenoraminerandnews.com

The Kenora Miner and News is a weekly publication based in Kenora, Ontario. The Miner and News is delivered free throughout the region every Thursday. The Miner and News is owned by The Klein Group.

The paper was formerly known as the Kenora Daily Miner and News. In April 2019 the Miner ceased publishing on Tuesdays, prompting the removal of the word "Daily" from its name.

In January 2020, the Miner moved to a weekly publishing scheduling, amalgamating with the Lake of the Woods Enterprise.

In 2024, Postmedia announced the sale of the newspaper to the Klein Group, a Manitoba-based company owned by Kevin Klein.

== History ==
The current Miner and News has been in continuous publication under various names as a weekly, semi-weekly and daily since 1880. James Weidman, one of western Canada's pioneering newspaper men, came to Rat Portage in the summer of 1880 and began publication of the Rat Progress Progress as a daily newspaper that September. Weidman sold his publication in 1882 and it went through several changes of ownership until being bought by John McCrossan who changed the newspaper's name to "The News" in 1887. Weidman returned to Rat Portage in the summer of 1891 and began a new publication that July 'The Weekly Record', a short time later moving to semi-weekly publication. In 1897 Weidman sold his Rat Portage paper to Joseph Earngey and a group of local investors. Earngey changed the paper's name to the Rat Portage Miner. Earngey and his partners acquired 'The News', in 1902 from the family of Edward Chapman who was its owner from 1895 until his death in 1902. The two publications were merged, the daily News edition dropped, and the name changed to the Rat Portage Miner and News with twice-weekly publication. Following the town's name change in 1905, the paper was renamed the Kenora Miner and News in March 1906. Earngey would be the majority owner and manager/editor of the newspaper until his death in 1939. The newspaper again went through several ownership changes until being acquired by Stuart King in 1952 who moved the newspaper to six-day a week publication, in 1960 he also acquired the competing Daily Reminder. In November 1973, Bowes Publishers purchased the newspaper and the name of the paper was changed again in 1977 to the Daily Miner and News. The Kenora Enterprise, which began publishing in 1996, was brought into the Daily Miner and News fold in July 2003.

In 2020, the Miner won its first-ever National Newspaper Award. Editor Ryan Stelter won the Claude Ryan Award for editorial writing.

On May 27, 2024, Postmedia announced it would sell the Kenora Miner and News to Kevin Klein.

== See also ==
- List of newspapers in Canada
