= Leo Bernier =

Canadian politician (1928–2010)

Ontario MPP
- In office 1966–1987
- Preceded by: Robert Gibson
- Succeeded by: Frank Miclash
- Constituency: Kenora

Personal details
- Born: August 12, 1928 Sioux Lookout, Ontario
- Died: June 28, 2010 (aged 81) Sioux Lookout, Ontario
- Party: Progressive Conservative
- Spouse: Marjorie Bernier
- Children: 4
- Occupation: Businessman

Leo Edward Bernier (August 12, 1928 – June 28, 2010) was a politician in Ontario, Canada. He served in the Legislative Assembly of Ontario from 1966 to 1987, and was a cabinet minister in the governments of Bill Davis and Frank Miller. Bernier was a member of the Progressive Conservative Party. Bernier presided over a time in Northern Ontario when the economy was booming. He was also a personable and well-liked MPP who looked out for his constituents. He was known by his nickname as "Emperor of the North".

== Background ==
Bernier was born in Sioux Lookout, Ontario, and educated in the area. He worked as a bush pilot and became the general manager of Bernier & Sons Contractors, and served as president of the local Chamber of Commerce. He was an honorary member of the Royal Canadian Legion and the Knights of Columbus.

== Politics ==
He ran for the Ontario legislature in the 1963 provincial election, and lost to Liberal-Labour candidate Robert Gibson by 840 votes in Kenora. Gibson died in 1966, and Bernier was elected in a by-election to replace him. He was returned by an increased margin in the 1967 provincial election, and served as a backbench supporter of the John Robarts administration. When Bill Davis succeeded Roberts as premier on March 1, 1971, he appointed Bernier as his Minister of Mines and Northern Affairs.

Bernier was easily re-elected in the 1971 provincial election. He was given additional responsibilities as Minister of Lands and Forests on February 2, 1972. On April 7 of the same year, his portfolios were restructured as the Ministry of Natural Resources.

Bernier was re-elected without serious opposition in the elections of 1975, 1977, 1981, and 1985. He was named Minister of Northern Affairs on February 3, 1977, and held this position for more than eight years. Bernier was the most powerful minister for Northern Ontario in the Bill Davis government, and was sometimes called the "Emperor of the North". Like most Progressive Conservatives of his time, he supported government intervention in economic matters.

Bernier initially supported Dennis Timbrell in the Progressive Conservative Party's January 1985 leadership convention, but crossed to Frank Miller after Timbrell was eliminated. Miller retained him in the Northern Affairs portfolio after becoming Premier of Ontario on February 8, 1985. The Progressive Conservatives under Miller were reduced to a tenuous minority government in the 1985 election, and were defeated in the house in June 1985. In opposition, Bernier served as his party's critic for Natural Resources and Northern Affairs and Mines. He did not run for re-election in 1987.

In 1975, Bernier selected amethyst as Ontario's mineral emblem.

=== Cabinet positions ===
Davis ministry, Province of Ontario (1971–1985)
Cabinet posts (2)
Predecessor	Office	Successor
René Brunelle	Minister of Natural Resources (Note: Bernier was also Minister of Lands and Forests from February 2, 1972 to April 7, 1972 when it was merged into Natural Resources.); 1972–1977	Frank Miller
Allan Lawrence	Minister of Mines and Northern Affairs (Note: On February 3, 1977, responsibility was changed to Minister of Northern Affairs which remained until June 1985.) (Note: Bernier was retained as Minister of Northern Affairs by Frank Miller in both of his cabinets from February to June, 1985.); 1971–1985	René Fontaine

== Later life ==
He served as chair of the Boreal West Round Table in the 1990s, and remained active in the Ontario Progressive Conservative Party until his death. In 2004, he supported John Tory's successful bid to become party leader.

Bernier died on June 28, 2010, in Sioux Lookout hospital at the age of 81. In 2012, Highway 664 was renamed in his honour.
