= Harold Machin =

American-Canadian lawyer (1875–1931)

Ontario MPP
- In office 1908–1919
- Preceded by: New riding
- Succeeded by: Peter Heenan
- Constituency: Kenora

Personal details
- Born: May 9, 1875 Rochester, New York
- Died: October 13, 1931 (aged 56) Kenora, Ontario
- Party: Conservative
- Spouse: Ida F. Knight (m. 1902)
- Children: 2
- Occupation: Lawyer

Military service
- Allegiance: Canadian
- Branch/service: Royal Canadian Artillery
- Years of service: 1901-1902,1914-1918
- Rank: Colonel
- Unit: 94th Battalion
- Battles/wars: Boer War, World War I

Harold Arthur Clement Machin (May 9, 1875 – October 13, 1931) was an Ontario lawyer and political figure. He represented Kenora in the Legislative Assembly of Ontario as a Conservative member from 1908 to 1919. He was also a Ku Klux Klan organizer who attempted to start a chapter in Winnipeg, but was unsuccessful.

He was born in Rochester, New York, the son of Reverend Canon C.J. Machin who was born in England and grew up in St. John's, Newfoundland and Port Arthur, Ontario. Machin was educated in England and then studied law at Osgoode Hall. After being called to the bar, he set up practice in Rat Portage in 1898. He served in a Canadian contingent in South Africa during the Second Boer War and then served in the South African constabulary before returning to Canada in 1904. For a time after his return to Canada, Machin prospected for minerals in northern Quebec. He served overseas with a Canadian labour battalion and with the British Army during World War I. In 1918, he became director of the Military Services branch of the Canadian Department of Justice.

He was a fierce opponent of Conservative premier William Howard Hearst's Ontario Temperance Act and became a prominent member of the Citizen's Liberty League formed in 1919 to oppose prohibition in Ontario. After quitting the Conservative Party, he ran as an independent in the 1919 Ontario election, but was defeated by labour candidate Peter Heenan.

Machin married at the English church Kalk Bay, Cape Colony on 11 December 1902 Ida Florence Knight, daughter of William Knight, of Horner Grange, Sydenham.

The township of Machin in Kenora District was named in his honour.
