= James George White =

Canadian politician from Ontario

Member of the Ontario Provincial Parliament for Kenora
- In office June 7, 1948 – October 6, 1951
- Preceded by: William Manson Docker
- Succeeded by: Albert Wren

Personal details
- Party: Progressive Conservative

James George White was a Canadian politician who was Progressive Conservative MPP for Kenora from 1948 to 1951.

== See also ==
- 23rd Parliament of Ontario
