= Frank Miclash =

Canadian politician

Ontario MPP
- In office 1987–1999
- Preceded by: Leo Bernier
- Succeeded by: riding dissolved
- Constituency: Kenora

Personal details
- Born: May 16, 1953 (age 73) Kenora, Ontario
- Party: Liberal
- Occupation: Teacher, hospital administrator

Frank Ranover Miclash (born May 16, 1953) is a former politician in Ontario, Canada. He served as a Liberal member of the Legislative Assembly of Ontario from 1987 to 1999.

== Background ==
Miclash was educated at the University of Manitoba, receiving a certificate in education, and later worked as a teacher. He was elected to the Lake of the Woods District Hospital board in 1985, and served as a commanding officer of the Navy League Cadet Corps. He owns a fishing camp and a bed-and-breakfast inn.

== Politics ==
He was elected to the Ontario legislature in the 1987 provincial election, defeating New Democrat Doug Miranda by just over 1,000 votes in the riding of Kenora. The Liberal Party won a landslide majority in this election. Miclash was appointed as a parliamentary assistant in 1988–89.

In the 1990 election the Liberals were defeated by New Democratic Party, although Miclash defeated Miranda a second time by 331. Miclash served as chief opposition whip in 1991–92, and was easily re-elected in the 1995 election. He supported Dwight Duncan for the Liberal Party leadership in 1996.

The province's electoral boundaries were radically altered in 1996, such that Miclash's Kenora riding was merged with the Rainy River of NDP leader Howard Hampton as Kenora—Rainy River. As such, the two MPPs were forced to face each other in the 1999 provincial election. Despite retaining strong support in the Kenora area, Miclash was unable to match Hampton's name recognition; Hampton won the election by just over 3,000 votes.

== Later life ==
Miclash worked for three months as a manual labourer on the Grace Anne luxury yacht following his defeat. He was subsequently appointed to the province's social benefits tribunal by the Progressive Conservative government of Mike Harris and he continues to serve on that body.

== Electoral record ==
1995 Ontario general election: Kenora
| Party | Candidate | Votes | % | ±% | Expenditures |
|---|---|---|---|---|---|
| Liberal | Frank Miclash | 9,152 | 53.72 | – | $43,182 |
| Progressive Conservative | Gord Griffiths | 5,097 | 29.92 | | $17,217 |
| New Democratic | Mike Clancy | 2,788 | 16.36 | | $13,143 |
| Total valid votes | | 17,037 | 100.00 | | |
| Rejected, unmarked and declined ballots | | 160 | | | |
| Turnout | | 17,197 | 52.02 | | |
| Electors on the lists | | 33,061 | | | |

Sources: Ontario Election Results with Statistics from the Records (1995) and 1997 and prior returns and summaries, Elections Ontario.
