= Earl Hutchinson =

Canadian politician

Ontario MPP
- In office 1929–1934
- Preceded by: Joseph Earngey
- Succeeded by: Peter Heenan
- Constituency: Kenora

Personal details
- Born: October 23, 1888 Port Burwell, Ontario
- Died: August 17, 1976 (aged 87) Woodstock, Ontario
- Party: Labour
- Spouse: Julia Ellen Huckabone (m. 1917; died 1958)
- Occupation: Railroad engineer

Earl Hutchinson (October 23, 1888 – August 17, 1976) was a railroad engineer and political figure from Ontario, Canada. He represented Kenora in the Legislative Assembly of Ontario as a Labour member from 1929 to 1934. He was re-elected as a "Liberal-Labour" candidate in the 1934 provincial election that brought the Liberals under Mitch Hepburn to power. Hutchinson was persuaded to resign his seat in order to allow Peter Heenan to contest the riding in a by-election as Hepburn wanted to appoint him to cabinet. As his reward, Hutchinson was appointed vice-chairman of the Workmen's Compensation Board by Hepburn in October 1934.

He was born in Port Burwell, Ontario and educated in St. Thomas. In 1917, he married Julia Ellen Huckabone. He was a member of the Kenora town council and was mayor from 1928 to 1929. He died in Woodstock, Ontario in 1976.

Hutchinson was the last Labour member to be elected to the Ontario legislature.
