= Robert Gibson (Ontario politician) =

Canadian politician

Robert Wayne Gibson
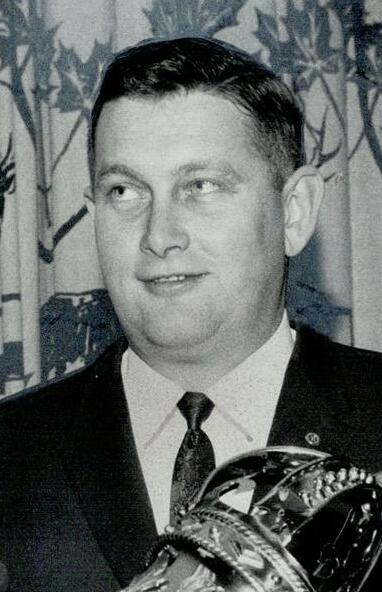

Ontario MPP
- In office 1962–1966
- Preceded by: Albert Wren
- Succeeded by: Leo Bernier
- Constituency: Kenora

Personal details
- Born: November 14, 1932 Kenora, Ontario, Canada
- Died: March 26, 1966 (aged 33) Toronto, Ontario, Canada
- Party: Liberal, 1962-1963; Liberal-Labour, 1963-1966
- Spouse: Marjorie
- Occupation: Lawyer

Robert Wayne Gibson (November 14, 1932 – March 26, 1966) was a politician in Ontario, Canada. He was a Liberal member of the Legislative Assembly of Ontario from 1962 to 1963 who represented the northwestern riding of Kenora. From 1963 to 1966 he sat as a Liberal-Labour member. He died in office after a short illness from an infection of the pancreas.

== Background ==
He was born in Kenora in 1932. He spent his education at Queen's University in Kingston, Ontario, and later went to Osgoode Hall in Toronto. He returned to Kenora where he worked as a lawyer.

== Offices ==
Gibson ran as a Liberal candidate in the northern Ontario riding of Kenora which was called after the death of long-serving Liberal-Labour member Albert Wren. He defeated Progressive Conservative opponent Peter Robertson by 1,178 votes. As a means of marginalizing the NDP candidate, in the 1963 general election, Gibson ran as a Liberal-Labour candidate and defeated the PC candidate, Leo Bernier, by 840 votes. He served as an opposition member facing Progressive Conservative governments under Premier John Robarts.

Gibson was interested in native affairs and flew to several remote reserves to observe living conditions. He died on March 26, 1966, of a pancreas infection.
