= William Manson Docker =

Canadian politician

Ontario MPP
- In office 1943–1948
- Preceded by: Peter Heenan
- Succeeded by: James George White
- Constituency: Kenora

Personal details
- Born: January 31, 1891 Govan, Scotland
- Died: 1971-06 (aged 73–74)
- Party: CCF
- Spouse: Alma Tidman (m. 1938)
- Occupation: Businessman

William Manson Docker (January 31, 1891 – June 1971) was a Scottish-born businessman and politician in Ontario, Canada. He represented Kenora in the Legislative Assembly of Ontario from 1943 to 1948 as a Co-operative Commonwealth Federation (CCF) member.

The son of William Docker and Annie Manson, he was born in Govan and was educated in Scotland. Docker came to Canada in 1934. In 1938, he married Alma Tidman. He was the manager of a dry goods store.
