= Albert Wren =

Canadian politician (1916–1961)

Ontario MPP
- In office 1951–1961
- Preceded by: James George White
- Succeeded by: Robert Gibson
- Constituency: Kenora

Personal details
- Born: December 9, 1916 Fort William, Ontario, Canada
- Died: November 1, 1961 (aged 44) Sioux Lookout, Ontario, Canada
- Party: Liberal-Labour
- Spouse: Mary
- Children: 2
- Occupation: Civil servant

Military service
- Allegiance: Canadian
- Branch/service: Royal Canadian Air Force
- Years of service: 1940-1945

Albert Wren (December 9, 1916 – November 1, 1961) was a politician in Ontario, Canada. He was a Liberal-Labour member of the Legislative Assembly of Ontario from 1951 to 1961 for the northwestern Ontario riding of Kenora.

== Background ==
He was born in Fort William, Ontario, but his family soon moved to the town of Ignace, a small railway community. He enlisted in the Royal Canadian Air Force and served overseas as an officer during World War II. After the war he worked as the town clerk in Sioux Lookout until he was elected as an MPP. He and his wife Mary raised two daughters.

== Politics ==
Wren ran as a Liberal-Labour candidate in 1948 provincial election but was defeated by the Progressive Conservative candidate James George White by 957 votes. He ran again in 1951, this time defeating his PC opponent by 88 votes.

Wren sat with the Liberal caucus and ran twice in Ontario Liberal Party leadership conventions. He placed second at the 1954 convention with 162 votes when he lost to Farquhar Oliver (a former United Farmers of Ontario MPP). At the 1957 party convention, Wren and fellow MPP Arthur Reaume were expelled from the Liberal caucus for attacking Oliver's leadership and demanding a new leadership convention. Oliver subsequently resigned and a new leadership vote was held in 1958. Wren ran, placing last with only seven votes on the first ballot and then threw his support to John Wintermeyer who ultimately came from behind to win the convention.

Wren served as his party's Labour Critic. He died in office in 1961.
