= Peter Heenan =

Canadian politician

The Honourable Peter Heenan PC
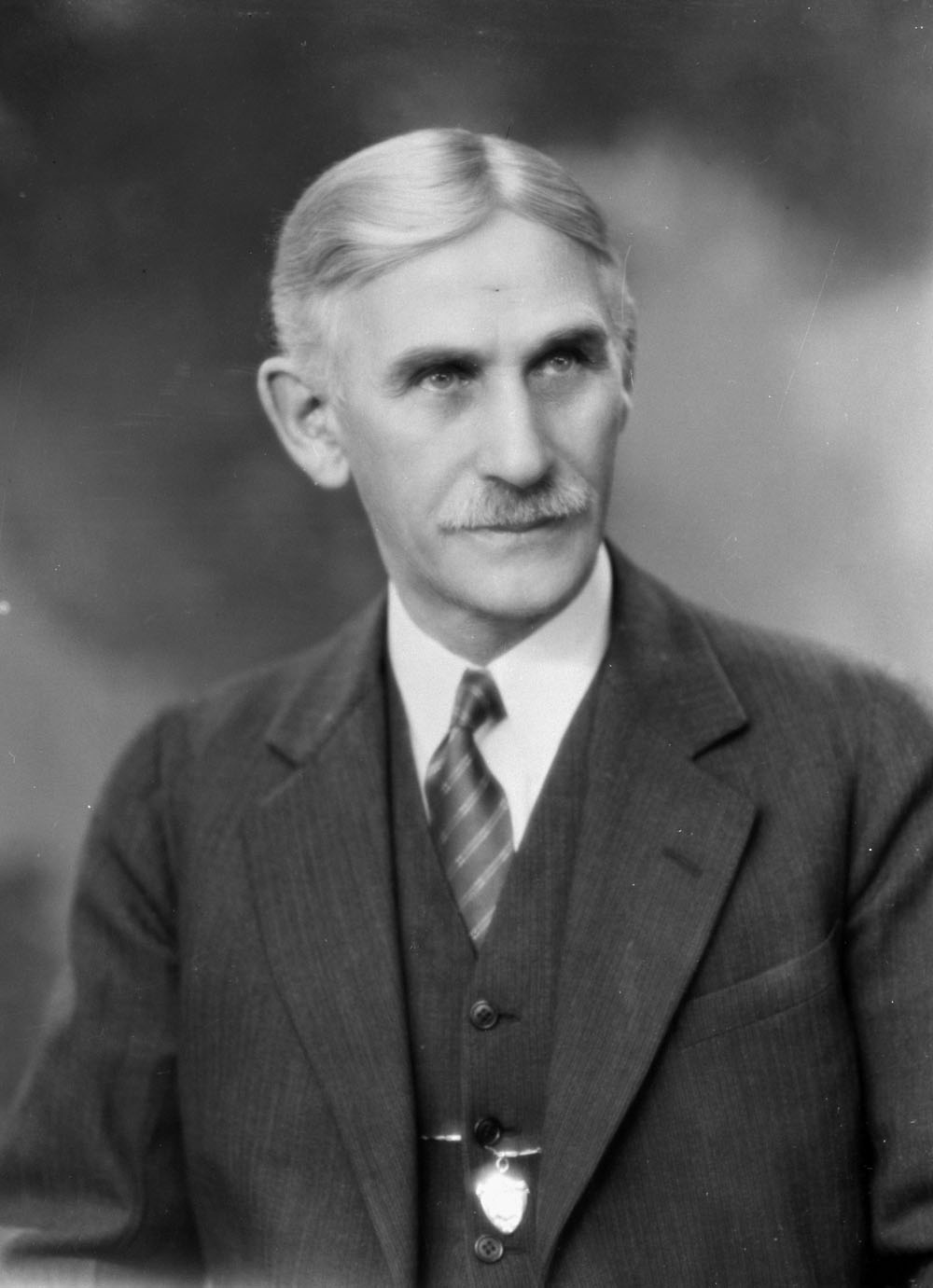

MPP for Kenora
- In office October 20, 1919 – October 18, 1926
- Preceded by: Harold Machin
- Succeeded by: Joseph Earngey

Member of Parliament for Kenora—Rainy River
- In office October 29, 1925 – July 3, 1934
- Preceded by: New riding
- Succeeded by: Hugh Bathgate McKinnon

MPP for Kenora
- In office August 7, 1934 – June 30, 1943
- Preceded by: Earl Hutchinson
- Succeeded by: William Manson Docker

Minister of Labour for Canada
- In office September 25, 1926 – August 7, 1930
- Preceded by: George Burpee Jones
- Succeeded by: Gideon Decker Robertson

Minister of Lands and Forests for Ontario
- In office July 10, 1934 – May 27, 1941
- Preceded by: William Finlayson
- Succeeded by: Norman Otto Hipel

Minister of Labour for Ontario
- In office June 14, 1938 – September 2, 1938
- Preceded by: Morrison Mann MacBride
- Succeeded by: Norman Otto Hipel

Minister of Labour for Ontario
- In office May 27, 1941 – August 17, 1943
- Preceded by: Norman Otto Hipel
- Succeeded by: Charles Daley

Personal details
- Born: February 19, 1875 Tullaree, near Newcastle, County Down, Ireland
- Died: May 12, 1948 (aged 73) Toronto, Ontario, Canada
- Party: Labour Party of Canada (to 1926); Liberal Party of Canada; Ontario Liberal Party
- Spouse: Annie Fawcett
- Profession: Coal miner, diver, locomotive engineer, union leader

Peter Heenan, PC (February 19, 1875 – May 12, 1948) was a Canadian union leader and politician, and also served as a cabinet minister at the federal and provincial levels.

== Early life ==
Born in Tullaree, near Newcastle, County Down, Ireland, Heenan worked as a pit boy at St Helen's Colliery in Cumberland, where he tested work on the mine's railways, and then worked on the Costa Rica Railway in Central America. An attack of yellow fever forced Heenan to move to Canada in 1902, where he first worked on a Western ranch, and then as a locomotive engineer for the Canadian Pacific Railway on the run between Winnipeg and Kenora. The experience he had acquired in Costa Rica as a diver also proved useful when he was called to help out in a train wreck just outside Kenora, where the locomotive had plunged down underwater.

Heenan became involved in the labour movement in Northwestern Ontario, becoming its most prominent leader by the beginning of World War I. He also became an alderman on Kenora's town council, serving for five years, and was also chairman of the local public utilities commission for two years.

== Political career ==
=== Labour MPP in Ontario (1919-1926) ===
Elected to the Legislative Assembly of Ontario as the Labour candidate for the riding of Kenora in the 1919 election, Heenan was re-elected in 1923. When the Legislature was not in session, he would resume driving locomotives.

Under Heenan's leadership, the Labour MPPs joined with the United Farmers of Ontario to form a coalition government under E.C. Drury, with the understanding that Drury would support Edward Wellington Backus' plans for erecting a newsprint mill in Kenora. Heenan was also instrumental in getting Harry Mills appointed as the Province's first Minister of Mines.

=== Liberal MP and federal Minister of Labour (1926-1934) ===
He was elected as the Liberal candidate to the House of Commons of Canada representing the riding of Kenora—Rainy River in the 1925 federal election. He was re-elected in 1926 and 1930. From 1926 to 1930, he was the Minister of Labour, and became known as "Peter the Peacemaker" for settling 160 labour disputes in his first three years. He secured the passage of the Mother's Allowance Act and the Old Age Pensions Act.

Heenan still found time to work as a locomotive engineer when the House was not in session. In 1934, during a debate, he exclaimed, "I wanted to be unique. I wanted to be the only man that the Conservatives have put into overalls."

=== Liberal MPP and Ontario Cabinet Minister (1934-1943) ===
Heenan resigned his federal seat, after winning a provincial seat as the Liberal Party of Ontario candidate in the 1934 election for the riding of Kenora. He was re-elected in 1937. From 1934 to 1941, he was the Minister of Lands and Forests in the provincial government of Mitchell Hepburn. Heenan was charged with promoting Hepburn's policies on natural resource development, including the aggressive position with respect to timber licenses in Northern Ontario that were being held by companies that would not (or could not) cut wood on them. In that regard, in 1936 the Forest Resources Regulation Act was passed that granted the government broad powers for mandating minimum production quotas, maximum limits in line with good forestry practice, reducing licensed acreages where they were in excess of requirements, and increasing stumpage fees on companies "operating or carrying on business in a manner detrimental to the public interest." Great Lakes Paper saw its holdings reduced from 23,085 square kilometres (5,704,000 acres) to 3,668 square kilometres (906,000 acres), and was assessed a $500,000 penalty ($11,100,000 in current terms) for refusing to participate in a minimum price agreement set up by the Ontario and Quebec governments.

He also sought to exploit other uses for provincial lands. In 1941, he announced that one-seventh of all Crown land, amounting to 2,000,000 acres (8,100 km^{2}), was being made available for lease to individuals, sportsmen's clubs and commercial camp owners.

The 1938 collapse of the Lake Sulphite Pulp Company's operation at Red Rock led to Opposition charges of ineptness in the policies of the Department of Lands and Forests. Following hearings by a legislative committee in the matter, Heenan and his deputy minister tendered their resignations. He was subsequently appointed as provincial Minister of Labour.

Heenan took good care of his constituents' interests, and arranged for many improvements for Northwestern Ontario, including the construction of the Heenan Highway (now Highway 71) to serve Kenora and Rainy River.
