= 1948 Ontario general election =

Canadian provincial election

- June 7, 1948

90 seats in the 23rd Legislative Assembly of Ontario 46 seats were needed for a majority
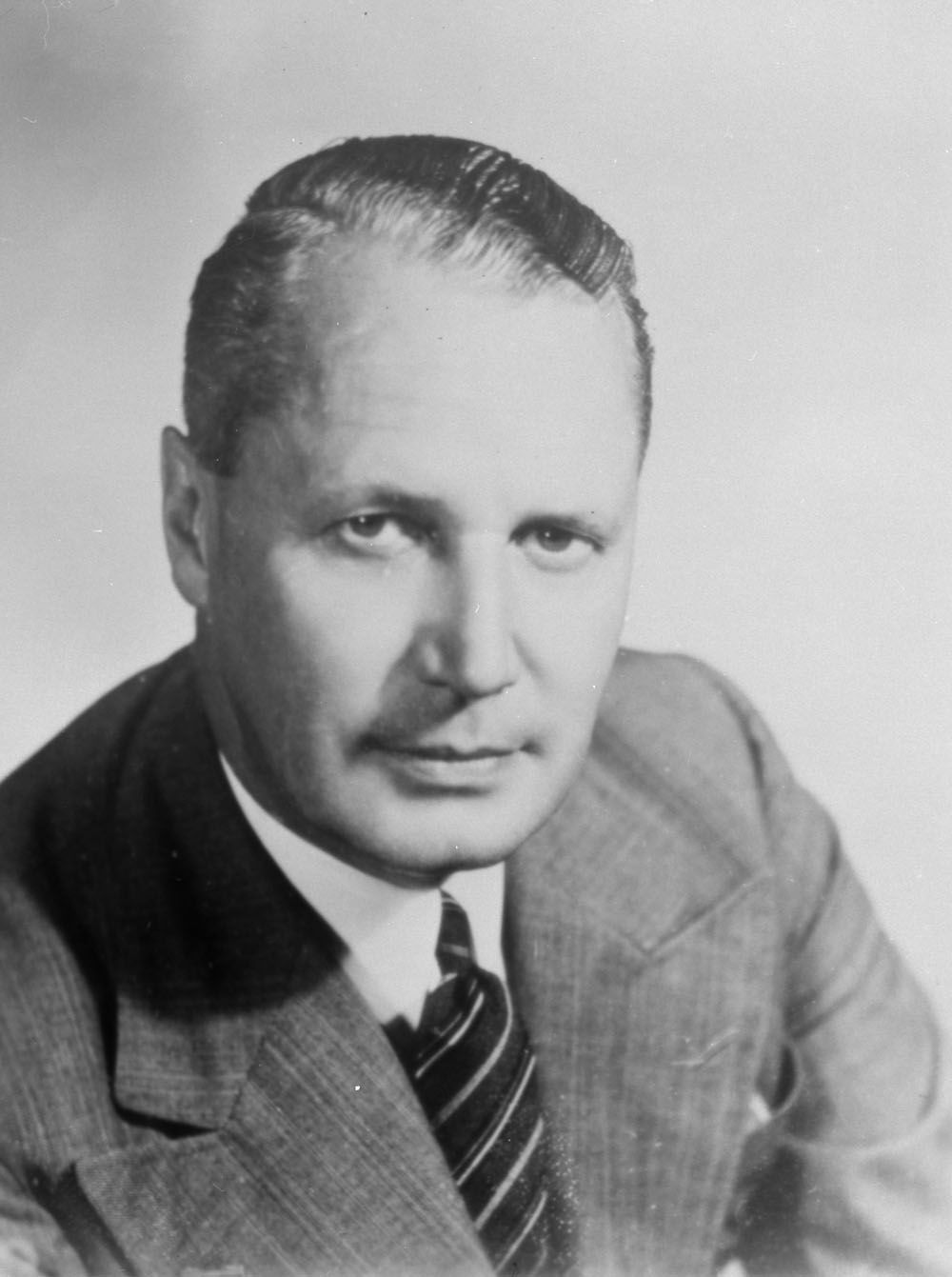

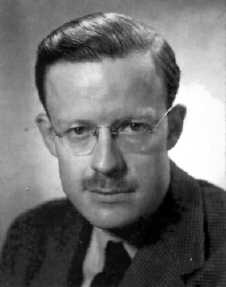

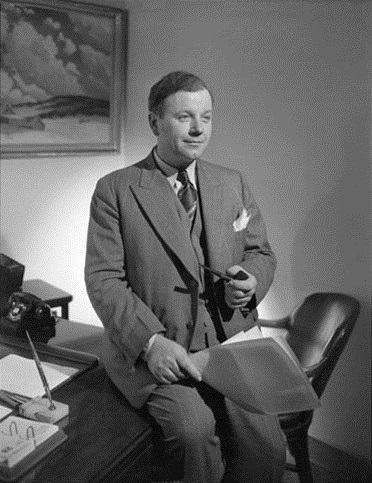
	First party	Second party
Leader	George Drew	Ted Jolliffe
Party	Progressive Conservative	Co-operative Commonwealth
Leader since	December 9, 1938	April 3, 1942
Leader's seat	High Park (lost re-election)	York South
Last election	66	8
Seats won	53	21
Seat change	▼13	▲13
Percentage	41.28%	26.52%
Swing	▼2.97pp	▲4.11pp
	Third party	Fourth party
		LP
Leader	Farquhar Oliver	A. A. MacLeod
Party	Liberal	Labor-Progressive
Leader since	May 16, 1947	1945
Leader's seat	Grey South	Bellwoods
Last election	14	2
Seats won	14	2
Seat change	–	–
Percentage	29.78%	1.00%
Swing	▲0.66pp	▼1.63pp
Premier before election
George Drew
Progressive Conservative
Premier after election
George Drew (Note: While Drew legally continued to be Premier until he assumed leadership of the federal Progressive Conservatives in October 1948, Thomas Laird Kennedy acted as interim Premier until the election of Leslie Frost in May 1949.)
Progressive Conservative

The 1948 Ontario general election was held on June 7, 1948, to elect the 90 members of the 23rd Legislative Assembly of Ontario (Members of Provincial Parliament, or "MPPs") of the province of Ontario.

The Ontario Progressive Conservative Party, led by George Drew, won a third consecutive term in office, winning a solid majority of seats in the legislature—53, down from 66 in the previous election. Drew unexpectedly lost his seat, and thereafter announced that rather than return to the legislature, he would seek the leadership of the federal Progressive Conservative Party of Canada.

== Campaign ==
The majority of races were three-way contests:

Riding contests, by number of candidates (1948)
Candidates	PC	CCF	Lib	L-L	Lab-Pr	UE/SC	S-L	I-PC	I-CCF	I-Lab	Ind	Total
2	7		6	1								14
3	61	59	60	1		1		1				183
4	18	18	18		2	11	3	2				72
5	4	4	4			3	2		1	1	1	20
Total	90	81	88	2	2	15	5	3	1	1	1	289

== Opinion Polls ==
Evolution of voting intentions at national level
Polling firm	Last day of survey	Source	PCO	OCCF	OLP	LPP	Other	ME	Sample
Election 1948	June 7, 1948		41.28	26.52	29.78	1.00	1.42		
Gallup	September 1947		44	18	35	1	2	—N/a	—N/a
Election 1945	June 4, 1945		44.3	22.4	29.8	2.4	1.1		

== Outcome ==
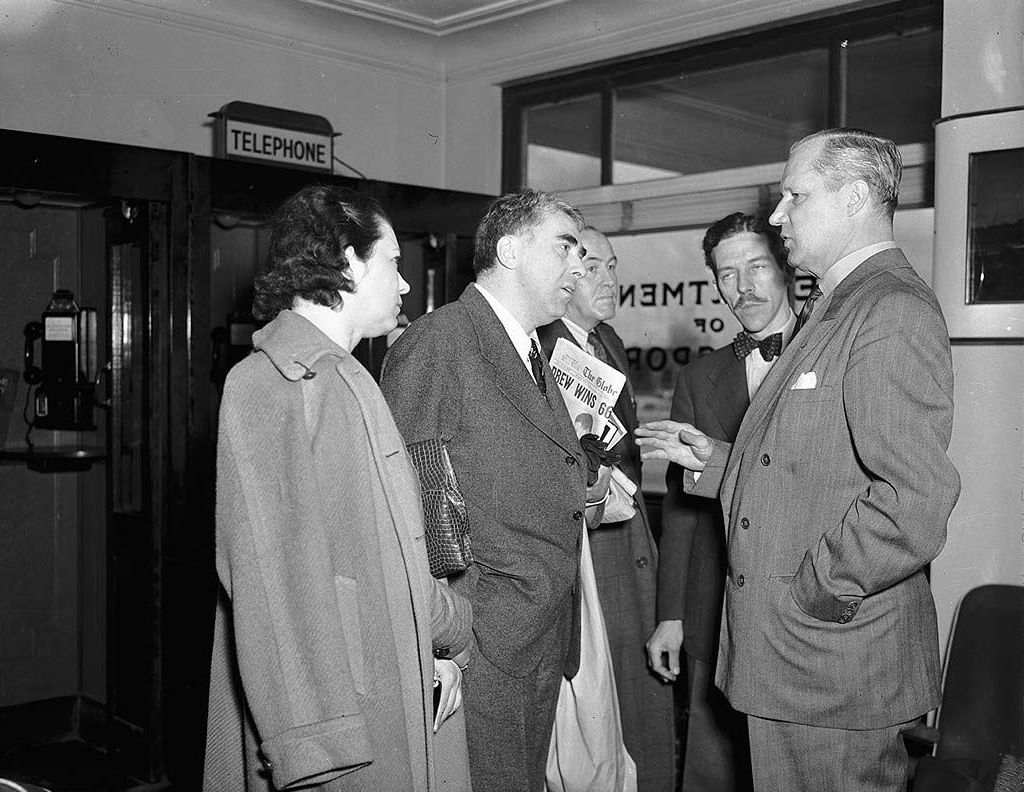
George Drew (right) in the offices of the Ontario Department of Transportation the day after his party's election victory

Despite winning a majority, Drew lost his own seat to temperance crusader Bill Temple. Instead of seeking a seat in a by-election, Drew left provincial politics to run for, and win, the leadership of the federal Progressive Conservative Party.

Drew was replaced as Ontario PC leader and premier by Thomas Kennedy on an interim basis, and then by Leslie Frost.

The Ontario Liberal Party, led by Farquhar Oliver, increased its caucus from 11 to 14, but lost the role of official opposition. Only one of the three Liberal-Labour MPPs sitting with the Liberal caucus, James Newman, was re-elected.

The social democratic Co-operative Commonwealth Federation (Ontario Section), led by Ted Jolliffe, formed the official opposition by increasing its caucus from 8 to 21 seats.

Two Toronto seats were won by Labor-Progressive Party MPPs J. B. Salsberg and A.A. MacLeod. The LPP was the official name of the Communist Party of Ontario. The LPP only ran two candidates, Salsberg and MacLeod, in 1948 down from 31 candidates in 1945.

== Results ==
Elections to the 23rd Parliament of Ontario (1948)
Political party	Party leader	MPPs					Votes		
Political party	Party leader	Candidates	1945	Dissol.	1948	±	#	%	± (pp)
Progressive Conservative	George Drew	90	66	66	53	13▼	725,799	41.28%	2.97▼
Co-operative Commonwealth	Ted Jolliffe	81	8	8	21	13▲	466,274	26.52%	4.11▲
Liberal	Farquhar Oliver	88	11	11	13	Steady	515,795	29.34%	0.66▲
Liberal–Labour		2	3	3	1	Steady	7,682	0.44%	0.66▲
Labor–Progressive	A.A. MacLeod	2	2	2	2	Steady	17,654	1.00%	1.63▼
Union of Electors	Ron Gostick	13	–	–	–	–	9,214	0.52%	0.51▲
Social Credit		2	–	–	–	–	734	0.04%	0.51▲
Independent-CCF		1	–	–	–		8,613	0.49%	New
Independent PC		3	–	–	–		3,340	0.19%	0.17▲
Independent		1	–	–	–		1,766	0.10%	0.30▼
Socialist Labor		5	–	–	–		913	0.05%	–
Independent Labour		1	–	–	–		253	0.01%	0.60▼
Vacant									
Total		289	90	90	90		1,758,037	100.00%	
Blank and invalid ballots							16,935		
Registered voters / turnout							2,623,281	67.66%	5.12▼

=== Vote and seat summaries ===
Ternary plots - shift of electoral support (1945-1948)
1945

1948
Electoral districts identified by colours of winning parties

Seats and popular vote by party
Party	Seats	Votes	Change (pp)
█ Progressive Conservative	53 / 90	41.28%	-2.97
█ Co-operative Commonwealth	21 / 90	26.52%	4.11
█ Liberal	13 / 90	29.34%	2.44
█ Labor–Progressive	2 / 90	1.00%	-1.44
█ Liberal–Labour	1 / 90	0.44%	-1.89
█ Other	0 / 90	1.42%	-0.25

=== Synopsis of results ===
Results by riding - 1948 Ontario general election
Riding	Winning party						Turnout (Note: including spoilt ballots)	Votes										
Name (Note: order is as given in EO reports)	1945	Party	Votes	Share	Margin #	Margin %	Turnout	PC	Lib/LL	CCF	Lab-Pr	I-CCF	I-PC	I-Lab	Ind	UE/SC	S-Lab	Total
Addington	PC	PC	6,497	53.05%	1,891	15.44%	70.02%	6,497	4,606	1,143	–	–	–	–	–	–	–	12,246
Algoma—Manitoulin	PC	PC	4,907	37.93%	751	5.81%	74.89%	4,907	4,156	3,873	–	–	–	–	–	–	–	12,936
Brant	Lib	Lib	9,557	65.56%	4,537	31.12%	63.78%	5,020	9,557	–	–	–	–	–	–	–	–	14,577
Brantford	PC	Lib	7,018	37.58%	1,172	6.28%	73.80%	4,843	7,018	5,846	–	–	966	–	–	–	–	18,673
Bruce	PC	Lib	7,171	46.81%	636	4.15%	74.45%	6,535	7,171	1,614	–	–	–	–	–	–	–	15,320
Carleton	PC	PC	9,343	61.88%	5,971	39.55%	61.12%	9,343	3,372	2,100	–	–	–	–	–	284	–	15,099
Cochrane North	Lib	PC	3,838	36.89%	1,253	12.04%	78.55%	3,838	2,321	2,585	–	–	–	–	–	1,659	–	10,403
Cochrane South	CCF	CCF	14,190	50.91%	5,999	21.52%	72.55%	8,191	4,307	14,190	–	–	–	–	–	1,186	–	27,874
Dufferin—Simcoe	PC	PC	7,035	54.13%	2,499	19.23%	57.91%	7,035	4,536	1,425	–	–	–	–	–	–	–	12,996
Durham	PC	PC	5,858	45.39%	1,336	10.35%	71.27%	5,858	4,522	2,525	–	–	–	–	–	–	–	12,905
Elgin	PC	PC	7,713	44.58%	592	3.42%	64.40%	7,713	7,121	2,467	–	–	–	–	–	–	–	17,301
Essex North	LL	CCF	7,497	36.49%	790	3.84%	67.38%	6,344	6,707	7,497	–	–	–	–	–	–	–	20,548
Essex South	PC	PC	8,354	55.46%	2,559	16.99%	66.29%	8,354	5,795	914	–	–	–	–	–	–	–	15,063
Fort William	CCF	Lib	6,860	35.93%	225	1.18%	73.47%	5,596	6,860	6,635	–	–	–	–	–	–	–	19,091
Glengarry	Lib	PC	5,557	55.75%	1,788	17.94%	71.63%	5,557	3,769	–	–	–	–	–	–	642	–	9,968
Grenville—Dundas	PC	PC	6,994	59.30%	3,385	28.70%	52.91%	6,994	3,609	1,191	–	–	–	–	–	–	–	11,794
Grey North	PC	PC	6,649	39.78%	383	2.29%	76.85%	6,649	6,266	3,801	–	–	–	–	–	–	–	16,716
Grey South	Lib	Lib	7,822	61.28%	3,892	30.49%	71.91%	3,930	7,822	764	–	–	–	–	–	249	–	12,765
Haldimand—Norfolk	PC	PC	9,805	46.67%	1,778	8.46%	65.42%	9,805	8,027	3,175	–	–	–	–	–	–	–	21,007
Halton	PC	PC	6,377	39.45%	113	0.70%	67.96%	6,377	6,264	3,524	–	–	–	–	–	–	–	16,165
Hamilton East	PC	CCF	10,528	42.82%	153	0.62%	69.79%	10,375	3,683	10,528	–	–	–	–	–	–	–	24,586
Hamilton Centre	PC	CCF	10,561	42.15%	1,688	6.74%	66.67%	8,873	5,619	10,561	–	–	–	–	–	–	–	25,053
Hamilton—Wentworth	PC	PC	10,542	46.42%	4,108	18.09%	69.12%	10,542	5,734	6,434	–	–	–	–	–	–	–	22,710
Hastings East*	PC	PC	5,163	54.14%	2,048	21.48%	63.69%	5,163	3,115	1,258	–	–	–	–	–	–	–	9,536
Hastings West	PC	PC	8,501	50.85%	3,221	19.27%	61.88%	8,501	5,280	2,937	–	–	–	–	–	–	–	16,718
Huron	PC	PC	7,566	50.35%	106	0.71%	75.35%	7,566	7,460	–	–	–	–	–	–	–	–	15,026
Huron—Bruce	PC	PC	6,678	50.97%	255	1.95%	75.50%	6,678	6,423	–	–	–	–	–	–	–	–	13,101
Kenora	CCF	PC	4,292	38.82%	579	5.24%	64.20%	4,292	3,713	3,051	–	–	–	–	–	–	–	11,056
Kent East	PC	Lib	7,536	55.06%	1,385	10.12%	77.18%	6,151	7,536	–	–	–	–	–	–	–	–	13,687
Kent West	PC	PC	9,825	50.75%	291	1.50%	62.38%	9,825	9,534	–	–	–	–	–	–	–	–	19,359
Kingston*	PC	PC	7,367	46.42%	1,008	6.35%	67.97%	7,367	6,359	2,143	–	–	–	–	–	–	–	15,869
Lambton East	PC	PC	5,632	47.85%	511	4.34%	66.08%	5,632	5,121	1,018	–	–	–	–	–	–	–	11,771
Lambton West	PC	PC	7,765	48.90%	2,495	15.71%	66.15%	7,765	5,270	2,845	–	–	–	–	–	–	–	15,880
Lanark	PC	PC	10,077	65.43%	5,879	38.17%	67.91%	10,077	4,198	1,127	–	–	–	–	–	–	–	15,402
Leeds	PC	PC	9,018	51.94%	2,605	15.00%	74.41%	9,018	6,413	1,932	–	–	–	–	–	–	–	17,363
Lincoln	PC	PC	13,826	41.69%	3,297	9.94%	71.26%	13,826	8,361	10,529	–	–	–	–	–	450	–	33,166
London	PC	Lib	12,730	40.75%	1,027	3.29%	64.23%	11,703	12,730	6,803	–	–	–	–	–	–	–	31,236
Middlesex North	PC	PC	6,601	43.35%	1,255	8.24%	63.62%	6,601	5,346	3,281	–	–	–	–	–	–	–	15,228
Middlesex South	PC	PC	6,957	50.74%	1,413	10.31%	68.06%	6,957	5,544	1,209	–	–	–	–	–	–	–	13,710
Muskoka—Ontario	PC	PC	7,197	41.42%	306	1.76%	71.15%	7,197	6,891	3,288	–	–	–	–	–	–	–	17,376
Niagara Falls	PC	Lib	8,253	40.07%	491	2.38%	67.94%	4,582	8,253	7,762	–	–	–	–	–	–	–	20,597
Nipissing	Lib	PC	6,903	40.01%	1,296	7.51%	68.61%	6,903	5,607	3,683	–	–	–	–	–	1,060	–	17,253
Northumberland	PC	PC	8,361	55.88%	3,047	20.36%	70.94%	8,361	5,314	1,288	–	–	–	–	–	–	–	14,963
Ontario	PC	CCF	11,758	42.23%	2,731	9.81%	73.25%	9,027	7,058	11,758	–	–	–	–	–	–	–	27,843
Ottawa East	Lib	Lib	9,407	45.83%	1,630	7.94%	55.25%	7,777	9,407	2,859	–	–	–	–	–	485	–	20,528
Ottawa South	PC	PC	18,955	55.13%	9,142	26.59%	56.58%	18,955	9,813	5,151	–	–	–	–	–	279	185	34,383
Oxford	PC	PC	9,404	45.81%	941	4.58%	61.71%	9,404	8,463	2,662	–	–	–	–	–	–	–	20,529
Parry Sound	Lib	PC	4,343	37.57%	439	3.80%	75.55%	4,343	3,904	3,314	–	–	–	–	–	–	–	11,561
Peel	PC	PC	9,070	47.25%	3,677	19.16%	65.35%	9,070	5,393	4,733	–	–	–	–	–	–	–	19,196
Perth	PC	PC	10,686	45.04%	1,077	4.54%	68.16%	10,686	9,609	3,432	–	–	–	–	–	–	–	23,727
Peterborough	PC	PC	10,257	42.89%	2,528	10.57%	73.09%	10,257	7,729	5,927	–	–	–	–	–	–	–	23,913
Port Arthur	CCF	CCF	8,734	44.93%	2,602	13.39%	62.77%	4,572	6,132	8,734	–	–	–	–	–	–	–	19,438
Prescott	Lib	PC	6,537	56.01%	2,193	18.79%	73.85%	6,537	4,344	179	–	–	–	–	–	611	–	11,671
Prince Edward—Lennox	PC	Lib	6,202	46.45%	55	0.41%	70.16%	6,147	6,202	–	–	–	1,003	–	–	–	–	13,352
Rainy River	LL	LL	3,969	56.32%	891	12.64%	65.70%	3,078	3,969	–	–	–	–	–	–	–	–	7,047
Renfrew North	PC	PC	5,864	44.51%	377	2.86%	72.32%	5,864	5,487	1,824	–	–	–	–	–	–	–	13,175
Renfrew South	PC	PC	6,744	54.07%	1,743	13.97%	69.49%	6,744	5,001	728	–	–	–	–	–	–	–	12,473
Russell	Lib	PC	5,292	41.89%	697	5.52%	58.29%	5,292	4,595	1,611	–	–	–	–	–	1,134	–	12,632
Sault Ste. Marie	CCF	CCF	6,514	41.77%	1,433	9.19%	67.36%	5,081	4,000	6,514	–	–	–	–	–	–	–	15,595
Simcoe Centre	PC	PC	5,791	41.73%	1,782	12.84%	67.22%	5,791	4,009	1,805	–	–	–	–	1,766	506	–	13,877
Simcoe East	PC	PC	6,376	43.17%	1,002	6.78%	71.60%	6,376	5,374	3,018	–	–	–	–	–	–	–	14,768
Stormont	Lib	PC	6,729	39.96%	250	1.48%	72.01%	6,729	6,479	2,976	–	–	–	–	–	655	–	16,839
Sudbury	CCF	PC	8,892	29.01%	279	0.91%	72.57%	8,892	6,949	5,821	–	8,613	–	–	–	378	–	30,653
Temiskaming	CCF	CCF	4,851	41.40%	561	4.79%	79.83%	4,290	2,576	4,851	–	–	–	–	–	–	–	11,717
Victoria	PC	PC	8,830	59.92%	4,173	28.32%	68.21%	8,830	4,657	1,249	–	–	–	–	–	–	–	14,736
Waterloo North	LL	Lib	10,200	37.44%	1,250	4.59%	62.20%	6,726	10,200	8,950	–	–	1,371	–	–	–	–	27,247
Waterloo South	PC	CCF	7,210	35.68%	705	3.49%	69.85%	6,505	6,495	7,210	–	–	–	–	–	–	–	20,210
Welland	PC	Lib	8,961	36.33%	11	0.04%	72.48%	6,756	8,961	8,950	–	–	–	–	–	–	–	24,667
Wellington North	Lib	Lib	7,764	53.05%	893	6.10%	71.06%	6,871	7,764	–	–	–	–	–	–	–	–	14,635
Wellington South	PC	PC	6,913	36.97%	666	3.56%	78.82%	6,913	6,247	5,541	–	–	–	–	–	–	–	18,701
Wentworth	CCF	CCF	13,190	46.35%	2,327	8.18%	67.98%	10,863	4,405	13,190	–	–	–	–	–	–	–	28,458
Windsor—Walkerville	PC	PC	7,730	41.51%	1,422	7.64%	53.63%	7,730	4,585	6,308	–	–	–	–	–	–	–	18,623
Windsor—Sandwich	PC	PC	10,781	53.46%	5,213	25.85%	70.32%	10,781	3,624	5,568	–	–	–	–	–	–	192	20,165
York East	PC	CCF	21,628	42.81%	881	1.74%	63.76%	20,747	7,772	21,628	–	–	–	–	–	370	–	50,517
York North	PC	PC	10,444	39.21%	1,902	7.14%	66.63%	10,444	7,653	8,542	–	–	–	–	–	–	–	26,639
York South	PC	CCF	19,320	49.52%	4,465	11.44%	67.97%	14,855	4,838	19,320	–	–	–	–	–	–	–	39,013
York West	PC	CCF	18,627	43.41%	2,383	5.55%	69.42%	16,244	8,041	18,627	–	–	–	–	–	–	–	42,912
Beaches	PC	CCF	9,910	44.03%	440	1.96%	71.98%	9,470	3,126	9,910	–	–	–	–	–	–	–	22,506
Bellwoods	Lab-Pr	Lab-Pr	7,764	37.17%	1,286	6.16%	69.55%	6,478	2,292	4,353	7,764	–	–	–	–	–	–	20,887
Bracondale	PC	CCF	7,956	45.00%	1,184	6.70%	63.97%	6,772	2,952	7,956	–	–	–	–	–	–	–	17,680
Dovercourt	PC	CCF	12,262	48.16%	3,039	11.93%	64.28%	9,223	3,978	12,262	–	–	–	–	–	–	–	25,463
Eglinton	PC	PC	18,767	51.62%	9,543	26.25%	69.16%	18,767	9,224	8,366	–	–	–	–	–	–	–	36,357
High Park	PC	CCF	11,562	42.24%	1,017	3.72%	74.88%	10,545	5,262	11,562	–	–	–	–	–	–	–	27,369
Parkdale	PC	CCF	11,778	39.52%	650	2.18%	68.34%	11,128	6,900	11,778	–	–	–	–	–	–	–	29,806
Riverdale	PC	CCF	12,429	47.55%	2,159	8.26%	65.32%	10,270	3,195	12,429	–	–	–	–	–	–	245	26,139
St. Andrew	Lab-Pr	Lab-Pr	9,890	49.40%	4,926	24.61%	71.22%	4,964	1,757	3,408	9,890	–	–	–	–	–	–	20,019
St. David	PC	CCF	8,539	41.39%	676	3.28%	66.08%	7,863	3,908	8,539	–	–	–	253	–	–	69	20,632
St. George	PC	PC	10,161	45.23%	2,711	12.07%	61.19%	10,161	4,853	7,450	–	–	–	–	–	–	–	22,464
St. Patrick	PC	PC	6,946	44.06%	1,597	10.13%	66.48%	6,946	3,469	5,349	–	–	–	–	–	–	–	15,764
Woodbine	PC	CCF	12,986	47.36%	2,292	8.36%	68.97%	10,694	3,516	12,986	–	–	–	–	–	–	222	27,418

= open seat
= turnout is above provincial average
= winning candidate was in previous Legislature
= incumbent had switched allegiance
= other incumbents renominated
= campaigned as a Liberal-Labour candidate
= campaigned as a Social Credit candidate

=== Analysis ===
Party candidates in 2nd place
Party in 1st place	Party in 2nd place					Total
Party in 1st place	PC	Lib	LL	CCF	Ind-CCF	Total
Progressive Conservative		43	1	8	1	53
Liberal	8			5		13
Liberal–Labour	1					1
Co-operative Commonwealth	19	2				21
Labor–Progressive	2					2
Total	30	45	1	13	1	90

Candidates ranked 1st to 5th place, by party
Parties	1st	2nd	3rd	4th	5th	Total
█ Progressive Conservative	53	30	7			90
█ Co-operative Commonwealth	21	13	45	2		81
█ Liberal	13	45	28	2		88
█ Labor–Progressive	2					2
█ Liberal–Labour	1	1				2
█ Independent-CCF		1				1
█ Union of Electors			2	9	2	13
█ Independent PC			1	2		3
█ Socialist Labor				3	2	5
█ Social Credit				2		2
█ Independent Labour				1		1
█ Independent				1		1

Resulting composition of the 23rd Legislative Assembly of Ontario
Source		Party					
Source		PC	CCF	Lib	L-L	Lab-Pr	Total
Seats retained	Incumbents returned	40	4	4	1	2	51
Seats retained	Open seats held	4	1				5
Seats changing hands	Incumbents defeated	8	12	7			27
Seats changing hands	Open seats gained	1	4	2			7
Total		53	21	13	1	2	90

=== Seats that changed hands ===
Elections to the 23rd Parliament of Ontario – seats won/lost by party, 1945–1948
Party	1943	Gain from (loss to)										1945
Party	1943	PC		CCF		Lib		Lbr-P		L-L		1945
Progressive Conservative	66			2	(15)	7	(7)					53
Co-operative Commonwealth	8	15	(2)				(1)			1		21
Liberal	11	7	(7)	1						1		13
Labor–Progressive	2											2
Liberal–Labour	3				(1)		(1)					1
Total	90	22	(9)	3	(16)	7	(9)	–	–	2	–	90

There were 34 seats that changed allegiance in the election.

PC to CCF

- Beaches
- Bracondale
- Dovercourt
- Hamilton Centre
- Hamilton East
- High Park
- Ontario
- Parkdale
- Riverdale
- St. David
- Waterloo South
- Woodbine
- York East
- York South
- York West

PC to Liberal

- Brantford
- Bruce
- Kent East
- London
- Niagara Falls
- Prince Edward—Lennox
- Welland

CCF to PC

- Kenora
- Sudbury

CCF to Liberal

- Fort William

Liberal to PC

- Cochrane North
- Glengarry
- Nipissing
- Parry Sound
- Prescott
- Russell
- Stormont

Liberal-Labour to CCF

- Essex North

Liberal-Labour to Liberal

- Waterloo North

== See also ==
- Politics of Ontario
- List of Ontario political parties
- Premier of Ontario
- Leader of the Opposition (Ontario)
