= Northwestern Ontario =

Coordinates: 51°N 91°W

- Secondary region
- Country: Canada
- Province: Ontario
- Largest city: Thunder Bay; 108,843 (2021)

Area
  - Total: 526,417.35 km^{2} (203,250.88 sq mi)

Population (2021)
  - Total: 232,299
  - Density: 0.5/km^{2} (1.3/sq mi)
- Time zone: UTC−5 (EST)
  - Summer (DST): UTC−4 (east-only)

Northwestern Ontario is a secondary region of Northern Ontario in the Canadian province of Ontario which lies north and west of Lake Superior and west of Hudson Bay and James Bay. It includes most of subarctic Ontario. Its western boundary is the Canadian province of Manitoba, which disputed Ontario's claim to the western part of the region. Ontario's right to Northwestern Ontario was determined by the Judicial Committee of the Privy Council in 1884 and confirmed by the Canada (Ontario Boundary) Act, 1889, of the Parliament of the United Kingdom. In 1912, the Parliament of Canada by the Ontario Boundaries Extension Act gave jurisdiction over the District of Patricia to Ontario, thereby extending the northern boundary of the province to Hudson Bay.

== Geographic subdivisions ==
Northwestern Ontario consists of the districts of Kenora, Rainy River and Thunder Bay. Major communities in the region include Thunder Bay, Kenora, Dryden, Fort Frances, Sioux Lookout, Greenstone, Red Lake, Marathon, and Atikokan. There are also several dozen First Nations in Northwestern Ontario.

== Time zones ==
All of Northwestern Ontario observes UTC−5 during the winter months. Areas east of the 90th meridian west including Thunder Bay observe Eastern Standard Time (UTC−5) during the winter and Eastern Daylight Time (UTC−4) in the summer and are synchronized with the rest of Ontario. Areas to the west of the 90th meridian west including Kenora are aligned with Manitoba and are on Central Daylight Time (UTC−5), equivalent to Eastern Standard Time year-round.

== Population ==
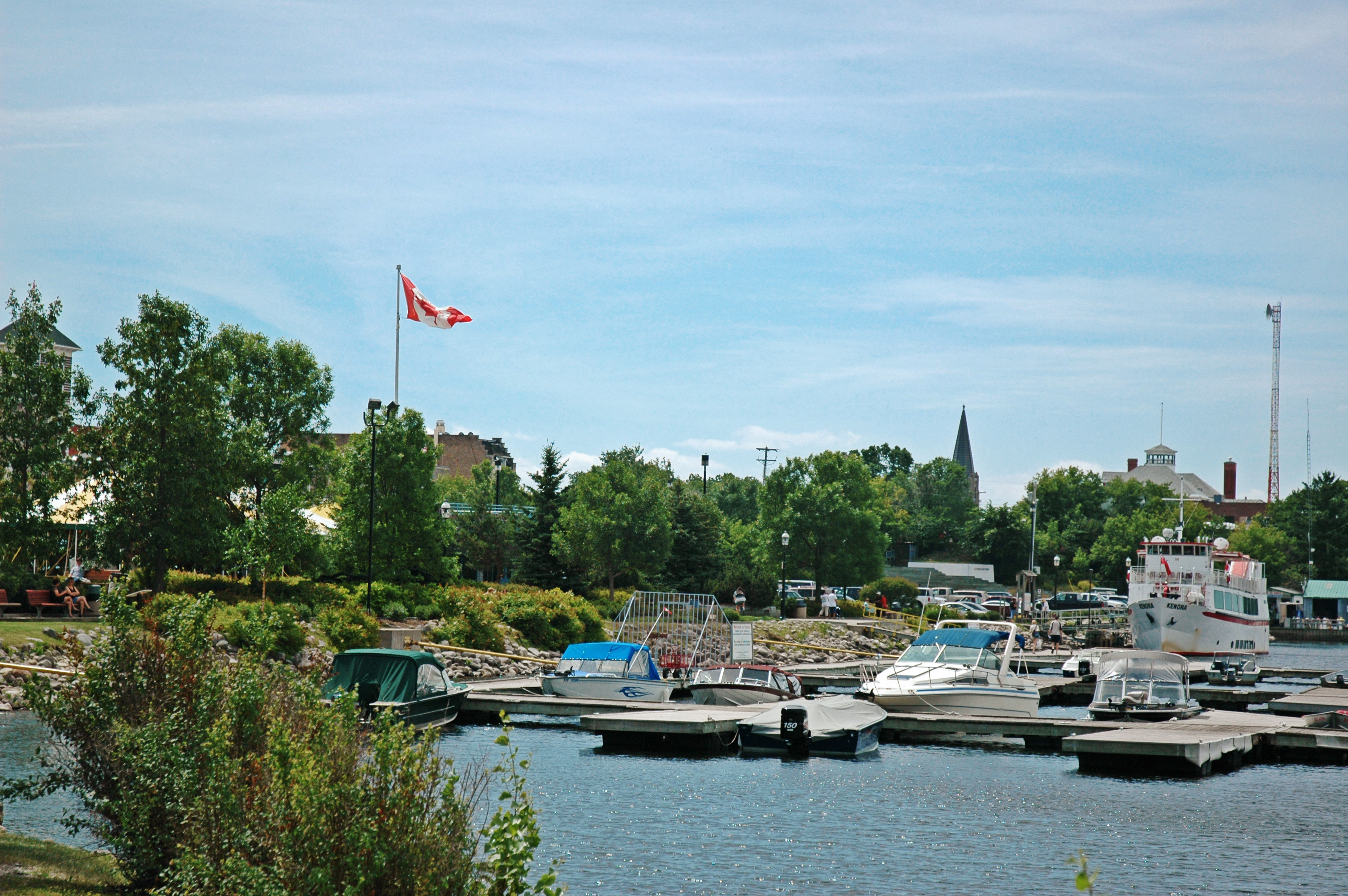
Kenora

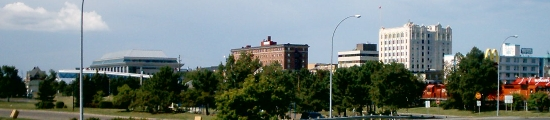
Thunder Bay

Northwestern Ontario is the province's most sparsely populated region: 54% of the region's entire population lives in the Thunder Bay census metropolitan area alone. Aside from Thunder Bay, Kenora is the only other municipality in the entire region with a population greater than 10,000.

The overall population of Northwestern Ontario declined in the early 21st century, mainly because of a downturn in the forestry sector, but some individual municipalities within the region have seen modest population growth over the period.

Population of Northwestern Ontario
District	2021	±	2016	±	2011	±	2006	±	2001	±	1996
Northwestern Ontario	232,299	0.3%	231,691	3.4%	224,034	−4.7%	235,046	0.1%	234,771	−3.8%	244,117
Kenora District	66,000	0.7%	65,533	13.8%	57,607	−10.6%	64,419	4.2%	61,802	−2.5%	63,360
Rainy River District	19,437	−3.3%	20,110	−1.3%	20,370	−5.5%	21,564	−2.5%	22,109	−4.4%	23,138
Thunder Bay District	146,862	0.6%	146,048	0.0%	146,057	−2.0%	149,063	−1.2%	150,860	−4.3%	157,619

== Politics ==
Northwestern Ontarians tend to lean left politically, mainly due to the history and influence of labour unions. At the federal level, Northwestern Ontario is represented by Liberal MPs Marcus Powlowski in Thunder Bay—Rainy River and Patty Hajdu in Thunder Bay—Superior North, as well as Conservative MP Eric Melillo in the Kenora District,. Provincially, PC Greg Rickford represents Kenora—Rainy River, NDP Sol Mamakwa represents Kiiwetinoong, PC Kevin Holland represents Thunder Bay—Atikokan, and NDP Lise Vaugeois represents Thunder Bay—Superior North.

In 2005, some residents of the region expressed dissatisfaction at the level of attention paid to the region by the provincial government. Some, most notably former Kenora mayor Dave Canfield, and Fort Frances town councillor Tannis Drysdale, have proposed the idea of the region as a whole, or parts of it, seceding from Ontario to join Manitoba, although the campaign did not attract widespread public support.

== See also ==
- Northern Ontario
- Northeastern Ontario
