= List of members of the Canadian House of Commons (K) =

== Ka ==
- Susan Kadis b. 1953 first elected in 2004 as Liberal member for Thornhill, Ontario.
- Thomas Erlin Kaiser b. 1863 first elected in 1925 as Conservative member for Ontario, Ontario.
- Randy Kamp b. 1953 first elected in 2004 as Conservative member for Dewdney—Alouette, British Columbia.
- Darshan Kang b. 1951 first elected in 2015 as Liberal member for Calgary Skyview, Alberta.
- Andrew Kania b. 1967 first elected in 2008 as Liberal member for Brampton West, Ontario.
- Robert Phillip Kaplan b. 1936 first elected in 1968 as Liberal member for Don Valley, Ontario.
- Nancy Karetak-Lindell b. 1957 first elected in 1997 as Liberal member for Nunavut, Northwest Territories.
- Jim Karpoff b. 1937 first elected in 1988 as New Democratic Party member for Surrey North, British Columbia.
- Jim Karygiannis b. 1955 first elected in 1988 as Liberal member for Scarborough—Agincourt, Ontario.
- Charles Edwin Kaulbach b. 1834 first elected in 1878 as Conservative member for Lunenburg, Nova Scotia.
- William Frederic Kay b. 1876 first elected in 1911 as Liberal member for Missisquoi, Quebec.
- Arielle Kayabaga first elected in 2021 as Liberal member for London West, Ontario.

== Kea–Kem ==
- James Russell Keays b. 1913 first elected in 1958 as Progressive Conservative member for Îles-de-la-Madeleine, Quebec.
- Gerald Keddy b. 1953 first elected in 1997 as Progressive Conservative member for South Shore, Nova Scotia.
- Francis Henry Keefer b. 1860 first elected in 1917 as Unionist member for Port Arthur and Kenora, Ontario.
- Thomas Twining Keefler b. 1824 first elected in 1882 as Liberal member for Lunenburg, Nova Scotia.
- Joseph Keeler b. 1824 first elected in 1867 as Liberal-Conservative member for Northumberland East, Ontario.
- Cyril Keeper b. 1943 first elected in 1980 as New Democratic Party member for Winnipeg—St. James, Manitoba.
- Tina Keeper b. 1962 first elected in 2006 as Liberal member for Churchill, Manitoba.
- James Kelleher b. 1930 first elected in 1984 as Progressive Conservative member for Sault Ste. Marie, Ontario.
- Donald Ferdinand Kellner b. 1879 first elected in 1921 as Progressive member for Edmonton East, Alberta.
- Mike Kelloway b. 1970 first elected in 2019 as Liberal member for Cape Breton—Canso, Nova Scotia.
- Matthew Kellway b. 1964 first elected in 2011 as New Democratic Party member for Beaches—East York, Ontario.
- Fenwick Lionel Kelly b. 1863 first elected in 1923 as Liberal member for North Cape Breton and Victoria, Nova Scotia.
- Leonard Patrick Kelly b. 1927 first elected in 1962 as Liberal member for York West, Ontario.
- Norman Kelly b. 1941 first elected in 1980 as Liberal member for Scarborough Centre, Ontario.
- Pat Kelly b. 1971 first elected in 2015 as Conservative member for Calgary Rocky Ridge, Alberta.
- Albert Edward Kemp b. 1858 first elected in 1900 as Conservative member for Toronto East, Ontario.
- Bill Kempling b. 1921 first elected in 1972 as Progressive Conservative member for Halton—Wentworth, Ontario.
- George Kempt b. 1821 first elected in 1867 as Liberal member for Victoria South, Ontario.

== Ken–Key ==
- Arthur Samuel Kendall b. 1861 first elected in 1900 as Liberal member for Cape Breton, Nova Scotia.
- James Kendry b. 1845 first elected in 1896 as Conservative member for Peterborough West, Ontario.
- Cyril Kennedy b. 1915 first elected in 1957 as Progressive Conservative member for Colchester—Hants, Nova Scotia.
- Donald MacBeth Kennedy b. 1884 first elected in 1921 as Progressive member for Edmonton West, Alberta.
- Dougald Kennedy b. 1869 first elected in 1921 as Progressive member for Port Arthur and Kenora, Ontario.
- Gerard Kennedy b. 1960 first elected in 2008 as Liberal member for Parkdale—High Park, Ontario.
- James Buckham Kennedy b. 1844 first elected in 1904 as Liberal member for New Westminster, British Columbia.
- John Wilfred Kennedy b. 1879 first elected in 1919 as United Farmers of Ontario-Labour member for Glengarry and Stormont, Ontario.
- Orvis A. Kennedy b. 1907 first elected in 1938 as Social Credit member for Edmonton East, Alberta.
- William Costello Kennedy b. 1868 first elected in 1917 as Laurier Liberal member for Essex North, Ontario.
- William Walker Kennedy b. 1882 first elected in 1925 as Conservative member for Winnipeg South Centre, Manitoba.
- Jason Kenney b. 1968 first elected in 1997 as Reform member for Calgary Southeast, Alberta.
- Thomas Edward Kenny b. 1833 first elected in 1887 as Conservative member for Halifax, Nova Scotia.
- Peter Kent b. 1943 first elected in 2008 as Conservative member for Thornhill, Ontario.
- William Richard Kent b. 1905 first elected in 1949 as Liberal member for Humber—St. George's, Newfoundland and Labrador.
- Allan Kerpan b. 1954 first elected in 1993 as Reform member for Moose Jaw—Lake Centre, Saskatchewan.
- Greg Kerr b. 1947 first elected in 2008 as Conservative member for West Nova, Nova Scotia.
- William Kerr b. 1836 first elected in 1874 as Liberal member for Northumberland West, Ontario.
- Stan Keyes b. 1953 first elected in 1988 as Liberal member for Hamilton West, Ontario.

== Kh ==
- Iqra Khalid b. 1985 first elected in 2015 as Liberal member for Mississauga—Erin Mills, Ontario.
- Wajid Khan b. 1946 first elected in 2004 as Liberal member for Mississauga—Streetsville, Ontario.
- Arpan Khanna b. 1990 first elected in 2023 as Conservative member for Oxford, Ontario.
- Kamal Khera b. 1989 first elected in 2015 as Liberal member for Brampton West, Ontario.

== Ki ==
- Jeff Kibble first elected in 2025 as Conservative member for Cowichan—Malahat—Langford, British Columbia.
- Thomas Joseph Kickham b. 1901 first elected in 1949 as Liberal member for King's, Prince Edward Island.
- Edward Kidd b. 1849 first elected in 1900 as Conservative member for Carleton, Ontario.
- Thomas Ashmore Kidd b. 1889 first elected in 1945 as Progressive Conservative member for Kingston City, Ontario.
- Eric Kierans b. 1914 first elected in 1968 as Liberal member for Duvernay, Quebec.
- Alexandre Edouard Kierzkowski b. 1816 first elected in 1867 as Liberal member for St. Hyacinthe, Quebec.
- Robert Kilger b. 1944 first elected in 1988 as Liberal member for Stormont—Dundas, Ontario.
- David Kilgour b. 1941 first elected in 1979 as Progressive Conservative member for Edmonton—Strathcona, Alberta.
- Frank Killam b. 1843 first elected in 1869 as Liberal member for Yarmouth, Nova Scotia.
- Thomas Killam b. 1802 first elected in 1867 as Anti-Confederate member for Yarmouth, Nova Scotia.
- Marie Thérèse Killens b. 1927 first elected in 1979 as Liberal member for Saint-Michel, Quebec.
- Francis Edwin Kilvert b. 1838 first elected in 1878 as Conservative member for Hamilton, Ontario.
- Lawrence Kindt b. 1901 first elected in 1958 as Progressive Conservative member for Macleod, Alberta.
- Alex Kindy b. 1930 first elected in 1984 as Progressive Conservative member for Calgary East, Alberta.
- Frederick John King b. 1923 first elected in 1979 as Progressive Conservative member for Okanagan—Similkameen, British Columbia.
- George Gerald King b. 1836 first elected in 1878 as Liberal member for Queen's, New Brunswick.
- James Horace King b. 1873 first elected in 1922 as Liberal member for Kootenay East, British Columbia.
- John Warwick King b. 1856 first elected in 1921 as Progressive member for Huron North, Ontario.
- William Lyon Mackenzie King b. 1874 first elected in 1908 as Liberal member for Waterloo North, Ontario.
- John James Kinley b. 1881 first elected in 1935 as Liberal member for Queens—Lunenburg, Nova Scotia.
- Joseph Robbins Kinney b. 1839 first elected in 1882 as Liberal member for Yarmouth, Nova Scotia.
- J. Ralph Kirk b. 1895 first elected in 1936 as Liberal member for Antigonish—Guysborough, Nova Scotia.
- John Angus Kirk b. 1837 first elected in 1874 as Liberal member for Guysborough, Nova Scotia.
- Thomas Andrew Murray Kirk b. 1906 first elected in 1949 as Liberal member for Digby—Yarmouth, Nova Scotia.
- Gordon Kirkby b. 1958 first elected in 1993 as Liberal member for Prince Albert—Churchill River, Saskatchewan.
- Rhonda Kirkland first elected in 2025 as Conservative member for Oshawa, Ontario.
- George Airey Kirkpatrick b. 1841 first elected in 1870 as Conservative member for Frontenac, Ontario.
- Thomas Kirkpatrick b. 1805 first elected in 1867 as Conservative member for Frontenac, Ontario.
- Robert Gordon Kitchen b. 1957 first elected in 2015 as Conservative member for Souris—Moose Mountain, Saskatchewan.

== Kl ==
- Ernie Klassen first elected in 2025 as Liberal member for South Surrey—White Rock, British Columbia.
- Milton L. Klein b. 1910 first elected in 1963 as Liberal member for Cartier, Quebec.
- James Bell Klock b. 1856 first elected in 1896 as Conservative member for Nipissing, Ontario.
- Christian Kloepfer b. 1847 first elected in 1896 as Conservative member for Wellington South, Ontario.

== Km ==
- Tom Kmiec b. 1981 first elected in 2015 as Conservative member for Calgary Shepard, Alberta.

== Kn ==
- Roy Knight b. 1891 first elected in 1945 as Cooperative Commonwealth Federation member for Saskatoon City, Saskatchewan.
- Bill Knight b. 1947 first elected in 1971 as New Democratic Party member for Assiniboia, Saskatchewan.
- John Evans Knowles b. 1914 first elected in 1957 as Progressive Conservative member for Norfolk, Ontario.
- Stanley Knowles b. 1908 first elected in 1942 as Cooperative Commonwealth Federation member for Winnipeg North Centre, Manitoba.
- William David Knowles b. 1908 first elected in 1968 as Progressive Conservative member for Norfolk—Haldimand, Ontario.
- William Erskine Knowles b. 1872 first elected in 1906 as Liberal member for Assiniboia West, Saskatchewan.
- Andrew Knox b. 1866 first elected in 1917 as Liberal member for Prince Albert, Saskatchewan.
- Gar Knutson b. 1956 first elected in 1993 as Liberal member for Elgin—Norfolk, Ontario.

== Ko ==
- Ed Komarnicki b. 1949 first elected in 2004 as Conservative member for Souris—Moose Mountain, Saskatchewan.
- Margaret Konantz b. 1899 first elected in 1963 as Liberal member for Winnipeg South, Manitoba.
- Helena Konanz b. 1961 first elected in 2025 as Conservative member for Similkameen—South Okanagan—West Kootenay, British Columbia.
- Derrek Konrad b. 1943 first elected in 1997 as Reform member for Prince Albert, Saskatchewan.
- Stanley Korchinski b. 1929 first elected in 1958 as Progressive Conservative member for Mackenzie, Saskatchewan.
- Maka Kotto b. 1961 first elected in 2004 as Bloc Québécois member for Saint-Lambert, Quebec.
- Allan Koury b. 1930 first elected in 1988 as Progressive Conservative member for Hochelaga—Maisonneuve, Quebec.
- Annie Koutrakis b. 1960 first elected in 2019 as Liberal member for Vimy, Quebec.

== Kr ==
- Karen Kraft Sloan b. 1952 first elected in 1993 as Liberal member for York—Simcoe, Ontario.
- Michael Kram b. 1978 first elected in 2019 as Conservative member Regina—Wascana, Saskatchewan.
- Daryl Kramp b. 1947 first elected in 2004 as Conservative member for Prince Edward—Hastings, Ontario.
- Shelby Kramp-Neuman b. 1978 first elected in 2021 as Conservative member Hastings—Lennox and Addington, Ontario.
- Hugo Kranz b. 1834 first elected in 1878 as Conservative member for Waterloo North, Ontario.
- Lyle Kristiansen b. 1939 first elected in 1980 as New Democratic Party member for Kootenay West, British Columbia.
- Tamara Kronis first elected in 2025 as Conservative member for Nanaimo—Ladysmith, British Columbia.

== Ku ==
- John Kucherepa b. 1919 first elected in 1957 as Progressive Conservative member for High Park, Ontario.
- Walter Frederick Kuhl b. 1905 first elected in 1935 as Social Credit member for Jasper—Edson, Alberta.
- Harry Kuntz b. 1929 first elected in 1972 as Progressive Conservative member for Battle River, Alberta.
- Damien Kurek b. 1989 first elected in 2019 as Conservative member for Battle River—Crowfoot, Alberta.
- Ned Kuruc first elected in 2025 as Conservative member for Hamilton East—Stoney Creek, Ontario.
- John Kushner b. 1923 first elected in 1979 as Progressive Conservative member for Calgary East, Alberta.
- Stephanie Kusie b. 1973 first elected in 2017 as Conservative member for Calgary Midnapore, Alberta.
- Irek Kusmierczyk b. 1978 first elected in 2019 as Liberal member for Windsor—Tecumseh, Ontario.

== Kw ==
- Jenny Kwan b. 1967 first elected in 2015 as New Democratic Party member for Vancouver East, British Columbia.

== Ky ==
- George William Kyte b. 1864 first elected in 1908 as Liberal member for Richmond, Nova Scotia.
