= Howard Hampton =

Canadian politician (born 1952)

The Honourable Howard Hampton ECO
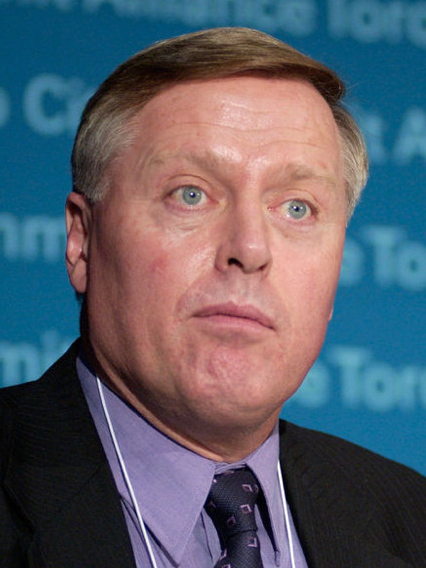
- Hampton in 2003

Leader of the Ontario New Democratic Party
- In office June 22, 1996 – March 7, 2009
- Preceded by: Bob Rae
- Succeeded by: Andrea Horwath

Ontario MPP
- In office 1999–2011
- Preceded by: Riding established
- Succeeded by: Sarah Campbell
- Constituency: Kenora—Rainy River
- In office 1987–1999
- Preceded by: Jack Pierce
- Succeeded by: Riding abolished
- Constituency: Rainy River

Personal details
- Born: Howard George Hampton; May 17, 1952 (age 74) Fort Frances, Ontario, Canada
- Party: Ontario New Democratic
- Spouse: Shelley Martel
- Children: Sarah Hampton; Jonathan Hampton
- Relatives: Elie Martel (father-in-law)
- Occupation: Lawyer

Howard George Hampton ECO (born May 17, 1952) is a politician who was a member of Provincial Parliament for the province of Ontario. He served in the Legislative Assembly of Ontario, Canada, from 1987 to 1999 in the electoral district of Rainy River, and from 1999 to 2011 in the redistributed electoral district of Kenora—Rainy River. A member of the Ontario New Democratic Party, he was also the party's leader from 1996 to 2009. Hampton retired from the legislature at the 2011 Ontario provincial election and subsequently joined Fasken Martineau DuMoulin LLP as a member of the law firm's corporate social responsibility and aboriginal affairs groups.

His wife, Shelley Martel, was also an MPP until 2007, representing Nickel Belt.

== Early life, education, and early career ==
Hampton was born in Fort Frances, Ontario to a blue collar family, George (April 17, 1928 - January 2, 2006) and Elsie (November 8, 1931 - April 18, 2016) Hampton. He was a good student, but also athletically gifted and politically active. He first joined the NDP when he was a teenager.

Hampton took an undergraduate degree in philosophy and religion from Dartmouth College in New Hampshire, where he played varsity hockey for the school's Division I NCAA ice hockey team. He later obtained a degree in education from the University of Toronto and a law degree from the University of Ottawa. He worked as a lawyer for the Canadian Labour Congress, and for the provincial NDP government of Allan Blakeney in Saskatchewan.

== Enters provincial politics ==
Hampton sought election to the Ontario legislature under the NDP banner in the 1977 provincial election, placing third against incumbent Liberal Pat Reid and Progressive Conservative Gordon Armstrong in Rainy River. He ran for the riding again in the 1985 provincial election, and lost to Progressive Conservative candidate Jack Pierce by 278 votes.

== Cabinet minister ==
Hampton was elected to Queen's Park on his third attempt, in the provincial election of 1987.He was re-elected in the 1990 provincial election, in which the NDP won a majority government. On October 1, 1990, he was appointed Attorney General in the government of Bob Rae.

By all accounts, Hampton and Rae were not cabinet allies. Hampton disapproved of many of the Rae government's centrist policies; in particular, he opposed Rae's decision to retreat from an election pledge to introduce public automobile insurance in the province. Journalist Thomas Walkom has argued that Rae deliberately undermined Hampton's control over the Attorney General's office, staffing the ministry with bureaucrats with whom he was ideologically incompatible. However, Walkom has also noted that Hampton supported Rae's decision to impose a Social Contract of wage restraints and cost-saving measures on Ontario public servants.

Following a cabinet shuffle on February 3, 1993, Hampton was demoted to Minister of Natural Resources, responsible for Native Affairs. Marion Boyd replaced him as Attorney General. The NDP was defeated in the provincial election of 1995, and Hampton was re-elected over Progressive Conservative Lynn Beyak by only 205 votes.

=== Cabinet posts ===
Rae ministry, Province of Ontario (1990–1995)
Cabinet posts (2)
Predecessor	Office	Successor
Bud Wildman	Minister of Natural Resources; 1993–1995; Also Responsible for Native Affairs	Chris Hodgson
Ian Scott	Attorney General; 1990–1993	Marion Boyd

== Ontario NDP Leader ==
Howard Hampton at Queen's Park addressing CUPE 3903 members protesting against back to work legislation during a York University strike

After Rae retired from provincial politics, Hampton became the leader of the NDP on June 22, 1996, beating Frances Lankin, who was seen as a Rae ally and whom many had considered the front-runner, on the third ballot. Leadership candidate Peter Kormos and his support generally went to Hampton rather than Lankin, which was seen as important to Hampton's victory. Tony Silipo also ran for the leadership and would become Hampton's Deputy Leader until 1999.

In the 1999 Ontario election, some progressives and union leaders, who had been a crucial source of NDP support before 1995, attempted to defeat Mike Harris, the Progressive Conservative premier, by abandoning the NDP for the Liberals. This tactical voting, commonly called "strategic voting," did not succeed in ousting the Harris government, but nearly decimated the NDP, as they took just nine seats and 12 per cent of the popular vote in their worst election showing since the 1950s. As Hampton was not judged to have been at fault, he stayed on as leader. Hampton himself faced a challenging re-election; the Harris government had reduced the number of ridings in Ontario from 130 to 103, and Hampton faced off against Frank Miclash, the Liberal MPP for the adjoining Kenora riding, in the amalgamated riding of Kenora-Rainy River. Hampton defeated Miclash by 3,000 votes.

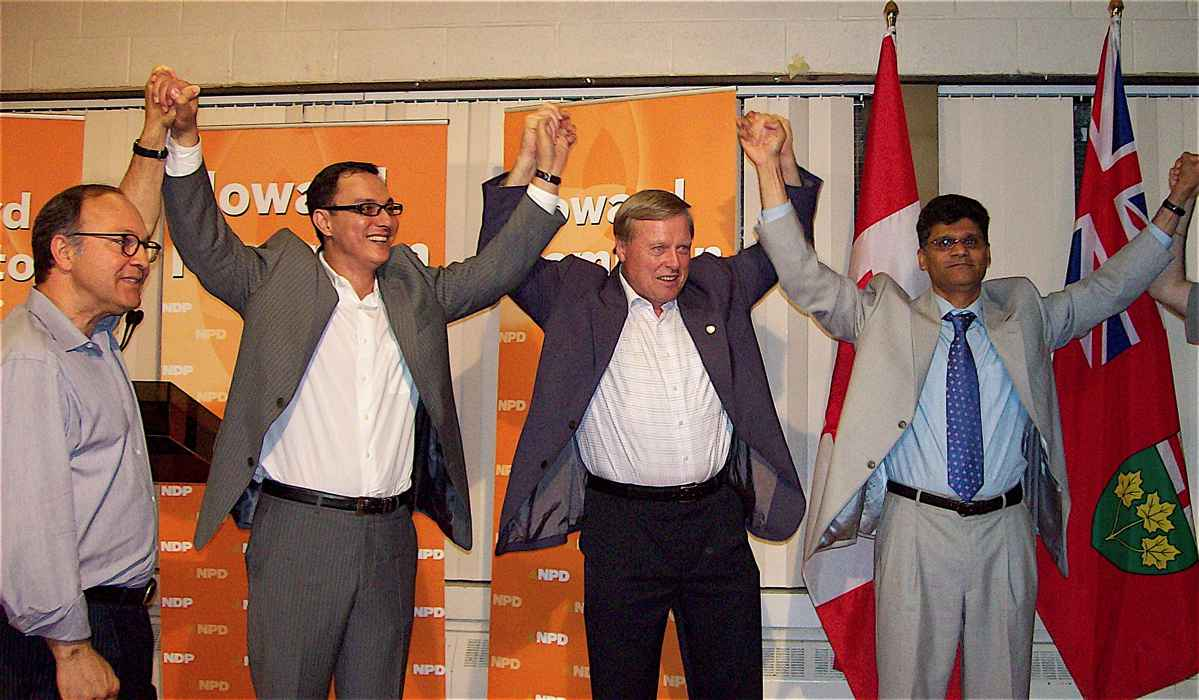
Howard Hampton shares the stage at Mohamed Boudjenane's nomination meeting with fellow NDP politicians and candidates. Pictured from left to right; Rosario Marchese, MPP Trinity–Spadina; Mohamed Boudjenane, provincial candidate for Etobicoke North; Howard Hampton, Ontario NDP Leader; and Ali Naqvi, federal NDP candidate for Etobicoke North.July 9, 2007.

Hampton endorsed Bill Blaikie in the latter's unsuccessful bid for the federal New Democratic Party leadership in 2002. This decision was unpopular with some other members of his caucus, including Deputy Leader Marilyn Churley who was a leading supporter of Jack Layton.

In Harris' second term, the government unveiled plans to privatize the public electricity utility, Ontario Hydro. Hampton quickly distinguished himself as an advocate of maintaining public ownership of the utility, and published a book on the subject, Public Power, in 2003. Harris' successor as premier, Ernie Eves, ultimately reached the decision not to sell the hydro utility.

Hampton and the NDP won only seven seats in the 2003 Ontario election, losing official party status for the first time since 1963. However, Hampton retained his seat and the party increased its share of the popular vote by 2 per cent. After intense lobbying to lower the minimum number of seats for party status, a compromise was reached which allowed additional funding for the NDP and more inquiry opportunities during Question Period.

Ultimately, this controversy was all for nought as on May 13, 2004, the NDP regained official party status in a by-election in Hamilton East, where city councillor Andrea Horwath was elected to fill the vacancy left by the death of Liberal member Dominic Agostino. When Marilyn Churley resigned her Toronto—Danforth seat in May 2005, the NDP was granted official party status at first until the by-election, and then until the 2007 provincial election; NDP candidate Peter Tabuns won the seat.

The Ontario NDP increased its seat count to nine in September 2006, when well-known local United Church minister Cheri DiNovo won a by-election. The seat became vacant when Liberal MPP Gerard Kennedy resigned to seek the Liberal Party of Canada leadership.

Hampton launched the Ontario NDP's 2007 provincial election campaign at the party's Fresh Ideas New Energy January 2007 policy convention. Hampton's keynote speech focused on the party's campaign to raise the minimum wage to $10 an hour, and signalled the NDP's renewed focus on matters of economic justice.

Hampton's NDP increased its seat count to 10 in February 2007, when businessman and community activist Paul Ferreira defeated star Liberal candidate Laura Albanese in a byelection in the Toronto riding of York South-Weston. The seat became vacant when Liberal cabinet minister Joe Cordiano resigned. The NDP's campaign for the $10 minimum wage and its opposition to a controversial 25 per cent pay raise for MPPs were cited as key factors in the upset win.

Despite several encouraging opinion polls that predicted a gain of several seats, Hampton's NDP failed to increase its seat count beyond 10 in the 2007 provincial election. While there was speculation following the election that he may retire, Hampton announced at the November 24, 2007, NDP provincial council that he was staying as party leader. However, in April 2008, he indicated he was considering his political future and, on June 14, 2008, he announced that he would not stand for re-election as party leader at the March 2009 party convention. He remained an MPP for the remainder of his parliamentary mandate, but did not run in the 2011 election.

== Recent career ==
Hampton currently lives in Fort Frances. He and his wife Shelley Martel are separated.

After leaving politics, Hampton worked for several years for the Toronto law firm Fasken Martineau.

In November 2014, Hampton was appointed as a consultant to federal NDP leader Thomas Mulcair on the Northern Ontario Ring of Fire mining development. After several months of being encouraged by the party to run as its candidate in Kenora against federal Natural Resources minister Greg Rickford, Hampton announced that he would seek the party's nomination in the riding for the October 19, 2015 federal election; he subsequently won the nomination. The federal riding includes much of Hampton's old provincial riding. Hampton finished second behind the Liberal candidate, former MP and cabinet minister Bob Nault, pushing Rickford into third place.

== Election results ==
2015 Canadian federal election: Kenora
Party	Candidate	Votes	%
Liberal	Bob Nault	10,898	35.39
New Democratic	Howard Hampton	10,379	33.71
Conservative	Greg Rickford	8,760	28.45
Green	Ember C. McKilop	501	1.63
Independent	Kelvin Boucher-Chicago	162	0.53
Total valid votes		30,791	100.00

2007 Ontario general election: Kenora-Rainy River
Party	Candidate	Votes	%	±%
New Democratic	Howard Hampton	14,281	60.62	+0.87
Liberal	Mike Wood	5,752	24.42	-1.31
Progressive Conservative	Penny Lucas	2,757	11.70	-1.05
Green	Jo Jo Holiday	769	3.26	+1.49
Total valid votes		23,559	100.00	
New Democrat hold		Swing	+1.09	

^ Change is from redistributed results

2003 Ontario general election: Kenora-Rainy River
Party	Candidate	Votes	%	±%
New Democratic	Howard Hampton	15,666	60.12	+15.38
Liberal	Geoff McClain	6,746	25.69	-9.45
Progressive Conservative	Cathe Hoszowski	3,343	12.83	-4.36
Green	Dan King	305	1.17	
Total valid votes		26,060	100.0	

1999 Ontario general election: Kenora-Rainy River
Party	Candidate	Votes	%
New Democratic	Howard Hampton	14,269	44.74
Liberal	Frank Miclash	11,209	35.14
Progressive Conservative	Lynn Beyak	5,483	17.19
Independent	Richard Bruyere	934	2.93
Total valid votes		31,895	100.0
