= Kenora—Rainy River =

Kenora—Rainy River could refer to:

- Kenora—Rainy River (federal electoral district)
- Kenora—Rainy River (provincial electoral district)
