= Roger Valley =

Canadian politician (born 1957)

Member of Parliament for Kenora
- In office 2004–2008
- Preceded by: Bob Nault
- Succeeded by: Greg Rickford

Personal details
- Born: January 29, 1957 (age 69) Kenora, Ontario
- Party: Liberal
- Spouse: Carol Valley
- Profession: Commercial fisherman

Roger Valley (born January 29, 1957, in Kenora, Ontario) is a Canadian politician. He was a member of the House of Commons of Canada from 2004 to 2008, representing the riding of Kenora for the Liberal Party.

Valley worked as a commercial fisherman before entering federal politics. He also served as a city councillor and mayor of Dryden, and was the president of the local provincial Liberal Party riding association for almost ten years.

He was elected to parliament in the 2004 federal election, defeating NDP candidate Susan Barclay and Conservative Bill Brown in a close three-way race. The seat was left open after former Liberal cabinet minister Robert Nault announced his retirement from politics.

Valley initially won the Liberal nomination in a close contest against Charles Fox, a local aboriginal leader. Unlike the situation in some other Ontario ridings, the nomination battle did not result in lingering divisions for the local party organization; Fox endorsed Valley during the general election.

In the 2006 federal election Valley was re-elected in another close race against Brown and Barclay. He lost to Greg Rickford of the Conservative Party in 2008.

== Election results ==
2008 Canadian federal election: Kenora
Party	Candidate	Votes	%	±%	Expenditures
Conservative	Greg Rickford	9,395	40.46	+9.47	$80,724
Liberal	Roger Valley	7,344	31.63	-4.89	$63,788
New Democratic	Tania Cameron	5,394	23.23	-6.72	$59,298
Green	JoJo Holiday	1,087	4.68	+2.14	$362
Total valid votes/expense limit		23,220	100.00	$90,484	
Total rejected ballots		94	0.40	+0.09	
Turnout		23,314	55.37	-8.11	
Conservative gain from Liberal		Swing		-7.18	

2006 Canadian federal election: Kenora
Party	Candidate	Votes	%	±%	Expenditures
Liberal	Roger Valley	9,937	36.52	+0.29	$75,329
Conservative	Bill Brown	8,434	30.99	+3.07	$62,258
New Democratic	Susan Barclay	8,149	29.95	-2.11	$79,469
Green	Dave Vasey	692	2.54	-1.26	$0
Total valid votes/expense limit		27,212	100.00	–	
Total rejected ballots		85	0.31	-0.22	
Turnout		27,297	63.48	+8.22	

2004 Canadian federal election: Kenora
Party	Candidate	Votes	%	±%	Expenditures
Liberal	Roger Valley	8,563	36.23	–	$66,623
New Democratic	Susan Barclay	7,577	32.06	–	$34,796
Conservative	Bill Brown	6,598	27.92	–	$27,132
Green	Carl Chaboyer	898	3.80	–	$1,530
Total valid votes/expense limit		23,636	100.00	–	
Total rejected ballots		126	0.53		
Turnout		23,762	55.26		
