= James Arthur Mathieu =

Canadian politician

Ontario MPP
- In office December 11, 1911 – May 10, 1923
- Preceded by: William Alfred Preston
- Succeeded by: John Fullarton Callan
- Constituency: Rainy River
- In office December 1, 1926 – September 17, 1929
- Preceded by: John Fullarton Callan
- Succeeded by: William Herbert Elliott
- Constituency: Rainy River

Personal details
- Born: August 21, 1869 Alma, Wisconsin
- Died: November 23, 1966 (aged 97)
- Party: Conservative
- Profession: Lumber merchant

James Arthur Mathieu (August 21, 1869 – November 23, 1966) was known as "the last of the lumber kings," as well as "the Mighty Man of the Woods" and "the Lath King of America." Born in Alma, Wisconsin., he became an Ontario lumber merchant, philanthropist and political figure. He represented Rainy River in the Legislative Assembly of Ontario initially as a Liberal-Conservative in 1911, and then as a Conservative from 1914 to 1923 and 1926 to 1929.

== Biography ==
Having worked in his youth as a log driver on the Mississippi River, Mathieu came to Rainy River from Minnesota around 1903 as a manager of the Rainy River Lumber Company's sawmill, later becoming manager and vice-president at the Shevlin-Clarke Company. He was later involved in controversy as part of what became known as the "Old Tory Timber Ring," when fellow Conservative Howard Ferguson, as Minister of Lands and Forests, arranged for the sale of three timber limits in the Quetico Forest Reserve to Shevlin-Clarke for less than half the price they would have normally fetched, and the company later paid a fine of $1.5 million for breaching the Crown Timber Act. The transactions were criticized in a subsequent inquiry.

In 1921, he left Shevlin-Clarke and founded J.A. Mathieu Limited, which set up a mill at Rainy Lake. The company opened another sawmill in 1945 at Sapawe Lake, near Atikokan. He was instrumental in pioneering the use of mechanized equipment in the woods (while other firms were still relying mainly on horses), as well as in using aircraft. After his death, the company was acquired by Domtar.

He set up an educational foundation to provide financial assistance for students from the area, for which he was honoured in 1958 by the Ontario Secondary School Teachers Federation. Mathieu also established a wildlife reserve and help fund community projects in the region. During his time in the provincial assembly, he helped promote the development of roads to encourage settlement in the district. He also served as President of the Northern Pine Manufacturers Association for 22 years.

== Bibliography ==
- Gillis, R. Peter; Roach, Thomas R. (1986). Lost Initiatives: Canada's Forest Industries, Forest Policy, and Forest Conservation. Westport: Greenwood Press. p. 103. ISBN 0-313-25415-X. ISSN 0084-9235.
- Nelles, H.V. (2005). Politics of Development: Forests, Mines, and Hydro-Electric Power in Ontario, 1849–1941 (2nd ed.). McGill-Queen's University Press. ISBN 0-7735-2758-3.
