= Eric Melillo =

Canadian politician (born 1998)

Eric Melillo MP
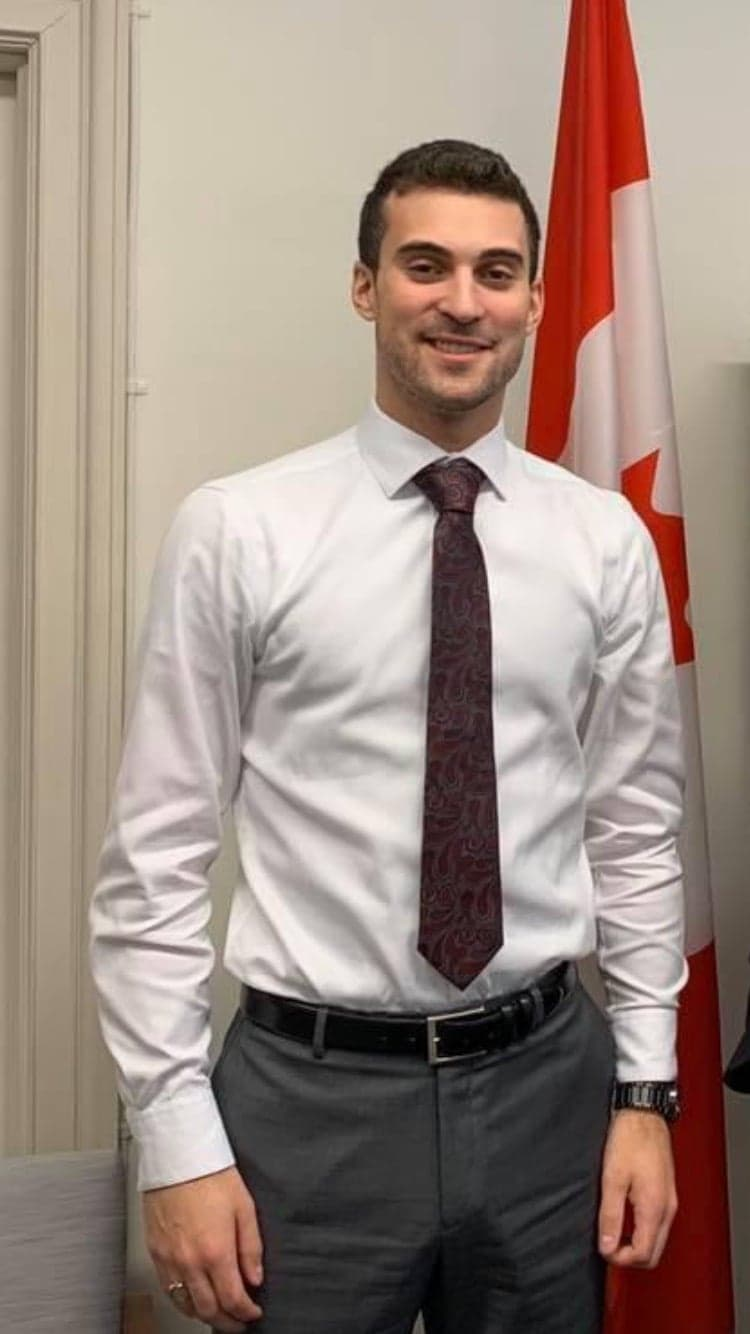
- Melillo in 2019

Member of Parliament for Kenora—Kiiwetinoong Kenora (2019–2025)
- Incumbent
- Assumed office October 21, 2019
- Preceded by: Bob Nault

Personal details
- Born: March 27, 1998 (age 28) Kenora, Ontario, Canada
- Party: Conservative Party of Canada
- Relatives: Natalie Sourisseau (cousin)
- Education: Lakehead University (BA)

Eric Melillo MP (born March 27, 1998) is a Canadian politician who was elected to represent the riding of Kenora in the House of Commons of Canada in the 2019 Canadian federal election.

Having been elected to Parliament at age 21, Melillo was the youngest member of the 43rd and 44th parliaments. He was the first Gen Z MP to be elected to the House.

== Background ==
Melillo graduated from Beaver Brae Secondary School where he showed political aspirations as a high-school student. Prior to election, he studied economics at Lakehead University, worked for a non-partisan think tank in Thunder Bay (Northern Policy Institute) conducting policy analysis, served as an associate for a business consulting firm, and worked as the campaign manager for Kenora—Rainy River MPP Greg Rickford.

== Career ==
=== 43rd Parliament ===
In December 2019, Melillo was appointed the Conservative Party's Deputy Shadow Minister for Diversity and Inclusion and Youth, and Economic Development Initiative for Northern Ontario.

Prior to the second session of the 43rd Parliament, Melillo was named to Erin O'Toole's Shadow Cabinet as the Shadow Minister for Northern Affairs and Economic Development Initiative for Northern Ontario. Melillo served on the Natural Resources and the Indigenous and Northern Affairs standing committees during the 43rd Parliament.

In his first term, he developed a reputation for his attention to constituency work that led to local popularity. He was re-elected at the 2021 Canadian federal election.

=== 44th Parliament ===
After the 2021 election, Melillo remained in the Conservative Shadow Cabinet and was appointed to the Natural Resources Committee.

On March 15, 2022 Melillo was listed among 313 Canadians banned from entering Russia. The announcement came after Ukrainian President Volodymyr Zelenskyy addressed the House of Commons in midst of the Russian invasion of Ukraine.

During the 2022 Conservative Party of Canada leadership election, Melilo endorsed Scott Aitchison.

=== 45th Parliament ===
After the 2025 general election, Melillo remained in the Conservative Shadow Cabinet as the Shadow Minister for Federal Economic Development Agency for Northern Ontario and was appointed to the Standing Committee on Indigenous and Northern Affairs.

== Electoral record ==
2025 Canadian federal election: Kenora—Kiiwetinoong
| Party | Candidate | Votes | % | ±% | Expenditures |
|---|---|---|---|---|---|
| Conservative | Eric Melillo | 13,109 | 48.75 | +5.43 | $91,212.63 |
| Liberal | Charles Fox | 9,454 | 35.16 | +15.31 | none listed |
| New Democratic | Tania Cameron | 3,698 | 13.75 | –15.39 | $57,478.43 |
| Green | Jon Hobbs | 286 | 1.06 | –0.33 | $1,185.36 |
| People's | Bryce Desjarlais | 204 | 0.76 | –5.55 | $0.00 |
| Independent | Kelvin Boucher-Chicago | 141 | 0.52 | N/A | $1,160.00 |
| Total valid votes/expense limit | | 26,892 | 99.36 | — | $139,127.33 |
| Total rejected ballots | | 174 | 0.64 | | |
| Turnout | | 27,066 | 60.66 | +3.06 | |
| Eligible voters | | 44,617 | | | |
| Conservative notional hold | | Swing | | –4.94 | |
Source: Elections Canada

2021 Canadian federal election: Kenora
| Party | Candidate | Votes | % | ±% | Expenditures |
|---|---|---|---|---|---|
| Conservative | Eric Melillo | 11,103 | 42.6 | +8.5 | $76,445.84 |
| New Democratic | Janine Seymour | 7,802 | 29.9 | +1.4 | $53,646.32 |
| Liberal | David Bruno | 5,190 | 19.9 | -10.1 | $42,652.01 |
| People's | Craig Martin | 1,625 | 6.2 | +4.8 | $6,563.10 |
| Green | Remi Rheault | 364 | 1.4 | -4.0 | $2,974.40 |
| Total valid votes | | 26,083 | 99.6 | | |
| Total rejected ballots | | 118 | 0.4 | | |
| Turnout | | 26,201 | 57.6 | | |
| Eligible voters | | 45,500 | | | |
| Conservative hold | | Swing | | +3.6 | |
Source: Elections Canada

2019 Canadian federal election: Kenora
| Party | Candidate | Votes | % | ±% |
|---|---|---|---|---|
| Conservative | Eric Melillo | 9,313 | 34.1 | +5.64 |
| Liberal | Bob Nault | 8,188 | 30.0 | -5.50 |
| New Democratic | Rudy Turtle | 7,781 | 28.5 | -5.38 |
| Green | Kirsi Ralko | 1,475 | 5.4 | +3.77 |
| People's | Michael Di Pasquale | 382 | 1.4 | - |
| Independent | Kelvin Boucher-Chicago | 165 | 0.6 | +0.07 |
| Total valid votes | | 27,304 | 100.00 | |
| Conservative gain from Liberal | | Swing | | +9.04 |
