= Bob Nault =

Canadian politician (born 1955)

The Honourable Bob Nault PC
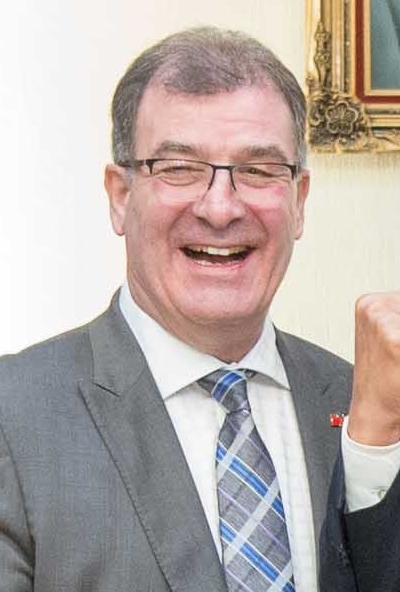

Member of the Canadian Parliament for Kenora
- In office October 19, 2015 – September 11, 2019
- Preceded by: Greg Rickford
- Succeeded by: Eric Melillo

Member of the Canadian Parliament for Kenora—Rainy River
- In office November 21, 1988 – June 28, 2004
- Preceded by: John Edmund Parry
- Succeeded by: District was abolished in 2003

Chairman of the Standing Committee on Foreign Affairs and International Development
- In office February 4, 2016 – September 11, 2019
- Preceded by: Dean Allison

Minister of Indian Affairs and Northern Development
- In office August 3, 1999 – December 11, 2003
- Preceded by: Jane Stewart
- Succeeded by: Andy Mitchell

Personal details
- Born: Robert Daniel Nault; November 9, 1955 (age 70) Ste. Anne, Manitoba, Canada
- Party: Liberal
- Spouse: Lana Rae Jardine (m. 1987)
- Children: two
- Education: University of Alberta, University of Winnipeg
- Profession: Canadian Pacific Railway conductor

Robert Daniel Nault PC (born November 9, 1955) is a Canadian politician.

A member of the Liberal Party of Canada, Nault began his career as city councillor for Kenora City Council. He was first elected to the House of Commons as the representative for Kenora—Rainy River in 1988, beating NDP incumbent John Parry. Following the 1988 election, Nault ran successfully in the 1993,1997, and 2000 federal elections.

Nault also served as Minister of Indian Affairs and Northern Development in the cabinet of Jean Chrétien from 1999 to 2003. While in cabinet, he introduced the First Nations Governance Act, a program of reform and financial accountability measures for First Nations.

In February 2004, he announced he would leave politics to set up a consulting business, Western Frontier International Group. He did not seek re-election in the 2004 election.

In January 2015, Nault announced his intention to seek the Liberal Party of Canada nomination for Kenora, which includes nearly all of his old riding, in the 2015 federal election scheduled for October 19. On May 31, 2015, Nault was nominated as the party's candidate. In the ensuing election, he edged out former provincial NDP leader Howard Hampton, who had represented the area provincially from 1987 to 2011, by only 2% to return to Parliament after a 12-year absence. Incumbent Conservative and cabinet minister Greg Rickford was pushed into third place.

In February 2016, Nault was elected Chair by committee members of the Foreign Affairs and International Development Committee.

He was defeated in the 2019 federal election.

== Electoral record ==
2019 Canadian federal election: Kenora
Party	Candidate	Votes	%	±%
Conservative	Eric Melillo	9,313	34.1	+5.64
Liberal	Bob Nault	8,188	30.0	-5.50
New Democratic	Rudy Turtle	7,781	28.5	-5.38
Green	Kirsi Ralko	1,475	5.4	+3.77
People's	Michael Di Pasquale	382	1.4	-
Independent	Kelvin Boucher-Chicago	165	0.6	+0.07
Total valid votes		27,304	100.00	
Conservative gain from Liberal		Swing		+9.04

2015 Canadian federal election: Kenora
Party	Candidate	Votes	%
Liberal	Bob Nault	10,898	35.39
New Democratic	Howard Hampton	10,379	33.71
Conservative	Greg Rickford	8,760	28.45
Green	Ember C. McKilop	501	1.63
Independent	Kelvin Boucher-Chicago	162	0.53
Total valid votes		30,791	100.00

2000 Canadian federal election: Kenora—Rainy River
Party	Candidate	Votes	%
Liberal	Bob Nault	14,416	45.21
Alliance	Ed Prefontaine	9,125	28.62
New Democratic	Susan Barclay	6,868	21.54
Progressive Conservative	Brian Barrett	1,479	4.63
Total valid votes		31,885	100.00
Total rejected ballots		134	–
Turnout		32,019	58.44
Eligible voters		54,792	

1997 Canadian federal election: Kenora—Rainy River
Party	Candidate	Votes	%
Liberal	Bob Nault	14,084	41.93
Reform	Ken Hyatt	9,782	29.12
New Democratic	Ruth Bergman	6,922	20.61
Progressive Conservative	Gordon Lee	2,799	8.33
Total valid votes		33,587	100.00
Total rejected ballots		189	–
Turnout		33,776	60.57
Eligible voters		55,764	

1993 Canadian federal election: Kenora—Rainy River
Party	Candidate	Votes	%
Liberal	Bob Nault	22,157	64.84
Reform	Mel Fisher	7,094	20.57
New Democratic	Peter Kirby	2,194	6.35
Progressive Conservative	George Hainsworth	2,062	6.00
National	Harold Rowe	698	0.02
Not affiliated	April I. McCormick	284	0.01
Turnout		34,559	–

1988 Canadian federal election: Kenora—Rainy River
Party	Candidate	Votes	%
Liberal	Bob Nault	13,313	38.28
New Democratic	John Perry	12,102	34.79
Progressive Conservative	Dick Motlong	7,496	21.55
Christian Heritage	Ed Carlson	1,477	4.25
Turnout		34,782	–

26th Canadian Ministry (1993–2003) – Cabinet of Jean Chrétien
Cabinet post (1)
Predecessor	Office	Successor
Jane Stewart	Minister of Indian Affairs and Northern Development; 1999–2003	Andy Mitchell
