= Rainy River (electoral district) =

Provincial electoral district in Ontario, Canada (1908-99)

Rainy River was a provincial electoral district in the Canadian province of Ontario, which returned one member to the Legislative Assembly of Ontario from 1908 to 1999.

The district was created in 1908 from part of the former district of Port Arthur and Rainy River, and comprised much of the Rainy River District. It remained in service until 1999, when it was merged into Kenora—Rainy River as part of the Mike Harris government's reforms of the provincial legislature, which reduced the number of electoral districts in the province from 130 to 103. For much of its history, it was the smallest electoral district in the entire province by population.

== Members of Provincial Parliament ==
Rainy River
Assembly	Years	Member	Party
Riding created from Port Arthur and Rainy River
12th	1908–1911	William Alfred Preston	Conservative
13th	1911–1914	James Arthur Mathieu	Liberal–Conservative
14th	1914–1919	James Arthur Mathieu	Conservative
15th	1919–1923	James Arthur Mathieu	Conservative
16th	1923–1926	John Fullarton Callan	Labour
17th	1926–1929	James Arthur Mathieu	Conservative
18th	1929–1934	William Herbert Elliott	Independent Conservative
19th	1934–1937	Randolph George Croome	Liberal
20th	1937–1943	Randolph George Croome	Liberal
21st	1943–1945	George Edward Lockhart	Co-operative Commonwealth
22nd	1945–1948	James Newman	Liberal–Labour
23rd	1948–1951	James Newman	Liberal–Labour
24th	1951–1955	Bill Noden	Progressive Conservative
25th	1955–1959	Bill Noden	Progressive Conservative
26th	1959–1963	Bill Noden	Progressive Conservative
27th	1963–1967	Bill Noden	Progressive Conservative
28th	1967–1971	Pat Reid	Liberal
29th	1971–1975	Pat Reid	Liberal
30th	1975–1977	Pat Reid	Liberal
31st	1977–1981	Pat Reid	Liberal
32nd	1981–1984	Pat Reid	Liberal
33rd	1985–1987	Jack Pierce	Progressive Conservative
34th	1987–1990	Howard Hampton	New Democratic
35th	1990–1995	Howard Hampton	New Democratic
36th	1995–1999	Howard Hampton	New Democratic
Riding merged into Kenora—Rainy River

== Election results ==
1995 Ontario general election
Party	Candidate	Votes	%	±%
New Democratic	Howard Hampton	4,912	39.93	–21.54
Progressive Conservative	Lynn Beyak	4,707	38.26	+30.15
Liberal	Darren W.E. Brown	2,683	21.81	–8.60
Total valid votes		12,302	99.09	
Total rejected, unmarked and declined ballots		113	0.91	+0.18
Turnout		12,415	63.98	–2.37
Eligible voters		19,406		
New Democratic hold		Swing		–25.84
Source: Elections Ontario

1990 Ontario general election
Party	Candidate	Votes	%	±%
New Democratic	Howard Hampton	7,838	61.47	+20.92
Liberal	Dennis W. Brown	3,878	30.41	–3.50
Progressive Conservative	Bob Davidson	1,035	8.12	–17.42
Total valid votes		12,751	99.27	
Total rejected, unmarked and declined ballots		94	0.73	+0.48
Turnout		12,845	66.34	–5.10
Eligible voters		19,362		
New Democratic hold		Swing		+12.21
Source: Elections Ontario

1987 Ontario general election
Party	Candidate	Votes	%	±%
New Democratic	Howard Hampton	5,538	40.55	+3.17
Liberal	Dan Pierroz	4,631	33.91	+10.86
Progressive Conservative	Jack Pierce	3,487	25.53	–14.03
Total valid votes		13,656	99.74	
Total rejected ballots		35	0.26	+0.01
Turnout		13,691	71.44	+4.24
Eligible voters		19,165		
New Democratic gain from Progressive Conservative		Swing		+8.60
Source: Elections Ontario

1985 Ontario general election
Party	Candidate	Votes	%	±%
Progressive Conservative	Jack Pierce	5,053	39.56	+2.39
New Democratic	Howard Hampton	4,775	37.39	+15.54
Liberal	Ron W. King	2,944	23.05	–17.94
Total valid votes		12,772	99.75	
Total rejected ballots		32	0.25	+0.02
Turnout		12,804	67.20	+5.73
Eligible voters		19,055		
Progressive Conservative gain from Liberal		Swing		+10.17
Source: Elections Ontario

1981 Ontario general election
Party	Candidate	Votes	%	±%
Liberal	T. Patrick Reid	4,575	40.99	–4.92
Progressive Conservative	Jack Pierce	4,149	37.17	+9.05
New Democratic	Alan M. Tibbetts	2,438	21.84	–4.13
Total valid votes		11,162	99.77	
Total rejected ballots		26	0.23	–0.28
Turnout		11,188	61.47	–2.30
Eligible voters		18,202		
Liberal hold		Swing		–6.98
Source: Elections Ontario

1977 Ontario general election
Party	Candidate	Votes	%	±%
Liberal	T. Patrick Reid	5,335	45.90	–5.68
Progressive Conservative	Gordon Thomson	3,268	28.12	–0.20
New Democratic	Howard Hampton	3,019	25.98	+5.88
Total valid votes		11,622	99.49	
Total rejected ballots		60	0.51	+0.16
Turnout		11,682	63.77	–0.93
Eligible voters		18,320		
Liberal hold		Swing		–2.74
Source: Elections Ontario

1975 Ontario general election
Party	Candidate	Votes	%	±%
Liberal–Labour	T. Patrick Reid	5,892	51.58	+1.59
Progressive Conservative	Allan V. Avis	3,235	28.32	+10.28
New Democratic	Marg Lichtenstein	2,295	20.09	–11.87
Total valid votes		11,422	99.64	
Total rejected ballots		41	0.36	–0.41
Turnout		11,463	64.70	–7.60
Eligible voters		17,718		
Liberal–Labour hold		Swing		–4.34
Source: Elections Ontario

1971 Ontario general election
Party	Candidate	Votes	%	±%
Liberal	T. Patrick Reid	6,115	50.00	+15.70
New Democratic	Harvey H. Moats	3,909	31.96	+0.10
Progressive Conservative	Everett E. Doman	2,207	18.04	–15.80
Total valid votes		12,231	99.23	
Total rejected ballots		95	0.77	–0.09
Turnout		12,326	72.30	+8.37
Eligible voters		17,048		
Liberal hold		Swing		+7.80
Source: Elections Ontario

1967 Ontario general election
Party	Candidate	Votes	%	±%
Liberal–Labour	T. Patrick Reid	3,130	34.29	+3.37
Progressive Conservative	John R. McVey	3,089	33.84	–20.21
New Democratic	George Edward Lockhart	2,908	31.86	+16.84
Total valid votes		9,127	99.14	
Total rejected ballots		79	0.86	+0.27
Turnout		9,206	63.93	–3.11
Eligible voters		14,400		
Liberal–Labour gain from Progressive Conservative		Swing		+11.79
Source: Elections Ontario

1963 Ontario general election
Party	Candidate	Votes	%	±%
Progressive Conservative	Bill Noden	4,568	54.06	+1.49
Liberal	G. Larry Richardson	2,613	30.92	+11.55
New Democratic	Owen Lindsay	1,269	15.02	–13.04
Total valid votes		8,450	99.41	
Total rejected ballots		50	0.59	–0.15
Turnout		8,500	67.05	–5.22
Eligible voters		12,678		
Progressive Conservative hold		Swing		–5.03
Source: Elections Ontario

1959 Ontario general election
Party	Candidate	Votes	%	±%
Progressive Conservative	Bill Noden	4,896	52.57	–7.51
Co-operative Commonwealth	Owen Lindsay	2,613	28.06	+12.75
Liberal	Jack McLaren	1,804	19.37	–
Total valid votes		9,313	99.26	
Total rejected ballots		69	0.74	–0.42
Turnout		9,382	72.26	+4.40
Eligible voters		12,983		
Progressive Conservative hold		Swing		–10.13
Source: Elections Ontario

1955 Ontario general election
Party	Candidate	Votes	%	±%
Progressive Conservative	Bill Noden	4,977	60.08	+16.04
Liberal–Labour	Roy L. Barron	2,039	24.61	–13.73
Co-operative Commonwealth	James C. Hill	1,268	15.31	–2.32
Total valid votes		8,284	98.84	
Total rejected ballots		97	1.16	+0.22
Turnout		8,381	67.86	–4.85
Eligible voters		12,350		
Progressive Conservative hold		Swing		+14.88
Source: Elections Ontario

1951 Ontario general election
Party	Candidate	Votes	%	±%
Progressive Conservative	Bill Noden	3,633	44.04	+0.36
Liberal–Labour	James Newman	3,163	38.34	–17.98
Co-operative Commonwealth	George Edward Lockhart	1,454	17.62	–
Total valid votes		8,250	99.06	
Total rejected ballots		78	0.94	+0.26
Turnout		8,328	72.71	+7.01
Eligible voters		11,454		
Progressive Conservative gain from Liberal–Labour		Swing		+9.17
Source: Elections Ontario

1948 Ontario general election
Party	Candidate	Votes	%	±%
Liberal–Labour	James Newman	3,969	56.32	+21.73
Progressive Conservative	Bill Noden	3,078	43.68	+12.45
Total valid votes		7,047	99.32	
Total rejected ballots		48	0.68	–0.07
Turnout		7,095	65.70	–11.18
Eligible voters		10,799		
Liberal–Labour hold		Swing		+4.64
Source: Elections Ontario

1945 Ontario general election
Party	Candidate	Votes	%	±%
Liberal–Labour	James Newman	2,583	34.59	+3.91
Progressive Conservative	Russell O. Wilkes	2,332	31.23	+1.28
Co-operative Commonwealth	George Edward Lockhart	2,186	29.28	–10.09
Labor–Progressive	John J. Anderson	366	4.90	–
Total valid votes		7,467	99.26	
Total rejected ballots		56	0.74	–0.01
Turnout		7,523	76.88	+8.45
Eligible voters		9,785		
Liberal–Labour gain from Co-operative Commonwealth		Swing		+7.00
Source: Elections Ontario

1943 Ontario general election
Party	Candidate	Votes	%	±%
Co-operative Commonwealth	George Edward Lockhart	2,600	39.37	+21.06
Liberal	John Mercer Reid	2,026	30.68	–19.77
Progressive Conservative	Albert V. Holmes	1,978	29.95	–1.28
Total valid votes		6,604	99.25	
Total rejected ballots		50	0.75	–0.12
Turnout		6,654	68.43	–5.04
Eligible voters		9,724		
Co-operative Commonwealth gain from Liberal		Swing		+11.17
Source: Elections Ontario

1937 Ontario general election
Party	Candidate	Votes	%	±%
Liberal	Randolph George Croome	3,460	50.45	–17.81
Conservative	William David Douglas	2,142	31.23	–0.51
Co-operative Commonwealth	Bert Forsberg	1,256	18.31	–
Total valid votes		6,858	99.13	
Total rejected ballots		60	0.87	–0.05
Turnout		6,918	73.47	–2.65
Eligible voters		9,416		
Liberal hold		Swing		–8.65
Source: Elections Ontario

1934 Ontario general election
Party	Candidate	Votes	%	±%
Liberal	Randolph George Croome	4,725	68.26	–
Conservative	William David Douglas	2,197	31.74	–16.30
Total valid votes		6,922	99.08	
Total rejected ballots		64	0.92	–0.15
Turnout		6,986	76.13	–1.92
Eligible voters		9,177		
Liberal gain from Independent Conservative		Swing		+8.15
Source: Elections Ontario

1929 Ontario general election
Party	Candidate	Votes	%	±%
Independent Conservative	William Herbert Elliott	3,142	51.96	–
Conservative	James Arthur Mathieu	2,905	48.04	–0.14
Total valid votes		6,047	98.94	
Total rejected ballots		65	1.06	+0.55
Turnout		6,112	78.05	+22.16
Eligible voters		7,831		
Independent Conservative gain from Conservative		Swing		+0.07
Source: Elections Ontario

1926 Ontario general election
Party	Candidate	Votes	%	±%
Conservative	James Arthur Mathieu	2,230	48.18	+9.10
Independent Liberal	Edward Tompkins	1,453	31.40	–
Independent Conservative	Richard Charles Langstaff	945	20.42	–
Total valid votes		4,628	99.48	
Total rejected ballots		24	0.52	–0.14
Turnout		4,652	55.89	–10.05
Eligible voters		8,323		
Conservative gain from Labour		Swing		+4.55
Source: Elections Ontario

1923 Ontario general election
Party	Candidate	Votes	%	±%
Labour	John Fullarton Callan	1,738	42.72	–
Conservative	James Arthur Mathieu	1,590	39.09	–0.91
Liberal	Edward J. Callaghan	740	18.19	–11.89
Total valid votes		4,068	99.34	
Total rejected ballots		27	0.66	–0.34
Turnout		4,095	65.94	+2.42
Eligible voters		6,210		
Labour gain from Conservative		Swing		+5.95
Source: Elections Ontario

1919 Ontario general election
Party	Candidate	Votes	%	±%
Conservative	James Arthur Mathieu	1,420	40.00	–20.20
Liberal	Edward J. Callaghan	1,068	30.08	–9.71
United Farmers	John F. Barber	1,062	29.92	–
Total valid votes		3,550	99.00	
Total rejected ballots		36	1.00	–0.39
Turnout		3,586	63.53	+10.09
Eligible voters		5,645		
Conservative hold		Swing		–5.24
Source: Elections Ontario

1914 Ontario general election
Party	Candidate	Votes	%	±%
Conservative	James Arthur Mathieu	1,195	60.20	+17.45
Liberal	Richard Charles Langstaff	790	39.80	–
Total valid votes		1,985	98.61	
Total rejected ballots		28	1.39	+0.34
Turnout		2,013	53.44	–0.70
Eligible voters		3,767		
Conservative gain from Liberal–Conservative		Swing		+8.72
Source: Elections Ontario

1911 Ontario general election
Party	Candidate	Votes	%	±%
Liberal–Conservative	James Arthur Mathieu	1,130	57.24	–
Conservative	William Alfred Preston	844	42.76	–12.19
Total valid votes		1,974	98.95	
Total rejected ballots		21	1.05	–0.16
Turnout		1,995	54.14	–24.51
Eligible voters		3,685		
Liberal–Conservative gain from Conservative		Swing		–
Source: Elections Ontario

1908 Ontario general election
Party	Candidate	Votes	%
Conservative	William Alfred Preston	944	54.95
Liberal	Hugh W. Kennedy	774	45.05
Total valid votes		1,718	98.79
Total rejected ballots		21	1.21
Turnout		1,739	78.65
Eligible voters		2,211	
Conservative pickup new district.			
Source: Elections Ontario
