= Hugh McKinnon =

Canadian politician

Member of Parliament for Kenora—Rainy River
- In office September 1934 – April 1944
- Preceded by: Peter Heenan
- Succeeded by: William Moore Benidickson

Personal details
- Born: Hugh Bathgate McKinnon; 21 April 1885 Kenora, Ontario, Canada
- Died: 10 April 1944 (aged 58) Ottawa, Ontario, Canada
- Party: Liberal
- Spouse(s): DeGagné m. 25 January 1911
- Profession: locomotive engineer

Hugh Bathgate McKinnon (21 April 1885 – 10 April 1944) was a Liberal party member of the House of Commons of Canada. He was born in Kenora, Ontario and became a locomotive engineer.

He joined the Canadian Pacific Railway as an engine wiper in 1901 and by age 21 became one of the youngest railroad engineers of that time.

McKinnon was an unsuccessful provincial Liberal-Labour candidate at the Kenora riding in the 1926 Ontario election.

He was first elected to Parliament at the Kenora—Rainy River federal riding in a by-election on 24 September 1934 then re-elected there in 1935 and 1940.

McKinnon died at his Ottawa residence on 10 April 1944, before completing his term in the 19th Canadian Parliament. He was survived by seven children besides his wife.
