= Sarah Campbell (politician) =

Canadian politician

Member of the Ontario Provincial Parliament for Kenora—Rainy River
- In office October 6, 2011 – June 7, 2018
- Preceded by: Howard Hampton
- Succeeded by: Greg Rickford

Personal details
- Born: July 19, 1982 (age 44) Atikokan, Ontario, Canada
- Party: Ontario New Democratic
- Occupation: Executive assistant
- Website: www.sarahcampbellmpp.ca

Sarah Jane Campbell (born July 19, 1982) is a politician in Ontario, Canada. She was a New Democratic member of the Legislative Assembly of Ontario who represented the riding of Kenora—Rainy River from 2011 to 2018.

== Background ==
Campbell was born in Atikokan, and raised in Atikokan, Thunder Bay and Ear Falls, where her father owns a tourist camp. Campbell lives in Vermilion Bay with her family. She was the riding assistant to former NDP leader Howard Hampton.

== Politics ==
Campbell ran in the 2011 provincial election as the New Democratic candidate in the riding of Kenora—Rainy River. She defeated Progressive Conservative candidate Rod McKay by 2,642 votes. She was re-elected in the 2014 provincial election defeating PC candidate Randy Nickle by 6,984 votes.

She was the party's critic for women's issues and aboriginal affairs.

In November 2017, Campbell announced that she would not seek a third term and would be leaving politics.

== Election results ==
2014 Ontario general election
Party	Candidate	Votes	%	±%
New Democratic	Sarah Campbell	12,889	55.65	+6.02
Progressive Conservative	Randy Nickle	5,905	25.49	-12.16
Liberal	Anthony Leek	3,652	15.77	+5.79
Green	Tim McKillop	711	3.07	+1.30
Total valid votes		23,157	100.00	
New Democratic hold		Swing		+9.02
Source:Elections Ontario

2011 Ontario general election
Party	Candidate	Votes	%	±%
New Democratic	Sarah Campbell	10,949	49.62	-11.00
Progressive Conservative	Rod McKay	8,307	37.65	+25.95
Liberal	Anthony Leek	2,202	9.98	-14.44
Green	Jo Jo Holiday	391	1.77	-1.49
Northern Ontario Heritage	Charmaine Romaniuk	216	0.98	
Total valid votes		22,065	100.00	
Total rejected, unmarked and declined ballots		65	0.29	
Turnout		22,130	45.75	
Eligible voters		48,369		
New Democratic hold		Swing		-18.48
Source: Elections Ontario
