= James Newman (Canadian politician) =

Canadian politician

Ontario MPP
- In office 1945–1951
- Preceded by: George Edward Lockhart
- Succeeded by: Bill Noden
- Constituency: Rainy River

Personal details
- Born: June 19, 1903; Cartwright, Manitoba
- Died: February 13, 1963 (aged 59)
- Political party: Liberal-Labour
- Spouse: Birdella Sweeney
- Occupation: Merchant

James Melvin Newman (June 19, 1903 – February 13, 1963) was an Ontario merchant and political figure. He represented Rainy River in the Legislative Assembly of Ontario as a Liberal-Labour member from 1945 to 1951.

He was born in Cartwright, Manitoba, the son of James Newman, and educated there. In 1928, he married Birdella Sweeney. Newman was an automobile dealer and farm implement distributor. He served on the town council for Fort Frances. He was also a member of the Masons and a Shriner.
