= Jack Pierce (politician) =

Canadian politician (1937–2022)

Ontario MPP
- In office 1985–1987
- Preceded by: Pat Reid
- Succeeded by: Howard Hampton
- Constituency: Rainy River

Personal details
- Born: May 24, 1937 Fort Frances, Ontario, Canada
- Died: November 22, 2022 (aged 85) Atikokan, Ontario, Canada
- Party: Progressive Conservative
- Occupation: Electrician

Franklin "Jack" Pierce (May 24, 1937 – November 22, 2022) was a politician in Ontario, Canada. He was a Progressive Conservative member of the Legislative Assembly of Ontario from 1985 to 1987 who represented the northern Ontario riding of Rainy River.

== Background ==
Pierce was born in Fort Frances, Ontario, and educated in the area. He worked as an electrician.

== Politics ==
Pierce served as reeve and councillor for Atikokan Township.

He sought election to the Ontario legislature for Rainy River in the 1981 provincial election but lost to Pat Reid of the Liberal Party by 426 votes.

He supported Frank Miller in his bid for party leader in early 1985.

Pierce tried again in the 1985 election. During the election campaign he criticized local Indians for expecting more "giveaways and handouts". He said he would not campaign on reserves as he received less than 10% of the votes from those constituencies. Some Conservative supporters were less sanguine about Pierce's candidacy as they believed his beliefs were too far to the right. Despite this, Pierce defeated New Democratic Party candidate Howard Hampton by 278 votes. The Progressive Conservatives won a tenuous minority government in this election, but were defeated in the legislature in June 1985 by a motion of non-confidence.

In November 1985, he supported Larry Grossman for party leader after Miller stepped down. Pierce served for the next two years as a member of the opposition. He finished third in the 1987 election, losing to Howard Hampton by 2,051 votes.

Pierce died in Atikokan on November 22, 2022.
