= T. Patrick Reid =

Canadian politician

Pat Reid

Ontario MPP
- In office 1967–1984
- Preceded by: Bill Noden
- Succeeded by: Jack Pierce
- Constituency: Rainy River

Personal details
- Born: January 2, 1943 (age 83) Fort Frances, Ontario
- Party: Liberal-Labour
- Spouse: Maureen
- Relations: John Reid (brother)
- Children: 2
- Occupation: Mining executive

Thomas Patrick Reid (born January 2, 1943) is a businessman and former politician in Ontario, Canada. He was a Liberal-Labour member of the Legislative Assembly of Ontario from 1967 to 1984 who represented the northern Ontario riding of Rainy River. He served as president of the Ontario Mining Association from 1987 to 2004 and has served on the boards of several mining companies.

== Background ==
Reid was born in Fort Frances, Ontario, and educated in Atikokan and at the University of Manitoba. He is married to Maureen and together they have two daughters, Aislinn and Kyla. His older brother, John Reid was a Liberal member of federal parliament from 1965 to 1984.

== Politics ==
Reid ran in the 1967 provincial election as the Liberal candidate in the riding of Rainy River. He defeated Progressive Conservative Party of Ontario candidate John McKey by 41 votes. Reid identified himself as a Liberal-Labour candidate, and caucused with the Ontario Liberal Party.

Reid was re-elected by comfortable margins in 1971, 1975 and 1977, and defeated Progressive Conservative candidate Jack Pierce by 426 votes in 1981. He was the last Member of Provincial Parliament (MPP) in Ontario to be elected under the "Liberal-Labour" banner, although the distinction from the official Liberal Party was mostly symbolic by this stage. In some elections, he campaigned as a Liberal candidate. Reid was also the only Liberal MPP from Northern Ontario in the early 1980s.

In 1976, he was elected president of the Ontario Liberal Party.

== Later life ==
Reid resigned from the legislature in November 1984 to become executive director of the Ontario Mining Association. He was promoted to president of the OMA in 1987, and retained this position until 2004. He was instrumental in creating "Ontario Mining Week" to draw attention to the industry among the public, industry and government.

As of 2006, he serves as chairman of Probe Mines Limited, and is a director of such companies as Canstar Resources Inc., Valencia Ventures Inc. and Gammon Lake Resources Inc. Reid has also served on the executive committee of the Toronto Branch of the Canadian Institute of Mining and Metallurgy.
