= George Edward Lockhart =

Canadian politician and farmer

Ontario MPP
- In office 1943–1945
- Preceded by: Randolph George Croome
- Succeeded by: James Newman
- Constituency: Rainy River

Personal details
- Born: February 4, 1902; Stratton, Ontario
- Died: May 6, 1991 (aged 89)
- Political party: Co-operative Commonwealth Federation
- Spouse: Florence M. Gamsby (m. 1927)
- Occupation: Merchant

George Edward Lockhart (February 4, 1902 – May 6, 1991) was a farmer and politician in Ontario, Canada. He represented Rainy River in the Legislative Assembly of Ontario from 1943 to 1945 as a Co-operative Commonwealth Federation (CCF) member.

The son of Edward Albert Lockhart and Sarah Maria Williams, he was born in Stratton and was educated there. In 1927, Lockhart married Florence M. Gamsby. He was a director for a local creamery and also served as its president.
