= Port Arthur and Kenora =

Former federal electoral district in Ontario, Canada

Ontario electoral district

Defunct federal electoral district
- Legislature: House of Commons
- District created: 1914
- District abolished: 1924
- First contested: 1917
- Last contested: 1921

Port Arthur and Kenora was a federal electoral district represented in the House of Commons of Canada from 1917 to 1925. It was located in the province of Ontario. This riding was created in 1914 from parts of Thunder Bay and Rainy River riding.

It consisted of the territorial districts of Thunder Bay, Kenora and Rainy River, excluding parts included in Fort William and Rainy River, and of the district of Patricia.

The electoral district was abolished in 1924 when it was redistributed between Kenora—Rainy River and Port Arthur—Thunder Bay ridings.

== Members of Parliament ==
This riding has elected the following members of Parliament:

Parliament	Years	Member	Party
Riding created from Thunder Bay and Rainy River
13th	1917–1921	Francis Henry Keefer	Government (Unionist)
14th	1921–1925	Dougald Kennedy	Progressive
Riding dissolved into Kenora—Rainy River and Port Arthur—Thunder Bay

== Election history ==
1917 Canadian federal election: Port Arthur and Kenora
Party	Candidate	Votes
Government	Francis Henry Keefer	5,990
Opposition	James Asher Dunbar	2,476

1921 Canadian federal election: Port Arthur and Kenora
Party	Candidate	Votes
Progressive	Dougald Kennedy	3,681
Conservative	Francis Henry Keefer	3,627
Liberal	Alexander Jarvis McComber	3,419

== See also ==
- List of Canadian electoral districts
- Historical federal electoral districts of Canada
