= Thunder Bay and Rainy River =

Former federal electoral district in Ontario, Canada

Ontario electoral district

Defunct federal electoral district
- Legislature: House of Commons
- District created: 1903
- District abolished: 1914
- First contested: 1904
- Last contested: 1911

Thunder Bay and Rainy River was a federal electoral district represented in the House of Commons of Canada from 1904 to 1917. It was located in the northwestern part of the province of Ontario. This riding was created in 1903 from parts of Algoma riding.

It consisted of the territorial districts of Thunder Bay and Rainy River.

The electoral district was abolished in 1914 when it was redistributed between Fort William and Rainy River and Port Arthur and Kenora ridings.

== Members of Parliament ==
This riding has elected the following members of Parliament:

Parliament	Years	Member	Party
Riding created from Algoma
10th	1904–1908	James Conmee	Liberal
11th	1908–1911	James Conmee	Liberal
12th	1911–1917	John James Carrick	Conservative
Riding dissolved into Fort William and Rainy River and Port Arthur and Kenora

== Election history ==
1904 Canadian federal election: Thunder Bay and Rainy River
Party	Candidate	Votes	%	±%
Liberal	James Conmee	2,162		
Conservative	George T. Marks	1,734		
Unknown	L. L. Peltier	638		

1908 Canadian federal election: Thunder Bay and Rainy River
Party	Candidate	Votes	%	±%
Liberal	James Conmee	4,562		
Conservative	F. H. Keefer	3,321		
Socialist	Frederick Urry	702		

1911 Canadian federal election: Thunder Bay and Rainy River
Party	Candidate	Votes	%	±%
Conservative	John James Carrick	acclaimed		

== See also ==
- List of Canadian electoral districts
- Historical federal electoral districts of Canada
