= John Edmund Parry =

Canadian politician

Member of the Canadian Parliament for Kenora—Rainy River
- In office September 4, 1984 – November 20, 1988
- Preceded by: John Mercer Reid
- Succeeded by: Bob Nault

Personal details
- Born: February 6, 1946 (age 80) London, England
- Party: New Democratic Party
- Spouse: Jen Chu-Fai (m. 1976)
- Children: two
- Education: University of Western Ontario
- Profession: business consultant

John Edmund Parry (born February 6, 1946) is a Canadian politician. He served in the House of Commons of Canada from 1984 to 1988, as a member of the New Democratic Party.

== History ==
Parry was born in London, England, UK. He was educated at Woodford Green in Essex, England, and at the University of Western Ontario in London, Ontario. Parry has a Master of Business Administration degree, and works as a business consultant. Prior to his election to the House of Commons, he served for six years as mayor of Sioux Lookout in Northern Ontario.

He first campaigned for the House of Commons in the 1979 federal election, and finished a close second against Liberal candidate John M. Reid in Kenora—Rainy River. He ran again in the 1980 election, and lost to Reid a second time by only 366 votes.

Parry was finally elected in Kenora-Rainy River to the House of Commons on his third attempt, in the 1984 election. He defeated Progressive Conservative candidate Al Lugli by 620 votes, while Reid finished third amid a national decline in support of the Liberal Party. The Progressive Conservative Party won a landslide majority government, and Parry served for the next four years as an opposition member. In 1987, Parry was one of three New Democratic Party Members of Parliament (MPs) to heckle American President Ronald Reagan during an address by the president to the Canadian House of Commons (Toronto Star, 6 June 2004).

He was defeated in the 1988 election, losing to Liberal candidate Robert Nault by 1,211 votes.

Parry moved to Manitoba in 1993 (Winnipeg Free Press, 5 September 2000). He sought election to the Winnipeg City Council in 1995, but lost to Al Golden in the St. Vital division. He had previously considered campaigning for Mayor of Winnipeg as a candidate of the organization Winnipeg into the '90s (Winnipeg Free Press, 25 June 1995).

He campaigned as the New Democratic Party candidate in St. Boniface in the 2000 federal election, and finished third against Liberal incumbent Ron Duhamel. He contested the same seat in a 2002 by-election, and placed fourth against new Liberal candidate Raymond Simard.

During the early 1990s, Parry testified before a committee of the Ontario legislature on the state of Canada's constitution. He argued that Canadians were correct to reject the Meech Lake Accord, and made a series of recommendations for a future constitutional accord.

As of 2005, Parry worked as a business consultant in Saskatoon, Saskatchewan, and served as committee chair of both the Third Avenue United Church and the Saskatoon Peace Coalition. He sought the NDP nomination for Saskatoon—Wanuskewin for the 2004 federal election, but lost to Priscilla Settee.

He was nominated as the NDP candidate for Saskatoon—Wanuskewin in 2005, but when the election was delayed until 2006 he resigned his nomination when offered a position in Swift Current, and Jim Maddin was chosen as his replacement.

Parry returned to Saskatoon later in 2006 and embarked on a career managing NGOs. He held three Executive Directorships before retirement in 2010. He was again nominated to contest Saskatoon—Wanuskewin; the general election came in 2011 and he finished second, despite polling the highest vote ever there for the NDP.

== Electoral history ==
Canadian federal by-election, 13 May 2002
Party	Candidate	Votes	%	±%
On Mr. Duhamel being called to the Senate, 15 January 2002
Liberal	Raymond Simard	8,862	42.8	-9.3
Alliance	Denis Simard	4,497	21.7	-1.4
Progressive Conservative	Mike Reilly	3,583	17.3	5.7
New Democratic	John Parry	3,106	15.0	+2.0
Marijuana	Chris Buors	435	2.1	
Christian Heritage	Jean-Paul Kabashiki	210	1.0	
Total valid votes		20,693	100.0	

2000 Canadian federal election: Saint Boniface—Saint Vital
Party	Candidate	Votes	%	±%
Liberal	Ronald J. Duhamel	20,173	52.2	+1.0
Alliance	Joyce M. Chilton	8,962	23.2	+5.2
New Democratic	John Parry	5,026	13.0	-5.0
Progressive Conservative	Mike Reilly	4,505	11.7	-0.7
Total valid votes		38,666	100.0	
