= William Herbert Elliott =

Canadian politician

Ontario MPP
- In office 1929–1934
- Preceded by: John Fullarton Callan
- Succeeded by: Randolph George Croome
- Constituency: Rainy River

Personal details
- Born: July 20, 1872 Peterborough County, Ontario
- Political party: Independent Conservative
- Spouse: Elizabeth Borland (m. 1896)
- Occupation: Businessman

William Herbert Elliott (July 20, 1872 – ?? ) was a businessman and political figure in Ontario. He represented Rainy River in the Legislative Assembly of Ontario from 1929 to 1934 as an Independent-Conservative member.

He was born in Peterborough County, the son of Robert H. Elliott and Sarah Ann Findlay. He was educated in Caledonia. In 1896, he married Elizabeth Borland. Elliott was a director of the Fort Frances Publishing Company and the Big Turtle Mining Company.
