= Bill C-7: First Nations Governance Act =

Failed legislative proposal in Canada

Parliament of Canada
- Long title: Bill C-7: An Act respecting leadership selection, administration and accountability of Indian bands, and to make related amendments to other Acts
- Considered by: House of Commons of Canada

Legislative history
- Bill citation: Bill C-7, House of Commons Bills, 37th Parliament, Second Session
- Introduced by: Robert Nault
- First reading: 9 October 2002
- Considered in committee: 28 May 2003
- Status: Not passed

Bill C-7: First Nations Governance Act (French: Projet de loi C-7: Loi sur la gouvernance des premières nations) was a 2002 legislative proposal of the Canadian government of Prime Minister Jean Chrétien to reform the Indian Act. Introduced by Robert Nault, the Minister of Indian Affairs, the bill was opposed by several First Nations groups and was never enacted into law. Chrétien's successor, Paul Martin, abandoned the proposed bill shortly after he assumed office in 2003.

The bill was the result of consultation with First Nations communities, and was first introduced in the House of Commons on June 14, 2002. After the bill died on the order paper that session, Nault reintroduced it as Bill C-7 on October 9, 2002. It would have introduced a framework for First Nations to design new codes for elections, financial management, and administration. It also would have brought First Nations bands under the Canadian Human Rights Act.

Nault's stated purpose in proposing the legislation was to make native reserves more democratic and accountable. He said that his proposals represented an "interim step towards self-government" and were a response to demands by First Nations activists who opposed secrecy and corruption in their communities. Nault also sought to have representatives of First Nations groups on the House of Commons committee that reviewed the bill.

Several First Nations chiefs from across the country opposed the bill, arguing that Nault had not undertaken proper consultations. Some groups, such as the Assembly of First Nations, argued that the basic principle of the bill ran counter to the concept of First Nations' inherent sovereignty. Matthew Coon Come, the leader of the AFN, argued that the legislation was grounded in the same paternalistic model as the Indian Act.

Margaret Swan of Manitoba's Southern Chiefs' Organization said that First Nations communities were not opposed to greater accountability and transparency, but added that Nault had made a serious error in bypassing the elected leadership of these communities. She also warned that there would be civil disobedience if the bill passed.

However, other First Nations, such as some chiefs in Saskatchewan, were more open to the proposed legislation. When the principles of the bill were first announced in 2001, Chief Marcel Head of Shoal Lake Cree Nation said that the bill may be helpful: "We have an opportunity to design a future that is best for our people".

Nault acknowledged in late 2003 that the legislation would not pass. In early 2004, Prime Minister Martin announced that the government would not proceed with the bill.
