= William Moore Benidickson =

Canadian politician (1911–1985)

The Honourable William Benidickson PC

Minister of Mines and Technical Surveys
- In office 22 April 1963 – 6 July 1965
- Prime Minister: Lester B. Pearson
- Preceded by: Paul Martineau
- Succeeded by: John Watson MacNaught

Canadian Senator from Ontario
- In office 7 July 1965 – 4 January 1985

Member of Parliament for Kenora—Rainy River
- In office 11 June 1945 – 6 July 1965
- Preceded by: Hugh McKinnon
- Succeeded by: John Mercer Reid

Personal details
- Born: 8 April 1911 Dauphin, Manitoba, Canada
- Died: 4 January 1985 (aged 73) Ottawa, Ontario, Canada
- Party: Liberal
- Other political affiliations: Liberal-Labour
- Spouse: Agnes McCausland Richardson (m. 1937)
- Children: 3
- Education: University of Manitoba
- Profession: Politician; Barrister

William Moore Benidickson PC (8 April 1911 – 4 January 1985) was a Canadian politician. He was the Liberal-Labour Member of Parliament for Kenora—Rainy River for over twenty years.

== Background ==
Born in Manitoba of Icelandic stock, Benidickson served in World War II as a Wing-Commander in the Royal Canadian Air Force.

Following the war, he was elected to the House of Commons of Canada in the 1945 federal election.

Due to the politics of Kenora—Rainy River which had a history electing Independent Labour politicians and where the Co-operative Commonwealth Federation posed a serious threat, the Liberals worked with the Communist Party of Canada to run Liberal-Labour candidates in federal and provincial elections. Accordingly, Benidickson ran and was elected as a "Liberal-Labour" MP for most of his parliamentary career though he always sat with the Liberal caucus and was considered a Liberal for all intents and purposes.

Benidickson served as parliamentary assistant to the minister of finance Douglas Abbott before serving in the same capacity to the minister of transport through the 1950s.

In 1963, Benidickson joined the cabinet of Lester Pearson as Minister of Mines and Technical Surveys. Pearson appointed him to the Senate of Canada in 1965 where he sat as a straight Liberal until his death in 1985.

Benidickson's wife, Agnes was a member of Winnipeg's prominent Richardson family and later served as chancellor of Queen's University.
