= Bill Noden =

Canadian politician

Ontario MPP
- In office 1951–1967
- Preceded by: James Newman
- Succeeded by: T. Patrick Reid
- Constituency: Rainy River

Personal details
- Born: November 30, 1898 Sand Point Lake, Ontario
- Died: July 1, 1973 (aged 74) Nanaimo, British Columbia
- Political party: Progressive Conservative
- Children: William Fraser Noden; Francis Mather Noden

William George Noden (November 30, 1898 – July 1, 1973) was a politician in Ontario, Canada. He was a Progressive Conservative member of the Legislative Assembly of Ontario from 1951 to 1967 who represented the northern Ontario riding of Rainy River.

== Background ==
He was born in Sand Point Lake, Ontario, on the border of the U.S. state of Minnesota and Ontario. From 1926 to 1958, Noden was the co-owner the Gillmor-Noden Hardware Store on Scott, the main street in Fort Frances. He was a Mason and a member of Granite Lodge #446.

== Politics ==
Noden ran as the Progressive Conservative candidate in the 1951 provincial election. He defeated Liberal-Labour incumbent James Newman by 452 votes. He was re-elected three times before retiring in 1967. He sat as a backbench supporter of the governments of Leslie Frost and John Robarts. In recognition of his public service, the three and a half mile causeway linking Rainy River to Atikokan and carrying Ontario Highway 11, was named the "Noden Causeway," which opened on June 28, 1965, while Noden was still an MPP.
