= Randolph George Croome =

Canadian politician

Ontario MPP
- In office 1934–1943
- Preceded by: William Herbert Elliott
- Succeeded by: George Edward Lockhart
- Constituency: Rainy River

Personal details
- Born: July 29, 1883; Invermay, Ontario
- Died: March 22, 1956 (aged 72); Port Arthur, Ontario
- Political party: Liberal
- Spouse: Etta Harmer (m. 1904)
- Occupation: Railway conductor

Randolph George Croome (July 29, 1884 – March 22, 1956) was a railway conductor and political figure in Ontario. He represented Rainy River in the Legislative Assembly of Ontario from 1934 to 1943 as a Liberal member.

He was born in Invermay in 1884, the son of William Carl Croome and Elizabeth Loree, and was educated there. In 1904, Croome married Etta Harmer. He worked for the Canadian National Railway. He died at Port Arthur, Ontario (presently Thunder Bay) in 1956.
