= John Fullarton Callan =

Canadian politician from Ontario

Member of the Ontario Provincial Parliament for Rainy River
- In office June 25, 1923 – October 18, 1926
- Preceded by: James Arthur Mathieu
- Succeeded by: James Arthur Mathieu

Personal details
- Party: Labour

John Fullarton Callan was a Canadian politician from Ontario. He represented Rainy River in the Legislative Assembly of Ontario from 1923 to 1926 as a Labour representative.

== Political career ==
Callan was elected to the Legislative Assembly of Ontario in the 1923 Ontario general election, defeating incumbent Conservative MLA James Arthur Mathieu and Liberal candidate Edward Callaghan in the riding of Rainy River. Callan received 1,738 votes, compared with 1,590 for Mathieu and 740 for Callaghan.

His election occurred during the collapse of the governing United Farmers of Ontario–Labour coalition. While Labour suffered heavy losses across the province in 1923, Callan was one of only four Labour candidates elected to the legislature.

Callan served as the Labour member for Rainy River throughout the 16th Parliament of Ontario. He was one of the few Labour representatives from Northern Ontario during this period.

In the 1926 Ontario general election, Callan was defeated by Mathieu, who regained the seat for the Conservatives. Mathieu subsequently returned to the legislature and served until 1929.

== Legacy ==
Although little biographical information about Callan has survived in published sources, his election in 1923 represented one of the last successes of the Ontario Labour movement during the interwar period. His victory in Rainy River helped maintain a Labour presence in the legislature after the defeat of the United Farmers–Labour government of Premier Ernest C. Drury.

== See also ==
- 16th Parliament of Ontario
- 1923 Ontario general election
- Labour candidates and parties in Canada
