= Francis Henry Keefer =

Canadian politician

Ontario MPP
- In office 1923–1926
- Preceded by: Donald Hogarth
- Succeeded by: Donald Hogarth
- Constituency: Port Arthur

Member of Parliament for Port Arthur and Kenora
- In office 1917–1921
- Preceded by: New riding
- Succeeded by: Dougald Kennedy

Personal details
- Born: 24 July 1860 Strathroy, Canada West
- Died: 4 December 1928 (aged 68) Toronto, Ontario
- Party: Conservative
- Spouses: Annie Frances Daby (m. 1884–1915) Margaret Wilhelmina Keefer (m. 1918)
- Occupation: Lawyer
- Portfolio: Parliamentary Under Secretary of State for External Affairs (1918-1920)

Francis Henry Keefer, QC (24 July 1860 – 4 December 1928) was a Canadian lawyer and politician.

== Life ==
Born in Strathroy, Canada West, the son of James Keefer and Maria Cook, studied at the Strathroy Grammar School and Upper Canada College before receiving his Bachelor of Arts degree in 1881, a Master of Arts degree in 1882, and a Bachelor of Laws in 1882 all from the University of Toronto. In 1883, he moved to Prince Arthur's Landing (now Thunder Bay) and was called to the Bar in 1884. He practiced law with his brother Thomas Alexander Keefer (c1850-1893). He was created a federal Queen's Counsel in July 1896 and a provincial King's Counsel in January 1908.

He first ran unsuccessfully for the Canadian House of Commons as the Conservative candidate for the riding of Thunder Bay and Rainy River in the 1908 federal election. He was elected for Port Arthur and Kenora as the Unionist candidate in the 1917 election and was defeated in 1921. Keefer served as Parliamentary Undersecretary of State for External Affairs from November 1918 to July 1920.

Keefer also served municipally, as solicitor and counsel in Port Arthur from 1889 to 1910. At various times he acted as Crown Counsel in the Thunder Bay district.

He was a persistent advocate of deep waterways on the Great Lakes, later known as the St Lawrence Seaway and was the Canadian government's watchdog on international water questions such as water levels on the Great Lakes and Lake of the Woods, and the Chicago River water diversion. He also did legal work for the International Joint Commission.

Keefer married Annie Frances Daby in 1884. After her death in 1915, Keefer married Margaret Wilhelmina Keefer (her father's surname was identical).

He was elected as the Conservative candidate to the Legislative Assembly of Ontario in the 1923 provincial election for the riding of Port Arthur and served until November 1926. He lost the Conservative nomination to the younger and more politically astute Donald McDonald Hogarth. Ontario premier G. Howard Ferguson appointed Keefer Public Trustee of Ontario in April 1928, but Keefer died in Toronto following a heart attack in December that year.
