= Greg Rickford =

Canadian politician (born 1967)

The Honourable Greg Rickford PC ECO KC MPP
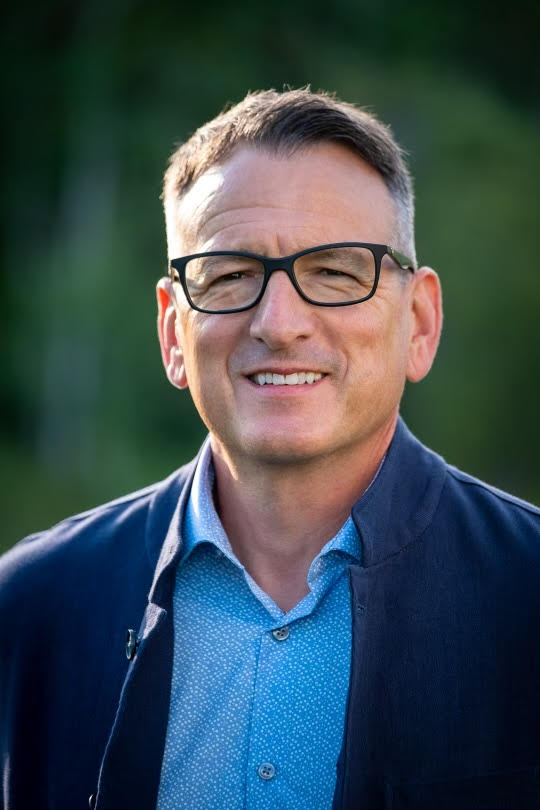
- Rickford in 2022

Minister of Indigenous Affairs and First Nations Economic Reconciliation
- Incumbent
- Assumed office June 29, 2018
- Premier: Doug Ford
- Preceded by: David Zimmer

Minister of Northern Development
- Incumbent
- Assumed office June 24, 2022
- Premier: Doug Ford
- Preceded by: Himself (as Minister of Energy, Northern Development and Mines)

Member of the Ontario Provincial Parliament for Kenora—Rainy River
- Incumbent
- Assumed office June 7, 2018
- Preceded by: Sarah Campbell

Member of Parliament for Kenora
- In office October 14, 2008 – August 4, 2015
- Preceded by: Roger Valley
- Succeeded by: Bob Nault
Additional offices held
Ontario Minister of Northern Development, Mines, Natural Resources and Forestry
In office June 18, 2021 – June 24, 2022
Premier	Doug Ford
Preceded by	Himself (as Minister of Energy, Northern Development and Mines) John Yakabuski (as Minister of Natural Resources and Forestry)
Succeeded by	Himself (as Minister of Northern Development) Graydon Smith (as Minister of Natural Resources and Forestry)
Ontario Minister of Energy, Northern Development and Mines
In office June 29, 2018 – June 18, 2021
Premier	Doug Ford
Preceded by	Glenn Thibeault (Energy); Michael Gravelle (Northern Development & Mines)
Succeeded by	Todd Smith (Energy)
Minister of Natural Resources
In office March 19, 2014 – November 4, 2015
Prime Minister	Stephen Harper
Preceded by	Joe Oliver
Succeeded by	Jim Carr
Minister for the Federal Economic Development Initiative for Northern Ontario
In office July 15, 2013 – November 4, 2015
Prime Minister	Stephen Harper
Preceded by	Tony Clement
Succeeded by	Position abolished
Minister of State for Science and Technology
In office July 15, 2013 – March 19, 2014
Prime Minister	Stephen Harper
Preceded by	Gary Goodyear
Succeeded by	Ed Holder
Parliamentary Secretary to the Minister of Indian and Northern Affairs
In office January 30, 2011 – July 15, 2013
Prime Minister	Stephen Harper
Preceded by	Position established
Succeeded by	Mark Strahl

Personal details
- Born: David Gregory Rickford; September 24, 1967 (age 59) Paris, Ontario, Canada
- Party: Progressive Conservative
- Other political affiliations: Conservative
- Education: Mohawk College (Dipl.); University of Victoria (BScN); McGill University (JD, BCL); Université Laval (MBA)
- Occupation: Politician; nurse; lawyer

David Gregory Rickford PC ECO KC MPP (born September 24, 1967) is a Canadian politician. He is the Minister of Northern Development and Minister of Indigenous Affairs in the Executive Council of Ontario under Premier Doug Ford. He represents the Kenora—Rainy River riding in the Legislative Assembly of Ontario.

Rickford previously served as the federal Minister of Natural Resources and as the Minister of State for Science and Technology in the cabinet of Prime Minister Stephen Harper. He was elected to the House of Commons in the 2008 federal election and represented the electoral district of Kenora as a member of the Conservative Party until his defeat in the 2015 election.

== Background ==
Rickford was born in Paris, Ontario, on September 24, 1967. He worked as a nurse and lawyer in the remote First Nations communities of the Kenora District.

== Federal politics ==
Rickford was elected to represent the Ontario electoral district of Kenora in the 2008 federal election and re-elected in the 2011 election.

A member of the Conservative Party of Canada, Rickford was the first Conservative MP elected in the Kenora riding and the first right-wing MP to represent the Kenora area since 1921.

Prime Minister Stephen Harper appointed Rickford Parliamentary Secretary for Official Languages on August 30, 2010.

On January 30, 2011, Rickford was appointed Parliamentary Secretary to the Minister of Indian Affairs and Northern Development.

On July 15, 2013, he was appointed the Minister of State (Science and Technology, and Federal Economic Development Initiative for Northern Ontario).

On March 19, 2014, he was appointed to succeed Joe Oliver as Minister of Natural Resources.

He was defeated in the October 19, 2015 Canadian federal election by Bob Nault. Nault had represented the predecessor riding of Kenora-Rainy River from 1988 until 2004, when he chose not to run in the 2004 Canadian federal election. Rickford was pushed into third place, behind Nault and former Ontario New Democratic Party leader Howard Hampton.

== Provincial politics ==
Rickford re-entered politics on November 18, 2017, when he was acclaimed as the Progressive Conservative Party of Ontario candidate in Kenora—Rainy River for the 2018 election. The Progressive Conservatives won a majority government in the June 7, election and Rickford was elected in his riding.

On June 29, 2018, Rickford was appointed Ministry of Energy, Mines, Northern Development and Indigenous Affairs in the cabinet of Premier Doug Ford.

== Electoral record ==
2025 Ontario general election: Kenora—Rainy River
Party	Candidate	Votes	%	±%
Progressive Conservative	Greg Rickford	10,541	59.93	+0.35
New Democratic	Rudy Turtle	3,308	18.81	–1.11
Liberal	Anthony Leek	3,072	17.46	+6.11
Green	John Redins	336	1.91	–1.88
New Blue	Randy Ricci	333	1.89	–0.55
Total valid votes		17,590	99.29	
Total rejected, unmarked and declined ballots		125	0.71	–0.74
Turnout		17,715	47.18	+6.97
Eligible voters		37,548		
Progressive Conservative hold		Swing		+0.73
Source: Elections Ontario

2022 Ontario general election: Kenora—Rainy River
Party	Candidate	Votes	%	±%	Expenditures
Progressive Conservative	Greg Rickford	9,567	59.57	+11.01	$56,299
New Democratic	Joanne Formanek Gustafson	3,199	19.92	–17.41	$14,415
Liberal	Anthony Leek	1,823	11.35	+0.77	$32,991
Green	Catherine Kiewning	608	3.79	+0.26	$1,339
New Blue	Kelvin Boucher-Chicago	393	2.45	–	$4,074
Ontario Party	Larry Breiland	276	1.72	–	$0
Consensus Ontario	Richard A. Jonasson	98	0.61	–	$0
Independent	Mi'Azhikwan	95	0.59	–	$0
Total valid votes/expense limit		16,059	98.56	–	$66,892
Total rejected, unmarked and declined ballots		235	1.44	+0.49	
Turnout		16,294	40.21	–13.91	
Eligible voters		40,525			
Progressive Conservative hold		Swing		+14.21	
Source: Elections Ontario

2018 Ontario general election: Kenora—Rainy River
Party	Candidate	Votes	%	±%
Progressive Conservative	Greg Rickford	9,748	48.57	+23.08
New Democratic	Glen Archer	7,493	37.33	-18.32
Liberal	Karen Kejick	2,123	10.58	-5.19
Green	Ember McKillop	707	3.52	+0.45
Total valid votes		20,071	100.0	
Turnout			56.6	
Eligible voters		35,457		
Progressive Conservative gain from New Democratic		Swing		+20.54
Source: Elections Ontario

2015 Canadian federal election: Kenora
Party	Candidate	Votes	%
Liberal	Bob Nault	10,898	35.39
New Democratic	Howard Hampton	10,379	33.71
Conservative	Greg Rickford	8,760	28.45
Green	Ember C. McKilop	501	1.63
Independent	Kelvin Boucher-Chicago	162	0.53
Total valid votes		30,791	100.00

2011 Canadian federal election: Kenora
Party	Candidate	Votes	%	±%	Expenditures
Conservative	Greg Rickford	11,567	47.05	+6.59	–
New Democratic	Tania Cameron	6,855	27.88	+4.65	–
Liberal	Roger Valley	5,381	21.89	-9.74	–
Green	Mike Schwindt	636	2.59	-2.09	–
Independent	Kelvin Chicago-Boucher	147	0.60	–	–
Total valid votes		24,586	100.00		
Total rejected ballots		120	0.49	+0.09	
Turnout		24,706	60.38	+5.01	
Eligible voters		40,917	–	–	

2008 Canadian federal election: Kenora
Party	Candidate	Votes	%	±%	Expenditures
Conservative	Greg Rickford	9,395	40.46	+9.47	$80,724
Liberal	Roger Valley	7,344	31.63	-4.89	$63,788
New Democratic	Tania Cameron	5,394	23.23	-6.72	$59,298
Green	JoJo Holiday	1,087	4.68	+2.14	$362
Total valid votes/Expense limit		23,220	100.00	$90,484	
Total rejected ballots		94	0.40	+0.09	
Turnout		23,314	55.37	-8.11	
Conservative gain from Liberal		Swing		-7.18	

=== Cabinet positions ===
Ford ministry, Province of Ontario (2018–present)
Cabinet posts (3)
Predecessor	Office	Successor
Glenn Thibeault	Minister of Energy; June 29, 2018 – present	Incumbent
David Zimmer	Minister of Indigenous Affairs; June 29, 2018 – present	Incumbent
Michael Gravelle	Minister of Northern Development and Mines; June 29, 2018 – present	Incumbent
28th Canadian Ministry (2006–2015) – Cabinet of Stephen Harper
Cabinet posts (3)
Predecessor	Office	Successor
Joe Oliver	Minister of Natural Resources; March 19, 2014 – November 4, 2015	Jim Carr
Tony Clement	Minister for the Federal Economic Development Initiative for Northern Ontario; July 15, 2013 – November 4, 2015	Position Abolished
Gary Goodyear	Minister of State for Science and Technology; July 15, 2013 – March 19, 2014	Ed Holder
