= John Mercer Reid =

Canadian politician (1937–2022)

- Official 1980 portrait

Member of the Canadian Parliament for Kenora—Rainy River
- In office 8 November 1965 – 3 September 1984
- Preceded by: William Moore Benidickson
- Succeeded by: John Edmund Parry

Personal details
- Born: 8 February 1937 Fort Frances, Ontario, Canada
- Died: 25 August 2022 (aged 85) Ottawa, Ontario, Canada
- Party: Liberal
- Other political affiliations: Liberal-Labour
- Spouse: Marie Ellen Balcaen (m. 1966)
- Children: four
- Education: University of Manitoba, University of Toronto
- Profession: professor, lecturer, teacher

John Mercer Reid, PC (8 February 1937 – 25 August 2022) was a Canadian politician and an Information Commissioner of Canada who served as president of the Canadian Nuclear Association.

== History ==
He earned university degrees in history from the University of Manitoba and was studying for his doctorate from the University of Toronto when he was offered a job as special assistant to member of parliament William Benidickson. In 1965 Benedickson was nominated to the Senate of Canada and Reid was nominated to replace him as candidate for his seat as an MP in the 1965 election.

He was first elected to the House of Commons of Canada in the 1965 election as a Liberal Member of Parliament (MP). In the 1968 federal election, he was returned as Canada's sole Liberal-Labour MP, although he remained in the Liberal caucus. The Liberal-Labour label was a reflection of a longstanding tradition in the riding of Kenora—Rainy River aimed at deflecting votes from the New Democratic Party, rather than as a mark of political dissent.

After the 1972 election, Reid was redesignated as a Liberal MP and became parliamentary secretary to the President of the Queen's Privy Council for Canada, and worked on issues such as improving the access of MPs to government records.

In 1978, Reid joined the Cabinet of Prime Minister Pierre Trudeau as Minister of State for federal-provincial relations, and remained in that position until the defeat of the Liberal government in the 1979 election. Reid remained an MP until his own defeat in the 1984 election.

In his post-political career, Reid became a public affairs consultant. He served as president of the Canadian Nuclear Association from 1990 until 1995. He then represented Canada on the Organization for Security and Co-operation in Europe's Mission to Bosnia and Herzegovina, and was also a member of the Provisional Election Commission responsible for writing and implementing an Election Act. He was also an advisor to the Chief Electoral Officer on UN Transitional Administration in Eastern Slovenia.

In 1998, Reid was appointed Information Commissioner of Canada for a seven-year term. The Information Commissioner of Canada is an independent ombudsman who investigates complaints from those who believe they have been denied rights to government information under the Access to Information Act.

In 2001, Reid was the recipient of the Distinguished Service Award from the Canadian Association of Former Parliamentarians, awarded to a former parliamentarian "who has made an outstanding contribution to the country and its democratic institutions." He died on 25 August 2022 at the age of 85, from cancer.
