= Dougald Kennedy =

Canadian politician

Member of Parliament for Port Arthur and Kenora
- In office December 1921 – September 1925
- Preceded by: Francis Henry Keefer
- Succeeded by: riding dissolved

Personal details
- Born: 12 September 1869 Halton County, Ontario, Canada
- Died: 31 May 1937 (aged 67)
- Party: Progressive
- Profession: Farmer

Dougald Kennedy (12 September 1869 – 31 May 1937) was a Progressive party member of the House of Commons of Canada. He was born in Halton County, Ontario, and became a farmer.

Kennedy was a municipal councillor at Van Horne Township, Ontario.

He was elected to Parliament for the Port Arthur and Kenora riding in the 1921 general election. After completing one federal term, the 14th Canadian Parliament, he left the House of Commons and did not seek re-election in the 1925.
