= Kenora City Council =

Kenora City Council is the governing body for the city of Kenora, Ontario, Canada. The council consists of the mayor and six councillors.

== Current Kenora City Council ==
- Andrew Poirier, mayor
- Graham Chaze, councillor
- Robert Bernie, councillor
- Barbara Manson, councillor
- Lisa Moncrief, councillor
- Lindsay Koch, councillor
- Kelsie Van Bellegham, councillor
