= Kenora—Rainy River (provincial electoral district) =

Provincial electoral district in Ontario, Canada

Coordinates: 49.5°N 92.6°W

Ontario electoral district
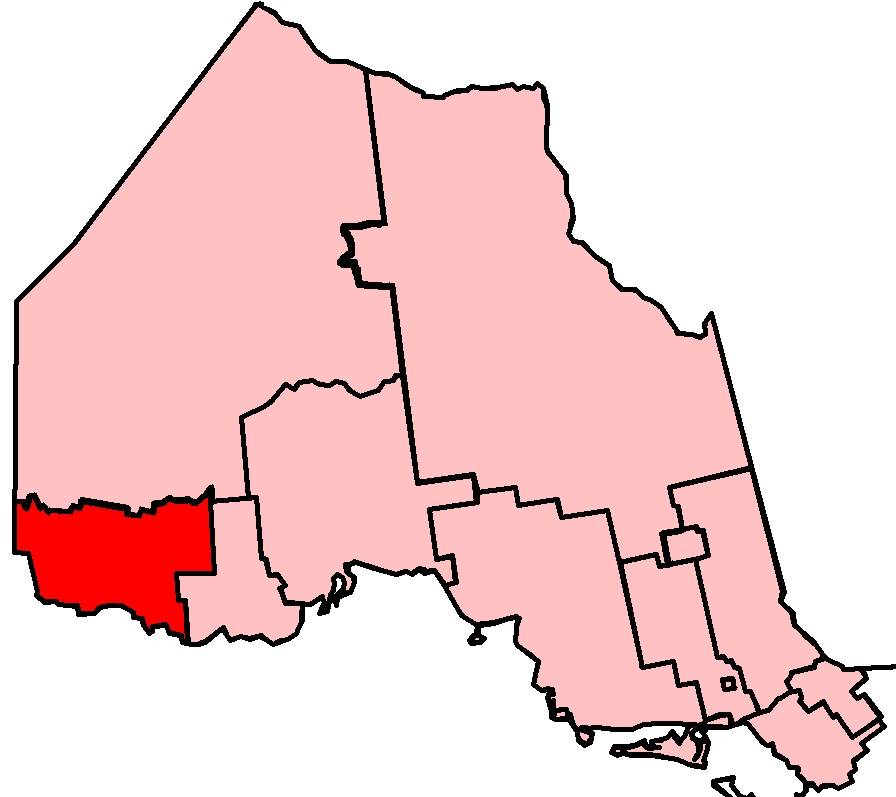
- Kenora—Rainy River in relation to other Northern Ontario electoral districts

Provincial electoral district
- Legislature: Legislative Assembly of Ontario
MPP
Greg Rickford
Progressive Conservative
- District created: 1999
- First contested: 1999
- Last contested: 2025

Demographics
- Population (2016): 53,027
- Electors (2018): 37,442
- Area (km²): 45,201
- Pop. density (per km²): 1.2
- Census division(s): Kenora, Rainy River
- Census subdivision(s): Chapple, Dryden, Emo, Fort Frances, Kenora, Rainy River

Kenora—Rainy River is a provincial electoral district (riding) in northwestern Ontario, Canada, that has been represented in the Legislative Assembly of Ontario since 1999. It was created from Kenora, most of Rainy River and part of Lake Nipigon. The boundaries of the new district corresponded with the Kenora—Rainy River federal riding, until it was abolished in 2003. The provincial riding will continue to exist.

A predominantly white, working class, and rural riding, Kenora-Rainy River was formerly a stronghold for the Ontario NDP. Greg Rickford of the Progressive Conservatives was elected its MPP in a dramatic swing to the right in 2018. The riding was previously represented by Sarah Campbell for the NDP and Howard Hampton, former leader of the Ontario New Democratic Party. The riding includes part of Kenora District, and the western three quarters of the Rainy River District.

== History ==
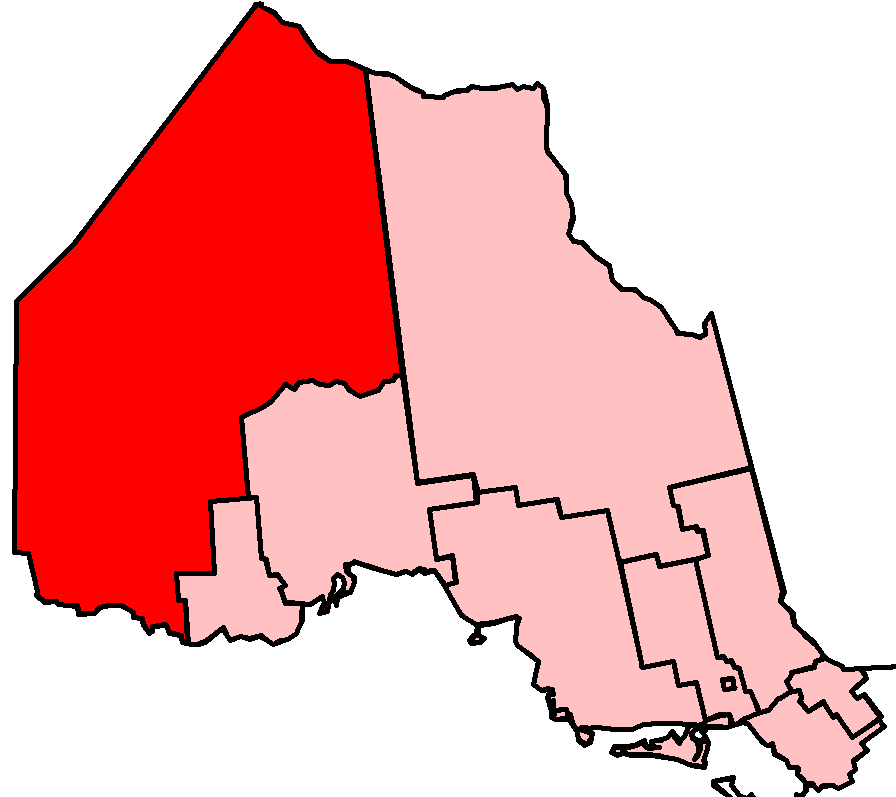
Kenora—Rainy River boundaries from 1999 to 2018

In 1996, Ontario was divided into the same electoral districts as those used for federal electoral purposes. They were redistributed whenever a readjustment took place at the federal level.

In 2005, legislation was passed by the Legislature to divide Ontario into 107 electoral districts, beginning with the next provincial election in 2007. The eleven northern electoral districts, including Kenora—Rainy River, are those defined for federal purposes in 1996, based on the 1991 census (except for a minor boundary adjustment). The 96 southern electoral districts are those defined for federal electoral purposes in 2003, based on the 2001 census. Without this legislation, the number of electoral districts in northern Ontario would have been reduced from eleven to ten.

Prior to the 2018 provincial election, the Ontario government's Far North Electoral Boundaries Commission proposed dividing Kenora—Rainy River into one riding for the urbanized southern portion of the current district, which will retain the name Kenora—Rainy River, and one riding for the predominantly Indigenous northern portion of the current district, to be named Kiiwetinoong. The creation of Kiiwetinoong and Mushkegowuk—James Bay, another new northern riding, were approved with the passage of the Representation Statute Law Amendment Act, 2017 in the Legislative Assembly of Ontario.

== Members ==
Kenora—Rainy River
Assembly	Years	Member	Party
Riding created from Kenora, Rainy River and Lake Nipigon
37th	1999–2003	Howard Hampton	New Democratic
38th	2003–2007	Howard Hampton	New Democratic
39th	2007–2011	Howard Hampton	New Democratic
40th	2011–2014	Sarah Campbell	New Democratic
41st	2014–2018	Sarah Campbell	New Democratic
42nd	2018–2022	Greg Rickford	Progressive Conservative
43rd	2022–2025	Greg Rickford	Progressive Conservative
44th	2025–present	Greg Rickford	Progressive Conservative

== Election results ==
Winning party in each polling division of Kenora—Rainy River at the 2025 Ontario general election

2025 Ontario general election
Party	Candidate	Votes	%	±%
Progressive Conservative	Greg Rickford	10,541	59.93	+0.35
New Democratic	Rudy Turtle	3,308	18.81	–1.11
Liberal	Anthony Leek	3,072	17.46	+6.11
Green	John Redins	336	1.91	–1.88
New Blue	Randy Ricci	333	1.89	–0.55
Total valid votes		17,590	99.29	
Total rejected, unmarked and declined ballots		125	0.71	–0.74
Turnout		17,715	47.18	+6.97
Eligible voters		37,548		
Progressive Conservative hold		Swing		+0.73
Source: Elections Ontario

Winning party in each polling division of Kenora—Rainy River at the 2022 Ontario general election

2022 Ontario general election
Party	Candidate	Votes	%	±%	Expenditures
Progressive Conservative	Greg Rickford	9,567	59.57	+11.01	$56,299
New Democratic	Joanne Formanek Gustafson	3,199	19.92	–17.41	$14,415
Liberal	Anthony Leek	1,823	11.35	+0.77	$32,991
Green	Catherine Kiewning	608	3.79	+0.26	$1,339
New Blue	Kelvin Boucher-Chicago	393	2.45	–	$4,074
Ontario Party	Larry Breiland	276	1.72	–	$0
Consensus Ontario	Richard A. Jonasson	98	0.61	–	$0
Independent	Mi'Azhikwan	95	0.59	–	$0
Total valid votes/expense limit		16,059	98.56	–	$66,892
Total rejected, unmarked and declined ballots		235	1.44	+0.49	
Turnout		16,294	40.21	–13.91	
Eligible voters		40,525			
Progressive Conservative hold		Swing		+14.21	
Source: Elections Ontario

2018 Ontario general election
Party	Candidate	Votes	%	±%	Expenditures
Progressive Conservative	Greg Rickford	9,748	48.57	+19.06	$62,932
New Democratic	Glen Archer	7,493	37.33	–15.40	$34,256
Liberal	Karen Kejick	2,123	10.58	–4.31	$15,033
Green	Ember McKillop	707	3.52	+0.55	$81
Total valid votes/expense limit		20,071	99.05		
Total rejected, unmarked and declined ballots		193	0.95		
Turnout		20,264	54.12		
Eligible voters		37,442			
Progressive Conservative notional gain from New Democratic		Swing		+17.23	
Source: Elections Ontario

2014 general election redistributed results
Party	Vote	%
New Democratic	9,410	52.73
Progressive Conservative	5,266	29.51
Liberal	2,657	14.89
Green	513	2.87

2014 Ontario general election
Party	Candidate	Votes	%	±%
New Democratic	Sarah Campbell	12,889	55.66	+6.04
Progressive Conservative	Randy Nickle	5,905	25.50	–12.15
Liberal	Anthony Leek	3,652	15.77	+5.79
Green	Timothy McKillop	711	3.07	+1.30
Total valid votes		23,157	99.31	
Total rejected, unmarked and declined ballots		161	0.69	+0.40
Turnout		23,318	46.72	+0.97
Eligible voters		49,912		
New Democratic hold		Swing		+9.09
Source: Elections Ontario

2011 Ontario general election
Party	Candidate	Votes	%	±%
New Democratic	Sarah Campbell	10,949	49.62	–11.00
Progressive Conservative	Rod McKay	8,307	37.65	+25.95
Liberal	Anthony Leek	2,202	9.98	–14.44
Green	JoJo Holiday	391	1.77	–1.49
Northern Ontario Heritage	Charmaine Romaniuk	216	0.98	–
Total valid votes		22,065	99.71	
Total rejected, unmarked and declined ballots		65	0.29	–0.57
Turnout		22,130	45.75	–0.41
Eligible voters		48,369		
New Democratic hold		Swing		–18.47
Source: Elections Ontario

2007 Ontario general election
Party	Candidate	Votes	%	±%
New Democratic	Howard Hampton	14,281	60.62	+0.50
Liberal	Mike Wood	5,752	24.42	–1.47
Progressive Conservative	Penny Lucas	2,757	11.70	–1.13
Green	JoJo Holiday	769	3.26	+2.09
Total valid votes		23,559	99.14	
Total rejected, unmarked and declined ballots		205	0.86	+0.26
Turnout		23,764	46.16	–2.41
Eligible voters		51,482		
New Democratic hold		Swing		+0.99
Source: Elections Ontario

2003 Ontario general election
Party	Candidate	Votes	%	±%
New Democratic	Howard Hampton	15,666	60.12	+15.38
Liberal	Geoff McClain	6,746	25.89	–9.26
Progressive Conservative	Cathe M. Hoszowski	3,343	12.83	–4.36
Green	Daniel King	305	1.17	–
Total valid votes		26,060	99.40	
Total rejected, unmarked and declined ballots		158	0.60	–0.06
Turnout		26,218	48.57	–9.02
Eligible voters		53,981		
New Democratic hold		Swing		+12.32
Source: Elections Ontario

1999 Ontario general election
Party	Candidate	Votes	%
New Democratic	Howard Hampton	14,269	44.74
Liberal	Frank Miclash	11,209	35.14
Progressive Conservative	Lynn Beyak	5,483	17.19
Independent	Richard R. Bruyere	934	2.93
Total valid votes		31,895	99.34
Total rejected, unmarked and declined ballots		212	0.66
Turnout		32,107	57.59
Eligible voters		55,752	
New Democratic pickup new district.			
Source: Elections Ontario

== 2007 electoral reform referendum ==
2007 Ontario electoral reform referendum
Side	Votes	%
First Past the Post	15,494	69.9
Mixed member proportional	6,684	30.1
Total valid votes	22,178	100.0

== See also ==
- List of Ontario provincial electoral districts
- Canadian provincial electoral districts

== Sources ==
- Elections Ontario
  - 1999 results
  - 2003 results
  - 2007 results
  - Map of riding for 2018 election
