= Kenora—Rainy River (federal electoral district) =

Former federal electoral district in Ontario, Canada

Coordinates: 49.5°N 92.6°W

Ontario electoral district

Defunct federal electoral district
- Legislature: House of Commons
- District created: 1924
- District abolished: 2003
- First contested: 1925
- Last contested: 2000

Kenora—Rainy River was a federal electoral district represented in the House of Commons of Canada from 1925 to 2004. It was located in the province of Ontario. This riding was created in 1924 from parts of Fort William and Rainy River and Port Arthur and Kenora ridings.

It initially consisted of the parts of the territorial districts of Kenora and Rainy River lying west of the fifth meridian passing between the townships of Melgund and Revell.

In 1933, it was redefined as consisting of the part of the province of Ontario lying west of the fourth meridian including Sioux Lookout, Ignace and Atikokan.

In 1966, it was redefined as consisting of the western parts of the territorial districts of Rainy River and Kenora west of a line drawn (from south to north) beginning at the Duluth, Winnipeg and Pacific Railway bridge and ending at the northern limit of the province.

In 1976, it was redefined as consisting of the western parts of the Territorial Districts of Kenora, Rainy River and Thunder Bay.

The electoral district was abolished in 2003. Rainy River was merged with Thunder Bay—Atikokan to form Thunder Bay—Rainy River, while the rest of the riding became Kenora.

== Members of Parliament ==
This riding has elected the following members of Parliament:

Parliament	Years	Member	Party
Riding created from Fort William and Rainy River and Port Arthur and Kenora
15th	1925–1926	Peter Heenan	Liberal
16th	1926–1926	Peter Heenan	Liberal
16th	1926–1930	Peter Heenan	Liberal
17th	1930–1934	Peter Heenan	Liberal
17th	1934–1935	Hugh McKinnon	Liberal
18th	1935–1940	Hugh McKinnon	Liberal
19th	1940–1945	Hugh McKinnon	Liberal
20th	1945–1949	William Moore Benidickson	Liberal
21st	1949–1953	William Moore Benidickson	Liberal–Labour
22nd	1953–1957	William Moore Benidickson	Liberal–Labour
23rd	1957–1958	William Moore Benidickson	Liberal–Labour
24th	1958–1962	William Moore Benidickson	Liberal–Labour
25th	1962–1963	William Moore Benidickson	Liberal–Labour
26th	1963–1965	William Moore Benidickson	Liberal–Labour
27th	1965–1968	John Mercer Reid	Liberal
28th	1968–1972	John Mercer Reid	Liberal–Labour
29th	1972–1974	John Mercer Reid	Liberal
30th	1974–1979	John Mercer Reid	Liberal
31st	1979–1980	John Mercer Reid	Liberal
32nd	1980–1984	John Mercer Reid	Liberal
33rd	1984–1988	John Edmund Parry	New Democratic
34th	1988–1993	Bob Nault	Liberal
35th	1993–1997	Bob Nault	Liberal
36th	1997–2000	Bob Nault	Liberal
37th	2000–2004	Bob Nault	Liberal
Riding dissolved into Kenora and Thunder Bay—Rainy River

== Election results ==
1925 Canadian federal election
Party	Candidate	Votes
Liberal	Peter Heenan	3,898
Conservative	Harold Machin	3,707
Farmer–Labour	Roderick MacLean	762

1926 Canadian federal election
Party	Candidate	Votes
Liberal	Peter Heenan	5,626
Conservative	Arthur Dufferin George	5,016

Acceptance by Mr. Heenan of an office of emolument under the Crown, October 11, 1926:

By-election on 2 November 1926
Party	Candidate	Votes
Liberal	Peter Heenan	acclaimed

1930 Canadian federal election
Party	Candidate	Votes
Liberal	Peter Heenan	6,313
Unknown	Francis James McManus	5,811

On Mr. Heenan's resignation and on his election to the Legislative Assembly of Ontario, July 10, 1934:

By-election on 24 September 1934
Party	Candidate	Votes
Liberal	Hugh McKinnon	8,618
Conservative	Joseph Derry	2,453

1935 Canadian federal election
Party	Candidate	Votes
Liberal	Hugh McKinnon	8,271
Conservative	Francis James McManus	2,837
Co-operative Commonwealth	John Fullerton Callan	2,169
Reconstruction	George Geddes	1,326

1940 Canadian federal election
Party	Candidate	Votes
Liberal	Hugh McKinnon	10,595
National Government	John Albert Dean	5,286
Co-operative Commonwealth	William Ivens	3,173

1945 Canadian federal election
Party	Candidate	Votes
Liberal	William Moore Benidickson	7,309
Progressive Conservative	Joseph Allan Sherrett	5,260
Co-operative Commonwealth	Ralph Jackson James	4,762
Labor–Progressive	Amos Tobias Hill	705

1949 Canadian federal election
Party	Candidate	Votes
Liberal–Labour	William Moore Benidickson	11,297
Progressive Conservative	Joseph Victor Fregeau	5,024
Co-operative Commonwealth	Ralph Jackson James	3,869

1953 Canadian federal election
Party	Candidate	Votes
Liberal–Labour	William Moore Benidickson	11,380
Progressive Conservative	William John Gray	5,822
Co-operative Commonwealth	Ralph Jackson James	2,411
Independent	Albert Harold Farrington	369

1957 Canadian federal election
Party	Candidate	Votes
Liberal–Labour	William Moore Benidickson	10,701
Progressive Conservative	William John Gray	7,087
Co-operative Commonwealth	Jo Carter	4,689

1958 Canadian federal election
Party	Candidate	Votes
Liberal–Labour	William Moore Benidickson	11,956
Progressive Conservative	John Alexander Robertson	11,773
Co-operative Commonwealth	Andre Welsby	3,487

1962 Canadian federal election
Party	Candidate	Votes
Liberal–Labour	William Moore Benidickson	15,412
Progressive Conservative	Victor K. Croxford	7,123
New Democratic	Paul E. McRae	5,157

1963 Canadian federal election
Party	Candidate	Votes
Liberal–Labour	William Moore Benidickson	16,794
Progressive Conservative	Jean Millar	10,221

1965 Canadian federal election
Party	Candidate	Votes
Liberal	John Mercer Reid	11,488
Progressive Conservative	Jean Millar	7,789
New Democratic	Thomas Moroz	6,650

1968 Canadian federal election
Party	Candidate	Votes
Liberal–Labour	John Mercer Reid	10,144
New Democratic	Harvey H. Moats	5,711
Progressive Conservative	T. Howard Webb	4,655

1972 Canadian federal election
Party	Candidate	Votes
Liberal	John Mercer Reid	9,241
Progressive Conservative	Arnold Beebe	8,238
New Democratic	Bill Watkins	5,263
Independent	Bill Brown	272

1974 Canadian federal election
Party	Candidate	Votes
Liberal	John Mercer Reid	10,319
Progressive Conservative	Arnold Beebe	7,821
New Democratic	Bill Watkins	4,894

1979 Canadian federal election
Party	Candidate	Votes
Liberal	John Mercer Reid	11,793
New Democratic	John Edmund Parry	10,844
Progressive Conservative	Bob Kahoot	10,555
Social Credit	Don Clink	253
Marxist–Leninist	Jerry Sawanas	99

1980 Canadian federal election
Party	Candidate	Votes
Liberal	John Mercer Reid	14,688
New Democratic	John Edmund Parry	14,322
Progressive Conservative	Dan Kotz	5,571
Marxist–Leninist	Jerry Sawanas	120

1984 Canadian federal election
Party	Candidate	Votes
New Democratic	John Edmund Parry	13,319
Progressive Conservative	Al Lugli	12,699
Liberal	John Mercer Reid	9,928

1988 Canadian federal election
Party	Candidate	Votes
Liberal	Bob Nault	13,313
New Democratic	John Edmund Parry	12,102
Progressive Conservative	Dick Motlong	7,496
Christian Heritage	Ed Carlson	1,477
Rhinoceros	Julian Morelli	394

1993 Canadian federal election
Party	Candidate	Votes
Liberal	Bob Nault	22,157
Reform	Mel Fisher	7,094
New Democratic	Peter Kirby	2,194
Progressive Conservative	George Hainsworth	2,062
National	Harold Rowe	698
Not affiliated	April I. McCormick	284

1997 Canadian federal election
Party	Candidate	Votes
Liberal	Bob Nault	14,084
Reform	Ken Hyatt	9,782
New Democratic	Ruth Bergman	6,922
Progressive Conservative	Gordon Lee	2,799

2000 Canadian federal election
Party	Candidate	Votes
Liberal	Bob Nault	14,416
Alliance	Ed Prefontaine	9,125
New Democratic	Susan Barclay	6,868
Progressive Conservative	Brian Barrett	1,476

== See also ==
- List of Canadian electoral districts
- Historical federal electoral districts of Canada
