= Fort William and Rainy River =

Former federal electoral district in Ontario, Canada

Ontario electoral district

Defunct federal electoral district
- Legislature: House of Commons
- District created: 1914
- District abolished: 1924
- First contested: 1917
- Last contested: 1921

Fort William and Rainy River was a federal electoral district represented in the House of Commons of Canada from 1917 to 1925. It was located in the province of Ontario. This riding was created in 1914 from parts of Thunder Bay and Rainy River riding.

It consisted of the southern parts of the territorial districts of Kenora, Rainy River and Thunder Bay.

The electoral district was abolished in 1924 when it was redistributed into Fort William ridings.

== Members of Parliament ==
This riding has elected the following members of Parliament:

Parliament	Years	Member	Party
Riding created from Thunder Bay and Rainy River
13th	1917–1921	Robert James Manion	Government (Unionist)
14th	1921–1925	Robert James Manion	Conservative
Riding dissolved into Fort William

== Election results ==
1917 Canadian federal election
Party	Candidate	Votes
Government (Unionist)	Robert James Manion	5,943
Opposition–Labour	Albert Hugh Dennis	2,560

1921 Canadian federal election
Party	Candidate	Votes
Conservative	Hon. Robert James Manion	5,642
Progressive	DeWitt Clinton Garver	5,342

== See also ==
- List of Canadian electoral districts
- Historical federal electoral districts of Canada
