= Kenora—Kiiwetinoong =

Federal electoral district in Ontario, Canada

Ontario electoral district
- Interactive map of riding boundaries from the 2025 federal election

Federal electoral district
- Legislature: House of Commons
MP
Eric Melillo
Conservative
- District created: 2003
- First contested: 2004
- Last contested: 2025
- District webpage: profile, map

Demographics
- Population (2011): 55,977
- Electors (2011): 42,138
- Area (km²): 321,741
- Pop. density (per km²): 0.17
- Census division(s): Kenora, Thunder Bay
- Census subdivision(s): Kenora, Dryden, Sioux Lookout, Red Lake, Pikangikum, Sandy Lake, Ignace, Kitchenuhmaykoosib Aaki, Machin, Deer Lake, Kasabonika Lake,

Kenora—Kiiwetinoong (formerly Kenora) is a federal electoral district in Ontario, Canada, that has been represented in the House of Commons of Canada since 2004.

Of the federal electoral districts located in Ontario it is the largest by area, and the smallest by population. It encompasses most of Kenora District except for the eastern third, and a small section of the northwest corner of Thunder Bay District. It includes many remote First Nations reserves of extreme Northern Ontario. It succeeds the former federal riding of Kenora—Rainy River.

== Geography ==
It consists of the part of the Territorial District of Kenora lying west of a line drawn due north from the northeast corner of the Territorial District of Thunder Bay (Albany River) to Hudson Bay; and the part of the Territorial District of Thunder Bay lying northwest of a line drawn east from the western limit of the territorial district along the 6th Base Line, north along eastern limit of the townships of Bertrand, McLaurin, Furlonge, Fletcher and Bulmer, and due north to the northern limit of the territorial district.

== History ==
The federal riding was created in 2003 from parts of the Kenora—Rainy River riding. This riding was left unchanged after the 2012 electoral redistribution. Following the 2022 Canadian federal electoral redistribution, this riding will be renamed Kenora—Kiiwetinoong at the first election held after approximately April 2024. It will subsequently lose Fort Hope 64, Neskantaga, Webequie, and Summer Beaver to Thunder Bay—Superior North.

=== Member of Parliament ===
This riding has elected the following members of the House of Commons of Canada:

Parliament	Years	Member	Party
Kenora; Riding created from Kenora—Rainy River
38th	2004–2006	Roger Valley	Liberal
39th	2006–2008	Roger Valley	Liberal
40th	2008–2011	Greg Rickford	Conservative
41st	2011–2015	Greg Rickford	Conservative
42nd	2015–2019	Bob Nault	Liberal
43rd	2019–2021	Eric Melillo	Conservative
44th	2021–2025	Eric Melillo	Conservative
Kenora—Kiiwetinoong
45th	2025–present	Eric Melillo	Conservative

== Demographics ==
According to the 2021 Canadian census

Ethnic groups: 51.0% White, 46.5% Indigenous, 2.5% Other

Languages: 82.2% English, 5.9% Oji-Cree, 4.4% Ojibway, 1.5% French

Religions: 46.6% Christian (16.2% Catholic, 9.4% Anglican, 5.9% United Church, 2.2% Pentecostal, 2.1% Lutheran, 1.5% Baptist, 9.3% other), 5.9% Indigenous spirituality, 46.2% none

Median income: $41,600 (2020)

Average income: $49,680 (2020)

== Election results ==
Graph of election results in Kenora (minor parties that never got 2% of the vote or didn't run consistently are omitted)

2025 Canadian federal election
Party	Candidate	Votes	%	±%	Expenditures
Conservative	Eric Melillo	13,109	48.7	+5.45	
Liberal	Charles Fox	9,454	35.2	+15.33	
New Democratic	Tania Cameron	3,698	13.8	–15.42	
Green	Jon Hobbs	286	1.1	–0.32	
People's	Bryce Desjarlais	204	0.8	–5.55	
Independent	Kelvin Boucher-Chicago	141	0.5	N/A	
Total valid votes/expense limit		26,892	99.4	—	
Total rejected ballots		174	0.6	—	
Turnout		27,066	60.7	+3.1	
Eligible voters		44,617			
Conservative hold		Swing		–4.94	
Source: Elections Canada

2021 federal election redistributed results
Party	Vote	%
Conservative	11,033	43.32
New Democratic	7,422	29.14
Liberal	5,055	19.85
People's	1,606	6.31
Green	354	1.39

2021 Canadian federal election: Kenora
Party	Candidate	Votes	%	±%	Expenditures
Conservative	Eric Melillo	11,103	42.6	+8.5	$76,445.84
New Democratic	Janine Seymour	7,802	29.9	+1.4	$53,646.32
Liberal	David Bruno	5,190	19.9	-10.1	$42,652.01
People's	Craig Martin	1,625	6.2	+4.8	$6,563.10
Green	Remi Rheault	364	1.4	-4.0	$2,974.40
Total valid votes		26,083	99.6		
Total rejected ballots		118	0.4		
Turnout		26,201	57.6		
Eligible voters		45,500			
Conservative hold		Swing		+3.6	
Source: Elections Canada

2019 Canadian federal election: Kenora
Party	Candidate	Votes	%	±%
Conservative	Eric Melillo	9,313	34.1	+5.64
Liberal	Bob Nault	8,188	30.0	-5.50
New Democratic	Rudy Turtle	7,781	28.5	-5.38
Green	Kirsi Ralko	1,475	5.4	+3.77
People's	Michael Di Pasquale	382	1.4	-
Independent	Kelvin Boucher-Chicago	165	0.6	+0.07
Total valid votes		27,304	100.00	
Conservative gain from Liberal		Swing		+9.04

2015 Canadian federal election
Party	Candidate	Votes	%	±%	Expenditures
Liberal	Bob Nault	10,918	35.50	+13.62	$79,378.88
New Democratic	Howard Hampton	10,420	33.88	+6.00	$149,833.74
Conservative	Greg Rickford	8,751	28.46	-18.59	$143,556.97
Green	Ember C. McKillop	501	1.63	-0.96	$552.95
Independent	Kelvin Boucher-Chicago	162	0.53	-0.07	–
Total valid votes/expense limit		30,752	100.00		$227,087.75
Total rejected ballots		144	0.47	–	
Turnout		30,896	72.61	–	
Eligible voters		42,548			
Liberal gain from Conservative		Swing		+16.10	
Source: Elections Canada

2011 Canadian federal election
Party	Candidate	Votes	%	±%	Expenditures
Conservative	Greg Rickford	11,567	47.05	+6.59	–
New Democratic	Tania Cameron	6,855	27.88	+4.65	–
Liberal	Roger Valley	5,381	21.89	-9.74	–
Green	Mike Schwindt	636	2.59	-2.09	–
Independent	Kelvin Chicago-Boucher	147	0.60	–	–
Total valid votes		24,586	100.00		
Total rejected ballots		120	0.49	+0.09	
Turnout		24,706	60.38	+5.01	
Eligible voters		40,917	–	–	

2008 Canadian federal election
Party	Candidate	Votes	%	±%	Expenditures
Conservative	Greg Rickford	9,395	40.46	+9.47	$80,724
Liberal	Roger Valley	7,344	31.63	-4.89	$63,788
New Democratic	Tania Cameron	5,394	23.23	-6.72	$59,298
Green	JoJo Holiday	1,087	4.68	+2.14	$362
Total valid votes/expense limit		23,220	100.00	$90,484	
Total rejected ballots		94	0.40	+0.09	
Turnout		23,314	55.37	-8.11	
Conservative gain from Liberal		Swing		-7.18	

2006 Canadian federal election
Party	Candidate	Votes	%	±%	Expenditures
Liberal	Roger Valley	9,937	36.52	+0.29	$75,329
Conservative	Bill Brown	8,434	30.99	+3.07	$62,258
New Democratic	Susan Barclay	8,149	29.95	-2.11	$79,469
Green	Dave Vasey	692	2.54	-1.26	$0
Total valid votes/expense limit		27,212	100.00	–	
Total rejected ballots		85	0.31	-0.22	
Turnout		27,297	63.48	+8.22	

2004 Canadian federal election
Party	Candidate	Votes	%	±%	Expenditures
Liberal	Roger Valley	8,563	36.23	–	$66,623
New Democratic	Susan Barclay	7,577	32.06	–	$34,796
Conservative	Bill Brown	6,598	27.92	–	$27,132
Green	Carl Chaboyer	898	3.80	–	$1,530
Total valid votes/expense limit		23,636	100.00	–	
Total rejected ballots		126	0.53		
Turnout		23,762	55.26		

== See also ==
- List of Canadian electoral districts
- Historical federal electoral districts of Canada
