= Lynn Beyak =

Canadian politician (born 1949)

The Honourable Lynn Beyak

Canadian Senator from Ontario
- In office January 25, 2013 – January 25, 2021
- Nominated by: Stephen Harper
- Appointed by: David Johnston
- Succeeded by: Hassan Yussuff

Personal details
- Born: Jean Lynn Smith; February 18, 1949 (age 77)
- Party: Independent (2018–2021)
- Other political affiliations: Conservative (until 2018)
- Spouse: Tony Beyak (m. 1970; died 2002)

Jean Lynn Beyak (née Smith; born February 18, 1949) is a retired Canadian politician who represented Ontario in the Senate of Canada from January 25, 2013, to January 25, 2021. Initially appointed to the Senate as a Conservative on the advice of Stephen Harper, she sat as a non-affiliated (independent) senator after being removed from the Conservative caucus in 2017. Beyak was suspended from the Senate twice; a first time for posting letters to her website that were considered to be offensive to First Nations peoples, and a second time for failing to comply with mandated anti-racism training. Beyak announced her retirement from the Senate, effective immediately, on January 25, 2021.

== Career ==
A business owner in Dryden, Ontario, Beyak worked in tourism, insurance and real estate. She co-owned a General Motors dealership and Ford dealership with her late husband.

Beyak was previously a candidate for the Ontario Progressive Conservative Party in the Ontario provincial elections of 1995 and 1999, and has served on the Fort Frances-Rainy River board of education. She was appointed to the Senate of Canada in 2013 by Stephen Harper.

She sat as a Conservative until being expelled by the Conservative caucus in 2017. In 2020, she donated $1,000 to the People's Party of Canada, the maximum allowable donation.

== Residential schools controversy ==
Beyak has been critical of the findings of the Truth and Reconciliation Commission that the Canadian Indian residential school system was plagued with systemic physical, mental, and sexual abuse and directly resulted in the death of at least six thousand children from malnutrition and disease. Beyak said that those findings overshadowed the "good deeds" of "well-intentioned" residential school workers.

Beyak's statement was repudiated by New Democratic Party Indigenous Affairs critic and residential school survivor Romeo Saganash, who called on her to resign for praising a system that amounted to cultural genocide, as defined by the United Nations; Minister of Indigenous and Northern Affairs and Liberal MP Carolyn Bennett, who called for better education on the subject matter; and Conservative Indigenous Affairs critic Cathy McLeod, who said that Beyak's praise did not reflect the views of the party, which under former Prime Minister Stephen Harper, had made a formal apology for the residential schools. Assembly of First Nations National Chief Perry Bellegarde also criticized the statement for defending a system that had deep negative effects on Aboriginal peoples in Canada. Beyak would later attack criticism of her speech as fake news. However, Beyak's thoughts were deemed out of line with the Conservative party's history on the subject matter by the party's interim leader Rona Ambrose, who stated it was untenable for her to keep her position on the Aboriginal people's committee due to the misalignment of Beyak's comments. On April 5, 2017, Beyak was removed from her Aboriginal people's committee Senate post.

After the Canadian government reorganized the Indian Affairs department August 28, 2017, forming two departments, for Indigenous and Northern Affairs and separately for Indigenous Services, each under its own minister, Sen. Beyak made another public statement: "Let's stop the guilt and blame and find a way to live together and share. Trade your status card for a Canadian citizenship, with a fair and negotiated payout to each Indigenous man, woman and child in Canada, to settle all the outstanding land claims and treaties, and move forward together ... All Canadians are then free to preserve their cultures in their own communities, on their own time, with their own dime. The emphasis should be on individual prosperity and responsibility, with more money in the pockets of the local people, and not just national leaders and bureaucracies." According to Saskatoon StarPhoenix columnist Doug Cuthand, her comments indicated ignorance of history, as the Indigenous peoples of Canada were extended Canadian citizenship in 1951. The mayors of Edmonton, Alberta and Winnipeg, Manitoba have called on her to resign. According to Brian Giesbrecht of the Frontier Centre for Public Policy, "Sen. Beyak has an abiding belief that the system we have in this country is not working, despite what the flabbergasted mayor and interviewer think of her." "When the senator says that status Indians are not true Canadian citizens, she is absolutely correct." "The fact is that status Indians living on reserves are legally very different from mainstream Canadians in many important ways."

Following the backlash regarding her controversial speech, Beyak published, on her senate web page, samples of a large number of letters she received from Canadian citizens supporting her belief that what is being done for Canada's Indigenous People is not effective. Towards the end of December 2017, Beyak faced considerable social media backlash regarding these letters. On January 4, NDP leader Jagmeet Singh demanded Beyak's resignation. In a statement to the media, Conservative leader Andrew Scheer, explained that while most letters focused on the history of residential schools, some letters had comments regarding Indigenous Canadians in general. He pointed out a particularly troubling passage from one of the letters, that stated "I'm no anthropologist but it seems every opportunistic culture, subsistence hunter/gatherers seeks to get what they can for no effort. There is always a clash between an industrial/organized farming culture that values effort as opposed to a culture that will sit and wail until the government gives them stuff", calling the comment "simply racist" and her promotion of such comments "offensive and unacceptable".

In a media statement, Scheer said that he removed Beyak from the Conservative caucus after she refused his demand that she remove some of the comments. Scheer's spokesperson said this demand was made in a telephone call, but Beyak denied that Scheer, anyone from his office, or the Senate leadership had asked her to take down a letter. A senior Conservative source confirmed Beyak's account. Following a Senate inquiry, it was determined that Beyak had breached the Ethics and Conflict of Interest Code for Senators by posting letters on her Senate website that contained racist content. She was ordered to remove the racist letters from her Senate website, to make a formal apology for posting the letters in question, and to complete a cultural sensitivity course with an emphasis on Indigenous issues. She subsequently refused to remove the letters, and was suspended from the Senate in April, 2019 for the remainder of the parliamentary session.

=== Second suspension ===
In January 2020, the Standing Committee on Ethics and Conflict of Interest for Senators again recommended that Beyak be suspended without pay for the remainder of the parliamentary session, citing her failure to adequately complete anti-racism training. During her anti-racism training sessions, Beyak was alleged to have said that she identified as Métis because her parents adopted an Indigenous child, a statement which prompted the Métis National Council to demand an apology and suggest Beyak resign. Subsequently, Beyak issued a Press Release stating "Media are reporting I am Metis, and although the Metis are a great nation I am not, have never been and never will be Metis, and have never said I was, at anytime, anywhere to anyone."

On February 27, 2020, the Senate imposed a second suspension on Beyak because of her failure to complete the required training. The senators approved a report from the standing committee on ethics and conflicts of interest which recommended that Beyak be suspended without pay for "the rest of the current term". In addition to her suspension, she was ordered to undertake anti-racism training. Canada's standing senate Committee on Internal Economy, Budgets and Administration (CIBA) met February 27, 2020 to formally remove Beyak from the senate payroll. Her suspension ended on August 18, 2020, when the session was prorogued.

== Illicit donation to Republican National Committee ==
According to filings from the United States Federal Election Commission, Beyak donated US$300 in May 2020 to the Republican National Committee in support of Donald Trump's re-election campaign. Beyak listed her residence as Dryden, New York and her occupation as retired, despite still being a sitting member of the Senate and living in Dryden, Ontario. The Federal Election Campaign Act does not allow foreign nationals without American citizenship or permanent resident status to contribute to political candidates or campaigns. Beyak's office claimed that the donation was made in error, and that the money was being refunded. However, as of October 2020, the Republican National Committee did not report the return of the donation.

== Personal life ==
She married Tony Beyak on November 28, 1970, and they remained married until his death on April 8, 2002. They have two sons.
