= 21st Parliament of Ontario =

The 21st Legislative Assembly of Ontario was convened following the 1943 Ontario general election and was in session from August 4, 1943, until March 24, 1945, just prior to the 1945 general election. The Ontario Progressive Conservative Party, formerly the Ontario Conservative Party, led by George Drew formed a minority government. The Liberals, having lost seats to both the Conservatives and the Co-operative Commonwealth Federation, fell to third place.

William James Stewart served as speaker for the assembly.

== Members of the Assembly ==
Riding	Member	Party	First elected / previously elected	No. of terms
Addington	John Abbott Pringle	Progressive Conservative	1943	1st term
Algoma—Manitoulin	Wilfred Lynn Miller	Liberal	1934	3rd term
Beaches	Thomas Alexander Murphy	Progressive Conservative	1926	5th term
Bellwoods	Albert Alexander MacLeod	Labour-Progressive	1943	1st term
Bracondale	Rae Luckock	Co-operative Commonwealth	1943	1st term
Brant	Harry Corwin Nixon	Liberal	1919	7th term
Brantford	Charles Strange	Co-operative Commonwealth	1943	1st term
Bruce	Thomas Neil Duff	Liberal	1943	1st term
Carleton	Adam Holland Acres	Progressive Conservative	1923	6th term
Cochrane North	John Joseph Kehoe	Co-operative Commonwealth	1943	1st term
Cochrane South	Bill Grummett	Co-operative Commonwealth	1943	1st term
Dovercourt	William Duckworth	Progressive Conservative	1934	3rd term
Dufferin—Simcoe	Alfred Wallace Downer	Progressive Conservative	1937	2nd term
Durham	Reginald Percival Vivian	Progressive Conservative	1943	1st term
Eglinton	Leslie Egerton Blackwell	Progressive Conservative	1943	1st term
Elgin	Mitchell Frederick Hepburn	Independent-Liberal	1934	3rd term
Essex North	Arthur Nelson Alles	Co-operative Commonwealth	1943	1st term
Essex South	William Murdoch	Progressive Conservative	1943	1st term
Fort William	Garfield Anderson	Co-operative Commonwealth	1943	1st term
Glengarry	Edmund MacGillivray	Liberal	1937	2nd term
Grenville—Dundas	George Holmes Challies	Progressive Conservative	1929	4th term
Grey North	Roland Patterson	Liberal	1934	3rd term
Grey South	Farquhar Robert Oliver	Liberal	1926 (Note: First elected as United Farmers)	5th term
Haldimand—Norfolk	Wallace William Walsh	Progressive Conservative	1943	1st term
Haldimand—Norfolk	Charles Hammond Martin (1944)	Progressive Conservative	1944	1st term
Halton	Stanley Leroy Hall	Progressive Conservative	1943	1st term
Hamilton Centre	Robert Desmond Thornberry	Co-operative Commonwealth	1943	1st term
Hamilton East	William Herbert Connor	Co-operative Commonwealth	1943	1st term
Hamilton—Wentworth	Frederick Wilson Warren	Co-operative Commonwealth	1943	1st term
Hastings East	Roscoe Robson	Progressive Conservative	1943	1st term
Hastings West	Richard Duke Arnott	Progressive Conservative	1937	2nd term
High Park	George Alexander Drew	Progressive Conservative	1938	2nd term
Huron	Robert Hobbs Taylor	Progressive Conservative	1943	1st term
Huron—Bruce	John William Hanna	Progressive Conservative	1943	1st term
Kenora	William Manson Docker	Co-operative Commonwealth	1943	1st term
Kent East	Wesley Gardiner Thompson	Progressive Conservative	1943	1st term
Kent West	Arthur St. Clair Gordon	Liberal	1934	3rd term
Kingston	Harry Allan Stewart	Progressive Conservative	1943	1st term
Lambton East	Robert Roy Downie	Liberal	1943	1st term
Lambton West	Harry Steel	Co-operative Commonwealth	1943	1st term
Lanark	George Henry Doucett	Progressive Conservative	1937	2nd term
Leeds	Walter Bain Reynolds	Progressive Conservative	1937	2nd term
Lincoln	Charles Daley	Progressive Conservative	1943	1st term
London	William Gourlay Webster	Progressive Conservative	1943	1st term
Middlesex North	Thomas L. Patrick	Progressive Conservative	1943	1st term
Middlesex South	Daniel McIntyre	Progressive Conservative	1943	1st term
Muskoka—Ontario	James Francis Kelly	Liberal	1934	3rd term
Niagara Falls	Cyril Arthur Goodwin Overall	Co-operative Commonwealth	1943	1st term
Nipissing	Arthur Allen Casselman	Co-operative Commonwealth	1943	1st term
Northumberland	William Arthur Goodfellow	Progressive Conservative	1943	1st term
Ontario	Arthur Henry Williams	Co-operative Commonwealth	1943	1st term
Ottawa East	Robert Laurier	Liberal	1940	2nd term
Ottawa South	George Harrison Dunbar	Progressive Conservative	1937	2nd term
Oxford	Thomas Roy Dent	Progressive Conservative	1943	1st term
Parkdale	William James Stewart	Progressive Conservative	1938	2nd term
Parry Sound	Elmer Roy Smith	Co-operative Commonwealth	1934	3rd term
Peel	Thomas Laird Kennedy	Progressive Conservative	1919, 1937	6th term*
Perth	William Angus Dickson	Liberal	1934	3rd term
Peterborough	Harold Robinson Scott	Progressive Conservative	1943	1st term
Port Arthur	Frederick Oliver Robinson	Co-operative Commonwealth	1943	1st term
Prescott	Aurélien Bélanger	Liberal	1923, (Note: Russell) 1934	5th term*
Prince Edward—Lennox	James de Congalton Hepburn	Progressive Conservative	1937	2nd term
Rainy River	George Edward Lockhart	Co-operative Commonwealth	1943	1st term
Renfrew North	Stanley Joseph Hunt	Progressive Conservative	1943	1st term
Renfrew South	Thomas Patrick Murray	Liberal	1929	4th term
Riverdale	Leslie Emery Wismer	Co-operative Commonwealth	1943	1st term
Russell	Romeo Bégin	Liberal	1937	2nd term
Sault Ste. Marie	George Isaac Harvey	Co-operative Commonwealth	1943	1st term
Simcoe Centre	George Graham Johnston	Progressive Conservative	1943	1st term
Simcoe East	John Duncan McPhee	Progressive Conservative	1943	1st term
St. Andrew	Joseph Baruch Salsberg	Labour-Progressive	1943	1st term
St. David	William David Dennison	Co-operative Commonwealth	1943	1st term
St. George	Dana Harris Porter	Progressive Conservative	1943	1st term
St. Patrick	Archibald Kelso Roberts	Progressive Conservative	1943	1st term
Stormont	John Lawrence McDonald	Progressive Conservative	1943	1st term
Sudbury	Robert Hugh Carlin	Co-operative Commonwealth	1943	1st term
Timiskaming	Calvin Howard Taylor	Co-operative Commonwealth	1943	1st term
Victoria	Leslie Miscampbell Frost	Progressive Conservative	1937	2nd term
Waterloo North	John Henry Cook	Co-operative Commonwealth	1943	1st term
Waterloo South	Leonard Grieve Robinson	Co-operative Commonwealth	1943	1st term
Welland	Howard Elis Brown	Co-operative Commonwealth	1943	1st term
Wellington North	Ross Atkinson McEwing	Liberal	1937	2nd term
Wellington South	Leslie Hancock	Co-operative Commonwealth	1943	1st term
Wentworth	William Robertson	Co-operative Commonwealth	1943	1st term
Windsor—Sandwich	George Bennett	Co-operative Commonwealth	1943	1st term
Windsor—Walkerville	William Charles Riggs	Co-operative Commonwealth	1943	1st term
Woodbine	Bertram Elijah Leavens	Co-operative Commonwealth	1943	1st term
York East	Agnes Campbell MacPhail	Co-operative Commonwealth	1943	1st term
York North	George Herbert Mitchell	Co-operative Commonwealth	1943	1st term
York South	Edward Bigelow Jolliffe	Co-operative Commonwealth	1943	1st term
York West	Charles Hibbert Millard	Co-operative Commonwealth	1943	1st term

== Timeline ==
21st Legislative Assembly of Ontario - Movement in seats held (1943-1945)
Party	1943	Gain/(loss) due to		1945
Party	1943	Death in office	Byelection hold	1945
Progressive Conservative	38	(1)	1	38
Co-operative Commonwealth	34			34
Liberal	15			15
Labor–Progressive	2			2
Independent-Liberal	1			1
Total	90	(1)	1	90

Changes in seats held (1943–1945)
Seat	Before				Change		
Seat	Date	Member	Party	Reason	Date	Member	Party
Haldimand—Norfolk	February 9, 1944	Wallace William Walsh	█ PC	Died in office	March 20, 1944	Charles Hammond Martin	█ PC
