= Gord Miller (politician) =

Canadian politician (1924–2021)

Ontario MPP
- In office 1975–1990
- Preceded by: Jim Allan
- Succeeded by: Norm Jamison
- Constituency: Norfolk

Personal details
- Born: February 26, 1924 Jarvis, Ontario, Canada
- Died: February 23, 2021 (aged 96) Jarvis, Ontario, Canada
- Party: Liberal
- Spouse(s): Reta Mae Johnson (m. May 28, 1949–Sept 10 1973); Shirley June Earl (m. Feb. 14, 1976-Feb 11 2017)
- Children: 4
- Occupation: Farmer

Gordon Irwin Miller (February 26, 1924 – February 23, 2021) was a politician in Ontario, Canada. He served in the Legislative Assembly of Ontario as a Liberal from 1975 to 1990.

== Background ==
Miller was educated in Jarvis and worked as a farmer. Miller's son Doug was a candidate of the Ontario Liberal Party in 1999 in the riding of Haldimand—Norfolk—Brant.

== Politics ==
He was a school trustee from 1960 to 1967, a councillor from 1968 to 1971, a reeve from 1971 to 1973 and a regional councillor from 1973 to 1975.

He was elected to the Ontario legislature in the 1975 provincial election, defeating Progressive Conservative Jim Allan by 1,955 votes in the rural riding of Haldimand—Norfolk. He was re-elected by a greater margin in the 1977 election, and again in 1981, 1985 and 1987.

He was defeated in the 1990 provincial election, losing to NDP candidate Norm Jamison by almost 4,000 votes.
