= Frank Woods Callaghan =

Chief Justice of the Ontario Court (General Division)
- In office 1990–1994
- Succeeded by: Roy McMurtry

Chief Justice of the High Court of Justice
- In office 1989–1990
- Succeeded by: Position abolished

Associate Chief Justice of the High Court of Justice
- In office 1985–1989

Personal details
- Occupation: Lawyer; Judge

Frank Woods Callaghan was a Canadian jurist who served as Chief Justice of the High Court of Justice and subsequently as Chief Justice of the Ontario Court (General Division). He had a distinguished judicial career spanning over three decades and was regarded as one of the leading figures in Ontario's judiciary.

== Judicial career ==
Callaghan was appointed to the High Court of Justice in 1979. He served in this capacity until 1985, when he was elevated to Associate Chief Justice of the High Court of Justice, a position he held until 1989.

In 1989, Callaghan was appointed Chief Justice of the High Court of Justice. Following the reorganisation of Ontario's court system in 1990, he became Chief Justice of the Ontario Court (General Division), serving in this role until 1994.

Prior to his judicial appointments, Callaghan served as Deputy Attorney General of Ontario under Attorney General Roy McMurtry. McMurtry later praised Callaghan, describing him as being "committed to the maintenance of integrity as the hallmark of the justice system".

== Legacy ==
Callaghan was remembered as one of the "giants of the judiciary" who held senior leadership positions in the courts that preceded the modern Superior Court of Justice. He was particularly noted for his commitment to the principle of judicial circuiting, ensuring that judges served throughout the province rather than remaining in the same communities, which he believed was essential for the proper administration of justice.

The Frank W. Callaghan Memorial Moot at the University of Toronto Faculty of Law is named in his memory. This annual moot court competition brings together law students to argue cases in the areas of criminal or constitutional law.

== See also ==
- Superior Court of Justice (Ontario)
- List of Ontario judges
