= Hastings West (provincial electoral district) =

Ontario electoral district

Defunct provincial electoral district
- Legislature: Legislative Assembly of Ontario
- District created: 1867
- District abolished: 1966
- First contested: 1867
- Last contested: 1963

Hastings West was an electoral riding in Ontario, Canada. It was created in 1867 at the time of confederation. It was abolished in 1966 before the 1967 election into Hastings and Quinte.

== Members of Provincial Parliament ==
Hastings West
Assembly	Years	Member	Party
1st	1867–1871	Ketchum Graham	Conservative
2nd	1871–1874	Ketchum Graham	Conservative
3rd	1875–1879	Thomas Wills	Conservative
4th	1879–1882	Alexander Robertson	Conservative
4th	1882–1883	Baltis Rose	Conservative
5th	1883–1886	Ephraim George Sills	Liberal
6th	1886–1890	Gilbert Wellington Ostrom	Conservative
7th	1890–1894	William Hodgins Biggar	Liberal
8th	1894–1898	William Hodgins Biggar	Liberal
9th	1898–1902	Marshall Bidwell Morrison	Conservative
10th	1902–1904	Marshall Bidwell Morrison	Conservative
11th	1905–1908	Marshall Bidwell Morrison	Conservative
12th	1908–1911	John Wesley Johnson	Conservative
13th	1911–1914	John Wesley Johnson	Conservative
14th	1914–1919	John Wesley Johnson	Conservative
15th	1919–1923	William Henry Ireland	Conservative
16th	1923–1926	William Henry Ireland	Conservative
17th	1926–1929	William Henry Ireland	Conservative
18th	1929–1934	William Henry Ireland	Conservative
19th	1934–1937	James Albert Faulkner	Liberal
20th	1937–1943	Richard Duke Arnott	Conservative
21st	1943–1945	Richard Duke Arnott	Conservative
22nd	1945–1948	James Frederick Wilson	Progressive Conservative
23rd	1948–1951	Elmer Sandercock	Progressive Conservative
24th	1951–1955	Elmer Sandercock	Progressive Conservative
25th	1955–1959	Elmer Sandercock	Progressive Conservative
26th	1959–1963	Elmer Sandercock	Progressive Conservative
27th	1963–1967	Elmer Sandercock	Progressive Conservative
Sourced from the Ontario Legislative Assembly
Merged into Hastings and Quinte riding before the 1967 election

== Election results ==
1963 Ontario general election
Party	Candidate	Votes	%	±%
Progressive Conservative	Elmer Sandercock	11,146	53.85	–5.21
Liberal	Frank Follwell	8,848	42.75	+7.63
New Democratic	Ian E. Reilly	704	3.40	–2.42
Total valid votes		20,698	99.32	
Total rejected ballots		142	0.68	–0.47
Turnout		20,840	67.36	+9.04
Eligible voters		30,938		
Progressive Conservative hold		Swing		–6.42
Source: Elections Ontario

1959 Ontario general election
Party	Candidate	Votes	%	±%
Progressive Conservative	Elmer Sandercock	10,384	59.06	–1.89
Liberal	Jack Lundberg	6,175	35.12	+3.04
Co-operative Commonwealth	Fred Brethour	1,023	5.82	–1.15
Total valid votes		17,582	98.85	
Total rejected ballots		204	1.15	–0.27
Turnout		17,786	58.32	–5.35
Eligible voters		30,498		
Progressive Conservative hold		Swing		–2.47
Source: Elections Ontario

1955 Ontario general election
Party	Candidate	Votes	%	±%
Progressive Conservative	Elmer Sandercock	11,017	60.95	+5.59
Liberal	Irvine McGaughey	5,798	32.08	–5.66
Co-operative Commonwealth	William C. Mundrey	1,259	6.97	+0.07
Total valid votes		18,074	98.59	
Total rejected ballots		259	1.41	–0.20
Turnout		18,333	63.67	–7.07
Eligible voters		28,796		
Progressive Conservative hold		Swing		+5.62
Source: Elections Ontario

1951 Ontario general election
Party	Candidate	Votes	%	±%
Progressive Conservative	Elmer Sandercock	10,299	55.37	+4.52
Liberal	Angus B. Duffy	7,020	37.74	+6.16
Co-operative Commonwealth	Ernest Gibbs	1,283	6.90	–10.67
Total valid votes		18,602	98.39	
Total rejected ballots		305	1.61	+0.61
Turnout		18,907	70.74	+8.86
Eligible voters		26,728		
Progressive Conservative hold		Swing		–0.82
Source: Elections Ontario

1948 Ontario general election
Party	Candidate	Votes	%	±%
Progressive Conservative	Elmer Sandercock	8,501	50.85	+0.02
Liberal	Bernard William Hughes	5,280	31.58	–3.43
Co-operative Commonwealth	Clare Albert Ridley	2,937	17.57	+3.41
Total valid votes		16,718	98.99	
Total rejected ballots		170	1.01	–0.03
Turnout		16,888	61.88	–6.91
Eligible voters		27,293		
Progressive Conservative hold		Swing		+1.72
Source: Elections Ontario

1945 Ontario general election
Party	Candidate	Votes	%	±%
Progressive Conservative	James Frederick Wilson	9,351	50.83	+2.93
Liberal	Harry Raymond Cory	6,441	35.01	+4.88
Co-operative Commonwealth	Frank Haffey	2,604	14.16	–7.81
Total valid votes		18,396	98.97	
Total rejected ballots		192	1.03	+0.02
Turnout		18,588	68.79	+8.38
Eligible voters		27,021		
Progressive Conservative hold		Swing		–0.98
Source: Elections Ontario

1943 Ontario general election
Party	Candidate	Votes	%	±%
Progressive Conservative	Richard Duke Arnott	6,530	47.91	–5.65
Liberal	Roscoe Vanderwater	4,107	30.13	–16.31
Co-operative Commonwealth	Douglas Waldron Bewes	2,994	21.96	–
Total valid votes		13,631	98.99	
Total rejected ballots		139	1.01	–0.34
Turnout		13,770	60.42	–15.94
Eligible voters		22,792		
Progressive Conservative hold		Swing		+5.33
Source: Elections Ontario

1937 Ontario general election
Party	Candidate	Votes	%	±%
Conservative	Richard Duke Arnott	9,923	53.56	+6.82
Liberal	James Albert Faulkner	8,604	46.44	–6.82
Total valid votes		18,527	98.65	
Total rejected ballots		253	1.35	+0.36
Turnout		18,780	76.36	–3.66
Eligible voters		24,595		
Conservative gain from Liberal		Swing		+6.82
Source: Elections Ontario

1934 Ontario general election
Party	Candidate	Votes	%	±%
Liberal	James Albert Faulkner	9,627	53.26	+19.46
Conservative	William Henry Ireland	8,448	46.74	–19.46
Total valid votes		18,075	99.01	
Total rejected ballots		181	0.99	+0.15
Turnout		18,256	80.01	+23.89
Eligible voters		22,816		
Liberal gain from Conservative		Swing		+19.46
Source: Elections Ontario

1929 Ontario general election
Party	Candidate	Votes	%	±%
Conservative	William Henry Ireland	5,304	66.20	+4.25
Liberal	George Holton	2,708	33.80	–
Total valid votes		8,012	99.16	
Total rejected ballots		68	0.84	+0.10
Turnout		8,080	56.13	–14.41
Eligible voters		14,396		
Conservative hold		Swing		+2.12
Source: Elections Ontario

1926 Ontario general election
Party	Candidate	Votes	%	±%
Conservative	William Henry Ireland	6,273	61.96	+1.91
Prohibitionist	Harry W. Ackerman	3,852	38.04	–
Total valid votes		10,125	99.26	
Total rejected ballots		76	0.75	–0.25
Turnout		10,201	70.54	+19.46
Eligible voters		14,462		
Conservative hold		Swing		+0.95
Source: Elections Ontario

1923 Ontario general election
Party	Candidate	Votes	%	±%
Conservative	William Henry Ireland	4,846	60.05	+7.86
Liberal	Edward Duckett O'Flynn	3,224	39.95	–7.86
Total valid votes		8,070	99.01	
Total rejected ballots		81	0.99	–2.23
Turnout		8,151	51.08	–23.72
Eligible voters		15,957		
Conservative hold		Swing		+7.86
Source: Elections Ontario

1919 Ontario general election
Party	Candidate	Votes	%	±%
Conservative	William Henry Ireland	5,072	52.19	–10.48
Liberal	Edward Duckett O'Flynn	4,647	47.81	–
Total valid votes		9,719	96.77	
Total rejected ballots		324	3.23	+2.75
Turnout		10,043	74.80	–2.47
Eligible voters		13,427		
Conservative hold		Swing		–5.24
Source: Elections Ontario

1914 Ontario general election
Party	Candidate	Votes	%	±%
Conservative	John Wesley Johnson	2,347	62.67	–
Independent	David Volume Sinclair	1,398	37.33	–
Total valid votes		3,745	99.52	
Total rejected ballots		18	0.48	–
Turnout		3,763	77.27	–
Eligible voters		4,870		
Conservative hold		Swing		–
Source: Elections Ontario

1911 Ontario general election
Party	Candidate	Votes
Conservative	John Wesley Johnson	acclaimed
Source: Elections Ontario

1908 Ontario general election
Party	Candidate	Votes	%	±%
Conservative	John Wesley Johnson	1,882	52.41	–5.05
Liberal	Henry Pringle	1,709	47.59	+5.05
Total valid votes		3,591	98.22	
Total rejected ballots		65	1.78	+0.85
Turnout		3,656	81.15	+12.23
Eligible voters		4,505		
Conservative hold		Swing		–5.05
Source: Elections Ontario

1905 Ontario general election
Party	Candidate	Votes	%	±%
Conservative	Marshall Bidwell Morrison	2,018	57.46	+2.80
Liberal	Henry Pringle	1,494	42.54	–2.80
Total valid votes		3,512	99.07	
Total rejected ballots		33	0.93	–0.13
Turnout		3,545	68.93	+4.59
Eligible voters		5,143		
Conservative hold		Swing		+2.80
Source: Elections Ontario

1902 Ontario general election
Party	Candidate	Votes	%	±%
Conservative	Marshall Bidwell Morrison	1,884	54.66	+1.99
Liberal	Ephraim George Sills	1,563	45.34	–1.99
Total valid votes		3,447	98.94	
Total rejected ballots		37	1.06	+0.48
Turnout		3,484	64.34	–3.10
Eligible voters		5,415		
Conservative hold		Swing		+1.99
Source: Elections Ontario

1898 Ontario general election
Party	Candidate	Votes	%	±%
Conservative	Marshall Bidwell Morrison	1,985	52.67	–
Liberal	Harry G. Bleecker	1,784	47.33	–4.08
Total valid votes		3,769	99.42	
Total rejected ballots		22	0.58	+0.06
Turnout		3,791	67.44	+11.39
Eligible voters		5,621		
Conservative gain from Liberal		Swing		+2.04
Source: Elections Ontario

1894 Ontario general election
Party	Candidate	Votes	%	±%
Liberal	William Hodgins Biggar	1,473	51.41	–0.70
Independent	Robert James Graham	1,392	48.59	–
Total valid votes		2,865	99.48	
Total rejected ballots		15	0.52	–0.43
Turnout		2,880	56.05	–8.36
Eligible voters		5,138		
Liberal hold		Swing		–0.35
Source: Elections Ontario

1890 Ontario general election
Party	Candidate	Votes	%	±%
Liberal	William Hodgins Biggar	1,678	52.11	+3.95
Conservative	Gilbert Wellington Ostrom	1,542	47.89	–3.95
Total valid votes		3,220	99.05	
Total rejected ballots		31	0.95	–0.17
Turnout		3,251	64.41	–0.09
Eligible voters		5,047		
Liberal gain from Conservative		Swing		+3.95
Source: Elections Ontario

1886 Ontario general election
Party	Candidate	Votes	%	±%
Conservative	Gilbert Wellington Ostrom	1,681	51.83	+2.31
Liberal	Ephraim George Sills	1,562	48.17	–2.31
Total valid votes		3,243	98.87	
Total rejected ballots		37	1.13	+0.76
Turnout		3,280	64.50	+3.44
Eligible voters		5,085		
Conservative gain from Liberal		Swing		+2.31
Source: Elections Ontario

1883 Ontario general election
Party	Candidate	Votes	%	±%
Liberal	Ephraim George Sills	1,217	50.48	+7.88
Conservative	Baltis Rose	1,194	49.52	–7.88
Total valid votes		2,411	99.63	
Total rejected ballots		9	0.37	+0.37
Turnout		2,420	61.06	–
Eligible voters		3,963		
Liberal gain from Conservative		Swing		+7.88
Source: Elections Ontario

Ontario provincial by-election, October 18, 1882 Alexander Robertson resigned to contest the federal election
Party	Candidate	Votes	%	±%
Conservative	Baltis Rose	1,008	57.40	+4.38
Liberal	Mr. Lee	748	42.60	–4.38
Total valid votes		1,756	100.00	
Total rejected ballots		–		
Turnout		1,756	–	–
Eligible voters				
Conservative hold		Swing		+4.38
Source: Elections Ontario

Ontario provincial by-election, January 30, 1880 Void election
Party	Candidate	Votes	%	±%
Conservative	Alexander Robertson	1,306	53.02	–3.58
Liberal	Ephraim George Sills	1,157	46.98	+3.58
Total valid votes		2,463	100.00	
Total rejected ballots		–		
Turnout		2,463	–	–
Eligible voters				
Conservative hold		Swing		–3.58
Source: Elections Ontario

1879 Ontario general election
Party	Candidate	Votes	%	±%
Conservative	Alexander Robertson	1,402	56.60	+19.73
Liberal	H. Holden	1,075	43.40	+11.91
Total valid votes		2,477	68.92	+2.99
Eligible voters		3,594		
Conservative hold		Swing		+3.91
Source: Elections Ontario

1875 Ontario general election
Party	Candidate	Votes	%
Conservative	Thomas Wills	720	36.87
Independent	Ketchum Graham	618	31.64
Liberal	J. Lewis	615	31.49
Turnout		1,953	65.94
Eligible voters		2,962	
Conservative hold			
Source: Elections Ontario

1871 Ontario general election
Party	Candidate	Votes
Conservative	Ketchum Graham	Acclaimed
Source: Elections Ontario

1867 Ontario general election
Party	Candidate	Votes	%
Conservative	Ketchum Graham	940	72.92
Liberal	J.J. Farley	349	27.08
Total valid votes		1,289	54.50
Eligible voters		2,365	
Conservative pickup new district.			
Source: Elections Ontario
