= James Frederick Wilson =

Canadian politician from Ontario

Member of the Ontario Provincial Parliament for Hastings West
- In office June 4, 1945 – April 27, 1948
- Preceded by: Richard Duke Arnott
- Succeeded by: Elmer Sandercock

Personal details
- Party: Progressive Conservative

James Frederick Wilson was a Canadian politician who was Progressive Conservative MPP for Hastings West from 1945 to 1948.

== See also ==
- 22nd Parliament of Ontario
