= Alvin Coulter McLean =

Canadian politician from Ontario

Member of the Ontario Provincial Parliament for Eglinton
- In office September 30, 1929 – April 3, 1934
- Preceded by: Herbert Henry Ball
- Succeeded by: Harold James Kirby

Personal details
- Party: Conservative

Alvin Coulter McLean was a Canadian politician from the Conservative Party of Ontario. He represented Eglinton in the Legislative Assembly of Ontario from 1929 to 1934.

He served in World War I as a lieutenant in the Canadian Expeditionary Force.

== See also ==
- 18th Parliament of Ontario
