= Richard Coulter =

Richard Coulter may refer to:

== People ==
- Richard Coulter (U.S. politician) (1788–1852), U.S. Representative from Pennsylvania
- Richard Coulter (general) (1827–1908), American Civil War general
- Richard Coulter Jr. (1870–1955), World War I general and banker

== Other uses ==
- SS Richard Coulter, a Liberty ship built in the United States during World War II

== See also ==
- Richard Coulter Drum (1825–1909), United States Army general
- Richard Samuel Colter (1878–1950), Canadian lawyer and politician
