= William Henry Ireland (politician) =

Ontario MPP
- In office 1919–1934
- Preceded by: John Wesley Johnson
- Succeeded by: James Albert Faulkner
- Constituency: Hastings West

Personal details
- Born: October 4, 1883 Trenton, Ontario, Canada
- Died: April 22, 1962 (aged 78) Trenton, Ontario, Canada
- Party: Conservative
- Spouse: Mabel Adam (m. 1908)
- Occupation: Merchant

William Henry Ireland (October 4, 1883 – April 22, 1962) was an Ontario merchant and political figure. He represented Hastings West in the Legislative Assembly of Ontario from 1919 to 1934 as a Conservative member.

He was born in Trenton, Ontario, the son of William H. Ireland. In 1908, he married Mabel Adam. Ireland was mayor of Trenton from 1916 to 1919. He died at Trenton in 1962.
