= Eglinton (provincial electoral district) =

Former provincial electoral district in Ontario, Canada

Ontario electoral district
- Eglinton, in relation to the other Toronto ridings, after the 1926 redistribution.

Defunct provincial electoral district
- Legislature: Legislative Assembly of Ontario
- District created: 1925
- District abolished: 1996
- First contested: 1926
- Last contested: 1995

Eglinton was a provincial electoral district located in Toronto, Ontario, Canada. From 1926 until 1999 it elected members to the Legislative Assembly of Ontario. At its abolishment in 1999 it consisted of the neighbourhoods of Davisville and Lawrence Park in the north end of the old city of Toronto. It was abolished into Eglinton—Lawrence, Don Valley West and St. Paul's.

== Members of Provincial Parliament ==
Eglinton
Assembly	Years	Member	Party
created in 1926 from parts of York West and York East ridings
17th	1926–1929	Herbert Ball	Conservative
18th	1929–1934	Alvin Coulter McLean	Conservative
19th	1934–1937	Harold Kirby (Note: In 1938, the title of Member of the Legislative Assembly was officially changed to Member of Provincial Parliament. Previously, it was unofficially used in the media and in the Legislature.)	Liberal
20th	1937–1943	Harold Kirby	Liberal
21st	1943–1945	Leslie Blackwell	Progressive Conservative
22nd	1945–1948	Leslie Blackwell	Progressive Conservative
23rd	1948–1951	Leslie Blackwell	Progressive Conservative
24th	1951–1955	William Dunlop (Note: Died in office February 2, 1961.)	Progressive Conservative
25th	1955–1959	William Dunlop	Progressive Conservative
26th	1959–1961	William Dunlop	Progressive Conservative
26th	1962–1963	Leonard Reilly	Progressive Conservative
27th	1963–1967	Leonard Reilly	Progressive Conservative
28th	1967–1971	Leonard Reilly	Progressive Conservative
29th	1971–1975	Leonard Reilly	Progressive Conservative
30th	1975–1977	Roy McMurtry	Progressive Conservative
31st	1977–1981	Roy McMurtry	Progressive Conservative
32nd	1981–1985	Roy McMurtry	Progressive Conservative
33rd	1985–1987	David James McFadden	Progressive Conservative
34th	1987–1990	Dianne Poole	Liberal
35th	1990–1995	Dianne Poole	Liberal
36th	1995–1999	Bill Saunderson	Progressive Conservative
Sourced from the Ontario Legislative Assembly
Merged into Eglinton—Lawrence, Don Valley West and St. Paul's ridings after 1999

== Election results ==
=== 1987–1999 electoral boundaries ===
1995 Ontario general election
Party	Candidate	Votes	%	±%
Progressive Conservative	Bill Saunderson	17,496	48.82	+13.37
Liberal	Dianne Poole	12,904	36.00	+0.04
New Democratic	Adam Di Carlo	4,597	12.83	–10.41
Green	Daniel King	395	1.10	–2.90
Natural Law	Linda Martin	325	0.91	–
Independent	Fernand Deschamps	123	0.34	–
Total valid votes		35,840	99.38	
Total rejected, unmarked and declined ballots		225	0.62	–0.48
Turnout		36,065	73.65	+3.67
Eligible voters		48,965		
Progressive Conservative gain from Liberal		Swing		+6.66
Source: Elections Ontario

1990 Ontario general election
Party	Candidate	Votes	%	±%
Liberal	Dianne Poole	12,032	35.97	–8.77
Progressive Conservative	Ann Vanstone	11,859	35.45	–7.23
New Democratic	Jay Waterman	7,772	23.23	+12.01
Green	Daniel King	1,340	4.01	–
Libertarian	Scott Bell	448	1.34	+0.38
Total valid votes		33,451	98.90	
Total rejected, unmarked and declined ballots		372	1.10	+0.49
Turnout		33,823	69.98	+2.36
Eligible voters		48,330		
Liberal hold		Swing		–0.77
Source: Elections Ontario

1987 Ontario general election
Party	Candidate	Votes	%	±%
Liberal	Dianne Poole	15,106	44.74	+4.09
Progressive Conservative	David James McFadden	14,411	42.68	–0.92
New Democratic	Michael T. Lee	3,789	11.22	–4.54
Libertarian	Richard Lubbock	324	0.96	–
Independent	John Stifel	137	0.41	–
Total valid votes		33,767	99.39	
Total rejected ballots		207	0.61	–0.12
Turnout		33,974	67.62	+0.30
Eligible voters		50,239		
Liberal gain from Progressive Conservative		Swing		+2.50
Source: Elections Ontario

=== 1974–1987 electoral boundaries ===
1985 Ontario general election
Party	Candidate	Votes	%	±%
Progressive Conservative	David James McFadden	13,503	43.60	–21.32
Liberal	Dianne Poole	12,589	40.65	+19.71
New Democratic	John A. Goodfellow	4,880	15.76	+3.34
Total valid votes		30,972	99.27	
Total rejected ballots		229	0.73	–0.08
Turnout		31,201	67.32	+9.59
Eligible voters		46,346		
Progressive Conservative hold		Swing		–20.52
Source: Elections Ontario

1981 Ontario general election
Party	Candidate	Votes	%	±%
Progressive Conservative	Roy McMurtry	17,386	64.92	+5.32
Liberal	Keith Polson	5,606	20.93	–2.24
New Democratic	Eileen B. Elmy	3,324	12.41	–2.65
Libertarian	Angelo R. Cosentini	466	1.74	+0.56
Total valid votes		26,782	99.18	
Total rejected ballots		221	0.82	+0.32
Turnout		27,003	57.73	–10.53
Eligible voters		46,776		
Progressive Conservative hold		Swing		+3.78
Source: Elections Ontario

1977 Ontario general election
Party	Candidate	Votes	%	±%
Progressive Conservative	Roy McMurtry	19,213	59.60	+8.62
Liberal	Sean McCann	7,471	23.17	–9.79
New Democratic	Eileen B. Elmy	4,857	15.07	+0.68
Libertarian	Linda Cain	382	1.18	+0.40
Independent	John Stifel	315	0.98	–
Total valid votes		32,238	99.50	
Total rejected ballots		163	0.50	+0.00
Turnout		32,401	68.25	–0.54
Eligible voters		47,471		
Progressive Conservative hold		Swing		+9.20
Source: Elections Ontario

1975 Ontario general election
Party	Candidate	Votes	%	±%
Progressive Conservative	Roy McMurtry	16,679	50.97	–6.08
Liberal	Frank Judge	10,785	32.96	+4.11
New Democratic	Eileen B. Elmy	4,706	14.38	+0.80
Social Credit	Angel Ann Harris	295	0.90	–
Libertarian	Donald Redekop	256	0.78	–
Total valid votes		32,721	99.50	
Total rejected ballots		165	0.50	+0.15
Turnout		32,886	68.80	–10.02
Eligible voters		47,801		
Progressive Conservative hold		Swing		–5.09
Source: Elections Ontario

=== 1966–1974 electoral boundaries ===
1971 Ontario general election
Party	Candidate	Votes	%	±%
Progressive Conservative	Leonard Mackenzie Reilly	20,242	57.06	+2.82
Liberal	Hugh Morris	10,237	28.85	–1.05
New Democratic	Robert A. Imlay	4,819	13.58	–2.27
Independent	Robert McDonald Wales	180	0.51	–
Total valid votes		35,478	99.64	
Total rejected ballots		127	0.36	–0.12
Turnout		35,605	78.82	+0.94
Eligible voters		45,172		
Progressive Conservative hold		Swing		+1.94
Source: Elections Ontario

1967 Ontario general election
Party	Candidate	Votes	%	±%
Progressive Conservative	Leonard Mackenzie Reilly	15,220	54.24	–0.98
Liberal	Michael Miller	8,393	29.91	–6.11
New Democratic	Peter Morgan	4,449	15.85	+7.09
Total valid votes		28,062	99.52	
Total rejected ballots		134	0.48	–0.44
Turnout		28,196	77.88	+10.35
Eligible voters		36,205		
Progressive Conservative hold		Swing		+2.56
Source: Elections Ontario

=== 1934–1966 ===
1963 Ontario general election
Party	Candidate	Votes	%	±%
Progressive Conservative	Leonard Mackenzie Reilly	18,371	55.22	+10.47
Liberal	Jean Newman	11,982	36.02	–8.60
New Democratic	Tom Stevens	2,916	8.76	–1.87
Total valid votes		33,269	99.09	
Total rejected ballots		306	0.91	–0.40
Turnout		33,575	67.53	+12.81
Eligible voters		49,718		
Progressive Conservative hold		Swing		+9.53
Source: Elections Ontario

Ontario provincial by-election, January 18, 1962 Death of William James Dunlop
Party	Candidate	Votes	%	±%
Progressive Conservative	Leonard Mackenzie Reilly	11,390	44.75	–12.60
Liberal	Jean Newman	11,355	44.61	+14.18
New Democratic	Eamonn Martin	2,707	10.64	–1.58
Total valid votes		25,452	98.69	
Total rejected ballots		339	1.31	+0.41
Turnout		25,791	54.72	+2.79
Eligible voters		47,133		
Progressive Conservative hold		Swing		–13.39
Source: Elections Ontario

1959 Ontario general election
Party	Candidate	Votes	%	±%
Progressive Conservative	William James Dunlop	14,805	57.35	+1.66
Liberal	Alex C. Thompson	7,855	30.43	–4.33
Co-operative Commonwealth	Jack Inman	3,153	12.21	+3.78
Total valid votes		25,813	99.10	
Total rejected ballots		235	0.90	–0.47
Turnout		26,048	51.93	–7.02
Eligible voters		50,156		
Progressive Conservative hold		Swing		+3.00
Source: Elections Ontario

1955 Ontario general election
Party	Candidate	Votes	%	±%
Progressive Conservative	William James Dunlop	15,954	55.70	–9.50
Liberal	David Anderson	9,958	34.76	+13.63
Co-operative Commonwealth	Godfrey Roy Begley	2,417	8.44	–5.23
Independent	George Rolland	315	1.10	–
Total valid votes		28,644	98.63	
Total rejected ballots		398	1.37	+0.36
Turnout		29,042	58.95	–8.01
Eligible voters		49,262		
Progressive Conservative hold		Swing		–11.56
Source: Elections Ontario

1951 Ontario general election
Party	Candidate	Votes	%	±%
Progressive Conservative	William James Dunlop	21,876	65.20	+13.58
Liberal	Frank L. Nash	7,093	21.14	–4.23
Co-operative Commonwealth	Walker S. Parker	4,585	13.66	–9.35
Total valid votes		33,554	98.99	
Total rejected ballots		341	1.01	+0.22
Turnout		33,895	66.97	–2.19
Eligible voters		50,613		
Progressive Conservative hold		Swing		+8.90
Source: Elections Ontario

1948 Ontario general election
Party	Candidate	Votes	%	±%
Progressive Conservative	Leslie Blackwell	18,767	51.62	–12.10
Liberal	Fred R. Duncan	9,224	25.37	+9.63
Co-operative Commonwealth	Ronald C. Monkman	8,366	23.01	+5.23
Total valid votes		36,357	99.22	
Total rejected ballots		287	0.78	+0.09
Turnout		36,644	69.16	–9.44
Eligible voters		52,982		
Progressive Conservative hold		Swing		–10.87
Source: Elections Ontario

1945 Ontario general election
Party	Candidate	Votes	%	±%
Progressive Conservative	Leslie Blackwell	26,115	63.72	+13.49
Co-operative Commonwealth	Ray A. Ruggles	7,285	17.78	–6.77
Liberal	Edwin Rush	6,450	15.74	–9.48
Labor–Progressive	Reginald A. McLean	1,132	2.76	–
Total valid votes		40,982	99.30	
Total rejected ballots		287	0.70	+0.19
Turnout		41,269	78.60	+19.65
Eligible voters		52,504		
Progressive Conservative hold		Swing		+10.13
Source: Elections Ontario

1943 Ontario general election
Party	Candidate	Votes	%	±%
Progressive Conservative	Leslie Blackwell	13,832	50.23	+5.11
Liberal	Harold James Kirby	6,945	25.22	–23.53
Co-operative Commonwealth	Russell Jonathan Gee	6,759	24.55	+18.42
Total valid votes		27,536	99.50	
Total rejected ballots		139	0.50	–0.55
Turnout		27,675	58.95	–12.13
Eligible voters		46,948		
Progressive Conservative gain from Liberal		Swing		+14.32
Source: Elections Ontario

1937 Ontario general election
Party	Candidate	Votes	%	±%
Liberal	Harold James Kirby	14,809	48.75	+2.25
Conservative	Leslie Blackwell	13,705	45.12	+4.78
Co-operative Commonwealth	T. Leslie Teeter	1,861	6.13	–
Total valid votes		30,375	98.95	
Total rejected ballots		322	1.05	+0.31
Turnout		30,697	71.07	+3.05
Eligible voters		43,190		
Liberal hold		Swing		+3.51
Source: Elections Ontario

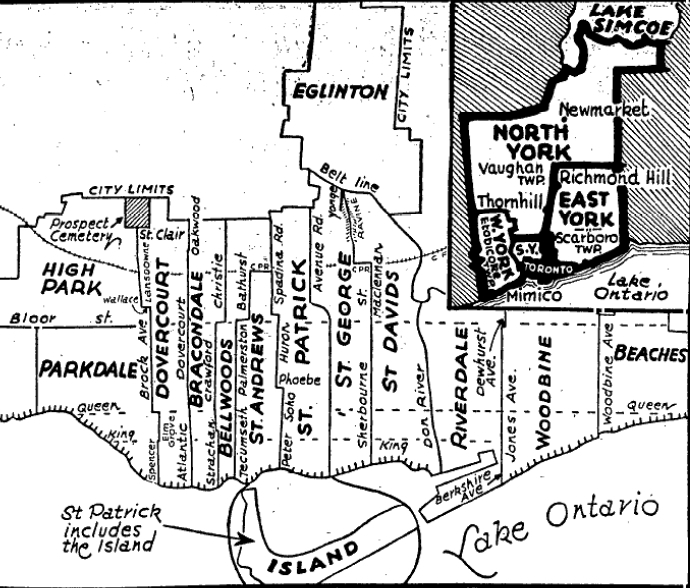
Toronto riding boundaries after 1934 redistribution

1934 Ontario general election
Party	Candidate	Votes	%	±%
Liberal	Harold James Kirby	12,556	46.51	+5.81
Conservative	Alvin Coulter McLean	10,891	40.34	–18.96
Independent	George Albert Little	3,287	12.17	–
Independent Workers	John McGonnell	158	0.59	–
Independent Liberal	Raymond F. Mack	107	0.40	–
Total valid votes		26,999	99.26	
Total rejected ballots		201	0.74	+0.02
Turnout		27,200	68.03	+20.64
Eligible voters		39,984		
Liberal gain from Conservative		Swing		+12.39
Source: Elections Ontario

=== 1926–1934 electoral boundaries ===
1929 Ontario general election
Party	Candidate	Votes	%	±%
Conservative	Alvin Coulter McLean	10,009	59.30	–2.42
Liberal	Harold James Kirby	6,869	40.70	+2.42
Total valid votes		16,878	99.28	
Total rejected ballots		122	0.72	+0.36
Turnout		17,000	47.39	–30.64
Eligible voters		35,871		
Conservative hold		Swing		–2.42
Source: Elections Ontario

1926 Ontario general election
Party	Candidate	Votes	%
Conservative	Herbert Henry Ball	10,230	61.73
Liberal	Francis Albert Magee	6,343	38.27
Total valid votes		16,573	99.64
Total rejected ballots		60	0.36
Turnout		16,633	78.03
Eligible voters		21,316	
Conservative pickup new district.			
Source: Elections Ontario

== See also ==
- List of Ontario provincial electoral districts
- Canadian provincial electoral districts
