= Ephraim George Sills =

Canadian politician

Ontario MPP
- In office 1883–1886
- Preceded by: Baltis Rose
- Succeeded by: George Wellington Ostrom
- Constituency: Hastings West

Personal details
- Born: April 18, 1836 Fredericksburgh Township, Lennox County, Upper Canada
- Died: April 4, 1909 (aged 72) Belleville, Ontario
- Party: Liberal
- Spouse: Sarah Crichton Muir (m. 1876)
- Occupation: Businessman

Ephraim George Sills (April 18, 1836 – April 4, 1909) was an Ontario businessman and political figure. He represented Hastings West in the Legislative Assembly of Ontario from 1883 to 1886 as a Liberal member.

He was born in Fredericksburgh Township, Lennox County and educated in Picton. With his brother, Sills owned a sawmill, gristmill and paper mill in Frankford. In 1876, he married Sarah Crichton Muir. He served as reeve for Sidney Township. Sills was an unsuccessful candidate for Hastings West in the 1886 general election. He died in 1909.
