= Marshall Bidwell Morrison =

Canadian politician

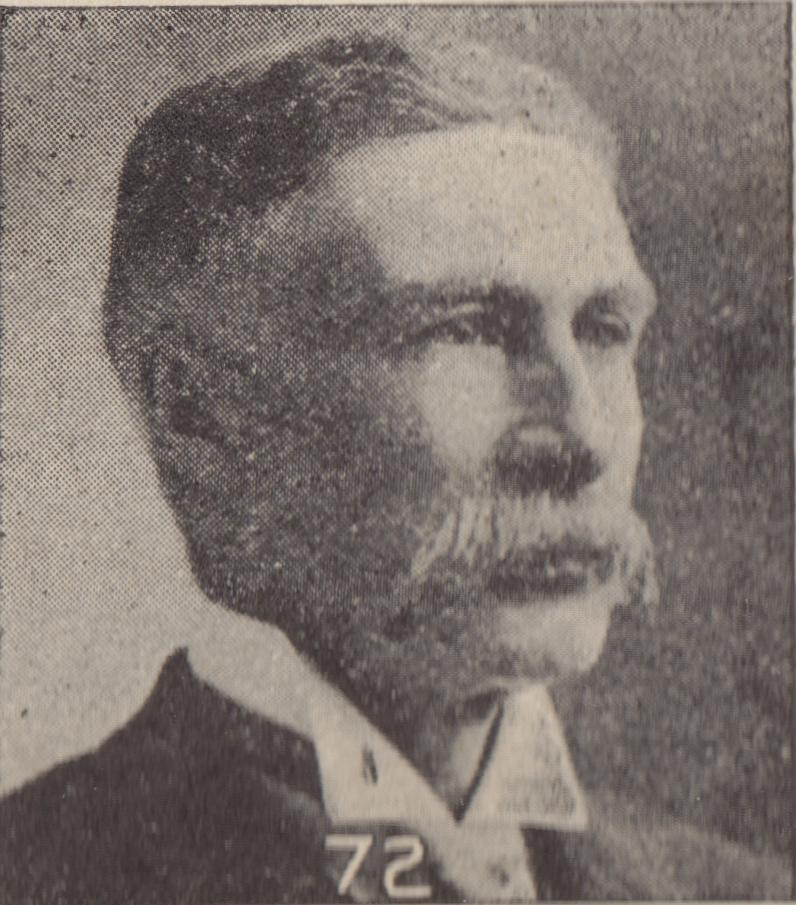

Ontario MPP
- In office 1898–1908
- Preceded by: William Hodgins Biggar
- Succeeded by: John Wesley Johnson
- Constituency: Hastings West

Personal details
- Born: December 31, 1848 Consecon, Prince Edward County
- Died: March 9, 1923 (aged 74) Belleville, Ontario
- Party: Conservative
- Spouse: Eleanor Kinney
- Occupation: Undertaker

Marshall Bidwell Morrison (December 31, 1848 – March 9, 1923) was an undertaker and politician in Ontario, Canada. He represented Hastings West in the Legislative Assembly of Ontario from 1898 to 1908 as a Conservative member.

The son of John Wesley Morrison and Sarah Ann Lampson, he was born in Consecon in Prince Edward County and was educated there. Morrison married Eleanor Kinney. He served on the town council for Trenton for ten years and was Trenton mayor from 1888 to 1889 and from 1895 to 1898. Morrison served in the county militia during the Fenian raids. He died in Belleville, Ontario in 1923.
