= Baltis Rose =

Canadian politician

Ontario MPP
- In office 1882–1883
- Preceded by: Alexander Robertson
- Succeeded by: Ephraim George Sills
- Constituency: Hastings West

Personal details
- Born: January 5, 1817 Sidney Township, Upper Canada
- Died: February 14, 1897 (aged 80) Sidney Township, Ontario
- Party: Conservative
- Spouse: Harriet Irvine
- Occupation: Farmer

Baltis Rose (January 5, 1817 – February 14, 1897) was a farmer and political figure in Ontario. He represented Hastings West in the Legislative Assembly of Ontario from 1882 to 1883 as a Conservative member.

He was born in Sidney Township, the son of Jacob Rose and Gabella Fulton. After completing his schooling, Rose worked on a number of farms in the region. He then leased farmland for eight years and saved enough money to be able to purchase his own farm. He married Harriet Irvine. Rose was reeve for Sidney Township and also served as warden for Hastings County. He was elected to the assembly in an 1882 by-election held after Alexander Robertson resigned his seat to run for a seat in the House of Commons. He died in Sidney Township in 1897.
