= Alexander Robertson (Canadian politician) =

Canadian politician

Member of Parliament for Hastings West
- In office 1882–1888
- Preceded by: James Brown
- Succeeded by: Henry Corby, Jr.

Ontario MPP
- In office 1879–1882
- Preceded by: Thomas Wills
- Succeeded by: Baltis Rose
- Constituency: Hastings West

Personal details
- Born: December 5, 1838 Trenton, Upper Canada
- Died: February 29, 1888 (aged 49) Ottawa, Ontario
- Party: Conservative
- Spouse: Mary Georgina Stewart (m. 1870)

Alexander Robertson (December 5, 1838 – February 29, 1888) was a lawyer and political figure in Ontario, Canada. He represented Hastings West provincially in the Legislative Assembly of Ontario from 1879 to 1882 and Hastings West federally in the House of Commons of Canada from 1882 to 1888 as a Conservative member.

He was born in Trenton, Upper Canada, the son of William Robertson, a Scottish-born lumber merchant. He was educated in Belleville, went on to study law, was called to the bar in 1864 and set up practice in Belleville. Robertson served on the Belleville town council from 1864 to 1869 and was Belleville's mayor in 1870 and from 1878 to 1879. He served as a captain in the militia during the Fenian raids. He married Mary Georgina Stewart in 1870. In 1882, he resigned his seat in the provincial assembly to run for a seat in the House of Commons. Robertson was a prominent member of the Masonic order. He died in office in 1888.

== Electoral history ==
1879 Ontario general election: Hastings West
Party	Candidate	Votes	%	±%
Conservative	Alexander Robertson	1,402	56.60	+19.73
Liberal	H. Holden	1,075	43.40	+11.91
Total valid votes		2,477	68.92	+2.99
Eligible voters		3,594		
Conservative hold		Swing		+3.91
Source: Elections Ontario
