= James Albert Faulkner =

Canadian politician (1877–1944)

Ontario MPP
- In office 1934–1937
- Preceded by: William Henry Ireland
- Succeeded by: Richard Duke Arnott
- Constituency: Hastings West

Personal details
- Born: October 7, 1877 Stirling, Ontario
- Died: April 27, 1944 (aged 66) Toronto, Ontario
- Party: Liberal
- Spouse: Mabel Adam (m. 1908)
- Education: McMaster University (Arts, 1900); McGill University (Medicine, 1904)
- Occupation: Doctor

James Albert Faulkner (October 7, 1877 – April 27, 1944) was a Canadian medical practitioner, public servant and a cabinet Minister in the Ontario government.

== Background ==
Faulkner was born in Stirling, Ontario and was of United Empire Loyalist heritage. Initially graduating from McMaster University in 1900 with a degree in arts, he went to McGill University for further education in medicine and graduated in 1904. He set up his medical practice at Foxboro, Ontario and stayed there until 1918 when he moved to Belleville. He served as the Medical Officer of Health for Thurlow Township for 27 years.

== Politics ==
In 1934 he ran for the Liberal Party of Ontario in Hastings West, a predominantly Conservative riding, and was elected to the Legislative Assembly of Ontario. He served as Minister of Health in Mitchell Hepburn's government until the 1937 general election, where he was unable to be reelected.

During his time as Minister, he was noted for being active in the fight against cancer, mental disabilities and streptococcal infections. In 1935, he became involved in the controversy over the Essiac herbal compound, arranging for Frederick Banting to evaluate its claims relating to cancer therapy, but Rene Caisse (Essiac's promoter) refused to cooperate.

=== Cabinet positions ===
Hepburn ministry, Province of Ontario (1934–1942)
Cabinet post (1)
Predecessor	Office	Successor
John Robb	Minister of Health; 1934-1937	Harold Kirby

== Later life ==
Faulkner was later appointed as chairman of the Old Age Pension and Mothers' Allowance Board. He died in 1944 at the Toronto General Hospital following a brief illness.
