= Arthur Campbell Burt =

Canadian politician

Arthur Burt

Ontario MPP
- In office 1931–1934
- Preceded by: Arthur Clarence Pratt
- Succeeded by: Riding abolished
- Constituency: Norfolk

Personal details
- Born: November 17, 1892 Simcoe, Ontario
- Died: May 6, 1950 (aged 57) Simcoe, Ontario
- Party: Conservative
- Spouse: Vira Celia Foster (m. 1916)
- Occupation: Veterinarian

Arthur Campbell Burt (November 17, 1892 – April 6, 1950) was a veterinarian and political figure in Ontario. He represented Norfolk in the Legislative Assembly of Ontario from 1931 to 1934 as a Conservative member.

Burt was educated at the Veterinary College in Toronto. In 1916, he married Vira Celia Foster.

Burt was elected to the assembly in a 1931 by-election held following the death of John Strickler Martin. He served as president of the Norfolk County Fair in 1946. Burt died in Simcoe at the age of 58.
