= Ketchum Graham =

Canadian politician (1831–1889)

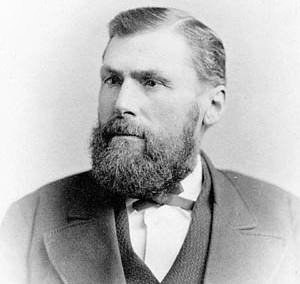

Ontario MPP
- In office 1867–1874
- Preceded by: Riding established
- Succeeded by: Thomas Wills
- Constituency: Hastings West

Personal details
- Born: December 19, 1831 Sidney Township, Upper Canada
- Died: March 9, 1889 (aged 57) Sidney Township, Ontario
- Party: Conservative
- Occupation: Farmer

Robert James Ketchum Graham (December 19, 1831 – March 9, 1889) was a political figure from Ontario. He represented Hastings West in the Legislative Assembly of Ontario as a Conservative member from 1867 to 1874.

He was the son of a Scottish immigrant, James Graham. He served as reeve of Sidney Township from 1865 to 1867.

== Electoral history ==
1867 Ontario general election: Hastings West
Party	Candidate	Votes	%
Conservative	Ketchum Graham	940	72.92
Liberal	J.J. Farley	349	27.08
Total valid votes		1,289	54.50
Eligible voters		2,365	
Conservative pickup new district.			
Source: Elections Ontario

1871 Ontario general election: Hastings West
Party	Candidate	Votes
Conservative	Ketchum Graham	Acclaimed
Source: Elections Ontario

1875 Ontario general election: Hastings West
Party	Candidate	Votes	%
Conservative	Thomas Wills	720	36.87
Independent	Ketchum Graham	618	31.64
Liberal	J. Lewis	615	31.49
Turnout		1,953	65.94
Eligible voters		2,962	
Conservative hold			
Source: Elections Ontario
