= David James McFadden =

Canadian politician (born 1945)

David McFadden KC
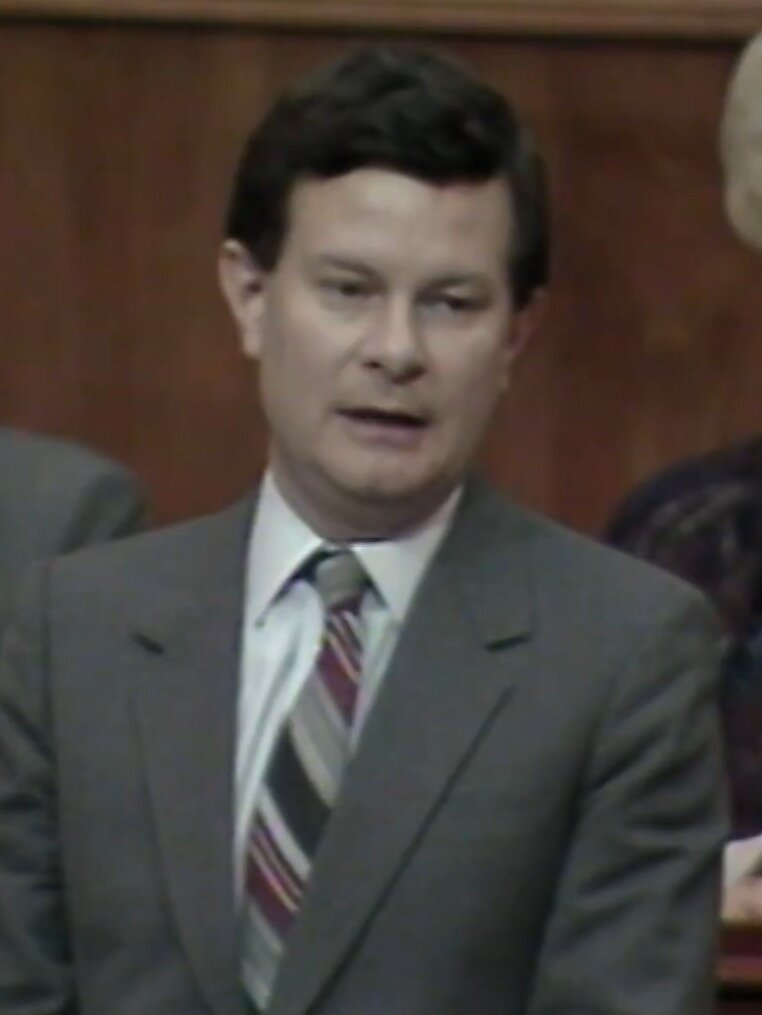
- McFadden in 1986

Ontario MPP
- In office 1985–1987
- Preceded by: Roy McMurtry
- Succeeded by: Dianne Poole
- Constituency: Eglinton

Personal details
- Born: December 7, 1945 (age 80) Thunder Bay, Ontario
- Party: Progressive Conservative
- Profession: Lawyer

David James McFadden KC (born December 7, 1945) is a lawyer and former politician in Ontario, Canada. He was a Progressive Conservative Party member of the Legislative Assembly of Ontario from 1985 to 1987 who represented the midtown Toronto riding of Eglinton.

== Background ==
McFadden was born in Thunder Bay. He was educated at the University of Toronto, and at the Osgoode Hall Law School at York University. After graduation, he became a partner in the Toronto law firm of McFadden, Marrocco and Parker. He served as vice-president of the Ontario Progressive Conservative Association from 1968 to 1980, and as president from 1980 to 1986. He helped to rebuild the party's grassroots organization in the mid-1970s, and chaired both of the party's leadership conventions in 1985.

== Politics ==
McFadden was elected to the Ontario legislature in the 1985 provincial election defeating Liberal candidate Dianne Poole by 914 votes in Eglinton. The Progressive Conservatives won a minority government in this election, and McFadden briefly served as a backbench supporter of Frank Miller's administration before it was defeated in the house. In opposition, he served as his party's critic for Colleges and Universities, Technology and Trade. He lost to Dianne Poole in the 1987 election by 695 votes.
