= Norm Jamison =

Canadian politician

Ontario MPP
- In office 1990–1995
- Preceded by: Gord Miller
- Succeeded by: Toby Barrett
- Constituency: Norfolk

Personal details
- Born: May 25, 1950 Ireland
- Died: October 3, 2017 (aged 67) Port Rowan, Ontario, Canada
- Party: New Democrat
- Occupation: Steelworker

Norman Johnston Jamison (May 25, 1950 – October 3, 2017) was a politician in Ontario, Canada. He was a New Democratic Party member of the Legislative Assembly of Ontario from 1990 to 1995. He died on October 3, 2017, of liver cancer at the age of 67.

== Background ==
Jamison was president of his student council at Memorial Public School, but did not attend university. He was employed by Stelco for twenty years, and also worked as a representative of the United Way in Norfolk County, Ontario.

== Politics ==
He ran for the Ontario legislature in the 1987 provincial election, but finished almost 9,000 votes behind the Liberal candidate, Gord Miller, in the southwestern Ontario riding of Norfolk.

The NDP won a majority government in the 1990 provincial election, and Jamison was elected over Miller by almost 4,000 votes in a rematch from 1987. He was a parliamentary assistant to the Minister of Industry, Trade and Technology and the Minister of Economic Development and Trade over the next five years.

The NDP were defeated in the 1995 provincial election, and Jamison finished third against the Progressive Conservative Toby Barrett in his bid for re-election.

Jamison left the NDP to join the Liberal Party before the 1999 provincial election, and endorsed the Liberal candidate in the redistributed riding of Haldimand—Norfolk—Brant.

He ran for municipal councillor in Haldimand County in 2000, but was defeated.
