= Thomas Wills (politician) =

Canadian politician

Ontario MPP
- In office 1875–1879
- Preceded by: Ketchum Graham
- Succeeded by: Alexander Robertson
- Constituency: Hastings West

Personal details
- Born: August 2, 1826 Salisbury, England
- Died: March 11, 1907 (aged 80) Hastings, Ontario
- Party: Conservative
- Spouse: Anna Maria Levesconte (m. 1852)

Thomas Wills (August 2, 1826 – March 11, 1907) was an Ontario political figure. He represented Hastings West in the Legislative Assembly of Ontario as a Conservative member from 1875 to 1879.

He was born in Salisbury, England in 1826 (one source indicates that he was born in Newfoundland) and was educated there. In 1852, he married Anna Maria Levesconte. He served as a clerk for Hastings County and was lieutenant-colonel for the local militia. Wills ran unsuccessfully for the same seat in the House of Commons in 1874.

== Electoral history ==
1875 Ontario general election: Hastings West
Party	Candidate	Votes	%
Conservative	Thomas Wills	720	36.87
Independent	Ketchum Graham	618	31.64
Liberal	J. Lewis	615	31.49
Turnout		1,953	65.94
Eligible voters		2,962	
Conservative hold			
Source: Elections Ontario
