= Bill Saunderson =

Canadian politician (1933–2026)

The Honourable Bill Saunderson ECO

Ontario MPP
- In office 1995–1999
- Preceded by: Dianne Poole
- Succeeded by: Riding abolished
- Constituency: Eglinton

Personal details
- Born: June 28, 1933 Toronto, Ontario, Canada
- Died: February 24, 2026 (aged 92)
- Party: Progressive Conservative
- Spouse: Meredith Saunderson
- Children: 3 including Brian
- Education: Trinity College, Toronto; University of Ottawa
- Occupation: Investment manager, founded Sceptre Investment Counsel

William John Saunderson (June 28, 1933 – February 24, 2026) was a Canadian politician from the province of Ontario. He was a Progressive Conservative member of the Legislative Assembly of Ontario from 1995 to 1999, and served as a cabinet minister in the government of Mike Harris.

== Background ==
Saunderson was educated at the University of Trinity College in the University of Toronto, receiving a Bachelor of Arts degree and subsequently becoming a certified accountant. He continued his education as an adult and received a PhD from the University of Ottawa in 1994. After graduation, he worked as an accountant with Clarkson and Gordon. He co-founded Sceptre Investment Counsel Ltd. in 1971 and worked with the Ontario Pension Commission from 1972 to 1983. Saunderson also had financial ties to the cigarette industry, which became controversial after he entered political life.

== Politics ==
Saunderson was active in political organization before running for office himself. He took part in fundraising activities for several municipal, provincial and federal campaigns for such figures as Brian Mulroney, Joe Clark, David Crombie and Art Eggleton, and was the financial comptroller for the Progressive Conservative Party of Canada's national election campaigns in 1984 and 1988.

He ran in the riding of Eglinton in the 1995 provincial election, and defeated Liberal incumbent Dianne Poole by about 4,500 votes.

On June 26, 1995, he was appointed Minister of Economic Development, Trade and Tourism in the first cabinet of Mike Harris. In 1997, Saunderson announced that the government would be cutting its spending on Ontario's seven "centres of excellence" by 13%. In October 1997, Harris shuffled his cabinet and Saunderson was dropped from his cabinet post. Saunderson had indicated that he would not be running for re-election in the next campaign. After leaving cabinet, he was named to chair the Ontario International Trade Corporation.

== Later life and death ==
In 1999, he was appointed to the board of directors of the Toronto Symphony Orchestra.

In 2000, Saunderson and his wife established a research chair at the University of Toronto to facilitate studies in brain injuries. In 1988 their daughter had been injured in a bicycling accident after being hit by a car.

In 2006, he supported Jane Pitfield in her bid to become mayor of Toronto.

His son, Brian Saunderson is the MPP for Simcoe—Grey since 2022.

Saunderson died on February 24, 2026, at the age of 92.

Harris ministry, Province of Ontario (1995–2002)
Cabinet post (1)
Predecessor	Office	Successor
Anne Swarbrick	Minister of Economic Development, Trade and Tourism; 1995–1997	Al Palladini
