= Haldimand—Norfolk—Brant (provincial electoral district) =

Former provincial electoral district in Ontario, Canada

Haldimand—Norfolk—Brant was a provincial electoral district in central Ontario, Canada, that elected one Member of the Legislative Assembly of Ontario. It was created in 1999 from Norfolk and Brant—Haldimand. It was abolished in 2004. It was split into Haldimand—Norfolk and Brant.

The riding included all of Norfolk County, plus the town of Haldimand, the townships of Burford, Oakland and Onondaga plus the Indian reserves of New Credit and Six Nations.

== Members of Provincial Parliament ==
1. Toby Barrett, Ontario Progressive Conservative Party (1999–2007)

== Election results ==
2003 Ontario general election
Party	Candidate	Votes	%	±%
Progressive Conservative	Toby Barrett	20,109	46.10	–5.09
Liberal	Rob Esselment	17,151	39.32	–1.20
New Democratic	Prue Steiner	4,720	10.82	+5.07
Green	Graeme Dunn	1,088	2.49	+1.58
Family Coalition	Barra L. Gots	548	1.26	–0.04
Total valid votes		43,616	99.33	
Total rejected, unmarked and declined ballots		295	0.67	–0.20
Turnout		43,911	59.38	–3.24
Eligible voters		73,951		
Progressive Conservative hold		Swing		–1.94
Source: Elections Ontario

1999 Ontario general election
Party	Candidate	Votes	%	±%
Progressive Conservative	Toby Barrett	23,124	51.19	+8.85
Liberal	Doug Miller	18,304	40.52	–4.87
New Democratic	Prue Steiner	2,600	5.76	–6.51
Family Coalition	Barra L. Gots	584	1.29	–
Green	John W. Jaques	413	0.91	–
Natural Law	Stefan Larrass	148	0.33	–
Total valid votes		45,173	99.12	
Total rejected, unmarked and declined ballots		399	0.88	–
Turnout		45,572	62.62	–
Eligible voters		72,772		
Progressive Conservative notional gain from Liberal		Swing		–6.86
Source: Elections Ontario

== See also ==
- List of Ontario provincial electoral districts
- Canadian provincial electoral districts
