= James Allan (Canadian politician) =

Canadian politician

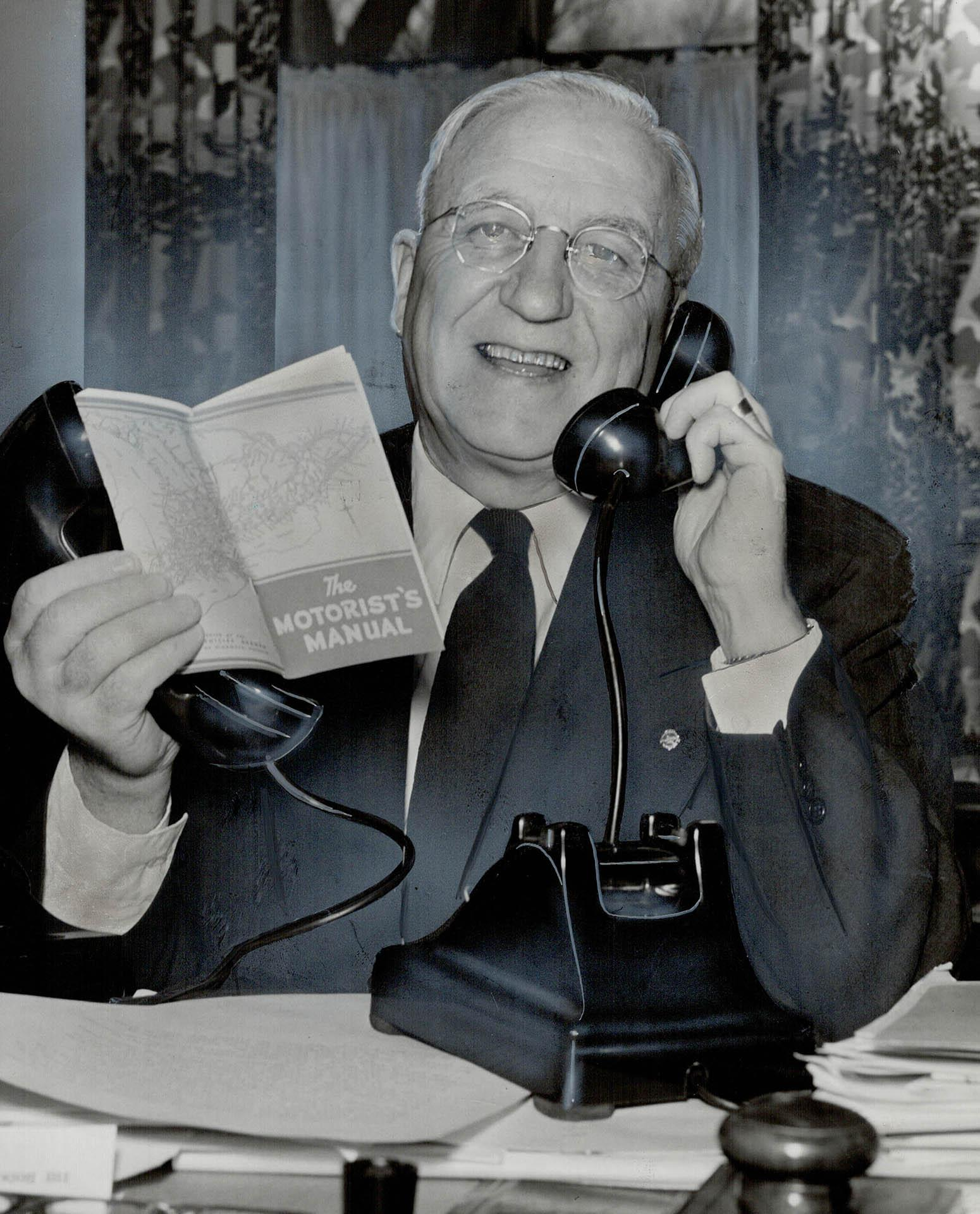
- Allan in 1956

Ontario MPP
- In office 1951–1975
- Preceded by: Charles Martin
- Succeeded by: Gord Miller
- Constituency: Haldimand—Norfolk

Personal details
- Born: James Noble Allan; November 13, 1894; Canborough, Ontario, Canada
- Died: May 9, 1992 (aged 97); Dunnville, Ontario, Canada
- Political party: Progressive Conservative

James Noble Allan (November 13, 1894 – May 9, 1992) was a Canadian politician in Ontario. He was a Progressive Conservative member of the Legislative Assembly of Ontario from 1951 to 1975. He represented the riding of Haldimand—Norfolk. He served as a cabinet minister in the government of Leslie Frost.

== Background ==
Allan was the Grand Master of the Grand Lodge of Ancient Free and Accepted Masons of Canada in the Province of Ontario for the years 1966 and 1967. He also held a Bachelor of Science degree. He died in 1992 at the Haldimand War Memorial Hospital.

== Politics ==
Allan served as Mayor of Dunnville and Warden of Haldimand County along with various other municipal posts.

In the 1951 provincial election, Allan ran as the Progressive Conservative candidate in the riding of Haldimand—Norfolk. He defeated Liberal Elmo Riddle by 2,455 votes. He was re-elected five more times before losing to Liberal Gord Miller in 1975.

In 1955, he was appointed by Ontario Premier Leslie Frost to the cabinet as Minister of Highways. At the time, this was the government's largest department, and Allan oversaw a budget of $200 million. He was in charge of 8,000 employees. During his term, 10,000 miles of highways were built.

In 1958, Allan became Frost's finance minister, and introduced the province's first sales tax, nicknamed the "Frost bite" at a rate of 3%. When Frost retired, Allan ran in the 1961 PC leadership convention, placing fourth.

Allan had the title of Treasurer in the new cabinet of John Robarts until 1966 when he entered semi-retirement at the age of 71 and became a minister without portfolio. He was the last Ontario finance minister to report a budget surplus until the late 1990s. He retired from cabinet altogether in 1968, although he kept his seat in the legislature until retiring from politics altogether following his defeat in the 1975 election.

From 1967 until 1988, Allan served as Chair of the Niagara Parks Commission. On his 90th birthday the Burlington Skyway Bridge was officially renamed the "Burlington Bay James N. Allan Skyway".

=== Cabinet posts ===
Ontario provincial government of John Robarts
Cabinet posts (3)
| Predecessor | Office | Successor |
| Robert Macaulay | Minister of Economics and Development; 1963 (May–October) | Stan Randall |
| New position | Treasurer of Ontario; 1961–1966 | Charles MacNaughton |
Sub-Cabinet Post
| Predecessor | Title | Successor |
| | Minister without portfolio (1966–1968) | |
Ontario provincial government of Leslie Frost
Cabinet posts (3)
| Predecessor | Office | Successor |
| Leslie Frost | Minister, Department of Economics; 1958–1961 | Position abolished |
| William Griesinger | Minister of Public Works; 1958 (May–December) | Ray Connell |
| George Doucett | Minister of Highways; 1955–1958 | Fred Cass |
