= Dianne Poole =

Canadian politician

Ontario MPP
- In office 1987–1995
- Preceded by: David McFadden
- Succeeded by: Bill Saunderson
- Constituency: Eglinton

Personal details
- Born: June 28, 1949 (age 76) Lunenburg, Nova Scotia
- Party: Liberal
- Occupation: Social worker, law clerk

Dianne Poole (born June 28, 1949) is a former politician in Ontario, Canada. She served as a Liberal member of the Legislative Assembly of Ontario from 1987 to 1995.

== Background ==
Poole has a Bachelor of Arts degree in Sociology from Trent University, and was a law clerk and social worker before entering political life. She also served as chair of the Women's Perspective Advisory Committee, and was a member of the French Immersion Task Force of the Toronto Board of Education.

== Politics ==
Poole ran for the Ontario legislature in the 1985 general election, losing to Progressive Conservative David McFadden by 914 votes in the Toronto constituency of Eglinton. She ran again in the 1987 provincial election, and defeated McFadden by 695 votes amid a landslide victory for the Liberals. In 1989, she was appointed as a parliamentary assistant.

The Liberals were defeated by the New Democratic Party in the 1990 provincial election, and Poole was re-elected by only 173 votes over Progressive Conservative candidate Ann Vanstone. She served as the Liberal critic for Housing from 1990 to 1993, and for the JobsOntario program from 1993 to 1995.

In 1994, Poole was one of only three Liberal Member of Provincial Parliament (MPPs), along with Jean Poirier and Tim Murphy, who supported Bill 167, a bill brought forward by the government of Bob Rae to extend spousal benefits to same-sex couples. Poole also called for the Ontario Film Review Board to impose greater restrictions on sexually explicit and violent materials entering the country. She was generally regarded as being on the left wing of the party.

The narrow margin of Poole's victory in 1990 made her constituency a prime PC target in 1995. She lost to Progressive Conservative fundraiser Bill Saunderson by about 4,500 votes, as the Progressive Conservatives won a majority government provincially.

After leaving politics, Poole became the president of Politrain, Inc. She supported Gerard Kennedy for the Liberal Party leadership in 1996.
