= William James Dunlop =

Canadian politician

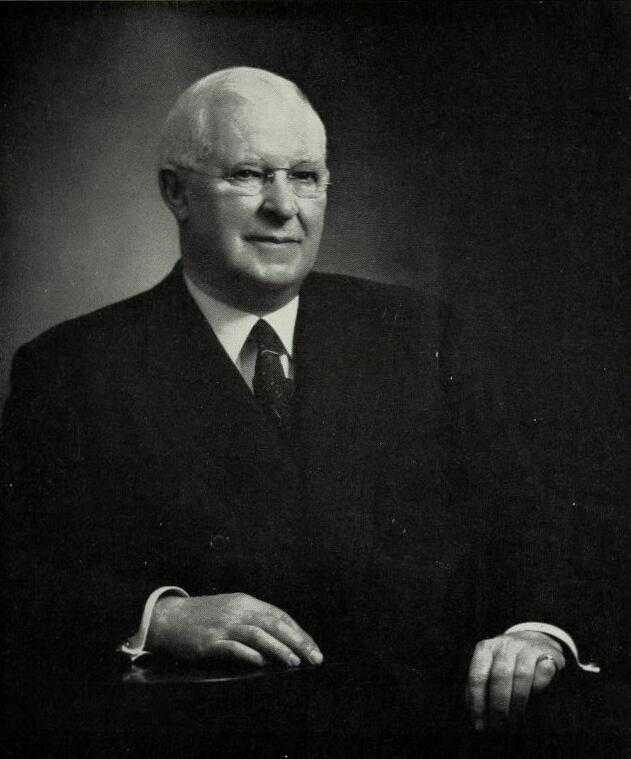
- Dunlop, c. 1951

Minister of Education
- In office October 2, 1951 – December 17, 1959
- Premier: Leslie Frost
- Preceded by: Dana Porter
- Succeeded by: John Robarts

Minister without Portfolio
- In office December 17, 1959 – November 21, 1960
- Premier: Leslie Frost

Member of Provincial Parliament for Eglinton
- In office November 22, 1951 – February 2, 1961
- Preceded by: Leslie Blackwell
- Succeeded by: Leonard Mackenzie Reilly

Personal details
- Born: June 25, 1881 Durham, Ontario, Canada
- Died: February 2, 1961 (aged 79) Toronto, Ontario, Canada
- Party: Progressive Conservative

William James Dunlop (June 24, 1881 – February 2, 1961) was an Ontario teacher and political figure. He represented Eglinton in the Legislative Assembly of Ontario from 1951 to 1961 as a Progressive Conservative member.

== Background ==
He was born in Durham, Ontario, the son of Reverend James Cochrane Dunlop, and later moved to Stayner with his family. He was educated in local schools and also studied in Collingwood, in Clinton, at the University of Toronto and Queen's University. He taught school for a number of years and was principal for schools in Tavistock and Peterborough. He became a member of the faculty of Education at the University of Toronto and also managed a magazine for teachers and the Canadian Historical Review. Dunlop was an instructor for the Canadian Officers Training Corps from 1915 to 1916. He was Director of Extension for the University of Toronto from 1920 to 1951. Dunlop founded the Canadian Association for Adult Education in 1934 and served as its first president. He was also involved in military training during World War II. Dunlop was a Grand Master for the Masonic Lodge in Ontario from 1937 to 1938.

== Politics ==
He served in the provincial cabinet as Minister of Education from 1951 to 1959 and as Minister without Portfolio from 1959 to 1960. He died in office in 1961.

=== Cabinet posts ===
Frost ministry, Province of Ontario (1949–1961)
Cabinet post (1)
Predecessor	Office	Successor
Dana Porter	Minister of Education; 1951-1959	John Robarts
