= Eric William Blake Cross =

Canadian politician

Eric Cross
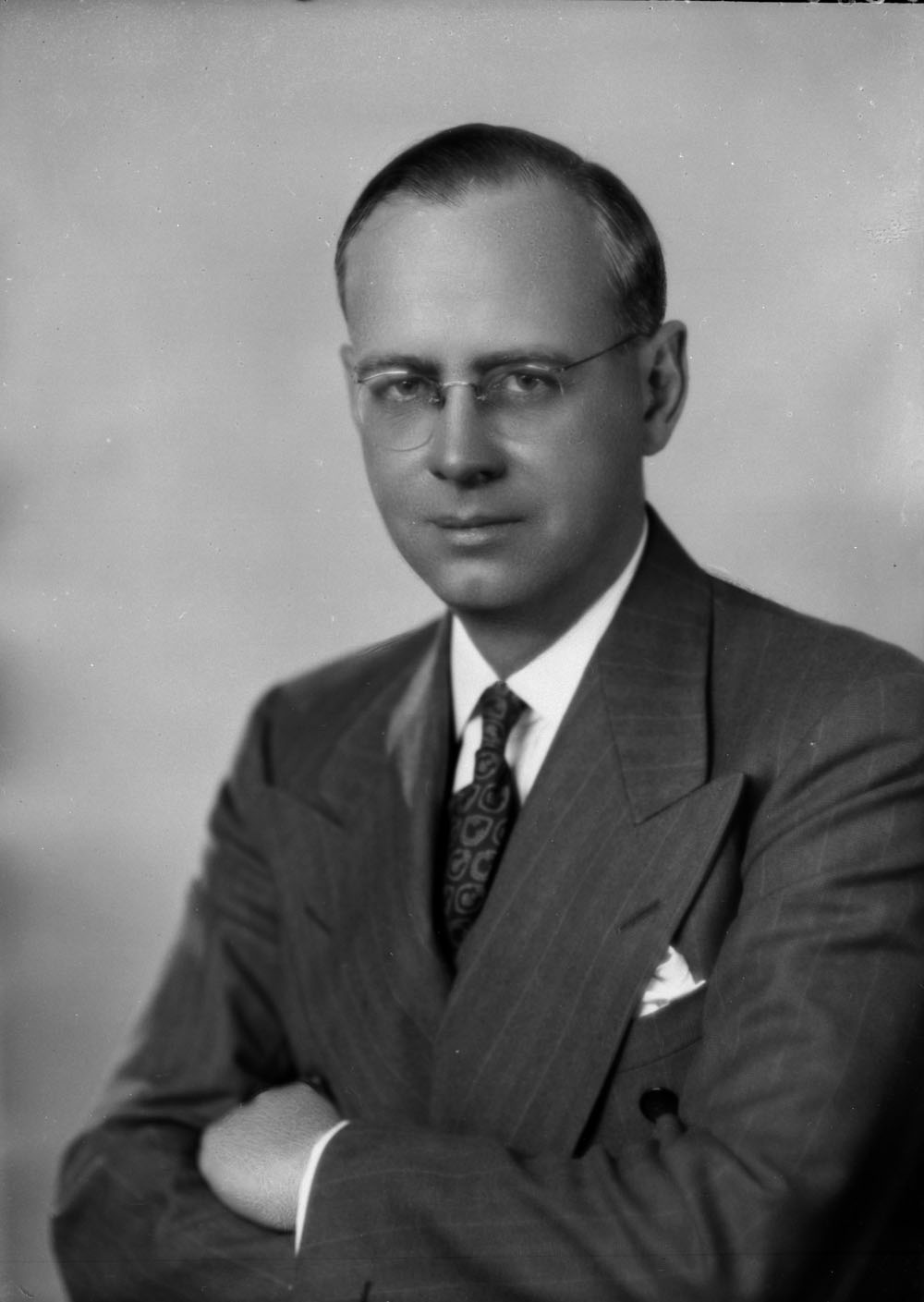
- Cross in 1943

Ontario MPP
- In office 1937–1943
- Preceded by: Richard Colter
- Succeeded by: Wallace William Walsh
- Constituency: Haldimand—Norfolk

Personal details
- Born: January 27, 1904 Madoc, Ontario
- Died: February 25, 1965 (aged 61) Woodstock, Ontario
- Party: Liberal
- Occupation: Lawyer, judge

Eric William Blake Cross (January 27, 1904 – February 25, 1965) was an Ontario judge and political figure. He represented Haldimand—Norfolk in the Legislative Assembly of Ontario from 1937 to 1943 as a Liberal member.

== Background ==
Cross was born in 1904 in Madoc, Ontario. His parents were William Cross and Mary Judith Falls. He also became Chairman of the Ontario Municipal Board. Cross served as a Provincial Magistrate and County Court judge. He died in Woodstock, Ontario at the age of 61, while trying to walk from his stranded car to his home during "the worst snowstorm in 21 years".

== Politics ==
Cross served as Minister of Municipal Affairs and Public Welfare from 1937 to 1940; he was Attorney General and Minister of Municipal Affairs in 1943.

=== Cabinet posts ===
Conant ministry, Province of Ontario (1942–1943)
Cabinet posts (2)
Predecessor	Office	Successor
Thomas McQuesten	Minister of Municipal Affairs; 1943 (May–August)	George Dunbar
Gordon Daniel Conant	Attorney General; 1943 (May–August)	Leslie Blackwell
Hepburn ministry, Province of Ontario (1934–1942)
Cabinet posts (2)
Predecessor	Office	Successor
David Croll	Minister of Municipal Affairs; 1937-1940	Thomas McQuesten
David Croll	Minister of Public Welfare; 1937-1940	Farquhar Oliver
