= Elmer Sandercock =

Canadian politician

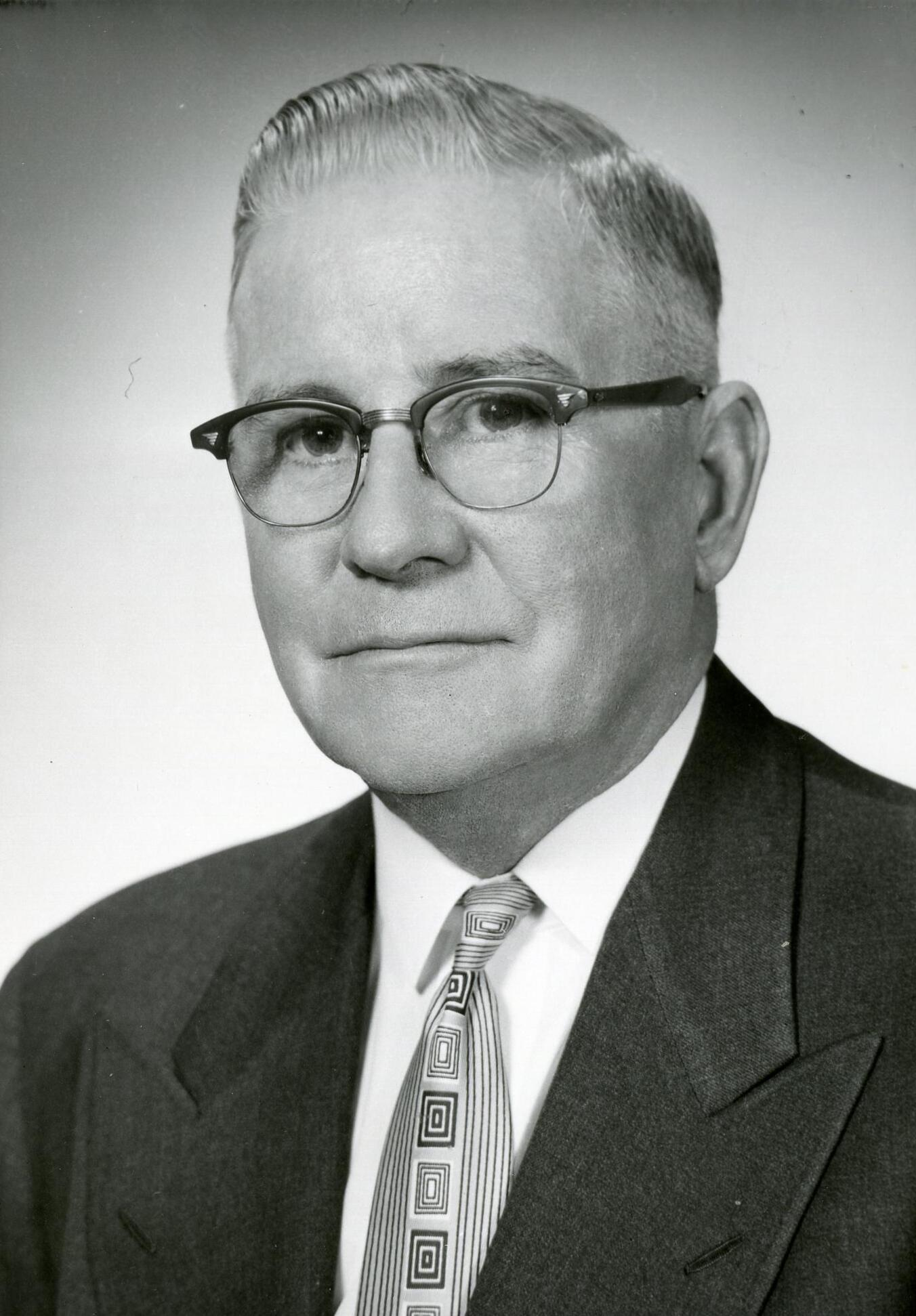
- Sandercock, c. 1967

Ontario MPP
- In office 1948–1967
- Preceded by: James Frederick Wilson
- Succeeded by: Riding abolished
- Constituency: Hastings West

Personal details
- Born: July 29, 1894; Northumberland County, Ontario
- Died: July 25, 1971 (aged 76); Belleville, Ontario
- Political party: Progressive Conservative
- Spouse(s): Beatrice Evelyn Lightle (1918-1922); Ethel Gene Cranston (1924)
- Children: 3
- Occupation: Dairy producer

William Elmer Sandercock (July 29, 1894 – July 25, 1971) was a politician in Ontario, Canada. He was a Progressive Conservative member of the Legislative Assembly of Ontario from 1948 to 1967 who represented the riding of Hastings West.

== Background ==
Sandercock was born in Northumberland County, Ontario in 1894. He was superintendent of a senior care facility in Belleville, Ontario for 20 years. He also served as president of the Belleville Agricultural Society for four years. He married Beatrice Evelyn Lightle (born 1898) on April 25, 1918, in Northumberland County but she died in 1922. He remarried, on November 11, 1924, to Ethel Gene Cranston. The marriage certificate describes Sandercock as a "widower" and "butter maker". He and Ethel raised two daughters and a son.

== Politics ==
First elected in the general election in 1948, Sandercock was re-elected in the general elections in 1951, 1955, 1959, and 1963. He served as a backbench supporter of the Leslie Frost and John Robarts governments and, during each term in office, he served on an average of nine Standing Committees. He retired from politics in 1967 at the age of 72. He died four years later in 1971.
