= Bobbi Ann Brady =

Canadian politician

Bobbi Ann Brady MPP
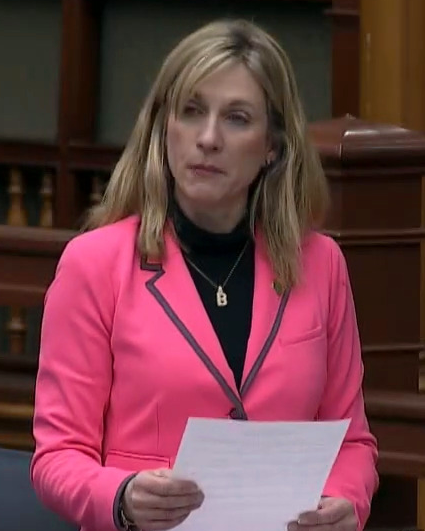
- Brady in 2024

Member of the Ontario Provincial Parliament for Haldimand—Norfolk
- Incumbent
- Assumed office June 2, 2022
- Preceded by: Toby Barrett

Personal details
- Born: 1975/1976 (age 50–51)
- Party: Independent (since 2022)
- Other political affiliations: Progressive Conservative (until 2022)
- Website: www.bobbiannbrady.com

Bobbi Ann Brady MPP (born 1975 or 1976) is a Canadian politician who has represented Haldimand—Norfolk in the Legislative Assembly of Ontario as an independent since 2022.

Prior to her election to the legislature, Brady worked as executive assistant to her predecessor, Progressive Conservative Party of Ontario MPP Toby Barrett. When Barrett announced his retirement, Brady planned to run for the nomination to replace him as the PC candidate, but after the party's central office directly appointed Haldimand County mayor Ken Hewitt as its new candidate without consulting the local electoral district association, Brady opted to run against Hewitt as an independent, with Barrett's endorsement and participation in her campaign.

In the 2025 Ontario general election, she held her seat with 63.7% of the vote; winning by the second-largest margin in the province.

== Electoral history ==
2025 Ontario general election: Haldimand—Norfolk
Party	Candidate	Votes	%	±%	Expenditures
Independent	Bobbi Ann Brady	33,669	63.7	+28.6	
Progressive Conservative	Amy Martin	12,949	24.5	–6.0	
Liberal	Vandan Patel	2,918	5.5	–1.8	
New Democratic	Erica Englert	2,147	4.1	–9.8	
Green	Anna Massinen	821	1.6	–2.5	
New Blue	Garry Tanchak	392	0.7	–2.5	
Total valid votes/expense limit					
Total rejected, unmarked, and declined ballots					
Turnout			54.8	+5.9	
Eligible voters		96,586			
Independent hold		Swing		+17.3	
Source: Elections Ontario

2022 Ontario general election: Haldimand—Norfolk
Party	Candidate	Votes	%	±%	Expenditures
Independent	Bobbi Ann Brady	15,921	35.05		$40,046
Progressive Conservative	Ken Hewitt	13,851	30.49	−26.61	$18,432
New Democratic	Sarah Lowe	6,311	13.89	−13.01	$7,899
Liberal	Aziz Chouhdery	3,329	7.33	−1.87	$0
Ontario Party	Sheldon Simpson	2,353	5.18		$33,280
Green	Erik Coverdale	1,841	4.05	−0.09	$488
New Blue	Nate Hawkins	1,454	3.20		$7,320
Freedom	Thecla Ross	268	0.59	+0.27	$0
Independent	George McMorrow	99	0.22		$0
Total valid votes/expense limit		45,427	99.45	+0.48	$131,173
Total rejected, unmarked, and declined ballots		252	0.55	-0.48	
Turnout		45,679	48.88	-10.32	
Eligible voters		93,693			
Independent gain from Progressive Conservative		Swing		+30.83	
Source(s): "Summary of Valid Votes Cast for Each Candidate" (PDF). Elections Ontario. 2022. Archived from the original on May 18, 2023.; "Statistical Summary by Electoral District" (PDF). Elections Ontario. 2022. Archived from the original on May 21, 2023.
