= Leonard Mackenzie Reilly =

Canadian politician (1912–2008)

Leonard Reilly

Ontario MPP
- In office 1962–1975
- Preceded by: William James Dunlop
- Succeeded by: Roy McMurtry
- Constituency: Eglinton

Personal details
- Born: July 12, 1912 Toronto, Ontario, Canada
- Died: May 21, 2008 (aged 95) Toronto, Ontario, Canada
- Party: Progressive Conservative
- Spouse: Beulah Reilly (m. 1933; died 1978) Jean Reilly (m. 1979)
- Children: 3
- Occupation: Businessman

Leonard Mackenzie Reilly (July 12, 1912 – May 21, 2008) was a Canadian politician for the Ontario PC Party and a businessman.

== Background ==
Reilly was born to Anglican Irish immigrants from County Londonderry, and was the 13th of 16 children of James Reilly (1868-1953) and Mary Jane Whiteside (1874-1946). His family settled in Toronto, Ontario, Canada and ran a grocery store.

Before politics, he was a locksmith, taking on a career after high school and learning from his brother, Allen Gordon Reilly, who had opened Reilly Lock on Yonge Street. He ultimately went on to manage and co-own the business, which grew to become one of the largest locksmithing companies in Toronto, with over 40 employees. Reilly had a keen interest in public speaking and Reilly developed and owned the Reilly Institute of Effective Public Speaking. During the late 1940s and 1950s, Reilly was a Toronto alderman.

== Politics ==
He first entered political life in 1947, running as an aldermanic candidate. He was elected as one of two councillors in Ward 9 in Toronto. He was re-elected as a councillor in 1948, but he lost in 1949 when he attempted to secure one of the four positions on the Board of Control. In 1951, he returned to municipal politics, winning acclamation as a councillor in Ward 9, a position he successfully defended in the elections in 1952, 1953 and 1954. He chose not to run in the 1955 election.

Reilly was first elected to the Ontario legislature in the riding of Eglinton in a by-election on January 18, 1962. The by-election was called to replace William Dunlop who died in office in 1961. He won the seat, barely beating his Liberal opponent, Jean Newman, by 38 votes.

During his term of office he served as the Deputy Speaker (1966) and as the Parliamentary Assistant to the Minister of Industry and Tourism in October 1972. He also acted as Chief Party Whip.

He won his first election by the slim margin of 35 votes, but in 1963 he won by over 6,000. He won by a bigger margin again in 1967 and in his last election, in 1971, he won by over 10,000 votes.

In 1975, he retired from provincial politics.

== After politics ==
After he left politics, he was made chair of the board of trustees of the Ontario Science Centre, where he served two three-year terms until 1983. He is credited with raising the international profile of the Ontario Science Centre, and oversaw the exhibition China: 7,000 Years of Discovery, that broke all previous attendance records, attracting more than 1.5 million visitors in 1982.

A very spiritual man, Reilly organized the first Ontario Prayer Breakfast in 1970. It is now an annual event, which is held in Toronto.

== Personal life ==
Reilly was married twice. He was married to Hilda Beulah Huffman (1912-1978) until her death. They had three daughters together. After her death, he was married to Jean Reilly from 1979 until his death in 2008.

He was licensed as a private pilot and, on March 17, 1958, while flying a small plane in Florida, the plane experienced an engine failure and he was forced to land on the beach at Ft. Lauderdale. He passed his last driver's license test at age 95.

He died at Sunnybrook Hospital in 2008, at 95 years old. He was one month shy of his 96th birthday. At the time of his death, he had 10 grandchildren, 8 great-grandchildren, and one great-great-granddaughter. One of his great-grandsons is actor Stephen Kalyn.
