= Wallace William Walsh =

Canadian politician from Ontario

Member of the Ontario Provincial Parliament for Haldimand—Norfolk
- In office August 4, 1943 – February 9, 1944
- Preceded by: Eric William Blake Cross
- Succeeded by: Charles Martin

Personal details
- Died: February 9, 1944
- Party: Progressive Conservative

Wallace William Walsh (died February 9, 1944) was a Canadian politician who was Progressive Conservative MPP for Haldimand—Norfolk from 1943 to 1944.

== See also ==
- 21st Parliament of Ontario
