= Haldimand—Norfolk (provincial electoral district) =

Provincial electoral district in Ontario, Canada

Coordinates: 43°N 80°W

Norfolk, 1926–1934 Haldimand—Norfolk, 1934–1987 Norfolk, 1987–1999 Haldimand—Norfolk, 1999–Present
Ontario electoral district
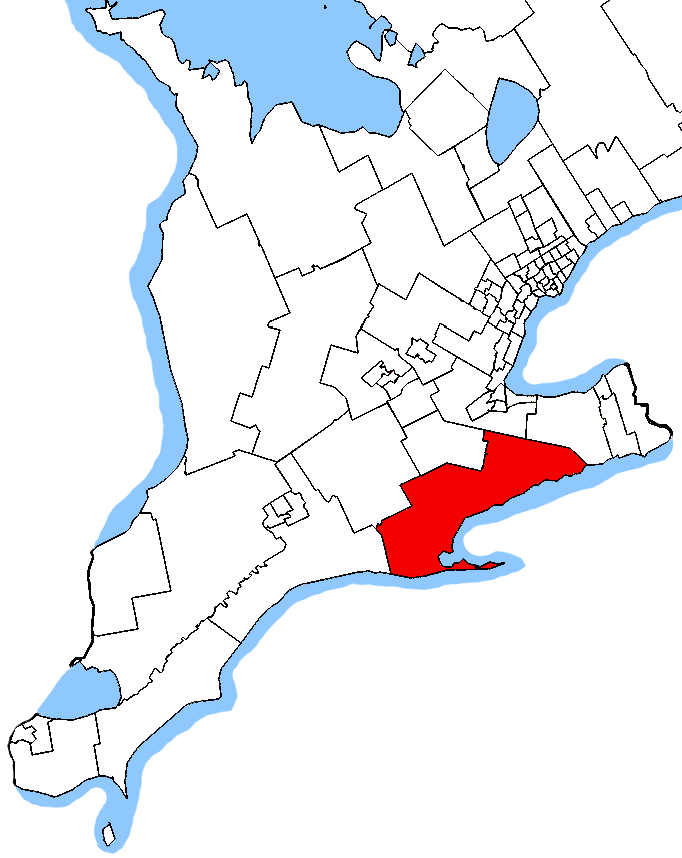
- Haldimand—Norfolk in relation to other southwestern Ontario electoral districts

Provincial electoral district
- Legislature: Legislative Assembly of Ontario
MPP
Bobbi Ann Brady
Independent
- District created: 1996
- First contested: 1999
- Last contested: 2025

Demographics
- Population (2016): 109,655
- Electors (2018): 86,342
- Area (km²): 4,337
- Pop. density (per km²): 25.3
- Census division: Haldimand-Norfolk
- Census subdivision(s): Haldimand, Norfolk

Haldimand—Norfolk is a provincial electoral district in southwestern Ontario, Canada. It was created for the 2007 provincial election. 88.0% of the riding came from Haldimand—Norfolk—Brant while 12.0% came from Erie—Lincoln.

It is currently held by independent MPP Bobbi Ann Brady. Prior to her election to the Legislative Assembly, Brady worked as executive assistant to her predecessor, Progressive Conservative MPP Toby Barrett. When Barrett announced his retirement, Brady planned to run for the nomination to replace him as the PC candidate, but after the party's central office directly appointed Haldimand County mayor Ken Hewitt as its new candidate without consulting the local electoral district association, Brady opted to run against Hewitt as an independent, with Barrett's endorsement and participation in her campaign. She retained her seat at the 2025 election with 63% of the vote.

The riding includes all of the counties of Haldimand and Norfolk.

The riding also existed from 1934 to 1987.

== Members of Provincial Parliament ==
Norfolk/Haldimand—Norfolk
Assembly	Years	Member	Party
Norfolk North and Norfolk South combined to form Norfolk
17th	1926–1929	John Strickler Martin	Conservative
18th	1929–1931	John Strickler Martin	Conservative
18th	1931–1934	Arthur Campbell Burt	Conservative
Haldimand and Norfolk combined to form Haldimand—Norfolk
19th	1934–1937	Richard Colter	Liberal
20th	1937–1943	Eric Cross	Liberal
21st	1943–1944	William Walsh	Progressive Conservative
21st	1944–1945	Charles Martin	Progressive Conservative
22nd	1945–1948	Charles Martin	Progressive Conservative
23rd	1948–1951	Charles Martin	Progressive Conservative
24th	1951–1955	James Allan	Progressive Conservative
25th	1955–1959	James Allan	Progressive Conservative
26th	1959–1963	James Allan	Progressive Conservative
27th	1963–1967	James Allan	Progressive Conservative
28th	1967–1971	James Allan	Progressive Conservative
29th	1971–1975	James Allan	Progressive Conservative
30th	1975–1977	Gord Miller	Liberal
31st	1977–1981	Gord Miller	Liberal
32nd	1981–1985	Gord Miller	Liberal
33rd	1985–1987	Gord Miller	Liberal
Riding renamed to Norfolk
34th	1987–1990	Gord Miller	Liberal
35th	1990–1995	Norm Jamison	New Democratic
36th	1995–1999	Toby Barrett	Progressive Conservative
Riding renamed to Haldimand—Norfolk—Brant
37th	1999–2003	Toby Barrett	Progressive Conservative
38th	2003–2007	Toby Barrett	Progressive Conservative
Riding renamed to Haldimand—Norfolk
39th	2007–2011	Toby Barrett	Progressive Conservative
40th	2011–2014	Toby Barrett	Progressive Conservative
41st	2014–2018	Toby Barrett	Progressive Conservative
42nd	2018–2022	Toby Barrett	Progressive Conservative
43rd	2022–2025	Bobbi Ann Brady	Independent
44th	2025–present	Bobbi Ann Brady	Independent

== Election results ==
Winning party in each polling division of Haldimand—Norfolk at the 2025 Ontario general election

2025 Ontario general election
Party	Candidate	Votes	%	±%
Independent	Bobbi Ann Brady	33,669	63.65	+28.60
Progressive Conservative	Amy Martin	12,949	24.48	–6.01
Liberal	Vandan Patel	2,918	5.52	–1.81
New Democratic	Erica Englert	2,147	4.06	–9.83
Green	Anna Massinen	821	1.55	–2.50
New Blue	Garry Tanchak	392	0.74	–2.46
Total valid votes		52,896	99.65	
Total rejected, unmarked and declined ballots		184	0.35	–0.21
Turnout		53,080	54.19	+5.31
Eligible voters		97,954		
Independent hold		Swing		+17.31
Source: Elections Ontario

Winning party in each polling division of Haldimand—Norfolk at the 2022 Ontario general election

2022 Ontario general election
Party	Candidate	Votes	%	±%	Expenditures
Independent	Bobbi Ann Brady	15,921	35.05	–	$40,046
Progressive Conservative	Ken Hewitt	13,851	30.49	–26.61	$18,432
New Democratic	Sarah Lowe	6,311	13.89	–13.01	$7,899
Liberal	Aziz Chouhdery	3,329	7.33	–1.87	$0
Ontario Party	Sheldon Simpson	2,353	5.18	–	$33,280
Green	Erik Coverdale	1,841	4.05	–0.09	$488
New Blue	Nate Hawkins	1,454	3.20	–	$7,320
Freedom	Thecla Ross	268	0.59	+0.27	$0
Independent	George McMorrow	99	0.22	–	$0
Total valid votes/expense limit		45,427	99.45	–	$131,173
Total rejected, unmarked and declined ballots		252	0.55	–0.47	
Turnout		45,679	48.88	–10.32	
Eligible voters		93,450			
Independent gain from Progressive Conservative		Swing		+30.83	
Source: Elections Ontario

2018 Ontario general election
Party	Candidate	Votes	%	±%
Progressive Conservative	Toby Barrett	28,889	57.10	+4.88
New Democratic	Danielle Du Sablon	13,609	26.90	+3.74
Liberal	Dan Matten	4,656	9.20	–10.51
Green	Anne Faulkner	2,095	4.14	–0.76
None of the Above	Dan Preston	817	1.61	–
Libertarian	Christopher Rosser	251	0.50	–
Freedom	Thecla Ross	160	0.32	–
Multicultural	Wasyl Ivan Luczkiw	64	0.13	–
Pauper	Carolyn Ritchie	52	0.10	–
Total valid votes		50,593	98.97	
Total rejected, unmarked and declined ballots		524	1.03	–2.21
Turnout		51,117	59.20	+5.23
Eligible voters		86,342		
Progressive Conservative hold		Swing		+0.57
Source: Elections Ontario

2014 Ontario general election
Party	Candidate	Votes	%	±%
Progressive Conservative	Toby Barrett	22,066	52.22	–8.58
New Democratic	Ian Nichols	9,786	23.16	+3.74
Liberal	Karen Robinson	8,331	19.72	+2.62
Green	Anne Faulkner	2,071	4.90	+2.81
Total valid votes		42,254	96.76	
Total rejected, unmarked and declined ballots		1,414	3.24	+2.88
Turnout		43,668	53.97	+0.67
Eligible voters		80,907		
Progressive Conservative hold		Swing		–6.16
Source: Elections Ontario

2011 Ontario general election
Party	Candidate	Votes	%	±%
Progressive Conservative	Toby Barrett	25,203	60.81	–0.11
New Democratic	Ian Nichols	8,048	19.42	+8.82
Liberal	Greg Crone	7,087	17.10	–5.13
Green	Justin Blake	868	2.09	–3.10
Family Coalition	John G. Gots	242	0.58	–0.48
Total valid votes		41,448	99.64	
Total rejected, unmarked and declined ballots		148	0.36	–0.40
Turnout		41,596	53.31	–2.94
Eligible voters		78,030		
Progressive Conservative hold		Swing		–4.47
Source: Elections Ontario

2007 Ontario general election
Party	Candidate	Votes	%	±%
Progressive Conservative	Toby Barrett	26,135	60.92	–
Liberal	Lorraine Bergstrand	9,536	22.23	–
New Democratic	Jan Watson	4,546	10.60	–
Green	Chad Squizzato	2,230	5.20	–
Family Coalition	Stephen Elgersma	457	1.07	–
Total valid votes		42,904	99.25	
Total rejected, unmarked and declined ballots		325	0.75	–
Turnout		43,229	56.25	–
Eligible voters		76,856		
Progressive Conservative hold		Swing		–
Source: Elections Ontario

=== Norfolk (1987–1999) ===
1995 Ontario general election: Norfolk
Party	Candidate	Votes	%	±%
Progressive Conservative	Toby Barrett	17,335	48.68	+20.01
Liberal	Rudy Stickl	9,413	26.43	–3.88
New Democratic	Norm Jamison	7,893	22.16	–18.86
Family Coalition	Andre De Decker	972	2.73	–
Total valid votes		35,613	98.94	
Total rejected, unmarked and declined ballots		380	1.06	+0.08
Turnout		35,993	64.14	–3.81
Eligible voters		56,116		
Progressive Conservative gain from New Democratic		Swing		+19.44
Source: Elections Ontario

1990 Ontario general election: Norfolk
Party	Candidate	Votes	%	±%
New Democratic	Norm Jamison	14,850	41.03	+14.45
Liberal	Gord Miller	10,971	30.31	–24.82
Progressive Conservative	Clarence Abbott	10,374	28.66	+10.38
Total valid votes		36,195	99.03	
Total rejected, unmarked and declined ballots		356	0.97	+0.41
Turnout		36,551	67.95	+5.04
Eligible voters		53,790		
New Democratic gain from Liberal		Swing		+19.64
Source: Elections Ontario

1987 Ontario general election: Norfolk
Party	Candidate	Votes	%	±%
Liberal	Gord Miller	17,313	55.14	–0.92
New Democratic	Norm Jamison	8,346	26.58	+14.31
Progressive Conservative	Ian A. Birnie	5,742	18.29	–13.48
Total valid votes		31,401	99.44	
Total rejected ballots		177	0.56	–
Turnout		31,578	62.91	–
Eligible voters		50,198		
Liberal notional hold		Swing		–7.62
Source: Elections Ontario

=== Haldimand—Norfolk (1934–1987) ===
1985 Ontario general election
Party	Candidate	Votes	%	±%
Liberal	Gord Miller	17,456	56.06	–0.43
Progressive Conservative	Barbara Martindale	9,863	31.67	+1.18
New Democratic	Wayne Pierce	3,821	12.27	–0.74
Total valid votes		31,140	99.65	
Total rejected ballots		110	0.35	+0.02
Turnout		31,250	66.44	+3.40
Eligible voters		47,037		
Liberal hold		Swing		–0.80
Source: Elections Ontario

1981 Ontario general election
Party	Candidate	Votes	%	±%
Liberal	Gord Miller	16,254	56.49	+7.12
Progressive Conservative	Clarence Abbott	8,775	30.50	–6.56
New Democratic	Lois Berry	3,744	13.01	–0.55
Total valid votes		28,773	99.66	
Total rejected ballots		97	0.34	+0.11
Turnout		28,870	63.03	–8.23
Eligible voters		45,802		
Liberal hold		Swing		+6.84
Source: Elections Ontario

1977 Ontario general election
Party	Candidate	Votes	%	±%
Liberal	Gord Miller	15,496	49.37	+4.01
Progressive Conservative	Gordon W. McNern	11,632	37.06	–1.95
New Democratic	Norm Walpole	4,257	13.56	–2.06
Total valid votes		31,385	99.77	
Total rejected ballots		71	0.23	–0.13
Turnout		31,456	71.26	–0.63
Eligible voters		44,142		
Liberal hold		Swing		+2.98
Source: Elections Ontario

1975 Ontario general election
Party	Candidate	Votes	%	±%
Liberal	Gord Miller	13,976	45.36	+19.67
Progressive Conservative	James Allan	12,021	39.02	–18.65
New Democratic	Norm Walpole	4,814	15.62	–1.01
Total valid votes		30,811	99.64	
Total rejected ballots		111	0.36	–0.61
Turnout		30,922	71.89	–2.59
Eligible voters		43,013		
Liberal gain from Progressive Conservative		Swing		+19.16
Source: Elections Ontario

1971 Ontario general election
Party	Candidate	Votes	%	±%
Progressive Conservative	James Allan	16,197	57.67	+4.39
Liberal	Alfred W. Judd	7,216	25.69	–8.24
New Democratic	Thomas C. Tobey	4,673	16.64	+4.85
Total valid votes		28,086	99.03	
Total rejected ballots		274	0.97	+0.17
Turnout		28,360	74.48	+4.73
Eligible voters		38,075		
Progressive Conservative hold		Swing		+6.32
Source: Elections Ontario

1967 Ontario general election
Party	Candidate	Votes	%	±%
Progressive Conservative	James Allan	11,768	53.28	–3.90
Liberal	George Baldock	7,496	33.94	–5.55
New Democratic	Harry Yaychuk	2,603	11.78	+9.23
Social Credit	William Triska	221	1.00	+0.22
Total valid votes		22,088	99.21	
Total rejected ballots		177	0.80	+0.03
Turnout		22,265	69.75	–0.64
Eligible voters		31,920		
Progressive Conservative hold		Swing		+0.83
Source: Elections Ontario

1963 Ontario general election
Party	Candidate	Votes	%	±%
Progressive Conservative	James Allan	14,307	57.17	–2.19
Liberal	John E. Cooper	9,882	39.49	–1.14
New Democratic	Myron Stachnyk	640	2.56	–
Social Credit	William Triska	195	0.78	–
Total valid votes		25,024	99.24	
Total rejected ballots		192	0.76	–0.16
Turnout		25,216	70.39	+6.15
Eligible voters		35,822		
Progressive Conservative hold		Swing		–0.52
Source: Elections Ontario

1959 Ontario general election
Party	Candidate	Votes	%	±%
Progressive Conservative	James Allan	13,007	59.37	+2.64
Liberal	Murray Boughner	8,903	40.63	+1.80
Total valid votes		21,910	99.08	
Total rejected ballots		204	0.92	–0.06
Turnout		22,114	64.25	–7.16
Eligible voters		34,420		
Progressive Conservative hold		Swing		+0.42
Source: Elections Ontario

1955 Ontario general election
Party	Candidate	Votes	%	±%
Progressive Conservative	James Allan	12,914	56.73	+5.15
Liberal	Thomas J. Jacob	8,840	38.83	–1.65
Co-operative Commonwealth	W. E. S. James	1,011	4.44	–3.50
Total valid votes		22,765	99.02	
Total rejected ballots		226	0.98	–0.03
Turnout		22,991	71.41	+2.07
Eligible voters		32,196		
Progressive Conservative hold		Swing		+3.40
Source: Elections Ontario

1951 Ontario general election
Party	Candidate	Votes	%	±%
Progressive Conservative	James Allan	11,298	51.58	+4.90
Liberal	Elmo L. Riddle	8,868	40.48	+2.27
Co-operative Commonwealth	Carroll E. Lindsay	1,739	7.94	–7.18
Total valid votes		21,905	98.99	
Total rejected ballots		224	1.01	+0.26
Turnout		22,129	69.34	+3.92
Eligible voters		31,912		
Progressive Conservative hold		Swing		+1.31
Source: Elections Ontario

1948 Ontario general election
Party	Candidate	Votes	%	±%
Progressive Conservative	Charles Martin	9,805	46.67	–6.96
Liberal	Elmo L. Riddle	8,027	38.21	+5.33
Co-operative Commonwealth	Carroll E. Lindsay	3,175	15.11	+1.63
Total valid votes		21,007	99.24	
Total rejected ballots		160	0.76	+0.13
Turnout		21,167	65.42	–5.64
Eligible voters		32,354		
Progressive Conservative hold		Swing		–6.15
Source: Elections Ontario

1945 Ontario general election
Party	Candidate	Votes	%	±%
Progressive Conservative	Charles Martin	11,943	53.64	–2.14
Liberal	Alborn F. Head	7,321	32.88	+12.31
Co-operative Commonwealth	Leo Lafortune	3,003	13.49	–10.17
Total valid votes		22,267	99.37	
Total rejected ballots		141	0.63	+0.63
Turnout		22,408	71.06	–
Eligible voters		31,534		
Progressive Conservative hold		Swing		–7.23
Source: Elections Ontario

Ontario provincial by-election, 1944
Party	Candidate	Votes	%	±%
Progressive Conservative	Charles Martin	10,621	55.78	+10.88
Co-operative Commonwealth	James Gilmore Gibson	4,504	23.65	+8.95
Liberal	George Mutrie	3,916	20.57	–19.82
Total valid votes		19,041	100.00	
Total rejected ballots		–		
Turnout		19,041	–	–
Eligible voters				
Progressive Conservative hold		Swing		+9.91
Source: Elections Ontario

1943 Ontario general election
Party	Candidate	Votes	%	±%
Progressive Conservative	Wallace William Walsh	7,868	44.90	+1.34
Liberal	Eric William Blake Cross	7,077	40.39	–16.05
Co-operative Commonwealth	Frederick Philip Grove	2,577	14.71	–
Total valid votes		17,522	99.16	
Total rejected ballots		148	0.84	+0.05
Turnout		17,670	61.27	–15.09
Eligible voters		28,840		
Progressive Conservative gain from Liberal		Swing		+8.69
Source: Elections Ontario

1937 Ontario general election
Party	Candidate	Votes	%	±%
Liberal	Eric William Blake Cross	12,638	56.44	+0.01
Conservative	Lea Strange Marshall	9,755	43.56	–0.01
Total valid votes		22,393	99.22	
Total rejected ballots		177	0.78	–0.12
Turnout		22,570	76.36	+2.04
Eligible voters		29,557		
Liberal hold		Swing		+0.01
Source: Elections Ontario

1934 Ontario general election
Party	Candidate	Votes	%	±%
Liberal	Richard Colter	12,164	56.43	–
Conservative	Richard Nixon Berry	9,393	43.57	–
Total valid votes		21,557	99.09	
Total rejected ballots		197	0.91	–
Turnout		21,754	74.32	–
Eligible voters		29,272		
Liberal gain from Conservative		Swing		–
Source: Elections Ontario

=== Norfolk (1926–1934) ===
Ontario provincial by-election, July 8, 1931: Norfolk Death of John Strickler Martin
Party	Candidate	Votes	%	±%
Conservative	Arthur Campbell Burt	5,513	48.93	–6.47
Liberal	Eric William Blake Cross	5,455	48.41	+3.80
Unknown	Alexander Stewart	300	2.66	–
Total valid votes		11,268	100.00	
Total rejected ballots		–		
Turnout		11,268	–	–
Eligible voters				
Conservative hold		Swing		–5.14
Source: Elections Ontario

1929 Ontario general election: Norfolk
Party	Candidate	Votes	%	±%
Conservative	John Strickler Martin	7,206	55.39	+0.75
Liberal	Wallace Harley Mason	5,803	44.61	–0.75
Total valid votes		13,009	99.28	
Total rejected ballots		94	0.72	+0.07
Turnout		13,103	78.42	–0.82
Eligible voters		16,709		
Conservative hold		Swing		+0.75
Source: Elections Ontario

1926 Ontario general election: Norfolk
Party	Candidate	Votes	%
Conservative	John Strickler Martin	7,421	54.64
Liberal	Wallace Harley Mason	6,161	45.36
Total valid votes		13,582	99.35
Total rejected ballots		89	0.65
Turnout		13,671	79.24
Eligible voters		17,252	
Conservative pickup new district.			
Source: Elections Ontario

== 2007 electoral reform referendum ==
2007 Ontario electoral reform referendum
Side	Votes	%
First Past the Post	28,566	68.6
Mixed member proportional	13,064	31.4
Total valid votes	41,630	100.0

== See also ==
- List of Ontario provincial electoral districts
- Canadian provincial electoral districts
