= William Hodgins Biggar =

Canadian politician

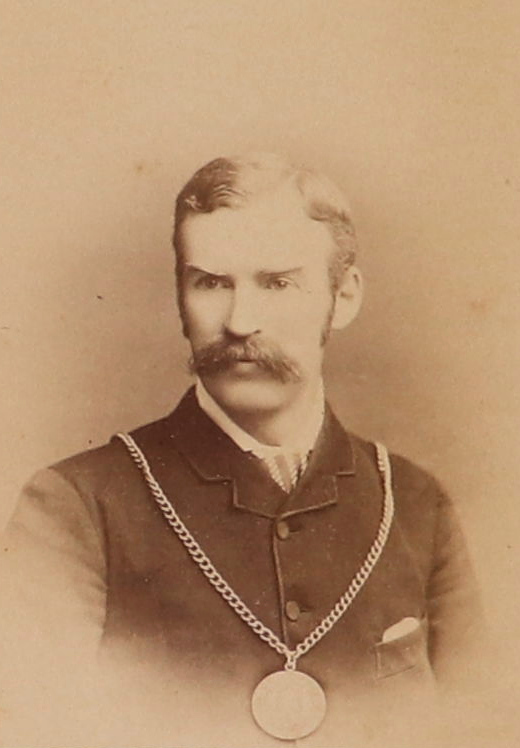

Ontario MPP for Hastings West
- In office 1890–1898
- Preceded by: George Wellington Ostrom
- Succeeded by: Marshall Bidwell Morrison
- Constituency: Hastings West

Personal details
- Born: September 19, 1852 Carrying Place, Canada West
- Died: July 7, 1922 (aged 69)
- Party: Conservative
- Spouse: Marie Louise Ballou (m. 1893)
- Occupation: Lawyer

William Hodgins Biggar (September 19, 1852 – July 7, 1922) was an Ontario business lawyer and political figure. He represented Hastings West in the Legislative Assembly of Ontario as a Liberal member from 1890 to 1898. He also served on the parliamentary committee overseeing the construction of the Legislative Assembly building for Ontario.

He was born in Carrying Place, Canada West, in 1852, the son of James Lyons Biggar; his mother's brothers were Thomas Hodgins and John George Hodgins. He was educated in Trenton and at Upper Canada College. In 1893, he married Marie Louise Ballou, whose father was a partner in Tiffany & Co. of New York. Biggar began work as a merchant, but later studied law, was called to the bar in 1880 and became a partner of John Bell, legal counsel for the Grand Trunk Railway. Biggar succeeded Bell as legal counsel when Bell retired, and later became vice president of the Grand Trunk Railway system. He also served as an officer in the Toronto volunteer militia, the Queen's Own Rifles, and was mayor of Belleville in 1887. Biggar also served as counsel for the Grand Trunk Pacific Railway.

The town of Biggar, Saskatchewan, was named after him.
