= Gilbert Wellington Ostrom =

Canadian politician

Member of the Legislative Assembly of Ontario for Hastings West
- In office 1886–1890

Personal details
- Born: June 1837 Belleville, Upper Canada
- Died: December 19, 1917 (aged 80) Trenton, Ontario, Canada
- Party: Conservative

Gilbert Wellington Ostrom (June 1837 – December 19, 1917) was an Ontario lawyer and political figure. He represented Hastings West in the Legislative Assembly of Ontario as a Conservative member from 1886 to 1890.

He was born in Belleville, Upper Canada in 1837, the son of Sylvester Ostrom, and educated at Albert College. He studied law with John Bell and Lewis Wallbridge, was called to the bar in 1869 and practiced in Belleville and later Trenton. Ostrom was a member of the Trenton town council and served as reeve in 1879 and mayor in 1886. He ran unsuccessfully for the same seat in the provincial assembly in 1890.
