= Charles Martin (Canadian politician) =

Canadian politician

Charles H. Martin

Ontario MPP
- In office March 20, 1944 – October 06, 1951
- Preceded by: Wallace William Walsh
- Succeeded by: James Allan
- Constituency: Haldimand—Norfolk

Personal details
- Born: September 11, 1881 Walpole Township, Haldimand County, Ontario, Canada
- Died: August 16, 1957 (aged 75) Simcoe, Ontario, Canada
- Party: Ontario Progressive Conservative Party
- Occupation: Merchant

Charles Hammond Martin (September 11, 1881 – August 16, 1957) was a Canadian politician. He served as a Progressive Conservative Party of Ontario Member of Provincial Parliament in the Ontario Legislative Assembly for the riding of Haldimand—Norfolk from 1944 to 1951.

He was born at Walpole Township, Haldimand County in 1881, the son of George and Clara H. (née Strickler) Martin. He married Florence B. Saville on September 11, 1912 and had two children. He was a merchant and member in the firm of Martin Brothers. Martin was also active in the local Rotary Club. He died at his home in Simcoe, Ontario in 1957.
