= Richard Colter =

Canadian lawyer and politician

Ontario MPP
- In office 1934–1937
- Preceded by: New riding
- Succeeded by: Eric Cross
- Constituency: Haldimand—Norfolk

Personal details
- Born: August 10, 1878; Cayuga, Ontario
- Died: June 3, 1950 (aged 71); Cayuga, Ontario
- Political party: Liberal
- Spouse: Aletha Birdsall (m. 1903)
- Children: 4
- Occupation: Lawyer

Richard Samuel Colter (August 10, 1878 – June 3, 1950) was a lawyer and politician in Ontario, Canada. He represented Haldimand—Norfolk in the Legislative Assembly of Ontario from 1934 to 1937 as a Liberal.

The son of Charles Wesley Colter and Annie Folinsbee, he was born in Cayuga and was educated there and at Osgoode Hall Law School. In 1903, he married Aletha Birdsall. Together they raised four children. He was chairman of the Ontario Municipal Board. He died in Cayuga in 1950, aged 71.
