= Roy McMurtry =

Canadian politician (1932–2024)

The Honourable Roy McMurtry OC OOnt KC
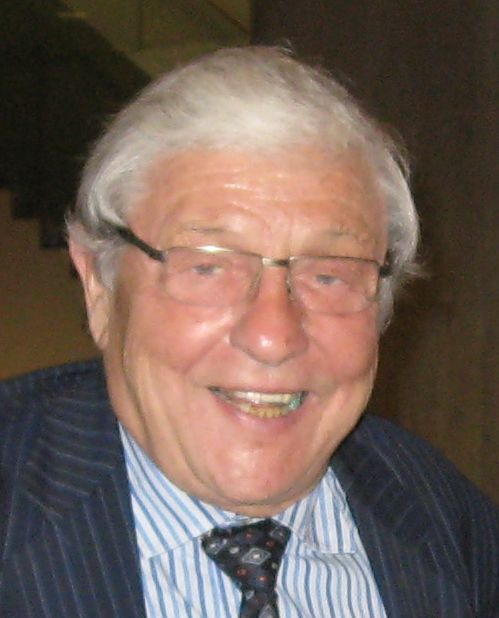

Chief Justice of Ontario
- In office 1996–2007
- Preceded by: Charles Dubin
- Succeeded by: Warren Winkler

Canadian High Commissioner to the United Kingdom
- In office 1985–1988
- Prime Minister: Brian Mulroney
- Preceded by: Donald Jamieson
- Succeeded by: Donald Stovel Macdonald

Attorney General of Ontario
- In office 1975–1985
- Premier: Bill Davis
- Preceded by: John Clement
- Succeeded by: Robert Welch

Ontario MPP
- In office 1975–1985
- Preceded by: Leonard Mackenzie Reilly
- Succeeded by: David McFadden
- Constituency: Eglinton

Personal details
- Born: Roland Roy McMurtry; May 31, 1932 Toronto, Ontario, Canada
- Died: March 18, 2024 (aged 91)
- Party: Progressive Conservative
- Spouse: Ria Jean Macrae
- Children: 6
- Education: Trinity College, Toronto (BA); Osgoode Hall Law School; (LLB)
- Occupation: Lawyer, jurist

Roland Roy McMurtry OC OOnt KC (May 31, 1932 – March 18, 2024) was a Canadian lawyer, judge and politician in Ontario. He was a Progressive Conservative member of the Legislative Assembly of Ontario from 1975 to 1985, serving in the cabinet of Bill Davis as Attorney General and as Solicitor General. After leaving politics, McMurtry was High Commissioner of Canada to the United Kingdom between 1985 and 1988. He became a judge in 1991 and was appointed Chief Justice of Ontario in 1996. McMurtry retired from the bench in 2007 and returned to the private practice of law.

== Early life ==
Roland Roy McMurtry was born in Toronto as the son of lawyer Roy McMurtry. He was educated at St. Andrew's College and graduated in 1950. He received a Bachelor of Arts degree from the University of Toronto (Trinity College) in 1954, and a Bachelor of Laws degree from Osgoode Hall Law School in 1958. While attending university, he was admitted to the Zeta Psi fraternity and became a close friend of future Premier of Ontario Bill Davis, his Canadian football teammate.

While studying, he was hired to teach football at Upper Canada College. He also taught adult literacy classes at Frontier College, working through the day on construction projects and teaching at night. He was a trial lawyer for seventeen years before entering politics. He also wrote a weekly column in the Toronto Sun during the early 1970s.

== Political career ==
In the 1960s, he worked with Dalton Camp and Norman Atkins to remove John Diefenbaker as leader of the Progressive Conservative Party of Canada.

McMurtry suffered a back injury during the 1971 Ontario Progressive Conservative leadership convention and was able to exempt himself from choosing between Davis and rival candidate Allan Lawrence, whose campaign was managed by Atkins. Davis defeated Lawrence by 44 votes on the final ballot. A few weeks later, McMurtry organized a meeting which brought together the Davis and Lawrence leadership teams. The resulting alliance, known as the Big Blue Machine, dominated the Progressive Conservative Party into the 1980s.

=== Entering the legislature ===
Allan Lawrence resigned his St. George constituency in late 1972 to move to federal politics, and McMurtry was recruited by Davis as the Progressive Conservative candidate for a March 1973 by-election. He was unexpectedly defeated by Liberal Party candidate Margaret Campbell, a well-known municipal politician. He was first elected to the Legislative Assembly of Ontario two years later, in the 1975 provincial election, defeating Liberal candidate Frank Judge in the Eglinton constituency.

=== Attorney General ===
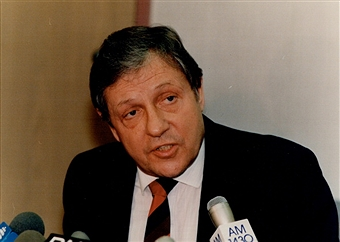
McMurtry as Attorney General

Davis won a minority government in the 1975 election, and McMurtry was immediately appointed to cabinet as Attorney General. He held this position until 1985, and he also served as Solicitor General from 1978 to 1982.

McMurtry introduced a large number of law reform bills and was largely responsible for family law reform in Ontario. In 1978, he took the first steps to make Ontario's legal system bilingual and to start the process of translating Ontario's statutes into French. He was a major advocate for human rights and improved race relations.

McMurtry was also the provincial minister responsible for emergency planning. During the 1979 Mississauga train derailment, he largely deferred to Mayor Hazel McCallion, who was the public face of the crisis handling.

==== Patriating the Constitution ====
McMurtry was a Red Tory, and he was one of Davis's closest advisers in government. As Attorney-General, he had been a primary negotiator for Ontario in the Trudeau-era constitutional negotiations. He appeared as counsel for Ontario in the Patriation Reference before the Supreme Court of Canada. In November 1981, he played a major role in brokering the deal that achieved patriation of the Canadian Constitution and the creation of the Charter of Rights and Freedoms. A late-night "kitchen accord" between McMurtry, Jean Chrétien and Roy Romanow on 6 November 1981 broke a deadlock in negotiations, and resulted in the governments of all provinces except Quebec agreeing to the proposed reforms to the Constitution, which came into law the following year.

==== Susan Nelles prosecution ====
One of McMurtry's lowest points was his role in the prosecution of nurse Susan Nelles, who was charged with the murder of a number of infants at the Hospital for Sick Children in Toronto. The charges were dropped following a preliminary hearing and Nelles was exonerated by the Grange Commission, a royal commission called upon to examine the deaths. McMurtry was criticized for his Ministry's role in her wrongful prosecution. In a 2007 interview, McMurtry, looking back at the incident, said "I can remember that I had been away with my family on a school break, when I came back and saw the headlines, I brought in my deputy attorney-general, and said: 'What the hell is going on here? You've had a nurse arrested at one of the world's most famous hospitals?' " McMurtry said that local prosecutors failed to consult the ministry before consenting to the charges and that examining the case McMurtry had doubts that Nelles had exclusive access to all of the children.

==== Bathhouse raids ====
McMurtry was also Attorney-General at the time of the 1981 Toronto bathhouse raids which were widely denounced as one of the most socially regressive acts in the province's history. At the time it was widely believed that the raids were approved by McMurtry. In a 2007 interview, however, McMurtry said that this was not the case. "The irony of the whole thing was that I had expressed my concern to the chief of police; that it really looked like we were dissolving into a police state. The whole thing looked terrible. Without a doubt, that was one of my most frustrating experiences," said McMurtry.

=== Leadership race ===
When Davis resigned as Progressive Conservative leader and premier in 1985, McMurtry sought the party's leadership at the party's January 1985 leadership convention. He started as the underdog in the campaign, but impressed many delegates through his performance in candidates' debates and polling data showing him as the preferred choice of Ontario voters. During the contest, McMurtry was sometimes criticized for remaining too long in one portfolio. While his opponents all had diverse ministerial experience, McMurtry's expertise was focused more narrowly on matters of the law. His supporters included Robert Elgie, Frank Drea, Reuben Baetz and Bob MacQuarrie.

McMurtry won a total of 300 votes on the first ballot, considerably more than had been expected. It was not sufficient, however, to place better than fourth in a field of four, after Frank Miller, Dennis Timbrell and Larry Grossman. He was eliminated from the contest and gave his support to Grossman, a fellow Red Tory.

McMurtry's support was enough to move Grossman into second place on the second ballot, ahead of the more centrist Timbrell. Timbrell's delegates were divided on the last ballot, which allowed the conservative Miller to win the convention. Miller gave McMurtry the option of remaining as Attorney General in the new government, but he declined and announced his retirement from politics.

=== Cabinet posts ===
Davis ministry, Province of Ontario (1971–1985)
Cabinet posts (2)
Predecessor	Office	Successor
George Kerr	Solicitor General; 1978–1982	George Taylor
John Clement	Attorney General; 1975–1985	Bob Welch

== Diplomatic career ==
On February 4, 1985, Canadian External Affairs Minister Joe Clark announced that McMurtry had been appointed to succeed Donald Jamieson as Canada's High Commissioner to the United Kingdom. He served in this capacity until 1988. Upon his return to Canada, he resumed his law practice and served from 1989 to 1990 as chairman and chief executive officer of the Canadian Football League.

== Judicial career ==
McMurtry was appointed Associate Chief Justice of the Superior Court (Trial Division) in Ontario in 1991, and he became Chief Justice of that court in 1994. He became Chief Justice of Ontario in 1996, heading the entire court system in the province and leading the Court of Appeal for Ontario. That court gained a degree of public attention in 2003 when it ruled in Halpern v. Canada (Attorney General) that provisions of the Canadian Charter of Rights and Freedoms guaranteeing equality under the law required the Province of Ontario to issue marriage licences to same-sex couples. For this, The Globe and Mail named McMurtry and his fellow judges the "Nation Builders of 2003."

In the weeks prior to his retirement in 2007, McMurtry was widely praised as being a unifying force and consensus-builder during his tenure as Chief Justice. "Under Chief Justice McMurtry's leadership, we pulled together and we worked hard, and the chief justice reached out to the bar and he sought their support, and he got it," said Court of Appeal (and future Supreme Court Judge Michael Moldaver in a speech. "Thanks to his courage, leadership and vision, we now have an appeal process that is capable of delivering quality justice in a timely and efficient manner."

"I don't want to paint him as the Next Coming, but he has been a great uniter," said Clifford Lax, a veteran Toronto civil litigator. "He is a really very nice person who is able to find common ground. In a quiet, unassuming way, he has won a lot of converts to what he has done."

During his term, McMurtry also acted as the Mayor of Toronto's race relations commissioner and helped create Pro Bono Ontario, which helps provide free legal services to the poor and encourages lawyers to provide pro bono services. In 2000, he initiated the Public Legal Education Task Force, leading to the establishment of the Ontario Justice Education Network. OJEN promotes understanding, education and dialogue to support a responsive and inclusive justice system.

McMurtry is credited with helping transform a backlogged and sometimes fractious court into a highly efficient, harmonious body.

== Post-bench legal career ==
McMurtry returned to the practice of law after retiring from the bench. He was a member of the firm Gowling Lafleur Henderson LLP until August 2014, when he moved to Hull & Hull LLP. McMurtry was a member of Pro Bono Law Ontario's Advisory Board.

As of 2019, McMurtry was president of the Osgoode Society for Canadian Legal History, which made several oral histories and co-published two of his books:

- Memoirs and Reflections (Toronto: The Osgoode Society and the University of Toronto Press, 2013)
- Essays in the History of Canadian Law: Volume X – A Tribute to Peter Oliver (Toronto: The Osgoode Society and University of Toronto Press, 2008), 471 pp. (editor with Jim Phillips and John T. Saywell)

== Personal life ==
McMurtry was married to Ria Jean Macrae, with whom he had six children and 12 grandchildren. His eldest son, Jim McMurtry, ran as a Liberal in British Columbia in the 2006 federal election, placing second to Conservative Russ Hiebert. In 2025 Jim published "The Scarlet Lesson".

McMurtry was a landscape painter, originally taught by A.J. Casson, and donated pieces to charity auctions.

A Red Tory, McMurtry expressed dislike towards the Stephen Harper government from 2006 to 2015, claiming it suffered from a lack of compassion, as well as for causing more division in Canadian politics. McMurtry supported Eric Hoskins in the 2013 Ontario Liberal Party leadership election and Peter Elgie, Green Party of Canada candidate for the York-Simcoe riding in the 2014 Ontario general election and son of Robert Elgie, a Red Tory Progressive Conservative who served as Minister of Labour from 1978 to 1982 and MPP for York East from 1977 to 1985.

McMurtry died on March 18, 2024, at the age of 91.

== Honours ==
In 2007, McMurtry was awarded the Order of Ontario. In 2009, he was made an Officer of the Order of Canada "for his distinguished career of public service, notably as chief justice of Ontario, and for his extensive volunteer involvement in many social and multicultural initiatives".

In 2013, McMurtry was given the G. Arthur Martin medal for outstanding contributions to criminal justice. He served as the 12th Chancellor of York University from 2008 to 2014.

The headquarters of the Attorney General of Ontario, the "McMurtry-Scott Building", is named in honour of McMurtry and Ian Scott (Attorney General from 1985 to 1990).

A juvenile detention centre located in Brampton called "Roy McMurtry Youth Centre" was named in honour of McMurtry.

Academic offices
Preceded by Peter Cory	Chancellor of York University; 2008–2014	Succeeded by Greg Sorbara
Legal offices
Preceded by Charles Dubin	Chief Justice of Ontario; 1996–2007	Succeeded by Warren Winkler
Diplomatic posts
Preceded by Don Jamieson	Canadian High Commissioner to the United Kingdom; 1985–1988	Succeeded by Donald Stovel Macdonald
