= Toby Barrett =

Canadian politician

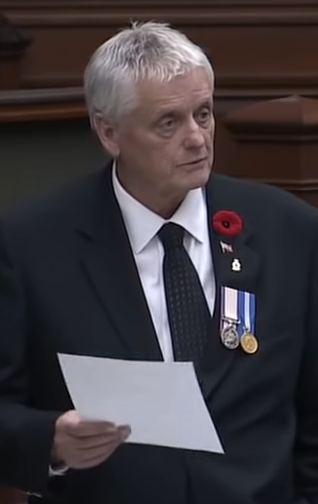

Parliamentary Assistant to the Minister of Agriculture, Food and Rural Affairs (Agriculture and Food) (Note: Parliamentary Assistant to the Minister of Agriculture and Food (2002–2003))
- In office June 26, 2019 – May 3, 2022
- Minister: Ernie Hardeman
- In office April 25, 2002 – September 2, 2003
- Minister: Helen Johns

Member of the Ontario Provincial Parliament for Haldimand—Norfolk (Note: Member of the Ontario Provincial Parliament for Norfolk (1995-1999))
- In office June 8, 1995 – May 3, 2022
- Preceded by: Norm Jamison
- Succeeded by: Bobbi Ann Brady

Personal details
- Born: November 3, 1945 (age 80) Port Dover, Ontario, Canada
- Party: Progressive Conservative
- Education: University of Guelph
- Occupation: Business administrator

Theobald Butler "Toby" Barrett is a former Progressive Conservative member of the Legislative Assembly of Ontario representing the district of Haldimand—Norfolk for the Progressive Conservative Party from 1995 until 2022.

== Background ==
Barrett was born in Port Dover, Ontario in 1945. His grandfather was Theobald Butler Barrett, Member of the Canadian Parliament for Norfolk from 1945 to 1949. Barrett received a Bachelor of Arts degree from the University of Guelph in 1968, and a Master of Science degree from the Ontario Agricultural College in 1974. He later worked as a teacher of High School agriculture, and has been a partner in Farmleigh Farms since 1980. He is a past president of the Norfolk Farm Safety Association, and a member of the Norfolk Federation of Agriculture.

== Politics ==
He was first elected to the Ontario legislature in the provincial election of 1995, defeating Liberal Rudy Stickl and incumbent New Democrat Norm Jamison in the riding of Norfolk. He was re-elected in 1999 in the redistributed riding of Haldimand—Norfolk—Brant. In 2003 he was re-elected again defeating Liberal candidate Rob Esselment by about 3,000 votes.

Barrett supported Jim Flaherty's unsuccessful bid to succeed Ernie Eves as leader of the Progressive Conservative Party in 2004.

In the 2007 Ontario general election, Barrett was easily re-elected, defeating Liberal candidate Lorraine Bergstrand by 26,100 votes to 9,500 votes in the newly redrawn riding of Haldimand-Norfolk. He was re-elected in the 2011 and 2014 elections.

Barrett served as the Parliamentary Assistant to the Minister of Natural Resources and Forestry under Premier Doug Ford.

Barrett did not run in the 2022 election. When he announced his retirement, his longtime executive assistant Bobbi Ann Brady planned to run for the nomination to replace him as the PC candidate, but after the party's central office directly appointed Haldimand County mayor Ken Hewitt as its new candidate without consulting the local electoral district association, Brady opted to run against Hewitt as an independent, with Barrett's endorsement and participation in her campaign. Brady ultimately won the election, and was the only independent to win a seat.
