= Leslie Blackwell =

Canadian politician (1897–1959)

Leslie Egerton Blackwell

Ontario MPP
- In office 1943–1951
- Preceded by: Harold James Kirby
- Succeeded by: William James Dunlop
- Constituency: Eglinton

Personal details
- Born: November 9, 1897 Lindsay, Ontario, Canada
- Died: October 20, 1959 (aged 61) Toronto, Ontario
- Party: Progressive Conservative
- Spouse: Jacqueline Sinclair
- Children: 2
- Occupation: Lawyer

Military service
- Rank: Private
- Unit: 204th Battalion, CEF
- Battles/wars: Battle of Cambrai

Leslie Egerton Blackwell (9 November 1897 – 20 October 1959) was a Canadian politician, soldier, lawyer, and land developer.

== Background ==
He was born in Lindsay, Ontario in 1897, but moved to Toronto when he was young. He grew up and was educated in the Parkdale area of Toronto. He joined the Canada Army as a private in 1916, during the First World War. His unit, the 204th Battalion of the Canadian Infantry, was commanded by future Ontario Attorney General, Lieutenant-Colonel William Price. He was severely injured in the war, losing a leg during the Battle of Cambrai in 1918. He came back to Canada and eventually graduated from the University of Toronto and Osgoode Hall law school.

== Politics ==
During the 1937 Ontario general election Blackwell was a candidate in Toronto's Eglinton electoral district; where he came in second on election night. He ran again in Eglinton, and was elected to the Legislative Assembly of Ontario in the 1943 election that brought George Drew's Progressive Conservative Party of Ontario to power with a minority government. Blackwell was immediately put into Drew's cabinet as Attorney General.

After Drew's departure from provincial politics, Blackwell was a candidate to replace him in the 1949 Conservative leadership election, placing second to Leslie Frost. He did not join Frost's cabinet and served his remaining time as a backbencher in the legislature, and did not run in the 1951 election.

=== Cabinet positions ===
Drew ministry, Province of Ontario (1943–1948)
Cabinet post (1)
Predecessor	Office	Successor
Eric Cross	Attorney General; 1943-1949	Dana Porter

== Later life ==
He went back to his private law practice and became involved in land development. He was working on the Thorncliffe Park housing development, in Toronto, when he was hospitalized in early October 1959. He finally succumbed to complications due to pneumonia on 20 October 1959.
