= Harold James Kirby =

Canadian politician

Ontario MPP
- In office 1934–1943
- Preceded by: Alvin McLean
- Succeeded by: Leslie Blackwell
- Constituency: Eglinton

Personal details
- Born: April 28, 1895 Maple, Ontario, Canada
- Died: October 20, 1956 (aged 61) Toronto, Ontario
- Party: Liberal

Harold James Kirby (April 28, 1895 – October 20, 1956) was a lawyer, real estate agent and political figure in Ontario. He represented Eglinton in the Legislative Assembly of Ontario from 1934 to 1943 as a Liberal member.

== Background ==
He was born in Maple, the son of James Henry Kirby, and educated in North Toronto and at Osgoode Hall. Kirby served overseas with the Canadian Expeditionary Force during World War I. He died following a heart attack in 1956.

== Politics ==
He was Minister of Health from 1937 to 1943 and Minister of Public Welfare from 1942 to 1943.

=== Cabinet positions ===
Hepburn ministry, Province of Ontario (1934–1942)
Cabinet posts (2)
Predecessor	Office	Successor
Farquhar Oliver	Minister of Public Welfare; 1942-1943	Farquhar Oliver
James Faulkner	Minister of Health; 1937-1943	Percy Vivian
