= Richard Duke Arnott =

Canadian lawyer and politician

Ontario MPP
- In office 1937–1945
- Preceded by: James Albert Faulkner
- Succeeded by: James Fredrerick Wilson
- Constituency: Hastings West

Personal details
- Born: June 20, 1904 Belleville, Ontario
- Died: March 15, 1971 (aged 66) Belleville, Ontario
- Party: Progressive Conservative
- Spouse: Marienne Lauder (m. 1934)
- Occupation: Lawyer

Richard Duke Arnott (June 20, 1904 – March 15, 1971) was a lawyer and politician in Ontario, Canada. He represented Hastings West in the Legislative Assembly of Ontario from 1943 to 1945 as a Conservative.

The son of Richard C. Arnott and Ida Mary Duke, he was born in Belleville and was educated there and at Osgoode Hall Law School. He was called to the Ontario bar in 1927. In 1934, Arnott married Marienne Lauder. He served on the municipal council for Belleville from 1935 to 1936 and was mayor in 1937. Arnott practised law in Belleville for 44 years. He also served as crown attorney and as solicitor for Hastings County.

Arnott died at the Belleville General Hospital at the age of 66.
