= 17th Parliament of Ontario =

1926–1929 term of the Legislative Assembly of Ontario, Canada

←	16th	18th	→
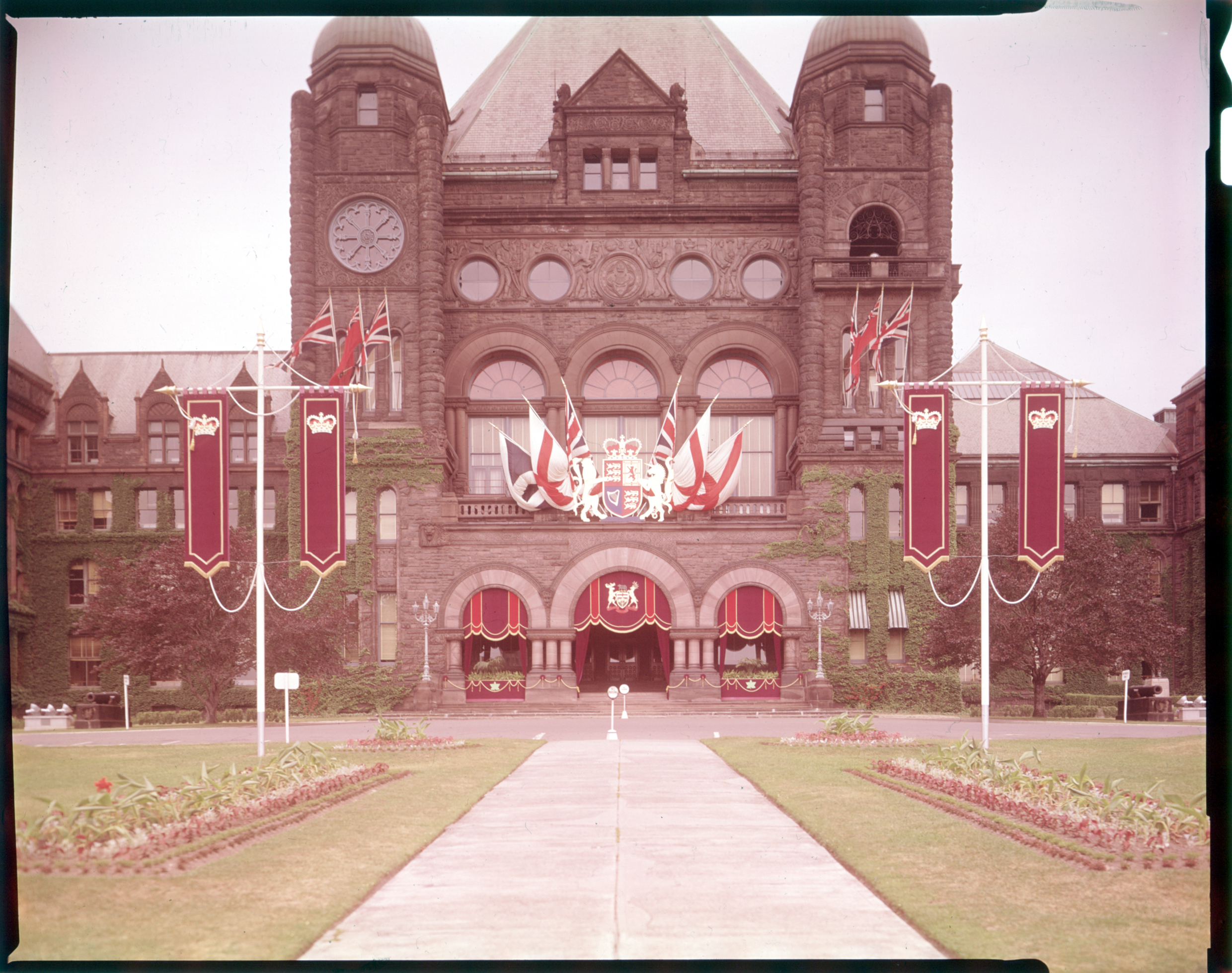
- Ontario Legislative Building ca. 1948

Overview
- Legislative body: Legislative Assembly
- Jurisdiction: Ontario, Canada
- Meeting place: Ontario Legislative Building
- Term: February 2, 1927 – September 7, 1929
- Election: 1926 Election
- Government: Ferguson ministry (Conservative)
- Members: 112
- Speaker: William David Black
- Premier: Howard Ferguson (Conservative)
- Leader of the Opposition: W.E.N. Sinclair (Liberal)
- Party control: 74 / 112(66%)

The 17th Parliament of Ontario (or the 17th Legislature of Ontario, as it was known then) was the provincial legislature of Ontario that consisted of representative elected in the 1926 Ontario general election held on December 1, 1926, and held office until the 1929 election. In 1926, Ontario voters re-elected the incumbent Conservative government headed by Premier Howard Ferguson in that election with a substantial majority mandate.

== Composition ==
=== Election outcome ===
When the dust settled in the days following the 1926 election, the incumbent Conservative government led by Premier Howard Ferguson had undisputedly secure a resounding mandate for his plan to repeal the Ontario Temperance Act and to implement a government controlled liquor retail system. Well over 70 members of his Conservative Party were elected to the new house with 112 seats.

While the overall big picture was abundantly clear, the finer details such as the exact seat counts or the precise make up of the opposition bench was less clear for a number of reasons unique to this election:

- Independent candidates (7 elected) - The principal campaign issue in the 1926 election was the government's plan to end prohibition in Ontario. The issue caused factures among both the governing Conservative Party and the Liberal Party. The incumbent Liberals who were "wet" contested the election as "Independent Liberal" candidates to signal their support for the government's plan and alignment with the opposition Liberals on other issues. Other candidates campaigned as independent-hyphen candidates to broaden their electoral appeal, most with tacit concurrence of their own party. Of the seven members who were elected independent labels, only one of them faced competition from a formally sanctioned candidate from their own party.
- Prohibitionist candidates (3 elected explicitly as such) - The Ontario Prohibition Union, the leading pro-temperance force in the 1924 Ontario prohibition referendum, operated as a militant political action committee in putting forward candidates pleadged to the dry cause in all electoral districts. While in some districts they put forward their own straight prohibitionist candidates, in most cases they broker agreements among pro-temperance candidates whether through a heavy hand behind closed door or through facilitating formal primary ballots. In a small number of districts, they even backed dry Conservative candidates, the most prominent candidate being former Attorney General William Nickle who resigned from the Ferguson ministry at the eve of the election call. Some of the candidates endorsed by the Union sought to highlight the endorsement by adding the prohibitionist, including three elected members.
- Progressive and United Farmer candidates - The members from the earlier United Farmer-Labour government joined forces and rebranded themselves as the Progressive Party. Two incumbent split off and resume their old United Farmer label upon the election of William Raney a non-farmer, as party leader. Many press report simply classified them all as Progressive Party candidate, even thought some of them explicitly repudiated the party. Many Progressive Party candidates campaigned by stressing presenting themselves as farmer candidates, adding to the confusion.

Party	Globe Toronto	Toronto Daily Star	Ottawa Citizen	Border Cities Star	Associated Press
Party	Dec 2	Dec 2	Dec 2	Dec 3	Dec 2
Conservative	75	75	74	74	75
Liberal	14	14	14	14	14
Progressive	10	13	13	13	12
Liberal Progressive	5	5	5	5	5
Independent Liberal	4	3	4	3	4
Labour	1	1	1	1	1
Prohibitionist	1				
Uncertain	2	1	1	2	2

- Liberal-Progressive and Progressive-Liberal candidates - in most electoral districts, the local Liberal Party and Progressive Party associations were able to reach agreements to field not both field candidates, thanks in large part to aggressive pressuring from the Ontario Prohibition Union. In some instances, the agreed upon candidate received the formal endorsement from the other party, and campaign as jointly nominated candidates. Press report immediately following the election identified five such candidates.

The main press outlets reported slightly different numbers on the day after the election. All outlets treated the Liberal-Progressives and the Independent Liberals as distinct categories, but did not report separate tallies for the United Farmers, or the members elected with additional Prohibitionist or independent labels.

=== Caucus formation ===
Two Conservatives, four Liberals, and one Progressive members were returned after having campaigned with the independent labels in addition to their party label. Two Liberals members were returned after having campaigned as Liberal-Prohibitionist. These members all joined their parties' rank in the legislature as expected without controversy. The four Liberals in particular campaigned with the independent labels due to their stance as "wet". They supported the government's implementation of liquor control but sat with the Liberals in the legislature and voted with their Liberal peers on issues other than temperance and liquor control.

Four returned members campaigned as Liberal-Progressive or Progressive Liberals: David Munroe Ross and Merton Elvin Scott, the pair returned for Oxford, and William Newman and Frederick George Sandy, the pair for Victoria. A fifth member, John Henry Mitchell of Simcoe Southwest, was erroneous identified as Liberal Progressive by press reports, and declared his Liberal partisan affiliation in his maiden speech. Ross and Sandy, along with Dufferin member Thomas Slack, were previously part of the United Farmer government. The three joined the vast majority of their former colleagues and sat as Progressives. Scott, who served as mayor of Ingersoll prior to be elected, was well known as a Liberal partisan and joined the Liberal caucus as expected. This leaves William Newman, who was elected as a fusion candidate (as he called himself as such) and wished to remain affiliated with both groups. The clerk of the legislature however advised him that he must opt to sit behind one of the two party leaders. Newman opted to sit with the Liberals with the intention of supporting both leaders where possible.

P
P

P

17th Parliament of Ontario, upon convening in February 1927

Conservative: 74
Labour: 1 Joined Conservative
Liberal: 21
(including campaigned as
Liberal-Progressive: 2
Independent-Liberal: 4)
Progressive: 13
(including campaigned as
Liberal-Progressive: 2)

United Farmer: 3

Progressive > Conservative (byelection loss after first session)

=== Changes ===
A month following the opening of the parliament, on March 9, 1927, Waterloo South member Karl Kenneth Homuth formally joined the Conservative caucus. (Note: Following his re-election, Homuth took leading role in debates in support of the Ferguson's government before formally joining the Tories in March 1927.) After the conclusion of the first session, Progressive leader William Raney resigned his seat upon his appointment to the Supreme Court of Ontario in September 1927, and was succeeded by John Lethbridge as Progressive Party leader. Conservative Horace Stanley Colliver, who held the seat prior to the 1926 election and lost to Raney by less than half of percentage point, recaptured the seat in the subsequent by-election and took his seat at the convening of the second session.

The election of Progressive Member Malcolm Alex McCallum was annulled by the Supreme Court of Ontario after it ruled McCallum and the President of South Bruce Prohibition Union committed the corrupted act of bribery by incentivizing the Progressive candidate to withdraw from the contest by reimbursing his campaign expense. The ruling was upheld upon appeal, leading to McCallum being unseated in November 1927. His seat remain vacant for the entire second session as the byelection to fill the seat was not held until June 1928.

Conservative Alexander Stuart died on the second last day of the second session, becoming the fifth representative for Renfrew North to died in office. Conservative Leeming Carr, a minister without portfolio, resigned in May 1928 to accept the appointment to be Sheriff for Wentworth County. He was the fourth and last member of Ferguson's cabinet to resign.

By-elections for the three vacant seats were held in June 1928, all won by Conservative candidates. Among those elected was Edward Arunah Dunlop, who previously held the Renfrew North seat from 1902 to 1908 and again from 1911 to 1919 and whose father was among the former Renfrew North members died in office. He and Premier Ferguson were among the ardent young Turks when Premier James Whitney led the Conservative to power for the first time in 34 years. He was immediately the third most senior member of the legislature upon his election as member for Renfrew North for the third time, and joined the Ferguson ministry as a minister without portfolio a day before the third session convened, and would be promoted by Ferguson to be Treasurer following the subsequent election. Dunlop did not escape the curse of the Renfrew North seat however. He was the sixth and last member for Renfrew North to died in office, and the second and to date last finance minister to died in office.

Three more members resigned after the conclusion of the third sessions.

17th Legislative Assembly of Ontario - Change in partisan composition
Party		1926 election	Caucus	Allegiance		Gain (loss)				dissolution (1929)
Party		1926 election	Caucus	declared	changed	Unseated	Died	Resigned	Byelection	dissolution (1929)
	Conservative	72	74		+1		(1)	(3)	+4	75
	Independent-Conservative	2	74		+1		(1)	(3)	+4	75
	Liberal	13	19	+2				(1)		20
	Independent Liberal	4	19	+2				(1)		20
P	Liberal-Prohibitionist	2	19	+2				(1)		20
	Progressive	9	10	+3		(1)		(1)		11
	Independent-Progressive	1	10	+3		(1)		(1)		11
	Liberal Progressive	4	4	(4)						
	United Farmer	3	3							3
	Labour	1	1		(1)					0
P	Farmer-Prohibitionist	1	1	(1)						
	Vacant	–	-					3		3
Total		112	112	-	-	(1)	(1)	(2)	4	112

== Legislative session ==
Consistent with the usual practice in the first half of the twenties century, the 17th Parliament sat for three months in the early month of each year, in the following three sessions.

Session	Convened	Adjourned
1st	February 2, 1927	April 5, 1927
2nd	February 9, 1928	April 3, 1928
3rd	January 30, 1929	March 28. 1929

== Members ==
=== Key Figures ===
Government		Opposition	
	George V (1910–36); King of the United Kingdom (Note: Prior to the Statute of Westminster 1931, Canada was strictly speaking a dominion of the British Empire, thus did not have its own Crown per se.)		
Henry Cockshutt (1921–27) William Ross (1927–31); Lieutenant Governor
	William David Black, Addington; Speaker		
Premier; Conservative Party Leader	Howard Ferguson; Grenville	W.E.N. Sinclair; Ontario South	Leader of the Opposition; Leader, Liberal Party (interim)
Acting Premier; Conservative Party de facto deputy leader	George Stewart Henry; York East (Note: George Henry was designated as acting Premier on every occasions that the Premier is unavailable.)	Alexander Mewhinney; Bruce North	Whip, Liberal Whip
Chief Government Whip; Conservative Whip	William Henry Ireland; Hastings West	William Edgar Raney; Prince Edward	Progressive Party Leader
		John Giles Lethbridge; Middlesex West	Progressive Party Leader
		John Wesley Widdifield; Ontario North	Progressive Whip
		Leslie Warner Oke; Lambton East	United Farmers Leader

=== Notable new intake ===
The class of 1926 included the following notable members.

- W.A. Baird, High Park - was the last mayor of Toronto Junction before it was annexed by Toronto in 1907
- Thomas Farquhar, Manitoulin - a Mayor of Sault Ste. Marie prior to his election, his political career spanned four decades including services in the House of Commons and then Senate until his death, his resignation from the Commons provided Nobel Laureate and future prime minister Lester Pearson his entry into Parliament
- William Martin, Brantford - a Methodist Church minister, later served as Minister of Welfare and Minister of Public Works in the Henry ministry, and as a Manitoba MLA.
- Farquhar Oliver, Grey South - the youngest member in this parliament at age 22, later served as Minister of Public Works and Welfare in the Hepburn and Nixon ministries, and was deputy premier to Nixon; led the Ontario Liberal Party over three stints (1945–50, 1954–58, 1963–64) during its lengthy period in opposition
- Paul Poisson, Essex North - a WWI veteran who was awarded the Military Cross, later served in the Henry ministry as a minister without portfolio
- Frederick Thomas Smye, Hamilton West - appointed to the Ferguson Ministry in March 1929, and served until his death a year and a half later

=== List of Members ===
⁂ Members who served in the Ferguson ministry (during this parliament) § Party leaders in this parliament

Riding	Member	Party	First elected / previously elected	No. of terms
Addington	William David Black	Conservative	1911	5th term
Algoma	John Morrow Robb	Conservative	1915, 1926	2nd term*
Beaches	Thomas Alexander Murphy	Conservative	1926	1st term
Bellwoods	William Henry Edwards	Conservative	1924	2nd term
Bracondale	Arthur Russell Nesbitt	Conservative	1923	2nd term
Brant County	Harry Corwin Nixon	Progressive	1919	3rd term
Brantford	William George Martin	Conservative	1926	1st term
Brockton	Frederick George McBrien	Conservative	1923	2nd term
Brockville	Hezekiah Allan Clark	Conservative	1923	2nd term
Bruce North	Alexander Patterson Mewhinney	Liberal	1919	3rd term
Bruce South	Malcolm Alex McCallum	Progressive	1923	2nd term
Bruce South	Foster Graham Moffatt (1928)	Conservative	1928	1st term
Carleton	Adam Holland Acres	Conservative	1923	2nd term
Cochrane North	Albert Victor Waters	Conservative	1926	1st term
Cochrane South	Alfred Franklin Kenning	Conservative	1926	1st term
Dovercourt	Samuel Thomas Wright	Conservative	1926	1st term
Dufferin	Thomas Kerr Slack	Progressive	1919, 1926	2nd term*
Dundas	George Smyth	Liberal-Prohibitionist	1926	1st term
Durham	William John Bragg	Liberal	1919	3rd term
Eglinton	Herbert Henry Ball	Conservative	1926	1st term
Elgin East	Edward Blake Miller	Liberal	1926	1st term
Elgin West	Findlay George MacDiarmid	Conservative	1898, 1899, 1923	9th term*
Essex North	Paul Poisson	Conservative	1926	1st term
Essex South	Charles George Fletcher	Liberal	1926	1st term
Fort William	Franklin Harford Spence	Conservative	1923	2nd term
Frontenac—Lennox	Edward Ming	Liberal	1926	1st term
Glengarry	Angus McGillis	Conservative	1926	1st term
Greenwood	George Joseph Smith	Conservative	1926	1st term
Grenville	George Howard Ferguson⁂ §	Conservative	1905	7th term
Grey North	David James Taylor	Progressive	1919	3rd term
Grey South	Farquhar Robert Oliver	United Farmers (Note: Oliver, Farquhar, and Oke sat as their own UFO faction. Other United Farmer MLAs belonged to the Progressive caucus.)	1926	1st term
Haldimand	Robert Francis Miller	Liberal	1926	1st term
Halton	George Hillmer	Conservative	1923	2nd term
Hamilton Centre	Thomas William Jutten	Conservative	1926	1st term
Hamilton East	Leeming Carr	Conservative	1923	2nd term
Hamilton East	William Morrison (1928)	Conservative	1928	1st term
Hamilton West	Frederick Thomas Smye⁂	Conservative	1926	1st term
Hastings East	James Ferguson Hill	Conservative	1923	2nd term
Hastings North	John Robert Cooke⁂	Conservative	1911	5th term
Hastings West	William Henry Ireland	Conservative	1919	3rd term
High Park	William Alexander Baird	Conservative	1926	1st term
Huron North	Charles Alexander Robertson	Liberal	1926	1st term
Huron South	William George Medd	United Farmers (Note: Sat with the Progressive caucus)	1926	1st term
Kenora	Joseph Pattulo Earngey	Conservative	1926	1st term
Kent East	Christopher Gardiner	Progressive	1926	1st term
Kent West	Archibald Clement Calder	Conservative	1926	1st term
Kingston	Thomas Ashmore Kidd	Conservative	1926	1st term
Lambton East	Leslie Warner Oke§	United Farmers	1919	3rd term
Lambton West	Wilfred Smith Haney	Conservative	1923	2nd term
Lanark North	Thomas Alfred Thompson	Conservative	1923	2nd term
Lanark South	Egerton Reuben Stedman	Conservative	1923	2nd term
Leeds	Frederick James Skinner	Conservative	1926	1st term
Lincoln	Robert Henry Kemp	Progressive	1923	2nd term
London North	James Percy Moore	Conservative	1926	1st term
London South	John Cameron Wilson	Conservative	1926	1st term
Manitoulin	Thomas Farquhar	United Farmers	1926	1st term
Middlesex North	Alexander Daniel McLean	Independent-Progressive	1926	1st term
Middlesex West	John Giles Lethbridge§	Progressive	1919	3rd term
Muskoka	George Walter Ecclestone	Conservative	1919	3rd term
Niagara Falls	William Gore Willson	Conservative	1923	2nd term
Nipissing	Henri Morel	Conservative	1908, 1923	5th term*
Norfolk	John Strickler Martin	Conservative	1923	2nd term
Northumberland	William George Robertson	Liberal	1926	1st term
Ontario North	John Wesley Widdifield	United Farmers	1919	3rd term
Ontario South	William Edmund Newton Sinclair§	Liberal	1911, 1919	4th term*
Ottawa East	Joseph Albert Pinard	Independent-Liberal	1914	4th term
Ottawa North	Albert Edwin Honeywell	Conservative	1926	1st term
Ottawa South	Thomas Miles Birkett	Conservative	1926	1st term
Oxford North	David Munroe Ross	Liberal-Progressive	1921	3rd term
Oxford South	Merton Elvin Scott	Liberal-Progressive	1926	1st term
Parkdale	William Herbert Price⁂	Conservative	1914	4th term
Parry Sound	George Vernon Harcourt	Conservative	1923	2nd term
Peel	Thomas Laird Kennedy	Conservative	1919	3rd term
Perth North	Joseph Dunsmore Monteith⁂	Conservative	1923	2nd term
Perth South	Albert Alexander Colquhoun	Liberal	1926	1st term
Peterborough City	William Herbert Bradburn	Conservative	1923	2nd term
Peterborough County	William Alfred Anderson	Liberal	1902, 1926	3rd term*
Port Arthur	Donald McDonald Hogarth	Independent-Conservative	1911, 1926	4th term*
Prescott	Edmond Proulx	Independent-Liberal	1923	2nd term
Prince Edward	William Edgar Raney§ (Note: appointed judge)	United Farmers	1920	3rd term
Prince Edward	Horace Stanley Colliver (1928)	Conservative	1923, 1928	2nd term*
Rainy River	James Arthur Mathieu	Conservative	1911, 1926	4th term*
Renfrew North	Alexander Stuart	Conservative	1923	2nd term
Renfrew North	Edward Arunah Dunlop⁂ (1928)	Conservative	1903, 1911, 1928	5th term*
Renfrew South	Thomas Moore Costello	Conservative	1926	1st term
Riverdale	George Oakley	Conservative	1923	2nd term
Russell	Aurélien Bélanger	Independent-Liberal	1923	2nd term
Sault Ste. Marie	James Lyons⁂	Conservative	1923	2nd term
Simcoe Centre	Charles Ernest Wright	Conservative	1923	2nd term
Simcoe East	William Finlayson⁂	Conservative	1923	2nd term
Simcoe Southwest	John Henry Mitchell	Liberal-Progressive	1926	1st term
St. Andrew	William Robertson Flett	Conservative	1926	1st term
St. Catharines	Edwin Cyrus Graves	Independent-Conservative	1923	2nd term
St. David	Joseph Elijah Thompson	Conservative	1919	3rd term
St. George	Henry Scholfield	Conservative	1911, (Note: Wellington South) 1926	2nd term*
St. Patrick	John Allister Currie	Conservative	1922	3rd term
Stormont	Duncan Alexander McNaughton	Conservative	1926	1st term
Sturgeon Falls	Théodore Legault	Independent-Liberal	1926	1st term
Sudbury	Charles McCrea⁂	Conservative	1911	5th term
Timiskaming	Angus John Kennedy	Conservative	1923	2nd term
Victoria North	William Newman	Liberal	1926	1st term
Victoria South	Frederick George Sandy	Liberal-Progressive	1919, 1926	2nd term*
Waterloo North	William George Weichel	Conservative	1923	2nd term
Waterloo South	Karl Kenneth Homuth	Labour	1919	3rd term
Waterloo South	Karl Kenneth Homuth	Conservative	1919	3rd term
Welland	Marshall Vaughan	Conservative	1923	2nd term
Wellington Northeast	George Alexander McQuibban	Liberal	1926	1st term
Wellington South	Lincoln Goldie⁂	Conservative	1923	2nd term
Wentworth North	Alex Laurence Shaver	Conservative	1926	1st term
Wentworth South	Thomas Joseph Mahony	Conservative	1923	2nd term
Windsor East	Frank Worthington Wilson	Conservative	1923	2nd term
Windsor West	John Frederick Reid	Conservative	1926	1st term
Woodbine	George Sylvester Shields	Conservative	1926	1st term
York East	George Stewart Henry⁂	Conservative	1913	5th term
York North	Peter William Pearson	Liberal	1926	1st term
York South	Leopold Macaulay	Conservative	1926	1st term
York West	Forbes Godfrey⁂	Conservative	1907	7th term

=== Changes in membership ===
Changes in seats held (1926–1929)
Electoral District	Before			Change	
Electoral District	Date	Reason	Member	New Member	Date
Waterloo South	March 9, 1927	Change of Allegiance	Karl Kenneth Homuth		March 9, 1927
Prince Edward	September 16, 1927	Resigned (Note: to accept judicial appointment)	William Edgar Raney	Horace Stanley Colliver	November 1, 1927
Bruce South	November 14, 1927	Unseated (Note: Election victory was annulled following a court ruling that McCallum and the President of South Bruce Prohibition Union have committed the corrupted act of bribery by incentivizing the Progressive candidate to withdraw from the contest by reimbursing his campaign expense. Ruling was upheld in appeal.)	Malcolm Alex McCallum	Foster Graham Moffatt	June 27, 1928
Renfrew North	April 2, 1928	Died in office	Alexander Stuart	Edward Arunah Dunlop	June 27, 1928
Hamilton East	May 15, 1928	Resigned (Note: to accepte appointment as Sheriff for Wentworth County)	Leeming Carr ⁂	William Morrison	June 27, 1928
Lanark North	June 1929	Resgined (Note: To contest the 1929 Lanark federal byelection)	Thomas Alfred Thompson	vacant at dissolution	
Prescott	September 10, 1929	Resigned	Edmond Proulx	vacant at dissolution	
St. David	September 1929	Resigned (Note: Appointed Registrar of the Surrogate Court)	Joseph Elijah Thompson	vacant at dissolution	
