= 18th Parliament of Ontario =

The 18th Legislative Assembly of Ontario was in session from October 30, 1929, until May 16, 1934, just prior to the 1934 general election. The majority party was the Ontario Conservative Party led by George Howard Ferguson.

George Stewart Henry replaced Ferguson as party leader and Premier in December 1930 after Ferguson was named Canadian High Commissioner in London.

Thomas Ashmore Kidd served as speaker for the assembly.

== Members of the Assembly ==
Italicized names indicate members returned by acclamation.

Riding	Member	Party	First elected / previously elected	No. of terms
Addington	William David Black	Conservative	1911	6th term
Algoma	John Morrow Robb	Conservative	1915, 1926	3rd term*
Beaches	Thomas Alexander Murphy	Conservative	1926	2nd term
Bellwoods	Thomas Hamilton Bell	Conservative	1929	1st term
Bracondale	Arthur Russell Nesbitt	Conservative	1923	3rd term
Brant County	Harry Corwin Nixon	Progressive	1919	4th term
Brantford	William George Martin	Conservative	1926	2nd term
Brockton	Frederick George McBrien	Conservative	1923	3rd term
Brockville	Hezekiah Allan Clark	Conservative	1923	3rd term
Bruce North	Frederick Wellington Elliott	Liberal	1929	1st term
Bruce South	William John MacKay	Liberal	1929	1st term
Carleton	Adam Holland Acres	Conservative	1923	3rd term
Cochrane North	Albert Victor Waters	Conservative	1926	2nd term
Cochrane South	Alfred Franklin Kenning	Conservative	1926	2nd term
Dovercourt	Samuel Thomas Wright	Conservative	1926	2nd term
Dufferin	Thomas Kerr Slack	Progressive	1919, 1926	3rd term*
Dundas	George Holmes Challies	Conservative	1929	1st term
Durham	William John Bragg	Liberal	1919	4th term
Eglinton	Alvin Coulter McLean	Conservative	1929	1st term
Elgin East	Herbert James Davis	Conservative	1929	1st term
Elgin West	Charles Edmund Raven	Conservative	1929	1st term
Essex North	Paul Poisson	Conservative	1926	2nd term
Essex South	Austin Burton Smith	Conservative	1929	1st term
Fort William	Franklin Harford Spence	Conservative	1923	3rd term
Frontenac-Lennox	Charles Wesley Hambly	Conservative	1923, 1929	2nd term*
Glengarry	James Alexander Sangster	Liberal	1923, 1929	2nd term*
Greenwood	George Joseph Smith	Conservative	1926	2nd term
Grenville	George Howard Ferguson (Note: accepted appointment)	Conservative	1905	8th term
Grenville	James Alfred Sanderson (1931)	Conservative	1931	1st term
Grey North	David James Taylor	Progressive	1919	4th term
Grey South	Farquhar Robert Oliver	United Farmers	1926	2nd term
Haldimand	Richard Nixon Berry	Conservative	1923, 1929	2nd term*
Halton	Thomas Aston Blakelock	Liberal	1929	1st term
Hamilton Centre	Thomas William Jutten	Conservative	1926	2nd term
Hamilton East	William Morrison	Conservative	1928	2nd term
Hamilton West	Frederick Thomas Smye	Conservative	1926	2nd term
Hamilton West	D'Arcy Argue Counsell Martin (1931)	Conservative	1931	1st term
Hastings East	James Ferguson Hill	Conservative	1923	3rd term
Hastings North	John Robert Cooke	Conservative	1911	6th term
Hastings West	William Henry Ireland	Conservative	1919	4th term
High Park	William Alexander Baird	Conservative	1926	2nd term
Huron North	Charles Alexander Robertson	Liberal	1926	2nd term
Huron South	William George Medd	Progressive	1926	2nd term
Kenora	Earl Hutchinson	Labour	1929	1st term
Kent East	Philip James Henry	Conservative	1929	1st term
Kent East	Douglas Munro Campbell (1934)	Liberal	1934	1st term
Kent West	Archibald Clement Calder	Conservative	1926	2nd term
Kingston	Thomas Ashmore Kidd	Conservative	1926	2nd term
Lambton East	Thomas Howard Fraleigh	Conservative	1929	1st term
Lambton West	Andrew Robinson McMillen	Conservative	1929	1st term
Lanark North	John Alexander Craig	Conservative	1929	1st term
Lanark South	James Alexander Anderson (Note: died in 1930)	Conservative	1929	1st term
Lanark South	Egerton Reuben Stedman (1931)	Conservative	1931	1st term
Leeds	Frederick James Skinner	Conservative	1926	2nd term
Lincoln	Sidney James Wilson	Conservative	1929	1st term
London North	James Percy Moore	Conservative	1926	2nd term
London South	John Cameron Wilson	Conservative	1926	2nd term
Manitoulin	Alvin Edwin Graham	Conservative	1929	1st term
Middlesex North	Fred Van Wyck Laughton	Conservative	1929	1st term
Middlesex West	Lloyd William Morgan Freele	Conservative	1929	1st term
Muskoka	George Walter Ecclestone	Conservative	1919	4th term
Niagara Falls	William Gore Willson	Conservative	1923	3rd term
Nipissing	Henri Morel	Conservative	1908, 1923	6th term*
Nipissing	Charles Robert Harrison (1930)	Conservative	1930	1st term
Norfolk	John Strickler Martin (Note: died in 1931)	Conservative	1923	3rd term
Norfolk	Arthur Campbell Burt (1931)	Conservative	1931	1st term
Northumberland	Frederick John McArthur	Conservative	1929	1st term
Ontario North	James Blanchard	Conservative	1929	1st term
Ontario South	William Edmund Newton Sinclair	Liberal	1911, 1919	5th term*
Ottawa East	Louis Côté	Conservative	1929	1st term
Ottawa North	Albert Edwin Honeywell	Conservative	1926	2nd term
Ottawa South	Arthur Ellis	Conservative	1929	1st term
Oxford North	David Munroe Ross	Liberal-Progressive	1921	4th term
Oxford South	Robert Andrew Baxter	Liberal	1929	1st term
Parkdale	William Herbert Price	Conservative	1914	5th term
Parry Sound	George Vernon Harcourt	Conservative	1923	3rd term
Peel	Thomas Laird Kennedy	Conservative	1919	4th term
Perth North	Joseph Dunsmore Monteith	Conservative	1923	3rd term
Perth South	David Bonis	Conservative	1929	1st term
Perth South	Charles Edward Richardson (1930)	Conservative	1930	1st term
Peterborough City	James Fordyce Strickland	Conservative	1929	1st term
Peterborough County	Thomas Percival Lancaster	Conservative	1929	1st term
Port Arthur	Donald McDonald Hogarth	Conservative	1911, 1926	5th term*
Prescott	Joseph St. Denis	Independent-Conservative	1929	1st term
Prince Edward	Horace Stanley Colliver	Conservative	1923, 1928	2nd term*
Rainy River	William Herbert Elliott	Independent-Conservative	1929	1st term
Renfrew North	Edward Arunah Dunlop	Conservative	1903, 1911, 1928	6th term*
Renfrew South	Thomas Patrick Murray	Liberal	1929	1st term
Riverdale	George Oakley	Conservative	1923	3rd term
Russell	Charles Avila Séguin	Conservative	1929	1st term
Sault Ste. Marie	James Lyons	Conservative	1923	3rd term
Simcoe Centre	Leonard Jennett Simpson	Liberal	1929	1st term
Simcoe East	William Finlayson	Conservative	1923	3rd term
Simcoe Southwest	James Edgar Jamieson	Conservative	1923, 1929	2nd term*
St. Andrew	Ephraim Frederick Singer	Conservative	1929	1st term
St. Catharines	Edwin Cyrus Graves	Conservative	1923	3rd term
St. David	Wilfred Heighington	Conservative	1929	1st term
St. George	Henry Scholfield	Conservative	1911, (Note: Wellington South) 1926	3rd term*
St. Patrick	Edward Joseph Murphy	Conservative	1929	1st term
Stormont	Duncan Alexander McNaughton	Conservative	1926	2nd term
Sturgeon Falls	Albert Zenophile Aubin	Conservative	1929	1st term
Sudbury	Charles McCrea	Conservative	1911	6th term
Timiskaming	Angus John Kennedy	Conservative	1923	3rd term
Victoria North	William Newman	Liberal	1926	2nd term
Victoria South	Wellesley Wilson Staples	Conservative	1929	1st term
Waterloo North	Sydney Charles Tweed	Liberal	1929	1st term
Waterloo South	Karl Kenneth Homuth (Note: resigned to run for federal seat)	Conservative	1919	4th term
Waterloo South	Norman Otto Hipel (1930)	Liberal	1930	1st term
Welland	Marshall Vaughan	Conservative	1923	3rd term
Wellington Northeast	George Alexander McQuibban	Liberal	1926	2nd term
Wellington South	Lincoln Goldie	Conservative	1923	3rd term
Wellington South	Duncan Paul Munro (1931)	Liberal	1931	1st term
Wentworth North	Alex Laurence Shaver	Conservative	1926	2nd term
Wentworth South	Thomas Joseph Mahony	Conservative	1923	3rd term
Windsor East	Frank Worthington Wilson	Conservative	1923	3rd term
Windsor West	John Frederick Reid	Conservative	1926	2nd term
Woodbine	George Sylvester Shields	Conservative	1926	2nd term
York East	George Stewart Henry	Conservative	1913	6th term
York North	Clifford Case	Conservative	1929	1st term
York South	Leopold Macaulay	Conservative	1926	2nd term
York West	Forbes Godfrey (Note: died in 1932)	Conservative	1907	8th term
York West	Henry Isaac Price (1932)	Conservative	1932	1st term

== Timeline ==
18th Legislative Assembly of Ontario - Movement in seats held (1929-1934)
Party	1929	Gain/(loss) due to				1934
Party	1929	Death in office	Resignation as MPP	Byelection gain	Byelection hold	1934
Conservative	90	(9)	(3)		7	85
Liberal	13			3		16
Progressive	4					4
Liberal–Progressive	1					1
United Farmers	1					1
Labour	1					1
Independent-Conservative	2					2
Vacant	–	2				2
Total	112	(7)	(3)	3	7	112

Changes in seats held (1929–1934)
Seat	Before				Change		
Seat	Date	Member	Party	Reason	Date	Member	Party
Nipissing	June 30, 1930	Henri Morel	█ Conservative	Chose to stand for Nipissing in the 1930 federal election	October 29, 1930	Charles Robert Harrison	█ Conservative
Lanark South	August 3, 1930	James Alexander Anderson	█ Conservative	Died in office	October 29, 1930	Egerton Reuben Stedman	█ Conservative
Waterloo South	July 12, 1930	Karl Kenneth Homuth	█ Conservative	Chose to stand for Waterloo North in the 1930 federal election	October 29, 1930	Norman Otto Hipel	█ Liberal
Perth South	July 19, 1930	David Bonis	█ Conservative	Died in office	October 29, 1930	Charles Edward Richardson	█ Conservative
Hamilton West	November 15, 1930	Frederick Thomas Smye	█ Conservative	Died in office	February 11, 1931	D'Arcy Argue Counsell Martin	█ Conservative
Grenville	December 15, 1930	George Howard Ferguson	█ Conservative	Appointed Canadian High Commissioner in London	February 11, 1931	James Alfred Sanderson	█ Conservative
Norfolk	May 13, 1931	John Strickler Martin	█ Conservative	Died in office	July 8, 1931	Arthur Campbell Burt	█ Conservative
Wellington South	September 19, 1931	Lincoln Goldie	█ Conservative	Died in office	November 18, 1931	Duncan Paul Munro	█ Liberal
York West	January 6, 1932	Forbes Godfrey	█ Conservative	Died in office	May 28, 1932	Henry Isaac Price	█ Conservative
Kent East	August 13, 1933	Philip James Henry	█ Conservative	Died in office	January 3, 1934	Douglas Munro Campbell	█ Liberal
Renfrew North	January 1, 1934	Edward Arunah Dunlop	█ Conservative	Died in office			█ Vacant
Perth North	January 8, 1934	Joseph Dunsmore Monteith	█ Conservative	Died in office			█ Vacant
