= Ferguson ministry =

Cabinet of Ontario, 1923–1930

Ferguson-Henry ministry
- ministry of Ontario

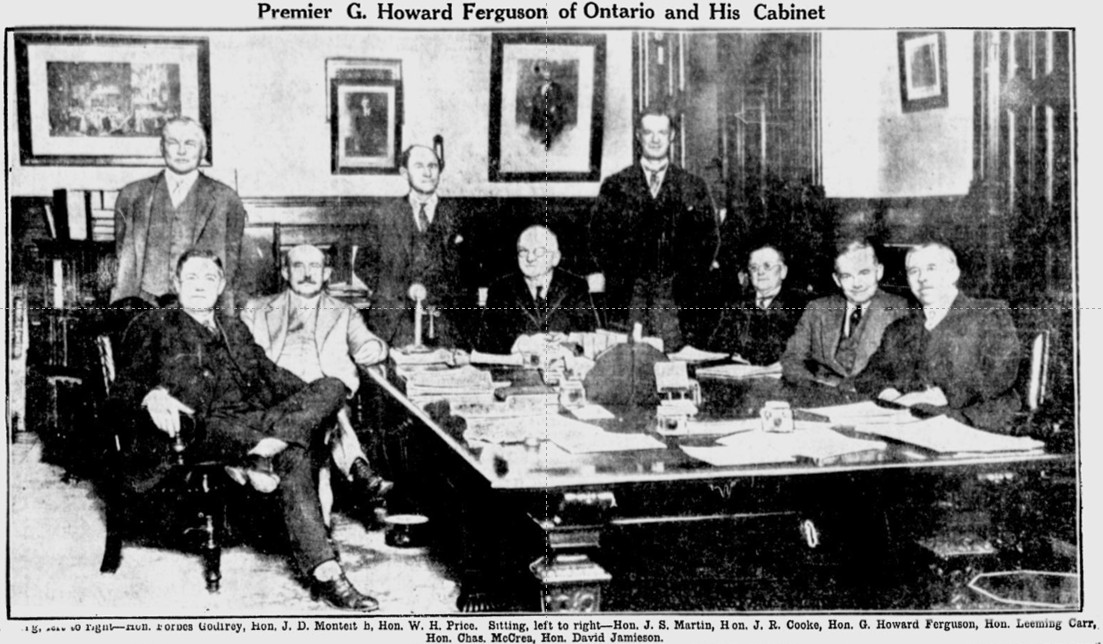
- Ferguson Ministry (at 1926 election)
- Date formed: July 16, 1923
- Date dissolved: July 10, 1934

People and organizations
- Monarch: George V
- Lieutenant Governor: Henry Cockshutt (1921-27); William Donald Ross (1927-31); William Mulock (1931–32); Herbert Alexander Bruce (1932–37)
- Prime Minister: Howard Ferguson (1923–30); George Henry (1930–34)
- No. of ministers: 14 (max), 26 (total)
- Member party: Conservative Party

History
- Elections: 1923, 1926, 1929
- Legislature term: 16th, 17th, 18th; parliaments
- Predecessor: Drury ministry
- Successor: Hepburn ministry

The Ferguson ministry, formally the Ferguson-Henry ministry, was the cabinet (formally the Executive Council of Ontario) that directed the provincial government of Ontario, Canada from July 16, 1923, to July 10, 1934.

The ministry was composed, and led for its first seven and a half years, by Howard Ferguson, the 9th Premier of Ontario (styled as Prime Minister of Ontario at that time) and Conservative Party leader since 1920. After leading his party to three consecutive majority victory, Ferguson retired from electoral politics toward the end of 1930 to become Canada's High Commissioner in London. He handed the leadership of his government and of his party to George Stewart Henry, his long time de facto deputy, on December 15, 1930 without a leadership convention. Henry presided over the ministry for another three and a half years for a total of eleven years.

For the entire tenure of the ministry, the Conservative Party held majority of the seats in the Legislative Assembly of Ontario. Accordingly, all members of the ministry were members of the Conservative Party.

The ministry was formed following the 1923 Ontario general election. The Conservative Party was previously in office from 1905 until it was ousted in the 1919 election by the upstart United Farmers of Ontario. Ferguson and Henry were both ministers in the ousted Hearst ministry. Ferguson, the campaign manager for the Conservative Party in 1919, was chosen to rebuild the party after the catastrophic defeat and led his party to back to power after just one term in opposition, securing a majority government.

The Ferguson ministry replaced the Drury ministry of the United Farmers, and governed through the 16th, 17th, and the 18th Parliament of Ontario. It renewed it governing mandate twice, respective in the 1926 election and 1929 election, retaining its majority status in both instances. While the United Farmers rebranded its parliamentary wing as the Progressive Party and contested those elections, they were mostly a spent force, winning less than a tenth of the vote both times. The Conservative under Ferguson won not only the majority of the seats in those two elections but also a majority share of the popular votes both times. The Conservative Party led by Ferguson in 1929 was the last time any party having won a majority share of the popular vote in Ontario by themselves. (Note: The Ontario Liberal Party won majority of the votes in 1934 and 1937 if candidates who ran under the Liberal–Progressive and Liberal–Labour banner were included.) The 90 seats it won in 1929 remained the largest seat count secured by any political party in Ontario history.

Ferguson resigned as premier in December 1930, upon being appointed Canada's High Commissioner in London by the newly elected Conservative government led by R. B. Bennett. George Stewart Henry, Ferguson's long time designated deputy, and the only other remaining member of the ministry with cabinet experience from prior ministry, succeeded Ferguson as Prime Minister. The successor Henry ministry was largely a continuation of the incumbent industry. All eleven members of the Ferguson ministry at its dissolution aside from Ferguson continued to serve in the new ministry, with many holding the same portfolio. With the exception of Dunlop and Monteith who died within ten days of each other, The other nine members all served until the end of the Henry ministry.

== Composition ==
The Ferguson ministry was formed on July 16, 1923 with thirteen members. While a new Department of Health was created during the ministry's tenure, the cabinet at no point grew larger than twelve members after its first departure in May 1924. Of the thirteen original members, three including Ferguson has previous cabinet experience.

- Adam Beck, as chair of Ontario Hydro was given a seat in cabinet as a minister without portfolio and served for the entire duration of the Whiney and Hearst ministries
- Ferguson was appointed to cabinet soon after William Hearst assumed the premiership and took over the portfolio previously held by the Premier.
- Henry entered cabinet in 1918 at the same time as Henry John Cody, Ferguson's university roommate and close personal confidant for whom he orchestrated a direct entry into cabinet as education minister without holding a seat or ever served in government prior.

Six other members have served as backbench members (then referred to as private members) of the previous Whitney-Hearst Conservative government.

Despite sweeping all ten seats in Toronto in 1923 and all fifteen in 1926 and 1929, Treasurer William Herbert Price (later Attorney General) was the only cabinet member representing a Toronto district during Ferguson's premiership after Thomas Crawford's departure within the first year of the ministry, though the members for the two surrounding York Township districts, George Henry and Forbes Godfrey, were both in cabinet. Upon Henry's assumption of the premiership in 1930, Henry Scholfield, representing the downtown district of St. George, was brought into cabinet.

Four member of the ministry, Henry, John Robert Cooke, Charles McCrea and William Herbert Price, served for the entire duration of the ministry, though only McCrea as mines minister held on to the same portfolio for the entire time. Two members of the ministry, Thomas Laird Kennedy and George Holmes Challies, would served again in later Conservative ministry.

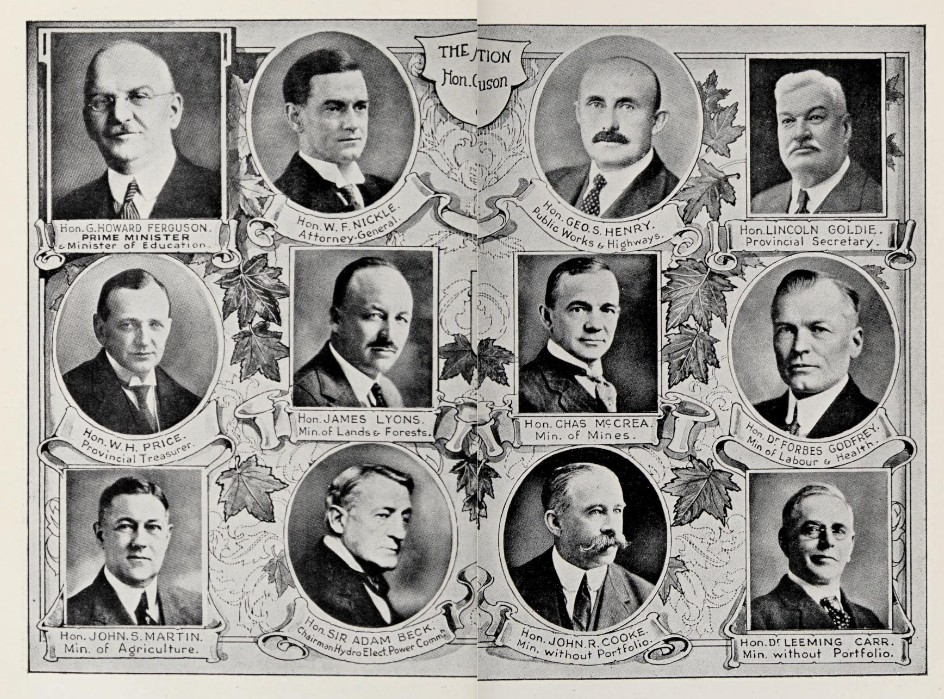
Ferguson cabinet 1924-25

=== Early departures ===
During the 16th parliament, the ministry experienced only minor changes, and three fairly innocuous departures. Thomas Crawford, who served as speaker of the legislative assembly in the early Whitney era and was already 76 when the Ferguson ministry was formed, resigned in May 1924 to accept the appointment as registrar of deeds for the City of Toronto. Sir Adam Beck, the long serving hydro chairman died in late summer of 1925.

On March 1, 1926 Ferguson announced the ministry's first significant resignation by reading in the legislature the resignation letter from land and forest minister James Lyons addressed to him and his reply. Lyon operated a successful fuel and supply company that had been doing business with the government and many operators in the north long before he joined the government. As concerns for the conflict of interests grew and became untenable, he opted to resign in order to protect his business interest. Being very familiar with the department himself, the premier took on the portfolio on as its interim minister.

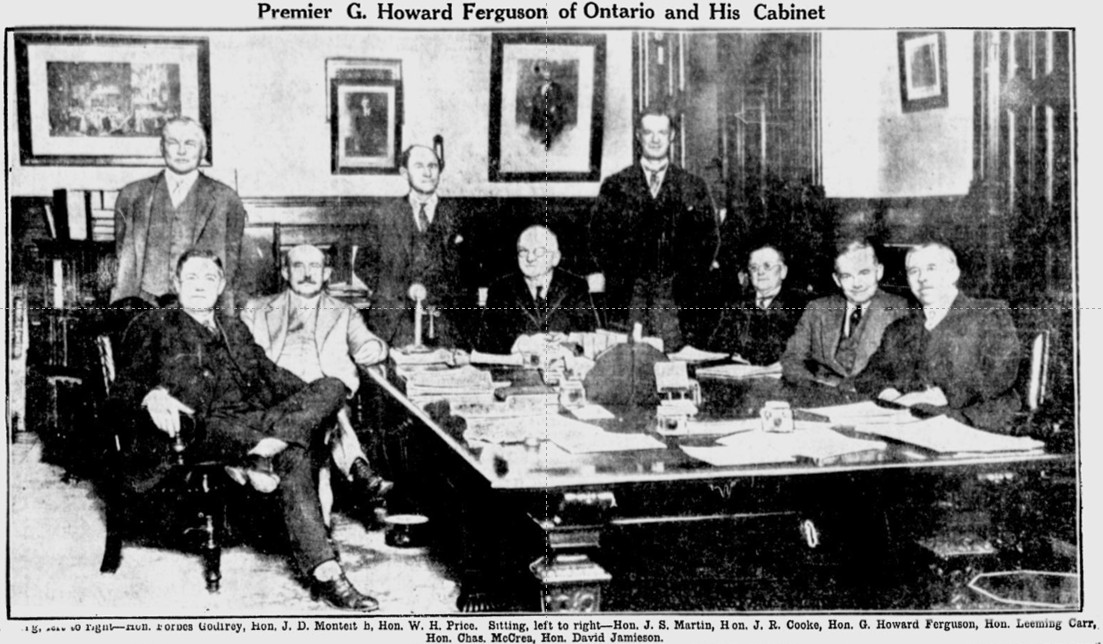
Ferguson cabinet after October 1926 shuffle

=== Split over prohibition ===
On the eve of the 1926 election, Attorney General William Nickle resigned over the government's policy on temperance and ran for re-election as a Prohibition Union's candidate, becoming the highest profile candidate nominated solely by the union. That triggered a major shuffle of the ministry which introduced three new members into cabinet. Among them were Joseph Montieth, who represented a midwestern riding, a region where the opposition is the strongest. One of the three new ministers, David Jamison of Grey South, was defeated by a 22-year old Farquhar Oliver, a future Liberal minister and party leader, and thus resigned shortly after.

=== 1930 Shuffle, Ban of Toronto Daily Star ===
The cabinet line up remained remarkably stable between the 1926 election and the 1929 election, with minister without portfolio Leeming Carr being the only departure when he was appointed sheriff for Wentworth County. All portfolio ministers remained in their post during that period.

Despite Ferguson's prominent presence and his boasting of the impending defeat of three Liberal cabinet members during the 1930 dominion election campaign, Ontario failed to deliver significant gains for the national Conservative Party when it won a majority mandate. Ontario delivered only six of the forty-six seats gained by the Conservative Party across Canada, and its portion of the popular vote actually declined slightly. There was little surprised that the Ferguson ministry lost no members in the subsequent formation of the Bennett ministry in Ottawa.

In the fall of 1930, Ferguson executed the most sweeping shuffle to his cabinet, which saw the departures of three senior ministers and the entry of four new members into the ministry. The reorganization plan was leaked in advance. The early leaks correctly identified the three ministers to be ousted — agriculture minister John Strickler Martin, health minister Forbes Godfrey, and Provincial Secretary Lincoln Goldie — and the four new entrants — Leopold Macaulay, Thomas Kennedy (a future premier), John Morrow Robb and William Martin. The Star and the Globe also incorrectly forecasted the demotion or ousting of Attorney General William Herbert Price. They however correctly forecasted the assignments of Kennedy as agriculture minister, Robb as health minister and Martin as public welfare minister, and the promotion of Dunlop to the powerful treasury portfolio. The level of details and the accuracy strongly suggest the leaks to be deliberate and from a source with actual knowledge of the plan.

While agriculture minister John Strickler Martin had long been in ill-health and was reported to have requested to be relived of cabinet duty, other ministers identified for ousters or demotions reacted swiftly. Treasurer Monteith, rumoured to be demoted to a much stripped down provincial secretariat (expected to distribute key functions such as hospital, prison and vehicle management to other departments and gaining fisheries from the mines department) had proxies citing his accomplishments in negotiating good borrowing rate for loans and made it known to the press that he has no interest to serve in a reduced role. His protest was however muted, likely restrained by the prospect of putting the imminent promotion of his first cousin Robb in jeopardy. In an unprecedented move that broke government communication protocol, Lincoln Goldie convened a general meeting of the Wellington South Conservative Association two days prior to announce this pending retirement and orchestrated resolutions by the association and various other petition calling on Ferguson to reconsider.

The most sensational coverage was over the acrimonious departure of health minister Dr. Forbes Godfrey. The Star breathlessly reported Godfrey's initial refusal to submit his resignation, Ferguson's ultimatum to the minister, the speculation of the need of a formal dismissal from the Crown (on the day of the shuffle), and that the crisis was only averted at the last minute. It followed with repeated coverage of angry commentary by Godfrey in the weeks that follow. It also reported that Toronto MPP Henry Scholfield was summoned to attend the cabinet meeting, but departed half way through. (He was not elevated into cabinet until three months later by Premier Henry.) In an extraordinary move of retaliation, Ferguson office announced that access to all ministers will be denied to reporters of the Toronto Daily Star until the outlet retract its reporting of the events.

Not all prediction became reality. Ferguson acknowledged that he canceled his plan to relinquish the education portfolio to Leopold Macaulay, who instead succeeded Goldie as Provincial Secretary. While Monteith was indeed shuffled, he took on two significant portfolios.

The three ousted ministers all died within sixteen months of the shuffle.

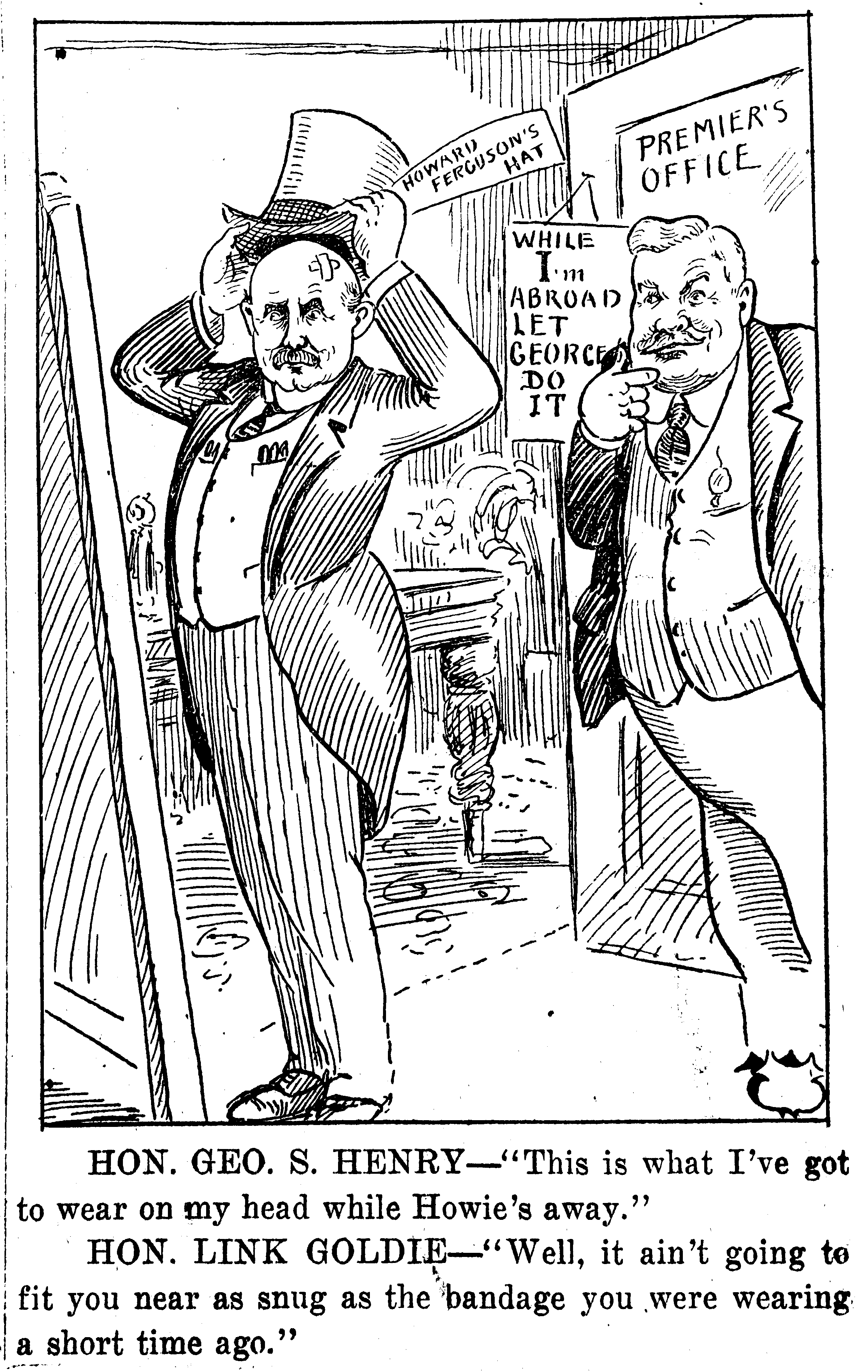
Political cartoon published in the Guelph Mercury in 1924, depicting Henry standing in for Ferguson during his absence, with Provincial secretary and Guelph local MPP Lincoln Goldie commenting.

=== Transition to Henry ===
The ministry further lost a member before Ferguson resigned three months after the acrimonious shuffle. Frederick Thomas Smye, a minister without portfolio, died unexpectedly in November 1930.

Ferguson resigned on December 15, 1930 to become Canada's High Commissioner in London. Despite having the precedent of formally electing Ferguson as party leader in 1930 (a contest in which Henry was a contestant), Henry assumed the premiership and the party leadership without a contest. He kept all cabinet members in place, but brought in two new members as minister portfolio. Henry took on Ferguson's education portfolio while holding on to his highways portfolio for the first seven months. In July 1931, Premier Henry transferred the highways portfolio to Leopold Macaulay, who in turn transfer the role of Provincial Secretary to new cabinet member George Holmes Challies.

Henry was opposed to government intervention in the economy. Aside from building roads, his government did little to alleviate public suffering during the Great Depression, such as unemployment in the cities, or the collapse of prices for farm products in the country. The ministry under Henry formalize the creation of the Department of Public Welfare, and like the federal government of R.B. Bennett established work camps for jobless men. They were established not so much to provide social welfare but rather as social control: to evacuate the potentially radical element from the cities. The work camps also provided a source of labour for the construction of Henry's highway system.

The ministry's line-up under Henry otherwise remained largely the same as under Ferguson through the next few years until untimely deaths again befall upon it on New Year's Day of 1934. The unexpected death of Treasurer Edward Arunah Dunlop was followed a week later by the death of his predecessor Joseph Monteith, who was labour and public works minister at the time.

== Resignation ==
Henry led the Conservative Party into the 1934 general election campaign carrying the baggage of a decade-old government and the weight of the Great Depression. The 17% drop of its share of the popular votes translated to a 73-seat loss, reducing its caucus from the record high of 90 seats to only 17 seats in the reduced 19th legislature. (Note: The Conservative Party's share of the legislature seats was reduced from 80% (90 out of 112) to 19% (17 out of 90)) For every six seats it held, more than five were lost. No other Ontario ministry suffered a more severe loss until 2018 when the Wynne ministry was defeated.

The Ferguson-Henry ministry resigned on July 10, 1934, and was replaced by the Liberal Hepburn ministry.

When the Conservative Party was return to power in 1943, only two members, Thomas Laird Kennedy and George Holmes Challies would return to serve in the subsequent Drew and Frost Conservative ministries. They would however both serve for a decade more, with Kennedy serving as Premier for six months .

== List of Ministers ==
=== In order of seniority ===
Served under Ferguson only Served under Henry only

| First entered ministry | Minister | Electoral district | (Note: Indicate that year's Ontario general election unless otherwise noted)First elected | (Note: No date indicate the minister served until the resignation of the ministry in July 1934)Exited ministry | Note |
|---|---|---|---|---|---|
| December 22, 1914 (Note: Whitney ministry) | Howard Ferguson | Grenville | 1905 | December 15, 1930 | |
| February 8, 1905 | Adam Beck | London | 1902 | August 15, 1925 | Died in office |
| May 23, 1918 | George Stewart Henry | York East | 1913 (Note: By-election) | | |
| July 16, 1923 | Thomas Crawford | Toronto Northwest A | 1894 | May 15, 1924 | Resigned to accept a public appointment |
| July 16, 1923 | Forbes Godfrey | York West | 1907 | September 16, 1930 | |
| July 16, 1923 | William Folger Nickle | Kingston | 1908 | October 18, 1926 | Resigned over stance on prohibition |
| July 16, 1923 | John Robert Cooke | Hastings North | 1911 | | |
| July 16, 1923 | Charles McCrea | Sudbury | 1911 | | |
| July 16, 1923 | William Herbert Price | Parkdale | 1914 | | |
| July 16, 1923 | Lincoln Goldie | Wellington South | 1923 | September 16, 1930 (Note: Tendered resignation no later than September 13, and announced to his local Conservative association) | |
| July 16, 1923 | John Strickler Martin | Norfolk South | 1923 | September 16, 1930 | |
| July 16, 1923 | James W. Lyons | Sault Ste. Marie | 1923 | March 2, 1926 | Resigned due to conflict of business interests |
| July 16, 1923 | Leeming Carr | Hamilton East | 1923 | May 15, 1928 | Resigned to accept a public appointment |
| October 18, 1926 | Joseph Monteith | Perth North | 1923 | January 8, 1934 | Died in office |
| October 18, 1926 | William Finlayson | Simcoe East | 1923 | | |
| October 18, 1926 | David Jamieson | Grey South | 1898 | December 1926 | Defeated in the 1926 election |
| January 29, 1929 | Edward Arunah Dunlop | Renfrew North | 1903 | January 1, 1934 | Died in office |
| March 21, 1929 | Frederick Thomas Smye | Hamilton West | 1926 | November 15, 1930 | Died in office |
| September 16, 1930 | Leopold Macaulay | York South | 1926 | | |
| September 16, 1930 | Thomas Laird Kennedy | Peel | 1919 | | |
| September 16, 1930 | John Morrow Robb | Algoma | 1915 | | |
| September 16, 1930 | William Martin | Brantford | 1926 | | |
| December 23, 1930 | Paul Poisson | Essex North | 1926 | | |
| December 23, 1930 | Henry Scholfield | St. George | 1926 | | |
| July 31, 1931 | George Holmes Challies | Dundas | 1929 | | |
| May 22, 1934 | James Percy Moore | London North | 1926 | | |

=== By portfolios ===
Held portfolio through both transitions

| Portfolio | Minister | Tenure | |
| Portfolio | Minister | Start | End |
|---|---|---|---|
| Prime Minister of Ontario (Note: In the first half of the twentieth century, the term premier was broadly used in reference to first ministers or the Canadian government, the various provincial governments, and even the British and other European governments. Between 1905 and 1970, the formal title associated with the first minister of the Ontario government were Prime Minister and President of the Council.); President of the Council | George Howard Ferguson | July 16, 1923 | December 15, 1930 |
| Prime Minister of Ontario; President of the Council | George Stewart Henry | December 15, 1930 | July 10, 1934 |
| Attorney General | William Folger Nickle | July 16, 1923 | October 18, 1926 |
| Attorney General | William Herbert Price | October 18, 1926 | July 10, 1934 |
| Provincial Secretary & Registrar | Lincoln Goldie | July 16, 1923 | September 16, 1930 |
| Provincial Secretary & Registrar | Leopold Macaulay | September 16, 1930 | July 31, 1931 |
| Provincial Secretary & Registrar | George Holmes Challies | July 31, 1931 | July 10, 1934 |
| Treasurer | William Herbert Price | July 16, 1923 | October 18, 1926 |
| Treasurer | Joseph Monteith | October 18, 1926 | September 16, 1930 |
| Treasurer | Edward Arunah Dunlop | September 16, 1930 | January 1, 1934 |
| Treasurer | George Stewart Henry | January 12, 1934 | July 10, 1934 |
Economic production portfolios
| Minister of Agriculture | John Strickler Martin | July 16, 1923 | September 16, 1930 |
| Minister of Agriculture | Thomas Laird Kennedy | September 16, 1930 | July 10, 1934 |
| Minister of Lands and Forests | James W. Lyons | July 16, 1923 | March 2, 1926 |
| Minister of Lands and Forests | Howard Ferguson interim | March 2, 1926 | October 18, 1926 |
| Minister of Lands and Forests | William Finlayson | October 18, 1926 | July 10, 1934 |
| Minister of Mines | Charles McCrea | July 16, 1923 | July 10, 1934 |
Public assets portfolios
| Minister of Public Works | George Stewart Henry | July 16, 1923 | September 16, 1930 |
| Minister of Public Works | Joseph Monteith | September 16, 1930 | January 8, 1934 |
| Minister of Public Works | Leopold Macaulay (Note: Upon appointment as public works minister, Macaulay was styled as styled as Minister of Public Works and Highways) | January 12, 1934 | July 10, 1934 |
| Ministry of Highways | George Stewart Henry | July 16, 1923 | July 31, 1931 |
| Ministry of Highways | Leopold Macaulay | July 31, 1931 | July 10, 1934 |
Social & human services portfolios
| Minister of Education | George Howard Ferguson | July 16, 1923 | December 15, 1930 |
| Minister of Education | George Stewart Henry | December 15, 1930 | July 10, 1934 |
| Minister of Labour | Forbes Godfrey | July 16, 1923 | September 16, 1930 |
| Minister of Labour | Joseph Monteith | September 16, 1930 | January 8, 1934 |
| Minister of Labour | John Robb (Note: Upon being appointed labour minister, Robb was styled Minister of Health and Labour) | January 12, 1934 | July 10, 1934 |
| Minister of Health | Forbes Godfrey | July 16, 1923 | September 16, 1930 |
| Minister of Health | John Robb | September 16, 1930 | July 10, 1934 |
| Minister of Public Welfare (Note: Enacted by legislation on April 2, 1931) | William Martin | September 16, 1930 | July 10, 1934 |
Ministers Without Portfolios
| Ministers Without Portfolios | Adam Beck | July 16, 1923 | August 15, 1925 |
| Ministers Without Portfolios | Leeming Carr | July 16, 1923 | May 15, 1928 |
| Ministers Without Portfolios | John Robert Cooke | July 16, 1923 | July 10, 1934 |
| Ministers Without Portfolios | Thomas Crawford | July 16, 1923 | May 15, 1924 |
| Ministers Without Portfolios | David Jamieson | October 18, 1926 | November 26, 1926 |
| Ministers Without Portfolios | Edward Arunah Dunlop | January 29, 1929 | September 12, 1930 |
| Ministers Without Portfolios | Frederick Thomas Smye | March 21, 1929 | November 15, 1930 |
| Ministers Without Portfolios | Paul Poisson | December 23, 1930 | July 10, 1934 |
| Ministers Without Portfolios | Henry Scholfield | December 23, 1930 | July 10, 1934 |
| Ministers Without Portfolios | James Percy Moore | May 22, 1934 | July 10, 1934 |
