= John Goldie (botanist) =

Scottish botanist and author (1793–1886)

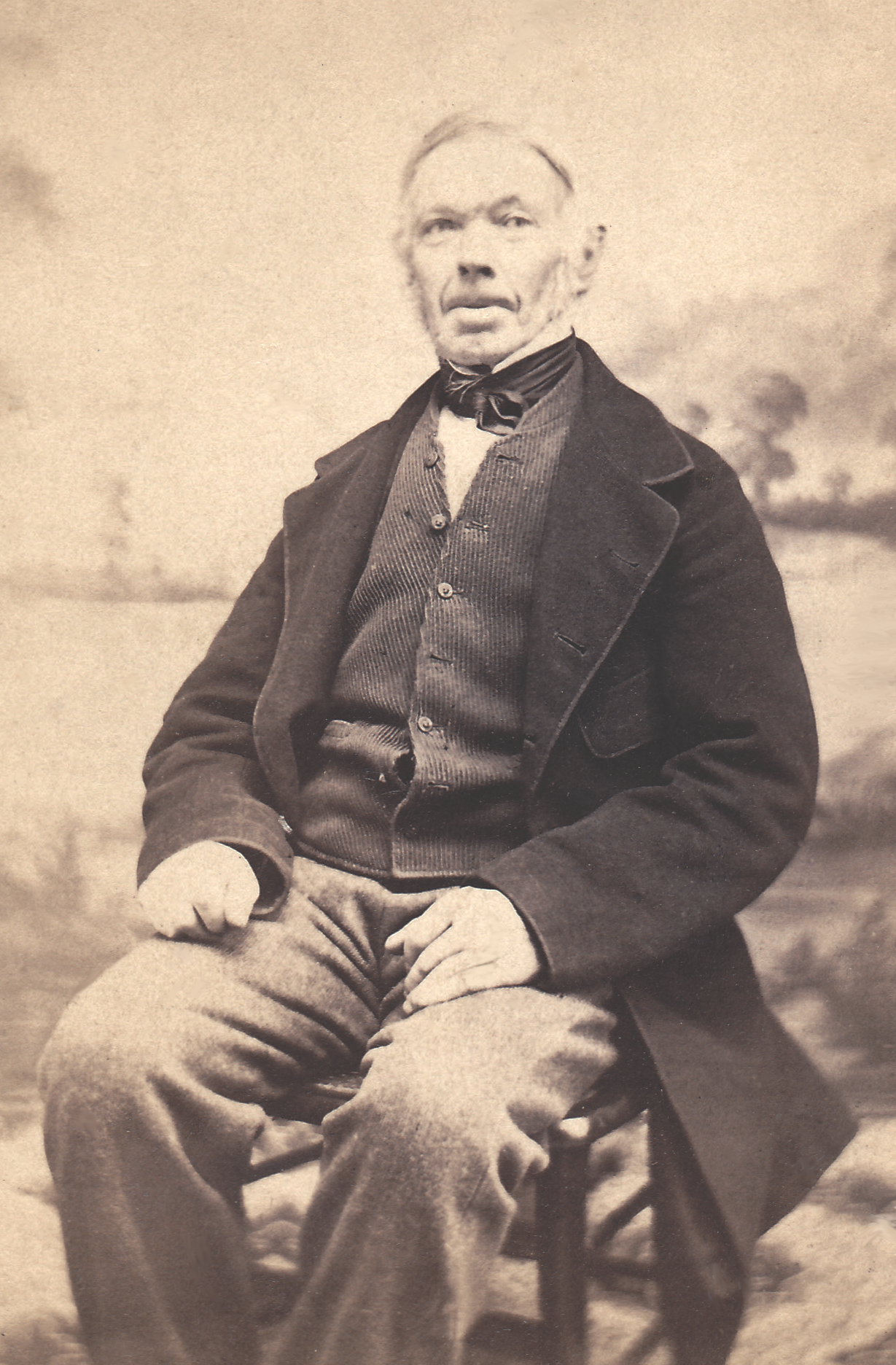
- John Goldie, c. 1860s
- Born: 21 March 1793; Kirkoswald, South Ayrshire, Scotland
- Died: 23 July 1886 (aged 93); Ayr, Ontario, Canada
- Resting place: Ayr Cemetery, Ayr, Ontario
- Education: University of Glasgow
- Known for: Dryopteris goldieana
- Spouse: Margaret Smith
- Scientific career
- Fields: Botany
- Workplaces: Glasgow Botanic Gardens
- Author abbrev. (botany): Goldie

John Goldie (21 March 1793 – 23 July 1886) was a Scottish-born botanist, author, and miller. He is credited with recording the existence of fourteen plant species previously unknown to science including Dryopteris goldieana, Stellaria longipes and Drosera linearis.

== Early life and education ==
Goldie was born in Kirkoswald in 1793, the son of William Goudie and Janet McClure. As a teenager, Goldie had apprenticed as a gardener and was later employed at the Glasgow Botanic Garden where he accumulated most of his knowledge of botany.

Having studied language at the University of Glasgow, Goldie was fluent in Greek, French, and Hebrew, although he never registered for a degree due to financial problems. While in Glasgow, he made the acquaintance of James Smith, a well-known local botanist and florist, and began spending time at his home near Minishant. In 1815, on the day the Battle of Waterloo was fought, Goldie married Smith's daughter Margaret and would go on to have nine children with her.

== Botanical career ==
Shortly after his marriage, the British government decided to send an expedition to the coast of Africa to explore the Congo River. After passing an examination, Goldie was selected to accompany the expedition as a botanist but at the last moment was superseded by someone else. Many of the officers and crew of the expedition contracted and died of coast fever, and the expedition was later abandoned.

In 1817, at the instance of his colleague Sir William Jackson Hooker, Goldie was able to raise enough money to voyage to North America to collect botanical samples. He departed from Leith and landed in Halifax, after having been diverted from his original destination of New York due to bad weather. From Halifax, he traveled to Quebec and collected botanical samples there for two weeks before departing for Montreal. While in Montreal, Goldie met with Frederick Traugott Pursh, a fellow botanist and author of Flora americae septentrionalis; or A Systematic Arrangement and Description of The Plants of North America.

Goldie subsequently crossed the St. Lawrence River and followed the Hudson River down to his original destination of New York. It is possible that the Pine Barrens of eastern New Jersey were known to him as a rich source of plant life, as he traveled directly to the area and began collecting botanical samples. His notes record that he assembled a considerable amount of material, "as large a load as [his] back would carry."

With very little money, Goldie found work as a teacher and stayed in New York during the winter of 1818. In the spring, he returned to Montreal looking to accompany traders heading to the North-Western Territory, but was unable to find any. He decided instead to take another job as a laborer and would spend weekends plant hunting; on one occasion, he explored a short distance up the Ottawa River. In the fall of 1818, Goldie packed up his collection of plants and sent them out to sea. Unfortunately, his first three shipments of collected materials were lost en route to Scotland.

By the winter of 1819, Goldie had accumulated some money making flower designs in Montreal, and decided to set out on one last expedition before returning to Scotland. This journey, which began in early June and ended in late August, is documented in his surviving diary and provides a rare glimpse of life in the sparsely settled land around the Great Lakes following the War of 1812. At end of the year, Goldie returned to Scotland with his specimens intact. He continued to work with the Glasgow Botanical Garden, where he met the young David Douglas, who apprenticed under Goldie for five years.

In 1822, Goldie published Description of some new and rare plants discovered in Canada in 1819 in the Journal of the Edinburgh Philosophical Society. One of the plants which he had brought back with him was given the name Aspidium goldianum, later Dryopteris goldieana, by Sir William Jackson Hooker. Seeds of the newly discovered fern were also propagated in the Glasgow Botanical Garden.

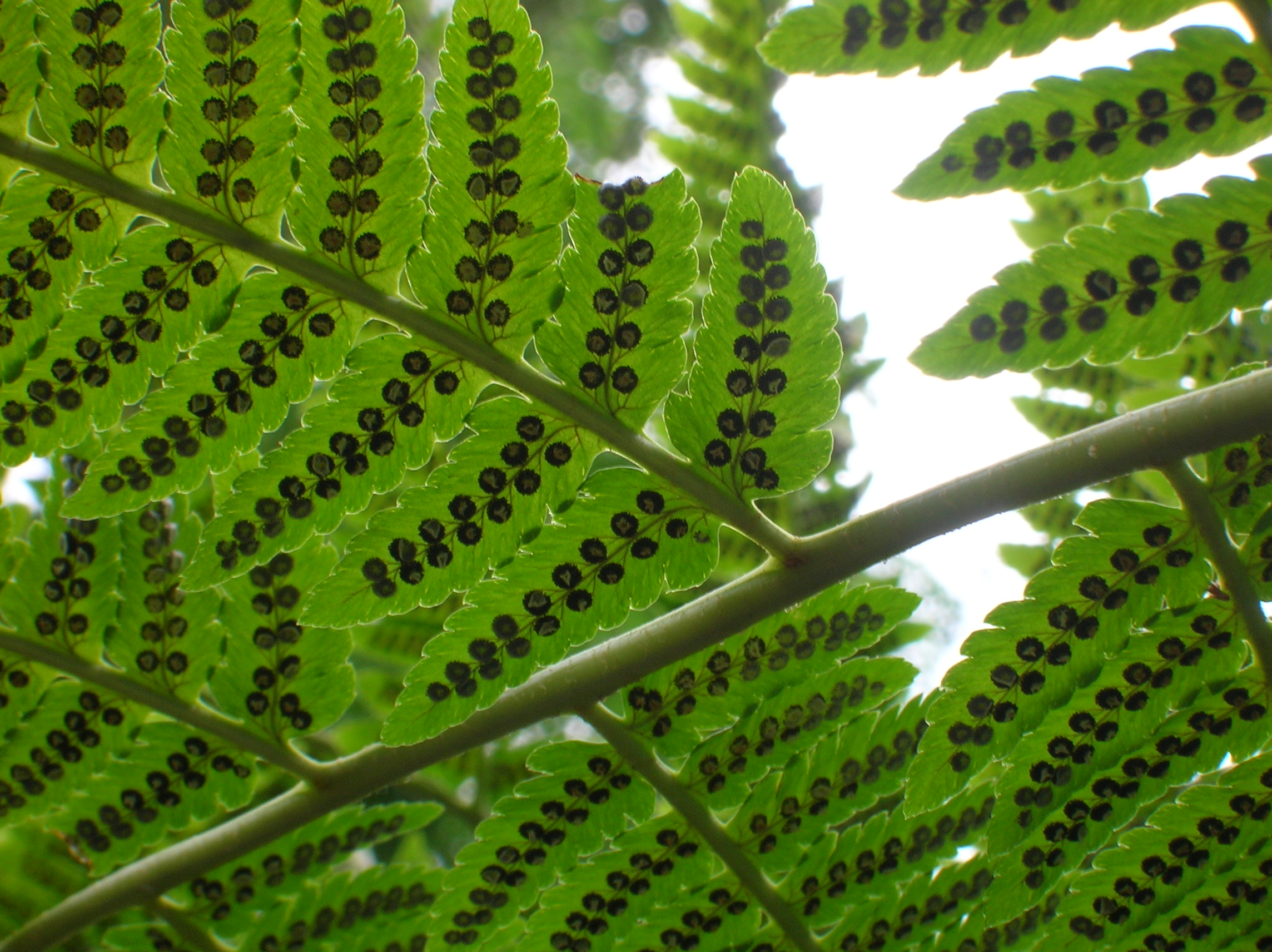
Dryopteris goldieana

In 1824, Goldie traveled to Saint Petersburg, Russia where we was employed by Alexander I, and later by Nicholas I, to assist in establishing the Imperial Botanical Garden.

The standard author abbreviation Goldie is used to indicate this individual as the author when citing a botanical name.

== Family and legacy ==
Upon his return from Saint Petersburg, Goldie set up a nursery business adjacent to the Burns Cottage in Ayr, Scotland to provide his growing family with additional income. With little prospects for an economic future in Scotland by the 1840s, Goldie decided to move the family to Canada in 1844, where he rented and later purchased a farm in Ayr, Ontario. By 1850, the family was operating a grist and oatmeal mill, which was expanded in 1865 to refine local wheat for export to international markets. Having retired from the milling business in 1861, Goldie died in 1886 at the age of 93.

The family established and operated a number of successful businesses throughout Southwestern Ontario, and produced several prominent members. Goldie's eldest son, John, co-founded Goldie & McCulloch, which manufactured steam engines and boilers in Galt. His other son, James, was a leading flour manufacturer who operated the James Goldie Co. Limited in Guelph. James was the father of Thomas Goldie, mayor of Guelph from 1891 to 1892, and Lincoln Goldie, a provincial cabinet minister in the government of Howard Ferguson. Goldie's youngest son, David, operated the Greenfield Mills, later incorporated as the Goldie Milling Company, in Ayr. David was the father of William Goldie, a physician who helped to establish the first full-time chair in medicine in the British Empire.

In 2007, the John Goldie Award for Field Botany was established by the Field Botanists of Ontario, a not-for-profit organization based in Cambridge. The award recognizes individuals who have made a significant contribution to the advancement of field botany in Ontario. Past recipients have included James Scott Pringle (2011), Peter William Ball (2012), Irwin M. Brodo (2017), and John C. Semple (2018).
