= James Harold King =

Canadian politician

Ontario MPP
- In office 1934–1943
- Preceded by: Duncan Paul Munro
- Succeeded by: Leslie Hancock
- Constituency: Wellington South

Personal details
- Born: October 17, 1871 Hastings County, Ontario
- Died: May 10, 1949 (aged 77)
- Party: Liberal
- Spouse: Mary Nicoll (m. 1909)
- Occupation: Physician

James Harold King (October 17, 1871 – May 10, 1949) was a medical doctor and politician in Ontario, Canada. He represented Wellington South in the Legislative Assembly of Ontario from 1934 to 1943 as a Liberal.

The son of James King and Agnes Munn, both natives of Scotland, he was born in Hastings County and was educated in Chatham, in London, at Trinity University and at the University of Western Ontario. In 1909, he married Mary Nicoll. He served as medical officer of health for Guelph and Puslinch townships.

King was first elected to the Ontario assembly in a 1934 by-election held following the death of Duncan Paul Munro. He was reelected in 1937.
