= William Herbert Price =

Canadian politician (1877–1963)

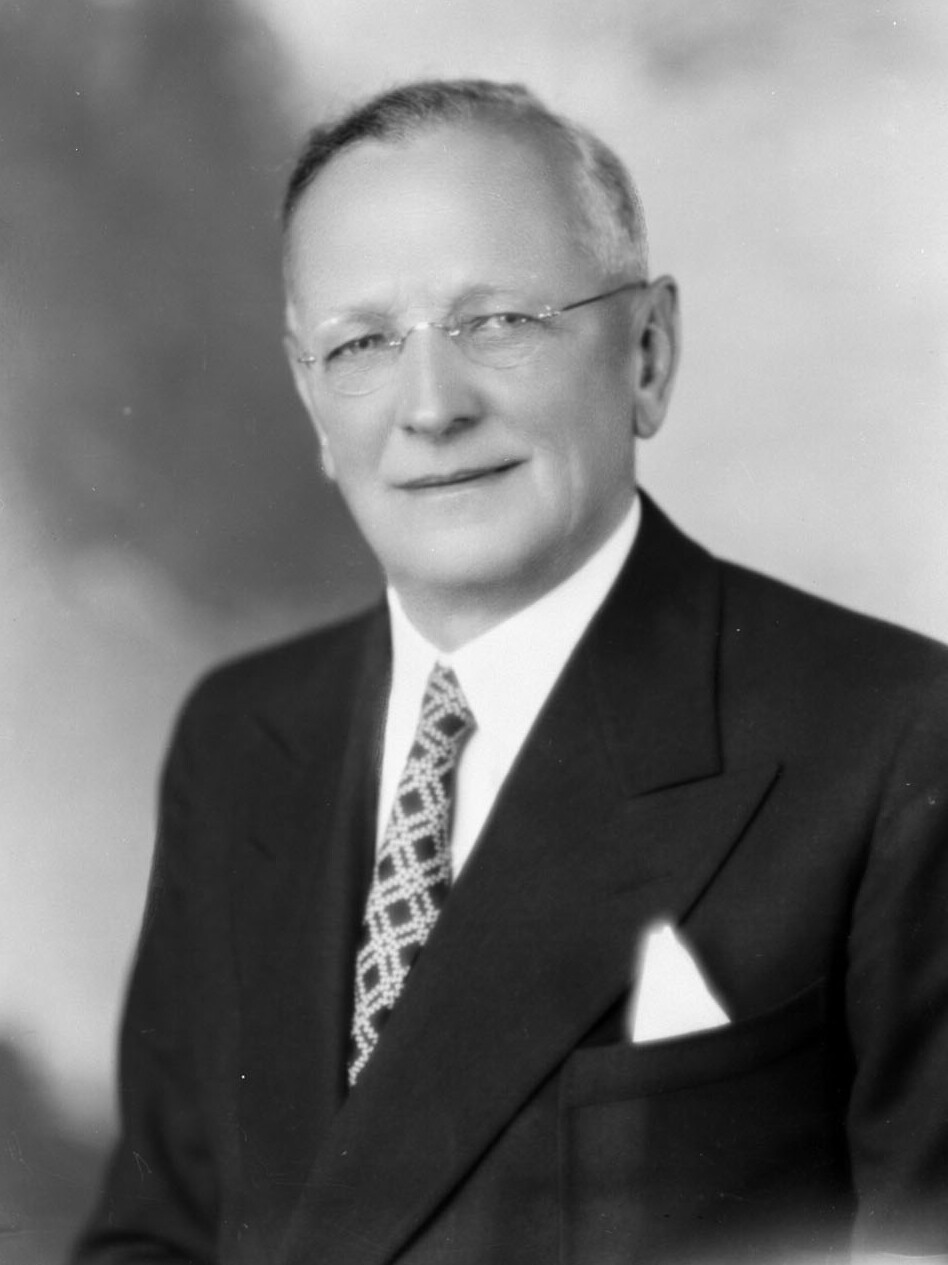
- Price in 1937

Ontario MPP
- In office 1914–1937
- Preceded by: New riding
- Succeeded by: Fred McBrien
- Constituency: Parkdale

Personal details
- Born: May 25, 1877 Owen Sound, Ontario
- Died: December 21, 1963 (aged 86) Toronto, Ontario
- Party: Conservative
- Spouse: Alice Gentles
- Children: 3
- Occupation: Teacher, lawyer

Military service
- Allegiance: Canadian
- Branch/service: Infantry
- Years of service: 1916-1919
- Rank: Lieutenant-Colonel
- Unit: 204th Battalion
- Battles/wars: Western Front

William Herbert Price (May 25, 1877 – December 21, 1963) was a politician in Ontario, Canada. He was a Conservative member of the Legislative Assembly of Ontario from 1914 to 1937 who represented the Toronto riding of Parkdale. He served as Treasurer and Attorney General in the governments of Howard Ferguson and George Stewart Henry.

== Background ==
He was born in Owen Sound, Ontario, the son of William H. Price. He taught school for several years, then studied at Osgoode Hall and the University of Toronto. He was called to the Ontario bar in 1904 and went on to practice as a barrister and solicitor. In 1910, he married Alice Gentles. They had three sons; his middle son, Captain John Gentles Price, of the 1st Battalion Queen's Own Rifles, was killed in action on September 8, 1944, in France during World War II.

During World War I, while still serving as an MLA, he also served as a Lieutenant-Colonel for the 204th Battalion of the Canadian Infantry from 1916 until March 1917, after which he was posted to the British army.

== Politics ==
Price was elected in the 1914 provincial election in the Toronto riding of Parkdale. In 1916 he took a leave of absence to join the army to fight in World War I.

He easily won re-election in the 1919 Ontario general election, even though he spent the previous few years in Europe and not in the legislature. He won re-election, again in the 1923 election that saw United Farmers of Ontario government fall to his party's Conservatives. He was appointed as Treasurer from 1923 to 1926. He was re-elected again in 1926, and was appointed as the Attorney General of Ontario from 1926 to 1934.

After being re-elected in the 1934 Ontario general election, he remained one of the few Conservative cabinet members to remain in the Legislature, as the Liberals won the most seats and formed a majority government. Even though he was presumed to be the leading contender to become the Conservative party's leader, Price announced in May 1936 that he would not seek re-election and would retire at the end of the legislative session. His decision came about two-weeks before the Conservatives were to pick a new leader, and turned it into a wide-open contest.

=== Cabinet posts ===
Henry ministry, Province of Ontario (1930–1934)
Ferguson ministry, Province of Ontario (1923–1930)
Cabinet posts (3)
Predecessor	Office	Successor
William Folger Nickle	Attorney General; 1926-1934	Arthur Roebuck
Peter Smith	Treasurer of Ontario; 1923–1926	Joseph Monteith
