= Ministry of Transportation (Ontario) =

Government ministry in Ontario

- Ministère des transports (French)
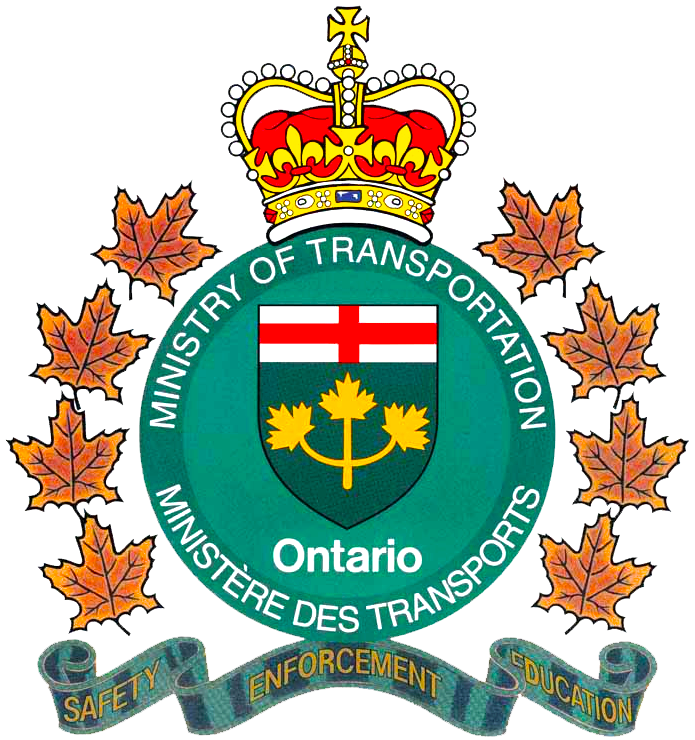

Ministry overview
- Formed: 1916
- Preceding Ministry: Ministry of Transportation and Communications
- Jurisdiction: Government of Ontario
- Headquarters: 77 Wellesley Street West Toronto, Ontario
- Minister responsible: Prabmeet Sarkaria, Minister of Transportation
- Deputy Minister responsible: Douglas Jones, Deputy Minister of Transportation
- Website: www.ontario.ca/page/ministry-transportation

The Ministry of Transportation (MTO) is a provincial ministry of the Government of Ontario responsible for the planning, management and maintenance of transportation infrastructure in the Canadian province of Ontario. The MTO is headquartered in Toronto.

Founded in 1916 as the Department of Public Highways of Ontario, the MTO oversees the province's 16,900 km (10,500 mi) network of highways. This includes the 400-series highways, with the section of Highway 401 that passes through Toronto being the busiest in North America. Three crown agencies, Metrolinx (which oversees GO Transit and the Presto fare card system), Ontario Northland, and the Owen Sound Transportation Company, report to the MTO. The ministry is also responsible for vehicle registration and issuing drivers licences.

== History ==
Early roads in Ontario were cleared when needed for local use and connections to other settlements. Key roads such as Yonge Street and Kingston Road were cleared by order from officials by various parties such as settlers, British Army units (portion of Yonge c. 1795 Queen's Rangers) or private contractors (Toronto to Trent section of Kingston Road c. 1799-1800 by Asa Danforth). Road standards varied (poor in winter or after rainfall) and used by horses or horse drawn stagecoaches.

With the arrival of motor vehicles proper road development and maintenance was needed. The earliest Ontario government office responsible for roads and transportation was the position of the Provincial Instructor in Road-Making, first appointed in 1896 and attached to the Ontario Department of Agriculture. A.W. Campbell held the position of Provincial Instructor in Road-Making from 1896 to 1900 and Director of the Office of the Commissioner of Highways from 1900 until 1910. He was tasked with training Provincial Road Building Instructors. These instructors worked to establish specifications for the almost 90,000 kilometres (56,000 mi) of county- and township- maintained roads.

The name of the office was changed to the Commissioner of Highways and transferred to the Department of Public Works in 1900. By 1910, the office was generally referred to as the Highways Branch. In 1910, W.A. McLean, Provincial Engineer of Highways, succeeded A.W. Campbell as the director of the Highways Branch.

Under considerable pressure from the Ontario Good Roads Association and the ever-increasing number of drivers, which the province itself licensed at that time, the Department of Public Highways was formed in 1916 with the goal of creating a provincial highway network. The department assumed all the functions of the Highways Branch. The department assumed its first highway, the Provincial Highway, on August 21, 1917. On February 20, 1920, the department assumed several hundred kilometres of new highways, formally establishing the provincial highway system. Although established as a separate department, the Department of Public Highways shared ministers with the Department of Public Works prior to 1931 and seems to have been in a quasi-subordinate relationship with this department.

In 1916, the Motor Vehicles Branch was established within the Ontario Department of Public Highways. Prior to this, responsibility for the registering and licensing of motor vehicles rested with the Provincial Secretary (a responsibility it held since 1903). Although there are references to motor vehicle licensing and registration between 1916 and 1918, there is no mention in the Annual Reports of what agency actually performed this function; it is, however, likely that it was a form of, or precursor to, the Motor Vehicles Branch. In 1919, a Registrar of Motor Vehicles, as head of the Motor Vehicles Branch, is clearly identified.

In 1917, the Provincial Highway Act was passed, giving the department authority to maintain and construct leading roads throughout the province as provincial highways (designated King's highways in 1930). The Department of Public Highways was renamed the Department of Highways in 1931 and was assigned its own minister, Leopold Macaulay, though Macaulay later held both portfolios in 1934.

In 1937, the Department of Northern Development, previously responsible for highways in the northern parts of the province, was merged into the Department of Highways, thus bringing all highway work in the province under one administration.

On July 1, 1957, legislation was passed which established a separate Department of Transport, and the Motor Vehicles Branch was transferred to this new department. The new department assumed responsibilities for vehicle licensing, vehicle inspection, driver examination, driver licensing and improvement, traffic engineering, accident claims, and highway safety. In addition, it was responsible for the Ontario Highway Transport Board.

In May 1971, the Department of Transport and the Department of Highways were amalgamated to form the Department of Transportation and Communications. The new department was presided over by the Charles MacNaughton, who had been both the Minister of Highways and the Minister of Transport prior to the amalgamation. The department was renamed the Ministry of Transportation and Communications in 1972 as part of a government wide reorganization.

In September 1987, the responsibilities for communications were transferred to the Ministry of Culture and Communications, and the ministry was renamed the Ministry of Transportation.

== Administration ==
The MTO is in charge of various aspects of transportation in Ontario, including the establishment and maintenance of the provincial highway system, the registration of vehicles and licensing of drivers, and the policing of provincial roads, enforced by the Ontario Provincial Police and the ministry's in-house enforcement program (Commercial vehicle enforcement).

== Agencies ==
The MTO is responsible for three crown agencies:

=== Metrolinx ===
Metrolinx is responsible for the planning and management of the GO Transit network in the Greater Toronto and Hamilton Area, as well as public transit projects including the Presto card system, the Union Pearson Express, and the Ontario Line. Founded in 2006 as a procurement agency for municipal transit systems in the province, it has grown to encompass approximately $30 billion in transport construction projects as of 2020.

=== Owen Sound Transportation Company ===
The Owen Sound Transportation Company (OSTC) was acquired by the province in 1973, and operates four ferries offering freight and passenger service. Based out of Owen Sound, the OSTC was founded as a private company in 1921. The largest ferry operated by the OSTC is the MS Chi-Cheemaun, which operates between Tobermory on the Bruce Peninsula and South Baymouth on Manitoulin Island.

=== Ontario Northland Transportation Commission ===
The Ontario Northland Transportation Commission operates freight and passenger services in Northern Ontario through Ontario Northland Railway (ONR) and the Ontario Northland Motor Coach service. The ONR was founded in 1902 as the Temiskaming and Northern Ontario Railway, and runs the Polar Bear Express train between Cochrane and Moosonee. The Northlander, cancelled in 2012, is expected to resume in 2026.

== Regions ==
MTO region map

The operations division of the MTO is responsible for the maintenance, operations, and management of provincial highways in Ontario. It is divided into five regions.

Region	Main office	Areas served
1 (Central)	Toronto	Durham, Halton, Hamilton, Niagara, Peel, Simcoe, Toronto, York
2 (Western)	London	Brant, Bruce, Chatham-Kent, Dufferin, Elgin, Essex, Grey, Haldimand-Norfolk, Huron, Lambton, Middlesex, Oxford, Perth, Waterloo, Wellington
3 (Eastern)	Kingston	Frontenac, Hastings, Kawartha Lakes, Lanark, Leeds and Grenville, Lennox and Addington, Northumberland, Ottawa, Peterborough, Prescott and Russell, Prince Edward, Renfrew, Stormont, Dundas and Glengarry
4 (Northeastern)	North Bay	Algoma, Cochrane, Greater Sudbury, Haliburton, Manitoulin, Muskoka, Nipissing, Parry Sound, Sudbury, Timiskaming
5 (Northwestern)	Thunder Bay	Kenora, Rainy River, Thunder Bay

== Road maintenance ==
The Parclo interchange was invented by the Ministry of Transportation.

Maintenance work is performed in two different ways:

1. In Maintenance Outsource areas, where MTO staff monitor the road conditions and hire contractors on an as-need basis.
2. In Area Maintenance Contract areas, where one contractor is awarded a contract area and performs all maintenance work except for rehabilitation and new construction.

A list of Area Maintenance contractors currently under contract with the MTO includes:

- Emcon Services Inc.
- Ferrovial Services/Webber Infra
- Fowler Construction Company Ltd.
- IMOS (Maintenance performed by Miller Maintenance)
- C-Highway Maintenance Contracting Inc.
- The 407 ETR Concession Company operates and maintains the stretch of Highway 407 from Burlington to Brougham under a lease from the Government of Ontario until the year 2098
- The 407 East Development Group (407 EDG) maintains stretch of Highway 407 from 407 ETR to Harmony Road and Highway 412
- Blackbird Infrastructure Group maintains stretch of Highway 407 from Harmony Road to Highway 115 and Highway 418
- The Windsor Essex Mobility Group (WEMG) maintains the Herb Gray Parkway, the stretch of Highway 401 connecting to the future Gordie Howe International Bridge through Windsor, Ontario

Area term contracts (ATCs) are the latest maintenance and construction alternative being reviewed by the MTO. ATCs, if they are approved for tender, will cover all maintenance operations now performed by AMC contractors, but will also include annual pavement maintenance and replacement work, bridge rehabilitation, minor capital construction programs and corridor management.

== Transportation enforcement ==
While policing on most MTO-managed roads is provided by the Ontario Provincial Police, highway safety enforcement is also provided by MTO Transportation Enforcement Officers.

Ministry of Transportation Enforcement Officers (TEOs) enforce a variety of provincial highway safety legislation specific to operators of commercial vehicles. Driver hours of service, cargo securement, dangerous goods transportation, weights and dimensions, and vehicle maintenance and roadworthiness are the predominant focus of TEO inspection activities. Ontario's Highway Traffic Act, the Towing and Storage Safety and Enforcement Act, the Compulsory Automobile Insurance Act, and the Dangerous Goods Transportation Act are core pieces of legislation from which TEOs derive their enforcement authorities. TEOs conduct commercial vehicle inspections using a standardized procedure established by the Commercial Vehicle Safety Alliance (CVSA).

Transportation Enforcement Officers inspect commercial vehicles, their loads, and driver's qualifications and documentation. They collect evidence, issue provincial offence notices or summons to court for violations, and testify in court.

Transportation Enforcement Officer deployment ranges from highway patrol and Truck Inspection Station (TIS) duties, audits of commercial vehicle operators, inspection and monitoring of bus and motor-coach operators, and the licensing and monitoring of Motor Vehicle Inspection Stations. Blitz-style joint force operations are periodically conducted in concert with provincial and municipal police.

Although many Transportation Enforcement Officers are licensed vehicle mechanics, most are not. TEOs hail from various backgrounds including driver licensing examination, automobile repair, commercial truck driving and other law enforcement services.

== List of ministers ==
Name	Term of office		Tenure	Political party (Ministry)	Note
Minister of Public Works and Highways					
Findlay G. MacDiarmid	April 8, 1915	November 14, 1919	4 years, 220 days	Conservative (Hearst)	
Frank Campbell Biggs	November 14, 1919	July 16, 1923	3 years, 244 days	United Farmers (Drury)	
George Stewart Henry	July 16, 1923	September 16, 1930	8 years, 15 days	Conservative (Ferguson)	
Minister of Highways			8 years, 15 days	Conservative (Ferguson)	
George Stewart Henry	September 16, 1930	December 15, 1930	8 years, 15 days	Conservative (Ferguson)	
George Stewart Henry	December 15, 1930	July 31, 1931	8 years, 15 days	Conservative (Henry)	While Premier
Leopold Macaulay	July 31, 1931	July 10, 1934	2 years, 344 days	Conservative (Henry)	Concurrently Minister of Public Works (January 12, 1934 – July 10, 1934)
Thomas McQuesten	July 10, 1934	October 21, 1942	9 years, 38 days	Liberal (Hepburn)	Concurrently Minister of Public Works, Minister of Northern Development (from October 12, 1937)
Thomas McQuesten	October 21, 1942	May 18, 1943	9 years, 38 days	Liberal (Conant)	Concurrently Minister of Public Works, Minister of Northern Development (from October 12, 1937)
Thomas McQuesten	May 18, 1943	August 17, 1943	9 years, 38 days	Liberal (Nixon)	Concurrently Minister of Public Works, Minister of Northern Development (from October 12, 1937)
George Doucett	August 17, 1943	October 19, 1948	11 years, 141 days	PC (Drew)	Concurrently Minister of Public Works (August 17, 1943 – October 2, 1951)
George Doucett	October 19, 1948	May 4, 1949	11 years, 141 days	PC (Kennedy)	Concurrently Minister of Public Works (August 17, 1943 – October 2, 1951)
George Doucett	May 4, 1949	January 5, 1955	11 years, 141 days	PC (Frost)	Concurrently Minister of Public Works (August 17, 1943 – October 2, 1951)
James N. Allan	January 5, 1955	April 28, 1958	3 years, 113 days	PC (Frost)	Named Minister of Transport, a new position, on June 26, 1957.
Fred Cass	April 28, 1958	November 8, 1961	3 years, 194 days	PC (Frost)	Separate Ministers of Transport held office during this time: Matthew Dymond (April 28 to December 22, 1958); John Yaremko (December 22, 1958 to November 21, 1960); Leslie Rowntree (November 21, 1960 to October 25, 1962); James Auld (October 25, 1962 to August 14, 1963); Irwin Haskett (August 14, 1963 to March 1, 1971)
William Arthur Goodfellow	November 8, 1961	October 25, 1962	351 days	PC (Robarts)	Separate Ministers of Transport held office during this time: Matthew Dymond (April 28 to December 22, 1958); John Yaremko (December 22, 1958 to November 21, 1960); Leslie Rowntree (November 21, 1960 to October 25, 1962); James Auld (October 25, 1962 to August 14, 1963); Irwin Haskett (August 14, 1963 to March 1, 1971)
Charles MacNaughton	October 25, 1962	November 24, 1966	4 years, 30 days (first instance)	PC (Robarts)	Separate Ministers of Transport held office during this time: Matthew Dymond (April 28 to December 22, 1958); John Yaremko (December 22, 1958 to November 21, 1960); Leslie Rowntree (November 21, 1960 to October 25, 1962); James Auld (October 25, 1962 to August 14, 1963); Irwin Haskett (August 14, 1963 to March 1, 1971)
George Gomme	November 24, 1966	March 1, 1971	4 years, 97 days	PC (Robarts)	Separate Ministers of Transport held office during this time: Matthew Dymond (April 28 to December 22, 1958); John Yaremko (December 22, 1958 to November 21, 1960); Leslie Rowntree (November 21, 1960 to October 25, 1962); James Auld (October 25, 1962 to August 14, 1963); Irwin Haskett (August 14, 1963 to March 1, 1971)
Charles MacNaughton	March 1, 1971	May 28, 1971	338 days (second instance); 5 years, 3 days in totoal	PC (Davis)	Concurrently Minister of Transport
Minister of Transportation and Communications			338 days (second instance); 5 years, 3 days in totoal	PC (Davis)	
Charles MacNaughton	May 28, 1971	February 2, 1972	338 days (second instance); 5 years, 3 days in totoal	PC (Davis)	
Gordon Carton	February 2, 1972	February 26, 1974	2 years, 24 days	PC (Davis)	
John Rhodes	February 26, 1974	October 7, 1975	1 year, 223 days	PC (Davis)	
James W. Snow	October 7, 1975	February 8, 1985	9 years, 124 days	PC (Davis)	
George McCague	February 8, 1985	June 26, 1985	138 days	PC (Miller)	
Ed Fulton	June 26, 1985	September 29, 1987	4 years, 37 days	Liberal (Peterson)	
Minister of Transportation			4 years, 37 days	Liberal (Peterson)	
Ed Fulton	September 29, 1987	August 2, 1989	4 years, 37 days	Liberal (Peterson)	
Bill Wrye	August 2, 1989	October 1, 1990	1 year, 60 days	Liberal (Peterson)	
Ed Philip	October 1, 1990	July 31, 1991	303 days	NDP (Rae)	
Gilles Pouliot	July 31, 1991	October 21, 1994	3 years, 82 days	NDP (Rae)	
Mike Farnan	October 21, 1994	June 26, 1995	248 days	NDP (Rae)	
Al Palladini	June 26, 1995	October 10, 1997	2 years, 106 days	PC (Harris)	
Tony Clement	October 10, 1997	June 17, 1999	1 year, 250 days	PC (Harris)	
David Turnbull	June 17, 1999	February 7, 2001	1 year, 235 days	PC (Harris)	
Brad Clark	February 8, 2001	April 14, 2002	1 year, 65 days	PC (Harris)	
Norm Sterling	April 15, 2002	February 25, 2003	316 days	PC (Eves)	
Frank Klees	February 25, 2003	October 22, 2003	239 days	PC (Eves)	
Harinder Takhar	October 23, 2003	May 23, 2006	2 years, 212 days	Liberal (McGuinty)	
Donna Cansfield	May 23, 2006	October 30, 2007	1 year, 160 days	Liberal (McGuinty)	
Jim Bradley	October 30, 2007	January 18, 2010	2 years, 80 days	Liberal (McGuinty)	
Kathleen Wynne	January 18, 2010	October 20, 2011	1 year, 275 days	Liberal (McGuinty)	
Bob Chiarelli	October 20, 2011	February 11, 2013	1 year, 114 days	Liberal (McGuinty)	Concurrently Minister of Infrastructure
Glen Murray	February 11, 2013	June 24, 2014	1 year, 133 days	Liberal (Wynne)	Concurrently Minister of Infrastructure
Steven Del Duca	June 24, 2014	January 17, 2018	3 years, 207 days	Liberal (Wynne)	
Kathryn McGarry	January 17, 2018	June 29, 2018	163 days	Liberal (Wynne)	
John Yakabuski	June 29, 2018	November 5, 2018	129 days	PC (Ford)	
Jeff Yurek	November 5, 2018	June 20, 2019	227 days	PC (Ford)	
Caroline Mulroney	June 20, 2019	September 4, 2023	4 years, 76 days	PC (Ford)	Associate Minister of Transportation (GTA) is Kinga Surma from June 20, 2019 to June 18, 2021 and Stan Cho from June 18, 2021 to June 24, 2022 (and simply Associate Minister of Transportation until September 4, 2023)
Prabmeet Sarkaria	September 4, 2023	present	3 years, 72 days	PC (Ford)	Associate Minister of Transportation is Todd McCarthy from September 4–20, 2023; the position is thereafter vacant

== See also ==
- Connecting Link
- Driver's licences in Ontario
- Ontario's Drive Clean
- Ontario tall-wall
- Partial cloverleaf interchange
- Vehicle registration plates of Ontario

== Bibliography ==
- Shragge, John; Bagnato, Sharon (1984). From Footpaths to Freeways. Ontario Ministry of Transportation and Communications, Historical Committee. ISBN 0-7743-9388-2.
