= Frank Campbell Biggs =

Canadian politician

Ontario MPP
- In office 1919–1926
- Preceded by: Arthur Frederick Rykert
- Succeeded by: Alex Laurence Shaver
- Constituency: Wentworth North

Personal details
- Born: September 13, 1881 Brantford, Ontario
- Died: March 27, 1942 (aged 69) Redlands, California
- Party: United Farmers of Ontario
- Spouse: Beulah Howell
- Occupation: Dairy farmer

Frank Campbell Biggs (September 13, 1881 – March 27, 1942) was a United Farmers of Ontario member of the Legislative Assembly of Ontario who represented Wentworth North from 1919 to 1926. He served in the cabinet for the Ernest Charles Drury Coalition government from 1919 to 1923 as Minister of Public Works and Minister of Public Highways.

Biggs was a farmer, the son of Richard L. Biggs (1847–1925) and Ella A. Howell (1885–1932), and was educated in Dundas, Guelph and Hamilton.

Biggs served as warden for Wentworth County and reeve for Beverly Township, Ontario.

He raised cattle and was a director of the Wentworth Agricultural Society.

Biggs was said to be the first in the county to have used electric milking and cooling machines.

As Minister of Highways, he initiated the development of the province's system of paved highways.

His uncle Samuel Clarke Biggs was a member of the Manitoba legislature.

Biggs left the Legislature in 1926 and died in Redlands, California in 1942.

He is interred at Mount Zion Cemetery in Beverly Township, Wentworth County, Ontario with his wife Beulah Howell (1885–1965).

== Cabinet posts ==
Drury ministry, Province of Ontario (1919–1923)
Cabinet post (1)
Predecessor	Office	Successor
Findlay George MacDiarmid	Minister of Public Works and Highways; 1919-1923	George Stewart Henry
