= 204th Battalion (Beavers), CEF =

The 204th (Toronto Beavers) Battalion, CEF was a unit in the Canadian Expeditionary Force during the First World War. Based in Toronto, Ontario, the unit began recruiting during the winter of 1915/16 in that city and surrounding district.

According to a local paper, the 204th were recruiting at a rate of 450 per month, and since authorization had raised $27,000 for recruiting expenses. This source claimed that the 204th held the record for recruiting among units authorized in Toronto since 1916.

The 204th were quartered at the Government and Transportation buildings at the Exhibition Camp, on the Canadian National Exhibition grounds in Toronto.

On March 16, 1917, the colours of the 204th (Toronto Beavers) Battalion were deposited in the Legislative Assembly Chamber at the Ontario Parliament Buildings. The unit marched from their quarters at Exhibition Camp to the Parliament Buildings headed by their battalion band. Family members witnessed the ceremony of depositing the colours for safe-keeping until after the war. The unit was paraded at full strength outside the building with the men standing at a salute as the colours passed through the doors carried by Lieutenant-Colonel William Herbert Price, and Lieutenant Hitchens with an escort of 40 men. Sir William Howard Hearst was in attendance among other prominent local figures.

On March 19 it was announced that the 204th would soon be leaving Toronto for eastern Canada to continue with their training.

After sailing to England in March 1917, the battalion was absorbed into the 2nd Reserve Battalion on May 4, 1917. The 204th (Toronto Beavers) Battalion, CEF had one Officer Commanding: Lieutenant-Colonel Price. Price was a member for the Parkdale electoral district in the Legislative Assembly of Ontario, and was a Barrister.

The fate of the 204th was discussed in a July 1917 interview with Major Ernest George Switzer, who had gone overseas as second in command of the 204th. Switzer had returned to his home in July 1917 and was interviewed by a local reporter. He explained that most of the men of the 204th went to the 3rd and 75th Battalions, and some went into the ranks of the 5th Division.

After the war a battalion association was established for veterans of the 204th. In June 1919 nearly 400 veterans of the 204th gathered at Victoria Hall in Toronto for the purpose of forming this battalion association. The officers elected included Lieutenant-Colonel Price as honorary president.

The lobby of Old City Hall (Toronto) bears an ornate plaque in honour of the former 204th men who died during their military service in the First World War. 102 names are listed on this plaque, but this may be incomplete. Toronto's Cenotaph is directly in front of this building.
