= Alex Laurence Shaver =

Canadian politician from Ontario

Member of the Ontario Provincial Parliament for Wentworth North
- In office December 1, 1926 – April 3, 1934
- Preceded by: Frank Campbell Biggs
- Succeeded by: constituency abolished

Personal details
- Party: Conservative

Alex Laurence Shaver was a Canadian politician from the Conservative Party of Ontario. He represented Wentworth North in the Legislative Assembly of Ontario from 1926 to 1934.

== See also ==
- 17th Parliament of Ontario
- 18th Parliament of Ontario
