= Thomas Goldie =

Canadian politician

His Worship Thomas Goldie

7th Mayor of Guelph, Ontario
- In office 1891 – 1892
- Preceded by: Thomas Gowdy
- Succeeded by: W.G Smith

Personal details
- Born: Thomas Goldie; July 9, 1850 Paterson, New Jersey, U.S.
- Died: February 2, 1892 (aged 41) Guelph, Ontario, Canada
- Party: Liberal-Conservative

Thomas Goldie (July 9, 1850 – February 2, 1892) was a businessman, politician and early promoter of field sports in Ontario. A secretary for the Guelph Maple Leafs, he also served as mayor of Guelph from 1891 to 1892.

== Biography ==
=== Early life ===
Born in Paterson, New Jersey, the son of James Goldie and Frances Owen, Goldie moved to Guelph, Ontario with his parents in 1860 where his father established a successful milling business. His grandfather was John Goldie, a botanist originally from Ayrshire, Scotland who toured Upper Canada in the early nineteenth century and settled in Ayr, Ontario in 1844. Goldie received his education at McGill College, now McGill University, and Eastman's National Business College in Poughkeepsie, New York. Upon completing his education, he entered his father's milling enterprise and assumed a managerial position.

=== Career ===
Following his involvement in his family's business, he subsequently became instrumental in establishing the Guelph Junction Railway in 1886, and later served as its director. Goldie was additionally involved in the operation of several insurance firms, including the Gore Fire Insurance Company the Canadian Milliers Mutual Fire Association and the Wellington Mutual Fire Insurance Company. He also served as president of the Millers and Manufacturers Insurance Company.

Goldie had taken an active interest in public life since arriving in Guelph. He sat on the school board and from 1881 to 1890 was an alderman. In the 1891 mayoral election, he was elected Mayor of Guelph with a majority of five hundred votes and was acclaimed the following year. Cited as one of the community's most popular nineteenth century mayors, Goldie was well known for his policies of modernization, as during his tenure Guelph hired its first civil engineer. On a more national-scale, he was conservative in his politics, and served as president of the Liberal-Conservative Association of South Wellington from 1888 to 1892. His brother Lincoln served as a Conservative member in the Legislative Assembly of Ontario, and his father was a perennial Conservative candidate for the federal riding of Wellington South.

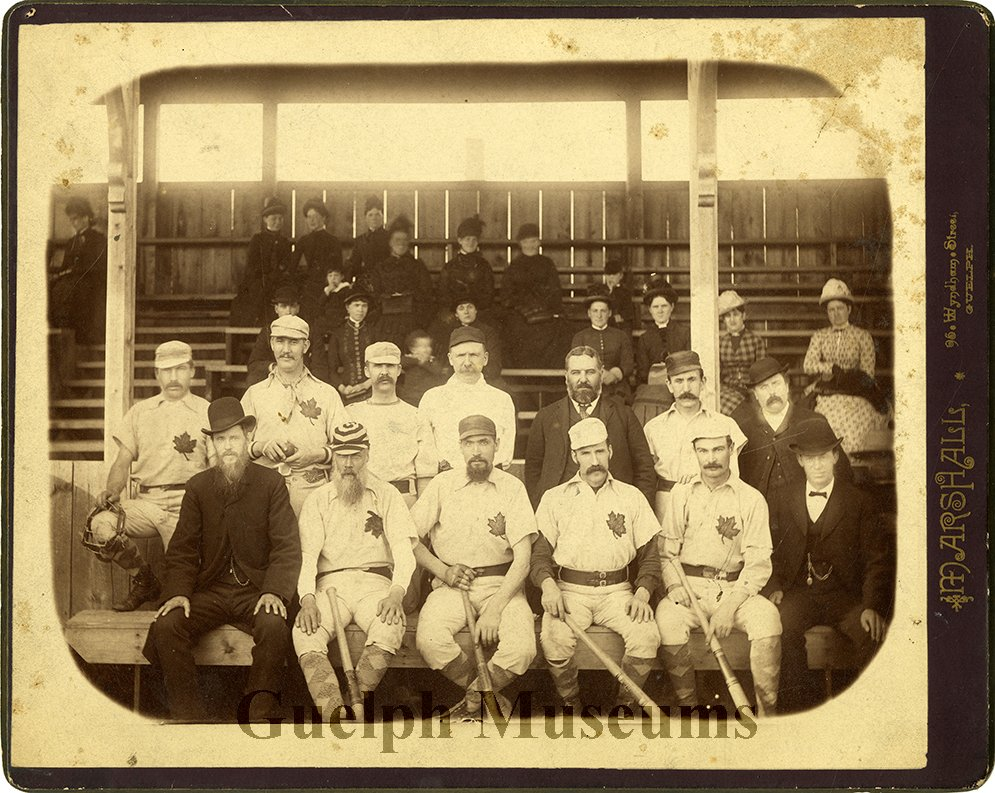
Goldie and Sleeman with the Guelph Maple Leafs in 1874

=== Involvement in sports ===
However, despite his successful careers in both industry and politics, Goldie is most prominently remembered for his involvement and promotion of amateur field sports in Ontario. Though he was an ardent cricket and lacrosse enthusiast, Goldie was most prominent in the sport of baseball. In the 1870s, he became secretary for the Guelph Maples Leafs shortly after their 1869 victory in the Canadian Silver Ball Championship. In 1874, the team received international acclaim when it won the world semi-professional championship in Watertown, New York. Along with the team's president, the prominent brewer and future mayor of Guelph George Sleeman, Goldie sought to capitalize on the popularity following this victory to enhance the image of Guelph.

This interest by both men in associating sport with civic promotion was typical, according to sports historian William Humber, of an era “when leagues meant little, and the size of a town meant less than the promotional elan of some local patron who wanted to put his town on the map”. During the early days of baseball in Guelph, the sport reflected the varied social composition of the city. It was an ideal social equalizer, as it allowed young men from prominent and privileged families, such as Goldie's sons, to play with those from families of less means. The Guelph champions of 1869 included “locally born machinists, as well as a butcher, a tinsmith, a miller, and a Methodist clergyman.” By the mid-1880s, however, the team was facing financial trouble in the semi-professional circuit. Its glory days became overshadowed by the retirement of players and narrowing profit-margins which forced Sleeman to disband the team in 1886.

Following this dissolution, Goldie shifted his interests to other sports such as lacrosse, cricket, curling, horse racing and speed skating. Goldie's personal reputation as an athlete was in cricket, his favourite sport, which he played in his youth as a member of Toronto's Albany Club. In 1891, he was the star of the annual match in Guelph which pitted the municipal council against the school board. While serving as mayor, he simultaneously acted as president of the Ontario Cricket Association in 1892. However, Goldie would contract pneumonia and die in office that same year aged 41.

Goldie's contributions to the sporting, business and municipal life of Ontario were warmly remembered in tributes published in Toronto and Guelph newspapers, which praised him for his amiable nature, generosity, and public service. The Toronto World affectionately described him as “one of Toronto's most welcome visitors. . . . None was more fond of him than the Queen City Cricketers. His funeral was reported in the Guelph Daily Mercury as attracting over two thousand people, with a procession that included over four hundred carriages.
