= Lincoln Goldie =

Canadian politician

Provincial Secretary of Ontario
- In office 1923–1930
- Premier: Howard Ferguson
- Preceded by: Harry Nixon
- Succeeded by: Leopold Macaulay

Ontario MPP
- In office 1923–1931
- Preceded by: Caleb Henry Buckland
- Succeeded by: Duncan Paul Munro
- Constituency: Wellington South

Personal details
- Born: November 11, 1864 Guelph, Ontario, Canada
- Died: September 19, 1931 (aged 66) Wellington, Ontario, Canada
- Party: Conservative
- Spouse: Estelle A. Bricker
- Occupation: Miller

Lincoln Goldie (November 11, 1864 – September 19, 1931) was an industrialist and politician in Ontario, Canada. He represented Wellington South in the Legislative Assembly of Ontario from 1923 to 1931 as a Conservative member. He served as Provincial Secretary and Registrar of Ontario in the government of Howard Ferguson.

== Background ==
Goldie was born in Guelph, Ontario, in 1864, one of five sons of James Goldie and Frances Owen. His father was the son of John Goldie, a botanist, and had been one of the leading flour manufacturers in the province as president of the James Goldie Co. Limited and of the Ontario Millers’ Association. James was a perennial candidate of the Conservative Party, having unsuccessfully contested the federal riding of Wellington South in five elections. Goldie's brother was Thomas Goldie, an early promoter of field sports in Ontario who served as mayor of Guelph from 1891 to 1892. In 1902, Goldie was married to Estelle A. Bricker. They had a son, James, and a daughter, Margaret, who married neurologist Herbert Jasper.

Having been educated at Guelph, Goldie served for many years as manager of the James Goldie Co. Limited established by his father. As a representative of the company, Goldie was present at several conferences organized in 1902 by E. W. B. Snider and Daniel B. Detweiler to draft a report to the Ontario government on the benefits of making hydroelectric power generated at Niagara Falls available to the rest of the province. These efforts eventually led to the organization of Ontario Hydro in 1906 following the election of James Whitney as premier. During the First World War, he was a member of the Dominion Wheat Board. Having retired from the milling industry in 1918, The Globe recorded that "it was partly due to the tremendous popularity that he gained in his business associations that he achieved such great success when he entered politics a few years later."

== Political career ==
In the 1923 Ontario general election, Goldie was elected to represent Wellington South in the Legislative Assembly of Ontario as a member of the Conservative Party. A week after the election, Howard Ferguson asked Goldie to become a member of his cabinet as Provincial Secretary and Registrar of Ontario, a position he held from 1923 to 1930. As a member of the Ferguson cabinet, Goldie sat on several standing committees throughout his tenure, including the standing committees on Municipal Law, Agriculture and Colonization, Privileges and Elections, and Game and Fish.

As Provincial Secretary, Goldie was primarily involved in the management of provincial civic institutions, namely hospitals, insane asylums and prisons. As chairman of the Social Service Council, he spoke of his "personal interest in the case of the feeble-minded," affirming that the Ferguson government would do everything in its power to solve the problem of providing adequate care to those with mental illness. On November 27, 1924, Goldie officially opened a new $3,500,000 civic hospital in Ottawa and presided over the opening ceremony of the Canadian Red Cross Hospital there the following year.

In 1927, Goldie implemented a program that included the organization of a dental service for all provincial inmates in addition to the training of occupational therapists for work in prisons. Furthermore, following the case of a priest who had been wrongly admitted to an insane asylum, Goldie also took the initiative of appointing independent visiting committees that would conduct monthly inspections of provincial insane asylums to ensure they were not admitting sane patients. These committees were first implemented in Hamilton and were to be made up of "leading citizens", with Goldie stating the government's objective of fostering a sympathetic link between the public and insane asylums to ensure that no wrongful admittances would occur in the future. That same year, Goldie was sued by a Mr. W. E. Bastedo for $100,000 in damages for comments allegedly made to a Toronto paper about Mr. Bastedo's arrest and detention in a psychopathic institution.

Following a period of ill health, Goldie resigned the position of Provincial Secretary on September 14, 1930. Having kept his seat in the legislature, Goldie died in office on September 19, 1931, at the age of 66.

=== Cabinet positions ===
Ferguson ministry, Province of Ontario (1923–1930)
Cabinet post (1)
Predecessor	Office	Successor
Harry Nixon	Provincial Secretary and Registrar; 1923-1930	Leopold Macaulay
