= Duncan Paul Munro =

Canadian politician

Ontario MPP
- In office 1931–1934
- Preceded by: Lincoln Goldie
- Succeeded by: James Harold King
- Constituency: Wellington South

Personal details
- Born: September 25, 1896 Manitoba, Canada
- Died: July 1, 1934 (aged 37) Waterdown, Ontario
- Party: Liberal
- Occupation: Lawyer

Duncan Paul Munro (September 25, 1896 – July 1, 1934) was a lawyer and political figure in Ontario. He represented Wellington South in the Legislative Assembly of Ontario from 1931 to 1934 as a Liberal.

He was born in Manitoba, the son of a minister in the Disciples of Christ Church, and came to Hamilton with his family. Munro moved to Guelph just before World War I. He served with the 29th Battery during the war. After the war, Munro studied at Osgoode Hall and joined a law firm in Guelph. He was elected to the assembly in a 1931 by-election held following the death of Lincoln Goldie. Munro died in office as the result of an automobile accident in the Waterdown area, while travelling from Hamilton to Toronto. He was 37.
