= George Joseph Smith (Canadian politician) =

Canadian politician from Ontario

Member of the Ontario Provincial Parliament for Greenwood
- In office December 1, 1926 – April 3, 1934
- Preceded by: constituency created
- Succeeded by: constituency dissolved

Personal details
- Party: Progressive Conservative

George Joseph Smith was a Canadian politician from the Progressive Conservative Party of Ontario. He represented Greenwood in the Legislative Assembly of Ontario from 1926 to 1934.

== See also ==
- 18th Parliament of Ontario
