= William Donald Ross =

14th Lieutenant Governor of Ontario

The Honourable William Donald Ross
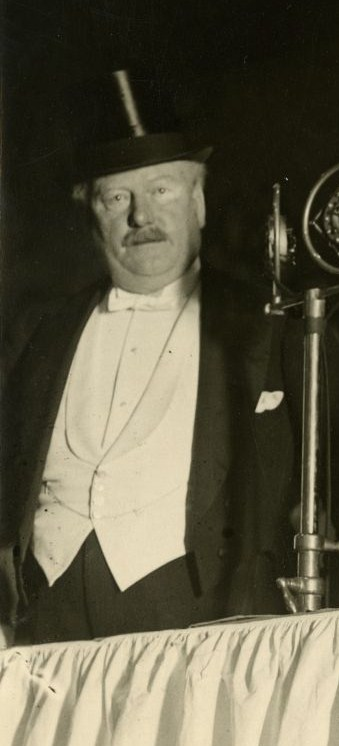
- William Donald Ross in 1929

14th Lieutenant Governor of Ontario
- In office January 12, 1927 – October 25, 1931
- Monarch: George V
- Governors General: The Earl of Willingdon; The Earl of Bessborough
- Premier: Howard Ferguson; George Stewart Henry
- Preceded by: Henry Cockshutt
- Succeeded by: William Mulock (acting)

Personal details
- Born: June 20, 1869 Bras d'Or, Nova Scotia
- Died: June 25, 1947 (aged 78) Toronto, Ontario
- Spouse(s): Susan Archibald McGregor; Isabel MacKay
- Children: Donald, Isabel, Susan, Jean and John
- Occupation: Financier, banker
- Profession: Politician

William Donald Ross (June 20, 1869 – June 25, 1947), was a financier, banker and the 14th Lieutenant Governor of Ontario.

Born in 1869 in Bras d'Or, Nova Scotia, Ross went to work for the Bank of Nova Scotia emptying wastebaskets at the age of 14. The family farm had failed and Ross left school in order to earn money . He rose through the ranks, becoming manager of branches in Stellarton and New Glasgow before becoming manager of the Charlottetown branch at the age of 24.

In 1901, he joined the Ministry of Finance in Ottawa before becoming general manager of the Metropolitan Bank of Toronto and moving to Toronto with his wife and children. In his new city, Ross helped find the funds to found Branksome Hall, a new private school for girls, operated by his cousin. In 1914, the Metropolitan Bank was acquired by the Bank of Nova Scotia, where Ross would ultimately become vice-president and sit on the board of directors.

Ross's first wife, Susan Archibald McGregor, died in 1909. Her father would become Lieutenant Governor of Nova Scotia. They had three children: Donald, Isabel and Susan. He later married Isabel MacKay and they had two children: Jean and John.

A supporter of and fundraiser for the Liberal Party of Canada, Ross was appointed as Lieutenant Governor of Ontario by Governor General Freeman Freeman-Thomas, 1st Marquess of Willingdon, on the advice of William Lyon Mackenzie King, in 1926. He asked to be relieved from office in 1931 due to the onset of the Great Depression as his income from private investments declined and he was no longer sufficient to supplement the $10,000 annual salary he received in his vice-regal role.

In 1937, Ross became co-owner of the Toronto Maple Leafs baseball team. His son Donald became club president.

He died in Toronto in 1947.

Government offices
Preceded by Henry Cockshutt	Lieutenant Governor of Ontario; 1927–1931	Succeeded by Sir William Mulock (acting)
