= John Strickler Martin =

Canadian politician

John Martin

Ontario MPP
- In office 1926–1931
- Preceded by: New riding
- Succeeded by: Arthur Campbell Burt
- Constituency: Norfolk
- In office 1923–1926
- Preceded by: Joseph Cridland
- Succeeded by: Riding abolished
- Constituency: Norfolk South

Personal details
- Born: October 11, 1875 Haldimand County, Ontario
- Died: May 13, 1931 (aged 55) Port Dover, Ontario
- Party: Conservative
- Spouse: Lillian Else (m. 1909)
- Occupation: Farmer

John Strickler Martin (October 11, 1875 – May 13, 1931) was an Ontario farmer and political figure. He represented Norfolk South and then Norfolk in the Legislative Assembly of Ontario as a Conservative member from 1923 to 1931. Martin was also a teacher, piano and organ merchandiser, famed White Wyandotte chicken farmer, Reeve of Port Dover, and the Grand Master Mason of the Grand Lodge of Canada.

Martin was born in Haldimand County, Ontario (Walpole Township). He was the eldest child of George and Clara (Strickler) Martin and educated in Port Dover and at Toronto University. In 1909, he married Lillian Else. He taught at the local high school for a number of years. Martin was chair for the local Board of Trade and served as reeve for Port Dover from 1922 to 1923. He bred poultry and raised cattle on his farm.

Martin served as Minister of Agriculture for the province from 1923 to 1930. He died in office in 1931.

Ferguson ministry, Province of Ontario (1923–1930)
Cabinet post (1)
Predecessor	Office	Successor
Manning Doherty	Minister of Agriculture; 1926-1930	Thomas Laird Kennedy
