= William Newman (Canadian politician) =

Canadian politician

Ontario MPP
- In office 1934–1937
- Preceded by: New riding
- Succeeded by: Leslie Frost
- Constituency: Victoria
- In office 1926–1934
- Preceded by: James Raglan Mark
- Succeeded by: Riding abolished
- Constituency: Victoria North

Personal details
- Born: January 12, 1873 Grenville County, Ontario
- Died: October 21, 1953 (aged 80) Kingston, Ontario
- Party: Liberal
- Spouse: Sarah Evelyn Allen (m. 1903)
- Children: 1
- Occupation: Farmer

William Newman (January 12, 1873 – October 21, 1953) was an Ontario farmer and political figure. A Liberal member in the Legislative Assembly of Ontario, he represented Victoria North from 1926 to 1934 and Victoria from 1934 to 1937.

He was born in Edwardsburgh Township, Grenville County, Ontario, the son of John W. Newman. He was educated in Prescott and Kingston. In 1903, he married a Miss Evelyn Allen, and they had one son, Allen. He raised dairy cattle near Lorneville and was president of the Eastern Ontario Dairymans Association and the Eastern Ontario Creameries Association.
