= Leopold Macaulay =

Canadian politician (1887–1979)

Ontario MPP
- In office 1926–1943
- Preceded by: New riding
- Succeeded by: Ted Jolliffe
- Constituency: York South

Personal details
- Born: 25 November 1887 Peterborough, Ontario
- Died: 24 December 1979 (aged 92) Toronto, Ontario
- Party: Progressive Conservative Party of Ontario
- Spouse: Hazel Charlton Haight (m. 1915)

Leopold Macaulay (25 November 1887 – 24 December 1979) was a Canadian politician and lawyer, born in Peterborough, Ontario.

Macaulay was a Conservative member of the Legislative Assembly of Ontario. He was first elected as Member of the Legislative Assembly (MLA) for the Toronto area riding of York South in 1926. He was brought into the cabinet as Provincial Secretary and Registrar in September 1930 in the last few weeks of the administration of Ontario Premier George Howard Ferguson. He was retained in that position when Ferguson's successor, George Henry formed his cabinet in December.

Macaulay went on to serve as Minister of Highways from 1931 to 1934 and also Minister of Public Works for six months before the defeat of the Henry government by Mitchell Hepburn's Ontario Liberal Party in the 1934 Ontario election.

Macaulay kept his seat through the election and, in 1936, he was a candidate in the Ontario Conservative leadership convention placing fourth. He remained in the legislature until losing his seat in the 1943 Ontario election to Ontario Co-operative Commonwealth Federation leader Ted Jolliffe.

He also served on the Board of Regents of Victoria University, University of Toronto from 1932 to 1972, serving as chair from 1942 to 1951.

Government offices
Preceded by George Stewart Henry	Minister of Public Works and Highways; 1931–1934	Succeeded by Thomas McQuesten
