= George Stewart Henry =

Canadian politician

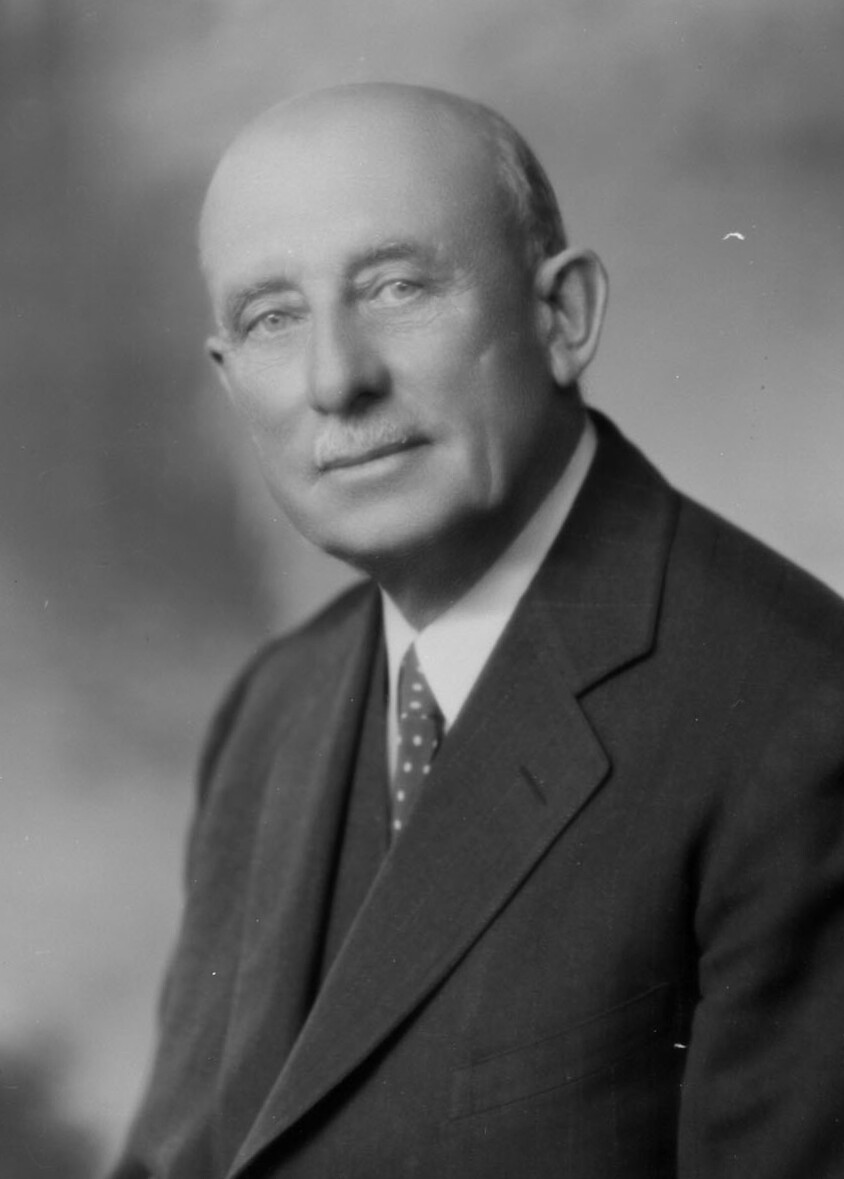
- Henry, c. 1941

10th Premier of Ontario
- In office December 15, 1930 – July 10, 1934
- Monarch: George V
- Lieutenant Governor: William Donald Ross; William Mulock (acting); Herbert A. Bruce
- Preceded by: Howard Ferguson
- Succeeded by: Mitchell Hepburn

Member of Provincial Parliament
- In office September 8, 1913 – August 4, 1943
- Preceded by: Alexander McCowan
- Succeeded by: Agnes Macphail
- Constituency: York East

Personal details
- Born: July 16, 1871 King Township, Ontario
- Died: September 2, 1958 (aged 87) Toronto, Ontario
- Resting place: Mount Pleasant Cemetery, Toronto
- Party: Progressive Conservative
- Spouse: Anna Ketha Pickett
- Education: University of Toronto
- Occupation: Farmer, Lawyer

George Stewart Henry (July 16, 1871 – September 2, 1958) was a farmer, businessman and politician in Ontario, Canada. He served as the tenth premier of Ontario from 1930 to 1934. He had acted as minister of highways while Ontario greatly expanded its highway system. Henry continued the expansion as premier, but his party did not provide relief during the Great Depression and lost the 1934 election.

== Background ==
Henry was born in Township of King, York County, Ontario, the son of William and Louisa Henry (née Stewart).

He attended Upper Canada College for high school and moved on to the University of Toronto, where he received a Bachelor of Arts. He earned his LL.B. at Osgoode Hall Law School. He also spent a year at the University of Toronto's Ontario Agricultural College in Guelph and decided to become a farmer in East York, Ontario.

He was a member of York Township Council from 1903 to 1910, was Township reeve from 1906 to 1910, and elected warden of York County in 1909.

== Political career ==
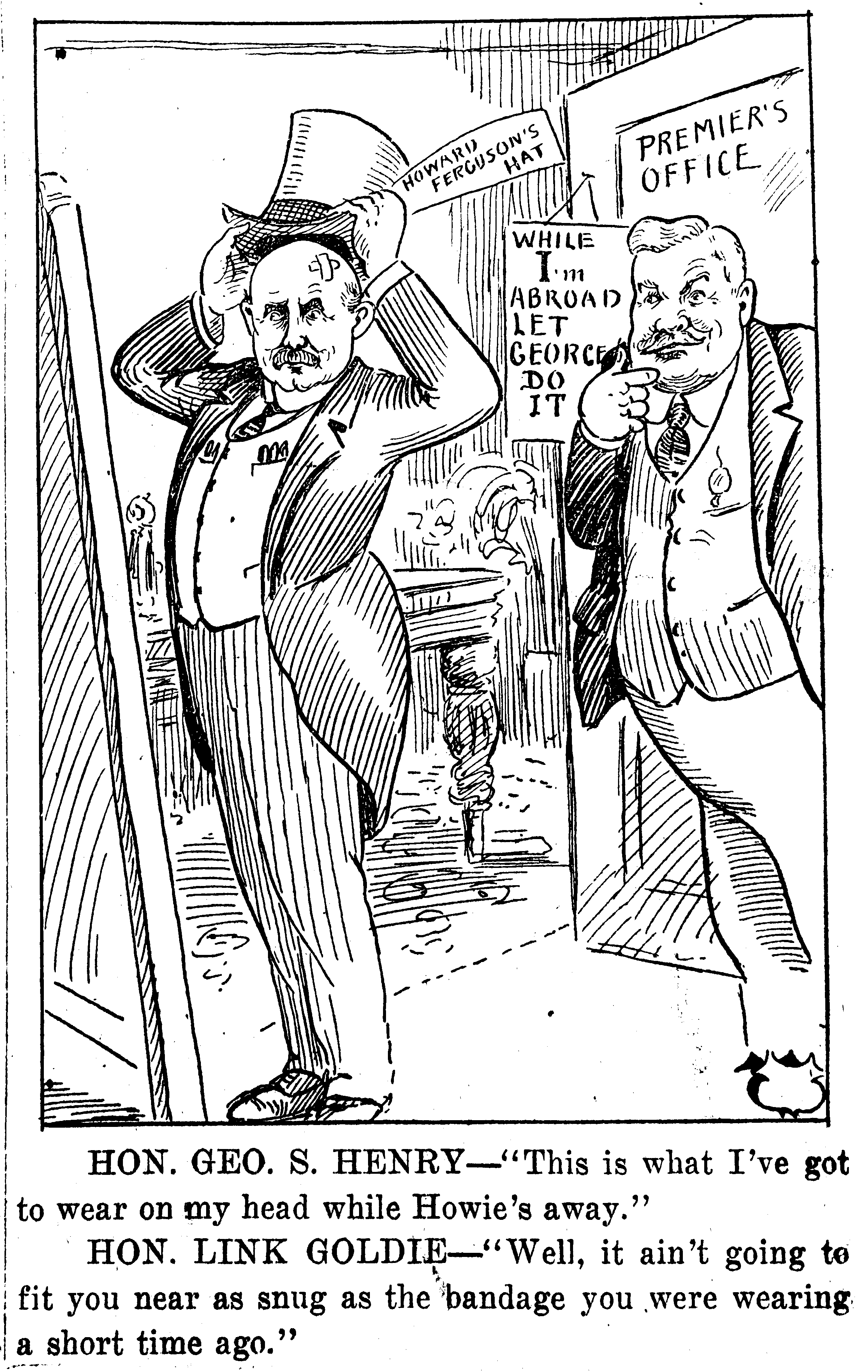
Political cartoon depicting Henry and Lincoln Goldie during the tenure of Howard Ferguson

He was elected to the Legislative Assembly of Ontario in 1913 as a Conservative in the riding of York East. In 1918, he was appointed as Minister of Agriculture. In 1920, he ran for the leadership of the provincial Conservatives at that party's first-ever leadership convention but lost to Howard Ferguson who led the party to victory in the subsequent general election. From 1923 to 1930, Henry served as Minister of Highways in the Ferguson government and expanded on the highway system that was initiated by the previous government of Ernest C. Drury. When Ferguson stepped down in 1930, barely a year into the Great Depression, Henry succeeded him as Conservative Party leader and as Premier of Ontario. Henry continued his programme of building roads and extended Ontario's highway system from 670 kilometres (420 mi) to 3,888 kilometres (2,416 mi).

Construction of Canada's first four-lane controlled access superhighway, the Toronto to Niagara Falls Queen Elizabeth Way, was the most lasting achievement of the highway program.

Henry was opposed to government intervention to deal with the economy. Aside from building roads, his government did little to alleviate public suffering during the Great Depression, such as unemployment in the cities, or the collapse of prices for farm products in the country. Henry's government, like the federal government of RB Bennett, established work camps for jobless men. They were established not so much to provide social welfare but rather as social control: to evacuate the potentially radical element from the cities. The work camps also provided a source of labour for the construction of Henry's highway system.

In the 1934 election, Henry sought a new mandate from the voters in his first election as Premier. Some felt that the government had little to offer beyond more road construction, and the Tories were soundly defeated by the Ontario Liberal Party, led by Mitchell Hepburn. He became the Leader of the Opposition from 1934 to 1936, when he retired as the Conservative leader.

== Henry Farm ==
In 1898, Henry bought the farm house and property in which he would spend almost all of his adult life after he had graduated from the Ontario Agricultural College. The "Mulholland Homestead" had been settled by his great-grandfather Henry Mulholland, who sold it in the early 19th century.

The farm was located in what was then known as Todmorden, and contained 460 acres (190 ha). He sold it in 1958 for approximately CA$2 million to a British construction firm that was planning on building a housing division. He died ten days after he had completed the sale, on September 2, 1958. It became a suburban housing subdivision in the 1960s, Henry Farm, in City of North York, which is now part of the amalgamated City of Toronto.

A public high school near his former homestead was named after him, George S. Henry Academy.

Political offices
Preceded by Edward Arunah Dunlop	Treasurer of Ontario; 1934	Succeeded by Mitchell Hepburn
Preceded by W. E. N. Sinclair	Leader of the Opposition in the Ontario Legislature; 1935–1938	Succeeded by George Drew

Government offices
Preceded by Frank Campbell Biggs	Minister of Public Works and Highways and Minister of Highways; 1923–1930 and 1930–1931	Succeeded by Leopold Macaulay as Minister of Highways
