= Howard Ferguson =

Canadian politician (1870–1946)

The Honourable George Howard Ferguson PC
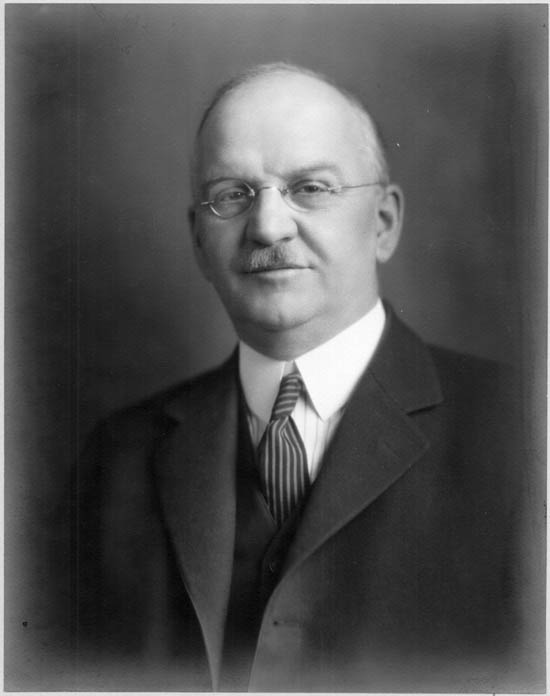
- The Hon. George Howard Ferguson

9th Premier of Ontario
- In office July 16, 1923 – December 15, 1930
- Monarch: George V
- Lieutenant Governor: Henry Cockshutt; William Donald Ross
- Preceded by: Ernest Charles Drury
- Succeeded by: George Stewart Henry

Canadian High Commissioner to the United Kingdom
- In office 1930–1935
- Prime Minister: R.B. Bennett, W.L. Mackenzie King
- Preceded by: Lucien Turcotte Pacaud (acting)
- Succeeded by: Vincent Massey

Ontario MPP
- In office January 25, 1905 – December 15, 1930
- Preceded by: Robert Joynt
- Succeeded by: James Alfred Sanderson
- Constituency: Grenville

Personal details
- Born: June 18, 1870 Kemptville, Ontario
- Died: February 21, 1946 (aged 75) Toronto, Ontario, Canada
- Resting place: Mount Pleasant Cemetery, Toronto
- Party: Conservative
- Spouse: Ella Cumming
- Education: University of Toronto; Osgoode Hall Law School

George Howard Ferguson PC (June 18, 1870 – February 21, 1946) was the ninth premier of Ontario, from 1923 to 1930. He was a Conservative member of the Legislative Assembly of Ontario from 1905 to 1930 who represented the eastern provincial riding of Grenville.

== Background ==
The son of Charles Frederick Ferguson, who served in the Canadian House of Commons, Ferguson studied at University College, University of Toronto and Osgoode Hall, was called to the Ontario bar in 1894 and returned to Kemptville to practise. Ferguson was elected to the municipal council and served three years as reeve of Kemptville. He married Ella Cumming in 1896.

== Early political career ==
First elected to the Legislative Assembly of Ontario in the 1905 election, Ferguson served as Minister of Lands, Forest, and Mines in the government of William Howard Hearst from 1914 to 1919. Ferguson approved the reservation of 5,000 square miles (12,950 km^{2}) of pulpwood on crown land to the Mead Corporation, and a further 1,500 square miles (3,885 km^{2}) to Abitibi Power and Paper Company although the Crown Timber Act required pulp limits to be sold by public tender. He declared, "My ambition has been to see the largest paper industry in the world established in the Province, and my attitude towards the pulp and paper industry has been directed towards assisting in bringing this about." After becoming Premier of Ontario in 1923, Ferguson reserved a further 3,000 square miles (7,770 km^{2}) to Abitibi.

In addition, he sold timber limits to the Shevlin-Clarke Lumber Company (headed by the fellow Conservative James Arthur Mathieu) for less than half the price they would have normally fetched, and the company later paid a fine of $1.5 million for breaching the Crown Timber Act. The transactions were criticized in a subsequent inquiry, in which the commission reported:

We are of the opinion that no officer, Minister or otherwise, should have the power to grant rights over large areas of the public domain at will without regard to Regulation; that power was never contemplated by the statutes; it does not at present exist, and should not be given to any individual. Such an arbitrary power subject to no control is obviously open to abuse.

Ferguson became leader of the Conservative Party upon the defeat of the Hearst government that year.

== Premiership ==
In the 1923 election, the Ontario Conservative Party came to power under Ferguson's leadership by defeating the United Farmers of Ontario-Labour coalition government of Ernest C. Drury. The Conservatives won 75 of the 111 seats in the legislature. Ferguson's government encouraged private investment in industry and the development of the province's natural resources as a means of achieving prosperity. It was re-elected in the 1926 election with 72 seats and in 1929 with 90 seats.

=== French policy ===
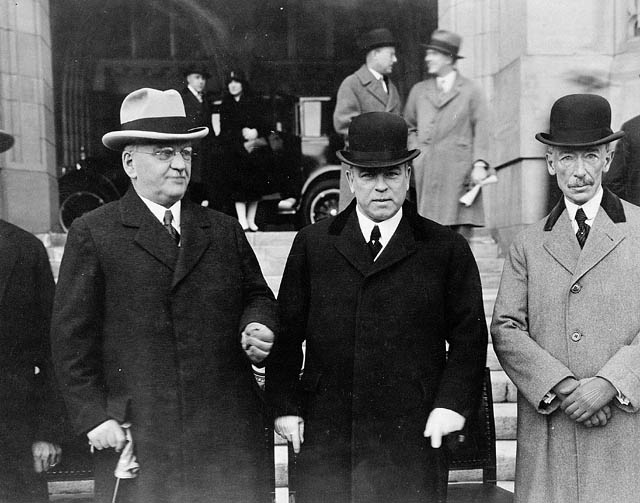
Ferguson (left) with Canadian prime minister William Lyon Mackenzie King (centre) and Quebec premier Louis-Alexandre Taschereau at the Dominion-Provincial Conference, November 23, 1927.

In 1911, Ferguson argued in the legislature that "no language other than English should be used as a medium of instruction in the schools of this Province" although that a significant proportion of the population was French-Canadian. Sectarian politics was still rife in Ontario, and the Conservatives relied on a base of Orange support. Ferguson was prepared to pander to the Orangemen with anti-Catholic and anti-French rhetoric.

In 1912, the Ontario government passed Regulation 17, which greatly restricted the use of French language instruction. The legislation outraged Quebec and was an irritant to national unity during the First World War. When Ferguson became premier, he reversed himself by moderating the legislation and allowing more French-language instruction. His government, however, refused to extend funding for the Catholic separate schools past Grade 8.

Ferguson's reversal on Regulation 17 was a concession needed for his alliance with Quebec Premier Louis-Alexandre Taschereau. Ferguson and Taschereau formed an axis against the federal government to demand more provincial rights and defend the provinces' ownership of natural resources such as water power (hydro-electric generation).

=== Liquor policy ===
The Ferguson government, eager for new tax revenue, held a plebiscite in 1924 to soften the province's temperance laws. A slim majority voted against prohibition, which led Ferguson's government to permit the sale of beer with an alcohol content of no more than 4.4 proof, about 2.2%. Such brew became known as Fergie's foam.

The 1926 provincial election was fought on the issue of the government's proposal to repeal the Ontario Temperance Act and to permit controlled sales of liquor in government-owned stores. Attorney-General William Folger Nickle, who had supported the government's earlier decision to allow the sale of low-alcohol beer, was opposed to going any further softening of temperance laws and resigned from Cabinet to run against the government as a Prohibitionist candidate against the repeal of the law. Ferguson's Conservatives were re-elected with a slightly reduced majority.

In 1927, the government introduced legislation to establish the Liquor Control Board of Ontario and to allow the sale of alcohol by government-owned and operated liquor stores. That moderate stance on temperance allowed the government to isolate the Liberals, who until 1930 took a hard prohibitionist stance by opposing even regulated liquor sales and so alienated all but the most hardline temperance advocates.

=== Other issues ===
The Tories remained hostile to labour and immigrants and were not prepared to provide social relief when the Great Depression threw thousands out of work and into poverty. The Ferguson government also opposed federal government plans for an old-age pension.

== Posthumous Honours ==
In September 1949, the Kemptville Nursery located in Ferguson's home town of Kemptville was renamed to the Ferguson Forest Center in honour of Ferguson.

== Later life ==
In December 1930, Ferguson left provincial politics to accept an appointment as Canadian High Commissioner in London. He was succeeded as party leader and premier by George Stewart Henry.

From 1945 to 1946, he served as Chancellor of the University of Western Ontario.

He also gave his name to the Ferguson Block, a government office building at Queen's Park in Toronto as well as the residence cafeteria at University College in the University of Toronto, which is called the Howard Ferguson Dining Hall. A University College scholarship is named after him.

Ferguson died on February 21, 1946, in Toronto.

Academic offices
Preceded by Henry Cockshutt	Chancellor of the University of Western Ontario; 1945–1946	Succeeded by Arthur R. Ford
Diplomatic posts
Preceded by Lucien Turcotte Pacaud, acting	Canadian High Commissioner to the United Kingdom; 1930–1935	Succeeded by Vincent Massey
