= Zachariah Adam Hall =

Canadian politician

Zachariah Adam (Z.A.) Hall

MPP for Waterloo South
- In office June 29, 1914 – September 23, 1919

Personal details
- Born: February 28, 1865 Millbank, Canada West
- Died: May 5, 1952 (aged 87) Guelph, Ontario
- Party: Progressive Conservative Party of Ontario
- Occupation: manufacturer, inventor and politician

Zachariah Adam Hall (February 28, 1865 – May 5, 1952) was an Ontario manufacturer and political figure. He represented Waterloo South in the Legislative Assembly of Ontario as a Conservative member from 1914 to 1919.

He was born in Millbank, Canada West, the son of Thomas Hall. He was educated in St. Marys, Strathroy and Guelph. In 1900, he married Margaret Forbes. Hall manufactured stoves and furnaces in Hespeler. He served as reeve for Preston in 1907. He was defeated in his bid for reelection in 1919 by Karl Homuth of the United Farmers of Ontario.

Hall was also an inventor, patenting a design for a brake for vehicle wheels, a hot air furnace, several designs for kitchen ranges and stoves and hockey sticks.

He died in Guelph on May 5, 1952, and was buried at Woodlawn Cemetery in that same city.
