= Isaac Clemens =

Canadian politician

Isaac Clemens (January 21, 1815 – September 24, 1880) was an Ontario farmer and political figure. He represented Waterloo South in the Legislative Assembly of Ontario as a Liberal member from 1867 to 1874.

He was born near Speedsville in Waterloo County in 1815, a descendant of Pennsylvania Dutch settlers. He served as reeve of Waterloo Township for 10 years and as county warden.

== Electoral history ==
1867 Ontario general election: Waterloo South
Party	Candidate	Votes	%
Liberal	Isaac Clemens	1,309	57.59
Conservative	J. Crombie	964	42.41
Total valid votes		2,273	81.59
Eligible voters		2,786	
Liberal pickup new district.			
Source: Elections Ontario

1871 Ontario general election: Waterloo South
Party	Candidate	Votes	%	±%
Liberal	Isaac Clemens	1,215	60.27	+2.68
Conservative	Mr. Erb	801	39.73	−2.68
Turnout		2,016	69.42	−12.17
Eligible voters		2,904		
Liberal hold		Swing		+2.68
Source: Elections Ontario
