= John Fleming (Canadian politician) =

Canadian politician

John Patrick Fleming (June 29, 1819 – January 21, 1877) was an Ontario businessman and political figure. He represented Waterloo South in the Legislative Assembly of Ontario as a Liberal member from 1875 to 1877.

Fleming was born in Dunfermline, Scotland in 1819 and grew up there, coming to Upper Canada around 1835 with his family. He worked for James Coleman at Dundas and then, in 1846, opened a grocery business in Galt with Andrew Elliott. After Elliott left the partnership, he took on William Robinson as a partner and added a distillery, soap factory and mills to the business. Fleming also opened a book and stationery store with Alexander Elmslie. In 1851, he married Mary Moir. He was president of the Gore District Fire Insurance and also served as town councillor and reeve for Galt. He was warden for Waterloo County in 1869. Fleming died in office in 1877 after suffering a stroke a few days earlier.

== Electoral history ==
1875 Ontario general election: Waterloo South
Party	Candidate	Votes
Liberal	John Fleming	Acclaimed
Source: Elections Ontario
