= Raymond Munro Myers =

Canadian politician (1894–1980)

Member of the Legislative Assembly of Ontario for Waterloo South
- In office 1951–1963
- Preceded by: Theodore Isley
- Succeeded by: Allan Reuter

Personal details
- Born: November 12, 1894 Victoria, British Columbia
- Died: April 14, 1980 (aged 85) Waterloo, Ontario
- Party: Progressive Conservative
- Profession: Lawyer

Raymond Munro Myers (November 12, 1894 – April 14, 1980) was a Canadian politician who was Progressive Conservative MPP for Waterloo South from 1951 to 1963.

== See also ==
- 24th Parliament of Ontario
- 25th Parliament of Ontario
- 26th Parliament of Ontario
