= Jessie Louise Beattie =

Canadian writer (1896–1985)

Jessie Louise Beattie (October 2, 1896 – October 5, 1985) was a Canadian writer.

Jessie Louise Beattie was born on October 2, 1896, in Blair, Ontario, to Francis Walker and Janet (Fleming) Beattie. She attended Galt Collegiate Institute, the University of Buffalo, and the University of Toronto.

Beattie wrote more than 20 books in various genres, including novels, poetry, biography, and an adventure story. Her novel Strength for the Bridge (1966) was the first novel written about Japanese Canadians in World War II.

She worked as a social worker and librarian in addition to her writing career.

She died on October 5, 1985, in Hamilton, Ontario.
