= James Young (Canadian politician) =

Canadian politician (1835–1913)

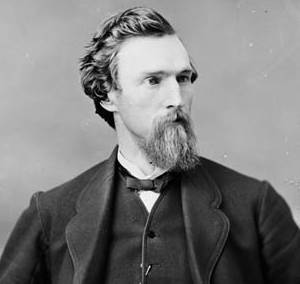

Ontario MPP
- In office 1879–1886
- Preceded by: Hugh Finlayson
- Succeeded by: William Bruce Wood
- Constituency: Brant North

Member of Parliament for Waterloo South
- In office 1867–1878
- Preceded by: Riding established
- Succeeded by: Samuel Merner

Personal details
- Born: May 24, 1835 Galt, Upper Canada
- Died: January 29, 1913 (aged 77) Galt, Ontario
- Party: Liberal
- Spouse: Margaret McNaught (m. 1858)
- Occupation: Businessman

James Young (May 24, 1835 – January 29, 1913) was an Ontario businessman, journalist and politician. He represented Waterloo South in the House of Commons of Canada as a Liberal member from 1867 to 1878.

== Biography ==
=== Early life ===
He was born in Galt in Upper Canada in 1835, the son of Scottish immigrants. He worked with a local newspaper and then bought several newspapers in the area in 1853 which he continued to publish until around 1863. He also wrote articles for other journals in the province. He became a partner in a wheel factory at Galt and also served on the town council.

=== Family ===
James Young married Margaret McNaught, daughter of John McNaught and his wife (née Kirkpatrick), on February 11, 1858. The couple resided at "Thornhill" in Galt, Ontario.

=== Politics ===
In 1867, he was elected to the 1st Canadian Parliament for Waterloo South as a member of the Liberal Party; he was reelected in 1872 and 1874.

In 1879, he was elected to represent Brant North in the Legislative Assembly of Ontario. He was appointed Treasurer and Commissioner of Agriculture in 1883, but resigned these posts later that year due to ill health. He opposed reciprocity in trade with the United States and supported an elected Senate.

=== Later life ===
After he retired from politics in 1886, he wrote a number of books dealing with Canadian history and politics, including Public men and public life in Canada, being recollections of parliament and the press, published in 1902. He died in Galt in 1913.

== Electoral history ==
=== Federal ===
1867 Canadian federal election: Waterloo South
Party	Candidate	Votes	%
Liberal	James Young	1,324	58.02
Unknown	James Cowan	958	41.98
Total valid votes		2,282	100.0
Source(s) "Waterloo South, Ontario (1867-1968)". History of Federal Ridings Since 1867. Library of Parliament.

1872 Canadian federal election: Waterloo South
Party	Candidate	Votes	%	±%
Liberal	James Young	acclaimed	–	–
Total valid votes		–	–	
Liberal hold		Swing		–
Source(s) "Waterloo South, Ontario (1867-1968)". History of Federal Ridings Since 1867. Library of Parliament.

1874 Canadian federal election: Waterloo South
Party	Candidate	Votes	%	±%
Liberal	James Young	acclaimed	–	–
Total valid votes		–	–	
Liberal hold		Swing		–
Source(s) "Waterloo South, Ontario (1867-1968)". History of Federal Ridings Since 1867. Library of Parliament.

1878 Canadian federal election: Waterloo South
Party	Candidate	Votes	%	±%
Conservative	Samuel Merner	1,468	50.76	–
Liberal	James Young	1,424	49.24	–
Total valid votes		2,892	100.0	
Conservative gain from Liberal		Swing		–
Source(s) "Waterloo South, Ontario (1867-1968)". History of Federal Ridings Since 1867. Library of Parliament.

=== Provincial ===
1879 Ontario general election: Brant North
Party	Candidate	Votes	%	±%
Liberal	James Young	990	60.37	+6.20
Conservative	Mr. Baird	650	39.63	−6.20
Total valid votes		1,640	66.80	+4.26
Eligible voters		2,455		
Liberal hold		Swing		+6.20
Source: Elections Ontario

== Works ==
- — (1880). Reminiscences of the Early History of Galt and the Settlement of Dumfries in the Province of Ontario. Toronto: Hunter, Rose and Company.
- — (1902). Public Men and Public Life in Canada. Toronto: William Briggs.
