= Bob Hodges =

Bob Hodges may refer to:

- Bob Hodges (ice hockey)
- Bob Hodges (speed skater)
