= Arthur White (Canadian politician) =

Canadian politician (1907–1973)

Member of Parliament for Waterloo South
- In office 1953–1957
- Preceded by: Howie Meeker
- Succeeded by: William Anderson

Personal details
- Born: October 10, 1907 East Zorra Township
- Died: July 9, 1973 (aged 65) Cambridge, Ontario
- Party: Liberal
- Spouse: Mary D. Rattray (m. 1938)
- Profession: lawyer

Arthur Walter Adams White (October 10, 1907 – July 9, 1973) was a Canadian lawyer and politician.

White was born in East Zorra Township to James and Floria White (née Adams). His parents had emigrated from England in 1903 and moved to Galt (now Cambridge, Ontario) in 1908, when Arthur was a year old. Arthur White attended the Galt Collegiate Institute and St. Michael's College School in Toronto. He went on to earn a B.A. from the University of Toronto and obtained a law degree from Osgoode Hall in 1938.

White established a legal practice in Galt in 1939, and became involved in civic life. In the 1953 federal election, he was elected under the Liberal Party of Canada banner to represent the riding of Waterloo South. Defeated in the 1957 election, he returned to Galt politics and as a member of the Parks Board campaigned fiercely for Galt's 1959 purchase of the farm which is now Churchill Park.

Arthur White Street in Cambridge, Ontario is named for him.

== Electoral record ==
1957 Canadian federal election: Waterloo South
Party	Candidate	Votes	%	±%
Progressive Conservative	William Anderson	11,699	47.38	+5.60
Liberal	Arthur White	7,450	30.17	-3.54
Co-operative Commonwealth	Theodore Isley	4,009	16.24	-2.39
Social Credit	George Hancock	1,532	6.20	+0.32
Total valid votes		24,690	100.0	
Progressive Conservative gain from Liberal		Swing		+4.57
Source(s) "Waterloo South, Ontario (1867-1968)". History of Federal Ridings Since 1867. Library of Parliament.

1953 Canadian federal election: Waterloo South
Party	Candidate	Votes	%	±%
Liberal	Arthur White	9,058	41.78	+11.18
Progressive Conservative	Robert Ross Barber	7,309	33.71	-8.53
Co-operative Commonwealth	Peggy Geens	4,039	18.63	-8.53
Social Credit	Jim Johannes	1,275	5.88	–
Total valid votes		21,681	100.0	
Liberal gain from Progressive Conservative		Swing		+9.86
Source(s) "Waterloo South, Ontario (1867-1968)". History of Federal Ridings Since 1867. Library of Parliament.
