= William Anderson (Ontario MP) =

Canadian politician and businessman

Member of Parliament for Waterloo South
- In office 1957–1961
- Preceded by: Arthur White
- Succeeded by: Gordon Chaplin

Personal details
- Born: August 31, 1905 Galt, Ontario, Canada
- Died: June 6, 1961 (aged 55) Ottawa, Ontario, Canada
- Party: Progressive Conservative
- Profession: businessman

William Anderson (August 31, 1905 – June 6, 1961) was a Canadian politician and businessman. He was elected to the House of Commons of Canada as a member of the Progressive Conservative Party representing the riding of Waterloo South in 1957 and re-elected in 1958.

The son of David Anderson, he was educated in Galt. In 1928, Anderson married Jean Elizabeth Wickens. He established Anderson's Tire Service in Galt. He also founded the William Anderson School for Retarded Children. Anderson served on Galt city council from 1938 to 1942 and from 1944 to 1949 and was mayor from 1954 to 1957. He died in office in Ottawa at the age of 55.

== Electoral record ==
1958 Canadian federal election: Waterloo South
Party	Candidate	Votes	%	±%
Progressive Conservative	William Anderson	15,624	60.48	+13.10
Liberal	Marjorie Oliver	5,793	22.43	-7.74
Co-operative Commonwealth	Theodore Isley	4,415	17.09	+0.85
Total valid votes		25,832	100.0	
Progressive Conservative hold		Swing		+10.42
Source(s) "Waterloo South, Ontario (1867-1968)". History of Federal Ridings Since 1867. Library of Parliament.

1957 Canadian federal election: Waterloo South
Party	Candidate	Votes	%	±%
Progressive Conservative	William Anderson	11,699	47.38	+5.60
Liberal	Arthur White	7,450	30.17	-3.54
Co-operative Commonwealth	Theodore Isley	4,009	16.24	-2.39
Social Credit	George Hancock	1,532	6.20	+0.32
Total valid votes		24,690	100.0	
Progressive Conservative gain from Liberal		Swing		+4.57
Source(s) "Waterloo South, Ontario (1867-1968)". History of Federal Ridings Since 1867. Library of Parliament.
