= William Elliott (Ontario politician) =

Canadian politician (1872–1944)

Member of Parliament for Waterloo South
- In office December 1921 – October 1925
- Preceded by: Frank Stewart Scott
- Succeeded by: Alexander Edwards

Personal details
- Born: 30 May 1872 Galt, Ontario, Canada
- Died: 12 December 1944 (aged 72) Galt, Ontario, Canada
- Party: Progressive
- Profession: farmer

William Elliott (30 May 1872 – 12 December 1944) was a Progressive Party member of the House of Commons of Canada. He was born in Galt, Ontario and became a farmer.

The son of Andrew Elliott and Mary Common, he was educated at Galt Collegiate and the Ontario Agricultural College. Elliott married Eva Croll.

Elliot served as a councillor for Waterloo County, Ontario and was reeve of North Dumfries Township.

He was elected to Parliament at the Waterloo South riding in the 1921 general election. After serving his only federal term, Elliot was defeated in the 1925 federal election by Alexander Edwards of the Conservative party.

== Electoral record ==
1925 Canadian federal election: Waterloo South
Party	Candidate	Votes	%	±%
Conservative	Alexander Edwards	8,089	61.06	+13.91
Progressive	William Elliott	5,158	38.94	-13.91
Total valid votes		13,247	100.0	
Conservative gain from Progressive		Swing		+13.91
Source(s) "Waterloo South, Ontario (1867-1968)". History of Federal Ridings Since 1867. Library of Parliament.

1921 Canadian federal election: Waterloo South
Party	Candidate	Votes	%	±%
Progressive	William Elliott	7,429	52.85	–
Conservative	Frank Stewart Scott	6,629	47.15	-9.83
Total valid votes		14,058	100.0	
Progressive gain		Swing		–
Source(s) "Waterloo South, Ontario (1867-1968)". History of Federal Ridings Since 1867. Library of Parliament.
