= Donald Shaver =

Donald McQueen Shaver
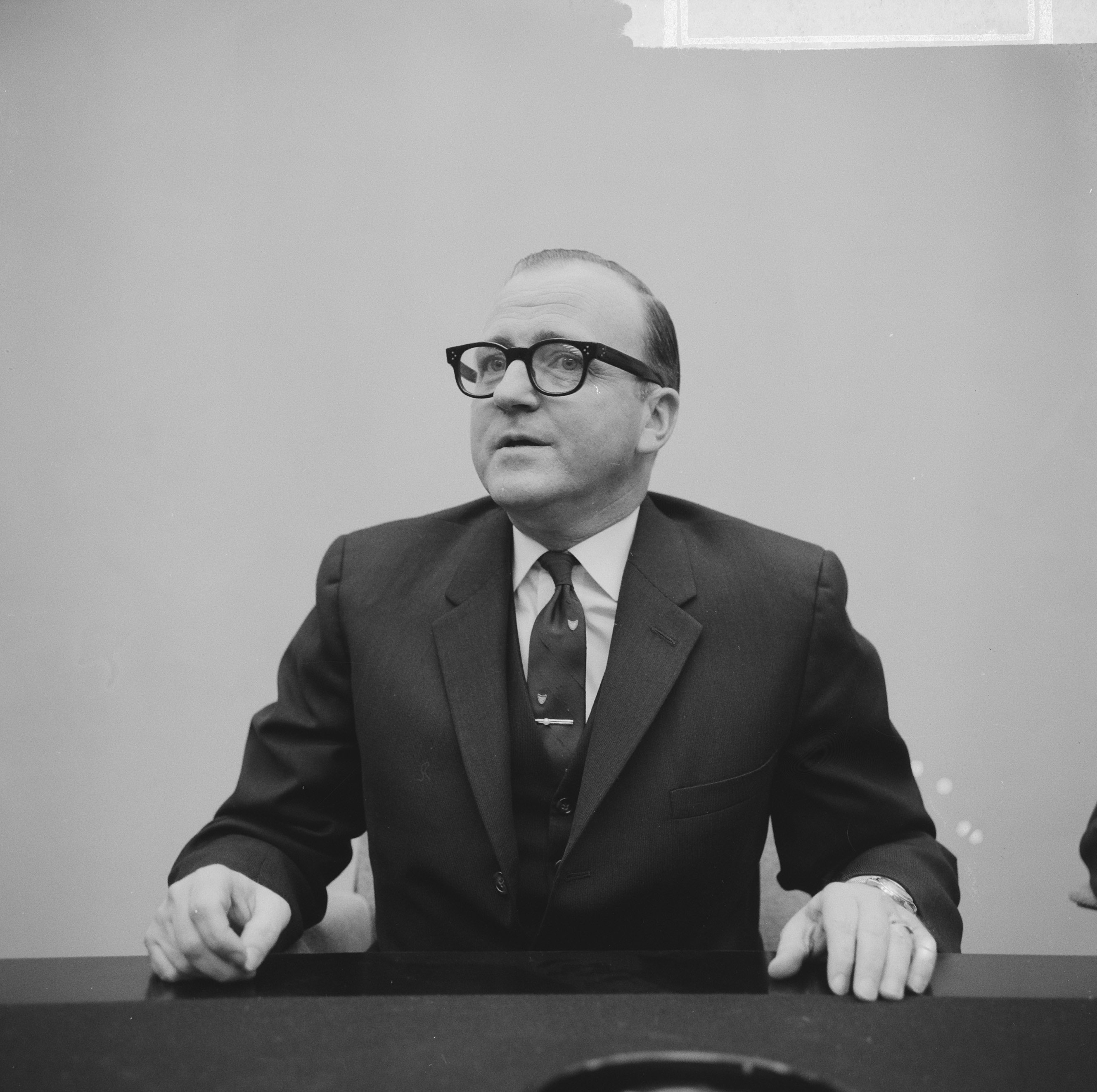
- Born: August 12, 1920; Galt Ontario (today part of Cambridge)
- Died: July 28, 2018 (aged 97)
- Occupations: Poultry breeder, businessman
- Years active: 1945–1985
- Known for: Shaver Starcross 288

Donald McQueen Shaver OC, (born August 12, 1920) was a Canadian pioneer in the poultry industry, who founded a breeding company that achieved worldwide prominence. At its peak Shaver Poultry Breeding Farms was the world's largest, being one of only two "world class foundation breeding" companies in Canada. Shaver died in 2018 of age related causes.

== Early life ==
Born in Galt Ontario (today part of Cambridge) he attended Galt Primary School and the Galt Collegiate Institute, graduating 1937. His mother's family was of Scottish descent, while his father's side was Hessian, settling in Canada around 1840. The family name was originally "schæfære" meaning shepherd.

He developed an interest in poultry when in 1932 he was given two hens by a great aunt. Young Don would travel by bicycle to attend poultry conferences given by Prof. W.R. Graham at OAC. His business was first named Grand Valley Hatchery after the local region in Ontario. By the mid '30s he was selling 2000 chickens a week. In 1935 his White Leghorns won a Canadian national 350-day egg-laying contest.

During World War II he volunteered for the army in 1941. He received officer training in Brockville, and after six months was shipped to England. He trained there with Fifth Armoured division, and was sent to Italy in late 1943 as a tank squadron commander. The division took part in the capture of Rimini and Ravenna in late 1944. The division was then transferred back to Western Europe. Shaver took also part in the liberation of the north of the Netherlands in 1945. Shaver rose in rank to Lieutenant Colonel, and remained in Europe until January 1946.

== Post-war success ==
During his war service, New York State College was caring for his breeding stock and hatching eggs, but the entire flock was consumed by fire in 1944. Returning home, Shaver would eventually regard this as a lucky break, as he was forced to search widely for diversified breeding stock. Local breeders, knowing his reputation were reluctant to sell to him for fear of competition. In 1946, there were 256 registered chicken breeders in Canada. Shaver Poultry became the 257th. By 1958, only Shaver remained, along with seven other major poultry breeders worldwide.

The principle of hybrid vigour had been well established for corn, but the costs and time required to test chicken crosses were higher. Small breeders (as Shaver was at the time) could not afford permanent scientific staff, so Shaver obtained assistance from geneticists conducting research at universities and government institutions. Shaver enjoyed good industrial infrastructure, with easy highway access to Toronto airport. The Ontario Agricultural College (now part of the University of Guelph) was only half an hour away, with the Poultry Department providing diagnostic work, nutrition and disease consultation. Agriculture Canada also provided valuable support.

In 1954, the Shaver "Starcross 288" was introduced, named for the number of eggs it laid in one of the initial tests, which surpassed other breeders. Part of the 288's initial success may have been due to its resistance to Marek's disease; as better vaccines became available, the 288 lost some of its advantages.

At the advice of C.D. Howe, Shaver expanded outside Canada in the late 1950s. Chile was the first international market, followed by the US, the UK, France and Germany. By 1957, Shaver had a Romanian operation, and in 1970 one in Ghana. At his retirement in 1985, his company was operating in 94 countries. In 1988, Shaver, by their own calculation had 33% of the world market for white egg laying hens and 25% for all egg layers.

Shaver launched a broiler product in 1958. In the early 1970s, the market share in the US was around 8–10%.

Cargill purchased part of Shaver in 1964. When Shaver retired in 1985, Cargill bought the rest of the company. Shaver was acquired by ISA in 1988, and then became part of Merial. The egg layer business kept the Shaver name, and was sold as Natexis Industrie in 2003, and then to Hendrix Genetics in 2005.

== Other pursuits ==
In 1962 Shaver ran unsuccessfully as a federal Liberal candidate.

After his retirement, Shaver took an interest in gene conservation. He maintained several pure lines of egg type poultry at his home farm near Cambridge. He later donated these flocks to the University of Guelph.

== Achievements and recognition ==
- Officer of the Order of Canada
- Waterloo Region Museum, Region Hall of Fame
- Cambridge Hall of Fame
- former Honorary Colonel of The Royal Highland Fusiliers of Canada
- received three Honorary Doctor of Sciences Degrees: McGill University in 1983, University of Guelph in 1995, University of Alberta 2007
- Director of the Cambridge Memorial Hospital
- Director of Gore Mutual Insurance Company
- sat on Board of Governors of the University of Guelph.
- volunteer chairman of the Developing Countries Farm Radio Network which broadcasts to 140 developing countries providing information on how to increase yields inexpensively.
- He received a Centennial Award from the Ontario Ministry of Agriculture in 1988
- Canadian Agricultural Hall of Fame and Ontario Agricultural Hall of Fame
- American Agricultural Hall of Fame in 1989.
- He is also a member of both the American Poultry and International Poultry Halls of Fame.
- provided funding for the Donald McQueen Shaver Poultry Complex on the Macdonald Campus of McGill University

== Electoral record ==
1963 Canadian federal election: Waterloo South
Party	Candidate	Votes	%	±%
Progressive Conservative	Gordon Chaplin	11,479	40.93	-1.38
Liberal	Donald Shaver	8,792	31.35	+1.81
New Democratic	Rod Stewart	7,403	26.40	+0.30
Social Credit	Ted Bezan	372	1.33	-0.73
Total valid votes		28,046	100.0	
Progressive Conservative hold		Swing		-1.60
Source(s) "Waterloo South, Ontario (1867-1968)". History of Federal Ridings Since 1867. Library of Parliament.

1962 Canadian federal election: Waterloo South
Party	Candidate	Votes	%	±%
Progressive Conservative	Gordon Chaplin	11,648	42.31	-18.17
Liberal	Donald Shaver	8,132	29.54	+7.11
New Democratic	Rod Stewart	7,186	26.10	+9.01
Social Credit	Peter Fast	566	2.06	–
Total valid votes		27,532	100.0	
Progressive Conservative hold		Swing		-12.64
Source(s) "Waterloo South, Ontario (1867-1968)". History of Federal Ridings Since 1867. Library of Parliament.
