= Fashion History Museum =

Museum in Ontario chronicling the history of fashion

Coordinates: 43°25′57″N 80°18′29″W

Fashion History Museum is a Canadian museum that had galleries located in Cambridge, Ontario, from 2015 to 2025. The FHM chronicles the history of fashion. It was founded in 2004 by Jonathan Walford and Kenn Norman. The museum is a non-profit charitable organization.

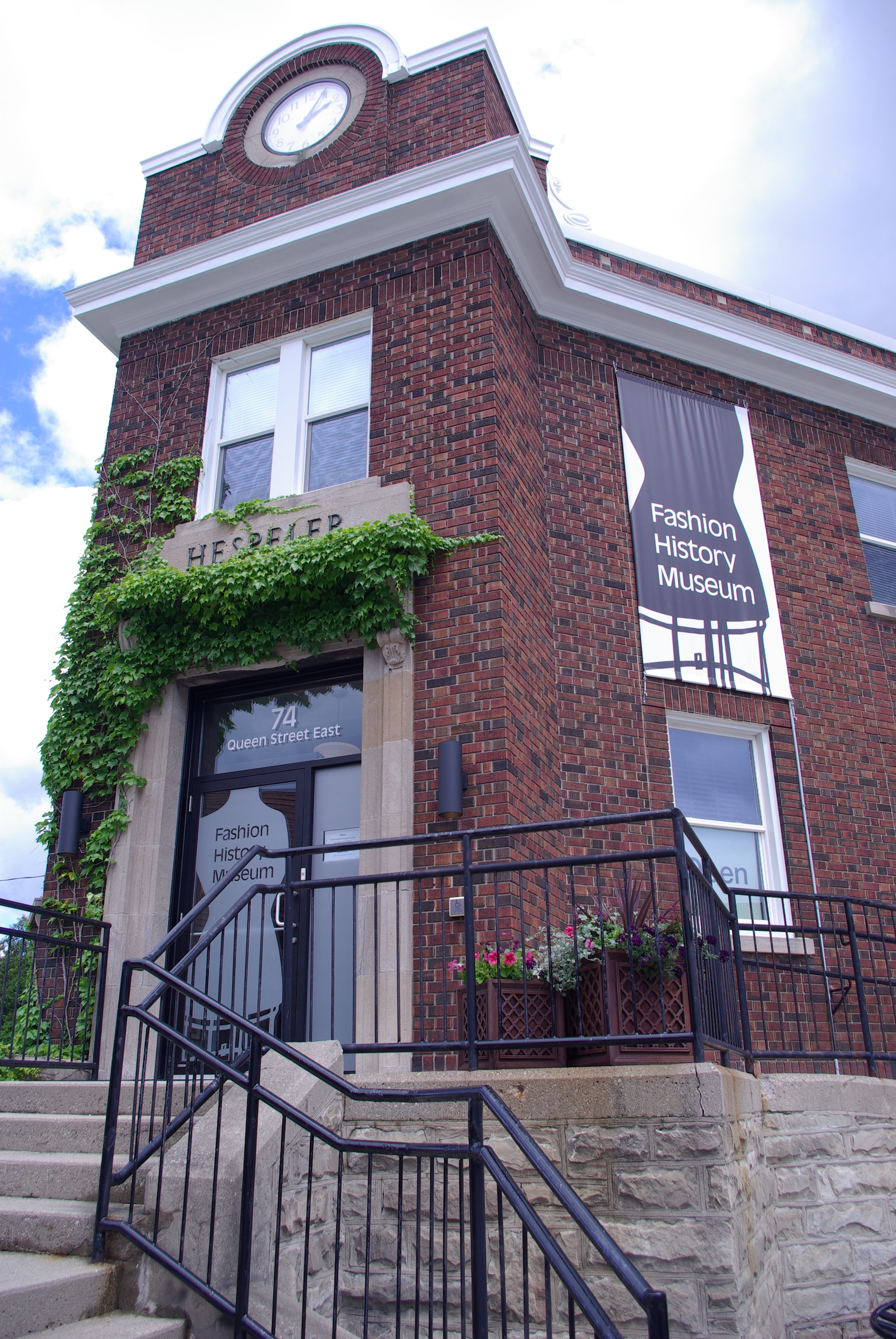
Fashion History Museum in the Old Hespeler Post Office

== History ==
=== Founders ===
Prior to founding the Fashion History Museum, Jonathan Walford had been the founding curator of the Bata Shoe Museum. Walford has been collecting historical fashions since the 1970s, finding pieces from auction houses, garage sales, and even rescuing some items from the trash. He has also written several books on fashion.

Walford is currently the museum's Curator. The museum's other founder, Kenn Norman, who serves as museum's Director, has a background in finance, project management and design.

=== Southworks Gallery ===
For the first ten years of its existence the museum lacked a permanent gallery, so it created exhibitions that travelled around Canada and the world, from Hong Kong to Bahrain. A pilot gallery in a mall in Cambridge Ontario, in 2013 saw almost 8000 visitors in the four and a half months the museum was open there.

=== Hespeler Post Office ===
In June 2015 the museum opened in a 3,000 square foot decommissioned post-office that had been opened in 1929 in the former town of Hespeler, now a neighbourhood of Cambridge. The museum retained and restored the original terrazzo floors and installed replicas of antique light fixtures for lighting. A restoration project for the clock over the museum's front doors was funded by the public. The town of Cambridge was once a textile manufacturing hub, making the museum a suitable fit with the town's history.

=== Closing Hespeler Site ===
After being defunded in 2023 by the City of Cambridge, the lease was terminated by the city in March 2025. The museum's collections were put in storage while the FHM looks for new premises.

== Collection ==
The museum's collection encompasses over 10,000 items. These items range from what may be the oldest existing European shoe worn in North America (it was reputedly worn in New Amsterdam and dates to about 1660), to dresses by Hollywood designer Adrian (Adolph Greenberg) to 1970s handbags made from cigarette packs.

== Exhibitions ==
Before establishing the current gallery space, the museum created travelling exhibitions and pop-up shows.

=== 2009 exhibitions ===
- Open Drawers (Collection highlights) - Guelph Civic Museum, August 15–30
- Talkin' Bout My Generation (1960s fashion) - Waterloo Region Children's Museum, June–September
- Everyday Wear (Daywear fashions 1820 - 1920) - Ball's Falls Centre for Conservation, November 2009 - January 2010

=== 2010 exhibitions ===
- The Towering Art of the Shoe (high heeled shoes 1780 - 1980) - New Town Plaza, Sha Tin, China, May 2010

=== 2011 exhibitions ===
- Nuclear Fashion (fashion advertising 1946 - 1964) - Waterloo City Museum, May–September
- Winter Sports (fashions for sport 1880 - 1930) - Ball's Falls Centre for Conservation, December

=== 2012 exhibitions ===
- 12.12.12 Life in Three Centuries - Guelph Museum, January 21 - March 10
- A Shoe Story (shoes 1780 - 1980) - Manama Mall, Bahrain, May 23 - June 16
- 12.12.12 Life in Three Centuries - Markham Museum, September 22 - April 30, 2013
- Nuclear Fashion (fashion advertising 1946 - 1964) - Burlington Museum, October - December
- Action! Sport, Film & Fashion - Grand River Film Festival, Cambridge, October 16–20

=== 2013 exhibitions ===
- Paisley and Plaid: Recurring Patterns in Fashion - Southworks, Cambridge, July 27 - November 30
- Fashion for the Future: Acquisitions from the new millennium - Southworks, Cambridge, July 27 - September 15
- It's in the Bag: An Anthology of Purse Styles - Southworks, Cambridge, July 27 - December 22
- Open Drawers: Recent acquisitions - Southworks, Cambridge, September 20 - December 22
- MODe: Fashions of the 1960s - Southworks, Cambridge, December 5–22

=== 2014 exhibitions ===
- Street Style: Fashions in Waterloo County 1853 - 1973 - Waterloo Region Museum, May 15 - January 10, 2015

=== 2015 exhibitions ===
The present gallery space opened June 27 with the following exhibitions:

- Treasures from the Collection
- Back to the Eighties
- What to do with an old post office?
- Punks and Posers: 1980s Portraits from New York and London

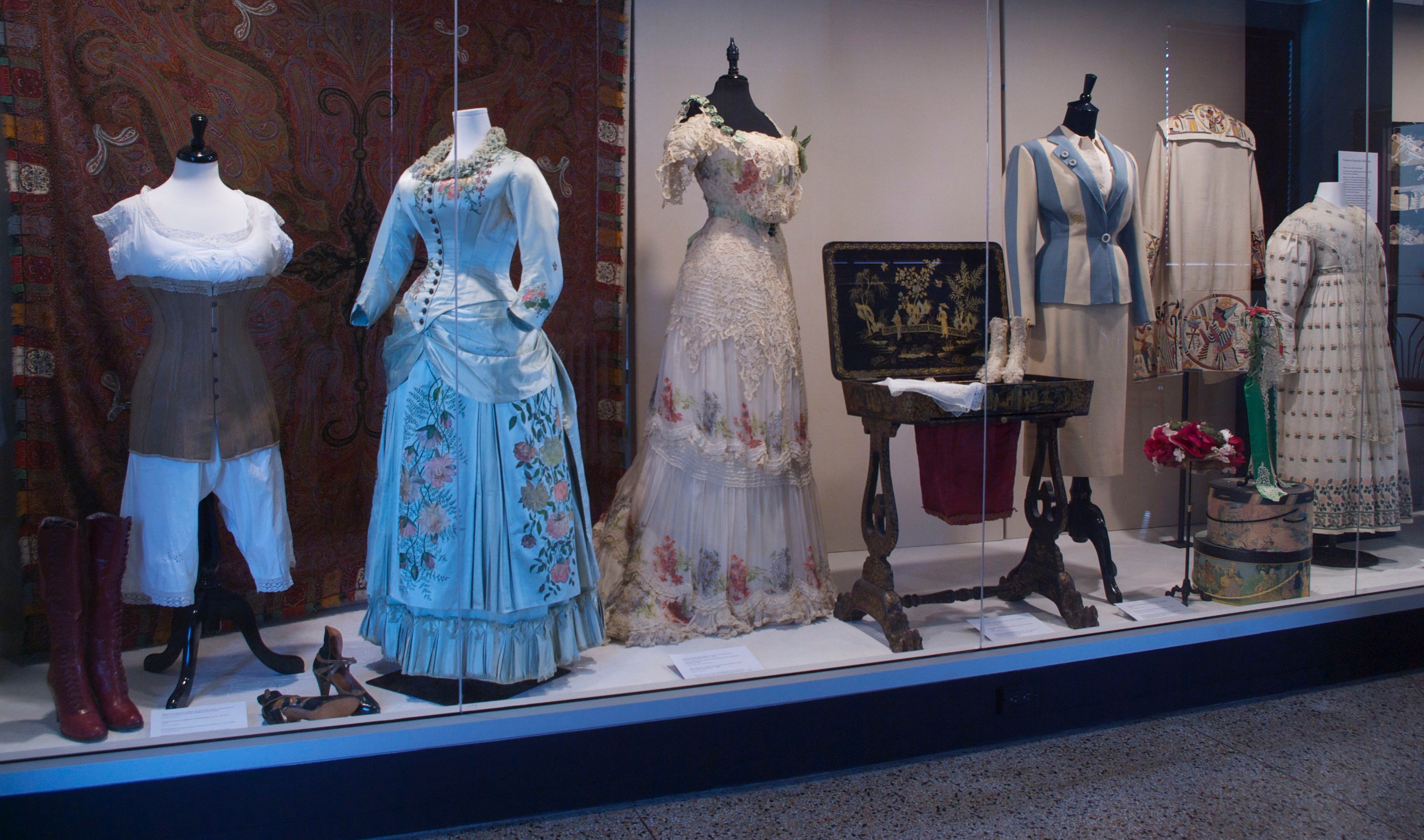
Image of the Treasures from the Collection exhibit

=== 2016 exhibitions ===
- To Meet the Queen: What to Wear in the Presence of Royalty
- A Canadian Fashion Story: Pat McDonagh 1967–2014
- Throw me something, Sister? Muses, Mardi Gras, and Glittered Shoes, curated by Angela Brayham
- Barbie's Boyfriend Ken: The Vintage Years 1961–1967, curated by James Fowler
- What I did on my Summer Vacation: Photographs by Walter Segers
- Tying the Knot: 200 Years of Wedding Attire
- Brides Revisited: Wedding Photography 1870–1970
- Wild and Rare: Fashion and Endangered Species, curated by Lisa Cox

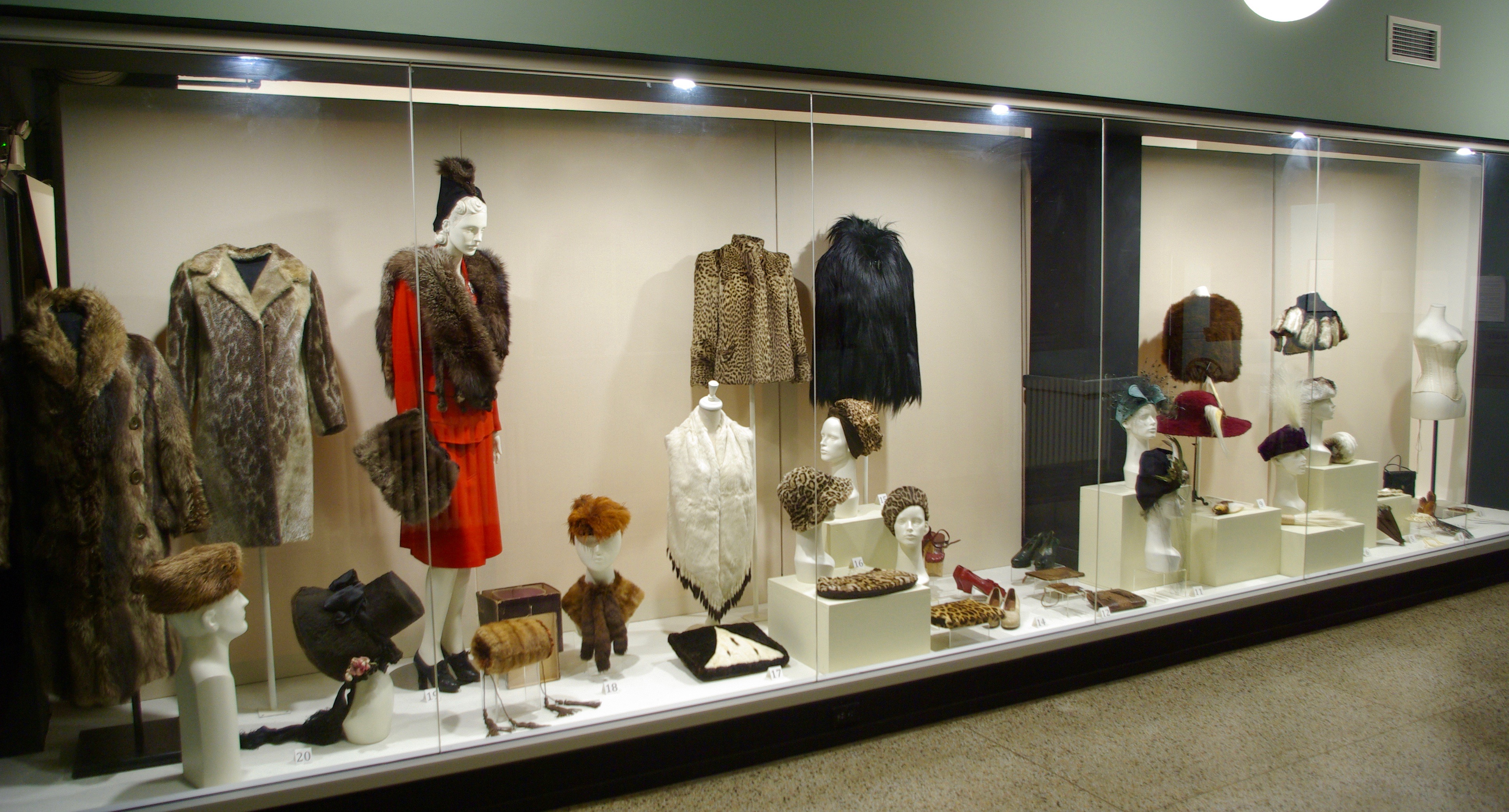
Image of the Wild and Rare exhibit

=== 2017 exhibitions ===
- Dior: 1947–1962 (March–July 2017)
- Fashioning Canada Since 1867 (March–December 2017)
- Jane Austen's World: 1792 - 1817 (July–December 2017)
- Then, Now, Next: Celebrating one hundred and fifty years of Canada’s contribution to the world of fashion (September 13–October 27, 2017)

=== 2018 exhibition ===
- 101 Tales of Fashion (March - December 2018)

=== 2019 exhibition ===
- Made in France (March - December 2019)

=== 2020/2021 exhibitions ===
- All exhibitions cancelled due to COVID, and instead, renovations were made to the gallery space

=== 2022 exhibitions ===
- Museum reopened briefly in December 2021 before closing again in January, and reopening February 23, 2022. Exhibitions include:
- 300 Years of Fashion - 40 Outfits Illustrating the History of Fashion 1720 - 2020
- Frock On - A Century of Teenage Fashion, Music, and Culture, 1920 - 2020
- Specs Appeal - A History of Eyewear (renamed from its original title 20/20 that was to debut in 2020)
- Portraits from Mali: Photographs by Malick Sidibe and Seydou Keïta 1951 - 1976

=== 2023 exhibitions ===
- Museum reopened March 15, 2024 and closed January 7, 2024, Exhibitions include:
- 300 Years of Fashion - 45 Outfits Illustrating the History of Fashion 1720 - 2020 (different from 2022 selection)
- The Bead Goes On: Bob Mackie Gowns for Cher
- Wearing Waterloo: Local Fashions from the Waterloo Region
- Coronation Celebration: Commemorative Scarves & Handkerchiefs Portraits

=== 2024 exhibitions ===
- Museum reopened March 30 2024 and closed March 16, 2025. Exhibitions include:
- 300 Years of Fashion - 46 Outfits Illustrating the History of Fashion 1720 - 2020 (different selection from 2023)
- Only Fans - 250 Years of Unfolding Beauty
- Hat-ology: A Lexicon of Hat Styles
- Nuclear Fashion: Advertising Fashion during the Baby Boom
