= Leonard Grieve Robinson =

Canadian politician and businessman

Leonard Grieve Robinson (September 29, 1908 – October 30, 1980) was a Canadian lawyer, businessman, and political figure in Ontario. He represented Waterloo South in the Legislative Assembly of Ontario from 1943 to 1945 as a Co-operative Commonwealth member.

He was born in Regina, Saskatchewan, the son of John Acton Leonard Robinson and Blanche Grieve, and was educated in Napanee, Regina, Calgary, Ottawa and at Toronto University. He began practicing law in 1952.

In 1937, Robinson married Isabelle Mary Bate, with whom he had two sons. He was owner of the Grieve Robinson Co. Robinson lived in Galt for many years but practised law in Wasaga Beach the last 13 years of his life. He died at Collingwood General and Marine Hospital in Collingwood, Ontario.
