= George Adam Clare =

Canadian politician (1854–1915)

The Honourable George Adam Clare PC
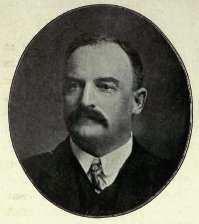

Member of the Canadian Parliament for Waterloo South
- In office 1900–1915
- Preceded by: James Livingston
- Succeeded by: Frank Stewart Scott

Personal details
- Born: June 6, 1854 Preston, Canada West
- Died: January 9, 1915 (aged 60)
- Party: Conservative

George Adam Clare, PC (June 6, 1854 – January 9, 1915) was a businessman, manufacturer and politician based in Preston, Ontario, Canada (now part of Cambridge, Ontario).

He was born in Preston to John Clare and Margaret Beck. In 1875, he went to work at his father's foundry eventually purchasing the enterprise in partnership with his brother and another associate upon his father's retirement in 1881. The business was incorporated in 1901 as Clare Bros. Co. Ltd., with George Clare as its president.

In 1876, he married Catherine Fink.

Clare also headed a number of other companies such as Galt Stove and Furnace, Clare and Clare and Brodest Ltd. of Winnipeg, Solid Leather Shoe Co. Ltd, Preston Car and Coach Co. and Canadian Office and School Furniture Co. Ltd.

Clare was elected to the Preston town council in 1883 and became reeve of Preston in 1886 serving for two years. He assumed this position again from 1891 to 1898.

When Preston was incorporated as a town in 1900 he became its first mayor. He also served as warden of Waterloo County in 1895.

Clare was also active in federal politics running as the Conservative Party's candidate in Waterloo South on several occasions. He was defeated by James Livingston in the 1891 and 1896 federal elections before winning a seat in the House of Commons of Canada in the 1900 election. He served as a Member of Parliament until his death in 1915 and was named to the Queen's Privy Council of Canada in 1913, a rare honour for someone not in Cabinet. Clare died in Preston.

He was inducted to the City of Cambridge Hall of Fame in 2005.

== Electoral record ==
1911 Canadian federal election: Waterloo South
Party	Candidate	Votes	%	±%
Conservative	George Adam Clare	3,492	56.96	+5.24
Liberal	Sylvester Moyer	2,639	43.04	-5.24
Total valid votes		6,131	100.0	
Conservative hold		Swing		+5.24
Source(s) "Waterloo South, Ontario (1867-1968)". History of Federal Ridings Since 1867. Library of Parliament.

1908 Canadian federal election: Waterloo South
Party	Candidate	Votes	%	±%
Conservative	George Adam Clare	3,015	51.72	-1.79
Liberal	Sylvester Moyer	2,815	48.28	+1.79
Total valid votes		5,830	100.0	
Conservative hold		Swing		-1.79
Source(s) "Waterloo South, Ontario (1867-1968)". History of Federal Ridings Since 1867. Library of Parliament.

1904 Canadian federal election: Waterloo South
Party	Candidate	Votes	%	±%
Conservative	George Adam Clare	2,785	53.51	+1.41
Liberal	George Laird	2,420	46.49	+1.41
Total valid votes		5,205	100.0	
Conservative hold		Swing		+1.41
Source(s) "Waterloo South, Ontario (1867-1968)". History of Federal Ridings Since 1867. Library of Parliament.

1900 Canadian federal election: Waterloo South
Party	Candidate	Votes	%	±%
Conservative	George Adam Clare	2,708	52.10	+1.21
Liberal	Peter Shantz	2,490	47.90	-1.21
Total valid votes		5,198	100.0	
Conservative gain from Liberal		Swing		+1.21
Source(s) "Waterloo South, Ontario (1867-1968)". History of Federal Ridings Since 1867. Library of Parliament.

1896 Canadian federal election: Waterloo South
Party	Candidate	Votes	%	±%
Liberal	James Livingston	2,543	50.89	-2.87
Conservative	George Adam Clare	2,454	49.11	+2.87
Total valid votes		4,144	100.0	
Liberal hold		Swing		-2.87
Source(s) "Waterloo South, Ontario (1867-1968)". History of Federal Ridings Since 1867. Library of Parliament.

1891 Canadian federal election: Waterloo South
Party	Candidate	Votes	%	±%
Liberal	James Livingston	2,228	53.76	-0.68
Conservative	George Adam Clare	1,916	46.24	+0.68
Total valid votes		4,144	100.0	
Liberal hold		Swing		-0.68
Source(s) "Waterloo South, Ontario (1867-1968)". History of Federal Ridings Since 1867. Library of Parliament.
