= Samuel Merner =

Canadian politician (1823–1908)

The Honourable Samuel Merner
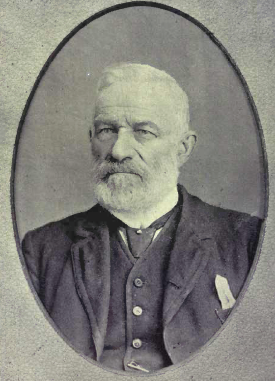

Member of Parliament for Waterloo South
- In office 1878–1882
- Preceded by: James Young
- Succeeded by: James Livingston

Canadian Senator from Ontario
- In office 1887–1908
- Appointed by: John A. Macdonald

Personal details
- Born: 9 January 1823 Kien, Canton of Bern, Switzerland
- Died: 11 August 1908 (aged 85) Kitchener, Ontario, Canada
- Party: Conservative

Samuel Merner (9 January 1823 – 11 August 1908) was a Canadian businessman and politician.

== Background ==
Born in Kien, Canton of Bern, Switzerland, with the last name of Muerner or Mürner, he immigrated to Canada with his parents in 1837 settling in Waterloo County, Ontario. He later anglicized his last name to Merner.

A businessman, his career in politics started in 1857 when he became a member of the council of the village of New Hamburg, Ontario. From 1873 to 1878, he was reeve of New Hamburg and served as Warden of Waterloo County in 1878. After losing a by-election in 1878 in the Ontario provincial riding of Waterloo South, he was elected to the House of Commons of Canada in the federal riding of Waterloo South in the 1878 federal election. A Conservative, he was defeated in the 1882 election but was appointed to the Senate in 1887 representing the senatorial division of Hamburg, Ontario. He served until his death in 1908.

== Electoral record ==
1882 Canadian federal election: Waterloo South
Party	Candidate	Votes	%	±%
Liberal	James Livingston	1,580	53.52	+4.28
Conservative	Samuel Merner	1,372	46.48	-4.28
Total valid votes		2,952	100.0	
Liberal gain from Conservative		Swing		+4.28
Source(s) "Waterloo South, Ontario (1867-1968)". History of Federal Ridings Since 1867. Library of Parliament.

1878 Canadian federal election: Waterloo South
Party	Candidate	Votes	%	±%
Conservative	Samuel Merner	1,468	50.76	–
Liberal	James Young	1,424	49.24	–
Total valid votes		2,892	100.0	
Conservative gain from Liberal		Swing		–
Source(s) "Waterloo South, Ontario (1867-1968)". History of Federal Ridings Since 1867. Library of Parliament.
