= Alexander Edwards (politician) =

Canadian businessman and politician

Member of Parliament for Waterloo South
- In office October 1925 – June 1938
- Preceded by: William Elliott
- Succeeded by: Karl Kenneth Homuth

Personal details
- Born: Alexander McKay Edwards; 7 April 1876 Bothwell, Ontario, Canada
- Died: 3 June 1938 (aged 62)
- Party: Conservative (1867–1942)
- Spouse(s): Laura Clare m. 26 April 1905
- Profession: manufacturer, pharmacist

Alexander McKay Edwards (7 April 1876 – 3 June 1938) was a Canadian businessman and politician. Edwards was a Conservative member of the House of Commons of Canada. He was born in Bothwell, Ontario and became a manufacturer and pharmacist.

The son of Charles Edwards and Annie McKay, Edwards attended the Ontario College of Pharmacy. Besides his work as a pharmacist, he also was president of Galt Stove and Furnace. In 1905, he married Laura Clare.

He was an alderman for Galt for eight years, and mayor of the municipality in 1916 and 1917.

Edwards was first elected to Parliament at the Waterloo South riding in the 1925 general election then re-elected in 1926, 1930 and 1935. Edwards died at his residence in Galt on 3 June 1938 from a heart attack before he had completed his term in the 18th Canadian Parliament. He was survived by his wife, a son and a daughter.

== Electoral record ==
1935 Canadian federal election: Waterloo South
Party	Candidate	Votes	%	±%
Conservative	Alexander Edwards	6,731	40.15	-24.36
Liberal	David S. Charlton	6,606	39.41	+3.92
Co-operative Commonwealth	Felix Lazarus	2,426	14.47	–
Reconstruction	Harvey Orton Hawke	1,000	5.97	–
Total valid votes		16,763	100.0	
Conservative hold		Swing		-14.14
Source(s) "Waterloo South, Ontario (1867-1968)". History of Federal Ridings Since 1867. Library of Parliament.

1930 Canadian federal election: Waterloo South
Party	Candidate	Votes	%	±%
Conservative	Alexander Edwards	8,999	64.51	+5.11
Liberal	Charles Widdifield	4,950	35.49	-5.11
Total valid votes		13,949	100.0	
Conservative hold		Swing		+5.11
Source(s) "Waterloo South, Ontario (1867-1968)". History of Federal Ridings Since 1867. Library of Parliament. Archived from the original on 21 July 2015.

1926 Canadian federal election: Waterloo South
Party	Candidate	Votes	%	±%
Conservative	Alexander Edwards	7,220	59.40	-1.66
Liberal	Charles Widdifield	4,935	40.60	–
Total valid votes		12,155	100.0	
Conservative hold		Swing		–
Source(s) "Waterloo South, Ontario (1867-1968)". History of Federal Ridings Since 1867. Library of Parliament.

1925 Canadian federal election: Waterloo South
Party	Candidate	Votes	%	±%
Conservative	Alexander Edwards	8,089	61.06	+13.91
Progressive	William Elliott	5,158	38.94	-13.91
Total valid votes		13,247	100.0	
Conservative gain from Progressive		Swing		+13.91
Source(s) "Waterloo South, Ontario (1867-1968)". History of Federal Ridings Since 1867. Library of Parliament.
