= William Tassie (teacher) =

Irish-Canadian educator (1815–1886)

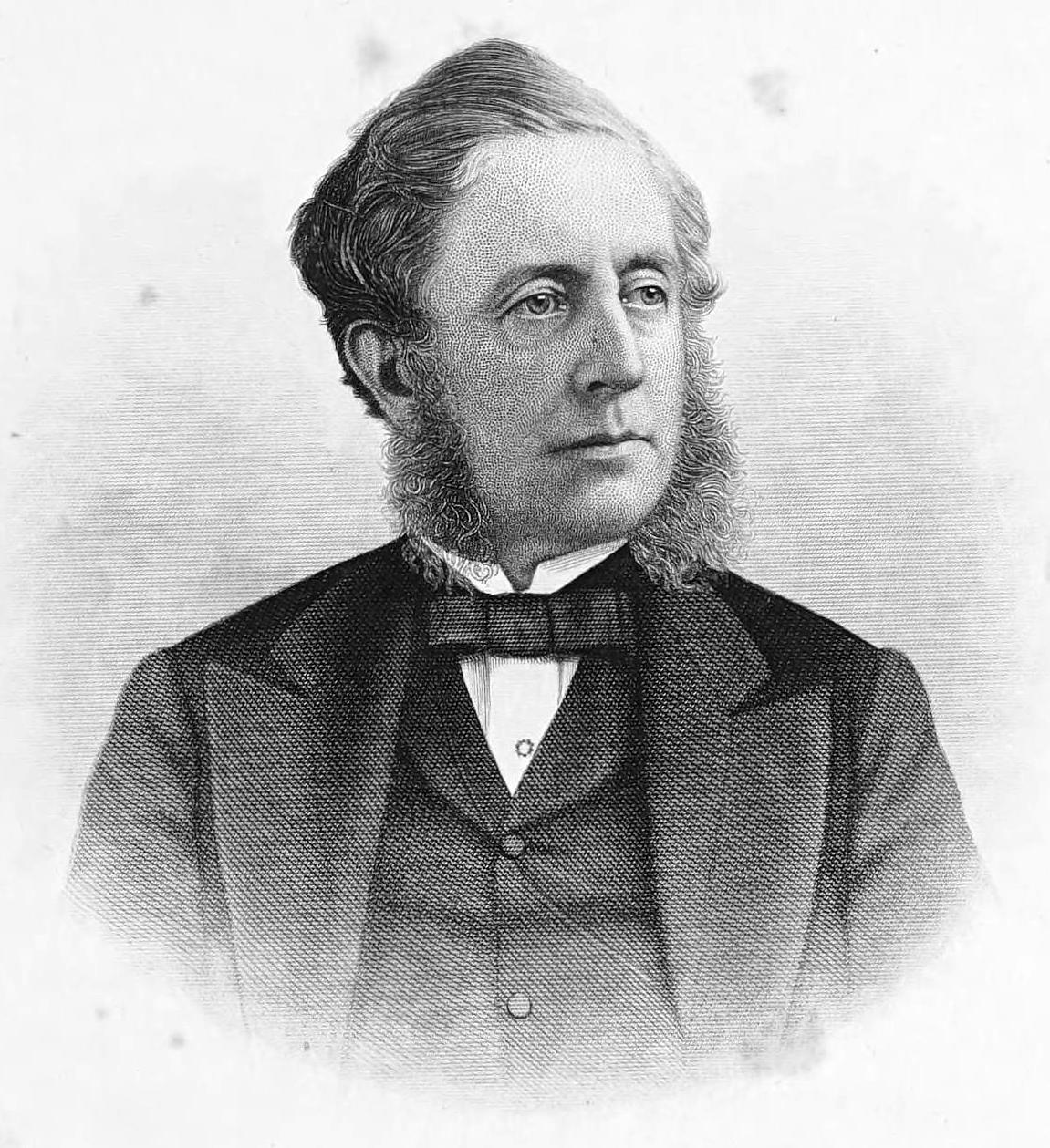
- Tassie in an 1880 engraving
- Born: May 10, 1815; Dublin, Ireland
- Died: November 21, 1886 (aged 71); Peterborough, Ontario, Canada
- Occupation: Educator
- Known for: Founder, Galt Grammar School

William Tassie (10 May 1815 – 21 November 1886) was an Irish-Canadian educator. In 1851, he founded the Galt Grammar School and served as its headmaster until 1881. He later became the principal at Peterborough Collegiate Institute. Tassie was opposed to efforts in Upper Canada to reform the education system to focus on practical education, and was an advocate of a classical education.

== Early life and education ==
Tassie was born on 10 March 1815 in Dublin, Ireland. He was the third child of Mary (née Stewart) and James Tassie. He had seven brothers and sisters. In 1834 Tassie and his wife moved with the rest of his family to Nelson Township in Upper Canada. In 1856 he was awarded a Bachelor of Arts from the University of Toronto, and in 1858 he received a Master of Arts from the same institution.

== Career ==
In 1851, Tassie founded the Galt Grammar School, which became a prominent school in Canada that attracted students from both Canada and the United States. Tassie supported classical education, and was opposed to coeducation. In the 1870s, Tassie was criticized for his refusal to adapt to provincial standards that emphasized practical education over a classical one when his students began to perform poorly on their provincial examinations. He attempted to convince Egerton Ryerson in 1871 to allow him to continue to hold the then illegal preparatory classes. He argued that with private schools available, parents could choose to withdraw their children if they did not have the opportunity to learn Latin early. In a radio broadcast, Henry John Cody commended Tassie as an effective teacher of the classics but questioned his reluctance to adopt newer teaching methodologies. Cody noted:

"But he wrought a great work in his generation. His personality created in a famous school an atmosphere of loyalty to the institution, which fostered all the higher loyalties of life, and he sent forth into the broad fields of the Dominion hundreds of youth imbued with fine ideals of sincerity, thoroughness, perseverance, and public service. This is no mean legacy to leave to any people in any age".

In spring 1881 Tassie resigned as headmaster of Galt after facing criticism for refusing to change his educational methods. In fall 1881 he founded a new boarding school in Yorkville that also followed a classical education model. In 1884 he was hired as the headmaster at Peterborough Collegiate Institute. He again refused to update his teaching philosophy, but was hired with the intent of improving the discipline at the school.

From 1869 to 1870 Tassie was the head of the Ontario Grammar School Teachers' Association, and in 1871 he continued to serve in that capacity after it transformed into the Ontario Grammar School Masters' Association. Queen's College granted Tassie an honorary Legum Doctor in 1871.

== Personal life ==
Tassie married Sarah Morgan in Dublin in 1834. The couple was childless.

Tassie died of a stroke on 21 November 1886 in Peterborough, Ontario.
