= Gordon Chaplin =

Canadian politician

Member of Parliament for Waterloo South
- In office June 1962 – June 1964
- Preceded by: William Anderson
- Succeeded by: Max Saltsman

Personal details
- Born: 31 July 1907 St. Catharines, Ontario
- Died: 27 June 1964 (aged 56) Galt, Ontario
- Party: Progressive Conservative
- Spouse: Helen Elizabeth Goring
- Profession: Businessman, manufacturer

Gordon Chaplin (31 July 1907 – 27 June 1964) was a Progressive Conservative party member of the House of Commons of Canada. He was born in St. Catharines, Ontario and became a businessman and manufacturer by career.

The son of James Dew Chaplin and Edna Elizabeth Burgess, he was educated in St. Catharines and established himself in business in Galt. Chaplin was president of Canadian General Tower Limited and a director of the Waterloo Savings and Trust Company. In 1920, he married Helen Elizabeth Goring.

Chaplin represented Waterloo South in the Legislative Assembly of Ontario from 1945 to 1948; he was defeated when he ran for reelection in 1948. He was first elected to the House of Commons for the Waterloo South riding in the 1962 general election and re-elected there in 1963. Chaplin died in office on 27 June 1964 during his term in the 26th Canadian Parliament.

His uncle Alexander Dew Chaplin also served in the House of Commons.

Gordon Chaplin Park in Cambridge, Ontario is named in his honour.

== Electoral record ==
1963 Canadian federal election: Waterloo South
Party	Candidate	Votes	%	±%
Progressive Conservative	Gordon Chaplin	11,479	40.93	-1.38
Liberal	Donald Shaver	8,792	31.35	+1.81
New Democratic	Rod Stewart	7,403	26.40	+0.30
Social Credit	Ted Bezan	372	1.33	-0.73
Total valid votes		28,046	100.0	
Progressive Conservative hold		Swing		-1.60
Source(s) "Waterloo South, Ontario (1867-1968)". History of Federal Ridings Since 1867. Library of Parliament.

1962 Canadian federal election: Waterloo South
Party	Candidate	Votes	%	±%
Progressive Conservative	Gordon Chaplin	11,648	42.31	-18.17
Liberal	Donald Shaver	8,132	29.54	+7.11
New Democratic	Rod Stewart	7,186	26.10	+9.01
Social Credit	Peter Fast	566	2.06	–
Total valid votes		27,532	100.0	
Progressive Conservative hold		Swing		-12.64
Source(s) "Waterloo South, Ontario (1867-1968)". History of Federal Ridings Since 1867. Library of Parliament.
