= Allan Reuter =

Canadian politician (1914–1982)

Allan Edward Reuter

Member of the Legislative Assembly of Ontario for Waterloo South
- In office 1963–1975
- Preceded by: Raymond Munro Myers
- Succeeded by: Riding abolished

28th Speaker of the Legislative Assembly of Ontario
- In office 1971–1974
- Preceded by: Frederick Cass
- Succeeded by: Russell Rowe

Personal details
- Born: August 9, 1914 Preston, Ontario
- Died: December 31, 1982 (aged 68)
- Party: Progressive Conservative

Allan Edward Reuter (August 9, 1914 – December 31, 1982) was a Canadian politician and Speaker of the Legislative Assembly of Ontario in the 1970s.

The eldest of six children, Reuter was born in Preston, Ontario. His father, Stanley was a wood pattern maker. Reuter dropped out of high school at the age of sixteen in order to help support his family by taking a job as an office boy at the Savage Shoe Company. He was office manager when he joined the Royal Canadian Naval Volunteer Reserve in 1943. Discharged from the service at the end of World War II he opened a practice as an accountant and trustee-in-bankruptcy.

Reuter was elected to the Preston town council in 1959 but resigned in 1961 in protest of the method in which the reeve was chosen. He returned in 1962 as mayor and then ran for and was elected to the Legislative Assembly of Ontario as the Progressive Conservative MPP for Waterloo South in the 1963 provincial election and was re-elected in 1967 and 1971.

Premier John Robarts appointed Reuter as Deputy Speaker and Chairman of the Committee of the Whole House in 1968. In 1971, he was appointed Speaker by Premier Bill Davis. He resigned as Speaker in October 1974 due to poor health and did not run in the 1975 provincial election.

In 1997, he was named to the Cambridge Hall of Fame.

He died in Cambridge Memorial Hospital at the age of 68.
