= Frank Stewart Scott =

Canadian politician

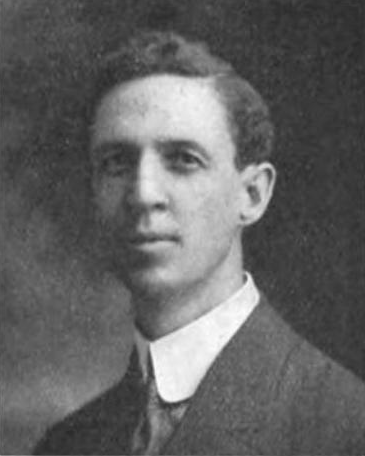

Member of the Canadian Parliament for Waterloo South
- In office 1915–1921
- Preceded by: George Adam Clare
- Succeeded by: William Elliott

Personal details
- Born: August 23, 1879 Galt, Ontario, Canada
- Died: February 13, 1943 (aged 63) Galt, Ontario, Canada
- Party: Conservative

Frank Stewart Scott (August 23, 1879 – February 13, 1943) was a Canadian shoe manufacturer and politician.

Born in Galt, Ontario, the son of Frank A. Scott and Mary Stewart, Scott graduated from the Galt Collegiate Institute. In 1897, he started working for the Galt Knitting Company. In 1899, he started a shoe manufacturing company with a partner, Edwin J. Getty. In 1906 the company, Getty & Scott Shoe Co. Ltd, was incorporated. In 1912, Scott became the sole owner and renamed the firm, Scott Shoe Company. In 1904, he married Minnie L. Weir.

From 1907 to 1908, he was a member of the Galt municipal council. He was reeve from 1909 to 1911 and mayor from 1912 to 1913. From 1908 to 1911, he was a member of the Waterloo County council and was reeve of Waterloo County from 1910 to 1911.

He was elected to the House of Commons of Canada for the electoral district of Waterloo South in a 1915 by-election called after the death of George Adam Clare. A Conservative, he was re-elected in the 1917 election. he was defeated in the 1921 election. Scott died in Galt at the age of 63.

== Electoral record ==
1921 Canadian federal election: Waterloo South
Party	Candidate	Votes	%	±%
Progressive	William Elliott	7,429	52.85	–
Conservative	Frank Stewart Scott	6,629	47.15	-9.83
Total valid votes		14,058	100.0	
Progressive gain		Swing		–
Source(s) "Waterloo South, Ontario (1867-1968)". History of Federal Ridings Since 1867. Library of Parliament.

1917 Canadian federal election: Waterloo South
Party	Candidate	Votes	%	±%
Government (Unionist)	Frank Stewart Scott	5,681	56.98	–
Opposition (Laurier Liberals)	Adam Thomson	2,894	29.02	–
Labour	Thomas Hall	1,396	14.00	–
Total valid votes		9,971	100.0	
Government (Unionist) hold		Swing		–
Source(s) "Waterloo South, Ontario (1867-1968)". History of Federal Ridings Since 1867. Library of Parliament.

Canadian federal by-election, February 1, 1915: Waterloo South Death of George Adam Clare
Party	Candidate	Votes	%	±%
Conservative	Frank Stewart Scott	acclaimed	–	–
Total valid votes		–	–	
Conservative hold		Swing		–
Source(s) "Waterloo South, Ontario (1867-1968)". History of Federal Ridings Since 1867. Library of Parliament.
