= Waterloo South (provincial electoral district) =

Former provincial electoral district in Ontario, Canada

Ontario electoral district

Defunct provincial electoral district
- Legislature: Legislative Assembly of Ontario
- District created: 1867
- District abolished: 1975
- First contested: 1867
- Last contested: 1971

Waterloo South was a provincial electoral district in Ontario, Canada. It was created in 1867 at the time of confederation and was abolished in 1975.

== Members of Provincial Parliament ==
Waterloo South
Assembly	Years	Member	Party
1st	1867–1871	Isaac Clemens	Liberal
2nd	1871–1875	Isaac Clemens	Liberal
3rd	1875–1877	John Fleming	Liberal
3rd	1877–1879	Isaac Master	Liberal
4th	1879–1883	Isaac Master	Liberal
5th	1883–1886	Isaac Master	Liberal
6th	1886–1890	Isaac Master	Liberal
7th	1890–1894	John Douglas Moore	Liberal
8th	1894–1898	John Douglas Moore	Liberal
9th	1898–1902	William Abram Kribs	Conservative
10th	1902–1905	William Abram Kribs	Conservative
11th	1905–1908	George Pattinson	Conservative
12th	1908–1911	George Pattinson	Conservative
13th	1911–1914	George Pattinson	Conservative
14th	1914–1919	Zachariah Adam Hall	Conservative
15th	1919–1923	Karl Homuth	Labour-United Farmers
16th	1923–1926	Karl Homuth	Labour
17th	1926–1929	Karl Homuth	Labour
18th	1929–1930	Karl Homuth	Conservative
18th	1930–1934	Norman Hipel	Liberal
19th	1934–1937	Norman Hipel	Liberal
20th	1937–1943	Norman Hipel	Liberal
21st	1943–1945	Leonard Grieve Robinson	Co-operative Commonwealth
22nd	1945–1948	Gordon Chaplin	Progressive Conservative
23rd	1948–1951	Theodore Isley	Co-operative Commonwealth
24th	1951–1955	Raymond Munro Myers	Progressive Conservative
25th	1955–1959	Raymond Munro Myers	Progressive Conservative
26th	1959–1963	Raymond Munro Myers	Progressive Conservative
27th	1963–1967	Allan Reuter	Progressive Conservative
28th	1967–1971	Allan Reuter	Progressive Conservative
29th	1971–1975	Allan Reuter	Progressive Conservative
Riding dissolved

== Electoral history ==
1867 Ontario general election: Waterloo South
Party	Candidate	Votes	%
Liberal	Isaac Clemens	1,309	57.59
Conservative	J. Crombie	964	42.41
Total valid votes		2,273	81.59
Eligible voters		2,786	
Liberal pickup new district.			
Source: Elections Ontario

1871 Ontario general election: Waterloo South
Party	Candidate	Votes	%	±%
Liberal	Isaac Clemens	1,215	60.27	+2.68
Conservative	Mr. Erb	801	39.73	−2.68
Turnout		2,016	69.42	−12.17
Eligible voters		2,904		
Liberal hold		Swing		+2.68
Source: Elections Ontario

1875 Ontario general election: Waterloo South
Party	Candidate	Votes
Liberal	John Fleming	Acclaimed
Source: Elections Ontario

Ontario provincial by-election, January 9, 1878: Waterloo South Death of John Fleming
Party	Candidate	Votes	%
Liberal	Isaac Master	1,252	50.10
Independent	Mr. Merners	1,247	49.90
Total valid votes		2,499	
Liberal hold			
Source: History of the Electoral Districts, Legislatures and Ministries of the Province of Ontario

1879 Ontario general election: Waterloo South
Party	Candidate	Votes	%	±%
Liberal	James Livingston	1,699	57.38	+7.28
Conservative	T.P. Phin	1,262	42.62	
Total valid votes		2,961	72.06	
Eligible voters		4,109		
Liberal hold		Swing		+7.28
Source: Elections Ontario

== See also ==
- List of Ontario provincial electoral districts
- Canadian provincial electoral districts
- List of Canadian electoral districts
