= Waterloo South (federal electoral district) =

Former federal electoral district in Ontario, Canada

Ontario electoral district

Defunct federal electoral district
- Legislature: House of Commons
- District created: 1867
- District abolished: 1968
- First contested: 1867
- Last contested: 1965

Waterloo South was a federal electoral district in Ontario, Canada, that was represented in the House of Commons of Canada from 1867 to 1968.

Waterloo South was created by the British North America Act 1867 using an 1859 definition of the "South Riding of Waterloo", which consisted of the Town of Galt and the Villages of Preston, New Hamburg, and Hespeler, as well as the Townships of South Waterloo, North Dumfries and Wilmot.

In 1903, it was redefined to consist of the townships of North Dumfries, South Waterloo and Wilmot, and the towns of Ayr, Galt, Hespeler, New Hamburg and Preston. Beginning in 1924, the riding was called "Waterloo South".

The electoral district was abolished in 1968 when it was redistributed between Kitchener, Perth and Waterloo ridings.

== Members of Parliament ==
Parliament	Years	Member	Party
1st	1867–1872	James Young	Liberal
2nd	1872–1874	James Young	Liberal
3rd	1874–1878	James Young	Liberal
4th	1878–1882	Samuel Merner	Conservative
5th	1882–1887	James Livingston	Liberal
6th	1887–1891	James Livingston	Liberal
7th	1891–1896	James Livingston	Liberal
8th	1896–1900	James Livingston	Liberal
9th	1900–1904	George Adam Clare	Conservative
10th	1904–1908	George Adam Clare	Conservative
11th	1908–1911	George Adam Clare	Conservative
12th	1911–1915	George Adam Clare	Conservative
12th	1915–1917	Frank Stewart Scott	Conservative
13th	1917–1921	Frank Stewart Scott	Government (Unionist)
14th	1921–1925	William Elliott	Progressive
15th	1925–1926	Alexander Edwards	Conservative
16th	1926–1930	Alexander Edwards	Conservative
17th	1930–1935	Alexander Edwards	Conservative
18th	1935–1938	Alexander Edwards	Conservative
18th	1935–1938	Karl Homuth	Conservative
19th	1940–1945	Karl Homuth	National Government
20th	1945–1949	Karl Homuth	Progressive Conservative
21st	1949–1951	Karl Homuth	Progressive Conservative
21st	1951–1953	Howie Meeker	Progressive Conservative
22nd	1953–1957	Arthur White	Liberal
23rd	1957–1958	William Anderson	Progressive Conservative
24th	1958–1962	William Anderson	Progressive Conservative
25th	1962–1963	Gordon Chaplin	Progressive Conservative
26th	1963–1964	Gordon Chaplin	Progressive Conservative
26th	1964–1965	Max Saltsman	New Democratic
27th	1965–1968	Max Saltsman	New Democratic
Riding dissolved into Kitchener, Perth and Waterloo

== Electoral history ==
1867 Canadian federal election
Party	Candidate	Votes	%
Liberal	James Young	1,324	58.02
Unknown	James Cowan	958	41.98
Total valid votes		2,282	100.0
Source(s) "Waterloo South, Ontario (1867-1968)". History of Federal Ridings Since 1867. Library of Parliament.

1872 Canadian federal election
Party	Candidate	Votes	%	±%
Liberal	James Young	acclaimed	–	–
Total valid votes		–	–	
Liberal hold		Swing		–
Source(s) "Waterloo South, Ontario (1867-1968)". History of Federal Ridings Since 1867. Library of Parliament.

1874 Canadian federal election
Party	Candidate	Votes	%	±%
Liberal	James Young	acclaimed	–	–
Total valid votes		–	–	
Liberal hold		Swing		–
Source(s) "Waterloo South, Ontario (1867-1968)". History of Federal Ridings Since 1867. Library of Parliament.

1878 Canadian federal election
Party	Candidate	Votes	%	±%
Conservative	Samuel Merner	1,468	50.76	–
Liberal	James Young	1,424	49.24	–
Total valid votes		2,892	100.0	
Conservative gain from Liberal		Swing		–
Source(s) "Waterloo South, Ontario (1867-1968)". History of Federal Ridings Since 1867. Library of Parliament.

1882 Canadian federal election
Party	Candidate	Votes	%	±%
Liberal	James Livingston	1,580	53.52	+4.28
Conservative	Samuel Merner	1,372	46.48	-4.28
Total valid votes		2,952	100.0	
Liberal gain from Conservative		Swing		+4.28
Source(s) "Waterloo South, Ontario (1867-1968)". History of Federal Ridings Since 1867. Library of Parliament.

1887 Canadian federal election
Party	Candidate	Votes	%	±%
Liberal	James Livingston	2,254	54.44	+0.88
Conservative	Thomas Cowan	1,886	45.56	-0.92
Total valid votes		4,140	100.0	
Liberal hold		Swing		+0.90
Source(s) "Waterloo South, Ontario (1867-1968)". History of Federal Ridings Since 1867. Library of Parliament.

1891 Canadian federal election
Party	Candidate	Votes	%	±%
Liberal	James Livingston	2,228	53.76	-0.68
Conservative	George Adam Clare	1,916	46.24	+0.68
Total valid votes		4,144	100.0	
Liberal hold		Swing		-0.68
Source(s) "Waterloo South, Ontario (1867-1968)". History of Federal Ridings Since 1867. Library of Parliament.

1896 Canadian federal election
Party	Candidate	Votes	%	±%
Liberal	James Livingston	2,543	50.89	-2.87
Conservative	George Adam Clare	2,454	49.11	+2.87
Total valid votes		4,144	100.0	
Liberal hold		Swing		-2.87
Source(s) "Waterloo South, Ontario (1867-1968)". History of Federal Ridings Since 1867. Library of Parliament.

1900 Canadian federal election
Party	Candidate	Votes	%	±%
Conservative	George Adam Clare	2,708	52.10	+1.21
Liberal	Peter Shantz	2,490	47.90	-1.21
Total valid votes		5,198	100.0	
Conservative gain from Liberal		Swing		+1.21
Source(s) "Waterloo South, Ontario (1867-1968)". History of Federal Ridings Since 1867. Library of Parliament.

1904 Canadian federal election
Party	Candidate	Votes	%	±%
Conservative	George Adam Clare	2,785	53.51	+1.41
Liberal	George Laird	2,420	46.49	+1.41
Total valid votes		5,205	100.0	
Conservative hold		Swing		+1.41
Source(s) "Waterloo South, Ontario (1867-1968)". History of Federal Ridings Since 1867. Library of Parliament.

1908 Canadian federal election
Party	Candidate	Votes	%	±%
Conservative	George Adam Clare	3,015	51.72	-1.79
Liberal	Sylvester Moyer	2,815	48.28	+1.79
Total valid votes		5,830	100.0	
Conservative hold		Swing		-1.79
Source(s) "Waterloo South, Ontario (1867-1968)". History of Federal Ridings Since 1867. Library of Parliament.

1911 Canadian federal election
Party	Candidate	Votes	%	±%
Conservative	George Adam Clare	3,492	56.96	+5.24
Liberal	Sylvester Moyer	2,639	43.04	-5.24
Total valid votes		6,131	100.0	
Conservative hold		Swing		+5.24
Source(s) "Waterloo South, Ontario (1867-1968)". History of Federal Ridings Since 1867. Library of Parliament.

Canadian federal by-election, February 1, 1915 Death of George Adam Clare
Party	Candidate	Votes	%	±%
Conservative	Frank Stewart Scott	acclaimed	–	–
Total valid votes		–	–	
Conservative hold		Swing		–
Source(s) "Waterloo South, Ontario (1867-1968)". History of Federal Ridings Since 1867. Library of Parliament.

1917 Canadian federal election
Party	Candidate	Votes	%	±%
Government (Unionist)	Frank Stewart Scott	5,681	56.98	–
Opposition (Laurier Liberals)	Adam Thomson	2,894	29.02	–
Labour	Thomas Hall	1,396	14.00	–
Total valid votes		9,971	100.0	
Government (Unionist) hold		Swing		–
Source(s) "Waterloo South, Ontario (1867-1968)". History of Federal Ridings Since 1867. Library of Parliament.

1921 Canadian federal election
Party	Candidate	Votes	%	±%
Progressive	William Elliott	7,429	52.85	–
Conservative	Frank Stewart Scott	6,629	47.15	-9.83
Total valid votes		14,058	100.0	
Progressive gain		Swing		–
Source(s) "Waterloo South, Ontario (1867-1968)". History of Federal Ridings Since 1867. Library of Parliament.

1925 Canadian federal election
Party	Candidate	Votes	%	±%
Conservative	Alexander Edwards	8,089	61.06	+13.91
Progressive	William Elliott	5,158	38.94	-13.91
Total valid votes		13,247	100.0	
Conservative gain from Progressive		Swing		+13.91
Source(s) "Waterloo South, Ontario (1867-1968)". History of Federal Ridings Since 1867. Library of Parliament.

1926 Canadian federal election
Party	Candidate	Votes	%	±%
Conservative	Alexander Edwards	7,220	59.40	-1.66
Liberal	Charles Widdifield	4,935	40.60	–
Total valid votes		12,155	100.0	
Conservative hold		Swing		–
Source(s) "Waterloo South, Ontario (1867-1968)". History of Federal Ridings Since 1867. Library of Parliament.

1930 Canadian federal election
Party	Candidate	Votes	%	±%
Conservative	Alexander Edwards	8,999	64.51	+5.11
Liberal	Charles Widdifield	4,950	35.49	-5.11
Total valid votes		13,949	100.0	
Conservative hold		Swing		+5.11
Source(s) "Waterloo South, Ontario (1867-1968)". History of Federal Ridings Since 1867. Library of Parliament. Archived from the original on 21 July 2015.

1935 Canadian federal election
Party	Candidate	Votes	%	±%
Conservative	Alexander Edwards	6,731	40.15	-24.36
Liberal	David S. Charlton	6,606	39.41	+3.92
Co-operative Commonwealth	Felix Lazarus	2,426	14.47	–
Reconstruction	Harvey Orton Hawke	1,000	5.97	–
Total valid votes		16,763	100.0	
Conservative hold		Swing		-14.14
Source(s) "Waterloo South, Ontario (1867-1968)". History of Federal Ridings Since 1867. Library of Parliament.

Canadian federal by-election, November 14, 1938 Death of Alexander Edwards
Party	Candidate	Votes	%	±%
Conservative	Karl Homuth	7,776	51.67	+11.52
Liberal	R. Kenneth Serviss	3,730	24.78	-14.63
Unknown	John Mitchell	3,544	23.55	–
Total valid votes		15,050	100.00	
Conservative hold		Swing		+13.08
Source(s) "Waterloo South, Ontario (1867-1968)". History of Federal Ridings Since 1867. Library of Parliament.

1940 Canadian federal election
Party	Candidate	Votes	%	±%
National Government	Karl Homuth	7,432	46.58	-5.09
Liberal	Patrick Joseph Flynn	6,975	43.71	+18.93
Co-operative Commonwealth	Vardon Stanley Latsch	2,426	9.71	–
Total valid votes		15,956	100.0	
National Government hold		Swing		-12.01
Source(s) "Waterloo South, Ontario (1867-1968)". History of Federal Ridings Since 1867. Library of Parliament.

1945 Canadian federal election
Party	Candidate	Votes	%	±%
Progressive Conservative	Karl Homuth	9,201	46.42	-0.16
Liberal	Patrick Joseph Flynn	5,824	29.38	-14.33
Co-operative Commonwealth	Frank Alexander Ferguson	4,795	24.19	+14.48
Total valid votes		19,820	100.0	
Progressive Conservative hold		Swing		+7.09
Source(s) "Waterloo South, Ontario (1867-1968)". History of Federal Ridings Since 1867. Library of Parliament.

1949 Canadian federal election
Party	Candidate	Votes	%	±%
Progressive Conservative	Karl Homuth	8,740	38.74	-7.68
Liberal	J. Mel Moffatt	8,397	37.22	+7.84
Co-operative Commonwealth	Paul Dufresne	5,425	24.04	-0.15
Total valid votes		22,562	100.0	
Progressive Conservative hold		Swing		-15.52
Source(s) "Waterloo South, Ontario (1867-1968)". History of Federal Ridings Since 1867. Library of Parliament.

Canadian federal by-election, June 25, 1951 Death of Karl Homuth
Party	Candidate	Votes	%	±%
Progressive Conservative	Howie Meeker	8,950	42.24	+3.50
Liberal	J. Mel Moffatt	6,483	30.60	-6.62
Co-operative Commonwealth	Margaret Geens	5,754	27.16	+3.12
Total valid votes		21,187	100.0	
Progressive Conservative hold		Swing		+5.06
Source(s) "Waterloo South, Ontario (1867-1968)". History of Federal Ridings Since 1867. Library of Parliament.

1953 Canadian federal election
Party	Candidate	Votes	%	±%
Liberal	Arthur White	9,058	41.78	+11.18
Progressive Conservative	Robert Ross Barber	7,309	33.71	-8.53
Co-operative Commonwealth	Peggy Geens	4,039	18.63	-8.53
Social Credit	Jim Johannes	1,275	5.88	–
Total valid votes		21,681	100.0	
Liberal gain from Progressive Conservative		Swing		+9.86
Source(s) "Waterloo South, Ontario (1867-1968)". History of Federal Ridings Since 1867. Library of Parliament.

1957 Canadian federal election
Party	Candidate	Votes	%	±%
Progressive Conservative	William Anderson	11,699	47.38	+5.60
Liberal	Arthur White	7,450	30.17	-3.54
Co-operative Commonwealth	Theodore Isley	4,009	16.24	-2.39
Social Credit	George Hancock	1,532	6.20	+0.32
Total valid votes		24,690	100.0	
Progressive Conservative gain from Liberal		Swing		+4.57
Source(s) "Waterloo South, Ontario (1867-1968)". History of Federal Ridings Since 1867. Library of Parliament.

1958 Canadian federal election
Party	Candidate	Votes	%	±%
Progressive Conservative	William Anderson	15,624	60.48	+13.10
Liberal	Marjorie Oliver	5,793	22.43	-7.74
Co-operative Commonwealth	Theodore Isley	4,415	17.09	+0.85
Total valid votes		25,832	100.0	
Progressive Conservative hold		Swing		+10.42
Source(s) "Waterloo South, Ontario (1867-1968)". History of Federal Ridings Since 1867. Library of Parliament.

1962 Canadian federal election
Party	Candidate	Votes	%	±%
Progressive Conservative	Gordon Chaplin	11,648	42.31	-18.17
Liberal	Donald Shaver	8,132	29.54	+7.11
New Democratic	Rod Stewart	7,186	26.10	+9.01
Social Credit	Peter Fast	566	2.06	–
Total valid votes		27,532	100.0	
Progressive Conservative hold		Swing		-12.64
Source(s) "Waterloo South, Ontario (1867-1968)". History of Federal Ridings Since 1867. Library of Parliament.

1963 Canadian federal election
Party	Candidate	Votes	%	±%
Progressive Conservative	Gordon Chaplin	11,479	40.93	-1.38
Liberal	Donald Shaver	8,792	31.35	+1.81
New Democratic	Rod Stewart	7,403	26.40	+0.30
Social Credit	Ted Bezan	372	1.33	-0.73
Total valid votes		28,046	100.0	
Progressive Conservative hold		Swing		-1.60
Source(s) "Waterloo South, Ontario (1867-1968)". History of Federal Ridings Since 1867. Library of Parliament.

Canadian federal by-election, November 9, 1964 Death of Gordon Chaplin
Party	Candidate	Votes	%	±%
New Democratic	Max Saltsman	12,417	44.25	+17.85
Progressive Conservative	Jim Chaplin	10,078	35.92	-5.01
Liberal	Rod Stewart	5,563	19.83	-11.52
Total valid votes		28,058	100.0	
New Democratic gain from Progressive Conservative		Swing		+11.43
Source(s) "Waterloo South, Ontario (1867-1968)". History of Federal Ridings Since 1867. Library of Parliament.

1965 Canadian federal election
Party	Candidate	Votes	%	±%
New Democratic	Max Saltsman	13,337	46.15	+1.90
Progressive Conservative	Jim Chaplin	9,678	33.49	-2.43
Liberal	Reid Menary	5,886	20.37	+0.54
Total valid votes		28,901	100.0	
New Democratic hold		Swing		+2.17
Source(s) "Waterloo South, Ontario (1867-1968)". History of Federal Ridings Since 1867. Library of Parliament.

== See also ==
- List of Canadian electoral districts
- Historical federal electoral districts of Canada
