= James Livingston (Canadian politician) =

Canadian politician

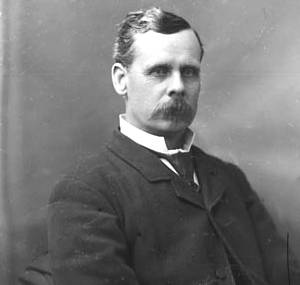
- James Livingston; Source: Library and Archives Canada

Member of Parliament for Waterloo South
- In office 1882–1900
- Preceded by: Samuel Merner
- Succeeded by: George Adam Clare

Personal details
- Born: November 29, 1838 East Kilbride, Scotland
- Died: April 15, 1920 (aged 81)
- Party: Liberal
- Spouse: Louise Liersch (m. 1861)
- Children: 12
- Occupation: Businessman

James Livingston (November 29, 1838 – April 15, 1920) was a Canadian businessman and politician. He represented Waterloo South in the Legislative Assembly of Ontario from 1879 to 1882 and in the House of Commons of Canada from 1882 to 1900 as a Liberal member.

== Life and career ==
He was born in East Kilbride, Scotland in 1838, the son of a weaver. He worked at weaving as a youth and then came to Perth County, Canada West in 1856. A year later, Livingston moved to Conestogo in Waterloo County where he worked for flax growers, soon afterwards becoming manager. In 1865, he went into business with his brother growing flax at Wellesley. The company expanded into the production of linseed oil at Baden, also opening a foundry and general store. The business steadily expanded due to Livingston's shrewd business sense, and quickly acquired holdings in Western Canada as well as Michigan. As both the Livingston family and business grew, James required the assistance of his new son-in-law, who managed the Michigan holdings.

He served as reeve for Wilmot Township from 1878 to 1879. In 1879, he was elected to the Ontario assembly but resigned his seat in 1882 to run for a seat in the federal parliament. He died in Kitchener at the age of 81. He is buried at Fairmount Cemetery in Baden.

Livingston's former residence, Castle Kilbride, has been designated a Canadian National Historic Site.

Livingston married Louise Liersch in 1861, with whom he had 12 children: eight daughters and four sons. John Peter (J.P.), one of James' sons, succeeded his father as head of the Livingston empire; he acquired the famed home, "Castle Kilbride", upon James' death in 1920. J.P. and wife, Laura, had one child, Laura Louise Livingston. Laura Louise married Harris Veitch, who together had three children. By the fifth decade of the twentieth century, the flax industry had begun a decline, and so too did the Livingston empire. Laura Louise and Harris were forced to sell the home by 1986, and auctioned off the home's furnishings in 1988. Unfortunately "Castle Kilbride" sat vacant for number of years until the Township of Wilmot purchased it and restored it to its original Victorian Era beauty. The Livingston home remains 'the jewel of Wilmot Township'.

== Electoral record ==
1896 Canadian federal election: Waterloo South
Party	Candidate	Votes	%	±%
Liberal	James Livingston	2,543	50.89	-2.87
Conservative	George Adam Clare	2,454	49.11	+2.87
Total valid votes		4,144	100.0	
Liberal hold		Swing		-2.87
Source(s) "Waterloo South, Ontario (1867-1968)". History of Federal Ridings Since 1867. Library of Parliament.

1891 Canadian federal election: Waterloo South
Party	Candidate	Votes	%	±%
Liberal	James Livingston	2,228	53.76	-0.68
Conservative	George Adam Clare	1,916	46.24	+0.68
Total valid votes		4,144	100.0	
Liberal hold		Swing		-0.68
Source(s) "Waterloo South, Ontario (1867-1968)". History of Federal Ridings Since 1867. Library of Parliament.

1887 Canadian federal election: Waterloo South
Party	Candidate	Votes	%	±%
Liberal	James Livingston	2,254	54.44	+0.88
Conservative	Thomas Cowan	1,886	45.56	-0.92
Total valid votes		4,140	100.0	
Liberal hold		Swing		+0.90
Source(s) "Waterloo South, Ontario (1867-1968)". History of Federal Ridings Since 1867. Library of Parliament.

1882 Canadian federal election: Waterloo South
Party	Candidate	Votes	%	±%
Liberal	James Livingston	1,580	53.52	+4.28
Conservative	Samuel Merner	1,372	46.48	-4.28
Total valid votes		2,952	100.0	
Liberal gain from Conservative		Swing		+4.28
Source(s) "Waterloo South, Ontario (1867-1968)". History of Federal Ridings Since 1867. Library of Parliament.

Parliament of Canada
Preceded by Samuel Merner	Member of Parliament from Waterloo South; 1882–1900	Succeeded by George Adam Clare
