= Hespeler, Ontario =

Hespeler
- Neighbourhood/ Dissolved town
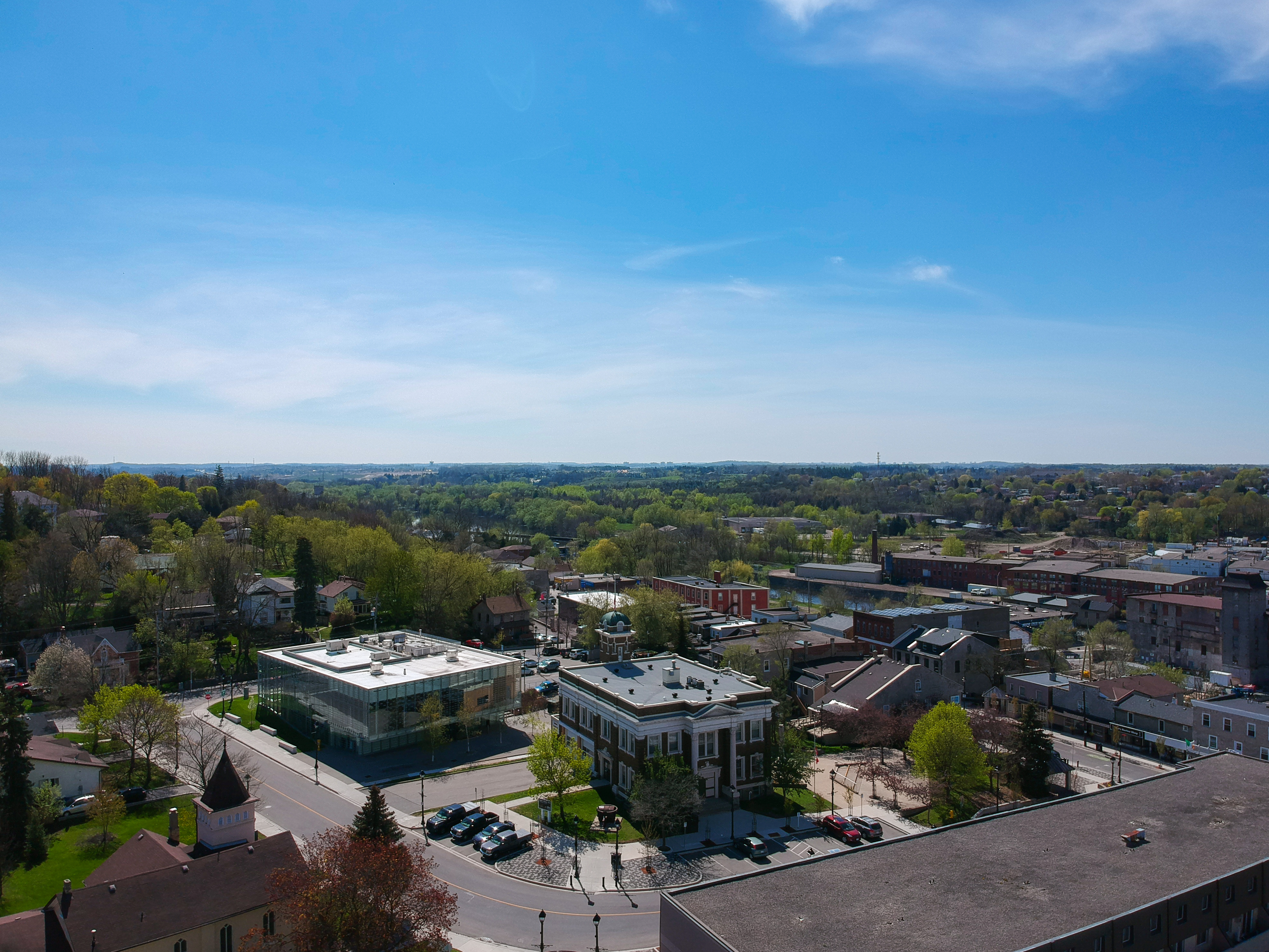
- Nickname: The Beehive
- Location within Regional Municipality of Waterloo Location within Southern Ontario
- Coordinates: 43°25′59″N 80°18′26″W
- Country: Canada
- Province: Ontario
- Regional municipality: Waterloo
- City: Cambridge
- Settled: 1830
- Incorporated: 1901
- Amalgamated: 1973
- Time zone: UTC-5 (EST)
  - Summer (DST): UTC-4 (EDT)
- Forward sortation area: N1P, N1R, N1S, N1T, N3C, N3H
- Area codes: 519 and 226
- NTS Map: 040P08
- GNBC Code: FCKDQ

Hespeler is a neighbourhood and former town within Cambridge, Ontario, located along the Speed River in the Regional Municipality of Waterloo, Ontario, Canada. In 1973, Hespeler, Preston, Galt, and the hamlet of Blair were amalgamated to form the City of Cambridge.

No population data is available for the former Hespeler since the census reports cover only the full area of Cambridge. However, the combined population of the census tracts that cover what is now Hespeler was 26,391 as of the 2016 Canada Census.

The neighbourhood of Hespeler is located in the most northeasterly section of Cambridge. Even in the early days it had an industrial base, primarily activity from woolen and textile mills.

== History ==
This area of the Grand River valley was once the territory of a people known by their Huron neighbours as Attawandaron, which means ‘people who speak differently’. French explorers in the early 1600s called these same people ‘Neutrals’ because they maintained peaceful relations with both their Huron and Iroquois neighbours. In 1650, invading Iroquois conquered Neutral territory during the Beaver Wars. In 1784, the Grand River Valley was granted by the British Crown to Loyalist Iroquois, led by Thayendanegea (Joseph Brant).

The area that eventually came to be Hespeler was on land (Block 2 measuring over 90,000 acres (360 km^{2}) purchased in 1798 by a group of Mennonites from Pennsylvania from the Six Nations Indians with the assistance of developer Richard Beasley. The first settler, in 1809, was Abraham Clemens who had bought 515 acres (2.1 km^{2}) of land from Mr. Beasley. In 1810, Cornelius Pannabecker arrived and set up a blacksmithy a year or two later. Twenty years later, Joseph Oberholtzer purchased a much larger area of land that would become the early Hespeler. Initially, it was named Bergeytown in honour of his brother-in-law and the name became New Hope in about 1835.

Settler Jacob Hespeler arrived in 1845 and bought a 145 acres (0.59 km^{2}) tract on the Speed River. He built an industrial complex that was the beginning of Hespeler's future industrialization, which would consist primarily of woollen and textile mills. Records from 1846 indicate a population of only 100 inhabitants, a grist and a saw mill, a tannery, a tavern, one store, one pail factory, two blacksmiths, two tailors, two shoemakers.

The arrival of the railway in 1859 helped business and the population was adequate for Hespeler to be incorporated as a village that year. In 1869 the population was 1200 and the community contained several large manufacturers including a knitting mill and a woolens factory. Continued growth allowed Hespeler to be incorporated as a town in January 1901.

Over the following years the community continued growing slowly. By 1911 the electric railway system between Preston and Galt had reached Hespeler as well as Berlin (later called Kitchener) and Waterloo; by 1916 it had been extended to Brantford/Port Dover.

Historically, the town's largest employer began as the woollen mill J. Schofield Co. in 1864. In 1928, that company was known as Dominion Woollens and Worsteds and advertised it was the largest woollen mill in the British Empire. During World War II, the mill supplied Canada with most of its wool for uniforms. Other textile companies also opened in the early 1900s and continued to be successful until the late 1940s, when they began to decline. Dominion Woolens, for example, was facing bankruptcy by 1959 and was sold to Silknit, which eventually closed the plant in 1984. Other industry was still quite successful and by 1969, Hespeler's population was 6,000.

The town was also home to the Hespeler Hockey Stick Co. since 1905. The Hespeler Shamrocks is the name of the minor hockey teams in town run by Hespeler Minor Hockey Association under the Ontario Minor Hockey Association. Graduates include Kirk Maltby and Paul Woods of the Detroit Red Wings, Tim Brent of the Toronto Maple Leafs, Ken Ellacott of the Vancouver Canucks, Don "Red" Laurence of the Atlanta Flames, and former NHL linesman Bob Hodges.

=== The Galt, Preston and Hespeler Electric Railway ===
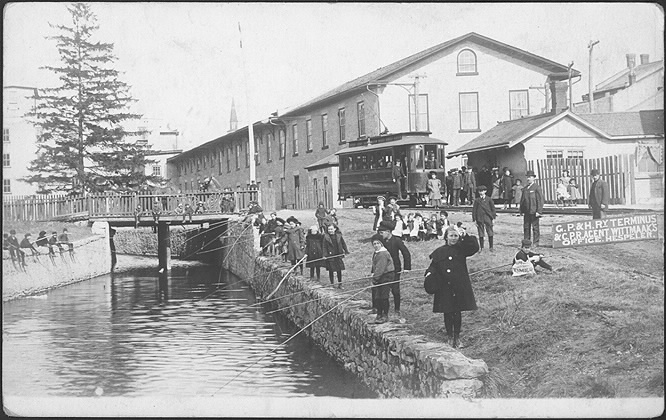
An interurban streetcar connected Hespeler to nearby Preston and Galt.

A new streetcar system, the Galt, Preston and Hespeler electric railway (later called the Grand River Railway Company) began to operate in 1894, connecting Preston and Galt. In 1911, the line reached Hespeler, Berlin (later called Kitchener) and Waterloo; by 1916 it had been extended to Brantford/Port Dover. The electric rail system ended passenger services in April, 1955.

== Government ==
Hespeler's municipal government is administered by Cambridge City Council, consisting of Mayor Kathryn McGarry and eight ward councillors.

Hespeler is also represented on the Waterloo Regional Council, consisting of a Regional Chair, the Mayors of seven area cities and townships, and eight additional Councillors - four from Kitchener and two each from Cambridge and Waterloo.

The MPP for Hespeler is Jess Dixon of the Progressive Conservative Party of Ontario, elected in 2022.

Hespeler's federal MP is Matt Strauss of the Conservative Party of Canada, elected in the 2025 Canadian federal election.

== Municipal services ==
Hespeler was an independent entity in Waterloo County, Ontario until 1973 when amalgamation created the Regional Municipality of Waterloo. At that time, Hespeler was amalgamated into the new city of Cambridge. The Region handles many services, including Fire, Police, waste management, community health, transit, recreation, planning, roads and social services.

The Region consists of the cities of Cambridge, Kitchener, and Waterloo, and the townships of Woolwich, Wilmot, Wellesley, and North Dumfries.

=== Public transportation ===
Since 2000, public transport throughout the Region of Waterloo has been provided by Grand River Transit, which was created by a merger of the former Cambridge Transit and Kitchener Transit.

GRT operates a number of routes in Cambridge, four of which travel outside of the city: presently the 206, 61, 203, and 57 buses run to southern Kitchener, while the iXpress limited-stop express route runs from the Ainslie St. Transit Terminal (Galt) through Kitchener to the north end of Waterloo.

==== Transit terminal ====
Hespeler Transit Terminal

General information
- Coordinates: 43°25′09″N 80°19′32″W
- Owner: Grand River Transit
- Platforms: 4
Location

The terminal is located curbside at the southwest corner of Groh Avenue and Holiday Inn Drive, just down Groebel Avenue from Queen Street. It serves as a transfer and connection point for Grand River Transit (GRT) bus routes.

==== GRT bus service ====
- 51A Hespeler Rd. to Fisher Mills via Queen Street
- 51B Hespeler Rd. to Melran
- Route 51 Hespeler Rd. to Ainslie Street Terminal

==== Light Rapid Transit ====
In June 2009 Regional Council voted to approve a plan to construct a light rail line, which has been named the Ion rapid transit. The first phase would run from Conestoga Mall in the north of Waterloo, to Fairview Park Mall in the south of Kitchener.

The second phase of the line would run from Fairview Mall to the Galt area of Cambridge. There is no current plan for extension to Hespeler.

As of late February 2017, the Kitchener-Waterloo portion was well into the final phase of construction, but plans for the Cambridge section of the LRT were still in the very early stage. Public consultations were just getting started at the time. Three routes had been agreed on in 2011, with eight "endorsed" stops: at Fairway, Sportsworld, Preston, Pinebush, Cambridge Centre Mall, Can-Amera, Delta and Ainslie Street Terminal. Three others were still being considered.

== Downtown ==
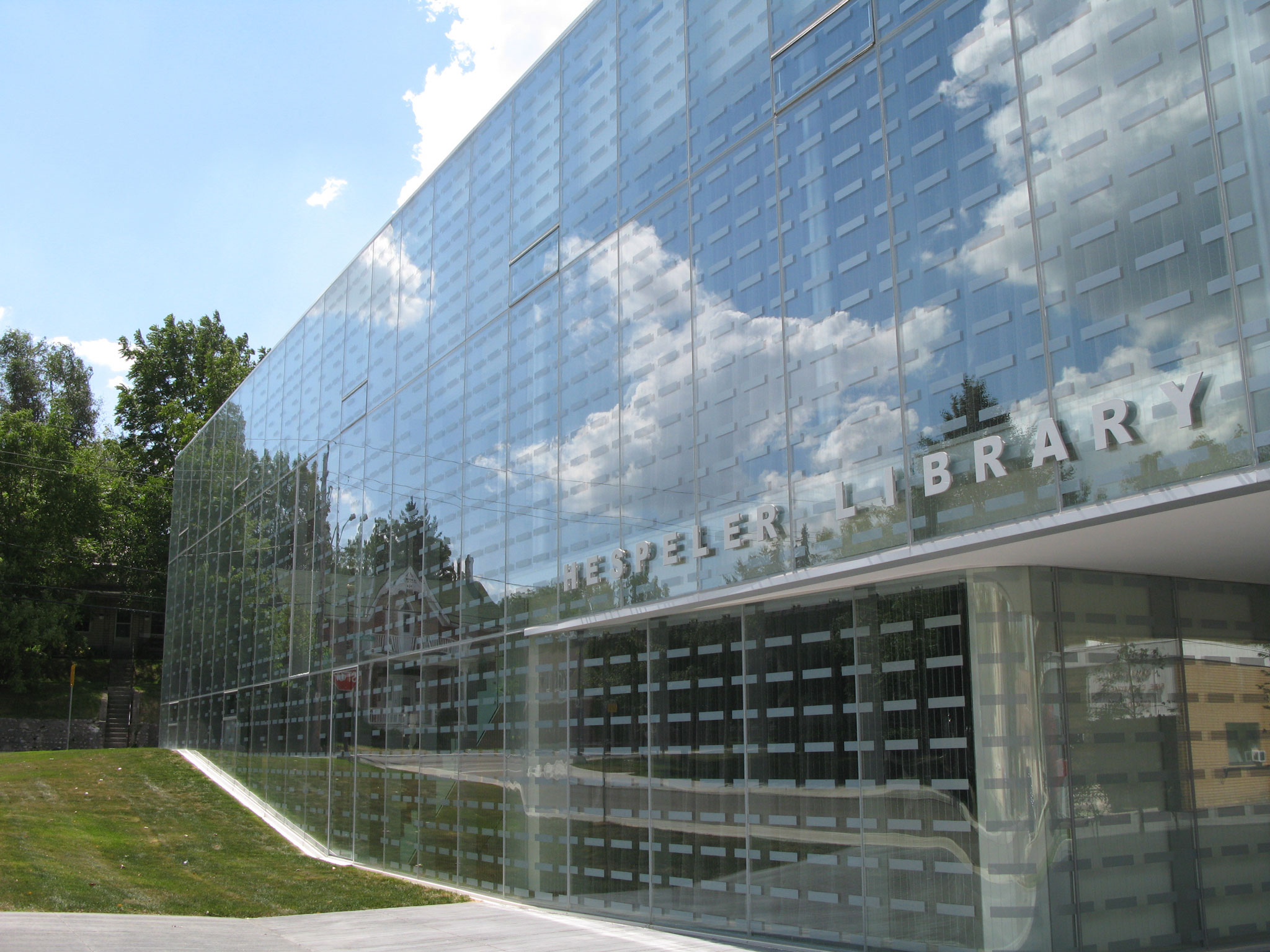
The Hespeler Library was retrofitted by installing a glass enclosure around the historic Carnegie building.

The Old Town and Fire Hall is one of the oldest buildings in Hespeler, and originally functioned as a Town Hall when Hespeler operated as an independent municipality. It still functions as a fire hall and is the location of the Company of Neighbours, a heritage organization.

The Hespeler Library was originally an early twentieth century Carnegie library. In the early 2000s, a glass enclosure was built around it.

The Hespeler Train Station, formerly located on Guelph Avenue, was used for passenger trains in the early 1900s to 1950s. Queen Elizabeth passed through the station in the 1950s. It was destroyed following an act of arson on October 31, 2003.

The former post office, built 1928, is now the home of the Fashion History Museum

Due to many of the structures in downtown still being the original constructions from the 1900s, many TV shows and Movies have been filmed using the buildings along and surrounding Queen Street and the general Downtown area. Some popular TV series that is widely known to have been filmed in Hespeler, Ontario is the werewolf drama titled Bitten, and 11.22.63, a Stephen King novel TV adaptation. These shows assisted in the development of the sewer and waterways running underneath Queen street by influencing the tearing up and repaving of the street in order to accommodate the film crews.

== Education ==
Public English-language schooling is provided by the Waterloo Region District School Board, which operates 26 elementary and five secondary schools in Cambridge.

Publicly funded Catholic education is available through schools operated by the Waterloo Catholic District School Board.

Hespeler has several elementary schools and one high school, Jacob Hespeler Secondary School, named after the town's founder. A chemistry teacher at Jacob Hespeler Secondary School, Yvonne Clifford, was the 2015 recipient of the Chemical Institute of Canada Beaumier Award for High School/CEGEP Chemistry Teachers. Hespeler is also home to the post-secondary Heritage Baptist College and Heritage Theological Seminary.

The University of Waterloo School of Architecture campus is located in nearby Galt in the Riverside Silk Mill, also known as the Tiger Brand Building. Inside there is a theatre, a fitness room, and the gallery "Design at Riverside", which is one of two publicly funded galleries dedicated to architecture in Canada. The School of Architecture is home to 380 students who live, study, and learn within the Cambridge community.

== Recreation ==
Hespeler offers many different recreational activities for its residents. There are many parks, three of the largest being Woodland, Silver Heights, and Forbes, the latter housing a tennis club.

The Johnson Centre, a community centre, is located just across the street from Forbes Park. Its facilities include a swimming pool, sauna, gymnasium, exercise rooms, and areas for local organizations and clubs to meet in.

The Speed River offers various recreational activities, such as canoeing and fishing.

There are several trails running throughout Hespeler. The Mill Run Trail, beginning at Sheffield Street, leads through Chilligo Conservation Area and part of the former site of Idylwild Park, to Cambridge's largest park, Riverside Park, in the town of Preston.

== See also ==
- Preston, Ontario
- Regional Municipality of Waterloo
- Speed River
- List of Carnegie libraries in Canada
- Hespeler Hockey
- Grand River Railway
- Grand River Transit
- Grand Trunk Railway
- Great Western Railway
- Regional Municipality of Waterloo
