= Waterloo South =

Waterloo South may refer to:

== Places ==
- Waterloo South (federal electoral district): federal electoral district from 1867 to 1968.
- Waterloo South (provincial electoral district): provincial electoral district from 1867 to 1975.

== See also ==
- Waterloo North
