= Karl Kenneth Homuth =

Canadian politician and manufacturer

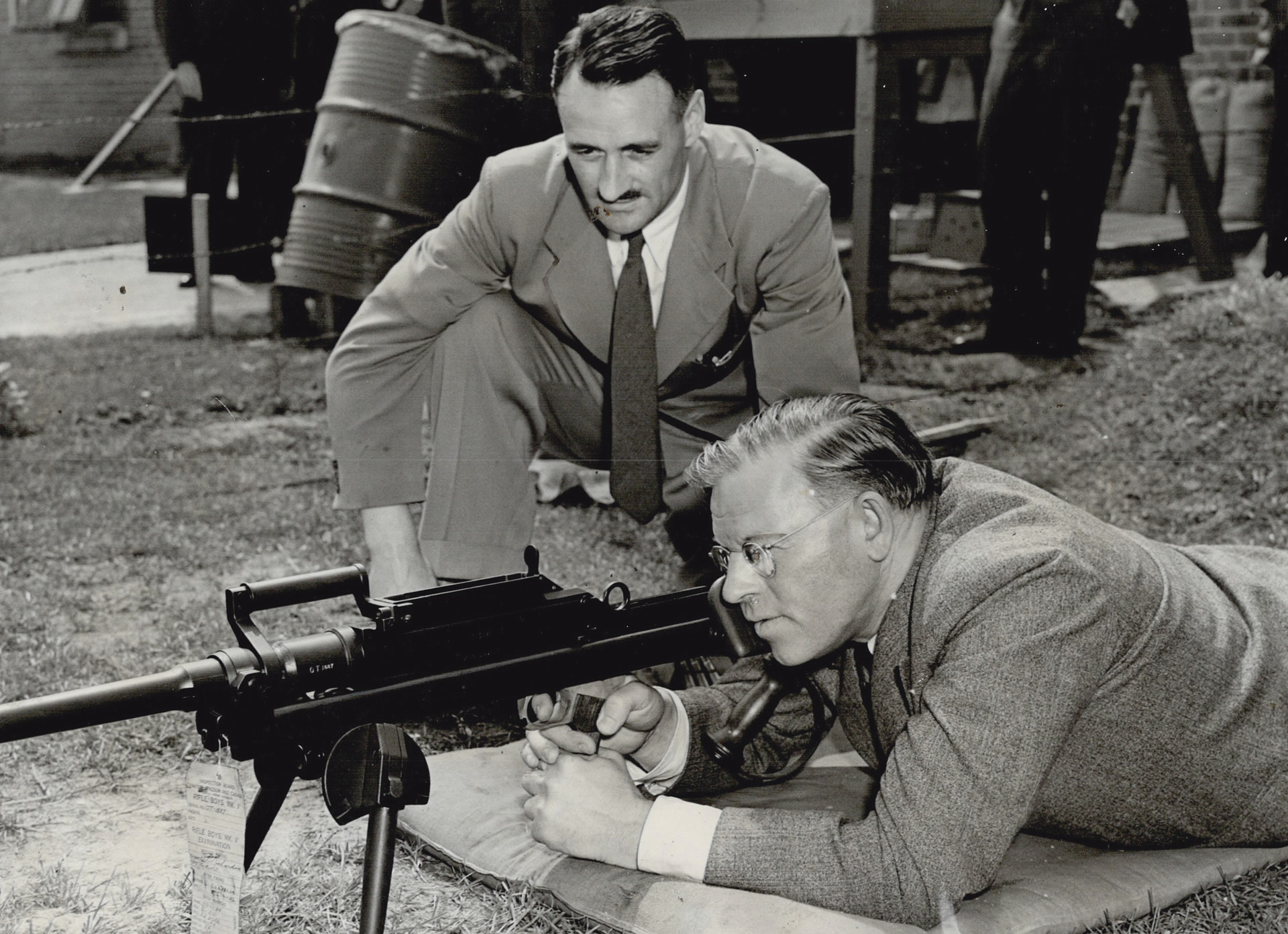
Homuth firing a gun on the range of the Small Arms plant in Long Branch, 1942

Karl Kenneth Homuth (December 12, 1893 – March 15, 1951) was a Canadian manufacturer and political figure in Ontario.

He was born in Preston, Ontario, the son of Otto Homuth and Charlotte McDowell, and was educated there and in Galt. He joined George Pattinson's textile manufacturing company in 1910. In 1917, he left that firm to work in his father's company, taking over its operation in 1928 after his father's death. In 1914, he married Minnie A. Rahn. Homuth served on the town council for Preston from 1917 to 1919. He died of complications of lung cancer in his Ottawa home on March 15, 1951.

Homuth's father was a Liberal and Karl defied him by running as a Labour candidate in the 1919 provincial election, was elected as the Member for Waterloo South and supported the United Farmers of Ontario-Labour government of E.C. Drury. He was one of the few Labour MLAs who survived the 1923 provincial election that routed Drury's government and was the only Labour MLA returned in the 1926 provincial election in which he broke with his colleagues in what by then was known as the Progressive Party over the issue of temperance.

Homuth supported Conservative Premier George Howard Ferguson's proposal to liberalise Ontario's prohibition laws during the 1926 election in which liquor policy was the principal issue (the Conservatives consequently did not run a candidate against him) and continued to support Ferguson's government after the election ultimately joining the Tories and successfully running for re-election as a Conservative in the 1929 provincial election before resigning in 1930 to unsuccessfully seek the federal seat of Waterloo North for the federal Conservatives. He went on to sit in House of Commons of Canada from 1938 to 1951 representing Waterloo South for the Conservative Party of Canada, then National Government and finally Progressive Conservative member.

Homuth died in office in 1951. The ensuing by-election returned Howie Meeker, a then-active National Hockey League player who would go on to have notable careers as a coach, manager and broadcaster.

== Electoral record ==
1949 Canadian federal election: Waterloo South
Party	Candidate	Votes	%	±%
Progressive Conservative	Karl Homuth	8,740	38.74	-7.68
Liberal	J. Mel Moffatt	8,397	37.22	+7.84
Co-operative Commonwealth	Paul Dufresne	5,425	24.04	-0.15
Total valid votes		22,562	100.0	
Progressive Conservative hold		Swing		-15.52
Source(s) "Waterloo South, Ontario (1867-1968)". History of Federal Ridings Since 1867. Library of Parliament.

1945 Canadian federal election: Waterloo South
Party	Candidate	Votes	%	±%
Progressive Conservative	Karl Homuth	9,201	46.42	-0.16
Liberal	Patrick Joseph Flynn	5,824	29.38	-14.33
Co-operative Commonwealth	Frank Alexander Ferguson	4,795	24.19	+14.48
Total valid votes		19,820	100.0	
Progressive Conservative hold		Swing		+7.09
Source(s) "Waterloo South, Ontario (1867-1968)". History of Federal Ridings Since 1867. Library of Parliament.

1940 Canadian federal election: Waterloo South
Party	Candidate	Votes	%	±%
National Government	Karl Homuth	7,432	46.58	-5.09
Liberal	Patrick Joseph Flynn	6,975	43.71	+18.93
Co-operative Commonwealth	Vardon Stanley Latsch	2,426	9.71	–
Total valid votes		15,956	100.0	
National Government hold		Swing		-12.01
Source(s) "Waterloo South, Ontario (1867-1968)". History of Federal Ridings Since 1867. Library of Parliament.

Canadian federal by-election, November 14, 1938: Waterloo South Death of Alexander Edwards
Party	Candidate	Votes	%	±%
Conservative	Karl Homuth	7,776	51.67	+11.52
Liberal	R. Kenneth Serviss	3,730	24.78	-14.63
Unknown	John Mitchell	3,544	23.55	–
Total valid votes		15,050	100.00	
Conservative hold		Swing		+13.08
Source(s) "Waterloo South, Ontario (1867-1968)". History of Federal Ridings Since 1867. Library of Parliament.
