= Theodore Isley =

Canadian politician (1912–2004)

Theodore Henry Isley (October 31, 1912 – September 19, 2004) was an Ontario farmer and politician. He served as on the Waterloo Township council, and then as deputy reeve before being elected to a term in the Ontario legislature as an Ontario Co-operative Commonwealth Federation MPP by winning the Waterloo South seat in the 1948 provincial election. He was defeated in the subsequent 1951 provincial election, in which the CCF fell to two seats from 21 in the previous election. In 1952, he was elected president of the Ontario CCF defeating William Horace Temple.

Isley also served as the last reeve of Waterloo Township from 1962 to 1971, when it was dissolved following the creation of the Regional Municipality of Waterloo.

== Electoral record ==
=== Federal ===
1958 Canadian federal election: Waterloo South
Party	Candidate	Votes	%	±%
Progressive Conservative	William Anderson	15,624	60.48	+13.10
Liberal	Marjorie Oliver	5,793	22.43	-7.74
Co-operative Commonwealth	Theodore Isley	4,415	17.09	+0.85
Total valid votes		25,832	100.0	
Progressive Conservative hold		Swing		+10.42
Source(s) "Waterloo South, Ontario (1867-1968)". History of Federal Ridings Since 1867. Library of Parliament.

1957 Canadian federal election: Waterloo South
Party	Candidate	Votes	%	±%
Progressive Conservative	William Anderson	11,699	47.38	+5.60
Liberal	Arthur White	7,450	30.17	-3.54
Co-operative Commonwealth	Theodore Isley	4,009	16.24	-2.39
Social Credit	George Hancock	1,532	6.20	+0.32
Total valid votes		24,690	100.0	
Progressive Conservative gain from Liberal		Swing		+4.57
Source(s) "Waterloo South, Ontario (1867-1968)". History of Federal Ridings Since 1867. Library of Parliament.
