= George Fraser Kerr =

Captain George Fraser Kerr VC MC & Bar MM
- Capt. George Fraser Kerr in uniform.
- Born: 8 June 1895; Deseronto, Ontario, Canada
- Died: 8 December 1929 (aged 34); Toronto, Ontario, Canada
- Burial place: Mount Pleasant Cemetery, Toronto (plot 14, section 36. Lot 6 – E 1/2)
- Military career
- Allegiance: Dominion of Canada
- Branch: Canadian Army
- Service years: 1914–1919 (CEF)
- Rank: Captain
- Unit: 3rd Battalion (Toronto Regiment), CEF
- Conflicts: First World War: Western Front; Battle of Mont Sorrel; Battle of Amiens; Battle of Drocourt-Quéant Line; Battle of Canal du Nord
- Awards: Victoria Cross; Military Cross & Bar; Military Medal
- Other work: Metal Supplier

George Fraser Kerr VC, MC & Bar, MM, (8 June 1895 – 8 December 1929) was a soldier in the Canadian Expeditionary Force during the First World War. He was a recipient of the Victoria Cross, the highest military award for gallantry in the face of the enemy given to British and Commonwealth forces. He had been awarded the Military Medal and the Military Cross (and bar) for actions earlier in the war.

== Early life ==
George Fraser Kerr was born on 8 June 1895 in Deseronto in Ontario, to John Kerr, a storekeeper, and Isabell (née Fraser). The family moved to Toronto when Kerr was eight years old. After completing his education, he began working at a bank.

== First World War ==
In September 1914, following the outbreak of the First World War, Kerr enlisted in the 3rd (Toronto) Battalion of the Canadian Expeditionary Force (CEF). He embarked for Britain the next month and, with his battalion part of 1st Canadian Infantry Brigade, 1st Canadian Division, arrived in France on the Western Front in February 1915 after a period of training. By this stage, he had been promoted to corporal.

Kerr served in the Ypres sector with his battalion for much of 1916, and in June, was awarded the Military Medal (MM) for his actions during the Battle of Mont Sorrel. He was wounded the next month and the severity of his injuries warranted him being sent to England for medical treatment. He did not return to his unit for several months but when he did, it was as a lieutenant; he had been commissioned while serving with a reserve battalion back in England.

On 8 August 1918, the opening day of the Battle of Amiens, Kerr led a platoon of infantry in closing a gap in the Allied line and captured a battery of field guns. Advancing further forward, he and his men destroyed several machine-gun posts before reaching their objective for the day. Wounded, he remained with his platoon for two days before seeking medical treatment. He was later awarded the Military Cross (MC) for his endeavours. Learning of the forthcoming offensive on the Drocourt-Quéant Line, for which his battalion was scheduled to participate on 2 September 1918, he discharged himself from medical care and re-joined his platoon. He was again instrumental in attack, and his leadership was recognised with an award of a bar to his MC.

On 27 September 1918, Kerr was commanding a support company at Bourlon Wood, during the Battle of the Canal du Nord (a part of Canada's Hundred Days). The advance of the 2nd and 3rd Battalions of the 1st Brigade was affected by heavy machine-gun fire from a nearby railway embankment. Under his command, Kerr's company dealt with the holdup. He later made a solo foray, ahead of his company, during which four machine-guns were destroyed and 31 prisoners taken. For this, Kerr was awarded the Victoria Cross (VC) for his actions. The citation for his VC read:

For most conspicuous bravery during the Bourlon Wood operations on 27th September 1918, when in command of the left support company in attack. He handled his company with great skill and gave timely support when outflanking a machine-gun which was impeding the advance. Later, near the Arras-Cambrai Road, the advance was again held up by a strong point. Lieut. Kerr, far in advance of his company, he rushed the strong point single-handed and captured four machine-guns and thirty-one prisoners. His valour throughout this engagement was an inspiring example to all.

— London Gazette

Kerr's VC was gazetted on 4 January 1919, which was a month after his MC was announced in the London Gazette. The bar to his MC was gazetted on 1 February 1919. He was presented with his VC, as well as his MC and bar, in a ceremony at Buckingham Palace on 20 May 1919.

== Later life ==
After being discharged from the CEF in July 1919, Kerr returned to Toronto and began working for a company supplying metals. He was involved in the local militia, serving in the Toronto Regiment in which he was a captain. He died on 8 December 1929 at his home in Toronto of carbon monoxide poisoning. Survived by his wife and daughter, he was buried at Toronto's Mount Pleasant Cemetery with military honours.

== Medals and legacy ==
Kerr's VC is displayed at the Canadian War Museum in Ottawa, along with his MM, MC and bar, and his campaign medals: the British War Medal, and Victory Medal. There are at least two memorials in his memory; a plaque in Valour Place, Cambridge, in Ontario, and one erected by the Royal Canadian Legion at Centennial Park, in his hometown of Deseronto.

== See ==
- List of Canadian Victoria Cross recipients
