= Bob Hodges (ice hockey) =

Canadian ice hockey official

- Born: August 16, 1944 (age 81) Hespeler, Ontario, Canada
- Position: Linesman
- Playing career: 1972–1998

Bob Hodges (born August 16, 1944) is a Canadian retired National Hockey League linesman.

== Early life ==
Hodges was born in Hespeler, Ontario, in 1944. He won two Ontario championships as a goaltender, for the Hespeler Juveniles in 1963 and the Hespeler Shamrocks in 1964.

== Career ==
Hodges began his officiating career in 1972 and worked until 1998. During his career (in which he wore a helmet from the late-1980s to his retirement), he had officiated three Stanley Cup finals, 1,701 regular season games, 157 playoff games, and three All-Star games. From the 1994–95 NHL season until his retirement, he wore uniform number 37.

== Awards and honors ==
Hodges was inducted into the Cambridge Sports Hall of Fame in 1999, Waterloo Region Hall of Fame in 2008, and Stairway of Excellence at Galt Collegiate Institute and Vocational School in 2011.

== Personal life ==
Hodges is married to his wife Gail. They have two children.
