= Galt Collegiate Institute and Vocational School =

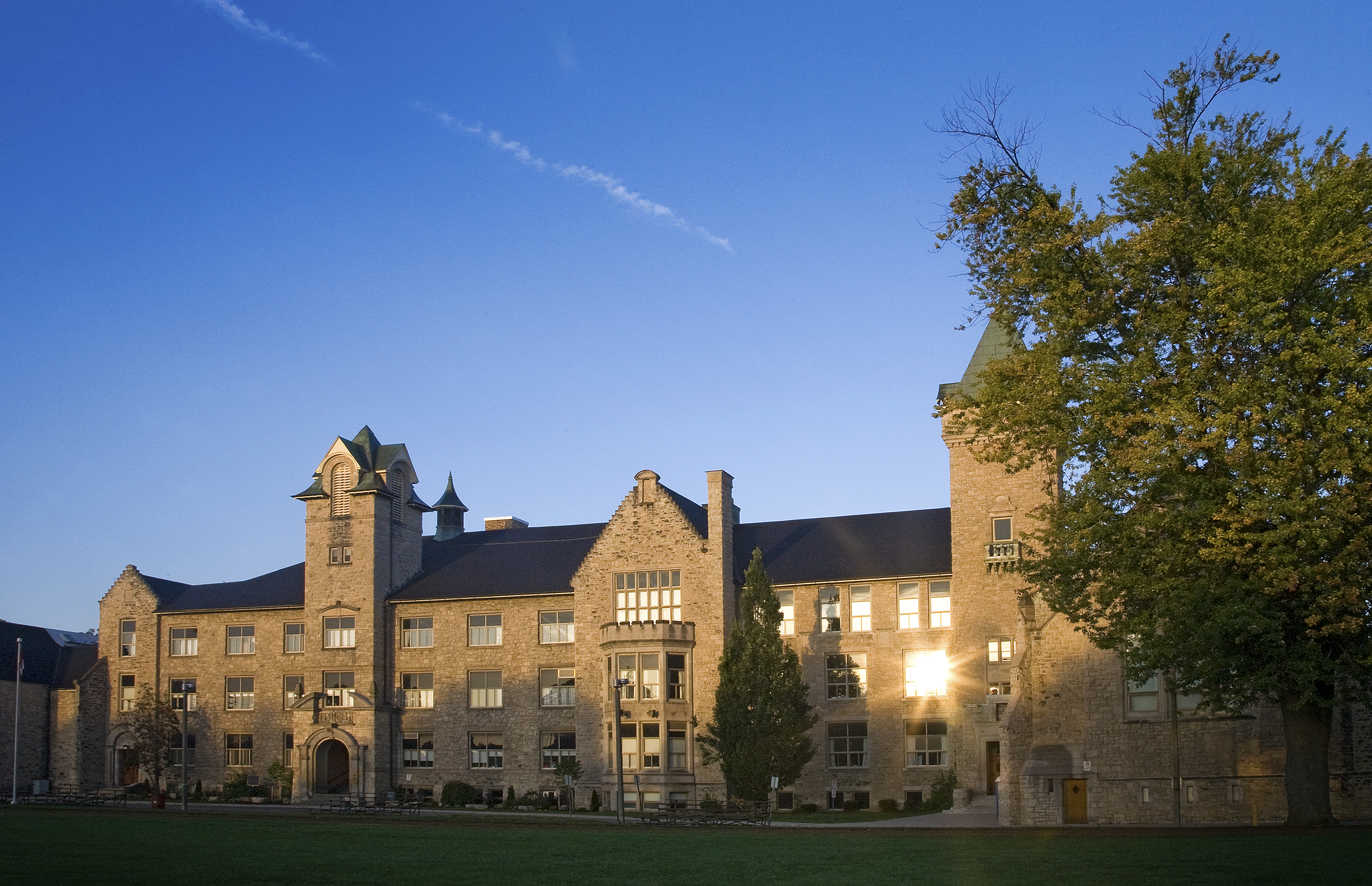

Location
- 200 Water St. N Cambridge, Ontario, N1R 6V2; Canada; 43°22′07″N 80°19′07″W

Information
- School type: High school
- Motto: Semper Paratus (Always Prepared)
- Founded: 1852; 174 years ago
- School board: Waterloo Region District School Board
- Principal: Blair, Adrian https://gci.wrdsb.ca/about/staff-list/
- Grades: 9–12
- Enrollment: 975 (November 2017)
- Language: English
- Area: Downtown / North Galt
- Colours: Red, Blue and yellow
- Mascot: Ghost
- Website: gci.wrdsb.ca

Galt Collegiate Institute and Vocational School (GCI) is one of sixteen secondary schools in the Waterloo Region District School Board, located in Cambridge, Waterloo, and Kitchener, Ontario, Canada.

Founded in 1852, GCI is one of the oldest continually operating secondary schools in Ontario, and has been recognized as a historical landmark by Heritage Cambridge and by the Ontario Archaeological and Historic Sites Board. In 2002, GCI celebrated its 150th anniversary.

GCI has a student body of about 1000. GCI is also home to the French Immersion and ESL programs.

== History ==
=== Beginnings ===
The Galt Grammar School officially opened on February 2, 1852, and classes were initially held in the upper storey room of the old township hall (located near the corner of present-day Cambridge Street and Park Hill Road in Cambridge, Ontario). Eight boys made up the first group of students, and were taught English and Classics by Michael C. Howe, a scholar from Trinity College in Dublin, Ireland. However, Howe's term as headmaster was short-lived. Although by all accounts his scholarship in Classics was impressive, Howe's successes were offset by his eccentricities. He was not an engaging instructor, and typically spent the school day seated at his desk reading a newspaper and inhaling snuff while his students taught made the effort to teach themselves. According to his students, Howe was only energetic when it came to discipline; he frequently used the strap to enforce obedience for the slightest infraction. Rising criticisms of Howe's pedagogy led to his resignation within a year.

William Tassie, headmaster of GCI from 1853 to 1881.

=== The Tassie era, 1853–1881 ===
Howe was succeeded in 1853 by William Tassie. While Tassie was headmaster, the Galt Grammar School achieved widespread recognition as one of the finest grammar schools in North America. Enrollment at the school reached between 250 and 300 boys within a decade, and roughly 80 percent of attendees were from elsewhere in Canada, the United States, England, and the West Indies. To accommodate the growing number of boys attending the school, a one-room schoolhouse was built on the present site from land donated by the Dickson family in 1853. Additions were made to the original building as required, and by 1870 the school's layout resembled a two-storey stone cross. A boarding home system was also adopted to accommodate students attending from outside of Galt.

Tassie was described by his students as a gentleman "of the old school." Furthermore, he was strict, dignified, and somewhat cold towards his pupils. But Tassie was also highly respected by his students for his successes for furthering higher education in Upper Canada. He was awarded an honorary LLD from Queen's University in 1871. Due largely to Tassie's contribution to the school, the Galt Grammar School became a Collegiate Institute in 1872.

In his later years as headmaster, Tassie was increasingly pressured to conform to educational reforms made in Upper Canada. Provincial examinations were introduced in 1876 and emphasized practical rather than classical education. Tassie stubbornly refused to change his teaching methods, based principally on rote memorization, and consequently his students consistently failed to meet provincial standards. By 1881 the enrollment had fallen to 50 boys, and Tassie faced increased criticism that he ultimately resigned that year along with his entire staff of teachers.

=== Galt Collegiate Institute Girls' School, 1872–1881 ===
Sarah Crawford was the first woman to become a member of the teaching staff at the Galt Grammar School, and taught French to the boys from 1870 to 1877. Girls, however, were not admitted on an equal basis to GCI until a decade later. Tassie was pressured to adopt co-education and allow girls into his school to receive the same level of education as the boys, but refused. As a compromise, he established the separate Girls' School, which officially opened on April 15, 1872, in the former Wesleyan Chapel on North Street. The school was overseen by a lady principal, and attendance rose to about 40 girls after it was organized. When Tassie resigned in April 1881, girls were admitted attendance at GCI with the boys and the building was sold to The Crown for $750.00 and became the Galt Armoury until about 1914.

=== Bryant and Carscadden years, 1881–1914 ===
Staff and students of GCI in 1892.

Tassie was succeeded by John E. Bryant, who was tasked to hire a completely new teaching staff and revive GCI's prestige while embracing educational reform. The separate girls' school was closed and co-education adopted in 1881. The boarding house system was also abolished. During Bryant's administration, a literary and musical society was formed, considered the first known student organization at the school. At the time, GCI offered English, Classics, Mathematics, Modern Languages, and Science. Soon Bryant became headmaster, a Commercial Department was organized with W. G. Brown as its head, as well as an Art Department with Mrs. Henry Miller as teacher of drawing and painting. Bryant encouraged sports, believing that they provided "the antidote for mischief present in the composition of every true boy," and organized the GCI Football Club. Bryant, however, resigned as headmaster in 1884 when became increasingly deaf, and was succeeded by his assistant principal, Thomas Carscadden.

While Carscadden was principal, GCI grew in enrollment and required additional teaching space. Renovations on the building were conducted between 1905 and when the school re-opened in September 1906. The corners of the original cross structure were filled and a third storey added, which made up most of the midsection of the present building. In addition, a school cadet corps was organized in 1899, which over time became a significant part of the school's activities until the 1970s, and which eventually became the present-day 21 Royal Highland Fusiliers of Canada Army Cadets.

George Fraser Kerr, GCI alumnus, awarded the Victoria Cross in 1918.

After thirty years as principal, Carscadden retired in the summer of 1914, but remained to teach English for another ten years. He was recognized for his excellence in teaching and as a school administrator by receiving an honorary LLD from the University of Toronto in 1925.

=== World War I era, 1914–1918 ===
Arthur Presland Gundry succeeded Carscadden as principal of GCI in 1914. Initially, Gundry and the local school board had plans to organize a vocational education program at GCI, but the onset of World War I brought those plans to a stop. Instead, GCI would focus much of its attention towards the war effort. Staff and students were heavily involved in fundraising activities to support Canadian soldiers fighting overseas. They also sent Christmas gift boxes to alumni in the Canadian army. Meanwhile, efforts were made to instill a devotion to Canada and the British Empire that would encourage enlistment from GCI's graduates. By the end of World War I, at least 348 former pupils and teachers of GCI had enlisted, and 48 of those had died while serving overseas. A marble memorial tablet was erected on the wall of the school's main corridor and unveiled on June 4, 1921.

Among the military honours awarded to GCI's alumni who served during World War I was a Victoria Cross, the highest award for gallantry awarded in the British army, which was awarded to George Fraser Kerr for a daring raid conducted in broad daylight at Canal-du-Nord during the Hundred Days Offensive.

GCI shortly after extensive additions in 1925.

Household Science Class at GCI, June 1926.

Drafting class at GCI, June 1926.

=== The interwar years, 1919–1939 ===
Shortly after the end of World War I, plans to organize a vocational program at GCI were renewed. To accommodate the new program, additions were required to the building. These new additions would eventually cost about $365,000, and would double the size of the school building. The plans included an auditorium, known as Tassie Hall that would seat 800; a large gymnasium for boys and a smaller gymnasium below for girls; machine shop and woodworking shop classrooms; electrical rooms; drafting room; cookery room; commercial rooms; dress-making rooms; millinery rooms; and a model suite. The corner stone for the addition was laid by the Hon. Henry John Cody, a former student, on August 7, 1923. By August 1925, renovations were complete and equipment paid. The extension was built in the Scottish Baronial style of architecture. Principal Gundry, who increasingly suffered from ill health while principal at GCI, died on September 27, 1925, leaving a legacy of vocational education at the school. In addition, the school began offering vocational evening classes.

During this period, increasing attention was paid to organizing theatre productions in the newly constructed Tassie Hall. In 1925, the Galt Staff Players Club was organized and performed its first play, Bayard Veiller's The Thirteenth Chair in February 1925. The Staff Players Club would go on to compete in regional and provincial drama festivals, and would eventually become known as the Galt Little Theatre (present-day Cambridge Community Players). Students likewise produced their own plays, starting with Stop Thief in 1926.

Meanwhile, more student activities and student organizations began to emerge. By this period, the school had soccer, hockey, football, rugby, and basketball teams for boys, and basketball and softball teams for girls. A student publication known as Specula Galtonia, the forerunner of the school's present-day yearbooks, began to be produced for a time until the Great Depression. A school captaincy was set up due to the generosity of Dr. Thomas Porter, a former student, and was followed by a girl captaincy shortly after.

The Great Depression ushered in a period of financial strain on education in Ontario. In 1934 the Ontario Legislature decreed that municipalities of more than 1200 inhabitants should pay the full cost of secondary education rather than spread the cost over the entire county. Preston decided to pay for the education of students from their own municipality, and withdrew 175 pupils from GCI with the founding of Preston High School. Consequently, the staff at GCI was reduced and some shop classes closed for a brief period of time.

The machine shop classroom at GCI, 1924, which was used for the training of Engine Room Artificers and Air Mechanics during World War II.

=== World War II era, 1939–1945 ===
When World War II broke out in 1939, the staff and students of GCI became immediately and vigorously involved in the war effort. The school raised about between $1000 and $1400 by means of various activities, including proceeds from bake sales, plays, concerts, and cash donations from pupils, all of which was donated towards relief organizations. Not a single penny was spent elsewhere. The school also offered its machine shop classroom for the training of Engine Room Artificers by the Royal Canadian Navy (RCN) and for the training of air mechanics of the Galt Aircraft School. Both programs were vital to providing the Canadian Navy and Air Force with enough skilled mechanics to properly maintain engines and machines.

By the end of the war, about 790 alumni from GCI had enlisted for active service. The majority served in Europe or on the Atlantic with the RCN, but some others also served in Asia. A significant proportion of GCI alumni served with the local Highland Light Infantry of Canada. Seventy-eight men from GCI ultimately lost their lives, and their names were later added to the memorial tablet in the main corridor.

== Awards and scholarships ==
Students at GCI are eligible to be recipients of a wide variety of awards and scholarships from generous donors from alumni and the community. In 2018, 55 awards and scholarships totaling $26,175 were awarded to graduating students, including:

Award name	Description	Amount (2018)
Governor General's Medal	In recognition of the highest academic standing in a combination of all Grade 11 and 12 courses. Donated by the Governor General of Canada.	Academic Medal
Joseph S. Stauffer Scholarship	For highest academic standing. Donated by the Waterloo District School Board.	$2000.00
Sunrise Rotary Award	To a Cambridge high school student who demonstrates a combination of academic merit and exemplary humanitarian service.	$1500.00
Chu-Chong and Shephine Wang Award for Math and Science	For highest average of the top four Grade 12 university level Math and Science courses.	US$1000.00
Dr. Thomas Carscadden English Award	For proficiency in English and pursuing studies at college or university. Donated in memory of Dr. Thomas Carscadden.	$1000.00
Dr. Thomas Carscadden History Award	For proficiency in History and pursuing studies at college or university. Donated in memory of Dr. Thomas Carscadden.	$1000.00
Harold W. Lee Scholarship	For a deserving graduating student enrolled in a post-secondary education program. Donated by Harold Lee Family and Cello Products.	$1000.00
Kiwanis Club of Cambridge Scholarship	Awarded to a grade 12 student accepted to university or college who is described as kind, compassionate and hardworking. Donated by the Kiwanis Club of Cambridge.	$1000.00
Second General Proficiency Award	Second highest academic standing. Donated by The Hood Scholarship and Toyota.	$750.00
150th Reunion Scholarship	For a deserving student who has displayed perseverance, determination and success. Donated by G.C.I. alumni.	$500.00
Cambridge Sports Hall of Fame Scholarship	For a high school athlete who demonstrates both athletic and academic success and leadership. Donated by Cambridge Insurance.	$500.00
Canadian Association of Realtors Urban Studies Award	For proficiency in Geography with an interest in urban issues or civil engineering. Donated by the Real Estate Board of Cambridge.	$500.00
Duncan Engineering Award	For proficiency in Mathematics, Physics and Technical Design Engineering. Donated by the estate of Kathleen Duncan.	$500.00
Frank Ferguson English Award	For proficiency in senior English. Donated by the Frank Ferguson Foundation.	$500.00
George Szczepski Mathematics Award	For overall proficiency in Advanced Functions, and Calculus and Vectors. Donated by George Szczepski.	$500.00
IMAX C. Gordon Clarke Memorial Science Award	For proficiency and contribution in the Sciences particularly in Chemistry. Donated by IMAX Systems Corp.	$500.00
IODE Bursary	For a deserving student with future promise. Donated by the IODE Preston Chapter.	$500.00
Lois Charlton-Hutton Award	Given to a student who plans to pursue post-secondary studies, and who has been a well-rounded student at GCI. The recipient has achieved a high level of academic performance, has participated in athletics, and has made a contribution to the spirit of GCI.	$500.00
Nadarajah Family Award	For a deserving student who has exemplary character, excelled in academics and demonstrated leadership in school and the community. Donated by the Nadarajah Family.	$500.00
Optimist Club of West Cambridge Technical Studies Award	For proficiency in Technological Studies and in full-time technical employment or enrolled in a post-secondary program. Donated by the Optimist Club of West Cambridge.	$500.00
OSSTF Teaching Promise Award	For outstanding enthusiasm, patience, leadership and love of learning. Donated by Ontario Secondary School Teachers Federation (District 24).	$500.00
R. L. Petersen Business Scholarship	For proficiency in senior Business courses and continuing their education in a Business program. Donated as a scholarship fund within the Cambridge and North Dumfries Community.	$500.00
Rotary Academic Award	Awarded to a student with initiative, enthusiasm and committed to their future education. Donated by The Rotary Club of Cambridge.	$500.00
Rotary Vocational Award	For proficiency in Business Studies with an interest in continuing in this area.	$500.00
Slater Award for English	For outstanding contribution and scholastic success in English. Donated by the Slater Family in memory of Edna A. Slater.	$500.00
Slater Award for History	For outstanding contribution and scholastic success in senior History. Donated by the Slater Family in memory of Ernest F. Slater.	$500.00
Slater Award for Mathematics	For outstanding contribution and scholastic success in Mathematics. Donated by the Slater Family in memory of Dorothy L. Slater.	$500.00
Third General Proficiency Award	Third highest academic standing. Donated by the estate of William Bishop.	$500.00
Arthur White Scholarship	Awarded to one Cambridge High School student determined to be the best athlete with the highest academic standing. Donated by the Arthur White Scholarship Fund.	$400.00
Anne Lawrence Language Award	For achievement in Languages and shows leadership and teamwork. Donated by the estate of the Lawrence Family.	$350.00
The Eleanor Wilson Award	For a female student who displays a love of learning, determination and an interest in the world around her. Donated by the family of Eleanor Wilson.	$300.00
GCI & VS First Hundred Years Scholarship	For a deserving student in recognition of achievement and promise of future success. Donated by G.C.I. former students.	$300.00
Janet W. Carter Language Award	For proficiency in the study of languages and commitment to learning. Donated by the Janet W. Carter Scholarship Fund.	$300.00
Cambridge Highland Lions Club Achievement Award	For most improved student in the graduating year.	$250.00
Cooperative Education Science Award	For proficiency in Science and Cooperative Education. Donated by Frances Harrington Grand River Physiotherapy.	$250.00
R. S. Hamilton Science Award	For proficiency in Science and pursuing studies in this discipline. Donated by the estate of R. S. Hamilton.	$250.00
Bernice Adams Memorial Scholarship	For contribution to Arts, Design, Media and Culture. Donated by The Cambridge Centre for the Arts.	$200.00
Canadian Federation of University Women's Award	For an outstanding female student who has achieved academic excellence, has participated in extra-curricular programs and is attending university. Donated by the Canadian Federation of University Women of Cambridge.	$200.00
The Catherine McIntosh English Award	For proficiency at Grade 12 college level English, leadership and promise of future success.	$200.00
Clarence Bickle Award	For proficiency and contributions to GCI. Donated by the estate of Clarence Bickle.	$200.00
Dumfries Mutual Music Award	Given to a graduating student who has demonstrated exceptional musical talent and made an outstanding contribution to the GCI Music Department. Donated by The Dumfries Mutual Insurance Company.	$200.00
The Galt Collegiate Staff Players Award	Given by the Galt Collegiate Institute teaching staff to a graduating student who is looking to pursue valuable post-secondary opportunities. The recipient of this award is well-rounded, empathetic and personable, while demonstrating exemplary work ethic—all qualities that are valued by GCI teaching staff.	$200.00
Gerry Schell Memorial Cooperative Education Award	For proficiency in Cooperative Education and a spirit of contribution to school and/or community. Donated in memory of Mr. Gerry Schell.	$200.00
Hilliard Wholton Award	For proficiency in university level subjects. Donated by Gore Mutual Insurance Company.	$200.00
Principal's Leadership Award	For a student of good standing who displays promise for the future. Donated by Charles Wilson.	$175.00
Fred Carter Science Award	For contribution in Physics and pursuing post-secondary education. Donated by Mr. Fred Carter.	$150.00
James C. Buchan Art Award	For proficiency in Art. Donated in memory of James C. Buchan.	$150.00
Marion Hulet History Award	For proficiency in senior level History courses.	$150.00
Optimist Club of West Cambridge Leadership Award	For proficiency and contributions to GCI. Donated by the Optimist Club of West Cambridge.	$150.00
R. A. Catton Mathematics Award	For achievement in Grade 11 and 12 college level Mathematics. Donated by R. A. Catton and G.C.I. Math Department.	$125.00
Sharp Bus Lines Scholarship	Awarded to a student to further their education and experience in the field of skilled trades.	$125.00
Waterloo County School Bus Operators’ Award	For academic and personal achievement. Donated by Waterloo County School Bus Operators’ Association.	$125.00
George Beaumont Business Award	For proficiency in Accounting. Donated by the estate of George Beaumont.	$100.00
Cambridge Industrial Training Committee Award	For proficiency in a senior course in Technological Studies. Donated by Cambridge Industrial Committee.	$100.00
East Indian Ladies Club Award	For proficiency in academics and leadership in school activities.	$100.00

=== Rhodes Scholarships ===
At least two GCI alumni are known to have received Rhodes Scholarships. Richard Guisso, while attending St. Michael's College at the University of Toronto for a major in history, was awarded a Rhodes Scholarship for 1966. More recently, a Rhodes Scholarship for 2012 was awarded to Steven Wang, a graduate from University of Toronto's Trinity College where he studied international relations followed by some time abroad studying conflict and peace-building.

== Notable alumni ==
In 2003, a Stairway of Excellence was created at GCI to recognize the accomplishments of alumni who excelled in his or her chosen field. A new inductee is introduced every year during commencement ceremonies. Since 2003, 57 former students have been inducted into the Stairway, including:

- Sir Adam Beck (2012)
- Alan C. Cairns (2003)
- Derrick Campbell (2004)
- Graeme Ferguson (2003)
- Peter Gzowski (2003)
- Roberta Carter Harrison (2006)
- Norman Himes (2009)
- Bob Hodges (2011)
- George Fraser Kerr (2003), awarded the Victoria Cross, the highest decoration for valour in the British army, for gallantry in World War I.
- Robert Kerr (2003)
- Wolf Koenig (2005)
- Ian Leggatt (2007)
- George F. MacDonald (2003)
- Ken "Jiggs" McDonald (2003)
- Harold Oaks (2007)
- Frank Panabaker (2008)
- Jane Philpott (2008)
- Donald M. Shaver (2003)
- Sylvia Spring (2003)

== See also ==
- Education in Ontario
- List of secondary schools in Ontario
