= 1938 Conservative Party of Ontario leadership election =

Canadian election

- Date: December 9, 1938
- Convention: Royal York Hotel, Toronto
- Resigning leader: Earl Rowe
- Won by: George Drew
- Ballots: 1
- Candidates: 4

A Conservative Party of Ontario leadership election (formally the convention of the Liberal-Conservative Association of Ontario) was on December 9, 1938, at the Royal York Hotel in Toronto. It was held to replace retiring Conservative leader Earl Rowe, who had resigned after his party lost the 1937 provincial election to Mitchell Hepburn's Liberals.

Colonel George A. Drew was considered the front-runner leading into the convention and stared down a challenge by "old guard" candidate Earl Lawson, a former MP, who had declared his candidacy the week prior to the convention. Drew's candidacy was considered controversial by some Conservatives as he had quit the party and run as an Independent Conservative in the 1937 provincial election in protest of the pro-labour stance of leader Earl Rowe during the Ontario government's conflict with the Congress of Industrial Organizations in Oshawa.

First ballot:

- DREW, George 796
- LAWSON, Earl 413
- HEIGHINGTON, Wilfrid 41
- RAWSON, Norman 22

== See also ==
- Progressive Conservative Party of Ontario leadership conventions
