= Hurdman =

Hurdman may refer to:

- Arthur Hurdman, English footballer
- George Charles Hurdman (born 1870), Ontario lumber merchant and political figure
- Hurdman station, light rail station in Ottawa, Canada
- William H. Hurdman (born 1818), Canadian entrepreneur and community leader
