= Progressive Conservative Party of Ontario leadership elections =

This page lists the results of leadership elections within the Progressive Conservative Party of Ontario (known as the Conservative Party of Ontario before 1942).

Before 1920, leaders of the Conservative Party were usually chosen by caucus. In 1914, William Hearst was selected at a meeting of the province's executive council (or cabinet) as James Whitney, the previous leader, had died while holding the office of Premier of Ontario.

All of the party's leadership races before 1990 were determined by delegated conventions. The leadership races of 1990, 2002 and 2004 were determined by a weighted vote of all party members, with each constituency contributing an equal number of "votes" to the total. The 1990 race was decided in one round, while the 2002 race took two. For the 2004 election, the party introduced a preferential balloting system, such that party members would only be required to vote one time.

== 1920 Conservative Party leadership convention ==
(Held on December 2, 1920.)

- Howard Ferguson won on first ballot
- Earl Lawson
- George Stewart Henry

(Note: The vote totals were not announced.)

When Ferguson resigned as Premier in 1930, he selected George Henry as his replacement. Henry was subsequently confirmed as party leader at a special Meeting on June 24, 1931.

== 1936 Conservative Party leadership convention ==
(Held on May 28, 1936 at the Royal York Hotel in Toronto.)

First ballot:

- Earl Rowe 782
- George A. Drew 480
- William James Stewart 157
- Leopold Macaulay 90
- Wilfrid Heighington 70
- Adam Acres 47
- Arthur Ellis 10

Second ballot:

- Earl Rowe 1,005
- George A. Drew 660

== 1938 Conservative Party leadership convention ==
(Held on December 9, 1938, at the Royal York Hotel in Toronto.)

- George A. Drew 796
- Earl Lawson 413
- Wilfrid Heighington 41
- Norman Rawson 22

== 1949 Progressive Conservative leadership convention ==
(Held on April 27, 1949.)

- Leslie Frost 842
- Leslie Blackwell 442
- Kelso Roberts 121
- Dana Porter 65

== 1961 Progressive Conservative leadership convention ==
(Held on October 25, 1961.)

Delegate support by ballot
| Candidate | 1st ballot | | 2nd ballot | | 3rd ballot | | 4th ballot | | 5th ballot | | 6th ballot | |
|---|---|---|---|---|---|---|---|---|---|---|---|---|
| Kelso Roberts | 352 | 20.6 | 385 | 22.8 | 380 | 22.5 | 419 | 25.2 | 479 | 28.8 | 633 | 39.3 |
| John Robarts | 345 | 20.2 | 423 | 25.0 | 498 | 29.5 | 533 | 32.0 | 746 | 44.9 | 976 | 60.7 |
| Robert Macaulay | 339 | 19.8 | 363 | 21.5 | 372 | 22.1 | 377 | 22.6 | 438 | 26.3 | | |
| James Allan | 332 | 19.4 | 324 | 19.1 | 344 | 20.4 | 336 | 20.2 | | | | |
| A.W. Downer | 149 | 8.7 | 104 | 6.1 | 93 | 5.5 | | | | | | |
| Matthew Dymond | 148 | 8.7 | 93 | 5.5 | | | | | | | | |
| George Wardrope | 45 | 2.6 | | | | | | | | | | |
| Totals | 1,710 | 100.0 | 1,692 | 100.0 | 1,687 | 100.0 | 1,665 | 100.0 | 1,663 | 100.0 | 1,609 | 100.0 |

== 1971 Progressive Conservative leadership convention ==
(Held on February 12, 1971.)

Delegate support by ballot
| Candidate | 1st ballot (cancelled) | | 1st ballot | | 2nd ballot | | 3rd ballot | | 4th ballot | |
|---|---|---|---|---|---|---|---|---|---|---|
| Name | Votes cast | % | Votes cast | % | Votes cast | % | Votes cast | % | Votes cast | % |
| Bill Davis | 502 | 32.2 | 548 | 33.1 | 595 | 36.0 | 669 | 41.3 | 812 | 51.4 |
| Allan Lawrence | 379 | 24.3 | 431 | 26.0 | 498 | 30.1 | 606 | 37.4 | 768 | 48.6 |
| Darcy McKeough | 260 | 16.7 | 273 | 16.5 | 288 | 17.4 | 346 | 21.3 | Endorsed Davis | |
| Bob Welch | 252 | 16.2 | 270 | 16.3 | 271 | 16.4 | No endorsement | | | |
| Bert Lawrence | 154 | 9.9 | 128 | 7.7 | No endorsement | | | | | |
| Robert Pharand | 13 | 0.8 | 7 | 0.4 | No endorsement | | | | | |
| Total | 1,560 | 100.0 | 1,657 | 100.0 | 1,652 | 100.0 | 1,621 | 100.0 | 1,580 | 100.0 |

== January 1985 Progressive Conservative leadership convention ==
(Held in Toronto on January 26, 1985.)

Delegate support by ballot
| Candidate | 1st ballot | | 2nd ballot | | 3rd ballot | |
|---|---|---|---|---|---|---|
| Name | Votes cast | % | Votes cast | % | Votes cast | % |
| Frank Miller | 591 | 35.0 | 659 | 39.2 | 869 | 52.3 |
| Larry Grossman | 378 | 22.4 | 514 | 30.5 | 792 | 47.7 |
| Dennis Timbrell | 421 | 24.9 | 508 | 30.2 | | |
| Roy McMurtry | 300 | 17.8 | | | | |
| Total | 1,690 | 100.0 | 1,681 | 100.0 | 1,661 | 100.0 |

When eliminated, McMurtry and Timbrell supported Grossman

== November 1985 Progressive Conservative leadership convention ==
(Held on November 16, 1985.)

First ballot:

- Larry Grossman 752
- Dennis Timbrell 661
- Alan Pope 271

Second ballot:

- Larry Grossman 848
- Dennis Timbrell 829

== 1990 Progressive Conservative leadership convention ==
(Held on May 12, 1990.)

| Candidate | 1st ballot | |
|---|---|---|
| Name | Votes cast | % |
| Mike Harris | 7,175 | 55.2 |
| Dianne Cunningham | 5,825 | 44.8 |
| Total | 13,000 | 100.0 |

(the non-weighted vote totals were: Harris 8,661, Cunningham 7,189)

The 1990 vote was the first held on the basis of one member one vote with votes weighted so that each riding had equal weight.

== 2002 Progressive Conservative leadership convention ==
(Held on March 23, 2002.)

First ballot:

- Ernie Eves 4,257
- Jim Flaherty 3,031
- Tony Clement 1,354
- Elizabeth Witmer 1,197
- Chris Stockwell 448

(Note: After the first ballot, Clement and Witmer both withdrew from the contest and supported Ernie Eves. Their names remained on the ballot for at least a part of the second round, however.)

Second ballot:

- Ernie Eves 5,623
- Jim Flaherty 3,898
- Tony Clement 561
- Elizabeth Witmer 216

(It is not clear if the non-weighted vote totals were released to the public. 44188 party members voted on the first ballot, 34,608 on the second.)

== 2004 Progressive Conservative leadership convention ==
(Held on September 18, 2004.)

First ballot:

- John Tory 4,535.13 (45%)
- Jim Flaherty 3,274.92 (33%)
- Frank Klees 2,265.96 (22%)

5,039 electoral votes needed to win

(the non-weighted vote totals were Tory 12,132, Flaherty 7,951, Klees 5,240)

Second ballot:

- John Tory 5,390.86 (54%)
- Jim Flaherty 4,664.14 (46%)

5,028 electoral votes needed to win

(the non-weighted vote totals were Tory 18,037, Flaherty 14,353)

== 2009 Progressive Conservative Party of Ontario leadership convention ==
(Held on June 27, 2009, in Markham, Ontario)

First Ballot
| Candidate | Weighted Votes (sum of percentages in each riding) | Percentage |
|---|---|---|
| Tim Hudak | 3,511.873 | 33.9 |
| Frank Klees | 3,093.770 | 29.9 |
| Christine Elliott | 2,728.664 | 26.4 |
| Randy Hillier | 1,013.694 | 9.8 |
| Total | 10,348 | 100 |

Movement: Hillier eliminated and endorses Hudak; prior to balloting Hillier asked his supporters to make Hudak their second choice.

Second Ballot
| Candidate | Weighted Votes (sum of percentages in each riding) | Percentage | +/- |
|---|---|---|---|
| Tim Hudak | 4,128.570 | 39.95 | +6.0 |
| Frank Klees | 3,299.809 | 31.94 | +1.9 |
| Christine Elliott | 2,903.621 | 28.10 | +1.6 |
| Total | 10,332 | 100.0 | |

Does not include votes that were spoiled because no second choice was indicated.

Movement: Elliott eliminated

Third Ballot
| Candidate | Weighted Votes (sum of percentages in each riding) | Percentage | +/- |
|---|---|---|---|
| Tim Hudak | 5,606 | 54.25 | +14.3 |
| Frank Klees | 4,644 | 44.94 | +13.0 |
| Total | 10,332 | 100.0 | |

Does not include votes that were spoiled because no second or third choice was indicated.

== 2015 Progressive Conservative Party of Ontario leadership election ==
(Held in Toronto on May 27, 2015)

Ballot Count
| Candidate | Weighted Votes (sum of percentages in each riding) | Percentage |
|---|---|---|
| Patrick Brown | 6,543 | 61.8 |
| Christine Elliott | 4,040 | 38.2 |
| Total | 10,583 | 100 |

== 2018 Progressive Conservative Party of Ontario leadership election ==
(Held on March 10, 2018)

Called due to the resignation of party leader Patrick Brown on January 25, 2018 following allegations of sexual misconduct.

=== Results ===
= Eliminated from next round
= Winner

| Candidate | Ballot 1 | | Ballot 2 | | | | Ballot 3 | | | |
| Name | Votes | Points | Votes | +/- | Points | +/- | Votes | +/- | Points | +/- |
|---|---|---|---|---|---|---|---|---|---|---|
| Christine Elliott | 23,237; 36.28% | 4,187; 34.13% | 24,138; 37.99% | 901; 1.71% | 4,394; 35.82% | 207; 1.69% | 32,202; 51.74% | 8,064; 13.75% | 6,049; 49.38% | 1,655; 13.56% |
| Doug Ford | 20,363; 31.80% | 4,091; 33.35% | 27,812; 43.77% | 7,449; 11.97 | 5,652; 46.08% | 1,561; 12.73% | 30,041; 48.26% | 2,229; 4.49% | 6,202; 50.62% | 550; 4.54% |
| Caroline Mulroney | 11,099; 17.33% | 2,107; 17.18% | 11,595; 18.25% | 496; 0.92% | 2,221; 18.11% | 114; 0.93% | eliminated | | | |
| Tanya Granic Allen | 9,344; 14.596% | 1,882; 15.34% | eliminated | | | | | | | |
| TOTAL | 64,043 | 12,267 | 63,545 | -498 | 12,267 | 0 | 62,243 | -1,302 | 12,251 | -16 |

==== By Riding ====
Toronto
| Riding | Ballot 1 | | | | | Ballot 2 | | | | | | | | Ballot 3 | | | | | |
| Caucus/Candidate (Supported) | Allen | Elliott | Ford | Mulroney | Total | Elliott | | Ford | | Mulroney | | Total | | Elliott | | Ford | | Total | |
Toronto & York
| Beaches—East York | 7.40 (37) | 41.20 (206) | 31.40 (157) | 20.00 (100) | 100 (500) | 41.60 (208) | +0.40 (+2) | 38.00 (190) | +6.60 (+33) | 20.40 (102) | +0.40 (+2) | 100 (500) | (0) | 59.96 (292) | +18.36 (+84) | 40.04 (195) | +2.04 (+5) | 100 (487) | (-13) |
| Davenport | 10.90 (23) | 26.54 (56) | 45.02 (95) | 17.54 (37) | 100 (211) | 27.49 (58) | +0.95 (+2) | 54.98 (116) | +9.95 (+21) | 17.54 (37) | +0.00 (+0) | 100 (211) | (0) | 40.29 (83) | +12.80 (+25) | 59.71 (123) | +4.73 (+7) | 100 (206) | (-5) |
| Don Valley East; Candidate: Denzil Minnan-Wong (Mulroney) | 11.23 (42) | 37.97 (142) | 39.84 (149) | 10.96 (41) | 100 (374) | 39.04 (146) | +1.07 (+4) | 49.47 (185) | +9.63 (+36) | 11.50 (43) | +0.53 (+2) | 100 (374) | (0) | 46.47 (171) | +7.43 (+25) | 53.53 (197) | +4.07 (+12) | 100 (368) | (-6) |
| Don Valley West; Candidate: Jon Kieran (Mulroney) | 4.27 (57) | 45.43 (606) | 19.42 (259) | 30.89 (412) | 100 (1334) | 46.58 (620) | +1.16 (+14) | 22.16 (295) | +2.75 (+36) | 31.26 (416) | +0.37 (+4) | 100 (1331) | (-3) | 73.88 (939) | +27.30 (+319) | 26.12 (332) | +3.96 (+37) | 100 (1271) | (-60) |
| Eglinton—Lawrence | 4.53 (40) | 50.79 (449) | 17.99 (159) | 26.70 (236) | 100 (884) | 51.08 (451) | +0.28 (+2) | 21.63 (191) | +3.65 (+32) | 27.29 (241) | +0.60 (+5) | 100 (883) | (-1) | 74.26 (629) | +23.19 (+178) | 25.74 (218) | +4.11 (+27) | 100 (847) | (-36) |
| Parkdale—High Park | 14.31 (75) | 36.64 (192) | 26.15 (137) | 22.90 (120) | 100 (524) | 38.42 (199) | +1.78 (+7) | 38.22 (198) | +12.08 (+61) | 23.36 (121) | +0.46 (+1) | 100 (518) | (-6) | 58.30 (295) | +19.88 (+96) | 41.70 (211) | +3.48 (+13) | 100 (506) | (-12) |
| Spadina—Fort York | 4.66 (24) | 44.85 (231) | 24.27 (125) | 26.21 (135) | 100 (515) | 45.72 (235) | +0.87 (+4) | 27.63 (142) | +3.35 (+17) | 26.65 (137) | +0.44 (+2) | 100 (514) | (-1) | 67.73 (340) | +22.01 (+105) | 32.27 (162) | +4.65 (+20) | 100 (502) | (-12) |
| Toronto Centre | 7.30 (27) | 46.22 (171) | 18.92 (70) | 27.57 (102) | 100 (370) | 47.43 (175) | +1.21 (+4) | 24.39 (90) | +5.47 (+20) | 28.18 (104) | +0.62 (+2) | 100 (369) | (-1) | 72.30 (261) | +24.87 (+86) | 27.70 (100) | +3.31 (+10) | 100 (361) | (-8) |
| Toronto—Danforth | 6.47 (22) | 35.59 (121) | 27.65 (94) | 30.29 (103) | 100 (340) | 36.77 (125) | +1.18 (+4) | 32.65 (111) | +5.00 (+17) | 30.59 (104) | +0.29 (+1) | 100 (340) | (0) | 64.05 (212) | +27.28 (+87) | 35.95 (119) | +3.31 (+8) | 100 (331) | (-9) |
| Toronto—St. Paul's | 5.43 (46) | 43.09 (365) | 13.34 (113) | 38.14 (323) | 100 (847) | 44.48 (375) | +1.39 (+10) | 17.08 (144) | +3.74 (+31) | 38.43 (324) | +0.30 (+1) | 100 (843) | (-4) | 77.47 (605) | +32.98 (+230) | 22.54 (176) | +5.45 (+32) | 100 (781) | (-62) |
| University—Rosedale; Candidate: Gillian Smith (Mulroney) | 3.26 (31) | 43.85 (417) | 11.67 (111) | 41.22 (392) | 100 (951) | 44.95 (427) | +1.10 (+10) | 13.58 (129) | +1.91 (+18) | 41.47 (394) | +0.25 (+2) | 100 (950) | (-1) | 81.42 (732) | +36.48 (+305) | 18.58 (167) | +5.00 (+38) | 100 (899) | (-51) |
North York
| Don Valley North; Candidate: Vincent Ke (Ford) | 13.50 (91) | 20.62 (139) | 57.27 (386) | 8.61 (58) | 100 (674) | 21.34 (143) | +0.72 (+4) | 69.40 (465) | +12.13 (+79) | 9.25 (62) | +0.65 (+4) | 100 (670) | (-4) | 26.43 (176) | +5.08 (+33) | 73.57 (490) | +4.17 (+25) | 100 (666) | (-4) |
| Humber River—Black Creek | 13.21 (21) | 8.81 (14) | 68.55 (109) | 9.43 (15) | 100 (159) | 8.81 (14) | +0.00 (+0) | 81.13 (129) | +12.58 (+20) | 10.06 (16) | +0.63 (+1) | 100 (159) | (0) | 15.72 (25) | +6.92 (+11) | 84.28 (134) | +3.15 (+5) | 100 (159) | (0) |
| Willowdale; Candidate: Stan Cho (Mulroney) | 13.19 (65) | 26.57 (131) | 40.57 (200) | 19.68 (97) | 100 (493) | 28.51 (140) | +1.94 (+9) | 51.53 (253) | +10.96 (+53) | 19.96 (98) | +0.28 (+1) | 100 (491) | (-2) | 44.49 (214) | +15.98 (+74) | 55.51 (267) | +3.98 (+14) | 100 (481) | (-10) |
| York Centre; Candidate: Roman Baber (Elliott) | 7.57 (32) | 38.53 (163) | 39.48 (167) | 14.42 (61) | 100 (423) | 39.67 (167) | +1.13 (+4) | 45.84 (193) | +6.36 (+26) | 14.49 (61) | +0.07 (+0) | 100 (421) | (-2) | 50.85 (209) | +11.19 (+42) | 49.15 (202) | +3.31 (+9) | 100 (411) | (-10) |
| York South—Weston | 11.01 (23) | 22.01 (46) | 63.64 (133) | 3.35 (7) | 100 (209) | 23.67 (49) | +1.66 (+3) | 72.95 (151) | +9.31 (+18) | 3.38 (7) | +0.03 (+0) | 100 (207) | (-2) | 26.70 (55) | +3.03 (+6) | 73.30 (151) | +0.35 (+0) | 100 (206) | (-1) |
Etobicoke
| Etobicoke Centre | 12.25 (118) | 24.82 (239) | 51.51 (496) | 11.42 (110) | 100 (963) | 25.55 (244) | +0.73 (+5) | 62.20 (594) | +10.69 (+98) | 12.25 (117) | +0.83 (+7) | 100 (955) | (-8) | 34.33 (322) | +8.78 (+78) | 65.67 (616) | +3.47 (+22) | 100 (938) | (-17) |
| Etobicoke—Lakeshore; Candidate: Christine Hogarth (Elliott) | 11.83 (97) | 39.51 (324) | 34.27 (281) | 14.39 (118) | 100 (820) | 40.37 (331) | +0.85 (+7) | 44.15 (362) | +9.88 (+81) | 15.49 (127) | +1.10 (+9) | 100 (820) | (0) | 52.96 (430) | +12.59 (+99) | 47.04 (382) | +2.90 (+20) | 100 (812) | (-8) |
| Etobicoke North | 11.68 (55) | 9.34 (44) | 74.95 (353) | 4.03 (19) | 100 (471) | 10.62 (50) | +1.27 (+6) | 84.93 (400) | +9.98 (+47) | 4.46 (21) | +0.43 (+2) | 100 (471) | (0) | 13.59 (64) | +2.97 (+14) | 86.41 (407) | +1.49 (+7) | 100 (471) | (0) |
Scarborough
| Scarborough—Agincourt | 17.16 (64) | 21.45 (80) | 52.82 (197) | 8.58 (32) | 100 (373) | 22.13 (81) | +0.68 (+1) | 68.58 (251) | +15.76 (+54) | 9.29 (34) | +0.71 (+2) | 100 (366) | (-7) | 25.97 (94) | +3.84 (+13) | 74.03 (268) | +5.45 (+17) | 100 (362) | (-4) |
| Scarborough Centre | 14.10 (54) | 31.59 (121) | 44.65 (171) | 9.66 (37) | 100 (383) | 33.78 (127) | +2.18 (+6) | 56.12 (211) | +11.47 (+40) | 10.11 (38) | +0.45 (+1) | 100 (376) | (-7) | 40.27 (149) | +6.49 (+22) | 59.73 (221) | +3.61 (+10) | 100 (370) | (-6) |
| Scarborough—Guildwood | 9.84 (36) | 23.22 (85) | 56.01 (205) | 10.93 (40) | 100 (366) | 24.73 (90) | +1.50 (+5) | 63.74 (232) | +7.72 (+27) | 11.54 (42) | +0.61 (+2) | 100 (364) | (-2) | 32.22 (116) | +7.50 (+26) | 67.78 (244) | +4.04 (+12) | 100 (360) | (-4) |
| Scarborough North | 18.52 (40) | 16.67 (36) | 61.57 (133) | 3.24 (7) | 100 (216) | 16.67 (36) | +0.00 (+0) | 80.09 (173) | +18.52 (+40) | 3.24 (7) | +0.00 (+0) | 100 (216) | (0) | 18.69 (40) | +2.03 (+4) | 81.31 (174) | +1.22 (+1) | 100 (214) | (-2) |
| Scarborough—Rouge Park; MPP: Raymond Cho (Ford) | 18.27 (80) | 27.40 (120) | 33.33 (146) | 21.01 (92) | 100 (438) | 28.01 (121) | +0.61 (+1) | 49.77 (215) | +16.44 (+69) | 22.22 (96) | +1.22 (+4) | 100 (432) | (-6) | 44.84 (191) | +16.83 (+70) | 55.16 (235) | +5.40 (+20) | 100 (426) | (-6) |
| Scarborough Southwest | 10.45 (35) | 32.24 (108) | 44.48 (149) | 12.84 (43) | 100 (335) | 33.33 (111) | +1.09 (+3) | 52.85 (176) | +8.38 (+27) | 13.81 (46) | +0.98 (+3) | 100 (333) | (-2) | 42.42 (137) | +9.08 (+26) | 57.59 (186) | +4.73 (+10) | 100 (323) | (-10) |

905
| Riding | Ballot 1 | | | | | Ballot 2 | | | | | | | | Ballot 3 | | | | | |
| Caucus/Candidate (Supported) | Allen | Elliott | Ford | Mulroney | Total | Elliott | | Ford | | Mulroney | | Total | | Elliott | | Ford | | Total | |
Hamilton-Niagara
| Flamborough—Glanbrook; MP: David Sweet (Elliott); Candidate: Donna Skelly (Elliott) | 24.47 (160) | 33.49 (219) | 31.65 (207) | 10.40 (68) | 100 (654) | 38.46 (250) | +4.98 (+31) | 50.92 (331) | +19.27 (+124) | 10.62 (69) | +0.22 (+1) | 100 (650) | (-4) | 46.02 (295) | +7.56 (+45) | 53.98 (346) | +3.06 (+15) | 100 (641) | (-9) |
| Hamilton Centre | 16.94 (31) | 24.04 (44) | 47.00 (86) | 12.02 (22) | 100 (183) | 26.37 (48) | +2.33 (+4) | 60.44 (110) | +13.45 (+24) | 13.19 (24) | +1.17 (+2) | 100 (182) | (-1) | 34.62 (63) | +8.24 (+15) | 65.39 (119) | +4.95 (+9) | 100 (182) | (0) |
| Hamilton East—Stoney Creek | 15.48 (39) | 28.18 (71) | 44.05 (111) | 12.30 (31) | 100 (252) | 28.92 (72) | +0.74 (+1) | 58.23 (145) | +14.19 (+34) | 12.85 (32) | +0.55 (+1) | 100 (249) | (-3) | 37.35 (93) | +8.43 (+21) | 62.65 (156) | +4.42 (+11) | 100 (249) | (0) |
| Hamilton Mountain; Candidate: Esther Pauls (Elliott) | 17.07 (42) | 26.83 (66) | 46.75 (115) | 9.35 (23) | 100 (246) | 29.63 (72) | +2.80 (+6) | 60.08 (146) | +13.33 (+31) | 10.29 (25) | +0.94 (+2) | 100 (243) | (-3) | 36.93 (89) | +7.30 (+17) | 63.07 (152) | +2.99 (+6) | 100 (241) | (-2) |
| Hamilton West—Ancaster—Dundas; Candidate: Ben Levitt (Elliott) | 14.54 (105) | 43.77 (316) | 27.15 (196) | 14.54 (105) | 100 (722) | 46.05 (332) | +2.28 (+16) | 38.70 (279) | +11.55 (+83) | 15.26 (110) | +0.71 (+5) | 100 (721) | (-1) | 56.90 (404) | +10.85 (+72) | 43.10 (306) | +4.40 (+27) | 100 (710) | (-11) |
| Niagara Centre | 17.07 (85) | 26.51 (132) | 47.39 (236) | 9.04 (45) | 100 (498) | 28.78 (141) | +2.27 (+9) | 61.84 (303) | +14.45 (+67) | 9.39 (46) | +0.35 (+1) | 100 (490) | (-8) | 35.82 (173) | +7.04 (+32) | 64.18 (310) | +2.35 (+7) | 100 (483) | (-7) |
| Niagara Falls; MP: Rob Nicholson (Mulroney); Candidate: Chuck McShane (Elliott) | 10.02 (47) | 38.59 (181) | 31.56 (148) | 19.83 (93) | 100 (469) | 39.49 (184) | +0.89 (+3) | 40.13 (187) | +8.57 (+39) | 20.39 (95) | +0.56 (+2) | 100 (466) | (-3) | 56.62 (261) | +17.13 (+77) | 43.38 (200) | +3.26 (+13) | 100 (461) | (-5) |
| Niagara West; MPP: Sam Oosterhoff (Elliott); MP: Dean Allison (Elliott) | 29.33 (166) | 36.75 (208) | 22.97 (130) | 10.95 (62) | 100 (566) | 43.24 (243) | +6.49 (+35) | 45.55 (256) | +22.58 (+126) | 11.21 (63) | +0.26 (+1) | 100 (562) | (-4) | 52.59 (295) | +9.35 (+52) | 47.42 (266) | +1.86 (+10) | 100 (561) | (-1) |
| St. Catharines | 18.77 (70) | 30.30 (113) | 30.56 (114) | 20.38 (76) | 100 (373) | 32.88 (120) | +2.58 (+7) | 45.21 (165) | +14.64 (+51) | 21.92 (80) | +1.54 (+4) | 100 (365) | (-8) | 49.16 (175) | +16.28 (+55) | 50.84 (181) | +5.64 (+16) | 100 (356) | (-9) |
Peel-Halton
| Brampton Centre | 17.11 (39) | 36.40 (83) | 39.47 (90) | 7.02 (16) | 100 (228) | 37.28 (85) | +0.88 (+2) | 55.70 (127) | +16.23 (+37) | 7.02 (16) | +0.00 (+0) | 100 (228) | (0) | 42.48 (96) | +5.20 (+11) | 57.52 (130) | +1.82 (+3) | 100 (226) | (-2) |
| Brampton East | 3.44 (20) | 47.50 (276) | 32.53 (189) | 16.52 (96) | 100 (581) | 47.93 (278) | +0.43 (+2) | 35.52 (206) | +2.99 (+17) | 16.55 (96) | +0.03 (+0) | 100 (580) | (-1) | 58.47 (328) | +10.54 (+50) | 41.53 (233) | +6.02 (+27) | 100 (561) | (-19) |
| Brampton North | 12.33 (37) | 33.33 (100) | 40.67 (122) | 13.67 (41) | 100 (300) | 34.34 (102) | +1.01 (+2) | 50.51 (150) | +9.84 (+28) | 15.15 (45) | +1.49 (+4) | 100 (297) | (-3) | 44.41 (131) | +10.06 (+29) | 55.59 (164) | +5.09 (+14) | 100 (295) | (-2) |
| Brampton South; Candidate: Prabmeet Sarkaria (Mulroney) | 9.68 (36) | 26.88 (100) | 30.65 (114) | 32.80 (122) | 100 (372) | 28.03 (104) | +1.15 (+4) | 38.81 (144) | +8.17 (+30) | 33.15 (123) | +0.36 (+1) | 100 (371) | (-1) | 59.08 (218) | +31.05 (+114) | 40.92 (151) | +2.11 (+7) | 100 (369) | (-2) |
| Brampton West; Candidate: Amarjot Sandhu (Elliott) | 8.62 (28) | 52.62 (171) | 32.31 (105) | 6.46 (21) | 100 (325) | 53.56 (173) | +0.95 (+2) | 39.94 (129) | +7.63 (+24) | 6.50 (21) | +0.04 (+0) | 100 (323) | (-2) | 56.83 (183) | +3.27 (+10) | 43.17 (139) | +3.23 (+10) | 100 (322) | (-1) |
| Mississauga Centre | 17.58 (64) | 28.02 (102) | 46.15 (168) | 8.24 (30) | 100 (364) | 30.00 (108) | +1.98 (+6) | 60.28 (217) | +14.12 (+49) | 9.72 (35) | +1.48 (+5) | 100 (360) | (-4) | 36.31 (130) | +6.31 (+22) | 63.69 (228) | +3.41 (+11) | 100 (358) | (-2) |
| Mississauga East—Cooksville; Candidate: Kaleed Rasheed (Mulroney) | 22.54 (87) | 15.29 (59) | 49.74 (192) | 12.44 (48) | 100 (386) | 16.98 (64) | +1.69 (+5) | 69.50 (262) | +19.76 (+70) | 13.53 (51) | +1.09 (+3) | 100 (377) | (-9) | 24.66 (91) | +7.69 (+27) | 75.34 (278) | +5.84 (+16) | 100 (369) | (-8) |
| Mississauga—Erin Mills; Candidate: Sheref Sabawy (Elliott) | 16.45 (87) | 21.55 (114) | 53.88 (285) | 8.13 (43) | 100 (529) | 22.39 (118) | +0.84 (+4) | 67.93 (358) | +14.06 (+73) | 9.68 (51) | +1.55 (+8) | 100 (527) | (-2) | 29.58 (155) | +7.19 (+37) | 70.42 (369) | +2.49 (+11) | 100 (524) | (-3) |
| Mississauga—Lakeshore | 9.11 (78) | 42.29 (362) | 29.79 (255) | 18.81 (161) | 100 (856) | 43.14 (368) | +0.85 (+6) | 37.40 (319) | +7.61 (+64) | 19.46 (166) | +0.65 (+5) | 100 (853) | (-3) | 59.01 (491) | +15.87 (+123) | 40.99 (341) | +3.59 (+22) | 100 (832) | (-21) |
| Mississauga—Malton; Candidate: Deepak Anand (Elliott) | 12.50 (68) | 41.91 (228) | 32.90 (179) | 12.68 (69) | 100 (544) | 42.65 (232) | +0.73 (+4) | 43.75 (238) | +10.85 (+59) | 13.60 (74) | +0.92 (+5) | 100 (544) | (0) | 50.65 (272) | +8.01 (+40) | 49.35 (265) | +5.60 (+27) | 100 (537) | (-7) |
| Mississauga—Streetsville; Candidate: Nina Tangri (Elliott) | 12.72 (58) | 25.22 (115) | 53.07 (242) | 8.99 (41) | 100 (456) | 27.27 (123) | +2.05 (+8) | 63.19 (285) | +10.12 (+43) | 9.53 (43) | +0.54 (+2) | 100 (451) | (-5) | 34.67 (156) | +7.39 (+33) | 65.33 (294) | +2.14 (+9) | 100 (450) | (-1) |
| Burlington; Candidate: Jane McKenna (Mulroney) | 11.30 (75) | 40.06 (266) | 29.97 (199) | 18.68 (124) | 100 (664) | 40.88 (271) | +0.81 (+5) | 39.52 (262) | +9.55 (+63) | 19.61 (130) | +0.93 (+6) | 100 (663) | (-1) | 55.90 (365) | +15.02 (+94) | 44.10 (288) | +4.59 (+26) | 100 (653) | (-10) |
| Milton; MP: Lisa Raitt (Mulroney); Candidate: Parm Gill (Elliott) | 22.24 (115) | 28.43 (147) | 36.56 (189) | 12.77 (66) | 100 (517) | 30.27 (155) | +1.84 (+8) | 56.45 (289) | +19.89 (+100) | 13.28 (68) | +0.52 (+2) | 100 (512) | (-5) | 41.82 (212) | +11.54 (+57) | 58.19 (295) | +1.74 (+6) | 100 (507) | (-5) |
| Oakville; Candidate: Stephen Crawford (Mulroney) | 10.80 (120) | 38.34 (426) | 26.73 (297) | 24.12 (268) | 100 (1111) | 39.87 (441) | +1.53 (+15) | 35.44 (392) | +8.71 (+95) | 24.68 (273) | +0.56 (+5) | 100 (1106) | (-5) | 61.16 (666) | +21.28 (+225) | 38.84 (423) | +3.40 (+31) | 100 (1089) | (-17) |
| Oakville North—Burlington; Candidate: Effie Triantafilopoulos (Mulroney) | 11.63 (97) | 38.01 (317) | 30.58 (255) | 19.78 (165) | 100 (834) | 39.52 (326) | +1.51 (+9) | 40.00 (330) | +9.42 (+75) | 20.49 (169) | +0.70 (+4) | 100 (825) | (-9) | 54.80 (440) | +15.28 (+114) | 45.21 (363) | +5.21 (+33) | 100 (803) | (-22) |
York-Simcoe
| Aurora—Oak Ridges—Richmond Hill; Candidate: Michael Parsa (Elliott) | 16.25 (103) | 19.40 (123) | 55.36 (351) | 8.99 (57) | 100 (634) | 20.19 (128) | +0.79 (+5) | 70.51 (447) | +15.14 (+96) | 9.31 (59) | +0.32 (+2) | 100 (634) | (0) | 26.98 (170) | +6.80 (+42) | 73.02 (460) | +2.51 (+13) | 100 (630) | (-4) |
| King—Vaughan; Candidate: Stephen Lecce (Mulroney) | 10.73 (60) | 22.72 (127) | 46.69 (261) | 19.86 (111) | 100 (559) | 23.56 (131) | +0.84 (+4) | 56.30 (313) | +9.60 (+52) | 20.14 (112) | +0.29 (+1) | 100 (556) | (-3) | 36.85 (199) | +13.29 (+68) | 63.15 (341) | +6.85 (+28) | 100 (540) | (-16) |
| Markham—Stouffville; Candidate: Paul Calandra (Elliott) | 14.09 (92) | 36.29 (237) | 39.82 (260) | 9.80 (64) | 100 (653) | 37.85 (246) | +1.55 (+9) | 52.15 (339) | +12.34 (+79) | 10.00 (65) | +0.20 (+1) | 100 (650) | (-3) | 45.12 (291) | +7.27 (+45) | 54.88 (354) | +2.73 (+15) | 100 (645) | (-5) |
| Markham—Thornhill; Candidate: Logan Kanapathi (Elliott) | 11.67 (35) | 40.67 (122) | 33.67 (101) | 14.00 (42) | 100 (300) | 42.67 (128) | +2.00 (+6) | 43.00 (129) | +9.33 (+28) | 14.33 (43) | +0.33 (+1) | 100 (300) | (0) | 56.04 (167) | +13.37 (+39) | 43.96 (131) | +0.96 (+2) | 100 (298) | (-2) |
| Markham—Unionville | 12.84 (105) | 20.05 (164) | 60.39 (494) | 6.72 (55) | 100 (818) | 20.69 (169) | +0.64 (+5) | 72.46 (592) | +12.07 (+98) | 6.85 (56) | +0.13 (+1) | 100 (817) | (-1) | 24.50 (197) | +3.82 (+28) | 75.50 (607) | +3.04 (+15) | 100 (804) | (-13) |
| Newmarket—Aurora; Candidate: Charity McGrath (Ford) | 10.20 (71) | 33.76 (235) | 43.39 (302) | 12.64 (88) | 100 (696) | 36.28 (250) | +2.52 (+15) | 50.65 (349) | +7.26 (+47) | 13.06 (90) | +0.42 (+2) | 100 (689) | (-7) | 47.52 (326) | +11.24 (+76) | 52.48 (360) | +1.83 (+11) | 100 (686) | (-3) |
| Richmond Hill | 10.71 (51) | 30.25 (144) | 48.95 (233) | 10.08 (48) | 100 (476) | 31.14 (147) | +0.89 (+3) | 58.05 (274) | +9.10 (+41) | 10.81 (51) | +0.72 (+3) | 100 (472) | (-4) | 37.07 (172) | +5.93 (+25) | 62.93 (292) | +4.88 (+18) | 100 (464) | (-8) |
| Thornhill; MPP: Gila Martow (no endorsement); MP: Peter Kent (Elliott) | 11.81 (66) | 37.39 (209) | 35.78 (200) | 15.03 (84) | 100 (559) | 38.17 (213) | +0.78 (+4) | 46.06 (257) | +10.28 (+57) | 15.77 (88) | +0.74 (+4) | 100 (558) | (-1) | 50.45 (278) | +12.28 (+65) | 49.55 (273) | +3.49 (+16) | 100 (551) | (-7) |
| Vaughan—Woodbridge; Candidate: Michael Tibollo (Ford) | 12.54 (37) | 20.34 (60) | 58.98 (174) | 8.14 (24) | 100 (295) | 21.31 (62) | +0.97 (+2) | 70.10 (204) | +11.12 (+30) | 8.59 (25) | +0.46 (+1) | 100 (291) | (-4) | 24.83 (71) | +3.52 (+9) | 75.18 (215) | +5.07 (+11) | 100 (286) | (-5) |
| York—Simcoe; MPP: Julia Munro (no endorsement); MP: Peter Van Loan (Mulroney); Candidate: Caroline Mulroney (Mulroney) | 9.69 (41) | 18.68 (79) | 36.64 (155) | 34.99 (148) | 100 (423) | 19.00 (80) | +0.33 (+1) | 45.61 (192) | +8.96 (+37) | 35.39 (149) | +0.40 (+1) | 100 (421) | (-2) | 44.39 (178) | +25.39 (+98) | 55.61 (223) | +10.01 (+31) | 100 (401) | (-20) |
| Barrie—Innisfil | 9.18 (64) | 32.14 (224) | 42.18 (294) | 16.50 (115) | 100 (697) | 33.00 (229) | +0.86 (+5) | 50.14 (348) | +7.96 (+54) | 16.86 (117) | +0.36 (+2) | 100 (694) | (-3) | 43.61 (297) | +10.62 (+68) | 56.39 (384) | +6.24 (+36) | 100 (681) | (-13) |
| Barrie—Springwater—Oro-Medonte; MP: Alex Nuttall (Elliott) | 8.21 (70) | 46.54 (397) | 31.30 (267) | 13.95 (119) | 100 (853) | 47.93 (405) | +1.39 (+8) | 37.52 (317) | +6.21 (+50) | 14.56 (123) | +0.60 (+4) | 100 (845) | (-8) | 58.10 (484) | +10.17 (+79) | 41.90 (349) | +4.38 (+32) | 100 (833) | (-12) |
| Simcoe—Grey; MPP: Jim Wilson (Elliott) | 13.23 (75) | 41.09 (233) | 33.69 (191) | 11.99 (68) | 100 (567) | 42.30 (239) | +1.21 (+6) | 44.07 (249) | +10.39 (+58) | 13.63 (77) | +1.64 (+9) | 100 (565) | (-2) | 52.44 (290) | +10.14 (+51) | 47.56 (263) | +3.49 (+14) | 100 (553) | (-12) |
| Simcoe North; MP: Bruce Stanton (Mulroney); Candidate: Jill Dunlop (Elliott) | 6.91 (46) | 47.90 (319) | 27.18 (181) | 18.02 (120) | 100 (666) | 49.17 (325) | +1.27 (+6) | 32.22 (213) | +5.05 (+32) | 18.61 (123) | +0.59 (+3) | 100 (661) | (-5) | 64.04 (415) | +14.88 (+90) | 35.96 (233) | +3.73 (+20) | 100 (648) | (-13) |
Durham
| Ajax; Candidate: Rod Phillips (Mulroney) | 13.35 (69) | 47.97 (248) | 32.30 (167) | 6.38 (33) | 100 (517) | 50.10 (257) | +2.13 (+9) | 43.28 (222) | +10.97 (+55) | 6.63 (34) | +0.25 (+1) | 100 (513) | (-4) | 55.36 (284) | +5.26 (+27) | 44.64 (229) | +1.36 (+7) | 100 (513) | (0) |
| Durham; MP: Erin O'Toole (Elliott); Candidate: Lindsey Park (Elliott) | 9.87 (117) | 57.22 (678) | 26.84 (318) | 6.08 (72) | 100 (1185) | 58.02 (687) | +0.81 (+9) | 35.05 (415) | +8.22 (+97) | 6.93 (82) | +0.85 (+10) | 100 (1184) | (-1) | 63.34 (748) | +5.31 (+61) | 36.66 (433) | +1.61 (+18) | 100 (1181) | (-3) |
| Oshawa; Candidate: Bob Chapman (Elliott) | 11.01 (69) | 59.17 (371) | 24.56 (154) | 5.26 (33) | 100 (627) | 60.87 (378) | +1.70 (+7) | 33.66 (209) | +9.09 (+55) | 5.48 (34) | +0.21 (+1) | 100 (621) | (-6) | 64.78 (401) | +3.91 (+23) | 35.22 (218) | +1.56 (+9) | 100 (619) | (-2) |
| Pickering—Uxbridge; Candidate: Peter Bethlenfalvy (Elliott) | 12.11 (69) | 43.68 (249) | 31.93 (182) | 12.28 (70) | 100 (570) | 44.62 (253) | +0.94 (+4) | 42.33 (240) | +10.40 (+58) | 13.05 (74) | +0.77 (+4) | 100 (567) | (-3) | 54.69 (303) | +10.07 (+50) | 45.31 (251) | +2.98 (+11) | 100 (554) | (-13) |
| Whitby; MPP: Lorne Coe (Elliott) | 6.22 (68) | 74.95 (820) | 15.08 (165) | 3.75 (41) | 100 (1094) | 76.40 (832) | +1.45 (+12) | 19.56 (213) | +4.48 (+48) | 4.04 (44) | +0.29 (+3) | 100 (1089) | (-5) | 79.15 (858) | +2.75 (+26) | 20.85 (226) | +1.29 (+13) | 100 (1084) | (-5) |

Eastern Ontario
| Riding | Ballot 1 | | | | | Ballot 2 | | | | | | | | Ballot 3 | | | | | |
| Caucus/Candidate (Supported) | Allen | Elliott | Ford | Mulroney | Total | Elliott | | Ford | | Mulroney | | Total | | Elliott | | Ford | | Total | |
National Capital Region
| Carleton; Candidate: Goldie Ghamari (Elliott) | 18.00 (187) | 27.72 (288) | 26.47 (275) | 27.82 (289) | 100 (1039) | 29.14 (301) | +1.42 (+13) | 41.34 (427) | +14.87 (+152) | 29.53 (305) | +1.71 (+16) | 100 (1033) | (-6) | 50.64 (511) | +21.51 (+210) | 49.36 (498) | +8.02 (+71) | 100 (1009) | (-24) |
| Kanata—Carleton; Candidate: Merrilee Fullerton (Mulroney) | 15.14 (139) | 30.17 (277) | 22.88 (210) | 31.81 (292) | 100 (918) | 31.93 (288) | +1.76 (+11) | 35.03 (316) | +12.16 (+106) | 33.04 (298) | +1.23 (+6) | 100 (902) | (-16) | 56.57 (495) | +24.64 (+207) | 43.43 (380) | +8.40 (+64) | 100 (875) | (-27) |
| Nepean; MPP: Lisa MacLeod (no endorsement) | 13.84 (84) | 31.63 (192) | 26.03 (158) | 28.50 (173) | 100 (607) | 33.39 (202) | +1.76 (+10) | 37.36 (226) | +11.33 (+68) | 29.26 (177) | +0.75 (+4) | 100 (605) | (-2) | 52.72 (310) | +19.33 (+108) | 47.28 (278) | +9.92 (+52) | 100 (588) | (-17) |
| Orléans; Candidate: Cameron Montgomery (Elliott) | 28.30 (161) | 29.70 (169) | 23.37 (133) | 18.63 (106) | 100 (569) | 32.80 (186) | +3.10 (+17) | 46.91 (266) | +23.54 (+133) | 20.28 (115) | +1.65 (+9) | 100 (567) | (-2) | 47.85 (267) | +15.05 (+81) | 52.15 (291) | +5.24 (+25) | 100 (558) | (-9) |
| Ottawa Centre | 15.44 (88) | 35.97 (205) | 19.30 (110) | 29.30 (167) | 100 (570) | 37.74 (214) | +1.78 (+9) | 31.92 (181) | +12.62 (+71) | 30.34 (172) | +1.04 (+5) | 100 (567) | (-3) | 62.03 (343) | +24.28 (+129) | 37.98 (210) | +6.05 (+29) | 100 (553) | (-14) |
| Ottawa South; Candidate: Karin Howard (Elliott) | 21.18 (115) | 35.91 (195) | 19.71 (107) | 23.20 (126) | 100 (543) | 39.96 (213) | +4.05 (+18) | 36.21 (193) | +16.51 (+86) | 23.83 (127) | +0.62 (+1) | 100 (533) | (-10) | 54.63 (283) | +14.67 (+70) | 45.37 (235) | +9.16 (+42) | 100 (518) | (-15) |
| Ottawa—Vanier; Candidate: Fadi Nemr (Elliott) | 20.00 (66) | 34.55 (114) | 20.61 (68) | 24.85 (82) | 100 (330) | 38.60 (127) | +4.06 (+13) | 34.04 (112) | +13.44 (+44) | 27.36 (90) | +2.51 (+8) | 100 (329) | (-1) | 58.31 (186) | +19.71 (+59) | 41.69 (133) | +7.65 (+21) | 100 (319) | (-10) |
| Ottawa West—Nepean; Candidate: Jeremy Roberts (Elliott) | 17.10 (118) | 36.67 (253) | 22.75 (157) | 23.48 (162) | 100 (690) | 40.26 (277) | +3.60 (+24) | 34.01 (234) | +11.26 (+77) | 25.73 (177) | +2.25 (+15) | 100 (688) | (-2) | 58.81 (394) | +18.54 (+117) | 41.19 (276) | +7.18 (+42) | 100 (670) | (-18) |
Eastern Ontario
| Bay of Quinte; MPP: Todd Smith (Elliott) | 11.76 (91) | 56.85 (440) | 22.35 (173) | 9.04 (70) | 100 (774) | 57.76 (443) | +0.91 (+3) | 32.86 (252) | +10.50 (+79) | 9.39 (72) | +0.34 (+2) | 100 (767) | (-7) | 64.48 (492) | +6.73 (+49) | 35.52 (271) | +2.66 (+19) | 100 (763) | (-4) |
| Glengarry—Prescott—Russell; Candidate: Amanda Simard (Elliott) | 22.56 (90) | 30.58 (122) | 26.57 (106) | 20.30 (81) | 100 (399) | 33.00 (130) | +2.42 (+8) | 44.16 (174) | +17.60 (+68) | 22.84 (90) | +2.54 (+9) | 100 (394) | (-5) | 50.52 (195) | +17.52 (+65) | 49.48 (191) | +5.32 (+17) | 100 (386) | (-8) |
| Haliburton—Kawartha Lakes—Brock; MPP: Laurie Scott (Elliott) | 11.53 (102) | 41.02 (363) | 34.12 (302) | 13.33 (118) | 100 (885) | 42.17 (369) | +1.15 (+6) | 43.89 (384) | +9.76 (+82) | 13.94 (122) | +0.61 (+4) | 100 (875) | (-10) | 52.36 (455) | +10.19 (+86) | 47.64 (414) | +3.76 (+30) | 100 (869) | (-6) |
| Hastings—Lennox and Addington; Candidate: Daryl Kramp (Mulroney) | 14.81 (73) | 41.18 (203) | 28.60 (141) | 15.42 (76) | 100 (493) | 43.39 (210) | +2.21 (+7) | 39.88 (193) | +11.28 (+52) | 16.74 (81) | +1.32 (+5) | 100 (484) | (-9) | 57.02 (272) | +13.64 (+62) | 42.98 (205) | +3.10 (+12) | 100 (477) | (-7) |
| Kingston and the Islands | 19.14 (85) | 41.89 (186) | 15.32 (68) | 23.65 (105) | 100 (444) | 44.50 (194) | +2.60 (+8) | 29.82 (130) | +14.50 (+62) | 25.69 (112) | +2.04 (+7) | 100 (436) | (-8) | 67.29 (286) | +22.80 (+92) | 32.71 (139) | +2.89 (+9) | 100 (425) | (-11) |
| Lanark—Frontenac—Kingston; MPP: Randy Hillier (Elliott); MP: Scott Reid (Elliott) | 16.52 (77) | 41.20 (192) | 20.60 (96) | 21.67 (101) | 100 (466) | 43.72 (202) | +2.52 (+10) | 33.12 (153) | +12.52 (+57) | 23.16 (107) | +1.49 (+6) | 100 (462) | (-4) | 60.63 (271) | +16.90 (+69) | 39.37 (176) | +6.26 (+23) | 100 (447) | (-15) |
| Leeds—Grenville—Thousand Islands and Rideau Lakes; MPP: Steve Clark (no endorsement); MP: Gord Brown (Mulroney) | 11.73 (53) | 26.33 (119) | 31.20 (141) | 30.75 (139) | 100 (452) | 27.29 (122) | +0.97 (+3) | 41.39 (185) | +10.19 (+44) | 31.32 (140) | +0.57 (+1) | 100 (447) | (-5) | 48.35 (205) | +21.06 (+83) | 51.65 (219) | +10.26 (+34) | 100 (424) | (-23) |
| Northumberland—Peterborough South; Candidate: David Piccini (Elliott) | 8.57 (58) | 55.69 (377) | 28.21 (191) | 7.53 (51) | 100 (677) | 56.63 (380) | +0.95 (+3) | 35.02 (235) | +6.81 (+44) | 8.35 (56) | +0.81 (+5) | 100 (671) | (-6) | 61.39 (407) | +4.76 (+27) | 38.61 (256) | +3.59 (+21) | 100 (663) | (-8) |
| Peterborough—Kawartha; Candidate: Dave Smith (Elliott) | 14.62 (75) | 48.54 (249) | 25.34 (130) | 11.50 (59) | 100 (513) | 49.80 (253) | +1.27 (+4) | 38.58 (196) | +13.24 (+66) | 11.61 (59) | +0.11 (+0) | 100 (508) | (-5) | 59.16 (297) | +9.36 (+44) | 40.84 (205) | +2.25 (+9) | 100 (502) | (-6) |
| Stormont—Dundas—South Glengarry; MPP: Jim McDonell (Elliott); MP: Guy Lauzon (Mulroney) | 11.24 (39) | 40.63 (141) | 29.40 (102) | 18.73 (65) | 100 (347) | 42.11 (144) | +1.47 (+3) | 37.43 (128) | +8.03 (+26) | 20.47 (70) | +1.74 (+5) | 100 (342) | (-5) | 57.70 (191) | +15.60 (+47) | 42.30 (140) | +4.87 (+12) | 100 (331) | (-11) |

Southwestern Ontario
| Riding | Ballot 1 | | | | | Ballot 2 | | | | | | | | Ballot 3 | | | | | |
| Caucus/Candidate (Supported) | Allen | Elliott | Ford | Mulroney | Total | Elliott | | Ford | | Mulroney | | Total | | Elliott | | Ford | | Total | |
Kitchener-Waterloo
| Cambridge | 21.82 (139) | 42.86 (273) | 23.08 (147) | 12.25 (78) | 100 (637) | 47.06 (296) | +4.20 (+23) | 39.43 (248) | +16.35 (+101) | 13.51 (85) | +1.27 (+7) | 100 (629) | (-8) | 57.79 (360) | +10.73 (+64) | 42.22 (263) | +2.79 (+15) | 100 (623) | (-6) |
| Guelph | 16.27 (68) | 38.52 (161) | 27.03 (113) | 18.18 (76) | 100 (418) | 39.52 (164) | +1.00 (+3) | 40.72 (169) | +13.69 (+56) | 19.76 (82) | +1.58 (+6) | 100 (415) | (-3) | 54.59 (220) | +15.07 (+56) | 45.41 (183) | +4.69 (+14) | 100 (403) | (-12) |
| Kitchener Centre; Candidate: Mary Henein Thorn (Elliott) | 30.80 (146) | 36.92 (175) | 20.46 (97) | 11.81 (56) | 100 (474) | 39.61 (183) | +2.69 (+8) | 46.97 (217) | +26.51 (+120) | 13.42 (62) | +1.61 (+6) | 100 (462) | (-12) | 49.78 (227) | +10.17 (+44) | 50.22 (229) | +3.25 (+12) | 100 (456) | (-6) |
| Kitchener—Conestoga; MPP: Michael Harris (Elliott) | 26.50 (141) | 36.28 (193) | 25.38 (135) | 11.84 (63) | 100 (532) | 39.54 (208) | +3.27 (+15) | 47.34 (249) | +21.96 (+114) | 13.12 (69) | +1.28 (+6) | 100 (526) | (-6) | 50.10 (259) | +10.55 (+51) | 49.90 (258) | +2.57 (+9) | 100 (517) | (-9) |
| Kitchener South—Hespeler; Candidate: Amy Fee (Elliott) | 16.97 (74) | 40.37 (176) | 30.96 (135) | 11.70 (51) | 100 (436) | 41.16 (177) | +0.80 (+1) | 45.81 (197) | +14.85 (+62) | 13.02 (56) | +1.33 (+5) | 100 (430) | (-6) | 49.53 (212) | +8.37 (+35) | 50.47 (216) | +4.65 (+19) | 100 (428) | (-2) |
| Waterloo | 20.32 (128) | 32.06 (202) | 27.46 (173) | 20.16 (127) | 100 (630) | 34.78 (216) | +2.72 (+14) | 43.96 (273) | +16.50 (+100) | 21.26 (132) | +1.10 (+5) | 100 (621) | (-9) | 51.90 (314) | +17.12 (+98) | 48.10 (291) | +4.14 (+18) | 100 (605) | (-16) |
| Wellington—Halton Hills; MPP: Ted Arnott (Elliott); MP: Michael Chong (Elliott) | 22.36 (93) | 35.10 (146) | 28.61 (119) | 13.94 (58) | 100 (416) | 37.07 (152) | +1.98 (+6) | 48.54 (199) | +19.93 (+80) | 14.39 (59) | +0.45 (+1) | 100 (410) | (-6) | 48.14 (194) | +11.07 (+42) | 51.86 (209) | +3.32 (+10) | 100 (403) | (-7) |
London
| Elgin—Middlesex—London; MPP: Jeff Yurek (Mulroney) | 21.84 (154) | 29.50 (208) | 26.53 (187) | 22.13 (156) | 100 (705) | 31.24 (219) | +1.74 (+11) | 44.22 (310) | +17.70 (+123) | 24.54 (172) | +2.41 (+16) | 100 (701) | (-4) | 49.11 (330) | +17.87 (+111) | 50.89 (342) | +6.67 (+32) | 100 (672) | (-29) |
| London—Fanshawe | 24.90 (64) | 31.13 (80) | 34.24 (88) | 9.73 (25) | 100 (257) | 34.39 (87) | +3.26 (+7) | 54.55 (138) | +20.30 (+50) | 11.07 (28) | +1.34 (+3) | 100 (253) | (-4) | 40.16 (100) | +5.77 (+13) | 59.84 (149) | +5.29 (+11) | 100 (249) | (-4) |
| London North Centre; Candidate: Susan Truppe (Mulroney) | 14.63 (98) | 40.45 (271) | 22.69 (152) | 22.24 (149) | 100 (670) | 42.60 (282) | +2.15 (+11) | 34.14 (226) | +11.45 (+74) | 23.26 (154) | +1.02 (+5) | 100 (662) | (-8) | 60.41 (383) | +17.81 (+101) | 39.59 (251) | +5.45 (+25) | 100 (634) | (-28) |
| London West | 16.44 (111) | 43.56 (294) | 19.56 (132) | 20.44 (138) | 100 (675) | 46.48 (310) | +2.92 (+16) | 31.63 (211) | +12.08 (+79) | 21.89 (146) | +1.45 (+8) | 100 (667) | (-8) | 61.80 (406) | +15.32 (+96) | 38.20 (251) | +6.57 (+40) | 100 (657) | (-10) |
Windsor-Essex
| Chatham-Kent—Leamington; MPP: Rick Nicholls (no endorsement) | 23.08 (108) | 30.34 (142) | 29.49 (138) | 17.09 (80) | 100 (468) | 33.33 (152) | +2.99 (+10) | 48.03 (219) | +18.54 (+81) | 18.64 (85) | +1.55 (+5) | 100 (456) | (-12) | 46.53 (208) | +13.20 (+56) | 53.47 (239) | +5.44 (+20) | 100 (447) | (-9) |
| Essex | 32.71 (123) | 26.06 (98) | 23.94 (90) | 17.29 (65) | 100 (376) | 27.87 (102) | +1.81 (+4) | 51.91 (190) | +27.98 (+100) | 20.22 (74) | +2.93 (+9) | 100 (366) | (-10) | 42.14 (150) | +14.27 (+48) | 57.87 (206) | +5.95 (+16) | 100 (356) | (-10) |
| Windsor—Tecumseh; Candidate: Mohammad Latif (Elliott) | 31.68 (64) | 27.23 (55) | 27.23 (55) | 13.86 (28) | 100 (202) | 28.06 (55) | +0.83 (+0) | 56.63 (111) | +29.41 (+56) | 15.31 (30) | +1.45 (+2) | 100 (196) | (-6) | 39.27 (75) | +11.21 (+20) | 60.73 (116) | +4.10 (+5) | 100 (191) | (-5) |
| Windsor West; Candidate: Adam Ibrahim (Elliott) | 24.06 (45) | 20.32 (38) | 26.74 (50) | 28.88 (54) | 100 (187) | 22.28 (41) | +1.96 (+3) | 46.74 (86) | +20.00 (+36) | 30.98 (57) | +2.10 (+3) | 100 (184) | (-3) | 41.46 (68) | +19.18 (+27) | 58.54 (96) | +11.80 (+10) | 100 (164) | (-20) |
Rural
| Brantford—Brant; MP: Phil McColeman (Mulroney); Candidate: Will Bouma (Mulroney) | 23.85 (176) | 28.18 (208) | 32.66 (241) | 15.31 (113) | 100 (738) | 32.01 (234) | +3.83 (+26) | 50.75 (371) | +18.10 (+130) | 17.24 (126) | +1.93 (+13) | 100 (731) | (-7) | 43.91 (317) | +11.90 (+83) | 56.09 (405) | +5.34 (+34) | 100 (722) | (-9) |
| Bruce—Grey—Owen Sound; MPP: Bill Walker (Elliott) | 19.55 (166) | 40.17 (341) | 22.85 (194) | 17.43 (148) | 100 (849) | 41.86 (352) | +1.69 (+11) | 39.00 (328) | +16.15 (+134) | 19.14 (161) | +1.71 (+13) | 100 (841) | (-8) | 56.04 (459) | +14.19 (+107) | 43.96 (360) | +4.96 (+32) | 100 (819) | (-22) |
| Dufferin—Caledon; MPP: Sylvia Jones (no endorsement); MP: David Tilson (Mulroney) | 13.42 (132) | 32.93 (324) | 37.70 (371) | 15.96 (157) | 100 (984) | 33.98 (333) | +1.05 (+9) | 49.18 (482) | +11.48 (+111) | 16.84 (165) | +0.88 (+8) | 100 (980) | (-4) | 46.64 (451) | +12.66 (+118) | 53.36 (516) | +4.18 (+34) | 100 (967) | (-13) |
| Haldimand—Norfolk; MPP: Toby Barrett (Ford); MP: Diane Finley (Mulroney) | 24.44 (120) | 25.66 (126) | 39.72 (195) | 10.18 (50) | 100 (491) | 29.10 (142) | +3.44 (+16) | 59.02 (288) | +19.30 (+93) | 11.89 (58) | +1.70 (+8) | 100 (488) | (-3) | 38.33 (184) | +9.24 (+42) | 61.67 (296) | +2.65 (+8) | 100 (480) | (-8) |
| Huron—Bruce; MPP: Lisa Thompson (no endorsement); MP: Ben Lobb (Elliott) | 24.47 (138) | 37.59 (212) | 21.63 (122) | 16.31 (92) | 100 (564) | 41.11 (229) | +3.52 (+17) | 40.40 (225) | +18.76 (+103) | 18.49 (103) | +2.18 (+11) | 100 (557) | (-7) | 54.44 (294) | +13.33 (+65) | 45.56 (246) | +5.16 (+21) | 100 (540) | (-17) |
| Lambton—Kent—Middlesex; MPP: Monte McNaughton (Mulroney) | 20.31 (92) | 23.84 (108) | 26.49 (120) | 29.36 (133) | 100 (453) | 27.07 (121) | +3.23 (+13) | 40.94 (183) | +14.45 (+63) | 31.99 (143) | +2.63 (+10) | 100 (447) | (-6) | 46.95 (200) | +19.88 (+79) | 53.05 (226) | +12.11 (+43) | 100 (426) | (-21) |
| Oxford; MPP: Ernie Hardeman (Elliott) | 28.29 (187) | 31.92 (211) | 26.32 (174) | 13.46 (89) | 100 (661) | 35.64 (232) | +3.72 (+21) | 49.00 (319) | +22.68 (+145) | 15.36 (100) | +1.90 (+11) | 100 (651) | (-10) | 46.09 (295) | +10.46 (+63) | 53.91 (345) | +4.90 (+26) | 100 (640) | (-11) |
| Perth—Wellington; MPP: Randy Pettapiece (Elliott); MP: John Nater (Elliott) | 20.71 (111) | 37.13 (199) | 27.05 (145) | 15.11 (81) | 100 (536) | 38.61 (205) | +1.48 (+6) | 45.01 (239) | +17.96 (+94) | 16.38 (87) | +1.27 (+6) | 100 (531) | (-5) | 51.81 (272) | +13.20 (+67) | 48.19 (253) | +3.18 (+14) | 100 (525) | (-6) |
| Sarnia—Lambton; MPP: Bob Bailey (Mulroney); MP: Marilyn Gladu (Elliott) | 24.34 (147) | 27.65 (167) | 28.81 (174) | 19.21 (116) | 100 (604) | 28.45 (169) | +0.80 (+2) | 49.83 (296) | +21.02 (+122) | 21.72 (129) | +2.51 (+13) | 100 (594) | (-10) | 42.91 (245) | +14.46 (+76) | 57.09 (326) | +7.26 (+30) | 100 (571) | (-23) |

Northern Ontario
| Riding | Ballot 1 | | | | | Ballot 2 | | | | | | | | Ballot 3 | | | | | |
| Caucus/Candidate (Supported) | Allen | Elliott | Ford | Mulroney | Total | Elliott | | Ford | | Mulroney | | Total | | Elliott | | Ford | | Total | |
|---|---|---|---|---|---|---|---|---|---|---|---|---|---|---|---|---|---|---|---|
| Algoma—Manitoulin | 23.94 (45) | 27.66 (52) | 38.83 (73) | 9.57 (18) | 100 (188) | 29.41 (55) | +1.75 (+3) | 59.89 (112) | +21.06 (+39) | 10.70 (20) | +1.12 (+2) | 100 (187) | (-1) | 37.63 (70) | +8.22 (+15) | 62.37 (116) | +2.47 (+4) | 100 (186) | (-1) |
| Kenora—Rainy River; Candidate: Greg Rickford (Mulroney) | 15.79 (30) | 22.11 (42) | 22.11 (42) | 40.00 (76) | 100 (190) | 23.40 (44) | +1.30 (+2) | 35.11 (66) | +13.00 (+24) | 41.49 (78) | +1.49 (+2) | 100 (188) | (-2) | 58.33 (105) | +34.93 (+61) | 41.67 (75) | +6.56 (+9) | 100 (180) | (-8) |
| Nickel Belt | 11.26 (17) | 27.15 (41) | 38.41 (58) | 23.18 (35) | 100 (151) | 28.48 (43) | +1.33 (+2) | 48.34 (73) | +9.93 (+15) | 23.18 (35) | +0.00 (+0) | 100 (151) | (0) | 45.27 (67) | +16.79 (+24) | 54.73 (81) | +6.39 (+8) | 100 (148) | (-3) |
| Nipissing; MPP: Vic Fedeli (no endorsement) | 16.82 (56) | 48.35 (161) | 19.82 (66) | 15.02 (50) | 100 (333) | 50.30 (166) | +1.96 (+5) | 33.64 (111) | +13.82 (+45) | 16.06 (53) | +1.05 (+3) | 100 (330) | (-3) | 61.68 (198) | +11.38 (+32) | 38.32 (123) | +4.68 (+12) | 100 (321) | (-9) |
| Parry Sound—Muskoka; MPP: Norm Miller (Mulroney); MP: Tony Clement (Mulroney) | 6.44 (32) | 33.20 (165) | 30.99 (154) | 29.38 (146) | 100 (497) | 34.00 (169) | +0.81 (+4) | 35.61 (177) | +4.63 (+23) | 30.38 (151) | +1.01 (+5) | 100 (497) | (0) | 59.92 (293) | +25.91 (+124) | 40.08 (196) | +4.47 (+19) | 100 (489) | (-8) |
| Renfrew—Nipissing—Pembroke; MPP: John Yakabuski (Mulroney) | 26.66 (169) | 17.82 (113) | 31.07 (197) | 24.45 (155) | 100 (634) | 21.05 (132) | +3.23 (+19) | 53.11 (333) | +22.04 (+136) | 25.84 (162) | +1.39 (+7) | 100 (627) | (-7) | 38.29 (229) | +17.24 (+97) | 61.71 (369) | +8.60 (+36) | 100 (598) | (-29) |
| Sault Ste. Marie; MPP: Ross Romano (Elliott) | 23.23 (36) | 41.94 (65) | 23.87 (37) | 10.97 (17) | 100 (155) | 45.03 (68) | +3.10 (+3) | 43.05 (65) | +19.18 (+28) | 11.92 (18) | +0.95 (+1) | 100 (151) | (-4) | 54.00 (81) | +8.97 (+13) | 46.00 (69) | +2.95 (+4) | 100 (150) | (-1) |
| Sudbury | 13.94 (29) | 33.17 (69) | 37.02 (77) | 15.87 (33) | 100 (208) | 33.98 (70) | +0.81 (+1) | 49.52 (102) | +12.50 (+25) | 16.51 (34) | +0.64 (+1) | 100 (206) | (-2) | 44.55 (90) | +10.57 (+20) | 55.45 (112) | +5.93 (+10) | 100 (202) | (-4) |
| Thunder Bay—Atikokan | 23.56 (41) | 41.95 (73) | 22.41 (39) | 12.07 (21) | 100 (174) | 44.51 (77) | +2.56 (+4) | 41.62 (72) | +19.20 (+33) | 13.87 (24) | +1.80 (+3) | 100 (173) | (-1) | 52.91 (91) | +8.40 (+14) | 47.09 (81) | +5.48 (+9) | 100 (172) | (-1) |
| Thunder Bay—Superior North; Candidate: Derek Parks (Elliott) | 14.39 (19) | 28.79 (38) | 33.33 (44) | 23.49 (31) | 100 (132) | 31.06 (41) | +2.27 (+3) | 44.70 (59) | +11.36 (+15) | 24.24 (32) | +0.76 (+1) | 100 (132) | (0) | 48.82 (62) | +17.76 (+21) | 51.18 (65) | +6.48 (+6) | 100 (127) | (-5) |
| Timiskaming—Cochrane | 25.87 (37) | 24.48 (35) | 36.36 (52) | 13.29 (19) | 100 (143) | 25.35 (36) | +0.88 (+1) | 60.56 (86) | +24.20 (+34) | 14.09 (20) | +0.80 (+1) | 100 (142) | (-1) | 35.97 (50) | +10.62 (+14) | 64.03 (89) | +3.47 (+3) | 100 (139) | (-3) |
| Timmins | 4.00 (4) | 25.00 (25) | 21.00 (21) | 28.00 (28) | 78 (78) | 25.00 (25) | +0.00 (+0) | 25.00 (25) | +4.00 (+4) | 28.00 (28) | +0.00 (+0) | 78 (78) | (0) | 49.00 (49) | +24.00 (+24) | 28.00 (28) | +3.00 (+3) | 77 (77) | (-1) |
| Kiiwetinoong; Candidate: Clifford Bull (Mulroney) | 3.00 (3) | 3.00 (3) | 11.00 (11) | 17.00 (17) | 34 (34) | 3.00 (3) | +0.00 (+0) | 13.00 (13) | +2.00 (+2) | 18.00 (18) | +1.00 (+1) | 34 (34) | (0) | 14.00 (14) | +11.00 (+11) | 17.00 (17) | +4.00 (+4) | 31 (31) | (-3) |
| Mushkegowuk—James Bay; Candidate: André Robichaud (Mulroney) | 3.00 (3) | 1.00 (1) | 8.00 (8) | 43.00 (43) | 55 (55) | 1.00 (1) | +0.00 (+0) | 11.00 (11) | +3.00 (+3) | 43.00 (43) | +0.00 (+0) | 55 (55) | (0) | 28.00 (28) | +27.00 (+27) | 15.00 (15) | +4.00 (+4) | 43 (43) | (-12) |
