= 1936 Conservative Party of Ontario leadership election =

- Date: May 28, 1936
- Convention: Royal York Hotel, Toronto
- Resigning leader: George S. Henry
- Won by: Earl Rowe
- Ballots: 2
- Candidates: 7

A Conservative Party of Ontario leadership election (formally the convention of the Liberal-Conservative Association of Ontario) was held on the week of May 25, 1936 at the Royal York Hotel in Toronto culminating in a ballot for leader on May 28, 1936 to replace retiring Conservative leader and former premier George S. Henry, who had resigned after his party lost the 1934 provincial election to Mitchell Hepburn's Liberals. The party selected federal Member of Parliament Earl Rowe on the second ballot. The results for the first ballot were not originally going to be read out but various delegates shouted from the floor demanding the results and the vote totals were read out.

== First ballot ==
- Rowe, Earl 782
- Drew, George 480
- Stewart, William James 157
- Macaulay, Leopold 90
- Heighington, Wilfrid 70
- Acres, Adam 47
- Ellis, Arthur 10

(Ellis eliminated, Stewart, Macaulay, Heighington, Acres withdraw. Stewart yells into an open microphone that he endorses Drew after the convention votes not to give withdrawing candidates a chance to speak before the second ballot.)

== Second ballot ==
- Rowe, Earl 1005
- Drew, George 660

== See also ==
- Progressive Party of Ontario leadership conventions
