= George William Monk =

Canadian politician

George Monk
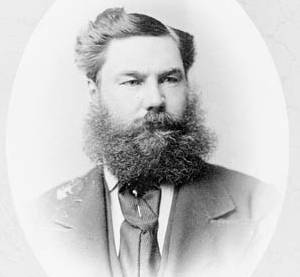

Ontario MPP
- In office 1871–1894
- Preceded by: Robert Lyon
- Succeeded by: George Kidd
- Constituency: Carleton

Personal details
- Born: September 10, 1838 March Township, Ontario
- Died: August 18, 1917 (aged 78) March Township, Ontario
- Party: Conservative

George William Monk (September 10, 1838 – August 18, 1917) was a member of the Legislative Assembly of Ontario who represented the Ottawa area riding of Carleton from 1871 to 1894.

He was born in March Township, Ontario in 1838. He was educated in Bytown and Potsdam, New York.

Monk represented Carleton in the Ontario Legislative Assembly from 1871 to 1894 as a Conservative MLA. He was a deputy grandmaster of the Orange Lodge in British North America. He died in 1917.

== Electoral history ==
1871 Ontario general election: Carleton
Party	Candidate	Votes	%
Conservative	George William Monk	822	50.31
Liberal	Robert Lyon	812	49.69
Turnout		1,634	63.46
Eligible voters		2,575	
Election voided
Source: Elections Ontario

Ontario provincial by-election, January 1872: Carleton Previous election voided
Party	Candidate	Votes	%	±%
Conservative	George William Monk	1,109	54.23	+9.24
Liberal	Robert Lyon	936	45.77	−1.52
Total valid votes		2,045	100.0	−2.01
Conservative gain from Liberal		Swing		+5.38
Source: History of the Electoral Districts, Legislatures and Ministries of the Province of Ontario

1875 Ontario general election: Carleton
Party	Candidate	Votes
Conservative	George William Monk	Acclaimed
Source: Elections Ontario

1879 Ontario general election: Carleton
Party	Candidate	Votes	%
Conservative	George William Monk	2,074	79.74
Liberal	C. Christian	527	20.26
Total valid votes		2,601	55.47
Eligible voters		4,689	
Conservative hold			
Source: Elections Ontario
