= Sid Handleman =

Canadian politician

Ontario MPP
- In office 1971–1980
- Preceded by: Bill Johnston
- Succeeded by: Bob Mitchell
- Constituency: Carleton

Personal details
- Born: March 20, 1921 Toronto, Ontario, Canada
- Died: June 23, 1988 (aged 67) Ottawa, Ontario, Canada
- Party: Progressive Conservative
- Spouse: Ruth Grace
- Children: 2

Sidney Bernard Handleman (March 20, 1921 – June 23, 1988) was a Canadian politician who represented Carleton in the Legislative Assembly of Ontario from 1971 to 1980 as a Progressive Conservative member.

== Background ==
Handleman was born in Toronto in 1921 to Bernard Handleman and Esther White. He attended the London School of Economics and the University of Saskatchewan and graduated with a Bachelor of Commerce. He married Ruth Grace. Together they lived in Ottawa, Ontario where they raised a son and a daughter.

== Politics ==
In the 1971 provincial election, Handleman ran as the Progressive Conservative candidate in the riding of Carleton beating Liberal candidate F. Marchington by 7,706 votes. In February 1974, Handleman was appointed to cabinet as Minister of Housing. However, on July 4 he suffered a heart attack and spent three weeks recovering in hospital. In October, in order to reduce his workload, he was transferred from Housing to a Minister without portfolio. In July 1975, he was promoted back to full status as Minister of Consumer and Commercial Relations.

In the 1975 election, he was re-elected but with a reduced margin of 676 votes but increased his winning plurality in 1977 election.

In 1975 he gained some notoriety when he said that the year would be remembered as the "year of economic pillage and rape" due to the "unreasonable demands' of workers for wage increases". He remained in his role as Minister of Consumer and Commercial Relations until September 1977 when he resigned citing frustrations about working in cabinet under a minority government. He said, "I recognize the need for opposition. There also has to be a government that can make decisions and be accountable for it. There has to be strength in government."

In February 1980, Handleman announced his retirement from politics. His retirement was effective April 15.

=== Cabinet posts ===
Davis ministry, Province of Ontario (1971–1985)
Cabinet posts (2)
| Predecessor | Office | Successor |
|---|---|---|
| John Clement | Minister of Consumer and Commercial Relations; 1975–1977 | Larry Grossman |
| Bob Welch | Minister of Housing; 1974 (February–October) | Donald Irvine |
Sub-Cabinet Post
| Predecessor | Title | Successor |
| | Minister Without Portfolio (1974–1975) | |

== Later life ==
After he left politics he joined a consulting firm in Ottawa and became a political columnist for the Toronto Star. He died of a heart attack at age 67.

== Electoral record ==
1975 Ontario general election: Carleton
| Party | Candidate | Votes | % |
|---|---|---|---|
| Progressive Conservative | Sid Handleman | 12,653 | 38.87 |
| Liberal | Ben Franklin | 11,977 | 36.79 |
| New Democratic | Gordon Kritsch | 7,769 | 23.86 |
| Independent | Michael Sammon | 157 | 0.48 |
| Total valid votes | | 32,556 | |
| Turnout | | – | 68.68 |
| Eligible voters | | 47,400 | |
