= Reuben Baetz =

Canadian politician (1923–1996)

Ontario MPP
- In office 1977–1987
- Preceded by: Donald Morrow
- Succeeded by: Bob Chiarelli
- Constituency: Ottawa West

Personal details
- Born: May 9, 1923 Chesley, Ontario, Canada
- Died: October 28, 1996 (aged 73)
- Party: Progressive Conservative
- Occupation: Lawyer

Reuben Conrad Baetz (May 9, 1923 – October 28, 1996) was a Canadian politician. He served in the Legislative Assembly of Ontario from 1977 to 1987, and was a cabinet minister in the governments of Bill Davis and Frank Miller. Baetz was a member of the Progressive Conservative Party.

== Background ==
Baetz was born in Chesley, Ontario. His father was a Lutheran minister, and Baetz remained a Lutheran throughout his life. He was educated at Wilfrid Laurier University (then Waterloo Lutheran Seminary, affiliated with the University of Western Ontario), Columbia University in New York, and the University of Toronto. He became a social worker and assisted in the reconstruction of Germany and Hungary after World War II. Before entering provincial politics, he was a member of the Ontario Economic Council, the Canada Manpower and Immigration Council and the Canadian Association of Social Workers. He led the Canadian Council of Social Development from 1963 to 1977.

== Politics ==
He was elected to the Ontario legislature in the 1977 provincial election, defeating Liberal Bill Roberts by 5,823 votes in Ottawa West. He entered Bill Davis's cabinet on January 21, 1978 as Minister of Energy, and was named Minister of Culture and Recreation on August 18, 1978.

Baetz was easily re-elected in the 1981 election, and was named as Minister of Tourism and Recreation on February 13, 1982. He supported Roy McMurtry to succeed Davis as party leader in January 1985. When Frank Miller replaced Davis a premier of Ontario on February 8, 1985, he named Baetz as Provincial Secretary for Justice. He was again re-elected in the 1985 election, defeating Liberal candidate Alex Cullen by 2,948 votes.

At the provincial level, Miller's Conservatives were reduced to a fragile minority government in the 1985 election. Baetz was appointed as Minister of Intergovernmental Affairs on May 17, 1985, but accomplished little in this portfolio before the Conservatives were defeated in the house in June 1985. In opposition, he served as his party's critic for Intergovernmental Affairs, Child Care and Social Policy. He did not seek re-election in 1987.

=== Cabinet positions ===
Miller ministry, Province of Ontario (1985)
Cabinet posts (2)
Predecessor	Office	Successor
Frank Miller	Minister of Intergovernmental Affairs; 1985 (May–June)	David Peterson
Gordon Walker	Provincial Secretary for Justice; 1985 (February–May)	Alan Pope
Davis ministry, Province of Ontario (1971–1985)
Cabinet posts (3)
Predecessor	Office	Successor
Larry Grossman	Minister of Tourism and Recreation; 1982–1985	Claude Bennett
Bob Welch	Minister of Culture and Recreation; 1978–1982	Bruce McCaffrey
James Taylor	Minister of Energy; 1978 (January–August)	James Auld

== Later life ==
Baetz died on October 28, 1996. The Ontario legislative paid tribute to Baetz on November 4, 1996. The members who spoke remembered him as having a dignified, gentlemanly presence in the assembly.
