= Carleton (Ontario provincial electoral district) =

Provincial electoral district in Ontario, Canada

Coordinates: 45.169°N 75.637°W

Ontario electoral district
- Carleton in relation to other electoral districts in Ottawa

Provincial electoral district
- Legislature: Legislative Assembly of Ontario
MPP
George Darouze
Progressive Conservative
- District created: 1867
- First contested: 1867
- Last contested: 2025

Demographics
- Population (2016): 102,915
- Electors (2018): 81,901
- Area (km²): 1,187
- Pop. density (per km²): 86.7
- Census division: Ottawa
- Census subdivision: Ottawa

Carleton is a provincial electoral district in Ontario, Canada. It was created in 1867 at the time of confederation and lasted until provincial redistribution in 1996. In the 1999 provincial election it was redistributed into Nepean—Carleton and Lanark—Carleton. In 2007 it was abolished into Carleton—Mississippi Mills and Lanark—Frontenac—Lennox and Addington.

In 2018 it was re-created as the riding of Carleton from parts of Nepean—Carleton, Carleton—Mississippi Mills and Ottawa South.

== Boundaries ==
For the last three elections when Carleton existed (1987, 1990 and 1995) the riding included the municipalities of West Carleton Township, Goulbourn Township, Rideau Township, Osgoode Township and the city of Kanata. It was abolished in 1999 into Nepean—Carleton and Lanark—Carleton. The riding was re-created by the 2012 electoral redistribution from parts of Nepean—Carleton (59%), Carleton—Mississippi Mills (41%) and a small portion of Ottawa South.

== Members of Provincial Parliament ==
Assembly	Years	Member	Party
Carleton
1st	1867–1871	Robert Lyon	Liberal
2nd	1871–1874	George Monk	Conservative
3rd	1875–1879	George Monk	Conservative
4th	1879–1883	George Monk	Conservative
5th	1883–1886	George Monk	Conservative
6th	1886–1890	George Monk	Conservative
7th	1890–1894	George Monk	Conservative
8th	1894–1898	George Kidd	Conservative
9th	1898–1902	George Kidd	Conservative
10th	1902–1904	George Kidd	Conservative
11th	1905–1907	George Kidd	Conservative
11th	1907–1908	Robert McElroy	Conservative
12th	1908–1911	Robert McElroy	Conservative
13th	1911–1914	Robert McElroy	Conservative
14th	1914–1919	Robert McElroy	Conservative
15th	1919–1923	Robert Grant	United Farmers
16th	1923–1926	Adam Acres	Conservative
17th	1926–1929	Adam Acres	Conservative
18th	1929–1934	Adam Acres	Conservative
19th	1934–1937	Adam Acres	Conservative
20th	1937–1943	Adam Acres	Conservative
21st	1943–1945	Adam Acres	Conservative
22nd	1945–1948	Adam Acres	Conservative
23rd	1948–1951	Donald Morrow	Progressive Conservative
24th	1951–1955	Donald Morrow	Progressive Conservative
25th	1955–1959	William Johnston	Progressive Conservative
26th	1959–1963	William Johnston	Progressive Conservative
27th	1963–1967	William Johnston	Progressive Conservative
28th	1967–1971	William Johnston	Progressive Conservative
29th	1971–1975	Sid Handleman	Progressive Conservative
30th	1975–1977	Sid Handleman	Progressive Conservative
31st	1977–1980	Sid Handleman	Progressive Conservative
31st	1980–1981	Robert Mitchell	Progressive Conservative
32nd	1981–1985	Robert Mitchell	Progressive Conservative
33rd	1985–1987	Robert Mitchell	Progressive Conservative
34th	1987–1990	Norm Sterling	Progressive Conservative
35th	1990–1995	Norm Sterling	Progressive Conservative
36th	1995–1999	Norm Sterling	Progressive Conservative
Dissolved into Lanark—Carleton and Nepean—Carleton
Riding re-created from Nepean—Carleton, Carleton—Mississippi Mills, and Ottawa South
42nd	2018–2022	Goldie Ghamari	Progressive Conservative
43rd	2022–2024	Goldie Ghamari	Progressive Conservative
43rd	2024–2025	Goldie Ghamari	Independent
44th	2025–present	George Darouze	Progressive Conservative
Sourced from the Ontario Legislative Assembly

== Election results ==
=== 2018–present ===
Winning party in each polling division of Carleton at the 2025 Ontario general election

2025 Ontario general election
Party	Candidate	Votes	%	±%
Progressive Conservative	George Darouze	26,158	49.61	+1.47
Liberal	Brandon Bay	20,335	38.57	+11.68
New Democratic	Sherin Faili	3,763	7.14	–8.53
Green	Mystic Plaunt	956	1.81	–3.67
New Blue	Rob Stocki	699	1.33	–0.91
Ontario Party	Myles Dear	346	0.66	–0.41
Libertarian	Bruce Anthony Faulkner	263	0.50	–
Independent	Brian Hull	202	0.38	–
Total valid votes		52,722	99.53	
Total rejected, unmarked and declined ballots		251	0.47	+0.14
Turnout		52,973	47.10	–1.69
Eligible voters		112,480		
Progressive Conservative hold		Swing		–5.11
Source: Elections Ontario

Winning party in each polling division of Carleton at the 2022 Ontario general election

2022 Ontario general election
Party	Candidate	Votes	%	±%	Expenditures
Progressive Conservative	Goldie Ghamari	22,295	48.15	–3.18	$67,504
Liberal	Tom Dawson	12,452	26.89	+7.45	$28,703
New Democratic	Kevin St. Denis	7,256	15.67	–6.83	$14,674
Green	Cody Zulinski	2,537	5.48	+1.53	$5,201
New Blue	Rob Stocki	1,037	2.24	–	$2,991
Ontario Party	Ethan Ferguson	494	1.07	+0.27	$0
None of the Above	Chris Mark Beauchamp	235	0.51	–0.31	$0
Total valid votes/expense limit		46,306	99.66	–	$133,325
Total rejected, unmarked and declined ballots		157	0.34	–0.69	
Turnout		46,463	48.79	–13.21	
Eligible voters		95,232			
Progressive Conservative hold		Swing		–5.32	
Source: Elections Ontario

2018 Ontario general election
Party	Candidate	Votes	%	±%
Progressive Conservative	Goldie Ghamari	25,798	51.33	–1.67
New Democratic	Courtney Potter	11,308	22.50	+10.22
Liberal	Theresa Qadri	9,768	19.44	–8.49
Green	Gordon Kubanek	1,985	3.95	–1.89
None of the Above	Evan Nightingale	413	0.82	–
Ontario Party	Jay Tysick	399	0.79	–
Libertarian	Jean-Serge Brisson	386	0.77	–
Cultural Action	Kevin Harris	110	0.22	–
No Affiliation	Mark Dickson	91	0.18	–
Total valid votes		50,258	98.97	
Total rejected, unmarked and declined ballots		521	1.03	
Turnout		50,779	62.00	
Eligible voters		81,901		
Progressive Conservative hold		Swing		–5.95
Source: Elections Ontario

2014 general election redistributed results
Party	Vote	%
Progressive Conservative	20,990	53.09
Liberal	11,057	27.96
New Democratic	4,870	12.32
Green	2,315	5.85
Others	308	0.78

=== 1987–1995 ===
Consisting of West Carleton, Kanata, Goulbourn, Rideau and Osgoode.

1995 Ontario general election
Party	Candidate	Votes	%	±%
Progressive Conservative	Norman W. Sterling	28,349	64.96	+18.06
Liberal	Sam Spataro	9,743	22.33	-4.31
New Democratic	Cathy Hallessey	4,046	9.27	-17.18
Family Coalition	Janne Jardine-Campbell	942	2.16	
Libertarian	Barbara Rowe	293	0.67	
Natural Law	Richard Beecroft	265	0.61	
Total valid votes		43,638	99.36	
Total rejected, unmarked and declined ballots		279	0.64	-0.47
Turnout		43,917	62.05	-3.10
Eligible voters		70,780		
Progressive Conservative hold		Swing		+11.18
Source: Elections Ontario

1990 Ontario general election
Party	Candidate	Votes	%	±%
Progressive Conservative	Norman Sterling	17,869	46.91	+3.30
Liberal	Susan Lebrun	10,143	26.64	-15.52
New Democratic	Alex Munter	10,071	26.45	+12.21
Total valid votes		38,074	98.89	
Total rejected, unmarked and declined ballots		427	1.11	+0.71
Turnout		38,501	65.15	-0.07
Eligible voters		59,098		
Progressive Conservative hold		Swing		+9.41
Source: Elections Ontario

1987 Ontario general election
Party	Candidate	Votes	%
Progressive Conservative	Norman Sterling	14,057	43.61
Liberal	Roland Armitage	13,590	42.16
New Democratic	Elaine Gibson	4,590	14.24
Total valid votes		32,237	99.60
Total rejected, unmarked and declined ballots		130	0.40
Turnout		32,367	65.21
Eligible voters		49,632	
Source: Elections Ontario

=== 1975–1985 ===
From 1975 to 1987, the riding consisted of the former townships of Nepean and March. After 1987, only the parts of the riding in Kanata were transferred into the new riding of Carleton.

1995 Ontario general election
Party	Candidate	Votes	%	±%
Progressive Conservative	Norm Sterling	28,349	64.96	+18.06
Liberal	Sam Spataro	9,743	22.33	–4.31
New Democratic	Cathy Hallessey	4,046	9.27	–17.18
Family Coalition	Janne Jardine-Campbell	942	2.16	–
Libertarian	Barbara Rowe	293	0.67	–
Natural Law	Richard Beecroft	265	0.61	–
Total valid votes		43,638	99.36	
Total rejected, unmarked and declined ballots		279	0.64	–0.47
Turnout		43,917	62.05	–3.10
Eligible voters		70,780		
Progressive Conservative hold		Swing		+11.18
Source: Elections Ontario

1990 Ontario general election
Party	Candidate	Votes	%	±%
Progressive Conservative	Norm Sterling	17,860	46.91	+3.30
Liberal	Susan LeBrun	10,143	26.64	–15.52
New Democratic	Alex Munter	10,071	26.45	+12.21
Total valid votes		38,074	98.89	
Total rejected, unmarked and declined ballots		427	1.11	+0.79
Turnout		38,501	65.15	–0.01
Eligible voters		59,098		
Progressive Conservative hold		Swing		+9.41
Source: Elections Ontario

1987 Ontario general election
Party	Candidate	Votes	%	±%
Progressive Conservative	Norm Sterling	14,057	43.61	–0.74
Liberal	Roland Armitage	13,590	42.16	+4.41
New Democratic	Elaine Gibson	4,590	14.24	–3.68
Total valid votes		32,237	99.68	
Total rejected ballots		104	0.32	–0.20
Turnout		32,341	65.16	+7.37
Eligible voters		49,632		
Progressive Conservative hold		Swing		–2.58
Source: Elections Ontario

1985 Ontario general election
Party	Candidate	Votes	%	±%
Progressive Conservative	Robert C. Mitchell	17,732	44.34	–10.92
Liberal	Hans Daigeler	15,093	37.74	+11.05
New Democratic	Bea Murray	7,165	17.92	+1.05
Total valid votes		39,990	99.48	
Total rejected ballots		211	0.52	+0.22
Turnout		40,201	57.80	+4.63
Eligible voters		69,557		
Progressive Conservative hold		Swing		–10.98
Source: Elections Ontario

1981 Ontario general election
Party	Candidate	Votes	%	±%
Progressive Conservative	Robert C. Mitchell	17,846	55.26	+6.73
Liberal	Hans Daigeler	8,621	26.69	–7.54
New Democratic	Judy Wasylycia-Leis	5,446	16.86	+0.02
Independent	Andrew Dana Dynowski	383	1.19	–
Total valid votes		32,296	99.70	
Total rejected ballots		98	0.30	+0.07
Turnout		32,394	53.17	+11.21
Eligible voters		60,929		
Progressive Conservative hold		Swing		+7.14
Source: Elections Ontario

Ontario provincial by-election, November 20, 1980 Resignation of Sid Handleman
Party	Candidate	Votes	%	±%
Progressive Conservative	Robert C. Mitchell	11,891	48.53	+2.02
Liberal	Alvin Loney	8,389	34.24	+2.16
New Democratic	Judy Wasylycia-Leis	4,127	16.84	–4.57
Independent	John Turmel	95	0.39	–
Total valid votes		24,502	99.77	
Total rejected ballots		56	0.23	–0.11
Turnout		24,558	41.95	–20.92
Eligible voters		58,535		
Progressive Conservative hold		Swing		–0.07
Source: Elections Ontario

1977 Ontario general election
Party	Candidate	Votes	%	±%
Progressive Conservative	Sid Handleman	14,847	46.51	+7.64
Liberal	Eileen E. Consiglio	10,241	32.08	–4.71
New Democratic	Judy Wasylycia-Leis	6,837	21.42	–2.45
Total valid votes		31,925	99.66	
Total rejected ballots		108	0.34	–0.01
Turnout		32,033	62.88	–5.76
Eligible voters		50,946		
Progressive Conservative hold		Swing		+6.18
Source: Elections Ontario

1975 Ontario general election
Party	Candidate	Votes	%	±%
Progressive Conservative	Sid Handleman	12,653	38.87	–11.09
Liberal	Ben Franklin	11,977	36.79	+7.37
New Democratic	Gordon Kritsch	7,769	23.86	+3.23
Independent	Michael Sammon	157	0.48	–
Total valid votes		32,556	99.66	
Total rejected ballots		112	0.34	+0.15
Turnout		32,668	68.63	–5.15
Eligible voters		47,599		
Progressive Conservative hold		Swing		–9.23
Source: Elections Ontario

=== 1867–1975 ===
1971 Ontario general election
Party	Candidate	Votes	%	±%
Progressive Conservative	Sid Handleman	18,538	49.95	–1.03
Liberal	Frank Marchington	10,916	29.42	–3.08
New Democratic	Garth Stevenson	7,656	20.63	+4.11
Total valid votes		37,110	99.81	
Total rejected ballots		70	0.19	–0.07
Turnout		37,180	73.78	+11.70
Eligible voters		50,393		
Progressive Conservative hold		Swing		+1.02
Source: Elections Ontario

1967 Ontario general election
Party	Candidate	Votes	%	±%
Progressive Conservative	William Erskine Johnston	10,506	50.99	–6.15
Liberal	Frank Marchington	6,696	32.50	–4.88
New Democratic	David Bell	3,404	16.52	+11.02
Total valid votes		20,606	99.74	
Total rejected ballots		54	0.26	–0.16
Turnout		20,660	62.08	+1.12
Eligible voters		33,280		
Progressive Conservative hold		Swing		–0.64
Source: Elections Ontario

1963 Ontario general election
Party	Candidate	Votes	%	±%
Progressive Conservative	William Erskine Johnston	12,999	57.13	–2.72
Liberal	Frank Marchington	8,503	37.37	+2.38
New Democratic	Chris Orton	1,251	5.50	+2.02
Total valid votes		22,753	99.58	
Total rejected ballots		97	0.42	–0.80
Turnout		22,850	60.96	+11.72
Eligible voters		37,484		
Progressive Conservative hold		Swing		–2.55
Source: Elections Ontario

1959 Ontario general election
Party	Candidate	Votes	%	±%
Progressive Conservative	William Erskine Johnston	6,410	59.85	–3.80
Liberal	Harold Kay	3,748	35.00	–1.36
Co-operative Commonwealth	William A. Layman	373	3.48	–
Social Credit	Harold Herbert Splett	179	1.67	–
Total valid votes		10,710	98.77	
Total rejected ballots		133	1.23	+0.48
Turnout		10,843	49.24	–6.73
Eligible voters		22,021		
Progressive Conservative hold		Swing		–1.22
Source: Elections Ontario

1955 Ontario general election
Party	Candidate	Votes	%	±%
Progressive Conservative	William Erskine Johnston	5,153	63.65	+4.65
Liberal	H. J. Dillon	2,943	36.35	+6.67
Total valid votes		8,096	99.25	
Total rejected ballots		61	0.75	–0.72
Turnout		8,157	55.97	–8.03
Eligible voters		14,574		
Progressive Conservative hold		Swing		–1.01
Source: Elections Ontario

1951 Ontario general election
Party	Candidate	Votes	%	±%
Progressive Conservative	Donald Morrow	10,863	59.00	–2.88
Liberal	Thomas C. Keenan	5,465	29.68	+7.35
Co-operative Commonwealth	J. Harold Prevost	1,138	6.18	–7.73
Independent PC	Alfred E. Taylor	945	5.13	–
Total valid votes		18,411	98.53	
Total rejected ballots		275	1.47	+0.20
Turnout		18,686	64.00	+2.88
Eligible voters		29,196		
Progressive Conservative hold		Swing		–5.11
Source: Elections Ontario

1948 Ontario general election
Party	Candidate	Votes	%	±%
Progressive Conservative	Donald Morrow	9,343	61.88	+2.08
Liberal	John Hamilton Chanonhouse	3,372	22.33	–4.38
Co-operative Commonwealth	Alexander MacCordick	2,100	13.91	+0.42
Social Credit	Thomas Edward Robertson	284	1.88	–
Total valid votes		15,099	98.73	
Total rejected ballots		194	1.27	+0.48
Turnout		15,293	61.12	–10.26
Eligible voters		25,020		
Progressive Conservative hold		Swing		+3.23
Source: Elections Ontario

1945 Ontario general election
Party	Candidate	Votes	%	±%
Progressive Conservative	Adam Acres	9,495	59.80	+5.01
Liberal	Robert Green	4,242	26.72	–4.23
Co-operative Commonwealth	Alexander MacCordick	2,141	13.48	–0.77
Total valid votes		15,878	99.21	
Total rejected ballots		127	0.79	+0.11
Turnout		16,005	71.39	+19.81
Eligible voters		22,420		
Progressive Conservative hold		Swing		+4.62
Source: Elections Ontario

1943 Ontario general election
Party	Candidate	Votes	%	±%
Progressive Conservative	Adam Acres	5,796	54.79	–3.62
Liberal	Godfrey Duckwith Armitage	3,274	30.95	–0.07
Co-operative Commonwealth	James Dickson Forsyth	1,508	14.26	–
Total valid votes		10,578	99.31	
Total rejected ballots		73	0.69	–0.17
Turnout		10,651	51.57	–15.19
Eligible voters		20,652		
Progressive Conservative hold		Swing		+1.85
Source: Elections Ontario

1937 Ontario general election
Party	Candidate	Votes	%	±%
Conservative	Adam Acres	6,956	58.41	+2.05
Liberal	Roy Knight Aseltyne	3,694	31.02	–12.62
Independent Liberal	Leonard Anthony Davis	1,258	10.56	–
Total valid votes		11,908	99.14	
Total rejected ballots		103	0.86	+0.27
Turnout		12,011	66.76	–5.97
Eligible voters		17,991		
Conservative hold		Swing		+7.33
Source: Elections Ontario

1934 Ontario general election
Party	Candidate	Votes	%	±%
Conservative	Adam Acres	6,842	56.36	–10.79
Liberal	Huntley M. Sinclair	5,297	43.64	–
Total valid votes		12,139	99.41	
Total rejected ballots		72	0.59	+0.39
Turnout		12,211	72.73	+24.97
Eligible voters		16,789		
Conservative hold		Swing		–5.40
Source: Elections Ontario

1929 Ontario general election
Party	Candidate	Votes	%	±%
Conservative	Adam Acres	3,781	67.16	+6.97
Prohibitionist	William Egbert Stratton	1,849	32.84	–
Total valid votes		5,630	99.81	
Total rejected ballots		11	0.20	–0.32
Turnout		5,641	47.76	–13.26
Eligible voters		11,811		
Conservative hold		Swing		+3.49
Source: Elections Ontario

1926 Ontario general election
Party	Candidate	Votes	%	±%
Conservative	Adam Acres	4,530	60.18	–1.04
Liberal–Progressive	Forest S. Caldwell	2,997	39.82	–
Total valid votes		7,527	99.48	
Total rejected ballots		39	0.52	–1.92
Turnout		7,566	61.02	–3.92
Eligible voters		12,399		
Conservative hold		Swing		–0.52
Source: Elections Ontario

1923 Ontario general election
Party	Candidate	Votes	%	±%
Conservative	Adam Acres	4,813	61.22	–
United Farmers	Robert Henry Grant	3,049	38.78	–
Total valid votes		7,862	97.57	
Total rejected ballots		196	2.43	–
Turnout		8,058	64.94	–
Eligible voters		12,409		
Conservative gain from United Farmers		Swing		–
Source: Elections Ontario

Ontario provincial by-election, December 15, 1919 Ministerial by-election
Party	Candidate	Votes	%	±%
United Farmers	Robert Henry Grant	acclaimed		
Source: Elections Ontario

1919 Ontario general election
Party	Candidate	Votes	%	±%
United Farmers	Robert Henry Grant	4,877	56.24	–
Conservative	Adam Acres	3,795	43.76	–32.16
Total valid votes		8,672	96.88	
Total rejected ballots		279	3.12	+3.03
Turnout		8,951	67.89	+14.59
Eligible voters		13,184		
United Farmers gain from Conservative		Swing		–
Source: Elections Ontario

1914 Ontario general election
Party	Candidate	Votes	%	±%
Conservative	Robert Herbert McElroy	1,712	75.92	+15.79
Liberal	R. B. Hamilton	543	24.08	–15.79
Total valid votes		2,255	99.91	
Total rejected ballots		2	0.09	–0.36
Turnout		2,257	53.31	–34.93
Eligible voters		4,234		
Conservative hold		Swing		+15.79
Source: Elections Ontario

1911 Ontario general election
Party	Candidate	Votes	%	±%
Conservative	Robert Herbert McElroy	1,347	60.13	–2.08
Liberal	Clarke Craig	893	39.87	+2.08
Total valid votes		2,240	99.56	
Total rejected ballots		10	0.44	+0.31
Turnout		2,250	88.24	+36.56
Eligible voters		2,550		
Conservative hold		Swing		–2.08
Source: Elections Ontario

1908 Ontario general election
Party	Candidate	Votes	%	±%
Conservative	Robert Herbert McElroy	1,352	62.22	–0.64
Liberal	William Henry Hartin	821	37.78	+0.64
Total valid votes		2,173	99.86	
Total rejected ballots		3	0.14	+0.14
Turnout		2,176	51.67	–
Eligible voters		4,211		
Conservative hold		Swing		–0.64
Source: Elections Ontario

Ontario provincial by-election, March 18, 1907 death of George Nelson Kidd
Party	Candidate	Votes	%	±%
Conservative	Robert Herbert McElroy	1,625	62.86	–15.82
Liberal	William H. Hartin	960	37.14	+15.82
Total valid votes		2,585	100.00	
Total rejected ballots		–		
Turnout		2,585	–	–
Eligible voters				
Conservative hold		Swing		–15.82
Source: Elections Ontario

1905 Ontario general election
Party	Candidate	Votes	%	±%
Conservative	George Nelson Kidd	1,617	78.69	+6.12
Liberal	J. Campbell Smith	438	21.31	–6.12
Total valid votes		2,055	100.00	
Total rejected ballots		–		
Turnout		2,055	42.74	–11.94
Eligible voters		4,808		
Conservative hold		Swing		+6.12
Source: Elections Ontario

1902 Ontario general election
Party	Candidate	Votes	%	±%
Conservative	George Nelson Kidd	1,971	72.57	+8.93
Liberal	D. H. McLean	745	27.43	–8.93
Total valid votes		2,716	99.34	
Total rejected ballots		18	0.66	+0.51
Turnout		2,734	54.68	–0.70
Eligible voters		5,000		
Conservative gain from Independent Conservative		Swing		+8.93
Source: Elections Ontario

1898 Ontario general election
Party	Candidate	Votes	%	±%
Independent Conservative	George Nelson Kidd	1,740	63.64	+0.03
Liberal	Mr. Buckham	994	36.36	–
Total valid votes		2,734	99.85	
Total rejected ballots		4	0.15	–0.52
Turnout		2,738	55.38	–12.69
Eligible voters		4,944		
Conservative-Patron notional hold		Swing		+0.01
Source: Elections Ontario

1894 Ontario general election
Party	Candidate	Votes	%	±%
Conservative-Patron	George Nelson Kidd	1,986	63.61	+13.81
Conservative	George William Monk	1,136	36.39	–13.81
Total valid votes		3,122	99.33	
Total rejected ballots		21	0.67	–0.11
Turnout		3,143	68.07	+22.51
Eligible voters		4,617		
Conservative-Patron gain from Conservative		Swing		–
Source: Elections Ontario

1890 Ontario general election
Party	Candidate	Votes	%	±%
Conservative	George William Monk	1,145	50.20	–25.21
Liberal	George Nelson Kidd	1,136	49.80	+25.21
Total valid votes		2,281	99.22	
Total rejected ballots		18	0.78	+0.58
Turnout		2,299	45.56	–0.23
Eligible voters		5,046		
Conservative hold		Swing		–25.21
Source: Elections Ontario

1886 Ontario general election
Party	Candidate	Votes	%	±%
Conservative	George William Monk	1,824	75.40	–1.13
Liberal	J. Henderson	595	24.60	+14.43
Total valid votes		2,419	99.79	
Total rejected ballots		5	0.21	–0.64
Turnout		2,424	45.79	–5.93
Eligible voters		5,294		
Conservative hold		Swing		–7.78
Source: Elections Ontario

1883 Ontario general election
Party	Candidate	Votes	%	±%
Conservative	George William Monk	1,302	55.86	–23.88
Conservative	W. Clark	482	20.68	–59.06
Independent	E. Mohr	310	13.30	–
Liberal	J. Hodgins	237	10.17	–10.09
Total valid votes		2,331	99.15	
Total rejected ballots		20	0.85	+0.85
Turnout		2,351	51.72	–3.75
Eligible voters		4,546		
Conservative hold		Swing		+17.59
Source: Elections Ontario

1879 Ontario general election
Party	Candidate	Votes	%
Conservative	George William Monk	2,074	79.74
Liberal	C. Christian	527	20.26
Total valid votes		2,601	55.47
Eligible voters		4,689	
Conservative hold			
Source: Elections Ontario

1875 Ontario general election
Party	Candidate	Votes
Conservative	George William Monk	Acclaimed
Source: Elections Ontario

Ontario provincial by-election, January 1872 Previous election voided
Party	Candidate	Votes	%	±%
Conservative	George William Monk	1,109	54.23	+9.24
Liberal	Robert Lyon	936	45.77	−1.52
Total valid votes		2,045	100.0	−2.01
Conservative gain from Liberal		Swing		+5.38
Source: History of the Electoral Districts, Legislatures and Ministries of the Province of Ontario

1871 Ontario general election
Party	Candidate	Votes	%
Conservative	George William Monk	822	50.31
Liberal	Robert Lyon	812	49.69
Turnout		1,634	63.46
Eligible voters		2,575	
Election voided
Source: Elections Ontario

1867 Ontario general election
Party	Candidate	Votes	%
Liberal	Robert Lyon	987	47.29
Conservative	J. Skead	939	44.99
Independent	Mr. Eastman	161	7.71
Total valid votes		2,087	88.13
Eligible voters		2,368	
Liberal pickup new district.			
Source: Elections Ontario

== Nomination contests ==
PC Carleton nomination contest: December 8, 2024

Candidate
Candidate	%
George Darouze	96
Jennifer Jennekens	4
Total	100

== See also ==
- List of Ontario provincial electoral districts
- Canadian provincial electoral districts
