= William Erskine Johnston =

Canadian politician (1905–1993)

William Johnston

Ontario MPP
- In office 1955–1971
- Preceded by: Donald Morrow
- Succeeded by: Sid Handleman
- Constituency: Carleton

Personal details
- Born: May 5, 1905 Carp, Ontario
- Died: November 24, 1993 (aged 88) Ottawa, Ontario
- Party: Progressive Conservative
- Spouse: Aleta Charlotte Bishop

William Erskine Johnston (May 5, 1905 – November 24, 1993) was a Canadian politician who represented Carleton in the Legislative Assembly of Ontario from 1955 to 1971 as a Progressive Conservative member.

== Career ==
Originally elected in the general election in 1955, he was re-elected in the general elections in 1959, 1963 and 1967. Despite his lengthy political service, Johnston never served in Cabinet, nor as a Parliamentary Assistant, but he did serve on over 40 Standing Committees. Johnston retired from politics in 1971. W. Erskine Johnston Public School, which opened in 1969 in the Ottawa suburb of Kanata, and W. Erskine Johnston Arena, built in Carp, Ontario during the early 1980's to serve West Carleton Township, were named after Johnston in recognition of his long public service.

== Personal life ==
Johnston was married to Aleta Charlotte Bishop (b.1913 – d.1994).

== Death ==
Johnston died at an Ottawa hospital in 1993 and was buried at St. James Cemetery, Carp, Ontario.
