= Robert Henry Grant =

Canadian politician (1860–1930)

Robert Grant

Ontario MPP
- In office 1919–1923
- Preceded by: Robert Herbert McElroy
- Succeeded by: Adam Acres
- Constituency: Carleton

Personal details
- Born: August 5, 1860 Ottawa, Canada West
- Died: November 26, 1930 (aged 70) near Hazeldean, Ontario
- Party: United Farmers of Ontario
- Spouse(s): Sara Christiana Cuddie (1886-1887); Sarah Maria Gourlay (1897-1927)
- Children: 9
- Parent: Robert Grant (1793-1870) (father)
- Occupation: Farmer

Robert Henry Grant (August 5, 1860 – November 26, 1930) was a politician in Ontario, Canada. He was a United Farmer member of the Legislative Assembly of Ontario from 1919 to 1923. He represented the riding of Carleton. He served as a cabinet minister in the government of E.C. Drury. Robert Grant Avenue in the Fernbank neighbourhood of Stittsville is named after Grant and his father. The nearby Grant Crossing shopping area is also named after the family farm which once stood on the land.

== Background ==
Grant was born in Ottawa.

In 1909, he was among those who formed the Hazeldean Rural Telephone Company, a cooperative telephone system in which every subscriber was a shareholder. He was one of the original directors of this company which provided telephone service to the Stittsville/Hazeldean and surrounding area right up until it was sold to the Bell Telephone Company in 1958.

Robert H. Grant was a member of the Goodwood Masonic Lodge in Richmond, serving as Master of the Lodge in 1896 and 1897. He later became a charter member of Hazeldean Lodge No. 517 when it was founded in 1914. In 1917, he served as the District Deputy Grant Master for the Ottawa area.

== Politics ==
Grant was the United Farmers of Ontario Member of the Legislative Assembly of Ontario for Carleton from 1919 to 1923. From 1919 to 1923, he was the Minister of Education in the cabinet of Ernest Charles Drury. He also served 12 years as county auditor and ten years as a local license commissioner.

=== Cabinet positions ===
Drury ministry, Province of Ontario (1919–1923)
Cabinet post (1)
Predecessor	Office	Successor
Henry John Cody	Minister of Education; 1919-1923	Howard Ferguson
