= George Nelson Kidd =

Canadian politician (1864–1907)

George Kidd

Ontario MPP
- In office 1894–1907
- Preceded by: George Monk
- Succeeded by: Robert McElroy
- Constituency: Carleton

Personal details
- Born: October 1, 1864 Carp, Canada West
- Died: February 9, 1907 (aged 42)
- Party: Conservative
- Spouse: Esther Alvira Young
- Relations: Edward Kidd, cousin

George Nelson Kidd (October 1, 1864 – February 9, 1907) was an Ontario farmer and political figure. He represented Carleton in the Legislative Assembly of Ontario from 1894 to 1907 as a Conservative-Patrons of Industry, then Independent Conservative and finally as a Conservative member.

He was born in Carp, Canada West, the son of Richard Kidd, an Irish immigrant, and educated at Carp and in Kingston. Kidd served as reeve of Huntley Township from 1889 to 1894. He was also president for the Huntley Agricultural Fair. Kidd married Esther Alvira Young. His cousin Edward Kidd represented Carleton in the House of Commons of Canada during the same time period.
