= Ottawa West (provincial electoral district) =

Former electoral district in Ontario, Canada

Ontario electoral district

Defunct provincial electoral district
- Legislature: Legislative Assembly of Ontario
- District created: 1908
- District abolished: 1999
- First contested: 1908
- Last contested: 1997

Ottawa West was a provincial electoral district in Ontario, Canada, that was represented in the Legislative Assembly of Ontario from 1908 to 1926 and from 1955 to 1999. It covered the western part of the Ottawa area.

== Members of Provincial Parliament ==
The provincial district of Ottawa West elected the following members of the Legislative Assembly of Ontario:

Assembly	Years	Member	Party
12th	1908–1911	Alfred Ernest Fripp	Conservative
13th	1911–1914	James A. Ellis	Conservative
14th	1914–1919	George Charles Hurdman	Liberal
15th	1919–1923	Hamnett Pinhey Hill	Conservative
16th	1923–1926	Harold Fisher	Liberal
Riding dissolved into Ottawa South and Ottawa North
Riding re-created
25th	1955–1959	Donald Morrow	Progressive Conservative
26th	1959–1963	Donald Morrow	Progressive Conservative
27th	1963–1967	Donald Morrow	Progressive Conservative
28th	1967–1971	Donald Morrow	Progressive Conservative
29th	1971–1975	Donald Morrow	Progressive Conservative
30th	1975–1977	Donald Morrow	Progressive Conservative
31st	1977–1981	Reuben Baetz	Progressive Conservative
32nd	1981–1985	Reuben Baetz	Progressive Conservative
33rd	1985–1987	Reuben Baetz	Progressive Conservative
34th	1987–1990	Bob Chiarelli	Liberal
35th	1987–1990	Bob Chiarelli	Liberal
36th	1990–1995	Bob Chiarelli	Liberal
37th	1995–1997	Bob Chiarelli	Liberal
37th	1997–1998	Alex Cullen	Liberal
37th	1998–1998	Alex Cullen	Independent
37th	1998–1999	Alex Cullen	New Democratic
Riding dissolved into Ottawa West—Nepean

== Election results ==
=== 1955–1999 ===
Ontario provincial by-election, September 4, 1997 Resignation of Bob Chiarelli
Party	Candidate	Votes	%	±%
Liberal	Alex Cullen	11,438	52.90	+7.42
Progressive Conservative	Chris Thompson	7,217	33.38	–7.03
New Democratic	Katrina Prystupa	2,573	11.90	+0.25
Independent	John Turmel	201	0.93	–
Green	Gene Villeneuve	193	0.89	–0.51
Total valid votes		21,622	99.26	
Total rejected, unmarked and declined ballots		162	0.74	–0.24
Turnout		21,784	47.67	–16.77
Eligible voters		45,701		
Liberal hold		Swing		+7.23
Source: Elections Ontario

1995 Ontario general election
Party	Candidate	Votes	%	±%
Liberal	Bob Chiarelli	14,516	45.48	+3.87
Progressive Conservative	Greg Joy	12,898	40.41	+13.28
New Democratic	Karim Ismaili	3,718	11.65	–13.46
Green	Stephen Johns	448	1.40	–1.62
Independent	Andy Sammon	241	0.76	–
Natural Law	Stan Lamothe	96	0.30	–
Total valid votes		31,917	99.02	
Total rejected, unmarked and declined ballots		317	0.98	–0.30
Turnout		32,234	64.43	–1.25
Eligible voters		50,027		
Liberal hold		Swing		–4.71
Source: Elections Ontario

1990 Ontario general election
Party	Candidate	Votes	%	±%
Liberal	Bob Chiarelli	13,908	41.61	–8.85
Progressive Conservative	Brian Mackey	9,068	27.13	–3.59
New Democratic	Allan Edwards	8,391	25.11	+11.51
Confederation of Regions	David Kenneth Boyd	1,044	3.12	–
Green	Ian Whyte	1,011	3.02	–
Total valid votes		33,422	98.72	
Total rejected, unmarked and declined ballots		433	1.28	+0.67
Turnout		33,855	65.68	+4.17
Eligible voters		51,542		
Liberal hold		Swing		–2.63
Source: Elections Ontario

1987 Ontario general election
Party	Candidate	Votes	%	±%
Liberal	Bob Chiarelli	16,343	50.46	+12.94
Progressive Conservative	Derek Insley	9,951	30.73	–15.91
New Democratic	Paul Weinzweig	4,403	13.60	–0.09
Family Coalition	Lynn McPherson	1,689	5.22	–
Total valid votes		32,386	99.39	
Total rejected ballots		200	0.61	+0.07
Turnout		32,586	61.51	+2.22
Eligible voters		52,977		
Liberal gain from Progressive Conservative		Swing		+14.42
Source: Elections Ontario

1985 Ontario general election
Party	Candidate	Votes	%	±%
Progressive Conservative	Reuben Baetz	15,089	46.63	–12.67
Liberal	Alex Cullen	12,141	37.52	+6.50
New Democratic	Greg Ross	4,427	13.68	+5.69
Green	Gregory Hugh Vezina	701	2.17	–
Total valid votes		32,358	99.46	
Total rejected ballots		177	0.54	+0.12
Turnout		32,535	59.29	+3.49
Eligible voters		54,873		
Progressive Conservative hold		Swing		–9.58
Source: Elections Ontario

1981 Ontario general election
Party	Candidate	Votes	%	±%
Progressive Conservative	Reuben Baetz	17,418	59.30	+13.51
Liberal	George Anderson	9,112	31.02	+2.19
New Democratic	Lofty MacMillan	2,348	7.99	–17.38
Independent	Dale E. Alkerton	494	1.68	–
Total valid votes		29,372	99.58	
Total rejected ballots		124	0.42	+0.20
Turnout		29,496	55.80	–10.23
Eligible voters		52,863		
Progressive Conservative hold		Swing		+5.66
Source: Elections Ontario

1977 Ontario general election
Party	Candidate	Votes	%	±%
Progressive Conservative	Reuben Baetz	15,729	45.79	+1.44
Liberal	Bill Roberts	9,906	28.84	–0.43
New Democratic	Marion Dewar	8,718	25.38	–1.01
Total valid votes		34,353	99.78	
Total rejected ballots		75	0.22	–0.02
Turnout		34,428	66.03	–0.00
Eligible voters		52,139		
Progressive Conservative hold		Swing		+0.94
Source: Elections Ontario

1975 Ontario general election
Party	Candidate	Votes	%	±%
Progressive Conservative	Donald Morrow	14,889	44.34	–1.19
Liberal	Walter Ryan	9,826	29.26	+3.68
New Democratic	Sue Findlay	8,861	26.39	–2.49
Total valid votes		33,576	99.76	
Total rejected ballots		81	0.24	–0.09
Turnout		33,657	66.03	–8.81
Eligible voters		50,969		
Progressive Conservative hold		Swing		–2.44
Source: Elections Ontario

1971 Ontario general election
Party	Candidate	Votes	%	±%
Progressive Conservative	Donald Morrow	18,349	45.54	–3.88
New Democratic	Ralph Sutherland	11,637	28.88	+4.51
Liberal	Howard Henry	10,308	25.58	–0.64
Total valid votes		40,294	99.67	
Total rejected ballots		132	0.33	–0.00
Turnout		40,426	74.85	+14.04
Eligible voters		54,012		
Progressive Conservative hold		Swing		–4.19
Source: Elections Ontario

1967 Ontario general election
Party	Candidate	Votes	%	±%
Progressive Conservative	Donald Morrow	12,707	49.41	–6.34
Liberal	William Bangs	6,743	26.22	–14.15
New Democratic	Julian Gwyn	6,266	24.37	+20.49
Total valid votes		25,716	99.67	
Total rejected ballots		85	0.33	–0.06
Turnout		25,801	60.81	–2.51
Eligible voters		42,432		
Progressive Conservative hold		Swing		+3.90
Source: Elections Ontario

1963 Ontario general election
Party	Candidate	Votes	%	±%
Progressive Conservative	Donald Morrow	11,048	55.76	+4.32
Liberal	Victor D. Hossack	7,999	40.37	–2.33
New Democratic	Stewart I. Crawford	768	3.88	–1.98
Total valid votes		19,815	99.61	
Total rejected ballots		77	0.39	–0.48
Turnout		19,892	63.32	+5.03
Eligible voters		31,415		
Progressive Conservative hold		Swing		+3.33
Source: Elections Ontario

1959 Ontario general election
Party	Candidate	Votes	%	±%
Progressive Conservative	Donald Morrow	8,505	51.44	–6.46
Liberal	Victor D. Hossack	7,061	42.70	+8.38
Co-operative Commonwealth	Patrick Daniel	969	5.86	–1.92
Total valid votes		16,535	99.14	
Total rejected ballots		144	0.86	–0.23
Turnout		16,679	58.29	+1.54
Eligible voters		28,612		
Progressive Conservative hold		Swing		–7.42
Source: Elections Ontario

1955 Ontario general election
Party	Candidate	Votes	%	±%
Progressive Conservative	Donald Morrow	8,513	57.90	–
Liberal	Vincent Kelly	5,046	34.32	–
Co-operative Commonwealth	Walter Beresford Mann	1,144	7.78	–
Total valid votes		14,703	98.90	
Total rejected ballots		163	1.10	–1.76
Turnout		14,866	56.76	+14.99
Eligible voters		26,192		
Progressive Conservative notional hold		Swing		–
Source: Elections Ontario

=== 1908–1927 ===
1923 Ontario general election
Party	Candidate	Votes	%	±%
Liberal	Harold Fisher	7,362	40.15	+14.82
Conservative	Albert Edwin Honeywell	6,470	35.29	+0.53
Labour	John Cameron	2,086	11.38	–19.12
Conservative	Arthur Ellis	1,154	6.29	–28.46
Independent	Thomas Clarey	1,136	6.20	–
Independent	John H. Sproul	127	0.69	–
Total valid votes		18,335	97.14	
Total rejected ballots		539	2.86	–2.82
Turnout		18,874	41.77	–26.34
Eligible voters		45,187		
Liberal gain from Conservative		Swing		+16.97
Source: Elections Ontario

1919 Ontario general election
Party	Candidate	Votes	%	±%
Conservative	Hamnett Pinhey Hill	8,953	34.76	–14.65
Labour	John Cameron	7,856	30.50	–
Liberal	George Charles Hurdman	6,526	25.34	–25.26
Independent	Justerna Sears	2,423	9.41	–
Total valid votes		25,758	94.32	
Total rejected ballots		1,551	5.68	+4.87
Turnout		27,309	68.11	+10.79
Eligible voters		40,098		
Conservative gain from Liberal		Swing		–7.32
Source: Elections Ontario

1914 Ontario general election
Party	Candidate	Votes	%	±%
Liberal	George Charles Hurdman	5,028	50.59	+16.29
Conservative	James A. Ellis	4,910	49.41	–16.29
Total valid votes		9,938	99.19	
Total rejected ballots		81	0.81	+0.17
Turnout		10,019	57.32	+8.90
Eligible voters		17,479		
Liberal gain from Conservative		Swing		+16.29
Source: Elections Ontario

1911 Ontario general election
Party	Candidate	Votes	%	±%
Conservative	James A. Ellis	4,398	65.70	+10.66
Liberal	Gordon Smith Henderson	2,296	34.30	–10.66
Total valid votes		6,694	99.36	
Total rejected ballots		43	0.64	–0.39
Turnout		6,737	48.42	–23.44
Eligible voters		13,915		
Conservative hold		Swing		+10.66
Source: Elections Ontario

1908 Ontario general election
Party	Candidate	Votes	%
Conservative	Alfred Ernest Fripp	4,806	55.04
Liberal	George Samuel May	3,926	44.96
Total valid votes		8,732	98.97
Total rejected ballots		91	1.03
Turnout		8,823	71.86
Eligible voters		12,278	
Conservative pickup new district.			
Source: Elections Ontario

== See also ==
- List of Ontario provincial electoral districts
- Canadian provincial electoral districts
