= Robert Lyon (politician) =

Canadian judge and politician

Ontario MPP
- In office 1867–1871
- Preceded by: Riding established
- Succeeded by: George Monk
- Constituency: Carleton

6th Mayor of Ottawa
- In office 1867–1867
- Preceded by: Moss Kent Dickinson
- Succeeded by: John Rochester

Personal details
- Born: July 6, 1829
- Died: March 21, 1888 (aged 58) Ottawa, Ontario
- Party: Liberal
- Relations: George Byron Lyon, brother
- Occupation: Lawyer

Robert Lyon (July 6, 1829 - March 21, 1888) was a lawyer, politician and judge in the County of Carleton in eastern Ontario. He was mayor of Ottawa in 1867 and a Liberal member of the Legislative Assembly of Ontario from 1867 to 1871.

His father, George Lyon, was a Scottish captain in the British army, who settled in Richmond, Ontario. His oldest brother was George Byron Lyon, another mayor of Ottawa. Robert was born in the village of Richmond in 1829.

He studied law and was called to the bar in 1853. He began practicing law in Ottawa in 1856. He became an alderman and later mayor. Lyon also represented Carleton in the Ontario legislature from 1867 to 1871. He was named a judge for Carleton County in 1873.

Lyon street in downtown Ottawa is named after the family, as is the underground Lyon Station on the Confederation line of Ottawa's light rail system.

== Electoral history ==
1867 Ontario general election: Carleton
Party	Candidate	Votes	%
Liberal	Robert Lyon	987	47.29
Conservative	J. Skead	939	44.99
Independent	Mr. Eastman	161	7.71
Total valid votes		2,087	88.13
Eligible voters		2,368	
Liberal pickup new district.			
Source: Elections Ontario

1871 Ontario general election: Carleton
Party	Candidate	Votes	%
Conservative	George William Monk	822	50.31
Liberal	Robert Lyon	812	49.69
Turnout		1,634	63.46
Eligible voters		2,575	
Election voided
Source: Elections Ontario

Ontario provincial by-election, January 1872: Carleton Previous election voided
Party	Candidate	Votes	%	±%
Conservative	George William Monk	1,109	54.23	+9.24
Liberal	Robert Lyon	936	45.77	−1.52
Total valid votes		2,045	100.0	−2.01
Conservative gain from Liberal		Swing		+5.38
Source: History of the Electoral Districts, Legislatures and Ministries of the Province of Ontario
