= Donald Morrow =

Canadian politician

Ontario MPP
- In office 1955–1977
- Preceded by: Riding reestablished
- Succeeded by: Reuben Baetz
- Constituency: Ottawa West
- In office 1948–1955
- Preceded by: Adam Acres
- Succeeded by: William Johnston
- Constituency: Carleton

Personal details
- Born: December 19, 1908 Winchester Springs, Ontario
- Died: March 29, 1995 (aged 86) Ottawa, Ontario
- Party: Progressive Conservative
- Occupation: Teacher
- Nickname: Don Morrow

Military service
- Allegiance: Canadian
- Branch/service: Army, RCAF
- Years of service: 1941–1946
- Rank: Lieutenant, Flight Lieutenant

Donald Hugo Morrow (December 19, 1908 – March 29, 1995) was a politician in Ontario, Canada of Scottish descent. He served as a Progressive Conservative member of the Legislative Assembly of Ontario. He represented the ridings of Carleton from 1948 to 1955 and Ottawa West from 1955 to 1977. From 1963 to 1967 he was Speaker of the Legislative Assembly of Ontario.

== Background ==
Morrow was born in Winchester Springs, Ontario and was educated at local schools and at Queen's University. From 1929 to 1954, he was a teacher and later principal with the Ottawa School Board. Morrow served with the Canadian Army and Royal Canadian Air Force during World War II. In 1978, he was named to the Social Assistance Review Board. He died in Ottawa at the age of 86.

== Politics ==
Morrow ran in the 1948 provincial election in the Ottawa area riding of Carleton as the Progressive Conservative candidate. He defeated J. Chnonhouse by 5, 874 votes. He was re-elected in 1951 and again in 1955 in the nearby riding of Ottawa West. He continued to serve until 1977. For his entire time in the legislature he sat as a backbench supporter of the governments of Leslie Frost, John Robarts and Bill Davis. Morrow's father campaigned for John A. Macdonald.

On October 29, 1963, Morrow was appointed as Speaker of the House. He served as speaker until 1967.

During his time as MPP he was credited with creating a psychiatric unit at the Royal Ottawa Hospital and securing the land where Algonquin College was built.
