= Robert Herbert McElroy =

Canadian politician

Robert McElroy

Ontario MPP
- In office 1907–1919
- Preceded by: George Kidd
- Succeeded by: Robert Grant
- Constituency: Carleton

Personal details
- Born: January 27, 1860 Richmond, Canada West
- Died: January 20, 1920 (aged 59) Ottawa, Ontario
- Party: Conservative
- Occupation: Merchant

Robert Herbert McElroy (January 27, 1860 – January 20, 1920) was an Ontario merchant and political figure. He represented Carleton in the Legislative Assembly of Ontario as a Conservative member from 1907 to 1919.

He was born in Richmond, Canada West, the son of Henry McElroy, and educated in Richmond and at the Ottawa Collegiate Institute. In 1887, he married Helen E. Baird. McElroy owned a general store, operated a flour mill and was a grain dealer. He served as reeve for Richmond from 1897 to 1903. McElroy was elected to the provincial assembly in a 1907 by-election held after the death of George Nelson Kidd. He also served as a director for the Central Canada Exhibition. McElroy was named registrar for Carleton County in 1919. He died of pneumonia at his home in Ottawa in 1920.
