= Hamnett Pinhey Hill =

Canadian politician

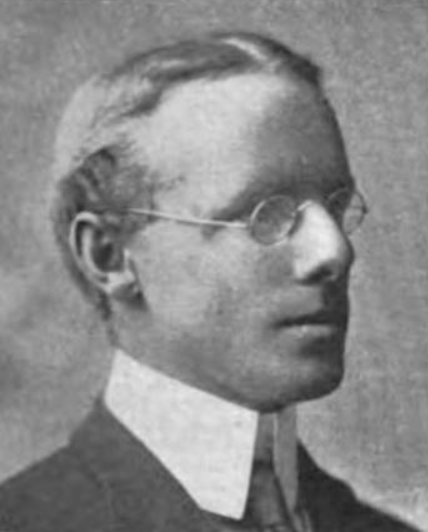

MPP for Ottawa West
- In office October 20, 1919 – May 10, 1923

Personal details
- Born: December 18, 1876 Ottawa, Ontario
- Died: December 15, 1942 (aged 65) Ottawa, Ontario
- Party: Progressive Conservative Party of Ontario

Hamnett Pinhey Hill (December 18, 1876 – December 15, 1942) was an Ontario lawyer and political figure. He represented Ottawa West in the Legislative Assembly of Ontario from 1919 to 1923 as a Conservative member.

== Biography ==
He was born in Ottawa, the son of Hamnett Pinhey Hill (1845-1879) and Margaret Christie, and the grandson of Dr. Hamnett Hill, M.R.C.S. (b.1811, England; d.1898, Ottawa) and Mary Anne Pinhey, second daughter of Hon. Hamnett Kirkes Pinhey (b. England, 1784; d. Ontario, 1857). Hill was educated in Ottawa and at Toronto University In 1907, he married Beatrice Sara Lindsay. He was a lieutenant in the Army Service Corps. Hill was the author of Robert Randall and the Le Breton Flats, which described the controversy around the sale of the Lebreton Flats property formerly owned by Robert Randal. He died in 1942 in Ottawa.
