= Norman Rawson =

Reverend Norman Rawson was a World War I veteran, attaining the rank of captain, and minister at Centenary Church in Hamilton, Ontario from 1937 until 1954. In 1938, he was a candidate in the 1938 Conservative Party of Ontario leadership convention receiving 22 votes and coming in last of four candidates behind the winner, George Drew. He subsequently became a speaker for the Leadership League, a conservative movement established by The Globe and Mail publisher George McCullagh, which proposed one party rule in Canada under direction of business leaders.
