= Goldie Ghamari =

Canadian politician and activist

- Ghamari in 2022

Member of the Ontario Provincial Parliament for Carleton
- In office June 7, 2018 – February 27, 2025
- Preceded by: Riding re-established
- Succeeded by: George Darouze

Personal details
- Born: Golsa Ghamari; March 28, 1985 (age 41) Iran
- Party: Independent (2024–2025)
- Other political affiliations: Progressive Conservative (until 2024)
- Education: University of Toronto (BA); University of Ottawa (JD)
- Occupation: Politician, activist

Golsa "Goldie" Ghamari (Note: Persian: گلسا قمری, romanized: Gulsâ Qamarī) (born March 28, 1985) is an Iranian-born Canadian politician and activist who represented the riding of Carleton in the Legislative Assembly of Ontario from 2018 to 2025. Elected as a member of the Progressive Conservative Party of Ontario, she sat as an independent following her removal from the party's caucus in June 2024. She did not seek reelection in 2025.

Before entering provincial politics, Ghamari worked in international trade law. In 2021, the Law Society Tribunal found that her failure to cooperate with a regulatory investigation amounted to professional misconduct and suspended her law license. Premier Doug Ford removed her from the Progressive Conservative caucus after she met with British far-right activist Tommy Robinson. Her subsequent public advocacy has included opposition to the Iranian government, support for Reza Pahlavi, and support for Israel.

== Early life and career ==
Ghamari was born in Iran and immigrated to Canada with her parents in 1986, when she was one year old. She has said that her family left after an assassination attempt against her father and that her parents wanted to raise their daughters in a democratic country.

She earned a bachelor's degree in political science from the University of Toronto and a law degree from the University of Ottawa in 2012. She was called to the Ontario bar in 2013 and worked in international trade law before entering provincial politics.

=== Professional discipline ===
Ghamari received eight administrative suspensions between June 2017 and July 2019 for matters including unpaid annual fees and unfiled annual reports. On March 30, 2021, a Law Society Tribunal panel found that she had failed to respond promptly and completely to investigators' requests for records. The investigation followed a former client's complaint about her handling of a legal dispute with his landlord. Ghamari denied the client's allegations. The tribunal's finding concerned her failure to cooperate, rather than the merits of the underlying complaint.

The tribunal ordered a suspension until she provided a complete response, followed by an additional one-month suspension, and imposed a $2,000 fine and $8,000 in costs.

Ghamari told the tribunal that personal difficulties, including a divorce, had affected her responses. She also argued that the requested phone records included confidential political information and cited a confidentiality agreement with the Progressive Conservative Party. After the suspension, she told CBC News that she had cooperated and would continue to cooperate with the investigation.

== Political career ==
In 2016, Ghamari spoke at the federal Conservative convention in support of ending the party's opposition to same-sex marriage. She won the Progressive Conservative nomination for the new provincial riding of Carleton in November 2016.

In January 2018, Ghamari alleged that MPP Randy Hillier had physically intimidated her at the party's 2016 convention and had tried to discourage her from running for office. Hillier denied the allegation. The party investigated and announced in March 2018 that no further action was warranted.

Ghamari was elected in the 2018 Ontario general election and reelected in 2022. She served as parliamentary assistant to the minister of colleges and universities from July 2021 to June 2022. She also chaired the legislature's standing committees on general government, social policy, and justice policy at different times between 2019 and 2024.

In April 2023, Ghamari introduced Bill 93, Joshua's Law (Lifejackets for Life), continuing an initiative previously advanced by MPP Norm Miller. The bill proposed requiring children aged 12 and younger to wear life jackets or personal flotation devices aboard pleasure boats of nine meters or less that were underway, or while being towed behind those boats using recreational water equipment, with an exception for enclosed cabins. It was named for an 11-year-old boy who had died in a boating accident. The bill passed second reading in April 2023 and was ordered for third reading that September.

During Ottawa's school-bus shortage in 2023, Ghamari argued that the lack of service for rural and suburban students was unacceptable and supported an external review of the Ottawa Student Transportation Authority. NDP education critic Chandra Pasma attributed the shortages in part to provincial funding cuts, while Ghamari questioned why Ottawa accounted for such a large share of the province's canceled routes.

In January 2023, Queen's Park Observer reported that Ghamari was among candidates from several parties who had missed the deadline for filing their 2022 campaign-finance returns. It reported that her riding association would lose a quarterly allowance of $3,335 as a result.

=== Removal from caucus and departure from office ===
On June 28, 2024, Ford removed Ghamari from the Progressive Conservative caucus after she publicized a virtual meeting with Tommy Robinson, a former leader of the far-right English Defence League. The National Council of Canadian Muslims had urged Ford to remove her. Ghamari said that she had not known Robinson's history and that their discussion concerned the Islamic Revolutionary Guard Corps, which Canada had recently designated a terrorist organization. She also stated that she condemned Islamophobia and antisemitism. Ford's office cited repeated lapses in judgment and difficulties working with caucus leadership. A spokesperson said that her explanation for the meeting had contributed to his decision.

Ghamari expressed disappointment with Ford's decision and said that she would continue to support conservative policies and serve her constituents. She subsequently sat as an independent. On January 31, 2025, she announced that she would not run in the provincial election. Her service in the legislature ended on February 27, 2025.

== Political positions and public statements ==
=== Climate change ===
At a May 2018 candidates' debate in Greely, Ghamari said that she accepted that climate change was occurring but did not believe that it was caused by humans. Her position contradicted the scientific consensus that human activity is the principal cause of recent climate change. She also opposed carbon pricing and supported her party's plans to end Ontario's cap-and-trade system.

=== Comments about Islam ===
In November 2023, the Canadian Muslim Public Affairs Council and National Council of Canadian Muslims called for Ghamari's removal from caucus over social media posts that they described as Islamophobic. They cited her suggestion that hearing the Muslim expression "Allahu Akbar" in the streets raised safety concerns and her reposting of messages describing the hijab as a symbol of women's subjugation. CTV News also reported that she had accused NDP MPP Joel Harden of repeating Iranian government propaganda and had called Sarah Jama a "terrorist sympathizer".

Ghamari had also condemned attacks on religious institutions and people of any faith. The Centre for Israel and Jewish Affairs praised her denunciations of antisemitism and Islamophobia. Ford rejected the calls for her removal at that time and described her as an advocate against Islamophobia.

=== Iran ===
Ghamari at an Iranian opposition demonstration in 2024

Ghamari has opposed the government of the Islamic Republic of Iran. In October 2022, she joined demonstrations in Ottawa following the death of Mahsa Amini and said that she wanted to draw attention to the Iranian protesters' demands for democratic government.

After leaving the legislature, she hosted The Goldie Show, a podcast and livestream covering Iran. She supports Reza Pahlavi, the exiled son of Iran's former shah. In a January 2026 interview during protests in Iran, she advocated replacing the Islamic Republic with a secular democratic government and argued that Pahlavi could lead the transition. She also called for American assistance to protesters and credited the 2025 Israeli military campaign with weakening the Iranian government.

In April 2026, Ghamari said that she had deleted social media posts calling for mosques in Iran to be burned or bombed after Ottawa Police warned her about possible criminal charges. She had described the mosques as centers of terrorism. The National Post reported that police confirmed that they had discussed possible charges under section 319 of the Criminal Code with her.

=== Israel ===
Ghamari has publicly supported Israel and encouraged Jewish supporters to attend Iranian opposition rallies with Israeli flags. In October 2024, she visited Israel with an Iranian diaspora delegation invited by the Israeli Foreign Ministry. In a subsequent interview, she linked her support for Israel to her opposition to the Iranian government and described Iranians and Israelis as facing a common adversary.

=== Dispute with a journalist ===
In September 2024, after journalist Samira Mohyeddin criticized one of her posts, Ghamari named Mohyeddin's family restaurant on X and said that she intended to visit while wearing an Israel-themed hoodie. Mohyeddin described the post as threatening, and the Canada Press Freedom Project classified it as a statement that could discourage a journalist's work.

After the restaurant was vandalized on October 8, Mohyeddin expressed concern that the exchange had made the business a target but said that she was not accusing Ghamari of responsibility. Toronto Police said that they had no evidence of a hate motive at that time. Ghamari condemned the violence and called for security footage to be released to help identify those responsible.

== Threats ==
In March 2026, Ghamari reported receiving a death threat in the name of the Iran-linked Handala Hack Team. The message offered a $250,000 reward for killing her and Iranian-American activist Elica Le Bon and claimed that their addresses had been supplied to Mexican cartel associates. Ghamari said that she had reported the threat to police. Later that month, the United States Department of Justice announced that it had seized websites that it linked to Iranian intelligence operations involving threats against dissidents and journalists. The National Post reported that the seized domains included the site where the threat against Ghamari had been posted.

== Personal life ==
Ghamari was married to Wayne Horn, who taught statistics at Carleton University. She told a disciplinary hearing in 2021 that she was going through a divorce. She has a Muslim family background and has identified herself as Zoroastrian.

== Electoral record ==
2022 Ontario general election: Carleton
Party	Candidate	Votes	%	±%	Expenditures
Progressive Conservative	Goldie Ghamari	22,295	48.15	–3.18	$67,504
Liberal	Tom Dawson	12,452	26.89	+7.45	$28,703
New Democratic	Kevin St. Denis	7,256	15.67	–6.83	$14,674
Green	Cody Zulinski	2,537	5.48	+1.53	$5,201
New Blue	Rob Stocki	1,037	2.24	–	$2,991
Ontario Party	Ethan Ferguson	494	1.07	+0.27	$0
None of the Above	Chris Mark Beauchamp	235	0.51	–0.31	$0
Total valid votes/expense limit		46,306	99.66	–	$133,325
Total rejected, unmarked and declined ballots		157	0.34	–0.69	
Turnout		46,463	48.79	–13.21	
Eligible voters		95,232			
Progressive Conservative hold		Swing		▼5.32	
Source: Elections Ontario

2018 Ontario general election: Carleton
Party	Candidate	Votes	%	±%
Progressive Conservative	Goldie Ghamari	25,798	51.33	–1.67
New Democratic	Courtney Potter	11,308	22.50	+10.22
Liberal	Theresa Qadri	9,768	19.44	–8.49
Green	Gordon Kubanek	1,985	3.95	–1.89
None of the Above	Evan Nightingale	413	0.82	–
Ontario Party	Jay Tysick	399	0.79	–
Libertarian	Jean-Serge Brisson	386	0.77	–
Cultural Action	Kevin Harris	110	0.22	–
No Affiliation	Mark Dickson	91	0.18	–
Total valid votes		50,258	98.97	
Total rejected, unmarked and declined ballots		521	1.03	
Turnout		50,779	62.00	
Eligible voters		81,901		
Progressive Conservative hold		Swing		–5.95
Source: Elections Ontario
