= George Charles Hurdman =

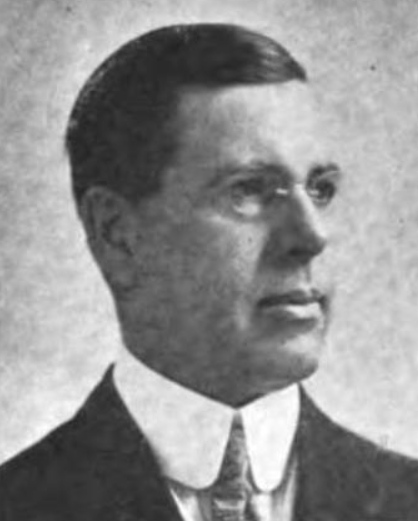

MPP for Ottawa West
- In office June 29, 1914 – September 23, 1919

Personal details
- Born: September 23, 1870 Ottawa, Ontario
- Died: December 22, 1936 (aged 66) Rosseau, Ontario
- Party: Ontario Liberal Party

George Charles Hurdman (September 23, 1870 – December 22, 1936) was a Canadian lumber merchant and political figure. He represented Ottawa West in the Legislative Assembly of Ontario from 1914 to 1919 as a Liberal member.

He was born in Ottawa, Ontario, the son of George Hurdman and Agnes Hurdman. He worked for several lumber firms before establishing his own company in 1899. In that same year, he married Katherine Lynton. Hurdman defeated the incumbent James A. Ellis to win a seat in the provincial assembly in 1914. He served in the local militia and was a lieutenant in the Princess Louise Dragoon Guards during World War I. He died in 1936.
