= Arthur Hurdman =

English footballer

Personal information
- Full name: Arthur Stanley Hurdman
- Date of birth: q3 1882
- Place of birth: Sunderland, England
- Date of death: 20 May 1953 (aged 70)
- Place of death: Sunderland, England
- Position: Outside right

Senior career*
Years	Team	Apps	(Gls)
1900–1906	Sunderland Black Watch		
1906–1908	Sunderland	8	(3)
1908–1909	Darlington		(8)
1909–1910	South Shields Adelaide		
1910–191?	Wingate Albion		
–	Sunderland Rovers		
- * Club domestic league appearances and goals

Arthur Stanley Hurdman (q3 1882 – 1953) was an English footballer who played at outside right in the Football League for Sunderland. He also played non-league football for clubs including Sunderland Black Watch, Darlington, South Shields Adelaide, Wingate Albion and Sunderland Rovers.

== Life and career ==
Hurdman was born in Sunderland in 1882. He played football for Wearside League team Sunderland Black Watch from 1900. While training as a schoolteacher at Borough Road College, London, he was unavailable for club football during term-time.

He signed for Sunderland as an amateur in 1906. A short but sturdy man, described as "one of the most diminutive players in first-class football", and possessed of considerable pace, he made his first-team debut on 1 December 1906 away to Woolwich Arsenal in the First Division. Sunderland won 1–0, and according to the Daily News, Hurdman "brilliantly led many onslaughts on the Arsenal goal, despite his hopelessness when at close quarters with Sharp. He tricked and dodged in and out of position quite tirelessly from beginning to end, and rarely failed to pass with perfection to his best-placed colleague." He turned professional in January 1907, and in the next match, he scored twice as Sunderland came back from 4–1 down at half-time to draw 5–5. In all, Hurdman made eight appearances for Sunderland and scored three goals, all in the league.

In August 1908, he signed for Darlington, for whom he scored eight North-Eastern League goals and made three appearances in the 1908–09 FA Cup. He later played for another three North-Eastern League teams: South Shields Adelaide, Wingate Albion, and Sunderland Rovers.

When Hurdman retired from teaching in 1947, he was assistant headmaster of Chester Road School in Sunderland. He had previously taught at Moor Boys' School. He died in hospital in Sunderland in 1953 at the age of 70.
