= Adam Acres =

Canadian politician

Ontario MPP
- In office 1923–1948
- Preceded by: Robert Grant
- Succeeded by: Donald Morrow
- Constituency: Carleton

Personal details
- Born: May 11, 1878 March Township, Ontario
- Died: April 20, 1955 (aged 76) Britannia, Ottawa
- Party: Progressive Conservative
- Spouse: Almena Waterson
- Occupation: Farmer

Adam Holland Acres (May 11, 1878 – April 20, 1955) was an Ontario politician. He was a Conservative and then Progressive Conservative member of the Legislative Assembly of Ontario from 1923 to 1948. He represented the riding of Carleton.

== Background ==
He was born in March Township, Ontario, Carleton County, Ontario, the son of George H. Acres. In 1900, he married Almena Waterson. His farm was situated on Britannia Bay on the Ottawa River.

== Politics ==
Acres served as reeve for the township from 1913 to 1916.

He was first elected to the Legislative Assembly of Ontario as a Conservative Member of the Legislative Assembly (MLA) representing Carleton in 1923.

Acres was a candidate in the 1936 Conservative leadership convention placing sixth. He continued to sit in the legislature as a Tory backbencher until the 1948 Ontario election, when he retired from politics.
