= Wilfrid Heighington =

Canadian politician

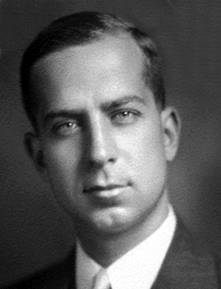
- Capt. Wilfrid Heighington as he appeared in the RMC Review December 1938

Member of Provincial Parliament
- In office 1929–1937
- Preceded by: Joseph Thompson
- Succeeded by: Allan Lamport
- Constituency: St. David

Personal details
- Born: Wilfrid Laurier Heighington; 30 July 1897
- Died: 23 March 1945 (aged 47) Toronto, Ontario
- Party: Conservative
- Spouse: Alice Johnston
- Children: 3
- Parents: Joseph Heighington (father); Clara Compston (mother)
- Occupation: Lawyer
- Awards: Mentioned in dispatches

Military service
- Allegiance: Canada
- Branch/service: Canadian Militia
- Years of service: 1915–45
- Rank: Major
- Unit: 20th Battalion (Central Ontario), CEF
- Commands: O.C. "A" Company Osgoode Hall C.O.T.C. D.A.A.G. Atlantic Command, C.A.S.F.
- Battles/wars: Battle of the Somme, Battle of Vimy Ridge

Wilfrid Laurier Heighington, KC (30 July 1897 – 23 March 1945) was a Canadian soldier, writer, lawyer and politician.

== Background ==
Heighington attended Royal Military College in Kingston, Ontario, leaving in 1915 to join the Canadian Expeditionary Force in World War I. He was twice wounded in and twice mentioned in dispatches. After recuperating from serious wounds he returned to France to fight at the Somme and Vimy Ridge. He ended the war with the rank of captain.

He became a lawyer following the war, was called to the bar in 1920, and was appointed King's Counsel eleven years later.

== Politics ==
Heighington was first elected to the Legislative Assembly of Ontario in the 1929 Ontario general election as the Conservative Member of the Legislative Assembly (MLA) for the St. David electoral district in Toronto, Ontario. He was re-elected in 1934 despite the province wide landslide that brought the Ontario Liberal Party to power under Mitchell Hepburn. He represented the Legislature as part of its official delegation on the pilgrimage to the Canadian National Vimy Memorial's official dedication ceremony in France.

He was a candidate in the 1936 Conservative leadership election, placing fifth. The following year he narrowly lost his seat in the legislature in the 1937 Ontario general election. Despite being out of the legislature, Heighington ran again for the party leadership in 1938, and came in third, but with fewer votes (only 41). George Drew won the leadership on the first ballot.

== Later life ==
Heighington was a prolific writer authoring articles and poems for Saturday Night, The Star Weekly and other periodicals, many of which were reissued in a book, Whereas and Whatnot (1934). In 1943, he published the war novel The Cannon's Mouth.

He was still active with the military when he was hospitalized on 17 March 1945. He died due to complications from pneumonia at St. Michael's hospital on the evening of 23 March.
