= 20th Parliament of Ontario =

The 20th Legislative Assembly of Ontario was in session from October 6, 1937, until June 30, 1943, just prior to the 1943 general election. The majority party was the Ontario Liberal Party led by Mitchell Hepburn.

In 1938, the title "Member of Provincial Parliament", abbreviated as "MPP", was officially adopted by the members of the legislative assembly.

Hepburn resigned as Premier in October 1942, remaining party leader, and Gordon Daniel Conant became Premier. In 1943, Harry Nixon became both party leader and Premier after a leadership convention was held for the provincial Liberal party.

Norman Otto Hipel served as speaker for the assembly until September 2, 1938. James Howard Clark replaced Hipel as speaker.

== Members of the Assembly ==
| Riding | Member | Party | First elected / previously elected | No. of terms |
|---|---|---|---|---|
| Addington | William David Black | Conservative/ Prog. Conservative | 1911 | 8th term |
| Algoma—Manitoulin | Wilfred Lynn Miller | Liberal | 1934 | 2nd term |
| Beaches | Thomas Alexander Murphy | Conservative/ Prog. Conservative | 1926 | 4th term |
| Bellwoods | Arthur Wentworth Roebuck (Note: elected to federal seat in 1940) | Liberal | 1934 | 2nd term |
| Bracondale | Lionel Pretoria Conacher | Liberal | 1937 | 1st term |
| Brant | Harry Corwin Nixon | Liberal | 1919 | 6th term |
| Brantford | Morrison Mann MacBride (Note: died in 1938) | Independent-Liberal | 1919, 1934 | 4th term* |
| Brantford | Louis Hagey (1938) | Liberal | 1938 | 1st term |
| Bruce | John William Sinclair | Liberal | 1934 | 2nd term |
| Carleton | Adam Holland Acres | Conservative/ Prog. Conservative | 1923 | 5th term |
| Cochrane North | Joseph-Anaclet Habel | Liberal | 1934 | 2nd term |
| Cochrane South | Charles Vincent Gallagher | Liberal | 1937 | 1st term |
| Dovercourt | William Duckworth | Conservative/ Prog. Conservative | 1934 | 2nd term |
| Dufferin—Simcoe | Alfred Wallace Downer | Conservative/ Prog. Conservative | 1937 | 1st term |
| Durham | Cecil George Mercer | Liberal | 1937 | 1st term |
| Eglinton | Harold James Kirby | Liberal | 1934 | 2nd term |
| Elgin | Mitchell Frederick Hepburn | Liberal | 1934 | 2nd term |
| Essex North | Adélard Charles Trottier | Liberal | 1934 | 2nd term |
| Essex South | Charles George Fletcher | Liberal | 1926, 1937 | 2nd term* |
| Fort William | Franklin Harford Spence | Conservative/ Prog. Conservative | 1923, 1937 | 4th term* |
| Glengarry | Edmund MacGillivray | Liberal | 1937 | 1st term |
| Grenville—Dundas | George Holmes Challies | Conservative/ Prog. Conservative | 1929 | 3rd term |
| Grey North | Roland Patterson | Liberal-Progressive | 1934 | 2nd term |
| Grey South | Farquhar Robert Oliver | United Farmers | 1926 | 4th term |
| Grey South | Farquhar Robert Oliver | Liberal | 1926 | 4th term |
| Haldimand—Norfolk | Eric William Blake Cross | Liberal | 1937 | 1st term |
| Halton | Thomas Aston Blakelock | Liberal | 1929 | 3rd term |
| Hamilton Centre | William Frederick Schwenger (Note: named judge) | Liberal | 1934 | 2nd term |
| Hamilton Centre | John Newlands (1938) | Liberal | 1938 | 1st term |
| Hamilton East | John P. MacKay | Liberal | 1937 | 1st term |
| Hamilton—Wentworth | Thomas Baker McQuesten | Liberal | 1934 | 2nd term |
| Hastings East | Harold Edward Welsh | Conservative/ Prog. Conservative | 1936 | 2nd term |
| Hastings West | Richard Duke Arnott | Conservative/ Prog. Conservative | 1937 | 1st term |
| High Park | William Alexander Baird | Conservative/ Prog. Conservative | 1926 | 4th term |
| Huron | James Simpson Ballantyne | Liberal | 1934 | 2nd term |
| Huron—Bruce | Charles Alexander Robertson | Liberal | 1926 | 4th term |
| Kenora | Peter Heenan | Liberal | 1919, 1934 | 4th term* |
| Kent East | Douglas Munro Campbell | Liberal-Progressive | 1934 | 3rd term |
| Kent West | Arthur St. Clair Gordon | Liberal | 1934 | 2nd term |
| Kingston | Thomas Ashmore Kidd | Conservative | 1926 | 4th term |
| Lambton East | Milton Duncan McVicar | Liberal | 1934 | 2nd term |
| Lambton East | Charles Oliver Fairbank (1938) | Liberal | 1938 | 1st term |
| Lambton West | William Guthrie | Liberal | 1934 | 2nd term |
| Lanark | George Henry Doucett | Conservative/ Prog. Conservative | 1937 | 1st term |
| Leeds | Walter Bain Reynolds | Conservative/ Prog. Conservative | 1937 | 1st term |
| Lincoln | Archibald Judson Haines | Liberal | 1937 | 1st term |
| London | Archibald Stuart Duncan | Liberal | 1934 | 2nd term |
| Middlesex North | John Willard Freeborn | Liberal | 1919, 1934 | 4th term* |
| Middlesex South | Charles Maitland MacFie | Liberal | 1934 | 2nd term |
| Muskoka—Ontario | James Francis Kelly | Liberal | 1934 | 2nd term |
| Niagara Falls | William Houck | Liberal | 1934 | 2nd term |
| Nipissing | Joseph Elie Cholette | Liberal | 1937 | 1st term |
| Northumberland | Harold Norman Carr | Liberal | 1934 | 2nd term |
| Ontario | Gordon Daniel Conant | Liberal | 1937 | 1st term |
| Ottawa East | Marie Charles Denis Paul Leduc | Liberal | 1934 | 2nd term |
| Ottawa East | Robert Laurier (1940) | Liberal | 1940 | 1st term |
| Ottawa South | George Harrison Dunbar | Conservative/ Prog. Conservative | 1937 | 1st term |
| Oxford | Patrick Michael Dewan | Liberal | 1934 | 2nd term |
| Parkdale | Frederick George McBrien | Conservative | 1923, 1937 | 4th term* |
| Parkdale | William James Stewart (1938) | Conservative/ Prog. Conservative | 1938 | 1st term |
| Parry Sound | Milton Taylor Armstrong | Liberal | 1934 | 2nd term |
| Peel | Thomas Laird Kennedy | Conservative/ Prog. Conservative | 1919, 1937 | 5th term* |
| Perth | William Angus Dickson | Liberal | 1934 | 2nd term |
| Peterborough | Alexander Leslie Elliott | Liberal | 1937 | 1st term |
| Port Arthur | Charles Winnans Cox | Liberal | 1934 | 2nd term |
| Prescott | Aurélien Bélanger | Liberal | 1923, (Note: Russell) 1934 | 4th term* |
| Prince Edward—Lennox | James de Congalton Hepburn | Conservative/ Prog. Conservative | 1937 | 1st term |
| Rainy River | Randolph George Croome | Liberal | 1934 | 2nd term |
| Renfrew North | John Courtland Bradley | Liberal | 1934 | 2nd term |
| Renfrew South | Thomas Patrick Murray | Liberal | 1929 | 3rd term |
| Riverdale | William Summerville | Conservative/ Prog. Conservative | 1937 | 1st term |
| Russell | Romeo Bégin | Liberal | 1937 | 1st term |
| Sault Ste. Marie | Richard McMeekin | Liberal | 1937 | 1st term |
| Sault Ste. Marie | Colin Alexander Campbell (1937) | Liberal | 1937 | 1st term |
| Simcoe Centre | Leonard Jennett Simpson (Note: died in 1940) | Liberal | 1929 | 3rd term |
| Simcoe Centre | Duncan McArthur (1940) | Liberal | 1940 | 1st term |
| Simcoe East | William Finlayson | Conservative | 1923, 1937 | 4th term* |
| Simcoe East | George Alexander Drew (1939) | Conservative/ Prog. Conservative | 1939 | 1st term |
| St. Andrew | John Judah Glass | Liberal | 1934 | 2nd term |
| St. David | Allan Austin Lamport | Liberal | 1937 | 1st term |
| St. George | Ian Thomas Strachan | Liberal | 1934 | 2nd term |
| St. Patrick | Frederick Fraser Hunter | Liberal | 1934 | 2nd term |
| Stormont | Fergus Beck Brownridge | Liberal | 1934 | 2nd term |
| Sudbury | James Maxwell Cooper | Liberal | 1937 | 1st term |
| Timiskaming | William Glennie Nixon | Liberal | 1934 | 2nd term |
| Victoria | Leslie Miscampbell Frost | Conservative/ Prog. Conservative | 1937 | 1st term |
| Waterloo North | Justus Albert Smith | Liberal | 1937 | 1st term |
| Waterloo South | Norman Otto Hipel | Liberal | 1930 | 3rd term |
| Welland | Edward James Anderson | Liberal | 1934 | 2nd term |
| Wellington North | Ross Atkinson McEwing | Liberal | 1937 | 1st term |
| Wellington South | James Harold King | Liberal | 1934 | 2nd term |
| Wentworth | George Henry Bethune | Liberal | 1934 | 2nd term |
| Windsor—Sandwich | James Howard Clark | Liberal | 1934 | 2nd term |
| Windsor—Walkerville | David Arnold Croll | Liberal | 1934 | 2nd term |
| Woodbine | Goldwin Corlett Elgie | Conservative/ Prog. Conservative | 1934 | 2nd term |
| York East | George Stewart Henry | Conservative/ Prog. Conservative | 1913 | 8th term |
| York North | Morgan Baker | Liberal | 1934 | 2nd term |
| York South | Leopold Macaulay | Conservative/ Prog. Conservative | 1926 | 4th term |
| York West | William James Gardhouse | Liberal | 1934 | 2nd term |

== Timeline ==
20th Legislative Assembly of Ontario - Movement in seats held (1937–1943)
| Party | 1937 | Gain/(loss) due to | | | | | 1943 |
| Party | 1937 | Changed party | Death in office | Resignation as MPP | Byelection gain | Byelection hold | 1943 |
|---|---|---|---|---|---|---|---|
| Liberal | 62 | 2 | (4) | (7) | 1 | 5 | 59 |
| Conservative | 23 | | (4) | (2) | | 2 | 19 |
| Liberal–Progressive | 3 | (1) | | | | | 2 |
| United Farmers | 1 | (1) | | | | | – |
| Independent-Liberal | 1 | | (1) | | | | – |
| Vacant | – | | 5 | 5 | | | 10 |
| Total | 90 | – | (4) | (4) | 1 | 7 | 90 |

Changes in seats held (1937–1943)
| Seat | Before | | | | Change | | |
| Seat | Date | Member | Party | Reason | Date | Member | Party |
|---|---|---|---|---|---|---|---|
| Sault Ste. Marie | October 20, 1937 | Richard McMeekin | █ Liberal | Resigned to allow Campbell to enter provincial politics | November 23, 1937 | Colin Alexander Campbell (Note: Won byelection by acclamation) | █ Liberal |
| Hamilton Centre | January 26, 1938 | William Frederick Schwenger | █ Liberal | Appointed to Bench | March 2, 1938 | John Newlands | █ Liberal |
| Lambton East | February 3, 1938 | Milton Duncan McVicar | █ Liberal | Died in office | March 22, 1938 | Charles Oliver Fairbank | █ Liberal |
| Brantford | June 5, 1938 | Morrison Mann MacBride | █ Independent-Liberal | Died in office | July 20, 1938 | Louis Hagey | █ Liberal |
| Parkdale | July 2, 1938 | Fred McBrien | █ Conservative | Died in office | October 5, 1938 | William James Stewart | █ Conservative |
| Simcoe East | January 13, 1939 | William Finlayson | █ Conservative | Resigned to enable Drew to gain seat as new party leader | February 14, 1939 | George Drew | █ Conservative |
| Kingston | March 7, 1940 | Thomas Ashmore Kidd | █ Conservative | Chose to stand in Kingston City in the 1940 federal election | | | █ Vacant |
| Bellwoods | March 8, 1940 | Arthur Wentworth Roebuck | █ Liberal | Chose to stand in Trinity in the 1940 federal election | | | █ Vacant |
| Huron—Bruce | March 22, 1940 | Charles Alexander Robertson | █ Liberal | Died in office | | | █ Vacant |
| Cochrane South | May 28, 1940 | Charles Vincent Gallagher | █ Liberal | Died in office | | | █ Vacant |
| High Park | May 30, 1940 | William Alexander Baird | █ Conservative | Died in office | | | █ Vacant |
| Simcoe Centre | August 18, 1940 | Leonard Jennett Simpson | █ Liberal | Died in office | October 23, 1940 | Duncan McArthur (Note: Cabinet member in Hepburn ministry) (Note: Cabinet member in Conant ministry) (Note: Cabinet member in Nixon ministry) | █ Liberal |
| Ottawa East | September 27, 1940 | Paul Leduc | █ Liberal | Appointed Registrar of Supreme Court of Canada | November 27, 1940 | Robert Laurier | █ Liberal |
| Grey South | January 23, 1941 | Farquhar Oliver | █ United Farmers | Appointed Minister of Public Works | February 24, 1941 | Farquhar Robert Oliver | █ Liberal |
| Lincoln | January 10, 1942 | Archibald Judson Haines | █ Liberal | Resigned, in protest of a liquor licence being issued despite prior guarantees that it would not happen. | | | █ Vacant |
| Fort William | January 16, 1943 | Franklin Harford Spence | █ Conservative | Died in office | | | █ Vacant |
| Ontario | May 18, 1943 | Gordon Daniel Conant | █ Liberal | Appointed Master of the Supreme Court of Ontario. | | | █ Vacant |
| Hastings East | May 20, 1943 | Harold Edward Welsh | █ Conservative | Died in office, having drowned while fishing in Algonquin Provincial Park. | | | █ Vacant |
| St. George | June 1, 1943 | Ian Thomas Strachan | █ Liberal | Appointed Registrar of Deeds for the City of Toronto. | | | █ Vacant |
