= 1929 Ontario general election =

Canadian provincial election

- October 30, 1929

112 seats in the 18th Legislative Assembly of Ontario 57 seats were needed for a majority
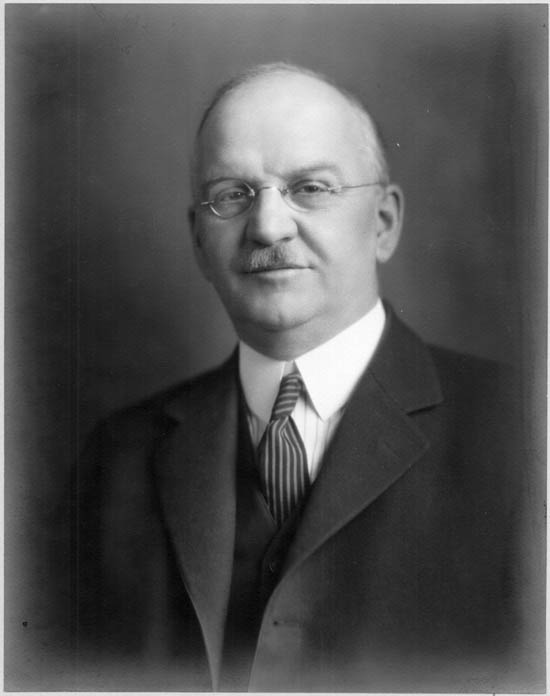
	First party	Second party
		LIB
Leader	George Howard Ferguson	W.E.N. Sinclair
Party	Conservative	Liberal
Leader since	December 2, 1920	1923
Leader's seat	Grenville	Ontario South
Last election	72	15
Seats won	90	13
Seat change	▲18	▼2
Percentage	56.7%	32.2%
Swing	▲1.3pp	▲15.0pp
	Third party	Fourth party
Leader	John Giles Lethbridge	Leslie Oke
Party	Progressive	United Farmers
Leader since	1927	-
Leader's seat	Middlesex West (lost re-election)	Lambton East (lost re-election)
Last election	10	3
Seats won	4	1
Seat change	▼6	▼2
Percentage	3.4%	1.3%
Swing	▼2.9pp	-
Premier before election
G. Howard Ferguson
Conservative
Premier after election
G. Howard Ferguson
Conservative

The 1929 Ontario general election was the 18th general election held in the province of Ontario, Canada. It was held on October 30, 1929, to elect the 112 Members of the 18th Legislative Assembly of Ontario ("MLAs").

== Campaign ==
Every party, including the Ontario Prohibition Union and the English Language School League, issued their own manifesto during the campaign, to the extent that the Press called it the "battle of the manifestos".

The Liberals continued to use their strategy from the previous election of coordinating their efforts with other pro-temperance forces in order to minimize vote splits.

Only the Conservatives fielded candidates in all ridings, and eight of them were returned by acclamation. In 21 two-way contests, the Liberals declined to field a candidate in favour of an ally considered more likely to gain votes. There were only 16 three-cornered races and 2 four-way battles.

Riding contests, by number of candidates (1929)
Candidates	Con	Lib	Prog	L-P	UFO	Lab	I-Con	Comm	Ind	Proh	Total
1	8										8
2	86	65	4	4	2	2	3			6	172
3	16	16	5		1	1	2	4	1	2	48
4	2	2					2	1	1		8
Total	112	83	9	4	3	3	7	5	2	8	236

=== Outcome ===
The Ontario Conservative Party, led by George Howard Ferguson, was elected for a third consecutive term in government with an increased majority in the Legislature.

The Ontario Liberal Party, led by W.E.N. Sinclair, lost one seat, but continued to form the official opposition.

Conservative gains came at the expense of the Progressive Party and the United Farmers of Ontario.

Earl Hutchinson of Kenora is the sole Labour MLA elected.

== Results ==
Elections to the 18th Parliament of Ontario (1929)
Political party	Party leader	MPPs					Votes		
Political party	Party leader	Candidates	1926	Dissol.	1929	±	#	%	± (pp)
Conservative	Howard Ferguson	112	73	72	90	17▲	574,730	56.66%	0.79▲
Liberal	W.E.N. Sinclair	83	13	14	11	2▼	319,487	31.50%	14.33▲
Progressive	William Raney	9	10	8	4	6▼	30,795	3.04%	3.26▼
Liberal–Progressive		4	5	4	3	2▼	17,966	1.77%	2.47▼
United Farmers	Leslie Oke	3	3	3	1	2▼	12,752	1.26%	0.08▼
Labour		3	1	1	1	Steady	8,664	0.85%	0.44▼
Independent Conservative		7	1	2	2	1▲	21,950	2.16%	0.40▲
Independent Liberal		–	4	3	–	4▼	Did not campaign		
Independent Progressive		–	1	1	–	1▼	Did not campaign		
Liberal-Prohibitionist		–	1	1	–	1▼	Did not campaign		
Prohibitionist		8	–	–	–	–	25,807	2.54%	5.52▼
Communist		5	–	–	–	–	1,542	0.15%	New
Independent		2	–	–	–		587	0.06%	New
Liberal-Labour		–	–	–	–		Did not campaign		
Progressive-Liberal		–	–	–	–		Did not campaign		
Liberal-Labour-Prohibitionist		–	–	–	–		Did not campaign		
Vacant				3					
Total		236	112	112	112		1,014,310	100.00%	
Blank and invalid ballots							7,720		
Registered voters / turnout							1,804,932	56.62%	7.33▼

=== Vote and seat summaries ===
Ternary plots - shift of electoral support (1926-1929)
1926

1929
Electoral districts identified by colours of winning parties

Seats and popular vote by party
Party	Seats	Votes	Change (pp)
█ Conservative	90 / 112	56.66%	0.79
█ Liberal	11 / 112	31.50%	14.33
█ Progressive	4 / 112	3.04%	-3.26
█ Liberal–Progressive	3 / 112	1.77%	-2.47
█ United Farmers	1 / 112	1.26%	-0.08
█ Labour	1 / 112	0.85%	-0.44
█ Independent-Conservative	2 / 112	2.16%	0.40
█ Prohibitionist	0 / 112	2.54%	-5.52
█ Other	0 / 112	0.22%	-3.75

=== Synopsis of results ===
Results by riding - 1929 Ontario general election
Riding		Winning party						Turnout (Note: including spoilt ballots)	Votes										
#	Name	1926	Party	Votes	Share	Margin #	Margin %	Turnout	Con	Lib	Prog	Proh	I-Con	L-Prog	UFO	Labour	Comm	Ind	Total
001	Addington	Con	Con	4,273	67.47%	2,213	34.94%	61.09%	4,273	2,060	–	–	–	–	–	–	–	–	6,333
002	Algoma	Con	Con	4,565	67.49%	2,366	34.98%	63.45%	4,565	2,199	–	–	–	–	–	–	–	–	6,764
003	Brant County	Prog	Prog	3,831	53.42%	490	6.83%	71.65%	3,341	–	3,831	–	–	–	–	–	–	–	7,172
004	Brantford	Con	Con	7,740	57.93%	2,119	15.86%	65.98%	7,740	5,621	–	–	–	–	–	–	–	–	13,361
005	Brockville	Con	Con	4,633	60.73%	1,637	21.46%	61.22%	4,633	2,996	–	–	–	–	–	–	–	–	7,629
006	Bruce North	Lib	Lib	4,520	52.09%	362	4.17%	70.52%	4,158	4,520	–	–	–	–	–	–	–	–	8,678
007	Bruce South	Prog	Lib	4,983	53.04%	571	6.08%	69.43%	4,412	4,983	–	–	–	–	–	–	–	–	9,395
008	Carleton	Con	Con	3,781	67.16%	1,932	34.32%	47.76%	3,781	–	–	1,849	–	–	–	–	–	–	5,630
009	Cochrane North	Con	Con	3,121	43.60%	587	8.20%	63.76%	3,121	1,298	–	–	2,534	–	–	–	–	205	7,158
010	Cochrane South	Con	Con	5,686	52.76%	594	5.51%	57.02%	5,686	5,092	–	–	–	–	–	–	–	–	10,778
011	Dufferin	Prog	Prog	3,778	50.30%	45	0.60%	76.42%	3,733	–	3,778	–	–	–	–	–	–	–	7,511
012	Dundas	L-Proh	Con	3,362	44.31%	999	13.17%	73.23%	3,362	1,862	–	2,363	–	–	–	–	–	–	7,587
013	Durham	Lib	Lib	5,860	50.04%	10	0.09%	71.73%	5,850	5,860	–	–	–	–	–	–	–	–	11,710
014	Elgin East	Lib	Con	4,068	51.83%	288	3.67%	76.56%	4,068	3,780	–	–	–	–	–	–	–	–	7,848
015	Elgin West	Con	Con	6,579	56.17%	1,445	12.34%	63.29%	6,579	5,134	–	–	–	–	–	–	–	–	11,713
016	Essex North	Con	Con	8,043	55.97%	1,715	11.93%	63.61%	8,043	6,328	–	–	–	–	–	–	–	–	14,371
017	Essex South	Lib	Con	4,548	53.09%	529	6.17%	65.84%	4,548	4,019	–	–	–	–	–	–	–	–	8,567
018	Fort William	Con	Con	5,467	58.73%	1,626	17.47%	62.52%	5,467	3,841	–	–	–	–	–	–	–	–	9,308
019	Frontenac—Lennox	Lib	Con	4,419	54.77%	769	9.53%	66.19%	4,419	3,650	–	–	–	–	–	–	–	–	8,069
020	Glengarry	Con	Lib	3,290	50.34%	45	0.69%	61.20%	3,245	3,290	–	–	–	–	–	–	–	–	6,535
021	Grenville	Con	Con	4,452	64.81%	2,035	29.63%	65.93%	4,452	–	–	2,417	–	–	–	–	–	–	6,869
022	Grey North	Prog	Prog	6,912	52.15%	571	4.31%	68.85%	6,341	–	6,912	–	–	–	–	–	–	–	13,253
023	Grey South	UFO	UFO	6,607	53.07%	764	6.14%	71.06%	5,843	–	–	–	–	–	6,607	–	–	–	12,450
024	Haldimand	Lib	Con	4,993	50.14%	28	0.28%	74.85%	4,993	4,965	–	–	–	–	–	–	–	–	9,958
025	Halton	Con	L-Prog	5,696	50.32%	72	0.64%	68.70%	5,624	–	–	–	–	5,696	–	–	–	–	11,320
026	Hamilton Centre	Con	Con	7,568	75.54%	5,117	51.07%	46.44%	7,568	2,451	–	–	–	–	–	–	–	–	10,019
027	Hamilton East	Con	Con	8,287	62.64%	3,818	28.86%	53.20%	8,287	4,469	–	–	–	–	–	–	473	–	13,229
028	Hamilton West	Con	Con	6,974	75.93%	4,763	51.86%	51.54%	6,974	2,211	–	–	–	–	–	–	–	–	9,185
029	Hastings East	Con	Con	acclaimed															
030	Hastings North	Con	Con	acclaimed															
031	Hastings West	Con	Con	5,304	66.20%	2,596	32.40%	56.13%	5,304	2,708	–	–	–	–	–	–	–	–	8,012
032	Huron North	Lib	Lib	5,795	57.18%	1,455	14.36%	69.69%	4,340	5,795	–	–	–	–	–	–	–	–	10,135
033	Huron South	Prog	Prog	4,785	50.17%	32	0.34%	66.20%	4,753	–	4,785	–	–	–	–	–	–	–	9,538
034	Kent East	Prog	Con	3,157	38.56%	435	5.31%	69.32%	3,157	2,722	2,309	–	–	–	–	–	–	–	8,188
035	Kent West	Con	Con	6,911	50.81%	221	1.62%	58.71%	6,911	6,690	–	–	–	–	–	–	–	–	13,601
036	Kenora	Con	Lab	3,528	53.04%	404	6.07%	68.32%	3,124	–	–	–	–	–	–	3,528	–	–	6,652
037	Kingston	Con	Con	acclaimed															
038	Lambton East	UFO	Con	4,632	43.93%	775	7.35%	68.67%	4,632	2,056	–	–	–	–	3,857	–	–	–	10,545
039	Lambton West	Con	Con	5,724	54.97%	1,035	9.94%	61.88%	5,724	4,689	–	–	–	–	–	–	–	–	10,413
040	Lanark North	Con	Con	4,038	56.64%	947	13.28%	73.69%	4,038	3,091	–	–	–	–	–	–	–	–	7,129
041	Lanark South	Con	Con	4,308	57.40%	1,111	14.80%	67.06%	4,308	3,197	–	–	–	–	–	–	–	–	7,505
042	Leeds	Con	Con	3,755	49.27%	1,550	20.34%	73.69%	3,755	2,205	–	1,661	–	–	–	–	–	–	7,621
043	Lincoln	Prog	Con	3,557	43.42%	668	8.15%	71.09%	3,557	2,889	1,746	–	–	–	–	–	–	–	8,192
044	London North	Con	Con	6,221	68.04%	3,299	36.08%	47.12%	6,221	–	–	2,922	–	–	–	–	–	–	9,143
045	London South	Con	Con	6,801	58.48%	1,972	16.96%	52.76%	6,801	–	–	–	–	–	–	4,829	–	–	11,630
046	Manitoulin	UFO	Con	2,291	50.03%	3	0.07%	74.57%	2,291	–	–	–	–	–	2,288	–	–	–	4,579
047	Middlesex North	I-Prog	Con	5,288	50.80%	167	1.60%	70.40%	5,288	5,121	–	–	–	–	–	–	–	–	10,409
048	Middlesex West	Prog	Con	3,371	34.81%	186	1.92%	72.71%	3,371	3,129	3,185	–	–	–	–	–	–	–	9,685
049	Muskoka	Con	Con	acclaimed															
050	Niagara Falls	Con	Con	6,713	64.94%	3,088	29.87%	45.50%	6,713	3,625	–	–	–	–	–	–	–	–	10,338
051	Nipissing	Con	Con	4,859	57.99%	1,339	15.98%	62.41%	4,859	3,520	–	–	–	–	–	–	–	–	8,379
052	Norfolk	Con	Con	7,206	55.39%	1,403	10.78%	78.42%	7,206	5,803	–	–	–	–	–	–	–	–	13,009
053	Northumberland	Lib	Con	7,108	52.52%	683	5.05%	70.09%	7,108	6,425	–	–	–	–	–	–	–	–	13,533
054	Ontario North	Prog	Con	3,072	47.33%	876	13.50%	71.69%	3,072	1,222	2,196	–	–	–	–	–	–	–	6,490
055	Ontario South	Lib	Lib	9,791	53.80%	1,383	7.60%	65.35%	8,408	9,791	–	–	–	–	–	–	–	–	18,199
056	Ottawa East	I-Lib	Con	7,813	57.72%	2,089	15.43%	50.47%	7,813	5,724	–	–	–	–	–	–	–	–	13,537
057	Ottawa North	Con	Con	5,198	67.64%	2,711	35.28%	29.30%	5,198	2,487	–	–	–	–	–	–	–	–	7,685
058	Ottawa South	Con	Con	acclaimed															
059	Oxford North	L-Prog	L-Prog	5,449	50.47%	102	0.94%	70.82%	5,347	–	–	–	–	5,449	–	–	–	–	10,796
060	Oxford South	L-Prog	Lib	5,217	52.49%	495	4.98%	72.03%	4,722	5,217	–	–	–	–	–	–	–	–	9,939
061	Parry Sound	Con	Con	4,507	56.48%	1,034	12.96%	61.37%	4,507	3,473	–	–	–	–	–	–	–	–	7,980
062	Peel	Con	Con	6,737	54.27%	1,060	8.54%	69.65%	6,737	5,677	–	–	–	–	–	–	–	–	12,414
063	Perth North	Con	Con	7,273	53.04%	834	6.08%	66.36%	7,273	6,439	–	–	–	–	–	–	–	–	13,712
064	Perth South	Lib	Con	3,428	44.73%	1,246	16.26%	71.07%	3,428	2,182	2,053	–	–	–	–	–	–	–	7,663
065	Peterborough City	Con	Con	5,931	51.97%	450	3.94%	69.89%	5,931	5,481	–	–	–	–	–	–	–	–	11,412
066	Peterborough County	Lib	Con	3,117	50.23%	29	0.47%	70.71%	3,117	3,088	–	–	–	–	–	–	–	–	6,205
067	Port Arthur	Con	Con	acclaimed															
068	Prescott	I-Lib	I-Con	3,996	43.15%	968	10.45%	76.93%	3,028	2,236	–	–	3,996	–	–	–	–	–	9,260
069	Prince Edward	Prog	Con	4,457	53.72%	617	7.44%	80.37%	4,457	–	–	3,840	–	–	–	–	–	–	8,297
070	Rainy River	Con	I-Con	3,142	51.96%	237	3.92%	78.05%	2,905	–	–	–	3,142	–	–	–	–	–	6,047
071	Renfrew North	Con	Con	acclaimed															
072	Renfrew South	Con	Lib	4,990	50.44%	87	0.88%	67.43%	4,903	4,990	–	–	–	–	–	–	–	–	9,893
073	Russell	I-Lib	Con	6,190	51.20%	291	2.41%	65.03%	6,190	5,899	–	–	–	–	–	–	–	–	12,089
074	St. Catharines	I-Con	Con	5,562	53.99%	822	7.98%	49.54%	5,562	–	–	–	4,740	–	–	–	–	–	10,302
075	Sault Ste. Marie	Con	Con	6,216	77.52%	4,413	55.03%	51.55%	6,216	1,803	–	–	–	–	–	–	–	–	8,019
076	Simcoe Centre	Con	Lib	5,199	51.08%	220	2.16%	77.06%	4,979	5,199	–	–	–	–	–	–	–	–	10,178
077	Simcoe East	Con	Con	7,980	61.63%	3,011	23.25%	70.75%	7,980	4,969	–	–	–	–	–	–	–	–	12,949
078	Simcoe Southwest	L-Prog	Con	6,213	54.44%	1,013	8.88%	69.56%	6,213	5,200	–	–	–	–	–	–	–	–	11,413
079	Stormont	Con	Con	6,546	76.82%	4,571	53.64%	52.29%	6,546	–	–	–	1,975	–	–	–	–	–	8,521
080	Sturgeon Falls	I-Lib	Con	3,051	58.92%	924	17.84%	67.64%	3,051	2,127	–	–	–	–	–	–	–	–	5,178
081	Sudbury	Con	Con	acclaimed															
082	Temiskaming	Con	Con	4,888	58.21%	1,379	16.42%	62.70%	4,888	3,509	–	–	–	–	–	–	–	–	8,397
083	Victoria North	L-Prog	L-Prog	3,139	50.25%	31	0.50%	72.72%	3,108	–	–	–	–	3,139	–	–	–	–	6,247
084	Victoria South	L-Prog	Con	4,607	55.38%	895	10.76%	72.91%	4,607	–	–	–	–	3,712	–	–	–	–	8,319
085	Waterloo North	Con	Lib	6,080	36.92%	395	2.40%	56.76%	5,685	6,080	–	–	4,704	–	–	–	–	–	16,469
086	Waterloo South	Lab	Con	7,707	55.77%	1,595	11.54%	62.88%	7,707	6,112	–	–	–	–	–	–	–	–	13,819
087	Welland	Con	Con	6,663	71.54%	4,012	43.07%	52.08%	6,663	2,651	–	–	–	–	–	–	–	–	9,314
088	Wellington Northeast	Lib	Lib	6,288	63.95%	2,744	27.91%	71.75%	3,544	6,288	–	–	–	–	–	–	–	–	9,832
089	Wellington South	Con	Con	7,554	55.39%	1,471	10.79%	67.84%	7,554	–	–	6,083	–	–	–	–	–	–	13,637
090	Wentworth North	Con	Con	4,750	56.31%	1,372	16.27%	31.83%	4,750	3,378	–	–	–	–	–	307	–	–	8,435
091	Wentworth South	Con	Con	8,460	71.59%	5,102	43.17%	51.49%	8,460	3,358	–	–	–	–	–	–	–	–	11,818
092	Windsor East	Con	Con	6,224	65.25%	3,247	34.84%	36.98%	6,224	2,977	–	–	–	–	–	–	337	–	9,538
093	Windsor West	Con	Con	6,419	64.11%	2,825	38.94%	37.71%	6,419	3,594	–	–	–	–	–	–	–	–	10,013
094	Beaches	Con	Con	8,034	75.55%	5,434	51.10%	40.40%	8,034	2,600	–	–	–	–	–	–	–	–	10,634
095	Woodbine	Con	Con	6,839	79.56%	5,082	59.12%	35.55%	6,839	1,757	–	–	–	–	–	–	–	–	8,596
096	Greenwood	Con	Con	5,783	79.04%	4,249	58.07%	35.97%	5,783	1,534	–	–	–	–	–	–	–	–	7,317
097	Riverdale	Con	Con	5,604	72.70%	3,500	45.41%	36.98%	5,604	2,104	–	–	–	–	–	–	–	–	7,708
098	Eglinton	Con	Con	10,009	59.30%	3,140	18.60%	47.39%	10,009	6,869	–	–	–	–	–	–	–	–	16,878
099	St. David	Con	Con	7,199	74.60%	4,748	49.20%	36.97%	7,199	2,451	–	–	–	–	–	–	–	–	9,650
100	St. George	Con	Con	6,450	68.76%	3,520	37.53%	33.04%	6,450	2,930	–	–	–	–	–	–	–	–	9,380
101	St. Patrick	Con	Con	4,473	66.77%	3,231	48.23%	46.22%	4,473	1,242	–	–	859	–	–	–	125	–	6,699
102	St. Andrews	Con	Con	3,436	63.64%	1,473	27.28%	37.71%	3,436	1,963	–	–	–	–	–	–	–	–	5,399
103	Bellwoods	Con	Con	5,114	74.40%	3,749	54.54%	35.11%	5,114	1,365	–	–	–	–	–	–	395	–	6,874
104	Bracondale	Con	Con	7,108	70.54%	4,352	43.19%	42.79%	7,108	2,756	–	–	–	–	–	–	212	–	10,076
105	Dovercourt	Con	Con	4,316	66.94%	2,184	33.87%	43.98%	4,316	2,132	–	–	–	–	–	–	–	–	6,448
106	Brockton	Con	Con	8,731	71.06%	5,176	42.13%	40.42%	8,731	3,555	–	–	–	–	–	–	–	–	12,286
107	Parkdale	Con	Con	6,203	70.48%	3,987	45.30%	45.52%	6,203	2,216	–	–	–	–	–	–	–	382	8,801
108	High Park	Con	Con	8,447	64.39%	3,775	28.78%	48.30%	8,447	–	–	4,672	–	–	–	–	–	–	13,119
109	York East	Con	Con	9,619	64.42%	4,307	28.85%	42.86%	9,619	5,312	–	–	–	–	–	–	–	–	14,931
110	York North	Lib	Con	5,448	50.91%	195	1.82%	75.67%	5,448	5,253	–	–	–	–	–	–	–	–	10,701
111	York South	Con	Con	7,862	68.64%	4,270	37.28%	36.85%	7,862	3,592	–	–	–	–	–	–	–	–	11,454
112	York West	Con	Con	8,296	65.29%	3,885	30.57%	44.67%	8,296	4,411	–	–	–	–	–	–	–	–	12,707

= turnout is above provincial average
= incumbent re-elected under the same party banner
= incumbent switched allegiance for the election
= incumbency arose from byelection gain
= other incumbents renominated

Resulting composition of the 18th Legislative Assembly of Ontario
Source		Party							
Source		Con	Lib	Prog	L-P	UFO	Lab	I-Con	Total
Seats retained	Incumbents returned	47	4	4	2	1			58
Seats retained	Open seats held	11	1						12
Seats retained	Acclamation	8							8
Seats changing hands	Incumbents defeated	18	2		1		1	1	23
Seats changing hands	Open seats gained	3	3					1	7
Seats changing hands	Byelection gain held	1							1
Seats changing hands	Ouster of byelection gain by third party		1						1
Seats changing hands	Change in affiliation	2							2
Total		90	11	4	3	1	1	2	112

=== Seats that changed hands ===
Elections to the 18th Parliament of Ontario – seats won/lost by party, 1926–1929
Party	1926	Gain from (loss to)																				1929
Party	1926	Con		Lib		Pro		L-Pro		UFO		Lab		I-Lib		I-Con		I-Pro		L-Prb		1929
Conservative	73			8	(4)	5		2	(1)	2		1	(1)	3		1	(1)	1		1		90
Liberal	13	4	(8)			1		1														11
Progressive	10		(5)		(1)																	4
Liberal–Progressive	5	1	(2)		(1)																	3
United Farmers	3		(2)																			1
Labour	1	1	(1)																			1
Independent-Liberal	4		(3)														(1)					–
Independent-Conservative	1	1	(1)											1								2
Independent-Progressive	1		(1)																			–
Liberal-Prohibitionist	1		(1)																			–
Total	112	7	(24)	8	(6)	6	–	3	(1)	2	–	1	(1)	4	–	1	(2)	1	–	1	–	112

There were 35 seats that changed allegiance in the election:

Conservative to Liberal

- Glengarry
- Renfrew South
- Simcoe Centre
- Waterloo North

Conservative to Liberal-Progressive

- Halton

Conservative to Labour

- Kenora

Conservative to Independent-Conservative

- Rainy River

Liberal to Conservative

- Elgin East
- Essex South
- Frontenac—Lennox
- Haldimand
- Northumberland
- Perth South
- Peterborough County
- York North

Progressive to Conservative

- Kent East
- Lincoln
- Middlesex West
- Ontario North
- Prince Edward

Progressive to Liberal

- Bruce South

Liberal-Progressive to Conservative

- Simcoe Southwest
- Victoria South

Liberal-Progressive to Liberal

- Oxford South

UFO to Conservative

- Lambton East
- Manitoulin

Labour to Conservative

- Waterloo South

Independent-Liberal to Conservative

- Ottawa East
- Russell
- Sturgeon Falls

Independent-Liberal to Independent-Conservative

- Prescott

Independent-Conservative to Conservative

- St. Catharines

Independent-Progressive to Conservative

- Middlesex North

Liberal-Prohibitionist to Conservative

- Dundas

== See also ==
- Politics of Ontario
- List of Ontario political parties
- Premier of Ontario
- Leader of the Opposition (Ontario)
