= Lambton East (provincial electoral district) =

Ontario electoral district

Defunct provincial electoral district
- Legislature: Legislative Assembly of Ontario
- District created: 1875
- District abolished: 1966
- First contested: 1875
- Last contested: 1963

Lambton East was an electoral riding in Ontario, Canada. It was created in 1875 from the eastern portion of Lambton and was abolished in 1966 before the 1967 election.

== Members of Provincial Parliament ==
Lambton East
| Assembly | Years | Member | Party |
|---|---|---|---|
Created from a split of Lambton riding into Lambton East and Lambton West
| 3rd | 1875–1879 | Peter Graham | Liberal |
| 4th | 1879–1883 | Peter Graham | Liberal |
| 5th | 1883–1886 | Peter Graham | Liberal |
| 6th | 1886–1890 | Peter Graham | Liberal |
| 7th | 1890–1893 | Hugh McKenzie | Liberal |
| 7th | 1893–1894 | Peter Duncan McCallum | Protestant Protective Association |
| 8th | 1894–1898 | Peter Duncan McCallum | Protestant Protective Association |
| 9th | 1898–1902 | Henry John Pettypiece | Liberal |
| 10th | 1902–1904 | Henry John Pettypiece | Liberal |
| 11th | 1905–1908 | Hugh Montgomery | Conservative |
| 12th | 1908–1911 | Robert John McCormick | Liberal |
| 13th | 1911–1914 | Robert John McCormick | Liberal |
| 14th | 1914–1919 | John Burton Martyn | Conservative |
| 15th | 1919–1923 | Leslie Warner Oke | United Farmers |
| 16th | 1923–1926 | Leslie Warner Oke | United Farmers |
| 17th | 1926–1929 | Leslie Warner Oke | United Farmers |
| 18th | 1929–1934 | Thomas Howard Fraleigh | Conservative |
| 19th | 1934–1937 | Milton Duncan McVicar | Liberal |
| 20th | 1937–1938 | Milton Duncan McVicar | Liberal |
| 20th | 1938–1943 | Charles Oliver Fairbank | Liberal |
| 21st | 1943–1945 | Robert Roy Downie | Liberal |
| 22nd | 1945–1948 | Charles Janes | Progressive Conservative |
| 23rd | 1948–1951 | Charles Janes | Progressive Conservative |
| 24th | 1951–1955 | Charles Janes | Progressive Conservative |
| 25th | 1955–1959 | Charles Janes | Progressive Conservative |
| 26th | 1959–1963 | Charles Janes | Progressive Conservative |
| 27th | 1963–1967 | Lorne Henderson | Progressive Conservative |
Sourced from the Ontario Legislative Assembly
Redistributed into Lambton and Sarnia before the 1967 election

== Election results ==
1963 Ontario general election
| Party | Candidate | Votes | % | ±% |
|---|---|---|---|---|
| Progressive Conservative | Lorne Henderson | 7,131 | 52.24 | –1.45 |
| Liberal | Russell V. Watson | 6,267 | 45.91 | –0.40 |
| New Democratic | Donald Whiting | 252 | 1.85 | – |
| Total valid votes | | 13,650 | 98.97 | |
| Total rejected ballots | | 142 | 1.03 | –0.09 |
| Turnout | | 13,792 | 75.93 | +5.02 |
| Eligible voters | | 18,163 | | |
| Progressive Conservative hold | | Swing | | –0.52 |
Source: Elections Ontario

1959 Ontario general election
| Party | Candidate | Votes | % | ±% |
|---|---|---|---|---|
| Progressive Conservative | Charles Janes | 6,673 | 53.69 | –2.72 |
| Liberal | Russell V. Watson | 5,756 | 46.31 | +2.72 |
| Total valid votes | | 12,429 | 98.88 | |
| Total rejected ballots | | 141 | 1.12 | +0.04 |
| Turnout | | 12,570 | 70.91 | –0.62 |
| Eligible voters | | 17,726 | | |
| Progressive Conservative hold | | Swing | | –2.72 |
Source: Elections Ontario

1955 Ontario general election
| Party | Candidate | Votes | % | ±% |
|---|---|---|---|---|
| Progressive Conservative | Charles Janes | 6,855 | 56.41 | –1.94 |
| Liberal | Harold McKim | 5,298 | 43.59 | +1.94 |
| Total valid votes | | 12,153 | 98.92 | |
| Total rejected ballots | | 133 | 1.08 | +0.08 |
| Turnout | | 12,286 | 71.53 | +4.09 |
| Eligible voters | | 17,176 | | |
| Progressive Conservative hold | | Swing | | –1.94 |
Source: Elections Ontario

1951 Ontario general election
| Party | Candidate | Votes | % | ±% |
|---|---|---|---|---|
| Progressive Conservative | Charles Janes | 6,610 | 58.35 | +10.50 |
| Liberal | Ivor Wever | 4,719 | 41.65 | –1.85 |
| Total valid votes | | 11,329 | 99.00 | |
| Total rejected ballots | | 115 | 1.00 | +0.31 |
| Turnout | | 11,444 | 67.44 | +1.37 |
| Eligible voters | | 16,968 | | |
| Progressive Conservative hold | | Swing | | +6.18 |
Source: Elections Ontario

1948 Ontario general election
| Party | Candidate | Votes | % | ±% |
|---|---|---|---|---|
| Progressive Conservative | Charles Janes | 5,632 | 47.85 | +1.89 |
| Liberal | Walter S. Weese | 5,121 | 43.51 | – |
| Co-operative Commonwealth | Aubrey Butler | 1,018 | 8.65 | –0.13 |
| Total valid votes | | 11,771 | 99.31 | |
| Total rejected ballots | | 82 | 0.69 | +0.00 |
| Turnout | | 11,853 | 66.08 | –4.93 |
| Eligible voters | | 17,938 | | |
| Progressive Conservative hold | | Swing | | +0.94 |
Source: Elections Ontario

1945 Ontario general election
| Party | Candidate | Votes | % | ±% |
|---|---|---|---|---|
| Progressive Conservative | Charles Janes | 5,693 | 45.96 | +6.76 |
| Liberal–Progressive | Robert Roy Downie | 5,607 | 45.27 | –2.08 |
| Co-operative Commonwealth | Henry R. Clark | 1,087 | 8.78 | –4.68 |
| Total valid votes | | 12,387 | 99.31 | |
| Total rejected ballots | | 86 | 0.69 | +0.19 |
| Turnout | | 12,473 | 71.01 | +16.12 |
| Eligible voters | | 17,565 | | |
| Progressive Conservative gain from Liberal | | Swing | | +4.42 |
Source: Elections Ontario

1943 Ontario general election
| Party | Candidate | Votes | % | ±% |
|---|---|---|---|---|
| Liberal | Robert Roy Downie | 4,520 | 47.34 | –12.52 |
| Progressive Conservative | Charles Janes | 3,742 | 39.20 | –0.94 |
| Co-operative Commonwealth | William James Stewart | 1,285 | 13.46 | – |
| Total valid votes | | 9,547 | 99.50 | |
| Total rejected ballots | | 48 | 0.50 | +0.50 |
| Turnout | | 9,595 | 54.89 | – |
| Eligible voters | | 17,479 | | |
| Liberal hold | | Swing | | –5.79 |
Source: Elections Ontario

Ontario provincial by-election, March 22, 1938 Death of Milton Duncan McVicar
| Party | Candidate | Votes | % | ±% |
|---|---|---|---|---|
| Liberal | Charles Oliver Fairbank | 7,880 | 59.86 | –3.71 |
| Conservative | James Currie | 5,284 | 40.14 | +3.71 |
| Total valid votes | | 13,164 | 100.00 | |
| Total rejected ballots | | – | | |
| Turnout | | 13,164 | – | – |
| Eligible voters | | | | |
| Liberal hold | | Swing | | –3.71 |
Source: Elections Ontario

1937 Ontario general election
| Party | Candidate | Votes | % | ±% |
|---|---|---|---|---|
| Liberal | Milton Duncan McVicar | 8,598 | 63.57 | +6.77 |
| Conservative | Duncan James Matheson | 4,928 | 36.43 | –2.92 |
| Total valid votes | | 13,526 | 99.36 | |
| Total rejected ballots | | 87 | 0.64 | –0.25 |
| Turnout | | 13,613 | 74.79 | +0.16 |
| Eligible voters | | 18,201 | | |
| Liberal hold | | Swing | | +4.85 |
Source: Elections Ontario

1934 Ontario general election
| Party | Candidate | Votes | % | ±% |
|---|---|---|---|---|
| Liberal | Milton Duncan McVicar | 7,835 | 56.80 | +37.30 |
| Conservative | Thomas Howard Fraleigh | 5,429 | 39.36 | –4.57 |
| United Farmers | Leslie Warner Oke | 347 | 2.52 | –34.06 |
| Independent | W. Y. Fitzgerald | 183 | 1.33 | – |
| Total valid votes | | 13,794 | 99.11 | |
| Total rejected ballots | | 124 | 0.89 | +0.43 |
| Turnout | | 13,918 | 74.64 | +5.96 |
| Eligible voters | | 18,648 | | |
| Liberal gain from Conservative | | Swing | | +35.68 |
Source: Elections Ontario

1929 Ontario general election
| Party | Candidate | Votes | % | ±% |
|---|---|---|---|---|
| Conservative | Thomas Howard Fraleigh | 4,632 | 43.93 | +1.81 |
| United Farmers | Leslie Warner Oke | 3,857 | 36.58 | –21.30 |
| Liberal | Fred Cormack Eastman | 2,056 | 19.50 | – |
| Total valid votes | | 10,545 | 99.54 | |
| Total rejected ballots | | 49 | 0.46 | +0.18 |
| Turnout | | 10,594 | 68.67 | +0.10 |
| Eligible voters | | 15,427 | | |
| Conservative gain from United Farmers | | Swing | | +11.55 |
Source: Elections Ontario

1926 Ontario general election
| Party | Candidate | Votes | % | ±% |
|---|---|---|---|---|
| United Farmers | Leslie Warner Oke | 6,075 | 57.88 | +13.60 |
| Conservative | John Thomas Sproule | 4,421 | 42.12 | +4.13 |
| Total valid votes | | 10,496 | 99.72 | |
| Total rejected ballots | | 30 | 0.29 | –0.06 |
| Turnout | | 10,526 | 68.57 | +1.89 |
| Eligible voters | | 15,351 | | |
| United Farmers hold | | Swing | | +4.73 |
Source: Elections Ontario

1923 Ontario general election
| Party | Candidate | Votes | % | ±% |
|---|---|---|---|---|
| United Farmers | Leslie Warner Oke | 3,224 | 44.28 | –8.81 |
| Conservative | William R. Dawson | 2,766 | 37.99 | +12.91 |
| Liberal | William G. Connelly | 1,291 | 17.73 | –4.11 |
| Total valid votes | | 7,281 | 99.66 | |
| Total rejected ballots | | 25 | 0.34 | –2.78 |
| Turnout | | 7,306 | 66.68 | –13.26 |
| Eligible voters | | 10,957 | | |
| United Farmers hold | | Swing | | –10.86 |
Source: Elections Ontario

1919 Ontario general election
| Party | Candidate | Votes | % | ±% |
|---|---|---|---|---|
| United Farmers | Leslie Warner Oke | 4,575 | 53.09 | – |
| Conservative | John Burton Martyn | 2,161 | 25.08 | –24.97 |
| Liberal | Duncan J. McEachern | 1,882 | 21.84 | –28.12 |
| Total valid votes | | 8,618 | 96.88 | |
| Total rejected ballots | | 278 | 3.13 | +2.87 |
| Turnout | | 8,896 | 79.94 | –12.83 |
| Eligible voters | | 11,128 | | |
| United Farmers gain from Conservative | | Swing | | +14.06 |
Source: Elections Ontario

1914 Ontario general election
| Party | Candidate | Votes | % | ±% |
|---|---|---|---|---|
| Conservative | John Burton Martyn | 2,154 | 50.05 | +1.09 |
| Liberal | Robert John McCormick | 2,150 | 49.95 | –1.09 |
| Total valid votes | | 4,304 | 99.75 | |
| Total rejected ballots | | 11 | 0.25 | –0.07 |
| Turnout | | 4,315 | 92.78 | +14.68 |
| Eligible voters | | 4,651 | | |
| Conservative gain from Liberal | | Swing | | +1.09 |
Source: Elections Ontario

1911 Ontario general election
| Party | Candidate | Votes | % | ±% |
|---|---|---|---|---|
| Liberal | Robert John McCormick | 2,170 | 51.05 | –1.52 |
| Conservative | John Burton Martyn | 2,081 | 48.95 | +1.52 |
| Total valid votes | | 4,251 | 99.67 | |
| Total rejected ballots | | 14 | 0.33 | +0.13 |
| Turnout | | 4,265 | 78.10 | –29.11 |
| Eligible voters | | 5,461 | | |
| Liberal hold | | Swing | | –1.52 |
Source: Elections Ontario

1908 Ontario general election
| Party | Candidate | Votes | % | ±% |
|---|---|---|---|---|
| Liberal | Robert John McCormick | 2,404 | 52.57 | +4.51 |
| Conservative | Hugh Montgomery | 2,169 | 47.43 | –4.51 |
| Total valid votes | | 4,573 | 99.80 | |
| Total rejected ballots | | 9 | 0.20 | +0.20 |
| Turnout | | 4,582 | 107.21 | +22.03 |
| Eligible voters | | 4,274 | | |
| Liberal gain from Conservative | | Swing | | +4.51 |
Source: Elections Ontario

1905 Ontario general election
| Party | Candidate | Votes | % | ±% |
|---|---|---|---|---|
| Conservative | Hugh Montgomery | 2,587 | 51.94 | +2.99 |
| Liberal | Henry John Pettypiece | 2,394 | 48.06 | –2.99 |
| Total valid votes | | 4,981 | 100.00 | |
| Total rejected ballots | | – | | |
| Turnout | | 4,981 | 85.17 | +3.84 |
| Eligible voters | | 5,848 | | |
| Conservative gain from Liberal | | Swing | | +2.99 |
Source: Elections Ontario

1902 Ontario general election
| Party | Candidate | Votes | % | ±% |
|---|---|---|---|---|
| Liberal | Henry John Pettypiece | 2,530 | 51.05 | +1.84 |
| Conservative | Peter Duncan McCallum | 2,426 | 48.95 | +46.53 |
| Total valid votes | | 4,956 | 99.42 | |
| Total rejected ballots | | 29 | 0.58 | +0.33 |
| Turnout | | 4,985 | 81.33 | +2.93 |
| Eligible voters | | 6,129 | | |
| Liberal hold | | Swing | | +24.19 |
Source: Elections Ontario

1898 Ontario general election
| Party | Candidate | Votes | % | ±% |
|---|---|---|---|---|
| Liberal | Henry John Pettypiece | 2,361 | 49.21 | +1.27 |
| Independent | Peter Duncan McCallum | 2,321 | 48.37 | –3.68 |
| Conservative | J. A. McLeary | 116 | 2.42 | – |
| Total valid votes | | 4,798 | 99.75 | |
| Total rejected ballots | | 12 | 0.25 | –0.13 |
| Turnout | | 4,810 | 78.40 | +0.25 |
| Eligible voters | | 6,135 | | |
| Liberal gain from Independent Conservative-Protestant Protective | | Swing | | +2.48 |
Source: Elections Ontario

1894 Ontario general election
| Party | Candidate | Votes | % | ±% |
|---|---|---|---|---|
| Independent Conservative-Protestant Protective | Peter Duncan McCallum | 2,326 | 52.06 | –2.93 |
| Liberal | Robert John McCormick | 2,142 | 47.94 | – |
| Total valid votes | | 4,468 | 99.62 | |
| Total rejected ballots | | 17 | 0.38 | +0.13 |
| Turnout | | 4,485 | 78.15 | +7.93 |
| Eligible voters | | 5,739 | | |
| Independent Conservative-Protestant Protective hold | | Swing | | –1.47 |
Source: Elections Ontario

Ontario provincial by-election, December 2, 1893 Death of Hugh McKenzie
| Party | Candidate | Votes | % | ±% |
|---|---|---|---|---|
| Independent Conservative | Peter Duncan McCallum | 2,230 | 54.99 | – |
| Pauper | McKinnon | 1,825 | 45.01 | – |
| Total valid votes | | 4,055 | 99.75 | |
| Total rejected ballots | | 10 | 0.25 | –0.09 |
| Turnout | | 4,065 | 70.22 | –3.43 |
| Eligible voters | | 5,789 | | |
| Independent Conservative gain from Liberal | | Swing | | – |
Source: Elections Ontario

1890 Ontario general election
| Party | Candidate | Votes | % | ±% |
|---|---|---|---|---|
| Liberal | Hugh McKenzie | 2,203 | 52.40 | –0.38 |
| Conservative | E. McGillicuddy | 1,741 | 41.41 | –5.81 |
| Equal Rights | S. D. Barnes | 260 | 6.18 | – |
| Total valid votes | | 4,204 | 99.67 | |
| Total rejected ballots | | 14 | 0.33 | –0.18 |
| Turnout | | 4,218 | 73.65 | +3.22 |
| Eligible voters | | 5,727 | | |
| Liberal hold | | Swing | | +3.09 |
Source: Elections Ontario

1886 Ontario general election
| Party | Candidate | Votes | % | ±% |
|---|---|---|---|---|
| Liberal | Peter Graham | 2,270 | 52.78 | +1.34 |
| Conservative | N. M. Stanley | 2,031 | 47.22 | –1.34 |
| Total valid votes | | 4,301 | 99.49 | |
| Total rejected ballots | | 22 | 0.51 | +0.10 |
| Turnout | | 4,323 | 70.43 | –1.37 |
| Eligible voters | | 6,138 | | |
| Liberal hold | | Swing | | +1.34 |
Source: Elections Ontario

1883 Ontario general election
| Party | Candidate | Votes | % | ±% |
|---|---|---|---|---|
| Liberal | Peter Graham | 2,017 | 51.44 | +0.56 |
| Conservative | Mr. Lucas | 1,904 | 48.56 | –0.56 |
| Total valid votes | | 3,921 | 99.59 | |
| Total rejected ballots | | 16 | 0.41 | +0.41 |
| Turnout | | 3,937 | 71.80 | –1.42 |
| Eligible voters | | 5,483 | | |
| Liberal hold | | Swing | | +0.56 |
Source: Elections Ontario

1879 Ontario general election
| Party | Candidate | Votes | % | ±% |
|---|---|---|---|---|
| Liberal | Peter Graham | 1,840 | 50.88 | −2.46 |
| Conservative | G. Sherley | 1,776 | 49.12 | +2.46 |
| Total valid votes | | 3,616 | 73.23 | +2.49 |
| Eligible voters | | 4,938 | | |
| Liberal hold | | Swing | | −2.46 |
Source: Elections Ontario

1875 Ontario general election
| Party | Candidate | Votes | % |
|---|---|---|---|
| Liberal | Peter Graham | 1,443 | 53.35 |
| Conservative | G. Shirley | 1,262 | 46.65 |
| Turnout | | 2,705 | 70.74 |
| Eligible voters | | 3,824 | |
| Liberal pickup new district. | | | |
Source: Elections Ontario
