= Leslie Warner Oke =

Canadian politician

Leslie Oke

Ontario MPP
- In office 1919–1929
- Preceded by: John Burton Martyn
- Succeeded by: Thomas Howard Fraleigh
- Constituency: Lambton East

Personal details
- Born: June 18, 1877 Alvinston, Ontario
- Died: 1955 (aged 77–78)
- Party: United Farmers of Ontario
- Spouse: Mary McPhedrain (m. 1911)
- Occupation: Farmer

Leslie Warner Oke (June 18, 1877 – 1955) was an Ontario farmer and political figure. He represented Lambton East in the Legislative Assembly of Ontario from 1919 to 1929 as a United Farmers member.

Oke defeated John Burton Martyn to win a seat in the provincial assembly in 1919. He supported the UFO-Labour government of E.C. Drury from 1919 to 1923 and remained with what was becoming the Progressive Party under the leadership of Manning Doherty but he refused to accept William Raney when he was elected as leader of the Progressive bloc in 1925 as Raney was not a farmer. Oke and Beniah Bowman refused to sit with the Progressive caucus and sat as UFO MLAs instead. After the departure of Bowman and the election of two new UFO MLAs, Farquhar Oliver and Thomas Farquhar, in the 1926 provincial election, Oke led a rump of three UFO MLAs until he lost his seat in the 1929 election to Thomas Howard Fraleigh. He attempted to return to the legislature as a UFO candidate, nominated by the local United Farmers of Ontario association and endorsed by the Co-operative Commonwealth Federation (Ontario) in the 1934 provincial election but was defeated by Milton Duncan McVicar who was nominated at a joint Liberal and Progressive nominating meeting but sat as a Liberal MPP upon his election.

Oke was born in Alvinston, Ontario, the son of James Oke, and educated there. In 1911, he married Mary McPhedran. He served as a member of the municipal council for Brooke Township before entering provincial politics.
