= John Burton Martyn =

Canadian politician

John Martyn

Ontario MPP
- In office 1914–1919
- Preceded by: Robert John McCormick
- Succeeded by: Leslie Warner Oke
- Constituency: Lambton East

Personal details
- Born: July 22, 1867 Strathroy, Ontario
- Died: 1921 (aged 53–54) Alvinston, Ontario
- Party: Conservative
- Occupation: Physician

John Burton Martyn (July 22, 1867 – 1921) was an Ontario physician and political figure. He represented Lambton East in the Legislative Assembly of Ontario from 1914 to 1919 as a Conservative member.

He was born in Strathroy, Ontario and moved to Alvinston with his family in 1874. He studied medicine at Trinity College, receiving his M.D. He set up practice in Walkerton, returning to Alvinston in 1893. He retired from practice in 1916. Martyn was a prominent member of the Masonic Order.

He was defeated by Robert John McCormick for the provincial seat in 1911 but defeated McCormick in 1914. He was unsuccessful in his bid for reelection in 1919, losing to Leslie Warner Oke of the United Farmers of Ontario. He died of pneumonia in 1921.
