= Albert Edwin Honeywell =

Canadian politician

MPP for Ottawa North
- In office December 01, 1926 – April 03, 1934

Personal details
- Born: November 15, 1878 Britannia, Ottawa, Ontario
- Died: February 2, 1956 (aged 77) Toronto, Ontario
- Party: Progressive Conservative Party of Ontario

Albert Edwin Honeywell (November 15, 1878 – February 2, 1956) was an Ontario barrister and political figure. He represented Ottawa North in the Legislative Assembly of Ontario from 1926 to 1934 as a Conservative member.

He was born in Ottawa, the son of Ira Honeywell and Sarah Nelson, the former one of the first settlers in Nepean Township.

Albert was educated in Kemptville, at Toronto University and at Osgoode Hall. In 1907, he married Annie A. Young. He later served as judge for York County.

He died at his Toronto home in 1956 after suffering a coronary thrombosis.

== Family ==
According to the first settler plaque installed by the National Capital Commission, Ira Honeywell bought Lot 26, Concession I, Ottawa Front, Nepean Township in 1809. In 1810, Ira Honeywell came overland from Prescott County, Upper Canada (later Ontario) and built a log cabin near the site of the current plaque near the Ottawa River and present day Woodward Avenue. In 1811, Ira Honeywell brought his wife Mary (Polly) Andrews and three children to the site, where they became the first settlers in Nepean Township. Mary Honeywell Elementary School is named in her honour as the first teacher in Nepean. Some of the descendants of Ira and Mary continue to live in the Ottawa area. Ira Honeywell was the son of Rice Honeywell, an entrepreneurial farmer and businessman from the Mohawk Valley of New York who immigrated to the Augusta area of Grenville County, Upper Canada with his wife Ruth Allen, daughter of Loyalist Weston Allen, who also migrated to the Augusta Township region in 1784 at the end of the American Revolution.
