= Ottawa North =

Provincial electoral district in Ontario, Canada

Ontario electoral district

Defunct provincial electoral district
- Legislature: Legislative Assembly of Ontario
- District created: 1926
- District abolished: 1934
- First contested: 1926
- Last contested: 1934

Ottawa North was a provincial electoral district in Ontario, Canada. It existed from 1926 to 1934, when it was abolished into Ottawa East, Ottawa South and Carleton. It consisted of Wellington Ward, Central Ward, Victoria Ward, and parts of Dalhousie Ward and Capital Ward.

The ridings only Member of Provincial Parliament was Albert Edwin Honeywell.

== Members of Provincial Parliament ==
Ottawa North
Assembly	Years	Member	Party
Riding created from Ottawa West
17th	1926–1929	Albert Edwin Honeywell	Conservative
18th	1929–1934	Albert Edwin Honeywell	Conservative
Riding dissolved into Ottawa East, Ottawa South and Carleton

== Election results ==
1929 Ontario general election
Party	Candidate	Votes	%	±%
Conservative	Albert Edwin Honeywell	5,198	67.64	+0.04
Liberal	Walter J. Gilhooly	2,487	32.36	–0.04
Total valid votes		7,685	99.12	
Total rejected ballots		68	0.88	–0.32
Turnout		7,753	29.30	–14.61
Eligible voters		26,460		
Conservative hold		Swing		+0.04
Source: Elections Ontario

1926 Ontario general election
Party	Candidate	Votes	%
Conservative	Albert Edwin Honeywell	9,042	67.59
Liberal	Gordon Smith Henderson	4,335	32.41
Total valid votes		13,377	98.80
Total rejected ballots		162	1.20
Turnout		13,539	43.91
Eligible voters		30,831	
Conservative pickup new district.			
Source: Elections Ontario

== See also ==
- List of Ontario provincial electoral districts
- Canadian provincial electoral districts
