= Hugh McKenzie (Ontario politician) =

Canadian politician

Ontario MPP
- In office 1890–1893
- Preceded by: Peter Graham
- Succeeded by: Peter Duncan McCallum
- Constituency: Lambton East

Personal details
- Born: January 12, 1840 Inverness-shire, Scotland
- Died: October 3, 1893 (aged 53) Toronto, Ontario
- Party: Liberal
- Spouse: Elizabeth Fraser (m. 1864)
- Occupation: Farmer

Hugh McKenzie (January 12, 1840 – October 3, 1893) was an Ontario farmer and political figure. He represented Lambton East in the Legislative Assembly of Ontario from 1890 to 1893 as a Liberal member.

He was born in Inverness-shire, Scotland in 1840 and came to East Williams Township, Middlesex County with his parents in 1848. The family later moved to Warwick. In 1864, he married Elizabeth Fraser. McKenzie died of typhoid fever in 1893, aged 53, while still in office and was buried in Watford.
