= Henry John Pettypiece =

Canadian politician

Ontario MPP
- In office 1898–1904
- Preceded by: Peter Duncan McCallum
- Succeeded by: Hugh Montgomery
- Constituency: Lambton East

Personal details
- Born: November 11, 1855 Anderdon Township, Lambton County, Canada West
- Died: 1942 (aged 86–87) Forest, Ontario
- Party: Liberal
- Occupation: Businessman

Henry John Pettypiece (November 11, 1855 – 1942) was an Ontario journalist, businessman and political figure. He represented Lambton East in the Legislative Assembly of Ontario as a Liberal member from 1898 to 1904.

He was born in Anderdon Township, Lambton County, the son of Anthony Pettypiece, and apprenticed as a printer with the Amherstburg Echo. In 1879, he married Mary Meloche. He purchased the Forest Free Press in 1883 with William H. Auld; in 1888, he became sole owner. Pettypiece served as ticket agent at Forest for the Canadian Pacific Railway. He also served on the town council for Forest and was mayor in 1913 and 1914. Pettypiece served on the executive of the Canadian Free Press Association and was selected as president in 1903. In 1905, he was defeated by Hugh Montgomery for the seat in the provincial assembly. He died in Forest in 1942.
