= Thomas Howard Fraleigh =

Canadian politician

T. Howard Fraleigh

Ontario MPP
- In office 1929–1934
- Preceded by: Leslie Warner Oke
- Succeeded by: Milton Duncan McVicar
- Constituency: Lambton East

Personal details
- Born: June 28, 1877 St. Marys, Ontario
- Died: January 29, 1946 (aged 68) Forest, Ontario
- Party: Conservative
- Spouse: Winnifred Anderson (m. 1902)
- Occupation: Farmer

Thomas Howard Fraleigh (June 28, 1877 – January 29, 1946) was an Ontario farmer and political figure. He represented Lambton East in the Legislative Assembly of Ontario from 1929 to 1934 as a Conservative member.

He was born in St. Marys, Ontario, the son of Sidney Fraleigh, and was educated there. In 1902, he married Winnifred Anderson. He belonged to the local Masonic lodge. Fraleigh grew flax and hemp near Forest, Ontario. Fraleigh also pioneered techniques to make more efficient use of pasture land when raising of livestock. Fraleigh coordinated Canadian flax production in World War I: flax was shipped to Ireland to produce linen for use in the manufacture of airplane wings. Fraleigh also experimented with the production of hemp for use in manufacturing fibres. The cultivation of hemp was later banned in Canada because of its association with cannabis. He died at his home in Forest, Ontario, on January 29, 1946.
