= Brockton (electoral district) =

Former provincial electoral district in Ontario, Canada

Ontario electoral district

Defunct provincial electoral district
- Legislature: Legislative Assembly of Ontario
- District created: 1925
- District abolished: 1934
- First contested: 1926
- Last contested: 1929

Demographics
- Electors: 38,000

Brockton was an Ontario provincial electoral district in the old City of Toronto's west-end. It was represented in the Legislative Assembly of Ontario from 1926 until 1934, when it was abolished and redistributed into the Parkdale and Dovercourt districts. Its only Member of the Legislative Assembly (MLA) was Fred McBrien. When his district was abolished, he decided not to seek re-election in another district.

== Boundaries ==
The northern boundary was the city's northern boundary with York Township, starting at Lavender Road, through the northern side of Rowntree Avenue, continuing just north of Innes Avenue, through Prospect Cemetery and ending at Morrison Avenue. It then went southwards along its eastern border on the western edge of Dufferin Street to Lake Ontario. The western border picked up on land on Dowling Avenue and then jogged west on the north side of Queen Street West to the east side of Sorauren Avenue. It continued north on Sorauren to the south side of Dundas Street West, where it then ran east until the Canadian National Railway (CNR) tracks. It then went north along the tracks and connected with the northern boundary at the city limits, just south of Lavender Road.

== Members of Provincial Parliament ==
Brockton
Assembly	Years	Member	Party
Prior to 1926 part of Toronto Southwest, Toronto Northwest and Parkdale ridings
17th	1926–1929	Fred McBrien	Conservative
18th	1929–1934	Fred McBrien	Conservative
Sourced from the Ontario Legislative Assembly
Merged into Dovercourt and Parkdale ridings after 1934

== Election results ==
1929 Ontario general election
Party	Candidate	Votes	%	±%
Conservative	Fred McBrien	8,731	71.06	+13.67
Liberal	James Gilchrist	3,555	28.94	+1.19
Total valid votes		12,286	99.55	
Total rejected ballots		56	0.45	–0.09
Turnout		12,342	40.42	–21.30
Eligible voters		30,538		
Conservative hold		Swing		+6.24
Source: Elections Ontario

1926 Ontario general election
Party	Candidate	Votes	%
Conservative	Fred McBrien	11,245	57.40
Liberal	Robert D. Stanley	5,435	27.74
Independent Conservative	Robert Stuart	2,912	14.86
Total valid votes		19,592	99.45
Total rejected ballots		108	0.55
Turnout		19,700	61.72
Eligible voters		31,919	
Conservative pickup new district.			
Source: Elections Ontario

== See also ==
- List of Ontario provincial electoral districts
- Canadian provincial electoral districts
