= Robert Roy Downie =

Canadian politician

Ontario MPP
- In office 1943–1945
- Preceded by: Charles Oliver Fairbank
- Succeeded by: Charles Janes
- Constituency: Lambton East

Personal details
- Born: March 19, 1896 Clachan, Oxford Township
- Died: 1985 (aged 88–89)
- Party: Liberal
- Spouse: Florence Kathleen Trestain (m. 1920)
- Occupation: Farmer

Robert Roy Downie (March 19, 1896 – 1985) was a farmer and politician in Ontario, Canada. He represented Lambton East in the Legislative Assembly of Ontario from 1943 to 1945 as a Liberal.

The son of John Downie and Mary Anne Wootton, he was born in Clachan, Oxford Township and was educated in Oxford township. In 1920, Downie married Florence Kathleen Trestain. Downie served in the Canadian army during World War I. He was warden for Lambton County in 1936.
