= 1926 Ontario general election =

Canadian provincial election

- December 1, 1926

112 seats in the 17th Legislative Assembly of Ontario 57 seats were needed for a majority
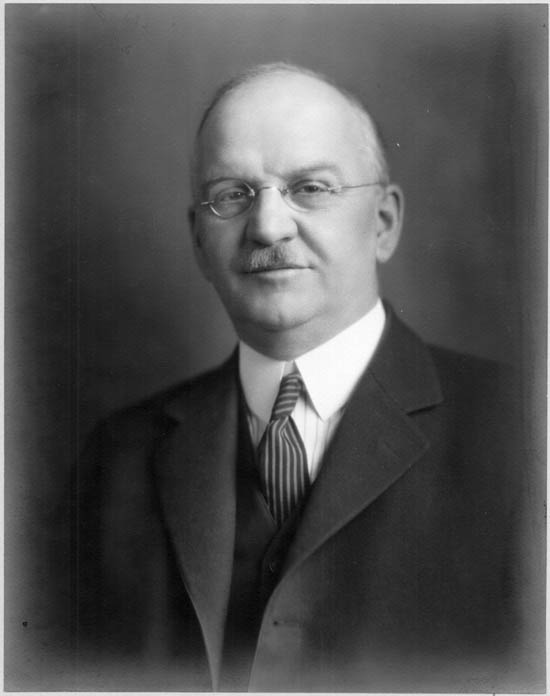

	First party	Second party
		LIB
Leader	George Howard Ferguson	W.E.N. Sinclair
Party	Conservative	Liberal
Leader since	December 2, 1920	1923
Leader's seat	Grenville	Ontario South
Last election	75	14
Seats won	72	14
Seat change	▼3	Steady
Percentage	57.6%	17.2%
Swing	▲7.8pp	▼4.1pp
	Third party	Fourth party
		UFO
Leader	William Raney	Leslie Oke
Party	Progressive	United Farmers
Leader since	January 1925	-
Leader's seat	Prince Edward	Lambton East
Last election	split from UFO	17
Seats won	10	3
Seat change	▲10	▼14
Percentage	6.3%	1.3%
Swing	–	▼19.8pp
Premier before election
G. Howard Ferguson
Conservative
Premier after election
G. Howard Ferguson
Conservative

The 1926 Ontario general election, frequently referred to as the temperance election, was the 17th general election held to determine the government for the Province of Ontario, Canada. It was held on December 1, 1926, to elect the 112 Members of the 17th Legislative Assembly of Ontario ("MLAs"). The election was predominantly contested over the government's proposal to replace prohibition with a government operated alcohol sales regime. The incumbent Conservative government, led by Premier Howard Ferguson, was re-elected for a second term in government with a majority mandate.

== Background ==
Two elections prior, the 1919 election, brought a complete realignment of political landscape in Ontario. It ended the Conservative-Liberal duopoly that persisted for the first half century of Ontario's existence. In that election, the new United Farmers of Ontario unexpectedly won two-fifth of the seats with only a fifth of the votes, and form a coalition government with the Labour Party, another party that had never entered government prior. The incumbent Conservative was render to third party status and the sitting Premier lost his own seat, the first occurrence of either of those events in Ontario, even though they actually won the largest share of the popular vote and by a sizable margin. The impact of that election continued to linger for the players in the 1926 election.

=== Partisan dynamics ===
Premier Ferguson was first elected in the 1905 election that ousted a three decade-old Liberal government and gave the province its first true Conservative administration led by James Whitney, and was recognized as a highly capable minister in the Hearst ministry and a skillful political organizer for the party, so much so he was entrusted to manage the party campaign in the disastrous 1919 election. When he was given the task to rebuild the party from the 1919 rubble in 1920, he was viewed, even by some peers in his party, in those early days with scepticism and suspicion, as he had developed a reputation of being too establishment, too Machiavellian, too flexible, likely corruptible. Once in government however, he quickly converted the doubters by presiding over a competent and pragmatic administration while running an efficient and disciplined political machine.

The Liberals, with their hopes of returning to power dashed in that 1919 election took a different route. They acted on their misgiving on their leader Hartley Dewart, a long-time nemesis of Ferguson, blaming him for devoting too much fire power on the Conservatives, on attacking Ferguson and on winning new grounds in the cities. Dewart was also against prohibition, openly questioned its unconstitutionality long before Ferguson ceased the issue. The Liberals pushing him out likely have removed a potent future rival for Ferguson. They leaned back on their rural base was led by Perth MPP Wellington Hay into the 1923 campaign, during which they lost half their seats, including Hay's. A dispirited rump, they entered the 1926 election being led by the lackluster interim leader W. E. N. Sinclair.

After losing the 1923 election after only one term in government, UFO general secretary James J. Morrison announced the organization's withdrawal from electoral politics without consulting the UFO parliamentary caucus. The party apparatus led by Morrison were often in dispute with the parliamentary wing during UFO's time in government. Fully recognizing that Sinclair would make a much weaker rival, Ferguson shrewdly exploited the infighting within UFO and blocked its leader Manning Doherty from becoming opposition leader citing Morrison's statement. In response, and probably pinning their hope in the federal Progressive in the 1921 election, the UFO caucus rebranded as the Progressive Party's Ontario wing. However following Doherty's retirement and the selection of former Attorney-General William Edgar Raney as leader, two of its member, Leslie Oke and Beniah Bowman, split from the group, and returned to their previous designation as United Farmers. Bowman resigned before the 1926 election. The distinction was largely ignored by the mainstream press in any event. While news reports would acknowledge Oke and candidates recruited by him as Farmers candidate, they were counted in the Progressive Party's tally in post election reports.

=== Temperance election ===
The principal issue of the campaign was the government's proposal to repeal the Ontario Temperance Act, replacing prohibition with government control of liquor sales. The Daily British Whig described it as "the greatest issue that has ever been placed before [the voters]". The issue pit the government against a united front of the two opposition parties the Ontario Prohibition Union.

Temperance advocates were particularly incensed by such a proposal so soon after the 1924 Ontario prohibition referendum where the temperance side secured a narrow victory. The overlooked the political considerations that confronted Ferguson. The large cities, the bedrock of Conservative support, all voted overwhelmingly wet, while rural area where the opposition drew their strength predominantly voted dry. The referendum made repealing prohibition both a policy and political imperative for the premier.

=== Additional labels ===
But the parties' positions respective positions were not uniformly shared within their ranks. For example, the fission in the Liberal caucus led four francophone caucus member to campaign under the banner of Independent Liberals to signal to voters that their intention to support the government on the issue, but would vote with their Liberal peers for everything else. The issue causes problems for conservative members as well, as many have pleaded dry to their local community during the referendum. Ferguson's attorney general, William Folger Nickle, of the Nickle Resolution's fame a few years prior as an MP, stood on principal and resigned from cabinet on the eve of dissolution. He sought re-election under the Prohibition Union's banner in Kingston and was soundly defeated, an unsurprising result given the wet side won Kingston by 15 points in the referendum.

=== A new political party? ===
The government proposal also forced the Ontario Prohibition Union, the leading pro-temperance platform and already a militant issue-focused lobby, to operate more like a political party. While they opted not to field "straight dry" candidates in all electoral districts as some of their leading members had advocated, they played an aggressive brokering role in ensuring the presence of a single strong candidate pledged to the dry cause in every electoral districts. In twenty-seven electoral districts they fielded straight prohibitionist candidates. Outside of Toronto, those candidates were all but in one instance the only opposition candidate in the field. (In Toronto and the one exception, Nipissing, the Liberal candidates in the field were wet, so any risk of vote split was on the wet side.)

In a majority of the districts, the union was a key player in brokering agreements among pro-temperance candidates, whether through heavy handed pressure tactic or by facilitating formal public primary ballots. In a small number of districts, they even backed dry Conservative candidates. Some of the candidates endorsed by the Union sought to highlight the endorsement by campaigning under hyphenated-prohibitionist labels, including two elected members who campaigned as Liberal-Prohibitionists and one another who campaigned as Farmer-Prohibitionist.

The two main opposition parties mostly avoided campaigning against each other so to minimize the split of the temperance vote. The polarized nature of this election also caused some local Liberal and Progressive associations to formally endorse the candidate for the other party in the district. About a dozen candidates campaiged as Liberal-Progressives or Progressive-Liberals. Four of them, the pair in Oxford county and the pair in Victoria county, were successful in their bids. (Note: Newman would later join the Liberal caucus in January 1927, upon being instructed by the Clerk of the Legislature to make a choice as to which leader to sit behind. He had wanted to remain a member of the Liberal-Progressive group. J.H. Mitchell (Simcoe Southwest) joined him in the move, saying that he "has always been a Liberal".) The presence of jointly nominated candidates left some residual issues to be resolved at the convening of the parliament.

The controverted election case that ultimately unseated Malcolm Alex McCallum, the Progressive members re-elected in Bruce South, paint a vivid picture of the Prohibition Union's aggressive role in narrowing the field. It was revealed during the trial that that Dr. A.J. Irwin, the president of the Ontario Prohibition Union (who was a public figure more prominent than most of the elected members due to his role as spokesman for the union) personally arranged multiple meetings convening the various pro-temperance candidates in Bruce county. The Union's South Bruce chapter president offered both the Liberal candidate John Anderson, a former MPP, and McCallum, the Progressive candidate and the incumbent MPP to reimburse their campaign expenses if they would withdraw in his favour, and was the primary driving force in actions that was the undoing of McCallum. McCallum was the only elected member unseated from the 17th Parliament by court proceedings..

Contests featuring candidates carrying different banners., by number of candidates (1926)
Candidates	Con	Lib	Prog	L-P	UFO	Lab	I-Con	I-Lib	Ind-Prog	Proh	LL	L-Proh	LLP	Total
1	3													3
2	90	37	13	10	3	2	1	1	1	20	2	3	1	184
3	17	8	3			1	3	6	1	5	1			45
4	1	1					1			1				4
5	1	1					2			1				5
Total	112	48	16	10	4	3	7	7	2	27	2	3	1	241

=== Acclamation ===
Three Conservatives were acclaimed, including a cabinet member, mines minister Charles McCrea.

The acclamation of Addington member William Black, who became speaker of this parliament, was a peculiar example of democracy denied by inadvertent errors and poorly drafted election law. The returning officers in that that instance erroneously ruled the candidate Frank Anglin's nomination paper to be invalid, and declared Black elected by acclamation at the close of nomination. Anglin sought to overturn the decision in the Ontario Supreme Court, which had no difficulty finding his nomination should have been accepted, a finding not contested by Black or the returning officer. The returning officer actually sought the Court's permission to invalidate his own decision and conduct a by-election. However, since nominations was closed and Black was formally acclaimed, the Court's jurisdiction to overturn the acclamation was limited to a controverted election, which required the existence of corrupted election practice to establish. Therefore, even thought none of the parties involved disputed that Black was acclaimed in error, the law as existed then provided no means for its correction.

Riding	Party	Candidate	Reason
Addington		William David Black	Nomination of F.A. Anglin (Prohibitionist) erroneously rejected by returning officer
Essex North		Paul Poisson	E.P. Tellier (Liberal and incumbent MLA) withdrew his nomination
Sudbury		Charles McCrea	Sole nominee

== Pre-election vacancy ==
When the legislature was dissolved, ten of its seat were vacant. Six of those seats had been vacant for over a year and a half, as those members left to contest the 1925 election, with two more leaving in advance of the 1926 contest. Where there were laws requiring byelections to be held, there was no central electoral authority at the time, and the duty of organizing polls felled on the shoulder of local returning officer. Since all but one of the resigned members were opposition members, Ferguson was in no hurry of filling them. With cooperation from the speaker, he was able to defer calling those byelections by leaving the returning offices also vacant. The seats that were vacant at dissolution were:

Vacant since April 1925 (6)
- Held by Liberals: Cochrane
- Held by Progressives: Kenora, Kent East, Norfolk North
- Held by Labour: Kenora
- Held by Conservative: Simcoe South
Vacant since August 1925 (1)
- Held by Conservative: London

Vacant since April 1926 (2)

- Held by Progressives: Manitoulin, Middlesex East

Vacant since October 1926 (1)

- Held by Liberal: Kent West

== Redistribution of seats ==
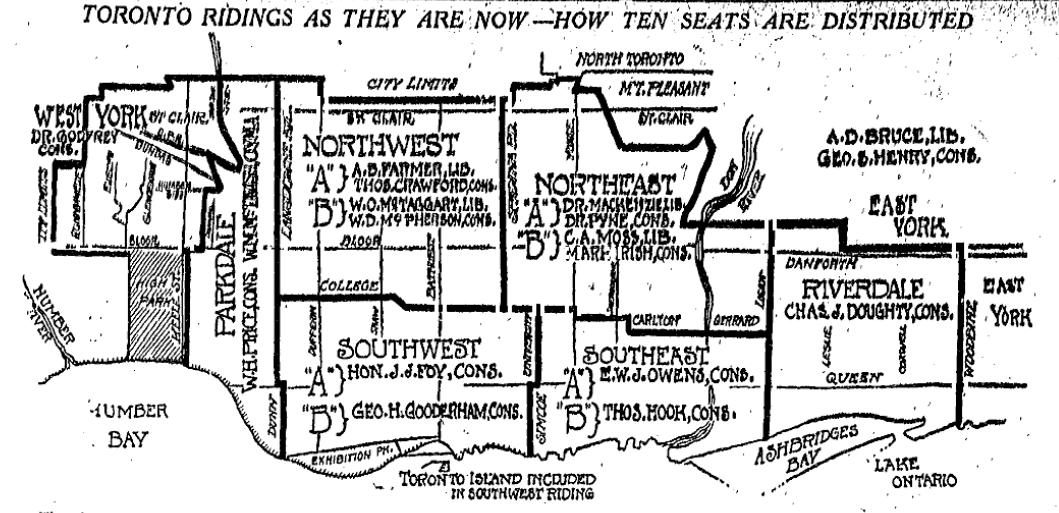
Toronto ridings, as constituted in 1914

Toronto ridings as reconstituted in 1926

Redistribution legislations were passed in 1925 and 1926 to realign various electoral districts. While the two acts only netted an increase of 1 seat overall in the legislature, they effected significant rebalancing of seat allocations, shifting seats from rural areas where population growth have been stagnant to cities that have experienced rapid population growth.

=== Toronto and York Township ===
The City of Toronto, a reliable Conservative bastion in the early 1900s, grew both its population and its geographically size dramatically in the first two decades of the twentieth century. In the 1926 round of the redistribution, the four dual-member electoral districts in Toronto (a feature introduced in 1908 for purpose of gerrymandering and one that was increasingly untenable), were abolished and replaced by single-member seats. New seats were also created for the area newly annexed from York Township. The city's delegation to the provincial legislature jump from ten seats to fifteen seats, while the delegation of its surrounding York Township's delegation grew from three to four.

=== Elsewhere in Ontario ===
Toronto was not the only city that gain seats however. Ottawa, Hamilton, London, and Windsor each gain an additional seat, along with the Cochrane District in the Northeast. Since the legislature only grew by one seats, the cities' gains translated to significant losses of representation to the rural areas. The change reflected the rapid urbanization of Ontario's population in the early decades of the twentieth century. The rural area of southwestern and midwestern Ontario, the driver of Ontario's population growth for much of the nineteenth century, experienced the steepest reduction in representation. The countries of Grey, Bruce, Huron, Middlesex, and Wellington were all reduced from three to two, while Norfolk was reduced from two to one.

Raney complained that the net effect of the redistribution was to transfer up to 11 seats from rural to urban voters, and thus "to secure the re-election of the Ferguson Government". While he was correct in his assessments of the effect, and his grievance entirely unsurprising given the Progressive Party was the biggest beneficiary of rural area being overrepresented. His criticism however had no merit from a representation-by-population stand point. If anything, the redistribution did not go far enough in providing urban areas their fair share of representation. (Note: When measured against the 1921 census. Case in point. The five rural counties in southwestern Ontario that lost a third of their seats - Huron, Grey, Bruce, Middlesex, and Wellington - together accounted for 8.5% of the province's population according to 1921 census. With 10 seats, they were holding 8.9% in a house of 112, and therefore were still slightly over-represented. Toronto & York Township accounted for 22% of the province's population in 1921. With 18 seats between them, they were still under-represented by 6 seats.) In driving the wedge between rural and urban, he overlooked a point for which criticism can be justified, which is the unevenness of the redistribution. The rural southwest, where the Progressive Party and the Liberal Party remained strong, had their representation brought down to numbers more proportionate to their population, while the rural area in the eastern part of the province, where the Conservative had more residual pockets of strength, continued to be wildly over represented. (Note: A case in point would be Raney's own newly acquired Prince Edward, with a population that accounted for 0.57% of the province population, making it a prime candidate for merger, especially given its neighbor Lennox and Addington district was in a similar situation. Yet they continued to each be represented by their own members.)

General Region	Electoral district			effect
General Region	Pre-redistribution	process	Post-redistribution	effect
Toronto & York ▲ +5	Toronto Northwest, Toronto Southwest	reorganized	Bellwoods, Dovercourt, St. Andrew	▼ −1
Toronto & York ▲ +5	Toronto Northeast, Toronto Southeast; Riverdale	reorganized	St. Patrick, (Note: Also took in sliver of Toronto Southwest) St. George, St. David; Riverdale, Greenwood	no change
Toronto & York ▲ +5	Parkdale	portions removed	to create Brockton (Note: Also took in slivers of Toronto Northwest and Toronto Southwest)	▲ +1
Toronto & York ▲ +5	York West	portions removed	to create High Park, York South	▲ +2
Toronto & York ▲ +5	York East	portions removed	to create Beaches, Eglinton,Woodbine (Note: Also took in portions of Riverdale)	▲ +3
North ▲ +1	Cochrane	divided	Cochrane North, Cochrane South	▲ +1
East ▲ +1	Ottawa West	divided	Ottawa North, Ottawa South	▲ +1
Southeastern ▼ −2	Frontenac, Lennox	merged	Frontenac—Lennox	▼ −1
Southeastern ▼ −2	Northumberland East, Northumberland West	merged	Northumberland	▼ −1
Southeastern ▼ −2	Peterborough East, Peterborough West	reorganized	Peterborough City, Peterborough County	no change
Central no change	Durham East and Durham West	merged	Durham	▼ −1
Central no change	Simcoe South, Simcoe West	merged	Simcoe Southwest	▼ −1
Central no change	Hamilton East, Hamilton West	portions removed	to create Hamilton Centre	▲ +1
Midwestern ▼ −5	Brant, Brant South	reorganized	Brant County, Brantford	no change
Midwestern ▼ −5	Bruce West	eliminated	distributed to Bruce North, Bruce South	▼ −1
Midwestern ▼ −5	Grey Centre	eliminated	distributed to Grey North, Grey South	▼ −1
Midwestern ▼ −5	Huron Centre	eliminated	distributed to Huron North and Huron South	▼ −1
Midwestern ▼ −5	Norfolk North, Norfolk South	merged	Norfolk	▼ −1
Midwestern ▼ −5	Wellington East, Wellington West	merged	Wellington Northeast	▼ −1
Southwest ▲ +1	London	divided	London North, London South	▲ +1
Southwest ▲ +1	Middlesex East	eliminated	distributed to Middlesex North, Middlesex West	▼ −1
Southwest ▲ +1	Windsor	divided	Windsor East, Windsor West	▲ +1

== Election outcome ==
The Ontario Conservative Party, led by Howard Ferguson, was re-elected for a second term in government. There were several disputes in the selection of candidates: in Port Arthur, Donald Hogarth was one of two Conservative candidates—the other being the incumbent Francis Keefer—who were selected in parallel meetings arising from a dispute over the validity of the list of delegates.

The Ontario Liberal Party, led by W.E.N. Sinclair, obtained nineteen seats, inclusive of two Liberal Prohibitionists (one of them was initially erroneously reported by the press as a Liberal-Progressive) who were for all intents and purposes part of the Liberal caucus and four francophone Independent Liberals who could be count on to vote with their Liberal peers on matter other than temperance. Of the four members elected as Liberal-Progressives, one was a long standing Liberal endorsed by the local Progressive association, and more opted to sit with them, boasting their rank to twenty-one when the parliament convened in January 1927.

The fracture of the UFO, together with a large number of resignations from MPPs (of which five chose to run federally in 1925, and two more in 1926) significantly changed the composition of the Assembly. The Progressives won eleven seats, inclusive of one who campaign as a Farmer-Prohibitionist, and one as Independent Progressive. Of the four that were elected as Liberal-Progressive, two were former UFO MPPs, both opted to sit with the Progressive with their former colleagues, boosting their rank to thirdteen

Oke was the only United Farmers MPP at dissolution of the previous parliament and was re-elected as such. He was joined by Thomas Farquhar from Manitoulin and Farquhar Oliver from Grey South, the latter, the youngest member elected and later a Liberal Party leader, won with the assistance of federal MP Agnes MacPhail.

Karl Homuth of Waterloo South was the only Labour MPP returned. His declared his intention to support the government during the campaign, and was admitted to the Conservative caucus soon after the election, leading to the end of the Labour's presence in the legislature.

=== Summary of results ===
The following is a high level summary of elections results, compiled using data made available by Elections Ontario with additional adjustments (as noted with footnotes) based on information available from contemporaneous sources.

Political party		Leader	Seats					Votes		
Political party		Leader	1923	Dissl	Cand.	1926	(Note: Changes were calculated based on the total of the party's tally and the tallies of its related categories.)±	Votes	Share	± (pp)
	Conservative	Howard Ferguson	75	74	112	72	▼ −1	640,515	55.87%	▲ +7.86
	Independent Conservative	—N/a	–	–	7	2	▼ −1	20,144	1.76%	▲ +7.86
	Liberal	W.E.N. Sinclair	14	11	48	(Note: William Newman (Victoria North) as a candidate/1926 elected re-assigned from Liberal to Liberal-Progressive - Newman formally contested the election as a fusion candidate, and expressed his wished to remain so, but was advised by clerk of the legislature that he must opt to sit behind one of the two leaders, upon which he declared for the Liberals. His vote tally of 3,207 also reallocated.) 13	▲ +4 (Note: Of the four members elected as Liberal-Progressive candidates, two of them, Newman and Scoot, opted to join the Liberal caucus and the other two, Sandy and Ross, joined their former colleagues in the Progressive caucus.)	193,606	16.61%	▼ −1.85
	Independent Liberal	—N/a	(Note: Edmond Proulx's (Prescott) 1923 seat/dissolution seat re-assigned from Independent to Independent-Liberal - Proulx contested the 1923 election as an independent, defeating an official Liberal candidate, but joined the Liberals ranks in legislature and contested the 1926 election as an independent-Liberal. Counted here for comparasion purpose.) 1	1	7	4	▲ +4	21,002	1.83%	▼ −1.85
P	Liberal-Prohibitionist	—N/a	–	–	3	(Note: John Henry Mitchell (Simcoe Southwest) as a candidate/1926 elected re-assigned from Liberal-Progressive to Liberal-Prohibitionist - is erroneously identified in official records as Liberal-Progressive due to press reports following election. Mitchell made repeated formal statements in early 1927 noting that he campaigned as a Liberal-Prohibitionist with the support but not formal endorsement of Simcoe Progressive, and confirming that he "(have) always been a Liberal". He repeated this clarification in his maiden speech in the legislature. Mitchell's vote tally of 5,779 also reallocated.) 2	▲ +4	14,894	1.29%	▼ −1.85
	Liberal-Labour	—N/a	–	–	2	0	▲ +4	4,633	0.40%	▼ −1.85
P	Lib-Lab-Prohibitionist	—N/a	–	–	1	0	▲ +4	2,298	0.20%	▼ −1.85
	Progressive	William Raney	17	11	16	(Note: Thomas Slack (Dufferin) as a candidate/1926 elected re-assigned from Progressive to Farmer-Prohibitionist - Thomas Slack (Dufferin), a former UFO MPP, As a former UFO MPP, campaigned consistently as a "Farmer Prohibitionist" candidate in 1926 and was strongly supported by the local Prohibition Union, and identified as a Progressive member instead of United Farmers following election. Slack's vote tally of 4,478 also re-allocated.) 9	▼ −3	67,799	5.91%	▼ −12.9
	United Farmers	Leslie Oke	17	1	3	3	▼ −3	15,417	1.34%	▼ −12.9
P	Farmer-Prohibitionist	—N/a	–	–	1	1	▼ −3	4,478	0.39%	▼ −12.9
	Independent Progressive	—N/a	–	–	2	1	▼ −3	6,029	0.51%	▼ −12.9
	Liberal-Progressive	(joint endorsements)	–	–	9	4	—N/a	46,047	4.02%	—N/a
	Labour	(ceased to be a formal party)	4	3	3	1	▼ −3	14,794	1.29%	▼ −3.47
	Independent	—N/a	–	–	1	–	▼ −1	2,912	0.25%	▼ −1.37
	Prohibitionist	A.J. Irwin (Note: Rev Dr A.J. Irwin, a Methodist Church minister, was elected President of the Ontario Prohibition Union in January 1926 and was the primary spokesperson for the union throughout the campaign. However did not contest the election himself. The most prominent Prohibitionist candidate was William Nickle, who resigned as Attorney General over the issue and was unsuccessful in his re-election bid. The most senior official from the Union that stood was Treasurer Ralph Warren, who was the only candidate against the Conservative incumbent in Renfrew North.)	–	–	27	0	new	92,435	8.06%	new
Total			111	(Note: Ten seats were vacant.)101	241	112		1,146,502	▲ +193410	
Rejected ballots Declined ballots						6,123; 662			▼ −4570 ▼ −2245	
Registered voters / total participation / turnout						1,792,757		1,153,287	64.33%	▲ +5.93

Ferguson's majority mandate undisputed, exact seat counts subject to debate

Partisan affiliations were not recorded in contemporaneous formal election records. While formal nomination contests occurred within some political parties by this point, there were neither requirements nor possibilities for candidates to formally register their partisan affiliations. (Note: In Canada, it was not until the 1970s that the "option" of registration become available to political entities. While candidate endorsed by a registered party may have their political affiliation printed on federal election ballots since then, their inclusion on Ontario election ballots did not occur until 2007.) Affiliations data for elections in earlier time are drawn from records maintained by the Legislative Library, which were compiled decades after the fact. Even in contemporaneous reports, affiliations data were a mixture of both undisputed declaration (made by the candidates or the parties), assessments by third parties such as the press, and presumptions from other events such as acceptance of specific offices. Such data inevitably comes with some uncertainties, time lags, or inaccuracies, reflecting the lesser formality and permeance in partisan affiliation in that era.

One should also keep in mind that it was possible for candidates to be endorsed by more than one party. With no legal requirement for registration, it was also possible for candidates to present themselves under slightly modified party banners for communications purposes, often with tacit concurrence of their party brass. These factors were particularly present in this election due to the focus on temperance.

When the dust settled in the days following the 1926 election, the incumbent Conservative government led by Premier Howard Ferguson had undisputedly secure a resounding mandate for his plan to repeal the Ontario Temperance Act and to implement a government controlled liquor retail system. Well over 70 members of his Conservative Party were elected to the new house with 112 seats.

While the overall big picture was abundantly clear, the finer details such as the exact seat counts or the precise make up of the opposition bench was less clear for a number of reasons unique to this election:

- Independent candidates (7 elected) - The principal campaign issue in the 1926 election was the government's plan to end prohibition in Ontario. The issue caused factures among both the governing Conservative Party and the Liberal Party. The incumbent Liberals who were "wet" contested the election as "Independent Liberal" candidates to signal their support for the government's plan and alignment with the opposition Liberals on other issues. Other candidates campaigned as independent-hyphen candidates to broaden their electoral appeal, most with tacit concurrence of their own party. Of the seven members who were elected independent labels, only one of them faced competition from a formally sanctioned candidate from their own party.
- Prohibitionist candidates (3 elected explicitly as such) - The Ontario Prohibition Union, the leading pro-temperance force in the 1924 Ontario prohibition referendum, operated as a militant political action committee in putting forward candidates pleadged to the dry cause in all electoral districts. While in some districts they put forward their own straight prohibitionist candidates, in most cases they broker agreements among pro-temperance candidates whether through a heavy hand behind closed door or through facilitating formal primary ballots. In a small number of districts, they even backed dry Conservative candidates, the most prominent candidate being former Attorney General William Nickle who resigned from the Ferguson ministry at the eve of the election call. Some of the candidates endorsed by the Union sought to highlight the endorsement by adding the prohibitionist, including three elected members.
- Progressive and United Farmer candidates - The members from the earlier United Farmer-Labour government joined forces and rebranded themselves as the Progressive Party. Two incumbent split off and resume their old United Farmer label upon the election of William Raney a non-farmer, as party leader. Many press report simply classified them all as Progressive Party candidate, even thought some of them explicitly repudiated the party. Many Progressive Party candidates campaigned by stressing presenting themselves as farmer candidates, adding to the confusion.

Party	Globe Toronto	Toronto Daily Star	Ottawa Citizen	Border Cities Star	Associated Press
Party	Dec 2	Dec 2	Dec 2	Dec 3	Dec 2
Conservative	75	75	74	74	75
Liberal	14	14	14	14	14
Progressive	10	13	13	13	12
Liberal Progressive	5	5	5	5	5
Independent Liberal	4	3	4	3	4
Labour	1	1	1	1	1
Prohibitionist	1				
Uncertain	2	1	1	2	2

- Liberal-Progressive and Progressive-Liberal candidates - in most electoral districts, the local Liberal Party and Progressive Party associations were able to reach agreements to field not both field candidates, thanks in large part to aggressive pressuring from the Ontario Prohibition Union. In some instances, the agreed upon candidate received the formal endorsement from the other party, and campaign as jointly nominated candidates. Press report immediately following the election identified five such candidates.

The main press outlets reported slightly different numbers on the day after the election. All outlets treated the Liberal-Progressives and the Independent Liberals as distinct categories, but did not report separate tallies for the United Farmers, or the members elected with additional Prohibitionist or independent labels.

=== Impact of the Prohibition Union ===
The Ontario Prohibition Union was unsuccessful in getting any of their twenty-seven sanctioned candidates elected, not even the former Attorney General Nickle. But their impact was undeniable. Multi-cornered local contests had become the norms in Ontario elections upon the rise of United Farmer in 1919. In both the 1919 election and the 1923 elections less than half of the districts featured heading to head contests. (The same was true for Ontario electoral districts in the 1921 and 1925 federal elections), In this election however, the number of 2-way contests jumped up to 90. Only 19 contests featured three or more candidates.

In those 19 contests, the presence of more than two candidates were mostly inconsequential to the temperance cause in any event, either because the winner won by more than half the votes, or because the potential for vote split existed on the wet side. The only contest where the presence of two dry candidates could have allowed a wet candidate to come up in the middle was Bruce North, a contest that also ended up in court in proceedings that were related to those mentioned above for Bruce South. The reduction of Bruce country from three to two seats pitted Bruce West Liberal incumbent Alexander Mewhinney against Bruce North Progressive incumbent William Fenton. Mewhinney was ultimately successful with 38% vote share, while Fenton with only 30% came in third behind the Conservative candidate. Despite being the one who could have played spoiler to the contest and a substantial margin behind, Fenton challenged Mewhinney's victory alleging federal trade minister James Malcolm, the MP for Bruce North, offered to secure him a federal appointment should he withdraw (an allegation the court gave little credence to for lack of any evidence), and that the existence of a resolution to reimburse the expense of any candidate who withdraw, a resolution which Fenton was a potential beneficiary. The court summarily dismissed Fenton's challenge and sustained Mewhinney's victory.

== Results – vote and seat summaries ==
Ternary plots - shift of electoral support (1923-1926)
1923

1926
Electoral districts identified by colours of winning parties

=== Synopsis of local results ===
:

= incumbent switched allegiance for the election
= not incumbent; previously elected as a UFO MLA
= not incumbent; previously elected as a Labour MLA
= not incumbent; previously elected as a Liberal-Temperance MLA

= petition against election withdrawn
= petition against election dismissed
= election declared void
= turnout is above provincial average
= acclaimed

Results by riding - 1926 Ontario general election (Note: "1926 General Election". elections.on.ca. Elections Ontario. EO data errors on political affiliations adjusted to conform with Canadian Annual Review listing)
Riding		Winning party					Turnout (Note: including spoilt ballots)	Votes													
#	Name	Party	Votes	Share	Margin #	Margin %	Turnout	Con	Lib	Proh	Prog	L-Prog	UFO	Labour	I-Lib	I-Con	I-Prog	L-Proh	LL	LLP	Total
001	Addington	Con	acclaimed																		
002	Algoma	Con	3,554	61.50%	1,329	23.00%	54.94%	3,554	–	–	2,225	–	–	–	–	–	–	–	–	–	5,779
003	Brant County	Prog	4,114	55.70%	842	11.40%	70.74%	3,272	–	–	4,114	–	–	–	–	–	–	–	–	–	7,386
004	Brantford	Con	7,751	55.73%	1,595	11.47%	71.11%	7,751	6,156	–	–	–	–	–	–	–	–	–	–	–	13,907
005	Brockville	Con	4,881	60.69%	1,720	21.39%	71.92%	4,881	–	3,161	–	–	–	–	–	–	–	–	–	–	8,042
006	Bruce North	Lib	3,601	38.39%	663	7.07%	69.63%	2,938	3,601	–	2,840	–	–	–	–	–	–	–	–	–	9,379
007	Bruce South	Prog	4,922	50.66%	128	1.32%	72.30%	4,794	–	–	4,922	–	–	–	–	–	–	–	–	–	9,716
008	Carleton	Con	4,530	60.18%	1,533	20.37%	61.02%	4,530	–	–	–	2,997	–	–	–	–	–	–	–	–	7,527
009	Cochrane North	Con	2,886	54.35%	462	8.70%	56.22%	2,886	–	–	–	–	–	–	2,424	–	–	–	–	–	5,310
010	Cochrane South	Con	5,124	68.17%	2,732	36.35%	38.49%	5,124	–	–	–	–	–	–	–	–	–	–	2,392	–	7,516
011	Dufferin	Prog	4,478	58.87%	1,349	17.73%	73.73%	3,129	–	–	4,478	–	–	–	–	–	–	–	–	–	7,607
012	Dundas	L-Proh	4,407	55.22%	833	10.44%	76.76%	3,574	–	–	–	–	–	–	–	–	–	4,407	–	–	7,981
013	Durham	Lib	6,639	55.27%	1,267	10.55%	73.87%	5,372	6,639	–	–	–	–	–	–	–	–	–	–	–	12,011
014	Elgin East	Lib	4,122	55.51%	818	11.02%	71.48%	3,304	4,122	–	–	–	–	–	–	–	–	–	–	–	7,426
015	Elgin West	Con	6,818	52.52%	655	5.05%	65.80%	6,818	6,163	–	–	–	–	–	–	–	–	–	–	–	12,981
016	Essex North	Con	acclaimed																		
017	Essex South	Lib	4,560	51.20%	213	2.39%	65.34%	4,347	4,560	–	–	–	–	–	–	–	–	–	–	–	8,907
018	Fort William	Con	5,286	76.10%	3,626	52.20%	50.56%	5,286	1,660	–	–	–	–	–	–	–	–	–	–	–	6,946
019	Frontenac—Lennox	Lib	4,625	53.24%	563	6.48%	66.49%	4,062	4,625	–	–	–	–	–	–	–	–	–	–	–	8,687
020	Glengarry	Con	4,442	63.17%	1,852	26.34%	63.81%	4,442	2,590	–	–	–	–	–	–	–	–	–	–	–	7,032
021	Grenville	Con	4,617	58.02%	1,277	16.05%	75.71%	4,617	–	3,340	–	–	–	–	–	–	–	–	–	–	7,957
022	Grey North	Prog	8,423	63.95%	3,674	27.89%	67.85%	4,749	–	–	8,423	–	–	–	–	–	–	–	–	–	13,172
023	Grey South	UFO	7,100	54.45%	1,160	8.90%	72.16%	5,940	–	–	–	–	7,100	–	–	–	–	–	–	–	13,040
024	Haldimand	Lib	5,212	53.97%	767	7.94%	73.29%	4,445	5,212	–	–	–	–	–	–	–	–	–	–	–	9,657
025	Halton	Con	6,164	51.53%	365	3.05%	73.34%	6,164	–	–	5,799	–	–	–	–	–	–	–	–	–	11,963
026	Hamilton Centre	Con	9,784	75.90%	7,094	55.03%	62.30%	9,784	2,690	–	–	–	–	416	–	–	–	–	–	–	12,890
027	Hamilton East	Con	10,174	69.07%	5,617	38.13%	64.76%	10,174	4,557	–	–	–	–	–	–	–	–	–	–	–	14,731
028	Hamilton West	Con	8,436	73.48%	5,392	46.97%	65.73%	8,436	3,044	–	–	–	–	–	–	–	–	–	–	–	11,480
029	Hastings East	Con	3,983	62.68%	1,612	25.37%	67.43%	3,983	–	2,371	–	–	–	–	–	–	–	–	–	–	6,354
030	Hastings North	Con	4,008	67.23%	2,054	34.45%	60.92%	4,008	–	1,954	–	–	–	–	–	–	–	–	–	–	5,962
031	Hastings West	Con	6,273	61.96%	2,421	23.91%	70.54%	6,273	–	3,852	–	–	–	–	–	–	–	–	–	–	10,125
032	Huron North	Lib	6,386	58.97%	1,942	17.93%	73.57%	4,444	6,386	–	–	–	–	–	–	–	–	–	–	–	10,830
033	Huron South	Prog	6,003	57.93%	1,644	15.87%	72.86%	4,359	–	–	6,003	–	–	–	–	–	–	–	–	–	10,362
034	Kent East	Prog	4,562	51.67%	1,252	14.18%	73.73%	3,310	957	–	4,562	–	–	–	–	–	–	–	–	–	8,829
035	Kent West	Con	8,443	57.24%	2,135	14.47%	64.22%	8,443	6,308	–	–	–	–	–	–	–	–	–	–	–	14,751
036	Kenora	Con	2,641	52.30%	400	7.92%	52.13%	2,641	–	–	–	–	–	–	–	–	168	–	2,241	–	5,050
037	Kingston	Con	6,705	60.45%	2,319	20.91%	76.05%	6,705	–	4,386	–	–	–	–	–	–	–	–	–	–	11,091
038	Lambton East	UFO	6,075	57.88%	1,654	15.76%	68.57%	4,421	–	–	–	–	6,075	–	–	–	–	–	–	–	10,496
039	Lambton West	Con	7,092	60.72%	2,504	21.44%	68.73%	7,092	–	–	4,588	–	–	–	–	–	–	–	–	–	11,680
040	Lanark North	Con	3,589	51.70%	236	3.40%	70.61%	3,589	–	–	–	3,353	–	–	–	–	–	–	–	–	6,942
041	Lanark South	Con	3,870	56.77%	923	13.54%	62.49%	3,870	2,947	–	–	–	–	–	–	–	–	–	–	–	6,817
042	Leeds	Con	3,702	51.48%	213	2.96%	69.36%	3,702	3,489	–	–	–	–	–	–	–	–	–	–	–	7,191
043	Lincoln	Prog	4,348	56.37%	983	12.74%	65.45%	3,365	–	–	4,348	–	–	–	–	–	–	–	–	–	7,713
044	London North	Con	7,763	61.83%	2,970	23.65%	60.55%	7,763	–	4,793	–	–	–	–	–	–	–	–	–	–	12,556
045	London South	Con	9,064	63.17%	3,779	26.34%	69.15%	9,064	–	–	–	–	–	5,285	–	–	–	–	–	–	14,349
046	Manitoulin	UFO	2,242	51.13%	99	2.26%	65.26%	2,143	–	–	–	–	2,242	–	–	–	–	–	–	–	4,385
047	Middlesex North	I-Prog	5,861	56.04%	1,264	12.09%	73.06%	4,597	–	–	–	–	–	–	–	–	5,861	–	–	–	10,458
048	Middlesex West	Prog	5,723	63.36%	2,413	26.71%	66.94%	3,310	–	–	5,723	–	–	–	–	–	–	–	–	–	9,033
049	Muskoka	Con	4,206	57.83%	1,139	15.66%	65.47%	4,206	–	3,067	–	–	–	–	–	–	–	–	–	–	7,273
050	Niagara Falls	Con	7,900	68.58%	4,281	37.16%	52.80%	7,900	3,619	–	–	–	–	–	–	–	–	–	–	–	11,519
051	Nipissing	Con	5,215	61.09%	3,414	39.99%	55.81%	5,215	–	1,521	–	–	–	–	1,801	–	–	–	–	–	8,537
052	Norfolk	Con	7,421	54.64%	1,260	9.28%	79.24%	7,421	6,161	–	–	–	–	–	–	–	–	–	–	–	13,582
053	Northumberland	Lib	7,612	53.46%	985	6.92%	72.27%	6,627	7,612	–	–	–	–	–	–	–	–	–	–	–	14,239
054	Ontario North	Prog	3,878	55.58%	779	11.17%	75.02%	3,099	–	–	3,878	–	–	–	–	–	–	–	–	–	6,977
055	Ontario South	Lib	8,901	57.30%	2,268	14.60%	72.73%	6,633	8,901	–	–	–	–	–	–	–	–	–	–	–	15,534
056	Ottawa East	I-Lib	5,195	43.86%	418	3.53%	53.60%	4,777	–	–	–	–	–	–	5,195	1,872	–	–	–	–	11,844
057	Ottawa North	Con	9,042	67.59%	4,707	35.19%	43.91%	9,042	4,335	–	–	–	–	–	–	–	–	–	–	–	13,377
058	Ottawa South	Con	9,171	62.27%	3,615	24.55%	56.95%	9,171	5,556	–	–	–	–	–	–	–	–	–	–	–	14,727
059	Oxford North	L-Prog	6,012	58.88%	1,813	17.76%	68.51%	4,199	–	–	–	6,012	–	–	–	–	–	–	–	–	10,211
060	Oxford South	L-Prog	5,793	56.97%	1,418	13.95%	73.59%	4,375	–	–	–	5,793	–	–	–	–	–	–	–	–	10,168
061	Parry Sound	Con	4,628	60.85%	1,650	21.69%	57.33%	4,628	2,978	–	–	–	–	–	–	–	–	–	–	–	7,606
062	Peel	Con	6,193	51.50%	361	3.00%	68.46%	6,193	–	–	5,832	–	–	–	–	–	–	–	–	–	12,025
063	Perth North	Con	7,350	55.97%	1,568	11.94%	61.23%	7,350	5,782	–	–	–	–	–	–	–	–	–	–	–	13,132
064	Perth South	Lib	4,176	53.14%	494	6.29%	70.66%	3,682	4,176	–	–	–	–	–	–	–	–	–	–	–	7,858
065	Peterborough City	Con	6,396	57.33%	1,636	14.66%	72.87%	6,396	4,760	–	–	–	–	–	–	–	–	–	–	–	11,156
066	Peterborough County	Lib	3,261	54.57%	546	9.14%	67.35%	2,715	3,261	–	–	–	–	–	–	–	–	–	–	–	5,976
067	Port Arthur	Con	2,683	38.31%	172	2.46%	60.40%	5,194 (Note: two candidates nominated)	1,810	–	–	–	–	–	–	–	–	–	–	–	7,004
068	Prescott	I-Lib	2,855	35.56%	24	0.30%	66.17%	5,173	–	–	–	–	–	–	2,855	–	–	–	–	–	8,028
069	Prince Edward	Prog	4,378	50.28%	49	0.56%	80.46%	4,329	–	–	4,378	–	–	–	–	–	–	–	–	–	8,707
070	Rainy River	Con	2,230	48.18%	777	16.79%	55.89%	2,230	–	–	–	–	–	–	1,453	945	–	–	–	–	4,628
071	Renfrew North	Con	5,000	59.74%	1,630	19.47%	58.40%	5,000	–	3,370	–	–	–	–	–	–	–	–	–	–	8,370
072	Renfrew South	Con	5,208	56.92%	1,267	13.85%	63.27%	5,208	–	–	–	3,941	–	–	–	–	–	–	–	–	9,149
073	Russell	I-Lib	5,231	42.86%	983	8.05%	66.40%	4,248	–	2,725	–	–	–	–	5,231	–	–	–	–	–	12,204
074	St. Catharines	I-Con	8,669	72.91%	5,448	45.82%	60.51%	–	–	3,221	–	–	–	–	–	8,669	–	–	–	–	11,890
075	Sault Ste. Marie	Con	5,497	77.38%	3,890	54.76%	38.96%	5,497	–	1,607	–	–	–	–	–	–	–	–	–	–	7,104
076	Simcoe Centre	Con	5,315	50.93%	195	1.87%	70.47%	5,315	5,120	–	–	–	–	–	–	–	–	–	–	–	10,435
077	Simcoe East	Con	7,312	55.84%	1,530	11.68%	71.09%	7,312	–	–	–	5,782	–	–	–	–	–	–	–	–	13,094
078	Simcoe Southwest	L-Prog	5,779	52.03%	452	4.07%	68.41%	5,327	–	–	–	5,779	–	–	–	–	–	–	–	–	11,106
079	Stormont	Con	7,101	65.97%	3,438	31.94%	66.98%	7,101	3,663	–	–	–	–	–	–	–	–	–	–	–	10,764
080	Sturgeon Falls	I-Lib	2,043	49.26%	103	2.48%	50.97%	1,940	–	–	164	–	–	–	2,043	–	–	–	–	–	4,147
081	Sudbury	Con	acclaimed																		
082	Temiskaming	Con	4,048	63.79%	1,750	27.58%	45.36%	4,048	–	–	–	–	–	–	–	–	–	–	–	2,298	6,346
083	Victoria North	L-Prog	3,207	52.26%	277	4.51%	70.03%	2,930	–	–	–	3,207	–	–	–	–	–	–	–	–	6,137
084	Victoria South	L-Prog	4,632	53.38%	587	6.77%	74.48%	4,045	–	–	–	4,632	–	–	–	–	–	–	–	–	8,677
085	Waterloo North	Con	9,500	69.03%	5,238	38.06%	49.84%	9,500	–	–	–	–	–	–	–	–	–	4,262	–	–	13,762
086	Waterloo South	Lab	9,093	62.01%	3,523	24.03%	67.91%	–	–	5,570	–	–	–	9,093	–	–	–	–	–	–	14,663
087	Welland	Con	7,697	69.54%	4,325	39.07%	56.34%	7,697	3,372	–	–	–	–	–	–	–	–	–	–	–	11,069
088	Wellington Northeast	Lib	6,601	62.24%	2,596	24.48%	71.26%	4,005	6,601	–	–	–	–	–	–	–	–	–	–	–	10,606
089	Wellington South	Con	8,044	53.04%	921	6.07%	74.20%	8,044	–	–	–	7,123	–	–	–	–	–	–	–	–	15,167
090	Wentworth North	Con	4,817	54.55%	803	9.09%	69.76%	4,817	4,014	–	–	–	–	–	–	–	–	–	–	–	8,831
091	Wentworth South	Con	8,383	67.38%	4,324	34.75%	62.85%	8,383	4,059	–	–	–	–	–	–	–	–	–	–	–	12,442
092	Windsor East	Con	9,750	83.70%	7,851	67.40%	48.24%	9,750	–	1,899	–	–	–	–	–	–	–	–	–	–	11,649
093	Windsor West	Con	8,741	77.79%	6,245	55.58%	47.95%	8,741	–	2,496	–	–	–	–	–	–	–	–	–	–	11,237
094	Beaches	Con	9,590	73.08%	6,058	46.17%	64.83%	9,590	–	3,532	–	–	–	–	–	–	–	–	–	–	13,122
095	Woodbine	Con	9,578	78.28%	6,920	56.55%	60.61%	9,578	2,658	–	–	–	–	–	–	–	–	–	–	–	12,236
096	Greenwood	Con	9,101	78.64%	6,629	57.28%	58.23%	9,101	2,472	–	–	–	–	–	–	–	–	–	–	–	11,573
097	Riverdale	Con	8,832	69.12%	4,886	38.24%	61.96%	8,832	–	3,946	–	–	–	–	–	–	–	–	–	–	12,778
098	Eglinton	Con	10,230	61.73%	3,887	23.45%	78.03%	10,230	6,343	–	–	–	–	–	–	–	–	–	–	–	16,573
099	St. David	Con	10,948	77.68%	7,803	55.37%	62.81%	10,948	3,145	–	–	–	–	–	–	–	–	–	–	–	14,093
100	St. George	Con	7,865	56.34%	4,881	34.97%	66.62%	7,865	729	2,984	–	–	–	–	–	2,381	–	–	–	–	13,959
101	St. Patrick	Con	6,339	69.64%	4,145	45.53%	65.48%	6,339	570	2,194	–	–	–	–	–	–	–	–	–	–	9,103
102	St. Andrews	Con	4,536	44.00%	1,171	11.36%	67.37%	4,536	311	2,097	–	–	–	–	–	3,365	–	–	–	–	10,309
103	Bellwoods	Con	9,452	76.79%	6,595	53.58%	62.09%	9,452	–	–	–	–	–	–	–	–	–	2,857	–	–	12,309
104	Bracondale	Con	10,563	69.41%	7,560	49.67%	70.33%	10,563	1,653	3,003	–	–	–	–	–	–	–	–	–	–	15,219
105	Dovercourt	Con	6,239	66.93%	3,156	33.86%	62.07%	6,239	3,083	–	–	–	–	–	–	–	–	–	–	–	9,322
106	Brockton	Con	11,245	57.40%	5,810	29.65%	61.72%	11,245	5,435	–	–	–	–	–	–	2,912	–	–	–	–	19,592
107	Parkdale	Con	8,915	65.44%	4,207	30.88%	66.23%	8,915	–	4,708	–	–	–	–	–	–	–	–	–	–	13,623
108	High Park	Con	10,466	61.13%	3,810	22.25%	76.55%	10,466	–	6,656	–	–	–	–	–	–	–	–	–	–	17,122
109	York East	Con	11,085	66.02%	5,379	32.04%	58.74%	11,085	–	5,706	–	–	–	–	–	–	–	–	–	–	16,791
110	York North	Lib	6,009	57.49%	1,565	14.97%	75.01%	4,444	6,009	–	–	–	–	–	–	–	–	–	–	–	10,453
111	York South	Con	10,242	66.49%	5,080	32.98%	55.36%	10,242	–	5,162	–	–	–	–	–	–	–	–	–	–	15,404
112	York West	Con	9,927	62.20%	6,813	42.69%	63.04%	9,927	2,919	3,114	–	–	–	–	–	–	–	–	–	–	15,960

Dual nominations in the 1923 election
Riding	Candidate		Votes	Placed
Port Arthur	█ Conservative	Donald McDonald Hogarth	2,683	1st
Port Arthur	█ Conservative	Francis Henry Keefer	2,511	2nd
Prescott	█ Conservative	Edmund Mooney	2,831	2nd
Prescott	█ Conservative	Louis Beaudoin	2,342	3rd
St. George	█ Independent-Conservative	Cecil Armstrong	1,664	3rd
St. George	█ Independent-Conservative	Edward Owens	717	5th

== After math ==
The members elected convened in the legislature on February 2, 1927.

After the election, the Toronto Star reported accusations of other corrupt payments during the campaign. In Kent East, the former Progressive Candidate W.J.Cryderman stated that an unnamed Liberal had offered him $500 cash plus a Dominion government position if he withdrew his nomination. The allegation was however never acted upon, and therefore never tested in court. In Perth South, the Progressive candidate W.A. McKenzie was twice offered payments by the Prohibition Union if he withdrew his nomination. He did withdraw, but returned both cheques because of their blatant illegality.

== See also ==
- Politics of Ontario
- List of Ontario political parties
- Premier of Ontario
- Leader of the Opposition (Ontario)

== Sources ==
- The Canadian Annual Review of Public Affairs, 1926–27. Toronto: The Annual Review Company. 1927.
