= Peter Duncan McCallum =

Canadian politician

Peter McCallum

Ontario MPP
- In office 1893–1898
- Preceded by: Hugh McKenzie
- Succeeded by: Henry John Pettypiece
- Constituency: Lambton East

Personal details
- Born: August 26, 1853 Erin, Canada West
- Died: October 5, 1917 (aged 64) Mount Clemens, Michigan, U.S.
- Party: Protestant Protective Association
- Spouse: Ann Christena Vivian (m. 1878)
- Occupation: Farmer

Peter Duncan McCallum (August 26, 1853 – October 5, 1917) was an Ontario farmer and political figure. He represented Lambton East in the Legislative Assembly of Ontario as a Conservative-Protestant Protective Association member from 1893 to 1898.

He was born in Erin, Canada West in 1853, the son of Peter McCallum. He served as reeve of Bosanquet Township and as warden for Lambton County. In 1878, he married Ann Christena Vivian. McCallum was first elected to the provincial assembly in an 1893 by-election held after the death of Hugh McKenzie. He served as Inspector of Liquor Licenses in East Lambton from 1906 to 1916 and then as assistant Inspector for Lambton County. He died in Michigan in 1917.
