= Greenwood (Ontario provincial electoral district) =

Former provincial electoral district in Ontario, Canada

Ontario electoral district
- Greenwood, in relation to the other Toronto ridings, after the 1926 redistribution.

Defunct provincial electoral district
- Legislature: Legislative Assembly of Ontario
- District created: 1925
- District abolished: 1933
- First contested: 1926
- Last contested: 1929

Greenwood was a provincial electoral district in Ontario, Canada, that existed from 1926 to 1934. It covered a section of the eastern city of Toronto east of Jones Avenue and west of Greenwood Avenue. The riding lasted less than ten years when the riding was dissolved and split between the neighbouring ridings of Riverdale to the west and Woodbine to the east.

== Boundaries ==
In 1926 the riding was carved out of the existing riding of Riverdale with the following boundaries. The southern boundary was Lake Ontario. Going north along the west side it formed a line following Carlaw Avenue north to the city limits. The boundary went east following the city limits until it reached Greenwood Avenue. From here it went south to Queen Street East. A short jog west to Knox Avenue which was followed south to its end. This line was extended south to the lake.

Prior to the 1934 election, the riding was dissolved and split between Woodbine to the east and Riverdale to the west.

== Members of Provincial Parliament ==
Greenwood
Assembly	Years	Member	Party
Prior to 1926 part of the Riverdale riding
17th	1926–1929	George Smith	Conservative
18th	1929–1934	George Smith	Conservative
Sourced from the Ontario Legislative Assembly
Merged into the Riverdale and the Woodbine ridings after 1934

== Election results ==
1929 Ontario general election
Party	Candidate	Votes	%	±%
Conservative	George Joseph Smith	5,783	79.04	+0.40
Liberal	Joseph C. Smith	1,534	20.96	–0.40
Total valid votes		7,317	99.38	
Total rejected ballots		46	0.62	–0.04
Turnout		7,363	35.98	–22.26
Eligible voters		20,467		
Conservative hold		Swing		+0.40
Source: Elections Ontario

1926 Ontario general election
Party	Candidate	Votes	%
Conservative	George Joseph Smith	9,101	78.64
Liberal	Thomas Rennick	2,472	21.36
Total valid votes		11,573	99.33
Total rejected ballots		78	0.67
Turnout		11,651	58.23
Eligible voters		20,007	
Conservative pickup new district.			
Source: Elections Ontario

== See also ==
- List of Ontario provincial electoral districts
- Canadian provincial electoral districts
