= Robert John McCormick =

Canadian politician

Robert McCormick

Ontario MPP
- In office 1908–1914
- Preceded by: Hugh Montgomery
- Succeeded by: John Burton Martyn
- Constituency: Lambton East

Personal details
- Born: August 10, 1848 County Armagh, Ireland
- Died: October 13, 1919 (aged 71) Watford, Ontario
- Party: Liberal
- Spouse: Elizabeth Smith (m. 1876)
- Occupation: Farmer

Robert John McCormick (August 10, 1848 – October 13, 1919) was an Ontario farmer and political figure. He represented Lambton East in the Legislative Assembly of Ontario from 1908 to 1914 as a Liberal member.

He was born in County Armagh, Ireland, the son of Joseph McCormick who was of Scottish descent, and came to Warwick Township, Canada East in 1862. He became a brick maker and bought a brickyard there in 1877. In 1876, he married Elizabeth Smith. McCormick served on the council for Warwick, was reeve from 1891 to 1894 and warden for Lambton County in 1892. He ran unsuccessfully for a seat in the provincial assembly in 1894. He was defeated by John Burton Martyn in 1914. He died 13 October 1919.
