= Hugh Montgomery (Canadian politician) =

Canadian politician

Ontario MPP
- In office 1905–1908
- Preceded by: Henry John Pettypiece
- Succeeded by: Robert John McCormick
- Constituency: Lambton East

Personal details
- Born: March 25, 1858 Plympton Township, Lambton County, Canada West
- Died: January 10, 1926 (aged 67) Ontario, Canada
- Party: Conservative
- Spouse: Effie J. Duncan (m. 1880)
- Occupation: Farmer

Hugh Montgomery (March 25, 1858 – January 10, 1926) was a Canadian farmer and political figure in Ontario. He represented Lambton East in the Legislative Assembly of Ontario from 1905 to 1908 as a Conservative member.

He was born in Plympton Township, Lambton County, Canada West, the son of Charteris Montgomery and Charlotte Brown who came to Lambton County from Ireland. He operated a threshing business and also raised horses and cattle. Montgomery married Effie J. Duncan in 1880. He served on the township council, serving as reeve from 1897 to 1903. He was defeated by Robert John McCormick in 1908 in a bid for reelection to the provincial assembly. He died January 10, 1926.
