= Charles Janes =

Canadian politician

Ontario MPP
- In office 1945–1963
- Preceded by: Robert Roy Downie
- Succeeded by: Lorne Henderson
- Constituency: Lambton East

Personal details
- Born: January 26, 1889 Watford, Ontario
- Died: June 21, 1983 (aged 95) Petrolia, Ontario
- Party: Conservative
- Spouse: Hazel Dolbear
- Occupation: Telephone company executive

Charles Eusibius Janes (January 26, 1889 – June 21, 1983) was a Canadian politician who was a Member of Provincial Parliament in Legislative Assembly of Ontario from 1945 to 1963. He represented the riding of Lambton East for the Ontario Progressive Conservative Party.

Born in Watford, Ontario, he was a telephone company executive.
