= Peter Graham (Liberal MPP) =

Canadian farmer and political figure

Ontario MPP
- In office 1875–1890
- Preceded by: New riding
- Succeeded by: Hugh McKenzie
- Constituency: Lambton East

Personal details
- Born: July 16, 1821 Kirkoswald, Cumberland, England
- Died: July 19, 1900 (aged 79) Hamilton, Ontario
- Party: Liberal
- Occupation: Farmer

Peter Graham (July 16, 1821 – July 19, 1900) was an Ontario farmer and political figure. He represented Lambton East in the Legislative Assembly of Ontario as a Liberal member from 1875 to 1890.

He was born in Kirkoswald, Cumberland, England in 1821 and came to Vaudreuil County, Lower Canada with his family in 1834. He served in the local militia during the Lower Canada Rebellion. Later, he moved to Wentworth County in Upper Canada before finally settling in Warwick Township in Lambton County. He served on the township council for Warwick, serving as reeve for several years. He was also named a justice of the peace. He supported giving the vote to women. He helped introduce the Tile Drainage Act, which helped farmers gain funding to drain wetlands on their land. In 1890, he was appointed bursar for the Hamilton Insane Asylum and served in that position until his death in 1900.

== Electoral history ==
1875 Ontario general election: Lambton East
Party	Candidate	Votes	%
Liberal	Peter Graham	1,443	53.35
Conservative	G. Shirley	1,262	46.65
Turnout		2,705	70.74
Eligible voters		3,824	
Liberal pickup new district.			
Source: Elections Ontario

1879 Ontario general election: Lambton East
Party	Candidate	Votes	%	±%
Liberal	Peter Graham	1,840	50.88	−2.46
Conservative	G. Sherley	1,776	49.12	+2.46
Total valid votes		3,616	73.23	+2.49
Eligible voters		4,938		
Liberal hold		Swing		−2.46
Source: Elections Ontario
