= Charles Oliver Fairbank (politician) =

Canadian politician (1904–1982)

Ontario MPP
- In office 1938–1943
- Preceded by: Milton Duncan McVicar
- Succeeded by: Robert Roy Downie
- Constituency: Lambton East

Personal details
- Born: June 6, 1904 Petrolia, Ontario
- Died: 1982 (aged 77–78) Petrolia, Ontario
- Party: Liberal
- Occupation: Petroleum engineer

Charles Oliver Fairbank (June 6, 1904 - 1982) was an Ontario petroleum engineer and political figure. He represented Lambton East in the Legislative Assembly of Ontario as a Liberal member from 1938 to 1943.

He was born in Petrolia, Ontario, the son of Dr. Charles Oliver Fairbank and grandson of John Henry Fairbank, and studied at McGill University and the University of California, where he received a B.Sc. Fairbank served as reeve of Petrolia. He was elected to the provincial assembly in a 1938 by-election held after the death of Milton Duncan McVicar. He retired from politics in 1943.
