= 1920 Conservative Party of Ontario leadership election =

Canadian political party leadership election

- Date: December 2, 1920
- Convention: Masonic Hall, Toronto
- Resigning leader: Sir William Hearst
- Won by: George Howard Ferguson
- Ballots: 1
- Candidates: 3

The Conservative Party of Ontario held its first ever leadership election on December 2, 1920. The event was held to select a replacement for outgoing leader and former Premier of Ontario Sir William Hearst. The party selected George Howard Ferguson, who would become premier after the Ontario general election of 1923.

- FERGUSON, Howard won on first ballot
- LAWSON, Earl
- HENRY, George

Note: The vote totals were not announced.

== See also ==
- Progressive Conservative Party of Ontario leadership conventions
