= Milton Duncan McVicar =

Canadian politician (1893–1938)

Ontario MPP
- In office 1934–1938
- Preceded by: Thomas Howard Fraleigh
- Succeeded by: Charles Oliver Fairbank
- Constituency: Lambton East

Personal details
- Born: September 18, 1893 Enniskillen, Ontario
- Died: February 3, 1938 (aged 44) Toronto, Ontario
- Party: Liberal
- Occupation: Farmer

Milton Duncan McVicar (September 18, 1893 – February 3, 1938) was a farmer and politician in Ontario, Canada. He represented Lambton East in the Legislative Assembly of Ontario from 1934 to 1938 as a Liberal.

The son of Peter McVicar and Annie Kerr, both natives of Scotland, he was born in Enniskillen, Ontario and was educated in Petrolia. McVicar was reeve for Enniskillen from 1925 to 1934, serving as warden for Lambton County in 1932. He was president of the local St. Andrew's Society and was also a Mason.

McVicar defeated Conservative incumbent Thomas Howard Fraleigh in 1934 to win a seat in the assembly; he was reelected in 1937. He died in office in 1938.
