= United Farmers of Ontario =

- Former provincial party
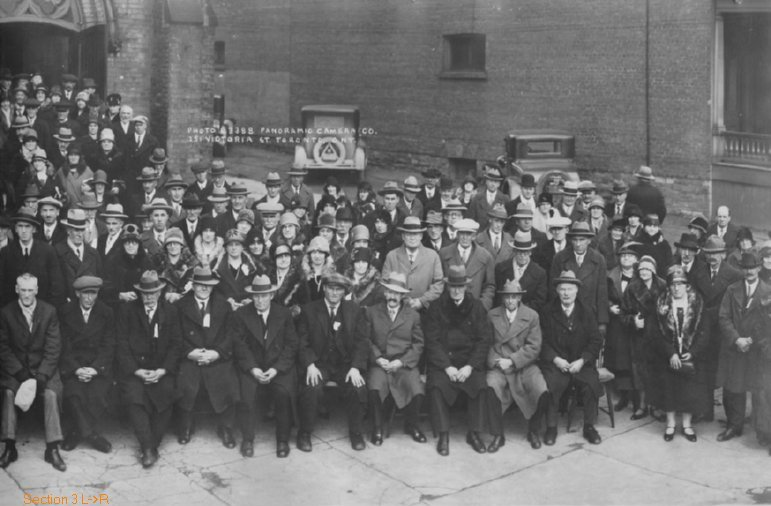
- 1928 convention
- Founded: 1914
- Dissolved: 1934 as an official party 1940 as an unofficial party 1944 as an organization
- Succeeded by: Liberal-Progressives, Ontario CCF
- Ideology: Agrarianism; Populism; Social Democracy
- Colours: Green

The United Farmers of Ontario (UFO) was an agrarian and populist provincial political party in Ontario, Canada. It was the Ontario provincial branch of the United Farmers movement of the early part of the 20th century.

== History ==
=== Foundation and rise (1914–1919) ===
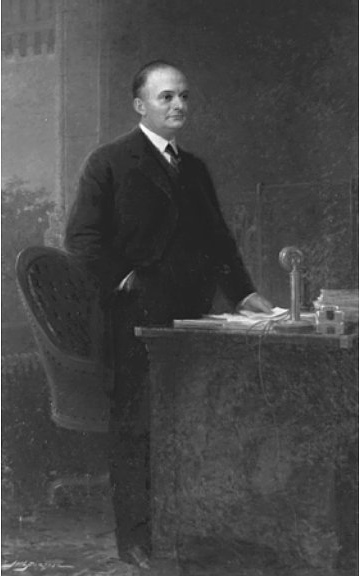
Ernest C. Drury, UFO premier and leader

The UFO was founded in 1914 by the union of various farmers' organizations that had been created over the previous fifteen years. James J. Morrison was the leading figure in the party, serving as its general secretary and secretary of the United Farmers Co-operative Company Ltd. (the purchasing co-operative the UFO operated on behalf of its members). The organization grew rapidly and by 1917 it had 350 local clubs and 12,000 members. The UFO had a comprehensive farmer's platform that called for the nationalization of railways, progressive taxation, and legislation that would facilitate the operation of co-operatives. In 1917, supporters of the UFO formed the Farmers' Publishing Company and purchased The Weekly Sun renaming it The Farmer's Sun to act as the organ of the UFO.

The UFO entered politics by contesting and winning a by-election in Manitoulin in 1918, in which Beniah Bowman was elected as the party's first Member of the Legislative Assembly (MLA). In the 1919 provincial election, with over 50,000 members, the party sought to hold the balance of power so it could introduce legislation friendly to farmers. It co-operated with the Independent Labour Party with the two organizations not running candidates against each other - the UFO contested rural ridings and the ILP stood candidates in urban areas. In total there were 64 UFO candidates, 20 ILP candidates and 10 Farmer-Labour candidates in the 1919 provincial election. The UFO platform called for the abolition of political patronage, better educational opportunities in rural areas, cheap electric power, conservation of forests, proportional representation and "direct legislation". The UFO also favoured prohibition and budgetary restraint, two platform planks that were at odds with the views of urban Labour supporters. To the shock of everyone, including itself, it won 45 seats and formed a coalition government with the support of Labour MLAs in the Legislative Assembly of Ontario despite having no leader.

As the United Farmers began as a single-issue party, Morrison opposed forming a government, believing that the party should concern itself solely with agricultural issues and that it would not be able to represent the entire province. Furthermore, he viewed the Independent Labour Party as inimical to farmers' interests and opposed a coalition with them to form a majority government. Morrison was offered the position of UFO caucus leader and Premier of Ontario following the election but declined as did Sir Adam Beck; the position instead went Ernest C. Drury.

=== Government of Ontario (1919–1923) ===
Despite Morrison's objections, the UFO joined with other MLAs to form a coalition government. He had the UFO join with 10 Independent Labour Party MLAs (an 11th ILP MLA, Morrison MacBride, broke with his colleagues and sat in Opposition). Three Independent MLAs also joined the coalition government. Drury was Premier and two of the ILP MLAs were in the cabinet.

The government under Drury tried to be a "people's government" rather than a "class government." Drury himself called for the coalition government to be termed a "People's Party."

Drury's Farmer-Labour government created the first Department of Welfare for the province and brought in allowances for widows and children, a minimum wage for women and standardized adoption procedures. His government also expanded Ontario Hydro and promoted rural electrification. It created the Province of Ontario Savings Office - a provincially owned bank that lent money to farmers at a lower rate, along the lines of "Social credit".

It began the first major reforestation program in North America, and began construction of the modern highway system. The government was also a strict enforcer of temperance measures, Prohibition being law in Ontario from 1916 to 1927. Drury also arranged for a grant for then-unknown researchers Frederick Banting and Charles Best who, with Dr. James Collip, later discovered insulin.

The UFO grew quickly to 1,500 clubs and 60,000 members by 1920.

Drury argued for a "broadening out" of the party to include labour and others, but in so doing, alienated some hard-line Farmers. Morrison, the general secretary of the UFO, remained outside of the legislature and government. Morrison opposed a number of the coalition's initiatives, perceiving the UFO's actions as a broad-based Progressive government rather than a "class-based" United Farmer government and believed that the party should not be in government but should hold the balance of power in order to force the government of the day to pass pro-farmer legislation.

The UFO government clashed with the UFO organization (led by James J. Morrison), which eventually withdrew its support from the government. However, when the 1923 election came around, the UFO received 200,000 votes, down by 50,000 compared to the previous election. This was actually a higher percentage of votes cast than it had taken in 1919 as the 1923 election suffered from low turn-out.

By the time another election came around, in 1923, the economy had improved, in part due to the government's decisions. The Drury government lost most of their seats in the election of 1923. Seventeen United Farmer and four Labour members returned to the Legislature, compared to 75 Conservatives. Drury lost his own seat.

=== Decline (1923–1929) ===
Harry Nixon, the last leader of the Progressives.

Though the United Farmers of Ontario remained the second largest party in the legislature, they were denied Official Opposition status by Conservative premier Howard Ferguson. The position was instead given to the Liberals with W.E.N. Sinclair as Leader of the Opposition, despite the party having three fewer seats than the UFO. Morrison had announced that the UFO would be withdrawing from politics, which Ferguson had used as justification for the move. Manning Doherty, interim leader of the UFO caucus, could do nothing aside from win a ruling from the Speaker that, as leader of a caucus of more than 15 MLAs, he was entitled to an extra salary.

Eighteen months following the general election, William Raney was elected unanimously by his caucus as leader of what was now referred to as the "Progressive" bloc of MLAs which had begun as Farmer and Labour MLAs. Leslie Oke and Beniah Bowman refused to accept the leadership of Raney, a non-farmer, and also disagreed with the creation of a "Progressive Party" which would include non-farmers - with the support of The Farmer's Sun, they insisted on continuing to sit as UFO members rather than with the Progressive group. Bowman resigned from the legislature in 1926 in order to enter federal politics.

The issue which dominated Ontario politics in the mid-1920s was the Ferguson government's proposal to repeal the Ontario Temperance Act and replace prohibition with government control of liquor. The Liberals were split on the issue - most of their MLAs were "dry" but some were "wets" who were opposed to prohibition. The Progressives under Raney, however, were adamantly in favour of prohibition and opposed to Ferguson's proposals. This led to an estrangement with Labour MLA Karl Homuth who supported Ferguson's proposals and would eventually join the Conservatives.

The 1926 provincial election reduced the farmer-labour contingent to thirteen Progressive MLAs and one Labour MLA (Homuth - who had broken with the Progressives and supported the government) while two new UFO MLAs, Thomas Farquhar and Farquhar Oliver, joined Oke's faction. Several weeks after the election the UFO convention voted to cease running its own candidates, though a handful of local UFO clubs continued to nominate candidates for some years.

=== End of the movement (1927–1940) ===
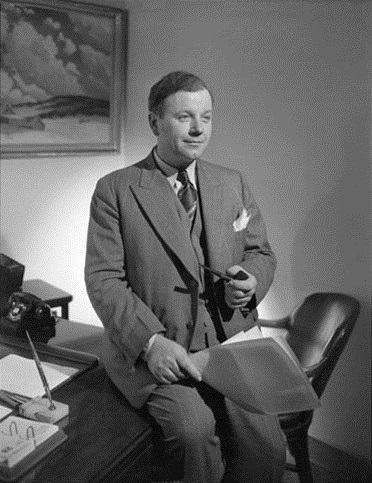
Farquhar Oliver, last UFO MLA in the provincial legislature.

Raney resigned from the legislature the next year in order to accept an appointment to the Supreme Court of Ontario and 72-year-old John Giles Lethbridge was chosen as the new leader of the Progressives. In the 1929 election, only five Progressives, one Labour and one UFO MLA won re-election. Lethbridge, like Raney in the previous election, campaigned largely on the issue of prohibition. After Lethbridge lost his seat in the 1929 election Harry Nixon, who had served as Provincial Secretary in Drury's government, became the leader of the remaining Progressives. In the early 1930s, Nixon and the Progressives agreed to an alliance with former UFO activist Mitchell Hepburn who, in 1930, became leader of the Liberal Party. A group of four Liberal-Progressive MLAs, led by Nixon, were elected in the 1934 election, who joined Hepburn to form a government and were eventually absorbed into the Liberal Party. (see Liberal-Progressives (Ontario) for more information)

In 1932, leading UFO member Agnes Macphail (originally elected to the Progressive Party) encouraged the UFO to affiliate with Co-operative Commonwealth Federation (CCF) when it was formed. It did so, and MacPhail became the first Chairman of the Ontario CCF in 1932, but the UFO disaffiliated from the CCF in 1934 due to allegations of communist influence in the party. The UFO nominated candidates, incumbent MLA Farquhar Oliver and former MLA Leslie Oke, accordingly ran as UFO candidates in the 1934 provincial election rather than as CCFers. The UFO, like United Farmers groups in the provinces of western Canada, decided to withdraw entirely from electoral politics though Oliver and Macphail continued to run under the UFO banner until 1940. Many United Farmers joined the CCF as individuals. The UFO's newspaper, The Farmer's Sun, was sold to Graham Spry and Alan Plaunt and became an organ for the League for Social Reconstruction and the Ontario CCF.

In the 1935 federal election, the UFO's provincial executive voted to endorse the new Reconstruction Party of Canada formed by H.H. Stevens; however, many local UFO groups backed the Co-operative Commonwealth Federation and UFO MP Agnes MacPhail continued to work with the CCF on an informal basis. Other UFOers backed the Liberals. The Reconstruction Party won 11% of the vote in Ontario in the 1935 federal election, more than the CCF, but failed to win a seat in the province and only won one seat nationally.

In 1936, the UFO, the United Farmers’ Co-operative Ltd., and various growers and other agricultural organizations formed the Ontario Chamber of Agriculture which, in 1940, became the Ontario Federation of Agriculture (OFA), a non-partisan lobbying and marketing organization for farmers. In 1943, the UFO ceased to exist as a formal organization and its remnants were absorbed by the OFA. In 1948 the United Farmers' Co-operative became the United Co-operatives of Ontario and remains one of the largest farmer-owned co-operatives in Canada.

In 1940, Oliver, the last remaining UFO member of the Legislature and a supporter of the Hepburn government since 1934, joined the Hepburn cabinet and became a Liberal. MacPhail lost her seat as the last United Farmers MP in the House of Commons in the 1940 election. She turned to provincial politics and won election to the Ontario Legislature as a candidate of the CCF in the 1943 provincial election while Oliver became Liberal Party leader in 1945.

== United Farmers Co-operative Company Grocers ==
Around 1919, the UFO hired Theodore Loblaw to help launch a chain of cooperative grocery stores. However, the attempt failed, and Loblaw left to start his own grocery chain.

== UFO/Progressive leaders ==
1. E.C. Drury, 1919–1924
2. Manning Doherty, 1924–1925
3. William Edgar Raney, 1925–1927^{+}
4. John Giles Lethbridge, 1927–1929
5. Harry Nixon, 1929–1934

^{+}Leslie Warner Oke led a UFO rump of three MLAs from 1926 until 1929.

== UFO Secretaries ==
1. J.J. Morrison, 1914–1933
2. H.H. Hannam, 1933–1942

== Election results ==
=== UFO ===
Election	Leader	Seats	Change +/-	Votes	%	Standing	Status
1919	Ernest C. Drury	44 / 111	▲44	248,274	21.0%	▲1st	Coalition Government
1923	Ernest C. Drury	17 / 111	▼27	199,393	21.0%	▼2nd	Second Party
1926	Leslie Oke	3 / 112	▼14	15,417	1.3%	▼4th	Fourth Party
1929	Leslie Oke	1 / 112	▼2	15,417	1.3%	4th	Fourth Party
1934	Farquhar Oliver	1 / 90	Steady	8,648	0.6%	4th	Fourth Party
1937	Farquhar Oliver	1 / 90	Steady	7,296	0.5%	4th	Fourth Party

=== Progressives ===
Election	Leader	Seats	Change +/-	Votes	%	Status
1926	William Raney	10 / 112	▼7 (from 1923 UFO result)	72,277	6.3%	Third Party
1929	John Giles Lethbridge	4 / 112	▼6	30,795	3.4%	Third Party

== See also ==
- List of United Farmers/Labour MLAs in the Ontario legislature
- James J. Morrison#Collapse of Drury government
- E.C. Drury#Opposition of J.J.Morrison and other controversies
- William Raney#Embarrassments surrounding activities of The Reverend J O L Spracklin
- J O L Spracklin#Prohibition controversies and events of 1920
- Progressive Party
- List of Progressive/United Farmer MPs
- Cooperative Commonwealth Federation
- Co-operative Commonwealth Federation (Ontario Section)
- Labour Party
- United Farmers (disambiguation)
- United Farmers of Alberta
- List of Ontario political parties
- List of Ontario general elections
