= 2010 Thunder Bay District municipal elections =

Elections were held in the organized municipalities in the Thunder Bay District of Ontario on October 25, 2010 in conjunction with municipal elections across the province.

== Conmee ==
Kevin Holland was acclaimed as reeve of Conmee, and Mary-Lynne Hunt, Grant Arnold, Robert Rydholm and Robert McMaster were elected to council.

Reeve Candidate	Vote	%
Kevin Holland	Acclaimed	

== Dorion ==
No council elections were held in Dorion, as the entire council won by acclamation. Dave Harris will serve as reeve; Ed Chambers, Don Modin, Diane Poulin and Kitty Dumonski will serve on council.

Reeve Candidate	Vote	%
Dave Harris (X)	Acclaimed	

== Gillies ==
No council elections were held in Gillies, as the entire council won by acclamation. Rick Kieri will serve as reeve; Rudy Buitenhuis, William Groenheide, Henry Jantunen and Linda Turk will serve on council.

Reeve Candidate	Vote	%
Rick Kieri (X)	Acclaimed	

== Greenstone ==
Renald Beaulieu won the mayoralty of Greenstone, and Chris Walterson, William Assad, Mary Moylan, Jane Jantunen, Ronald Melhuish, Kevin Melanson, Jay Daiter and Armand Giguère were elected to council.

Mayoral Candidate	Vote	%
Renald Beaulieu	1,412	58.18
Elaine Mannisto	797	32.84
Mike Malouf	218	8.98

== Manitouwadge ==
Incumbent mayor John MacEachern was re-elected in Manitouwadge; Sheldon Plummer, Connie Hunter, Donna Jaunzarins and Natalie Labbee were elected to council.

Mayoral Candidate	Vote	%
John MacEachern (X)	445	50.80
Gordon MacDonald	291	33.22
Dave Wheadon	84	9.59
Michel Villeneuve	56	6.39

== Marathon ==
No council elections were held in Marathon, as the entire council won by acclamation. Rick Dumas will serve as mayor; Terry Fox, Ray Lake, Roger Souckey and Kelly Tsubouchi will serve on council.

Mayoral Candidate	Vote	%
Rick Dumas (X)	Acclaimed	

== Neebing ==
Ziggy Polkowski defeated incumbent mayor Steven Harasen in Neebing; Dawne Kilgour, Roger Shott, Bev Dale, Curtis Coulson, Bill Lankinen and Michael McCooeye were elected to council.

Mayoral Candidate	Vote	%
Ziggy Polkowski	392	34.39
Beverly Mercer	360	31.58
Steven Harasen (X)	210	18.42
John B. Livingston	178	15.61

== Nipigon ==
Incumbent mayor Richard Harvey was acclaimed back into office in Nipigon; James Foulds, Gordon MacKenzie, Levina Collins and Louise Dupuis were elected to council.

Mayoral Candidate	Vote	%
Richard Harvey (X)	Acclaimed	

== O'Connor ==
Incumbent mayor Ron Nelson was acclaimed back into office in O'Connor; Kevin Foekens, Gwen Garbutt, Bishop Racicot and Jim Vezina were elected to council.

Mayoral Candidate	Vote	%
Ron Nelson (X)	Acclaimed	

== Oliver Paipoonge ==
Incumbent mayor Lucia Kloosterhuis won re-election in Oliver Paipoonge. Bernie Kamphof, Allan Vis, Jim Byers and Eric Collingwood were elected to council.

Mayoral Candidate	Vote	%
Lucia Kloosterhuis (X)	1,142	68.84
John Graveson	517	31.16

== Red Rock ==
Incumbent mayor Gary Nelson was re-elected in Red Rock. Steven Carruthers, Darquise Robinson, Judith Sobush and Sara Park were elected to council.

Mayoral Candidate	Vote	%
Gary Nelson (X)	Acclaimed	

== Schreiber ==
Don McArthur was acclaimed mayor of Schreiber. Mark Figliomeni, Bob Krause, Lorraine Huard and Pat Halonen were elected to council.

Mayoral Candidate	Vote	%
Don McArthur	Acclaimed	

== Shuniah ==
Incumbent reeve Maria Harding was re-elected in Shuniah. Ron Giardetti, Donna Blunt, Ab Covello and Alana Bishop were elected to council.

Reeve Candidate	Vote	%
Maria Harding (X)	891	56.68
Peter J. Tighe	681	43.32

== Terrace Bay ==
There were no council elections in Terrace Bay, as incumbent mayor Michael King and councillors George Davis, Gino Leblanc, Jamie Robinson and Rick St. Louis were all acclaimed back into office.

Mayoral Candidate	Vote	%
Michael King (X)	Acclaimed	

== Thunder Bay ==
Keith Hobbs defeated incumbent mayor Lynn Peterson in Thunder Bay.

Mayoral Candidate	Vote	%
Keith Hobbs	17,517	46.04
Lynn Peterson (X)	11,460	30.12
Frank Pullia	6,424	16.88
Jeff Irwin	2,317	6.09
Colin Burridge	192	0.50
Brian Kwasny	133	0.34

Voters are asked to elect a mayor, five at-large city councillors and seven ward councillors. Unofficially, of 80,796 registered voters, 38,327 votes were cast. Voter turnout was 47.43%, a significant increase over the 38.19% turnout of the 2006 election.

=== Councillors at-large ===
Five councillors are elected at-large to sit on City Council. Nineteen people ran for the position in 2010. Each registered voter can choose up to five candidates. Incumbents Larry Hebert, Iain Angus, Rebecca Johnson, and Aldo Ruberto were re-elected, with former mayor Ken Boshcoff replacing Frank Pullia, who ran for mayor. Both Boshcoff and Hebert gained more votes than the mayor.

Candidate	Vote	%
Ken Boshcoff	22,516	14.62
Larry Hebert (X)	18,477	11.99
Iain Angus (X)	15,744	10.24
Rebecca Johnson (X)	14,201	9.22
Aldo Ruberto (X)	13,396	8.70
Lawrence Timko	12,650	8.21
Norm Staal	11,088	7.20
Gerald Graham	7,744	5.02
Beatrice Metzler	7,603	4.93
Dick Waddington	6,113	3.97
Darren Roberts	4,660	3.02
Cindy Crowe	3,706	2.40
Sharon Ostberg	3,631	2.35
House Richard Moorey	3,238	2.10
Norman Sponchia	3,082	2.00
Tyler Woods	2,967	1.92
Sydney Pettit	1,256	0.81
Iqbal Khan	1,225	0.79
Marvin Robert McMenemy	650	0.42
Total	153,977	

=== Ward councillors ===
Map of Thunder Bay's seven municipal wards

The city of Thunder Bay is divided into seven electoral wards: Current River, McIntyre, McKellar, Neebing, Northwood, Red River, and Westfort. Residents of each ward elect one member to represent their ward on city council. Twenty-five people ran for these positions. All six incumbent ward councillors were re-elected. The incumbent councillor for McKellar did not seek re-election.

==== Current River ====
Candidate	Vote	%
Andrew Foulds (X)	3,758	77.82
Andy Wolff	1,071	22.17
Total	4,829	

==== McIntyre ====
Candidate	Vote	%
Trevor Giertuga (X)	2,079	35.99
Christopher Watkins	1,326	22.95
Trudy Tuchenhagen	904	15.65
Terrence A. Yahn	823	14.24
Michael Komar	644	11.14
Total	5,766	

==== McKellar ====
Candidate	Vote	%
Paul Pugh	2,835	65.24
David Nicholson	1,006	23.15
Robin Rickards	504	11.59
Total	4,345	

==== Neebing ====
Candidate	Vote	%
Linda Rydholm (X)	1,840	50.02
Bill Scollie	1130	30.72
Don Sinclair	448	12.18
Henry Wojak	154	4.18
Gary Shchepanik	106	2.88
Total	3,678	

==== Northwood ====
Candidate	Vote	%
Mark Bentz (X)	2,305	42.00
David Polhill	2,162	39.40
Frank Armiento	1,020	18.58
Total	5,487	

==== Red River ====
Candidate	Vote	%
Brian McKinnon (X)	2,988	44.57
Paul Wolfe	2,108	31.44
Jay Stapleton	1,050	15.66
Laury Alexander	558	8.32
Total	6,704	

==== Westfort ====
Candidate	Vote	%
Joe Virdiramo (X)	3,091	55.31
John Radl	1,617	28.93
Jeffrey John Polhill	880	15.74
Total	5,588	
