= 2026 Thunder Bay District municipal elections =

Ontario, Canada municipal election

2026 Thunder Bay District municipal election
- October 26, 2026

Elections will be held in the organized municipalities in the Thunder Bay District of Ontario on October 26, 2026, in conjunction with municipal elections across the province.

The following are the results of the mayoral and reeve races in each municipality and the council races in the City of Thunder Bay.

== Conmee ==
=== Mayor ===
List of candidates:

Mayoral Candidate	Vote	%
Sheila Maxwell (X)	99	36.5%
Crystal Olson	78	28.8%
David Halvorsen	70	25.8%
Tara Wupori	24	8.9%

=== Town Council (4 to be elected) ===
Candidate	Vote	%
David Macsemchuk	146	
Darren Smith	129	
Jennifer Hainrich	123	
Jason Fleck	120	
David Maxwell (X)	112	
Trinity Hebert	100	
Robert Pajamaki	97	
Jamie Barrie	84	

== Dorion ==
=== Reeve ===
Reeve Candidate	Vote	%
Robert Beatty (X)	Acclaimed	

=== Town Council (4 to be elected) ===
Candidate	Vote	%
Brent Cadeau (X)	Acclaimed	
Ross De Jardine	Acclaimed	
Jeffrey Mehagan (X)	Acclaimed	
Darren Penner (X)	Acclaimed	

== Gillies ==
=== Reeve ===
Reeve Candidate	Vote	%
Deborah Lynne Poole-Hofmann	115	61.2%
Andrew Turk	63	33.5%
Wendy Wright (X)	10	5.3%

=== Town Council (4 to be elected) ===
Candidate	Vote	%
Rox-Ann Moore	129	
Clay McKibbon	115	
Sheryl (Sherri) Halverson	111	
Linda Potter	81	
Rudy Buitenhuis (X)	80	
James Davis	79	
Bernard Dowson	61	

== Greenstone ==
=== Mayor ===
Mayor James McPherson is running for re-election. He is being challenged by nutrition and wellness businesswoman Patti David-Myros, executive director of the Thunderbird Friendship Centre Karen Stephenson, and Geraldton ward resident John Spridgeon.

List of candidates:

Mayoral Candidate	Vote	%
James McPherson (X)	718	42.8%
John Spridgeon	550	32.8%
Karen Stephenson	346	20.6%
Patti David-Myros	65	3.9%

=== Municipal Council ===
Candidate	Vote	%
Beardmore Ward (1 to be elected)
Nikki Goodman	Acclaimed	
Geraldton Ward (2 to be elected)
Margie Abraham-Rondeau	429	
Penny Trottier	425	
Eric K. Pietsch (X)	415	
Chris Walterson (X)	144	
Michelle Bernier	99	
Longlac Ward (2 to be elected)
Tim Griffin	373	
Amanda Cargnelutti	279	
Elaine Mannisto (X)	162	
Ronald Tripple	40	
Nakina Ward (1 to be elected)
Theresa Stangway	116	64.4%
Kyle Polesky	64	35.6%
Rural East Ward (1 to be elected)
Paulette Abraham	68	73.9%
Carole Camiré	24	26.1%
Rural West Ward (1 to be elected)
Fran Koning (X)	45	44.1%
Ron Melhuish	34	33.3%
Wade Clarke	23	22.6%

== Manitouwadge ==
=== Mayor ===
List of candidates:

Mayoral Candidate	Vote	%
Jim Moffat (X)	558	56.6%
Joe North	259	26.3%
David LaVoie	169	17.1%

== Marathon ==
=== Mayor ===
Mayor Rick Dumas is being challenged by retired deputy clerk Louise Hamilton.

List of candidates:

Mayoral Candidate	Vote	%
Rick Dumas (X)	852	
Louise Hamilton	723	

== Neebing ==
=== Mayor ===
List of candidates:

Mayoral Candidate	Vote	%
Joey Busch	233	
Obie Egbuchulam	186	
Florence Maclean	321	
Ziggy Polkowski	215	
Brian Wright	170	

== Nipigon ==
=== Mayor ===
List of candidates:

Mayoral Candidate	Vote	%
Suzanne Kukko (X)	202	
Matthew Dupuis	586	

== O'Connor ==
=== Mayor ===
List of candidates:

Mayoral Candidate	Vote	%
Jim Vezina (X)	Acclaimed	

== Oliver Paipoonge ==
=== Mayor ===
Mayor Lucy Kloosterhuis is not running for re-election. Running to replace her is councillor Bernie Kamphof and former councillor Rick Potter.

List of candidates:

Mayoral Candidate	Vote	%
Bernie Kamphof		
Rick Potter		

== Red Rock ==
=== Mayor ===
List of candidates:

Mayoral Candidate	Vote	%
Darquise Robinson (X)	Acclaimed	

== Schreiber ==
=== Mayor ===
List of candidates:

Mayoral Candidate	Vote	%
Christopher Labbe		
Robert Fisk		
Adam Cherry		
Anne-Marie Bourgeault		

== Shuniah ==
=== Mayor ===
Mayor Wendy Landry was re-elected by acclamation.

List of candidates:

Mayoral Candidate	Vote	%
Wendy Landry (X)	Acclaimed	

== Terrace Bay ==
=== Mayor ===
List of candidates:

Mayoral Candidate	Vote	%
Paul Malashewski (X)	281	
Richard St. Louis	231	
Aaron Fewkes	195	

== Thunder Bay ==
The following were the candidates for mayor and city council of Thunder Bay.

=== Mayor ===
2026 Thunder Bay Mayoral election
- October 26, 2026
- Turnout: 40.85%
Candidate	Moe Comuzzi	Aldo Ruberto	Trevor Giertuga
Popular vote	8,888	7,942	7,106
Percentage	23.93%	21.38%	19.13%
Candidate	Volker Kromm	Peter Diedrich
Popular vote	6,145	3,780
Percentage	16.54%	10.18%
Mayor before election
Ken Boshcoff
Elected mayor
Moe Comuzzi

Mayor Ken Boshcoff announced in September 2025 that he was not planning on running for re-election. Running to replace him were city at-large city councillor Trevor Giertuga, two-time federal Conservative and one-time provincial Progressive Conservative candidate Moe Comuzzi, former executive director of the Regional Food Distribution Association, Volker Kromm, former Tbaytel CEO Peter Diedrich, former At-large city councillor Aldo Ruberto, and Underground Gym founder Peter Panetta. Former CBC reporter Shane Judge initially announced his candidacy, but ended his run in September 2026.

Mayoral Candidate	Vote	%
Moe Comuzzi	8,888	23.93
Aldo Ruberto	7,942	21.38
Trevor Giertuga	7,106	19.13
Volker Kromm	6,145	16.54
Peter Mark John Diedrich	3,780	10.18
Doug Vincent	1,197	3.22
Peter Panetta	888	2.39
Shane Judge	489	1.32
Wolfgang Schoor	428	1.15
Donald Baxter	283	0.76

=== City Council ===
Map of Thunder Bay's wards

Wards (1 to be elected)
Candidate	Vote	%
Current River
Andrew Foulds (X)	3,054	66.18
Stéphane Léonard Kuziora	1,561	33.82
McIntyre
Alberto Aiello (X)	3,816	60.43
Brian Phillips	2,499	39.57
McKellar
Brian Hamilton (X)	2,199	48.18
Tony DiPaolo	851	18.65
Tracey MacKinnon	553	12.12
Donna Lee Morettin	550	12.05
Marco Cupelli	411	9.01
Neebing
Greg Johnsen (X)	2,744	73.13
John Warren Beals	1,008	26.87
Northwood
John Ongaro	2,087	45.34
André Gagné	1,657	36.00
Syed Kabir	859	18.66
Red River
Jamie Scrimger	2,275	33.80
Michael Giardetti	1,985	29.49
Dino Cicchitano	1,051	15.61
John Murray	855	12.70
Cory Bagdon	565	8.39
Westfort
Stephen Margarit	2,978	59.26
Clinton Harris	1,254	24.96
Angel Gamble	793	15.78

At Large (5 to be elected)
Candidate	Vote	%
Mark Bentz (X)	20,331	14.89
Peng You	19,190	14.06
Kasey Taylor Etreni (X)	17,252	12.64
Julie Colquhoun	12,069	8.84
Jamie Nichols	11,767	8.62
Rajni Agarwal (X)	10,728	7.86
Gary Christian	8,823	6.46
Robert Trevisan	8,008	5.87
Stephanie Danylko	7,619	5.58
Dino Menei	6,629	4.86
Tyler Goode	6,156	4.51
Heather K. Dahlstrom	3,752	2.75
Patrick George Cully	2,097	1.54
Gene Capar	2,090	1.53

Incumbents not running for re-election

Position	Incumbent	Time in Office and Terms	
Mayor	Ken Boshcoff	2022 - 2026	1
Councillor at Large	Shelby Ch'ng	2022 - 2026	1
Westfort Councillor	Kristen Oliver	2018 - 2026	2
Northwood Councillor	Dominic Pasqualino	2022 - 2026	1
Red River Councillor	Michael Zussino	2022 - 2026	1
