= Thunder Bay City Council =

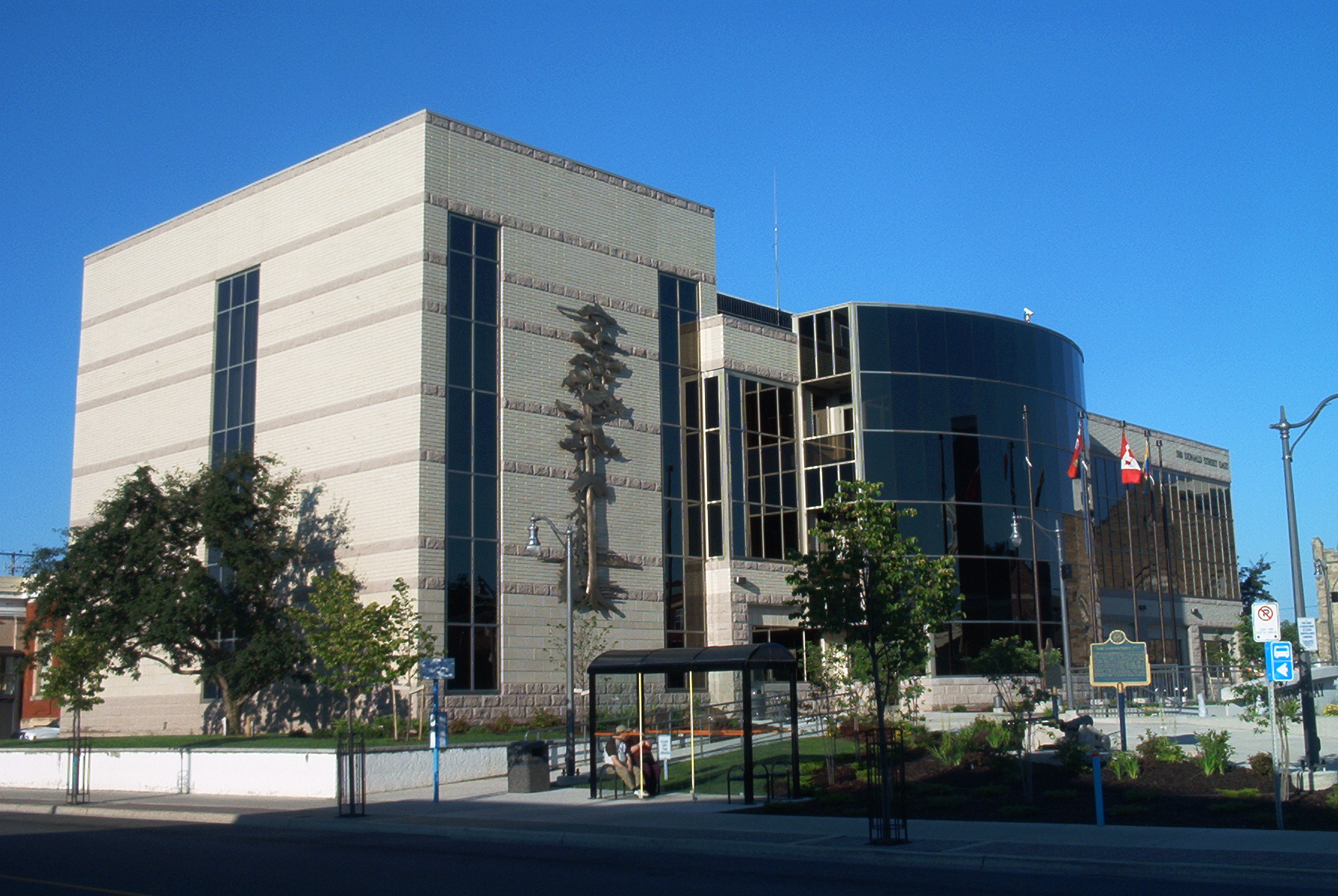
- Thunder Bay City Hall after renovations in 2009

- Wards of Thunder Bay

Type
- Type: City Council
- Term limits: none

History
- Founded: 1970
- New session started: November 15, 2022

Leadership
- Mayor of Thunder Bay: Ken Boshcoff

Structure
- Seats: 13: 7 ward councillors and 5 at-large councillors, plus Mayor
- Length of term: 4 years

Elections
- Last election: October 24, 2022
- Next election: October 26, 2026

Meeting place
- S. H. Blake Memorial Auditorium, Thunder Bay City Hall

Website
- www.thunderbay.ca/en/city-hall/city-council-thunder-bay.aspx

Thunder Bay City Council is the governing body of the city of Thunder Bay, Ontario, Canada. It consists of a mayor and twelve councillors. The mayor and five of the councillors are elected at large, with one councillor being elected for each of the city's seven wards: Current River, McIntyre, McKellar, Neebing, Northwood, Red River, and Westfort. Council members are elected to four year terms. The last election was held on October 24, 2022.

Thunder Bay City Council meets at 6:30 PM on Tuesday evenings at Thunder Bay City Hall, located at 500 Donald Street East in the downtown core of the former city of Fort William.

== Thunder Bay City Councils, 2006 - Present ==
Thunder Bay City Councillors
Council	Election	Mayor	At-Large					Current River Ward	Red River Ward	McKellar Ward	Westfort Ward	Northwood Ward	McIntyre Ward	Neebing Ward
2026-2030	2026	Moe Comuzzi	Peng You	Mark Bentz	Julie Colquhoun	Jamie Nichols	Kasey (Taylor) Etreni	Andrew Foulds	Jamie Scrimger	Brian Hamilton	Stephen Margarit	John Ongaro	Albert Aiello	Greg Johnson
2022-2026	2022	Ken Boshcoff	Shelby Ch'ng	Mark Bentz	Rajni Agarwal	Trevor Giertuga	Kasey (Taylor) Etreni	Andrew Foulds	Michael Zussino	Brian Hamilton	Kristen Oliver	Dominic Pasqualino	Albert Aiello	Greg Johnson
2018–2022	2018	Bill Mauro	Peng You	Mark Bentz	Rebecca Johnson	Trevor Giertuga	Aldo Ruberto	Andrew Foulds	Brian McKinnon	Brian Hamilton	Kristen Oliver	Shelby Ch'ng	Albert Aiello	Cody Fraser
2014–2018	2014	Keith Hobbs	Iain Angus	Larry Hebert	Rebecca Johnson	Frank Pullia	Aldo Ruberto	Andrew Foulds	Brian McKinnon	Paul Pugh	Joe Virdiramo	Shelby Ch'ng	Trevor Giertuga	Linda Rydholm
2010–2014	2010	Keith Hobbs	Iain Angus	Larry Hebert	Rebecca Johnson	Ken Boshcoff	Aldo Ruberto	Andrew Foulds	Brian McKinnon	Paul Pugh	Joe Virdiramo	Mark Bentz	Trevor Giertuga	Linda Rydholm
2006-2010	2006	Lynn Peterson	Iain Angus	Larry Hebert	Rebecca Johnson	Frank Pullia	Aldo Ruberto	Andrew Foulds	Brian McKinnon	Robert Tuchenhagen	Joe Virdiramo	Mark Bentz	Trevor Giertuga	Linda Rydholm
