= Dan McIvor =

Dan McIvor may refer to:

- Dan McIvor (aviator) (1911–2005), Canadian aviator
- Dan McIvor (politician) (1871–1965), Canadian Member of Parliament for Fort William, 1935–1958
