= 2022 Thunder Bay District municipal elections =

2022 Thunder Bay District municipal election
- October 24, 2022

Elections were held in the organized municipalities in the Thunder Bay District of Ontario on October 24, 2022, in conjunction with municipal elections across the province.

The following are the results of the mayoral and council races in each municipality.

== Conmee ==
=== Mayor ===
Mayoral Candidate	Vote	%
Sheila Maxwell	156	71.56
Suzanne Huot	62	28.44

=== Town Council (4 to be elected) ===
Candidate	Vote	%
Grant Arnold (X)	166	
David Maxwell	146	
Chris Kresack	129	
David Halvorsen	121	
Ellen Davis	121	
Gayle Manns	76	

== Dorion ==
=== Reeve ===
Reeve Candidate	Vote	%
Robert Beatty (X)	Acclaimed	

=== Town Council (4 to be elected) ===
Candidate	Vote	%
Brent Cadeau	Acclaimed	
Deborah Harris Shallow (X)	Acclaimed	
Jeffrey Mehagan (X)	Acclaimed	
Darren Penner	Acclaimed	

== Gillies ==
=== Reeve ===
Reeve Candidate	Vote	%
Wendy Wright (X)	Acclaimed	

=== Town Council (4 to be elected) ===
Candidate	Vote	%
Daniel Vanlenthe	90	
Elizabeth Jones	88	
Rudy Buitenhuis (X)	85	
William Groenheide (X)	81	
Dino DeBenetti	29	

== Greenstone ==
The following were the results for mayor and council of Greenstone.

=== Mayor ===
Incumbent Renald Beaulieu did not run for re-election. Longlac Ward councillor James McPherson was elected mayor by acclamation.

Mayoral Candidate	Vote	%
James McPherson	Acclaimed	

=== Municipal Council ===
Candidate	Vote	%
Beardmore Ward (1 to be elected)
Claudette Trottier (X)	Acclaimed	
Geraldton Ward (2 to be elected)
Eric K. Pietsch	Acclaimed	
Chris Walterson (X)	Acclaimed	
Longlac Ward (2 to be elected)
Alan Ouellet	227	42.6%
Elaine Mannisto (X)	222	41.7%
David Malouf	79	14.8%
Nakina Ward (1 to be elected)
Matthew Donovan (X)	Acclaimed	
Rural East Ward (1 to be elected)
Vicky Budge	51	62.2%
Gloria McCraw (X)	31	37.8%
Rural West Ward (1 to be elected)
Fran Koning	65	61.3%
Chantal Olson	35	33.0%
Andre Blanchard (X)	6	5.7%

== Manitouwadge ==
The following were the results for mayor of Manitouwadge.

=== Mayor ===
Mayoral Candidate	Vote	%
Jim Moffat	576	69.23
Margaret Hartling	138	16.59
John MacEachern (X)	118	14.18

=== Town Council (4 to be elected) ===
Candidate	Vote	%
Kathy Hudson (X)	588	18.94
Michael Scapinello (X)	521	16.78
Coady Keough	496	15.98
Braden Kotyk	409	13.18
Vital Morin	357	11.50
Denis Narbonne	180	5.80
Carol Barnes	172	5.54
Tracy Lee Hare	131	4.22
David Wheadon	128	4.12
Ed Dunnill	109	3.51

== Marathon ==
=== Mayor ===
Rick Dumas was re-elected by acclamation to a third term as mayor of Marathon.

Mayoral Candidate	Vote	%
Rick Dumas (X)	Acclaimed	

=== Town Council (4 to be elected) ===
Candidate	Vote	%
Darlene Cross	276	
Raymond Lake (X)	646	
Zackary Souckey (X)	878	
Kelly Tsubouchi (X)	430	
Gregory Vallance (X)	713	
Joel Shier	136	
Todd Wheeler	452	
Dawna Harrison	410	

Total Electors was 1044, with their choice of four candidates.

== Neebing ==
The following were the results for mayor and council of Neebing.

=== Mayor ===
Mayoral Candidate	Vote	%
Mark Thibert	437	62.70
Ziggy Polkowski	260	37.30

=== Municipal Council ===
Candidate	Vote	%
Ward 1 - Blake
Katherine Hill		
Gary Shchepanik		
Ron Woit		
Ward 2 - Crooks
Obie Egbuchulam		
Brian Wright (X)		
Ward 3 - Pardee
Curtis Coulson (X)	Acclaimed	
Ward 4 - Pearson
Gary Gardner (X)	Acclaimed	
Ward 5 - Scoble
Brian Kurrika (X)	Acclaimed	
Councillor at Large
Jill Cadieux		
Gordon Cuthbertson (X)		

== Nipigon ==
The following were the results for mayor of Nipigon.

=== Mayor ===
Mayoral Candidate	Vote	%
Suzanne Kukko	415	62.59
James Foulds	248	37.41

=== Town Council (4 to be elected) ===
Candidate	Vote	%
Glenn Hart		
Richard Harvey		
Barry Laukkanen		
Gordon MacKenzie		
Pierre Pelletier		
Kathrine Sakamoto		
John (Zeke) Zechner Jr. (X)		

== O'Connor ==
=== Mayor ===
Mayoral Candidate	Vote	%
Jim Vezina (X)	Acclaimed	

=== Town Council (4 to be elected) ===
Candidate	Vote	%
Alex Crane (X)		
Jonathon Hari		
Bishop Racicot (X)		
Brendan Rea		
John Sobolta		
Carly Torkkeli		

== Oliver Paipoonge ==
=== Mayor ===
The following were the results for mayor of Oliver Paipoonge. Municipal councillors Brandon Postuma and Rick Potter ran against incumbent mayor Lucy Kloosterhuis.

Mayoral Candidate	Vote	%
Lucy Kloosterhuis (X)	905	38.08
Rick Potter	771	32.44
Brandon Postuma	686	28.87

=== Municipal Council (4 to be elected) ===
Candidate	Vote	%
Donna Peacock	1,614	20.62
Bernie Kamphof (X)	1,510	19.30
Dan Calvert	1,240	15.84
Allan Vis (X)	1,220	15.59
Rick Baraniuk	824	10.53
James Cassan	739	9.44
Sabrina Ree	623	7.96

== Red Rock ==
=== Mayor ===
Darquise Robinson was re-elected mayor of Red Rock by acclamation.

Mayoral Candidate	Vote	%
Darquise Robinson (X)	Acclaimed	

=== Town Council (4 to be elected) ===
Candidate	Vote	%
Nancy Gladun	161	
Mickel Smith	156	
Cindy Brand	138	
Gordon R. Muir (X)	129	
Steve Carruthers	116	
Braeden Plemel	104	
Gary Nelson	103	
James Legacy	90	
Cam Todesco (X)	71	

== Schreiber ==
=== Mayor ===
The following were the results for mayor of Schreiber.

Mayoral Candidate	Vote	%
Kevin Mullins (X)	308	54.60
Dominic Commisso	148	31.38
Kim Krause	95	16.84
Adam Cherry	10	1.77

=== Town Council (4 to be elected) ===
Candidate	Vote	%
Anne-Marie Bourgeault	481	
Benjamin Bryson	311	
Daniel McGrath	307	
David Mauro (X)	258	
Carrie Moore	136	
Robert Fisk	122	
Mark Houston	110	
Jessica Payne	85	
Sandra Miller	73	
Doug Sales (X)	73	
Doug Stefurak (X)	55	

== Shuniah ==
=== Mayor ===
Mayoral Candidate	Vote	%
Wendy Landry (X)	Acclaimed	

=== Town Council ===
Candidate	Vote	%
MacGregor Ward (3 to be elected)
Donna Blunt (X)	Acclaimed	
Ron Giardetti (X)	Acclaimed	
Don Smith (X)	Acclaimed	
McTavish Ward (1 to be elected)
Meghan Chomut	167	58.2%
Dawn Powell	120	41.8%

== Terrace Bay ==
=== Mayor ===
The following were the results for mayor of Terrace Bay.

Mayoral Candidate	Vote	%
Paul Malashewski	417	64.95
Gino Leblanc	225	35.05

=== Town Council (4 to be elected) ===
Candidate	Vote	%
Gary Adduono	364	57%
Richard Brearley	252	39%
Chris Dube	381	59%
Bert Johnson (X)	315	49%
Helga MacKenzie	201	31%
Alan McDonald	78	12%
Rick St. Louis (X)	455	71%
Billy Webb	284	44%

== Thunder Bay ==
The following were the results for mayor and city council of Thunder Bay.

=== Mayor ===
In the race for mayor in 2022 in Thunder Bay were former two-time mayor and Liberal MP Ken Boshcoff, former Thunder Bay Chronicle-Journal publisher Clint Harris, at-large city councillor Peng You, entrepreneur Gary Mack and Lakehead University radio host Robert Szczepanski.

2022 Thunder Bay Mayoral election
- October 24, 2022
- Turnout: 42.96%
Candidate	Ken Boshcoff	Gary Mack
Popular vote	13,538	12,145
Percentage	38.22%	34.29%
Candidate	Peng You	Clint Harris
Popular vote	6,377	2,728
Percentage	18.00%	7.70%
Mayor before election
Bill Mauro
Elected mayor
Ken Boshcoff

Mayoral Candidate	Vote	%
Ken Boshcoff	13,538	38.22
Gary Mack	12,145	34.29
Peng You	6,377	18.00
Clinton Harris	2,728	7.70
Robert Szczepanski	633	1.79

=== City Council ===
Map of Thunder Bay's wards

Wards (1 to be elected)
Candidate	Vote	%
Current River
Andrew Foulds (X)	3,456	74.90
Duff Stewart	596	12.92
Andy Wolff	562	12.18
McIntyre
Alberto Aiello (X)	3,758	63.31
Brent A. Boyko	2,178	36.69
McKellar
Brian Hamilton (X)	2,178	53.50
Lori Paras	1,151	28.27
Cory Bagdon	392	9.63
Stephanie Danylko	350	8.60
Neebing
Greg Johnsen	1,322	36.14
Yuk-Sem Won	1,128	30.84
Debra Halvorsen	386	10.55
Brad DesRochers	338	9.24
Shaun Kennedy	291	7.96
Basil Lychowyd	193	5.28
Northwood
Dominic Pasqualino	1,957	41.84
Syed Kabir	944	20.18
Mike Maher	732	15.65
Bill Dell	601	12.85
Chris Krumpholz	443	9.47
Red River
Michael Zussino	2,115	33.49
Jason Veltri	1,999	31.65
Martin Rukavina	901	14.27
Katherine Suutari	593	9.39
James Dean Marsh	334	5.29
Brad Ford	373	5.91
Westfort
Kristen Oliver (X)	2,222	45.95
John Collins	1,955	40.43
Allan D. Corbett	344	7.11
David Tommasini	315	6.51

At Large (5 to be elected)
Candidate	Vote	%
Mark Bentz (X)	15,548	11.10
Shelby Ch'ng	13,222	9.44
Trevor Giertuga (X)	12,185	8.70
Rajni Agarwal	10,767	7.69
Kasey (Taylor) Etreni	10,184	7.27
Shane Judge	9,889	7.06
Rob Barrett	8,897	6.35
Stephen Margarit	7,530	5.37
Jim Mauro	6,809	4.86
Bob Hupka	5,733	4.09
Matthew Villella	5,231	3.73
Brian Tsubouchi	4,689	3.35
Adelina Pecchia	3,825	2.73
Tracey MacKinnon	3,767	2.69
Adetunde (Ade) Ogunberu	3,479	2.48
Iqbal Khan (IQ)	2,828	2.02
Dino Menei	2,775	1.98
Brian Joseph Phillips	2,628	1.88
Marilyn Cully	2,437	1.74
Dan Courtney	2,156	1.54
Allan Mihalcin	1,750	1.25
Donnalee Morettin	1,646	1.17
Robert Girardin	1,124	0.80
James Glavish	996	0.71

Incumbents not running for re-election

Position	Incumbent	Time in Office and Terms	
Mayor	Bill Mauro	2018 - 2022	1
Councillor at Large	Rebecca Johnson	2003 - 2022	5
Councillor at Large	Aldo Ruberto	2006 - 2022	4
Neebing Councillor	Cody Fraser	2018 - 2022	1
Red River Councillor	Brian McKinnon	2006 - 2022	4

== English Public School Board Elections ==
Lakehead District School Board (8 to be elected)
Candidate	Vote	%
Leah Vanderwey	11,108	10.95
Ellen Chambers (X)	10,902	10.75
Trudy Tuchenhagen (X)	9,675	9.54
George Saarinen (X)	8,955	8.83
Ron Oikonen (X)	8,727	8.60
Ryan Sitch (X)	7,681	7.57
Donica LeBlanc	7,578	7.47
Pat Johansen	7,446	7.34
Kelly Fettes	6,913	6.81
Gary Christian	6,802	6.70
Gary Johnson	6,791	6.69
Ahsanul Habib	4,876	4.81
Paul David Sequeira	3,999	3.94

Superior-Greenstone District School Board
Candidate	Vote	%
Greenstone (2 to be elected)
Allison Jarvis (X)	Acclaimed	
Patrick Liscomb	342	65.1%
Richard Baycroft	153	29.1%
Manitouwadge (1 to be elected)
Daniel Fairservice	368	65.5%
Joshua Barnes	194	34.5%
Marathon (2 to be elected)
Pauline MacRae (X)	563	
Megen Brunskill	480	
Julie Michano	398	
Lisa MacKenzie	212	
Nipigon (1 to be elected)
Julie Michano	Appointed*	
Red Rock (1 to be elected)
Kal Pristanski (X)	Acclaimed	
Schreiber/Terrace Bay (1 to be elected)
Jason Nesbitt (X)	Acclaimed	

== English Catholic School Board Elections ==
Thunder Bay Catholic District School Board (6 to be elected)
Candidate	Vote	%
Dina McFarlane (X)	4,866	
Francis Veneruz (X)	4,864	
Leanne Fonso	4,728	
Lawrence Badanai (X)	3,957	
Tony Romeo (X)	3,763	
Eleanor Ashe (X)	3,739	
Tony Pucci	3,633	
Anthony Foglia	2,993	
Gloria Gabrijelcic	1,912	
Matt Pearson	1,910	
Adam Shaen	1,909	

Superior North Catholic District School Board
Candidate	Vote	%
Greenstone (Beardmore, Geraldton, Nakina & Rural West)
Suzanne Lafrance	Acclaimed	
Greenstone (Longlac & Rural East)
Lilliana McPherson (X)	Acclaimed	
Marathon
Tara Patterson	Acclaimed	
Manitouwadge
	Vacant	
Nipigon
William Harmon (X)	Acclaimed	
Red Rock & Dorion
Shirley Jean (X)	Acclaimed	
Schreiber
Lawrence McParland (X)	Acclaimed	
Terrace Bay
Amanda Monks (X)	Acclaimed	

== French Public School Board Elections ==
Conseil scolaire public du Grand Nord de l'Ontario
Candidate	Vote	%
Manitouwadge & Marathon
Jocelyn Bourgoin (X)	Acclaimed	
Longlac & Thunder Bay
Anne-Marie Gélineault (X)	Acclaimed	

== French Catholic School Board Elections ==
Conseil scolaire de district catholique des Aurores boréales
Candidate	Vote	%
Thunder Bay (5 to be elected)
Angéle Desbiens (X)	Acclaimed	
Claudette Gleeson (X)	Acclaimed	
Elode Grunerud (X)	Acclaimed	
Victoria Mauro	Acclaimed	
Donald Pelletier (X)	Acclaimed	
Beardmore, Geraldton, Nakina & Rural West (2 to be elected)
Jean-Pierre Pelletier (X)	Acclaimed	
Monique Perreault (X)	Acclaimed	
Longlac & Rural East (1 to be elected)
Sylvia Payeur (X)	Acclaimed	
Schreiber & Terrace Bay (1 to be elected)
Réal Deschatelets (X)	Acclaimed	
Manitouwadge & Marathon (1 to be elected)
Maguy Lorek (X)	Acclaimed	
