= List of mayors of Thunder Bay =

This is a list of mayors of Thunder Bay and the former cities of Port Arthur and Fort William. Thunder Bay was incorporated in 1970, amalgamating the cities of Port Arthur and Fort William.

== Mayors of Thunder Bay (since 1970) ==
- Saul Laskin (1970–1972)
- Walter Assef (1973–1978)
- Dusty Miller (1978–1980)
- Walter Assef (1981–1985)
- Jack Masters (1986–1991)
- David Hamilton (1992–1997)
- Ken Boshcoff (1997–2003)
- Lynn Peterson (2003 – November 30, 2010)
- Keith Hobbs (December 1, 2010 – December 4, 2018)
- Bill Mauro (December 4, 2018 – 2022)
- Kyle Phillips (2022–present)

== Pre-Amalgamation ==
=== Mayors of Port Arthur (1884-1969) ===
From the incorporation of Port Arthur in May 1884 to December 1969.

- Thomas Marks (1884)
- James Conmee (1885)
- George Hugh Macdonell (1886–1888) and (1900)
- Thomas Ambrose Gorham (1889)
- Aaron Squier (1890)
- James Farrand Ruttan (1891–1892)
- George Thomas Marks (1893–1899)
- Isaac Lamont Matthews (1901–1902) and (1909–1910) and (1920–1923)
- George O.P. Clavet (1903–1904) and (1906–1907)
- Richard Vigars (1905)
- John James Carrick (1908)
- Samuel Wellington Ray (1911–1912)
- John Albert Oliver (1913–1914)
- James Patrick Mooney (1915)
- Donald James Cowan (1916–1917)
- Edward John Blaquier (1918–1919)
- James White Crooks (1924–1925)
- Milton Francis (1926–1927)
- John Oswald Hourigan (1928)
- George Gibbon (1929–1930)
- Percy Victor Ibbetson (1931–1932)
- George Blanchard (1933)
- Charles Winnans Cox (1934–1948) and (1952)
- Frederick Oliver Robinson (1949–1951) and (1953–August 1955)
- Albert James Hinton (September–December 1955)
- Eunice Marian Wishart (1956–1958)
- Norman Robert Wilson (1959–1961)
- Saul Laskin (1962–1969)

=== Mayors of Fort William (1892-1969) ===
From the incorporation of Fort William in April 1892 to December 1969.

- John McKellar (1892–1898)
- Charles William Jarvis (1899–1900)
- Walter Frederick Hogarth (1901)
- Joshua Dyke (1902–1903)
- Clarence Hugh Jackson (1904)
- Edward Saunders Rutledge (1905–1906)
- James Murphy (1907–1908)
- Louis Lawrence Peltier (1909–1910)
- Samuel Crawford Young (1911–May 1912) and (1914–1915)
- George Alexander Graham (June 1912–1913)
- Harry Murphy (1916–1919)
- Albert Hugh Dennis (1920–1921)
- Newton Edmeston (1922–1925)
- Joseph Edmund Crawford (1926–1928)
- Nathaniel Bascome Darrell (1929–1930)
- Eugene Grimes Murphy (1931–1932)
- Robert Barclay Pow (1933–1936)
- Benjamin Charles Hardiman (1937)
- Chisholm Mackenzie Ross (1938–1942)
- Garfield Anderson (1943–1948)
- Hubert Badanai (1949–1952) and (1955–1958)
- Edward Gordon Carson (1953–1954)
- Catherine Seppala (1959–September 1960)
- John Oliver Booth (September–December 1960)
- Ernest H. Reid (1961–1969)
