= 2014 Thunder Bay District municipal elections =

Elections were held in the organized municipalities in the Thunder Bay District of Ontario on October 27, 2014, in conjunction with municipal elections across the province.

== Conmee ==
Mayoral Candidate	Vote	%
Kevin Holland (X)	Acclaimed	

Councillor Candidates (4)	Vote	%
Grant Arnold (incumbent)	153	22.1%
Cathy Woodbeck (incumbent)	153	22.1%
Sheila Maxwell	146	21.1%
Bob MacMaster (incumbent)	134	19.4%
L.O. (Mutti) Pajamaki	106	15.3%

== Dorion ==
Reeve Candidate	Vote	%
Ed Chambers (X)	Acclaimed	

Councillor Candidates (4)	Vote	%
Robert Beatty (incumbent)	Acclaimed	
Kim Brown	Acclaimed	
Carter Ann (Kitty) Dumonski (incumbent)	Acclaimed	
Donald Modin (incumbent)	Acclaimed	

== Gillies ==
Reeve Candidate	Vote	%
Rick Kieri (X)	Acclaimed	

Councillor Candidates (4)	Vote	%
Karen O'Gorman	139	25.3%
Wendy Wright	115	20.9%
Rudy Buitenhuis (X)	110	20%
William Groenheide (X)	106	19.3%
Henry Janunen (X)	79	14.4%

== Greenstone ==
Mayoral Candidate	Vote	%
Renald Y. Beaulieu (X)	Acclaimed	

Beardmore Ward Councillor Candidates (1)	Vote	%
Claudette Trottier	87	39.4%
Kevin Melanson (incumbent)	62	28.1%
Edwin Fisher	45	20.4%
Line Clarke	23	10.4%
Guy Peter Gladu	4	1.8%

Geraldton Ward Councillor Candidates (2)	Vote	%
William Assad (incumbent)	421	28%
Eric Pietsch	319	21.2%
Harold Donohue	292	19.4%
Chris Walterson (incumbent)	291	19.4%
Eileen Johnson	179	12%

Longlac Ward Councillor Candidates (2)	Vote	%
James McPherson	219	31.9%
Sylvie Lemieux	253	25.3%
Elaine Mannisto	173	17.3%
Mary Moylan (incumbent)	162	16.2%
Jane Jantunen (incumbent)	93	9.3%

Nakina Ward Councillor Candidates (1)	Vote	%
Matthew S. Donovan	154	63%
Jay Daiter (incumbent)	91	37%

Rural East Councillor Candidates (1)	Vote	%
Armand Giguere (incumbent)	74	65%
Gloria McCraw	23	20%
Martin Boucher	17	15%

Rural West Councillor Candidates (1)	Vote	%
Andre Blanchard	52	49.1%
Ron Melhuish (incumbent)	43	39.8%
Suzanne Brabant	12	11.1%

== Manitouwadge ==
Mayoral Candidates	Vote	%
Andy Major	378	54.62
John MacEachern (X)	314	45.38

Councillor Candidates (4)	Vote	%
Ed Dunnill	Acclaimed	
Raymond Lelièvre	Acclaimed	
Sheldon Plummer (incumbent)	Acclaimed	
Peter Ruel	Acclaimed	

== Marathon ==
Mayoral Candidate	Vote	%
Rick Dumas (X)	Acclaimed	

Councillor Candidates (4)	Vote	%
Terry Fox (incumbent)		
Roy Lake (incumbent)		
Kelly Tsubouchi (incumbent)		
Chantal Gingras		
Darlene Cross		
Chris Richer		
Julie Sparrow		

== Neebing ==
Mayoral Candidate	Vote	%
Ziggy Polkowski (X)	Acclaimed	

Councillor Candidates	Vote	%
At Large (1)
Edwin Butikofer	Acclaimed	
Crooks (1)
Brian Wright	Acclaimed	
Pardee Township (1)
Curtis Coulson (incumbent)	Acclaimed	
Pearson Township (1)
Bill Lankinen (incumbent)	Acclaimed	
Scoble Township (1)
Mike McCooeye (incumbent)	Acclaimed	
Blake Township (1)
Roger Shott (incumbent)		
Jim Aitken		

== Nipigon ==
Mayoral Candidate	Vote	%
Richard Harvey (X)	Acclaimed	

Councillor Candidates (4)	Vote	%
James Foulds (incumbent)	390	22.6%
Gordon Mackenzie (incumbent)	360	20.8%
Michael Elliot	293	17%
Levina Collins (incumbent)	269	15.6%
Zachary Goneau Cheetham	158	9.1%
Glenn Hart	145	8.4%
Don Conci	112	6.5%

== O'Connor ==
Mayoral Candidate	Vote	%
Ron Nelson (X)	Acclaimed	

Councillor Candidates (4)	Vote	%
Bishop Racicot (incumbent)	125	25.3%
Jerry Loan (incumbent)	110	22.3%
Jim Venezia (incumbent)	110	22.3%
Kevin Foekens	102	20.6%
Gwen Garbutt (incumbent)	47	9.5%

== Oliver Paipoonge ==
Mayoral Candidate	Vote	%
Lucy Kloosterhuis (X)	Acclaimed	

Councillor Candidates (4)	Vote	%
Bernie Kamphof (incumbent)	1,015	21.6%
Allan Vis (incumbent)	902	19.2%
Jim Byers (incumbent)	755	16%
Alana Bishop	682	14.5%
Dan Calvert	636	13.5%
Eric Collingwood (incumbent)	510	10.8%
John Lower	206	4.4%

== Red Rock ==
Mayoral Candidate	Vote	%
Gary Nelson (X)	307	74.15
Raymond Rivard	107	25.85

Councillor Candidates (4)	Vote	%
Darquise Robinson (incumbent)	245	16.1%
Sara Park (incumbent)	219	14.4%
Steven Carruthers (incumbent)	215	14.1%
Lewis Martin	197	12.9%
Larry Woods	179	11.8%
Michael Groulx	160	10.5%
Cindy Brand	150	9.8%
Beatrice Jean	81	5.3%
James Legacy	77	5.1%

== Schreiber ==
Mayoral Candidate	Vote	%
Mark Figliomeni (X)	Acclaimed	

Councillor Candidates (4)	Vote	%
Dave Hamilton	463	24.7%
David Mauro	343	18.3%
Douglas Sales	259	13.8%
Bob Krause (incumbent)	242	12.9%
Daniel McGrath	218	11.6%
Lorraine Huard (incumbent)	162	8.6%
Danny Goedhard	128	6.8%
Kelly McCoy	56	3%

== Shuniah ==
Reeve Candidate	Vote	%
Wendy Landry	1,310	63.53
Maria Harding (X)	752	36.47

== Terrace Bay ==
Mayoral Candidate	Vote	%
Jody Davis (X)	Acclaimed	

== Thunder Bay ==
Mayoral Candidate	Vote	%
Keith Hobbs (X)	14,463	38.96
Ken Boshcoff	12,051	32.46
Shane Judge	9,531	25.67
Colin Burridge	412	1.11
Douglas David Mackay	362	0.98
Henry Wojak	304	0.82

At Large	Vote	%
Iain Angus (X)	15,861	10.78
Larry Hebert (X)	14,664	9.97
Rebecca Johnson (X)	14,620	9.94
Aldo Ruberto (X)	14,311	9.73
Frank Pullia	14,112	9.59
Tamara Johnson	10,207	6.94
Lawrence Timko	9,164	6.23
Barry Streib	8,972	6.10
Terri-Lynne Carter	6,856	4.66
Andrew Brigham	5,752	3.91
Sargon Khubyar	5,465	3.71
Robin Rickards	5,082	3.45
Chris Holland	4,475	3.04
Diane Armstrong	4,406	2.99
Kimberly Coreau	3,714	2.52
Norm Sponchia	3,029	2.05
Ian Convey	2,856	1.94
Wolfgang Schoor	2,783	1.89
Ed Hailio	1,011	0.68

Current River	Vote	%
Andrew Foulds (X)	3,098	64.86
Andy Wolff	698	14.61
Claudio Monteleone	532	11.13
Dick Waddington	448	9.38

Red River	Vote	%
Brian McKinnon (X)	3,341	52.55
David George Noonan	2072	32.59
James Dean Marsh	558	8.77
Paul Sloan	386	6.07

McKeller	Vote	%
Paul Pugh (X)	3,341	52.52
Kristian Kuznak	1,099	25.80
Douglas Powell	923	21.67

McIntyre	Vote	%
Trevor Giertuga (X)	2,363	42.56
Wesley Ramage	1,402	25.25
Logan Ollivier	1,007	18.13
Mike Komar	780	14.04

Northwood	Vote	%
Shelby Ch'ng	2,157	38.38
Mark Bentz (X)	1,639	29.16
Jim Mauro	1,184	21.07
Frank Armiento	639	11.37

Westfort	Vote	%
Joe Virdiramo (X)	1,680	30.40
Frank Scarcello	1,635	29.58
Beatrice Metzler	1,406	25.44
John P. Radl	805	14.56

Neebing	Vote	%
Linda Rydholm (X)	2,141	58.54
Geoff Abthorpe	821	22.45
Austin Haner	695	19.00
