= Clavet =

Clavet may refer to:

== People ==
- Bruno Clavet (born 1989), French politician
- Francisco Clavet (born 1968), Spanish tennis player
- George Clavet (1943/45–1909), Canadian politician
- José Clavet (born 1965), Spanish tennis player
- Roger Clavet (born 1953), Canadian politician

== Places ==
- Clavet, Saskatchewan
