= Walter Assef =

Canadian politician (1913–1988)

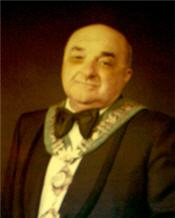

2nd Mayor of Thunder Bay
- In office 1973–1978
- Preceded by: Saul Laskin
- Succeeded by: Dusty Miller
- In office 1981–1985
- Succeeded by: Jack Masters

Personal details
- Born: May 31, 1913 Sioux Lookout, Ontario
- Died: January 14, 1988 (aged 74) Thunder Bay, Ontario

Walter Melund Assef (May 31, 1913 – January 14, 1988) was a Canadian politician and former Vaudevillian who served as mayor of the city of Thunder Bay, Ontario. He was the first, and until 2022 when Ken Boshcoff was elected for a discontinuous term, the only mayor to have been elected for two discontinuous terms. He was first elected in 1973 and served until 1978. His second term began when he was re-elected in 1981 and lasted until 1985.

Assef was born May 31, 1913, at Sioux Lookout, Ontario to John Hunna Khaleefy Asseff, a native of Hasroun, Lebanon, and Maria Rosa Penteado (variant spelling, Mary Penteado), a native of Brazil. He died January 14, 1988.

Liberace dined at the home of Walter Assef before performing at the Fort William Gardens on 30 September 1961.

As mayor, his nickname was "Jolly Wally". Reportedly, Prince Philip coined the term, referring to him as "that jolly little mayor from Thunder Bay". His predecessor as mayor, Saul Laskin, did not see him that way - Laskin found Assef disruptive and uncooperative. By his second term in office, many observers deplored his behaviour in council as abusive.

One of the issues he campaigned strongly against was the building of a stand-alone arts complex in the city. When the Community Auditorium (as it's now known) was built, Walter Assef vowed to never attend the grand opening or ever step inside. A populist, Assef once campaigned with a cow.

== Bibliography ==
- Peter Raffo, "Municipal political culture and conflict of interest at the Lakehead, 1969–1972," Thunder Bay Historical Museum Society Papers and Records, 26 (1998), 26-45.
