= Penny Petrone =

Canadian writer (1925–2005)

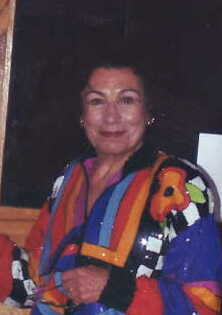
- Dr Penny Petrone, in 2000.
- Born: 1925; Port Arthur, Ontario, Canada
- Died: August 22, 2005 (aged 79–80)
- Education: University of Alberta
- Occupations: writer, educator, patron of the arts, and philanthropist

Dr. Penny Serafina Petrone (1925 – August 22, 2005) was a Canadian writer, educator, patron of the arts, and philanthropist.

== Early life and education ==
She was the daughter of Luisa Sisco and Luigi Petrone and sister to the lawyer Alfred Petrone. She was born in Port Arthur, Ontario (now part of Thunder Bay). She attended St. Joseph's School and the Port Arthur Collegiate Institute, where she won the first Canadian Federation of University Women scholarship given to an outstanding Grade 13 female student in the Lakehead.

== Career ==
She received her Doctorate in English Literature from the University of Alberta. Her research on the Canadian poet Isabella Valancy Crawford resulted in two books: The Selected Short Stories of Isabella Valancy Crawford and The Fairy Tales of Isabella Valancy Crawford.

Petrone also pioneered the critical study of aboriginal literature in Canada with her landmark books First People, First Voices and Northern Voices. Her Native Literature in Canada was the first book-length history of the literature of Canada's First Peoples. For this ground-breaking research, Petrone was made an honorary Indian Chief by the Gull Bay Ojibwa and gained international recognition.

After her retirement from Lakehead University, Petrone's scholarly focus shifted to the study of her Italian heritage. She formed 'I Literati', a local reading group which focused on Italy's cultural heritage in the fields of literature, art, music, history and film as well as on the Italian immigrant experience in North America.

== Other works ==
She also wrote two memoirs, Breaking the Mould (1995) and Embracing Serafina (2000). Her book Breaking the Mould was translated into Italian and launched at the University of Rome, La Sapienza in July 2005. Her latest book, finished during the last months of her life was Schoolmarm (2007), in which Petrone recalls a teaching career that began at North Bay Normal School, her time spent in one-room schools in rural Port Arthur, and culminating at the Lakehead University Faculty of Education where she taught teachers.

She also served on the Canada Council and the Ontario Arts Council. Over the years she held various executive offices in teachers' organizations and in the Canadian Federation of University Women.

== Honours and awards ==
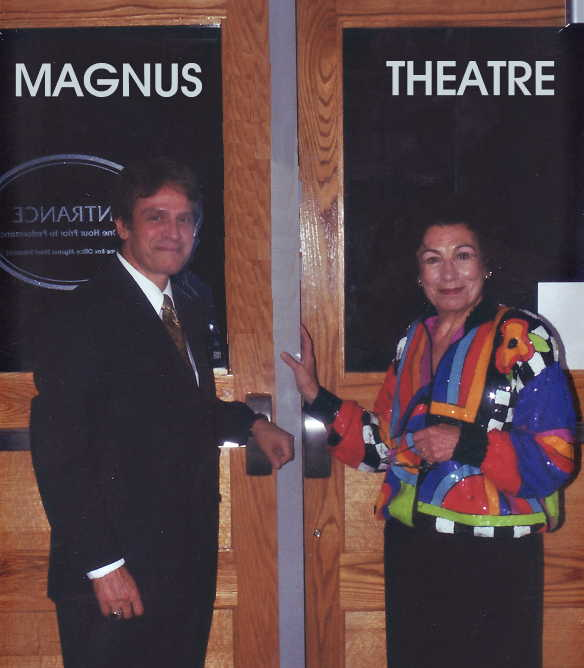
Artistic Director Mario Crudo and Dr. Penny Petrone opening the doors to New Theatre - 2000

During her lifetime, Petrone received many honours and awards: The Corporation of the City of Thunder Bay Citizens of Exceptional Achievement Awards (Culture) in 1981, 1984, and 1989, L'ordine d'onore from the National Congress of Italian Canadians (1994); the Order of Ontario (1992); Canada 124 Medal (1992); Honorary Citizen of Piane Crate (1997); the Golden Jubilee Medal (2002); the F. G. Bressani Literary Award (2002); the Kouhi award for 'her outstanding contribution to writing in Northwestern Ontario' (May 2004). Petrone was also the recipient of Lakehead University's first 'Distinguished Teacher' Award in 1989 and the Ontario Confederation of University Faculty Associations teaching award (1988).

Two buildings have been named after her. Her contributions to the arts in Thunder Bay is noted in the renaming of Magnus Theatre in Thunder Bay to Magnus Theatre - The Dr. S. Penny Petrone Centre for the Performing Arts. In honour of her commitment, through the endowment of scholarships and bursaries of over a million dollars for students at the then Lakehead University campus of the Northern Ontario School of Medicine (NOSM), the facility which houses the West Campus of the NOSM Health Sciences Library is now called the Dr. Serafina "Penny" Petrone Health Information Resource Centre.
