= 2006 Thunder Bay municipal election =

Election in Ontario, Canada

The 2006 Thunder Bay municipal election was held on 13 November 2006 in Thunder Bay, Ontario, Canada, to elect a mayor, 12 city councillors, trustees for the Lakehead District School Board, the Thunder Bay Catholic District School Board, the Conseil scolaire de district du Grand Nord de l'Ontario, and the Conseil scolaire de district catholique des Aurores boréales. This election coincided with the 2006 Ontario municipal elections being held across Ontario.

== Thunder Bay City Council ==
Voters are asked to elect a mayor, five at-large city councillors and seven ward councillors to the Thunder Bay City Council. Of 86,914 registered voters, 33,196 votes were cast and 33,192 votes were counted. Voter turnout was the lowest in the city's history at 38.2%.

=== Mayor ===
Three candidates ran for the office of mayor. The incumbent, Lynn Peterson, was re-elected by a considerable margin.

Candidate	Vote	%
Lynn Peterson (X)	26,561	84.9
Jim Gamble	2,733	8.7
Douglas David Mackay	1,988	6.4
Total	31,282	

=== Councillors at-large ===
Five councillors are elected at-large to sit on City Council. Fifteen people ran for the position in 2006. Each registered voter can choose up to five candidates.

Candidate	Vote	%
Iain Angus (X)	17,980	12.9
Larry Hebert	17,549	12.5
Rebecca Johnson (X)	16,030	11.5
Frank Pullia	15,392	11.1
Aldo V. Ruberto	14,731	10.5
Lawrence Timko (X)	13,330	9.5
Bill Scollie (X)	10,806	7.7
Doug Scott	8,538	6.1
Sargon Khubyar	6,891	4.9
Vince Riccio	5,142	3.7
Charles Campbell	3,857	2.7
Richard Moorey	3,445	2.5
Terrence A. Yahn	2,997	2.1
Christopher Mills	2,457	1.8
Marvin Robert McMenemy	780	0.6
Total	139,925	

=== Ward councillors ===
Map of Thunder Bay's seven municipal wards

The city of Thunder Bay is divided into seven electoral wards: Current River, McIntyre, McKellar, Neebing, Northwood, Red River, and Westfort. Residents of each ward elect one member to represent their ward on city council. Twenty people ran for these positions in five wards. The incumbent councillors in Northwood and Neebing wards were acclaimed.

==== Current River ====
Candidate	Vote	%
Andrew Foulds	2,701	61.2
Dick Waddington (X)	731	16.6
Tony Kolic	518	11.7
David Tranter	461	10.5
Total	4,411	

==== McIntyre ====
Candidate	Vote	%
Trevor Giertuga (X)	2,428	51.4
Mark Wright	2,299	48.6
Total	4,727	

==== McKellar ====
On 18 October 2007 Andy Savela announced his resignation to take on further responsibilities with the Canadian Auto Workers. City council voted 6–5 on 5 November 2007 to appoint Robert Tuchenhagen, to the position. Tuchenhagen was defeated by Savela by 377 votes. He was sworn in on 19 November 2007.

Candidate	Vote	%
Andy Savela (resigned)	1,875	45.3
Robert Tuchenhagen (X) (appointed)	1,500	36.2
Mirano Milhaljevic	325	7.8
Peter Panetta	319	7.7
Greg Chvets	125	3.0
Total	4,144	

==== Neebing ====
The incumbent, Linda Rydholm, was acclaimed.

==== Northwood ====
The incumbent, Mark Bentz, was acclaimed.

==== Red River ====
Candidate	Vote	%
Brian McKinnon	2,183	36.1
Allan Laakkonen (X)	1,623	26.8
Paul B. Wolfe	1,402	23.2
Bill Bartley	845	14.0
Total	6,053	

==== Westfort ====
Candidate	Vote	%
Joe Virdiramo (X)	3311	66.4
Frank Armiento	973	19.5
Tommy Milestone Horricks	701	14.1
Total	4,985	

== District School Boards ==
Three boards of education to which voters elect trustees operate in the city of Thunder Bay. The Lakehead District School Board is an English language public school board and elects 8 trustees at-large in the Thunder Bay Census Metropolitan Area, the Thunder Bay Catholic District School Board is an English language separate school board and elects 6 trustees at-large in the Thunder Bay Census Metropolitan Area, the Conseil scolaire de district du Grand Nord de l'Ontario is a French language public school board and elects one trustee from Northwestern Ontario, and the Conseil scolaire de district catholique des Aurores boréales is a French language separate school board and elects 4 trustees at-large in Northwestern Ontario.

=== Lakehead District School Board ===
Eight trustees are elected to the Lakehead District School Board by registered voters in the city of Thunder Bay, the six municipalities in its CMA, and voters in the unorganized portion of Thunder Bay District. Each registered voter can choose up to eight candidates. Thirteen people ran for this position.

Candidate	Vote	%
Karen Wilson	13,475	10.6
Ron Oikonen	10,947	8.6
Trudy Tuchenhagen	10,646	8.4
George Saarinen	10,368	8.1
Deborah Massaro	10,250	8.0
Don Kerr	10,004	7.9
Bill Mokomela	9,918	7.8
Lori A. Lukinuk	9,683	7.6
Margaret Reynolds	9,592	7.5
Charlotte Matson	9,044	7.1
Jack Playford	8,446	6.6
David Ogden	8,140	6.4
Avery Dorland	6,858	5.4
Total	127,371	

=== Thunder Bay Catholic District School Board ===
Six trustees are elected to the Thunder Bay Catholic District School Board by registered Roman Catholic voters in the city of Thunder Bay, the six municipalities in its CMA, and voters in the unorganized portion of Thunder Bay District. Each registered voter can choose up to six candidates. Fourteen people ran for this position.

Candidate	Vote	%
Kathy O'Brien	5,360	11.9
Philip Colosimo	4,991	11.1
Doug Demeo	4,930	10.9
Tony Romeo	4,018	9.0
Bob Hupka	3,703	8.2
Elanor Ashe	3,666	8.1
Genevieve (Knauff) Wiens	3,214	7.1
Mandi O'Connor	2,869	6.4
Sam Frederico	2,798	6.2
Marie Piccolo-Morin	2,536	5.6
Vince Fragale	2,209	4.9
J. Douglas Corbett	2,084	4.6
Saverio Prete	1,612	3.6
Lawrence Deswiage	1,146	2.5
Total	45,136	

=== Conseil scolaire de district du Grand Nord de l'Ontario ===
One trustee is elected to the Conseil scolaire de district du Grand Nord de l'Ontario by registered voters with French-language education rights in Northwestern Ontario.

Candidate	Vote	%
Anne-Marie Gelineault	106	66.3
Joseph Richard Forget	54	33.8
Total	160	

=== Conseil scolaire de district catholique des Aurores boréales ===
Four trustees are elected to the Conseil scolaire de district catholique des Aurores boréales by registered Roman Catholic voters with French-language education rights in Northwestern Ontario. All four candidates, Anne Breton, Angele M. M. Brunelle, Bernard Caron and Claudette Gleeson, were acclaimed.

== See also ==
- Thunder Bay City Council
- 2006 Ontario municipal elections
