= Bill Mauro =

Canadian politician

The Honourable Bill Mauro ECO
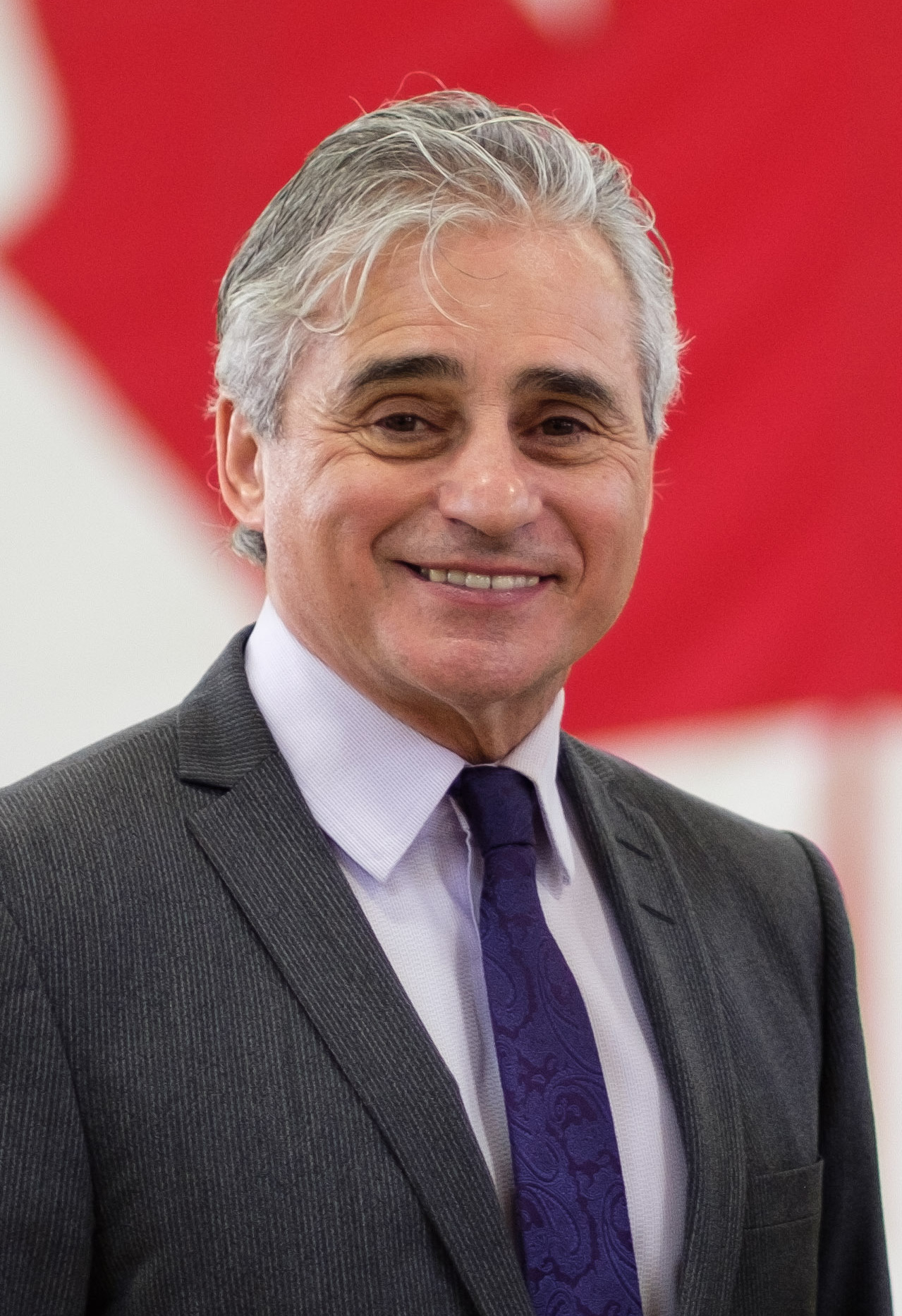
- Mauro in 2020

9th Mayor of Thunder Bay
- In office December 1, 2018 – November 15, 2022
- Preceded by: Keith Hobbs
- Succeeded by: Ken Boshcoff

Ontario MPP
- In office October 2, 2003 – June 7, 2018
- Preceded by: Lyn McLeod
- Succeeded by: Judith Monteith-Farrell
- Constituency: Thunder Bay—Atikokan

Personal details
- Born: William Joseph Mauro; 1956 (age 69–70)
- Party: Independent
- Other political affiliations: Liberal
- Occupation: Property manager

William Joseph Mauro (born c. 1956) is a Canadian politician in Ontario, Canada. He served as the 9th mayor of Thunder Bay from 2018 to 2022. He was previously a Liberal member of the Legislative Assembly of Ontario from 2003 to 2018, representing the riding of Thunder Bay—Atikokan and serving as a cabinet minister in the government of Kathleen Wynne.

== Background ==
Mauro was educated at Lakehead University teacher's college in Thunder Bay, and worked as a property manager for fourteen years before entering provincial politics. He served as a city councillor on the Thunder Bay City Council from 1997 to 2003, and was a member of the Thunder Bay Hydro board and the Thunder Bay Regional Hospital.

== Politics ==
In the provincial election of 2003, Mauro was elected as a Liberal in Thunder Bay—Atikokan. He defeated his New Democrat candidate John Rafferty by over 11,000 votes. In the 2007 election he faced Rafferty again this time by a narrow margin of 50 votes. He was easily re-elected in the 2011, and 2014 elections. In the 2018 election, he lost his seat to New Democrat Judith Monteith-Farrell by just 81 votes.

During his time in government he has served in several Parliamentary Assistant roles assisting ministers including the Minister of Northern Development and Mines (2003–2007, 2011–2013) and the Minister of Natural Resources (2007–2009). On March 25, 2014, Premier Kathleen Wynne appointed Mauro as Minister of Municipal Affairs and Housing. On June 24 after the election she appointed Mauro as the Minister of Natural Resources and Forestry. After fellow cabinet minister Michael Gravelle temporarily stepped aside in February 2017, Mauro also took over his duties as Ministry of Northern Development and Mines on a temporary basis.

In 2004, he announced that the provincial government would be spending almost $1 million to improve Thunder Bay's transportation service. He is also known to favour a return of the spring bear hunt.

Following his defeat in the 2018 provincial election, he announced his candidacy for mayor in the 2018 municipal election. He won that election, and became mayor of the city on December 1, 2018. Mauro did not seek re-election as Mayor in the 2022 municipal elections.

=== Cabinet positions ===
Wynne ministry, Province of Ontario (2013–2018)
Cabinet posts (3)
Predecessor	Office	Successor
Ted McMeekin	Minister of Municipal Affairs; 2016–2018	Steve Clark
David Orazietti	Minister of Natural Resources and Forestry; 2014–2016	Kathryn McGarry
Linda Jeffrey	Minister of Municipal Affairs and Housing; 2014 (March–June)	Ted McMeekin

== Electoral record ==
=== Municipal ===
2018 Thunder Bay Mayoral Election
Candidate	Vote	%
Bill Mauro	13,940	33.91
Frank Pullia	13,178	32.06
Iain Angus	5,816	14.15
Shane Judge	5,155	12.54
Ronald Chookomolin	895	2.18
Mariann Sawicki	792	1.93
Peter Panetta	708	1.72
Wolfgang Schoor	244	0.59
Jim Gamble	189	0.46
Kevin Cernjul	151	0.37
Ed Hailio	40	0.10

=== Provincial ===
2018 Ontario general election: Thunder Bay—Atikokan
Party	Candidate	Votes	%	±%
New Democratic	Judith Monteith-Farrell	11,793	36.26	+8.15
Liberal	Bill Mauro	11,712	36.01	-16.97
Progressive Conservative	Brandon Postuma	7,555	23.23	+10.04
Green	John Northey	880	2.71	-0.66
Northern Ontario	David Bruno	469	1.44	+0.99
Libertarian	Dorothy Snell	116	0.36	-1.55
Total valid votes		32,525	99.03	
Total rejected, unmarked and declined ballots		317	0.97	+0.17
Turnout		32,842	54.74	+5.72
Eligible voters		59,996		
New Democratic gain from Liberal		Swing		+12.56
Source: Elections Ontario

2014 Ontario general election
Party	Candidate	Votes	%	±%
Liberal	Bill Mauro	15,176	52.98	+14.01
New Democratic	Mary Kozorys	8,052	28.11	-9.20
Progressive Conservative	Harold Wilson	3,779	13.19	-8.77
Green	John Northey	964	3.37	+1.94
Libertarian	Joe Talarico	547	1.91	
Northern Ontario Heritage	Ed Deibel	129	0.45	
Total valid votes		28,647	99.20	
Total rejected, unmarked and declined ballots		231	0.80	
Turnout		28,878	49.02	
Eligible voters		58,908		
Liberal hold		Swing		+11.56
Source: Elections Ontario

2011 Ontario general election
Party	Candidate	Votes	%	±%
Liberal	Bill Mauro	10,319	38.97	+1.28
New Democratic	Mary Kozorys	9,881	37.31	-0.21
Progressive Conservative	Fred Gilbert	5,815	21.96	+1.55
Green	Jonathan Milnes	379	1.43	-2.95
Independent	Marvin Robert McMenemy	86	0.32	
Total valid votes		26,480	100.00	
Total rejected, unmarked and declined ballots		98	0.37	
Turnout		26,578	46.61	
Eligible voters		57,027		
Liberal hold		Swing		+0.75
Source: Elections Ontario

2007 Ontario general election
Party	Candidate	Votes	%	±%
Liberal	Bill Mauro	10,928	37.69	-20.55
New Democratic	John Rafferty	10,878	37.52	+15.88
Progressive Conservative	Rebecca Johnson	5,918	20.41	+2.78
Green	Russ Aegard	1,270	4.38	+1.89
Total valid votes		28,994	100.00	

2003 Ontario general election
Party	Candidate	Votes	%	±%
Liberal	Bill Mauro	17,735	58.25	-5.78
New Democratic	John Rafferty	6,582	21.62	+4.86
Progressive Conservative	Brian McKinnon	5,365	17.62	-1.59
Green	Kristin Boyer	762	2.5	
Total valid votes		30,444	100.00	
