= Iain Angus =

Canadian politician

City Councillor for Thunder Bay
- In office December 1, 2003 – December 1, 2018

President of the New Democratic Party
- In office 1995–1997
- Preceded by: Nancy Riche
- Succeeded by: Ed Tchorzewski

Member of Parliament for Thunder Bay—Atikokan
- In office September 4, 1984 – October 25, 1993
- Preceded by: Paul McRae
- Succeeded by: Stan Dromisky

Ontario MPP
- In office 1975–1977
- Preceded by: Jim Jessiman
- Succeeded by: Mickey Hennessy
- Constituency: Fort William

Personal details
- Born: June 1, 1947 (age 78) Fort William, Ontario, Canada
- Party: New Democrat
- Spouse: Marlene Sylvia Lindsay
- Profession: Community-development worker, park planner

Iain Francis Angus (born June 1, 1947) is a Canadian politician, who has served in the Legislative Assembly of Ontario and the House of Commons of Canada, as well as on Thunder Bay City Council.

Then an employee with the city of Thunder Bay, Angus entered electoral politics in the 1975 provincial election as the Ontario New Democratic Party candidate in Fort William. He served until the 1977 election, when he was defeated by Mickey Hennessy.

He returned to work for the city, unsuccessfully standing as a federal New Democratic Party candidate in the 1979 and 1980 elections for the electoral district of Thunder Bay—Atikokan. On his third campaign as a federal candidate, he was elected in the 1984 election, winning over Progressive Conservative candidate Ken Boshcoff by a margin of 2,675 votes. He served until the 1993 election, when he was defeated by Liberal candidate Stan Dromisky.

Angus subsequently launched his own business as a consultant. He was elected to the Thunder Bay City Council in the 2003 municipal election and was re-elected in 2006, 2010, and 2014. He ran unsuccessfully for mayor in the 2018 municipal election.

== Electoral record ==
2018 Thunder Bay Mayoral Election	Vote	%
Bill Mauro	13,940	33.91
Frank Pullia	13,178	32.06
Iain Angus	5,816	14.15
Shane Judge	5,155	12.54
Ronald Chookomolin	895	2.18
Mariann Sawicki	792	1.93
Peter Panetta	708	1.72
Wolfgang Schoor	244	0.59
Jim Gamble	189	0.46
Kevin Cernjul	151	0.37
Ed Hailio	40	0.10

2014 Thunder Bay City Council election	Vote	%
Iain Angus (X)	15,861	10.78
Larry Hebert (X)	14,664	9.97
Rebecca Johnson (X)	14,620	9.94
Aldo Ruberto (X)	14,311	9.73
Frank Pullia	14,112	9.59
Tamara Johnson	10,207	6.94
Lawrence Timko	9,164	6.23
Barry Streib	8,972	6.10
Terri-Lynne Carter	6,856	4.66
Andrew Brigham	5,752	3.91
Sargon Khubyar	5,465	3.71
Robin Rickards	5,082	3.45
Chris Holland	4,475	3.04
Diane Armstrong	4,406	2.99
Kimberly Coreau	3,714	2.52
Norm Sponchia	3,029	2.05
Ian Convey	2,856	1.94
Wolfgang Schoor	2,783	1.89
Ed Hailio	1,011	0.68

1993 Canadian federal election: Thunder Bay—Atikokan
Party	Candidate	Votes	%
Liberal	Stan Dromisky	19,947	57.4%
New Democratic	Iain Angus	6,555	18.9%
Reform	Colyne Gibbons	5,380	15.5%
Progressive Conservative	Tony Stehmann	2,836	8.2%

1988 Canadian federal election: Thunder Bay—Atikokan
Party	Candidate	Votes	%
New Democratic	Iain Angus	13,132	35.9%
Liberal	Stan Dromisky	11,968	32.7%
Progressive Conservative	Ken Boshcoff	11,454	31.3%
Communist	Paul Pugh	75	0.2%

1984 Canadian federal election: Thunder Bay—Atikokan
Party	Candidate	Votes	%
New Democratic	Iain Angus	14,715	41.5%
Progressive Conservative	Ken Boshcoff	12,040	34.0%
Liberal	Dale Willoughby	8,704	24.5%

1980 Canadian federal election: Thunder Bay—Atikokan
Party	Candidate	Votes	%
Liberal	Paul McRae	13,234	39.2%
New Democratic	Iain Angus	13,150	39.0%
Progressive Conservative	Ken Moffat	7,225	21.4%
Libertarian	Nora Ronis	87	0.3%
Marxist–Leninist	Dianne Robinson	35	0.1%

1979 Canadian federal election: Thunder Bay—Atikokan
Party	Candidate	Votes	%
Liberal	Paul McRae	11,921	34.9%
New Democratic	Iain Angus	11,667	34.1%
Progressive Conservative	Ken Moffatt	10,392	30.4%
Libertarian	Nora Ronis	92	0.3%
Communist	Walter E. Rogers	84	0.2%
Marxist–Leninist	Doris Stevens	29	0.1%
