= Dusty Miller (politician) =

Eleanor Joan 'Dusty' Miller

3rd Mayor of Thunder Bay
- In office 1978–1980
- Preceded by: Walter Assef
- Succeeded by: Walter Assef

Personal details
- Born: Eleanor Joan Faircloth; August 3, 1929 Fort William, Ontario, Canada
- Died: February 14, 2012 (aged 82)
- Spouse: Tom Miller (m. 1949)

Eleanor Joan 'Dusty' Miller, OOnt (August 3, 1929 – February 14, 2012) was a Canadian politician who served as the first female mayor of Thunder Bay, Ontario from 1978 until the end of 1980 when she was defeated. Miller was married to Lakehead University history professor Tom Miller. The couple was very active in the university community, and they along with other community members pushed for the school to offer degrees. Before her political activity, she was active in community theater. She is a member of the Order of Ontario. She died on February 14, 2012.

== Early life ==
Miller was born on August 3, 1929, to parents William and Katherine Faircloth in Fort William Ontario. She was the eldest of seven children. Miller attended Peterborough Normal School for teacher training and taught in Port Hope Ontario for two years. In 1949 she married Tom Miller, and the couple moved to London England. They moved so Tom could attend the London School of Economics for the completion of his doctorate in history. Dusty Miller during this time worked as a school teacher at later at Canada House as a receptionist.

They returned to the Thunder Bay region in 1954 and Miller became interested in the community's local theater scene. She became the artistic director of the Port Arthur Community Players (later the Cambrian Players) and held the position for nine years and directed many musicals and plays. Miller assisted Burton Lancaster in establishing Magnus Theater. She served as the theater's manager for the opening season in 1972–1973. She also taught theater in high schools and taught various fine arts courses at Lakehead University and Confederation College. Miller and her husband supported Lakehead University in becoming “a full-degree course university” in the first half of the 60's. She then received a bachelor's degree in philosophy in 1969 from Lakehead University and won the Chancellor's medal. From 1988 to 1998, Miller was on the Lakehead University Board of Governors. Miller was a founding member of the Lakehead Council for the Arts and Theater Ontario.

== Political career ==
Dusty Miller was elected as an Alderman in 1974. She served on multiple committees and was the chair of Thunder Bay's first Arts and Heritage committee. Miller was elected mayor in 1978 and served until 1980. She was the first female mayor after the amalgamation of Thunder Bay. After taking some time away from politics, she returned as a City Councillor in 1985 and served until 1991. Some of the projects Miller worked on during her political career include Marina Park, the Thunder Bay Community Auditorium, and the Neebing - McIntyre Floodway.

== Awards ==
- Lakehead University's Alumni Honour Award - 1990
- 125th Anniversary of Confederation Medal – 1992
- Community Auditorium President's Award – 1993
- City of Thunder Bay 25th Anniversary Silver Achievement Award – 1995
- Theatre Ontario's Maggie Bassett Award – 1998
- Northern Ontario Business Influential Woman – 2000
- The Order of Ontario - 2001
