= Fort William (federal electoral district) =

Former federal electoral district in Ontario, Canada

Ontario electoral district

Defunct federal electoral district
- Legislature: House of Commons
- District created: 1924
- District abolished: 1976
- First contested: 1925
- Last contested: 1974

Fort William was a federal electoral district represented in the House of Commons of Canada from the year 1925 to 1979. It was located in the province of Ontario. This riding was created in 1924 from parts of Fort William and Rainy River riding.

It was initially defined to consist of the southern parts of the territorial districts of Rainy River, Kenora and Thunder Bay adjacent to the southern boundary of Canada.

In 1947, it was defined to consist of the city of Fort William and the southern parts of the territorial districts of Rainy River, Kenora and Thunder Bay adjacent to by the southern boundary of Canada.

In 1966, it was defined to consist of the City of Fort William and the Townships of Aldina, Blake, Crooks, Devon, Fraleigh, Gillies, Hartington, Lismore, Lybster, Marks, Neebing, O'Connor, Paipoonge, Pardee, Pearson, Scoble and Strange in the territorial district of Thunder Bay.

The electoral district was abolished in 1976 when it was merged into Thunder Bay—Atikokan riding.

== History ==
=== S.C. 1924, c.63 ===
Consisting of those parts of the territorial districts of Rainy River, Kenora and Thunder Bay bounded on the south by the southern boundary of Canada, and on the west, north and east by a line described as commencing on the said southern boundary at the intersection of the fifth meridian passing between the townships of Melgund and Revell; thence north along the said meridian to a point five miles north of the Canadian Pacific Railway; thence southeast parallel to and at a distance of five miles northerly from the said line of railway to a point five miles due north of the station of Poland, south to the said railway and continuing along the same to the intersection of the projection westerly to the north boundary of the township of Forbes; thence along the north and east boundaries of the said township, the north and east boundaries of the townships of Conmee and Oliver, and the north boundary of the townships of Paipoonge and Neebing, and their projection easterly to the eighty-ninth meridian; thence along the said meridian to the southern boundary of Canada.

=== S.C. 1933, c.54 ===
Consisting of those parts of the territorial districts of Rainy River, Kenora and Thunder Bay bounded on the south by the southern boundary of Canada, on the west by the Fourth Meridan and on the north and east by a line described as commencing at a point on the said Fourth Meridian five miles north of the Canadian Pacific Railway; thence southeast parallel to and at a distance of five miles northerly from the said line of railway to a point five miles due north of the station of Poland; thence south to the said railway and continuing along the said railway to the intersection of the north boundary of the township of Goldie; thence along the north boundaries of the townships of Goldie and Forbes; thence south along the east boundaries of the townships of Forbes and Conmee; thence east and south along the north and east boundaries respectively of the township of Oliver; thence along the north boundaries of the townships of Paipoonge and Neebing and their projection easterly to the Eighty-ninth Meridian; thence south along the said meridian to the southern boundary of Canada.

=== S.C. 1947, c.71 ===
Consisting of the city of Fort William and of those parts of the territorial districts of Rainy River, Kenora and Thunder Bay bounded on the south by the southern boundary of Canada; on the west by the Fourth Meridian; (excluding Atikokan Improvement District) and on the north and east by a line described as commencing at a point on the said Fourth Meridian five miles north of the Canadian Pacific Railway; thence southeast parallel to and at a distance of five miles northerly from the said line of railway to a point five miles due north of the former station of Poland, which was situated approximately at the intersection of the said railway line with the north boundary of the township of Fallis, five and one half miles westerly from Argon station; thence south to the said railway and continuing along the said railway to the intersection of the north boundary of the township of Goldie; thence along the north boundaries of the townships of Goldie and Forbes; thence south along the east boundaries of the townships of Forbes and Conmee; thence east and south along the north and east boundaries respectively of the township of Oliver; thence along the north boundaries of the townships of Paipoonge and Neebing and their prolongation easterly to the Eighty-ninth Meridian of west longitude; thence south along the said Meridian to the southern boundary of Canada.

=== S.C. 1952, c.48 ===
Consisting of the city of Fort William and of those parts of the territorial districts of Rainy River, Kenora and Thunder Bay bounded on the south by the southern boundary of Canada; on the west by the Fourth Meridian; (excluding Atikokan Improvement District) and on the north and east by a line described as commencing at a point on the said Fourth Meridian five miles north of the Canadian Pacific Railway; thence southeast parallel to and at a distance of five miles northerly from the said line of railway to a point five miles due north of the former station of Poland, which was situated approximately at the intersection of the said railway line with the north boundary of the township of Fallis, five and one half miles westerly from Argon station; thence south to the said railway and continuing along the said railway to the intersection of the north boundary of the township of Goldie; thence along the north boundaries of the townships of Goldie and Forbes; thence south along the east boundaries of the townships of Forbes and Conmee; thence east and south along the north and east boundaries respectively of the township of Oliver; thence along the north boundaries of the townships of Paipoonge and Neebing and their prolongation easterly to the Eighty-ninth Meridian of west longitude; thence south along the said Meridian to the southern boundary of Canada.

=== Representation Order, 1966 ===
Consisting of that part of the territorial district of Thunder Bay contained in the City of Fort William and the Townships of Aldina, Blake, Crooks, Devon, Fraleigh, Gillies, Hartington, Lismore, Lybster, Marks, Neebing, O'Connor, Paipoonge, Pardee, Pearson, Scoble and Strange.

== Members of Parliament ==
This riding has elected the following members of Parliament:

| Parliament | Years | Member | Party |
|---|---|---|---|
Riding created from Fort William and Rainy River
| 15th | 1925–1926 | Robert James Manion | Conservative |
| 16th | 1926–1930 | Robert James Manion | Conservative |
| 17th | 1930–1930 | Robert James Manion | Conservative |
| 17th | 1930–1935 | Robert James Manion | Conservative |
| 18th | 1935–1940 | Dan McIvor | Liberal |
| 19th | 1940–1945 | Dan McIvor | Liberal |
| 20th | 1945–1949 | Dan McIvor | Liberal |
| 21st | 1949–1953 | Dan McIvor | Liberal |
| 22nd | 1953–1957 | Dan McIvor | Liberal |
| 23rd | 1957–1958 | Dan McIvor | Liberal |
| 24th | 1958–1962 | Hubert Badanai | Liberal |
| 25th | 1962–1963 | Hubert Badanai | Liberal |
| 26th | 1963–1965 | Hubert Badanai | Liberal |
| 27th | 1965–1968 | Hubert Badanai | Liberal |
| 28th | 1968–1972 | Hubert Badanai | Liberal |
| 29th | 1972–1974 | Paul McRae | Liberal |
| 30th | 1974–1979 | Paul McRae | Liberal |
Riding dissolved into Thunder Bay—Atikokan

== Election results ==
1925 Canadian federal election
| Party | Candidate | Votes |
|---|---|---|
| Conservative | Hon. Robert James Manion | 6,205 |
| Liberal | DeWitt Clinton Garver | 2,830 |

1926 Canadian federal election
| Party | Candidate | Votes |
|---|---|---|
| Conservative | Hon. Robert James Manion | 5,173 |
| Labour | William Nassau Welsh | 2,440 |

1930 Canadian federal election
| Party | Candidate | Votes |
|---|---|---|
| Conservative | Hon. Robert James Manion | 6,939 |
| Liberal | Charles White Wilson | 3,262 |
| Independent | Albert Edward Smith | 594 |

On Mr. Manion being named Minister of Railways and Canals, 7 August 1930:

Canadian federal by-election, 25 August 1930
| Party | Candidate | Votes |
|---|---|---|
| Conservative | Hon. Robert James Manion | acclaimed |

1935 Canadian federal election
| Party | Candidate | Votes |
|---|---|---|
| Liberal | Daniel McIvor | 5,481 |
| Conservative | Hon. Robert James Manion | 4,565 |
| Reconstruction | Clement Edward Chapple | 2,030 |
| Co-operative Commonwealth | Garfield Anderson | 1,635 |
| Independent | John Joseph Spooner | 78 |

1940 Canadian federal election
| Party | Candidate | Votes |
|---|---|---|
| Liberal | Daniel McIvor | 8,504 |
| National Government | Hon. Robert James Manion | 6,768 |
| Co-operative Commonwealth | Garfield Anderson | 1,778 |

1945 Canadian federal election
| Party | Candidate | Votes |
|---|---|---|
| Liberal | Daniel McIvor | 7,209 |
| Co-operative Commonwealth | Wilfred Carson McKenzie | 5,858 |
| Progressive Conservative | Robert Barclay Pow | 4,945 |
| Labor–Progressive | Donald Stewart | 772 |

1949 Canadian federal election
| Party | Candidate | Votes |
|---|---|---|
| Liberal | Daniel McIvor | 9,569 |
| Progressive Conservative | J. Mac Spence | 5,751 |
| Co-operative Commonwealth | Garfield Anderson | 4,830 |
| Labor–Progressive | Alvin L. Johnson | 746 |

1953 Canadian federal election
| Party | Candidate | Votes |
|---|---|---|
| Liberal | Daniel McIvor | 10,402 |
| Progressive Conservative | Murray Babe | 5,030 |
| Co-operative Commonwealth | William Johnson | 3,847 |
| Labor–Progressive | Naomi Mara Powell | 508 |

1957 Canadian federal election
| Party | Candidate | Votes |
|---|---|---|
| Liberal | Daniel McIvor | 8,552 |
| Progressive Conservative | Art Widnall | 7,926 |
| Co-operative Commonwealth | Michael Chicorli | 5,903 |

1958 Canadian federal election
| Party | Candidate | Votes |
|---|---|---|
| Liberal | Hubert Badanai | 9,915 |
| Progressive Conservative | Art Widnall | 9,798 |
| Co-operative Commonwealth | Michael Chicorli | 4,953 |
| Labor–Progressive | Bruce Magnuson | 224 |

1962 Canadian federal election
| Party | Candidate | Votes |
|---|---|---|
| Liberal | Hubert Badanai | 12,229 |
| Progressive Conservative | Bernard Black | |
| New Democratic | Edward G. Freeman | 5,713 |
| Social Credit | Arthur W. Hutton | 361 |

1963 Canadian federal election
| Party | Candidate | Votes |
|---|---|---|
| Liberal | Hubert Badanai | 11,765 |
| New Democratic | Edward G. Freeman | 7,619 |
| Progressive Conservative | Ben Devlin | 6,618 |
| Social Credit | Arthur W. Hutton | 309 |

1965 Canadian federal election
| Party | Candidate | Votes |
|---|---|---|
| Liberal | Hubert Badanai | 12,432 |
| New Democratic | Charles A. Grant | 8,993 |
| Progressive Conservative | Ben Devlin | 4,773 |

1968 Canadian federal election
| Party | Candidate | Votes |
|---|---|---|
| Liberal | Hubert Badanai | 10,635 |
| New Democratic | Charles A. Grant | 7,394 |
| Progressive Conservative | Lionel Hastings | 7,284 |

1972 Canadian federal election
| Party | Candidate | Votes |
|---|---|---|
| Liberal | Paul McRae | 11,545 |
| Progressive Conservative | Lionel Hastings | 10,263 |
| New Democratic | Ian Stewart | 7,497 |

1974 Canadian federal election
| Party | Candidate | Votes |
|---|---|---|
| Liberal | Paul McRae | 13,789 |
| New Democratic | Ty Kaipio | 8,094 |
| Progressive Conservative | Lawrence Timko | 6,129 |
| Communist | Bruce Barrett | 149 |
| Marxist–Leninist | Dianne Robinson | 72 |

== See also ==
- List of Canadian electoral districts
- Historical federal electoral districts of Canada
