= Saul Laskin =

Canadian politician (1918–2008)

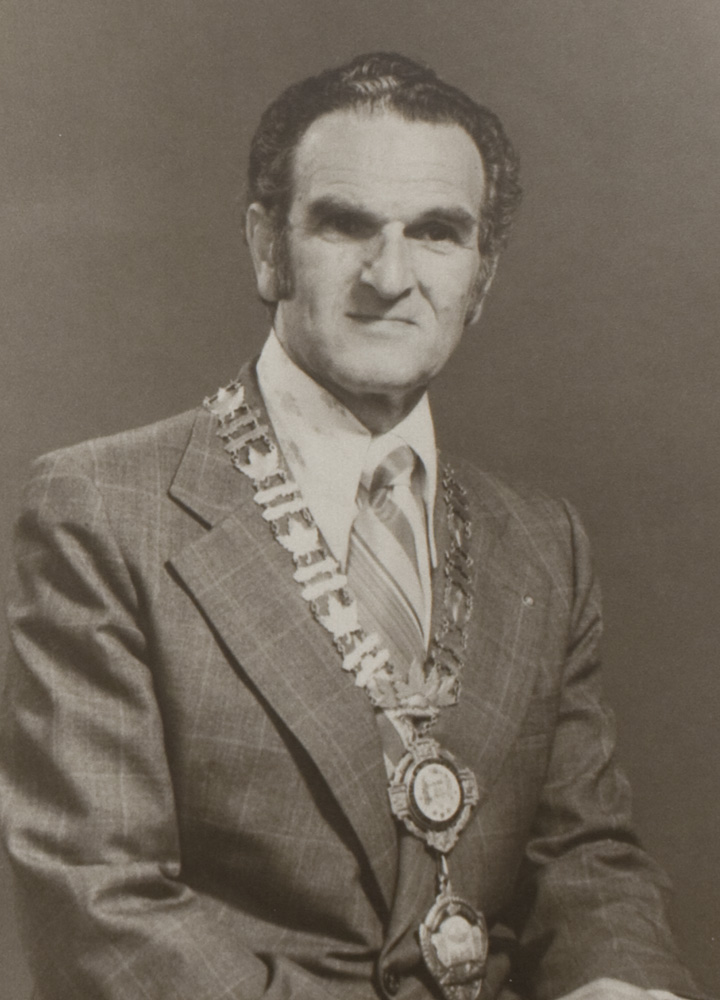

1st Mayor of Thunder Bay
- In office 1970–1972
- Succeeded by: Walter Assef

Personal details
- Born: 15 May 1918 Fort William, Ontario, Canada
- Died: 4 October 2008 (aged 90) Toronto, Ontario, Canada
- Resting place: Holy Blossom Memorial Park
- Party: Liberal Party of Canada
- Spouse: Adele Tritt
- Relations: Bora Laskin (brother)

Saul Laskin (15 May 1918 – 4 October 2008) was a Canadian politician. He was the first mayor of Thunder Bay, Ontario.

== Biography ==
Born in Fort William, Ontario, he was the younger brother of jurist Bora Laskin. He was educated in Fort William and Toronto, and served overseas in World War II. In 1938, he took over his father's furniture store and opened a new store in Port Arthur in 1946, which he operated until the 1980s when he moved to Toronto with his wife Adele.

His political career began in 1959 when he was elected as an alderman in Port Arthur. He was elected mayor in 1962, a position he would hold until 1969, when Port Arthur and Fort William amalgamated to become Thunder Bay. He was elected mayor of Thunder Bay, and held the position until 1972. Laskin was the first and only Jewish mayor elected at the Lakehead.

In 1963 federal election, he ran unsuccessfully as a Liberal in the riding of Port Arthur, losing to the New Democratic Party candidate, Douglas Fisher.

Laskin sat on the board of governors at Lakehead University for 15 years, and received an honorary doctorate and the title of Fellow of Lakehead University. In retirement, he lived in Toronto with his wife Adele Tritt whom he married in 1946. He died of a heart attack on 4 October 2008.
