= Paul McRae =

Canadian politician

Member of Parliament for Fort William
- In office 1972–1979
- Preceded by: Hubert Badanai
- Succeeded by: riding dissolved

Member of Parliament for Thunder Bay—Atikokan
- In office 1979–1984
- Preceded by: riding created
- Succeeded by: Iain Angus

Personal details
- Born: 20 October 1924 Toronto, Ontario, Canada
- Died: 3 November 1992 (aged 68)
- Party: Liberal; Independent Liberal
- Profession: School principal

Paul Edmund McRae (20 October 1924 – 3 November 1992) was a Liberal party member of the House of Commons of Canada. He was born in Toronto, Ontario and became a school principal by career.

He represented Ontario's Fort William electoral district since winning that seat in the 1972 federal election. He was re-elected in 1974, 1979 and 1980. Due to riding boundary changes, McRae represented Thunder Bay—Atikokan since 1976.

McRae left national politics in 1984 and did not campaign in that year's federal election.

On 9 July 1984 he was appointed as a full-time member of the Canadian Radio-television and Telecommunications Commission (CRTC) by the Federal government, and continued in this role until at least 1991.

McRae died on 3 November 1992.
