= Stan Dromisky =

Canadian politician (1931–2023)

Member of Parliament for Thunder Bay—Atikokan
- In office 1993–2004
- Preceded by: Iain Angus
- Succeeded by: Ken Boshcoff

Personal details
- Born: 25 June 1931 Fort William, Ontario, Canada
- Died: 8 September 2023 (aged 92) Thunder Bay, Ontario, Canada
- Party: Liberal
- Profession: Professor, Art Gallery Director

Stanley Peter Dromisky (25 June 1931 – 8 September 2023) was a Canadian politician who was a Liberal party member of the House of Commons of Canada from 1993 to 2004. By career, he was a professor and a director of the Thunder Bay Art Gallery.

Born in Fort William, Ontario, Dromisky first attempted to enter Parliament for the Thunder Bay—Atikokan electoral district during the 1988 federal election but lost to incumbent NDP candidate Iain Angus. He defeated Angus in the riding in the 1993 election and was re-elected in 1997 and 2000. Dromisky served in the 35th, 36th, and 37th Canadian Parliaments.

Dromisky retired from politics in 2004. He died on 8 September 2023, at the age of 92.

== Education ==
- Teaching Certificate: Canadore College
- Bachelor of Arts: University of Western Ontario
- Bachelor of Education (BEd): University of Toronto
- Master of Education (MEd): University of Wisconsin–Superior
- Doctor of Philosophy (PhD): University of Florida

== Electoral record ==
2000 Canadian federal election: Thunder Bay—Atikokan
Party	Candidate	Votes	%
Liberal	Stan Dromisky	11,449	37.0%
Alliance	David Richard Leskowski	9,067	29.3%
New Democratic	Rick Baker	6,023	19.5%
Progressive Conservative	Ian M. Sinclair	3,652	11.8%
Green	Kristin Boyer	769	2.5%

1997 Canadian federal election: Thunder Bay—Atikokan
Party	Candidate	Votes	%
Liberal	Stan Dromisky	14,287	42.7%
New Democratic	Jack Drewes	8,117	24.2%
Reform	Sandy Smith	5,642	16.8%
Progressive Conservative	Rick Potter	5,443	16.3%

1993 Canadian federal election: Thunder Bay—Atikokan
Party	Candidate	Votes	%
Liberal	Stan Dromisky	19,947	57.4%
New Democratic	Iain Angus	6,555	18.9%
Reform	Colyne Gibbons	5,380	15.5%
Progressive Conservative	Tony Stehmann	2,836	8.2%

1988 Canadian federal election: Thunder Bay—Atikokan
Party	Candidate	Votes	%
New Democratic	Iain Angus	13,132	35.9%
Liberal	Stan Dromisky	11,968	32.7%
Progressive Conservative	Ken Boshcoff	11,454	31.3%
Communist	Paul Pugh	75	0.2%
