= Magnus Theatre =

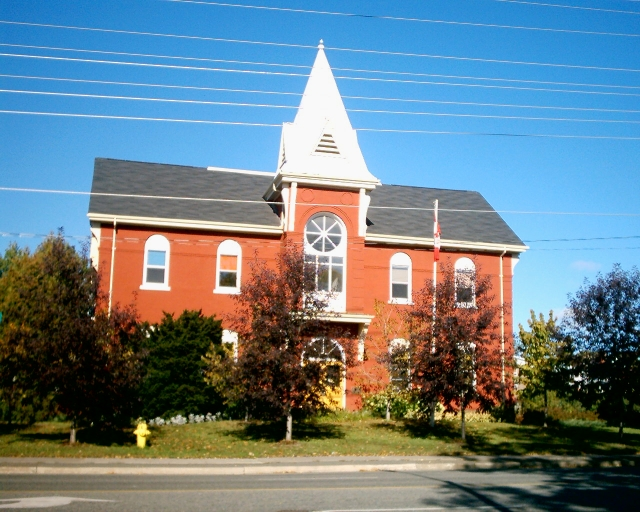
- Magnus Theatre in the renovated Port Arthur Central Schoolhouse (1884)
- Interactive map of Magnus Theatre
- Address: 10 South Algoma Street; Thunder Bay, Ontario; Canada
- Coordinates: 48.43695°N 89.22472°W
- Public transit: Thunder Bay Transit; 3C 3J 3M 9 11 13

Website
- http://www.magnustheatre.com

The Magnus Theatre - The Dr. S. Penny Petrone Centre for the Performing Arts in Thunder Bay, Ontario was founded in 1971 and is Northwestern Ontario's professional theatre company.

== History ==
Founded by British director Burton Lancaster, who had the idea to create a new theatre company with the help of Dusty Miller (the first Chair of the Arts and Heritage Committee of Thunder Bay, and former Mayor of Thunder Bay), and Carol Bell, (a former Hillcrest High School drama teacher), a citizen's coalition was formed.

The original building was across from the Slovakian Hall in the famous East End of Fort William, now Thunder Bay. Although it was small and run-down, it had charm, enough space to house the stage and the essential facilities and it was available for rent. Eventually, Lancaster transformed this small hall at 639 McLaughlin Street into the full-fledged professional theatre company that Magnus has become.

By 1977, it had become the only professional theatre company between Winnipeg and Sudbury, and it was supported by the Canada Council, Ontario Arts Council, the City of Thunder Bay, local businesses, and theatre patrons.

Building upon Lancaster's initial vision, each successive Artistic Director has taken the Magnus reigns and strengthened the theatre's local and national profile. From 1977 to 1982, Tibor Feheregyhazi created a community-focused company and built the local audience base for mainstage productions. Following Tibor, Brian Richmond took over from 1982 to 1987 and established a high national profile for Magnus by producing new Canadian plays. Other theatres subsequently produced many of these plays across the country, firmly placing Magnus on the Canadian professional theatre map. In 1987, Michael McLaughlin took over and shifted the focus back to the community as he further established the local audience base. McLaughlin also initiated the successful Theatre in Education program to further develop the strong ties that Magnus and the community share. From 1992 to 2016, Mario Crudo placed his focus on the following areas: strengthening and broadening ties with the community, partnerships, generating new interest in mainstage productions, advancing new play development, and solidifying adult regional touring and other outreach programs. Thom Currie is the current Artistic Director of Magnus Theatre.

Magnus inaugurated its 2001-2002 30th Anniversary Season in a newly built theatre attached to the historic Central School House, which houses Magnus' administrative offices, in the Waverley Park heritage district. Central School was the first school in the City of Port Arthur. In 1884, 2 acres (8,100 m^{2}) of Waverley Park land were granted by the Crown to the Public School Trustees and the original structure was built. The renovation of the school also included the preservation and enhancement of the Waverley Park Heritage Conservation District and Magnus Theatre was renamed in honor of one of their generous patrons, Dr. S. Penny Petrone Centre for the Performing Arts.

In 1998, Magnus received the Lieutenant Governor's Award for the Arts from the Ontario Arts Council Foundation. The award recognized the Organization's exceptional private sector and community support. This award certainly justified the dedicated work of the Organization's management and Board to supplementing the Company's operating support through innovative sponsorship initiatives and other fundraising campaigns.

As of 2025, renovations to the schoolhouse portion of Magnus Theatre to create a new studio theatre have been completed.
