= Tibor Feheregyhazi =

Hungarian-Canadian actor (1932–2007)

Tibor Feheregyhazi, CM (February 14, 1932, Budapest – July 10, 2007, Saskatoon, Saskatchewan) was a Hungarian-Canadian actor and director. He attended the National Theatre School in Montreal, Quebec. Feheregyhazi went on to become a resident director at the Manitoba Theatre Centre in Winnipeg, Manitoba, as well as artistic director of Magnus Theatre in Thunder Bay, Ontario and lastly, artistic director of the Persephone Theatre in Saskatoon, Saskatchewan.

== Background ==
Tibor Feheregyhazi grew up in Budapest. Feheregyhazi's parents worked for the Hungarian National Radio. His mother was executive producer of music programming and his father was an economic journalist. When Feheregyhazi was 4 years old, he had his first radio performance at the station where his parents were employed. He attended a private Jesuit school in Danube before switching to a public high school. He enrolled at the National Hungarian Film and Theatre Academy and acted on stage and radio while at school. He graduated from high school in 1956.

In 1956, Feheregyhazi was one of thousands of young Hungarians who fought in the Hungarian Revolution, which failure forced him to flee Hungary, first to Italy and then to Canada. In 1957, Feheregyhazi went to Canada where he worked in a camera shop, cleaning floors in a hospital and also worked part-time in a theatre. After three years in Ottawa, he moved to Montreal and studied at the National Theatre School. After graduating, he was a stage manager for the Canadian Players Company in Toronto. In 1969, he joined the Royal Winnipeg Ballet as a production manager.

He then worked freelance before going to Thunder Bay in 1978 as an artistic director of the Magnus Theatre. Four years later, Feheregyhazi went to Saskatoon to join the Persephone Theatre. In 2004, he was made a member of the Order of Canada in recognition of his work at the Persephone. He celebrated the 50th anniversary of his arrival in Canada on July 1, 2007.

== Death ==
Tibor Feheregyhazi died on July 10, 2007, in Saskatoon at age 75, following a lengthy battle with prostate cancer. He was married twice and was survived by a wife and five children. Following his death, the City of Saskatoon named Feheregyhazi Boulevard in the Aspen Ridge neighbourhood in his honor.
