= Thunder Bay—Atikokan (federal electoral district) =

Former federal electoral district in Ontario, Canada

Coordinates: 48.86°N 90.04°W

Ontario electoral district

Defunct federal electoral district
- Legislature: House of Commons
- District created: 1976
- District abolished: 2003
- First contested: 1979
- Last contested: 2000

Thunder Bay—Atikokan was a federal electoral district in northwestern Ontario, Canada, that was represented in the House of Commons of Canada from 1979 to 2003 and in the Legislative Assembly of Ontario from 1999 to 2007. The federal riding was created in 1976, from parts of Fort William and Thunder Bay ridings. It became a provincial riding in 1999.

It initially consisted of the part of the Territorial District of Rainy River east of the 4th Meridian, including the whole of the Township of Atikokan; and the southwest part of the Territorial District of Thunder Bay, including the southern part of the city of Thunder Bay, Ontario.

The electoral district was abolished in 2003 when it was redistributed between Thunder Bay—Rainy River and Thunder Bay—Superior North ridings.

== Members of Parliament ==
This riding has elected the following members of Parliament:

Parliament	Years	Member	Party
Riding created from Fort William and Thunder Bay
31st	1979–1980	Paul McRae	Liberal
32nd	1980–1984	Paul McRae	Liberal
33rd	1984–1988	Iain Angus	New Democratic
34th	1988–1993	Iain Angus	New Democratic
35th	1993–1997	Stan Dromisky	Liberal
36th	1997–2000	Stan Dromisky	Liberal
37th	2000–2004	Stan Dromisky	Liberal
Riding dissolved into Thunder Bay—Rainy River and Thunder Bay—Superior North

== Election results ==
1979 Canadian federal election: Thunder Bay—Atikokan
Party	Candidate	Votes	%
Liberal	Paul McRae	11,921	34.9%
New Democratic	Iain Angus	11,667	34.1%
Progressive Conservative	Ken Moffatt	10,392	30.4%
Libertarian	Nora Ronis	92	0.3%
Communist	Walter E. Rogers	84	0.2%
Marxist–Leninist	Doris Stevens	29	0.1%

1980 Canadian federal election: Thunder Bay—Atikokan
Party	Candidate	Votes	%
Liberal	Paul McRae	13,234	39.2%
New Democratic	Iain Angus	13,150	39.0%
Progressive Conservative	Ken Moffat	7,225	21.4%
Libertarian	Nora Ronis	87	0.3%
Marxist–Leninist	Dianne Robinson	35	0.1%

1984 Canadian federal election: Thunder Bay—Atikokan
Party	Candidate	Votes	%
New Democratic	Iain Angus	14,715	41.5%
Progressive Conservative	Ken Boshcoff	12,040	34.0%
Liberal	Dale Willoughby	8,704	24.5%

1988 Canadian federal election: Thunder Bay—Atikokan
Party	Candidate	Votes	%
New Democratic	Iain Angus	13,132	35.9%
Liberal	Stan Dromisky	11,968	32.7%
Progressive Conservative	Ken Boshcoff	11,454	31.3%
Communist	Paul Pugh	75	0.2%

1993 Canadian federal election: Thunder Bay—Atikokan
Party	Candidate	Votes	%
Liberal	Stan Dromisky	19,947	57.4%
New Democratic	Iain Angus	6,555	18.9%
Reform	Colyne Gibbons	5,380	15.5%
Progressive Conservative	Tony Stehmann	2,836	8.2%

1997 Canadian federal election: Thunder Bay—Atikokan
Party	Candidate	Votes	%	±%
Liberal	Stan Dromisky	14,287	42.7%	-14.7%
New Democratic	Jack Drewes	8,117	24.2%	+5.3%
Reform	Sandy Smith	5,642	16.8%	1.3%
Progressive Conservative	Rick Potter	5,443	16.3%	+8.1%
Total valid votes		33,489	100.0	
Total rejected ballots		337	1.0%	
Turnout		33,886	60.2%	
Eligible voters		56,257		
Liberal hold		Swing		

2000 Canadian federal election: Thunder Bay—Atikokan
Party	Candidate	Votes	%	±%
Liberal	Stan Dromisky	11,449	37.0%	-5.7%
Alliance	David Richard Leskowski	9,067	29.3%	+12.7%
New Democratic	Rick Baker	6,023	19.5%	-4.7%
Progressive Conservative	Ian M. Sinclair	3,652	11.8%	-4.5%
Green	Kristin Boyer	769	2.5%	-
Total valid votes		30,960	100.0	
Total rejected ballots		154	0.5%	-0.5%
Turnout		31,114	55.7%	-4.5%
Eligible voters		55,889		
Liberal hold		Swing		

== See also ==
- List of Canadian electoral districts
- Historical federal electoral districts of Canada
