= Dan McIvor (politician) =

Canadian politician (1873–1965)

Member of Parliament for Fort William
- In office October 1935 – February 1958
- Preceded by: Robert James Manion
- Succeeded by: Hubert Badanai

Personal details
- Born: Daniel McIvor; 14 February 1873 Lurgy, County Tyrone, Ireland
- Died: 2 September 1965 (aged 92) Fort William, Ontario, Canada
- Party: Liberal
- Spouse: Gertrude Bissett (m. 1908)
- Profession: Christian minister

Daniel McIvor (14 February 1873 – 2 September 1965) was a Liberal party member of the House of Commons of Canada. He was born in Lurgy, County Tyrone, Ireland. He was the father of Canadian aviator Dan McIvor.

McIvor graduated from Manitoba College in 1905 and became a Presbyterian then United Church of Canada minister. McIvor married Gertrude Margaret Bissett (30 December 1908). After preaching in various congregations in Manitoba, he was appointed to Fort William, Ontario in 1926.

He was first elected at the Fort William riding in the 1935 general election. McIvor was re-elected to successive terms in Parliament there in 1940, 1945, 1949, 1953 and 1957. He supported a national old age pension system since introducing a 1937 Parliamentary resolution. After completing his final term, the 23rd Canadian Parliament, McIvor retired from federal politics and did not stand for re-election in 1958.

McIvor died aged 92 at Fort William in 1965, where he remained after leaving his political career. John Diefenbaker, then leader of the opposition Progressive Conservatives, noted that McIvor "was the most beloved member that the House of Commons has known in my time. He was a friend of the sick, of the afflicted and the underdog. He lived to serve others."
