= Ken Boshcoff =

Canadian politician

6th Mayor of Thunder Bay
- In office November 15, 2022 – November 15, 2026
- Preceded by: Bill Mauro
- Succeeded by: Moe Comuzzi
- In office 1997–2003
- Preceded by: David Hamilton
- Succeeded by: Lynn Peterson

Member of Parliament for Thunder Bay—Rainy River
- In office June 28, 2004 – October 14, 2008
- Preceded by: Stan Dromisky
- Succeeded by: John Rafferty

Personal details
- Born: June 20, 1949 (age 77) Fort William, Ontario, Canada
- Party: Independent
- Other political affiliations: Liberal
- Profession: Insurance executive; marketing manager

Kenneth Boshcoff (born June 20, 1949) is a Canadian politician who served as the mayor of Thunder Bay from 2022 to 2026. He previously served as mayor from 1997 to 2003. Boshcoff also served as a member of Parliament for Thunder Bay—Rainy River from 2004 to 2008.

== Early life ==
Boshcoff was born in Fort William and was raised in Westfort by parents of Ukrainian/Polish and Bulgarian descent. He attended Crawford, St. Ann, St. Patrick, and Westgate schools. Boshcoff then studied at Lakehead University as an undergraduate, where he received degrees in Economics and Political Science in 1972. In 1975, he graduated from York University with a Master’s Degree in Environmental Studies.

As a teenager, he began an office-cleaning company and then worked a series of part-time jobs until completing his degrees.

Mr. Boshcoff obtained work in the Provincial and National Parks systems to pay for his tuition and developed his environmental skills in Quetico, Pukaskwa, Gros Morne, Terra Nova, and the St. Lawrence Islands.

He later worked for the Federal Government as the District Planner for Indian and Northern Affairs. After that he joined the family insurance business, moving to the Thunder Bay Port Authority as their Director of Marketing. Later, with his brother, he formed a new company "Boshcoff & Associates" until becoming Mayor.

== Political Career ==
=== First stint at city hall ===
Boshcoff was first elected as an alderman of Thunder Bay in 1979 and served (as councillor in later terms) until 1997.

He was elected mayor in the 1997 and the 2000 municipal elections.

He started his political career as a conservative partisan. In the 1984 federal election that the Progressive Conservative Party led by Brian Mulroney won a landslide victory, Boschoff carried the Progressive Conservative banner in Thunder Bay—Atikokan, coming in second with 34% of the votes. He contested the seat again in 1988 and fell to third place. He attended the January 1985 Ontario Progressive Conservative leadership convention as a supporter of runner-up Larry Grossman.

=== Two terms as MP ===
After six years as mayor, Boshcoff in 2004 contested the federal seat, by then redistributed as Thunder Bay—Rainy River, as the candidate for the Paul Martin led Liberals. The 2004 contest was the first of four contests Boshcoff faced off NDP candidate and later MP John Rafferty. Boshcoff retained the seat for the Liberals, beating Rafferty by a five-point margin. During debate on Bill C-38, the Civil Marriage Act, Boshcoff was one of a minority of Liberal MPs who broke with the government to vote against legalizing same-sex marriage. On April 12, 2005, he voted in favour of an amendment proposed by then-Opposition Leader Stephen Harper that would have stopped the bill from advancing and preserved the "traditional" definition of marriage. Following the defeat of the Harper amendment, Boshcoff voted against the bill on the second and third readings.

He was re-elected in 2006 by a reduced margin of less than two points as the Liberals government was ousted by the Conservative.

In the subsequent federal Liberal leadership contest, Boshcoff was one of four MPs who supported Ken Dryden's bid, and moved with Dryden to Bob Rae upon Dryden's elimination at the conclusion of second ballot.

In 2008, Boshcoff finally succumbed to Rafferty's third challenge, losing to him by an eight-point margin. Boshcoff sought a comeback in 2011, but came in a distant behind a niece of long-time MP Joe Comuzzi who stood for the Conservative party. Following his defeat, Boshcoff returned to the business world as a business and government relations consultant and corporate governance advisor.

=== Second city hall tenure ===
Between his federal defeats in 2008 and 2011, Boshcoff staged a successful bid to return to Thurder Bay City Council in 2010, joining his erstwhile rival from federal bid in the 1980s, former NDP MP Iain Angus in securing one of the five at-large seats.

In 2014, he challenged incumbent mayor Keith Hobbs in the 2014 municipal election, losing to Hobbs by a six-and-a-half-point margin.

=== Third city hall tenure ===
In 2022, four decades after he was first elected an alderman, Boshcoff sought the mayoralty again when incumbent mayor and former provincial minister Bill Mauro opted to stand down after one term. He edged out political newcomer Gary Mack in a competitive contest with a four-point margin.

== Electoral record ==
=== Municipal ===
2022 Thunder Bay Mayoral Election
Candidate	Vote	%
Ken Boshcoff	13,538	38.22%
Gary Mack	12,145	34.29%
Peng You	6,377	18.00%
Clinton Harris	2,728	7.70%
Robert Szczepanski	633	1.79%
Total	35,421	100.00

2014 Thunder Bay Mayoral Election
Candidate	Vote	%
Keith Hobbs	14,463	38.96%
Ken Boshcoff	12,051	32.46%
Shane Judge	9,531	25.67%
Colin Burridge	412	1.11%
Douglas David Mackay	362	0.98%
Henry Wojak	304	0.82%
Total	37,123	100.00

2010 Thunder Bay Councillor At Large Election
Candidate	Vote	%
Ken Boshcoff - Elected	22,516	14.62%
Larry Hebert - Elected	18,477	11.99%
Iain Angus - Elected	15,744	10.24%
Rebecca Johnson - Elected	14,201	9.22%
Aldo Ruberto - Elected	13,396	8.70%
Lawrence Timko	12,650	8.21%
Norm Staal	11,088	7.20%
Gerald Graham	7,744	5.02%
Beatrice Metzler	7,603	4.93%
Dick Waddington	6,113	3.97%
Darren Roberts	4,660	3.02%
Cindy Crowe	3,706	2.40%
Sharon Ostberg	3,631	2.35%
House Richard Moorey	3,238	2.10%
Norman Sponchia	3,082	2.00%
Tyler Woods	2,967	1.92%
Sydney Pettit	1,256	0.81%
Iqbal Khan	1,225	0.79%
Marvin Robert McMenemy	650	0.42%
Total	153,977	100.00

=== Federal ===
2011 Canadian federal election: Thunder Bay—Rainy River
Party	Candidate	Votes	%
New Democratic	John Rafferty	18,085	48.7%
Conservative	Maureen Comuzzi-Stehmann	10,097	27.2%
Liberal	Ken Boshcoff	8,067	21.7%
Green	Ed Shields	909	2.4%
Total valid votes		37,158	100.0
Total rejected ballots		130	0.3%
Turnout		37,288	60.1%
Eligible voters		62,018	

2008 Canadian federal election: Thunder Bay—Rainy River
Party	Candidate	Votes	%
New Democratic	John Rafferty	14,478	40.3%
Liberal	Ken Boshcoff	11,589	32.3%
Conservative	Richard Neumann	8,466	23.6%
Green	Russ Aegard	1,377	3.8%
Total valid votes		35,910	100.0
Total rejected ballots		105	0.3%
Turnout		36,015	57.05%
Eligible voters		63,128	

2006 Canadian federal election: Thunder Bay—Rainy River
Party	Candidate	Votes	%
Liberal	Ken Boshcoff	13,520	35.1%
New Democratic	John Rafferty	12,862	33.4%
Conservative	David Leskowski	10,485	27.2%
Green	Russ Aegard	1,193	3.1%
Marijuana	Doug MacKay	424	1.1%
Total valid votes		38,484	100.0
Total rejected ballots		134	0.4%
Turnout		36,618	57.96%
Eligible voters		63,180	

2004 Canadian federal election: Thunder Bay—Rainy River
Party	Candidate	Votes	%
Liberal	Ken Boshcoff	14,290	39.4%
New Democratic	John Rafferty	10,781	29.7%
Conservative	David Leskowski	9,559	26.3%
Green	Russ Aegard	856	2.4%
Marijuana	Doug Thompson	547	1.5%
Christian Heritage	Johannes Scheibler	267	0.7%
Total valid votes		36,300	100.0
Total rejected ballots		162	0.4%
Turnout		36,462	57.22%
Eligible voters		63,718	

1988 Canadian federal election: Thunder Bay—Atikokan
Party	Candidate	Votes	%
New Democratic	Iain Angus	13,132	35.9%
Liberal	Stan Dromisky	11,968	32.7%
Progressive Conservative	Ken Boshcoff	11,454	31.3%
Communist	Paul Pugh	75	0.2%
Total valid votes		36,629	100.0

1984 Canadian federal election: Thunder Bay—Atikokan
Party	Candidate	Votes	%
New Democratic	Iain Angus	14,715	41.5%
Progressive Conservative	Ken Boshcoff	12,040	34.0%
Liberal	Dale Willoughby	8,704	24.5%
Total valid votes		35,459	100.0
