= Canadian Federation of University Women =

- Abbreviation: CFUW
- Formation: 1919
- Type: Women's educational organizations in Canada
- Legal status: active
- Purpose: advocate and public voice, educator and network
- Headquarters: Ottawa, Ontario, Canada
- Region served: Canada
- Official language: English, French
- Website: www.cfuw.org

The Canadian Federation of University Women (CFUW) (French: Fédération canadienne des femmes diplômées des universités [FCFDU]) (formerly called University Women’s Club) is a non-partisan, voluntary, self-funded organization with over 6,600 members and 94 Clubs, located in every province across Canada. Founded in 1919, CFUW works to improve the status of women by promoting public education, human rights, social justice, and peace. Every year, CFUW Clubs award over $1 million in scholarships to girls and women pursuing post-secondary studies. Clubs also provide lifelong learning opportunities and fellowship to its members, with hundreds of lecture series, book clubs, and interest groups. Members are involved in community-based activities and advocacy on a wide range of issues, including gender-based violence, early learning and child care, the environment, and women's health.

CFUW was “born out of the struggle by 19 and early 20th century women to gain admittance to Canadian universities," to support women’s learning and provide fellowship to the small number of university-educated women at the time. While a university degree was initially a requirement for membership, a degree is no longer required to be a member of a CFUW Club. The organization now operates under the acronym "CFUW" to remove focus from the word "university" and thus be more inclusive.

As CFUW President from 1964 to 1967, Laura Sabia led a coalition of 32 women's organizations across Canada demanding that the Government of Canada "pursue the human rights of women in Canada” by establishing a Royal Commission on the Status of Women. Sabia threatened a march of three million women on Ottawa if the Commission was not established.

CFUW is the largest affiliate of the Graduate Women International and holds special consultative status with the Economic and Social Council of the United Nations, as well as representation on the Sectoral Committee on Education for the Canadian Sub-Committee for UNESCO. CFUW regularly sends a delegation to the United Nations Commission on the Status of Women.

Among other activities, it supports the CFUW Charitable Trust, which awards fellowships for post-graduate education.

== Archives ==
There are Canadian Federation of University Women fonds at Library and Archives Canada. The archival reference number is R2770.
