= Catherine Seppala =

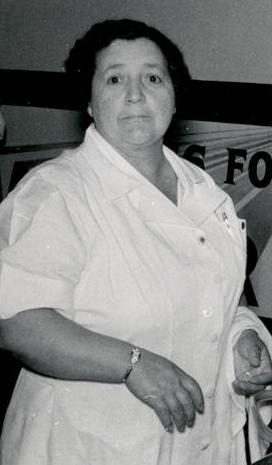
- Seppala in 1956

Mayor of Fort William, Ontario
- In office 1959 – 1960 (September)
- Preceded by: Hubert Badanai
- Succeeded by: John Oliver Booth

Personal details
- Born: 1907 Fort William, Ontario
- Died: July 4, 1975 (aged 67–68) Thunder Bay, Ontario

Catherine Seppala (1907 – July 4, 1975) was a politician in Ontario, Canada. She served as mayor of Fort William from 1959 to 1960, the first and only female mayor of the city before it became part of Thunder Bay.

She was born in Fort William. She served on Fort William city council from 1953 to 1958. During her time as mayor, the Neebing River Conservation project was initiated and the Westmount Hospital was built. Also during Seppala's term as mayor, she pressured a local bookseller to remove Lady Chatterley's Lover from his shelves (and more than 700 copies of the books were burned).

In January 1956, as chairman of the city carnival committee, Seppala banned bathing suits from the Fort William carnival queen contest in favour of skating skirts and sweaters.

Seppala was involved in a number of local volunteer organizations, including the Red Cross.

She resigned due to illness in September 1961. She died in Thunder Bay in 1975.
