= Joshua Dyke =

Canadian politician and minister

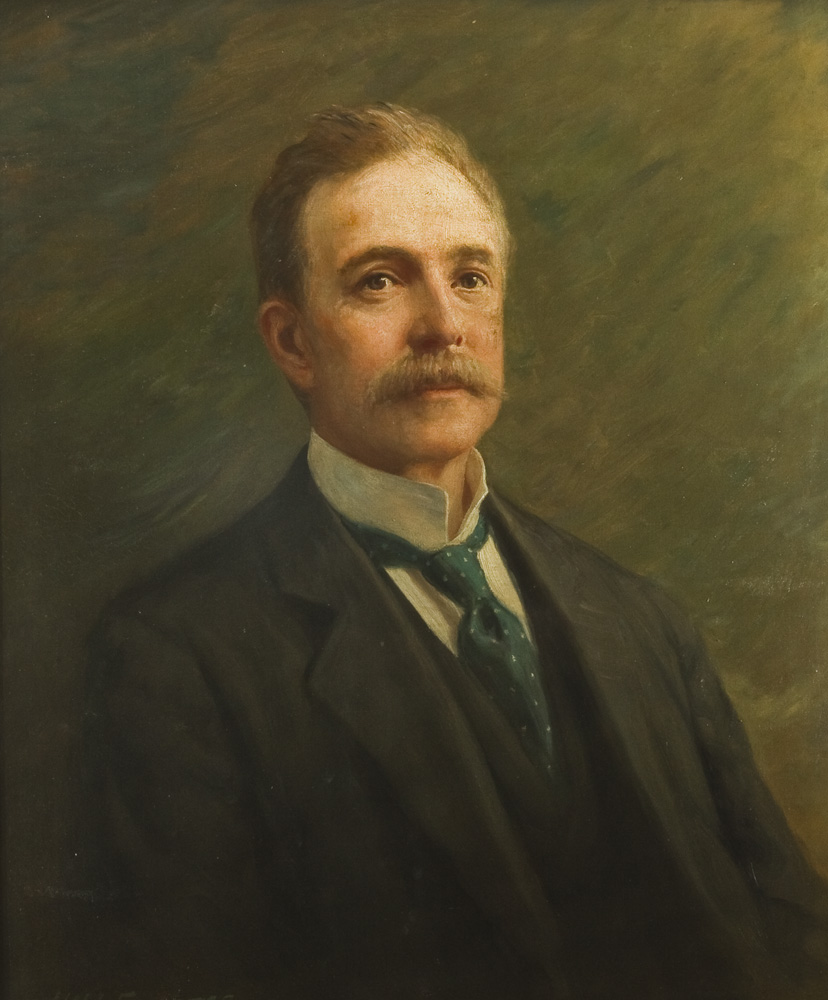
Painting of Dyke circa 1903

Reverend Joshua Dyke (September 15, 1849 – August 11, 1934) was an English-born Methodist minister, business owner and politician in Ontario, Canada. He served as mayor of Fort William from 1902 to 1903.

He was born in Wednesfield, Staffordshire and came to Canada in 1871. Dyke founded Wesley Methodist Church (later Wesley United Church) in Fort William in 1890. After beginning to lose his voice, Dyke left his post as a minister and became involved in business. He was a real estate and insurance agent. He also owned the Dyke Block, a commercial building, in Fort William. Dyke supported a publicly funded streetcar system for Port Arthur and Fort William since private sources of funding were not interested in the project.

During his time as mayor, a municipal telephone system was established and Vickers Park was donated to the town. Also, the first Fort William town hall was destroyed by fire. Dyke submitted his name for the 1909 mayoral election but was forced to withdraw after he suffered a stroke.

Dyke died in Fort William at the age of 84.

His daughter Edith, one of the first women to practice law in Thunder Bay district, established the Joshua Dyke Family Scholarship in his honour.
