= Hubert Badanai =

Canadian politician

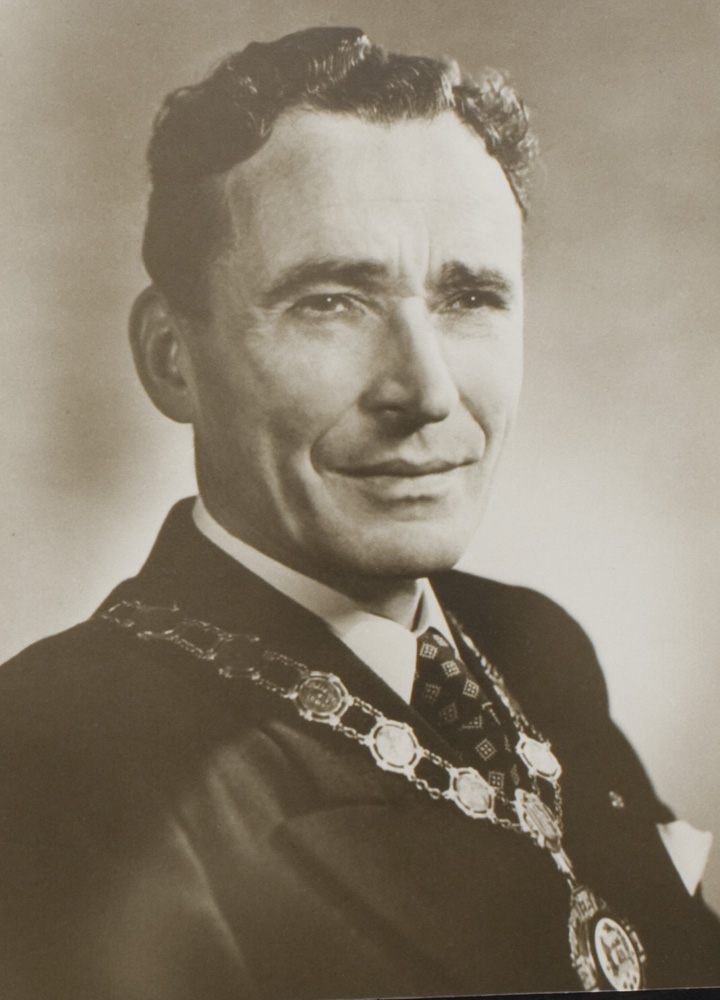
- Badanai in 1949

Member of Parliament for Fort William
- In office 31 March 1958 – 29 October 1972
- Preceded by: Daniel McIvor
- Succeeded by: Paul McRae

Mayor of Fort William, Ontario
- In office 1955–1958
- Preceded by: Edward Carson
- Succeeded by: Catherine Seppala
- In office 1949–1952
- Preceded by: Garfield Anderson
- Succeeded by: Edward Carson

Personal details
- Born: 11 January 1895 Azzano Decimo, Kingdom of Italy
- Died: 19 September 1986 (aged 91) Thunder Bay, Ontario, Canada
- Party: Liberal
- Occupation: Automobile dealer; manager

Hubert Badanai (11 January 11, 1895 – 19 September 1986), born Umberto Badanai; was a Canadian automobile dealer and politician. He was the first Italian born member of Canadian Federal Parliament.

Born in Azzano Decimo, Friuli-Venezia Giulia (northeastern Italy), to a Jewish-Italian Father and Italian Mother. He moved to Canada when he was 18 and worked at a brickyard in Rosslyn. He later opened a successful car dealership and became an alderman in Fort William, Ontario, for 9 years and mayor for 8 years. He was elected to the House of Commons of Canada for the riding of Fort William in the 1958 federal election. A Liberal, he was re-elected in 1962, 1963, 1965, and 1968. From 1963 to 1964, he was the Parliamentary Secretary to the Minister of Public Works. From 1964 to 1965, he was the Parliamentary Secretary to the Minister of Citizenship and Immigration.
