= Eunice Wishart =

Eunice Marian Wishart.jpg

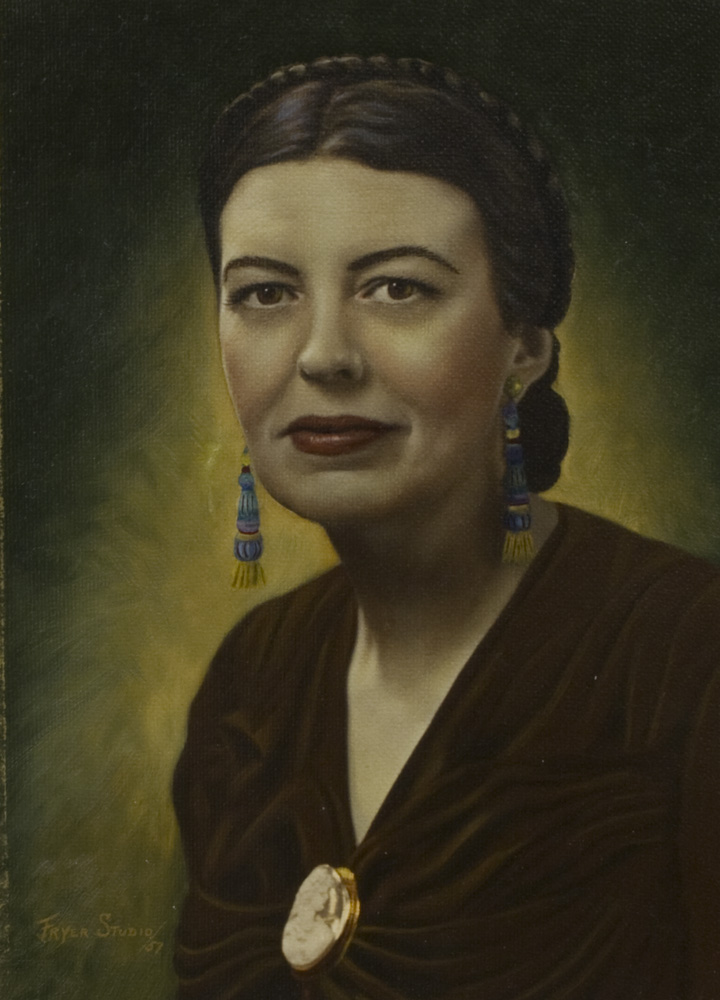
Painting of Wishart from 1957

Eunice Wishart (8 October 1898 – 14 November 1982) was the first female alderman and the first female mayor of Port Arthur, Ontario, serving 1956-1958 as mayor, and 1948-1952, 1954-1955, Nov 15-Dec 1960 as alderman.

Born Eunice Marian Knight in Utica, New York, she was one of three children born to journalist Edwin Knight and his wife Maria Porter. Her mother died in 1900 and her father in 1904, so she was adopted by her father's sister, Anna Knight, Mrs William Sidney Beaver, whose husband was Port Arthur's postmaster. Another aunt Martha Knight was married to Port Arthur's police chief, Richard Nichols. She married John Alexander Wishart 1 January 1922 at Port Arthur, and was often referred to as Mrs J.A. Wishart.

Politically Mrs Wishart was an active member of the Progressive Conservative Party.

Eunice Wishart moved to Toronto in 1974 to live near her children and died there in 1982.

== Bibliography ==
- Weekend magazine v.8 no 42 (1958)
- Ottawa Citizen 17 Oct 1958, 101-102 photos.
