= Dan McIvor (aviator) =

Canadian aviator

Daniel Erskine McIvor, CM (30 August 1911 – 24 February 2005) was a Canadian pilot and aviation pioneer, most notable for his work with the Martin JRM Mars water bombers. He was the son of Canadian Member of Parliament Dan McIvor Sr.

== Honours and recognition ==
In 1998, McIvor was presented with a Lifetime Achievement Award from the BC Aviation Council.

In 2002, he was inducted into the British Columbia and Canadian Aviation Halls of Fame. In 2004, he was invested as a Member of the Order of Canada for having "developed water bombing techniques that have saved thousands of acres of forest in British Columbia."

McIvor Lake, near Campbell River on northern Vancouver Island, is named after him.
