= Lynn Peterson (Canadian politician) =

Canadian politician

7th Mayor of Thunder Bay
- In office December 1, 2003 – November 30, 2010
- Preceded by: Ken Boshcoff
- Succeeded by: Keith Hobbs

Personal details
- Political party: Independent
- Occupation: Politician

Lynn Peterson is a Canadian politician who previously served as the 7th mayor of Thunder Bay from December 2003 to November 2010.

Prior to becoming mayor, Peterson served three years as a member of Thunder Bay City Council, and had nearly 20 years of community service. Before entering municipal politics, she served four terms on the Lakehead District School Board For three consecutive years she was elected chair of the board, and concluded her career in education governance by being elected president of the Ontario Public School Boards Association.

In 2006, due to Thunder Bay's struggling economy, Peterson traveled to Toronto, in order to secure Thunder Bay's Bombardier plant's bid to "Build Canadian and Buy Canadian".

Peterson was defeated by Keith Hobbs in the 2010 Ontario municipal elections.

== Awards ==
- Citizen of Exceptional Achievement (City of Thunder Bay, 2001)
- Bernadine Yackman Award (for outstanding service in education for the children of the North, 2001)
- Giant Heart Award (City of Thunder Bay, 1991)

== See also ==
- List of mayors of Thunder Bay, Ontario
- 2003 Ontario municipal elections
