= George Clavet =

George Onésime Philémon Clavet (August 29, 1843 (or 1845) – July 11, 1909) was a merchant and politician in Ontario, Canada. He served as mayor of Port Arthur from 1903 to 1904 and from 1906 to 1907.

Clavet was born in Saint-Michel-de-Bellechasse, Canada East and came to northwestern Ontario to work as a clerk in a grocery store at Silver Islet in 1871. He opened his own store in Prince Arthur's Landing (later Port Arthur) in 1875. He represented Island Ward for Shuniah municipality from 1881 to 1885; Clavet was appointed councillor in 1881 after no candidates in that ward received any votes.

Clavet was acting mayor of Port Arthur from 1900 to 1902 after George Hugh Macdonell left to pursue business interests in Manitoba. During his time as mayor, significant improvements were made to the drinking water and sewage systems of the town and Waverley Park was acquired from the province. He was the first mayor of Port Arthur after it became a city in 1907.

He died in Port Arthur in 1909.

Clavet Street in Thunder Bay was named in his honour.
