= Keith Hobbs (politician) =

Canadian politician

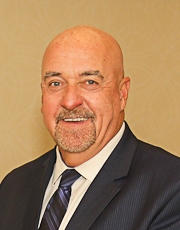
- Hobbs in 2015

8th Mayor of Thunder Bay
- In office December 1, 2010 – November 30, 2018
- Preceded by: Lynn Peterson
- Succeeded by: Bill Mauro

Personal details
- Born: July 9, 1952 (age 74) London, England, United Kingdom
- Party: Independent
- Occupation: Politician

Keith Hobbs (born July 9, 1952) is a Canadian politician who was elected as the 8th mayor of Thunder Bay in the 2010 municipal election. Prior to his term in political office, Hobbs served as a member of the Thunder Bay Police for 34 years. Hobbs was born in London, UK and immigrated to Canada at a young age. His family settled in Thunder Bay in 1964. In 2017, Hobbs and city's police chief, J. P. Levesque, were charged with extortion and obstruction of justice by the Ontario Provincial Police and was found not guilty in 2020.

== Acquittal of charges ==
On July 21, 2017, Hobbs and his wife were charged by the Ontario Provincial Police with extortion and obstruction of justice. The police statement alleges that Keith and Marisa Hobbs and city resident Mary Voss tried to pressure Alexander Zaitzeff, a prominent lawyer in the city, to buy Voss a house in exchange for her silence regarding an allegation that Zaitzeff had sexually assaulted her. Hobbs took a 90-day leave of absence from his duties as mayor upon the announcement of the charges, returning on September 25.

The city's police chief, J. P. Levesque, has also been under suspension since May after being charged with breach of trust and obstruction of justice for allegedly disclosing confidential information about Hobbs. Police have confirmed that the charges stem from the same investigation. Police subsequently withdrew the obstruction of justice charges. On February 20, 2020, Justice Dawson found Hobbs not guilty of extortion.

== City Council Mining meeting disruption ==
On April 9, 2013, Hobbs, while attending a Thunder Bay City Council meeting, arrested a man who stood up and began shouting profanities and was interrupting the meeting. When police arrived, they verified that the man was intoxicated and charged him for being intoxicated in a public place under the Ontario Liquor Licence Act and was ticketed and fined $65. He was put in a drunk tank, until he sobered up.
