= Conmee, Ontario =

Conmee
- Township (single-tier)
- Township of Conmee
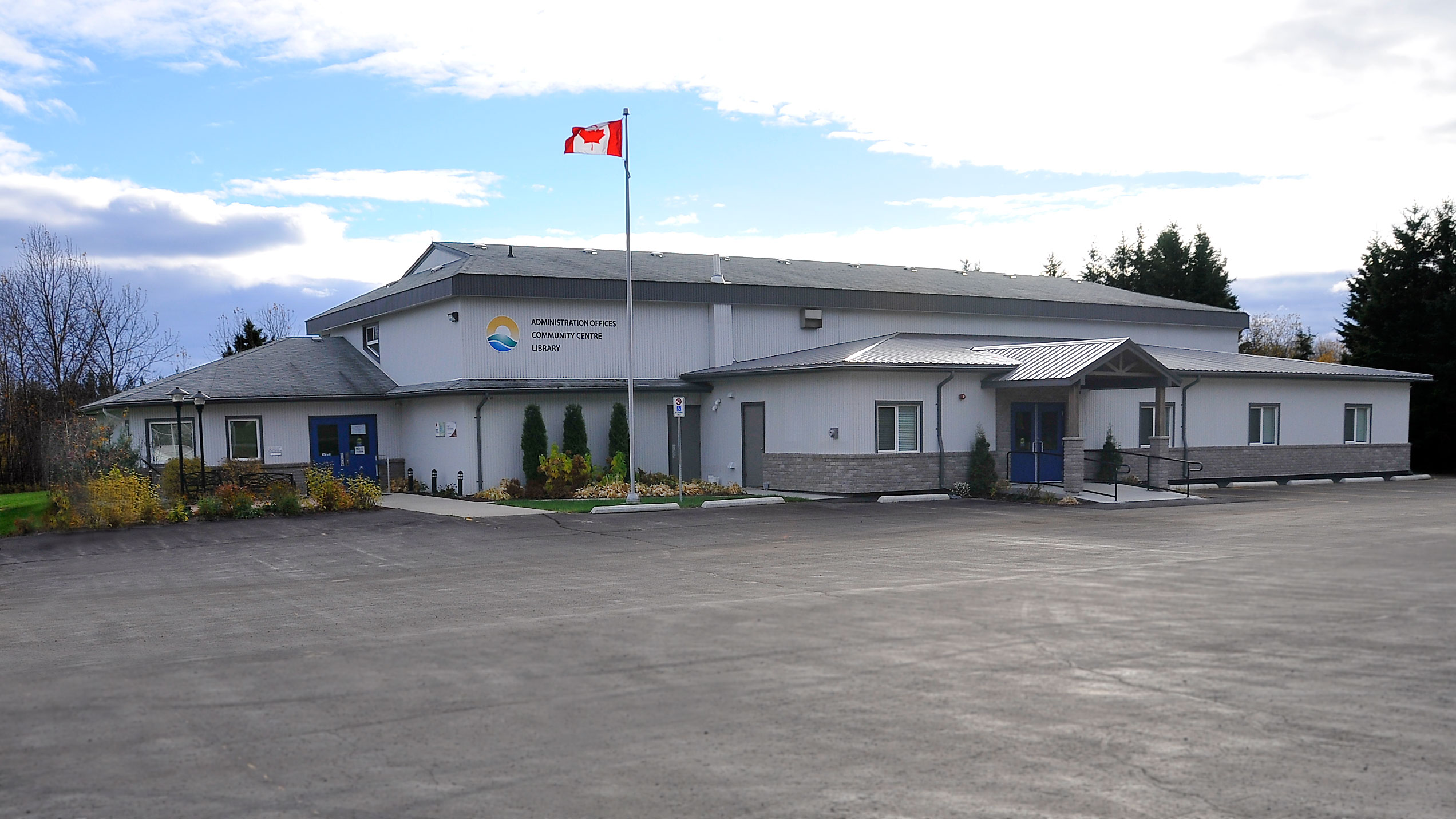
- Conmee Municipal Office & Community Complex
- Motto: Healthy Living, Naturally!
- Location within Ontario
- Coordinates: 48°28′N 89°40′W
- Country: Canada
- Province: Ontario
- District: Thunder Bay

Government
  - Mayor: Sheila Maxwell
  - Fed. riding: Thunder Bay—Rainy River
  - Prov. riding: Thunder Bay—Atikokan

Area
  - Land: 167.65 km^{2} (64.73 sq mi)

Population (2021)
  - Total: 798
  - Density: 4.8/km^{2} (12/sq mi)
- Time zone: UTC-5 (EST)
  - Summer (DST): UTC-4 (EDT)
- Postal Code: P0T
- Area code: 807
- Website: www.conmee.com

Conmee is a township in the Canadian province of Ontario, located within the Thunder Bay District.

The township was named after James Conmee (October 13, 1848 – July 23, 1913), an Ontario businessman and political figure, and is part of the city of Thunder Bay's Census Metropolitan Area. Its main named settlements were the communities of Mokomon (48°28′48″N 89°37′51″W) and Hume (48°26′11″N 89°35′08″W), now historical footnotes in Conmee's development.

Conmee Township was home to a Summer Solstice festival during the late 1960s and throughout the 1970s. Although the summer solstice in the Northern Hemisphere officially occurs around the 21st of June, Conmee's festival would take place over the "Victoria Day" long weekend, at a location colloquially known as "Mokomon's Farm", where people would set up tents in the fields and meadows, local folk and rock music bands would provide entertainment, and local crafts persons would display their art.

In 2013, Conmee commemorated its 100th anniversary since incorporation through several community activities.

== Demographics ==
In the 2021 Census of Population conducted by Statistics Canada, Conmee had a population of 798 living in 296 of its 317 total private dwellings, a change of −2.6% from its 2016 population of 819. With a land area of 167.65 km^{2} (64.73 sq mi), it had a population density of 4.8/km^{2} (12.3/sq mi) in 2021.

Canada census – Conmee community profile

	2021	2016	2011
Population	798 (-2.6% from 2016)	819 (+7.2% from 2011)	764 (+3.2% from 2006)
Land area	167.65 km^{2} (64.73 sq mi)	169.13 km^{2} (65.30 sq mi)	168.81 km^{2} (65.18 sq mi)
Population density	4.8/km^{2} (12/sq mi)	4.8/km^{2} (12/sq mi)	4.5/km^{2} (12/sq mi)
Median age	40.0 (M: 40.0, F: 40.0)	40.1 (M: 38.8, F: 41.2)
Private dwellings	317 (total) 296 (occupied)	327 (total)	299 (total)
Median household income	$97,000	$89,856

References: 2021 2016 2011

Historical census populations – Conmee, Ontario

Year	Pop.	±%
1901	19	—
1911	145	+663.2%
1921	306	+111.0%
1931	390	+27.5%
1941	362	−7.2%
1951	318	−12.2%
1956	359	+12.9%

Year	Pop.	±%
1961	323	−10.0%
1966	322	−0.3%
1971	344	+6.8%
1976	472	+37.2%
1981	569	+20.6%
1986	640	+12.5%
1991	651	+1.7%

Year	Pop.	±%
1996	729	+12.0%
2001	748	+2.6%
2006	740	−1.1%
2011	764	+3.2%
2016	819	+7.2%
2021	798	−2.6%

Source: Statistics Canada

== See also ==
- List of townships in Ontario
