= Bruce Magnuson =

Canadian trade unionist and Comminist leader

Leader of the Communist Party of Ontario
- In office 1956–1967
- Preceded by: Stewart Smith
- Succeeded by: William Stewart

Personal details
- Born: Bruce Adolf H. Magnuson; February 21, 1909 Värmland, Sweden
- Died: June 24, 1995 (aged 86) Toronto, Ontario
- Party: Communist Party of Ontario
- Other political affiliations: Communist Party of Canada; Labor-Progressive Party (1943–1959)
- Occupation: Politician, trade unionist

Bruce Adolf H. Magnuson (February 21, 1909 – June 24, 1995) was a Canadian trade unionist and Communist leader.

Magnuson was born in the Swedish province of Värmland and grew up on his parents' farm. He immigrated to Canada in the spring of 1928 at the age of 19 and worked on farms in Saskatchewan before settling in the Lakehead district of northern Ontario in 1933 where he got involved in a bushworkers' strike led by the Lumber Workers Industrial Union of Canada.

He was hurt working in the bush and spent several months in hospital convalescing during which time he read the Communist Manifesto and other leftwing literature and decided to join the Communist Party of Canada.

Magnuson was elected president of Local 2786 Lumber and Sawmill Workers' Union in 1940 and led the union until 1951 when Communists were purged by the parent union, the United Brotherhood of Carpenters and Joiners of America, after which Magnuson organized a breakaway union, the Canadian Union of Woodworkers In 1946, he led a strike that is credited with establishing the Lumber and Sawmill Workers Union on a broad basis in northern Ontario winning recognition of the union by lumber companies as the bargaining authority for workers in the pulpwood industry and establishing collective bargaining in the region's timber industry.

From August 1940 to August 1942, Magnuson was interned first at Camp Petawawa and later at an internment camp at Hull, Quebec as a subversive under the Defence of Canada Regulations. He and other communists were released after the Soviet Union became an ally as a result of Germany's invasion of the USSR.

Magnuson was on the founding executive of the Labor-Progressive Party in Ontario and a frequent candidate. In the 1957 federal election, Magnuson was the Labor-Progressive candidate in Port Arthur against Liberal cabinet minister C.D. Howe but withdrew a few weeks prior to the election in order to support Co-operative Commonwealth Federation candidate Douglas Fisher who went on to defeat Howe by 1,400 votes in an upset victory Magnuson had won 923 in the 1953 federal election in Port Arthur.

He became leader of the Labor-Progressive Party in Ontario following its crisis in 1956 when provincial leader Stewart Smith, former MPP J.B. Salsberg and hundreds of other party members left in the aftermath of Nikita Khrushchev's Secret Speech, the 1956 Hungarian Uprising as well as revelations about the extent of anti-Semitism in the Soviet Union under Stalin.

Magnuson led the Labor-Progressive Party in the 1959 Ontario election, and remained leader of the party as it renamed itself the Communist Party of Canada (Ontario) and contested the 1963 and 1967 provincial elections

He last ran as a Communist Party candidate in the 1984 federal election in Sudbury winning 75 votes. He remained a member of the Central Executive of the Communist Party of Canada in the mid-1980s.

He died in Toronto in 1995.

== Electoral record ==
1984 Canadian federal election: Sudbury
Party	Candidate	Votes	%	±%
Liberal	Doug Frith	18,012	41.30	-14.40
Progressive Conservative	John A. Dediana	14,100	32.33	+20.50
New Democratic	Harriet Conroy	11,185	25.65	-5.51
Rhinoceros	Phil Moon Popovich	241	0.55	-0.18
Communist	Bruce Magnuson	75	0.17	+0.02
Total valid votes		43,613		

1975 Ontario general election: St. Catharines
Party	Candidate	Votes	%
Progressive Conservative	Rob Johnston	10,064	34.74
Liberal	J.A. Rochefort	9,270	32.00
New Democratic	Fred Dickson	9,215	31.81
Communist	Bruce Magnuson	227	0.78
Independent	Lucylle Boikoff	192	0.66
Total valid votes		28,968	99.13
Total rejected, unmarked and declined ballots		253	0.87
Turnout		29,221	

1968 Canadian federal election: Windsor-Walkerville
Party	Candidate	Votes	%
Liberal	Mark MacGuigan	17,090	49.14
New Democratic	Bert Weeks	12,090	34.76
Progressive Conservative	David Alexander Gray	5,191	14.93
Communist	Bruce A. H. Magnuson	408	1.17
Total valid votes		34,779	

1967 Ontario general election: Dovercourt
Party	Candidate	Votes	%
Liberal	Dante De Monte	6,184	44.02
New Democratic	Otto Bressan	4,598	32.73
Progressive Conservative	Kay Armstrong	2,841	20.22
Communist	Bruce Magnuson	426	3.03
Total valid votes		14,049	

1965 Canadian federal election: Essex East
Party	Candidate	Votes	%	±%
Liberal	Paul Martin Sr.	26,094	63.78	+3.96
Progressive Conservative	David Gourlie	8,142	19.90	-0.78
New Democratic	Hugh McConville	6,133	14.99	-2.79
Communist	Bruce A. H. Magnuson	543	1.33	–
Total valid votes		40,912		
Liberal hold		Swing		

1963 Ontario general election: Port Arthur
Party	Candidate	Votes	%	±%
Progressive Conservative	George Wardrope	13,580	50.56	+9.68
New Democratic	Joseph Shannon	6,731	25.06	-0.77
Liberal	Paul Le May	6,143	22.87	-10.42
Communist	Bruce Magnuson	407	1.51	-
Total valid votes		26,861	100.00	-
Total rejected, unmarked and declined ballots		175	0.65	-0.59
Turnout		27,036	66.70	-4.36
Eligible voters		40,533		
Progressive Conservative hold		Swing		+5.22

1959 Ontario general election: St. Andrew
Party	Candidate	Votes	%	±%
Progressive Conservative	Allan Grossman	3,773	42.08	+0.83
Liberal	Samuel Kelner	2,996	33.41	+23.37
Co-operative Commonwealth	James Robertson	1,664	18.56	+6.77
Labor–Progressive	Bruce Magnuson	402	4.48	-31.23
Social Credit	Dorothy Cureatz	132	1.47	–
Total valid votes		8,967		
Progressive Conservative hold		Swing		

1958 Canadian federal election: Fort William
Party	Candidate	Votes	%	±%
Liberal	Hubert Badanai	9,915	39.84	+1.63
Progressive Conservative	Art Widnall	9,798	39.37	+3.96
Co-operative Commonwealth	Michael Chicorli	4,953	19.90	-6.48
Labor–Progressive	Bruce Magnuson	224	0.90	–
Total valid votes		24,890		
Progressive Conservative hold		Swing		

1955 Ontario general election: Port Arthur
Party	Candidate	Votes	%	±%
Progressive Conservative	George Wardrope	9,517	42.52	+5.14
Co-operative Commonwealth	Ronald Wilmot	7,741	34.59	+4.85
Liberal	Charles MacDonnell	4,347	19.42	-6.83
Labor–Progressive	Bruce Magnuson	775	3.46	-
Total valid votes		22,380	100.00	-
Total rejected, unmarked and declined ballots		277	1.22	-0.36
Turnout		22,657	68.38	+4.36
Eligible voters		33,132		
Progressive Conservative hold		Swing		+4.99

1953 Canadian federal election: Port Arthur
Party	Candidate	Votes	%	±%
Liberal	C. D. Howe	12,272	50.14	-0.97
Co-operative Commonwealth	Ronald Vincent Wilmot	5,865	23.96	-1.91
Progressive Conservative	Bob Robinson	5,415	22.12	+1.64
Labor–Progressive	Bruce Magnuson	923	3.77	–
Total valid votes		24,475		
Liberal hold		Swing		

1951 Ontario general election: Port Arthur
Party	Candidate	Votes	%	±%
Progressive Conservative	George Wardrope	7,758	37.38	+13.86
Co-operative Commonwealth	Frederick Robinson	6,172	29.74	-15.19
Liberal	Frederick Kelly	5,447	26.25	-5.3
Independent Liberal	Bruce Magnuson	1,375	6.63	-
Total valid votes		20,752	100.00	-
Total rejected, unmarked and declined ballots		333	1.58	+0.61
Turnout		21,085	64.02	+1.25
Eligible voters		32,934		
Progressive Conservative gain from Co-operative Commonwealth		Swing		+14.52

1945 Ontario general election: Port Arthur
Party	Candidate	Votes	%	±%
Co-operative Commonwealth	Frederick Robinson	6,403	34.90	-19.38
Liberal	Hobart Styffe	4,375	23.85	-3.60
Progressive Conservative	Herbert Cook	3,254	17.74	-0.52
Independent Liberal	Charles Winnans Cox	2,828	15.41	-
Labor–Progressive	Bruce Magnuson	1,486	8.10	-
Total valid votes		18,346	100.00	-
Total rejected, unmarked and declined ballots		212	1.15	+0.34
Turnout		18,419	73.01	-0.96
Eligible voters		25,419		
Co-operative Commonwealth hold		Swing		
