= Elizabeth Smellie =

Canadian nurse

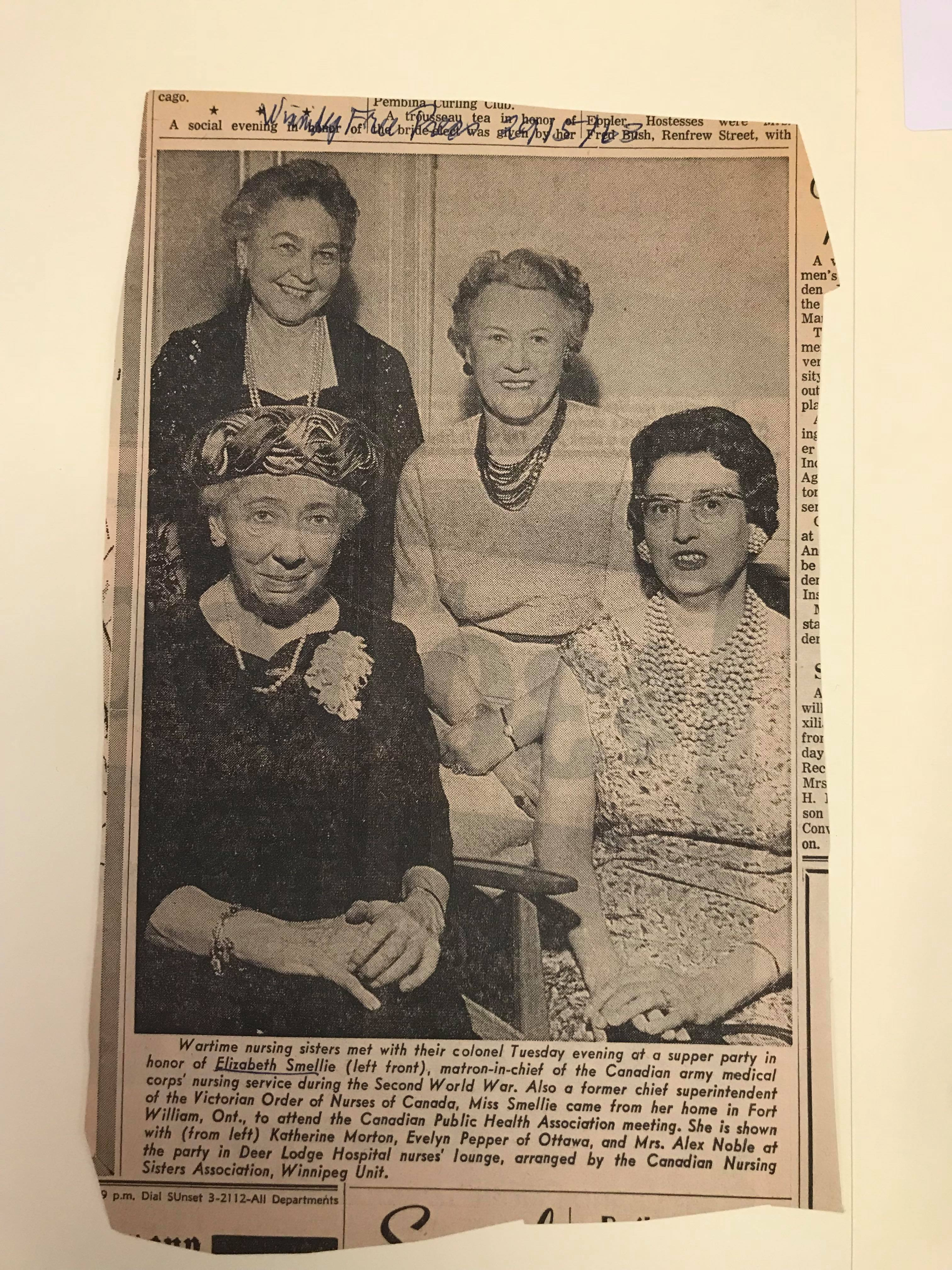
- Born: March 22, 1884; Port Arthur, Ontario
- Died: March 5, 1968 (aged 83); Toronto, Ontario
- Burial place: Riverside Cemetery, Thunder Bay, Ontario
- Military career
- Allegiance: Canada
- Branch: Canadian Army
- Rank: Colonel
- Commands: Canadian Women's Army Medical Corps (1940–44)
- Conflicts: First World War; Second World War
- Awards: Commander of the Order of the British Empire; Royal Red Cross

Elizabeth Lawrie Smellie, CBE, RRC (March 22, 1884 – March 5, 1968) was a Canadian nurse and the first woman to be promoted to the rank of colonel in the Canadian Army.

== Early life ==
Smellie was born in Port Arthur, Ontario, to Thomas Smellie, Conservative Member of the Legislative Assembly of Ontario for Fort William and Lake of the Woods from 1905 to 1911, and Janet Eleanor (née Lawrie). She trained at the Johns Hopkins School of Nursing in Baltimore, Maryland. To her family and friends, she was known as "Beth".

== Nursing career ==
In August 1914, Smellie applied to be a Red Cross nurse; she was told to report to Ottawa on 25 January 1915. During the First World War, she was posted at Cliveden, Lady Astor's estate, and became matron of the Moore Barracks Hospital at Shorncliffe Army Camp where thousands of Canadian soldiers were treated. In 1917 she was decorated by King George V at Buckingham Palace with the Royal Red Cross, first class.

After further post-war training in Boston, Smellie taught public health nursing for two years at McGill University, Montreal. She was Chief Superintendent of the Victorian Order of Nurses from January 1924 to May 1947, except during the Second World War, when she was recalled up into the Canadian Army as Colonel and Matron-in-chief of the Canadian Women's Army Medical Corps from 1940 until 1944. She was the first woman to achieve the rank of colonel in the Canadian Army. A portrait of Smellie, painted by Kenneth Forbes, was unveiled by her successor in Ottawa in 1944.

Smellie was made a Commander of the Order of the British Empire in 1934.

Smellie frequently enjoyed getting back together with her nurse colleagues. For instance, on 29 May 1963, the Winnipeg Free Press published a picture of Smellie along with her three other wartime nursing sisters at a supper party. The supper party was organized in honor of Elizabeth by the Canadian Nursing Sisters Association in Deer Lodge Hospital nurses' lounge. The three nursing sisters with Smellie were Katherine Morton, Evelyn Pepper of Ottawa and Mrs. Alex Noble. She died in Toronto in 1968 at the age of 83 and is buried in Riverside Cemetery, Thunder Bay, Ontario.

== Legacy ==
A historical marker to Smellie was erected by the Ontario Heritage Foundation, and stands in Waverley Park, Thunder Bay, Ontario. It reads:

This celebrated Canadian army nurse and public health authority was born in Port Arthur, Ontario. In 1901 "Beth" Smellie became night supervisor at McKellar General Hospital. Joining the Royal Canadian Army Medical Corps in 1915, she served in France and England. Elizabeth Smellie was demobilized in 1920 and three years later became Chief Superintendent of the Victorian Order of Nurses for Canada. She re-entered the army in 1940 and a year later supervised the organization of the Canadian Women's Army Corps. The first woman to attain the rank of Colonel in Canada's Armed Forces, Col. Smellie achieved many honours, including Commander of the Most Excellent Order of the British Empire and the Royal Red Cross Medal. After World War II she returned to the V.O.N., and retired in 1947.

Smellie was designated a Person of National Historic Significance in 2011 by the federal government, on the recommendation of the national Historic Sites and Monuments Board. A federal plaque is typically erected to such Persons, as well as for National Historic Events and Sites. A plaque to honour Elizabeth Smellie can be found at 236 Metcalfe St., Ottawa. The mandate of the Historic Sites and Monuments Board of Canada is to advise the Government of Canada, through the Minister of the Environment, on the commemoration of nationally significant aspects of Canada's history following a thorough evaluation process and recommendation by the Board, the Minister declares the site, event or person of national historic significance.

== Sources ==
- MacLean, Mary R. Colonel Elizabeth Smellie CBE, Thunder Bay Historical Museum Society, Papers and Records, III (1975), 16–18 with reproduction of portrait by Kenneth Forbes on page 16.
