= Thomas Smellie (politician) =

Canadian politician

Ontario MPP
- In office 1905–1911
- Preceded by: Douglas Cameron
- Succeeded by: Charles William Jarvis
- Constituency: Fort William; Fort William and Lake of the Woods (1905-1908)

Personal details
- Born: February 13, 1849 Fergus, Canada West
- Died: May 20, 1925 (aged 76)
- Party: Conservative
- Relations: Elizabeth Lawrie Smellie, daughter

Thomas Stuart Traill Smellie (February 13, 1849 – May 20, 1925) was an Ontario physician, merchant and political figure. He represented Fort William and Lake of the Woods (1905-1908) and Fort William (1908-1911) in the Legislative Assembly of Ontario as a Conservative member.

Smellie was born in Fergus, Canada West, the son of the Reverend George Smellie (1811–1896), and studied at the University of Toronto and McGill University. He married Janet Eleanor Lawrie on 14 April 1879. He came to Prince Arthur's Landing (later Port Arthur) in 1879 and was a town councillor in 1885. He settled in Fort William in 1891, where he became Medical Officer of Health. Smellie was owner of the Daily Times-Journal from 1901 to 1908. With his brother, A.G.P. Smellie, he owned a number of stores and creameries in the Russell, Manitoba area. He was appointed registrar of the High Court and Surrogate Court for Thunder Bay District in 1911 and served in these positions until February 1921.

According to the Daily Times-Journal, "He was man of broad views. Physically a big man, he had a mind constructed on the same massive proportions, and he was endowed with a fine capacity for learning."

His daughter Elizabeth was chief superintendent for the Victorian Order of Nurses and served as Colonel and Matron-in-chief of the Canadian Women's Army Medical Corps during World War II.
