= Clare Mapledoram =

Canadian politician (1903–1983)

Ontario MPP
- In office 1951–1959
- Preceded by: Charlie Cox
- Succeeded by: John Chapple
- Constituency: Fort William

Personal details
- Born: March 10, 1903 Fort William, Ontario
- Died: October 9, 1983 (aged 80) Thunder Bay, Ontario
- Party: Progressive Conservative
- Spouse: Mary Dorica
- Children: 4
- Occupation: Manager

Clare Edgar Mapledoram (March 10, 1903 – October 9, 1983) was a politician in Ontario, Canada. He was a Progressive Conservative member of the Legislative Assembly of Ontario from 1951 to 1959 who represented the northern Ontario riding of Fort William. He was a cabinet minister in the government of Leslie Frost.

== Background ==
Mapledoram was born in Fort William, Ontario, the son of William James Mapledoram (1871-1937), and grandson of William Clare Currie Mapledoram (1847-1900), a native of Taunton, England, who served one year as a Fort William alderman in 1893. In 1927, he married Mary Dorica. Mapledoram was a personnel manager for the Great Lakes Paper Company. He and his wife Mary raised four children, three sons and a daughter. He died in Thunder Bay at the age of 80.

== Politics ==
Mapledoram served as reeve for Neebing Township from 1947 to 1951. He also served as president of the local Chamber of Commerce.

In the 1951 provincial election, he ran as the Progressive Conservative candidate in the riding of Fort William. He defeated Liberal incumbent Charlie Cox by 722 votes. He was re-elected in 1955.

He was Minister of Lands and Forests in the provincial cabinet from July 1954 to 1958, but resigned from cabinet after he was implicated in the Northern Ontario Natural Gas scandal. He was defeated in the 1959 election by Liberal John Chapple. Mapledoram was the second person from Fort William to join the Ontario cabinet, the first being Harry Mills, Minister of Mines 1919-1923.

=== Cabinet posts ===
Frost ministry, Province of Ontario (1949–1961)
Cabinet post (1)
Predecessor	Office	Successor
Welland Gemmell	Minister of Lands and Forests; 1954-1958	Wilf Spooner
