= Hugh W. Kennedy =

Canadian politician from Ontario

Member of the Ontario Provincial Parliament for Port Arthur and Rainy River
- In office January 25, 1905 – January 24, 1907
- Preceded by: James Conmee
- Succeeded by: William Alfred Preston

Personal details
- Party: Liberal

Hugh W. Kennedy was a Canadian politician from Ontario. He represented Port Arthur and Rainy River in the Legislative Assembly of Ontario from 1905 to 1907. He was unseated on petition on January 10, 1907.

== See also ==
- 11th Parliament of Ontario
