= Franklin Harford Spence =

Canadian politician (1883–1943)

Ontario MPP
- In office 1937–1943
- Preceded by: Joseph Edmund Crawford
- Succeeded by: Garfield Anderson
- In office 1923–1934
- Preceded by: Harry Mills
- Succeeded by: Joseph Edmund Crawford
- Constituency: Fort William

Personal details
- Born: February 22, 1883
- Died: January 16, 1943 (aged 59)
- Party: Conservative
- Spouse: Ethel Greve McCarthy (m. 1907)

Franklin Harford Spence (February 22, 1883- January 16, 1943) was an Ontario pharmacist and political figure. He represented Fort William in the Legislative Assembly of Ontario from 1923 to 1934 and from 1937 to 1943 as a Conservative member. He defeated UFO-Labor cabinet minister Harry (Henry) Mills in the 1923 election, was re-elected in December 1926 and again in October 1929, chiefly because of the popularity of Ontario premier Howard Ferguson - "A vote for Spence is a vote for Ferguson," he advertised. He played a subordinate role to other Conservative party heavyweights from Northern Ontario, Donald McDonald Hogarth and Francis Henry Keefer. He was defeated by Liberal Joseph Edmund Crawford in the June 1934 election, but won the seat again in October 1937 when the Liberal vote split between the official candidate Harry Murphy and the Independent Liberal Crawford.

He was the son of James Edward Spence and was educated in Prince Albert, Saskatchewan and at Toronto University. In 1907, he married Ethel Greve McCarthy. Spence served on the Fort William city council 1921-1923 for Ward 4 (West Fort).
