= Bob Andras =

Canadian politician

The Honourable Robert Andras PC
- Official 1979 portrait

President of the Treasury Board
- In office September 14, 1976 – November 23, 1978
- Prime Minister: Pierre Trudeau
- Preceded by: Jean Chrétien
- Succeeded by: Judd Buchanan

Minister of Manpower and Immigration
- In office November 27, 1972 – September 13, 1976
- Prime Minister: Pierre Trudeau
- Preceded by: Bryce Mackasey
- Succeeded by: Bud Cullen

Minister of Consumer and Corporate Affairs
- In office January 28, 1972 – November 26, 1972
- Prime Minister: Pierre Trudeau
- Preceded by: Ron Basford
- Succeeded by: Herb Gray

Minister without portfolio
- In office July 6, 1968 – June 29, 1971
- Prime Minister: Pierre Trudeau

Member of Parliament for Thunder Bay—Superior North
- In office May 22, 1979 – February 17, 1980
- Preceded by: Riding created
- Succeeded by: Jack Masters

Member of Parliament for Port Arthur
- In office November 8, 1965 – May 21, 1979
- Preceded by: Douglas M. Fisher
- Succeeded by: Riding dissolved

Personal details
- Born: Robert Knight Andras; February 21, 1921 Lachine, Quebec, Canada
- Died: November 17, 1982 (aged 61) Vancouver, British Columbia, Canada
- Party: Liberal
- Spouse: Frances Hunt (m. 1945)
- Children: 2
- Education: Wesley College
- Profession: Automobile dealer; businessman

Military service
- Allegiance: Canada
- Branch/service: Canadian Army
- Rank: Major
- Unit: Queen's Own Cameron Highlanders of Canada
- Battles/wars: World War II

Robert Knight "Bob" Andras PC (February 21, 1921 -November 17, 1982) was a Canadian politician and businessman who served in multiple cabinet posts under Prime Minister Pierre Trudeau.

He was born February 21, 1921, in Lachine, Quebec. Andras moved to Port Arthur, Ontario in 1958 as the general manager of Gibson Motors Ltd., a car dealership he assumed ownership of in 1960.

Andras first ran for Parliament in 1965, contesting C. D. Howe's old riding of Port Arthur, and won. He first entered government as a Minister without Portfolio from 1968 to 1971. His subsequent appointments include Minister of State for Urban Affairs from 1971 to 1972, Minister of Consumer and Corporate Affairs in 1972, Minister of Manpower and Immigration from 1972 to 1976, President of the Treasury Board from 1976 to 1978, and Minister of State for Economic Development from 1978 to 1979.

As Minister without Portfolio from 1968 to 1971, Andras started collaborating with the Minister of Northern Affairs, Jean Chrétien, to shape future Indian policy. During the summer of 1968, he attended consultation meetings with Aboriginal representatives. Aboriginal people felt that Andras understood their issues and would make a difference in Indian policy compared to previous bureaucratic rhetoric. However, Andras did not have the opportunity to push the agenda forward.

Andras retired from politics in 1979 and re-entered the business world. He died of cancer on November 17, 1982, at his home in Vancouver.

== Sources ==
Parliament of Canada
Preceded by Doug Fisher, New Democrat	Member of Parliament for Port Arthur; 1965–1979	Succeeded by Last member, riding abolished in 1976
Preceded by First member, riding created in 1976	Member of Parliament for Thunder Bay—Nipigon; 1979–1980	Succeeded by Jack Masters
Special Cabinet Responsibilities
Predecessor	Title	Successor
'First, position created 1971'	Minister responsible for the Status of Women; June 11, 1971 – August 7, 1974	Marc Lalonde
