= Port Arthur (provincial electoral district) =

Ontario electoral district

Defunct provincial electoral district
- Legislature: Legislative Assembly of Ontario
- District created: 1902
- District abolished: 1996
- First contested: 1902
- Last contested: 1995

Demographics
- Census division: Thunder Bay District
- Census subdivision: Port Arthur → Thunder Bay

Port Arthur was an electoral riding in Ontario, Canada. In 1902 the riding was created as Port Arthur and Rainy River. Six years later it was split into two ridings: Port Arthur and Rainy River. In 1996, it was merged with the riding of Lake Nipigon to form Thunder Bay—Superior North.

When the city of Port Arthur merged with the neighbouring city of Fort William in 1970 to create the current city of Thunder Bay, the riding of Port Arthur and the riding Fort William continued as separate districts serving the new city.

== Members of Provincial Parliament ==
Port Arthur
Assembly	Years	Member	Party
Port Arthur and Rainy River
10th	1902–1904	James Conmee	Liberal
11th	1905–1907	Hugh W. Kennedy	Liberal
11th	1907–1908	William Alfred Preston	Conservative
Port Arthur
12th	1908–1911	John James Carrick	Conservative
13th	1911–1914	Donald Hogarth	Conservative
14th	1914–1919	Donald Hogarth	Conservative
15th	1919–1923	Donald Hogarth	Conservative
16th	1923–1926	Francis Henry Keefer	Conservative
17th	1926–1929	Donald Hogarth	Independent Conservative
18th	1929–1934	Donald Hogarth	Conservative
19th	1934–1937	Charles Winnans Cox	Liberal
20th	1937–1943	Charles Winnans Cox	Liberal
21st	1943–1945	Frederick Oliver Robinson	Co-operative Commonwealth
22nd	1945–1948	Frederick Oliver Robinson	Co-operative Commonwealth
23rd	1948–1951	Frederick Oliver Robinson	Co-operative Commonwealth
24th	1951–1955	George Wardrope	Progressive Conservative
25th	1955–1959	George Wardrope	Progressive Conservative
26th	1959–1963	George Wardrope	Progressive Conservative
27th	1963–1967	George Wardrope	Progressive Conservative
28th	1967–1971	Ron Knight	Liberal
29th	1971–1975	Jim Foulds	New Democratic
30th	1975–1977	Jim Foulds	New Democratic
31st	1977–1981	Jim Foulds	New Democratic
32nd	1981–1985	Jim Foulds	New Democratic
33rd	1985–1987	Jim Foulds	New Democratic
34th	1987–1990	Taras Kozyra	Liberal
35th	1990–1995	Shelley Wark-Martyn	New Democratic
36th	1995–1999	Michael Gravelle	Liberal
Sourced from the Ontario Legislative Assembly
Merged into Thunder Bay—Superior North before the 1999 election

== Election results ==
1995 Ontario general election
Party	Candidate	Votes	%	±%
Liberal	Michael Gravelle	14,281	48.92	+9.77
New Democratic	Shelley Wark-Martyn	7,490	25.66	–17.22
Progressive Conservative	Jim Doherty	6,554	22.45	+8.59
Family Coalition	Anita Harris	683	2.34	–1.76
Independent	Paul Weber	182	0.62	–
Total valid votes		29,190	98.91	
Total rejected, unmarked and declined ballots		322	1.09	–0.69
Turnout		29,512	61.91	–0.32
Eligible voters		47,672		
Liberal gain from New Democratic		Swing		+13.49
Source: Elections Ontario

1990 Ontario general election
Party	Candidate	Votes	%	±%
New Democratic	Shelley Wark-Martyn	11,919	42.88	+3.44
Liberal	Taras Kozyra	10,885	39.16	–6.68
Progressive Conservative	Tony Stehmann	3,854	13.86	–0.87
Family Coalition	Claude E. Wyspianski	1,140	4.10	–
Total valid votes		27,798	98.22	
Total rejected, unmarked and declined ballots		503	1.78	+1.43
Turnout		28,301	62.22	–5.55
Eligible voters		45,482		
New Democratic gain from Liberal		Swing		+5.06
Source: Elections Ontario

1987 Ontario general election
Party	Candidate	Votes	%	±%
Liberal	Taras Kozyra	13,747	45.83	+24.62
New Democratic	Chris Southcott	11,828	39.43	–5.56
Progressive Conservative	Evelyn Dodds	4,419	14.73	–19.06
Total valid votes		29,994	99.65	
Total rejected ballots		106	0.35	–0.03
Turnout		30,100	67.77	+4.79
Eligible voters		44,414		
Liberal gain from New Democratic		Swing		+15.07
Source: Elections Ontario

1985 Ontario general election
Party	Candidate	Votes	%	±%
New Democratic	Jim Foulds	13,084	44.99	–1.10
Progressive Conservative	Clarence Allan (Swede) Johnson	9,826	33.79	–6.99
Liberal	John Ranta	6,169	21.21	+9.00
Total valid votes		29,079	99.62	
Total rejected ballots		111	0.38	–0.03
Turnout		29,190	62.99	+1.80
Eligible voters		46,344		
New Democratic hold		Swing		+2.94
Source: Elections Ontario

1981 Ontario general election
Party	Candidate	Votes	%	±%
New Democratic	Jim Foulds	12,258	46.10	+5.96
Progressive Conservative	Allan Laakkonen	10,844	40.78	+2.06
Liberal	Kenneth R. Tilson	3,247	12.21	–7.87
Independent	Dennis Deveau	140	0.53	–
Communist	Paul Pugh	103	0.39	–0.67
Total valid votes		26,592	99.59	
Total rejected ballots		110	0.41	+0.14
Turnout		26,702	61.18	–0.18
Eligible voters		43,644		
New Democratic hold		Swing		+1.95
Source: Elections Ontario

1977 Ontario general election
Party	Candidate	Votes	%	±%
New Democratic	Jim Foulds	9,629	40.14	–9.60
Progressive Conservative	Allan Laakkonen	9,290	38.72	+7.79
Liberal	Juha Siimes	4,818	20.08	+1.76
Communist	Philip G. Harris	254	1.06	+0.05
Total valid votes		23,991	99.73	
Total rejected ballots		66	0.27	–0.02
Turnout		24,057	61.36	–4.94
Eligible voters		39,207		
New Democratic hold		Swing		–8.70
Source: Elections Ontario

1975 Ontario general election
Party	Candidate	Votes	%	±%
New Democratic	Jim Foulds	12,213	49.74	+4.68
Progressive Conservative	Bill Morgan	7,595	30.93	–8.75
Liberal	Joe Vander Wees	4,499	18.32	+3.07
Communist	Nancy McDonald	247	1.01	–
Total valid votes		24,554	99.71	
Total rejected ballots		72	0.29	–0.16
Turnout		24,626	66.30	–9.17
Eligible voters		37,144		
New Democratic hold		Swing		+6.71
Source: Elections Ontario

1971 Ontario general election
Party	Candidate	Votes	%	±%
New Democratic	Jim Foulds	11,461	45.06	+16.21
Progressive Conservative	Charles Johnston	10,092	39.68	+6.10
Liberal	Rita Ubriaco	3,880	15.26	–22.31
Total valid votes		25,433	99.55	
Total rejected ballots		115	0.45	–0.15
Turnout		25,548	75.47	+4.25
Eligible voters		33,854		
New Democratic gain from Liberal		Swing		+11.15
Source: Elections Ontario

1967 Ontario general election
Party	Candidate	Votes	%	±%
Liberal	Ron Knight	7,636	37.56	+14.69
Progressive Conservative	George Wardrope	6,826	33.58	–16.98
New Democratic	May Seaman	5,866	28.86	+3.80
Total valid votes		20,328	99.40	
Total rejected ballots		122	0.60	–0.06
Turnout		20,450	71.21	+4.54
Eligible voters		28,716		
Liberal gain from Progressive Conservative		Swing		+15.83
Source: Elections Ontario

1963 Ontario general election
Party	Candidate	Votes	%	±%
Progressive Conservative	George Wardrope	13,580	50.56	+9.67
New Democratic	Joe W. Shannon	6,731	25.06	–0.77
Liberal	Paul J. Le May	6,143	22.87	–10.42
Communist	Bruce Magnuson	407	1.52	–
Total valid votes		26,861	99.34	
Total rejected ballots		178	0.66	–0.58
Turnout		27,039	66.68	–4.22
Eligible voters		40,552		
Progressive Conservative hold		Swing		+5.22
Source: Elections Ontario

1959 Ontario general election
Party	Candidate	Votes	%	±%
Progressive Conservative	George Wardrope	10,881	40.88	–1.64
Liberal	Dan Coghlan	8,859	33.29	+13.86
Co-operative Commonwealth	Oliver Breton	6,874	25.83	–8.76
Total valid votes		26,614	98.76	
Total rejected ballots		333	1.24	+0.01
Turnout		26,947	70.89	+2.51
Eligible voters		38,011		
Progressive Conservative hold		Swing		–7.75
Source: Elections Ontario

1955 Ontario general election
Party	Candidate	Votes	%	±%
Progressive Conservative	George Wardrope	9,517	42.52	+5.14
Co-operative Commonwealth	Ronald Vincent Wilmot	7,741	34.59	+4.85
Liberal	Charles C. MacDonnell	4,347	19.42	–6.82
Labor–Progressive	Bruce Magnuson	775	3.46	–3.16
Total valid votes		22,380	98.78	
Total rejected ballots		277	1.22	+0.34
Turnout		22,657	68.38	+4.81
Eligible voters		33,132		
Progressive Conservative hold		Swing		+0.15
Source: Elections Ontario

1951 Ontario general election
Party	Candidate	Votes	%	±%
Progressive Conservative	George Wardrope	7,758	37.38	+13.86
Co-operative Commonwealth	Frederick Oliver Robinson	6,172	29.74	–15.19
Liberal	Frederick V. Kelly	5,447	26.25	–5.30
Independent Labour	Bruce Magnuson	1,375	6.63	–
Total valid votes		20,752	99.12	
Total rejected ballots		184	0.88	–0.09
Turnout		20,936	63.57	+0.80
Eligible voters		32,934		
Progressive Conservative gain from Co-operative Commonwealth		Swing		+14.52
Source: Elections Ontario

1948 Ontario general election
Party	Candidate	Votes	%	±%
Co-operative Commonwealth	Frederick Oliver Robinson	8,734	44.93	+10.03
Liberal	Hubert Styffe	6,132	31.55	+7.70
Progressive Conservative	George Wardrope	4,572	23.52	+5.78
Total valid votes		19,438	99.03	
Total rejected ballots		191	0.97	–0.17
Turnout		19,629	62.77	–9.62
Eligible voters		31,273		
Co-operative Commonwealth hold		Swing		+1.17
Source: Elections Ontario

1945 Ontario general election
Party	Candidate	Votes	%	±%
Co-operative Commonwealth	Frederick Oliver Robinson	6,403	34.90	–19.38
Liberal	Hubert Styffe	4,375	23.85	–3.61
Progressive Conservative	Herbert Cook	3,254	17.74	–0.53
Independent	Charles Winnans Cox	2,828	15.41	–12.04
Labor–Progressive	Bruce Magnuson	1,486	8.10	–
Total valid votes		18,346	98.86	
Total rejected ballots		212	1.14	+0.33
Turnout		18,558	72.39	–1.58
Eligible voters		25,637		
Co-operative Commonwealth hold		Swing		–7.89
Source: Elections Ontario

1943 Ontario general election
Party	Candidate	Votes	%	±%
Co-operative Commonwealth	Frederick Oliver Robinson	7,929	54.28	+45.39
Liberal	Charles Winnans Cox	4,010	27.45	–28.89
Progressive Conservative	Harold Anthony Oakes	2,668	18.27	–16.50
Total valid votes		14,607	99.19	
Total rejected ballots		120	0.81	–0.20
Turnout		14,727	73.97	+0.05
Eligible voters		19,910		
Co-operative Commonwealth gain from Liberal		Swing		+30.95
Source: Elections Ontario

1937 Ontario general election
Party	Candidate	Votes	%	±%
Liberal	Charles Winnans Cox	8,006	56.34	–2.59
Conservative	George Wardrope	4,940	34.77	+1.15
Co-operative Commonwealth	John McKevitt	1,263	8.89	+6.21
Total valid votes		14,209	98.99	
Total rejected ballots		145	1.01	–0.22
Turnout		14,354	73.92	–7.18
Eligible voters		19,418		
Liberal hold		Swing		–1.87
Source: Elections Ontario

1934 Ontario general election
Party	Candidate	Votes	%	±%
Liberal	Charles Winnans Cox	7,514	58.93	–
Conservative	Donald A. Clark	4,286	33.62	–
Farm-Labour	John Gillbanks	608	4.77	–
Co-operative Commonwealth	Samuel Wright	342	2.68	–
Total valid votes		12,750	98.77	
Total rejected ballots		159	1.23	–
Turnout		12,909	81.10	–
Eligible voters		15,917		
Liberal gain from Conservative		Swing		–
Source: Elections Ontario

1929 Ontario general election
Party	Candidate	Votes
Conservative	Donald Hogarth	acclaimed
Source: Elections Ontario

1926 Ontario general election
Party	Candidate	Votes	%	±%
Independent Conservative	Donald Hogarth	2,683	38.31	–
Conservative	Francis Henry Keefer	2,511	35.85	–4.42
Liberal	George E. Eakins	1,810	25.84	–1.87
Total valid votes		7,004	99.40	
Total rejected ballots		42	0.60	–0.21
Turnout		7,046	60.40	+2.21
Eligible voters		11,666		
Independent Conservative gain from Conservative		Swing		–
Source: Elections Ontario

1923 Ontario general election
Party	Candidate	Votes	%	±%
Conservative	Francis Henry Keefer	2,331	40.27	–1.07
Liberal	Alexander Jarvis McComber	1,604	27.71	–5.88
United Farmers	James J. Southern	1,346	23.25	–
Independent	Edward John Blaquier	284	4.91	–20.17
Independent	Henry Alfred Bryan	224	3.87	–
Total valid votes		5,789	99.19	
Total rejected ballots		47	0.81	–1.24
Turnout		5,836	58.19	–9.73
Eligible voters		10,030		
Conservative hold		Swing		+2.41
Source: Elections Ontario

1919 Ontario general election
Party	Candidate	Votes	%	±%
Conservative	Donald Hogarth	2,578	41.33	–8.12
Liberal	John Patrick Mooney	2,095	33.59	+1.72
Independent	Edward John Blaquier	1,564	25.08	–
Total valid votes		6,237	97.96	
Total rejected ballots		130	2.04	+0.53
Turnout		6,367	67.91	+2.78
Eligible voters		9,375		
Conservative hold		Swing		–4.92
Source: Elections Ontario

1914 Ontario general election
Party	Candidate	Votes	%	±%
Conservative	Donald Hogarth	2,219	49.45	–23.10
Liberal	Isaac Lamont Matthews	1,430	31.87	–
Independent	Frank Herbert Sangster	838	18.68	–
Total valid votes		4,487	98.49	
Total rejected ballots		69	1.51	–0.27
Turnout		4,556	65.13	+22.34
Eligible voters		6,995		
Conservative hold		Swing		–11.55
Source: Elections Ontario

1911 Ontario general election
Party	Candidate	Votes	%	±%
Conservative	Donald Hogarth	1,515	72.56	+17.40
Socialist	Frederick Urry	573	27.44	+20.86
Total valid votes		2,088	98.21	
Total rejected ballots		38	1.79	–0.00
Turnout		2,126	42.79	–28.84
Eligible voters		4,968		
Conservative hold		Swing		–1.73
Source: Elections Ontario

1908 Ontario general election
Party	Candidate	Votes	%	±%
Conservative	John James Carrick	1,241	55.16	+4.89
Independent Conservative	George Mooring	861	38.27	–
Socialist	Leopold S. English	148	6.58	–
Total valid votes		2,250	98.21	
Total rejected ballots		41	1.79	–
Turnout		2,291	71.64	–
Eligible voters		3,198		
Conservative gain from Liberal		Swing		+21.58
Source: Elections Ontario

1905 Ontario general election: Port Arthur and Rainy River
Party	Candidate	Votes	%	±%
Liberal	Hugh W. Kennedy	1,285	50.27	–16.27
Conservative	William Alfred Preston	1,271	49.73	+16.27
Total valid votes		2,556	98.76	
Total rejected ballots		32	1.24	+1.24
Turnout		2,588	53.77	+7.71
Eligible voters		4,813		
Liberal hold		Swing		–16.27
Source: Elections Ontario

1902 Ontario general election: Port Arthur and Rainy River
Party	Candidate	Votes	%
Liberal	James Conmee	1,124	66.55
Conservative	Joseph G. King	565	33.45
Total valid votes		1,689	100.00
Total rejected ballots			
Turnout		1,689	46.06
Eligible voters		3,667	
Liberal pickup new district.			
Source: Elections Ontario
