= Mickey Hennessy =

Canadian politician and boxer (1915–1991)

Ontario MPP
- In office 1977–1987
- Preceded by: Iain Angus
- Succeeded by: Lyn McLeod
- Constituency: Fort William

Personal details
- Born: August 8, 1915 Montreal, Quebec
- Died: March 5, 1991 (aged 75) Thunder Bay, Ontario
- Party: Progressive Conservative
- Occupation: Professional boxer
- Portfolio: Deputy Opposition Whip (1986-87)

Michael Patrick "Mickey" Hennessy (August 8, 1915 – March 5, 1991) was a boxer and politician in Ontario, Canada. He served in the Legislative Assembly of Ontario from 1977 to 1987, as a member of the Progressive Conservative Party.

== Background ==
Hennessy was born in Montreal, Quebec, and educated at St. Michael's High School and Luke Callaghan High School. During the 1930s, he was a national boxing champion in Canada and was inducted to the Canadian Boxing Hall of Fame in 1977. Hennessy was a Roman Catholic, and a member of the Knights of Columbus.

== Politics ==
Hennessy was a member of the Fort William city council from 1962 to 1969, and served on the Thunder Bay City Council for seven years after amalgamation.

He was first elected to the Ontario legislature in the 1977 provincial election, defeating New Democratic Party candidate Iain Angus by 2,256 votes in Fort William. Hennessy was re-elected without difficulty in the provincial elections of 1981, and 1985. He served as a backbench supporter of the Bill Davis and Frank Miller administrations. He lost his provincial seat in the 1987 election, falling to Liberal Lyn McLeod by 1,463 votes.

Hennessy campaigned for re-election to the Thunder Bay City Council in 1988, and won more votes than any other candidate. He died in 1991, less than twenty-four hours after attending his last council meeting.

The legislature paid tribute to Hennessy on March 18, 1991. Mike Harris, then leader of the Progressive Conservative Party, credited Hennessy with bringing "a touch of the common person back to the caucus discussions".
