= John Boyle Chapple =

Canadian politician (1909–1990)

Ontario MPP
- In office 1959–1963
- Preceded by: Clare Edward Mapledoram
- Succeeded by: Ted Freeman
- Constituency: Fort William

Personal details
- Born: August 4, 1909; Simcoe County, Ontario
- Died: August 26, 1990 (aged 81); Thunder Bay, Ontario
- Political party: Liberal

John Boyle Chapple (August 4, 1909 – August 26, 1990) was a Canadian politician, who represented Fort William in the Legislative Assembly of Ontario from 1959 to 1963 as a Liberal member.

== Biography and career ==
Chapple was born in Simcoe County, Ontario to Clement Edward Chapple and Annie May Boyle.

Chapple was elected in the general election in 1959 and but was defeated in the general elections in 1963. During the 26th Legislative Assembly of Ontario he served on eight Standing Committees of the Legislative Assembly, with a particular interest in lands and forests, mining, and agricultural issues. Chapple lost, in the 1963 general election, to the NDP candidate, Ted Freeman. Prior to being elected as a provincial MPP, Chapple had served one term as a Councillor on Fort William City Council from 1949 to 1951.
