= John James Carrick =

Canadian politician

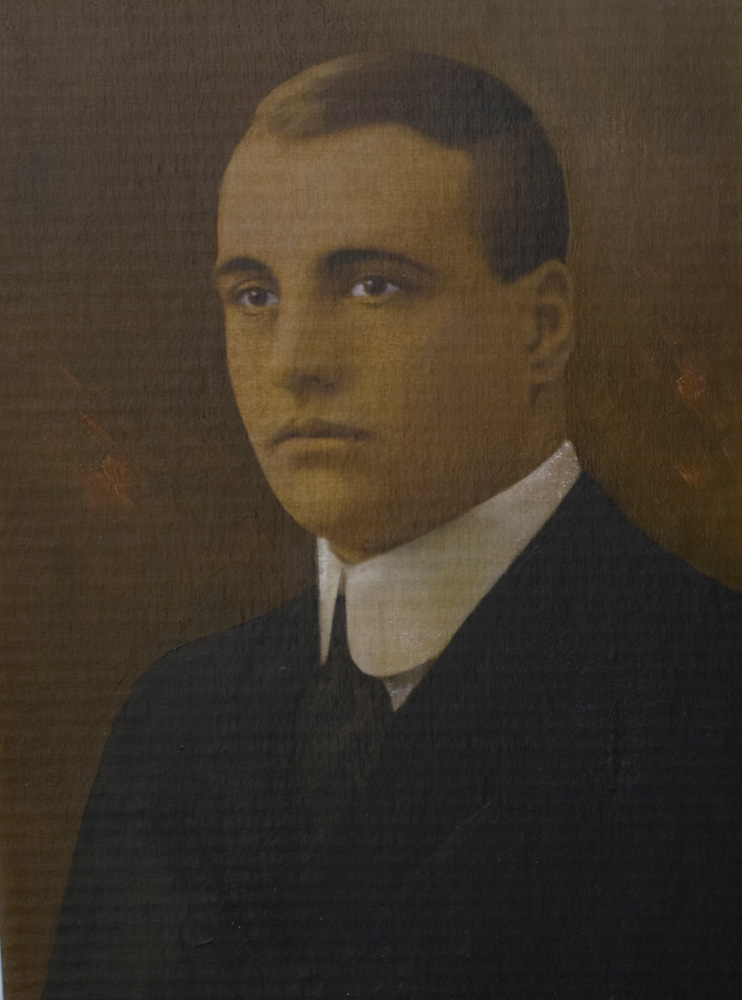
- Painting of Carrick from 1908

Member of Parliament for Thunder Bay and Rainy River
- In office 1911–1917
- Preceded by: James Conmee
- Succeeded by: Riding abolished

Ontario MPP
- In office 1908–1911
- Preceded by: William Alfred Preston
- Succeeded by: Donald Hogarth
- Constituency: Port Arthur

Personal details
- Born: September 17, 1873 Terre Haute, Indiana
- Died: May 11, 1966 (aged 92) Mexico City
- Political party: Conservative
- Spouse: Mary Jane Day (m. 1899)
- Relations: Donald Carrick, son
- Occupation: Real estate promoter

John James Carrick (September 17, 1873 – May 11, 1966) was an Ontario real estate promoter and political figure. He was always referred to by his initials as J.J. Carrick. Carrick served as mayor of Port Arthur in 1908. He represented Port Arthur in the Legislative Assembly of Ontario from 1908 to 1911 and Thunder Bay and Rainy River in the House of Commons of Canada from 1911 to 1917 as a Conservative member. He stepped aside in 1917 for his erstwhile protégé Donald McDonald Hogarth, but when the Port Arthur Liberal Association refused to accept Hogarth as the Unionist Party candidate, he gave way to Conservative Francis Henry Keefer who won the seat in the 1917 Canadian federal election for the Unionists.

He was born in Terre Haute, Indiana, the son of John A. Carrick, and was educated at the University of Toronto. In 1899, he married Mary Jane Day. Carrick came to Port Arthur in 1903 attracted by a real estate boom in anticipation of the Grand Trunk Pacific Railway locating at the Lakehead. He subsequently acquired and marketed a large number of subdivisions on the fringes of the Port Arthur town plot, the most successful of which was Mariday Park, named after his wife. He launched the Port Arthur Daily News in 1906 to promote his political career and real estate business. He was president of the Great West Coal Company. He secured the rank of honorary lieutenant-colonel from the Canadian Minister of Militia, Sam Hughes during World War I and served as liaison officer to Canadian HQ staff.

Carrick relocated to Toronto after the First World War to run a brokerage business. He attempted to regain political office in Port Arthur, but was unsuccessful at the federal elections of October 1925 running as an Independent Conservative and again in 1930 running as a Mackenzie King Liberal.

His son Donald Carrick also served in the House of Commons.

The community of Carrick, Manitoba was named after him. His name is also associated with a subdivision in Thunder Bay and has a street named after him there in the Intercity area.

He was widowed in 1947.

According to his 1966 obituary in the Montréal Gazette, in about 1951 he moved to Mexico, saying that country had the ideal climate for "health, happiness and longevity." He died there in 1966.
