= Douglas Cameron (politician) =

Canadian politician

The Honourable Sir Douglas Colin Cameron KCMG
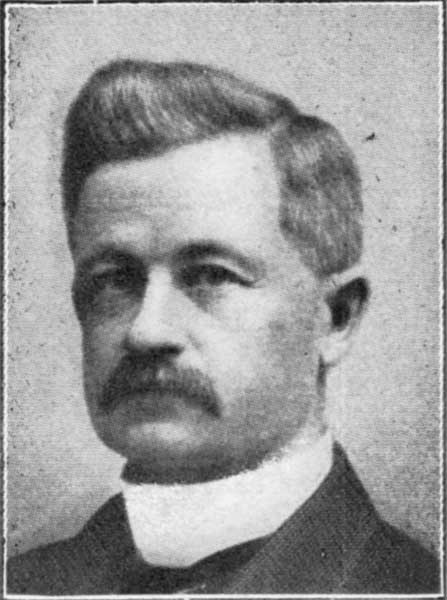

8th Lieutenant Governor of Manitoba
- In office August 1, 1911 – August 3, 1916
- Monarch: George V
- Governors General: The Earl Grey; The Duke of Connaught and Strathearn
- Premier: Rodmond Roblin; Tobias Norris
- Preceded by: Daniel Hunter McMillan
- Succeeded by: James Albert Manning Aikins

Personal details
- Born: June 8, 1854 Hawkesbury, Canada West
- Died: November 27, 1921 (aged 67) Toronto, Ontario
- Party: Liberal
- Other political affiliations: Liberal
- Relations: John Cameron (brother)

Sir Douglas Colin Cameron KCMG (June 8, 1854 – November 27, 1921) was a Canadian politician. He served in the Ontario Legislature from 1902 to 1905, and was the eighth Lieutenant Governor of Manitoba from 1911 to 1916.

Cameron was born in Hawkesbury, Canada West (now Ontario), and was educated at Vankleek Hill High School. He did not attend college. Cameron moved to Manitoba in 1878, and worked as a contractor at Brandon.

Cameron then moved to Rat Portage (now Kenora), which was claimed by both Manitoba and Ontario at the time. He oversaw developments in the lumbering and mining trades, opened a saw mill, and was one of the founders of the Maple Leaf Flour Mills. In later years, he would become President of Rat Portage Lumber Company.

Cameron entered politics in 1901, having been elected as a councillor in Rat Portage. He would later serve as the city's mayor. In 1902, he was elected to the Legislative Assembly of Ontario as a Liberal for the riding of Fort William and Lake of the Woods, defeating Conservative Thomas Smellie, 1483 votes to 1121. Cameron sat as a backbench supporter of Premier George Ross for the next three years.

The Liberals lost the election of 1905, and Cameron lost his own riding to Smellie, 1536 votes to 1228. Shortly thereafter, he moved to Winnipeg to better oversee his business ventures.

Cameron stood as a Liberal candidate for Winnipeg in the 1908 federal election, but lost to Conservative Alexander Haggart by 8747 votes to 6729.

Prime Minister Wilfrid Laurier appointed Cameron Lieutenant-Governor of Manitoba on August 1, 1911. The position was largely ceremonial by this time, and Cameron had little involvement in the day-to-day affairs of the province's government. In 1915, however, Cameron used his constitutional authority to call a Royal Commission of Enquiry into an ongoing scandal involving the construction costs of the province's new legislative buildings. The Commission upheld charges against Rodmond P. Roblin's government by the opposition Liberals, and Roblin was forced to resign.

Cameron was made a Knight Commander of the Order of St Michael and St George in the 1914 New Year Honours.

Cameron's term in office ended in 1916. He died in 1921.
