= James Conmee =

Canadian politician

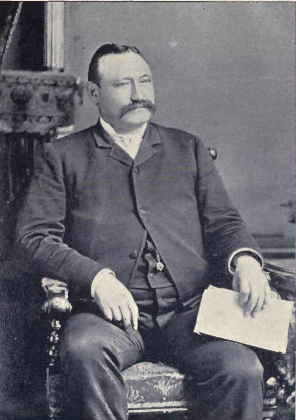

Member of Parliament for Thunder Bay and Rainy River
- In office 1904–1911
- Preceded by: New riding
- Succeeded by: John James Carrick

Ontario MPP
- In office 1902–1904
- Preceded by: New riding
- Succeeded by: Hugh W. Kennedy
- Constituency: Port Arthur and Rainy River
- In office 1885–1902
- Preceded by: New riding
- Succeeded by: Riding abolished
- Constituency: Algoma West

Personal details
- Born: October 13, 1848 Sydenham, Canada West
- Died: July 23, 1913 (aged 64) Prescott, Arizona, USA
- Party: Liberal
- Spouse: Emily Florence Cox (m. 1874)
- Occupation: Businessman

James Conmee (October 13, 1848 – July 23, 1913) was an Ontario businessman and political figure. He represented Algoma West from 1885 to 1902 and Port Arthur and Rainy River from 1902 to 1904 in the Legislative Assembly of Ontario and Thunder Bay and Rainy River in the House of Commons of Canada from 1904 to 1911 as a Liberal member.

== Biography ==
He was born in Sydenham Township, Canada West in 1848, the son of Irish immigrants Matthew Conmee and Rosanna O'Shaughnessey, the youngest of four children (three boys, one girl). Although his education was rudimentary and better educated political enemies mocked his grammatical skills, he became over time a skilled and formidable debater. James was underage when he and his brother John sought adventure and joined the 8th New York Cavalry Regiment 21 March 1865 at Rochester, New York. From about 1886, biographical sources like the Canadian Parliamentary Guide state that he served under General George Armstrong Custer, but the commander of the 8th New York Cavalry in 1865 was Colonel Edmund Mann Pope (1837-1906). The regiment was part of the 2nd Brigade, 3rd Cavalry Division, commanded by Brevet Major-General George A. Custer, from March 1865, and was disbanded 27 June 1865. In 1872, at the age of 22 he moved to Fort William to work at a sawmill on the Kaministiquia River. In 1874, he married Emily Florence Cox. From 1876 to 1877, he held the contract to deliver mail between Silver Islet and Pigeon River. He was a contractor involved in laying track for the Canadian Pacific Railway in northern Ontario, later working on contracts for the Port Arthur, Duluth and Western Railway, Algoma Central Railway and other railways in the region. The Bell Telephone Company squeezed out his attempt to secure a municipal telephone franchise when he established the Port Arthur (Ontario) Telephone Company in 1885, in alliance with the Toronto Telephone Manufacturing Company. He would later be involved in setting up other utility companies, the only one of which succeeded was the Port Arthur, Water, Light and Power Company. He also served as first President of the Ontario Mining Institute.

== Lawsuit ==
Conmee fought and eventually won a lawsuit launched against him and his partner John Donald McLennan by the Canadian Pacific Railway for defrauding the company on their Michipicoten contract. Both parties to the lawsuit hired the best lawyers available. The success and visibility of this case led to his meeting with Sir Wilfrid Laurier and they became best friends and confidants. Sir Wilfred introduced him on the floor of the House of Commons stating to the many lawyers elected that "here is a true lawyer". Laurier is said to have asked "Where did this Conmee come from, and how is it he can come here and teach the lawyers law?" Their friendship and collaboration continued until Conmee's death.

== Political career ==
In 1878, he became a tax collector for the Municipality of Shuniah. In 1879, Conmee was elected to the municipal council representing Prince Arthur's Landing ward in the Municipality of Shuniah. In 1885 he served as the second mayor of Port Arthur, Ontario, the same year the provincial constituency of Algoma was split into Algoma East and Algoma West. He was elected to represent Algoma West in the Legislative Assembly of Ontario and won every subsequent provincial election until 1904 when he switched to federal politics. Conmee ran unsuccessfully in 1896 for the Nipissing seat in the House of Commons before being elected in 1904 on a platform of supporting Sir Wilfrid Laurier's transcontinental railway policy which would bring enormous benefits to his constituency.

In 1911, Conmee retired from politics due to poor health related to tuberculosis and kidney afflictions. He could see the handwriting on the wall when Laurier and the Liberal Party lost the election of 1911. The younger and more dynamic John James Carrick was sure to win the seat for the Conservatives. Conmee died in Prescott, Arizona in 1913 and was buried at Port Arthur.

== Legacy ==
Conmee wrote the lyrics to a patriotic song, The national flag, with music by Henry Herbert Godfrey. This song represents one of the first "National Anthems" of Canada.

Mr. Conmee was an adventurer, entrepreneur, social advocate, and inventor. He attempted to introduce the first telephone system to the Head of the Lakes (or Canadian Lakehead) He understood the potential of hydro electric power long before it became common. He worked long into the night almost every night in a locked laboratory on various gadgets and inventions including the calculating weighscale. He purchased Nun's Island near Montreal on sight recognizing the potential of the Lachine Rapids for hydro electricity. He also explicitly requested and was given title to all the waters that fed into the Falls and Rapids in order to protect the potential hydro development. This extremely valuable asset was sold for a song when he believed that the purchaser could promote and develop hydro power quicker than he could and he did not want to stand in the way.

St. Joseph's Hospital in Port Arthur (now Thunder Bay) was established on land donated in the backyard of his homestead. He also provided or arranged all funding for the construction of the hospital. In a show of respect, the only portion of the hospital funded by the Nuns who ran it at the time is the entrance and plaque which still bears his name as of 2007. The heritage homestead was destroyed in 1968 to increase parking space - ironically about the same time as the popular tune about destroying paradise to put up a parking lot.

Conmee was able to secure federal funding to support the development of the Port Arthur harbour which played an important role in the later development of the city's economy.

Conmee Township west of Thunder Bay was named after him.
