= Jim Foulds =

Canadian politician (born 1937)

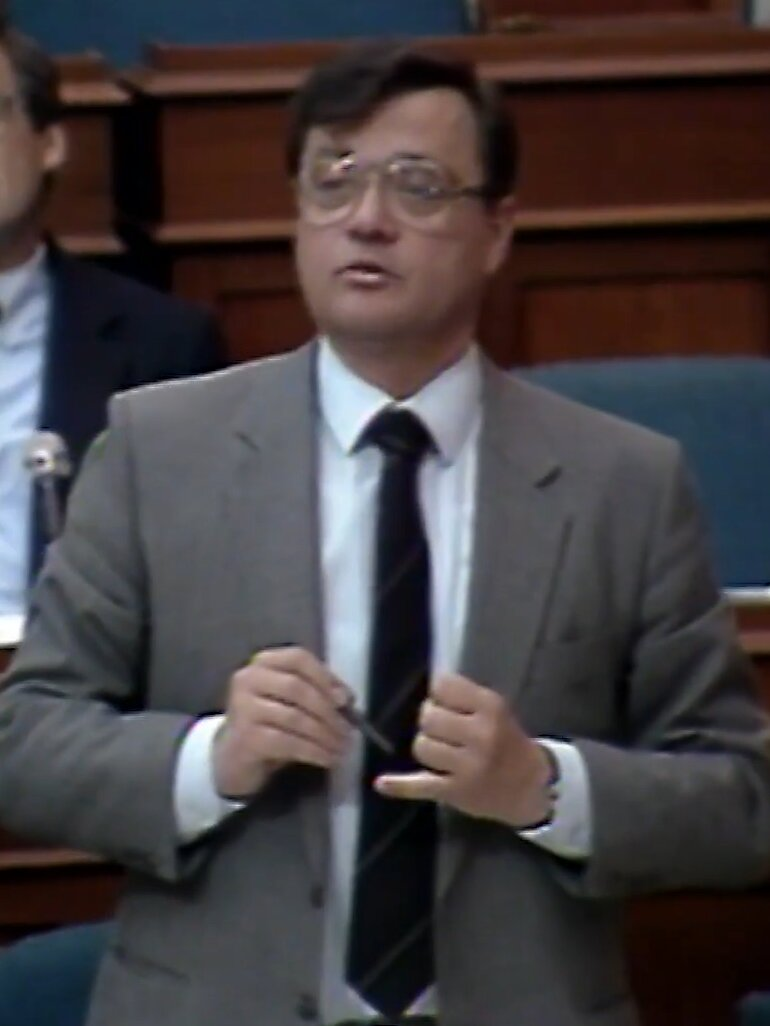
- Foulds in 1986

Ontario MPP
- In office 1971–1987
- Preceded by: Ron Knight
- Succeeded by: Taras Kozyra
- Constituency: Port Arthur

Personal details
- Born: April 10, 1937 (age 89) Port Arthur, Ontario
- Party: New Democrat
- Occupation: Teacher

James Francis Foulds (born April 10, 1937) is a former politician in Ontario, Canada. He was a New Democratic member in the Legislative Assembly of Ontario from 1971 to 1987.

== Background ==
Foulds was born in Port Arthur, Ontario (now Thunder Bay), Ontario, and educated at Lakehead Technical Institute and the University of British Columbia. He has been a member of the Canadian Civil Liberties Association. His son Andrew is currently a city councillor for Thunder Bay City Council.

== Politics ==
He was elected to the Ontario legislature in the 1971 provincial election, defeating Progressive Conservative candidate Charles Johnston by 1,369 votes in the riding of Port Arthur. He was re-elected by a greater margin in the 1975 election, and defeated PC candidate Allan Laakkonen by 339 votes in the 1977 election. He served as his party's Education critic from 1971 to 1977, when he became Natural Resources critic.

Foulds defeated Laakkonen again in the 1981 election, even though the NDP lost seats under the leadership of Michael Cassidy. The following year, he ran to succeed Cassidy as party leader in a leadership convention. He competed against front runner Bob Rae and left-wing candidate Richard Johnston. Foulds had the most experience and supported traditional party positions. However, neither he nor Johnston with his appeal to the left wing of the party could stop Rae's union backed bandwagon. He lost on the first ballot behind Rae (64.6%) and Johnston (24.4%) with 11.0% support. After the leadership convention, Foulds was named Deputy Leader.

Foulds was re-elected again in the 1985 election. The Progressive Conservatives, who had governed Ontario since 1943, were reduced to a tenuous minority government in this election, and were subsequently defeated in the legislature by an alliance of the Liberals and NDP. The Liberals formed government under David Peterson, and promised to implement some policies favoured by the NDP in return for support from that party in the legislature for two years. Foulds contributed to this accord by insisting that Peterson's Liberal implement travel grants for necessary medical travel for northern Ontarians. He served as Treasury critic and Northern Affairs critic from 1985 to 1987, and did not run for re-election in 1987.

== Later life ==
Foulds began teaching English at Westgate Collegiate and Vocational Institute in Thunder Bay. He has also taught a course in Ontario politics at Lakehead University since 1988.

Foulds remains active with the New Democratic Party, and supported Bill Blaikie for the federal party's leadership in 2003. In 2005, he published an editorial in the Ontario party's newsletter, arguing that voters should reject the arguments of right-wing politicians, and recognize that tax dollars and government intervention may be beneficial for society. If governments continue to pursue right-wing policies, he argues, "we’re going to see more homelessness, more private health care, more private education, more gated communities, and more danger to your family and mine."

Although some media initially reported that Foulds was re-entering politics in the 2007 Ontario election as the New Democratic candidate in Thunder Bay—Superior North, the candidate in 2007 was not the former MPP, but a cousin of his with the same first name.
