= Lyn McLeod =

Canadian politician and university administrator

The Honourable Lyn McLeod OOnt ECO

Chancellor of Lakehead University
- In office March 8, 2017 – 2021
- Preceded by: Derek Burney
- Succeeded by: Rita Deverell

Ontario MPP
- In office 1999–2003
- Preceded by: New riding
- Succeeded by: Bill Mauro
- Constituency: Thunder Bay—Atikokan
- In office 1987–1999
- Preceded by: Mickey Hennessy
- Succeeded by: Riding abolished
- Constituency: Fort William

Leader of the Ontario Liberal Party
- In office 1992–1996
- Preceded by: Jim Bradley
- Succeeded by: Dalton McGuinty

Leader of the Official Opposition
- In office 1992–1996
- Preceded by: Jim Bradley
- Succeeded by: Dalton McGuinty

Personal details
- Born: 1942 (age 83–84)
- Party: Liberal
- Spouse: Neil McLeod
- Occupation: University administrator

Lyn McLeod OOnt (born c. 1942) is a former politician in Ontario, Canada. She served in the Legislative Assembly of Ontario from 1987 to 2003. McLeod was a cabinet minister in the Liberal government of David Peterson from 1987 to 1990, and served as leader of the Ontario Liberal Party from 1992 to 1996.

== Background ==
McLeod graduated from the University of Manitoba and received a Master of Arts degree in Psychology from Lakehead University, in the Northern Ontario city of Thunder Bay. She was trustee on the Lakehead Board of Education for seventeen years and its chair for seven. McLeod was also appointed to the Board of Governors of Lakehead University in 1986.

She was married to the late Neil McLeod, a prominent Thunder Bay family physician.

== Political career ==
=== First term (1987–1990) ===
She was elected for the riding of Fort William in the provincial election of 1987, defeating incumbent Progressive Conservative Michael Hennessy by 1,463 votes. The Liberals won a landslide majority in this election and made several historical breakthroughs in Northern Ontario. McLeod was appointed Minister of Colleges and Universities on September 29, 1987. Following a cabinet shuffle on August 2, 1989, she was named Minister of Energy and Minister of Natural Resources.

The Liberals were upset by the New Democratic Party in the provincial election of 1990, although McLeod was able to retain her riding against a strong challenge from NDP candidate Dan Hutsul, winning by 1,345 votes. Unlike most other Liberal candidates in this election, McLeod was supported by prominent members from the Ontario Secondary School Teachers' Federation in her region.

==== Cabinet positions ====
Peterson ministry, Province of Ontario (1985–1990)
Cabinet posts (3)
Predecessor	Office	Successor
Bob Wong	Minister of Energy; 1989–1990	Jenny Carter
Vince Kerrio	Minister of Natural Resources; 1989–1990	Bud Wildman
Greg Sorbara	Minister of Colleges and Universities; 1987–1989	Sean Conway

=== Second term and Ontario Liberal Party Leadership (1990–1995) ===
Peterson personally lost his seat in the 1990 campaign, and the Liberal party went through a series of interim leaders before holding a leadership convention in early 1992. McLeod was one of six candidates for the position, and was widely regarded as the main challenger to frontrunner Murray Elston. She finished a strong second on the first ballot, and overtook Elston on the third with support from Steve Mahoney's delegates. McLeod's people had made a deal with second-tier leadership contender Charles Beer. The Elston camp had an unexpectedly large lead on the first ballot, as McLeod lent Beer some of her delegates to give him a respectable showing, and Elston's margin dropped significantly when the eliminated Beer threw his full support behind McLeod. McLeod finally defeated Elston by nine votes on the fifth ballot, becoming the first woman to lead a major party in Ontario.

=== 1995 provincial election campaign ===
With Bob Rae's NDP government being widely blamed for mishandling the major recession, McLeod's Liberals held a steady lead in the polls for most of the period from 1992 to 1995, and were generally expected to win the 1995 campaign. The party, however, damaged its credibility through a series of high-profile policy reversals in the period leading up to the election.

The most notable of these occurred when McLeod withdrew Liberal support for the proposed Equality Rights Statute Amendment Act (Bill 167), which would have granted same-sex couples most of the same rights as opposite-sex common law couples, introduced by the NDP government of Bob Rae in 1994. The legislation was defeated after the majority of Liberal MPPs and twelve NDP MPPs joined with the entire Progressive Conservative caucus in voting against it. Many regarded McLeod's decision as cynical and opportunistic, and some believe that it was intended to boost Liberal fortunes in rural areas following a by-election loss in the rural, socially conservative riding of Victoria—Haliburton. The result, however, was that the party earned a reputation for "flip-flopping" and inconsistency, while offending its socially progressive supporters.

McLeod also offended some immigrant voters, an electorally important group for Liberals, by criticizing the Rae government's handling of Somali refugee claims. Her intent was to draw attention to criminal gangs that were forcing Somalis to move to Ontario and defraud the provincial welfare system. Several, however, interpreted her criticisms as being directed toward the entire community.

During the campaign itself, McLeod further alienated many voters with an overly aggressive performance in the party leaders' debate, clashing with Premier Bob Rae and waving her party's platform before the cameras on several occasions. Prior to this performance, provincial Liberal support was regarded by many political insiders as soft and unsteady. After the debate, many voters who were previously leaning to the Liberals shifted to Mike Harris's Progressive Conservatives, who were in third place in the legislature. The Tories surpassed the Liberals to grab the swing in support away from the NDP and finished with a majority, while the Liberals finished with less support than the previous campaign and managed only 30 out of 130 seats.

McLeod herself was easily re-elected in Fort William, defeating Thunder Bay municipal councillor and Tory candidate Evelyn Dodds by over 8,000 votes. Some Liberals called on McLeod to step down after the election, and she announced her resignation as party leader two months later.

=== Third term (1995–1999) ===
McLeod remained a prominent Liberal MPP under new leader Dalton McGuinty, serving as education critic from 1996 to 1999. She was generally regarded as successful in this role, and proved an able opponent of Education Minister John Snobelen's restructuring policies.

=== Fourth term (1999–2003) ===
McLeod was re-elected by a landslide in the provincial election of 1999, in the redistributed riding of Thunder Bay—Atikokan. The Tories won the election with a reduced majority, and McLeod swapped shadow cabinet portfolios with Gerard Kennedy to serve as her party's health critic in the legislature that followed. She did not seek re-election in 2003.

== Later life ==
Following her retirement, McLeod was appointed to the newly founded Health Council of Canada. She also was named as the first chancellor of the University of Ontario Institute of Technology in June 2004, and is a vice-chair of the board of governors at Confederation College in Thunder Bay. In 2014, she was made a Member of the Order of Ontario in recognition for having "devoted her career to public service and continuing to be actively involved in community work around the issues of education and health care."

Preceded by New position	Chancellor; University of Ontario Institute of Technology; 2002–2008	Succeeded by Perrin Beatty
