= Ron Knight (politician) =

Canadian politician (1932–2021)

Ontario MPP
- In office 1967–1971
- Preceded by: George Wardrope
- Succeeded by: Jim Foulds
- Constituency: Port Arthur

Personal details
- Born: June 19, 1932 Windsor, Ontario, Canada
- Died: December 17, 2021 (aged 89) Barrie, Ontario, Canada
- Party: Liberal, 1967-1969; Independent, 1969-1971
- Occupation: Radio and television broadcaster

Ronald Henry Knight (June 19, 1932 – December 17, 2021) was a politician in Ontario, Canada. He was a member of the Legislative Assembly of Ontario, who represented the riding of Port Arthur from 1967 to 1971. He was elected as a Liberal in 1967 but in 1969 he announced that he was quitting the Liberal caucus to sit as an independent.

== Background ==
Knight was born in Windsor, Ontario in 1932. Knight was a radio and television broadcaster. His first radio broadcasting job was with Ottawa's largest radio station, CFRA, in 1954. He then held positions at stations in Rouyn Noranda, Pembroke and Fort William (now Thunder Bay). In 1961, he was hired by CKPR-TV, in Fort William, to broadcast the evening news, and he held that position until 1967. Even while serving as an MPP, Knight held a part-time position with Toronto radio station CHUM.

== Politics ==
Knight ran as the Liberal candidate in the 1967 provincial election. He defeated Progressive Conservative incumbent George Wardrope by 810 votes. He served as a member of the opposition behind leader Robert Nixon. In 1967 he gave his first speech as an MPP in Ojibway. Initially the speaker would not allow it but Premier Bill Davis supported Knight. On July 17, 1968 he complained that revenue from northern mining operations was not being reinvested in the north. Minister for Mines Allan Lawrence termed that complaint as "horse feathers". On the same day, Knight spoke in French in the legislature warning that a policy of bilingualism could give French speaking civil servants an unwarranted advantage. Five days later he voted for a motion to make the legislature bilingual because "he wanted to make it work". The motion passed unanimously.

In October 1969, Knight stood in the house and announced that he was leaving the Liberal party and would sit as an independent. He said, "From this day forward I will sit as a free member speaking under the protection of no party, Liberal, Conservative, New Democrat... I have had a falling out with all the parties, more particularly with the party system, or should I say the 'petty system'." Liberal leader Nixon was caught off guard by Knight's announcement. Nixon said, "I really didn't know what he was going to say. The allegations are all unfounded and I feel very badly that Ron felt he had to say them." Port Arthur Liberal manager Rod Clarke said he was delighted by the announcement. Clarke said that Knight never really represented the riding and called him "unfit for office."

== Later life ==
After leaving the legislature following the 1971 general election, Knight held positions at radio stations in Richmond Hill, Newmarket, and Barrie, finally retiring, in 1987, from CHAY-FM, in Barrie. Knight died in Barrie, Ontario in December 2021.
