= Charles William Jarvis =

Canadian banker and politician

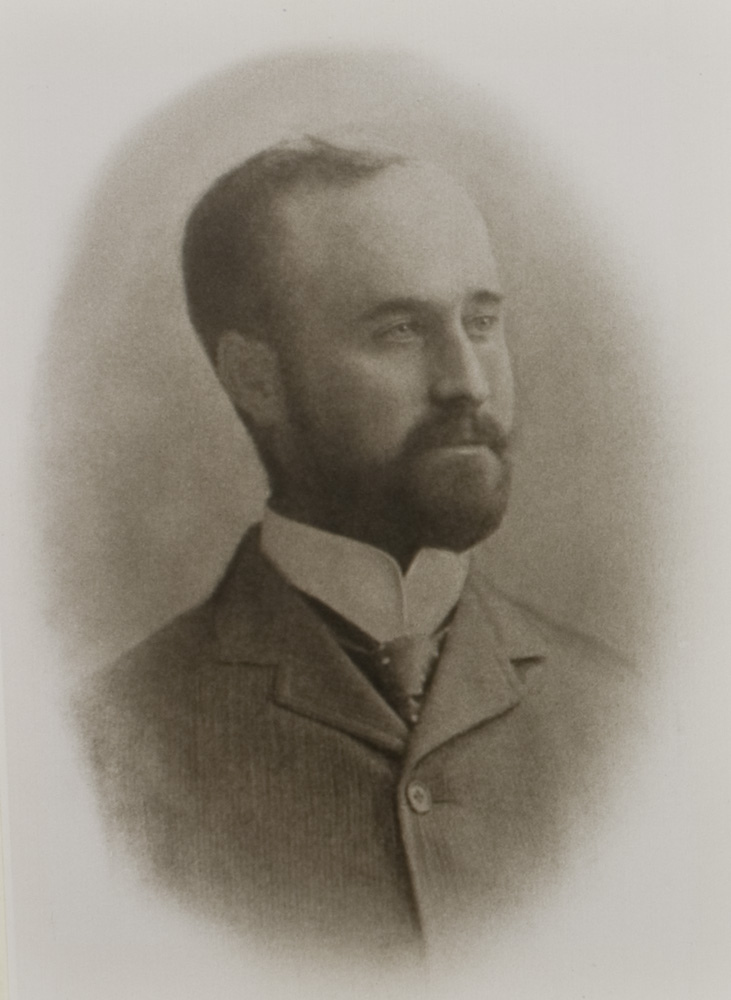

Ontario MPP
- In office 1911–1919
- Preceded by: Thomas Smellie
- Succeeded by: Harry Mills
- Constituency: Fort William

Mayor of Fort William, Ontario
- In office 1899–1900
- Preceded by: John McKellar
- Succeeded by: William Frederick Hogarth

Personal details
- Born: March 18, 1866 St. Eleanors, Prince County, Prince Edward Island
- Died: July 15, 1932 (aged 66) Fort William, Ontario
- Party: Conservative
- Spouse: Maria Louise Powley (m. 1892)

Charles William Jarvis (March 18, 1866 – July 15, 1932) was an Ontario banker and politician. Jarvis was the second mayor of the town of Fort William from 1899 to 1900, succeeding John McKellar. He represented Fort William in the Legislative Assembly of Ontario from 1911 to 1919 as a Conservative member.

He was born in St. Eleanors, Prince County, Prince Edward Island, the son of Henry Fitzgerald Jarvis and grandson of Edward James Jarvis, the first chief justice for Prince Edward Island. His brother Ernest Frederick Jarvis became assistant deputy minister of Militia during World War I. In 1892, he married Maria Louise Powley. He served as secretary for the Fort William Board of Trade and was chairman of the joint board responsible for governing the Port Arthur and Fort William Street Railway. He also served as the United States consular agent for the District of Thunder Bay from 1895 to 1913. He was appointed local master of titles and registrar of deeds in March 1928, a patronage appointment. Jarvis died at Fort William July 15, 1932. One of his sons W.H. Reginald Jarvis became president of the John Labatt brewery.
