= Garfield Anderson =

Canadian politician (1887–1965)

Ontario MPP
- In office 1943–1948
- Preceded by: Franklin Harford Spence
- Succeeded by: Charles Winnans Cox
- Constituency: Fort William

Personal details
- Born: May 7, 1887 Allenford, Ontario
- Died: June 1, 1965 (aged 78)
- Party: CCF
- Spouse: Laura Margaret Foster (m. 1912)
- Occupation: Barber

Garfield Anderson (May 7, 1887 – June 1, 1965) was an Ontario political figure. He represented Fort William in the Legislative Assembly of Ontario from 1943 to 1948 as a Co-operative Commonwealth Federation member.

He was born in Allenford, Ontario, the son of Duncan Anderson and Elizabeth Perkins. In 1912, he married Laura Margaret Foster. He worked as a barber, and also served as the director of a credit union and a consumer cooperative society. Anderson went overseas with the 141st Battalion during World War I. He served on the council for Fort William and was mayor from 1943 to 1948.
