= Ted Freeman (politician) =

Ontario Member of Provincial Parliament, 1963-1967

Ontario MPP
- In office 1963–1967
- Preceded by: John Boyle Chapple
- Succeeded by: Jim Jessiman
- Constituency: Fort William

Personal details
- Born: May 1, 1900 Deseronto, Ontario
- Died: October 9, 1986 (aged 86) Thunder Bay, Ontario
- Party: New Democrat
- Occupation: Salesman

Military service
- Allegiance: Canadian
- Branch/service: Army
- Years of service: 1917-1918

Edward George Freeman (May 1, 1900 – October 9, 1986) was a Canadian politician. He was a New Democratic Party (NDP) member of the Legislative Assembly of Ontario from 1963 to 1967, representing northern Ontario's riding of Fort William.

== Background ==
Freeman had lied about his age in order to enlist in the Canadian army and serve during World War I. He was decorated several times during the war. He was a salesman and moved to Fort William in 1935. Freeman was a long-serving member of the Loyal Order of Elk Lodge #82, in Fort William. He joined the Lodge in 1940 and held a variety of positions, culminating in his election, in 1959-1960, as the Grand Exalted Ruler of the Lodge.

== Politics ==
In the 1963 provincial election, Freeman ran as the New Democratic candidate in the riding of Fort William. He defeated Tory candidate Chris Asseff by 1,172 votes. Liberal incumbent John Chapple came in third. He served as an opposition member under the leadership of Donald MacDonald. In the 1967 election he was defeated by Tory candidate Jim Jessiman.
