= Joseph Edmund Crawford =

Canadian politician (1877–1964)

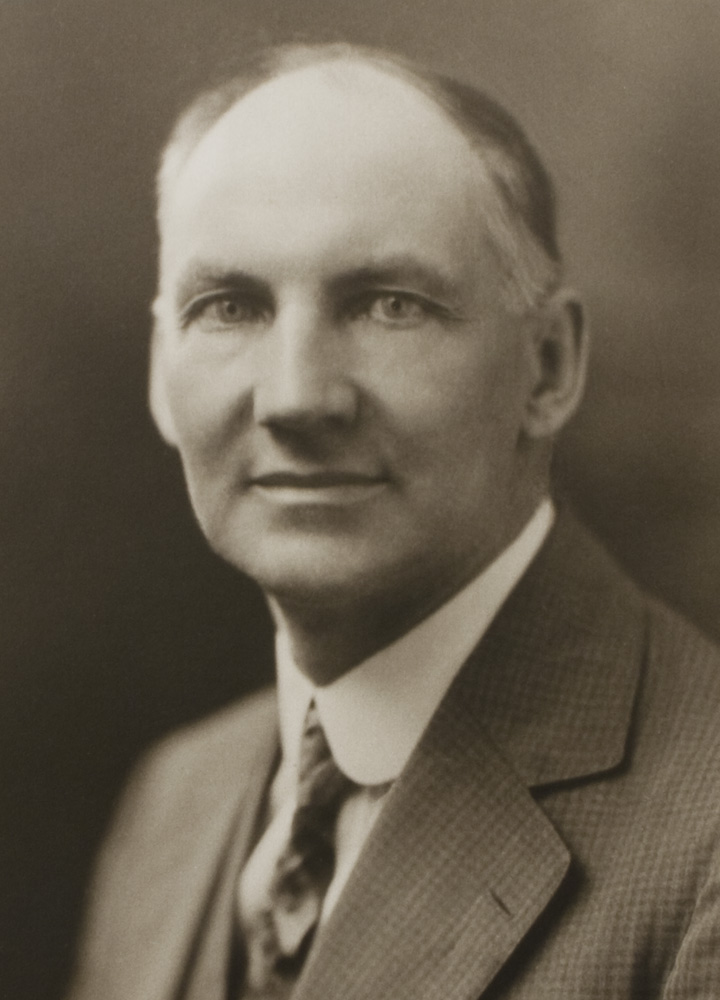
- Crawford circa 1926

Ontario MPP
- In office 1934–1937
- Preceded by: Franklin Harford Spence
- Succeeded by: Franklin Harford Spence
- Constituency: Fort William

Mayor of Fort William, Ontario
- In office 1926–1928
- Preceded by: Issac Newton Edmeston
- Succeeded by: Nathaniel Bascome Darrell

Personal details
- Born: December 2, 1877; Invermay, Bruce County, Ontario
- Died: October 9, 1964 (aged 86)
- Political party: Liberal
- Spouse: Jessie C. Baker (m. 1909)
- Occupation: Businessman

Joseph Edmund Crawford (December 2, 1877 – October 9, 1964) was an Ontario chartered accountant and political figure. He represented Fort William in the Legislative Assembly of Ontario from 1934 to 1937 as a Liberal member.

== Early life ==
He was born in Invermay, Bruce County, Ontario, the son of Robert Crawford. In 1909, he married Jessie C. Baker. After moving to Fort William, he lived for many years at 136 North Franklin Street in Fort William, nearby his sister Martha at 191 East Francis.

== Political career ==
He served on Fort William city council and was mayor from 1926 to 1928. Crawford was an unsuccessful candidate for a seat in the provincial assembly in 1929, but took 41% of the vote. He served on the Board of Education and was director of the local YMCA. He was president of the local Chamber of Commerce and vice-president of the Fort William Red Cross Society. Crawford also served as auditor of Thunder Bay Films, one of the few professional motion picture companies operating in Canada during the 1920s.

First elected in the Hepburn sweep of June 1934, he easily defeated Conservative Franklin Harford Spence 9100 votes to 5375, but when he opposed Hepburn's separate school legislation, he was challenged for the Liberal nomination by Roman Catholic Harry Murphy who ran in the October 1937 election as the official Liberal candidate. Crawford ran as an Independent Liberal, such that the Liberal vote split, permitting Frank Spence to retake the riding for the Conservatives.
