= Port Arthur (federal electoral district) =

Former federal electoral district in Ontario, Canada

Ontario electoral district

Defunct federal electoral district
- Legislature: House of Commons
- District created: 1933
- District abolished: 1976
- First contested: 1935
- Last contested: 1974

Port Arthur was a federal electoral district represented in the House of Commons of Canada from 1935 to 1979. It was located in the province of Ontario. This riding was created in 1933 from parts of Port Arthur—Thunder Bay riding.

It consisted initially of the parts of the territorial districts of Algoma, Cochrane, Kenora, and Thunder Bay not included in the electoral districts of Algoma West, Cochrane, Fort William, and Kenora-Rainy River herein defined, and including the city of Port Arthur, together with that part of the district of Patricia not included in the electoral districts of Kenora—Rainy River and Cochrane.

In 1966, it was defined as consisting of the part of the territorial district of Thunder Bay contained in the City of Port Arthur and the Townships of Adrian, Blackwell, Conmee, Forbes, Fowler, Goldie, Gorham, Horne, Jacques, Laurie, MacGregor, McIntyre, McTavish, Oliver, Sackville, Sibley and Ware.

The electoral district was abolished in 1976 when it was merged into Thunder Bay—Nipigon riding.

== Members of Parliament ==
Port Arthur has elected the following members of Parliament:

Parliament	Years	Member	Party
Riding created from Port Arthur—Thunder Bay
18th	1935–1940	C. D. Howe	Liberal
19th	1940–1945	C. D. Howe	Liberal
20th	1945–1949	C. D. Howe	Liberal
21st	1949–1953	C. D. Howe	Liberal
22nd	1953–1957	C. D. Howe	Liberal
23rd	1957–1958	Doug Fisher	Co-operative Commonwealth
24th	1958–1962	Doug Fisher	Co-operative Commonwealth
25th	1962–1963	Doug Fisher	New Democratic
26th	1963–1965	Doug Fisher	New Democratic
27th	1965–1968	Bob Andras	Liberal
28th	1968–1972	Bob Andras	Liberal
29th	1972–1974	Bob Andras	Liberal
30th	1974–1979	Bob Andras	Liberal
Riding dissolved into Thunder Bay—Nipigon

== Election results ==
1935 Canadian federal election: Port Arthur
Party	Candidate	Votes
Liberal	C. D. Howe	6,591
Conservative	George Wardrope	2,807
Co-operative Commonwealth	Alex Gibson	1,357
Communist	Albert Edward Smith	1,161
Reconstruction	Peter Allan Legrow	519

1940 Canadian federal election: Port Arthur
Party	Candidate	Votes
Liberal	C. D. Howe	10,327
National Government	Alan A. Barton	5,213
Co-operative Commonwealth	Alex Gibson	3,128

1945 Canadian federal election: Port Arthur
Party	Candidate	Votes
Liberal	C.D. Howe	10,045
Co-operative Commonwealth	John Arthur Thompson	5,504
Progressive Conservative	George Wardrope	3,516
Labor–Progressive	Robert Melbourne Aylward	1,004

1949 Canadian federal election: Port Arthur
Party	Candidate	Votes
Liberal	C. D. Howe	12,646
Co-operative Commonwealth	James Thomas Cawley	6,401
Progressive Conservative	Robert Ainslie Robinson	5,068
Social Credit	John Emil Dagsvik	627

1953 Canadian federal election: Port Arthur
Party	Candidate	Votes
Liberal	C. D. Howe	12,272
Co-operative Commonwealth	Ronald Vincent Wilmot	5,865
Progressive Conservative	Bob Robinson	5,415
Labor–Progressive	Bruce Magnuson	923

1957 Canadian federal election: Port Arthur
Party	Candidate	Votes
Co-operative Commonwealth	Doug Fisher	12,228
Liberal	C. D. Howe	10,813
Progressive Conservative	Ina M. Vigars	5,261

1958 Canadian federal election: Port Arthur
Party	Candidate	Votes
Co-operative Commonwealth	Doug Fisher	12,217
Progressive Conservative	Norman R. Wilson	10,215
Liberal	Edward V. Anten	9,043

1962 Canadian federal election: Port Arthur
Party	Candidate	Votes
New Democratic	Doug Fisher	13,437
Liberal	David W. Morgan	11,502
Progressive Conservative	Norman R. Wilson	9,226
Communist	Osmo R. Lahti	418
Social Credit	Gilbert Heath	352

1963 Canadian federal election: Port Arthur
Party	Candidate	Votes
New Democratic	Doug Fisher	16,141
Liberal	Saul Laskin	13,132
Progressive Conservative	Harvey W. Smith	6,316

1965 Canadian federal election: Port Arthur
Party	Candidate	Votes
Liberal	Bob Andras	14,706
New Democratic	Gordon Oliver Rothney	12,275
Progressive Conservative	Harvey Smith	8,075

1968 Canadian federal election: Port Arthur
Party	Candidate	Votes
Liberal	Bob Andras	11,079
New Democratic	Gordon Oliver Rothney	7,306
Progressive Conservative	Carl Rogers	4,179
Communist	Norman Freed	233

1972 Canadian federal election: Port Arthur
Party	Candidate	Votes
Liberal	Bob Andras	14,351
New Democratic	Chris Ferguson	6,756
Progressive Conservative	John Erickson	6,027
No affiliation	Clifford Wahl	274

1974 Canadian federal election: Port Arthur
Party	Candidate	Votes
Liberal	Bob Andras	14,523
New Democratic	Dusty Miller	8,591
Progressive Conservative	Frank Wright	3,322
Communist	Clifford Wahl	164
Marxist–Leninist	Janina Klee	54

== See also ==
- List of Canadian electoral districts
- Historical federal electoral districts of Canada
