= Jim Jessiman =

Canadian politician (1912–1989)

Ontario MPP
- In office 1967–1975
- Preceded by: Ted Freeman
- Succeeded by: Iain Angus
- Constituency: Fort William

Personal details
- Born: July 21, 1912 Thunder Bay, Ontario
- Died: June 7, 1989 (aged 76) Thunder Bay, Ontario
- Party: Progressive Conservative
- Occupation: Auto dealer

James Hugh Jessiman (July 21, 1912 – June 7, 1989) was a Canadian politician, who represented Fort William in the Legislative Assembly of Ontario from 1967 to 1975 as a Progressive Conservative member.

Jessiman was born in Fort William, Ontario, to James Munro Jessiman and Margaret Nichol.

Jessiman left an impressive legacy of community service, including the historical restoration of Old Fort William and construction of the Big Thunder National Ski Training Centre. He was chairman of the Ontario Northland Transportation Commission from 1972 to 1975. Jessiman served in the Royal Canadian Air Force from 1939 to 1945 and after the war established a successful auto dealership in Fort William.

Before his entry into provincial politics, he was active at the municipal level. He was a member of the Fort William parks and recreation department from 1954 to 1964. He was chairman for eight of those years. He was a city alderman between 1965 and 1967. He was responsible for the setting aside of land for the Chapples recreation area, as well as implementing a tree-planting policy for the city's boulevards.

He left his wife Margaret, one son William and two daughters Valerie and Diane.
