= Fort William (provincial electoral district) =

Ontario electoral district

Defunct provincial electoral district
- Legislature: Legislative Assembly of Ontario
- District created: 1908
- District abolished: 1999
- First contested: 1908
- Last contested: 1999

Demographics
- Census division: Thunder Bay District
- Census subdivision: Fort William → Thunder Bay

Fort William was a provincial electoral district in the Canadian province of Ontario, active from 1908 to 1999. The district was created out of the former Fort William and Lake of the Woods district for the 1908 election, serving the city of Fort William and the surrounding area. The former name referred to the Lake of the Woods.

When the city of Fort William merged with the neighbouring city of Port Arthur in 1970 to create the current city of Thunder Bay, the district of Fort William and the corresponding electoral district of Port Arthur continued as separate districts serving the new city.

For the 1999 provincial election, the government of Mike Harris redistributed provincial electoral districts to correspond to the same boundaries and names that were in use for the province's federal electoral districts. Fort William was merged at that time into the new district of Thunder Bay—Atikokan.

== Members of Provincial Parliament ==
| Assembly | Years | Member | Party |
|---|---|---|---|
Fort William and Lake of the Woods
| 10th | 1902–1905 | Douglas Cameron | Liberal |
| 11th | 1905–1908 | Thomas Smellie | Conservative |
Fort William
| 12th | 1908–1911 | Thomas Smellie | Conservative |
| 13th | 1911–1914 | Charles William Jarvis | Conservative |
| 14th | 1914–1919 | Charles William Jarvis | Conservative |
| 15th | 1919–1923 | Harry Mills | Labour |
| 16th | 1923–1926 | Franklin Harford Spence | Conservative |
| 17th | 1926–1929 | Franklin Harford Spence | Conservative |
| 18th | 1929–1934 | Franklin Harford Spence | Conservative |
| 19th | 1934–1937 | Joseph Edmund Crawford | Liberal |
| 20th | 1937–1943 | Franklin Harford Spence | Conservative |
| 21st | 1943–1945 | Garfield Anderson | Co-operative Commonwealth |
| 22nd | 1945–1948 | Garfield Anderson | Co-operative Commonwealth |
| 23rd | 1948–1951 | Charles Winnans Cox | Liberal |
| 24th | 1951–1955 | Clare Mapledoram | Progressive Conservative |
| 25th | 1955–1959 | Clare Mapledoram | Progressive Conservative |
| 26th | 1959–1963 | John Boyle Chapple | Liberal |
| 27th | 1963–1967 | Ted Freeman | New Democratic |
| 28th | 1967–1971 | Jim Jessiman | Progressive Conservative |
| 29th | 1971–1975 | Jim Jessiman | Progressive Conservative |
| 30th | 1975–1977 | Iain Angus | New Democratic |
| 31st | 1977–1981 | Mickey Hennessy | Progressive Conservative |
| 32nd | 1981–1985 | Mickey Hennessy | Progressive Conservative |
| 33rd | 1985–1987 | Mickey Hennessy | Progressive Conservative |
| 34th | 1987–1990 | Lyn McLeod | Liberal |
| 35th | 1990–1995 | Lyn McLeod | Liberal |
| 36th | 1995–1999 | Lyn McLeod | Liberal |
Sourced from the Ontario Legislative Assembly
Merged into Thunder Bay—Atikokan before the 1999 election

== Election results ==
1995 Ontario general election
| Party | Candidate | Votes | % | ±% |
|---|---|---|---|---|
| Liberal | Lyn McLeod | 15,681 | 57.32 | +12.88 |
| Progressive Conservative | Evelyn Dodds | 7,116 | 26.01 | +9.82 |
| New Democratic | Greg Laws | 4,561 | 16.67 | –22.70 |
| Total valid votes | | 27,358 | 99.04 | |
| Total rejected, unmarked and declined ballots | | 264 | 0.96 | –0.93 |
| Turnout | | 27,622 | 63.29 | +0.55 |
| Eligible voters | | 43,643 | | |
| Liberal hold | | Swing | | +1.53 |
Source: Elections Ontario

1990 Ontario general election
| Party | Candidate | Votes | % | ±% |
|---|---|---|---|---|
| Liberal | Lyn McLeod | 11,798 | 44.44 | +5.97 |
| New Democratic | Don Hutsul | 10,453 | 39.37 | +12.29 |
| Progressive Conservative | Harold Wilson | 4,300 | 16.20 | –17.23 |
| Total valid votes | | 26,551 | 98.12 | |
| Total rejected, unmarked and declined ballots | | 509 | 1.88 | +1.48 |
| Turnout | | 27,060 | 62.74 | –4.90 |
| Eligible voters | | 43,133 | | |
| Liberal hold | | Swing | | –3.16 |
Source: Elections Ontario

1987 Ontario general election
| Party | Candidate | Votes | % | ±% |
|---|---|---|---|---|
| Liberal | Lyn McLeod | 11,168 | 38.47 | +20.96 |
| Progressive Conservative | Mickey Hennessy | 9,705 | 33.43 | –21.23 |
| New Democratic | Don Smith | 7,861 | 27.08 | +0.33 |
| Communist | John MacLennan | 300 | 1.03 | –0.06 |
| Total valid votes | | 29,034 | 99.60 | |
| Total rejected ballots | | 117 | 0.40 | –0.11 |
| Turnout | | 29,151 | 67.63 | +3.86 |
| Eligible voters | | 43,101 | | |
| Liberal gain from Progressive Conservative | | Swing | | +10.31 |
Source: Elections Ontario

1985 Ontario general election
| Party | Candidate | Votes | % | ±% |
|---|---|---|---|---|
| Progressive Conservative | Mickey Hennessy | 14,452 | 54.66 | +0.34 |
| New Democratic | Don Smith | 7,071 | 26.74 | –4.86 |
| Liberal | Norris Badanai | 4,629 | 17.51 | +3.42 |
| Communist | John MacLennan | 289 | 1.09 | – |
| Total valid votes | | 26,441 | 99.49 | |
| Total rejected ballots | | 135 | 0.51 | +0.20 |
| Turnout | | 26,576 | 63.77 | +4.16 |
| Eligible voters | | 41,674 | | |
| Progressive Conservative hold | | Swing | | +2.60 |
Source: Elections Ontario

1981 Ontario general election
| Party | Candidate | Votes | % | ±% |
|---|---|---|---|---|
| Progressive Conservative | Mickey Hennessy | 13,038 | 54.32 | +8.04 |
| New Democratic | Paul Lannon | 7,585 | 31.60 | –6.14 |
| Liberal | Mike Burns | 3,381 | 14.09 | –1.35 |
| Total valid votes | | 24,004 | 99.70 | |
| Total rejected ballots | | 73 | 0.30 | –0.04 |
| Turnout | | 24,077 | 59.61 | –6.28 |
| Eligible voters | | 40,393 | | |
| Progressive Conservative hold | | Swing | | +7.09 |
Source: Elections Ontario

1977 Ontario general election
| Party | Candidate | Votes | % | ±% |
|---|---|---|---|---|
| Progressive Conservative | Mickey Hennessy | 12,230 | 46.28 | +13.49 |
| New Democratic | Iain Angus | 9,974 | 37.74 | +1.15 |
| Liberal | J. Richard O'Donnell | 4,080 | 15.44 | –14.26 |
| Communist | Clifford Wahl | 142 | 0.54 | –0.38 |
| Total valid votes | | 26,426 | 99.65 | |
| Total rejected ballots | | 92 | 0.35 | –0.20 |
| Turnout | | 26,518 | 65.89 | +1.34 |
| Eligible voters | | 40,247 | | |
| Progressive Conservative gain from New Democratic | | Swing | | +6.17 |
Source: Elections Ontario

1975 Ontario general election
| Party | Candidate | Votes | % | ±% |
|---|---|---|---|---|
| New Democratic | Iain Angus | 9,173 | 36.59 | +1.34 |
| Progressive Conservative | Jim Jessiman | 8,220 | 32.79 | –16.26 |
| Liberal | Dale Willoughby | 7,444 | 29.70 | +14.00 |
| Communist | Clifford Wahl | 230 | 0.92 | – |
| Total valid votes | | 25,067 | 99.46 | |
| Total rejected ballots | | 137 | 0.54 | +0.05 |
| Turnout | | 25,204 | 64.55 | –11.36 |
| Eligible voters | | 39,048 | | |
| New Democratic gain from Progressive Conservative | | Swing | | +8.80 |
Source: Elections Ontario

1971 Ontario general election
| Party | Candidate | Votes | % | ±% |
|---|---|---|---|---|
| Progressive Conservative | Jim Jessiman | 13,428 | 49.05 | +14.73 |
| New Democratic | David B. Hughes | 9,651 | 35.25 | +2.98 |
| Liberal | Dale Willoughby | 4,296 | 15.69 | –17.71 |
| Total valid votes | | 27,375 | 99.51 | |
| Total rejected ballots | | 136 | 0.49 | –0.34 |
| Turnout | | 27,511 | 75.91 | +0.15 |
| Eligible voters | | 36,243 | | |
| Progressive Conservative hold | | Swing | | +5.87 |
Source: Elections Ontario

1967 Ontario general election
| Party | Candidate | Votes | % | ±% |
|---|---|---|---|---|
| Progressive Conservative | Jim Jessiman | 7,744 | 34.32 | +2.08 |
| Liberal | Walter Assef | 7,536 | 33.40 | +3.09 |
| New Democratic | Ted Freeman | 7,282 | 32.28 | –5.17 |
| Total valid votes | | 22,562 | 99.16 | |
| Total rejected ballots | | 190 | 0.84 | +0.33 |
| Turnout | | 22,752 | 75.76 | +4.66 |
| Eligible voters | | 30,033 | | |
| Progressive Conservative gain from New Democratic | | Swing | | +3.63 |
Source: Elections Ontario

1963 Ontario general election
| Party | Candidate | Votes | % | ±% |
|---|---|---|---|---|
| New Democratic | Ted Freeman | 8,427 | 37.45 | +17.29 |
| Progressive Conservative | Christopher (Chris) Asseff | 7,255 | 32.24 | –3.77 |
| Liberal | John Boyle Chapple | 6,820 | 30.31 | –11.78 |
| Total valid votes | | 22,502 | 99.50 | |
| Total rejected ballots | | 114 | 0.50 | –0.52 |
| Turnout | | 22,616 | 71.10 | –3.67 |
| Eligible voters | | 31,809 | | |
| New Democratic gain from Liberal | | Swing | | +14.54 |
Source: Elections Ontario

1959 Ontario general election
| Party | Candidate | Votes | % | ±% |
|---|---|---|---|---|
| Liberal | John Boyle Chapple | 9,255 | 42.09 | +16.83 |
| Progressive Conservative | Clare Mapledoram | 7,919 | 36.01 | –10.77 |
| Co-operative Commonwealth | William Stanley Johnson | 4,434 | 20.16 | –5.78 |
| Independent | Hubert Limbrick | 382 | 1.74 | – |
| Total valid votes | | 21,990 | 98.97 | |
| Total rejected ballots | | 228 | 1.03 | –0.56 |
| Turnout | | 22,218 | 74.77 | +3.71 |
| Eligible voters | | 29,717 | | |
| Liberal gain from Progressive Conservative | | Swing | | +11.30 |
Source: Elections Ontario

1955 Ontario general election
| Party | Candidate | Votes | % | ±% |
|---|---|---|---|---|
| Progressive Conservative | Clare Mapledoram | 8,868 | 46.78 | +4.18 |
| Co-operative Commonwealth | William Stanley Johnson | 4,918 | 25.94 | +9.25 |
| Liberal | Irvin Rechtshaffen | 4,788 | 25.26 | –13.52 |
| Labor–Progressive | Arnold Vesterback | 383 | 2.02 | – |
| Total valid votes | | 18,957 | 98.42 | |
| Total rejected ballots | | 305 | 1.58 | +0.78 |
| Turnout | | 19,262 | 71.05 | –1.55 |
| Eligible voters | | 27,109 | | |
| Progressive Conservative hold | | Swing | | –2.53 |
Source: Elections Ontario

1951 Ontario general election
| Party | Candidate | Votes | % | ±% |
|---|---|---|---|---|
| Progressive Conservative | Clare Mapledoram | 8,057 | 42.60 | +13.28 |
| Liberal | Charles Winnans Cox | 7,335 | 38.78 | +2.85 |
| Co-operative Commonwealth | George R. Fawcett | 3,157 | 16.69 | –18.06 |
| Independent | Alfred Batters | 366 | 1.93 | – |
| Total valid votes | | 18,915 | 99.19 | |
| Total rejected ballots | | 154 | 0.81 | +0.01 |
| Turnout | | 19,069 | 72.60 | –0.87 |
| Eligible voters | | 26,266 | | |
| Progressive Conservative gain from Liberal | | Swing | | +15.67 |
Source: Elections Ontario

1948 Ontario general election
| Party | Candidate | Votes | % | ±% |
|---|---|---|---|---|
| Liberal | Charles Winnans Cox | 6,860 | 35.93 | +12.44 |
| Co-operative Commonwealth | Garfield Anderson | 6,635 | 34.75 | –7.12 |
| Progressive Conservative | Roy Stanley Kirkup | 5,596 | 29.31 | +0.67 |
| Total valid votes | | 19,091 | 99.20 | |
| Total rejected ballots | | 153 | 0.80 | +0.02 |
| Turnout | | 19,244 | 73.47 | –0.21 |
| Eligible voters | | 26,192 | | |
| Liberal gain from Co-operative Commonwealth | | Swing | | +5.89 |
Source: Elections Ontario

1945 Ontario general election
| Party | Candidate | Votes | % | ±% |
|---|---|---|---|---|
| Co-operative Commonwealth | Garfield Anderson | 8,197 | 41.88 | –18.48 |
| Progressive Conservative | Robert A. Keane | 5,607 | 28.65 | +7.27 |
| Liberal | Frederick V. Kelly | 4,598 | 23.49 | +5.22 |
| Labor–Progressive | Charles Weir | 1,171 | 5.98 | – |
| Total valid votes | | 19,573 | 99.23 | |
| Total rejected ballots | | 152 | 0.77 | –0.08 |
| Turnout | | 19,725 | 73.68 | +7.61 |
| Eligible voters | | 26,771 | | |
| Co-operative Commonwealth hold | | Swing | | –12.88 |
Source: Elections Ontario

1943 Ontario general election
| Party | Candidate | Votes | % | ±% |
|---|---|---|---|---|
| Co-operative Commonwealth | Garfield Anderson | 8,701 | 60.36 | +49.61 |
| Progressive Conservative | Roy Stanley Kirkup | 3,081 | 21.37 | –18.55 |
| Liberal | Campbell Hanna | 2,634 | 18.27 | –18.21 |
| Total valid votes | | 14,416 | 99.15 | |
| Total rejected ballots | | 123 | 0.85 | –0.62 |
| Turnout | | 14,539 | 66.07 | –13.66 |
| Eligible voters | | 22,006 | | |
| Co-operative Commonwealth gain from Conservative | | Swing | | +33.91 |
Source: Elections Ontario

1937 Ontario general election
| Party | Candidate | Votes | % | ±% |
|---|---|---|---|---|
| Conservative | Franklin Harford Spence | 5,731 | 39.93 | +2.79 |
| Liberal | Harry Murphy | 5,236 | 36.48 | –26.39 |
| Independent Liberal | Joseph Edmund Crawford | 1,845 | 12.85 | –50.01 |
| Co-operative Commonwealth | E. A. Miles | 1,542 | 10.74 | – |
| Total valid votes | | 14,354 | 98.53 | |
| Total rejected ballots | | 214 | 1.47 | +0.57 |
| Turnout | | 14,568 | 79.73 | –2.70 |
| Eligible voters | | 18,272 | | |
| Conservative gain from Liberal | | Swing | | +14.59 |
Source: Elections Ontario

1934 Ontario general election
| Party | Candidate | Votes | % | ±% |
|---|---|---|---|---|
| Liberal | Joseph Edmund Crawford | 9,100 | 62.87 | +21.60 |
| Conservative | Franklin Harford Spence | 5,375 | 37.13 | –21.60 |
| Total valid votes | | 14,475 | 99.10 | |
| Total rejected ballots | | 132 | 0.90 | –0.19 |
| Turnout | | 14,607 | 82.43 | +19.91 |
| Eligible voters | | 17,720 | | |
| Liberal gain from Conservative | | Swing | | +21.60 |
Source: Elections Ontario

1929 Ontario general election
| Party | Candidate | Votes | % | ±% |
|---|---|---|---|---|
| Conservative | Franklin Harford Spence | 5,467 | 58.73 | –17.37 |
| Liberal | Joseph Edmund Crawford | 3,841 | 41.27 | +17.37 |
| Total valid votes | | 9,308 | 98.91 | |
| Total rejected ballots | | 103 | 1.09 | +0.66 |
| Turnout | | 9,411 | 62.52 | +11.96 |
| Eligible voters | | 15,053 | | |
| Conservative hold | | Swing | | –17.37 |
Source: Elections Ontario

1926 Ontario general election
| Party | Candidate | Votes | % | ±% |
|---|---|---|---|---|
| Conservative | Franklin Harford Spence | 5,286 | 76.10 | +36.16 |
| Liberal | Ira D. Evans | 1,660 | 23.90 | +7.85 |
| Total valid votes | | 6,946 | 99.57 | |
| Total rejected ballots | | 30 | 0.43 | –0.60 |
| Turnout | | 6,976 | 50.56 | –7.40 |
| Eligible voters | | 13,797 | | |
| Conservative hold | | Swing | | +22.00 |
Source: Elections Ontario

1923 Ontario general election
| Party | Candidate | Votes | % | ±% |
|---|---|---|---|---|
| Conservative | Franklin Harford Spence | 2,866 | 39.94 | +22.10 |
| Labour | Harry Mills | 2,658 | 37.04 | –14.44 |
| Liberal | B. O. Allen | 1,152 | 16.05 | –14.63 |
| Independent | D. R. Byers | 500 | 6.97 | – |
| Total valid votes | | 7,176 | 98.97 | |
| Total rejected ballots | | 75 | 1.03 | –1.88 |
| Turnout | | 7,251 | 57.97 | –8.02 |
| Eligible voters | | 12,509 | | |
| Conservative gain from Labour | | Swing | | – |
Source: Elections Ontario

Ontario provincial by-election, July 19, 1920 Ministerial by-election
| Party | Candidate | Votes |
|---|---|---|
| Labour | Harry Mills | acclaimed |
Source: Elections Ontario

1919 Ontario general election
| Party | Candidate | Votes | % | ±% |
|---|---|---|---|---|
| Labour | Harry Mills | 3,745 | 51.48 | – |
| Liberal | Archibald McGillivray | 2,232 | 30.68 | –13.69 |
| Conservative | Charles William Jarvis | 1,298 | 17.84 | –37.79 |
| Total valid votes | | 7,275 | 97.42 | |
| Total rejected ballots | | 193 | 2.58 | –1.01 |
| Turnout | | 7,468 | 63.70 | –2.94 |
| Eligible voters | | 11,723 | | |
| Labour gain from Conservative | | Swing | | +6.84 |
Source: Elections Ontario

1914 Ontario general election
| Party | Candidate | Votes | % | ±% |
|---|---|---|---|---|
| Conservative | Charles William Jarvis | 2,385 | 55.63 | +12.10 |
| Liberal | Walter F. Hogarth | 1,902 | 44.37 | +8.95 |
| Total valid votes | | 4,287 | 96.40 | |
| Total rejected ballots | | 160 | 3.60 | +2.06 |
| Turnout | | 4,447 | 66.64 | +14.60 |
| Eligible voters | | 6,673 | | |
| Conservative hold | | Swing | | +10.52 |
Source: Elections Ontario

1911 Ontario general election
| Party | Candidate | Votes | % | ±% |
|---|---|---|---|---|
| Conservative | Charles William Jarvis | 1,363 | 43.53 | –17.52 |
| Liberal | James Tonkin | 1,109 | 35.42 | –3.52 |
| Independent | Joseph Martin | 659 | 21.05 | – |
| Total valid votes | | 3,131 | 98.46 | |
| Total rejected ballots | | 49 | 1.54 | –0.86 |
| Turnout | | 3,180 | 52.04 | –15.34 |
| Eligible voters | | 6,111 | | |
| Conservative hold | | Swing | | +10.52 |
Source: Elections Ontario

1908 Ontario general election
| Party | Candidate | Votes | % | ±% |
|---|---|---|---|---|
| Conservative | Thomas Smellie | 1,317 | 61.06 | +5.49 |
| Liberal | William Henry Hamilton | 840 | 38.94 | –5.49 |
| Total valid votes | | 2,157 | 97.60 | |
| Total rejected ballots | | 53 | 2.40 | +0.66 |
| Turnout | | 2,210 | 67.38 | +13.28 |
| Eligible voters | | 3,280 | | |
| Conservative hold | | Swing | | +5.49 |
Source: Elections Ontario

=== Fort William and Lake of the Woods (1902–1908) ===
1905 Ontario general election: Fort William and Lake of the Woods
| Party | Candidate | Votes | % | ±% |
|---|---|---|---|---|
| Conservative | Thomas Smellie | 1,536 | 55.57 | +12.52 |
| Liberal | Douglas Cameron | 1,228 | 44.43 | –12.52 |
| Total valid votes | | 2,764 | 98.68 | |
| Total rejected ballots | | 37 | 1.32 | –0.23 |
| Turnout | | 2,801 | 45.06 | –7.72 |
| Eligible voters | | 6,216 | | |
| Conservative gain from Liberal | | Swing | | +12.52 |
Source: Elections Ontario

1902 Ontario general election: Fort William and Lake of the Woods
| Party | Candidate | Votes | % |
|---|---|---|---|
| Liberal | Douglas Cameron | 1,483 | 56.95 |
| Conservative | Thomas Smellie | 1,121 | 43.05 |
| Total valid votes | | 2,604 | 98.45 |
| Total rejected ballots | | 41 | 1.55 |
| Turnout | | 2,645 | 52.78 |
| Eligible voters | | 5,011 | |
| Liberal pickup new district. | | | |
Source: Elections Ontario
