= Doug Fisher (politician) =

Canadian politician (1919–2009)

Douglas Fisher
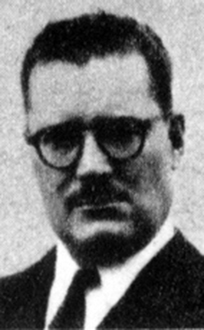

Member of the Canadian Parliament for Port Arthur
- In office 1957–1965
- Preceded by: C. D. Howe
- Succeeded by: Bob Andras

Personal details
- Born: September 19, 1919 Sioux Lookout, Ontario
- Died: September 18, 2009 (aged 89) Ottawa, Ontario
- Party: Co-operative Commonwealth Federation, New Democratic Party
- Occupation: Teacher, journalist

Douglas Mason Fisher (September 19, 1919 – September 18, 2009) was a Canadian political columnist and politician.

== Life and career ==
The long-time dean of the Parliamentary press gallery in Ottawa, Fisher was born in Sioux Lookout, Ontario, the son of Roy W. Fisher and Eva Pearl Mason, and worked at various jobs, including as a miner and forest ranger, before enlisting in the Canadian Army's 12th Armoured Car Regiment of the 12th Manitoba Dragoons during World War II. He landed at Normandy following D-Day and fought through northwestern Europe until reaching Germany. Returning to Canada after the war, he enrolled at the University of Toronto through a veteran's program and studied history and library science. After graduating, he worked as a librarian at Queen's University at Kingston before returning to northern Ontario to work as a librarian at Lakehead Technical Institute and then teach history at Port Arthur Collegiate Institute.

=== Member of Parliament ===
He entered politics with his upset victory in the 1957 general election as a candidate for the Co-operative Commonwealth Federation (CCF). He won over Liberal Cabinet minister C.D. Howe, the "minister of everything" in the governments of William Lyon Mackenzie King and Louis St. Laurent.

As CCF Member of Parliament (MP) for Port Arthur, Ontario, Fisher was an active member of the House during the 1957-1958 minority government. He quickly became knowledgeable both of parliamentary rules and personalities.

Re-elected in 1958 with an increased majority, Fisher was one of only a handful of CCFers elected in the general election that returned a crushing Progressive Conservative majority government, led by John Diefenbaker. The CCF, nearly wiped out, began to debate a relaunch of the social democratic movement in Canada by formally integrating the party with the Canadian Labour Congress trade union movement. At the 1960 CCF national convention in Regina, Fisher, along with the interim leader of the CCF, Hazen Argue, resisted the transition into what was to become the New Democratic Party, arguing against making labour too strong within the movement. On August 11, 1960, Fisher ran for vice president of the CCF in a bid to unseat Stanley Knowles, who was one of the architects of the New Party proposal, but was soundly defeated.

When the new party became a fait accompli, Fisher supported Argue in his bid to lead the NDP. Argue lost, and crossed the floor to the Liberals. Fisher remained in the party and became an NDP MP, although he increasingly found himself at odds with the rest of the NDP caucus, and saw himself on the right wing of the party.

After the 1963 election saw the defeat of David Lewis, who had been Deputy Leader of the New Democratic Party, Doug Fisher became Deputy Leader.

=== Journalism ===
Economic pressures ensued as MPs were only paid $10,000 a year at the time and Fisher needed to support a growing family. Offered a job by Toronto Telegram publisher John W. H. Bassett, he began freelancing as a political columnist in 1961 while sitting as an MP.

Finding journalism more rewarding than politics, Fisher retired from the House of Commons prior to the 1965 general election after eight years as an MP. He remained on Parliament Hill as a full-time parliamentary columnist. In the 1968 general election, Fisher reconciled with the NDP, and attempted a political comeback as the party's candidate in the suburban Toronto riding of York Centre, but came in second to the Liberal candidate.

When the Telegram folded in 1971, Fisher joined the upstart Toronto Sun as its Ottawa columnist. He remained a columnist for the Sun chain of newspapers until his retirement in 2006. With almost a half-century of his life spent in and covering Parliament, Fisher was considered the dean of political writers in Canada.

Fisher also worked for more than 30 years as host of a Sunday night TV show, Insight, on Ottawa's CJOH-TV and made regular appearances on CTV’s Question Period.

=== Sports ===
In 1969, Fisher co-authored a federal task report on sport. In the 1970s, he was appointed by the government to serve on the boards of Hockey Canada, the Coaching Association of Canada, and the Sports Information Centre.

He was a director of Hockey Canada from 1971 to 1978, and chair from 1974 to 1977, and played a role in organizing the 1972 Summit Series between Team Canada and the Soviet national hockey team and in founding the Canada Cup international ice hockey tournament in 1976.

He was a director of Canada’s Sports Hall of Fame from 1974 to 1992.

In 1975, he co-authored Canada's Sporting Heroes.

From 1979 to 1980, Fisher worked as a one-man provincial commission of inquiry reporting into the state and the future needs of recreation and sport in Ontario.

=== Family ===
In 1948, Fisher married Barbara Elizabeth Lamont (1922-2017), the daughter of a clergyman whom he met while they were both studying to become librarians. They eventually got divorced.

They had five sons: Matthew, Mark, Luke, John and Tobias. Matthew Fisher was a foreign correspondent for the National Post. Tobias Fisher worked for the Canadian Broadcasting Corporation and was the network's parliamentary assignment editor.

=== Awards ===
Fisher was the recipient of the 2001 Distinguished Service Award of the Canadian Association of Former Parliamentarians, "presented annually to a former parliamentarian who has made an outstanding contribution to the country and its democratic institutions."

=== Retirement and death ===
Fisher retired at the age of 86, due to declining health. His last column appeared on July 30, 2006. He died on September 18, 2009, only one day shy of his 90th birthday.
