= William Alfred Preston =

Canadian politician (1848–1944)

Ontario MPP
- In office 1908–1911
- Preceded by: New riding
- Succeeded by: James Arthur Mathieu
- Constituency: Rainy River
- In office 1907–1908
- Preceded by: Hugh W Kennedy
- Succeeded by: John James Carrick (Note: Succeeded Preston in new riding of Port Arthur.)
- Constituency: Port Arthur and Rainy River

Personal details
- Born: July 26, 1848 Bethany, Ontario
- Died: August 22, 1944 (aged 96) Winnipeg, Manitoba
- Party: Conservative
- Spouse: Jessie Sinclair Christie (m. 1874)
- Occupation: Merchant

William Alfred Preston (July 26, 1848 – August 22, 1944) was a Canadian politician, who served as a Member of Provincial Parliament in Ontario from 1907 to 1911.

== Biography ==
William Preston was born July 26, 1848, in Bethany, Manvers Township, Durham County, Ontario. He was the son of Major Isaac Preston Jr. (New Amsterdam, New York; Amherst Island, ON, Manvers Township, ON, and Vancouver, BC) and Mary Anne Woodside (Bellin, County Londonderry, Ireland, and Amherst Island, ON.)

Preston was a merchant at Prince Arthur's Landing from 1875 to 1879 where some of his Woodside kin resided. He was acclaimed a councillor for the South Ward of Prince Arthur's Landing in the Municipality of Shuniah 1876/77-1877/78, then was elected at a by-election 10 June 1879 for Crooks Ward. He then became a railway contractor, and in later years was heavily involved in gold mining.

He was elected to the Ontario Legislature in 1905 as the (Conservative) member for the riding of Port Arthur and Rainy River and then re-elected in 1908 as the member for Rainy River. After James Arthur Mathieu won the Conservative nomination in 1911, Preston chose to run as a Liberal and was defeated.

He, along with others, had applied for a charter to form the Rainy Lake Pulp and Paper Company in Fort Frances.

After living in California for a number of years, he returned to Winnipeg to live with his daughter Olive Elliott. He died in 1944 in Winnipeg, Manitoba.
