= Victorian Order of Nurses =

Canadian non-profit organization

The Victorian Order of Nurses (VON) is a non-profit charitable organization founded on January 29, 1897, and based in Ottawa, Ontario, Canada. It was created as a gift for Queen Victoria for the purposes of home care and social services. It is registered as a charity with the Canada Revenue Agency, under charity number 129482493RR0001. Since 2014, the president and CEO is Jo-Anne Poirier.

== History ==
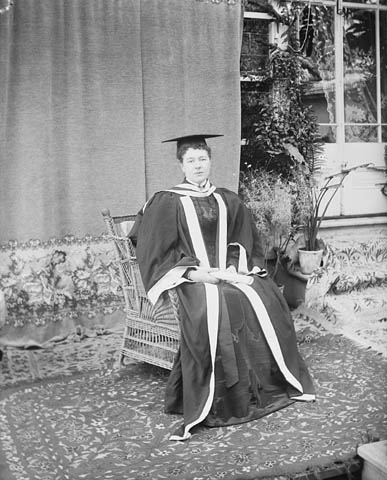
Founder Lady Aberdeen was the first woman to receive an honorary degree in Canada. She is shown here in Queen's University robes, photographed by William James Topley, in May 1897.

Lady Aberdeen, wife of Canadian Governor General Lord Aberdeen, visited Vancouver, British Columbia, in 1896. While there, she heard many stories of women and children alone in remote areas of Canada as their husbands had to travel great distances for medical help. At a meeting of the National Council for Women in Halifax, Nova Scotia, she was asked to create an order of visiting nurses in Canada. It was to be a memorial for the 60th anniversary of Queen Victoria's ascent to the throne of the British Empire. At Rideau Hall on February 10, 1897, Prime Minister Sir Wilfrid Laurier hosted an inauguration to create the Victorian Order of Nurses "as a mode of commemoration by the Dominion of Canada (Canada) of the Queen's Diamond Jubilee". In 1898, the first nurse training program was established for the Victorian Order of Nurses in Ottawa, Ontario.

In 1898, one of the first high-profile projects for the VON was a call to women to join the Victorian Order of Nurses' Klondike contingent. Candidates had to be unmarried, at least twenty-eight years old, and be a graduate of a recognized nursing school. They were warned they would have to dress very plainly and not curl or crimp their hair. Four nurses were selected, three Canadians and one recent immigrant from England. They reached Dawson one month after the Sisters of Saint Anne and found their skills desperately needed to care for the many victims of the typhoid epidemic that was raging through the Klondike.

The VON has helped Canada through many incidents including World War I, the Halifax Explosion and World War II. More importantly, VON has been an important element of building community, creating opportunities for people to work together to meet their needs and those of their friends and neighbours.

As of 2005, the VON, as it is known in Canada, was the largest single national homecare organization. With a staff of more than 7,000 supported by more than 14,000 volunteers, it provides services to Canadians daily.

VON Canada is structured into a national service provider and local charities. Both are governed by volunteer Board members. The National Board is composed of dedicated volunteers from across Canada elected by the representatives of the local branches. The local branches operate in each of their communities, raising funds and lobbying to meet specific needs.

On November 25, 2015, VON suddenly shut down all their operations outside of Ontario and Nova Scotia. The order was lacking in funding, and could no longer support operating offices in other areas. It will restructure to determine what services will continue to be offered while being financially viable.

== Arms ==
Coat of arms of Victorian Order of Nurses
Notes Granted 30 December 1991. Crest An antique lamp Argent enflamed Or and Azure charged with a representation of the Royal Cypher of Her Late Majesty Queen Victoria Azure. Escutcheon Tierced in chevron reversed Bleu Céleste Argent and Azure. Motto Health For All - La Santé Pour Tous

== See also ==
- Elizabeth Lawrie Smellie
- Queen's Nursing Institute, England, Wales, and Northern Ireland
- James Thorburn (Canadian physician)
