= George Wardrope =

Canadian politician (1899–1980)

Ontario MPP
- In office 1951–1967
- Preceded by: Fred Robinson
- Succeeded by: Ron Knight
- Constituency: Port Arthur

Personal details
- Born: November 2, 1899; Montreal, Quebec
- Died: January 1, 1980 (aged 80); Thunder Bay, Ontario
- Political party: Progressive Conservative
- Spouse: Blanche Mabel Senbolt
- Occupation: Insurance broker

George Calvin Wardrope (November 2, 1899 – January 1, 1980) was a politician in Ontario, Canada. He served as a Progressive Conservative member of the Legislative Assembly of Ontario from 1951 to 1967. He was a member of cabinet in the governments of Leslie Frost and John Robarts.

== Background ==
He was born in Montreal, the son of John W. Wardrope and educated at the University of Toronto. Wardrope operated an insurance and real estate agency in Port Arthur. He was also president of the Steep Rock Lumber Company and served on the city council for Port Arthur. In 1947, he married Blanche Mabel Senbolt.

== Politics ==
Wardrope was an unsuccessful candidate for the federal seat in 1935 and the provincial seat in 1948. He was elected to the Legislative Assembly of Ontario as a Progressive Conservative for the northern Ontario riding of Port Arthur in the 1951 provincial election. In December 1958, he was appointed to cabinet as Minister of Reform Institutions.

He was a candidate in the 1961 Progressive Conservative leadership convention, placing last with 45 votes. He was subsequently appointed to the Cabinet by the new Premier of Ontario, John Robarts as Minister of Mines. He held this position until he was defeated in the 1967 election by radio broadcaster Ron Knight. Knight defeated him by 810 votes.

Wardrope attempted to win a seat in the House of Commons of Canada in the 1968 federal election, but was defeated in the riding of Thunder Bay. He placed third behind Liberal Keith Penner and the New Democratic Party candidate.

In 1969 he was elected to serve on the first City Council of the new city of Thunder Bay, which took office on January 1, 1970.

=== Cabinet positions ===
Ontario provincial government of John Robarts
Cabinet post (1)
| Predecessor | Office | Successor |
| James Maloney | Minister of Mines; 1961–1967 | Allan Lawrence |
Ontario provincial government of Leslie Frost
Cabinet post (1)
| Predecessor | Office | Successor |
| Matthew Dymond | Minister of Reform Institutions; 1958–1961 | Irwin Haskett |
