= Charles Winnans Cox =

Canadian politician

Charlie Cox

Ontario MPP
- In office 1948–1951
- Preceded by: Garfield Anderson
- Succeeded by: Clare Mapledoram
- Constituency: Fort William
- In office 1934–1943
- Preceded by: Donald McDonald Hogarth
- Succeeded by: Fred Robinson
- Constituency: Port Arthur

Mayor of Port Arthur, Ontario
- In office 1934-1948, 1952

Personal details
- Born: July 7, 1882 Westminster Township, Middlesex County, Ontario
- Died: March 28, 1958 (aged 75) Thunder Bay, Ontario
- Party: Liberal
- Occupation: Timber contractor
- Portfolio: Minister without Portfolio (1936-1937)

Charles Winnans Cox (July 7, 1882 - March 28, 1958) was a politician and timber contractor in Ontario, Canada. He was a Liberal member of the Legislative Assembly of Ontario representing the riding of Port Arthur from 1934 to 1943 and the riding of Fort William from 1948 to 1951. He was a member of Mitchell Hepburn's cabinet from 1936 to 1937. He also served as mayor of Port Arthur, Ontario from 1934 to 1948 and again in 1952.

== Background ==
He was born on a farm in Westminster Township, Middlesex County, Ontario and worked as a farm and ranch hand near Nanton, Alberta. In about 1908 he moved to Port Arthur, Ontario where he married Johanna Bengston 4 June 1910. He became one of the largest timber contractors in the Thunder Bay region, then branched into general contracting. Forest historian Mark Kuhlberg has investigated aspects of Cox's role in the shady nature of forest exploitation in twentieth-century Ontario, particularly cutting timber on Indian reserve land at Gull Bay First Nation and Long Lac Reserve (see Long Lake 58 First Nation.

== Politics ==
He was elected as a councillor of Port Arthur in 1932, and became mayor in 1934. He served as mayor until 1948, being re-elected for 15 years.

A supporter of the Conservative Party while they were in power, he sought the Liberal nomination for Port Arthur riding for the June 1934 provincial election, and was elected to the Legislative Assembly of Ontario with 58.9% of the votes cast. Liberal Premier Mitchell Hepburn named him to cabinet as a minister without portfolio in December 1936.

Any chances of remaining a cabinet minister vanished in February 1937 when one of his love affairs went sour, and a 32-year-old teacher threw acid at him, scarring his handsome face and impairing the sight in his left eye, which required him to have plastic surgery in Rochester N.Y. . The scandal did not hurt him locally, and he was re-elected in the October 1937 election, but not re-appointed to cabinet. He became highly critical of the Liberal government's timber policy.

He was defeated as a Liberal candidate in the 1943 election, and as an Independent in the 1945 election.

Always an unpredictable and controversial figure, he astonished most observers by running and getting elected in the neighbouring riding of Fort William, Ontario in the 1948 election as a Liberal candidate. That same year, still the retiring mayor of Port Arthur, he brazenly ran for mayor of Fort William, but lost to Hubert Badanai.

He ran in the 1950 Ontario Liberal leadership convention, placing sixth with 24 votes. He was defeated in the 1951 election. His last political victory came in 1952 when he was again elected as mayor of Port Arthur.

The death of his wife in July 1953 marked the end of his political career. He died in March 1958 of a heart seizure, tending furnace in a building he owned. The Port Arthur News-Chronicle quoted this character sketch from a Weekend Magazine article done about 1948,

An astute if unruly mayor he was once described as a man always in or on the brink of a consummate rage. Under a robust growth of steely-gray hair, his corrugated features approximated those of a truculent bulldog. He had the self-assurance of a man used to victory at the polls and was given to taunting his opponents with a tongue like a flame-thrower. "I can be mayor of Port Arthur as long as I wish", he said not long before his voluntary retirement from that position. "Do you think any other mayor is talked about as much as I am."

The editorial also noted, "The truculent lumberman and politician found his constituents divided rigidly into two camps - those who swore by hm and those who swore at him. But even his bitterest enemies admitted that his impulsive and unpredictable acts brought reams of publicity to himself and his beloved city."
