= Donald Hogarth =

Canadian politician (1879–1950)

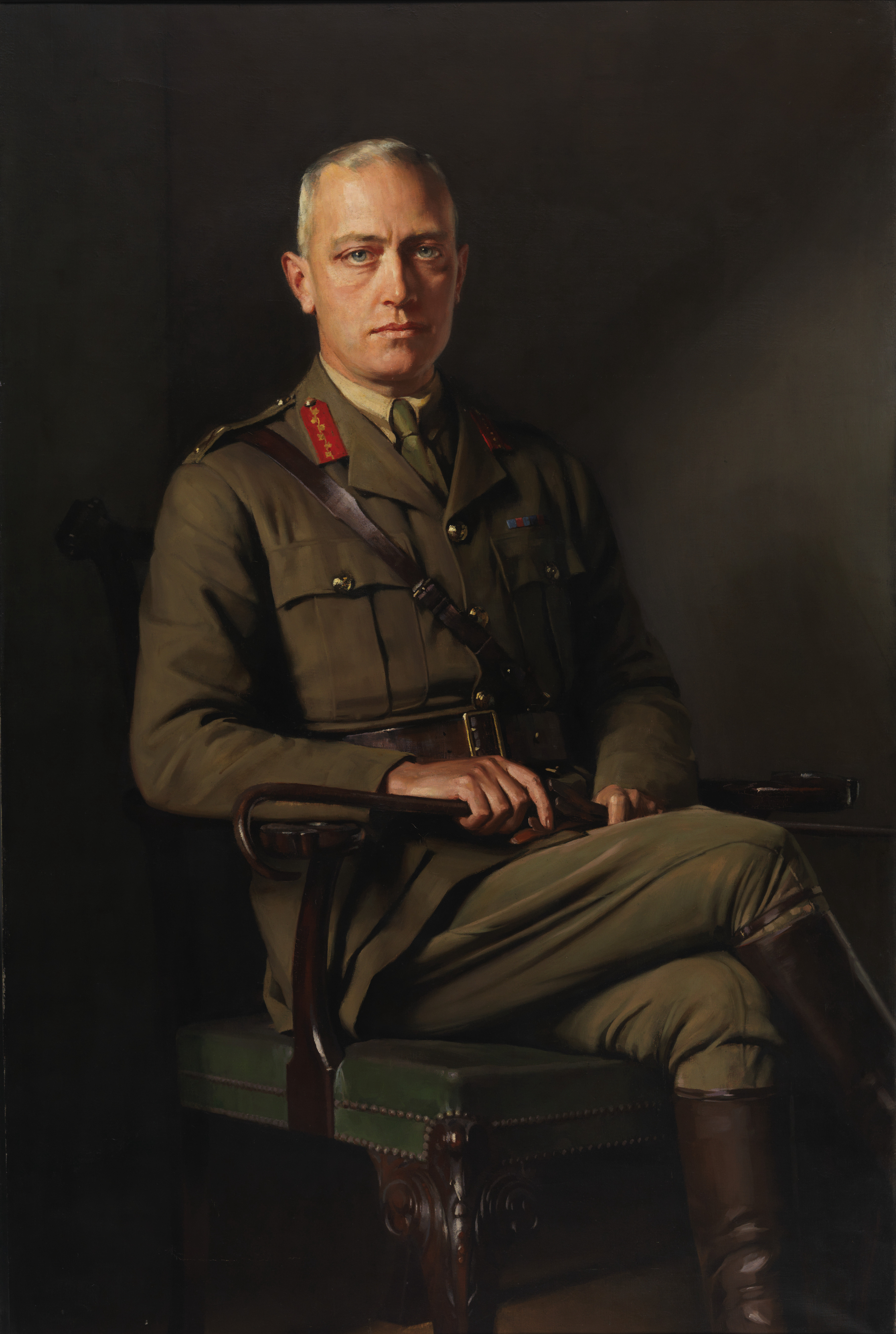

Ontario MPP
- In office 1926–1934
- Preceded by: Francis Henry Keefer
- Succeeded by: Charles Winnans Cox
- In office 1911–1923
- Preceded by: J.J. Carrick
- Succeeded by: Francis Henry Keefer
- Constituency: Port Arthur

Personal details
- Born: June 15, 1879 Osceola, Ontario
- Died: June 27, 1950 (aged 71) Toronto, Ontario
- Party: Conservative
- Occupation: Mining financier
- Awards: DSO

Military service
- Allegiance: Canadian
- Branch/service: Army
- Years of service: 1914-1919
- Rank: Major-General
- Commands: Quartermaster-General
- Battles/wars: World War I

Donald McDonald Hogarth DSO (June 15, 1879 – June 27, 1950) was a politician and mining financier from Ontario, Canada. He was a member of the Legislative Assembly of Ontario representing the riding of Port Arthur from 1911 to 1923 and again from 1926 to 1929. He served with the Canadian Expeditionary Force in World War I where he achieved the rank of Major-General. He was a well-known mining financier who founded some of the biggest gold mines in Northern Ontario.

== Background ==
Hogarth was born in Osceola, Ontario in 1879, the son of William Hogarth, and was educated in Mattawa. As an associate of real estate promoter and politician John James Carrick, he moved to Port Arthur in February 1905.

In 1914 at the start of World War I, he enlisted in the army and rose rapidly through the Canadian military ranks, from lieutenant to captain to major in 1915 in charge of military supplies and transport in London. In January 1917 he was appointed a lieutenant-colonel and made director of supply and transport for the Canadian forces. He was awarded the DSO (Distinguished Service Order) in June 1917, the year he became acting quartermaster-general of the Canadian Expeditionary Force. In February 1918 he was appointed Quartermaster-General with the rank of Brigadier-General, and left the military in 1919 with the rank of Major-General.

As a mining financier and political operator, he was associated with the Little Long Lac gold mine near Geraldton. His greatest venture was the development of the Steep Rock Iron Mines Limited at Steep Rock Lake near Atikokan. He was inducted into the Canadian Mining Hall of Fame. He died in Toronto in 1950.

== Politics ==
He was elected to the Legislative Assembly of Ontario for Port Arthur riding in Northern Ontario as a Conservative in the December 1911 provincial election. He was re-elected in 1914 and 1919, serving until May 1923. Re-entering provincial politics, he was elected as an Independent-Conservative in December 1926 and re-elected as a Conservative in October 1929, ending his political career in May 1934. During his long political career he focused his efforts on the development of the mining and pulp and paper industry.
