= Frederick Oliver Robinson =

Canadian machinist and politician

Fred Robinson

Mayor of Port Arthur, Ontario
- In office 1949-1951, 1953-1955

Ontario MPP
- In office 1943–1951
- Preceded by: C.W. Cox
- Succeeded by: George Wardrope
- Constituency: Port Arthur

Personal details
- Born: August 2, 1903; Port Arthur, Ontario
- Died: June 26, 1969 (aged 65); Thunder Bay, Ontario
- Political party: Co-operative Commonwealth Federation
- Spouse: Jean Thelma McArthur
- Occupation: Civil servant

Frederick Oliver Robinson (August 2, 1903 – June 26, 1969) was an Ontario machinist and political figure. He represented Port Arthur in the Legislative Assembly of Ontario from August 1943 to November 1951 as a Co-operative Commonwealth Federation member.

== Background ==
He was born in Port Arthur, Ontario, the son of William James Robinson, and was educated there. He married Jean Thelma McArthur on December 27, 1934. Robinson also served on the local Board of Education.

== Politics ==
He was elected to the Ontario legislature in 1943 in the riding of Port Arthur. He defeated the Conservative incumbent C.W. Cox. He was re-elected in twice before being defeated by George Wardrope in 1951.

He was mayor of Port Arthur from 1949 to 1951 and from 1953 to August 31, 1955 when he resigned to accept a position as personnel and public relations officer for the Port Arthur Public Utilities Commission.
