= Harry Mills (politician) =

Canadian politician

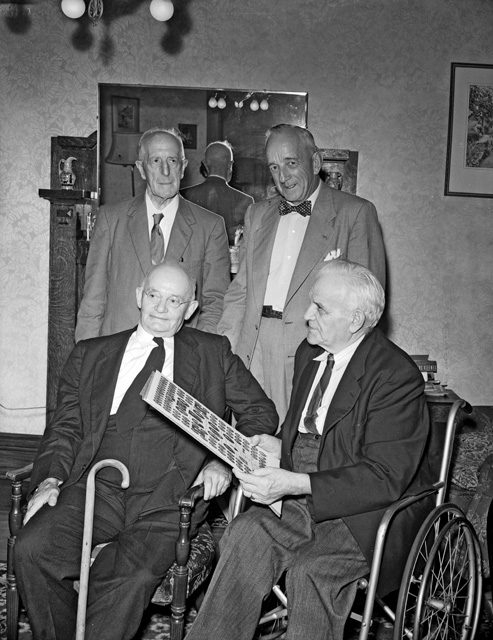
- Mills (1st from left) in 1955, with last surviving members of the 1919-1923 coalition

Ontario MPP
- In office 1919–1923
- Preceded by: Charles William Jarvis
- Succeeded by: Franklin Harford Spence
- Constituency: Fort William

Personal details
- Born: October 11, 1873 Bedwellty, Caerphilly, Wales
- Died: December 20, 1959 (aged 86) Vancouver, British Columbia, Canada
- Resting place: Mountain View Cemetery; Fort William, Ontario
- Party: Labour
- Spouse: Mabel Elsie Mackenzie (m. 1900)
- Occupation: Locomotive engineer

Henry Mills (October 11, 1873 – December 20, 1959), better known as Harry Mills, was a locomotive engineer before being elected to the Legislative Assembly of Ontario as the Labour candidate for the riding of Fort William in the October 1919 election. He was appointed to the cabinet as its first Minister of Mines and served until his defeat in the general election of June 1923.

== Biography ==
Born in Wales in 1873, and later raised in Birmingham, England, he commenced work about 1893 as a wiper in the Canadian Pacific Railway roundhouse at Fort William and rose through the ranks from fireman to locomotive engineer. He was active in the Brotherhood of Locomotive Engineers, and was elected to the Fort William Board of Education (Note: now part of the Lakehead District School Board) serving as its chairman during 1917–1919. Construction of the Fort William Collegiate Institute (Note: which closed in 2005) began in 1919 under his leadership.

Following his election as MLA in 1919, the Independent Labour Party nominated him to become Ontario's first Minister of Mines, a move that caused some controversy. He sat in Cabinet as Minister without Portfolio until the new department was officially created, after which he was named its Minister.

On July 24, 1900, at Port Arthur, Ontario, he married Mabel E. McKenzie, with whom he had five children. She died in November 1925 at Brandon, Manitoba, where Mills had resumed railroading after his defeat in 1923.

Mills died at Vancouver, British Columbia in December 1959.

== Cabinet positions ==
Drury ministry, Province of Ontario (1919–1923)
Cabinet posts (2)
Predecessor	Office	Successor
	Minister without Portfolio; 1919-1920	
Howard Ferguson (Note: Was called Department of Lands, Forests and Mines before 1920)	Minister of Mines; 1920-1923	Charles McCrea
