= Evelyn Pepper =

Canadian nurse

- Born: 3 March 1905; Ottawa, Ontario
- Died: 2 April 1998 (aged 93); Ottawa, Ontario
- Military career
- Allegiance: Canada
- Branch: Canadian Army
- Rank: Major
- Unit: Royal Canadian Army Medical Corps
- Conflicts: Second World War
- Awards: Member of the Order of Canada; Royal Red Cross; Commander of the Order of St John; Florence Nightingale Medal

Evelyn Agnes Pepper, CM, RRC (3 March 1905 – 2 April 1998) was a Canadian nurse and nursing sister. She was awarded the Florence Nightingale Medal and was made Honorary President of the Nursing Sisters Association of Canada.

Pepper was born in Ottawa, Ontario, and graduated from Ottawa Civic Hospital in 1928 before attending McGill University. She served as a Nursing Sister for the Royal Canadian Army Medical Corps in England, Italy, the Netherlands and France during World War II. She was awarded the Royal Red Cross in 1945.

Pepper was appointed a Member of the Order of Canada in 1996 for her "outstanding example of dedication, professionalism and responsibility," as well as her leadership, contributions to health care, and disaster emergency planning. Pepper died in her native Ottawa in 1998, aged 93. She never married.

== Sources ==
- Guly, Christopher. Globe and Mail (Toronto), 4 June 1998, page A20
