= Ontario New Democratic Party candidates in the 2025 Ontario general election =

This is a list of nominated candidates for the Ontario New Democratic Party in the upcoming 2025 Ontario general election. The ONDP ran candidates in 123 of the province's 124 ridings. Following the election, the ONDP remained the second largest party in the Legislative Assembly of Ontario, once again forming the Official Opposition.

== Central Ontario ==
Riding	Candidate's Name	Notes	Residence	Occupation	Votes	%	Rank
Barrie—Innisfil	Andrew Harrigan	President of OPSEU Local 304; Candidate for Ward 3 in the 2022 Innisfil municipal election	Innisfil	Child protection investigator/Union leader (OPSEU)	5,442	13.36	3rd
Barrie—Springwater—Oro-Medonte	Tracey Lapham		Barrie	Author	2,710	6.73	3rd
Dufferin—Caledon	George Nakitsas		Mono	Union official (United Steelworkers)	3,184	6.41	4th
Haliburton—Kawartha Lakes—Brock	Barbara Doyle	ONDP candidate for Haliburton—Kawartha Lakes—Brock in the 2022 provincial election NDP candidate for Haliburton—Kawartha Lakes—Brock in the 2019 federal election	Lindsay	Museum curator	6,980	13.77	3rd
Northumberland—Peterborough South	Bruce LePage		Cobourg	Teacher	5,097	9.32	3rd
Peterborough—Kawartha	Jen Deck	ONDP candidate for Peterborough—Kawartha in the 2022 provincial election	Peterborough	Teacher	9,290	16.86	3rd
Simcoe North	Jordi Malcolm		Orillia	University student	4,813	9.95	3rd
Simcoe–Grey	Benten Tinkler		Toronto	Non-profit fundraiser	3,264	5.72	3rd
York—Simcoe	Justin Graham		Georgina	Property assessor	3,206	7.71	3rd

== Eastern Ontario/Ottawa ==
Riding	Candidate's Name	Notes	Residence	Occupation	Votes	%	Rank
Bay of Quinte	Amanda Robertson	Hastings & Prince Edward District School Board Trustee for Belleville/Thurlow (2022–present); ONDP candidate in the 2024 Bay of Quinte provincial by-election	Belleville	Director at the John Howard Society	8,793	18.83	3rd
Carleton	Sherin Faili		Stittsville	Human resources professional	3,763	7.14	3rd
Glengarry—Prescott—Russell	Ryder Finlay			University student	2,384	5.01	3rd
Hastings—Lennox and Addington	Jessica Zielke		Southern Hastings—Lennox and Addington	Administrator	4,810	11.54	3rd
Kanata—Carleton	Dave Belcher		Kanata, Ottawa	Teacher	3,419	7.18	3rd
Kingston and the Islands	Elliot Goodell Ugalde		Kingston	Researcher/Academic	6,663	12.32	3rd
Lanark—Frontenac—Kingston	John MacRae		Balderson	Civil servant	5,030	10.56	3rd
Leeds—Grenville—Thousand Islands and Rideau Lakes	Chris Wilson	ONDP candidate for Leeds—Grenville—Thousand Islands and Rideau Lakes in the 2022 provincial election	Kemptville	Finance professional	4,489	9.85	3rd
Nepean	Max Blair		Ottawa	Civil servant	4,116	8.81	3rd
Orléans	Matthew Sévigny		Ottawa	University student	3,378	6.00	3rd
Ottawa Centre	Catherine McKenney	Member of Ottawa City Council for Somerset Ward (2014–2022); Candidate for Mayor of Ottawa in the 2022 Ottawa municipal election	Centretown West, Ottawa	Non-profit executive/Policy analyst	32,483	55.70	1st
Ottawa South	Morgan Gay	ONDP candidate for Ottawa South in the 2022 provincial election NDP candidate for Ottawa South in the 2019 federal election	Alta Vista, Ottawa	Union negotiator (PSAC)	7,447	17.76	3rd
Ottawa West—Nepean	Chandra Pasma	Member of Provincial Parliament for Ottawa West—Nepean (2022–present)	Qualicum-Graham Park, Ottawa	Researcher/Policy analyst	20,087	49.33	1st
Ottawa—Vanier	Myriam Djilane	ONDP candidate for the 2020 Ottawa—Vanier provincial by-election	Ottawa	Civil servant	7,350	18.25	3rd
Renfrew—Nipissing—Pembroke	Marshall Buchanan		Douglas	Farmer/Small business owner	6,607	15.25	3rd
Stormont—Dundas—South Glengarry	Jeremy Rose		Cornwall	Union leader (CUPW)/Postal worker	4,726	12.38	3rd

== Greater Toronto Area ==
Riding	Candidate's Name	Notes	Residence	Occupation	Votes	%	Rank
Ajax	Arthur Augustine	Candidate for Mayor of Ajax in the 2022 and 2018 Ajax municipal elections	Ajax	Mediator/Small business owner	2,884	7.01	3rd
Aurora—Oak Ridges—Richmond Hill	Naila Saeed			Child care industry executive	1,929	5.61	3rd
Beaches—East York	Kate Dupuis	ONDP candidate for Beaches—East York in the 2022 provincial election	Toronto	Clinical neuropsychologist/Professor at Sheridan College	9,660	22.94	2nd
Brampton Centre	Sukhamrit Singh		Brampton	Law student/Canadian Armed Forces reservist	2,161	8.81	3rd
Brampton East	Martin Singh	Candidate in the 2018 Brampton municipal election for Wards 7 & 8 Candidate in the 2012 New Democratic Party leadership election	Brampton	Pharmacist	3,104	10.89	3rd
Brampton North	Ruby Zaman		Brampton	Truck driver	2,479	8.10	3rd
Brampton South	Rajni Sharma		Brampton	Social services worker	2,413	8.24	3rd
Brampton West	Sam Sarjeant			Researcher	1,981	5.89	3rd
Burlington	Megan Beauchemin		Burlington	Auto worker	4,487	8.03	3rd
Davenport	Marit Stiles	Leader of the Ontario New Democratic Party (2023–present); Member of Provincial Parliament for Davenport (2018–present); President of the New Democratic Party (2016–2018); Toronto District School Board Trustee for Ward 9 (Davenport) (2014–2018)	Toronto	Research/Policy analyst	22,143	57.07	1st
Don Valley East	Frank Chu	ONDP candidate for York Centre in the 2022 provincial election		Social worker	2,094	7.67	3rd
Don Valley North	Ebrahim Astaraki	ONDP candidate for Don Valley North in the 2022 provincial election		Educator	1,562	5.11	4th
Don Valley West	Linnea Löfström-Abary		Mount Pleasant East, Toronto	Union organizer (CUPE)	1,268	3.95	3rd
Durham	Chris Borgia	ONDP candidate for Durham in the 2022 provincial election NDP candidate in the 2024 Durham federal by-election President of the Durham Region Labour Council		Electrician	7,635	14.29	3rd
Eglinton—Lawrence	~~Natasha Doyle-Merrick~~ None	~~ONDP candidate for Eglinton—Lawrence in the 2022 provincial election~~ Withdrew on February 14, 2025	~~Toronto~~	~~Mental health worker/University student~~	–	–	–
Etobicoke Centre	Giulia Volpe			Union official (OPSEU)	2,151	4.65	3rd
Etobicoke—Lakeshore	Rozhen Asrani		Mimico	Healthcare industry manager	3,640	7.01	3rd
Etobicoke North	Bryan Blair		Etobicoke	HVAC professional	2,067	7.96	3rd
Humber River—Black Creek	Tom Rakocevic	Member of Provincial Parliament for Humber River—Black Creek (2018–present)	Toronto	Executive assistant	8,788	35.33	1st
King—Vaughan	Rick Morelli	ONDP candidate for Vaughan in the 2007 provincial election NDP candidate for Thornhill in the 2004 federal election Metropolitan Separate School Board Trustee for Downsview (1988–?)	Woodbridge	Pharmacy manager	1,714	3.86	3rd
Markham—Stouffville	Gregory Hines	NDP candidate for Markham—Stouffville in the 2015 federal election		Small business owner	2,051	4.56	3rd
Markham—Thornhill	Paul Sahbaz	NDP candidate for Markham—Thornhill in the 2021 and 2019 federal elections	Milliken Mills, Markham		1,176	4.41	3rd
Markham—Unionville	Sameer Qureshi		Markham	University student	1,298	3.95	3rd
Milton	Katherine-Anne Cirlincione	ONDP candidate for Milton in the 2022 provincial election	Milton		2,403	5.67	3rd
Mississauga Centre	Waseem Ahmed	NDP candidate for Mississauga—Malton in the 2015 federal election ONDP candidate in Mississauga East—Cooksville in the 2011 provincial election NDP candidate for Mississauga East—Cooksville in the 2011 federal election	Mississauga	Small business owner	2,310	6.51	3rd
Mississauga East—Cooksville	Alex Venuto			Policy analyst	1,879	5.23	3rd
Mississauga—Erin Mills	Mubashir Rizvi		Mississauga	Lawyer	2,087	5.54	3rd
Mississauga—Lakeshore	Spencer Ki	ONDP candidate for York—Simcoe in the 2022 provincial election		Data analyst	1,974	4.56	3rd
Mississauga—Malton	Gerard McDonald			Economist	2,000	6.74	3rd
Mississauga—Streetsville	Shoaib Khawar				2,012	5.02	3rd
Newmarket—Aurora	Denis Heng	ONDP candidate for Newmarket—Aurora in the 2022 provincial election		Epidemiologist	2,709		3rd
Oakville	Diane Downey			Video game designer	1,851	3.91	3rd
Oakville North—Burlington	Caleb Smolenaars			University student	2,769	5.38	3rd
Oshawa	Jennifer French	Member of Provincial Parliament for Oshawa (2014–present)	Oshawa	Teacher	20,367	45.87	1st
Parkdale—High Park	Alexa Gilmour		Toronto	United Church minister	20,508	45.35	1st
Pickering—Uxbridge	Khalid Ahmed	ONDP candidate for Pickering—Uxbridge in the 2022 provincial election ONDP candidate for Don Valley East in the 2018 provincial election ONDP candidate for Don Valley West in the 2014 and 2011 provincial elections		Social worker	3,381		3rd
Richmond Hill	Raymond Bhushan	ONDP candidate for Richmond Hill in the 2022 provincial election		University student	1,771		3rd
Scarborough—Agincourt	Francesca Policarpio			University student	1,368	5.02	3rd
Scarborough Centre	Sonali Chakraborti			Project manager	2,628	8.66	3rd
Scarborough—Guildwood	Christian Keay			Small business owner	1,811	6.69	3rd
Scarborough North	Hadsha Navaneethan	ONDP candidate in the 2023 Scarborough—Guildwood provincial by-election		Union official (OPSEU)/Educator	2,554	10.38	3rd
Scarborough—Rouge Park	Hibah Sidat			Professor at the University of Toronto	2,360	7.09	3rd
Scarborough Southwest	Doly Begum	Deputy Leader of the Ontario New Democratic Party (2022–2026); Member of Provincial Parliament for Scarborough Southwest (2018–2026)	Scarborough, Toronto	Researcher/policy analyst	14,557	42.89	1st
Thornhill	Faiz Qureshi		York Region	Medical student	1,282	3.59	3rd
Toronto Centre	Kristyn Wong-Tam	Member of Provincial Parliament for Toronto Centre (2022–present); Member of Toronto City Council for Ward 13 Toronto Centre (2018–2022); Member of Toronto City Council for Ward 27 Toronto Centre-Rosedale (2010–2018)	Toronto	Small business owner	17,415	44.50	1st
Toronto—Danforth	Peter Tabuns	Interim Leader of the Ontario New Democratic Party (2022–2023); Member of Provincial Parliament for Toronto—Danforth (2006–present); Member of Toronto City Council (1990–1997)	Toronto	Former executive director of Greenpeace Canada	25,607	60.42	1st
Toronto—St. Paul’s	Jill Andrew	Member of Provincial Parliament for Toronto—St. Paul’s (2018–2025)	Toronto	Educator	13,533	31.74	2nd
University—Rosedale	Jessica Bell	Member of Provincial Parliament for University—Rosedale (2018–present)	Toronto	Lecturer at Toronto Metropolitan University	17,912	45.50	1st
Vaughan—Woodbridge	Elif Genc			Academic	1,479		3rd
Whitby	Jamie Nye		Pickering	Electrician	4,097		3rd
Willowdale	Boris Ivanov				1,705	5.45	3rd
York Centre	Natalie Van Halteren		York	University student	1,700	5.60	3rd
York South—Weston	Faisal Hassan	Member of Provincial Parliament for York South—Weston (2018–2022)	Weston	Broadcaster/Author	8,101	25.56	3rd

== Hamilton-Niagara ==
Riding	Candidate's Name	Notes	Residence	Occupation	Votes	%	Rank
Flamborough—Glanbrook	Lilly Noble		Ancaster	Cancer researcher	6,095	12.65	3rd
Hamilton Centre	Robin Lennox		Hamilton	Physician	12,839	38.36	1st
Hamilton East—Stoney Creek	Zaigham Butt	ONDP candidate for Hamilton East—Stoney Creek in the 2022 provincial election	Hamilton	Accountant	6,862	17.60	3rd
Hamilton Mountain	Kojo Damptey	Candidate for Ward 14–West Mountain in the 2022 Hamilton municipal election	Hamilton	Instructor at McMaster University/Musician	10,037	26.02	3rd
Hamilton West—Ancaster—Dundas	Sandy Shaw	Member of Provincial Parliament for Hamilton West—Ancaster—Dundas (2018–present)	Hamilton	Former Director of the Hamilton Port Authority	19,684	38.87	1st
Niagara Centre	Jeff Burch	Member of Provincial Parliament for Niagara Centre (2018–present); Member of St. Catharines City Council (2006–2014)	Thorold	Union leader (United Steelworkers)/Instructor at Brock University	20,408	42.29	1st
Niagara Falls	Wayne Gates	Member of Provincial Parliament for Niagara Falls (2014–present); Member of Niagara Falls City Council (2010–2014)	Niagara Falls	Union leader (Unifor)	29,549	54.95	1st
Niagara West	Dave Augustyn	Mayor of Pelham (2006–2018)	Fenwick	Policy consultant	7,312	16.32	3rd
St. Catharines	Jennie Stevens	Member of Provincial Parliament for St. Catharines (2018–present); Member of St. Catharines City Council (2003–2018)	St. Catharines	Non-profit executive	19,688	42.12	1st

== Northern Ontario ==
Riding	Candidate's Name	Notes	Residence	Occupation	Votes	%	Rank
Algoma—Manitoulin	David Timeriski		Elliot Lake	Firefighter	7,409	27.19	2nd
Kenora—Rainy River	Rudy Turtle	Chief of the Asubpeeschoseewagong First Nation (?–2024 & ?–2020); NDP candidate for Kenora in the 2019 federal election	Grassy Narrows		3,308	18.81	2nd
Kiiwetinoong	Sol Mamakwa	Deputy Leader of the Ontario New Democratic Party (2022–present); Member of Provincial Parliament for Kiiwetinoong (2018–present)	Sioux Lookout	Healthcare advisor	3,512	62.19	1st
Mushkegowuk—James Bay	Guy Bourgouin	Member of Provincial Parliament for Mushkegowuk—James Bay (2018–present)	Kapuskasing	Union leader (United Steelworkers)	3,610	45.47	1st
Nickel Belt	France Gélinas	Member of Provincial Parliament for Nickel Belt (2007–present)	Naughton	Physiotherapist	17,123	48.37	1st
Nipissing	Loren Mick	Member of Mattawa Town Council (2022–present)	Mattawa	Chef	7,980	25.21	2nd
Parry Sound—Muskoka	Jim Ronholm	Member of Strong Town Council (2022–present)	Strong	Professor at Canadore College	1,329	2.86	4th
Sault Ste. Marie	Lisa Vezeau-Allen	Member of Sault Ste. Marie City Council for Ward 2 (2022–present)	Sault Ste. Marie	Charity director	12,957	42.69	2nd
Sudbury	Jamie West	Member of Provincial Parliament for Sudbury (2018–present)	Sudbury	Metalworker/Union leader (United Steelworkers)	14,760	46.74	1st
Thunder Bay—Atikokan	Judith Monteith-Farrell	Member of Provincial Parliament for Thunder Bay—Atikokan (2018–2022)	Thunder Bay	Union official (PSAC)	7,766	25.86	2nd
Thunder Bay—Superior North	Lise Vaugeois	Member of Provincial Parliament for Thunder Bay—Superior North (2022–present)	Thunder Bay	Professor at Lakehead University/Musician	11,137	40.57	1st
Timiskaming—Cochrane	John Vanthof	Member of Provincial Parliament for Timiskaming—Cochrane (2011–present); Deputy Leader of the Ontario New Democratic Party (2018–2022)	Earlton	Farmer	11,085	43.96	1st
Timmins	Corey Lepage		Timmins	Financial advisor	2,732	19.94	2nd

== Southwestern Ontario ==
Riding	Candidate's Name	Notes	Residence	Occupation	Votes	%	Rank
Brantford—Brant	Harvey Bischof	ONDP candidate for Brantford—Brant in the 2022 provincial election President of the Ontario Secondary School Teachers' Federation (2017–2021)	Brantford	Teacher	12,005		2nd
Bruce—Grey—Owen Sound	James Harris		Owen Sound	Videographer	3,611	7.91	4th
Cambridge	Marjorie Knight	ONDP candidate for Cambridge in the 2022 and 2018 provincial elections	Cambridge	Social worker	5,074		3rd
Chatham-Kent—Leamington	Christian Sachs	Thames Valley District School Board Trustee (2022–present)	Middlesex County		7,333		3rd
Elgin—Middlesex—London	~~Amanda Zavitz~~ None	Withdrew on February 20, 2025		~~Professor at Western University and Fanshawe College/Small business owner~~	4,738		3rd
Essex	Rachael Mills		Harrow	Recruiter	12,047		2nd
Guelph	Cameron Spence		Guelph	Marketing professional	3,497		4th
Haldimand—Norfolk	Erica Englert		Dunnville	University student	2,147		4th
Huron—Bruce	Nick McGregor		Goderich	Teacher	5,739		3rd
Kitchener Centre	Brooklin Wallis	Candidate for Kitchener City Council in the 2022 Kitchener municipal election	Kitchener	Sales professional	2,821		4th
Kitchener—Conestoga	Jodi Szimanski		Wellesley	Communications professional	7,551		3rd
Kitchener South—Hespeler	Jeff Donkersgoed		Hespeler	Teacher	6,841		3rd
Lambton—Kent—Middlesex	Kathryn Shailer	ONDP candidate in the 2024 Lambton—Kent—Middlesex provincial by-election	Alvinston	Educator	5,775		3rd
London—Fanshawe	Teresa Armstrong	Member of Provincial Parliament for London—Fanshawe (2011–present)	London	Insurance professional	18,749		1st
London North Centre	Terence Kernaghan	Member of Provincial Parliament for London North Centre (2018–present)	London	Teacher	22,587		1st
London West	Peggy Sattler	Member of Provincial Parliament for London West (2013–present)	London	Policy analyst	26,589		1st
Oxford	Khadijah Haliru	Member of Ingersoll Town Council (2022–present)	Ingersoll	Business consultant	5,374		3rd
Perth—Wellington	Jason Davis	Candidate for Stratford City Council in the 2022 Stratford municipal election	Stratford	Mechanic	5,666		3rd
Sarnia—Lambton	Candace Young		Sarnia	Professor at Lambton College/Union leader (OPSEU)	8,716		2nd
Waterloo	Catherine Fife	Member of Provincial Parliament for Waterloo (2012–present)	Waterloo	Researcher	25,055		1st
Wellington—Halton Hills	Simone Kent		Fergus	Farmer	3,980		4th
Windsor—Tecumseh	Gemma Grey-Hall	ONDP candidate for Windsor—Tecumseh in the 2022 provincial election Candidate for Ward 8 in the 2022 Windsor municipal election	Windsor	Educator	13,721		2nd
Windsor West	Lisa Gretzky	Member of Provincial Parliament for Windsor West (2014–present)	Windsor	Event planner	19,392		1st

== See also ==
- New Democratic Party candidates in the 2025 Canadian federal election
