= CIWA =

CIWA may refer to:

- California Immigrant Workers Association
- Canadian Injured Workers Alliance
- Catholic Institute of West Africa
- Christmas Island Women's Association
- Clinical Institute Withdrawal Assessment for Alcohol
