= Michael Gravelle =

Canadian politician (born 1949)

The Honourable Michael Gravelle ECO
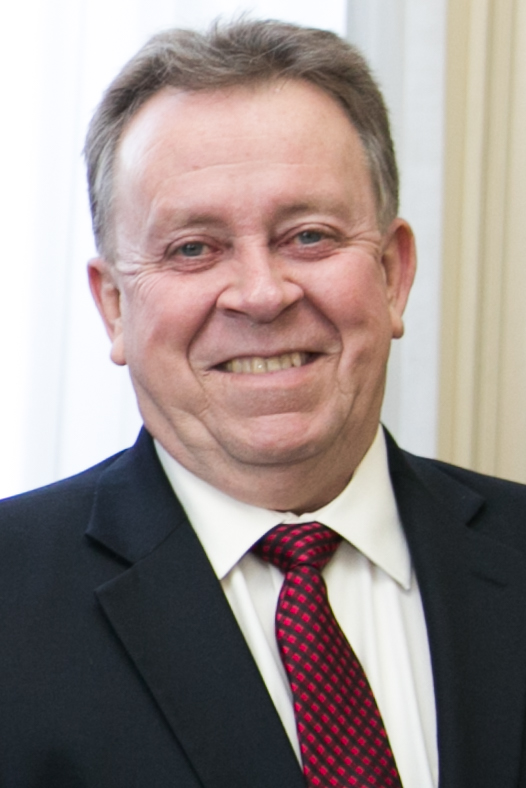
- Gravelle in 2015

Member of the Ontario Provincial Parliament for Thunder Bay—Superior North Port Arthur (1995–1999)
- In office June 8, 1995 – May 3, 2022
- Preceded by: Shelley Wark-Martyn
- Succeeded by: Lise Vaugeois

Personal details
- Born: January 23, 1949 (age 77) Port Arthur, Ontario, Canada
- Party: Ontario Liberal
- Occupation: Executive assistant, publicist

Michael Gravelle ECO (born January 23, 1949) is a politician in Ontario, Canada. He was a Liberal member of the Legislative Assembly of Ontario who represented the riding of Thunder Bay—Superior North from 1995 to 2022 (known as Port Arthur from 1995 to 1999). He served as a member of cabinet during the Dalton McGuinty and Kathleen Wynne governments.

== Background ==
Gravelle was born in Port Arthur, which is now a part of Thunder Bay, the son of WWII soldier Eddie Gravelle and his British war bride Joan Shepherd. He was educated at the Port Arthur Collegiate Institute and Lakehead University, receiving a degree from the latter institution 1968. He was an assistant to Liberal politicians Robert Andras, Stuart Smith and Joe Comuzzi. He also worked as a publicist for the Canadian Broadcasting Corporation, and was a founder of the North of Superior Film Association.

== Politics ==
Gravelle was elected to the Ontario legislature in the 1995 provincial election, defeating incumbent New Democrat Shelley Wark-Martyn by almost 7,000 votes in the riding of Port Arthur. The election was won by the Progressive Conservative Party of Ontario, and Gravelle joined 29 other Liberals in the opposition benches. He supported Dwight Duncan for the party leadership in 1996.

Gravelle was easily re-elected for the new riding of Thunder Bay—Superior North in the 1999 provincial election.

In the provincial election of 2003, Gravelle was re-elected with 72.5 per cent of the popular vote, the highest percentage total in the province. He was appointed caucus chair on November 25, 2003. In the 2007 election, he was returned by a much narrower margin, 46.8 to 38.3, against New Democrat candidate Jim Foulds.

On October 30, 2007, Gravelle was named Ontario Minister of Northern Development and Mines. In the summer of 2009, Gravelle's ministry was expanded, adding on the responsibility of forestry. In 2011 he was shuffled to the position of Minister of Natural Resources. In February 2013, Kathleen Wynne moved him back to the position of Minister of Northern Development and Mines. He was reconfirmed in that role after the 2014 election.

He was re-elected in 2011, and 2014.

In February 2017, Gravelle temporarily stepped aside as minister because of his battle with depression; his duties were taken up by fellow cabinet minister Bill Mauro.

The Liberals were heavily defeated at the 2018 provincial election, and Gravelle was left as the only Liberal MPP in Northern Ontario.

In 2020, Gravelle announced that he would be seeking re-election, however, in April 2022 he announced that his previous cancer had returned, and later that month said that he was not able to run for re-election.

=== Cabinet positions ===
Wynne ministry, Province of Ontario (2013–2018)
Cabinet post (1)
Predecessor	Office	Successor
Rick Bartolucci	Minister of Northern Development and Mines; 2013–2018	Greg Rickford
McGuinty ministry, Province of Ontario (2003–2013)
Cabinet posts (2)
Predecessor	Office	Successor
Linda Jeffrey	Minister of Natural Resources; 2011–2013	David Orazietti
Rick Bartolucci	Minister of Northern Development and Mines; 2007–2011	Rick Bartolucci

=== Electoral record ===
2018 Ontario general election: Thunder Bay—Superior North
Party	Candidate	Votes	%	±%
Liberal	Michael Gravelle	11,973	39.86	-16.14
New Democratic	Lise Vaugeois	11,160	37.16	+7.74
Progressive Conservative	Derek Parks	5,395	17.96	+10.79
Green	Amanda Moddejonge	838	2.79	-0.8
Northern Ontario	Andy Wolff	376	1.25	+0.76
Libertarian	Tony Gallo	148	0.49	-2.84
Trillium	Louise Ewen	145	0.48	
Total valid votes		30,035	100.0	
Turnout			55.0	
Eligible voters		54,627		
Liberal hold		Swing		-11.93
Source: Elections Ontario

2014 Ontario general election: Thunder Bay—Superior North
Party	Candidate	Votes	%	±%
Liberal	Michael Gravelle	15,503	56.00	+11.00
New Democratic	Andrew Foulds	8,144	29.42	-5.43
Progressive Conservative	Derek Parks	1,985	7.17	-10.34
Green	Joseph LeBlanc	993	3.59	+1.47
Libertarian	Tamara Johnson	922	3.33	+2.82
Northern Ontario Heritage	Paul Sloan	136	0.49	
Total valid votes		27,683	100.00	
Total rejected, unmarked and declined ballots		262	0.94	
Turnout		27,945	50.41	
Eligible voters		55,436		
Source: Elections Ontario

2011 Ontario general election: Thunder Bay—Superior North
Party	Candidate	Votes	%	±%
Liberal	Michael Gravelle	11,765	45.00	-1.78
New Democratic	Steve Mantis	9,111	34.85	-3.41
Progressive Conservative	Anthony LeBlanc	4,578	17.51	+8.11
Green	Scot Kyle	555	2.12	-3.43
Libertarian	Tony Gallo	133	0.51	
Total valid votes		26,142	100.0	
Total rejected, unmarked and declined ballots		97	0.37	
Turnout		26,239	48.20	
Eligible voters		54,443		
Source: Elections Ontario

2007 Ontario general election: Thunder Bay—Superior North
Party	Candidate	Votes	%	±%
Liberal	Michael Gravelle	13,373	46.78	-25.28
New Democratic	Jim Foulds	10,938	38.26	+23.32
Progressive Conservative	Scott Hobbs	2,688	9.40	-0.16
Green	Dawn Kannegiesser	1,586	5.55	+2.11
Total valid votes		28,585	100.0	
Total rejected, unmarked and declined ballots		169	0.59	
Turnout		28,754	53.91	
Eligible voters		53,341		
Source: Elections Ontario

2003 Ontario general election: Thunder Bay—Superior North
Party	Candidate	Votes	%	±%
Liberal	Michael Gravelle	21,938	72.45	+11.55
New Democratic	Bonnie Satten	4,548	15.02	-3.53
Progressive Conservative	Brent Sylvester	2,912	9.62	-8.36
Green	Carl Rose	882	2.91	+1.70
Total valid votes		30,280	100.00	
Total rejected, unmarked and declined ballots		160	0.53	
Turnout		30,440	55.60	
Eligible voters		54,753		
Source: Elections Ontario

1999 Ontario general election: Thunder Bay—Superior North
Party	Candidate	Votes	%	±%
Liberal	Michael Gravelle	19,249	60.9	+11.98
New Democratic	Nathalie Galesloot	5,864	18.55	-7.11
Progressive Conservative	Ed Linkewich	5,683	17.98	-4.47
Independent	Robert Woito	431	1.36	
Green	Carl Rose	382	1.21	
Total valid votes		31,609	100.00	
Total rejected, unmarked and declined ballots		232	0.73	
Turnout		31,841	54.94	
Eligible voters		57,961		
Source: Elections Ontario

1995 Ontario general election: Port Arthur
Party	Candidate	Votes	%	±%
Liberal	Michael Gravelle	14,281	48.92	+9.76
New Democratic	(x)Shelley Wark-Martyn	7,490	25.66	-17.22
Progressive Conservative	Jim Doherty	6,554	22.45	+8.59
Family Coalition	Anita Harris	683	2.34	-1.76
Independent	Paul Weber	18	0.62	
Total valid votes		29,190	100.00	
Total rejected, unmarked and declined ballots		322	1.09	
Turnout		29,512	61.91	
Eligible voters		47,672		
