= Diane Holmes =

Canadian politician

Ottawa City Councillor
- In office 1983–1994
- Preceded by: Joe Cassey
- Succeeded by: Elisabeth Arnold
- Constituency: Wellington Ward

Ottawa-Carleton Regional Councillor
- In office 1983–2000
- Preceded by: Joe Cassey
- Succeeded by: Position abolished
- Constituency: Wellington Ward (1983-1994); Somerset Ward (1995-2000)

Ottawa City Councillor
- In office 2003–2014
- Preceded by: Elisabeth Arnold
- Succeeded by: Catherine McKenney
- Constituency: Somerset Ward

Personal details
- Party: Independent

Diane Holmes (born c. 1939) is a former Ottawa City Councillor representing Somerset Ward which consists of Centretown, Centretown West and the downtown core. She was born and raised in Montreal, Quebec, and graduated from McGill University with a degree in Physical Education. She taught at McGill and the University of Toronto before moving to Ottawa.

Prior to being entering politics, she was the chairman of the Centretown Citizen's Community Association and the president of Heritage Ottawa.

She was first elected to Ottawa city council in 1982 in a surprise victory over veteran alderman Joe Cassey. On city council, her priorities include housing, urban planning, community development, transportation, social services, women's issues and social justice causes. As a previous head of Heritage Ottawa she worked to preserve heritage structures. She was easily re-elected in 1985 and 1988. She considered a bid for the mayoralty in 1991, but ended up supporting fellow progressive Nancy Smith who came in a strong second (36%) to Jacquelin Holzman (40%). Holmes was easily re-elected to council in 1991.

In 1994 Holmes moved to the council of the Regional Municipality of Ottawa-Carleton, facing little opposition in her bid. She was acclaimed in 1997 and retired from council in 2000 when the regional municipality was abolished and replaced with the new amalgamated City of Ottawa. In 2003 she returned to city council, winning another convincing victory in her previous ward. Holmes was similarly re-elected in 2006.

Holmes supported a bylaw to require property owners to promptly remove graffiti.

Holmes was re-elected in the 2010 municipal election, but didn't seek re-election in 2014.
