= Kevin Holland (Canadian politician) =

Canadian politician

The Honourable Kevin Holland ECO MPP
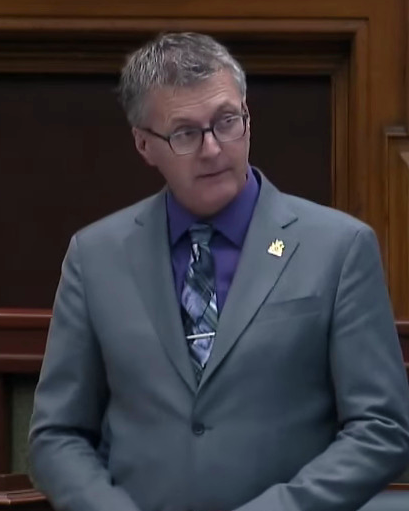
- Holland in 2023

Associate Minister of Forestry and Forestry Products
- Incumbent
- Assumed office August 16, 2024
- Premier: Doug Ford
- Preceded by: Nolan Quinn

Member of the Ontario Provincial Parliament for Thunder Bay—Atikokan
- Incumbent
- Assumed office June 2, 2022
- Preceded by: Judith Monteith-Farrell

Personal details
- Born: Thunder Bay, Ontario
- Party: Progressive Conservative
- Spouse: Lori

Kevin Holland MPP is a Canadian politician, who was first elected to the Legislative Assembly of Ontario in the 2022 provincial election. He was re-elected in the 2025 provincial election. He represents the riding of Thunder Bay—Atikokan as a member of the Progressive Conservative Party of Ontario. He was named to the Ontario cabinet as associate minister of forestry and forestry products on August 16, 2024. Holland was previously the mayor of Conmee Township.

== Career ==
Holland was elected in June 2022 as a Member of Provincial Parliament for his home riding of Thunder Bay-Atikokan. Prior to his role as MPP, Holland served as the Mayor of the Township of Conmee for over 3 decades, being first elected to Council in 1991.

Holland volunteered for 21 years as a community firefighter. He was Operations Manager of Holland Enterprises, a family-owned business that specialized in the manufacturing of custom emergency vehicles and commercial truck bodies.

Following his election as MPP, Holland served as the Parliamentary Assistant to the Minister of Municipal Affairs and Housing and Parliamentary Assistant to the Minister of Northern Development and Minister of Indigenous Affairs. before being appointed as the Parliamentary Assistant to the Minister of Mines. While serving as the Parliamentary Assistant to the Minister of Mines he took on the additional role of Parliamentary Assistant to the Minister of Long Term Care before being appointed as the Associate Minister of Forestry and Forest Products.

== Other work ==
At the time of his election as MPP, Holland was serving as:

- The First Vice-Chair of the Rural Ontario Municipal Association (ROMA),
- Board member of the Northwestern Ontario Municipal Association (NOMA)
- Vice-chair of the Lakehead Rural Municipal Coalition
- Director for the Ontario Association of Police Services Boards - Representing Zone 1
- Chair of the Ontario Provincial Police - Lakehead Police Services Board
- Board member of the Ontario Police Arbitration Commission
- Vice-Chair of the Thunder Bay District Social Services Administration Board.
- Chair of the Conmee Non-Profit Housing Corporation

== Personal life ==
Holland is married to Lori. They have two children, and five grandchildren.

== Electoral history ==
2025 Ontario general election: Thunder Bay—Atikokan
Party	Candidate	Votes	%	±%	Expenditures
Progressive Conservative	Kevin Holland	13,727	45.71	+9.40	$72,862
New Democratic	Judith Monteith-Farrell	7,766	25.86	–7.07	$58,788
Liberal	Stephen Margarit	7,398	24.63	+0.24	$36,388
New Blue	Martin Tempelman	497	1.66	–0.33	$4,159
Green	Eric Arner	457	1.52	–1.42	$0
Northern Ontario	K.C. Jones	184	0.61	+0.09	$0
Total valid votes/expense limit		30,029	99.30	–0.09	$110,514
Total rejected, unmarked, and declined ballots		213	0.70	+0.09	
Turnout		30,242	49.81	+6.72	
Eligible voters		60,715			
Progressive Conservative hold		Swing		+8.24	
Source: Elections Ontario

2022 Ontario general election: Thunder Bay—Atikokan
Party	Candidate	Votes	%	±%	Expenditures
Progressive Conservative	Kevin Holland	9,657	36.31	+13.08	$57,863
New Democratic	Judith Monteith-Farrell	8,759	32.93	−3.33	$84,682
Liberal	Rob Barrett	6,486	24.39	−11.62	$43,988
Green	Eric Arner	781	2.94	+0.23	$509
New Blue	David Tommasini	529	1.99		$2,767
Ontario Party	Dan Criger	248	0.93		$0
Northern Ontario Heritage	Kenneth Jones	138	0.52	−0.92	$0
Total valid votes/expense limit		26,598	99.39	+0.36	$97,107
Total rejected, unmarked, and declined ballots		163	0.61	-0.36	
Turnout		26,761	43.09	-11.65	
Eligible voters		61,879			
Progressive Conservative gain from New Democratic		Swing		+8.20	
Source(s): "Summary of Valid Votes Cast for Each Candidate" (PDF). Elections Ontario. 2022. Archived from the original on 2023-05-18.; "Statistical Summary by Electoral District" (PDF). Elections Ontario. 2022. Archived from the original on 2023-05-21.
