= Southern California drywall strike =

1992 labor strike in the United States

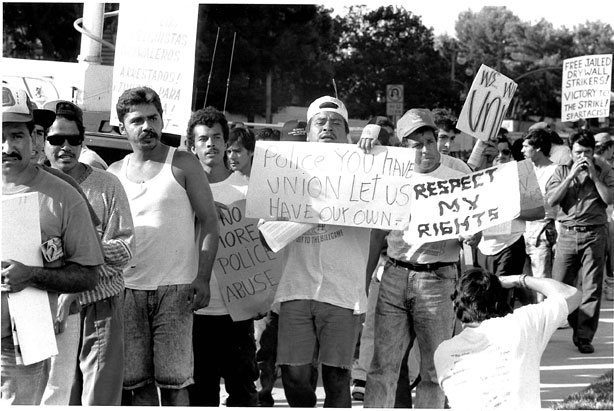
Photograph of workers protesting the jailing of fellow drywall strikers in 1992.

The 1992 Southern California drywall strike was a strike by Mexican and Mexican American drywall hangers, many of whom were undocumented, for fair wages and health insurance from contractors, who stole two billion dollars a years in income taxes, social security, and worker's compensation payments from the workers and collaborated with the local police to repress the organizers. Jesus Gomez, leader of the strike, received threats and had shots fired at his home, while key organizers were tailed by the police and even followed with helicopters. Eventually aligning with the United Brotherhood of Carpenters and Joiners, the strikers succeeded in getting union contracts that ensured fair wages and benefits. The strike left the residential construction industry in a different state. While the industry remained an open shop, contractors were forced to pay Mexican workers with wages and benefits closer to that of the white workers.

== Background ==
In the early 1980s, workers in the drywall industry in Southern California became predominantly Mexican as California contractors exploited nonunion immigrant labor during the state's construction boom, which drove down the costs of building. Wages for drywall workers fell from 9 cents per square foot in the 1970s to 4 and a half cents per square foot in the 1990s. As described by George Lipsitz, "one in four Southern California drywall workers was a Mexican when the job was unionized and high paying, but when contractors broke the union and lowered wages, Mexicans accounted for nine of ten drywall workers." With this change in demographics, employers dropped pensions, insurance, and cut wages of workers in an effort to minimize overall costs. Lipsitz identifies that "because many of the workers were undocumented migrants, cash pay predominated the industry, allowing employers to pocket collectively as much as two billion dollars a year in income taxes, social security, and worker's compensation payments." In addition, knowing that workers who could be deported are in no position to complain about violations of minimum-wage and hour laws or environmental regulations, employers regularly mistreated drywall workers, sometimes even refusing to pay them for work they had already performed."

By 1992, drywall hangers were receiving an average of $300 a week, a wage that could not sustain their families. Most of the workers came from the same region in Mexico, brought into the country by a third party who then took a cut of their paychecks. During this period, the drywall hangers were practicing circular migration where they would be brought back into the United States when there was work and then return to their families in Mexico. While the workers were clearly disadvantaged, their close-knit community and ability to relate to each other aided in their ability to organize into the movement that restored their rights as workers. The drywall hangers followed the example of the recent Justice for Janitors movement in Los Angeles, another Hispanic group demanding fair working conditions, as precedent.

== Strike ==
The strike began with a worker named Jesus Gomez, he had realized his paycheck came out to be sixty dollars less than what it was supposed to be and refused to remain silent. He confronted the contractor he worked for but his employer refused to pay him the missing wages. This angered Gomez and it compelled him to travel to several different worksites in order to attempt to unite the workers in an effort to lobby for their rights. After some time he gathered several hundred workers. The group came up with an ultimatum demanding that they be paid a fair price for their work; If an agreement was not signed by June 1, 1992, they were going to strike. Yet the employers were not intimidated, they did not believe the workers could sustain a strike for a long period of time and expected they would return begging for their jobs.

Only a fraction of the 4,000 drywall hangers in Southern California participated in the strike beginning on June 1, 1992. Beginning with picket lines and the vandalization of half-constructed homes the movement gained followers. At the time, the Drywall Strike was the largest organizing force taking place in the United States. The following day, June 2, 1992, strikers picketing in Orange County were met by the authorities, the police arrested 160 people, sending 60 of them to the Immigration and Naturalization Service (INS) to face deportation back to Mexico. At this time the California Immigrant Workers Association (CIWA) offered their support, they organized media coverages, coordinated the striking effort, and provided legal defense for the cause. Protests continue to grow and subcontractors were forced to take the strike seriously. Much needed monetary and moral contributions was given by Hermandad Mexicana Nacional, Los Amigos de Orange County, League of United Latin American Citizens, along with others.

The contractors responded by working with the local police to ensure they cracked down on the strikes. They conducted massive raids and several of the strikers were booked for vandalism, assault, grand theft, trespassing, and resisting arrest. By the end of the strike 600 workers were turned over to the INS. The drywallers turned to California Immigrant Workers Association for help. The illegal immigrants were not given the right to have a lawyer so the CIWA provided these workers with defense. As the movement grew it spread into San Diego, Riverside, San Bernardino, Ventura and all throughout the Los Angeles area.

The strikers chose to be represented by the United Brotherhood of Carpenters and Joiners and by November 10, 1992, over 30 contractors, or sixty percent of the industry, agreed to negotiate contracts. By December of the same year, five months after the struggle began, 52 contractors signed their contract which entitled them to seven and a half cents per square feet of drywall installed. The two-year contract also stipulated for the workers to receive health insurance which would be funded evenly between workers and employers. In exchange for the first drywall contract in a decade, workers dropped the labor lawsuits they had filed against employers who had withheld overtime pay.

== Aftermath ==
The strike did serve its purpose. Wages for the predominantly Mexican drywall hangers went from $300 a week to between $400 and $500 a week. These wages were an improvement but were still affected by the residential construction slump happening as a result of the economic climate of the period. As a lasting movement, however, it was not as successful. Immediately after the agreement was reached, employers sued the carpenters Union, they won injunctions on picketing which substantially reduced the impact of the strike. The strike did increase the number of contractors who signed contracts with the union, but the majority did remain non-union. Also, the movement failed to reach the same level of success as it moved south to San Diego and it did not succeed in extending to other industries in the residential construction market. Meanwhile, some historians maintain that the drywall strike led as an example to other industries in need of union support in the Los Angeles area.

Five years after the end of the strike, only half of the trade was under a union contract in comparison to the seventy-five percent at the end of the strike. Some attribute this fall to the lack of policing done by the union to protect their gains, allowing contractors to resort to their old ways after contracts expired. After the strike employers made it clear that while they were signing contracts the industry remained an open shop where non-union workers could still participate.
