= Thunder Bay—Superior North (provincial electoral district) =

Provincial electoral district in Ontario, Canada

Coordinates: 49.84°N 88.86°W

Ontario electoral district
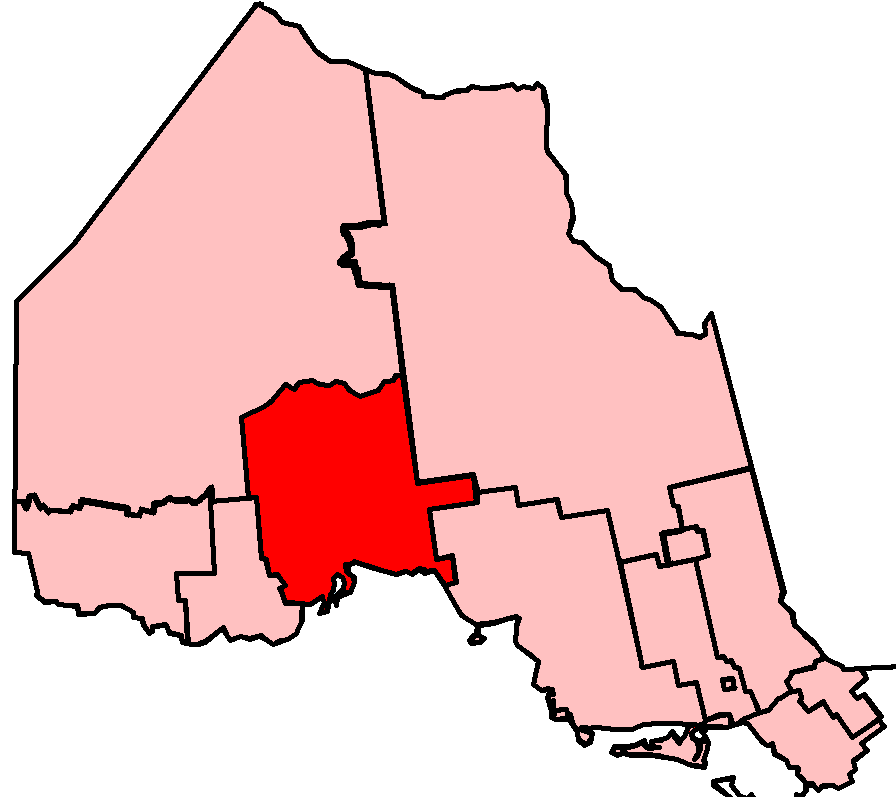
- Thunder Bay—Superior North in relation to the other northern Ontario electoral districts

Provincial electoral district
- Legislature: Legislative Assembly of Ontario
MPP
Lise Vaugeois
New Democratic
- District created: 1999
- First contested: 1999
- Last contested: 2025

Demographics
- Population (2016): 70,475
- Electors (2018): 56,277
- Area (km²): 92,928
- Pop. density (per km²): 0.76
- Census division: Thunder Bay District
- Census subdivision: Thunder Bay

Thunder Bay—Superior North is a provincial electoral district in Ontario, Canada, that has been represented in the Legislative Assembly of Ontario since 1999.

The district is in the northwestern part of the province of Ontario. It consists of the eastern part of the Territorial District of Thunder Bay including the northern part of the city of Thunder Bay.

The current Member of Provincial Parliament for this riding is Lise Vaugeois from the Ontario New Democratic Party.

== Geography ==
Thunder Bay—Superior North consists of the part of the Territorial District of Thunder Bay

- lying east of a line drawn from the northern limit the territorial district due south to the northeast corner of the Township of Bulmer, and south along the eastern boundaries of the townships of Bulmer, Fletcher, Furlonge, McLaurin and Bertrand, east along the 6th Base Line, south along longitude 90o00( W, Dog River and the western shoreline of Dog Lake, west, along the north, west and south boundaries of the Township of Fowler, south along the Kaministiquia River, east along the northern limit of the Township of Oliver Paipoonge, south along its eastern limit and along Pole Line Road, north along Thunder Bay Expressway (Highways 11 and 17), east along Harbour Expressway and Main Street to 110th Avenue, then due east to the eastern limit of the City of Thunder Bay, along that limit to the northeast corner of the Township of Neebing, then southeast to the US border; and
- excluding the part lying south and east of a line drawn from the southwest corner of the Township of Downer due west to a line drawn due south from the southeast corner of the Township of Bain, due south to a line drawn due west from the southwest corner of the Township of McGill, due east to longitude 86o00( W, south along that longitude, and west along the White River to Lake Superior.

== History ==
The district was created from Port Arthur and Lake Nipigon in 1999 when Ontario was divided into the same electoral districts as those used for federal electoral purposes. They were redistributed whenever a readjustment took place at the federal level.

In 2005, legislation was passed by the Legislature to divide Ontario into 107 electoral districts, beginning with the next provincial election in 2007. The eleven northern electoral districts are those defined for federal purposes in 1996, based on the 1991 census (except for a minor boundary adjustment). The 96 southern electoral districts are those defined for federal electoral purposes in 2003, based on the 2001 census. Without this legislation, the number of electoral districts in northern Ontario would have been reduced from eleven to ten.

== Members ==
Thunder Bay—Superior North
Assembly	Years	Member	Party
Riding created from Port Arthur and Lake Nipigon
37th	1999–2003	Michael Gravelle	Liberal
38th	2003–2007	Michael Gravelle	Liberal
39th	2007–2011	Michael Gravelle	Liberal
40th	2011–2014	Michael Gravelle	Liberal
41st	2014–2018	Michael Gravelle	Liberal
42nd	2018–2022	Michael Gravelle	Liberal
43rd	2022–2025	Lise Vaugeois	New Democratic
44th	2025–present	Lise Vaugeois	New Democratic

== Election results ==
Winning party in each polling division of Thunder Bay—Superior North at the 2025 Ontario general election

2025 Ontario general election
Party	Candidate	Votes	%	±%	Expenditures
New Democratic	Lise Vaugeois	11,137	40.57	+6.46	$75,763
Progressive Conservative	Rick Dumas	9,348	34.05	+3.19	$50,764
Liberal	Brian Hamilton	5,846	21.30	–6.98	$64,273
Green	John Northey	437	1.59	–1.40	$0
Northern Ontario Heritage	Daniel K. Campbell	336	1.22	+0.64	$0
New Blue	Katherine Suutari	265	0.97	–0.31	$78
Independent	Steve Hanssen	82	0.30	–	$0
Total valid votes/expense limit		27,451	99.34	–	$145,377
Total rejected, unmarked and declined ballots		183	0.66	–0.00	
Turnout		27,634	48.91	+5.67	
Eligible voters		56,498			
New Democratic hold		Swing		+1.63	
Source: Elections Ontario

Winning party in each polling division of Thunder Bay—Superior North at the 2022 Ontario general election

2022 Ontario general election
Party	Candidate	Votes	%	±%	Expenditures
New Democratic	Lise Vaugeois	8,404	34.12	–3.04	$82,144
Progressive Conservative	Peng You	7,604	30.87	+12.91	$51,833
Liberal	Shelby Ch'ng	6,966	28.28	–11.59	$31,738
Green	Tracey Allison MacKinnon	738	3.00	+0.21	$381
Ontario Party	Stephen Hufnagel	338	1.37	–	$215
New Blue	Katherine Suutari	314	1.27	–	$2,301
Northern Ontario Heritage	Andy Wolff	145	0.59	–0.66	$0
Consensus Ontario	Adam Cherry	125	0.51	–	$0
Total valid votes/expense limit		24,634	99.33	–	$90,488
Total rejected, unmarked and declined ballots		165	0.67	–0.21	
Turnout		24,799	43.24	–10.60	
Eligible voters		57,352			
New Democratic gain from Liberal		Swing		+4.28	
Source: Elections Ontario

2018 Ontario general election
Party	Candidate	Votes	%	±%	Expenditures
Liberal	Michael Gravelle	11,973	39.86	–16.11	$48,443
New Democratic	Lise Vaugeois	11,160	37.16	+7.69	$37,908
Progressive Conservative	Derek Parks	5,395	17.96	+10.78	$42,415
Green	Amanda Moddejonge	838	2.79	–0.81	$81
Northern Ontario Heritage	Andy Wolff	376	1.25	+0.79	$0
Libertarian	Tony Gallo	148	0.49	–2.83	–
Trillium	Louise Ewen	145	0.48	–	–
Total valid votes		30,035	99.13		
Total rejected, unmarked and declined ballots		264	0.87	+0.08	
Turnout		30,299	53.84	+3.43	
Eligible voters		56,277			
Liberal hold		Swing		–11.90	
Source: Elections Ontario

2014 Ontario general election
Party	Candidate	Votes	%	±%
Liberal	Michael Gravelle	15,519	55.97	+10.97
New Democratic	Andrew Foulds	8,169	29.46	–5.39
Progressive Conservative	Derek Parks	1,991	7.18	–10.33
Green	Joseph Leblanc	997	3.60	+1.47
Libertarian	Tamara Johnson	922	3.33	–
Northern Ontario Heritage	Paul Sloan	127	0.46	–
Total valid votes		27,725	99.21	
Total rejected, unmarked and declined ballots		220	0.79	+0.42
Turnout		27,945	50.41	+2.21
Eligible voters		55,436		
Liberal hold		Swing		+8.18
Source: Elections Ontario

2011 Ontario general election
Party	Candidate	Votes	%	±%
Liberal	Michael Gravelle	11,765	45.00	–1.78
New Democratic	Steve Mantis	9,111	34.85	–3.41
Progressive Conservative	Anthony LeBlanc	4,578	17.51	+8.11
Green	Scot Kyle	555	2.12	–3.43
Independent	Tony Gallo	133	0.51	–
Total valid votes		26,142	99.63	
Total rejected, unmarked and declined ballots		97	0.37	–0.22
Turnout		26,239	48.20	–5.71
Eligible voters		54,443		
Liberal hold		Swing		+0.82
Source: Elections Ontario

2007 Ontario general election
Party	Candidate	Votes	%	±%
Liberal	Michael Gravelle	13,373	46.78	–25.67
New Democratic	Jim Foulds	10,938	38.26	+23.25
Progressive Conservative	Scott Hobbs	2,688	9.40	–0.21
Green	Dawn Kannegiesser	1,586	5.55	+2.64
Total valid votes		28,585	99.41	
Total rejected, unmarked and declined ballots		169	0.59	+0.06
Turnout		28,754	53.91	–1.70
Eligible voters		53,341		
Liberal hold		Swing		–24.46
Source: Elections Ontario

2003 Ontario general election
Party	Candidate	Votes	%	±%
Liberal	Michael Gravelle	21,938	72.45	+11.55
New Democratic	Bonnie Satten	4,548	15.02	–3.53
Progressive Conservative	Brent Sylvester	2,912	9.62	–8.36
Green	Carl Rose	882	2.91	+1.70
Total valid votes		30,280	99.47	
Total rejected, unmarked and declined ballots		160	0.53	–0.20
Turnout		30,440	55.61	+0.67
Eligible voters		54,743		
Liberal hold		Swing		+7.54
Source: Elections Ontario

1999 Ontario general election
Party	Candidate	Votes	%
Liberal	Michael Gravelle	19,249	60.90
New Democratic	Nathalie Galesloot	5,864	18.55
Progressive Conservative	Ed Linkewich	5,683	17.98
Independent	Robert Woito	431	1.36
Green	Carl Rose	382	1.21
Total valid votes		31,609	99.27
Total rejected, unmarked and declined ballots		232	0.73
Turnout		31,841	54.94
Eligible voters		57,961	
Liberal pickup new district.			
Source: Elections Ontario

== 2007 electoral reform referendum ==
2007 Ontario electoral reform referendum
Side	Votes	%
First Past the Post	18,643	67.7
Mixed member proportional	8,903	32.3
Total valid votes	27,546	100.0

== See also ==
- List of Ontario provincial electoral districts
- Canadian provincial electoral districts
