= Judith Monteith-Farrell =

Canadian politician

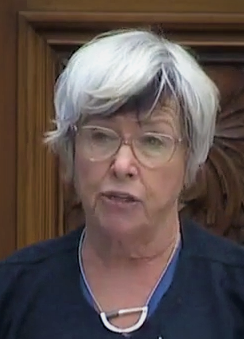

Critic, Natural Resources and Forestry
- In office August 23, 2018 – June 3, 2022
- Leader: Andrea Horwath

Member of the Ontario Provincial Parliament for Thunder Bay—Atikokan
- In office June 7, 2018 – May 3, 2022
- Preceded by: Bill Mauro
- Succeeded by: Kevin Holland

Personal details
- Party: New Democratic

Judith Monteith-Farrell is a Canadian politician, who was elected to the Legislative Assembly of Ontario in the 2018 provincial election. She represented the electoral district of Thunder Bay—Atikokan as a member of the Ontario New Democratic Party until her defeat in the 2022 provincial election.

== Electoral record ==
2022 Ontario general election: Thunder Bay—Atikokan
Party	Candidate	Votes	%	±%	Expenditures
Progressive Conservative	Kevin Holland	9,657	36.31	+13.08	$57,863
New Democratic	Judith Monteith-Farrell	8,759	32.93	−3.33	$84,682
Liberal	Rob Barrett	6,486	24.39	−11.62	$43,988
Green	Eric Arner	781	2.94	+0.23	$509
New Blue	David Tommasini	529	1.99		$2,767
Ontario Party	Dan Criger	248	0.93		$0
Northern Ontario Heritage	Kenneth Jones	138	0.52	−0.92	$0
Total valid votes/expense limit		26,598	99.39	+0.36	$97,107
Total rejected, unmarked, and declined ballots		163	0.61	-0.36	
Turnout		26,761	43.09	-11.65	
Eligible voters		61,879			
Progressive Conservative gain from New Democratic		Swing		+8.20	
Source(s): "Summary of Valid Votes Cast for Each Candidate" (PDF). Elections Ontario. 2022. Archived from the original on 2023-05-18.; "Statistical Summary by Electoral District" (PDF). Elections Ontario. 2022. Archived from the original on 2023-05-21.

2018 Ontario general election: Thunder Bay—Atikokan
Party	Candidate	Votes	%	±%
New Democratic	Judith Monteith-Farrell	11,793	36.26	+8.10
Liberal	Bill Mauro	11,712	36.01	-16.93
Progressive Conservative	Brandon Postuma	7,555	23.22	+10.05
Green	John Northey	880	2.71	-0.65
Northern Ontario	David Bruno	469	1.44	+0.98
Libertarian	Dorothy Snell	116	0.36	-1.54
Total valid votes		32,525	100.0	
New Democratic gain from Liberal		Swing		+12.51
Source: Elections Ontario
