= Steve Mantis =

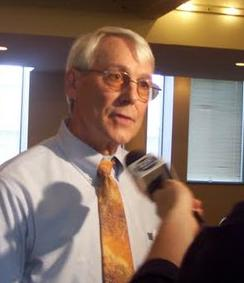
- Mantis interviewed after winning the NDP nomination in Thunder Bay-Superior North, June 30, 2011
- Born: Reading, Pennsylvania
- Citizenship: Canadian
- Education: Phillips Exeter Academy; Stanford University
- Occupations: Small businessperson, community organizer
- Years active: over 30 years
- Known for: Community Work/Disability rights activist
- Political party: Ontario New Democratic Party (ONDP)
- Board member of: Ontario Workers' Compensation Board (1990-1994), Occupational Health Clinic for Ontario Workers (2003-present), Lakehead Planning Board, Bay Credit Union Board (2002-2008), Community Support Services Council (1999-2003), Canadian Injured Workers' Alliance (1990-2001), Summer Solstice Festival Board (1982-1988), Lakehead Rural Planning Board (1980-1989)
- Awards: Judge George Ferguson Award, Credit Union Central of Ontario Social Responsibility Award
- Website: www.stevemantis.ca

Stephen Arthur "Steve" Mantis (born January 18, 1950) is a Canadian advocate for injured workers and people with disabilities. Best known for years of volunteer efforts to build a "fair and comprehensive" system for workers injured on the job, Mantis organized injured worker self-help groups locally in Thunder Bay, then regionally in Northwestern Ontario by co-founding the Ontario Network of Injured Workers Groups and nationally by co-founding the Canadian Injured Workers Alliance. Mantis was appointed to the Board of Directors of the Ontario Workers Compensation Board from 1991 to 1994.

Mantis was nominated as a candidate in the provincial electoral district of Thunder Bay-Superior North in the 2011 Ontario general election. He is a member of the Ontario New Democratic Party.

== Background ==
Mantis was born in 1950 in Reading, Pennsylvania, the second of five children to James Hamilton Mantis and Georgina Mantis. He graduated from Phillips Exeter Academy in 1968. After immigrating to Canada in 1972, Mantis has lived and worked near Thunder Bay, Ontario ever since.

=== Work ===
In his professional life Mantis has worked as a carpenter, founded and operated his own construction company, and managed vocational training for the Northwestern Ontario March of Dimes. In September 1978 Mantis was injured in an industrial accident, losing his left arm. Before 1996, Mantis was an employment services manager in the Thunder Bay Regional Office of the Ontario March of Dimes during a time of transition for the organization into one providing modern vocational training. Since 2004, Mantis has been the community co-lead in the Community-University Research Alliance on the Consequences of Work Injury with McMaster University.

=== Community engagement ===
After serving on local area roads boards in the 1980s, Mantis went on to represent rural residents on the Lakehead Planning Board.

Mantis has spent 30 years in efforts to build a "comprehensive, fair system for all workers injured on the job." After organizing locally, Mantis organized regionally by forming self-help groups and undertaking ongoing government lobbying through a provincial group he co-founded - the Ontario Network of Injured Workers Groups. Mantis then used links built with organized labour and injured workers groups in other provinces to create the first National Injured Workers Conference in 1990, which led him to co-found the Canadian Injured Workers Alliance (CIWA). Mantis was elected national coordinator of CIWA from 1996 to 2002.

Mantis was appointed to the board of directors of the Workers Compensation Board (now called the WSIB) from 1991 to 1994, and currently serves on the board of the Occupational Health Clinics for Ontario Workers, a WSIB-funded network of clinics providing comprehensive occupational health services to injured workers across Ontario.

More recently, Mantis has developed and taught a Speakers School for vulnerable adults, such as people living in poverty, single moms, First Nations and Métis people, people with disabilities and the unemployed, in order teach skills the disadvantaged may use to have more control over their lives and address social inequities. He is founding chair of the board of directors of the Speakers School in Thunder Bay.

=== Awards ===
Mantis has received the national Judge George Ferguson Award for "contributing in an outstanding way by enabling equality and full community participation for people with physical disabilities throughout Canada.", the Credit Union Central of Ontario Social Responsibility Award, the Canada 125th Anniversary Medal from Veterans Affairs Canada for Canadians who have made "a significant contribution to their fellow citizens, to their community, or to Canada," and the Ron Ellis Award from the Ontario Bar Association for "exceptional contributions and achievements in the field of workers' compensation law".

== Electoral record ==
2011 Ontario general election
Party	Candidate	Votes	%	±%
Liberal	Michael Gravelle	11,765	45.00	-1.78
New Democratic	Steve Mantis	9,111	34.85	-3.41
Progressive Conservative	Anthony LeBlanc	4,578	17.51	+8.11
Green	Scot Kyle	555	2.12	-3.43
Libertarian	Tony Gallo	133	0.51	
Total valid votes		26,142	100.0	
Total rejected, unmarked and declined ballots		97	0.37	
Turnout		26,239	48.20	
Eligible voters		54,443		
Source: Elections Ontario
