= Guy Bourgouin =

Canadian politician

Guy Bourgouin MPP
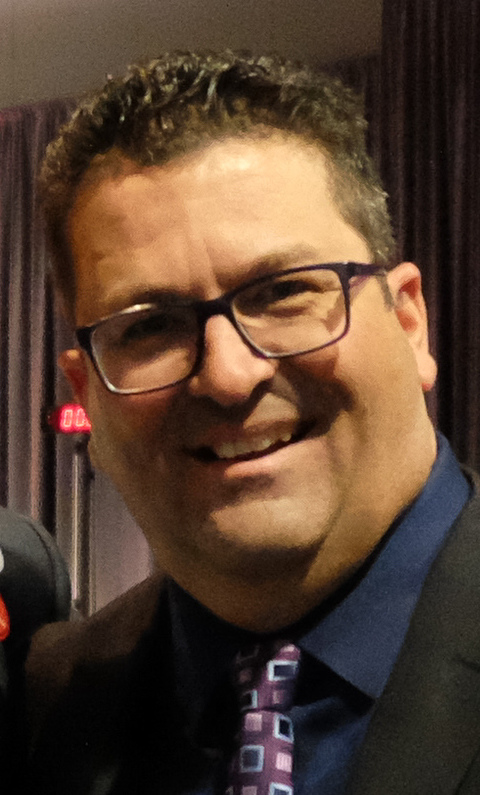
- Bourgouin in 2019

Critic, Francophone Affairs
- Incumbent
- Assumed office August 23, 2018
- Leader: Marit Stiles

Member of the Ontario Provincial Parliament for Mushkegowuk—James Bay
- Incumbent
- Assumed office June 7, 2018
- Preceded by: Riding established

Personal details
- Born: Dubreuilville, Ontario, Canada
- Party: New Democratic
- Occupation: Union leader

Guy Bourgouin is a Canadian politician, who was elected to the Legislative Assembly of Ontario in the 2018 provincial election. He represents the riding of Mushkegowuk—James Bay as a member of the Ontario New Democratic Party.

Bourgouin was born and raised in Dubreuilville, Ontario. He is of Métis heritage. Prior to being elected in the 2018 Ontario general election, he was president of a United Steelworkers local in Kapuskasing.

== Political career ==
In the 2018 election, Bourgouin was elected in the newly-created riding of Mushkegowuk—James Bay. He was one of three MPPs of Indigenous heritage elected in 2018, alongside NDP caucus colleagues Suze Morrison and Sol Mamakwa.

Throughout his political career, Bourgouin has frequently advocated for improving road safety in Northern Ontario. The first bill he tabled in the Legislative Assembly of Ontario, in June 2019, proposed increased winter maintenance on Ontario Highway 11 and Ontario Highway 17. The bill was defeated on November 7, after the Progressive Conservatives voted against. In November 2023, Bourgouin proposed Chad's Law; named after Kapuskasing resident Chad Bélanger, who was seriously injured in a head-on traffic collision. The law would have prohibited drivers from crossing a double-yellow centerline to pass, as is the case in every other province of Canada. The bill was not voted on by the legislature before it was dissolved for the 2025 Ontario general election.

Bourgouin has advocated for increased access to healthcare in Northern Ontario. Specifically, he has criticized the state of obstetric care, and the limited availability of healthcare services in French.

Bourgouin has also criticized Doug Ford's Progressive Conservative government for failing to address the ongoing housing crisis in the Attawapiskat First Nation.

As of August 11, 2024, he serves as the Official Opposition critic for Francophone Affairs, Mining, Natural Resources and Forestry.

Bourgouin won his seat in the 2025 Ontario general election by four votes. A recount is expected. After recount it was declared he won by nine votes.

== Electoral record ==
2025 Ontario general election: Mushkegowuk—James Bay
Party	Candidate	Votes	%	±%	Expenditures
New Democratic	Guy Bourgouin	3,610	45.47	–1.71	$30,077
Progressive Conservative	Dave Plourde	3,602	45.37	+9.62	$23,617
Liberal	Kyle Allen	613	7.72	–4.02	$0
Green	Catherine Jones	114	1.44	–0.50	$0
Total valid votes/expense limit		7,939	98.50	–1.12	$43,096
Total rejected, unmarked, and declined ballots		121	1.50	+1.12	
Turnout		8,060	42.98	+3.58	
Eligible voters		18,755			
New Democratic hold		Swing		–5.67	
Source: Elections Ontario

2022 Ontario general election: Mushkegowuk—James Bay
Party	Candidate	Votes	%	±%	Expenditures
New Democratic	Guy Bourgouin	3,423	47.18	−4.59	$26,064
Progressive Conservative	Eric Côté	2,594	35.75	+5.78	$26,496
Liberal	Matthew Pronovost	852	11.74	−2.54	$11,168
New Blue	Mike Buckley	222	3.06		$0
Green	Catherine Jones	141	1.94	+0.15	$0
Confederation of Regions	Fauzia Sadiq	23	0.32	+0.18	$0
Total valid votes/expense limit		7,255	99.62	+0.67	$36,252
Total rejected, unmarked, and declined ballots		28	0.38	-0.67	
Turnout		7,283	39.40	-14.65	
Eligible voters		18,639			
New Democratic hold		Swing		−5.18	
Source(s): "Summary of Valid Votes Cast for Each Candidate" (PDF). Elections Ontario. 2022. Archived from the original on 2023-05-18.; "Statistical Summary by Electoral District" (PDF). Elections Ontario. 2022. Archived from the original on 2023-05-21.

2018 Ontario general election: Mushkegowuk—James Bay
Party	Candidate	Votes	%	±%	Expenditures
New Democratic	Guy Bourgouin	4,827	51.77	–8.47	$27,629
Progressive Conservative	André Robichaud	2,795	29.98	+22.26	$29,239
Liberal	Gaëtan Baillargeon	1,332	14.29	–16.01	$10,283
Green	Sarah Hutchinson	164	1.79	+0.39	none listed
Northern Ontario	Jacques Joseph Ouellette	152	1.63	N/A	none listed
Libertarian	Vanda Marshall	38	0.41	N/A	none listed
Confederation of Regions	Fauzia Sadiq	13	0.14	N/A	$0
Total valid votes		9,324	98.95		
Total rejected, unmarked and declined ballots		99	1.05		
Turnout		9,423	54.05		
Eligible voters		17,435			
New Democratic notional hold		Swing		–15.37	
Source: Elections Ontario
