= Elisabeth Arnold =

Canadian politician

Ottawa City Councillor
- In office 1994–2003
- Preceded by: Peter Harris
- Succeeded by: Diane Holmes
- Constituency: Somerset Ward

Personal details
- Born: 1959 (age 66–67)
- Party: New Democratic Party
- Education: Queen's University; Simon Fraser University

Elisabeth Arnold (born 1959 in Ottawa) was an Ottawa City Councillor who represented Somerset Ward from 1994 to 2003. One of her accomplishments on council was spearheading the rebuilding of the Plant Recreation Centre.

Arnold graduated from Lisgar Collegiate Institute and earned a Bachelor's Degree in Geography from Simon Fraser University and a Master's in Urban Planning from Queen's University.

From 1979 to 1984 she was a member of the Canadian national canoe team. From 1986 to 1988 she was the coordinator for Housing Help, which provided help for people in regard to housing needs. From 1989 to 1992 she was the coordinator of the Community Development Program at the Sandy Hill Community Health Centre. She has also worked with a number of volunteer groups.

During the 1993 federal election, Arnold was the affirmative action coordinator for the New Democratic Party.

She ran for the Ontario New Democratic Party in the 1999 provincial election in Ottawa Centre. She won nearly 12,000 votes, 6,000 behind winner Richard Patten of the Liberals.

Arnold is now the Director for the Centre for Sustainable Community Development at the Federation of Canadian Municipalities.

== Electoral record ==
1999 Ontario general election: Ottawa Centre
Party	Candidate	Votes	%	±%	Expenditures
Liberal	Richard Patten	17,956	38.17	−1.09	$ 48,983.01
Progressive Conservative	Ray Kostuch	15,403	32.74	+9.10	54,104.81
New Democratic	Elisabeth Arnold	11,977	25.46	−7.77	58,863.46
Green	Chris Bradshaw	1,231	2.62	+1.39	4,119.65
Communist	Marvin Glass	174	0.37	−0.37	1,384.26
Natural Law	Wayne Foster	170	0.36	−0.93	0.00
Independent	Mistahi Corkill	132	0.28		0.00
Total valid votes/expense limit		47,043	100.0	+65.64	$ 85,987.20
Total rejected ballots		395	0.83	−0.27	
Turnout		47,438	52.96	−10.92	
Eligible voters		89,570		+99.23	
Source(s) "General Election of June 3 1999 — Summary of Valid Ballots by Candidate". Elections Ontario. "General Election of June 3 1999 — Statistical Summary". Elections Ontario. "1999 Summary of Income and Campaign Expenses – Candidate Campaign Returns (CR-1)".

2000 Ottawa City Council Election: Somerset Ward
Candidate	Votes	%
Elisabeth Arnold (X)	6,517	75.77
Olivia Bradley	2,084	24.2

1997 Ottawa City Council Election: Somerset Ward
Candidate	Votes	%
Elisabeth Arnold (X)	4,004	78.16
Kris Schimmel	1,119	21.84

1994 Ottawa City Council Election: Somerset Ward
Candidate	Votes	%
Elisabeth Arnold	4,529	50.48
Peter Harris (X)	4,443	49.52

Preceded by Peter Harris (Dalhousie Ward); Diane Holmes (Wellington Ward)	City councillors from Somerset Ward; 1994-2003	Succeeded by Diane Holmes
