= Lise Vaugeois =

Canadian politician

Lise Vaugeois MPP
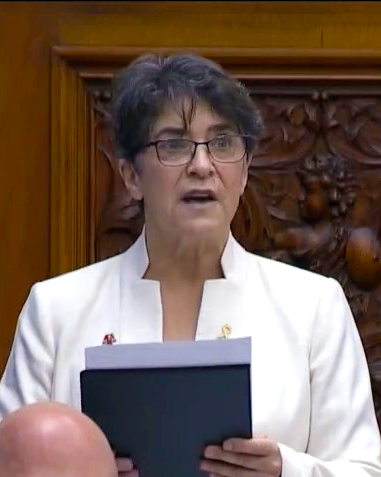
- Vaugeois in 2022

Critic, Seniors; Persons Living with Disabilities and Accessibility
- Incumbent
- Assumed office July 13, 2022

Member of the Ontario Provincial Parliament for Thunder Bay—Superior North
- Incumbent
- Assumed office June 2, 2022
- Preceded by: Michael Gravelle

Personal details
- Party: Ontario New Democratic Party
- Education: University of Toronto; Lakehead University

Lise Vaugeois is a Canadian politician and academic. A member of the Ontario New Democratic Party, Vaugeois was elected to represent district of Thunder Bay—Superior North in the Legislative Assembly of Ontario in the 2022 election.

== Biography ==
Prior to entering politics, Vaugeois was a professor at the Lakehead University. She moved to Thunder Bay to play in the Thunder Bay Symphony Orchestra.

=== Political career ===
In the 2018 Ontario general election, Vaugeois unsuccessfully contested the district of Thunder Bay—Superior North. In the 2022 election, she won the district. In this election, Vaugeois was notable for being the only candidate who gained a seat previously held by the Ontario Liberal Party. Thunder Bay—Superior North was also one of two districts gained by the Ontario New Democratic Party in the 2022 election (the other being Ottawa West—Nepean).

In January 2024, Aditya Birla Group made the decision to close its pulp and paper mill in Terrace Bay, laying off approximately 400 workers. Vaugeois called for the government to reach a deal with Aditya Birla to reopen the mill and provide support to the workers and their families.

As of August 11, 2024, she serves as the Official Opposition critic for Seniors, Persons Living with Disabilities, Accessibility, WSIB (Workplace Safety and Insurance Board), and Injured Workers.

In October 2024, Vaugeois criticized the Conservative government for the state of road safety in Northern Ontario, specifically mentioning a lack of inspections and a rising number of fraudulent commercial trucking licenses.

Throughout 2024, Vaugeois advocated for reducing barriers for wildland firefighters to access sickness benefits through the Workplace Safety and Insurance Board.

Vaugeois endorsed Avi Lewis in the 2026 New Democratic Party leadership election.

== Electoral record ==
2025 Ontario general election: Thunder Bay—Superior North
Party	Candidate	Votes	%	±%	Expenditures
New Democratic	Lise Vaugeois	11,137	40.57	+6.45	$75,763
Progressive Conservative	Rick Dumas	9,348	34.05	+3.18	$50,764
Liberal	Brian Hamilton	5,846	21.30	–6.98	$64,273
Green	John Northey	437	1.59	–1.41	$0
Northern Ontario	Daniel K. Campbell	336	1.22	+0.63	$0
New Blue	Katherine Suutari	266	0.97	–0.30	$78
Independent	Steve Hanssen	82	0.30	N/A	$0
Total valid votes/expense limit		27,452	99.34	±0.00	$145,377
Total rejected, unmarked, and declined ballots		183	0.66	±0.00	
Turnout		27,635	50.24	+7.00	
Eligible voters		55,006			
New Democratic hold		Swing		+1.64	
Source: Elections Ontario

2022 Ontario general election: Thunder Bay—Superior North
Party	Candidate	Votes	%	±%	Expenditures
New Democratic	Lise Vaugeois	8,404	34.12	−3.04	$82,144
Progressive Conservative	Peng You	7,604	30.87	+12.91	$51,833
Liberal	Shelby Ch'ng	6,966	28.28	−11.59	$31,738
Green	Tracey MacKinnon	738	3.00	+0.21	$381
Ontario Party	Stephen Hufnagel	338	1.37		$215
New Blue	Katherine Suutari	314	1.27		$2,301
Northern Ontario Heritage	Andy Wolff	145	0.59	−0.66	$0
Consensus Ontario	Adam Cherry	125	0.51		$0
Total valid votes/expense limit		24,634	99.34	+0.21	$90,488
Total rejected, unmarked, and declined ballots		165	0.66	-0.21	
Turnout		24,799	43.24	-10.60	
Eligible voters		57,378			
New Democratic gain from Liberal		Swing		−7.97	
Source(s): "Summary of Valid Votes Cast for Each Candidate" (PDF). Elections Ontario. 2022. Archived from the original on 2023-05-18.; "Statistical Summary by Electoral District" (PDF). Elections Ontario. 2022. Archived from the original on 2023-05-21.

2018 Ontario general election: Thunder Bay—Superior North
Party	Candidate	Votes	%	±%
Liberal	Michael Gravelle	11,973	39.86	-16.11
New Democratic	Lise Vaugeois	11,160	37.16	+7.69
Progressive Conservative	Derek Parks	5,395	17.96	+10.78
Green	Amanda Moddejonge	838	2.79	-0.81
Northern Ontario	Andy Wolff	376	1.25	+0.79
Libertarian	Tony Gallo	148	0.49	-2.83
Trillium	Louise Ewen	145	0.48	
Total valid votes		30,035	99.13	
Total rejected, unmarked and declined ballots		264	0.87	+0.08
Turnout		30,299	53.84	+3.43
Eligible voters		56,277		
Liberal hold		Swing		-11.90
Source: Elections Ontario
