= Mushkegowuk—James Bay =

Provincial electoral district in Ontario, Canada

Coordinates: 52.8°N 83.7°W

Ontario electoral district
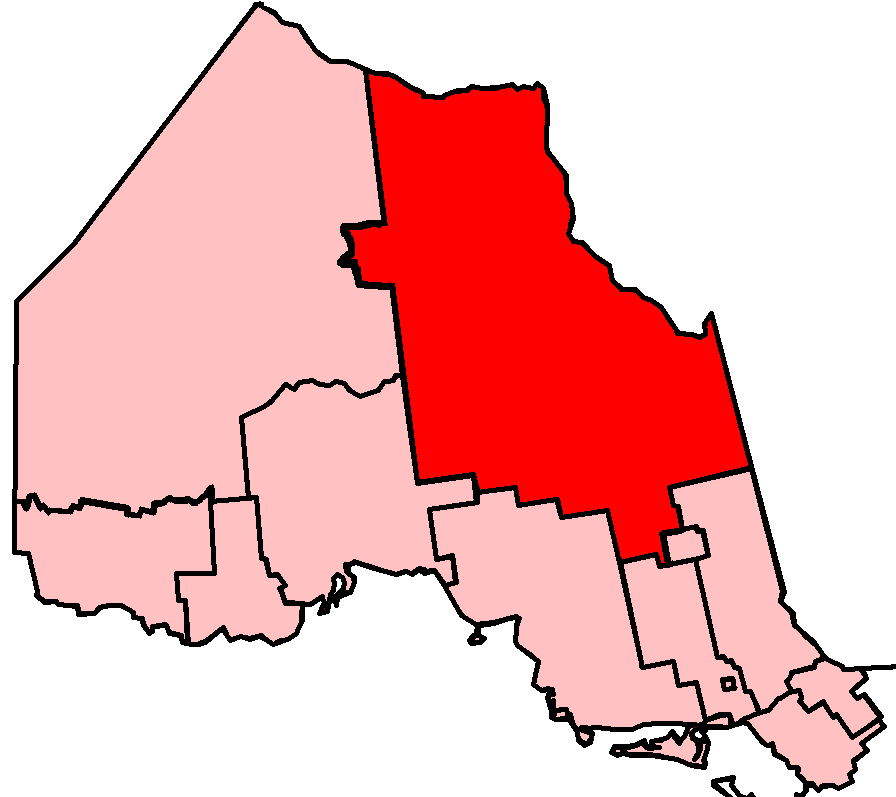

Provincial electoral district
- Legislature: Legislative Assembly of Ontario
MPP
Guy Bourgouin
New Democratic
- District created: 2017
- First contested: 2018
- Last contested: 2025

Demographics
- Population (2016): 30,037
- Electors (2018): 17,435
- Area (km²): 254,894
- Pop. density (per km²): 0.12
- Census division(s): Cochrane District, Kenora District

Mushkegowuk—James Bay (French: Mushkegowuk—Baie James) is a provincial electoral district in Ontario, Canada. It elects one member to the Legislative Assembly of Ontario. This riding was created from the northern portion of Timmins—James Bay by the Far North Electoral Boundaries Commission in 2017. The Legislative Assembly of Ontario approved the new riding on October 24, 2017.

Unlike most Ontario provincial districts, Mushkegowuk—James Bay does not have the same boundaries as a federal district. As well, the riding, with a population of 30,037, is significantly smaller than the average Ontario district (with a population of 110,000) or the average Northern Ontario district (with a population of 76,000). National Post columnist Josh Dehaas criticized of the new ridings of Mushkegowuk—James Bay and Kiiwetinoong as violating the principle of representation by population.

Mushkegowuk—James Bay was originally to be named Mushkegowuk, but the name was changed to Mushkegowuk—James Bay by the legislature, which authorized further consultations over the riding's name by the Attorney General. It is 27 per cent indigenous and 60 per cent francophone. Indigenous leaders have criticized the new riding for not having a high enough percentage of indigenous people.

== Members of Provincial Parliament ==
Mushkegowuk—James Bay
Assembly	Years	Member	Party
Riding created from Timmins—James Bay
42nd	2018–2022	Guy Bourgouin	New Democratic
43rd	2022–2025	Guy Bourgouin	New Democratic
44th	2025–present	Guy Bourgouin	New Democratic

== Election results ==
Winning party in each polling division of Mushkegowuk—James Bay at the 2025 Ontario general election

2025 Ontario general election
Party	Candidate	Votes	%	±%	Expenditures
New Democratic	Guy Bourgouin	3,610	45.47	–1.71	$30,077
Progressive Conservative	Dave Plourde	3,602	45.37	+9.62	$23,617
Liberal	Kyle Allen	613	7.72	–4.02	$0
Green	Catherine Jones	114	1.44	–0.50	$0
Total valid votes/expense limit		7,939	98.50	–1.12	$43,096
Total rejected, unmarked, and declined ballots		121	1.50	+1.12	
Turnout		8,060	42.98	+3.58	
Eligible voters		18,755			
New Democratic hold		Swing		–5.67	
Source: Elections Ontario

Winning party in each polling division of Mushkegowuk—James Bay at the 2022 Ontario general election

2022 Ontario general election
Party	Candidate	Votes	%	±%	Expenditures
New Democratic	Guy Bourgouin	3,423	47.18	−4.59	$26,064
Progressive Conservative	Eric Côté	2,594	35.75	+5.78	$26,496
Liberal	Matthew Pronovost	852	11.74	−2.54	$11,168
New Blue	Mike Buckley	222	3.06		$0
Green	Catherine Jones	141	1.94	+0.15	$0
Confederation of Regions	Fauzia Sadiq	23	0.32	+0.18	$0
Total valid votes/expense limit		7,255	99.62	+0.67	$36,252
Total rejected, unmarked, and declined ballots		28	0.38	-0.67	
Turnout		7,283	39.40	-14.65	
Eligible voters		18,639			
New Democratic hold		Swing		−5.18	
Source(s): "Summary of Valid Votes Cast for Each Candidate" (PDF). Elections Ontario. 2022. Archived from the original on May 18, 2023.; "Statistical Summary by Electoral District" (PDF). Elections Ontario. 2022. Archived from the original on May 21, 2023.

2018 Ontario general election
Party	Candidate	Votes	%	±%	Expenditures
New Democratic	Guy Bourgouin	4,827	51.77	–8.47	$27,629
Progressive Conservative	André Robichaud	2,795	29.98	+22.26	$29,239
Liberal	Gaëtan Baillargeon	1,332	14.29	–16.01	$10,283
Green	Sarah Hutchinson	164	1.79	+0.39	none listed
Northern Ontario	Jacques Joseph Ouellette	152	1.63	N/A	none listed
Libertarian	Vanda Marshall	38	0.41	N/A	none listed
Confederation of Regions	Fauzia Sadiq	13	0.14	N/A	$0
Total valid votes		9,324	98.95		
Total rejected, unmarked and declined ballots		99	1.05		
Turnout		9,423	54.05		
Eligible voters		17,435			
New Democratic notional hold		Swing		–15.37	
Source: Elections Ontario

2014 general election redistributed results
Party	Vote	%
New Democratic	5,038	60.26
Liberal	2,533	30.30
Progressive Conservative	647	7.73
Green	114	1.37
Others	28	0.34

== See also ==
- List of Ontario provincial electoral districts
- Canadian provincial electoral districts
