= Thunder Bay—Atikokan (provincial electoral district) =

Provincial electoral district in Ontario, Canada

Coordinates: 48.86°N 90.04°W

Ontario electoral district
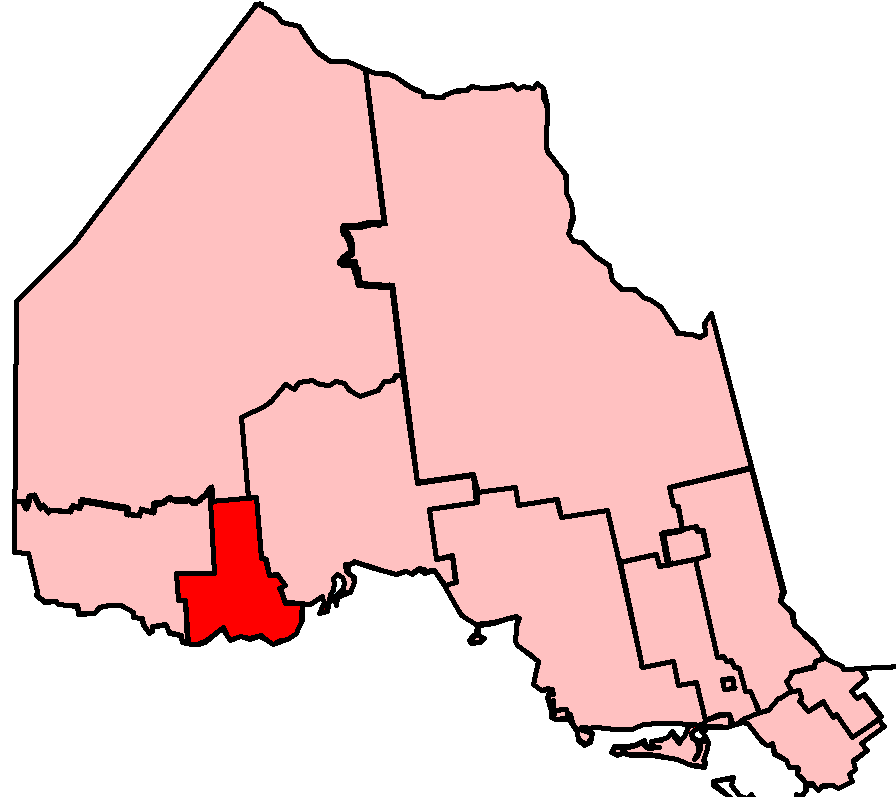

Provincial electoral district
- Legislature: Legislative Assembly of Ontario
MPP
Kevin Holland
Progressive Conservative
- District created: 1999
- First contested: 1999
- Last contested: 2025

Demographics
- Population (2016): 75,920
- Electors (2018): 59,996
- Area (km²): 25,653
- Pop. density (per km²): 3
- Census division(s): Thunder Bay District, Rainy River District

Thunder Bay—Atikokan is a provincial electoral district in northwestern Ontario, Canada, that has been represented in the Legislative Assembly of Ontario since 1999.

The electoral district was created from Port Arthur, Fort William, Lake Nipigon and Rainy River in 1999 when Ontario was divided into the same electoral districts as those used for federal electoral purposes. They were redistributed whenever a readjustment took place at the federal level.

In 2005, legislation was passed by the Legislature to divide Ontario into 107 electoral districts, beginning with the next provincial election in 2007. The eleven northern electoral districts, including Thunder Bay—Atikokan, are those defined for federal purposes in 1996, based on the 1991 census (except for a minor boundary adjustment). The 96 southern electoral districts are those defined for federal electoral purposes in 2003, based on the 2001 census. Without this legislation, the number of electoral districts in northern Ontario would have been reduced from eleven to ten.

== Members ==
Thunder Bay—Atikokan
Assembly	Years	Member	Party
Riding created from Port Arthur, Fort William, Lake Nipigon and Rainy River
37th	1999–2003	Lyn McLeod	Liberal
38th	2003–2007	Bill Mauro	Liberal
39th	2007–2011	Bill Mauro	Liberal
40th	2011–2014	Bill Mauro	Liberal
41st	2014–2018	Bill Mauro	Liberal
42nd	2018–2022	Judith Monteith-Farrell	New Democratic
43rd	2022–2025	Kevin Holland	Progressive Conservative
44th	2025–present	Kevin Holland	Progressive Conservative

== Election results ==
Winning party in each polling division of Thunder Bay—Atikokan at the 2025 Ontario general election

2025 Ontario general election
Party	Candidate	Votes	%	±%	Expenditures
Progressive Conservative	Kevin Holland	13,727	45.71	+9.41	$72,862
New Democratic	Judith Monteith-Farrell	7,766	25.86	–7.07	$58,788
Liberal	Stephen Margarit	7,398	24.64	+0.25	$36,388
New Blue	Martin Tempelman	497	1.66	–0.33	$4,159
Green	Eric Arner	457	1.52	–1.41	$0
Northern Ontario Heritage	K.C. Jones	184	0.61	+0.09	$0
Total valid votes/expense limit		30,029	99.30	–	$110,514
Total rejected, unmarked and declined ballots		213	0.70	+0.10	
Turnout		30,242	49.28	+6.19	
Eligible voters		61,373			
Progressive Conservative hold		Swing		+8.24	
Source: Elections Ontario

Winning party in each polling division of Thunder Bay—Atikokan at the 2022 Ontario general election

2022 Ontario general election
Party	Candidate	Votes	%	±%	Expenditures
Progressive Conservative	Kevin Holland	9,657	36.31	+13.08	$57,863
New Democratic	Judith Monteith-Farrell	8,759	32.93	–3.33	$84,682
Liberal	Rob Barrett	6,486	24.39	–11.62	$43,988
Green	Eric Arner	781	2.94	+0.23	$509
New Blue	David Tommasini	529	1.99	–	$2,767
Ontario Party	Dan Criger	248	0.93	–	$0
Northern Ontario Heritage	Kenneth Jones	138	0.52	–0.92	$0
Total valid votes/expense limit		26,598	99.39	–	$97,107
Total rejected, unmarked and declined ballots		163	0.61	–0.36	
Turnout		26,761	43.09	–11.65	
Eligible voters		62,107			
Progressive Conservative gain from New Democratic		Swing		+8.20	
Source: Elections Ontario

2018 Ontario general election
Party	Candidate	Votes	%	±%	Expenditures
New Democratic	Judith Monteith-Farrell	11,793	36.26	+8.15	$29,425
Liberal	Bill Mauro	11,712	36.01	–16.97	$59,096
Progressive Conservative	Brandon Postuma	7,555	23.23	+10.04	$34,193
Green	John Northey	880	2.71	–0.66	$81
Northern Ontario Heritage	David Bruno	469	1.44	+0.99	$0
Libertarian	Dorothy Snell	116	0.36	–1.55	
Total valid votes		32,525	99.03		
Total rejected, unmarked and declined ballots		317	0.97	+0.17	
Turnout		32,842	54.74	+5.72	
Eligible voters		59,996			
New Democratic gain from Liberal		Swing		+12.56	
Source: Elections Ontario

2014 Ontario general election
Party	Candidate	Votes	%	±%
Liberal	Bill Mauro	15,176	52.98	+14.01
New Democratic	Mary Kozorys	8,052	28.11	–9.21
Progressive Conservative	Harold Wilson	3,779	13.19	–8.77
Green	John Northey	964	3.37	+1.93
Libertarian	Joe Talarico	547	1.91	–
Northern Ontario Heritage	Ed Deibel	129	0.45	–
Total valid votes		28,647	99.20	
Total rejected, unmarked and declined ballots		231	0.80	+0.43
Turnout		28,878	49.02	+2.42
Eligible voters		58,908		
Liberal hold		Swing		+11.61
Source: Elections Ontario

2011 Ontario general election
Party	Candidate	Votes	%	±%
Liberal	Bill Mauro	10,319	38.97	+1.28
New Democratic	Mary Kozorys	9,881	37.31	–0.20
Progressive Conservative	Fred Gilbert	5,815	21.96	+1.55
Green	Jonathan Milnes	379	1.43	–2.95
Independent	Marvin Robert McMenemy	86	0.32	–
Total valid votes		26,480	99.63	
Total rejected, unmarked and declined ballots		98	0.37	–0.19
Turnout		26,578	46.61	–5.75
Eligible voters		57,027		
Liberal hold		Swing		+0.74
Source: Elections Ontario

2007 Ontario general election
Party	Candidate	Votes	%	±%
Liberal	Bill Mauro	10,928	37.69	–20.56
New Democratic	John Rafferty	10,878	37.52	+15.90
Progressive Conservative	Rebecca Johnson	5,918	20.41	+2.79
Green	Russ Aegard	1,270	4.38	+1.88
Total valid votes		28,994	99.44	
Total rejected, unmarked and declined ballots		164	0.56	–0.03
Turnout		29,158	52.36	–3.24
Eligible voters		55,687		
Liberal hold		Swing		–18.23
Source: Elections Ontario

2003 Ontario general election
Party	Candidate	Votes	%	±%
Liberal	Bill Mauro	17,735	58.25	–5.78
New Democratic	John Rafferty	6,582	21.62	+4.86
Progressive Conservative	Brian McKinnon	5,365	17.62	–1.59
Green	Kristin Boyer	762	2.50	–
Total valid votes		30,444	99.41	
Total rejected, unmarked and declined ballots		180	0.59	–0.10
Turnout		30,624	55.61	+0.14
Eligible voters		55,074		
Liberal hold		Swing		–5.32
Source: Elections Ontario

1999 Ontario general election
Party	Candidate	Votes	%
Liberal	Lyn McLeod	20,268	64.03
Progressive Conservative	John Henderson	6,081	19.21
New Democratic	Jack Drewes	5,304	16.76
Total valid votes		31,653	99.31
Total rejected, unmarked and declined ballots		220	0.69
Turnout		31,873	55.47
Eligible voters		57,464	
Liberal pickup new district.			
Source: Elections Ontario

== 2007 electoral reform referendum ==
2007 Ontario electoral reform referendum
Side	Votes	%
First Past the Post	19,153	67.9
Mixed member proportional	9,056	32.1
Total valid votes	28,209	100.0

== See also ==
- List of Ontario provincial electoral districts
- Canadian provincial electoral districts
