= Centretown West =

- Neighbourhood
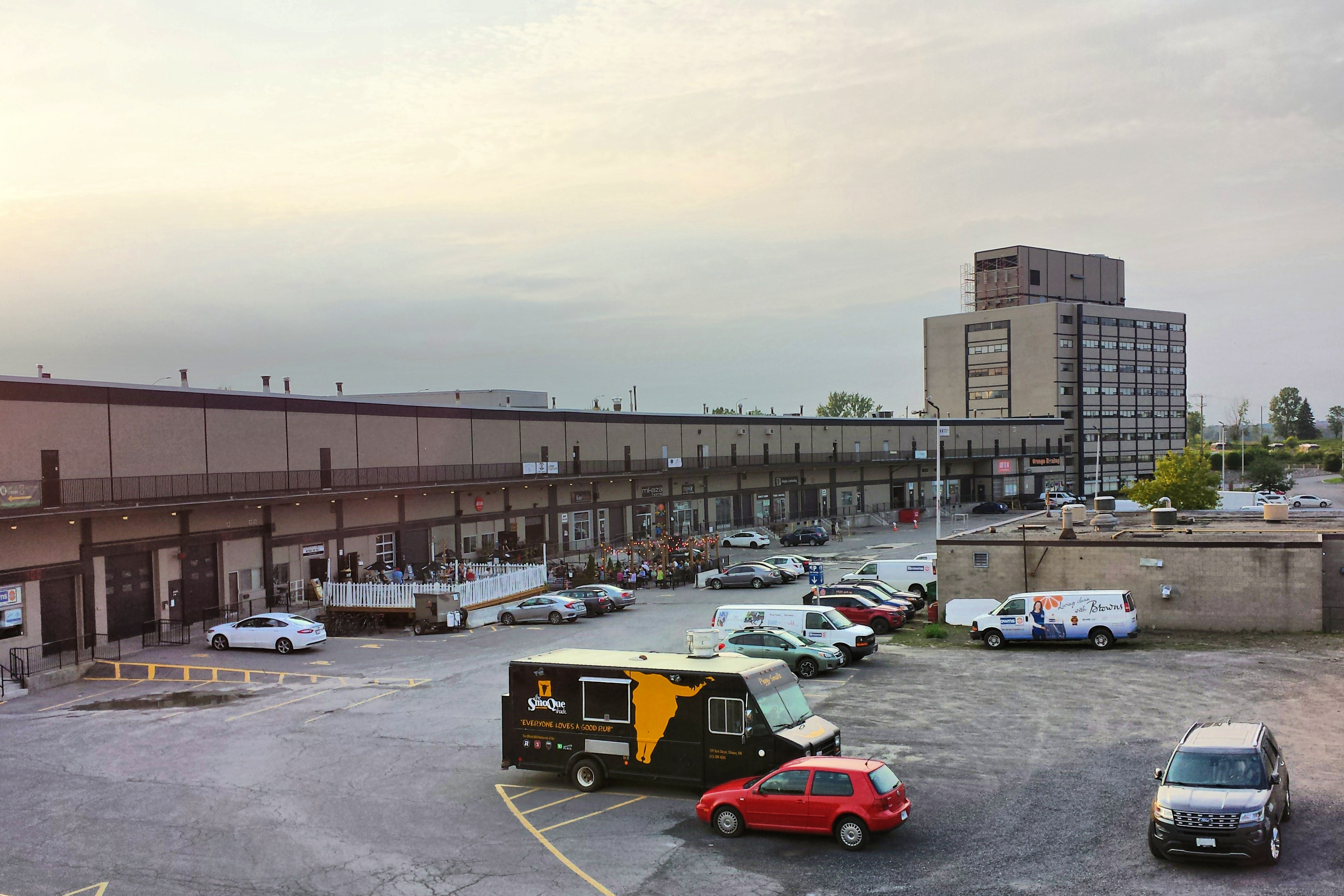
- City Centre complex

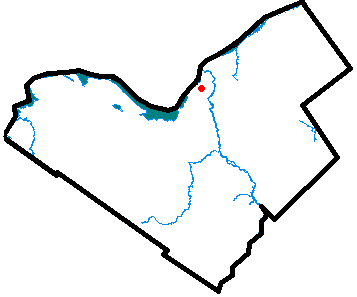
- Location of Centretown West in Ottawa
- Coordinates: 45°24′30″N 75°42′30″W
- Country: Canada
- Province: Ontario
- City: Ottawa

Government
  - MPs: Yasir Naqvi
  - MPPs: Catherine McKenney
  - Councillors: Ariel Troster
  - Governing body: Dalhousie Community Association
- Elevation: 70 m (230 ft)

Population (2021)
  - Total: 10,074
- Canada 2021 Census
- Time zone: UTC-5 (Eastern (EST))

Centretown West, also known as West Centretown or Dalhousie, is a neighbourhood in Somerset Ward in central Ottawa, Ontario, Canada. It is home to the city's Little Italy and Chinatown enclaves.

The Ottawa Neighbourhood Study defines the neighbourhood as lying to the west of Bronson Avenue and LeBreton Street South (south of the Queensway), to the east of O-Train Line 2, north of Carling Avenue, and south of Scott Street, near Nanny Goat Hill. To the east lies Centretown, to the north lies Lebreton Flats, to the west lies Hintonburg, and to the south lies Dow's Lake. At its narrowest definition, the neighbourhood's northern boundary is Somerset and its southern boundary is the Queensway.

Historically, the area was part of Dalhousie Ward until 1994. The community association for the area is the Dalhousie Community Association. The local food bank is the Dalhousie Food Cupboard.

== Nomenclature ==
Some area residents reject the name Centretown West as not reflecting the area's history. Planning documents from the City of Ottawa refer to the area as both Dalhousie and Centretown West, while the Ottawa Neighbourhood Study refers to the area as "West Centretown". The community association is currently considering renaming itself to The West Somerset Community Association.

== History ==
The area was annexed by the city of Ottawa in 1888. Prior to that it was part of Nepean Township, and the community was known as Rochesterville.

Until the 1960s, the neighbourhood was working class, and home to a largely Francophone and Italian population. Federal government expropriation and the widening of the neighbourhood's arterial roads were blamed contributed to a decline in population thereafter. Much of the Italian population moved out of the neighbourhood in the 1970s, and were replaced by lower income residents and newer immigrants from China and Vietnam.

== Character ==
The neighbourhood is composed largely of low-density residential commercial properties, and some light industrial uses. Somerset Street West is dominated by Chinese and Vietnamese businesses, and it is considered to be Ottawa's Chinatown. It also retains a large Italian-Canadian population in Little Italy centred on Preston Street, which is also called "Corso Italia". A portion of Gladstone Avenue is also called "Via Marconi", after the Italian inventor who completed some of his work in Canada.

Its population in 2021 was 10,074.

== See also ==
- List of Ottawa neighbourhoods
