= Catherine McKenney =

Canadian politician (born 1961)

Catherine McKenney MPP
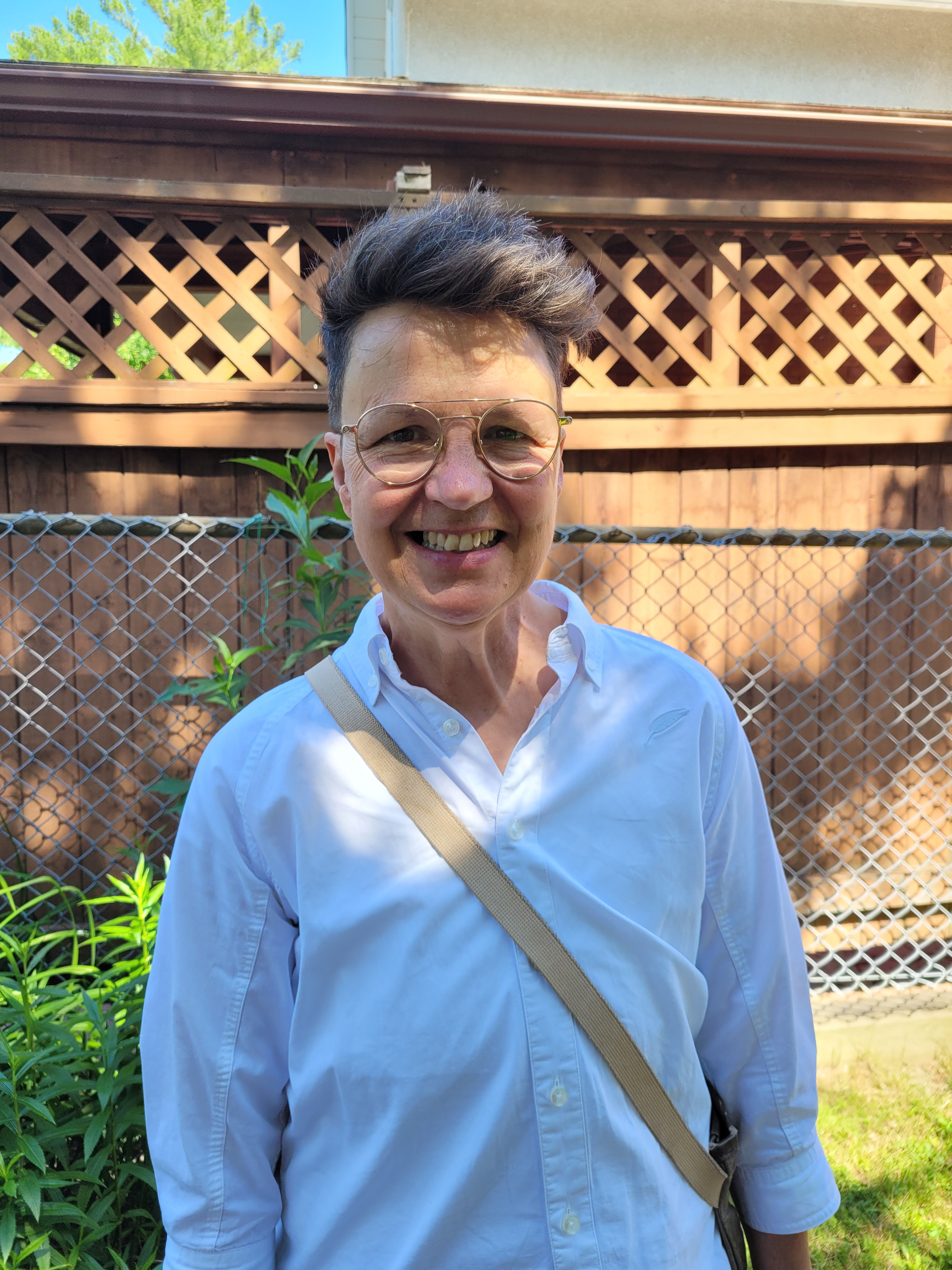
- McKenney in 2022

Member of the Ontario Provincial Parliament for Ottawa Centre
- Incumbent
- Assumed office February 27, 2025
- Preceded by: Joel Harden

Ottawa City Councillor
- In office December 1, 2014 – November 15, 2022
- Preceded by: Diane Holmes
- Succeeded by: Ariel Troster
- Constituency: Ward 14 Somerset

Personal details
- Born: June 3, 1961 (age 65) Fort-Coulonge, Quebec, Canada
- Party: Ontario New Democratic
- Spouse(s): Catharine Vandelinde (m. circa 2005)
- Children: 3
- Education: University of Ottawa (BSocSc, 1993)
- Website: catherinemckenney.ontariondp.ca

Catherine McKenney (born June 3, 1961) is a Canadian politician who is the member of Provincial Parliament (MPP) for Ottawa Centre. A member of the Ontario New Democratic Party (NDP), McKenney was elected in the 2025 Ontario general election. McKenney previously served on Ottawa City Council from 2014 to 2022, representing Somerset Ward, and ran to be the mayor of Ottawa in the 2022 Ottawa municipal election, placing second. Before running for office, they worked as an advisor and political staffer.

== Early life, education and career ==
McKenney was born in Fort-Coulonge, Quebec, the child of a forester and stay-at-home parent. The family would then move to Sturgeon Falls, Ontario, where McKenney went to elementary school. In grade 9, McKenney moved to Pembroke, Ontario when their dad got a job at Algonquin College. McKenney had two children in their early 20s, working in fast food and as a photographer's assistant to support them. McKenney moved to Ottawa at the age of 26, where they completed a Bachelor of Social Science at the University of Ottawa in 1993.

After graduating, McKenney lived in Kanata and had a job reading news articles on television for people who are blind.

Prior to holding elected office, McKenney worked as a staffer in the offices of city councillors Diane Holmes and Alex Munter, and federal members of Parliament Ed Broadbent and Paul Dewar. They supported Jim Watson in the 2014 mayoral election.

== Political career ==
McKenney was first elected in the 2014 municipal election to represent Somerset Ward, which consists of Centretown, Centretown West, and the downtown core. During the 2022 Canada convoy protests, McKenney criticized inaction by Ottawa Mayor Jim Watson and the Ottawa Police Service. McKenney virtually joined an Ottawa City Council meeting from the streets of the occupation.

In December 2021, McKenney announced that they would be running for mayor in the 2022 Ottawa municipal election. During the campaign, they were endorsed by figures including Mark Carney and Joel Harden. McKenney lost to Mark Sutcliffe with 119,241 votes to 161,679 votes.

In January 2023, McKenney co-founded CitySHAPES non-profit organization with Ottawa economist Neil Saravanamuttoo to address "climate change, active transportation, transit, affordable housing and ending chronic homelessness."

In October 2024, McKenney launched a campaign for the Ontario NDP nomination in Ottawa Centre. McKenney was announced as the NDP candidate in November 2024, replacing former Ontario NDP MPP Joel Harden, who was announced as the federal NDP candidate in the 2025 Canadian federal election. McKenney won the riding in February 2025.

== Personal life ==
McKenney is queer and is the first non-male openly-LGBT person to serve on Ottawa's city council. McKenney is non-binary and uses they/them pronouns. McKenney has three children.

== Electoral record ==
=== 2025 Ontario provincial election ===
2025 Ontario general election: Ottawa Centre
| Party | Candidate | Votes | % | ±% | Expenditures |
|---|---|---|---|---|---|
| New Democratic | Catherine McKenney | 32,483 | 55.70 | +1.36 | $130,575 |
| Liberal | Thomas Simpson | 13,591 | 23.30 | +0.72 | $84,596 |
| Progressive Conservative | Scott Healey | 9,573 | 16.41 | +0.69 | $13,986 |
| Green | Simon Beckett | 1,550 | 2.66 | –2.21 | $13,220 |
| New Blue | Maria Desouza | 468 | 0.80 | –0.63 | $7,244 |
| Ontario Party | Shannon Boschy | 321 | 0.55 | – | $3,402 |
| Communist | Cashton Perry | 232 | 0.40 | +0.12 | $0 |
| Independent | Josh Rachlis | 102 | 0.17 | +0.07 | $0 |
| Total valid votes/expense limit | | 58,320 | 99.53 | – | $192,174 |
| Total rejected, unmarked and declined ballots | | 277 | 0.47 | –0.00 | |
| Turnout | | 58,597 | 49.09 | –1.65 | |
| Eligible voters | | 119,363 | | | |
| New Democratic hold | | Swing | | +0.32 | |
Source: Elections Ontario

=== 2022 Ottawa municipal election ===
2022 Ottawa municipal election: Mayor
| Candidate | Popular vote | | | Expenditures |
| Candidate | Votes | % | ±% | Expenditures |
|---|---|---|---|---|
| Mark Sutcliffe | 161,679 | 51.37 | – | $537,834.79 |
| Catherine McKenney | 119,241 | 37.88 | – | $542,847.97 |
| Bob Chiarelli | 15,998 | 5.08 | – | $96,844.84 |
| Nour Kadri | 7,496 | 2.38 | – | $71,062.45 |
| Mike Maguire | 2,775 | 0.88 | – | $5,500.00 |
| Graham MacDonald | 1,629 | 0.52 | – | $5,334.50 |
| Brandon Bay | 1,512 | 0.48 | – | $9,478.02 |
| Param Singh | 1,176 | 0.37 | – | $13,650.40 |
| Celine Debassige | 867 | 0.28 | – | none listed |
| Ade Olumide | 636 | 0.20 | – | $1,966.25 |
| Gregory Jreg Guevara | 584 | 0.19 | – | $2,349.61 |
| Bernard Couchman | 471 | 0.15 | -0.21 | none listed |
| Jacob Solomon | 432 | 0.14 | – | none listed |
| Zed Chebib | 264 | 0.08 | – | none listed |
| Total valid votes | 314,760 | 99.53 | | |
| Total rejected, unmarked and declined votes | 1,500 | 0.47 | -0.92 | |
| Turnout | 316,260 | 43.79 | +1.24 | |
| Eligible voters | 722,227 | | | |
Note: Candidate campaign colours are based on the prominent colour used in campaign items (signs, literature, etc.) and are used as a visual differentiation between candidates.
Sources: City of Ottawa

=== 2018 Ottawa municipal election ===
Somerset Ward (Ward 14)
| Candidate | Votes | % |
|---|---|---|
| Catherine McKenney | 7,754 | 76.66% |
| Jerry Kovacs | 1,461 | 14.44% |
| Arthur David | 701 | 6.93% |
| Merdod Zopyrus | 199 | 1.97% |

=== 2014 Ottawa municipal election ===
Somerset Ward (Ward 14)
| Candidate | Votes | % |
|---|---|---|
| Catherine McKenney | 3,997 | 40.13% |
| Jeff Morrison | 1,681 | 16.88% |
| Martin Canning | 1,631 | 16.38% |
| Conor Meade | 807 | 8.10% |
| Edward Conway | 576 | 5.78% |
| Thomas McVeigh | 434 | 4.36% |
| Lili V. Weemen | 292 | 3.94% |
| Denis Schryburt | 223 | 2.24% |
| Sandro Provenzano | 99 | 0.99% |
| Curtis Tom | 77 | 0.77% |
| Silviu Riley | 43 | 0.43% |
