= Ariel Troster =

Canadian politician

Ottawa City Councillor for Somerset Ward
- Incumbent
- Assumed office November 15, 2022
- Preceded by: Catherine McKenney

Personal details
- Born: 1978 or 1979 (age 47–48) Toronto
- Spouse: Caitlyn Pascal
- Children: 1
- Education: University of Ottawa; Concordia University (B.J.)

Ariel Troster (born 1979) is a politician in Ottawa, Ontario, Canada. She has served as the city councillor for Somerset Ward on the Ottawa City Council since 2022.

== Background ==
Troster was born in Toronto, the daughter of former Toronto Star finance writer Sheryl Smolkin and Joel Troster. She has a bachelor's degree in journalism and history from Concordia University and a master's degree in women's studies from the University of Ottawa.

Prior to being elected, Troster worked for the Federation of Canadian Municipalities, Public Service Alliance of Canada, and The Council of Canadians. She was a writer and columnist for Xtra Magazine from 2005 to 2009 and sat on the board of various LGBTQ organizations including Egale Canada, the Ten Oaks Project and the Ottawa Dyke March. She is Jewish.

== Political career ==
Troster was elected in the 2022 Ottawa municipal election. She was endorsed by outgoing councillor and mayoral candidate Catherine McKenney. Troster received the majority of the vote, with her support being strongest in the neighbourhood of Centretown. She is the second consecutive LGBT councillor to represent Somerset Ward.

Throughout her campaign and subsequent term on city council, Troster has placed emphasis on homelessness, community safety, and expanding pedestrian infrastructure.

In 2023/2024, she opposed the proposal for the City of Ottawa to spend over $400 million to subsidize the redevelopment of Lansdowne Park. Ultimately, city council voted 16-9 in favour of the project, with mayor Mark Sutcliffe voting yes. She also opposed cuts to O-Train frequency that were passed by city council in 2024. Troster has also advocated for the city to adopt bylaws to protect tenants from renovictions; as of 2025, her proposal is being studied by city staff.

== Personal life ==
Troster is married to Caitlyn Pascal. They have one daughter.

== Electoral record ==
2022 Ottawa municipal election: Somerset Ward
Candidate	Popular vote			Expenditures
Candidate	Votes	%	±%	Expenditures
Ariel Troster	8,669	61.28	–	$30,781.77
Stuart MacKay	4,706	33.29	–	$12,259.65
Brandon Russell	768	5.43	–	N/A
Total valid votes	14,137	95.31		
Total rejected, unmarked and declined votes	695	4.69		
Turnout	14,832	45.24	+6.14	
Eligible voters	32,787			
Note: Candidate campaign colours are based on the prominent colour used in campaign items (signs, literature, etc.) and are used as a visual differentiation between candidates.
Sources: "2022 Election Results". City of Ottawa.
