= Somerset Ward =

Somerset
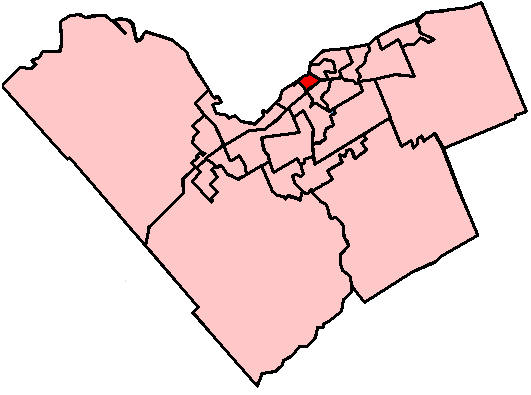
- Location within Ottawa
- Coordinates: 45°25′N 75°42′W
- Country: Canada
- Province: Ontario
- City: Ottawa

Government
  - Councillor: Ariel Troster

Area
  - Total: 5.8 km^{2} (2.2 sq mi)

Population (2011)Canada 2011 Census
  - Total: 35,110
  - Density: 6,100/km^{2} (16,000/sq mi)

Languages (2016)
  - English: 66.6%
  - French: 13.0%
  - Cantonese: 2.1%
  - Arabic: 1.9%
  - Mandarin: 1.8%
  - Spanish: 1.6%
  - Vietnamese: 1.3%
  - Persian: 1.0%
- Avg. income: 38,202

Somerset (Ward 14) is a city ward in the city of Ottawa, Ontario, Canada. It covers the neighbourhoods of Downtown Ottawa, Centretown, Lebreton Flats and most of Centretown West. It is Ottawa's smallest and most dense ward. It is represented on Ottawa City Council by Ariel Troster. It has an area of 6.5 km^{2} and a projected 2006 population of 38,500. According to the 2001 Canadian census, it had a population of 36,365. The ward was created in 1994 when Dalhousie Ward and Wellington Ward were merged. At the time it was known as just Ward 6 until 1995 when it was given the Somerset name.

== City councillors ==
1. Elisabeth Arnold (1994-2003)
2. Diane Holmes (2003-2014)
3. Catherine McKenney (2014–2022)
4. Ariel Troster (2022–present)

== Population data ==
Languages (mother tongue):

- English: 60.2%
- French: 9.9%
- Chinese: 7.9% (inc. Mandarin, Cantonese and Chinese)
- Vietnamese: 1.9%
- Arabic: 1.8%
- Italian: 1.7%
- Spanish: 1.6%

Religion:

- Roman Catholic: 36.0%
- No religion: 27.3%
- Anglican: 6.7%
- United Church: 5.2%
- Muslim: 4.7%
- Buddhist: 3.5%
- Presbyterian: 1.3%
- Baptist: 1.3%
- Jewish: 1.0%
- Greek Orthodox: 1.0%

Income:

- Average household income: $51,319
- Average income: $36,042

== Election results ==
=== 1994 elections ===
Arnold defeated Harris in a rematch of the 1991 election in Dalhousie Ward for city council.

City council
Candidate	Votes	%
Elisabeth Arnold	4,529	50.48
Peter Harris	4,443	49.52

Regional council
Candidate	Votes	%
Diane Holmes	6,496	76.07
Dale Curwin	1,080	12.64
Ross Taylor	742	8.69
Bill Overall	222	2.60

=== 1997 elections ===
City council
Candidate	Votes	%
Elisabeth Arnold	4,004	78.16
Kris Schimmel	1,119	21.84

Regional Council
Candidate	Votes	%
Diane Holmes	Acclaimed	

=== 2000 Ottawa municipal election ===
City council
Candidate	Votes	%
Elisabeth Arnold	6,517	75.77
Olivia Bradley	2,084	24.2

=== 2003 Ottawa municipal election ===
City council
Candidate	Votes	%
Diane Holmes	4105	61.62%
Dawn Pickering	1195	17.94%
David MacDonald	567	8.51%
William A. Ostapyk	366	5.49%
Steve Sweeney	189	2.84%
Sotos Petrides	132	1.98%
Bill Driver	55	0.83%
Mike Jung	53	0.80%

=== 2006 Ottawa municipal election ===
City council
Candidate	Votes	%
Diane Holmes	6600	63.07%
Luc Lapointe	1782	17.03%
George Guirguis	1497	14.31%
Karen Dawe	359	3.43%
Idris Ben-Tahir	226	2.16%

=== 2010 Ottawa municipal election ===
Diane Holmes is running for re-election against Don Fex, a former festival production manager and manager of a local book store, Susan Miller, a former elected School Commissioner for the Western Quebec School Board 2007, and Barkley Pollock, an unsuccessful mayoral candidate from 2006 election, and past supporter of Liberal candidate Richard Mahoney.

City council
Candidate	Votes	%
Diane Holmes	6282	66.51
Don Fex	2024	21.43
Susan Miller	810	8.58
Barkley Pollock	329	3.48

=== 2014 Ottawa municipal election ===
City council
Candidate	Votes	%
Catherine McKenney	3,997	40.13
Jeff Morrison	1,681	16.88
Martin Canning	1,631	16.38
Conor Meade	807	8.10
Edward Conway	576	5.78
Thomas McVeigh	434	4.36
Lili V. Weemen	292	3.94
Denis Schryburt	223	2.24
Sandro Provenzano	99	0.99
Curtis Tom	77	0.77
Silviu Riley	43	0.43

=== 2018 Ottawa municipal election ===
Council candidate	Vote	%
Catherine McKenney	7,754	76.66
Jerry Kovacs	1,461	14.44
Arthur David	701	6.93
Merdod Zopyrus	199	1.97

=== 2022 Ottawa municipal election ===
Council candidate	Vote	%
Ariel Troster	8,669	61.28
Stuart MacKay	4,706	33.29
Brandon Russell	768	5.43

=== 2026 Ottawa municipal election ===
2026 Ottawa municipal election: Somerset
Candidate	Popular vote			Expenditures
Candidate	Votes	%	±%	Expenditures
Ariel Troster (X)	9,061	61.89		
Robert Dekker	2,818	19.25		
Michael Tay	2,019	13.79		
Nicholas Gollé	430	2.94		
Dillon Anderson	313	2.14		
Total valid votes	15,162			
Total rejected, unmarked and declined votes				
Turnout		38.57		
Eligible voters	39,309			
Note: Candidate campaign colours are based on the prominent colour used in campaign items (signs, literature, etc.) and are used as a visual differentiation between candidates.
