= Canadian Injured Workers Alliance =

- Abbreviation: CIWA
- Founded: August 1, 1990; 36 years ago
- Purpose: Workers' compensation, Occupational rehabilitation
- Location: 1202 Jasper Drive, Thunder Bay, Ontario, MP7B 6R2, Canada
- Region served: Canada
- Key people: Leonard J. Crawford, President; Bill Chedore, National Coordinator Steve Mantis, co-founder Wolfgang Zimmermann, co-founder
- Website: www.ciwa.ca

The Canadian Injured Workers Alliance (CIWA) is a Canadian charity and advocacy organization for injured workers and occupational rehabilitation. Active in providing training, educational resources, and advocacy both federally and provincially, it is based on a national network of injured workers groups whose aim is to support injured workers and improve the occupational health and safety of workers across Canada. CIWA's stated objectives include:

- improving the occupational health and safety of workers in Canada.
- working towards a just system of compensation, rehabilitation and re-employment in all provinces and territories of Canada.
- providing a national forum for debating issues of concern to injured workers and their organizations at national conferences and at national board workshops.
- gathering and share information with groups and individuals across Canada.

The organization was founded in 1990 by Steve Mantis and other injured workers advocates including Wolfgang Zimmermann, after they organized a "National Conference on Re-Employment of Injured Workers" in Ottawa in June 1990. The conference passed a resolution to form a national organization representing a national network of injured worker organizations, ultimately to become CIWA.

== See also ==
- Workers' compensation
- Occupational rehabilitation
