= Christmas Island Women's Association =

Human rights organisation in Christmas Island

- Formation: 1989
- Legal status: Non-governmental organisation
- President: Nora Koh

The Christmas Island Women's Association (CIWA) is a human rights organisation in Christmas Island. Established in 1989, it advocates for women's rights to the Australian government and runs community-based activities for women and children.

== Background ==
The Christmas Island Women's Association was established in 1989 by nurse Nora Koh, in order to promote and support the interests of women in the territory. It is affiliated with Associated Country Women of the World. Members of the association are of Chinese, Malay, and European Australian descent.

== Activities ==
In 1989 the CIWA founded the Women's Refuge Centre, in 1990 the Childcare Centre, and in 1991 an early childhood programme. In 1992 the CIWA founded a music school and have sponsored musicians to work with young people.

The CIWA has expressed concern that access services on Christmas Island are not equal to those on mainland Australia, and have particularly cited the fact that although research is commissioned it is not disseminated to communities. They have also supported calls for the role of Administrator on Christmas Island (a role appointed by the Australian government) to be abolished and the Administrator's duties to be merged with those of the locally elected Shire President.

The CIWA has lobbied the Australian government which administers the island for improvement in a number of health related issues including: disability care and support for carers, asbestos removal, anti-smoking support, and the installation of a mammogram machine on the island in 2006. They have also been outspoken against the lack of residential care for older people on the island. The association has worked with Keep Australia Beautiful, running workshops on waste reduction.

== Notable people ==
- Nora Koh - President (1989 - ?).
- Regine Andersen - Secretary.
