= California Immigrant Workers Association =

AFL–CIO associate membership organization

The California Immigrant Workers Association (CIWA) was an AFL–CIO associate membership organization from 1989 to 1994. Initiated by AFL–CIO regional director David Sicker with support from labor unions in California, CIWA helped undocumented immigrants to regularized their immigration status under the Immigration Reform and Control Act of 1986, and supported organizing campaigns among immigrant workers into the labor movement.

== History ==
The California Immigrant Workers Association was a program by the AFL–CIO in Los Angeles, California intended to help immigrant workers to obtain amnesty through the Immigration Reform and Control Act of 1986 (IRCA). AFL–CIO regional director David Sickler launched the organization in 1989 with funding from the AFL–CIO and twenty-one unions affiliated to the AFL–CIO and six central labor councils. Jose de Paz served as the Executive Director. The program offered "associate membership" in the AFL–CIO to workers who were not directly members of unions. CIWA followed an earlier program known as the Labor Immigrant Assistance Program (LIAP) that offered legal assistance, English language, and citizenship courses for undocumented immigrants regularizing their status under the 1986 immigration reform law. CIWA staff included veteran union organizers who spoke Spanish, understood immigrant cultures, and were familiar with U.S. labor law and practice. The organization assisted with several high-profile strikes including among auto parts workers at American Racing Equipment in August 1990 and Orange County construction workers in 1992. In 1994, the AFL–CIO withdrew funding from CIWA and the organization disbanded. The AFL-CIO helped integrate immigrants into the labor movement, even though it had its setbacks, by promoting construction work as an accessible job to obtain. In 1994, the AFL–CIO withdrew funding from CIWA and the organization disbanded. The CIWA operates with 21 unions that are associated with AFL-CIO as well as cix central labor councils. TentIn conjunction with the AFL-CIO the CIWA has members in departments ranging from metal trades to maritime trades, which offer a multitude of unions to band together.

== Latino immigrant workers prior to 1986 ==
Prior to World War I, the AFL often ignored Latinos and focused its attention into more organized groups such as Asian workers and Latino workers did not get sufficient support from the AFL. In fact, the AFL and its leader Samuel Gompers supported immigration restrictions in the basis of economic takeover. According to him, Latinos, especially Mexicans would take the jobs of the white workers and therefore would lower the wages.

It was not until restrictions on immigration for Mexicans by the Exclusion Law of 1921 (which may be the same as the Emergency Quota Act passed in 1921) and the Quota Act of 1924 were exempted, that the AFL made arrangements to allow Mexican workers to join American Labor Unions.

However, immigrant workers in California still faced discrimination by the AFL, which lobbied to give jobs to white workers over Latino workers, especially during the Great Depression up until the ratification of the Civil Rights Act of 1964 which prohibited union discrimination. Nevertheless, even though the AFL opposed immigration it favored amnesty because it believed that legal workers were less likely to be exploited than illegal workers and therefore wages would not drop.

== Goals and contributions ==
The California Immigrant Workers Association became important for the California immigrant workers because it was an attempt to organize those promoting labor rights. It was designed to improve the lives of its members with attorney consultation about issues at the work place, immigration, education, housing, as well as with the opportunity of obtaining knowledge using computers at learning centers.

The program thus offered immigrant workers access to health care, provided legal services, and protected union rights that would have not been accessible to Latino immigrant workers without the California Immigrant Workers Association. The association's creation promoted a closer connection between Latino immigrant workers and the AFL–CIO and it became a bridge between Latinos and the labor movement. It was also key organization to win unionization in important strikes such as the wildcat strike in 1991 and the Drywall strike in 1992.
