= Northern Ontario Party =

Provincial political party in Canada

Northern Ontario Party Parti de l'Ontario Nord
- Active provincial party
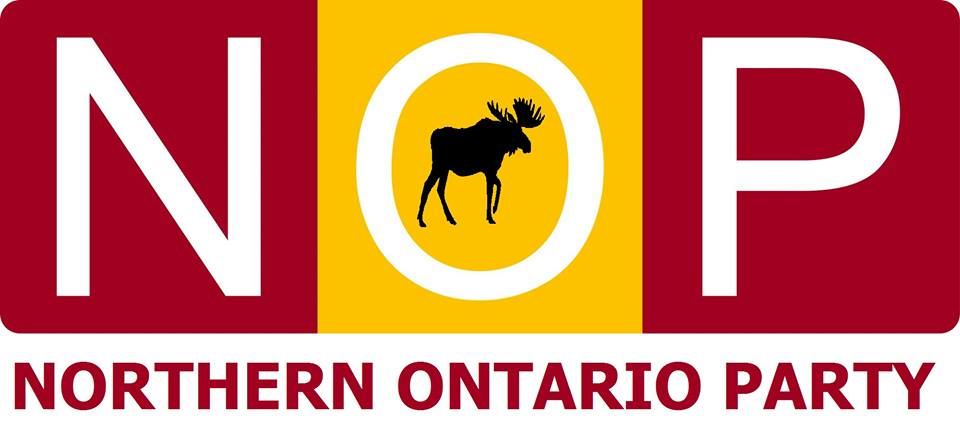
- Leader: Jacques Ouellette
- President: Kenneth Jones
- Founder: Ed Deibel
- Founded: 1977, and again in 2010
- Headquarters: 1669 Wartman Lake Rd Fowler ON P7G 0Y1
- Membership (2018): 300
- Ideology: Regionalism; Populism
- Colours: Cardinal & Gold
- Seats in Legislature: 0 / 124

Website
- northernontarioparty.org

The Northern Ontario Party (NOP), called the Northern Ontario Heritage Party (NOHP) until 2016, is a provincial political party in Ontario, Canada. It was formed in 1977 to campaign for provincial status for Northern Ontario. No member has ever been elected to the Legislative Assembly of Ontario.

The party's founder, Ed Deibel of North Bay, travelled Northern Ontario in the late 1960s and early 1970s to promote the idea of creating a separate province, and to sign up supporters for the party. Prior to launching the party, Deibel had been a business owner and a member of the North Bay City Council.

The party later dropped the idea of a separate province from its platform. It continued to promote Northern Ontario's interests within Ontario.

The party disbanded in 1985; it remained inactive until being revived and re-registered by Elections Ontario in 2010. In its initial form, the party did not advocate separation; instead, it campaigned for changes to the region's status and political power within the province. The idea of full separation was restored to the party's platform in 2016, but dropped again in 2018.

== Origins of the party ==
The NOHP had its roots in the April 1973 provincial budget, in which the Government of Ontario proposed to extend the seven per cent provincial sales tax to heating and electricity. Deibel notified the local media that he would go to jail before paying the tax. This led to a meeting of about 500 people, and the formation of a tax repeal committee chaired by Deibel. The committee collected 24,000 signatures from all over Northern Ontario on a petition; the government ultimately withdrew the proposal.

On May 16, 1973, Deibel formed a committee to discuss this idea, and began research about Northern Ontario's problems. Deibel travelled Northern Ontario recruiting 600 members for the new province committee, and obtaining 6,000 signatures on a petition requesting that a vote be given to Northern Ontario on the question of forming a new province.

In October 1974, Deibel pitched a tent at Queen's Park, site of Ontario's legislative assembly, for three days, and gave interviews to the media. This led to a half-hour private meeting with Premier William Davis, who refused to allow a plebiscite.

In the spring of 1975, Deibel wrote to Premier Davis, offering to abandon the new province committee if the government met seven demands:

1. Establish a Northern Ontario Development Commission with citizens from Northern Ontario.
2. A program paid for by the province to eliminate municipal taxes for ten years for all new manufacturing plants that complete at least 80 per cent of finished form.
3. Non-renewable resources to have a depletion tax deposited in a trust fund designed for that area when the project in finished.
4. At least 50 per cent of all natural resources to be processed and manufactured in Northern Ontario.
5. A billion-dollar catch-up program to provide serviced land for housing industrial parks and social needs.
6. Appointment of a provincial cabinet minister with full responsibility for mining.
7. Lakehead University and Laurentian University would receive funding for a continuing program of research and development that assures a better quality of life in Northern Ontario.

The Ontario government responded to the offer, noting that "Northern Ontario... is strengthened by being an integral part of a very broadly based provincial economy." The government's response addressed each of the demands, but accepted none of them.

Deibel replied with a demand for the Premier's resignation. On September 17, 1976, he began to collect the 10,000 signatures necessary to register a new political party. The provincial government subsequently created the Ministry of Northern Development and Mines in 1977. The Northern Ontario Heritage Party was given official certification in October 1977, with 10,600 signatures.

== Activity ==
In 1979, Deibel created some controversy when he claimed that Ontario Progressive Conservative Party cabinet minister Alan Pope had pledged to cross the floor and join the party as its first MPP. Pope denied the claim and never crossed; according to Pope, while he lauded the party's goal of improving Northern Ontario's economic standing, he felt that he could accomplish more by working within the government than by sitting with a minor party.

Soon afterward, Deibel attempted to run for a nomination as a Progressive Conservative Party of Canada candidate in the 1980 federal election. Perceived as having damaged his and the party's credibility, he was forced to resign his position and was succeeded as leader by Garry Lewis, a businessman from Callander who dropped separation from the party's agenda and instead campaigned for economic development of the region within the province.

Despite the more than 10,000 people who had signed the party's original certification documents, the party had no more than 200 paying members at its peak.

In early 1983, the party membership ousted Lewis and its executive. The party's new leader, Ronald Gilson, promptly reinstated separation from Ontario as the party's primary goal. By 1985, however, the party was deregistered after failing to file its annual contributions and expenses return for 1984; Don Joynt, the executive director of the provincial Commission on Election Contributions and Expenses, revealed that in its year-end return for 1983, the party had listed just ninety cents in assets and only four card-carrying members.

== 2010 revival ==
In 2010, Deibel began trying to revive the party, setting up a website where Northerners were invited to join the party. On August 6, 2010, the party was registered by Elections Ontario.

In its initial platform, the revived Northern Ontario Heritage Party called for a number of measures to increase the region's power over its own affairs within the province, including increasing the number of Northern Ontario electoral districts in the Legislative Assembly of Ontario and the creation of a special district for the region's First Nations voters.

The party ran three candidates in the 2011 provincial election, garnering 683 votes. However, one of its candidates ran in the downtown Toronto riding of St. Paul's rather than in a Northern Ontario riding.

In the 2014 provincial election, the party received 892 votes with three candidates. Deibel ran as the party's candidate in Thunder Bay—Atikokan.

In 2016, the party changed its name to "Northern Ontario Party", by registering the name change with Elections Ontario as per regulations, and announced Trevor Holliday as its new leader. Holliday, previously a bus driver for Ontario Northland, was converted to Northern Ontario separation when the government of Dalton McGuinty announced plans in 2012 to shut down the service, and attracted media attention early in 2016 when he created an online petition on change.org which eventually attracted over 4,000 signatories. Deibel remained involved in the party executive. Under Holliday's leadership, the party restored separation from Ontario to its platform.

In 2017, the party called for the creation of a separate Ministry of Natural Resources and Forestry for Northern Ontario as an interim step during the period of secession negotiations, as well as calling for a referendum to revise the province's school board structure.

In the 2018 Ontario general election, the party again dropped separation from Ontario from its campaign platform, and returned to advocating for measures to improve the region's standing within the province, such as the creation of special Northern Ontario-only government ministries.

In April 2019, Trevor Holliday resigned as leader of the Northern Ontario Party, in order "to ensure we have a leader that can communicate with the supporters, members, media and most importantly Northerners, in more than just English." He was succeeded as leader by Shawn Poirier, a truck driver from Kirkland Lake who had been the party's candidate in Timiskaming—Cochrane in 2018. Poirier stepped down as leader a few months later, citing personal reasons, and Holliday reassumed the leadership on an interim basis.

In 2021, Holliday backed the idea of a Northern Ontario travel bubble during the COVID-19 pandemic in Canada, allowing free movement within Northern Ontario but restricting entry from outside the region. The party failed to win any seats in the 2022 Ontario general election.

== Party leaders ==
Northern Ontario Party
Name	Term start	Term end	Riding(s) contested as Leader	Notes
Ed Deibel	1977	1981	None	First Leader of the Northern Ontario Heritage Party
Garry Lewis	1981	1983	None	
Ronald Gilson	1983	1985	None	Party deregistered in 1985 for failing to file its annual contributions and expenses return for 1984
Ed Deibel	2010	2016	Thunder Bay-Atikokan (2014) – Loss	
Trevor Holliday	2016	2019	Nipissing (2018) – Loss	Party renamed Northern Ontario Party
Shawn Poirier	2019	2019	None	Interim Party Leader
Trevor Holliday	2019	2023	None	
Jacques Ouellette	2023	present	None	

== Election results ==
Election results
Election year	Party leader	Votes	% (Northern Ontario)	% (Overall)	No. of candidates	Seats	+/−	Legislative role
2011	Ed Deibel	676	0.22	0.02	3	0 / 107	New Party	Extra-parliamentary
2014	Ed Deibel	892	0.27	0.02	3	0 / 107	Steady	Extra-parliamentary
2018	Trevor Holliday	5,912	1.65	0.10	10	0 / 124	Steady	Extra-parliamentary
2022	Trevor Holliday	283		0.01	2	0 / 124	Steady	Extra-parliamentary
2025	Jacques Ouellette	656		0.01	3	0 / 124	Steady	Extra-parliamentary

== See also ==
- List of Canadian political parties
- Proposals for new Canadian provinces and territories
