= Canadian federal election results in Northern Ontario =

Seats obtained by party (since 1949)

Liberal
Conservative
New Democratic
Progressive Conservative (defunct)
Co-operative Commonwealth (defunct)

Electoral history
Year	Results
1945	
1940	
1935	
1926	

This page shows results of Canadian federal elections in Northern Ontario.

== Regional profile ==
Northern Ontario has traditionally been one of the more left-leaning areas of Ontario, with strong support for reformist and social democratic policies. This region has traditionally been a two-way split between the Liberals and New Democratic Party (NDP). However, the Liberals held every seat here during their Ontario sweeps from 1993 to 2000. The NDP regained two seats in 2004 and produced very strong results in many other ridings. They were unable to pick up any more in 2006, but came close in almost every riding, and they swept much of the region in 2008.

The Conservatives are traditionally weak in this region, except in the Parry Sound—Muskoka riding bordering Central Ontario, which they were able to pick up in the 2006 election in a very close race. The Conservatives also have some strength in Kenora, which has often seen close three-way races between all three major parties and was won by the Conservatives in 2008. This changed in 2011, when the meltdown of Liberal support allowed the Conservatives to pick up an additional two seats, leaving the Liberals completely shut out of northern Ontario for the first time in decades.

In 2015, however, the Liberals took seven ridings, many of which they had lost in 2008. The NDP held onto two ridings, while Parry Sound-Muskoka remained with the Conservatives.

In 2019, the Conservatives overtook the NDP for second place in terms of vote share in the region, and they took the riding of Kenora.

In 2021, the Conservatives overtook the Liberals for first place in terms of vote share in the region, but no seats changed parties.

Due to the 2022 Canadian federal electoral redistribution Northern Ontario fell from 10 to 9 Seats, with the NDP held riding of Algoma—Manitoulin—Kapuskasing being abolished and merged with neighbouring ridings.

In 2025, the NDP were shut out of Northern Ontario for the first time since the 2000 election, with the Conservatives taking the riding of Kapuskasing—Timmins—Mushkegowuk from the NDP, and the riding of Sudbury East—Manitoulin—Nickel Belt from the Liberals.

=== Votes by party throughout time ===
Election	Liberal	Conservative	New Democratic	Green	People's	PC	Reform / Alliance	Others
1979	166,292; 40.4%	—	133,687; 32.5%	—	—	108,925; 26.5%	—	1,567; 0.4%
1980	189,730; 46.9%	—	138,373; 34.2%	—	—	74,776; 18.5%	—	1,057; 0.3%
1984	139,642; 32.2%	—	126,234; 29.1%	—	—	166,122; 38.3%	—	1,283; 0.3%
1988	158,146; 36.5%	—	136,328; 31.4%	—	—	127,363; 29.4%	—	1,824; 0.4%
1993	259,203; 59.1%	—	54,397; 12.4%	—	—	48,800; 11.1%	68,955; 15.7%	6,783; 1.5%
1997	192,456; 48.5%	—	82,298; 20.7%	513; 0.1%	—	47,648; 12.0%	71,872; 18.1%	1,851; 0.5%
2000	186,988; 51.4%	—	60,343; 16.6%	5,409; 1.5%	—	30,527; 8.4%	79,618; 21.9%	343; 0.1%
2004	155,063; 41.1%	95,902; 25.4%	109,575; 29.0%	14,281; 3.8%	—	—	—	906; 0.2%
2006	160,408; 38.7%	103,814; 25.0%	131,663; 31.8%	14,450; 3.5%	—	—	—	396; 0.1%
2008	106,626; 28.9%	109,533; 29.7%	128,120; 34.8%	22,403; 6.1%	—	—	—	868; 0.2%
2011	73,799; 18.9%	139,146; 35.6%	162,474; 41.6%	14,364; 3.7%	—	—	—	693; 0.2%
2015	185,992; 42.4%	111,667; 25.5%	120,743; 27.5%	19,157; 4.4%	—	—	—	1,080; 0.2%
2019	151,597; 35.2%	122,495; 28.5%	115,962; 27.0%	29,641; 6.9%	9,267; 2.2%	—	—	892; 0.2%
2021	132,008; 31.4%	135,947; 32.4%	112,993; 26.9%	7,283; 1.7%	30,982; 7.4%	—	—	680; 0.2%
2025	213,571; 42.0%	211,122; 41.5%	75,868; 14.9%	2,584; 0.5%	4,864; 1.0%	—	—	750; 0.1%

Liberal Conservative New Democratic Green People's	Progressive Conservative (defunct) Alliance (defunct) Reform (defunct)

== 2025 ==
Electoral district	Candidates						Incumbent
Electoral district	Liberal	Conservative	NDP	Green	PPC	Other	Incumbent
Kapuskasing—Timmins—Mushkegowuk	Steve Black; 18,366; 39.0%	Gaétan Malette; 23,062; 48.9%	Nicole Fortier Levesque; 4,895; 10.4%		Serge Lefebvre; 814; 1.7%		Charlie Angus†; Timmins—James Bay
Kenora—Kiiwetinoong	Charles Fox; 9,454; 35.2%	Eric Melillo; 13,109; 48.7%	Tania Cameron; 3,698; 13.8%	Jon Hobbs; 286; 1.1%	Bryce Desjarlais; 204; 0.8%	Kelvin Boucher-Chicago (Ind.); 141; 0.5%	Eric Melillo; Kenora
Nipissing—Timiskaming	Pauline Rochefort; 27,674; 47.2%	Garry Keller; 26,121; 44.6%	Valerie Kennedy; 3,548; 6.1%	Louise Poitras; 585; 1.0%	John Janssen; 648; 1.1%		Anthony Rota†
Parry Sound—Muskoka	Geordie Sabbagh; 27,563; 42.6%	Scott Aitchison; 33,742; 52.2%	Heather Hay; 2,300; 3.6%		Isabel Pereira; 1,048; 1.6%		Scott Aitchison
Sault Ste. Marie—Algoma	Terry Sheehan; 30,936; 47.4%	Hugh Stevenson; 29,208; 44.7%	Laura Mayer; 4,327; 6.6%	Robyn Kiki Eshkibok; 541; 0.8%		James Collins (CHP); 305; 0.5%	Terry Sheehan; Sault Ste. Marie
Sault Ste. Marie—Algoma	Terry Sheehan; 30,936; 47.4%	Hugh Stevenson; 29,208; 44.7%	Laura Mayer; 4,327; 6.6%	Robyn Kiki Eshkibok; 541; 0.8%		James Collins (CHP); 305; 0.5%	Merged District
Sault Ste. Marie—Algoma	Terry Sheehan; 30,936; 47.4%	Hugh Stevenson; 29,208; 44.7%	Laura Mayer; 4,327; 6.6%	Robyn Kiki Eshkibok; 541; 0.8%		James Collins (CHP); 305; 0.5%	Carol Hughes†; Algoma—Manitoulin—Kapuskasing
Sudbury	Viviane Lapointe; 31,551; 51.9%	Ian Symington; 23,835; 39.2%	Nadia Verrelli; 4,680; 7.7%		Nicholas Bonderoff; 773; 1.3%		Viviane Lapointe
Sudbury East—Manitoulin—Nickel Belt	Marc G. Serré; 25,075; 41.6%	Jim Belanger; 29,156; 48.3%	Andréane Chénier; 4,822; 8.0%	Himal Hossain; 465; 0.8%	Sharilynne St. Louis; 489; 0.8%	Justin Dean Newell Leroux (Libert.); 316; 0.5%	Marc Serré; Nickel Belt
Thunder Bay—Rainy River	Marcus Powlowski; 21,125; 48.5%	Brendan Hyatt; 18,685; 42.9%	Yuk-Sem Won; 2,954; 6.8%	Eric Arner; 334; 0.8%	Sabrina Ree; 433; 1.0%		Marcus Powlowski
Thunder Bay—Superior North	Patty Hajdu; 25,134; 55.2%	Bob Herman; 16,267; 35.7%	Joy Wakefield; 3,235; 7.1%	John Malcolm Northey; 417; 0.9%	Amos Bradley; 459; 1.0%		Patty Hajdu

== 2021 ==
Electoral district	Candidates						Incumbent
Electoral district	Liberal	Conservative	NDP	Green	PPC	Other	Incumbent
Algoma—Manitoulin—Kapuskasing	Duke Peltier; 8,888; 22.49%	John Sagman; 10,885; 27.54%	Carol Hughes; 15,895; 40.22%	Stephen Zimmermann; 726; 1.84%	Harry Jaaskelainen; 2,840; 7.19%	Clarence Baarda (CHP); 289; 0.73%	Carol Hughes
Kenora	David Bruno; 5,190; 19.90%	Eric Melillo; 11,103; 42.57%	Janine Seymour; 7,801; 29.91%	Remi Rheault; 364; 1.40%	Craig Martin; 1,625; 6.23%		Eric Melillo
Nickel Belt	Marc G Serré; 17,353; 35.18%	Charles Humphrey; 13,425; 27.22%	Andréane Simone Chénier; 13,137; 26.64%	Craig Gravelle; 848; 1.72%	David Hobbs; 4,558; 9.24%		Marc Serré
Nipissing—Timiskaming	Anthony Rota; 18,405; 38.75%	Steven Trahan; 15,104; 31.80%	Scott Robertson; 10,493; 22.09%		Gregory J Galante; 3,494; 7.36%		Anthony Rota
Parry Sound-Muskoka	Jovanie Nicoyishakiye; 12,014; 21.65%	Scott Aitchison; 26,600; 47.93%	Heather Hay; 9,339; 16.83%	Marc Mantha; 3,099; 5.58%	James Tole; 4,184; 7.54%	James Fawcett (NCA); 95 0.17%	Scott Aitchison
Parry Sound-Muskoka	Jovanie Nicoyishakiye; 12,014; 21.65%	Scott Aitchison; 26,600; 47.93%	Heather Hay; 9,339; 16.83%	Marc Mantha; 3,099; 5.58%	James Tole; 4,184; 7.54%	Daniel Predie Jr (Ind.); 169 0.30%	Scott Aitchison
Sault Ste. Marie	Terry Sheehan; 15,231; 37.91%	Sonny Spina; 14,984; 37.29%	Marie Morin-Strom; 8,041; 20.01%		Kasper Makowski; 1,923; 4.79%		Terry Sheehan
Sudbury	Viviane LaPointe; 15,871; 34.52%	Ian Symington; 12,747; 27.73%	Nadia Verrelli; 13,569; 29.52%	David Robert Robinson; 940; 2.04%	Colette Andréa Methé; 2,735; 5.95%	J. David Popescu (Ind.); 111; 0.24%	Paul Lefebvre†
Thunder Bay—Rainy River	Marcus Powlowski; 13,655; 34.26%	Adelina Pecchia; 11,671; 29.28%	Yuk-Sem Won; 11,342; 28.45%	Tracey MacKinnon; 571; 1.43%	Alan Aubut; 2,621; 6.58%		Marcus Powlowski
Thunder Bay—Superior North	Patty Hajdu; 16,893; 40.72%	Joshua Taylor; 10,035; 24.19%	Chantelle Bryson; 11,244; 27.11%	Amanda Moddejonge; 735; 1.77%	Rick Daines; 2,465; 5.94%	Alexander Vodden (Libert.); 111; 0.27%	Patty Hajdu
Timmins-James Bay	Steve Black; 8,508; 24.61%	Morgan Ellerton; 9,393; 27.17%	Charlie Angus; 12,132; 35.09%		Stephen MacLeod; 4,537; 13.12%		Charlie Angus

== 2019 ==
Electoral district	Candidates						Incumbent
Electoral district	Liberal	Conservative	NDP	Green	PPC	Other	Incumbent
Algoma—Manitoulin—Kapuskasing	Heather Wilson; 9,879; 24.34%	David Williamson; 10,625; 26.18%	Carol Hughes; 16,883; 41.59%	Max Chapman; 2,192; 5.40%	Dave Delisle; 887; 2.19%	Le Marquis De Marmalade (Rhino.); 125; 0.31%	Carol Hughes
Kenora	Bob Nault; 8,335; 30.00%	Eric Melillo; 9,445; 33.99%	Rudy Turtle; 7,923; 28.51%	Kirsi Ralko; 1,526; 5.49%	Michael Di Pasquale; 388; 1.40%	Kelvin Boucher-Chicago (Ind.); 170; 0.61%	Bob Nault
Nickel Belt	Marc G Serré; 19,046; 38.99%	Aino Laamanen; 10,343; 21.17%	Stef Paquette; 15,656; 32.05%	Casey Lalonde; 2,644; 5.41%	Mikko Paavola; 1,159; 2.37%		Marc Serré
Nipissing—Timiskaming	Anthony Rota; 19,352; 40.55%	Jordy Carr; 12,984; 27.20%	Rob Boulet; 9,784; 20.50%	Alex Gomm; 3,111; 6.52%	Mark King; 2,496; 5.23%		Anthony Rota
Parry Sound-Muskoka	Trisha Cowie; 16,615; 30.40%	Scott Aitchison; 22,845; 41.79%	Tom Young; 6,417; 11.74%	Gord Miller; 8,409; 15.38%		Daniel Predie Jr (Ind.); 377; 0.69%	Tony Clement†#
Sault Ste. Marie	Terry Sheehan; 16,284; 39.05%	Sonny Spina; 13,407; 32.15%	Sara McCleary; 9,459; 22.68%	Geo McLean; 1,809; 4.34%	Amy Zuccato; 741; 1.78%		Terry Sheehan
Sudbury	Paul Lefebvre; 19,643; 40.94%	Pierre St-Amant; 9,864; 20.56%	Beth Mairs; 13,885; 28.94%	Bill Crumplin; 3,225; 6.72%	Sean Paterson; 873; 1.82%	Chanel Lalonde (Animal); 282; 0.59% J. David Popescu (Ind.); 70; 0.15% Charlene Sylvestre (Ind.); 135; 0.28%	Paul Lefebvre
Thunder Bay—Rainy River	Marcus Powlowski; 14,498; 35.32%	Linda Rydholm; 12,039; 29.33%	Yuk-Sem Won; 11,944; 29.10%	Amanda Moddejonge; 1,829; 4.46%	Andrew Hartnell; 741; 1.81%		Don Rusnak†$
Thunder Bay—Superior North	Patty Hajdu; 18,502; 42.85%	Frank Pullia; 11,036; 25.56%	Anna Betty Achneepineskum; 9,126; 21.14%	Bruce Hyer; 3,639; 8.43%	Youssef Khanjari; 734; 1.70%	Alexander Vodden (Libert.); 140; 0.32%	Patty Hajdu
Timmins-James Bay	Michelle Boileau; 9,443; 25.70%	Kraymr Grenke; 9,907; 26.97%	Charlie Angus; 14,885; 40.51%	Max Kennedy; 1,257; 3.42%	Renaud Roy; 1,248; 3.40%		Charlie Angus

== 2015 ==
Electoral district	Candidates					Incumbent
Electoral district	Conservative	NDP	Liberal	Green	Other	Incumbent
Algoma—Manitoulin— Kapuskasing	André Robichaud; 9,820; 23.73%	Carol Hughes; 16,516; 39.92%	Heather Wilson; 14,111; 34.11%	Calvin John Orok; 927; 2.24%		Carol Hughes
Kenora	Greg Rickford; 8,751; 28.46%	Howard Hampton; 10,420; 33.88%	Bob Nault; 10,918; 35.50%	Ember C. McKillop; 501; 1.63%	Kelvin Boucher-Chicago (Ind.); 162; 0.53%	Greg Rickford
Nickel Belt	Aino Laamanen; 8,221; 16.74%	Claude Gravelle; 18,556; 37.78%	Marc Serré; 21,021; 42.80%	Stuart McCall; 1,217; 2.48%	Dave Starbuck (M-L); 98; 0.20%	Claude Gravelle
Nipissing—Timiskaming	Jay Aspin; 14,325; 29.31%	Kathleen Jodouin; 7,936; 16.24%	Anthony Rota; 25,357; 51.88%	Nicole Peltier; 1,257; 2.57%		Jay Aspin
Parry Sound-Muskoka	Tony Clement; 22,206; 43.30%	Matt McCarthy; 5,183; 10.11%	Trisha Cowie; 19,937; 38.88%	Glen Hodgson; 3,704; 7.22%	Duncan Bell (Pirate); 121 0.24%	Tony Clement
Parry Sound-Muskoka	Tony Clement; 22,206; 43.30%	Matt McCarthy; 5,183; 10.11%	Trisha Cowie; 19,937; 38.88%	Glen Hodgson; 3,704; 7.22%	Gordie Merton (CAP); 88 0.17%	Tony Clement
Parry Sound-Muskoka	Tony Clement; 22,206; 43.30%	Matt McCarthy; 5,183; 10.11%	Trisha Cowie; 19,937; 38.88%	Glen Hodgson; 3,704; 7.22%	Albert Gray Smith (M-L); 40 0.08%	Tony Clement
Sault Ste. Marie	Bryan Hayes; 13,615; 31.12%	Skip Morrison; 9,543; 21.81%	Terry Sheehan; 19,582; 44.75%	Kara Flannigan; 934; 2.13%	Mike Taffarel (M-L); 83; 0.19%	Bryan Hayes
Sudbury	Fred Slade; 10,473; 21.10%	Paul Loewenberg; 13,793; 27.79%	Paul Lefebvre; 23,534; 47.42%	David Robinson; 1,509; 3.04%	Jean-Raymond Audet (Ind.); 134 0.27%	Vacant
Sudbury	Fred Slade; 10,473; 21.10%	Paul Loewenberg; 13,793; 27.79%	Paul Lefebvre; 23,534; 47.42%	David Robinson; 1,509; 3.04%	J. David Popescu (Ind.); 84 0.17%	Vacant
Sudbury	Fred Slade; 10,473; 21.10%	Paul Loewenberg; 13,793; 27.79%	Paul Lefebvre; 23,534; 47.42%	David Robinson; 1,509; 3.04%	Elizabeth Rowley (Comm.); 102 0.21%	Vacant
Thunder Bay—Rainy River	Moe Comuzzi; 8,876; 21.09%	John Rafferty; 12,483; 29.66%	Don Rusnak; 18,523; 44.02%	Christy Radbourne; 2,201; 5.23%		John Rafferty
Thunder Bay— Superior North	Richard Harvey; 7,775; 17.43%	Andrew Foulds; 10,339; 23.18%	Patty Hajdu; 20,069; 44.99%	Bruce Hyer; 6,155; 13.80%	Robert Skaf (Ind.); 270; 0.61%	Bruce Hyer
Timmins-James Bay	John P. Curley; 7,605; 20.40%	Charlie Angus; 15,974; 42.86%	Todd Lever; 12,940; 34.72%	Max Kennedy; 752; 2.02%		Charlie Angus

== 2011 ==
Electoral district	Candidates					Incumbent
Electoral district	Conservative	Liberal	NDP	Green	Other	Incumbent
Algoma—Manitoulin— Kapuskasing	Ray Sturgeon; 10,991; 30.33%	François Cloutier; 5,374; 14.83%	Carol Hughes; 18,747; 51.73%	Lorraine A. Rekmans; 1,130; 3.12%		Carol Hughes
Kenora	Greg Rickford; 11,567; 47.05%	Roger Valley; 5,381; 21.89%	Tania Cameron; 6,855; 27.88%	Mike Schwindt; 636; 2.59%	Kelvin Chicago-Boucher (Ind.); 147; 0.60%	Greg Rickford
Nickel Belt	Lynne Reynolds; 12,503; 27.98%	Joe Cormier; 6,308; 14.12%	Claude Gravelle; 24,566; 54.97%	Christine Guillot-Proulx; 1,252; 2.80%	Steve Rutchinski (M-L); 59; 0.13%	Claude Gravelle
Nipissing—Timiskaming	Jay Aspin; 15,495; 36.66%	Anthony Rota; 15,477; 36.61%	Rona Eckert; 8,781; 20.77%	Scott Edward Daley; 2,518; 5.96%		Anthony Rota
Parry Sound-Muskoka	Tony Clement; 25,864; 55.73%	Cindy Waters; 5,330; 11.48%	Wendy Wilson; 11,217; 24.17%	Glen Hodgson; 3,776; 8.14%	David Carmichael (Ind.); 168 0.36%	Tony Clement
Parry Sound-Muskoka	Tony Clement; 25,864; 55.73%	Cindy Waters; 5,330; 11.48%	Wendy Wilson; 11,217; 24.17%	Glen Hodgson; 3,776; 8.14%	Albert Gray Smith (M-L); 54 0.12%	Tony Clement
Sault Ste. Marie	Bryan Hayes; 18,328; 41.44%	Christian Provenzano; 8,343; 18.86%	Tony Martin; 16,467; 37.23%	Luke Macmichael; 945; 2.14%	Randy Riauka (CHP); 111 0.25%	Tony Martin
Sault Ste. Marie	Bryan Hayes; 18,328; 41.44%	Christian Provenzano; 8,343; 18.86%	Tony Martin; 16,467; 37.23%	Luke Macmichael; 945; 2.14%	Mike Taffarel (M-L); 38 0.09%	Tony Martin
Sudbury	Fred Slade; 12,881; 28.35%	Carol Hartman; 8,172; 17.98%	Glenn Thibeault; 22,684; 49.92%	Fred Twilley; 1,359; 2.99%	Will Morin (FPNP); 229 0.50%	Glenn Thibeault
Sudbury	Fred Slade; 12,881; 28.35%	Carol Hartman; 8,172; 17.98%	Glenn Thibeault; 22,684; 49.92%	Fred Twilley; 1,359; 2.99%	J. David Popescu (Ind.); 116 0.26%	Glenn Thibeault
Thunder Bay—Rainy River	Moe Comuzzi-Stehmann; 10,097; 27.17%	Ken Boshcoff; 8,067; 21.71%	John Rafferty; 18,085; 48.67%	Ed Shields; 909; 2.45%		John Rafferty
Thunder Bay— Superior North	Richard Harvey; 10,894; 29.66%	Yves Fricot; 6,117; 16.66%	Bruce Hyer; 18,334; 49.92%	Scot Kyle; 1,115; 3.04%	Denis A. Carrière (Mar.); 265; 0.72%	Bruce Hyer
Timmins-James Bay	Bill Greenberg; 10,526; 31.69%	Marilyn Wood; 5,230; 15.74%	Charlie Angus; 16,738; 50.39%	Lisa Bennett; 724; 2.18%		Charlie Angus

== 2008 ==
Electoral district	Candidates					Incumbent
Electoral district	Conservative	Liberal	NDP	Green	Other	Incumbent
Algoma— Manitoulin— Kapuskasing	Dianne Musgrove; 5,914; 17.65%	Brent St. Denis; 10,902; 32.53%	Carol Hughes; 15,249; 45.50%	Lorraine Rekmans; 1,451; 4.33%		Brent St. Denis
Kenora	Greg Rickford; 9,395; 40.46%	Roger Valley; 7,344; 31.63%	Tania Cameron; 5,394; 23.23%	JoJo Holiday; 1,087; 4.68%		Roger Valley
Nickel Belt	Ian McCracken; 8,869; 21.70%	Louise Portelance; 10,748; 26.30%	Claude Gravelle; 19,021; 46.54%	Fred Twilley; 2,056; 5.03%	Steve Rutchinski (M-L); 66 0.16%	Raymond Bonin†
Nickel Belt	Ian McCracken; 8,869; 21.70%	Louise Portelance; 10,748; 26.30%	Claude Gravelle; 19,021; 46.54%	Fred Twilley; 2,056; 5.03%	Yves Villeneuve (Ind.); 112 0.27%	Raymond Bonin†
Nipissing—Timiskaming	Joe Sinicrope; 13,432; 32.34%	Anthony Rota; 18,510; 44.56%	Dianna Allen; 6,582; 15.85%	Craig Bridges; 2,808; 6.76%	Andrew Moulden (CAP); 204; 0.49%	Anthony Rota
Parry Sound-Muskoka	Tony Clement; 21,831; 50.19%	Jamie McGarvey; 10,871; 24.99%	Jo-Anne Boulding; 5,355; 12.31%	Glen Hodgson; 5,119; 11.77%	David Rowland (Ind.); 325; 0.75%	Tony Clement
Sault Ste. Marie	Cameron Ross; 15,461; 37.72%	Paul Bichler; 6,870; 16.76%	Tony Martin; 16,572; 40.43%	Luke Macmichael; 1,774; 4.33%	Cory McLeod (FPNP); 235 0.57%	Tony Martin
Sault Ste. Marie	Cameron Ross; 15,461; 37.72%	Paul Bichler; 6,870; 16.76%	Tony Martin; 16,572; 40.43%	Luke Macmichael; 1,774; 4.33%	Mike Taffarel (M-L); 81 0.20%	Tony Martin
Sudbury	Gerry Labelle; 11,073; 25.79%	Diane Marleau; 12,969; 30.20%	Glenn Thibeault; 15,094; 35.15%	Gordon Harris; 3,330; 7.75%	Will Morin (FPNP); 397 0.92%	Diane Marleau
Sudbury	Gerry Labelle; 11,073; 25.79%	Diane Marleau; 12,969; 30.20%	Glenn Thibeault; 15,094; 35.15%	Gordon Harris; 3,330; 7.75%	J. David Popescu (Ind.); 80 0.19%	Diane Marleau
Thunder Bay— Rainy River	Richard Neumann; 8,466; 23.58%	Ken Boshcoff; 11,589; 32.27%	John Rafferty; 14,478; 40.32%	Russ Aegard; 1,377; 3.83%		Ken Boshcoff
Thunder Bay— Superior North	Bev Sarafin; 9,556; 26.83%	Don McArthur; 10,083; 28.31%	Bruce Hyer; 13,187; 37.03%	Brendan Daniel Hughes; 2,463; 6.92%	Dennis Andrew Carrière (Mar.); 327; 0.92%	Joe Comuzzi†
Timmins— James Bay	Bill Greenberg; 5,536; 18.21%	Paul Taillefer; 6,740; 22.17%	Charlie Angus; 17,188; 56.54%	Larry Verner; 938; 3.09%		Charlie Angus

== 2006 ==
Electoral district	Candidates					Incumbent
Electoral district	Liberal	Conservative	NDP	Green	Other	Incumbent
Algoma—Manitoulin— Kapuskasing	Brent St. Denis; 14,652; 38.18%	Ian West; 8,957; 23.34%	Carol Hughes; 13,244; 34.51%	Sarah Hutchinson; 1,025; 2.67%	Will Morin (FPNP); 338 0.88%	Brent St. Denis
Algoma—Manitoulin— Kapuskasing	Brent St. Denis; 14,652; 38.18%	Ian West; 8,957; 23.34%	Carol Hughes; 13,244; 34.51%	Sarah Hutchinson; 1,025; 2.67%	Donald Milton Polmateer (Ind.); 164 0.43%	Brent St. Denis
Kenora	Roger Valley; 9,937; 36.52%	Bill Brown; 8,434; 30.99%	Susan Barclay; 8,149; 29.95%	Dave Vasey; 692; 2.54%		Roger Valley
Nickel Belt	Raymond Bonin; 19,775; 43.31%	Margaret Schwartzentruber; 5,732; 12.55%	Claude Gravelle; 17,668; 38.70%	Mark McAllister; 975; 2.14%	Michel D. Ethier (Mar.); 421 0.92%	Raymond Bonin
Nickel Belt	Raymond Bonin; 19,775; 43.31%	Margaret Schwartzentruber; 5,732; 12.55%	Claude Gravelle; 17,668; 38.70%	Mark McAllister; 975; 2.14%	Mathieu Péron (PC); 1,044 2.29%	Raymond Bonin
Nickel Belt	Raymond Bonin; 19,775; 43.31%	Margaret Schwartzentruber; 5,732; 12.55%	Claude Gravelle; 17,668; 38.70%	Mark McAllister; 975; 2.14%	Steve Rutchinski (M-L); 42 0.09%	Raymond Bonin
Nipissing—Timiskaming	Anthony Rota; 21,393; 44.69%	Peter Chirico; 16,511; 34.49%	Dave Fluri; 8,268; 17.27%	Meg Purdy; 1,698; 3.55%		Anthony Rota
Parry Sound-Muskoka	Andy Mitchell; 18,485; 40.04%	Tony Clement; 18,513; 40.10%	Jo-Anne Boulding; 5,472; 11.85%	Glen Hodgson; 3,701; 8.02%		Andy Mitchell
Sault Ste. Marie	Christian Provenzano; 15,825; 34.22%	Ken Walker; 11,099; 24.00%	Tony Martin; 17,979; 38.88%	Mark Viitala; 1,056; 2.28%	Guy Dumas (FPNP); 225 0.49%	Tony Martin
Sault Ste. Marie	Christian Provenzano; 15,825; 34.22%	Ken Walker; 11,099; 24.00%	Tony Martin; 17,979; 38.88%	Mark Viitala; 1,056; 2.28%	Mike Taffarel (M-L); 59 0.13%	Tony Martin
Sudbury	Diane Marleau; 19,809; 41.57%	Kevin Serviss; 10,332; 21.68%	Gerry McIntaggart; 15,225; 31.95%	Joey Methé; 1,301; 2.73%	Stephen Butcher (PC); 782 1.64%	Diane Marleau
Sudbury	Diane Marleau; 19,809; 41.57%	Kevin Serviss; 10,332; 21.68%	Gerry McIntaggart; 15,225; 31.95%	Joey Methé; 1,301; 2.73%	Sam Hammond (Comm.); 70 0.15%	Diane Marleau
Sudbury	Diane Marleau; 19,809; 41.57%	Kevin Serviss; 10,332; 21.68%	Gerry McIntaggart; 15,225; 31.95%	Joey Methé; 1,301; 2.73%	J. David Popescu (Ind.); 54 0.11%	Diane Marleau
Sudbury	Diane Marleau; 19,809; 41.57%	Kevin Serviss; 10,332; 21.68%	Gerry McIntaggart; 15,225; 31.95%	Joey Methé; 1,301; 2.73%	Dave Starbuck (M-L); 77 0.16%	Diane Marleau
Thunder Bay—Rainy River	Ken Boshcoff; 13,520; 35.13%	David Leskowski; 10,485; 27.25%	John Rafferty; 12,862; 33.42%	Russ Aegard; 1,193; 3.10%	Doug MacKay (Mar.); 424; 1.10%	Ken Boshcoff
Thunder Bay— Superior North	Joe Comuzzi; 14,009; 36.01%	Bev Sarafin; 8,578; 22.05%	Bruce Hyer; 13,601; 34.96%	Dawn Kannegiesser; 2,231; 5.73%	Denis A. Carrière (Mar.); 486; 1.25%	Joe Comuzzi
Timmins-James Bay	Robert Riopelle; 13,003; 34.26%	Ken Graham; 5,173; 13.63%	Charlie Angus; 19,195; 50.58%	Sahaja Freed; 578; 1.52%		Charlie Angus

== 2004 ==
Electoral district	Candidates					Incumbent
Electoral district	Liberal	Conservative	NDP	Green	Other	Incumbent
Algoma—Manitoulin—Kapuskasing	Brent St. Denis; 14,276; 40.94%	Blaine Armstrong; 8,093; 23.21%	Carol Hughes; 11,051; 31.69%	Lindsay Killen; 1,449; 4.16%		Brent St. Denis; Algoma—Manitoulin
Kenora	Roger Valley; 8,563; 36.23%	Bill Brown; 6,598; 27.92%	Susan Barclay; 7,577; 32.06%	Carl Chaboyer; 898; 3.80%		Bob Nault†; Kenora—Rainy River
Nickel Belt	Raymond Bonin; 17,188; 42.41%	Mike Dupont; 7,628; 18.82%	Claude Gravelle; 13,980; 34.50%	Steve Lafleur; 1,031; 2.54%	Michel D. Ethier (Mar.); 430 1.06%	Raymond Bonin
Nickel Belt	Raymond Bonin; 17,188; 42.41%	Mike Dupont; 7,628; 18.82%	Claude Gravelle; 13,980; 34.50%	Steve Lafleur; 1,031; 2.54%	Don Lavallee (Ind.); 217 0.54%	Raymond Bonin
Nickel Belt	Raymond Bonin; 17,188; 42.41%	Mike Dupont; 7,628; 18.82%	Claude Gravelle; 13,980; 34.50%	Steve Lafleur; 1,031; 2.54%	Steve Rutchinski (M-L); 51 0.13%	Raymond Bonin
Nipissing—Timiskaming	Anthony Rota; 18,254; 42.31%	Al McDonald; 16,001; 37.09%	Dave Fluri; 7,354; 17.05%	Les Wilcox; 1,329; 3.08%	Ross MacLean (CAP); 204; 0.47%	Bob Wood†; Nipissing
Parry Sound-Muskoka	Andy Mitchell; 19,271; 43.86%	Keith Montgomery; 15,970; 36.35%	Jo-Anne Marie Boulding; 5,171; 11.77%	Glen Hodgson; 3,524; 8.02%		Andy Mitchell
Sault Ste. Marie	Carmen Provenzano; 15,760; 36.55%	Cameron Ross; 9,969; 23.12%	Tony Martin; 16,512; 38.29%	Julie Emmerson; 814; 1.89%	Mike Taffarel (M-L); 67; 0.16%	Carmen Provenzano
Sudbury	Diane Marleau; 18,914; 44.19%	Stephen L. Butcher; 9,008; 21.05%	Gerry McIntaggart; 12,781; 29.86%	Luke Norton; 1,999; 4.67%	Dave Starbuck (M-L); 100; 0.23%	Diane Marleau
Thunder Bay—Rainy River	Ken Boshcoff; 14,290; 39.37%	David Leskowski; 9,559; 26.33%	John Rafferty; 10,781; 29.70%	Russ Aegard; 856; 2.36%	Johannes Scheibler (CHP); 267 0.74%	Stan Dromisky†; Thunder Bay—Atikokan
Thunder Bay—Rainy River	Ken Boshcoff; 14,290; 39.37%	David Leskowski; 9,559; 26.33%	John Rafferty; 10,781; 29.70%	Russ Aegard; 856; 2.36%	Doug Thompson (Mar.); 547 1.51%	Stan Dromisky†; Thunder Bay—Atikokan
Thunder Bay—Superior North	Joe Comuzzi; 15,022; 43.04%	Bev Sarafin; 7,394; 21.18%	Bruce Hyer; 10,230; 29.31%	Carl Rose; 1,614; 4.62%	Denis A. Carrière (Mar.); 645; 1.85%	Joe Comuzzi
Timmins—James Bay	Raymond Chénier; 13,525; 39.65%	Andrew Van Oosten; 5,682; 16.66%	Charlie Angus; 14,138; 41.45%	Marsha Gail Kriss; 767; 2.25%		Réginald Bélair†; Timmins—James Bay
Timmins—James Bay	Raymond Chénier; 13,525; 39.65%	Andrew Van Oosten; 5,682; 16.66%	Charlie Angus; 14,138; 41.45%	Marsha Gail Kriss; 767; 2.25%		merged district
Timmins—James Bay	Raymond Chénier; 13,525; 39.65%	Andrew Van Oosten; 5,682; 16.66%	Charlie Angus; 14,138; 41.45%	Marsha Gail Kriss; 767; 2.25%		Benoît Serré†; Timiskaming—Cochrane

== 2000 ==
Electoral district	Candidates						Incumbent
Electoral district	Liberal	Canadian Alliance	NDP	PC	Green	Other	Incumbent
Algoma—Manitoulin	Brent St. Denis; 15,000; 48.36%	Ron Swain; 8,992; 28.99%	Grant Buck; 4,326; 13.95%	Dale Lapham; 2,269; 7.32%	Alexander Jablanczy; 428; 1.38%		Brent St. Denis
Kenora—Rainy River	Bob Nault; 14,416; 45.21%	Ed Prefontaine; 9,125; 28.62%	Susan Barclay; 6,868; 21.54%	Brian Barrett; 1,476; 4.63%			Bob Nault
Nickel Belt	Raymond Bonin; 19,187; 55.57%	Neil Martin; 6,370; 18.45%	Sandy Bass; 7,304; 21.16%	Reg Couldridge; 1,664; 4.82%			Raymond Bonin
Nipissing	Bob Wood; 18,888; 57.04%	Ken Ferron; 7,461; 22.53%	Wendy Young; 2,572; 7.77%	Alan Dayes; 4,192; 12.66%			Bob Wood
Parry Sound—Muskoka	Andy Mitchell; 17,911; 47.52%	George Stripe; 9,569; 25.39%	Joanne Bury; 1,665; 4.42%	Keith Montgomery; 7,055; 18.72%	Richard Thomas; 1,495; 3.97%		Andy Mitchell
Sault Ste. Marie	Carmen F. Provenzano; 18,867; 50.79%	David Ronald Rose; 7,006; 18.86%	Bud Wildman; 9,202; 24.77%	Doug Lawson; 1,168; 3.14%	Kathie Brosemer; 776; 2.09%	Martin Bruce Odber (CAP); 128; 0.34%	Carmen Provenzano
Sudbury	Diane Marleau; 20,290; 58.52%	Mike Smith; 6,554; 18.90%	Paul Chislett; 4,368; 12.60%	Alex McGregor; 2,642; 7.62%	Thomas Gerry; 503; 1.45%	Daryl Janet Shandro (Comm.); 98 0.28% Kathy Wells-McNeil (CAP); 215 0.62%	Diane Marleau
Thunder Bay—Atikokan	Stan Dromisky; 11,449; 36.98%	David Richard Leskowski; 9,067; 29.29%	Rick Baker; 6,023; 19.45%	Ian M. Sinclair; 3,652; 11.80%	Kristin Boyer; 769; 2.48%		Stan Dromisky
Thunder Bay—Superior North	Joe Comuzzi; 15,241; 48.12%	Doug Pantry; 6,278; 19.82%	John Rafferty; 6,169; 19.48%	Richard Neumann; 2,753; 8.69%	Carl Rose; 648; 2.05%	Denis A. Carrière (Mar.); 581; 1.83%	Joe Comuzzi
Timiskaming—Cochrane	Benoît Serré; 19,404; 62.40%	Dan Louie; 5,840; 18.78%	Ambrose Raftis; 2,461; 7.91%	William J. Stairs; 2,603; 8.37%	Joseph Gold; 790; 2.54%		Benoit Serré
Timmins—James Bay	Réginald Bélair; 16,335; 54.22%	James Gibb; 3,356; 11.14%	Len Wood; 9,385; 31.15%	Daniel Clark; 1,053; 3.49%			Réginald Bélair
