= Carol Hughes (politician) =

Canadian politician

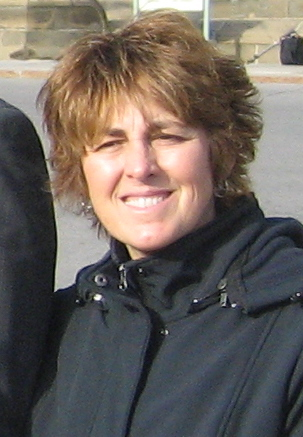

Member of Parliament for Algoma—Manitoulin—Kapuskasing
- In office October 14, 2008 – March 23, 2025
- Preceded by: Brent St. Denis
- Succeeded by: Riding dissolved

Assistant Deputy Speaker and Deputy Chair of Committees of the Whole
- In office December 7, 2015 – March 23, 2025
- Prime Minister: Justin Trudeau

Personal details
- Born: November 26, 1958 (age 67) Val Caron, Ontario
- Party: New Democratic Party
- Spouse: Keith Hughes
- Profession: CLC Staff Representative
- Website: https://carolhughes.ndp.ca/

Carol R. Hughes (born November 26, 1958) is a Canadian politician, who represented the electoral district of Algoma—Manitoulin—Kapuskasing in the House of Commons of Canada from 2008 until 2025. She is a member of the New Democratic Party.

Prior to being elected, she worked as a staff representative for the Canadian Labour Congress. She ran as the NDP's candidate in the 2004 election and the 2006 election, losing to Liberal incumbent Brent St. Denis both times.

She had told the press that she would not run in the 2008 election, but changed her mind after she stopped in Blind River for dinner on her way home from a Canadian Labour Congress meeting, and a couple she had never met approached her and encouraged her to run again. She won the riding in that election, defeating St. Denis, and was re-elected in the 2011 election.

Hughes endorsed Niki Ashton in the 2012 NDP leadership election, and Charlie Angus in the 2017 leadership election.

Hughes was appointed Assistant Deputy Speaker and Deputy Chair of Committees of the Whole for a second time; she previously held this role in the 42nd Parliament.

On April 4, 2024 she announced she would not run again for office in the 45th Canadian federal election.

Hughes endorsed Alberta MP Heather McPherson in the 2026 New Democratic Party leadership election.

== Electoral record ==
2021 Canadian federal election: Algoma—Manitoulin—Kapuskasing
Party	Candidate	Votes	%	±%	Expenditures
New Democratic	Carol Hughes	15,895	40.2	-1.4	$79,081.62
Conservative	John Sagman	10,885	27.5	+1.3	none listed
Liberal	Duke Peltier	8,888	22.5	-1.8	$48,545.29
People's	Harry Jaaskelainen	2,840	7.2	+5.0	$1,805.85
Green	Stephen Zimmermann	726	1.8	-3.6	$42.50
Christian Heritage	Clarence Baarda	289	0.7		$9,805.46
Total valid votes		39,523			
Total rejected ballots		291			
Turnout		39,814	59.88		
Eligible voters		66,487			
New Democratic hold		Swing		-1.35	
Source: Elections Canada

2019 Canadian federal election: Algoma—Manitoulin—Kapuskasing
Party	Candidate	Votes	%	±%	Expenditures
New Democratic	Carol Hughes	16,883	41.59	+1.67	$105,479.79
Conservative	Dave Williamson	10,625	26.18	+2.44	$58,396.49
Liberal	Heather Wilson	9,879	24.34	-9.77	$61,853.69
Green	Max Chapman	2,192	5.40	+3.16	none listed
People's	Dave Delisle	887	2.19		none listed
Rhinoceros	Le Marquis de Marmalade	125	0.31		$0.00
Total valid votes/expense limit		40,591	99.06		
Total rejected ballots		384	0.94	+0.55	
Turnout		40,975	62.17	-3.49	
Eligible voters		65,906			
New Democratic hold		Swing		-0.38	
Source: Elections Canada

2015 Canadian federal election: Algoma—Manitoulin—Kapuskasing
Party	Candidate	Votes	%	±%	Expenditures
New Democratic	Carol Hughes	16,516	39.92	−10.01	$79,801.31
Liberal	Heather Wilson	14,111	34.11	+19.66	$36,962.72
Conservative	André Robichaud	9,820	23.73	−8.77	$54,344.43
Green	Calvin John Orok	927	2.24	−0.84	–
Total valid votes/expense limit		41,374	99.61		$247,218.89
Total rejected ballots		161	0.39	–	
Turnout		41,535	65.66		
Eligible voters		63,253			
New Democratic hold		Swing		-14.84	
Source: Elections Canada

2011 Canadian federal election: Algoma—Manitoulin—Kapuskasing
Party	Candidate	Votes	%	±%	Expenditures
New Democratic	Carol Hughes	18,747	51.73	+6.24	–
Conservative	Ray Sturgeon	10,943	30.19	+12.55	–
Liberal	François Cloutier	5,375	14.83	-17.70	–
Green	Lorraine Rekmans	1,212	3.34	-0.98	–
Total valid votes/expense limit		36,242	100.00		
Total rejected ballots		179	0.49		
Turnout		36,421	62.76		
New Democratic Party hold		Swing	-3.2		

2008 Canadian federal election: Algoma—Manitoulin—Kapuskasing
Party	Candidate	Votes	%	±%	Expenditures
New Democratic	Carol Hughes	15,249	45.49	+10.98	$91,893
Liberal	Brent St. Denis	10,902	32.53	-5.65	$90,379
Conservative	Dianne Musgrove	5,914	17.64	-5.70	$8,989
Green	Lorraine Rekmans	1,451	4.32	+1.65	$5,448
Total valid votes/expense limit		33,516	100.00	$97,228	
Total rejected ballots		175	0.52		
Turnout		33,691	56.53		
New Democratic Party gain from Liberal		Swing	+8.3		

2006 Canadian federal election: Algoma—Manitoulin—Kapuskasing
Party	Candidate	Votes	%	±%	Expenditures
Liberal	Brent St. Denis	14,652	38.18	−2.76	$52,836
New Democratic	Carol Hughes	13,244	34.51	+2.82	$51,642
Conservative	Ian West	8,957	23.34	+0.13	$65,745
Green	Sarah Hutchinson	1,025	2.67	−1.40	$647
First Peoples National	Will Morin	338	0.88	–	$829
Independent	Donald Polmateer	164	0.43	–	none listed
Total valid votes		38,380	100.00		
Total rejected ballots		216	0.56		
Turnout		38,596	63.99		
Electors on the lists		60,311			
Sources: Official Results, Elections Canada and Financial Returns, Elections Canada.

2004 Canadian federal election: Algoma—Manitoulin—Kapuskasing
Party	Candidate	Votes	%
Liberal	Brent St. Denis	14,276	40.94
New Democratic	Carol Hughes	11,051	31.69
Conservative	Blaine Armstrong	8,093	23.21
Green	Lindsay Killen	1,449	4.16
Total		34,869	100.00
