= Brent St. Denis =

Canadian politician

Member of Parliament for Algoma—Manitoulin—Kapuskasing Algoma—Manitoulin, 1997–2004 Algoma, 1994–1997
- In office January 17, 1994 – September 7, 2008
- Preceded by: Maurice Foster
- Succeeded by: Carol Hughes

Personal details
- Born: May 27, 1950 (age 75) Blind River, Canada
- Party: Liberal
- Spouse: Martine Fabris

Brent J. St. Denis (born May 27, 1950) is a Canadian politician. He was a Liberal member of the House of Commons of Canada from 1993 to 2008. First elected to represent the Ontario riding of Algoma in the 1993 Canadian federal election, he went on to serve successor ridings Algoma—Manitoulin and later Algoma—Manitoulin—Kapuskasing.

Born in Blind River, Ontario, St. Denis is a former executive assistant, industrial engineer, and teacher.

He is a former parliamentary secretary to the Minister of Natural Resources and the Minister of Transport, and also served as chair of the House of Commons' standing committee on industry, science, and technology, as well as that committee's subcommittee on agenda and procedure.

In the 2008 federal election, St. Denis lost his seat to Carol Hughes of the New Democratic Party, whom he had defeated in 2004 and 2006.

He is currently employed as clerk and treasurer for the township of Cockburn Island.

== Electoral record ==
2008 Canadian federal election: Algoma—Manitoulin—Kapuskasing
Party	Candidate	Votes	%	±%	Expenditures
New Democratic	Carol Hughes	15,249	45.49	+10.98	$91,893
Liberal	Brent St. Denis	10,902	32.53	-5.65	$90,379
Conservative	Dianne Musgrove	5,914	17.64	-5.70	$8,989
Green	Lorraine Rekmans	1,451	4.32	+1.65	$5,448
Total valid votes/expense limit		33,516	100.00	$97,228	
Total rejected ballots		175	0.52		
Turnout		33,691	56.53		
New Democratic Party gain from Liberal		Swing	+8.3		

2006 Canadian federal election: Algoma—Manitoulin—Kapuskasing
Party	Candidate	Votes	%	±%	Expenditures
Liberal	Brent St. Denis	14,652	38.18	−2.76	$52,836
New Democratic	Carol Hughes	13,244	34.51	+2.82	$51,642
Conservative	Ian West	8,957	23.34	+0.13	$65,745
Green	Sarah Hutchinson	1,025	2.67	−1.40	$647
First Peoples National	Will Morin	338	0.88	–	$829
Independent	Donald Polmateer	164	0.43	–	none listed
Total valid votes		38,380	100.00		
Total rejected ballots		216	0.56		
Turnout		38,596	63.99		
Electors on the lists		60,311			
Sources: Official Results, Elections Canada and Financial Returns, Elections Canada.

2004 Canadian federal election: Algoma—Manitoulin—Kapuskasing
Party	Candidate	Votes	%
Liberal	Brent St. Denis	14,276	40.94
New Democratic	Carol Hughes	11,051	31.69
Conservative	Blaine Armstrong	8,093	23.21
Green	Lindsay Killen	1,449	4.16
Total		34,869	100.00

2000 Canadian federal election: Algoma-Manitoulin
Party	Candidate	Votes	%
Liberal	Brent St. Denis	15,000	48.36
Alliance	Ron Swain	8,992	28.99
New Democratic	Grant Buck	4,326	13.95
Progressive Conservative	Dale Lapham	2,269	7.32
Green	Alexander Jablanczy	428	1.38

1997 Canadian federal election: Algoma-Manitoulin
Party	Candidate	Votes	%
Liberal	Brent St. Denis	13,810	41.31
Reform	Jim Jeffery	8,353	24.99
New Democratic	Jody Wildman	7,897	23.62
Progressive Conservative	Roseanne MacDonald	3,367	10.07

1993 Canadian federal election: Algoma
Party	Candidate	Votes	%
Liberal	Brent St. Denis	18,218	58.05
Reform	Ken Leffler	6,623	21.10
Progressive Conservative	David Mair	3,613	11.51
New Democratic	Gayle Erma Broad	2,696	8.59
Natural Law	Bernard Brégaint	235	0.75
