= Wemyss Mackenzie Simpson =

Canadian politician

Wemyss Mackenzie (McKenzie) Simpson (March 30, 1824 – March 31, 1894) was a Canadian fur trader and political figure. He represented Algoma in the House of Commons of Canada as a Conservative member from 1867 to 1871.

He was born in London, England in 1824, the son of Geddes Mackenzie Simpson. He studied at Eton College and came to Lower Canada in 1841 as an employee of the Hudson's Bay Company. Simpson served with the company until 1864, serving as the last factor for the post at Sault Ste. Marie, where he settled after his retirement. His cousin, George Simpson, was a governor of the Hudson's Bay Company. In 1870, Simpson acted as guide and interpreter for the Red River Expeditionary Force. In 1871, he was named Indian Commissioner for Rupert's Land and resigned from his seat in the House of Commons. Later that same year, he arranged Treaties 1 and 2 with the Ojibwa and Swampy Cree Nations in southern Manitoba.

Simpson was married twice: to Annie Ironside in 1853 and later to Eliza Ironside, her sister. He died at Fort Monroe, Virginia in 1894.

== Electoral record ==
1867 Canadian federal election: Algoma
Party	Candidate	Votes	%
Conservative	Wemyss Mackenzie Simpson	250	47.26
Unknown	William Beatty	241	45.56
Unknown	A. MacDonell	38	7.18
Eligible voters		862	
Source: Canadian Parliamentary Guide, 1871

Parliament of Canada
Preceded by None	Member of Parliament from Algoma; 1867–1871	Succeeded by Frederick William Cumberland
