= Albert Dyment =

Canadian politician

Albert Edward Dyment
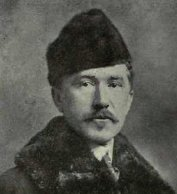

Member of the Canadian Parliament for Algoma
- In office 1896–1904
- Preceded by: George Hugh Macdonell
- Succeeded by: District was abolished in 1903

Member of the Canadian Parliament for Algoma East
- In office 1904–1908
- Succeeded by: William Ross Smyth

Personal details
- Born: February 23, 1869 Lynden, Ontario
- Died: May 12, 1944 (aged 75) Toronto, Ontario
- Occupation: stockbroker

Albert Edward Dyment (February 23, 1869 – May 12, 1944) was a Canadian politician and businessman.

Born at Lynden, County of Wentworth, Ontario, the son of Nathaniel Dyment, of English descent, and Annie McRae, of Scottish origin, he was educated at Barrie Collegiate Institute and at Upper Canada College. Dyment was a prosperous manufacturer and dealer in lumber, based in Thessalon, Ontario. He was elected for Algoma to the House of Commons in 1896 and in 1900 and for Algoma East in 1904 as a Liberal. He was Honorary Lieutenant-Colonel of the 97th Regiment in 1907.

In 1892, he married Edith Francis Chapman. He served on the town council for Barrie in 1892. In 1906, he sold his business and became a stockbroker in Toronto. Dyment was president of Sovereign Life Assurance Company and chairman of Canadian General Electric. He died in Toronto at the age of 75.

1900 Canadian federal election: Algoma
Party	Candidate	Votes	%
Liberal	Albert Dyment	3,083	53.09
Conservative	Arthur Cyril Boyce	2,724	46.91
