= George Hugh Macdonell =

Canadian politician

George H. Macdonell

Member of the Canadian Parliament for Algoma
- In office 1891–1896
- Preceded by: Simon James Dawson
- Succeeded by: Albert Dyment

Mayor of Port Arthur, Ontario (present-day Thunder Bay, Ontario)
- In office 1886–1888, 1900

Personal details
- Born: February 10, 1851 Toronto, Canada West
- Died: April 3, 1920 (aged 69) Lethbridge, Alberta
- Party: Conservative
- Spouse(s): Eliza McCracken (m. 1876–1893; her death)
- Occupation: contractor

George Hugh Macdonell (10 February 1851 – 1 April 1920) was a contractor and political figure in Ontario, Canada. He represented Algoma in the House of Commons of Canada from 1891 to 1896 as a Conservative member.

He was born in Toronto, Canada West, the son of Duncan Macdonell, and was educated in Williamstown and at Bishop's College in Lennoxville, Quebec. He continued his education in the military schools of Montreal and served with Colonel Garnet Wolseley in the Red River Expedition. Macdonell operated a warehouse in Montreal for several years. He was then hired by contractors working on the Canadian Pacific Railway, later going into business on his own and moving to Port Arthur. In 1876, Macdonell married Eliza McCracken. Macdonell was also involved in mining and was an insurance agent. Macdonell was mayor of Port Arthur from 1886 to 1888. He ran unsuccessfully for a seat in the Ontario assembly in 1890. Macdonell defeated Daniel Francis Burk in the 1887 federal election but was defeated by Albert Dyment when he ran for reelection to the House of Commons in 1896. His wife, Eliza died in 1893.

He was elected Port Arthur mayor again in 1900 but left to pursue business interests in Manitoba. Later, he was named Dominion Lands Agent for Medicine Hat and then Lethbridge.

George Hugh Macdonnell died in Lethbridge on April 1, 1920. He was buried at the Lethbridge Cemetery.

== Electoral record ==
1896 Canadian federal election: Algoma
Party	Candidate	Votes	%
Liberal	Albert Dyment	3,176	70.19
Conservative	George Hugh Macdonell	1,349	29.81

1891 Canadian federal election: Algoma
Party	Candidate	Votes	%
Conservative	George Hugh Macdonell	2,251	55.39
Unknown	Daniel F. Burk	1,813	44.61
