= Maurice Foster (politician) =

Canadian politician

Maurice Brydon Foster

Member of the Canadian Parliament for Algoma
- In office 1968–1993
- Preceded by: Electoral district created in 1966
- Succeeded by: Brent St. Denis

Personal details
- Born: September 8, 1933 Bloomfield, Ontario, Canada
- Died: October 2, 2010 (aged 77) Ottawa, Ontario, Canada
- Party: Liberal
- Spouse: Janet Kerr
- Committees: Chair, Standing Committee on Veterans Affairs (1972); Chair, Standing Committee on Northern Pipelines; Chair, Standing Committee on Privileges and Elections
- Portfolio: • Parliamentary Secretary to the President of the Privy Council (1974) • Parliamentary Secretary to the Minister of Energy, Mines and Resources (1974–1976) • Parliamentary Secretary to the President of the Treasury Board (1984)

Maurice Brydon Foster (September 8, 1933 – October 2, 2010) was a Canadian veterinarian and politician. He represented the electoral district of Algoma in the House of Commons of Canada from 1968 to 1993. He was a member of the Liberal Party.

Born in Bloomfield, Ontario, Foster attended the Ontario Veterinary College in Guelph and received a Doctor of Veterinary Medicine degree in 1957. He then moved to Carnduff, Saskatchewan where he practiced as a veterinarian. In 1959, he moved to Desbarats near Sault Ste. Marie, Ontario.

In 1968, he was elected to the House of Commons of Canada for the riding of Algoma. After retiring in 1993, he served as an adviser to Prime Minister Jean Chrétien. He retired in 2001.

He died in 2010 after a three-year battle with pulmonary fibrosis.

== Electoral record ==
1988 Canadian federal election: Algoma
Party	Candidate	Votes	%
Liberal	Maurice Foster	16,766	53.24
Progressive Conservative	Jim Reed	7,383	23.45
New Democratic	Lloyd Greenspoon	7,341	23.31

1984 Canadian federal election: Algoma
Party	Candidate	Votes	%
Liberal	Maurice Foster	14,113	38.26
Progressive Conservative	Jim Reed	12,811	34.73
New Democratic	Rocco Frangione	9,499	25.75
Not affiliated	Harold Bruzas	462	1.25

1980 Canadian federal election: Algoma
Party	Candidate	Votes	%
Liberal	Maurice Foster	17,432	50.54
New Democratic	Jim Dinner	11,262	32.65
Progressive Conservative	Bernt Gilbertson	5,633	16.33
Libertarian	Leslie T. Reid	113	0.33
Marxist–Leninist	David Grey	49	0.14
lop.parl.ca

1979 Canadian federal election: Algoma
Party	Candidate	Votes	%
Liberal	Maurice Foster	15,277	45.04
New Democratic	Jim Dinner	10,989	32.40
Progressive Conservative	Fred Sagle	7,531	22.20
Marxist–Leninist	Wayne Derrah	121	0.36

1974 Canadian federal election: Algoma
Party	Candidate	Votes	%
Liberal	Maurice Foster	11,360	52.02
New Democratic	Hughene MacDonald	5,240	24.00
Progressive Conservative	Ron Ritchie	5,136	23.52
Independent	Fernand Trottier	100	0.46
Source: Canadian Elections Database

1972 Canadian federal election: Algoma
Party	Candidate	Votes	%
Liberal	Maurice Foster	10,160	45.89
Progressive Conservative	Dale Burley	6,721	30.36
New Democratic	Kelly Sweeney	4,599	20.77
Social Credit	Nil F. Cote	508	2.29
Independent	George Washington Strain	150	0.68

1968 Canadian federal election: Algoma
Party	Candidate	Votes	%
Liberal	Maurice Foster	9,542	50.57
Progressive Conservative	John D. McPhail	5,270	27.93
New Democratic	Len Lefebvre	4,057	21.50
