= Edward Borron =

Canadian politician

Edward Barnes Borron
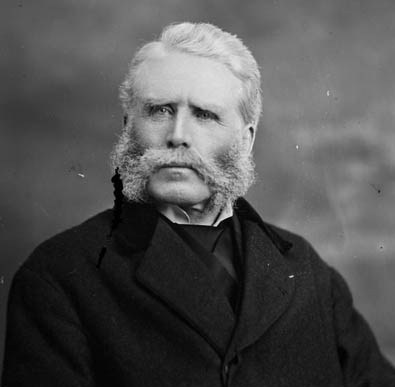

Member of the Canadian Parliament for Algoma
- In office 1874–1878
- Preceded by: John Beverley Robinson
- Succeeded by: Simon James Dawson

Personal details
- Born: December 6, 1820 Woolden Hall, near Warrington, England
- Died: April 23, 1915 (aged 94) Toronto, Ontario, Canada
- Party: Liberal

Edward Barnes Borron (December 6, 1820 – April 23, 1915) was a Canadian politician. He represented the electoral district of Algoma in the House of Commons of Canada from 1874 to 1878. He was a member of the Liberal Party.

The son of John Arthur Borron and Mary Geddes, he was educated at Lancashire, Newcastle upon Tyne and the University of Edinburgh before entering work in his father's mines in Lanarkshire. In 1842, he became general manager. Borron came to Upper Canada in 1850, working in Michigan before becoming general manager for the Montreal Mining Company's operation at Bruce Mines. He married Marie-Edesse Février dit Laramée in 1854. In 1858, he returned to Scotland but came back to the Sault Ste. Marie area in 1862. From 1869 to 1873, he was crown lands agent and mining inspector for the province in the Lake Superior division. In 1879, he was named stipendiary magistrate for the northern Nipissing district. He retired to Toronto in 1904 and died there in 1915.

1874 Canadian federal election: Algoma
Party	Candidate	Votes	%
Liberal	Edward Borron	436	61.24
Unknown	W. J. Scott	258	36.24
Unknown	P. J. Brown	18	2.53
Source: Canadian Elections Database
