= John Beverley Robinson =

Mayor of Toronto

The Honourable John Beverley Robinson
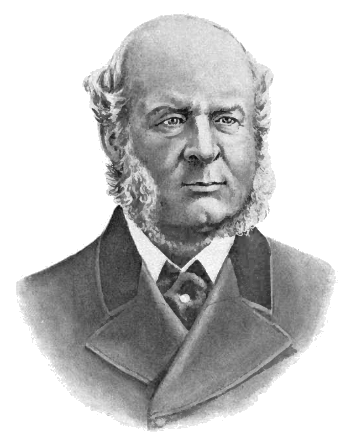

5th Lieutenant Governor of Ontario
- In office July 1, 1880 – May 31, 1887
- Monarch: Victoria
- Governors General: Marquess of Lorne; The Marquess of Lansdowne
- Premier: Oliver Mowat
- Preceded by: Donald Alexander Macdonald
- Succeeded by: Sir Alexander Campbell

Member of the Canadian Parliament for Algoma
- In office October 12, 1872 – January 22, 1874
- Preceded by: Frederick William Cumberland
- Succeeded by: Edward Borron

Member of the Canadian Parliament for West Toronto
- In office November 6, 1875 – June 30, 1880
- Preceded by: Thomas Moss
- Succeeded by: James Beaty Jr.

12th Mayor of Toronto
- In office 1856–1856
- Preceded by: George William Allan
- Succeeded by: John Hutchison

Personal details
- Born: February 21, 1821 York, Upper Canada
- Died: June 19, 1896 (aged 75) Toronto, Ontario
- Party: Conservative
- Spouse: Mary Jane Hagerman (m. 1847)

John Beverley Robinson (February 21, 1821 – June 19, 1896) was a Canadian politician, lawyer and businessman. He was mayor of Toronto and a provincial and federal member of parliament. He was the fifth Lieutenant Governor of Ontario between the years 1880–1887.

== Biography ==
Robinson was born in York, Upper Canada (later Toronto) in 1821, the son of Sir John Robinson, an important political figure in Upper Canada. He attended Upper Canada College, where he was a leading cricketer, eventually representing Canada in the inaugural international cricket match, against United States in 1844.

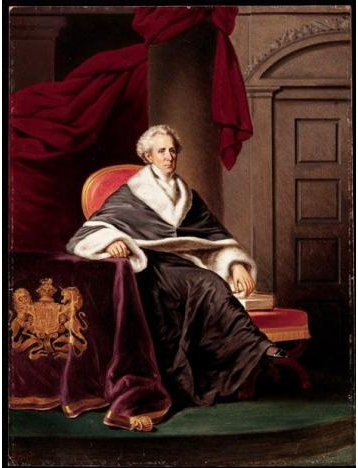
Sir John Robinson, father of John Beverley Robinson, by George Theodore Berthon, c. 1846

During the Upper Canada Rebellion of 1837, Robinson served as aide-de-camp to Sir Francis Bond Head. He later studied law and was called to the bar in 1844. He became an alderman in Toronto at St. Patrick's Ward during the 1850s, including a term as mayor in 1856. He was also involved in the incorporation of a number of companies in the Toronto area including the Toronto and Georgian Bay Canal Company in 1856. He was elected to the 6th Parliament of the Province of Canada representing Toronto in 1858. He helped promote the Northern Railway and served as president from 1862 to 1875. He represented Algoma in the House of Commons of Canada in 1872 and represented West Toronto in 1878. He was also a member of the Orange Order in Canada.

He briefly lived at The Grange, a house in Springfield, Toronto Township. Now Erindale, a community in Mississauga, it is home to Heritage Mississauga.

He suffered a stroke while preparing to give a speech at Massey Hall in Toronto and died in 1896.

== Family ==
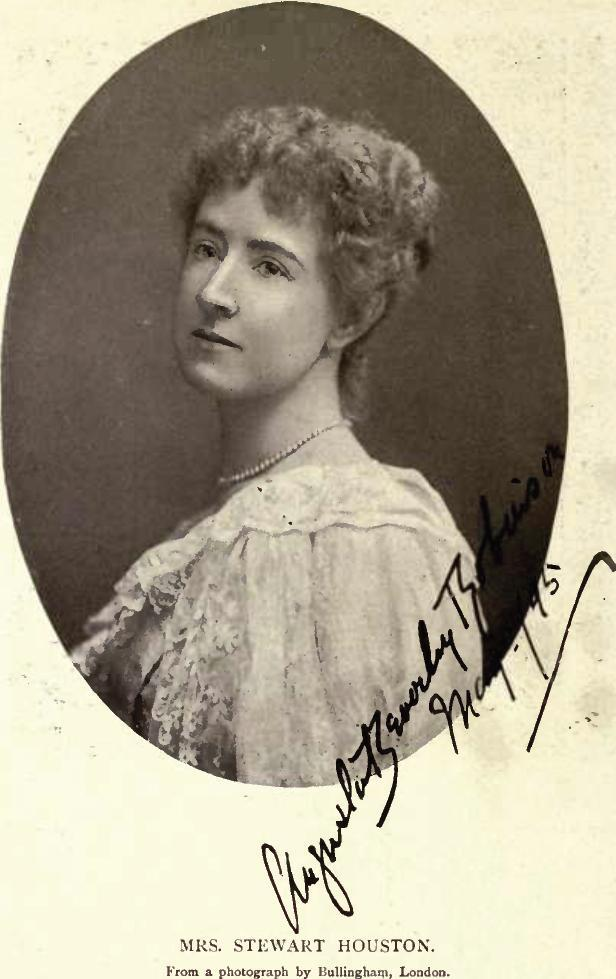
Augusta Louise (Robinson) Houston

Hon. John Beverley Robinson married Mary Jane Hagerman, daughter of Judge Christopher Alexander Hagerman and his wife Elizabeth, daughter of James Macaulay. Their daughter Minnie Caroline Robinson was born and educated in Toronto. She married, 1881, William Forsyth-Grant, Esquire, formerly Captain of H.M.'s 82nd Regiment, son of William Forsyth, Esquire, of Ecclesgreig Castle, County Kincardine, Scotland, J. P. and D.L., who, in 1842, assumed by Royal licence the additional surname of Grant (Chad-wick). her husband was grandson of John Forsyth of Montreal. She contributed to periodicals and newspapers and authored a travel book "Scenes in Hawaii, or Life in the Sandwich Islands." She served as President of the Woman's Historical Society of Toronto, and was elected President of the Ladies' Relief Society of Toronto, Ontario.

The couple's youngest daughter Augusta Louisa, sang in London at public concerts, in company with other artists, and was also on tour in the Provinces. During John Beverley Robinson's term as Lieutenant-Governor of Ontario, 1880–87, his wife Mary Jane Robinson and daughter Augusta Louise dispensed the hospitalities of Government House. She frequently sang at Government House and subsequently took vocal instruction in London, from Randegger, and in Paris, from Laborde. In London she lived with the song composer, Maude Valérie White. Augusta Louisa returned to Canada in 1895, and sang on tour with Emma Albani, Pol Plançon, Harry Plunket Greene, and Allan James Foley. She married, October 8, 1898, Stewart Fielde Houston, Barrister.

== Electoral record ==
1872 Canadian federal election: Algoma
Party	Candidate	Votes	%
Conservative	John Beverly Robinson	300	57.80
Unknown	George Taylor Denison III	219	42.20
Source: Canadian Elections Database

== Sources ==
- Adams, P. (2010) A history of Canadian cricket, lulu.com. ISBN 978-1-4466-9652-1.
- Saunders, Robert E. (1976). "Robinson, Sir John Beverley". In Halpenny, Francess G. (ed.). Dictionary of Canadian Biography. Vol. IX (1861–1870) (online ed.). University of Toronto Press.

Government offices
Preceded by Donald Alexander Macdonald	Lieutenant Governor of Ontario; 1880–1887	Succeeded by Sir Alexander Campbell
Professional and academic associations
Preceded by Sir John Henry Lefroy	President of the Royal Canadian Institute	Succeeded by George William Allan
