= John Rafferty (Canadian politician) =

Canadian politician (1953–2019)

Member of Parliament for Thunder Bay—Rainy River
- In office October 14, 2008 – October 19, 2015
- Preceded by: Ken Boshcoff
- Succeeded by: Don Rusnak

Personal details
- Born: July 3, 1953 Wingham, Ontario, Canada
- Died: June 30, 2019 (aged 65) Neebing, Ontario, Canada
- Party: New Democratic Party
- Profession: instructor, teacher, small business owner

John Rafferty (July 3, 1953 – June 30, 2019) was a Canadian politician, who served as the Member of Parliament for Thunder Bay—Rainy River from 2008 to 2015 for the NDP.

Rafferty was previously the party's candidate in Thunder Bay—Superior North for the 2000 federal election, in Thunder Bay—Rainy River for the 2004 and 2006 federal elections, and in Thunder Bay—Atikokan in the 2003 and 2007 provincial elections. Provincially, he lost to incumbent MPP Bill Mauro by a margin of just 50 votes in 2007.

Rafferty was born in Wingham, Ontario. He worked as a radio broadcaster for CKPR in Thunder Bay before leaving to pursue his first election campaign. He subsequently launched his own business producing voiceovers for educational and training videos.

Rafferty introduced one piece of legislation: the National Strategy for Fetal Alcohol Spectrum Disorder Act. He first introduced it on September 30, 2010, in the third session of the 40th Parliament as a private member's bill. He re-introduced it in June 2011, during the first session of the 41st Parliament.

He was slated to represent the Ontario New Democratic Party in the 2018 Ontario provincial election campaign, but withdrew in January 2018 due to ill health. He died on June 30, 2019, from cancer, at the age of 65.

== Electoral record ==
2015 Canadian federal election
Party	Candidate	Votes	%	±%	Expenditures
Liberal	Don Rusnak	18,523	44.01	+22.31	$69,724.11
New Democratic	John Rafferty	12,483	29.66	-18.99	$106,616.41
Conservative	Moe Comuzzi	8,876	21.09	-6.12	$64,890.91
Green	Christy Radbourne	2,201	5.23	+2.79	$3,586.52
Total valid votes/Expense limit		42,083	100.0		$233,739.33
Total rejected ballots		176	–	–	
Turnout		42,259	67.6	+7.5	
Eligible voters		62,773			
Source: Elections Canada

2011 Canadian federal election
Party	Candidate	Votes	%	±%
New Democratic	John Rafferty	18,039	48.1	+7.8
Conservative	Moe Comuzzi-Stehmann	10,096	27.2	+3.6
Liberal	Ken Boshcoff	8,066	21.7	-10.6
Green	Ed Shields	909	2.4	-1.4
Total valid votes		37,110		

2008 Canadian federal election
Party	Candidate	Votes	%	±%
New Democratic	John Rafferty	14,473	40.3	+6.9
Liberal	Ken Boshcoff	11,589	32.3	-2.8
Conservative	Richard Neumann	8,466	23.6	-3.6
Green	Russ Aegard	1,377	3.8	+0.7
Total valid votes		35,905		

2007 Ontario general election
Party	Candidate	Votes	%	±%
Liberal	Bill Mauro	10,913	37.7	-20.55
New Democratic	John Rafferty	10,877	37.5	+15.88
Progressive Conservative	Rebecca Johnson	5,914	20.4	+2.78
Green	Russ Aegard	1,271	4.4	+1.89

2006 Canadian federal election
Party	Candidate	Votes	%	±%
Liberal	Ken Boshcoff	13,525	35.1%	
New Democratic	John Rafferty	12,862	33.4%	
Conservative	David Leskowski	10,485	27.2%	
Green	Russ Aegard	1,189	3.1%	
Marijuana	Doug MacKay	424	1.1%	
Total valid votes		38,485		

2004 Canadian federal election
Party	Candidate	Votes
Liberal	Ken Boshcoff	14,290
New Democratic	John Rafferty	10,781
Conservative	David Leskowski	9,559
Green	Russ Aegard	856
Marijuana	Doug Thompson	547
Christian Heritage	Johannes Scheibler	267

2003 Ontario general election
Party	Candidate	Votes	%	±%
Liberal	Bill Mauro	17735	58.25	-5.78
New Democratic	John Rafferty	6582	21.62	4.86
Progressive Conservative	Brian McKinnon	5365	17.62	-1.59
Green	Kristin Boyer	762	2.5	

2000 Canadian federal election
Party	Candidate	Votes
Liberal	Joe Comuzzi	15,241
Alliance	Doug Pantry	6,278
New Democratic	John Rafferty	6,169
Progressive Conservative	Richard Neumann	2,753
Green	Carl Rose	648
Marijuana	Denis A. Carrière	581
