= Don Rusnak =

Canadian politician (born 1975)

Parliamentary Secretary to the Minister of Indigenous Services
- In office September 19, 2017 – August 31, 2018
- Minister: Jane Philpott
- Preceded by: portfolio established
- Succeeded by: Dan Vandal

Member of Parliament for Thunder Bay—Rainy River
- In office October 19, 2015 – September 11, 2019
- Preceded by: John Rafferty
- Succeeded by: Marcus Powlowski

Personal details
- Born: October 5, 1975 (age 50) Thunder Bay, Ontario
- Party: Liberal
- Spouse: Amanda
- Education: Robson Hall; Lakehead University
- Profession: Barrister

Don Rusnak (born October 5, 1975) is a Canadian politician who served as the Member of Parliament (MP) for the riding of Thunder Bay—Rainy River in the House of Commons of Canada from 2015 to 2019 as a member of the Liberal Party of Canada.

== Biography ==
Born and raised in Northwestern Ontario, Rusnak has deep roots in Thunder Bay–Rainy River, and as the son of Ukrainian and Anishinaabe (Ojibway) parents.

== Education ==
Rusnak studied Political Science and Integrated Forest Resource Management at Lakehead University. In 2001, Rusnak attended the University of Manitoba, Robson Hall Faculty of Law, and during his final year, attended Osgoode Hall Law School to study in the Intensive Program in Aboriginal Lands, Resources and Governments.

== Career prior to election ==
Rusnak has extensive professional experience drawing from his work in the forestry industry, public sector, and from his own legal practice. While working with Manitoba Health, Rusnak helped to improve the delivery of healthcare services for Northern Manitobans, and as a Crown Prosecutor in Eastern Alberta, he prosecuted criminal and regulatory offences. Rusnak served as the interim executive director for Grand Council Treaty No. 3 in Kenora.

Rusnak has volunteered his time with many organizations, such as the Ontario Justice Education Network and the Martin Aboriginal Education Initiative – a group which improves elementary and secondary school education outcomes for Aboriginal Canadians through the implementation of specific programs and the application of appropriate research.

== Federal politics ==
Rusnak was elected to represent the riding of Thunder Bay—Rainy River 2015 federal election, defeating incumbent MP John Rafferty. He was the only First Nation MP elected in the province of Ontario.

In September 2017, Rusnak was appointed as parliamentary secretary to the Minister of Indigenous Services. He stepped down from this role in August 2018, citing family concerns.

In November 2018, Rusnak was acclaimed as the Liberal candidate to run in the 2019 federal election. However, he later decided not to run for re-election.

== Political roles ==
- Standing Committee on Indigenous and Northern Affairs
- Standing Joint Committee of the Library of Parliament
- Chair of the Indigenous Caucus
- Director-at-Large Canada-Ukraine Parliamentary Friendship Group

== Electoral record ==
2015 Canadian federal election: Thunder Bay—Rainy River
Party	Candidate	Votes	%	±%	Expenditures
Liberal	Don Rusnak	18,523	44.02	+22.31	$69,724.11
New Democratic	John Rafferty	12,483	29.66	-18.99	$106,616.41
Conservative	Moe Comuzzi	8,876	21.09	-6.12	$64,890.91
Green	Christy Radbourne	2,201	5.23	+2.79	$3,586.52
Total valid votes/Expense limit		42,083	99.58		$233,739.33
Total rejected ballots		176	0.42	–	
Turnout		42,259	66.33		
Eligible voters		63,708			
Liberal gain from New Democratic		Swing		+20.65	
Source: Elections Canada
