= Will Morin =

Leader of the First Peoples National Party of Canada
- In office 2010–2013
- Preceded by: Barbara Wardlaw

Personal details
- Born: Sault Ste. Marie, Ontario, Canada
- Party: First Peoples National Party
- Occupation: artist, university professor

Will Morin is a Canadian politician, who served as the leader of the First Peoples National Party of Canada from 2010 until the party's dissolution in 2013.

Morin was born in Sault Ste. Marie, Ontario, and is a member of the Michipicoten First Nation. He was a medical assistant in the Canadian Forces during the 1991 Gulf War. He later obtained a Bachelor of Fine Arts degree from the Nova Scotia College of Art and Design in Halifax, as well as a Bachelor of Arts degree in Native Studies and a Master of Arts degree in humanities from Laurentian University. He is now a teacher, artist and cultural consultant in Sudbury, and was seeking a PhD in human studies from Laurentian at the time of the 2008 election. Morin has served on the board of the Sudbury Arts Council, was a founder of the White Mountain Academy of the Arts, and is a strong advocate for local artists. In 2003, he proposed a community arts centre for downtown Sudbury. His own works have been displayed nationally.

He first ran as the party's candidate in Algoma—Manitoulin—Kapuskasing in the 2006 election, and subsequently ran in Sudbury in the 2008 election and the 2011 election. In both 2006 and 2008, Morin was the party's most successful candidate in number of votes received; in 2011, he was the party's only candidate.

Morin was the Eastern Regional Representative for Aboriginal Students with the Canadian Federation of Students while attending university, and became politically active as president of the Young Liberals Association at Cambrian College. He later joined the FPNP, and was nominated as the party's first candidate for public office on December 28, 2005. In 2008, he argued that he was campaigning on a platform of aboriginal values, and fighting for the inclusion of aboriginal people in the political process. During the 2008 election campaign, he was excluded from an all-candidates debate on CIGM, and all four of the major party candidates — Liberal Diane Marleau, Conservative Gerry Labelle, New Democrat Glenn Thibeault and Green Gordon Harris — chose to boycott the debate rather than participate without Morin present. Although he received few votes, he said after the election that he accomplished what he set out to achieve.

In 2006, Morin took part in a protest in support of a road blockade by the members of the Six Nations of the Grand River First Nation in Brant. He later took part in a protest against the Canadian Pacific Spirit Train during the 2008 election. The Spirit Train was intended to raise support for the 2010 Winter Olympics in Vancouver; many protesters argued that the games were taking place on stolen native land.

== Electoral record ==
2011 Canadian federal election
| Party | Candidate | Votes | % | ±% | Expenditures |
|---|---|---|---|---|---|
| New Democratic | Glenn Thibeault | 22,684 | 49.9 | – | – |
| Conservative | Fred Slade | 12,916 | 28.4 | – | – |
| Liberal | Carol Hartman | 8,172 | 18.0 | – | – |
| Green | Frederick Twilley | 1,349 | 3.0 | – | – |
| First Peoples National | Will Morin | 228 | 0.5 | – | – |
| Independent | David Popescu | 116 | 0.3 | – | – |
| Total valid votes | | – | 100.0% | – | |

Source: Elections Canada

2008 Canadian federal election: Sudbury
| Party | Candidate | Votes | % | ±% | Expenditures |
|---|---|---|---|---|---|
| New Democratic | Glenn Thibeault | 15,094 | 35.15 | +3.20 | $71,329 |
| Liberal | Diane Marleau | 12,969 | 30.20 | −11.37 | $50,177 |
| Conservative | Gerry Labelle | 11,073 | 25.79 | +4.11 | $85,730 |
| Green | Gordon Harris | 3,330 | 7.75 | +5.02 | $8,704 |
| First Peoples National | Will Morin | 397 | 0.92 | | $0 |
| Independent | David Popescu | 80 | 0.19 | +0.08 | $148 |
| Total valid votes/expense limit | | 42,943 | 100.00 | $82,461 | |
| Total rejected ballots | | 192 | 0.45 | −0.03 | |
| Turnout | | 43,135 | 58.51 | −7.48 | |
| Electors on the lists | | 73,724 | | | |
Note: italicized expenditure totals refer to data that has not yet been finalized by Elections Canada.

2006 Canadian federal election: Algoma—Manitoulin—Kapuskasing
| Party | Candidate | Votes | % | ±% | Expenditures |
|---|---|---|---|---|---|
| Liberal | Brent St. Denis | 14,652 | 38.18 | −2.76 | $52,836 |
| New Democratic | Carol Hughes | 13,244 | 34.51 | +2.82 | $51,642 |
| Conservative | Ian West | 8,957 | 23.34 | +0.13 | $65,745 |
| Green | Sarah Hutchinson | 1,025 | 2.67 | −1.40 | $647 |
| First Peoples National | Will Morin | 338 | 0.88 | – | $829 |
| Independent | Donald Polmateer | 164 | 0.43 | – | none listed |
| Total valid votes | | 38,380 | 100.00 | | |
| Total rejected ballots | | 216 | 0.56 | | |
| Turnout | | 38,596 | 63.99 | | |
| Electors on the lists | | 60,311 | | | |
Sources: Official Results, Elections Canada and Financial Returns, Elections Canada.
