= Algoma—Manitoulin—Kapuskasing =

Federal electoral district in Ontario, Canada

Ontario electoral district
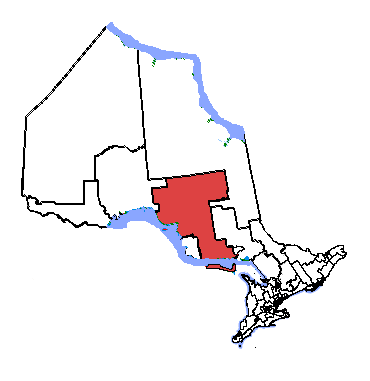
- Coordinates: 46°23′10″N 82°38′54″W; Location of the federal constituency office (as of 7 May 2016)

Defunct federal electoral district
- Legislature: House of Commons
- District created: 2003
- District abolished: 2023
- First contested: 2004
- Last contested: 2021
- District webpage: profile, map

Demographics
- Population (2021): 80,310
- Electors (2021): 66,921
- Area (km²): 92,666.51
- Census division(s): Algoma District, Cochrane District, Manitoulin District, Sudbury District
- Census subdivision(s): Blind River, Chapleau, Elliot Lake, Espanola, Hearst, Kapuskasing, Manitouwadge, Northeastern Manitoulin and the Islands, Sables-Spanish Rivers, Wawa

Algoma—Manitoulin—Kapuskasing was a federal electoral district in Ontario, Canada, that has been represented in the House of Commons of Canada from 2004 until 2023. The area was represented by the riding of Algoma from 1867 to 1904 and from 1968 to 1996 and then by Algoma—Manitoulin from 1996 to 2004. In 2023 the riding was dissolved with parts going to Kapuskasing—Timmins—Mushkegowuk, Sault Ste. Marie—Algoma, Sudbury East—Manitoulin—Nickel Belt, and Thunder Bay—Superior North.

== Demographics ==
According to the 2021 Canadian census

- Languages: 68.7% English, 23.6% French, 1.3% Ojibway, 1.1% German
- Religions: 65.2% Christian (40.5% Catholic, 6.6% United Church, 4.5% Anglican, 1.1% Baptist, 1.1% Pentecostal, 11.4% Other), 1.7% Indigenous Spirituality, 31.7% None
- Median income: $37,200 (2020)
- Average income: $46,520 (2020)

Panethnic groups in Algoma—Manitoulin—Kapuskasing (2011−2021)
| Panethnic group | 2021 | | 2016 | | 2011 | |
| Panethnic group | Pop. | % | Pop. | % | Pop. | % |
|---|---|---|---|---|---|---|
| European (Note: Statistic includes all persons that did not make up part of a visible minority or an indigenous identity.) | 61,675 | 77.98% | 62,255 | 79.6% | 64,285 | 81.48% |
| Indigenous | 15,895 | 20.1% | 14,990 | 19.17% | 13,775 | 17.46% |
| African | 410 | 0.52% | 270 | 0.35% | 275 | 0.35% |
| South Asian | 350 | 0.44% | 145 | 0.19% | 105 | 0.13% |
| East Asian (Note: Statistic includes total responses of "Chinese", "Korean", and "Japanese" under visible minority section on census.) | 300 | 0.38% | 270 | 0.35% | 200 | 0.25% |
| Southeast Asian (Note: Statistic includes total responses of "Filipino" and "Southeast Asian" under visible minority section on census.) | 215 | 0.27% | 85 | 0.11% | 115 | 0.15% |
| Latin American | 55 | 0.07% | 60 | 0.08% | 80 | 0.1% |
| Middle Eastern (Note: Statistic includes total responses of "West Asian" and "Arab" under visible minority section on census.) | 50 | 0.06% | 70 | 0.09% | 0 | 0% |
| Other/multiracial (Note: Statistic includes total responses of "Visible minority, n.i.e." and "Multiple visible minorities" under visible minority section on census.) | 155 | 0.2% | 60 | 0.08% | 50 | 0.06% |
| Total responses | 79,095 | 98.49% | 78,205 | 98.39% | 78,900 | 98.87% |
| Total population | 80,310 | 100% | 79,483 | 100% | 79,801 | 100% |
Notes: Totals greater than 100% due to multiple origin responses. Demographics based on 2012 Canadian federal electoral redistribution riding boundaries.

== Geography ==
The district includes the eastern, northern and central parts of Algoma District, the extreme northwestern part and extreme southwestern part of Sudbury District, the extreme southeastern part of Thunder Bay District, all of Manitoulin District, and western Cochrane District along the Trans Canada highway. Large communities include Elliot Lake, Kapuskasing, Hearst, Espanola, Wawa, Manitouwadge, Blind River, Sables-Spanish Rivers, Chapleau, and Northeastern Manitoulin and the Islands. The area is 103,364 km^{2} (39,909 sq mi).

== History ==
Algoma was created in the British North America Act and consisted of the Provisional Judicial District of Algoma District. In 1882, the district consisted of the area between the Provisional Thunder Bay District and the Province of Manitoba. In 1892, it consisted of all areas of Ontario west of the Nipissing electoral district, and also included Manitoulin Island and the islands around it. The district was abolished in 1903 when it was redistributed into Algoma East and Algoma West ridings.

A new Algoma district was created from Algoma East and Algoma West in 1966. It consisted of most of Algoma District except the extreme north and northwestern portions, and Sault Ste. Marie. It also included Manitoulin Island, nearby islands, and the southwestern corner of Sudbury. In 1976, the district was expanded to the north, and to include the suburbs of Sault Ste. Marie, Whitefish River Indian Reserve, and more of the southwestern part of Sudbury District.

In 1987, it was expanded to include part of the city of Sault Ste. Marie, the part of Rankin Indian Reserve within city limits, more of western Sudbury District, all of Manitoulin District, and much of southcentral Sudbury District. There were also some boundary changes in the north part of the Algoma district.

In 1996, the district consisted of all of Algoma District except Sault Ste. Marie, the northwestern corner and the southwestern corner of Sudbury District, Manitoulin District, and the southeastern corner of Thunder Bay District.

In 1997, the name of the district was changed to Algoma—Manitoulin.

The current electoral district was created in 2003. 71.7% of the population of the riding came from Algoma—Manitoulin, and 28.3% from Timmins-James Bay. Several small parts of the former riding went to Nickel Belt and Sault Ste. Marie ridings.

The riding later gained territory from Sault Ste. Marie and Nickel Belt during the 2012 electoral redistribution.

=== Members of Parliament ===
This riding has elected the following members of Parliament:

| Parliament | Years | Member | Party |
|---|---|---|---|
Algoma
| 1st | 1867–1871 | Wemyss Mackenzie Simpson | Conservative |
| 1st | 1871–1872 | Frederick William Cumberland | Conservative |
| 2nd | 1872–1874 | John Beverley Robinson | Conservative |
| 3rd | 1874–1878 | Edward Borron | Liberal |
| 4th | 1878–1882 | Simon James Dawson | Conservative |
| 5th | 1882–1887 | Simon James Dawson | Conservative |
| 6th | 1887–1891 | Simon James Dawson | Conservative |
| 7th | 1891–1896 | George Hugh Macdonell | Conservative |
| 8th | 1896–1900 | Albert Dyment | Liberal |
| 9th | 1900–1904 | Albert Dyment | Liberal |
Riding dissolved into Algoma East and Algoma West
Algoma; Riding re-created from Algoma East and Algoma West
| 28th | 1968–1972 | Maurice Foster | Liberal |
| 29th | 1972–1974 | Maurice Foster | Liberal |
| 30th | 1974–1979 | Maurice Foster | Liberal |
| 31st | 1979–1980 | Maurice Foster | Liberal |
| 32nd | 1980–1984 | Maurice Foster | Liberal |
| 33rd | 1984–1988 | Maurice Foster | Liberal |
| 34th | 1988–1993 | Maurice Foster | Liberal |
| 35th | 1993–1997 | Brent St. Denis | Liberal |
Algoma—Manitoulin
| 36th | 1997–2000 | Brent St. Denis | Liberal |
| 37th | 2000–2004 | Brent St. Denis | Liberal |
Algoma—Manitoulin—Kapuskasing
| 38th | 2004–2006 | Brent St. Denis | Liberal |
| 39th | 2006–2008 | Brent St. Denis | Liberal |
| 40th | 2008–2011 | Carol Hughes | New Democratic |
| 41st | 2011–2015 | Carol Hughes | New Democratic |
| 42nd | 2015–2019 | Carol Hughes | New Democratic |
| 43rd | 2019–2021 | Carol Hughes | New Democratic |
| 44th | 2021–2025 | Carol Hughes | New Democratic |
Riding dissolved into Kapuskasing—Timmins—Mushkegowuk, Sault Ste. Marie—Algoma, Sudbury East—Manitoulin—Nickel Belt, and Thunder Bay—Superior North

== Election results ==
Graph of election results in Algoma (1966–1997), Algoma—Manitoulin, and Algoma—Manitoulin—Kapuskasing (since 1966, minor parties that never got 2% of the vote or didn't run consistently are omitted) View source data.

=== Algoma—Manitoulin—Kapuskasing (2003–2021) ===
Graph of election results in Algoma—Manitoulin—Kapuskasing (since 2003, minor parties that never got 2% of the vote or didn't run consistently are omitted) View source data.

2021 Canadian federal election
| Party | Candidate | Votes | % | ±% | Expenditures |
|---|---|---|---|---|---|
| New Democratic | Carol Hughes | 15,895 | 40.2 | -1.4 | $79,081.62 |
| Conservative | John Sagman | 10,885 | 27.5 | +1.3 | none listed |
| Liberal | Duke Peltier | 8,888 | 22.5 | -1.8 | $48,545.29 |
| People's | Harry Jaaskelainen | 2,840 | 7.2 | +5.0 | $1,805.85 |
| Green | Stephen Zimmermann | 726 | 1.8 | -3.6 | $42.50 |
| Christian Heritage | Clarence Baarda | 289 | 0.7 | | $9,805.46 |
| Total valid votes | | 39,523 | | | |
| Total rejected ballots | | 291 | | | |
| Turnout | | 39,814 | 59.88 | | |
| Eligible voters | | 66,487 | | | |
| New Democratic hold | | Swing | | -1.35 | |
Source: Elections Canada

2019 Canadian federal election
| Party | Candidate | Votes | % | ±% | Expenditures |
|---|---|---|---|---|---|
| New Democratic | Carol Hughes | 16,883 | 41.59 | +1.67 | $105,479.79 |
| Conservative | Dave Williamson | 10,625 | 26.18 | +2.44 | $58,396.49 |
| Liberal | Heather Wilson | 9,879 | 24.34 | -9.77 | $61,853.69 |
| Green | Max Chapman | 2,192 | 5.40 | +3.16 | none listed |
| People's | Dave Delisle | 887 | 2.19 | | none listed |
| Rhinoceros | Le Marquis de Marmalade | 125 | 0.31 | | $0.00 |
| Total valid votes/expense limit | | 40,591 | 99.06 | | |
| Total rejected ballots | | 384 | 0.94 | +0.55 | |
| Turnout | | 40,975 | 62.17 | -3.49 | |
| Eligible voters | | 65,906 | | | |
| New Democratic hold | | Swing | | -0.38 | |
Source: Elections Canada

2015 Canadian federal election
| Party | Candidate | Votes | % | ±% | Expenditures |
|---|---|---|---|---|---|
| New Democratic | Carol Hughes | 16,516 | 39.92 | −10.01 | $79,801.31 |
| Liberal | Heather Wilson | 14,111 | 34.11 | +19.66 | $36,962.72 |
| Conservative | André Robichaud | 9,820 | 23.73 | −8.77 | $54,344.43 |
| Green | Calvin John Orok | 927 | 2.24 | −0.84 | – |
| Total valid votes/expense limit | | 41,374 | 99.61 | | $247,218.89 |
| Total rejected ballots | | 161 | 0.39 | – | |
| Turnout | | 41,535 | 65.66 | | |
| Eligible voters | | 63,253 | | | |
| New Democratic hold | | Swing | | -14.84 | |
Source: Elections Canada

2011 federal election redistributed results
| Party | Vote | % |
|---|---|---|
| New Democratic | 19,561 | 49.93 |
| Conservative | 12,734 | 32.51 |
| Liberal | 5,660 | 14.45 |
| Green | 1,208 | 3.08 |
| Others | 11 | 0.03 |

2011 Canadian federal election
| Party | Candidate | Votes | % | ±% | Expenditures |
|---|---|---|---|---|---|
| New Democratic | Carol Hughes | 18,747 | 51.73 | +6.24 | – |
| Conservative | Ray Sturgeon | 10,943 | 30.19 | +12.55 | – |
| Liberal | François Cloutier | 5,375 | 14.83 | -17.70 | – |
| Green | Lorraine Rekmans | 1,212 | 3.34 | -0.98 | – |
| Total valid votes/expense limit | | 36,242 | 100.00 | | |
| Total rejected ballots | | 179 | 0.49 | | |
| Turnout | | 36,421 | 62.76 | | |
| New Democratic Party hold | | Swing | -3.2 | | |

2008 Canadian federal election
| Party | Candidate | Votes | % | ±% | Expenditures |
|---|---|---|---|---|---|
| New Democratic | Carol Hughes | 15,249 | 45.49 | +10.98 | $91,893 |
| Liberal | Brent St. Denis | 10,902 | 32.53 | -5.65 | $90,379 |
| Conservative | Dianne Musgrove | 5,914 | 17.64 | -5.70 | $8,989 |
| Green | Lorraine Rekmans | 1,451 | 4.32 | +1.65 | $5,448 |
| Total valid votes/expense limit | | 33,516 | 100.00 | $97,228 | |
| Total rejected ballots | | 175 | 0.52 | | |
| Turnout | | 33,691 | 56.53 | | |
| New Democratic Party gain from Liberal | | Swing | +8.3 | | |

2006 Canadian federal election
| Party | Candidate | Votes | % | ±% | Expenditures |
|---|---|---|---|---|---|
| Liberal | Brent St. Denis | 14,652 | 38.18 | −2.76 | $52,836 |
| New Democratic | Carol Hughes | 13,244 | 34.51 | +2.82 | $51,642 |
| Conservative | Ian West | 8,957 | 23.34 | +0.13 | $65,745 |
| Green | Sarah Hutchinson | 1,025 | 2.67 | −1.40 | $647 |
| First Peoples National | Will Morin | 338 | 0.88 | – | $829 |
| Independent | Donald Polmateer | 164 | 0.43 | – | none listed |
| Total valid votes | | 38,380 | 100.00 | | |
| Total rejected ballots | | 216 | 0.56 | | |
| Turnout | | 38,596 | 63.99 | | |
| Electors on the lists | | 60,311 | | | |
Sources: Official Results, Elections Canada and Financial Returns, Elections Canada.

2004 Canadian federal election
| Party | Candidate | Votes | % |
|---|---|---|---|
| Liberal | Brent St. Denis | 14,276 | 40.94 |
| New Democratic | Carol Hughes | 11,051 | 31.69 |
| Conservative | Blaine Armstrong | 8,093 | 23.21 |
| Green | Lindsay Killen | 1,449 | 4.16 |
| Total | | 34,869 | 100.00 |

=== Algoma—Manitoulin (1997–2003) ===
Graph of election results in Algoma—Manitoulin (1997-2003, minor parties that never got 2% of the vote or didn't run consistently are omitted) View source data.

2000 Canadian federal election
| Party | Candidate | Votes | % |
|---|---|---|---|
| Liberal | Brent St. Denis | 15,000 | 48.36 |
| Alliance | Ron Swain | 8,992 | 28.99 |
| New Democratic | Grant Buck | 4,326 | 13.95 |
| Progressive Conservative | Dale Lapham | 2,269 | 7.32 |
| Green | Alexander Jablanczy | 428 | 1.38 |

1997 Canadian federal election
| Party | Candidate | Votes | % |
|---|---|---|---|
| Liberal | Brent St. Denis | 13,810 | 41.31 |
| Reform | Jim Jeffery | 8,353 | 24.99 |
| New Democratic | Jody Wildman | 7,897 | 23.62 |
| Progressive Conservative | Roseanne MacDonald | 3,367 | 10.07 |

=== Algoma (1966–1997) ===
Graph of election results in Algoma (1966–1997, minor parties that never got 2% of the vote or didn't run consistently are omitted) View source data.

1993 Canadian federal election
| Party | Candidate | Votes | % |
|---|---|---|---|
| Liberal | Brent St. Denis | 18,218 | 58.05 |
| Reform | Ken Leffler | 6,623 | 21.10 |
| Progressive Conservative | David Mair | 3,613 | 11.51 |
| New Democratic | Gayle Erma Broad | 2,696 | 8.59 |
| Natural Law | Bernard Brégaint | 235 | 0.75 |

1988 Canadian federal election
| Party | Candidate | Votes | % |
|---|---|---|---|
| Liberal | Maurice Foster | 16,766 | 53.24 |
| Progressive Conservative | Jim Reed | 7,383 | 23.45 |
| New Democratic | Lloyd Greenspoon | 7,341 | 23.31 |

1984 Canadian federal election
| Party | Candidate | Votes | % |
|---|---|---|---|
| Liberal | Maurice Foster | 14,113 | 38.26 |
| Progressive Conservative | Jim Reed | 12,811 | 34.73 |
| New Democratic | Rocco Frangione | 9,499 | 25.75 |
| Not affiliated | Harold Bruzas | 462 | 1.25 |

1980 Canadian federal election
| Party | Candidate | Votes | % |
|---|---|---|---|
| Liberal | Maurice Foster | 17,432 | 50.54 |
| New Democratic | Jim Dinner | 11,262 | 32.65 |
| Progressive Conservative | Bernt Gilbertson | 5,633 | 16.33 |
| Libertarian | Leslie T. Reid | 113 | 0.33 |
| Marxist–Leninist | David Grey | 49 | 0.14 |
lop.parl.ca

1979 Canadian federal election
| Party | Candidate | Votes | % |
|---|---|---|---|
| Liberal | Maurice Foster | 15,277 | 45.04 |
| New Democratic | Jim Dinner | 10,989 | 32.40 |
| Progressive Conservative | Fred Sagle | 7,531 | 22.20 |
| Marxist–Leninist | Wayne Derrah | 121 | 0.36 |

1974 Canadian federal election
| Party | Candidate | Votes | % |
|---|---|---|---|
| Liberal | Maurice Foster | 11,360 | 52.02 |
| New Democratic | Hughene MacDonald | 5,240 | 24.00 |
| Progressive Conservative | Ron Ritchie | 5,136 | 23.52 |
| Independent | Fernand Trottier | 100 | 0.46 |
Source: Canadian Elections Database

1972 Canadian federal election
| Party | Candidate | Votes | % |
|---|---|---|---|
| Liberal | Maurice Foster | 10,160 | 45.89 |
| Progressive Conservative | Dale Burley | 6,721 | 30.36 |
| New Democratic | Kelly Sweeney | 4,599 | 20.77 |
| Social Credit | Nil F. Cote | 508 | 2.29 |
| Independent | George Washington Strain | 150 | 0.68 |

1968 Canadian federal election
| Party | Candidate | Votes | % |
|---|---|---|---|
| Liberal | Maurice Foster | 9,542 | 50.57 |
| Progressive Conservative | John D. McPhail | 5,270 | 27.93 |
| New Democratic | Len Lefebvre | 4,057 | 21.50 |

=== Algoma (1867–1903) ===
Graph of election results in Algoma (1867–1903, minor parties that never got 2% of the vote or didn't run consistently are omitted) View source data.

1900 Canadian federal election
| Party | Candidate | Votes | % |
|---|---|---|---|
| Liberal | Albert Dyment | 3,083 | 53.09 |
| Conservative | Arthur Cyril Boyce | 2,724 | 46.91 |

1896 Canadian federal election
| Party | Candidate | Votes | % |
|---|---|---|---|
| Liberal | Albert Dyment | 3,176 | 70.19 |
| Conservative | George Hugh Macdonell | 1,349 | 29.81 |

1891 Canadian federal election
| Party | Candidate | Votes | % |
|---|---|---|---|
| Conservative | George Hugh Macdonell | 2,251 | 55.39 |
| Unknown | Daniel F. Burk | 1,813 | 44.61 |

1887 Canadian federal election
| Party | Candidate | Votes | % |
|---|---|---|---|
| Conservative | Simon James Dawson | 1,428 | 50.32 |
| Unknown | Daniel F. Burk | 1,410 | 49.68 |

1882 Canadian federal election
| Party | Candidate | Votes | % |
|---|---|---|---|
| Conservative | Simon James Dawson | 1,707 | 60.55 |
| Liberal | William McDougall | 1,112 | 39.45 |

1878 Canadian federal election
| Party | Candidate | Votes | % |
|---|---|---|---|
| Conservative | Simon James Dawson | 885 | 64.84 |
| Unknown | Mr. Rankin | 480 | 35.16 |
Source: Canadian Elections Database

1874 Canadian federal election
| Party | Candidate | Votes | % |
|---|---|---|---|
| Liberal | Edward Borron | 436 | 61.24 |
| Unknown | W. J. Scott | 258 | 36.24 |
| Unknown | P. J. Brown | 18 | 2.53 |
Source: Canadian Elections Database

1872 Canadian federal election
| Party | Candidate | Votes | % |
|---|---|---|---|
| Conservative | John Beverly Robinson | 300 | 57.80 |
| Unknown | George Taylor Denison III | 219 | 42.20 |
Source: Canadian Elections Database

On Mr. Simpson's resignation to become Indian Commissioner for the North:

By-election on 30 June 1871
| Party | Candidate | Votes |
| Conservative | Frederick William Cumberland | acclaimed |

1867 Canadian federal election
| Party | Candidate | Votes | % |
|---|---|---|---|
| Conservative | Wemyss Mackenzie Simpson | 250 | 47.26 |
| Unknown | William Beatty | 241 | 45.56 |
| Unknown | A. MacDonell | 38 | 7.18 |
| Eligible voters | | 862 | |
Source: Canadian Parliamentary Guide, 1871

== See also ==
- List of Canadian electoral districts
- Historical federal electoral districts of Canada
