= Thunder Bay—Rainy River =

Federal electoral district in Ontario, Canada

Coordinates: 49°50′0″N 91°50′0″W

Ontario electoral district
- Interactive map of riding boundaries from the 2025 federal election. Point indicates the city of Thunder Bay.

Federal electoral district
- Legislature: House of Commons
MP
Marcus Powlowski
Liberal
- District created: 2003
- First contested: 2004
- Last contested: 2021
- District webpage: profile, map

Demographics
- Population (2011): 82,984
- Electors (2015): 62,207
- Area (km²): 39,545
- Pop. density (per km²): 2.1
- Census division(s): Thunder Bay District, Rainy River District
- Census subdivision(s): Thunder Bay (part), Fort Frances, Oliver Paipoonge, Atikokan, Neebing, Emo, Fort William, Alberton, Conmee, La Vallee

Thunder Bay—Rainy River is a federal electoral district in Ontario, Canada, that has been represented in the House of Commons of Canada since 2004. It first elected a member in the 2004 federal election.

== History ==
It was created in 2003 from parts of Kenora—Rainy River and Thunder Bay—Atikokan ridings.

This riding gained a fraction of territory from Thunder Bay—Superior North during the 2012 electoral redistribution.

== Geography ==
It consists of the Territorial District of Rainy River and part of Thunder Bay south and west of a line running from the western limit, east along the 6th Base Line, south along Dog River and the Kaministiquia River, ending at the City of Thunder Bay’s eastern limit and the US border.

== Demographics ==
According to the 2021 Canadian census

Ethnic groups: 76.4% White, 18.8% Indigenous, 1.5% South Asian

Languages: 89.4% English, 1.6% French, 1.1% Italian

Religions: 54.1% Christian (26.2% Catholic, 5.9% United Church, 4.7% Anglican, 3.2% Lutheran, 1.6% Baptist, 1.5% Presbyterian, 11.0% other), 1.8% Indigenous spirituality, 42.0% none

Median income: $42,800 (2020)

Average income: $50,520 (2020)

== Riding associations ==
Riding associations are the local branches of political parties:

Party	Association name	President	HQ city
Conservative	Thunder Bay--Rainy River Conservative Association	Linda R. Rydholm	Thunder Bay
Liberal	Thunder Bay--Rainy River Federal Liberal Association	Stephen Margarit	Thunder Bay
New Democratic	Thunder Bay--Rainy River Federal NDP Riding Association	Yuk-Sem Won	Thunder Bay
People's	Thunder Bay PPC Regional District Association	James Berday	Nipigon

== Member of Parliament ==
This riding has elected the following members of Parliament:

Parliament	Years	Member	Party
Thunder Bay—Rainy River; Riding created from Kenora—Rainy River and Thunder Bay—Atikokan
38th	2004–2006	Ken Boshcoff	Liberal
39th	2006–2008	Ken Boshcoff	Liberal
40th	2008–2011	John Rafferty	New Democratic
41st	2011–2015	John Rafferty	New Democratic
42nd	2015–2019	Don Rusnak	Liberal
43rd	2019–2021	Marcus Powlowski	Liberal
44th	2021–2025	Marcus Powlowski	Liberal
45th	2025–present	Marcus Powlowski	Liberal

== Election results ==
Graph of election results in Thunder Bay—Rainy River (minor parties that never got 2% of the vote or didn't run consistently are omitted)

2025 Canadian federal election
Party	Candidate	Votes	%	±%	Expenditures
Liberal	Marcus Powlowski	21,125	48.5	+14.2	
Conservative	Brendan Hyatt	18,685	42.9	+13.6	
New Democratic	Yuk-Sem Won	2,954	6.8	–21.7	
People's	Sabrina Ree	433	1.0	–5.6	
Green	Eric Arner	334	0.8	–0.6	
Total valid votes/expense limit					
Total rejected ballots					
Turnout		43,531	66.5		
Eligible voters		65,412			
Liberal hold		Swing			
Source: Elections Canada

2021 Canadian federal election
Party	Candidate	Votes	%	±%	Expenditures
Liberal	Marcus Powlowski	13,655	34.3	-1.0	$85,082.79
Conservative	Adelina Pecchia	11,671	29.3	0.0	$27,004.63
New Democratic	Yuk-Sem Won	11,342	28.5	-0.6	$82,351.30
People's	Alan Aubut	2,621	6.6	+4.8	$0.00
Green	Tracey MacKinnon	571	1.4	-3.1	$287.74
Total valid votes		39,860			
Total rejected ballots		308			
Turnout		40,168	61.69		
Eligible voters		65,109			
Source: Elections Canada

2019 Canadian federal election
Party	Candidate	Votes	%	±%	Expenditures
Liberal	Marcus Powlowski	14,498	35.32	-8.70	$55,609.36
Conservative	Linda Rydholm	12,039	29.33	+8.24	$50,919.61
New Democratic	Yuk-Sem Won	11,944	29.10	-0.57	none listed
Green	Amanda Moddejonge	1,829	4.46	-0.77	none listed
People's	Andrew Hartnell	741	1.81	–	none listed
Total valid votes/expense limit		41,051	99.20		
Total rejected ballots		333	0.80	+0.39	
Turnout		41,384	62.41	-3.92	
Eligible voters		66,306			
Liberal hold		Swing		-8.47	
Source: Elections Canada

2015 Canadian federal election
Party	Candidate	Votes	%	±%	Expenditures
Liberal	Don Rusnak	18,523	44.02	+22.31	$69,724.11
New Democratic	John Rafferty	12,483	29.66	-18.99	$106,616.41
Conservative	Moe Comuzzi	8,876	21.09	-6.12	$64,890.91
Green	Christy Radbourne	2,201	5.23	+2.79	$3,586.52
Total valid votes/expense limit		42,083	99.58		$233,739.33
Total rejected ballots		176	0.42	–	
Turnout		42,259	66.33		
Eligible voters		63,708			
Liberal gain from New Democratic		Swing		+20.65	
Source: Elections Canada

2011 federal election redistributed results
Party	Vote	%
New Democratic	18,126	48.65
Conservative	10,138	27.21
Liberal	8,085	21.70
Green	911	2.44
Others	1	0.00

2011 Canadian federal election
Party	Candidate	Votes	%	±%	Expenditures
New Democratic	John Rafferty	18,085	48.7	+8.4	–
Conservative	Maureen Comuzzi-Stehmann	10,097	27.2	+3.6	–
Liberal	Ken Boshcoff	8,067	21.7	-10.6	–
Green	Ed Shields	909	2.4	-1.4	–
Total valid votes/expense limit		37,158	100.0		
Total rejected ballots		130	0.3	–	
Turnout		37,288	60.1	–	
Eligible voters		62,018	–	–	
New Democratic hold		Swing		+2.4	

2008 Canadian federal election
Party	Candidate	Votes	%	±%	Expenditures
New Democratic	John Rafferty	14,478	40.3	+6.9	$80,937
Liberal	Ken Boshcoff	11,589	32.3	-2.8	$63,482
Conservative	Richard Neumann	8,466	23.6	-3.6	$44,136
Green	Russ Aegard	1,377	3.8	+0.7	$1,292
Total valid votes/expense limit		35,910	100.0		$93,852
Total rejected ballots		105			
Turnout		36,015	57.05		
Eligible voters		63,128			
New Democratic gain from Liberal		Swing		+4.85	
Source: Elections Canada

2006 Canadian federal election
Party	Candidate	Votes	%	±%
Liberal	Ken Boshcoff	13,520	35.1	-4.3
New Democratic	John Rafferty	12,862	33.4	+3.7
Conservative	David Leskowski	10,485	27.2	+0.9
Green	Russ Aegard	1,193	3.1	+0.7
Marijuana	Doug MacKay	424	1.1	-0.4
Total valid votes		38,484	100.0	
Total rejected ballots		134		
Turnout		36,618	57.96	
Eligible voters		63,180		
Liberal hold		Swing		-4.00
Source: Elections Canada

2004 Canadian federal election
Party	Candidate	Votes	%
Liberal	Ken Boshcoff	14,290	39.4
New Democratic	John Rafferty	10,781	29.7
Conservative	David Leskowski	9,559	26.3
Green	Russ Aegard	856	2.4
Marijuana	Doug Thompson	547	1.5
Christian Heritage	Johannes Scheibler	267	0.7
Total valid votes		36,300	100.0
Total rejected ballots		162	
Turnout		36,462	57.22
Eligible voters		63,718	
Source: Elections Canada

== See also ==
- List of Canadian electoral districts
- Historical federal electoral districts of Canada
