= Marcus Powlowski =

Canadian politician (born 1960)

Marcus Powlowski MP
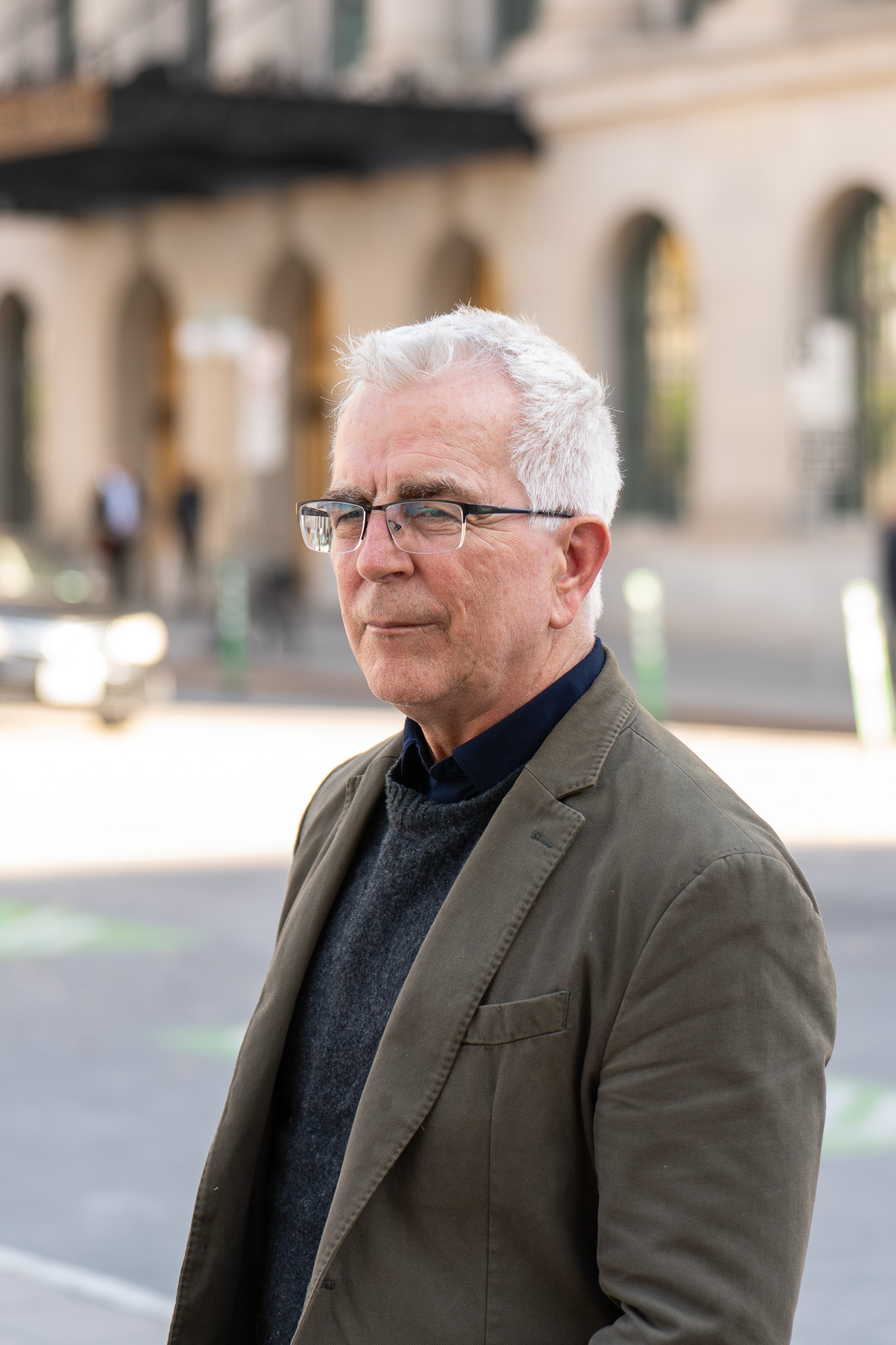

Member of Parliament for Thunder Bay—Rainy River
- Incumbent
- Assumed office October 21, 2019
- Preceded by: Don Rusnak

Personal details
- Born: January 20, 1960 (age 66) Fort William, Ontario, Canada
- Party: Liberal Party of Canada
- Spouse: Mirasol Añora-Powlowski
- Children: 6
- Education: University of Toronto (BSc, LLB, MD); Harvard University (MPH); Georgetown University (LLM)
- Website: https://www.marcuspowlowskimp.ca

Marcus Powlowski (born January 20, 1960) is a Canadian doctor and politician who has served as Member of Parliament (MP) for the riding of Thunder Bay—Rainy River since 2019. Powlowski is a member of the Liberal Party of Canada.

Originally from Kaministiquia, Ontario, Powlowski holds five degrees, from the University of Toronto, Harvard University, and Georgetown University, and is a medical doctor. During his tenure in Parliament, Powlowski has co-chaired the Special Joint Committee on Medical Assistance in Dying, sat on the Standing Committee on Public Safety and National Security, sat on the Standing Committee on Health, and has split time on the Standing Committee on National Defence and the Standing Committee on Indigenous and Northern Affairs. He was re-elected in the 2021 election, and again in the 2025 election.

== Early life, education, and medical career ==
Born in Fort William, Ontario, on January 20, 1960, the son of Peter and Liz Powlowski, owners of the Strawberry Hill pottery workshop in Thunder Bay. He is of Ukrainian ancestry, his paternal grandparents immigrated from Ukraine to Thunder Bay, where Powlowski's grandmother ran Annie’s Confectionary on East Brock Street in Fort William for over 60 years. In 1978, Powlowski graduated from Hillcrest High School.

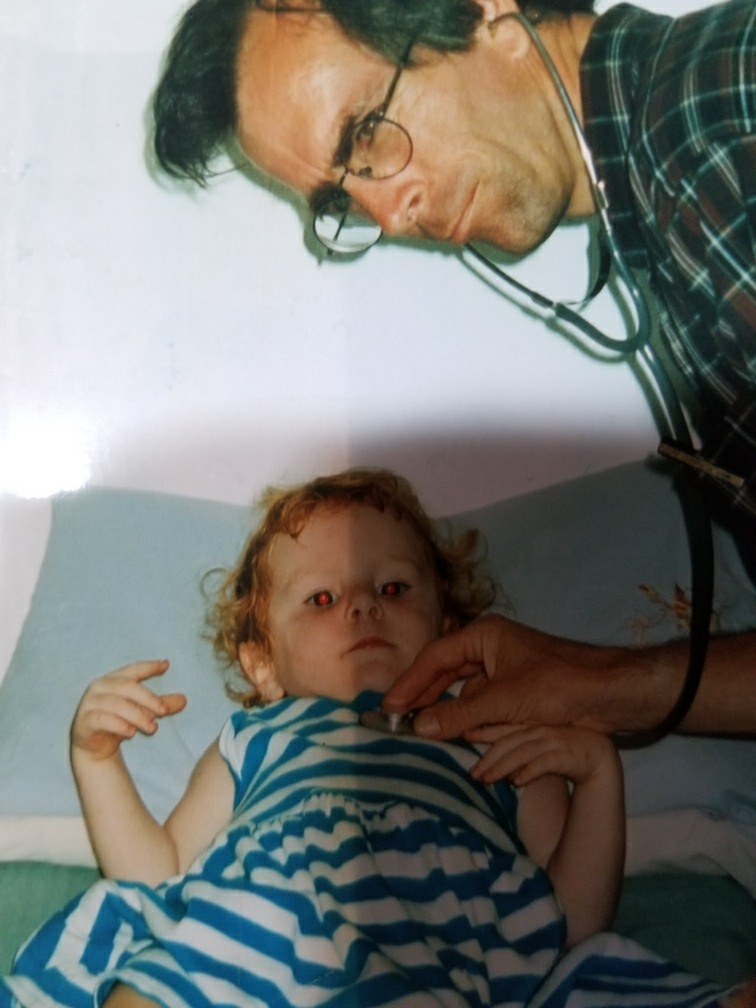
Powlowski in the 1990s

In 1982, Powlowski received his Bachelor of Science in Biochemistry, from the University of Toronto. This would be followed by a Doctor of Medicine degree in 1986, and a Bachelor of Laws (LLB) degree in 1997, also from the University of Toronto. In 2004, Powlowski graduated with a Master's degree in Public Health from Harvard University, and in 2008 graduated with a Master of Laws (LLM) degree from Georgetown University.

After graduating with his M.D., Powlowski practiced medicine for seven years in Swaziland, The Gambia, Papua New Guinea, and Vanuatu, working for local wages. Returning to Canada, Powlowski worked for two years in Norway House Cree Nation in Northern Manitoba before returning to Thunder Bay to work as an Emergency Room physician at the Thunder Bay Regional Health Sciences Centre. He has also worked for the World Health Organization as a health legislation consultant and taught Global Health and Global Health Law at Lakehead University and the University of San Francisco.

== Political career ==
Elections

Powlowski was elected as the Member of Parliament (MP) for Thunder Bay—Rainy River in 2019, representing the Liberal Party of Canada. He succeeded Don Rusnak, who did not seek re-election. Powlowski's campaign focused on healthcare reform, economic development for Northwestern Ontario, and environmental protection. He defeated Conservative Linda Rydholm with 35.3% of the vote to 29.3%. Powlowski won re-election in the 2021 election, defeating Conservative Adelina Pecchia with 34.3% of the vote, to 29.3%. In the 2025 General Election Powlowski won re-election, defeating Conservative Brendan Hyatt with 48.5% of the vote, to 42.9%.

Political positions

Healthcare

Powlowski's background as a physician has featured prominently in his political career. During the COVID-19 pandemic, he emerged as a leading voice in Canada's response. The Hill Times named Powlowski as one of the 25 MPs to watch during the Fall 2020 session of Parliament because of his work on public health during the pandemic. Powlowski notably advocated for the use of human challenge trials to accelerate vaccine development and criticized the government's initial handling of personal protective equipment shortages.

Outside of the pandemic, he led an effort to address the physician shortage in rural communities, including by streamlining the process for licensing foreign-trained doctors through changes to practice ready assessments, increasing physician residency positions in rural areas, and introducing financial incentives for doctors to practice in underserved communities.

Medical assistance in dying

In 2022, Powlowski lobbied against the expansion of medical assistance in dying (MAiD) to include cases where mental illness is the sole underlying condition. He called for additional safeguards and a more cautious approach to implementation. MAID in cases where mental illness is the sole underlying condition is currently not allowed in Canada, and regulations are on-hold until at least 2027.

Economic development

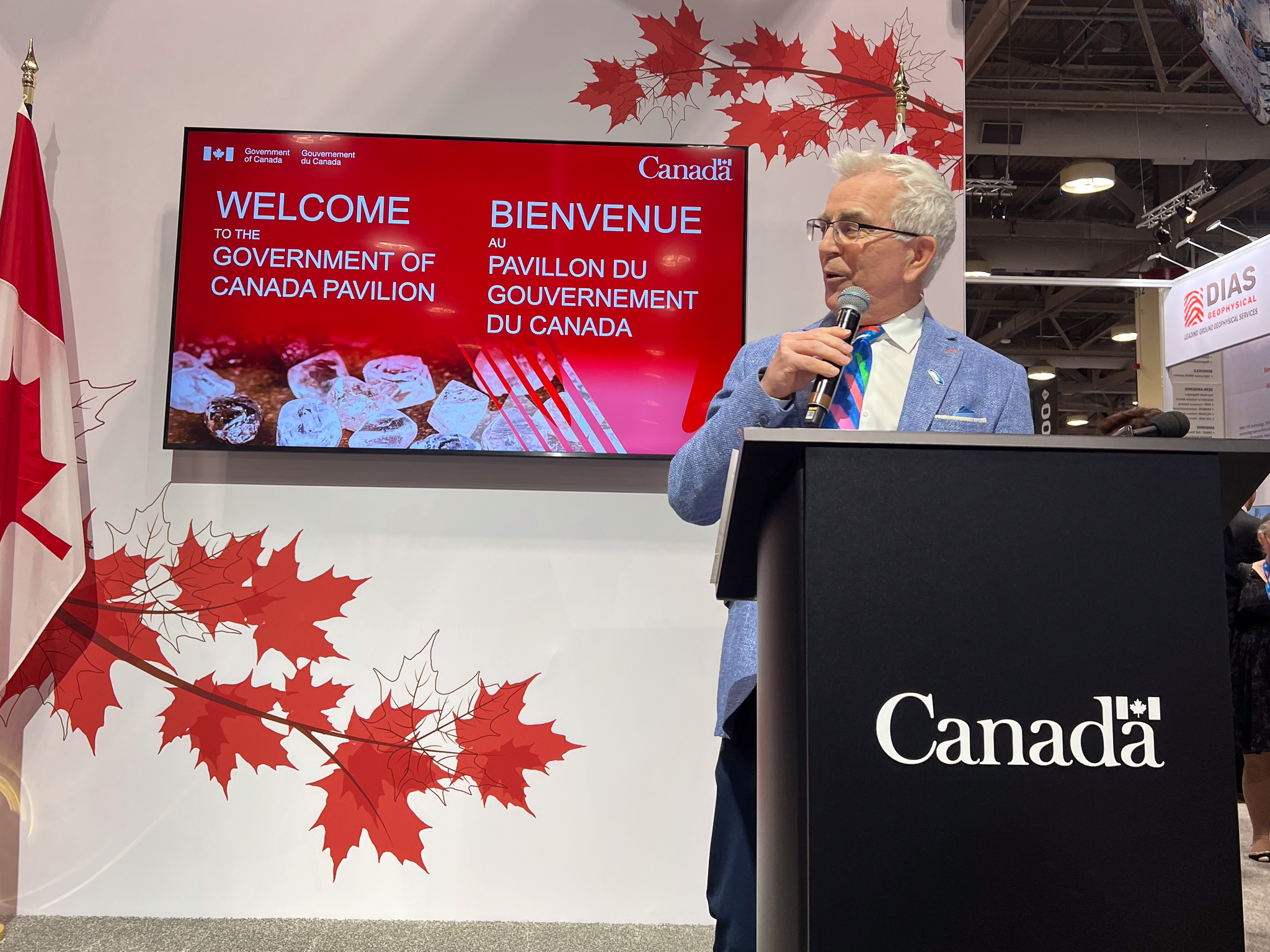
Powlowski at PDAC 2025

Powlowski has been an advocate for industrial development in Northwestern Ontario. He has played a significant role in supporting Thunder Bay’s Alstom plant, an important employer in Thunder Bay, including by securing federal funding for a streetcar project in 2021 and the TTC Line 2 subway car replacement in 2024.

Powlowski has advocated for making Northwestern Ontario a central hub in Canada’s transition to a green economy. He has advocated for investments in lithium manufacturing, aiming to transform the region into a leader in the electric vehicle (EV) and battery supply chain. These efforts culminated in the 2025 announcement that the Federal Government and the Government of Ontario would invest up to $120 million each in a new lithium refinery project in Thunder Bay.

Since 2019, Thunder Bay—Rainy River has received over $350 million in committed federal funding, which has contributed to economic revitalization of the area following the pandemic.

Rural issues

Powlowski has advocated for infrastructure projects in rural Northwestern Ontario. Projects that Powlowski has claimed credit for include the construction of bridges and roads to Northern communities.

Public safety

Powlowski has been an advocate for increasing patrols and modernizing fishing regulations in boundary waters. He was an important part of the effort to bring an RCMP presence back to Fort Frances, and has pushed for greater federal policing presence across Northwestern Ontario.

His advocacy has led to increased funding for police services in his riding, including securing “guns and gangs” funding for the Thunder Bay Police and Nishnawbe Aski Police. Powlowski has been a vocal supporter of Indigenous policing initiatives.

Environmental advocacy

Powlowski has advocated for reducing carbon emissions, promoting renewable energy, and sustainable natural resource policies. His support for initiatives like the Freshwater Action Plan and efforts to preserve Canada’s lakes and rivers are examples of his environmental advocacy.

Foreign policy

In 2021, Powlowski was heavily involved in advocating for the rescue of Afghan interpreters during the fall of Kabul during Canada's involvement in the War in Afghanistan. He also worked since 2022 as a part of an all-party group of MPs who have brought Afghan woman MPs to Canada.

In the wake of Russia’s invasion of Ukraine, Powlowski has been an outspoken supporter of Canada’s support of Ukraine. He has called for increased military aid, including advanced defense systems, and has been a vocal proponent of holding Russia accountable for its actions in international courts. Beyond military assistance, he has worked to settle Ukrainian refugees in Canada and has been a strong advocate for providing long-term support for rebuilding Ukraine after the war. In 2025, Powlowski suggested Canada send a peacekeeping force to Ukraine after a settlement had been reached.

Private member's bill

Powlowski advocated for a crackdown against forced labour in supply chains. In 2022, he drafted a private member's bill that was merged with Bill S-211: Fighting Against Forced Labour and Child Labour in Supply Chains Act. In 2026, he drafted C-265: An Act to amend the Food and Drugs Act (List of Therapeutic Products Pre-approved for Special Access).

Committee assignments and caucus memberships

Powlowski has been an active member of several parliamentary committees and caucuses:

- Special Joint Standing on Medical Assistance in Dying
- Standing Committee on Public Safety and National Security
- Standing Committee on Health
- Standing Committee on National Defence
- Standing Committee on Indigenous and Northern Affairs
- Northern Ontario Liberal Caucus
- Ontario Liberal Caucus
- Rural Liberal Caucus
- International Human Rights Caucus
- Ukrainian-Canadian Friendship Group
- Canada-Africa Parliamentary Association
- Canada-Ireland Interparliamentary Group
- Canada-Japan Inter-Parliamentary Group
- Canadian NATO Parliamentary Association
- Canadian Branch of the Assemblée parlementaire de la Francophonie
- Canadian Branch of the Commonwealth Parliamentary Association
- Canada-United States Inter-Parliamentary Group
- Canadian Section of ParlAmericas
- Canada-United Kingdom Inter-Parliamentary Association

== Electoral record ==
2025 Canadian federal election: Thunder Bay—Rainy River
Party	Candidate	Votes	%	±%	Expenditures
Liberal	Marcus Powlowski	21,125	48.5	+14.2	
Conservative	Brendan Hyatt	18,685	42.9	+13.6	
New Democratic	Yuk-Sem Won	2,954	6.8	–21.7	
People's	Sabrina Ree	433	1.0	–5.6	
Green	Eric Arner	334	0.8	–0.6	
Total valid votes/expense limit					
Total rejected ballots					
Turnout		43,531	66.5		
Eligible voters		65,412			
Liberal hold		Swing			
Source: Elections Canada

2021 Canadian federal election
Party	Candidate	Votes	%	±%	Expenditures
Liberal	Marcus Powlowski	13,655	34.3	-1.0	$85,082.79
Conservative	Adelina Pecchia	11,671	29.3	0.0	$27,004.63
New Democratic	Yuk-Sem Won	11,342	28.5	-0.6	$82,351.30
People's	Alan Aubut	2,621	6.6	+4.8	$0.00
Green	Tracey MacKinnon	571	1.4	-3.1	$287.74
Total valid votes		39,860			
Total rejected ballots		308			
Turnout		40,168	61.69		
Eligible voters		65,109			
Source: Elections Canada

2019 Canadian federal election: Thunder Bay—Rainy River
Party	Candidate	Votes	%	±%	Expenditures
Liberal	Marcus Powlowski	14,498	35.32	-8.70	$55,609.36
Conservative	Linda Rydholm	12,039	29.33	+8.24	$50,919.61
New Democratic	Yuk-Sem Won	11,944	29.10	-0.57	none listed
Green	Amanda Moddejonge	1,829	4.46	-0.77	none listed
People's	Andrew Hartnell	741	1.81	–	none listed
Total valid votes/expense limit		41,051	99.20		
Total rejected ballots		333	0.80	+0.39	
Turnout		41,384	62.41	-3.92	
Eligible voters		66,306			
Liberal hold		Swing		-8.47	
Source: Elections Canada
