= First Peoples National Party of Canada =

- Defunct federal party
- Leader: Will Morin (interim)
- Founded: 2004
- Dissolved: 2013
- Headquarters: 242 St. George Street, Sudbury, Ontario
- Ideology: Indigenous rights

Website
- www.fpnpoc.ca

The First Peoples National Party of Canada (FPNPC) was a federal political party in Canada. Focused on Indigenous rights advocacy, it sought to increase the number of Indigenous people involved in the federal electoral process and engage the public on Indigenous issues, while it also nominated candidates for election in electoral districts with large Aboriginal populations. The party ran candidates in three federal elections between 2006 and 2011. The party was voluntarily deregistered by Elections Canada on July 5, 2013, with then-leader Will Morin asserting that the party's purpose had been supplanted by the emergence of the Idle No More activist movement.

== Background ==
The FPNPC held its first organizational meeting in October 2004 in Sault Ste. Marie, Ontario. The similarly-minded Aboriginal Peoples Party of Canada began organizing independently in the summer of 2005. Although the parties contrasted somewhat in their desire to work closely with or at arm's length from national aboriginal organizations such as the Assembly of First Nations, it was believed that the two parties merged their applications for registration to facilitate gaining Elections Canada recognition. One of the conditions of that agreement was a national convention in which the party's name would be put to the membership for a vote.

In the fall of 2005, the FPNP filed its application for registration as a political party. The party nominated five candidates in Alberta, British Columbia and Ontario in the 2006 federal election. On December 26, 2005, Will Morin, an Ojibway from Michipicoten First Nation was the first of the five candidates to be officially registered by Elections Canada. This registration, during a federal election, made the FPNP an official political party.

Barbara Wardlaw, an Ojibwa from the Michipicoten First Nation near Sault Ste. Marie, served as the party's interim leader in the 2006 and 2008 elections. She was succeeded by Will Morin, who also served as leader on an interim basis. Morin was the party's only candidate in the 2011 election, receiving 0.50 percent of the votes in the riding of Sudbury.

== Election results ==
Election	# of candidates	# of votes	% of popular vote	% in ridings contested
2006	5	1,201	0.008%	0.557%
2008	6	1,611	0.012%	0.962%
2011	1	229	0.002%	0.504%

Election	Candidate	Riding	# of votes	% of popular vote
2006	Doug Dokis	Calgary Centre-North	206	0.37
2006	Guy Dumas	Sault Ste. Marie	225	0.49
2006	John Malcolm	Fort McMurray—Athabasca	337	1.38
2006	Will Morin	Algoma—Manitoulin—Kapuskasing	338	0.88
2006	Don Roberts	Cariboo—Prince George	95	0.22
2008	Rob Ballantyne	Desnethé—Missinippi—Churchill River	282	1.47
2008	John Malcolm	Fort McMurray—Athabasca	244	0.91
2008	Cory McLeod	Sault Ste. Marie	235	0.57
2008	Will Morin	Sudbury	397	0.92
2008	Lyle Morrisseau	Winnipeg Centre	212	0.84
2008	Noeline Villebrun	Western Arctic	252	1.84
2011	Will Morin	Sudbury	229	0.50

== See also ==
- List of political parties in Canada
