= 2017 Conservative Party of Canada leadership election =

Party election in Canada

2017 Conservative leadership election
- May 27, 2017
- Opinion polls
- Turnout: 54.57%
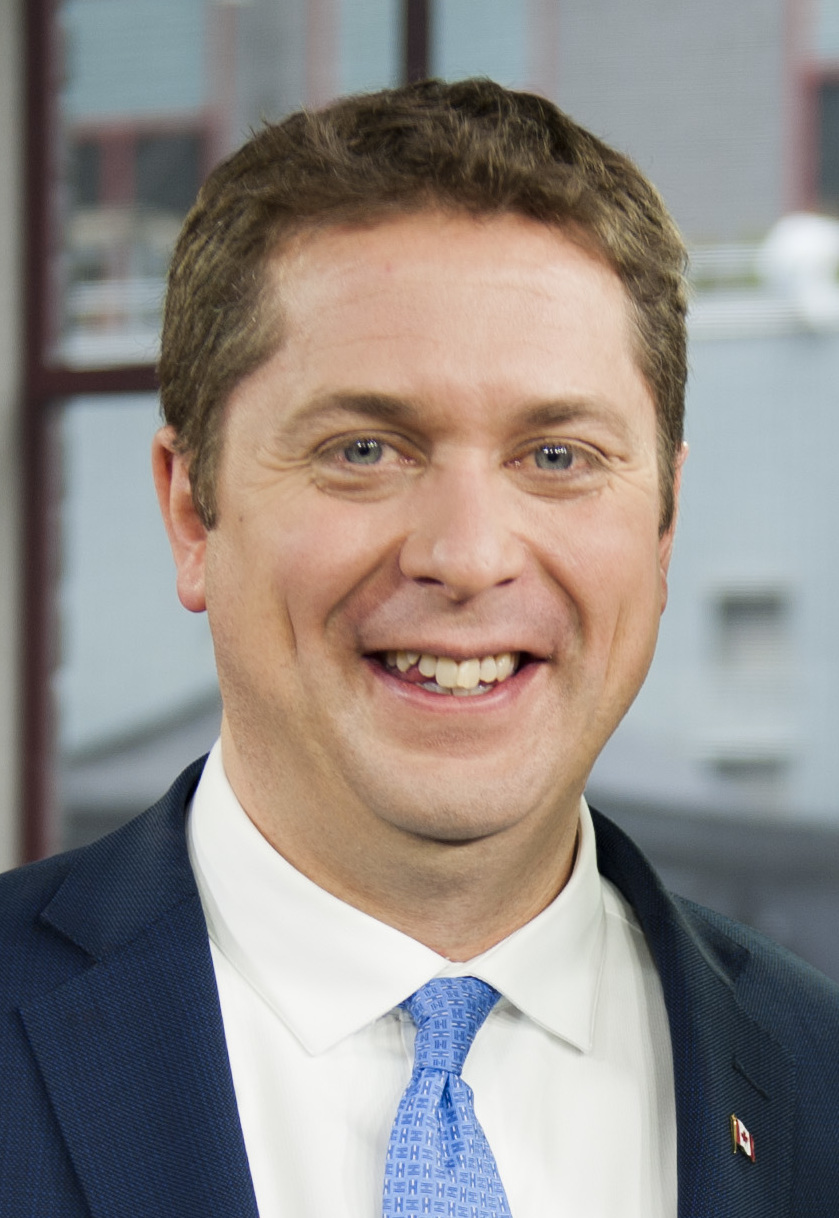

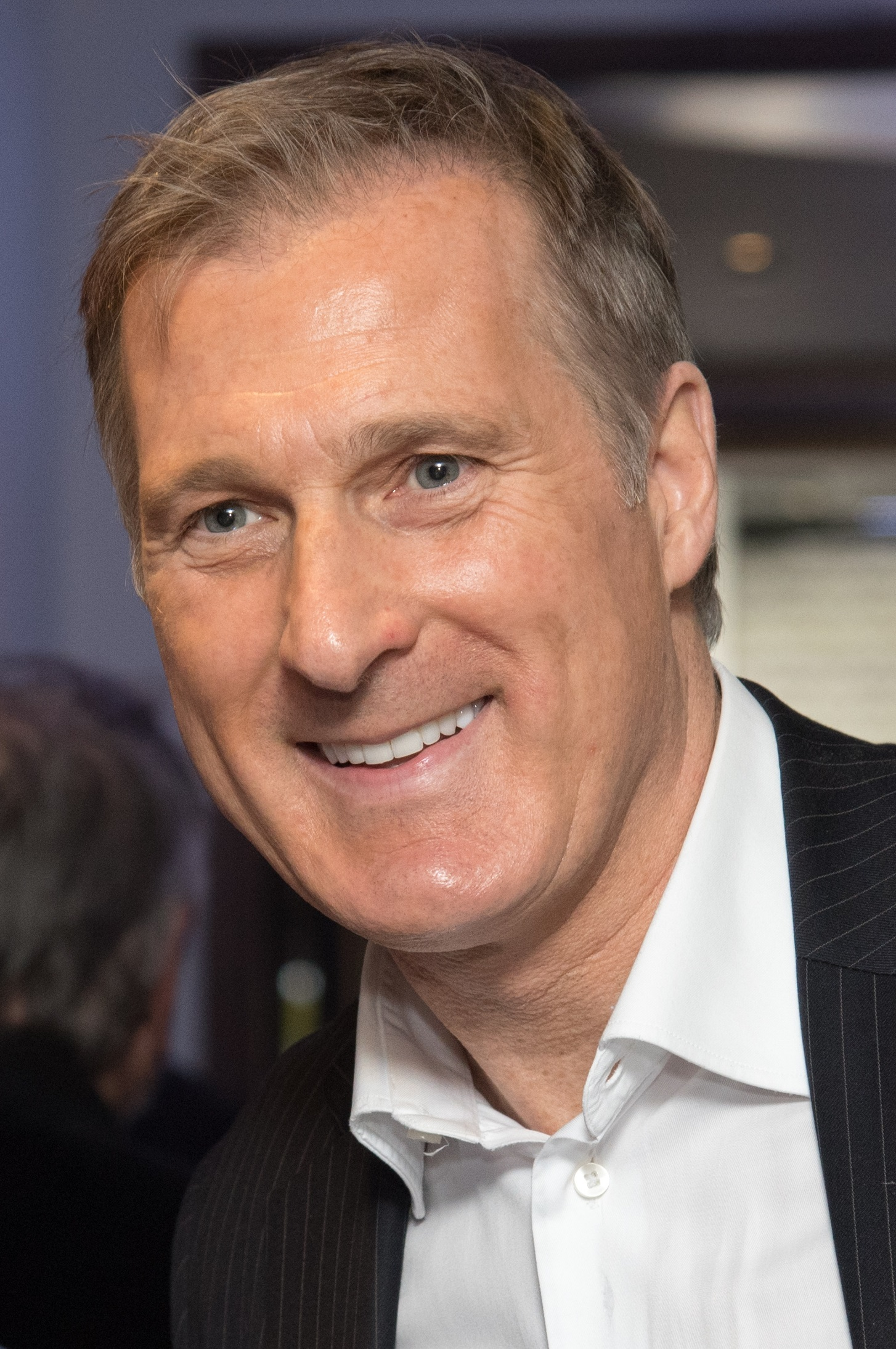

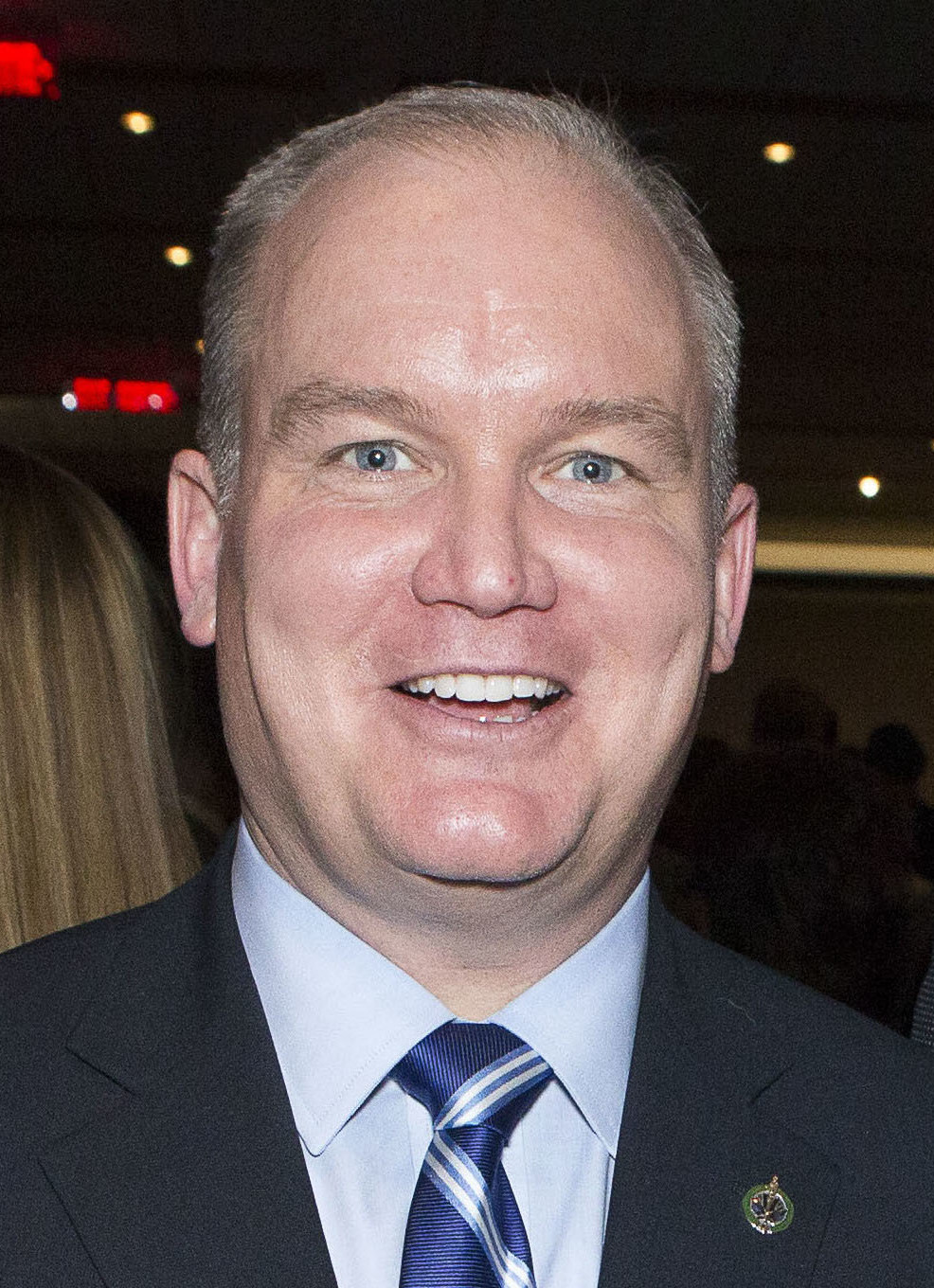
Candidate	Andrew Scheer	Maxime Bernier	Erin O'Toole
Final ballot	17,222 pts (50.95%)	16,578 pts (49.05%)	Eliminated
First ballot	7,376 pts (21.82%)	9,763 pts (28.89%)	3,601 pts (10.65%)
Leader before election
Rona Ambrose (interim)
Elected Leader
Andrew Scheer

2017 Conservative leadership election
- Date: May 27, 2017
- Convention: Toronto Congress Centre, Toronto
- Resigning leader: Stephen Harper
- Won by: Andrew Scheer
- Candidates: 13
- Entrance fee: C$100,000 ($50,000 of which is a refundable compliance deposit)
- Spending limit: C$5,000,000

The Conservative Party of Canada held a leadership election on May 27, 2017. The leadership election was prompted by the resignation of Stephen Harper, who had led the Conservative Party of Canada as its leader from 2004, after the party's defeat in the 2015 election.

Thirteen candidates entered the contest: Chris Alexander, Maxime Bernier, Steven Blaney, Michael Chong, Kellie Leitch, Pierre Lemieux, Deepak Obhrai, Erin O'Toole, Rick Peterson, Lisa Raitt, Andrew Saxton, Andrew Scheer and Brad Trost. Additionally, four other candidates withdrew, including Kevin O'Leary, who remained on the final ballot.

Voting was conducted using a ranked ballot; however votes were calculated so that each electoral district had equal weight with each electoral district allocated 100 points. 259,010 party members were eligible to vote in the leadership contest. 141,000 members cast a vote.

Andrew Scheer was elected leader on the thirteenth ballot, narrowly defeating second-place finisher Maxime Bernier. Many considered Scheer's victory as an upset, given Bernier's consistent frontrunner status in the polls.

== History ==
=== Background ===
Stephen Harper, who led the Conservative Party of Canada as its leader from 2004 following the merger of the Canadian Alliance and Progressive Conservative parties, led the party through five federal elections: the party increased its seat count in the House of Commons in 2004, formed two minority governments in 2006, and 2008, and then a majority government in 2011. Following the defeat of the party in the 2015 federal election on October 19, Harper tendered his resignation as party leader. In a statement, Conservative Party President John Walsh said he had spoken to Harper, "and he has instructed me to reach out to the newly elected parliamentary caucus to appoint an interim Leader and to implement the leadership selection process."

=== Interim leadership ===
Conservative Party president John Walsh's letter to caucus stated that only Members of Parliament (MPs) would vote for the interim leader, but Conservative Senators pointed out that the party constitution states that the entire parliamentary caucus votes. The caucus allowed senators to vote, declining to adopt the provisions of the Reform Act that would have only allowed MPs to vote.

The caucus chose Rona Ambrose, MP for Sturgeon River—Parkland, Alberta and former Minister of Health, as interim leader at its first meeting on November 5, 2015, in a vote by preferential ballot. Ambrose, as the interim leader, also served as Leader of the Official Opposition in the Parliament of Canada until a permanent leader was chosen. She defeated Candice Bergen, Diane Finley, Mike Lake, Rob Nicholson, Erin O'Toole, and the joint ticket of Denis Lebel and Michelle Rempel in the caucus vote.

Under the party's constitution, Ambrose, as the interim leader, could not run for the permanent position.

=== Leadership election timing ===
Following Harper's resignation, debate emerged within the Conservative Party regarding the timing of the leadership election. Some members of the party's national council called for a leadership convention as early as May 2016 according to Maclean's magazine. However, interim leader Rona Ambrose said there was a consensus among the party's caucus that the leadership election should not be rushed and should be held sometime in 2017. In a December 2015 interview, Ambrose said the party would take its time allowing all members, including those not already involved in politics, to build a strong candidacy. "If we take a little extra time, that will mean we'll have a better leadership race."

The Conservative Party's Leadership Election Organizing Committee (LEOC) met at Toronto's Albany Club January 15–17, 2016 to discuss the process for the Party to elect its next leader. Among its decisions, LEOC selected May 27, 2017, for Conservative Party members to elect their next leader.

=== Aftermath ===
Subsequent to the election, fourth placed candidate Brad Trost and his campaign were fined $50,000 by the Conservative Party of Canada for allegedly leaking the party's membership list to the National Firearms Association. Trost denied that he or any of his staff leaked the list. On February 11, 2019, the Conservative Party released a statement from its Leadership Election Organizing Committee (LEOC) which concluded: "In short, LEOC does not believe there is evidence that the Trost Campaign was responsible for leaking of the membership list...." The fine was therefore removed from the Brad Trost Campaign. Trost went on to lose renomination as the party candidate for his riding during the 43rd Federal election on March 10, 2018, to Corey Tochor, former speaker of the Saskatchewan Legislature.

Criticism has been raised about how the party memberships were handled, with some prominent members saying they never received a ballot, even after contacting the party about it.

In addition, the result of the leadership race and party handling was questioned by some supporters of such as runner-up Maxime Bernier and fifth place candidate Kellie Leitch due to discrepancies in the final ballot count, specifically a gap between the number of ballots cast and the announced result – a 7,466 vote discrepancy, which is greater than Andrew Scheer's 7,049 votes margin of victory in the final round. There was criticism over the exact role of the accounting firm Deloitte during the voting process – a deal revealed that Deloitte was not specifically tasked with auditing the vote but "observe" the counting process. It was also reported that some of Brad Trost's supporters contravened the Elections Act and party membership rules by offering incentives to vote. Dimitri Soudas, a former Stephen Harper aide, pointed out that it violated election rules and it benefited Scheer's campaign but the ballots have been destroyed so the results stood.

== Rules and voting system ==
Only party members in good standing at 5pm Eastern Time on March 28, 2017, were allowed to vote. The fee for a party membership was raised from $15 to $25, an increase that was reversed on April 23, 2016, after criticisms that the move was "elitist". Membership fees could only be paid via personal cheque or credit card. Cash payments were not permitted. This new requirement was intended to prevent the election being dominated by new members, and to prevent anyone other than the individual member, such as a candidate's campaign, from signing up scores of members and paying the membership fees in cash out of campaign funds. Despite this, the Conservative Party confirmed irregularities with 1,351 memberships connected to prepaid credit cards that it subsequently struck from its membership roll.

Voting was on a one member one vote basis using a ranked ballot; however votes were calculated so that each electoral district had equal weight with each electoral district allocated 100 points. Candidates were assigned a point total based on his or her percentage of the vote in each electoral district. To win, a candidate must receive at least 16,901 points which would be a majority.

To register, candidates must:

- be members of the party for at least six months (can be waived),
- submit nomination forms signed by 300 party members from at least 30 electoral districts in at least seven different provinces and territories,
- pay a $50,000 non-refundable entrance fee, half of which must be paid when filing nomination with the other half due by the close of nominations on February 24, 2017.
- pay an additional $50,000 compliance deposit, by December 31, 2016, or when filing nomination for those who register in 2017, which is refundable provided the candidate complies with campaign rules.
- and fill out a 40-page questionnaire that asks for:
  - references,
  - criminal background and credit checks,
  - agreement with basic party principles,
  - a list of social media accounts,
  - questions about possible controversial positions the candidate has taken in the past, and
  - questions about affiliations and personal associations and behaviour that may be problematic.

A party committee reviewed the candidate's nomination form and may disqualify a potential candidate. Candidates are allowed to spend a maximum of $5 million on their campaigns.

== Timeline ==
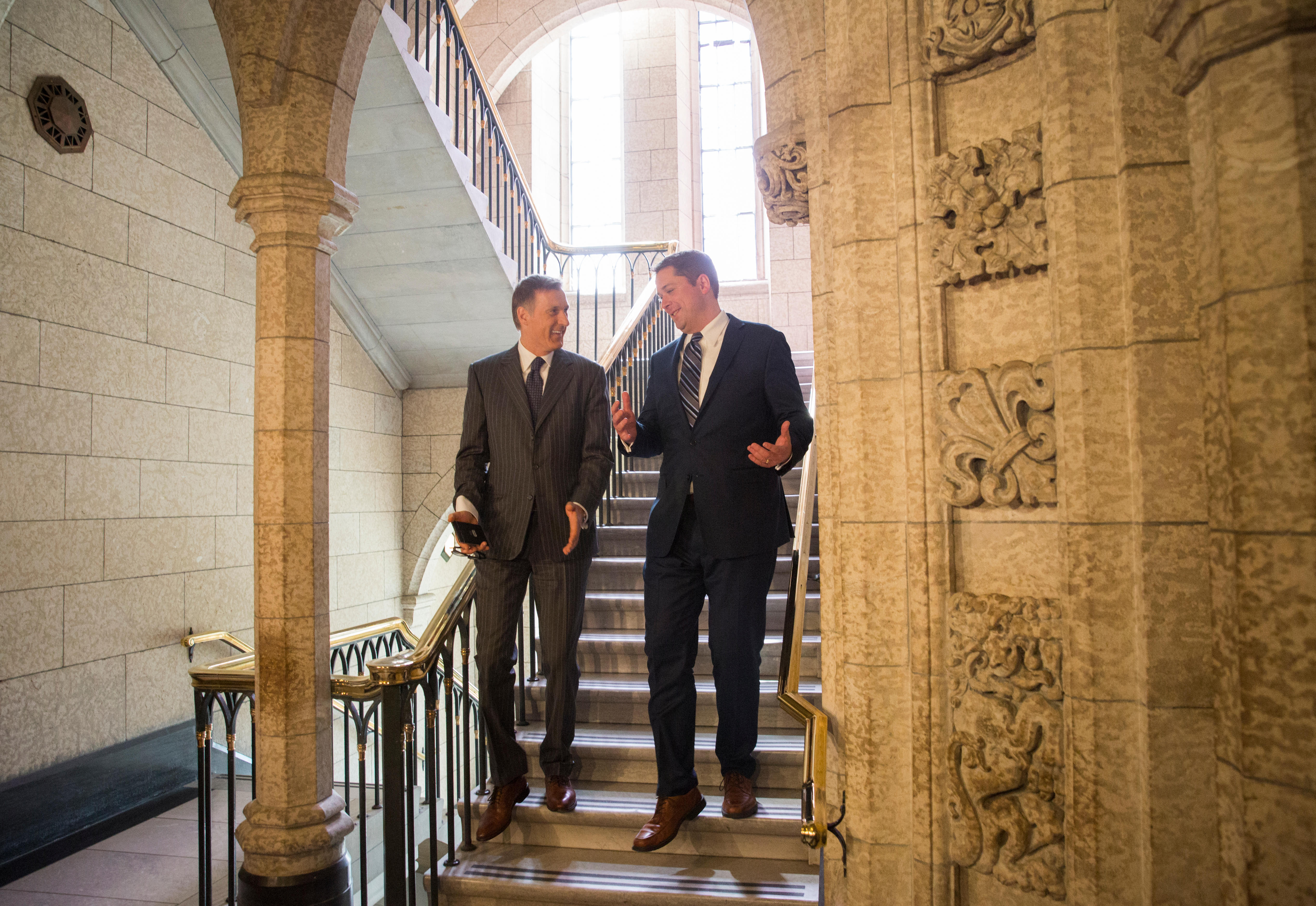
Maxime Bernier and Andrew Scheer walking down the stairs at Parliament Hill, May 30, 2017.

- October 19, 2015 – Federal election results in defeat of Conservative government. As Harper spoke to supporters in Calgary, making no reference to his future, a statement was released by the party announcing Harper's resignation as party leader and his request that an interim leader be chosen to lead the party in parliament until a leadership election can be held.
- November 4, 2015 – Harper resigns as prime minister; Liberal government led by Justin Trudeau sworn in.
- November 5, 2015 – Conservative caucus held its first meeting since the 2015 federal election and chose former health minister Rona Ambrose interim leader of the party.
- December 4–5, 2015 – National Council meets, 20-member Leadership Election Organization Committee appointed, including seven members of the National Council and MP Diane Finley, all of whom have pledged to be neutral during the leadership campaign; Dan Nowlan is appointed the committee's chair.
- January 15–17, 2016 – The Leadership Election Organization Committee meets at the Albany Club in Toronto to decide on the date of the leadership vote, the deadline for candidates to be nominated, campaign spending limits, the entrance fee for candidates and the appeals process for any disputes.
- May 26–28, 2016 – Conservative Party national policy convention, held at the Vancouver Convention Centre, voted on policy resolutions and elected the party president and other officials. An attempt to change the party constitution to allow the party's interim leader, Rona Ambrose, to seek the permanent leadership is defeated.
- September 12, 2016 – Former Foreign Minister Peter MacKay, who had been leading public opinion polls as the most popular potential leader, announces that he will not be a candidate for the party's leadership.
- November 2, 2016 – Only those who have registered as candidates by this date, including having paid at least $25,000 of the candidate deposit, are permitted to participate in the first leadership debate, to be held the following week. 12 candidates meet this deadline.
- November 9, 2016 – First of five official leadership debates organized by the LEOC, held in Saskatoon.
- November 13, 2016 – Leadership debate organized by the Carleton Conservative Association, held in Greely, Ontario
- December 6, 2016 – Second official debate held in Moncton in English and French.
- December 31, 2016 – Deadline for candidates who filed their nomination papers in 2016 to have paid $50,000 compliance fee.
- January 17, 2017, 6:30 pm – Third official debate held in Quebec City in French at the Quebec Convention Centre. The themes covered will be government and taxes.
- February 4, 2017 – Leadership debate organized by the Progressive Conservative Party of Nova Scotia was held in Halifax, Nova Scotia. The first debate involving well-known businessman Kevin O'Leary.
- February 24, 2017, 5pm ET (UTC-5) – Nomination period closes; deadline for candidates to pay any remaining balance of entrance fee.
- February 24, 2017 – Leadership debate organized by the Manning Centre for Building Democracy, held in Ottawa, Ontario
- February 28, 2017 – Fourth official debate, held in Edmonton at the Maclab Theatre in English and French.
- March 28, 2017, 5pm ET (UTC-4) – Members who have joined by this date are eligible to vote.
- April 26, 2017 – Presumed frontrunner Kevin O'Leary withdraws from the election and endorses Maxime Bernier; as O'Leary has withdrawn after the deadline, his name remains on the ballot. Final leadership debate is held.
- April 28, 2017 – Voting by mail-in ranked ballot begins.
- May 26, 2017, 5pm ET (UTC-5) – Deadline for mail-in ballots to be received.
- May 27, 2017 – In-person voting at Toronto Congress Centre and 14 polling stations across the country until 4 pm ET (UTC-5). Advance and in-person ballots counted; results announced.

== Full results ==
Results by ballot
Candidate	Round 1		Round 2		Round 3		Round 4		Round 5		Round 6		Round 7		Round 8		Round 9		Round 10		Round 11		Round 12		Round 13	
Candidate	Points	%	Points	%	Points	%	Points	%	Points	%	Points	%	Points	%	Points	%	Points	%	Points	%	Points	%	Points	%	Points	%
Andrew Scheer	7,375.79	21.82%	7,383.69	21.85%	7,427.00	21.97%	7,455.34	22.06%	7,492.06	22.17%	7,597.28	22.48%	7,764.64	22.97%	8,061.08	23.85%	8,798.38	26.03%	9,557.67	28.28%	10,235.27	30.28%	12,965.47	38.36%	17,222.20	50.95%
Maxime Bernier	9,763.32	28.89%	9,823.57	29.06%	9,854.61	29.16%	9,922.23	29.36%	10,114.67	29.93%	10,208.33	30.20%	10,313.15	30.51%	10,557.48	31.24%	10,709.58	31.69%	11,570.59	34.23%	12,360.08	36.57%	13,647.14	40.38%	16,577.80	49.05%
Erin O'Toole	3,600.72	10.65%	3,609.15	10.68%	3,634.90	10.75%	3,669.07	10.86%	3,708.41	10.97%	3,769.09	11.15%	3,824.62	11.32%	4,181.26	12.37%	4,324.01	12.79%	4,947.86	14.64%	6,372.85	18.85%	7,187.38	21.26%		
Brad Trost	2,820.87	8.35%	2,826.57	8.36%	2,829.77	8.37%	2,834.43	8.39%	2,843.35	8.41%	2,852.31	8.44%	2,862.22	8.47%	2,883.76	8.53%	4,340.70	12.84%	4,633.83	13.71%	4,831.80	14.30%				
Michael Chong	2,552.47	7.55%	2,572.68	7.61%	2,583.56	7.64%	2,605.63	7.71%	2,618.63	7.75%	2,666.15	7.89%	2,692.83	7.97%	2,907.60	8.60%	2,939.29	8.70%	3,090.04	9.14%						
Kellie Leitch	2,366.09	7.00%	2,375.00	7.03%	2,383.03	7.05%	2,398.07	7.09%	2,430.25	7.19%	2,454.84	7.26%	2,516.67	7.45%	2,615.63	7.74%	2,688.03	7.95%								
Pierre Lemieux	2,495.71	7.38%	2,498.29	7.39%	2,503.92	7.41%	2,510.33	7.43%	2,518.29	7.45%	2,538.17	7.51%	2,561.77	7.58%	2,593.18	7.67%										
Lisa Raitt	1,127.93	3.34%	1,137.56	3.37%	1,164.85	3.45%	1,188.15	3.52%	1,208.97	3.58%	1,244.56	3.68%	1,264.10	3.74%												
Steven Blaney	426.37	1.26%	429.13	1.27%	433.00	1.28%	440.71	1.30%	448.37	1.33%	469.25	1.39%														
Chris Alexander	379.10	1.12%	385.01	1.14%	391.05	1.16%	407.47	1.21%	417.00	1.23%																
Kevin O'Leary	361.21	1.07%	364.74	1.08%	367.33	1.09%	368.56	1.09%																		
Rick Peterson	220.58	0.65%	223.09	0.66%	226.96	0.67%																				
Andrew Saxton	169.94	0.50%	171.50	0.51%																						
Deepak Obhrai	139.90	0.41%																								

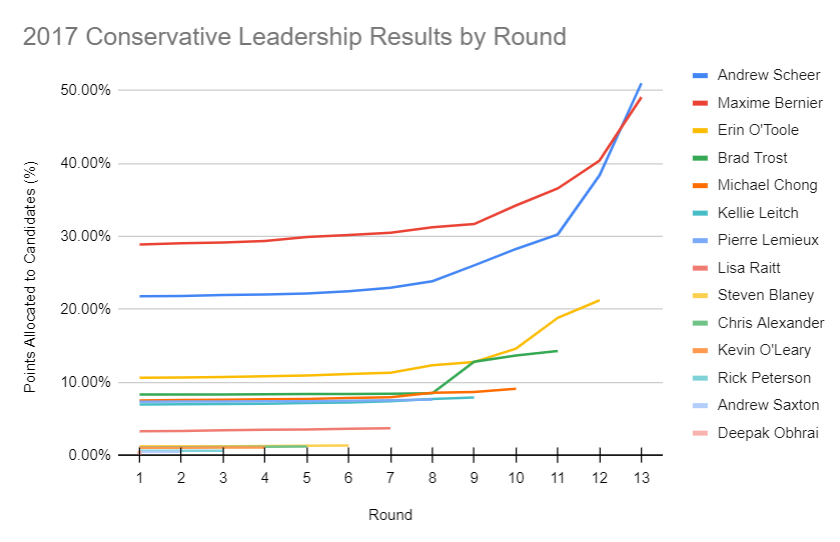
2017 Conservative leadership election results by round.

First round
Bernier	28.89%
Scheer	21.82%
O'Toole	10.65%
Trost	8.35%
Chong	7.55%
Lemieux	7.38%
Leitch	7.00%
Raitt	3.34%
Blaney	1.26%
Alexander	1.12%
O'Leary	1.07%
Peterson	0.50%
Saxton	0.50%
Obhrai	0.41%

Final round
Scheer	50.95%
Bernier	49.05%

=== Provincial summary ===
First round result
Province	Alexander	Bernier	Blaney	Chong	Leitch	Lemieux	Obhrai	O'Leary	O'Toole	Peterson	Raitt	Saxton	Scheer	Trost
Alberta	0.56%	35.54%	0.34%	4.63%	5.95%	6.04%	1.09%	1.52%	10.24%	0.57%	1.77%	0.28%	23.65%	7.79%
British Columbia	0.70%	24.81%	0.34%	9.60%	7.79%	7.30%	0.34%	1.07%	12.50%	1.04%	2.88%	1.46%	20.02%	10.15%
Manitoba	0.41%	28.40%	0.59%	5.75%	7.25%	13.94%	0.12%	1.43%	13.78%	0.67%	2.58%	0.27%	17.97%	6.84%
New Brunswick	0.53%	22.09%	0.62%	8.03%	7.51%	7.14%	0.03%	0.74%	14.31%	0.84%	8.94%	1.46%	22.58%	5.17%
Newfoundland and Labrador	0.32%	29.79%	0.35%	8.00%	14.09%	6.93%	0.77%	0.29%	10.92%	0.66%	5.55%	0.91%	16.17%	5.25%
Northwest Territories	0.75%	33.83%	0.00%	10.53%	9.02%	4.51%	1.50%	0.75%	11.28%	3.76%	5.26%	0.00%	17.29%	1.50%
Nova Scotia	0.82%	21.83%	0.17%	8.29%	7.07%	5.29%	0.30%	0.75%	17.25%	0.73%	13.98%	1.02%	16.98%	5.52%
Nunavut	0.00%	50.00%	0.00%	12.50%	6.25%	0.00%	0.00%	0.00%	6.25%	0.00%	6.25%	0.00%	18.75%	0.00%
Ontario	1.78%	24.41%	0.39%	10.85%	7.56%	9.20%	0.51%	1.35%	12.08%	0.50%	3.89%	0.27%	16.21%	11.00%
Prince Edward Island	0.52%	15.13%	0.52%	7.97%	6.38%	8.06%	0.30%	0.29%	16.87%	0.30%	6.93%	2.43%	29.42%	4.87%
Quebec	1.12%	39.38%	4.24%	3.55%	5.99%	4.43%	0.16%	0.64%	5.92%	0.73%	1.09%	0.22%	27.68%	4.86%
Saskatchewan	0.15%	18.16%	0.13%	2.10%	3.92%	7.93%	0.07%	0.76%	6.83%	0.19%	1.42%	0.18%	47.54%	10.63%
Yukon	0.94%	21.70%	0.31%	9.75%	5.66%	4.40%	0.00%	0.94%	21.70%	1.57%	13.84%	0.31%	14.15%	4.72%

=== Analysis ===
According to raw voting figures, Scheer received 62,593 votes on the final ballot compared to 55,544 votes for Bernier with 23,000 voters who had voted in the first round ranking neither Scheer or Bernier in their ranked ballot. Votes were apportioned among ridings so that each riding was allocated 100 points, regardless of the number of voters, resulting in 17,222.20 points (50.95%) for Scheer and 16,577.80 points (49.05%) for Bernier.

== Debates ==
Debates among candidates for the 2017 Conservative Party of Canada leadership election
No.	Date	Time	Place	Host	Participants															
P Participant N Non-invitee A Absent invitee O Out of race (exploring or withdrawn)					Alexander	Bernier	Blaney	Chong	Leitch	Lemieux	Lindsay	Obhrai	O'Leary	O'Toole	Peterson	Raitt	Saxton	Scheer	Snow	Trost
Conservative Party of Canada leadership election debates
1	November 9, 2016	6 p.m. CST	Delta Bessborough; Saskatoon, SK	Conservative Party of Canada	P	P	P	P	P	N	P	P	O	P	N	P	P	P	N	P
2	November 13, 2016	1 p.m. EST	Orchard View Wedding & Event Center; Greely, ON	Carleton Conservative Electoral District Association (EDA)	P	P	A	P	A	N	A	P	O	P	N	P	P	P	N	P
3	December 6, 2016	7:30 p.m. AST	Crowne Plaza; Moncton, NB	Conservative Party of Canada	P	P	P	P	P	P	P	P	O	P	P	P	P	P	N	P
4	January 17, 2017	6:30 p.m. EST	Hôtel Hilton; Quebec City, QC	Conservative Party of Canada	P	P	P	P	P	P	O	P	O	P	P	P	P	P	O	P
5	January 19, 2017	6:30 p.m. CST	Metropolitan Entertainment Centre; Winnipeg, MB	Elmwood—Transcona Conservative EDA	A	P	P	P	A	P	O	P	N	P	P	P	P	P	O	P
6	February 4, 2017	6 p.m. EST	The Westin Nova Scotian; Halifax, NS	Progressive Conservative Party of Nova Scotia	P	P	P	P	P	P	O	P	P	P	P	P	P	P	O	P
7	February 13, 2017	7 p.m. EST	Holiday Inn Express & Suites Montreal Airport; Montreal, QC	Lac-Saint-Louis Conservative EDA; Pierrefonds—Dollard Conservative EDA	P	P	P	P	P	N	O	A	P	P	P	P	P	P	O	N
8	February 19, 2017	1 p.m. EST	Vogue Theatre; Vancouver, BC	Vancouver Centre Conservative Association	P	A	P	P	A	A	O	A	A	P	P	P	P	P	O	P
9	February 24, 2017	3 p.m. EST	Shaw Centre; Ottawa, ON	Manning Centre	P	P	P	P	P	P	O	P	P	P	P	P	P	P	O	P
10	February 28, 2017	6 p.m. MST	Citadel Theatre; Edmonton, AB	Conservative Party of Canada	P	P	P	P	P	P	O	P	A	P	P	P	P	P	O	P
11	March 1, 2017	7 p.m. MST	Deerfoot Inn and Casino; Calgary, AB	Calgary Centre Conservative EDA	P	P	P	P	P	P	O	P	A	P	P	P	P	P	O	P
12	March 24, 2017	7 p.m. EDT	Komoka Wellness & Recreation Centre; London, ON	Lambton—Kent—Middlesex Conservative EDA	P	A	P	P	A	P	O	A	A	P	P	P	A	P	O	P
13	April 2, 2017	2 p.m. EDT	Eglinton Theatre; Eglinton, ON	Eglinton—Lawrence Conservative EDA	P	P	P	P	P	P	O	P	A	P	P	P	P	P	O	P
14	April 3–5, 2017	5 p.m. EDT	9 Channel Nine Court; Toronto, ON	CTV News	P	P	P	P	P	P	O	P	P	P	P	P	P	P	O	P
15	April 26, 2017	6 p.m. EDT	St. Lawrence Centre for the Arts; Toronto, ON	Conservative Party of Canada	P	P	P	P	P	P	O	P	O	P	P	P	P	P	O	P
16	May 6, 2017	2 p.m. EDT	Royal Canadian Legion Branch 586; South Bruce Peninsula, ON	Bruce—Grey—Owen Sound Conservative EDA	P	A	A	P	P	P	O	A	O	A	A	P	A	P	O	A

== Registered candidates ==
Candidates who paid their entrance fee and compliance deposit and filed their nomination papers:

=== Chris Alexander ===
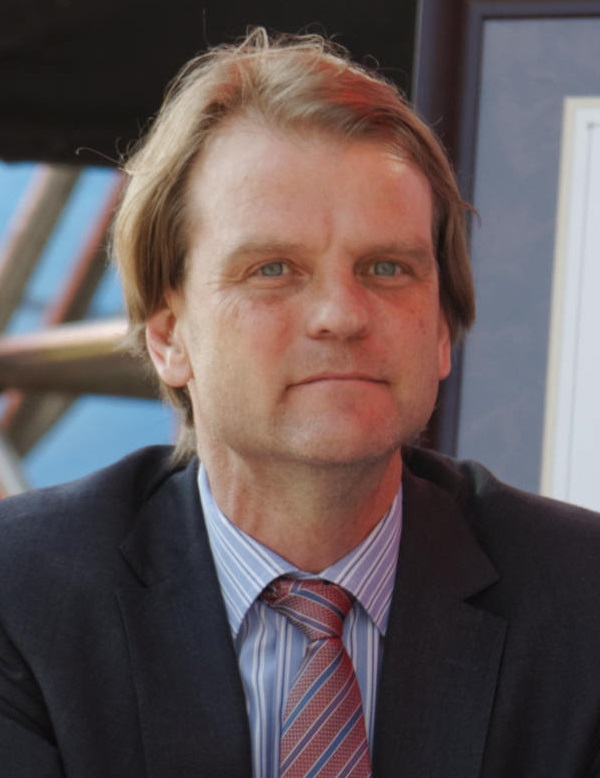
Chris Alexander

Background

Chris Alexander, 48, is the former Minister of Citizenship and Immigration (2013–2015), Parliamentary Secretary to Minister of National Defence (2011– 2013) and the former MP for Ajax—Pickering, Ontario (2011–2015). Prior to entering politics, he served as a member of Canada's foreign diplomatic service, most notably in the Canadian Embassy in Moscow and as the Canadian Ambassador to Afghanistan from 2003 to 2005. From 2005 to 2009 he held the post of Deputy Special Representative of the United Nations Secretary General for Afghanistan. In addition to English, he is fluent in both French and Russian languages.

Date campaign announced: October 12, 2016
Endorsements

- Former MPs: (1) Yuri Shymko (Parkdale, 1978–1979)

Policies

Chris Alexander has 40 detailed published policies that fall into three main categories: New Economy, New Country and New Role. These policies include how Canada should approach: employment, taxation, innovation, families, education, competitiveness, energy self-reliance, cities, agriculture, poverty, homelessness, First Nations peoples, the Métis, refugees, the Monarchy, justice, health care, protecting wilderness, forestry, mining, international diplomacy, terrorism, democratic reform, cyber-security, Canadian culture, northern development, and national defence.

He believes that immigration is the key to "economic growth." Is proposing to increase immigration to 400,000 a year including 40,000 refugees and calling for doubling defence spending and "for an accelerated push to settle all outstanding land claims and to sign treaties with First Nations communities that would empower them to govern themselves". Was prominent in the Conservative government's handling of the Syrian refugee crisis and in the government's promise during the 2015 election to create a telephone tip line to report so-called "barbaric cultural practices." As minister, he was criticized over delays in meeting the government's commitment to resettle Syrian refugees.

=== Maxime Bernier ===
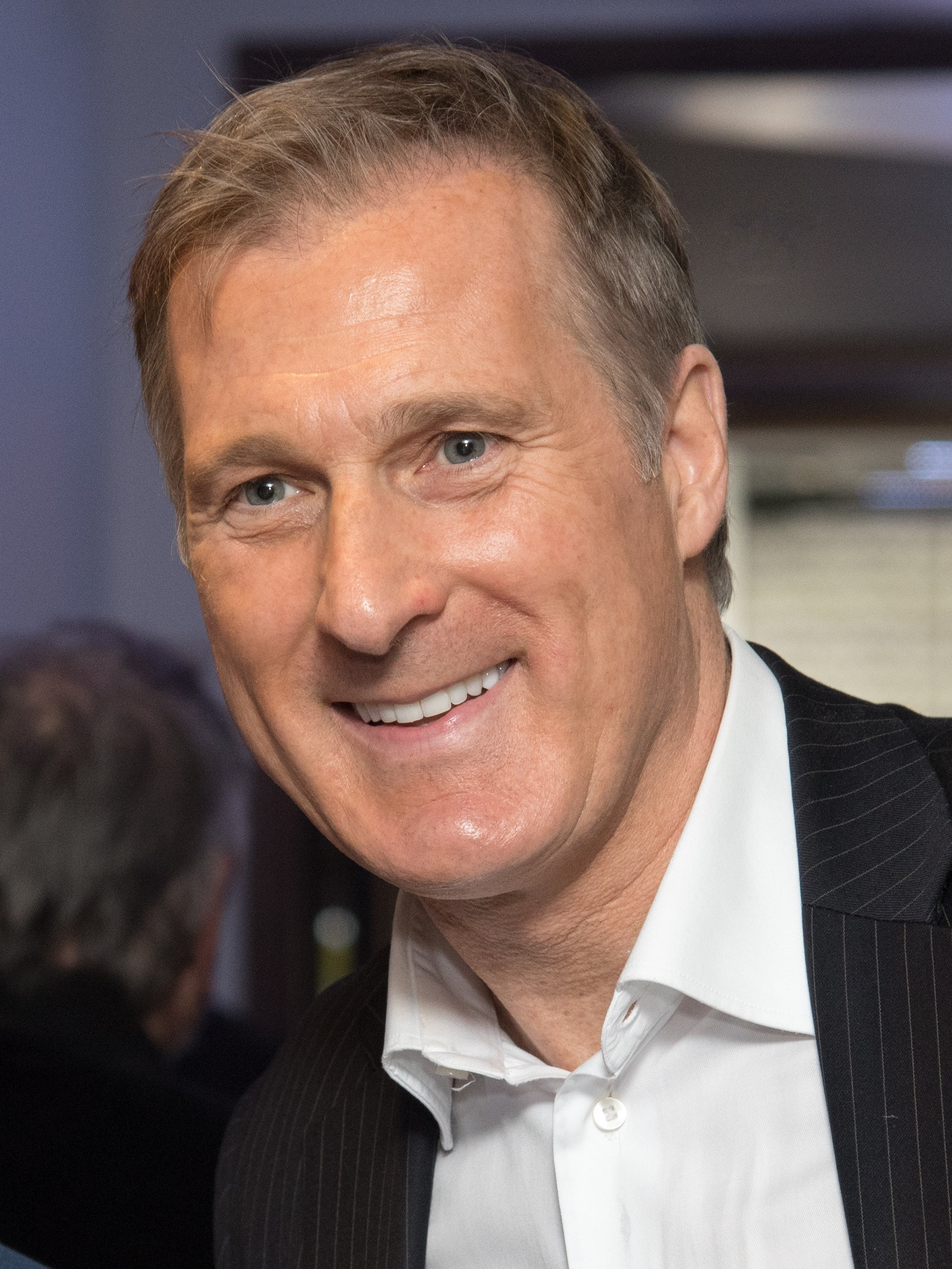
Maxime Bernier

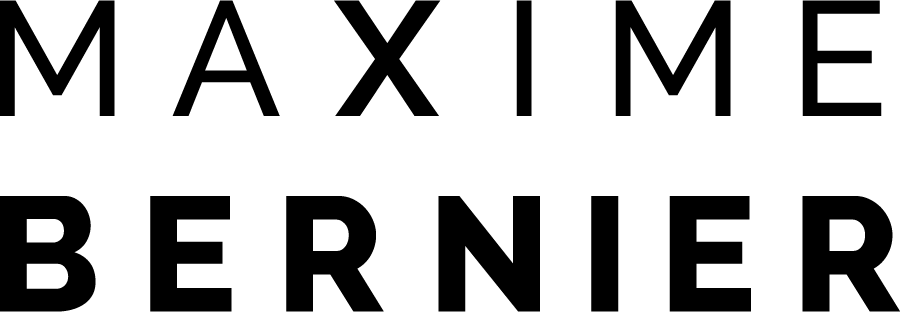
Campaign logo

Background

Maxime Bernier, 54, was the MP for Beauce, Quebec (2006–2019) and was the Shadow Minister of Innovation (2015–2016). He served in the Harper government as Minister of State for Small Business and Tourism (2011–2015), Minister of Foreign Affairs (2007–2008), and Minister of Industry (2006–2007), Bernier is considered an advocate of limited government and has been compared to a Libertarian. He has been nicknamed "Mad Max", the "Bloc-buster", or the "Albertan from Quebec" by his Ottawa colleagues. Prior to entering federal politics in 2006, Bernier, a lawyer by training, was vice-president of the Standard Life of Canada Insurance company, MEI, and manager of corporate and international relations at the Commission des valeurs mobilières du Québec.

Date candidacy announced: April 7, 2016

Endorsements of Maxime Bernier

MPs: (7)

- Dan Albas (Central Okanagan—Similkameen—Nicola)
- Alupa Clarke (Beauport—Limoilou)
- Tony Clement (Parry Sound-Muskoka)
- Jacques Gourde (Lévis—Lotbinière)
- Tom Kmiec (Calgary Shepard)
- Alex Nuttall (Barrie—Springwater—Oro-Medonte)
- Len Webber (Calgary Confederation)

Senators: (11)

- Lynn Beyak (Ontario)
- Claude Carignan (Quebec; Opposition Senate Leader, 2015–2017)
- Nicole Eaton (Ontario)
- Thanh Hai Ngo (Ontario)
- Stephen Greene (Nova Scotia)
- Leo Housakos (Quebec; Speaker of the Senate, 2015)
- Michael L. MacDonald (Nova Scotia)
- Ghislain Maltais (Quebec)
- Kelvin Ogilvie (Nova Scotia)
- Larry Smith (Quebec, Opposition Senate Leader)

Provincial politicians: (15)

- Leela Aheer (Alberta MLA for Chestermere-Rocky View)
- Jason Nixon (Alberta MLA for Rimbey-Rocky Mountain House-Sundre)
- Scott Cyr (Alberta MLA for Bonnyville-Cold Lake)
- Mike Ellis (Alberta MLA for Calgary-West)
- Derek Fildebrandt (Alberta MLA for Strathmore-Brooks)
- Steven Fletcher (Manitoba MLA for Assiniboia)
- Trevor Holder (New Brunswick MLA for Portland-Simonds)
- Don MacIntyre (Alberta MLA for Innisfail-Sylvan Lake)
- Angela Pitt (Alberta MLA for Airdrie)
- Laura Ross (Saskatchewan MLA for Regina Rochdale)
- Glen Savoie (New Brunswick MLA for Saint John East)
- Dorothy Shephard (New Brunswick MLA for Saint John Lancaster)
- Jake Stewart (New Brunswick MLA for Southwest Miramichi-Bay du Vin)
- Rick Strankman (Alberta MLA for Drumheller-Stettler)
- Wes Taylor (Alberta MLA for Battle River-Wainwright)

Municipal politicians: (7)

- Fred Bamber (MD of Bonnyville councillor for Ward 6)
- Sean Chu (Calgary City Councillor for Ward 4)
- Ron Higgins (Mayor of North Frontenac)
- Joe Magliocca (Calgary City Councillor for Ward 2)
- Mathew Siscoe (St. Catharines City Councillor for Ward 4)
- Ward Sutherland (Calgary City Councillor for Ward 1)
- Matt Whitman (Halifax City Councillor for Hammonds Plains-St. Margarets; Deputy Mayor of Halifax, 2015–2016)

Former MPs: (15)

- Gilles Bernier (Beauce, 1984–1997 and Maxime Bernier's father)
- Rick Casson (Lethbridge, 1997–2011)
- Russ Hiebert (South Surrey—White Rock—Cloverdale, 2004–2015)
- Jay Hill (Prince George—Peace River, 1993–2010)
- Ryan Leef (Yukon, 2011–2015)
- Gary Lunn (Saanich—Gulf Islands, 1997–2011),
- Charlie Mayer (Lisgar—Marquette, 1979–1993),
- Joe Oliver (Eglinton—Lawrence, 2011–2015)
- Pat Perkins (Whitby—Oshawa, 2014–2015),
- Brent Rathgeber (Edmonton—St. Albert, 2008–2015)
- John Reynolds (West Vancouver—Sunshine Coast—Sea to Sky Country; Interim Canadian Alliance leader and Acting Leader of the Opposition 2001–2002)
- Joy Smith (Kildonan—St. Paul, 2004-2015)
- Brian Storseth (Westlock—St. Paul, 2006–2015)
- Lawrence Toet (Elmwood—Transcona, 2011–2015)
- Gerry Weiner (Pierrefonds—Dollard, 1984–1993)

Former Senators: (1)

- Michel Rivard (Quebec, 2009–2016)

Former provincial politicians: (6)

- Dominic Cardy (Leader of New Brunswick New Democratic Party, 2011–2017; Chief of Staff to leader of the Progressive Conservative Party of New Brunswick),
- Kevin Falcon (British Columbia MLA for Surrey-Cloverdale, 2001–2013)
- Heather Forsyth (Alberta MLA for Calgary-Fish Creek, 1993–2015; Wildrose Party Leader, 2014–2015)
- John Hastings (Ontario MPP for Etobicoke North, 1995–2003
- Robert Libman (Quebec MNA for D'Arcy-McGee, 1989–1994)
- Wes McLean (New Brunswick MLA for Victoria-Tobique, 2010-2014)

Former municipal politicians: (2)

- Maddie Di Muccio (Newmarket Town Councillor for Ward 6, 2010-2014)
- John Koury (North Cowichan Municipal Councillor, 2008-2014)

Other prominent individuals: (16)

- David Asper (Winnipeg Philanthropist; Former Winnipeg Blue Bombers Chair)
- Andrew Boddington (Ontario PC Party Executive Director, 2012–2014)
- John Capobianco (FleishmanHillard National Lead)
- Jeff Callaway (President of the Wildrose Party)
- Marc Emery (Marijuana Legalization Activist)
- Louis-Charles Fortier (Conservative Party National Councillor for Quebec, 2015-2016) Stanley Hartt (Chief of Staff, Prime Minister's Office 1989–1990),
- Sonia Kont (Alberta PC Youth Association President)
- Babu Nagalingam (Senior Advisor to the Ontario Leader of the Opposition)
- Gerry Nichols (Former Vice President of the National Citizens Coalition)
- George Richardson (President of the Canadian Alliance, 2002)
- Kevin O'Leary (Businessman, celebrity; Conservative Party of Canada Leadership Contestant, 2017)
- Tony Oliver (former vice president of the Progressive Conservative Party of Newfoundland and Labrador)
- Kory Teneycke (Director of Communications, Prime Minister's Office 2008–2009)
- Michael Wekerle (Dragons' Den Panelist, 2014–2017)
- Mark Whiffen (President of the Progressive Conservative Party of Newfoundland and Labrador, 2014–2016)

Organizations: (4)

- Canadian Taxpayers Federation Generation Screwed project
- Memorial University Campus Conservatives
- Queen's University Conservative Association
- Young Progressive Conservatives of Newfoundland and Labrador

Media: (7)

- Larry Berman (Business News Network Host)
- Conrad Black (National Post Columnist)
- Éric Duhaime (Journal de Montréal Columnist; former Canadian Alliance advisor)
- Nathan Giede (Prince George Citizen Columnist)
- Lorne Gunter (Edmonton Sun Columnist),
- Andrew Lawton (The Andrew Lawton Show Radio Host),
- Lauren Southern (Rebel Media Commentator)

Policies

- Running a campaign based on individual freedom, personal responsibility, respect and fairness. Expects support around the ideas/policies he is placing in the campaigns.
- Calls for smaller government, lower taxes everywhere, paying down the national debt, increasing investments, increase pipeline developments, and opening up markets. Opposes bailout to any corporation, and use of "corporate welfare" (business subsidies). Supports the decriminalization/legalization of marijuana Wants to allow MPs to vote their conscience and get rid of omnibus bills.
- Phasing control of Canada Health Transfer to the provinces for health care by replacing it with a health transfer point systems, encourage provinces to move away from a single-payer healthcare system to a two-tier healthcare system, balance the budget within two years then reduce the number of tax brackets from five to three, increase basic exemption from $11,474 to $15,000 being paid by "boutique" tax credits. Supports abolishing capital gains taxes, and lowering corporate taxes to 10% by getting rid of corporate welfare.
- Opposes a "Canadian values" test on the basis that it is logistically ineffective to fight terrorism. Abolish the Canadian Radio-television Telecommunications Commission, privatizing Canada Post Corporation, phasing out supply management on dairy and poultry, and expanding free trade. Ending inter-provincial barriers as a priority.
- He also wants to "break" Quebec's maple syrup cartel and wants to allow foreign ownership for the airline industry. He wants to "streamline the process for hiring specialized workers abroad". He wants to put more emphasis on economic immigration and "slightly reduce" family reunification class immigration. More privately sponsored refugee and fewer government sponsored. Reform temporary foreign worker programs. Bernier believes first nation communities need to be consulted before the Indian Act needs to be "abolished, or changed." Opposes federal control overreaching into other jurisdictions. Create stricter foreign aid standards and phase out development aid.

=== Steven Blaney ===
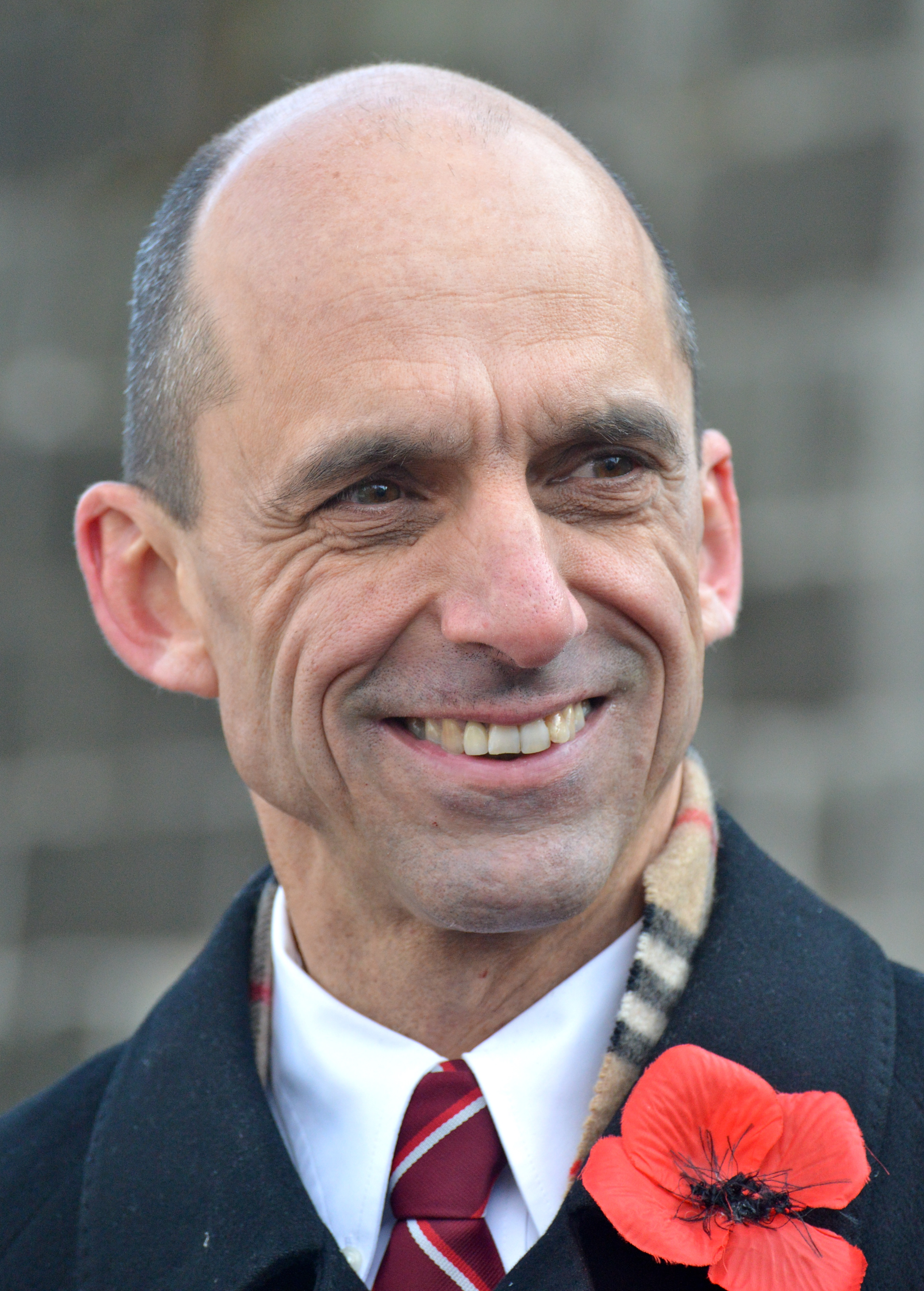
Steven Blaney

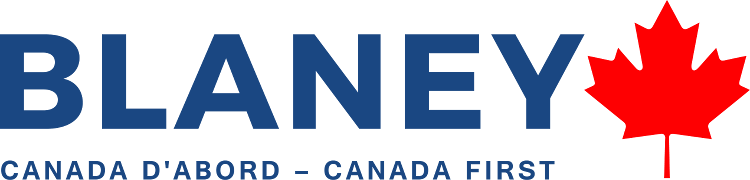
Campaign logo

Background

Steven Blaney, 52, was the Shadow Minister of Public Works and Government Services (2015–2016) for the Conservative Opposition, and is the former Minister of Public Safety and Emergency Preparedness (2013–2015), Minister of Veterans Affairs (2011–2013). He was the MP for Bellechasse—Les Etchemins—Lévis, Quebec (2015–2021) and Lévis—Bellechasse, Quebec (2006–2015).

Date campaign announced: October 23, 2016
Endorsements
MPs:
Senators: (2)

- Pierre-Hugues Boisvenu (Quebec),
- Jean-Guy Dagenais (Quebec)

Provincial politicians:
Municipal politicians:
Former MPs:
Former Senators:
Former provincial politicians:
Former municipal politicians:
Other prominent individuals:
Organizations:
Media:
Policies
Supports banning the wearing of the niqab while voting, taking the citizenship oath, or by federal public servants, even if such a ban would require invoking the notwithstanding clause of the Constitution in order to override the Charter of Rights and Freedoms. Also advocates testing of would be citizens on "their understanding and appreciation of Canada's core principles." He wants to "beef up" screening. The number of immigrants he wants to bring in will be based upon labour-market studies.

=== Michael Chong ===
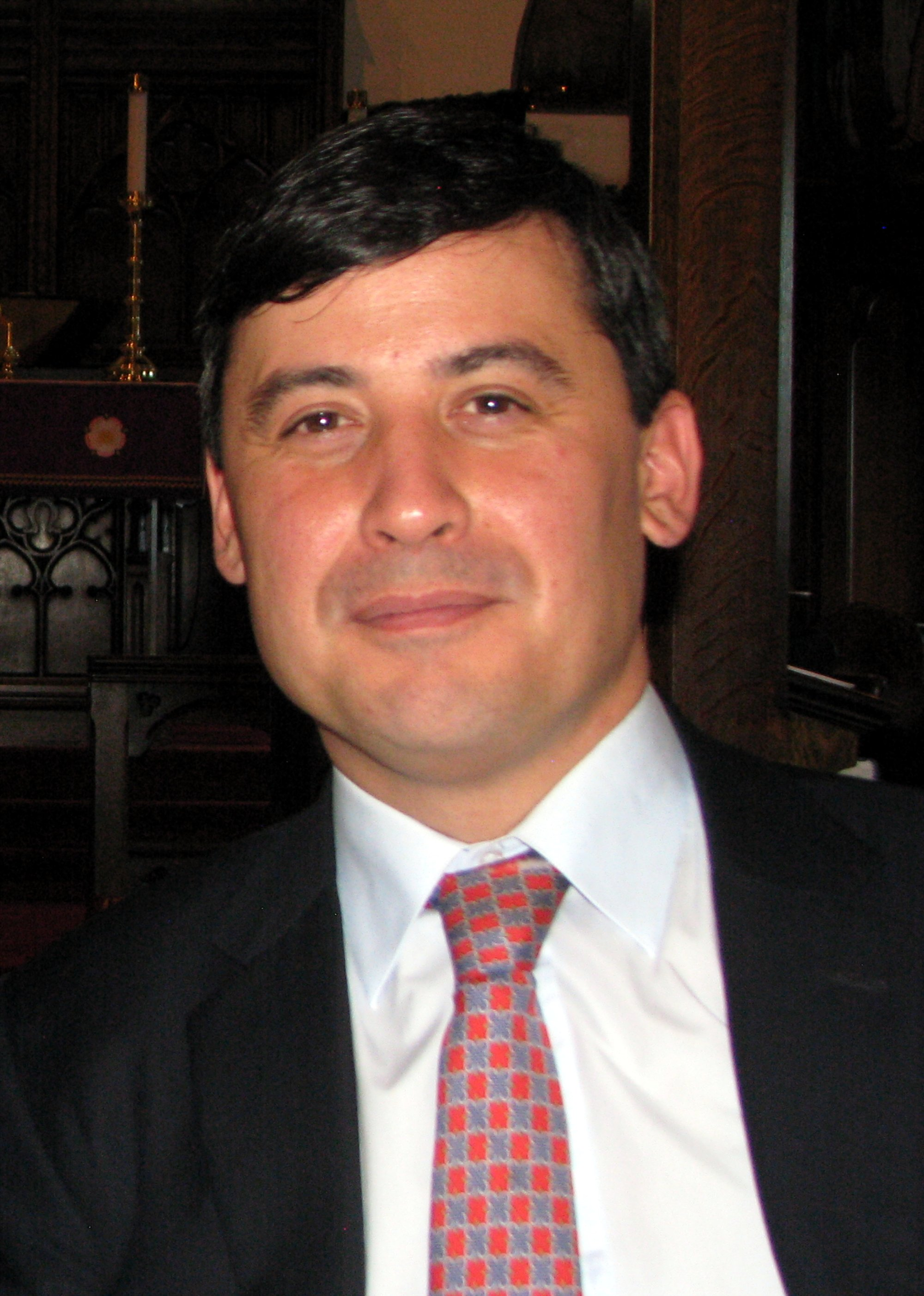
Michael Chong

Background

Michael Chong, 45, is the MP for Wellington—Halton Hills, Ontario (2004–present) and was the Deputy Shadow Minister of the Environment (2015–2016). He was Minister of Intergovernmental Affairs and Youth (2006) and Minister of Sport (2006). Chong resigned from the Harper cabinet in 2006 to protest the government's recognition of the Québécois as a nation within Canada. As a backbench MP he advocated democratic reforms in Parliament to limit the power of the Prime Minister's Office and party leaders over their caucuses and individual MPs and introduced the Reform Act to give caucuses the option of the power to remove party leaders, elect caucus chairs, and expel or readmit MPs, and elect interim leaders. He was a member of the Progressive Conservative Party at the time of the merger.

Date campaign announced: May 16, 2016

Endorsements of Michael Chong

Endorsements
MPs: (2)

- Peter Kent (Thornhill)
- David Tilson (Dufferin—Caledon)

Senators: (1)

- Victor Oh (Ontario)

Provincial politicians: (1)

- Ted Arnott (Ontario MPP for Wellington—Halton Hills)

Municipal politicians: (1)

- Tracy McGibbon (Bancroft Town councillor)

Former MPs: (6)

- Pauline Browes (Scarborough Centre, 1984–1993)
- Chungsen Leung (Willowdale, 2011–2015)
- John McDermid (Brampton, 1979–1993)
- Mike Wallace (Burlington, 2006–2015)
- Rodney Weston (Saint John, 2008–2015)
- Terence Young (Oakville, 2008–2015)

Former Senators: (2)

- W. David Angus (Quebec, 1993–2012)
- Erminie Cohen (New Brunswick, 1993–2001)

Former provincial politicians: (4)

- Ted Chudleigh (Ontario MPP for Halton, 1995–2014)
- Olga Ilich (British Columbia MLA for Richmond Centre, 2005–2009)
- Gary Mar (Alberta MLA for Calgary Nose Creek, 1993–2004, and Calgary-Mackay, 2004–2007)
- Réjean Savoie (New Brunswick MLA for Miramichi Bay, 1999–2003)
- Former municipal politicians: (1)
- Gordon Chong (Toronto City Councillor for Don Parkway, 1994–2000)

Other prominent individuals: (10)

- Yaroslav Baran (Conservative Party of Canada Communications Director, 2004–2008)
- Ches Crosbie (St. John's lawyer)
- Susan Elliott (PC Party National Director, 1999–2002)
- Alex Girard-Lord (New Brunswick PC Youth Association President)
- Andrew MacDougall (Director of Communications, Prime Minister's Office 2012-2013)
- Harry Near (PC National Campaign Director for the 1984 and 1988 federal elections)
- Geoff Norquay (Director of Communications to Stephen Harper, 2004–2005)
- William Stairs (Director of Communications, Prime Minister's Office 2006)
- Thomas Symons (Trent University Founder)
- Peter White (Principal Secretary, Prime Minister's Office 1988–1989)

Organizations: (1)

- Greenpac

Media: (5)

- Andrew Coyne (National Post Columnist)
- Scott Gilmore (Maclean's Columnist),
- Michael Harris (iPolitics Columnist)
- Lawrence Martin (The Globe and Mail Columnist)
- Chris Selley (National Post Columnist)

Policies

- Advocates modernizing democratic institutions and strengthening the independence of MPs and parliamentary committees.
- Calls for the privatization of Canada Mortgage and Housing Corporation's (CMHC) mortgage insurance and securitization business, a measure he says will make housing more affordable in Canada.
- Supports introducing a revenue neutral carbon tax. Chong's plan would phase in a carbon tax over a decade, while immediately cutting taxes by $18 billion and getting rid of green regulations and subsidies.
- Believes that Canada needs an evidence-based immigration policy that would put economic interests at the forefront. He has criticized face-to-face values screening as a divisive tactic.

=== Kellie Leitch ===
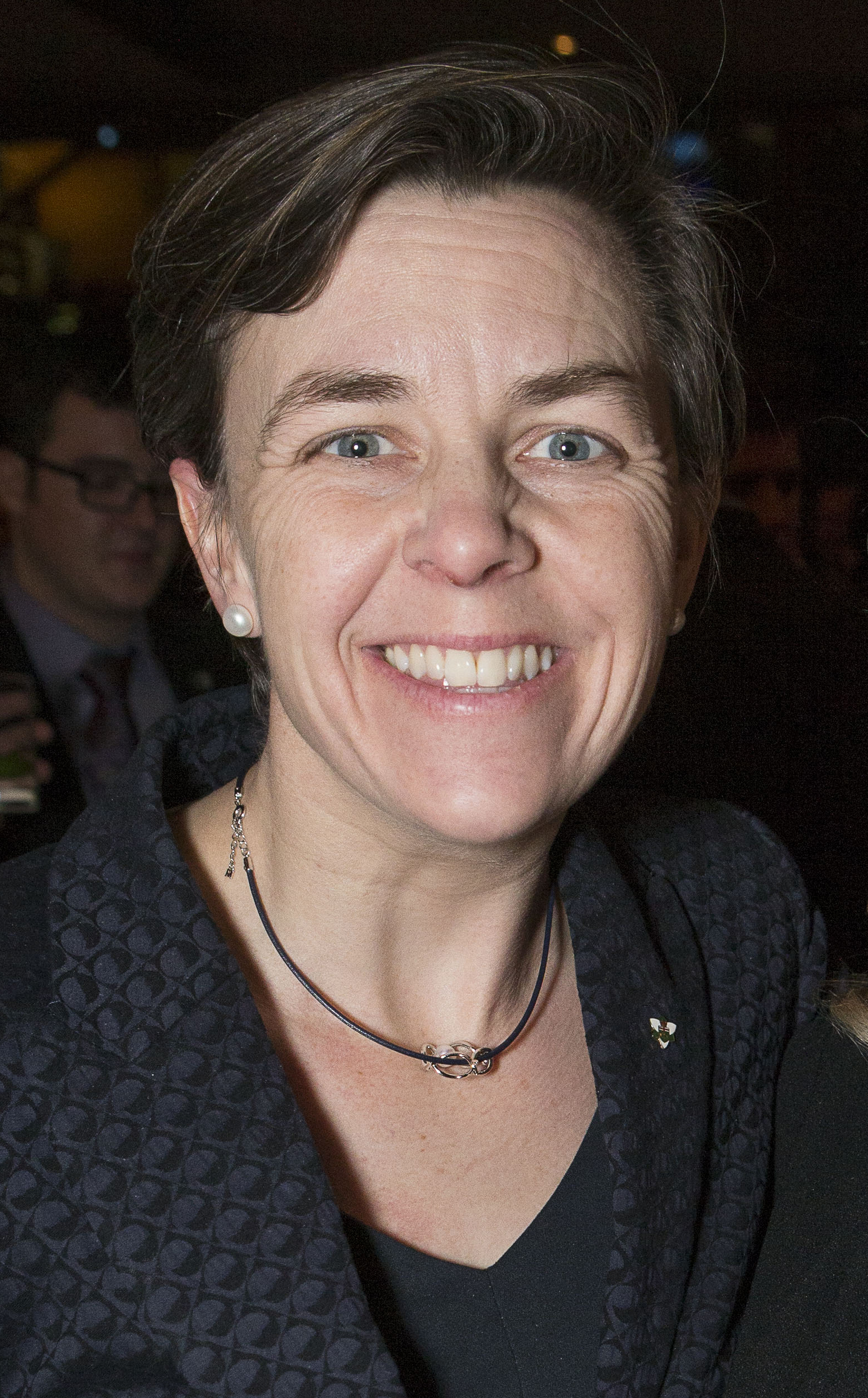
Kellie Leitch

Background

Kellie Leitch, 46, was the MP for Simcoe—Grey, Ontario (2011–2019) and Shadow Minister of Health (2015–2016). In the Harper cabinet, she was Minister of Labour and the Status of Women (2013–2015). She is an orthopaedic pediatric surgeon at SickKids Hospital and an associate professor at the University of Toronto.

Date campaign announced: April 6, 2016

Endorsements of Kellie Leitch

Endorsements
MPs: (3)

- Ben Lobb (Huron—Bruce)
- Peter Van Loan (York—Simcoe)
- David Yurdiga (Fort McMurray—Cold Lake)

Senators:
Provincial politicians:
Municipal politicians:
Former MPs: (1)

- Bob Dechert (Mississauga—Erindale, 2008–2015)

Former Senators: (2)

- Consiglio Di Nino (Ontario, 1990–2012)
- Michael Meighen (Ontario, 1990–2012; Chancellor of McGill University; grandson of Prime Minister Arthur Meighen)

Former provincial politicians:
Former municipal politicians:
Other prominent individuals: (4)

- Richard Ciano (Ontario PC Party President, 2012–2016)
- Nick Kouvalis (Campaign Strategist for Conservative Party of Canada, BC Liberals; Chief of Staff to the Mayor of Toronto, 2010–2011)
- Paul Fromm (director, Canada First Immigration Reform Committee)

Organizations: (2)

- Council of European Canadians although Leitch's campaign has rejected this endorsement.
- Canadian Taxpayers Federation Generation Screwed project

Media:
Withdrawn Endorsements: (5)

- Steve Kent (Newfoundland and Labrador MHA for Mount Pearl North)
- Hugh Segal (Senator for Ontario, 2005–2014)
- Andrew Pringle (Toronto Police Services Board Chair),
- Ronald Atkey (St. Paul's, 1972–1974, 1979–1980)
- Stanley Hartt (Chief of Staff, Prime Minister's Office 1989–1990)

Policies

- Supports the decriminalization, but not legalization, of marijuana. Opposes a national tax on carbon emissions. Has suggested screening prospective immigrants using a "Canadian values" test. Described Donald J. Trump's win of the American presidency as an "exciting message and one that we need delivered in Canada as well." Urged by hundreds of health professionals to honour her medical oath and work against Canada's controversial asbestos industry, remained silent on the issue. Calls for the Canadian Broadcasting Corporation to be defunded and dismantled with the exception of the provision of emergency services to rural and remote parts of Canada.

=== Pierre Lemieux ===
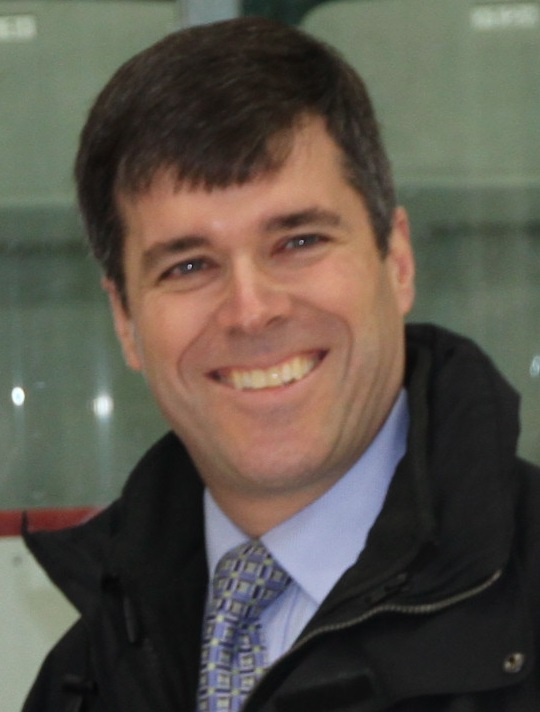
Pierre Lemieux

Background

Pierre Lemieux, 54, is the former MP for Glengarry—Prescott—Russell, Ontario (2006–2015). In the Harper government he was the Parliamentary Secretary for Official Languages (2007–2008), Parliamentary Secretary to the Minister of Agriculture (2008–2015), and Parliamentary Secretary to the Minister of Veterans Affairs (2015).

Date campaign announced: August 22, 2016
Endorsements
MPs:
Senators:
Provincial politicians:
Municipal politicians:
Former MPs:
Former Senators:
Former provincial politicians:
Former municipal politicians:
Other prominent individuals:
Organizations: (3)

- Campaign Life Coalition
- Canadian Taxpayers Federation Generation Screwed project,
- Right Now

Policies

- Running as a social conservative, highlighting his opposition to abortion and same-sex marriage. Lemieux does not believe that screening potential immigration candidates to Canada would make Canada any safer. In March 2017, Pierre Lemieux received a rating of C− from the Canadian Coalition for Firearm Rights for his policies on firearms ownership in Canada.

=== Deepak Obhrai ===
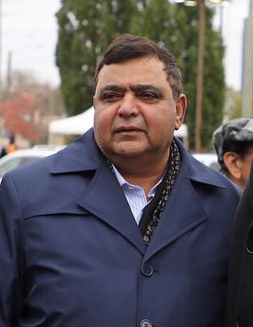
Deepak Obhrai

Background

Deepak Obhrai, 66, was the MP for Calgary Forest Lawn, Alberta (2015–2019), and represented Calgary East, Alberta (1997–2015), was Shadow Minister of International Development (2015–2016), and was the Dean of the Conservative Caucus. In the Harper government he was the Parliamentary Secretary for Foreign Affairs (2006–2015). Obhrai was a member of the Canadian Alliance at the time of the merger.

Date campaign announced: July 14, 2016
Endorsements
MPs:
Senators:
Provincial politicians:
Municipal politicians:
Former MPs: (2)

- Corneliu Chisu (Pickering—Scarborough East, 2011–2015)
- Joe Daniel (Don Valley East, 2011–2015)

Former Senators:
Former provincial politicians:
Former municipal politicians:
Other prominent individuals:
Organizations: (1)

- Canadian Taxpayers Federation Generation Screwed project

Media:
Withdrawn Endorsements: (2)

- Julian Fantino (Former MP for Vaughan, 2010–2015)
- Martin Shields (MP for Bow River)

Policies

- Advocates a more inclusive party. Had promised to withdraw in favour of Peter MacKay if he were to run. He wants to increase the number of privately sponsored refugees and cut the number of government-sponsored refugees.

=== Erin O'Toole ===
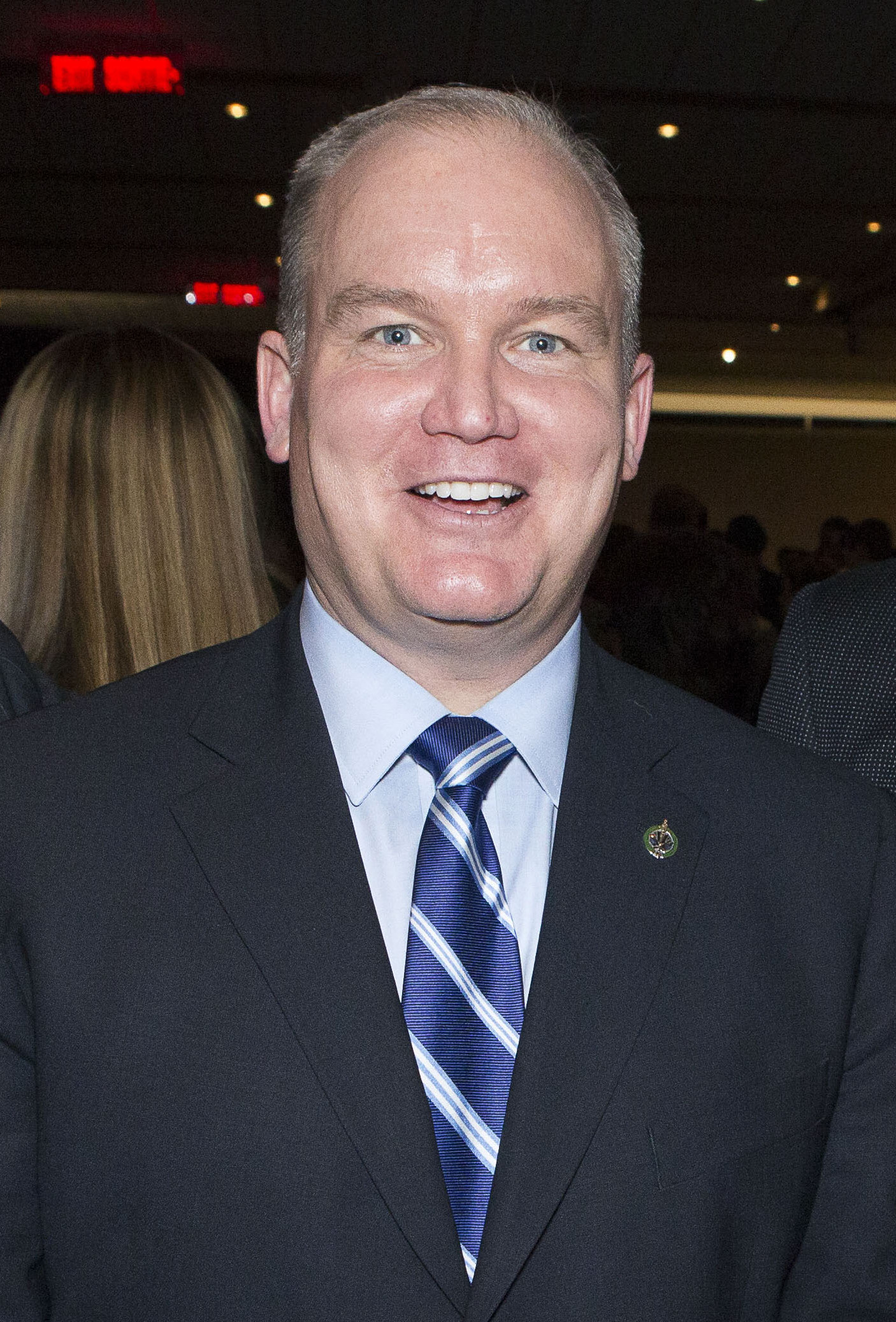
Erin O'Toole

Background

Erin O'Toole, 44, is the MP for Durham, Ontario (2012–2023) and was Shadow Minister of Public Safety and Emergency Preparedness (2015–2016) for the Conservative Party in Opposition. Previously, he served as Minister of Veterans Affairs (2015).

Date campaign announced: October 14, 2016

Endorsements of Erin O'Toole

Endorsements
MPs: (31)

- Harold Albrecht (Kitchener—Conestoga)
- Mel Arnold (North Okanagan—Shuswap)
- Bob Benzen (Calgary Heritage)
- James Bezan (Selkirk—Interlake—Eastman)
- John Brassard (Barrie—Innisfil)
- Blaine Calkins (Red Deer—Lacombe)
- Colin Carrie (Oshawa)
- Michael Cooper (St. Albert—Edmonton)
- Gérard Deltell (Louis-Saint-Laurent)
- Kerry Diotte (Edmonton Griesbach)
- Todd Doherty (Cariboo—Prince George)
- Jim Eglinski (Yellowhead)
- Ed Fast (Abbotsford)
- Joel Godin (Portneuf—Jacques-Cartier)
- Rachael Harder (Lethbridge)
- Randy Hoback (Prince Albert)
- Pat Kelly (Calgary Rocky Ridge)
- Robert Kitchen (Souris—Moose Mountain)
- Ron Liepert (Calgary Signal Hill)
- Larry Maguire (Brandon—Souris)
- Kelly McCauley (Edmonton West)
- Cathy McLeod (Kamloops—Thompson—Cariboo)
- Glen Motz (Medicine Hat—Cardston—Warner)
- Blake Richards (Banff—Airdrie)
- Jamie Schmale (Haliburton—Kawartha Lakes—Brock),
- Martin Shields (Bow River)
- Bev Shipley (Lambton—Kent—Middlesex)
- Robert Sopuck (Dauphin—Swan River—Neepawa)
- Karen Vecchio (Elgin—Middlesex—London)
- Dianne Watts (South Surrey—White Rock)
- Kevin Waugh (Saskatoon—Grasswood)

Senators: (4)

- Nancy Greene Raine (British Columbia)
- Fabian Manning (Newfoundland and Labrador)
- Bob Runciman (Ontario)
- Vernon White (Ontario)

Provincial politicians: (17)

- Bob Bailey (Ontario MPP for Sarnia—Lambton)
- Jamie Baillie (Nova Scotia MLA for Cumberland South; PC Party of Nova Scotia Leader; Leader of the Opposition)
- Lorne Coe (Ontario MPP for Whitby—Oshawa)
- Vic Fedeli (Ontario MPP for Nipissing)
- Michael Harris (Ontario MPP for Kitchener—Conestoga)
- Stacey Hassard (Yukon MLA for Pelly-Nisutlin; Interim Leader of the Yukon Party),
- Wade Istchenko (Yukon MLA for Kluane)
- Scott Kent (Yukon MLA for Copperbelt South)
- Brian Macdonald (New Brunswick MLA for Fredericton West-Hanwell)
- Norm Miller (Ontario MPP for Parry Sound—Muskoka)
- Rick Nicholls (Chatham-Kent—Essex)
- Randy Pettapiece (Ontario MPP for Perth—Wellington)
- Laurie Scott (Ontario MPP for Haliburton—Kawartha Lakes—Brock)
- Todd Smith (Ontario MPP for Prince Edward—Hastings)
- Lisa Thompson (Ontario MPP for Huron—Bruce)
- Bill Walker (Ontario MPP for Bruce—Grey—Owen Sound)
- John Yakabuski (Ontario MPP for Renfrew—Nipissing—Pembroke)

Municipal politicians: (4)

- Nancy Deni (Sudbury Catholic District School Board Trustee for Zone 4)
- Kelly Elliott (Thames Centre Town Councillor for Ward 1)
- Jody Mitic (Ottawa City Councillor for Innes)
- Dave Myette (Saugeen Shores Town Councillor for Saugeen)

Former MPs: (12)

- Diane Ablonczy (Calgary Nose Hill, 1993–2015)
- Ronald Atkey (St. Paul's, 1972–1974, 1979–1980)
- Laurie Hawn (Edmonton Centre, 2006–2015)
- Ed Holder (London West, 2008–2015)
- Randy Kamp (Pitt Meadows—Maple Ridge—Mission, 2004–2015)
- Gerald Keddy (South Shore—St. Margaret's, 1997–2015)
- Wladyslaw Lizon (Mississauga East—Cooksville, 2011–2015)
- Barbara McDougall (St. Paul's, 1984–1993)
- Bill McKnight (Kindersley—Lloydminster, 1979-1993)
- Ted Opitz (Etobicoke Centre, 2011–2015)
- Bernard Trottier (Etobicoke—Lakeshore, 2011–2015)
- David Wilks (Kootenay—Columbia, 2011–2015)

Former Senators: (1)

- Marjory LeBreton (Ontario, 1993-2015)

Former provincial politicians: (6)

- Dave Boushy (Ontario MPP for Sarnia, 1995–1999)
- John Hamm (Nova Scotia MLA for Pictou Centre, 1993–2006; Premier of Nova Scotia, 1999–2006),
- Frank Klees (Ontario MPP for York North, 1995–1999; Oak Ridges, 1999–2007; Newmarket—Aurora, 2007–2014)
- Mike Nixon (Yukon MLA for Porter Creek South, 2011-2016)
- John O'Toole (Ontario MPP for Durham, 1995–2014 and Erin O'Toole's father)
- Bill Saunderson (Ontario MPP for Eglinton, 1995–1999)

Former municipal politicians: (2)

- Michelle Branch (Bathurst City Councillor, 2012–2016)
- Dean Drysdale (Langley Municipal Councillor, 1996–2002)

Other prominent individuals: (3)

- David Bertschi (Liberal Party of Canada Leadership Contestant, 2013)
- Ted Laking (Chief of Staff to the Yukon Leader of the Opposition)
- Dan Lindsay (College of Physicians and Surgeons of Manitoba President; Conservative Party of Canada Leadership Contestant, 2017)

Organizations: (1)

- CANZUK International

Media:

Policies

O'Toole policies wants to give tax credits for youth underemployment and student debt. He wants to restructure temporary foreign worker and provincial nominee programs.

=== Rick Peterson ===
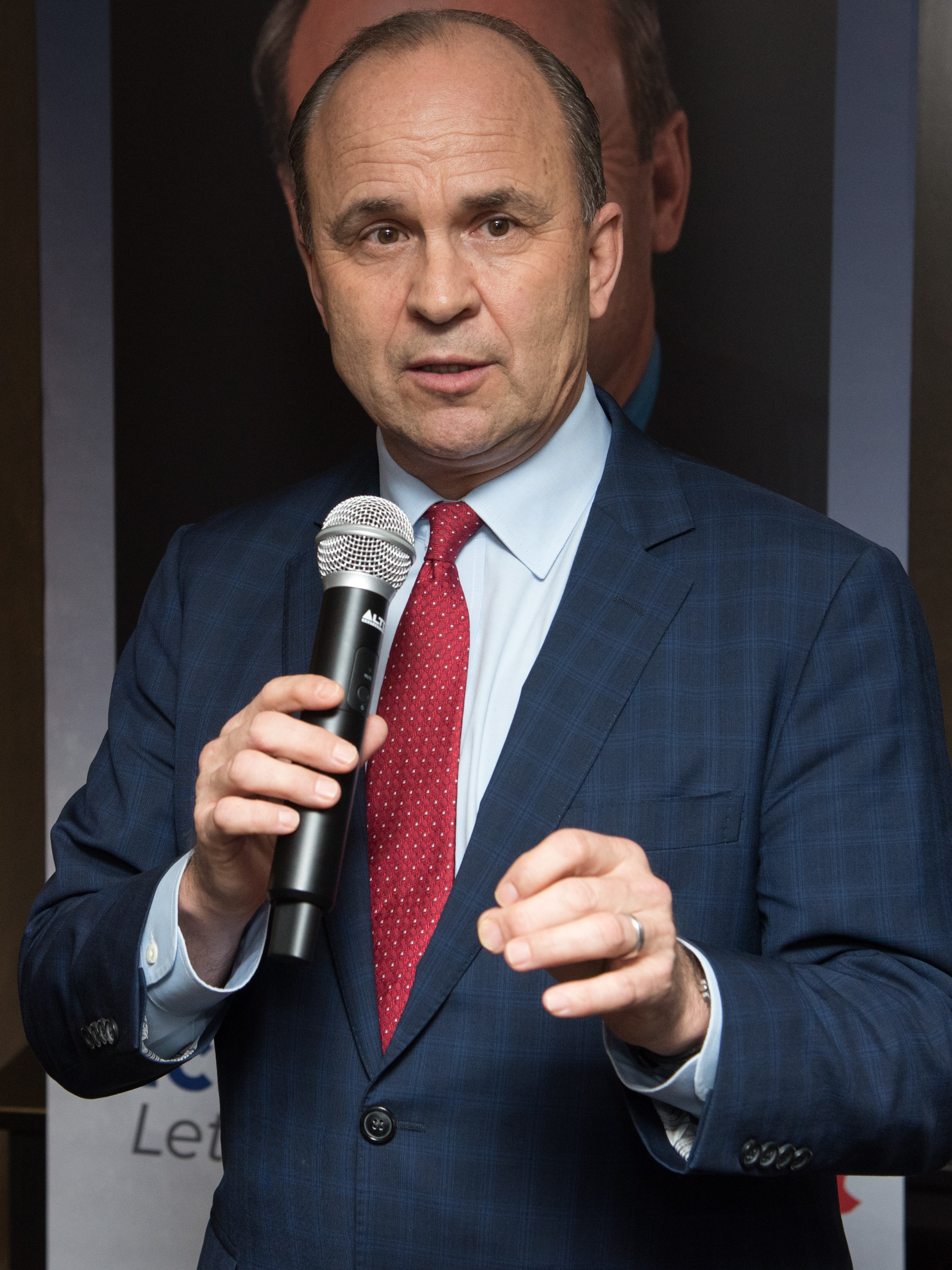
Rick Peterson

Background

Rick Peterson, 61, is a venture capitalist, party fundraiser, the principal of Peterson Capital, and a former candidate for leadership of the British Columbia Conservative Party. He was a member of the Progressive Conservatives at the time of the merger.

Date campaign announced: October 18, 2016
Endorsements
MPs:
Senators:
Provincial politicians:
Municipal politicians:
Former MPs: (1)

- Bill Clarke (Vancouver Quadra, 1973–1984)

Former Senators:
Former provincial politicians:
Former municipal politicians:
Other prominent individuals: (3)

- Brian Day (Canadian Medical Association President, 2006–2008)
- Karen Mortfield (Press Secretary to the Ontario PC Leader, 1990–1993)
- Mark Mullins (Former Fraser Institute President)

Organizations: (1)

- Canadian Taxpayers Federation Generation Screwed project

Policies

- Advocates a flat federal income tax rate of 15% and eliminating corporate income taxes and raising the GST to 9%. Supports boosting terrorist surveillance and enhance security screening for immigrants.
- Advocates offering citizenship to almost 250,000 skilled workers a year by 2022, triple today's levels, and to 35,000 business people, more than five times today's level while freezing refugee integration to the levels of Harper Era.
- Would reform health care provincial transfer payments and equalization payments.
- Calls for Canada Revenue Agency to withdraw from Quebec and to transfer the administration and collection of the income tax in the province to Revenue Quebec.
- Would take Canada out of the UN firearms marking scheme and to allow open carry of restricted firearms in the bush. Received a rating of C− from the Canadian Coalition for Firearm Rights for his policies and a rating of C from the National Firearms Association.

=== Lisa Raitt ===
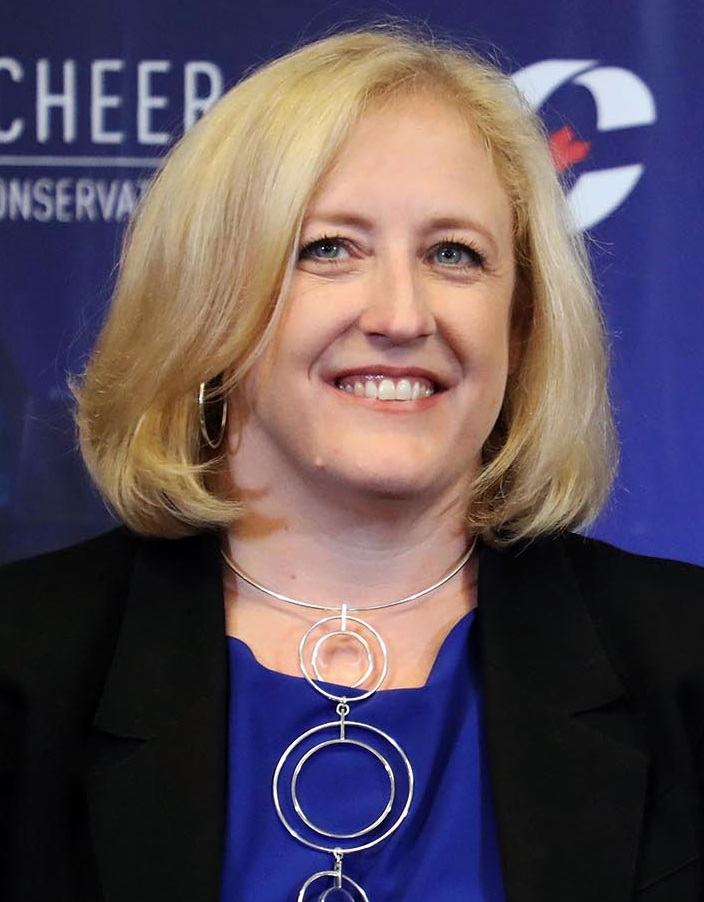
Lisa Raitt

Background

Lisa Raitt, 49, was the MP for Milton, Ontario (2015–2019), previously Halton, Ontario (2008–2015) and the former Shadow Minister of Finance (2015–2016), Minister of Transport (2013–2015), Minister of Labour (2010–2013), Minister of Natural Resources (2008–2010), President and CEO of the Toronto Port Authority (2002–2008). Stepped down from shadow cabinet on October 14, 2016, to prepare for leadership bid.

Date campaign announced: November 2, 2016

Endorsements of Lisa Raitt

Endorsements
MPs: (3)

- Dean Allison (Niagara West)
- Phil McColeman (Brantford—Brant)
- Bruce Stanton (Simcoe North)

Senators: (1)

- Judith Seidman (Quebec)

Provincial politicians: (3)

- Alfie MacLeod (Nova Scotia MLA for Sydney River-Mira-Louisbourg)
- Lisa MacLeod (Ontario MPP for Nepean—Carleton)
- Eddie Orrell (Nova Scotia MLA for Northside-Westmount)

Municipal politicians: (4)

- Cecil Clarke (Mayor of Cape Breton RM)
- Mike Cluett (Halton Regional Councillor for Milton South)
- Gordon Krantz (Mayor of Milton) Michel Plourde (Mayor of Danville)

Former MPs: (12)

- Scott Armstrong (Cumberland—Colchester—Musquodoboit Valley, 2009–2015)
- Keith Ashfield (Frederiction, 2008–2015)
- John Carmichael (Don Valley West, 2011–2015)
- Rob Clarke (Desnethé—Missinippi—Churchill River, 2008–2015)
- Mary Collins (Capilano—Howe Sound, 1984–1993)
- Kerry-Lynne Findlay (Delta, 2011–2015)
- Paul Forseth (New Westminster—Coquitlam, 1993–2006)
- Robert Goguen (Moncton—Riverview—Dieppe, 2011–2015)
- Gary Goodyear (Cambridge, 2004–2015)
- Dick Harris (Cariboo—Prince George, 1993–2015) Ted Menzies (Macleod, 2004–2013
- Darrel Stinson (Okanagan—Shuswap, 1993–2006)

Former Senators: (1)

- Hugh Segal (Ontario, 2005-2014)

Former provincial politicians: (6)

- Keith Bain (Nova Scotia MLA for Victoria-The Lakes, 2006–2013),
- Currie Dixon (Yukon MLA for Copperbelt North, 2011–2016)
- Phil Gillies (Ontario MPP for Brantford, 1981–1987)
- Rodney MacDonald (Nova Scotia MLA for Inverness, 1999-2009; Premier of Nova Scotia, 2006-2009)
- Darrell Pasloski (Yukon MLA for Mountainview, 2011–2016; Premier of Yukon, 2011–2016)
- John Snobelen (Ontario MPP for Mississauga West, 1995–2003)

Former municipal politicians: (1)

- Case Ootes (Toronto City Councillor for Toronto—Danforth, 1998–2010; Deputy Mayor of Toronto, 1998–2003)

Other prominent individuals: (1)

- Kinsey Schurm (Ontario PC Youth Association President)

Organizations: (1)

Canadian Taxpayers Federation's Generation Screwed project

Media: (3)

- Mark Bonokoski (Toronto Sun Columnist)
- John Ivison (National Post Columnist)
- Rick Salutin (Toronto Star Columnist)

Policies
Opposes Leitch's proposal to screen immigrants for "anti-Canadian values". She will "introduce balanced budgets, repeal carbon pricing legislation and prioritize the development of Canada's natural resources."

- Firearms policy. In March 2017, Raitt received a rating of C+ from the Canadian Coalition for Firearms Rights for her policies on firearms ownership in Canada. In April, she received a rating of D from the National Firearms Association.

=== Andrew Saxton ===
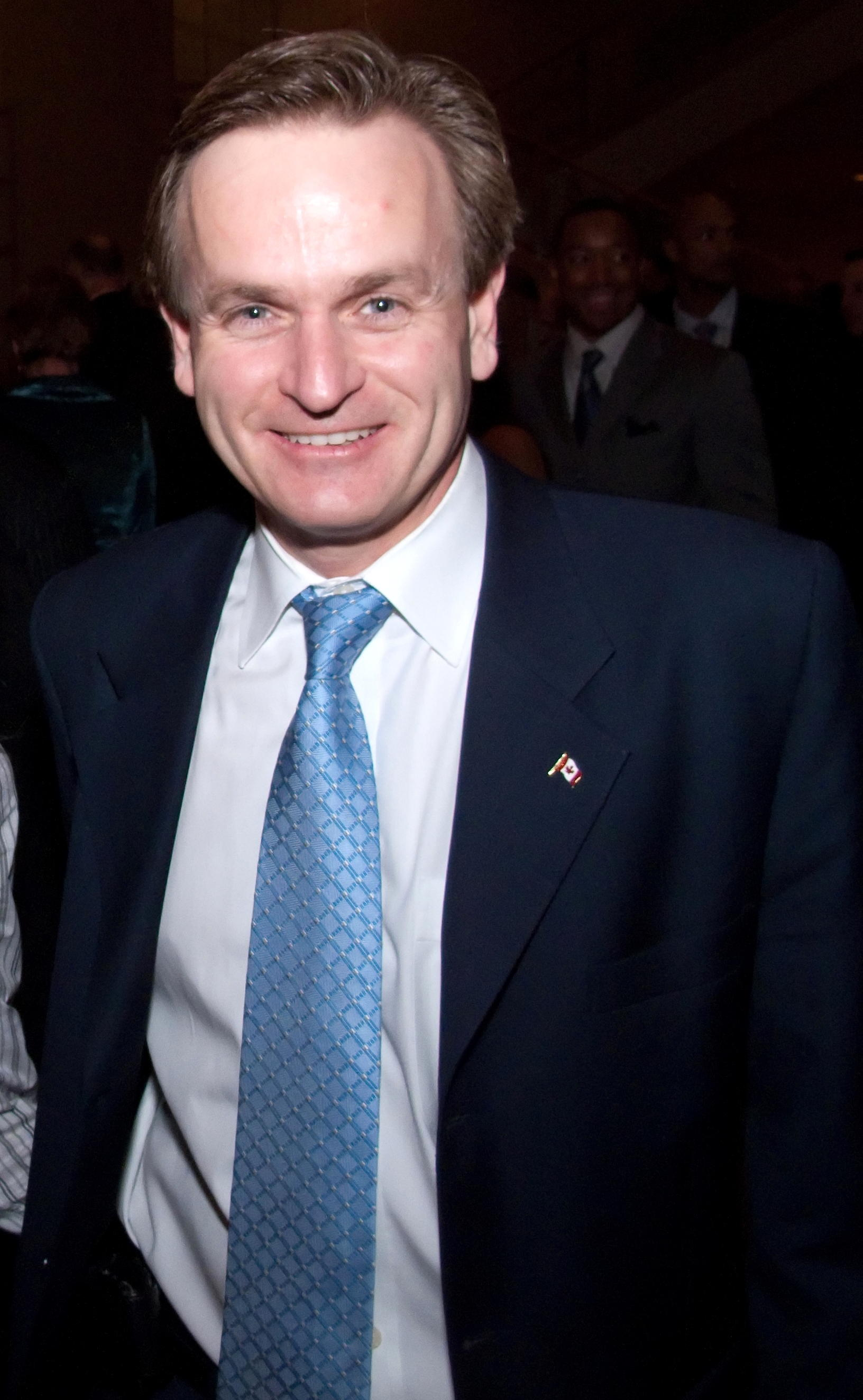
Andrew Saxton

Background

Andrew Saxton, 53, is the former Parliamentary Secretary to the Minister of Finance (2013–2015), Parliamentary Secretary to the President of the Treasury Board and for Western Economic Diversification (2011–2013), MP for North Vancouver (2008–2015), former chief executive officer of King George Financial Corporation.

Date campaign announced: October 18, 2016
Endorsements
MPs:
Senators:
Provincial politicians:
Municipal politicians:
Former MPs: (3)

- Joyce Bateman (Winnipeg South Centre, 2011–2015)
- John Duncan (Vancouver Island North, 1993–2006, 2008–2015)
- John Fraser (Vancouver South, 1972–1993; Speaker of the House of Commons, 1986–1993)

Former Senators: (1)

- Noël Kinsella (New Brunswick, 1990–2014; Speaker of the Senate, 2006–2014)

Former provincial politicians:
Former municipal politicians:
Other prominent individuals:
Organizations: (1)

- Canadian Taxpayers Federation Generation Screwed project

Media: (1)

- David Holmes Black (Black Press Owner)

Policies

Saxton's campaign is an economic platform. He plans on lowering taxes and balancing the budget.

=== Andrew Scheer ===
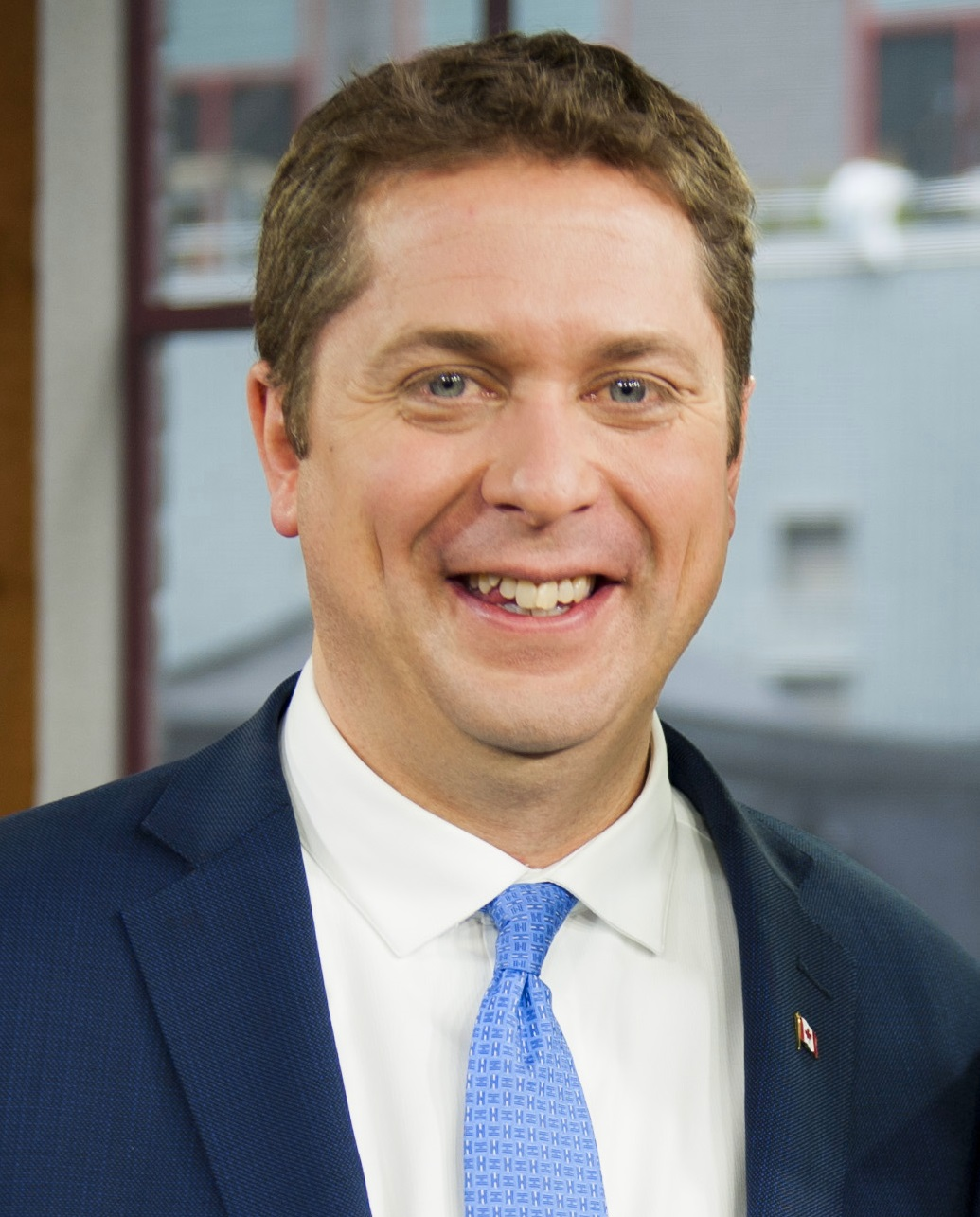
Andrew Scheer

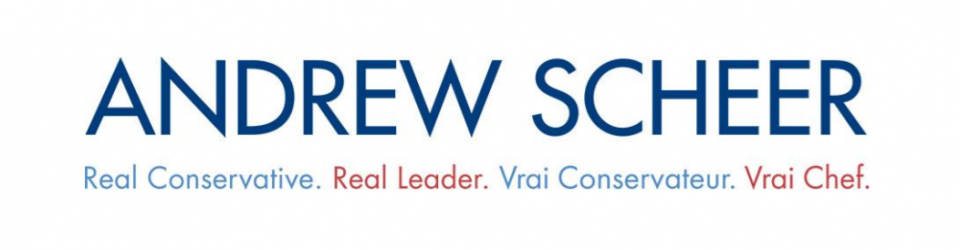
Campaign logo

Background

Andrew Scheer, 38, Opposition House Leader (2015–2016), MP for Regina—Qu'Appelle, Saskatchewan (2004–present), Speaker of the House of Commons (2011–2015). Scheer was a member of the Canadian Alliance at the time of the merger.

Date campaign announced: September 28, 2016

Endorsements of Andrew Scheer

Endorsements
MPs: (24)

- Ziad Aboultaif (Edmonton Manning)
- David Anderson (Cypress Hills—Grasslands)
- John Barlow (Foothills)
- Luc Berthold (Mégantic—L'Érable)
- Kelly Block (Carlton Trail—Eagle Creek)
- Sylvie Boucher (Beauport—Côte-de-Beaupré—Île d'Orléans—Charlevoix)
- Ted Falk (Provencher)
- Garnett Genuis (Sherwood Park—Fort Saskatchewan)
- Marilyn Gladu (Sarnia—Lambton)
- Matt Jeneroux (Edmonton Riverbend)
- Tom Lukiwski (Moose Jaw—Lake Centre—Lanigan)
- Pierre Paul-Hus (Charlesbourg—Haute-Saint-Charles)
- Alain Rayes (Richmond—Arthabaska)
- Scott Reid (Lanark—Frontenac—Kingston)
- Gerry Ritz (Battlefords—Lloydminster)
- Bob Saroya (Markham—Unionville)
- Kevin Sorenson (Battle River—Crowfoot)
- Mark Strahl (Chilliwack—Hope)
- Shannon Stubbs (Lakeland)
- Arnold Viersen (Peace River—Westlock)
- Cathay Wagantall (Yorkton—Melville)
- Mark Warawa (Langley—Aldergrove)
- Chris Warkentin (Grande Prairie-Mackenzie)
- Bob Zimmer (Prince George—Peace River—Northern Rockies)

Senators: (8)

- Denise Batters (Saskatchewan)
- Norman Doyle (Newfoundland and Labrador)
- Dennis Patterson (Nunavut)
- Don Plett (Manitoba)
- Carolyn Stewart-Olsen (New Brunswick)
- Scott Tannas (Alberta)
- David Tkachuk (Saskatchewan)
- Betty Unger (Alberta)

Provincial politicians: (29)

- Wayne Anderson (Alberta MLA for Highwood)
- Steven Bonk (Saskatchewan MLA for Moosomin)
- Bill Boyd (Saskatchewan MLA for Kindersley)
- Fred Bradshaw (Saskatchewan MLA for Carrot River Valley)
- Greg Brkich (Saskatchewan MLA for Arm River),
- Jennifer Campeau (Saskatchewan MLA for Saskatoon Fairview),
- Jeff Carr (New Brunswick MLA for New Maryland-Sunbury)
- Lori Carr (Saskatchewan MLA for Estevan)
- Nathan Cooper (Alberta MLA for Olds-Didsbury-Three Hills)
- Herb Cox (Saskatchewan MLA for The Battlefords)
- Dan D'Autremont (Saskatchewan MLA for Cannington)
- Terry Dennis (Saskatchewan MLA for Canora-Pelly)
- Glenn van Dijken (Alberta MLA for Barrhead-Morinville-Westlock)
- Larry Doke (Saskatchewan MLA for Cut Knife-Turtleford)
- Dave Hanson (Alberta MLA for Lac La Biche-St. Paul-Two Hills)
- Jeremy Harrison (Saskatchewan MLA for Meadow Lake)
- Larry Harrison (Nova Scotia MLA for Colchester-Musquodoboit Valley)
- Warren Kaeding (Saskatchewan MLA for Melville-Saltcoats)
- Greg Lawrence (Saskatchewan MLA for Moose Jaw Wakamow)
- Monte McNaughton (Ontario MPP for Lambton—Kent—Middlesex)
- Hugh Nerlien (Saskatchewan MLA for Kelvington-Wadena)
- Greg Ottenbreit (Saskatchewan MLA for Yorkton)
- Kevin Phillips (Saskatchewan MLA for Melfort)
- Doug Steele (Saskatchewan MLA for Cypress Hills)
- Warren Steinley (Saskatchewan MLA for Regina Walsh Acres)
- Lyle Stewart (Saskatchewan MLA for Lumsden-Morse)
- Christine Tell (Saskatchewan MLA for Regina Wascana Plains)
- Carl Urquhart (New Brunswick MLA for Carleton-York)
- Randy Weekes (Saskatchewan MLA for Biggar-Sask Valley)

Former MPs: (16)

- Mike Allen (Tobique—Mactaquac, 2006-2015)
- Garry Breitkreuz (Yorkton—Melville, 1993–2015)
- Paul Calandra (Oak Ridges—Markham, 2008–2015)
- Royal Galipeau (Ottawa—Orléans, 2006–2015)
- Bal Gosal (Bramalea—Gore—Malton, 2011–2015),
- Jim Gouk (British Columbia Southern Interior, 1993–2006)
- Bryan Hayes (Sault Ste. Marie, 2011–2015)
- Costas Menegakis (Richmond Hill)
- Tilly O'Neill-Gordon (Miramichi, 2008–2015)
- LaVar Payne (Medicine Hat, 2008–2015)
- Peter Penashue (Labrador, 2011–2013)
- Kyle Seeback (Brampton West, 2011–2015)
- Gail Shea (Egmont, 2008–2015)
- Devinder Shory (Calgary Northeast, 2008–2015)
- Chuck Strahl (Chilliwack—Fraser Canyon, 1993–2011)
- Jeff Watson (Essex, 2004–2015)

Former provincial politicians: (1)

- Shayne Saskiw (Alberta MLA for Lac La Biche-St. Paul-Two Hills, 2012–2015)

Former municipal politicians: (2)

- Kenny Chiu (Richmond School District Trustee, 2011-2014)
- Shari Green (Mayor of Prince George, 2011-2014)

Other prominent individuals: (1)

- Stephen Taylor (Former National Director of the National Citizens Coalition, NewsHubNation)

Organizations: (3)

- Canadian Taxpayers Federation Generation Screwed project
- Dairy Farmers of Quebec
- Right Now

Media: (1)

- Michael Taube (Troy Media Columnist; Radio Host)

Withdrawn endorsements: (4)

- Kelly McCauley (MP for Edmonton West)
- Jim Eglinski (MP for Yellowhead)
- Don MacIntyre (Alberta MLA for Innisfail-Sylvan Lake)
- David Wells (Senator for Newfoundland and Labrador)

Policies

Running as an "unapologetic" Conservative who can unite all wings of the party. He is "committed" to lower taxes, fiscal responsibility, and "compassion". Scheer believes that there should be a "more robust screening process." Scheer is pro-life, but doesn't intend to bring any legislation on the topic. Scheer advocates for immigration based process, economic indicators, and "what our society needs."

=== Brad Trost ===
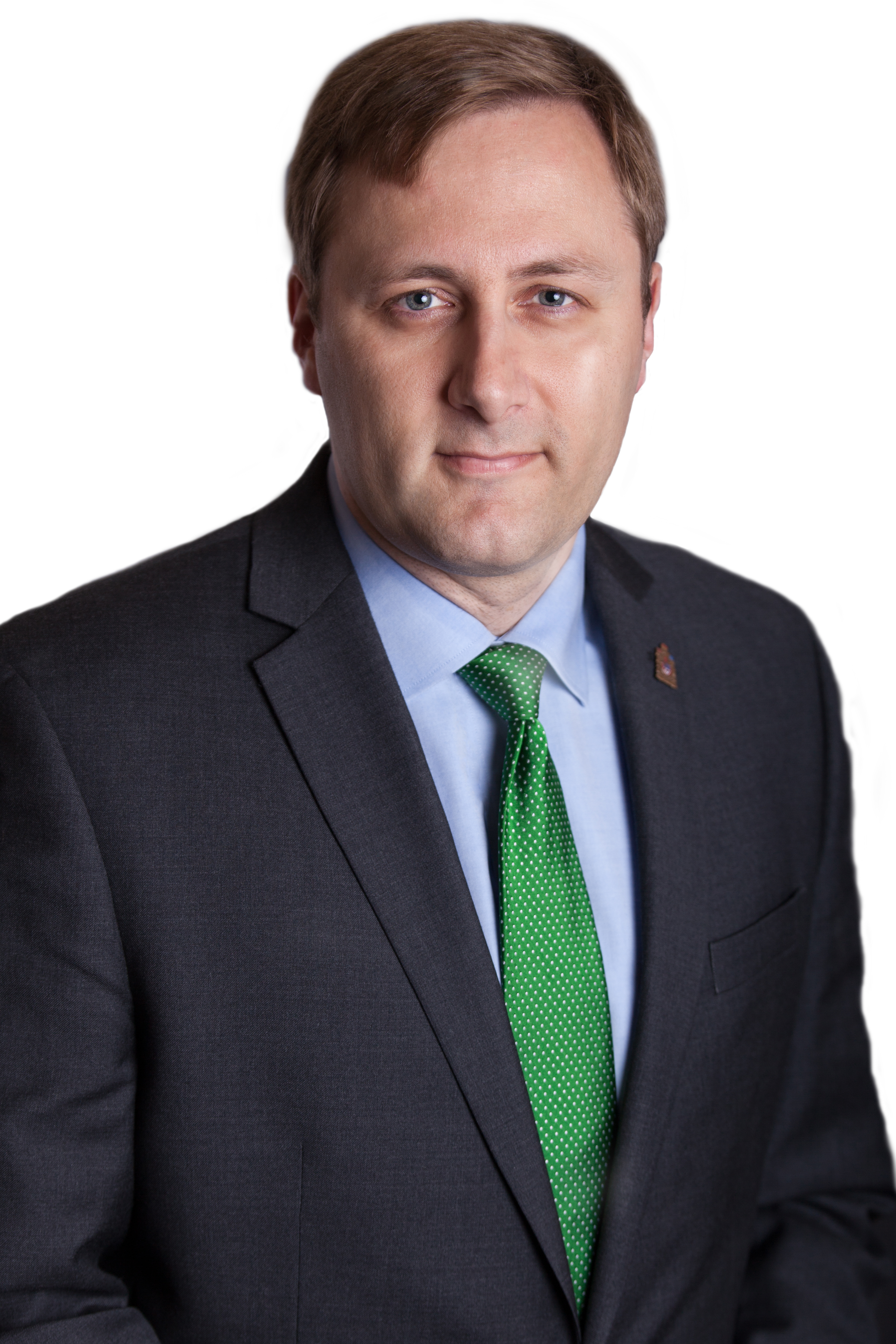
Brad Trost

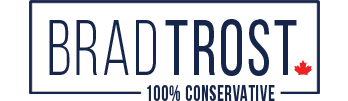
Campaign logo

Background

Brad Trost, 43, was the MP for Saskatoon—University, (2015–2019) and Saskatoon—Humboldt (2004–2015) previously. He was appointed Official Opposition Critic for Canada-U.S. Relations (2015–2016) following the 2015 election. Prior to election, Trost worked as an exploration geophysicist (prospector) in natural resources extraction in the north. He was also an active participant in his family's mixed grain, oilseeds and beef cattle farm operation. In his first Parliament, he founded the Conservative Party Energy Caucus and pushed for the re-creation of the Standing Committee on Natural Resources. He has served on the Standing Committees on International Trade and on Industry, and was elected vice-chair of the Canada-U.S. Parliamentary Association.

Date campaign announced: August 16, 2016
Endorsements
MPs:
Senators:
Provincial politicians:
Municipal politicians:
Former MPs: (2)

- Leon Benoit (Vegreville—Wainwright, 1993–2015),
- Maurice Vellacott (Saskatoon—Wanuskewin, 1997–2015)

Former provincial politicians:
Former municipal politicians:
Other prominent individuals:
Organizations: (2)

- Campaign Life Coalition,
- Canadian Taxpayers Federation Generation Screwed project

Media:
Policies

- Running as a social conservative, opposes a carbon tax, transgender bathrooms, tax increases generally, assisted suicide and abortion, deficit financing, and legalization of marijuana. Has been outspoken against abortion and against same-sex marriage and argued unsuccessfully at the 2016 Conservative policy convention to retain the party's definition of marriage as "the Union of one man and one woman". Advocates privatization of the Canadian Broadcasting Corporation.

== Withdrawn candidates ==
=== Tony Clement ===
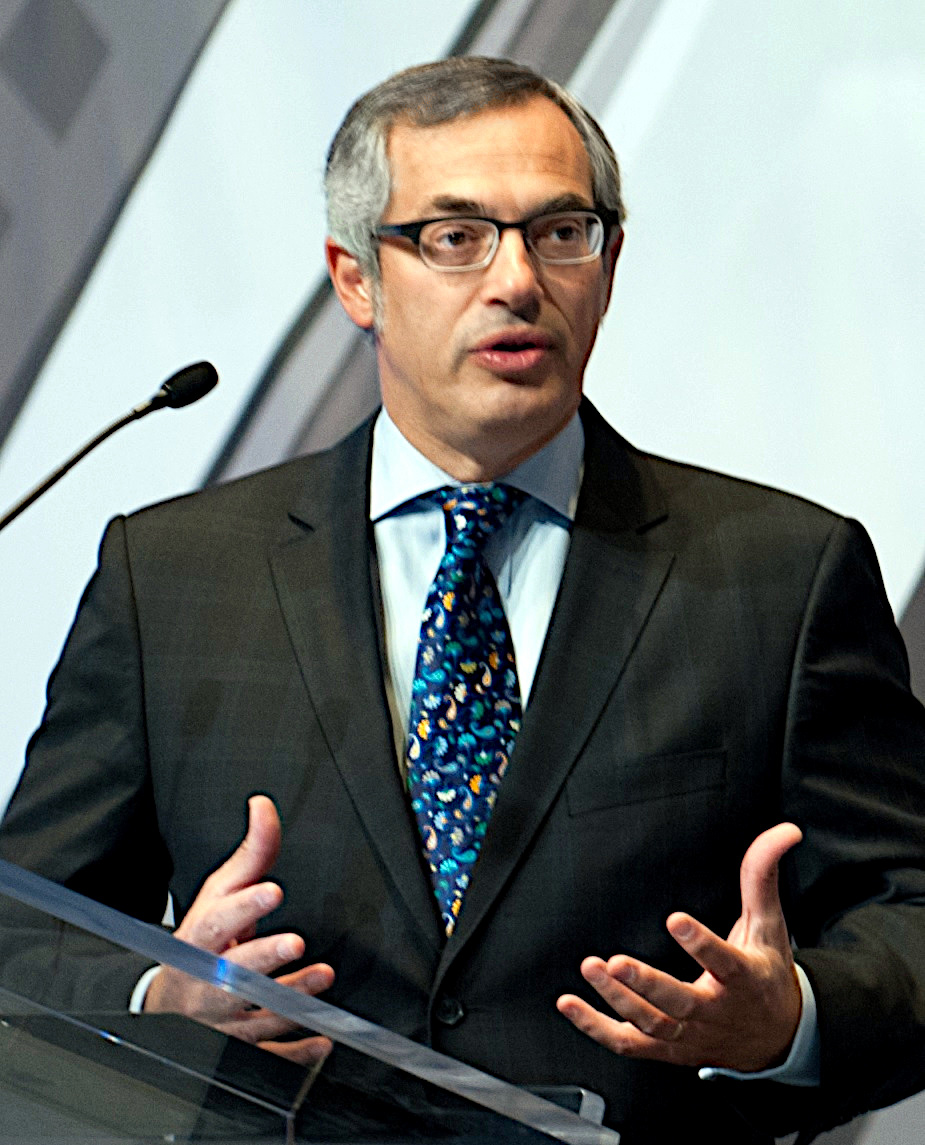
Tony Clement

Background

Tony Clement, 56, is the MP for Parry Sound-Muskoka, Ontario (2006–2019) and has been Shadow Minister of Foreign Affairs (2015–2016), President of the Treasury Board (2011–2015), Minister of Industry (2008–2011), Minister of Health (2006–2008), and a 2004 leadership candidate, placing third. He was an MPP in the Ontario legislature (1995–2003) and a provincial cabinet minister (1997–2003) under Premiers Mike Harris and Ernie Eves. Clement also ran for the leadership of the Progressive Conservative Party of Ontario in 2002, placing third.

Date campaign announced: July 12, 2016
Date withdrawn: October 12, 2016
Endorsements
MPs:
Senators: (1)

- Leo Housakos (Quebec; Speaker of the Senate, 2015)

Provincial politicians:
Municipal politicians:
Former MPs: (1)

- Brad Butt (Mississauga—Streetsville, 2011–2015)

Former Senators:
Former provincial politicians: (1)

- Gary Mar (Alberta MLA for Calgary Nose Creek, 1993–2004, and Calgary-Mackay, 2004–2007)

Former municipal politicians: (1)

- Stephen Sparling (Halton Regional Councillor for Oakville, 1991–2000)

Other prominent individuals: (2)

- Sandra Buckler (Director of Communications, Prime Minister's Office 2006–2008),
- John Capobianco (FleishmanHillard National Lead)

Organizations:
Media:
Other information

- Said he would bring in coherent environmental policies in the wake of the Paris climate change accord, end government subsidies to the Canadian Broadcasting Corporation. Withdrew after he was unable to meet fundraising targets he'd set for his campaign.
- Later endorsed Maxime Bernier.

=== Daniel Lindsay ===
Background

Daniel Lindsay, 60, president of the College of Physicians and Surgeons of Manitoba, radiologist, has done five tours as a civilian medical specialist with the Canadian Armed Forces, including in Kandahar, Afghanistan.

Date campaign announced: May 25, 2016
Date withdrawn: December 28, 2016
Endorsements
MPs:
Senators: (1)

- Betty Unger (Alberta)

Provincial politicians:
Municipal politicians:
Former MPs:
Former Senators:
Former provincial politicians:
Former municipal politicians:
Other prominent individuals:
Organizations:
Media:
Other information
Withdrew after he was unable to fundraise enough money to meet December 31 deadline for paying the party the $50,000 leadership campaign compliance fee.
Later endorsed Erin O'Toole.

=== Kevin O'Leary ===
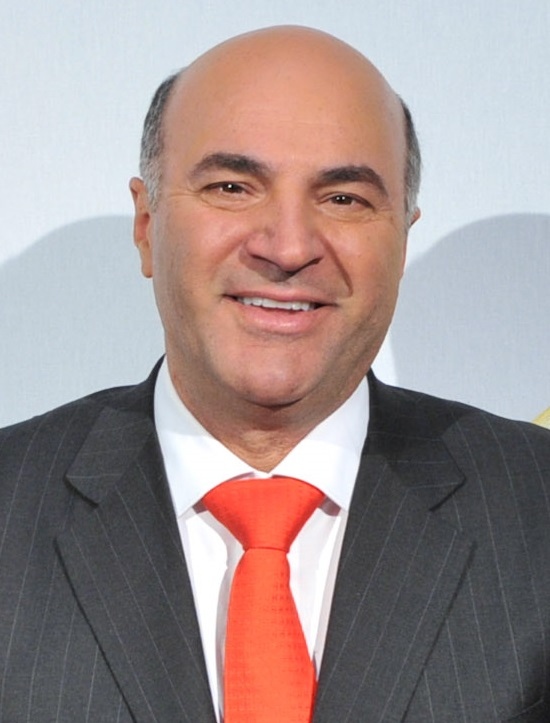
Kevin O'Leary

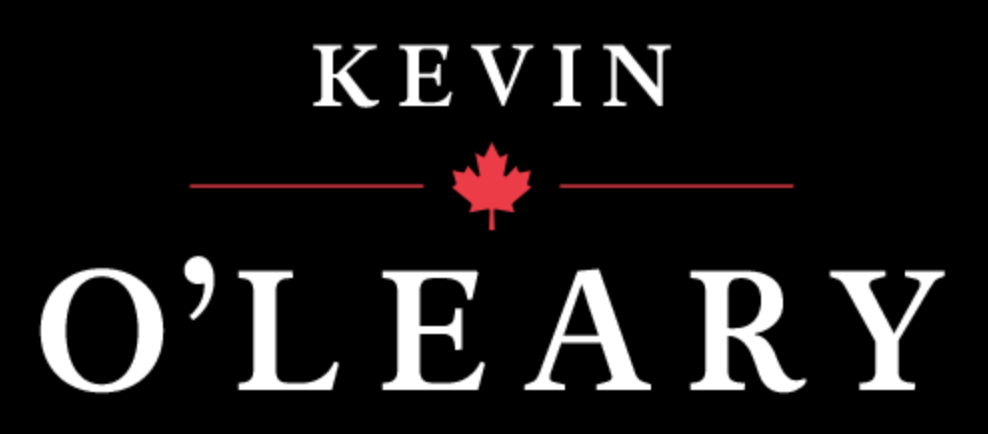
Campaign logo

Kevin O'Leary, 62, is a businessman, investor, journalist, writer, financial commentator and Emmy award-winning television personality.

Endorsements of Kevin O'Leary

Endorsements
MPs: (2)

- Guy Lauzon (Stormont—Dundas—South Glengarry)
- Len Webber (Calgary Confederation)

Senators: (2)

- Percy Mockler (New Brunswick)
- David Wells (Newfoundland and Labrador)

Provincial politicians: (2)

- Steve Clark (Ontario MPP for Leeds—Grenville)
- Karla MacFarlane (Nova Scotia MLA for Pictou West)

Municipal politicians:
Former MPs: (4)

- Julian Fantino (Vaughan, 2010–2015)
- Ken Hughes (Macleod, 1988–1993)
- Tim Uppal (Edmonton—Sherwood Park, 2008–2015)
- Bernard Valcourt (Madawaska—Victoria, 1988–1993; Madawaska—Restigouche, 2011–2015)

Former Senators: (1)

- Marjory LeBreton (Ontario, 1993–2015)

Former provincial politicians: (2)

- Mike Harris (Ontario MPP for Nipissing, 1981–2002; Premier of Ontario, 1995–2002)
- Peter Sandhu (Alberta MLA for Edmonton-Manning, 2008–2015)

Former municipal politicians:
Other prominent individuals: (8)

- Francesco Aquilini (businessman, investor, and philanthropist)
- Andrew Boddington (Ontario PC Party Executive Director, 2012–2014)
- John Capobianco (FleishmanHillard National Lead)
- Amanda Galbraith (Director of Communications to the Mayor of Toronto, 2014–2016)
- Sara MacIntyre (Press Secretary, Prime Minister's Office 2009–2012)
- Peter McQuaid (President of the PEI PC Party, 2014–2015)
- Doug Schweitzer (Manitoba PC Party Executive Director, 2008–2009)
- W. Brett Wilson (Dragons' Den Panelist, 2008–2011)

Organizations: (1)

- Canadian Taxpayers Federation Generation Screwed project

Media: (1)

- Christopher Wilson (Rebel Media Commentator)

Policies

O'Leary supported using a "big stick" federally in order to bring provincial governments in-line with federal policies, cutting waste in military spending, supports a peacekeeping role for the military, cutting carbon emissions through criminal sanctions rather than a carbon tax, supports current immigration policy but also wishes to "fast-track" the citizenship applications of skilled immigrants, asserted he would support LGBTQI people, legalize marijuana and defend reproductive rights.

Date campaign announced: January 18, 2017
Date withdrawn: April 26, 2017
Other information
O'Leary withdrew from the election despite polls showing he was the frontrunner. He stated that while he believed he could win the leadership election, he would be unable to defeat Justin Trudeau in the next federal election due to his inability to speak French fluently and his lack of support in Quebec. He endorsed Maxime Bernier. As his withdrawal took place after the deadline, O'Leary remained on the final leadership ballot.

=== Adrienne Snow ===
Background

Adrienne Snow, 49, Toronto-based communications consultant, former director of policy for National Foundation for Family Research and Education. Former executive director of Centre for the Study of Civic Renewal. Announced on August 23, 2016, that she intended to be a candidate but failed to register and announced in January that she was ending her campaign.

Date campaign announced: August 23, 2016
Date withdrawn: January 4, 2017

== Declined ==
- Rona Ambrose – Interim Leader of the CPC and Leader of the Official Opposition (2015–2017), MP for Sturgeon River—Parkland (2015–2017) and Edmonton—Spruce Grove, Alberta (2004–2015), Minister of Health (2013–2015), Minister of Public Works and Government Services (2010–2013), Minister of Labour (2008–2010), Minister of Intergovernmental Affairs (2007–2008), Minister of the Environment (2006–2007). Ambrose is barred from running for permanent leader due to her position as interim leader and has declined interest in the permanent position.
- John Baird – MP for Ottawa West—Nepean, Ontario (2006–2015), Minister of Foreign Affairs (2011–2015), Leader of the Government in the House of Commons (2010–2011), Minister of the Environment (2007–2008, 2010–2011), Minister of Transport (2008–2010), President of the Treasury Board, (2006–2007), Ontario Progressive Conservative Party MPP (1995–2005) and provincial cabinet minister (1999–2003).
- Candice Bergen – Opposition House Leader (2016–2020), Shadow Minister of Natural Resources (2015–2016), State for Social Development (2013–2015), MP for Portage—Lisgar, Manitoba (2008–2023).
- Paul Calandra – Parliamentary Secretary to the Prime Minister of Canada and for Intergovernmental Affairs (2013–2015), MP for Oak Ridges—Markham, Ontario (2008–2015) Endorsed Scheer.
- Jean Charest – Premier of Quebec (2003–2012), Leader of the Quebec Liberal Party (1998–2012), Leader of the Progressive Conservative Party of Canada (1993–1998), Deputy Prime Minister of Canada (1993), Minister of the Environment (1991–1993), MP for Sherbrooke (1984–1998)
- Christy Clark – Premier of British Columbia (2011–2017), Leader of the B.C. Liberal Party (2011–2017)
- Gérard Deltell – Quebec lieutenant and Shadow Finance Minister (2016–2017), Shadow Minister of Employment and Workforce Labour (2015–2016), MP for Louis-Saint-Laurent, Quebec (2015–present), Quebec MNA for Chauveau (2008–2015) and leader of the Action démocratique du Québec (2009–2012). Endorsed O'Toole.
- Ed Fast – Shadow Minister for the Environment (2015–2019), MP for Abbotsford, British Columbia (2006–2025), Minister of International Trade (2011–2015). Endorsed O'Toole.
- Doug Ford – former Toronto city councillor (2010–2014) and mayoral candidate (2014).
- Daniel Fournier – real estate development and investor.
- Jason Kenney – Chair of Shadow Cabinet Committee on Strategic Operations (2015–2016), MP for Calgary Midnapore, Alberta (2015–2016) and Calgary Southeast, Alberta (1997–2015), Minister of National Defence (2015), Minister for Multiculturalism (2013–2015), Minister of Employment and Social Development (2013–2015), Minister of Citizenship and Immigration (2008–2013)
- Bernard Lord – Premier of New Brunswick (1999–2006), Leader of the Progressive Conservative Party of New Brunswick (1997–2006)
- Peter MacKay – MP for Central Nova, Nova Scotia (2004–2015) and Pictou—Antigonish—Guysborough, Nova Scotia (1997–2004), Minister of Justice and Attorney General (2013–2015), Minister of National Defence (2007–2013), Minister of Foreign Affairs (2006–2007), Leader of the Progressive Conservative Party (2003)
- Caroline Mulroney – investment management executive, daughter of former prime minister Brian Mulroney.
- Mark Mulroney – head of capital equity markets at the National Bank of Canada, son of former prime minister Brian Mulroney.
- James Moore – MP for Port Moody—Coquitlam—Port Coquitlam, British Columbia (2000–2004) and Port Moody—Westwood—Port Coquitlam, British Columbia (2004–2015), Minister of Industry (2013–2015), Minister of Canadian Heritage and Official Languages (2008–2013). Elected as a Canadian Alliance MP in 2000.
- Michelle Rempel – Shadow Minister of Immigration (2015–2019), MP for Calgary Nose Hill, Alberta (2015–present) and Calgary Centre-North, Alberta (2011–2015), Minister of Western Economic Diversification (2013–2015)
- Brad Wall – Premier of Saskatchewan (2007–2018), Leader of the Saskatchewan Party (2004–2018).
- Dianne Watts – Shadow Minister of Infrastructure & Communities (2015–2017), MP for South Surrey—White Rock, British Columbia (2015–2017), Mayor of Surrey (2004–2015) Endorsed O'Toole.

== Opinion polling ==
Some of the polls below were conducted before nominations for the leadership closed and therefore include potential candidates for the leadership race. Rona Ambrose, as interim leader, is ineligible to run for the permanent leadership unless there is a change to the party's constitution.

=== Conservative Party members ===
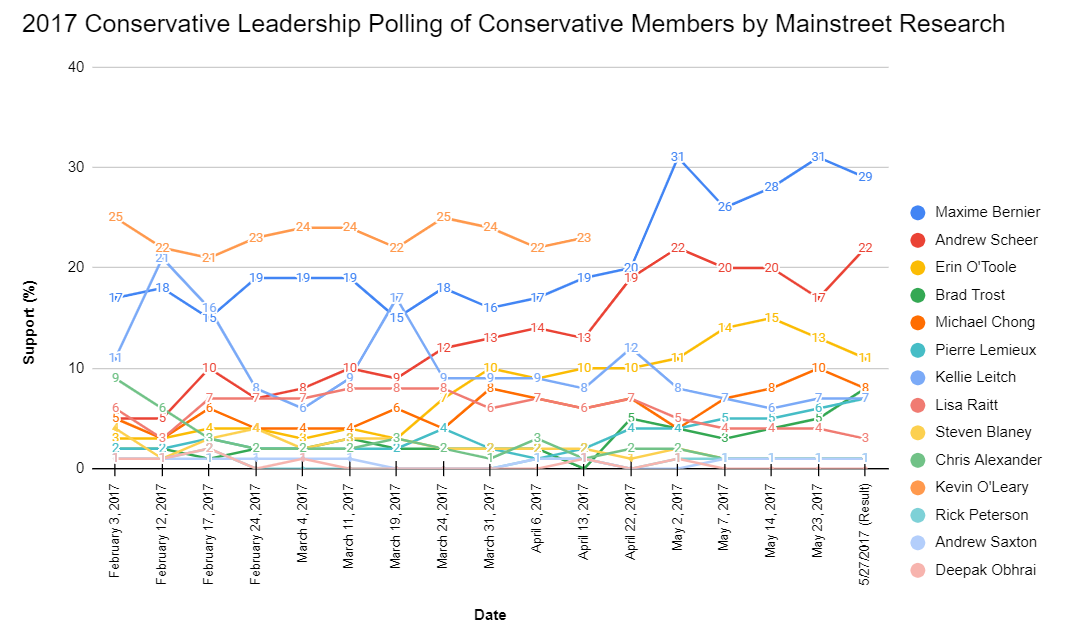
Conservative Leadership Polling of Conservative Members by Mainstreet Research.

Polling firm/Link	Last date of polling	Sample size	Margin of error	Chris Alexander	Maxime Bernier	Steven Blaney	Michael Chong	Kellie Leitch	Pierre Lemieux	Kevin O'Leary	Erin O'Toole	Lisa Raitt	Andrew Scheer	Brad Trost	Other/ Undecided
Actual results	May 27, 2017		N/A	1.12%	28.89% (49.05%)	1.26%	7.55%	7.00%	7.38%	1.07%	10.65%	3.34%	21.82% (50.95%)	8.35%	Rick Peterson 0.65% Andrew Saxton 0.50% Deepak Obhrai 0.41%
Mainstreet Research/Ipolitics	May 23, 2017	12,840	±0.84%	0.70%	31.30%	0.70%	9.50%	6.80%	6.00%	—	12.90%	3.50%	17.20%	5.10%	Undecided 4.80% Rick Peterson 0.70% Andrew Saxton 0.60% Deepak Obhrai 0.30%
Mainstreet Research/Ipolitics	May 14, 2017	9,111	±1.01%	1.14%	28.41%	1.10%	7.73%	6.22%	5.00%	—	15.20%	4.31%	19.54%	3.74%	Undecided 5.96% Rick Peterson 0.72% Andrew Saxton 0.59% Deepak Obhrai 0.33%
Mainstreet Research/Ipolitics	May 7, 2017	12,170	±0.87%	0.88%	26.26%	1.09%	7.30%	6.55%	5.45%	—	13.55%	4.15%	20.11%	3.26%	Undecided 9.18% Rick Peterson 1.10% Andrew Saxton 0.80% Deepak Obhrai 0.33%
Mainstreet Research/Ipolitics	May 2, 2017	1009	±3.09%	1.89%	31.18%	1.89%	4.18%	8.17%	4.18%	—	11.25%	5.48%	22.01%	3.59%	Undecided 4.48% Rick Peterson 0.8% Andrew Saxton 0.4% Deepak Obhrai 0.5%
Mainstreet Research/Ipolitics	April 22, 2017	2135	±2.1%	2.11%	19.63%	1.31%	7.08%	11.76%	4.36%	—	10.26%	7.31%	18.83%	4.73%	Undecided 10.96% Rick Peterson >0.47% Andrew Saxton >0.23% Deepak Obhrai >0.47%
Mainstreet Research/Ipolitics	April 22, 2017	2135	±2.1%	1.36%	14.19%	0.89%	5.53%	6.60%	4.17%	26.32%	7.82%	4.87%	16.72%	4.73%	Undecided 5.62% Rick Peterson 0.47% Andrew Saxton 0.23% Deepak Obhrai 0.47%
Mainstreet Research/Ipolitics	April 13, 2017	1740	±2.35%	1.32%	19.02%	2.30%	5.98%	7.70%	2.07%	23.16%	10.46%	6.38%	13.10%	0.11%	Undecided 5.17% Rick Peterson 1.03% Andrew Saxton 0.69% Deepak Obhrai 1.49%
Mainstreet Research/Ipolitics	April 6, 2017	1864	±2.25%	2.52%	16.84%	2.41%	6.76%	9.28%	1.18%	22.14%	9.22%	6.92%	13.73%	1.55%	Undecided 6.17% Rick Peterson 0.11% Andrew Saxton 0.97% Deepak Obhrai 0.21%
Mainstreet Research/Ipolitics	March 31, 2017	1776	±2.32%	1.41%	16.44%	2.42%	7.55%	8.90%	2.42%	23.59%	9.91%	6.31%	13.12%	1.91%	Undecided 5.74% Rick Peterson 0% Andrew Saxton 0.23% Deepak Obhrai 0.06%
Mainstreet Research/Ipolitics	March 24, 2017	1670	±2.38%	1.92%	17.66%	2.16%	4.07%	8.68%	3.53%	24.85%	6.53%	7.66%	12.34%	2.46%	Undecided 7.25% Rick Peterson 0.42% Andrew Saxton 0.36% Deepak Obhrai 0.12%
Mainstreet Research/Ipolitics	March 19, 2017	1105	±2.8%	3.05%	14.73%	2.70%	5.48%	16.89%	1.53%	22.10%	2.88%	7.82%	9.16%	1.62%	Undecided 11.05% Deepak Obhrai 0.45% Rick Peterson 0.36% Andrew Saxton 0.18%
Mainstreet Research/Ipolitics	March 11, 2017	1607	±2.26%	1.97%	19.29%	2.55%	3.73%	8.53%	2.18%	23.65%	4.23%	7.78%	10.33%	3.24%	Undecided 11.45% Andrew Saxton 0.68% Deepak Obhrai 0.25% Rick Peterson 0.19%
Mainstreet Research/Ipolitics	March 4, 2017	839	±3.37%	2.15%	19.07%	2.38%	3.81%	6.32%	2.26%	23.96%	2.62%	7.15%	7.87%	2.15%	Undecided 18.12% Andrew Saxton 1.07% Deepak Obhrai 0.60% Rick Peterson 0.48%
Mainstreet Research/Ipolitics	February 24, 2017	1,457	±2.55%	1.99%	18.91%	3.51%	3.71%	7.50%	1.93%	22.49%	4.47%	7.29%	7.36%	1.79%	Undecided 17.95% Andrew Saxton 0.55% Rick Peterson 0.34% Deepak Obhrai 0.21%
Mainstreet Research/Ipolitics	February 17, 2017	1,894	± 2.24%	2.8%	15.3%	3.3%	5.7%	16.2%	3.1%	20.9%	4.1%	6.5%	9.9%	1.1%	Undecided 7.0% Deepak Obhrai 1.8% Rick Peterson 1.6% Andrew Saxton 0.8%
Mainstreet Research/Ipolitics	February 12, 2017	804	± 3.5%	6.09%	17.54%	1.24%	2.86%	20.90%	2.36%	22.01%	3.36%	3.48%	4.60%	1.74%	Undecided 11.82% Andrew Saxton 0.75% Deepak Obhrai 0.62% Rick Peterson 0.62%
Mainstreet Research/Ipolitics	February 3, 2017	5,487	± 1.3%	8.9%	16.55%	3.95%	4.55%	10.83%	2.24%	24.75%	3.06%	6.35%	4.57%	1.89%	Undecided 10.63% Andrew Saxton 0.62% Deepak Obhrai 0.55% Rick Peterson 0.55%
Forum Research	January 21, 2017	111	± 3.0%	4%	10%	2%	5%	7%	—	31%	—	14%	8%	—	Someone else 18%
Forum Research	December 7, 2016	65	± 3.0%	9%	2%	4%	10%	8%	—	—	—	12%	2%	5%	Someone else 48%
Forum Research	May 11, 2016	118	± 3.0%	—	—	11%	—	4%	—	23%	—	2%	—	—	Someone else 23% Peter MacKay 16% Rona Ambrose 12% Jason Kenney 9%
Forum Research	April 5, 2016	112	± 3.0%	—	—	9%	—	1%	—	28%	—	2%	—	—	Someone else 24% Peter MacKay 20% Rona Ambrose 9% Jason Kenney 7%

=== Conservative Party supporters ===
Polling firm/Link	Last date of polling	Sample size	Margin of error	Chris Alexander	Maxime Bernier	Steven Blaney	Michael Chong	Kellie Leitch	Pierre Lemieux	Kevin O'Leary	Erin O'Toole	Lisa Raitt	Andrew Scheer	Brad Trost	Other/ Undecided
Probit Inc.	May 11, 2017	2,042	± 2.17%	1%	45%	2%	6%	11%	2%	1% (Write-in)	8%	9%	11%	1%	Rona Ambrose (write-in) 1% Rick Peterson 1% Other 1%
Ipsos/Global News	January 25, 2017	190	± 3.5%	1%	7%	1%	1%	7%	1%	60%	3%	5%	3%	3%	Andrew Saxton 5% Deepak Obhrai 1% Rick Peterson 1%
Forum Research	January 21, 2017	434	± 3.0%	1%	8%	3%	2%	3%	—	50%	—	7%	5%	—	Someone else 21%
Forum Research	December 7, 2016	415	± 3.0%	8%	4%	9%	8%	6%	—	—	—	8%	5%	2%	Someone else 49%
Mainstreet Research	November 6, 2016	1,478	± 2.55%	2%	11%	1%	12%	19%	—	—	11%	4%	14%	3%	Undecided 18% Deepak Obhrai 3% Dan Lindsay 0% Andrew Saxton 0%
Forum Research	October 12, 2016	355	± 3.0%	3%	17%	—	6%	6%	—	—	2%	—	6%	4%	Someone else 41% Tony Clement 14%
Mainstreet Research	September 8, 2016	1,564	± 2.48%	—	6%	—	7%	15%	—	—	9%	3%	9%	—	Peter MacKay 19% Undecided 12% Tony Clement 12% Someone else 7% Deepak Obhrai 1%
Forum Research	August 6, 2016	1,345	± 4.9%	—	10%	—	5%	4%	—	—	—	—	—	—	Tony Clement 18% Deepak Obhrai 3%
Probit Inc.	June 9, 2016	2,212	± 2.08%	—	11%	—	3%	1%	—	21%	—	5%	—	—	Peter MacKay 27% Jason Kenney 17% Rona Ambrose (write-in) 4% Tony Clement 3% Doug Ford 3% Michelle Rempel 3% Other 3%
Forum Research	May 11, 2016	420	± 3.0%	—	6%	—	—	3%	—	27%	—	2%	—	—	Peter MacKay 23% Someone else 17% Rona Ambrose 16% Jason Kenney 6%
Mainstreet Research	April 27, 2016	1,676	± 2.4%	—	6%	—	3%	2%	—	20%	—	1%	—	—	Rona Ambrose 26% Peter MacKay 16% Undecided 10% Tony Clement 7% Jason Kenney 6% Someone else 3%
Mainstreet Research	April 27, 2016	1,676	± 2.4%	—	8%	—	5%	4%	—	22%	—	3%	—	—	Peter MacKay 23% Undecided 16% Tony Clement 8% Jason Kenney 7% Someone else 4%
EKOS	April 15, 2016	1,176	± 2.9%	—	4%	—	—	2%	—	17%	—	5%	—	—	Stephen Harper 28% Peter MacKay 23% Someone else 17% Don't know 5%
Forum Research	April 5, 2016	1,455	± 3.0%	—	5%	—	—	1%	—	24%	—	4%	—	—	Peter MacKay 22% Someone else 19% Rona Ambrose 17% Jason Kenney 8%
Abacus Data	March 18 2016	1,500	± 2.6%	—	5%	—	5%	1%	—	27%	—	8%	—	—	Peter MacKay 36% Jason Kenney 12% Tony Clement 6%
Mainstreet Research	January 15, 2016	4,937	± 1.4%	—	4%	—	—	3%	—	23%	—	4%	—	—	Undecided 29% Peter MacKay 22% Jason Kenney 8% Someone else 3%
Abacus Data	January 12, 2016	1,500	± 2.6%	—	5%	—	—	4%	—	—	—	13%	—	—	Peter MacKay 42% Jason Kenney 19% Tony Clement 13% Bernard Lord 5%
Abacus Data	November 25, 2015	360	± 2.6%	—	6%	—	3%	3%	—	—	—	8%	—	—	Peter MacKay 35% Brad Wall 17% Jason Kenney 12% Jean Charest 11% Doug Ford 4%
Forum Research	November 7, 2015	334	± 3.0%	—	—	—	—	4%	—	—	—	—	—	—	Peter MacKay 32% John Baird 18% Jason Kenney 16% Rona Ambrose 12% Michelle Rempel 7% Tony Clement 7% Rob Nicholson 4%

=== All Canadians ===
Polling firm/Link	Last date of polling	Sample size	Margin of error	Chris Alexander	Maxime Bernier	Steven Blaney	Michael Chong	Kellie Leitch	Pierre Lemieux	Kevin O'Leary	Erin O'Toole	Lisa Raitt	Andrew Scheer	Brad Trost	Other/ Undecided
Nanos research	February 9, 2017	1,000	± 3.1%	<1%	8.5%	2%	9.2%	2%	—	15%	2%	7.1%	2%	<1%	Someone else 34%
Ipsos	January 25, 2017	1,000	± 3.5%	2%	8%	3%	2%	2%	1%	24%	2%	5%	1%	1%	Andrew Saxton 3% Deepak Obhrai 2% Rick Peterson 1%
Forum Research	January 21, 2017	1,332	± 3.0%	3%	11%	3%	6%	2%	—	27%	—	7%	4%	—	Someone else 38%
Forum Research	December 7, 2016	1,304	± 3.0%	6%	5%	5%	10%	7%	—	—	—	8%	3%	2%	Someone else 53%
Forum Research	October 12, 2016	1,143	± 3.0%	3%	14%	—	7%	4%	—	—	3%	—	5%	2%	Someone else 54% Tony Clement 9%
Ipsos	September 8, 2016	1,000	± 3.5%	—	15%	—	5%	2%	—	25%	2%	7%	—	—	Peter MacKay 26% Candice Bergen 10% Tony Clement 8%
Forum Research	May 11, 2016	1,517	± 3.0%	—	9%	—	—	3%	—	14%	—	4%	—	—	Someone else 35% Peter MacKay 18% Rona Ambrose 11% Jason Kenney 6%
EKOS	April 15, 2016	1,176	± 2.9%	—	6%	—	—	3%	—	9%	—	4%	—	—	Someone else 36% Peter MacKay 20% Don't know 13% Stephen Harper 11%
Forum Research	April 5, 2016	1,455	± 3.0%	—	9%	—	—	2%	—	14%	—	6%	—	—	Someone else 35% Peter MacKay 18% Rona Ambrose 10% Jason Kenney 6%
Abacus Data	March 18, 2016	1,500	± 2.6%	—	10%	—	6%	3%	—	18%	—	12%	—	—	Peter MacKay 33% Tony Clement 9% Jason Kenney 8%
Abacus Data	November 25, 2015	360	± 2.6%	—	8%	—	7%	4%	—	—	—	10%	—	—	Peter MacKay 31% Jean Charest 15% Jason Kenney 10% Brad Wall 9% Doug Ford 8%
Forum Research	November 7, 2015	334	± 3.0%	—	—	—	—	9%	—	—	—	—	—	—	Peter MacKay 29% Rona Ambrose 14% John Baird 14% Jason Kenney 11% Michelle Rempel 11% Tony Clement 7% Rob Nicholson 6%

== See also ==
- 2017 United Conservative Party leadership election
- 2017 New Democratic Party leadership election
