= Helena Guergis =

Canadian politician, businessperson

The Honourable Helena Guergis PC

Member of Parliament for Simcoe—Grey
- In office June 28, 2004 – May 2, 2011
- Preceded by: Paul Bonwick
- Succeeded by: Kellie Leitch

Personal details
- Born: February 19, 1969 (age 57) Barrie, Ontario
- Party: Independent Conservative (2010–present)
- Other political affiliations: Conservative (2004–2010)
- Spouse: Rahim Jaffer
- Children: 1
- Profession: Businesswoman, policy adviser, political assistant, public servant
- Portfolio: Secretary of State (Foreign Affairs and International Trade) 2007–2008; Secretary of State (Sport) 2007–2008; Minister of State (Status of Women) 2008–2010

Helena C. Guergis, PC (/ˈdʒɔːrdʒɪs/ JOR-jiss; born February 19, 1969) is a Canadian politician. She represented the Ontario riding of Simcoe—Grey in the House of Commons of Canada from 2004 to 2011, and was appointed Minister of State (Status of Women) on October 30, 2008, following the October 14, 2008 Canadian federal election. Soon after starting her parliamentary career, she became involved in several controversial situations, and these increased with time in both number and severity.

Guergis was forced to resign from the Cabinet of Canada and leave the Conservative Party caucus on April 9, 2010, pending a Royal Canadian Mounted Police investigation into "serious" but unspecified allegations regarding her conduct. While the RCMP investigated, and eventually concluded there was no evidence of criminal wrongdoing, Guergis continued to sit as an Independent Conservative in the House of Commons. She applied unsuccessfully for reinstatement to the Tory caucus. Guergis was defeated while running as an independent in the 2011 election by Kellie Leitch, her replacement as the riding's Conservative candidate.

On December 22, 2011, Guergis launched a defamation lawsuit against Prime Minister Stephen Harper and several other people and organizations, including the federal Conservative Party, filed in Ontario Superior Court, over accusations of unfair and malicious treatment causing damage to her political career and reputation. Her lawsuit was later dismissed.

== Early life ==
Guergis was born in Barrie, Ontario, of Assyrian descent, and raised in nearby Angus, part of Essa Township, where her family has a history of political work. Her cousins David and Tony Guergis were the mayors of Essa and Springwater, her sister Christine Brayford was a municipal councillor in New Tecumseth, their uncle Edward was a municipal councillor in Essa from 1978 to 1985, and their grandfather George was a reeve of Essa from 1971 to 1974. Both David and Tony Guergis lost in landslide defeats in their bids for re-election in 2010.

Guergis attended Georgian College in Barrie, where she completed an Ontario Real Estate program. After her graduation, she opened a bed-and-bath gift shop called "Final Touch" at the Rainbow Mall in Angus. She also worked as a fundraising volunteer for the Angus Food Bank and the Barrie Literacy Council, and was a Crisis Intervention volunteer for the Barrie and District Rape Crisis Centre for seven years. Guergis was a constituency assistant and executive assistant to Progressive Conservative Member of Provincial Parliament (MPP) Joe Tascona during this period.

== Provincial politics ==
Guergis closed her consumer retail business after six-and-a-half years, to accept a political adviser's position with Janet Ecker, who was then Minister of Education and Finance in the Ontario Progressive Conservative government of Premier Mike Harris. She held this position for three-and-a-half years, and also served three terms as a vice-president on the Progressive Conservative Party's provincial executive.

She was the Progressive Conservative candidate for the downtown Toronto riding of Trinity—Spadina in the 2003 provincial election. The PCs did not target this riding as winnable, and Guergis agreed to be a "sacrificial lamb" candidate in order to gain experience. She finished a distant third against New Democratic Party incumbent Rosario Marchese. In 2004, Guergis endorsed Frank Klees for the leadership of the Ontario Progressive Conservative Party.

== Member of Parliament ==
Guergis defeated Liberal incumbent Paul Bonwick by 100 votes in the 2004 election to win the riding of Simcoe-Grey. The Liberals formed a minority government after the election, and Guergis was appointed to the Conservative shadow cabinet as critic for International Co-operation. On January 24, 2005, she was appointed deputy critic for seniors' issues.

=== Stances on same-sex marriage issue ===
When running for provincial office in 2003 in the socially liberal riding of Trinity-Spadina, Guergis said that she would vote in favour of same-sex marriage if given the opportunity. Responding to a question on same-sex marriage at an all-candidates debate, she said, "I believe in the right to choose, so I would be voting in favour of it."

Campaigning the following year in the socially conservative riding of Simcoe-Grey, Guergis said that she would vote against the federal government's proposed legalization of same-sex marriage. She argued that the majority of her constituents opposed the initiative, and that she was committed to supporting their views. Guergis did in fact vote against Bill C-38, which granted legal sanction to same-sex marriage, in 2005. In the same year, she tabled a private member's bill restricting MPs from crossing parties after their election.

=== Wins re-election, becomes parliamentary secretary ===
Guergis was re-elected with 49.8 per cent of the vote in the 2006 election, substantially increasing her margin of victory as the Conservatives won a minority government nationally. On February 7, 2006, she was named by Prime Minister Stephen Harper as parliamentary secretary to David Emerson, the Minister of International Trade, and the Minister for the Pacific Gateway and the Vancouver-Whistler Olympics. Guergis's appointment was somewhat controversial, in that Emerson had crossed the floor from the Liberal Party of Canada on the same day that he received his cabinet position. One day prior to her appointment, Guergis informed the media that she would issue a press release indicating her continued support for anti-floor-crossing legislation. The release never appeared.

== Cabinet Minister ==
On January 4, 2007, Guergis joined the federal Cabinet when she was promoted to the dual positions of Secretary of State for Foreign Affairs and International Trade, and Secretary of State for Sport. In February, she rejected opposition calls for a travel advisory for Mexico. Opposition members had made this request, after four Canadian tourists were killed in Mexico over the course of a year.

On February 19, 2007, Guergis and Health Minister Tony Clement announced that Canada was reviving its dormant ParticipACTION program to encourage personal fitness.

=== Afghan detainee controversy, injudicious information release ===
The Conservative government was criticized in April and May 2007, over its handling of reports on the alleged mistreatment of prisoners captured by Canadian soldiers and turned over to local authorities in Afghanistan. At one stage, Guergis stated in response to an opposition question in Parliament that "The NATO commander has confirmed and has said that he sees no evidence to back up any allegations that are being made by the Taliban alleged terrorist detainees. The hon[orable] member continues to take the word of the Taliban detainees over our brave Canadian men and women and that is truly unfortunate." The matter expanded into a full-blown controversy several months later, when it became clear that evidence of Afghan detainee mistreatment had been covered up, and it has retained Parliament's interest to the present day.

In January 2008, Guergis revealed that opposition leader Stéphane Dion would be traveling to Kandahar, Afghanistan, to visit a reconstruction project. This visit, along with similar visits to sensitive war-torn regions by Canadian politicians of all parties, along with other notable Canadians, was supposed to have been kept secret for Dion's protection. After his return to Canada, Dion angrily criticized Guergis' action, saying that she put him at risk of possibly being attacked by the Taliban. In a letter to Harper, Dion demanded Guergis' resignation or firing, saying that Guergis committed a "gross breach of Canadian security" that raised doubts about her fitness for Cabinet.

She was re-elected in the 2008 federal election, winning 55 per cent of the popular vote, following which she was appointed Minister of State (Status of Women).

=== Remarriage ===
On October 15, 2008, Guergis married her former caucus colleague Rahim Jaffer; this was her second marriage and his first. Jaffer and Guergis became engaged in October 2007, and decided on the morning after the election to scrap their planned wedding date and to get married immediately. Jaffer, who had served as an MP since 1997 at the age of 25, lost his own Alberta seat, Edmonton—Strathcona, in the election. Their wedding was presided over by Ian McClelland, a former Member of Parliament and a licensed marriage commissioner, later that same day at McClelland's home. The couple's parliamentary colleague James Rajotte, along with one of Jaffer's cousins, witnessed the ceremony.

On June 16, 2010, Jaffer excused his absence from a parliamentary committee hearing, which was being convened to look into allegations of his misconduct, by disclosing that Guergis was pregnant.

== Controversies ==
=== Charlottetown Airport incident ===
On February 19, 2010, Guergis was alleged to have had a verbal confrontation with Air Canada and Charlottetown Airport security staff while attempting to board an Air Canada Jazz flight to Montreal. According to an anonymous letter allegedly from an airport employee, Guergis arrived with an aide very late for her flight to Montreal, and publicly berated airport staff and security. During pre-boarding airport screening, Guergis reportedly refused to remove her footwear, which set off the alarm as she walked through the metal detector. When Guergis was asked again to take off her footwear, she was allegedly rude and uncooperative. On February 25, 2010, Guergis issued an apology for the airport incident by news release. During the week of March 15, 2010, Guergis claimed that she had grounds for legal action against Air Canada, for violation of her privacy. Guergis was criticized by members of the Federal Conservative Party, who felt her actions hurt the party.

CBC's TV news anchor Peter Mansbridge went to an airport security headquarters office in Ottawa with Guergis to view the tapes of the alleged incident. Mansbridge described it as "pretty tame stuff." "At no time does she throw her boots. Nor does she wave her arms around, he said." "I can tell you I have seen a lot worse on most of my trips through Canadian airports of people being upset about what they were being put through," Mansbridge said."

=== Letters to the editor controversy ===
Several people—including Guergis’ executive assistant Jessica Craven, Craven's mother Dawn Richards, constituency office staff member Valerie Knight, former Simcoe—Grey riding association president Paul Shaw, and Bonnie Ainsworth, an assistant to Guergis’ colleague MP Patrick Brown – allegedly engaged in a coordinated letter-writing campaign to the local media in Guergis' riding, praising the abilities and achievements of Guergis. None of the individuals disclosed their close association with the Conservative Minister. Guergis subsequently blamed Craven, declaring it was not appropriate for her to send letters to media without disclosing her identity.

=== Conduct involving Jaffer; RCMP investigates ===
According to CTV News, the Royal Canadian Mounted Police investigated allegations that Guergis allowed Jaffer to conduct commercial business out of her office unrelated to her parliamentary work, after Jaffer had lost his own position as an MP, and also sometimes accompanied Jaffer to his business meetings during this period. On April 13, 2010, Guergis' former chauffeur told The Globe and Mail that Guergis frequently let Jaffer use her government-issued car for personal use when she was not using it. The Toronto Star reported that Jaffer, then still an MP, accompanied Guergis on an official trip to Belize, according to pictures posted on a Canadian government website; this was some three months before their October 2008 marriage.

The Globe and Mail reported that Guergis and Jaffer had dinner in September 2009 with Nazim Gillani, a Toronto financier. A few days earlier, Gillani and Jaffer had gone to dinner together—but without Guergis—and Gillani subsequently wrote an "over-enthusiastic" email saying that Jaffer had "opened the Prime Minister's Office to us," for which Gillani has apologized, saying Jaffer never used those words. Gillani had apparently claimed he was a banker for the Hells Angels motorcycle gang, and was under police investigation at the time for suspected underworld connections. Later that night, Jaffer was picked up for speeding by the Ontario Provincial Police near his wife's riding, arrested, and charged with impaired driving and cocaine possession; he subsequently pleaded guilty to careless driving and had his licence suspended. The cocaine possession and impaired driving charges were later dropped.

CTV News reported that Prime Minister Harper forced Guergis to resign from Cabinet and suspended her from caucus, after private investigator Derek Snowdy, who was investigating Gillani on an unrelated matter, claimed that Gillani had made some verbal accusations about Guergis and Jaffer. Guergis denied the allegations against her; her lawyer stated that she "vigorously denies all of this man's bizarre claims, and looks forward to helping the RCMP demonstrate that they are completely false". Gillani also denied Snowdy's claim in testimony before the Commons committee investigating the issue, while the Globe and Mail reported that Snowdy had filed for bankruptcy in 2009 to cover over $13 million of debt, including $2 million of taxes owed.

== Resignation from party ==
On April 9, 2010, Guergis resigned her post as Minister of State for Status of Women, and she was expelled from the Conservative caucus. In announcing the resignation and expulsion, PM Harper also said that he had asked both the Royal Canadian Mounted Police (RCMP) and the Commons ethics commissioner Mary Dawson to investigate allegations about Guergis. Harper stated that pending the results of the investigation, Guergis would leave the Conservative caucus and sit as an independent.

Guergis maintained at the time that she had no knowledge of what she was being accused of. Opposition MPs pressed the government for more details about the allegations, citing Harper's previous willingness to defend her. At Question Period on April 12, 2010, Michael Ignatieff, leader of the Official Opposition Liberals, wondered how soon the government would "tell Canadians the truth." His sentiments were echoed by NDP leader Jack Layton, who called for Harper to "come clean" about why Harper went so far as to call in the RCMP, because he was ultimately responsible for his ministers. Transport Minister John Baird, speaking for the government, was reticent with further details, saying only that Harper "acted quickly and appropriately" after being tipped off by an unknown "third party." Ignatieff has also linked the events to organized crime, due to the reports of cocaine being present: "I don’t want to make false accusations but you don’t get cocaine at a corner drug store, right? You have to get it from somewhere, from someone and usually that means organized crime".

Some people have expressed concern that Guergis's right to due process (innocent until proven guilty) has been infringed upon. On The Michael Coren Show, commentator Akaash Maharaj, former Liberal and Independent MP John Nunziata, and host Coren himself voiced opposition to the way Guergis was being treated. "Whatever happened to due process in this country?" Nunziata said. On May 16, 2010 Alfred Apps, Canada's Liberal party president, said Guergis was treated unfairly by PM Stephen Harper. "This whole Guergis situation is what I hope will become a big wakeup call to Canadians," Apps said. "We treat our public servants … with just horrific disrespect these days and then we go on and treat our members (of Parliament), we don't give them the natural justice that we would expect to give to ordinary Canadians." Apps continued, "He's (Stephen Harper) basically taken onto himself, on the basis of serious and credible allegations – and there's no evidence yet that they were either serious or credible." Further, Apps said, "She has the right to know specifically the allegations against her; she has the right to be heard and answer to those allegations." However, Conservative MP Shelly Glover said Harper did the right thing in expelling Guergis. According to Glover: "These were serious allegations that were brought forward to the prime minister, and frankly he did the right thing. He is the prime minister of the country and we need to maintain confidence in all the people working for him."

=== No evidence found of criminal wrongdoing ===
When Derek Snowdy, the Toronto-based private investigator involved in the Guergis-Jaffer political affair, testified before the House of Commons Government Operations Committee in Ottawa in May 2010, he said he had no incriminating evidence regarding Guergis. "I have nothing – I have no evidence, or no information, with respect to conduct of Ms. Guergis in my possession or knowledge," he said.

The RCMP would echo Snowdy on July 21, 2010, in saying there was no evidence to indicate criminal actions by Guergis. It was also announced that they were ceasing their investigations of Rahim Jaffer. Guergis's lawyer, Howard Rubel, also stated that Guergis was not interviewed nor asked any questions, and "that speaks volumes."

=== Conservatives drop Guergis as candidate ===
On May 5, 2010, the Conservative Party's National Council removed Guergis as their nominated candidate for Simcoe—Grey. Earlier in the week local Conservatives in the riding wrote a letter to Prime Minister Stephen Harper asking that he not interfere with the local Conservative riding association's process of choosing a candidate. Executives of the association stated "head office personnel have deliberately interfered with, obstructed and circumvented our autonomy as an association, and our right to freely express our opinions" if Harper had taken action to remove Guergis. On September 14, 2010, the Toronto Star reported Dr. Kellie Leitch planned to run for the Conservative nomination in Simcoe-Grey. Leitch subsequently won the nomination.

Guergis was involved in an automobile accident in August 2010, but emerged uninjured. Guergis sought to rejoin the Conservative caucus after being cleared by the RCMP, but was rejected. She stated she would run as an independent candidate in the next federal election. Her independent candidacy led to a third-place finish in the May 2011 election, when she gained only 13.5 per cent of the vote.

=== Ethics Commissioner finds against Guergis ===
On May 20, 2010, Federal Ethics Commissioner Mary Dawson fined Guergis $100 for failing to report details of an $800,000 mortgage liability within the 30-day time limit required for MPs. Guergis had purchased an Ottawa home with her husband Rahim Jaffer in November 2009. Guergis said "I simply forgot and I accept responsibility for this oversight, I have already made arrangements to pay the fine – within the 30 days I was provided to do so."

In July 2011, Mary Dawson further found Guergis contravened two sections of the MP Conflict of Interest code, by writing a letter of support for a company in the Green Energy sector to a local municipal politician. Guergis's husband Rahim Jaffer was seeking lobbying business from the same company at the time; further issues with Jaffer on this file concerned his not being properly registered as a lobbyist under applicable federal rules, and his employment as a lobbyist too soon after having been an MP.

== Lawsuit ==
On December 22, 2011, Guergis launched a defamation lawsuit against Prime Minister Harper, as well as against several other people and organizations, including the federal Tory party, in Ontario Superior Court, over allegations of unfair treatment leading to damage to her reputation and political career. The lawsuit was dismissed from Ontario Superior Court, by Justice Charles Hackland in late August, 2012. Guergis immediately announced her intention to appeal this decision. Her appeal was rejected by the Court of Appeal for Ontario in June, 2013.

In the summer of 2013, Guergis filed an amended statement of claim against Snowdy, Glover, the lawyer who had represented Harper in the original lawsuit, and his lawfirm. A lawyer representing Glover and Harper argued that the case should be placed on hold until Guergis had paid the legal costs that had been awarded in the earlier suit, but the judge rejected this argument and ordered that the suit could proceed.

== Aftermath ==
Guergis announced in the spring of 2012 that she had moved to Edmonton, Alberta and that she had been accepted to study law at the University of Alberta. She began her law studies in September 2012. She graduated with her Juris Doctor degree in November 2017.

Helena Guergis is currently a practicing lawyer since 2023 at Craig Paterson Law, Alberta.

== Posts in the Harper government ==
28th Canadian Ministry (2006–2015) – Cabinet of Stephen Harper
Cabinet post (1)
Predecessor	Office	Successor
Josée Verner (*)	Minister responsible for the Status of Women; 2008–2010	Rona Ambrose
Sub-Cabinet Posts (2)
Predecessor	Title	Successor
position created in 2007	Secretary of State for Foreign Affairs and International Trade (2007–2008)	position abolished in 2008
Peter Van Loan (*)	Secretary of State (Sport) (2007–2008)	Gary Lunn

- Verner's full official title was Minister of Canadian Heritage and Status of Women and Minister for la Francophonie.
- Van Loan's official title was Minister for Sport.

== Electoral record ==
2011 Canadian federal election: Simcoe—Grey
Party	Candidate	Votes	%	±%	Expenditures
Conservative	Kellie Leitch	31,784	49.36	-5.68	$96,128.50
New Democratic	Katy Austin	11,185	17.38	+6.18	7,993.48
Independent	Helena Guergis	8,714	13.50	–	57,289.66
Liberal	Alex Smardenka	8,207	12.75	-8.80	83,148.92
Green	Jace Metheral	3,482	5.41	-4.71	8,522.13
Christian Heritage	Peter Vander Zaag	757	1.18	–	4,385.89
Canadian Action	Gord Cochrane	244	0.38	–	2,512.75
Total valid votes/Expense limit		64,373	100.00	–	$99,651.72
Total rejected ballots		269	0.42	+0.08	
Turnout		64,642	66.13	+6.03	
Eligible voters		97,755	–	–	
Conservative hold		Swing		-5.93	

Source: Elections Canada

2008 Canadian federal election: Simcoe—Grey
Party	Candidate	Votes	%	±%	Expenditures
Conservative	Helena Guergis	30,897	55.0%	+5.2%	$71,239
Liberal	Andrea Matrosovs	12,099	21.6%	-9.3%	$36,810
New Democratic	Katy Austin	6,288	11.2%	0.0%	$6,077
Green	Peter Ellis	5,685	10.1%	+4.5%	$9,015
Christian Heritage	Peter Vander Zaag	1,018	1.8%	-0.6%	$4,175
Libertarian	Caley McKibbin	143	0.3%	–	$20
Total valid votes/expense limit		56,130	100.0%	–	$94,127
Total rejected ballots		189			
Turnout		56,319			

2006 Canadian federal election: Simcoe—Grey
Party	Candidate	Votes	%	Expenditures
Conservative	Helena Guergis	30,135	49.76	$84,181.76
Liberal	Elizabeth Kirley	18,689	30.86	$92,500.47
New Democratic	Katy Austin	6,784	11.20	$10,776.74
Green	Peter Ellis	3,372	5.57	$2,361.42
Christian Heritage	Peter Vander Zaag	1,585	2.62	$14,301.65
Total valid votes		60,565	100.00	
Total rejected ballots		172		
Turnout		60,737	67.60	
Electors on the lists		89,841		
Sources: Official Results, Elections Canada and Financial Returns, Elections Canada.

2004 Canadian federal election: Simcoe—Grey
Party	Candidate	Votes	%	Expenditures
Conservative	Helena Guergis	22,496	40.62	$81,760.75
Liberal	Paul Bonwick	22,396	40.44	$75,249.79
New Democratic	Colin Mackinnon	5,532	9.99	$6,796.70
Green	Peter Ellis	2,668	4.82	$654.47
Christian Heritage	Peter Vander Zaag	2,285	4.13	$10,167.48
Total valid votes		55,377	100.00	
Total rejected ballots		248		
Turnout		55,625	63.15	
Electors on the lists		88,083		
Percentage change figures are factored for redistribution. Conservative Party percentages are contrasted with the combined Canadian Alliance and Progressive Conservative percentages from 2000.
Sources: Official Results, Elections Canada and Financial Returns, Elections Canada.

2003 Ontario general election: Trinity—Spadina
Party	Candidate	Votes	%	Expenditures
New Democratic	Rosario Marchese	19,268	47.51	$64,058.75
Liberal	Nellie Pedro	12,927	31.88	$131,631.40
Progressive Conservative	Helena Guergis	4,985	12.29	$23,485.00
Green	Greg Laxton	2,362	5.82	$5,594.40
Libertarian	Judson Glober	756	1.86	$0.00
Independent Renewal	Nick Lin	256	0.63	$626.66
Total valid votes		40,554	100.00	
Total rejected, unmarked and declined ballots		453		
Turnout		41,007	52.05	
Electors on the lists		78,790		
