= Paul Bonwick =

Canadian lobbyist and politician

Paul Bonwick, PC (born October 24, 1964) is a lobbyist and former politician in Canada.

== Political career ==
A businessman and sales and marketing consultant, Bonwick was first elected to the House of Commons of Canada in the 1997 Canadian federal election as the Liberal Member of Parliament for Simcoe—Grey. He was re-elected in the 2000 Canadian federal election.

In December 2003, after six years as a government backbencher under Prime Minister Jean Chrétien, he was appointed parliamentary secretary to the Minister of Human Resources and Skills Development with special emphasis on Student Loans by Chrétien's successor, Paul Martin and as such was appointed to the Queen's Privy Council for Canada.

In the subsequent 2004 Canadian federal election, Bonwick, having benefited in the past by vote-splitting between the Progressive Conservatives and the Reform Party, fell victim to the new Conservative Party of Canada, losing his seat to Conservative candidate Helena Guergis by 100 votes.

== Post-Political Career ==
Since 2005, Bonwick has been registered as a legislative lobbyist for Access Copyright, a not-for-profit agency representing publishers, authors, photographers and other content creators.

== Controversies ==
An ongoing investigation into fraud and breach of trust involving the Collingwood town hall, including Bonwick's sister Mayor Sandra Cooper, has uncovered hidden payments to Bonwick and that Cooper had presided over and voted on issues in which she had a conflict of interest.

A judicial inquiry was called after the Ontario Provincial Police discovered that Bonwick and his consulting company, Compenso Communications, were hired by the former electric utility company (PowerStream) to help them secure a 50% stake in the local power utility, Collus, in 2012; while his sister was mayor of Collingwood. The public was not aware that the mayor's brother was closely connected to the multi-million dollar winning bid at the time. Matters were only made worse when it was revealed that the city had received a much higher bid for Collus from one of PowerStream's rivals. For his help in clinching the deal, Bonwick was paid $323,000 in consulting fees. Records also suggest that he working closely with the Mayor's office at the time and may have had insider information and special access to Collingwood council during the bidding. Bonwick flatly denies that he ever colluded with his sister or that he ever had access to information that wasn't accessible by other parties if they had requested it.

As of April 2019 the police investigation is ongoing but no charges have been laid.
