= Tremont House =

Tremont House may refer to:

== Canada ==
- Tremont House (Collingwood, Ontario), a historic building in the Collingwood Heritage Conservation District

== United States ==
- Tremont House (Bellevue, Ohio), on the National Register of Historic Places
- Tremont House (Boston), the first hotel with indoor plumbing
- Tremont House (Chicago), 1860 Republican National Convention Headquarters
- Tremont House (Galveston), a historic hotel in the Strand Historic District
