= 2014 Simcoe County municipal elections =

Local election in Ontario, Canada

Elections were held in Simcoe County, Ontario on October 27, 2014 in conjunction with municipal elections across the province.

== Simcoe County Council ==
The county council consists of the mayors and deputy mayors of the municipalities.

Office	Elected
Mayor of Adjala-Tosorontio	Mary Small Brett
Deputy Mayor of Adjala-Tosorontio	Doug Little
Mayor of Bradford West Gwillimbury	Rob Keffer
Deputy Mayor of Bradford West Gwillimbury	James Leduc
Mayor of Clearview	Christopher Vanderkruys
Deputy Mayor of Clearview	Barry Burton
Mayor of Collingwood	Sandra Cooper
Deputy Mayor of Collingwood	Brian Saunderson
Mayor of Essa	Terry Dowdall
Deputy Mayor of Essa	Sandie Macdonald (acclaimed)
Mayor of Innisfil	Gord Wauchope
Deputy Mayor of Innisfil	Lynn Dollin
Mayor of Midland	Gord McKay
Deputy Mayor of Midland	Mike Ross
Mayor of New Tecumseth	Rick Milne
Deputy Mayor of New Tecumseth	Jamie Smith
Mayor of Oro-Medonte	Harry Hughes (acclaimed)
Deputy Mayor of Oro-Medonte	Ralph Hough (acclaimed)
Mayor of Penetanguishene	Gerry Marshall
Deputy Mayor of Penetanguishene	Anita Dubeau
Mayor of Ramara	Basil Clarke
Deputy Mayor of Ramara	John O'Donnell
Mayor of Severn	Mike Burkett
Deputy Mayor of Severn	Judith Cox (acclaimed)
Mayor of Springwater	Bill French
Deputy Mayor of Springwater	Don Allen
Mayor of Tay	Scott Warnock (acclaimed)
Deputy Mayor of Tay	Bill Rawson (acclaimed)
Mayor of Tiny	George Cornell
Deputy Mayor of Tiny	Steffen Walma
Mayor of Wasaga Beach	Brian Smith
Deputy Mayor of Wasaga Beach	Nina Bifolchi

== Adjala-Tosorontio ==
Mayoral Candidate	Vote	%
Mary Small Brett	1,807	55.09
Leo Losereit	1,473	44.91

== Bradford West Gwillimbury ==
Mayoral Candidate	Vote	%
Rob Keffer	4,741	54.13
Doug White (X)	3,754	42.97
Herman Burgos	254	2.90

== Clearview ==
Mayoral Candidate	Vote	%
Christopher Vanderkruys	2,856	56.63
Alicia Savage	2,187	43.37

== Collingwood ==
Mayoral Candidate	Vote	%
Sandra Cooper (X)	4,636	51.28
Chris Carrier	2,273	25.14
Joe Gardhouse	2,131	23.57

== Essa ==
Mayoral Candidate	Vote	%
Terry Dowdall (X)	2,452	63.90
Archie Duckworth	1,385	36.10

== Innisfil ==
Mayoral Candidate	Vote	%
Gordon Wauchope	5,003	48.20
Barb Baguley (X)	4,175	40.23
Dean N. Bracko	894	8.61
Derek Majewski	307	2.96

== Midland ==
Mayoral Candidate	Vote	%
Gord McKay (X)	2,449	45.54
James M. Downer	1,988	36.97
Jonathan Reid	461	8.57
Stephan Kramp	448	8.33
Sid A. Hutchinson	32	0.60

== New Tecumseth ==
Mayoral Candidate	Vote	%
Rick Milne	4,152	45.67
Kevin Kemp	3,454	37.99
Bob Marrs	1,062	11.68
Damon Corbet	424	4.66

== Oro-Medonte ==
Mayoral Candidate	Vote	%
Harry Hughes (X)	Acclaimed	

== Penetanguishene ==
Mayoral Candidate	Vote	%
Gerry Marshall (X)	2,257	70.25
Michael Cadieux	956	29.75

== Ramara ==
Mayoral Candidate	Vote	%
Basil Clarke	2,157	41.95
Shannon O'Donnell	1,565	30.44
Bill Duffy (X)	1,383	26.90
Arnold Guettler	37	0.72

== Severn ==
Mayoral Candidate	Vote	%
Mike Burkett (X)	3,051	84.38
Philip S. Sled	565	15.63

== Springwater ==
Mayoral Candidate	Vote	%
Bill French	3,426	52.91
Linda Collins (X)	2,468	38.12
Tony Guergis	581	8.97

== Tay ==
Mayoral Candidate	Vote	%
Scott Warnock (X)	Acclaimed	

== Tiny ==
Mayoral Candidate	Vote	%
George Cornell	3,439	48.73
George Lawrence	2,345	33.23
Anthony Lancia	1,065	15.09
Peter E. Davenport	208	2.95

== Wasaga Beach ==
Mayoral Candidate	Vote	%
Brian Smith	5,311	56.32
David Foster	2,073	21.98
Cal Patterson (X)	2,046	21.70
