= Edna Jaques =

Canadian poet (1891–1978)

Edna Parliament Jaques (17 January 1891 – 13 September 1978) was a Canadian poet. Born in Collingwood, Ontario, and raised on a homestead in Saskatchewan, by the 1950s, she was "possibly the best-selling poet of her generation."

== Biography ==
When Jaques was born, her father was a ship's captain on the Great Lakes. In 1902, when Jaques was 11, the family moved to a homestead about 45 kilometres (28 mi) southeast of Moose Jaw. The family homestead later became the town of Briercrest, Saskatchewan: "Mrs. Jaques had chosen the name after the wild roses growing on a ridge nearby and agreed to the use of the name for the village." Peachey House in Briercrest was renamed the Brier Rose Cultural Centre in 2012 in Edna Jaques's honour.

After high school, wanting to see the world, Jaques travelled west, working as an itinerant seamstress to pay her way; in Calgary, she stopped. There, in 1918, she wrote a poetic response to John McCrae's "In Flanders' Fields", which was to become her most famous poems. Recognizing Jaques's talents, the editor of the Calgary Herald offered to pay for her to attend university. Still wanting to travel, though, Jaques convinced the editor, instead, to pay for her passage to the West Coast, where she worked as a stewardess on a coastal steamer before attending business school. After a short stint with the Vancouver Province, she returned to Saskatchewan. She married farmer William Ernest Jamieson (1889–1942) on 30 November 1921, in Moose Jaw. The couple settled on a farm near Tisdale, Saskatchewan, but four years later Jaques moved back south with their only child, a daughter, Joyce (1923–2011).

Edna and Joyce moved to Victoria, BC, where she worked as a stenographer from 1929 until 1935 as well as continuing to contribute articles and poems to newspapers and magazines. In addition to her writing, Jaques began lecturing to women's groups. Beginning in 1929 with a presentation to the Canadian Club in Moose Jaw, she subsequently toured across Canada lecturing for that organization. Her first book of poetry—Wide Horizons—was published in 1934, followed soon after by Drifting Soil (1934), inspired by the dusty bowl of the prairie provinces at the time. In 1935, with the assistance of Nellie McClung, who also lived in Victoria, Jaques published My Kitchen Window, her first real success. During the Depression, her books—sold at 25¢ each—were a necessary income. Times were hard; in 1937, she published an article in Chatelaine, describing the difficulties women in the prairies at that time faced.

In 1935, Jaques sent Joyce—now 12 years old—back to Briercrest, while she engaged more completely in her public lectures and other work for women's institutes. In 1939, she was operated on for a spinal tumour. During the Second World War, she worked for the Wartime Prices and Trade Board in Ottawa, as well as spending some time working in a factory in Toronto, where she "operated a fifteen-ton powder press." Following the war, she settled on "three acres of land" on the shores of Lake Ontario, about 30 km west of Toronto.

Interviewing Jaques in 1952, the year she was ranked "one of Canada's most popular women," journalist Janice Tyrwhitt observed that "what Robert Burns was to Scotland ... Edna Jaques is to Canada ... the voice of the people. Her poems — as she says herself — are clad in print and homespun and the rough weave of common folk." In 1976, she was proclaimed Woman of the Year by Bill Davis, premier of Ontario. She died in Toronto on 13 September 1978.

== Literary production ==
As a young girl, Jaques was "constantly jotting down rhymes on scraps of paper," which led to her being known as the "scrapbook poetess of the West" (in 1934, author and politician Nellie McClung wrote an article about her friend Edna Jaques entitled "The Scrapbook Poet"). Her first poem was published in the Moose Jaw Times in 1904, when she was 13 years old.

Jaques's poem "In Flanders Now", first published in the Calgary Herald, was later "printed on a card along with the Belgian National Anthem [and] was sold throughout the United States at 10¢ a copy and raised one million dollars for war relief." It was also recited at the dedication of the Tomb of the Unknown Soldier in Arlington National Cemetery in 1921 and a copy placed in the memorial chapel.

Jaques was a prolific poet. She wrote 10 volumes of poetry as well as considerable contributions of poetry and articles to newspapers and journals. For 30 years, the Saskatchewan Farmer magazine published a poem of hers every month, and over the space of 20 years, the Vancouver Province was publishing 10 of her poems per month. Jaques was one of "Canada’s best-selling poet[s,] with an annual sale of five thousand volumes." Her total poetic outputs is calculated at over 3000 poems, and at the time of her death, her books are said to have sold over 250,000 copies.

== Volumes of poetry ==
Jaques published the following volumes of poetry:

Wide Horizons (Moose Jaw, SK: Moose Jaw Times, 1934)

Drifting Soil (Moose Jaw, SK: Moose Jaw Times, 1934)

My Kitchen Window (Toronto: Allen, 1935)

Dreams in Your Heart (Toronto: Allen, 1937)

Beside Still Waters (Toronto: Allen, 1939)

Britons Awake (Toronto: Allen, 1940)

Aunt Hattie's Place (Toronto: Allen, 1941)

Verses for You (Moose Jaw, SK: Moose Jaw Writers’ Club, [1941])

Roses in December (Toronto: Allen, 1944)

Back-Door Neighbors (Toronto: Allen, 1946)

Hills of Home (Toronto: Allen, 1948)

Fireside Poems (Toronto: Allen, 1950)

The Golden Road (Toronto: Allen, 1953)
