= 2010 Simcoe County municipal elections =

Local election in Ontario, Canada

Elections were held in Simcoe County, Ontario on October 25, 2010, in conjunction with municipal elections across the province.

== Simcoe County Council ==
The county council consists of the mayors and deputy mayors of the municipalities.

Office	Elected
Mayor of Adjala-Tosorontio	Tom Walsh
Deputy Mayor of Adjala-Tosorontio	Mary C. Small Brett
Mayor of Bradford West Gwillimbury	Douglas Francis White
Deputy Mayor of Bradford West Gwillimbury	Rob Keffer
Mayor of Clearview	Ken Ferguson
Deputy Mayor of Clearview	Alicia Savage
Mayor of Collingwood	Sandra Cooper
Deputy Mayor of Collingwood	Rick Lloyd
Mayor of Essa	Terry Dowdall
Deputy Mayor of Essa	Sandie Macdonald
Mayor of Innisfil	Barb Baguley
Deputy Mayor of Innisfil	Dan Davidson
Mayor of Midland	Gordon A. McKay
Deputy Mayor of Midland	Stephan M. Kramp
Mayor of New Tecumseth	Mike MacEachern
Deputy Mayor of New Tecumseth	Rick Milne
Mayor of Oro-Medonte	Harry Hughes
Deputy Mayor of Oro-Medonte	Ralph Hough
Mayor of Penetanguishene	Gerry Marshall
Deputy Mayor of Penetanguishene	Patrick Marion
Mayor of Ramara	Bill Duffy
Deputy Mayor of Ramara	Basil Clarke
Mayor of Severn	Mike H. Burkett
Deputy Mayor of Severn	Judith A. Cox
Mayor of Springwater	Linda Collins
Deputy Mayor of Springwater	Dan McLean
Mayor of Tay	Scott Warnock
Deputy Mayor of Tay	Bill Rawson
Mayor of Tiny	Ray Millar
Deputy Mayor of Tiny	George Lawrence
Mayor of Wasaga Beach	Cal Patterson
Deputy Mayor of Wasaga Beach	David Foster

== Adjala-Tosorontio ==
Mayoral Candidate	Vote	%
Tom Walsh (X)	1,773	
Leo Losereit	1,145	
Jack Jordan	453	

== Bradford West Gwillimbury ==
Mayoral Candidate	Vote	%
Douglas Francis White (X)	3,897	
Jim Corneau	3,247	

== Clearview ==
Mayoral Candidate	Vote	%
Ken Ferguson (X)	3,758	
Christopher Vanderkruys	1,741	

== Collingwood ==
Mayoral Candidate	Vote	%
Sandra Cooper	5,702	67.5
Mike Young	1,447	17.1
Kathy Jeffery	964	11.4
Eammon D. Paterson	225	2.7
Raymond Thomas Branget	109	1.3

== Essa ==
Mayoral Candidate	Vote	%
Terry Dowdall	3,063	67.41
David Guergis (X)	1,481	32.59

== Innisfil ==
Mayoral Candidate	Vote	%
Barb Baguley	5,943	53.1%
Gord Wauchope	5,243	46.9%

== Midland ==
Mayoral Candidate	Vote	%
Gordon A. McKay	2,562	
James M. Downer (X)	2,425	

== New Tecumseth ==
Mayoral Candidate	Vote	%
Mike MacEachern (X)	5,667	
Tom Carter	1,702	
Douglas Graystone	595	

== Oro-Medonte ==
Mayoral Candidate	Vote	%
Harry Hughes (X)	Acclaimed	

== Penetanguishene ==
Mayoral Candidate	Vote	%
Gerry Marshall	2,198	
Anita Dubeau (X)	691	
Doug Leroux	545	

== Ramara ==
Mayoral Candidate	Vote	%
Bill Duffy (X)	2,968	
Mary Bax	2,475	

== Severn ==
Mayoral Candidate	Vote	%
Mike H. Burkett	1,487	
Phil S. Sled (X)	1,068	
Frank J. Coyle	736	
Colin Bidmead	518	

== Springwater ==
Mayoral Candidate	Vote	%
Linda Collins	3,203	
Bill French	1,863	
Tony Guergis (X)	615	

== Tay ==
Mayoral Candidate	Vote	%
Scott Warnock (X)	Acclaimed	

== Tiny ==
Mayoral Candidate	Vote	%
Ray Millar (X)	3,339	46.9%
Peggy Breckenridge	3,312	46.5%
Pete Davenport	474	6.6%

== Wasaga Beach ==
Mayoral Candidate	Vote	%
Cal Patterson (X)	3,419	68.2%
Steven Fishman	1,597	31.8%
