= Kellie Leitch =

Canadian surgeon and politician

The Honourable Kellie Leitch PC OOnt FRCSC
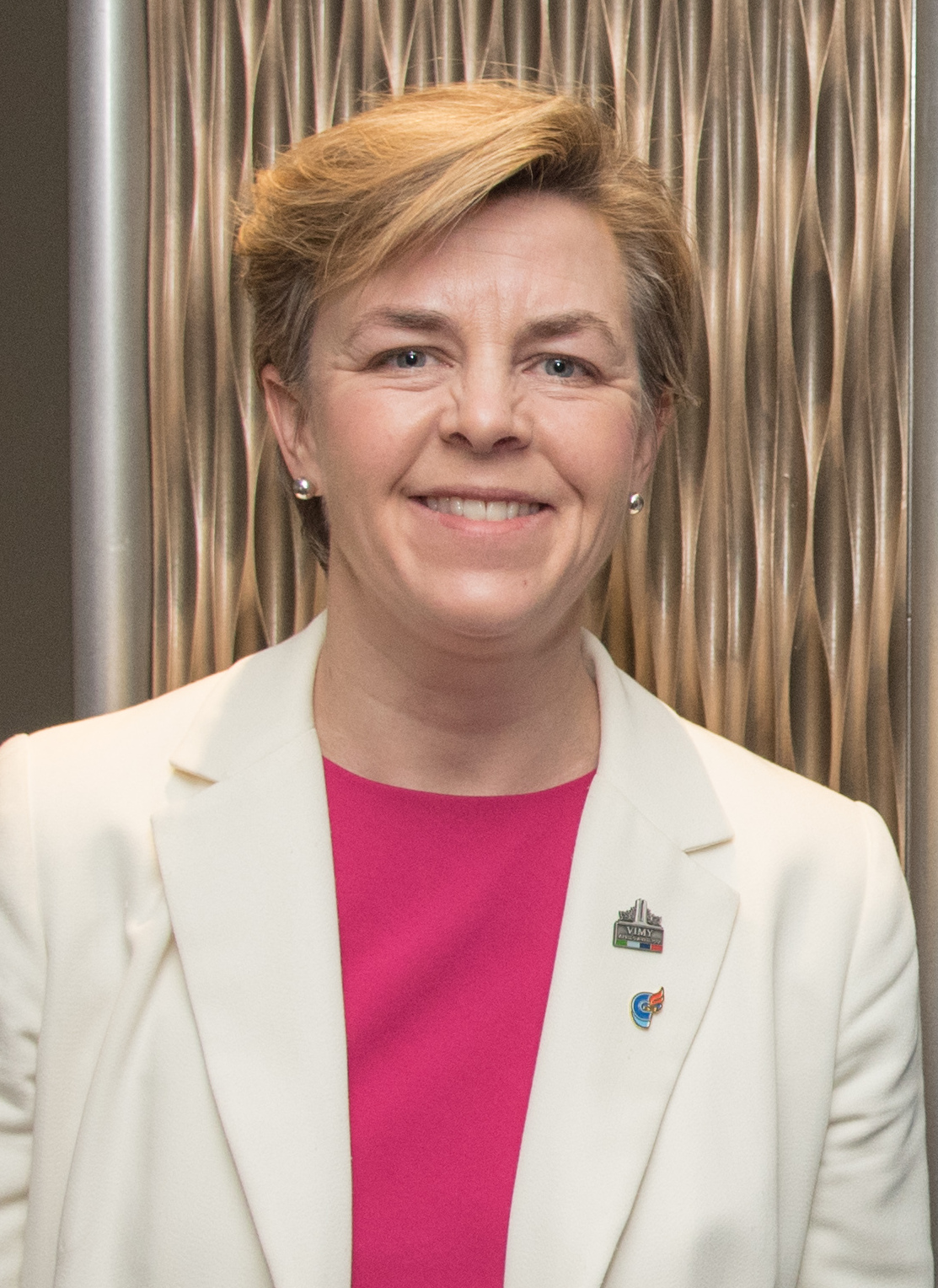
- Leitch in 2017

Minister of Labour
- In office July 15, 2013 – November 4, 2015
- Prime Minister: Stephen Harper
- Preceded by: Lisa Raitt
- Succeeded by: MaryAnn Mihychuk

Minister Responsible for the Status of Women
- In office July 15, 2013 – November 4, 2015
- Prime Minister: Stephen Harper
- Preceded by: Rona Ambrose
- Succeeded by: Patty Hajdu

Member of the Canadian Parliament for Simcoe—Grey
- In office May 2, 2011 – September 11, 2019
- Preceded by: Helena Guergis
- Succeeded by: Terry Dowdall

Personal details
- Born: Khristinn Kellie Leitch; July 30, 1970 (age 56) Winnipeg, Manitoba, Canada
- Party: Conservative
- Other political affiliations: Progressive Conservative (Ontario)
- Education: Queen's University; University of Toronto (M.D.); Dalhousie University (M.B.A.)
- Profession: Orthopaedic paediatric surgeon; professor
- Field: Business, medicine
- Institution(s): University of Southern California; University of Western Ontario
- Board: CANFAR, National Research Council, YMCA, Genome Canada
- Website: kellieleitchmp.com

Dr. Khristinn Kellie Leitch PC OOnt FRCSC (born July 30, 1970) is a Canadian surgeon and former politician who served as the Member of Parliament for the riding of Simcoe—Grey from 2011 to 2019 as a member of the Conservative Party. She was first elected in the 2011 federal election, succeeding Member of Parliament Helena Guergis who was dismissed from the Conservative Party caucus. Following her election, Leitch was appointed as the Parliamentary Secretary to the Minister of Human Resources and Skills Development. On July 15, 2013, Prime Minister Stephen Harper named Leitch Minister of Labour and Minister for the Status of Women. She served in Cabinet until the defeat of the Conservative government in the 2015 federal election. Leitch ran in the 2017 contest for the leadership of the Conservative Party. On January 23, 2018, Leitch announced that she would not be seeking re-election for the 43rd Canadian federal election and would return to being a full-time surgeon.

== Early life, training, and medical career ==
Leitch was born in Winnipeg, Manitoba and raised in the Beacon Hill neighbourhood of Fort McMurray, Alberta. She is the daughter of Eleanor Lynne (Conway) and Kelburne "Kit" McNabb Leitch, who owned a construction company in Fort McMurray.

She graduated from Queen's University in 1991 with an undergraduate degree. She earned her MD from the University of Toronto in 1994, MBA from Dalhousie University in 1998, and completed the Orthopaedic Surgery Residency Program in 2001 at the University of Toronto. She became a fellow of clinical paediatric orthopaedics at Children's Hospital Los Angeles/University of Southern California in 2002.

Leitch formerly taught at the University of Western Ontario, where she served as the assistant dean of external affairs at the Schulich School of Medicine and Dentistry, and is a former chair of paediatric surgery at the Children's Hospital of Western Ontario.

She was an orthopaedic paediatric surgeon at SickKids Hospital for one year before pursuing a career in politics. Leitch is also an associate professor at the University of Toronto.

Leitch was the founding chair of the Ivey Centre for Health Innovation and Leadership and led the health sector stream of the MBA programme at the Richard Ivey School of Business located at the University of Western Ontario.

In 2009, Leitch founded the Kids Health Foundation (now known as The Sandbox Project), an organization that sought to work with academia, the not-for-profit sector, government and industry to make Canada the healthiest place on earth for children to grow up.

Leitch maintained her medical credentials while serving in politics, and had hospital privileges at Children's Hospital of Eastern Ontario in Ottawa.

== Political involvement ==
Leitch is an active member of the Conservative Party of Canada and the Progressive Conservative Party of Ontario. She was a strategist in Progressive Conservative MPP Christine Elliott's leadership bid in 2009. She also served as president of the Ontario PC Campus Association, and has been actively involved in the Conservative Party since she was 14.

Leitch served as chair of the expert panel for the Children's Fitness Tax Credit in 2006, which made recommendations to Jim Flaherty, Minister of Finance, regarding the best ways to implement this tax credit designed to encourage health and fitness among Canadian children. In 2008, Leitch authored the report entitled Reaching for the Top: A Report by the Advisor on Healthy Children & Youth. The report is a "call to action" for government and industry on key issues affecting Canadian children and youth.

Leitch serves on the boards for CANFAR, the National Research Council, YMCA, and Genome Canada, among others.

== Federal politics ==
On September 17, 2010, The Globe and Mail reported that Leitch would run for the Conservative nomination in Simcoe–Grey. The seat was, at the time, held by Helena Guergis, who was expelled from the Conservative Party. The Globe described Leitch as a "star candidate" and noted that her launch event in Creemore the following day would include former Ontario premier Bill Davis and federal Finance Minister Jim Flaherty.

Leitch won the nomination over Collingwood mayor Chris Carrier and Paul Throop with 67% of all ballots cast in a large turnout. Leitch won the general election with more votes than any candidate for public office had ever received in Simcoe–Grey, with 31,784 ballots cast for her and a plurality of 20,590 votes, or 49.36% of the vote. Following her election, Leitch was appointed as the Parliamentary Secretary to the Minister of Human Resources and Skills Development.

=== Minister of Labour and Minister for the Status of Women ===
As part of the February 2014 budget, Leitch announced a $25 million plan to address violence against aboriginal women and girls.

On July 15, 2013, Prime Minister Harper named Leitch Minister of Labour and Minister for the Status of Women. During the 2015 Canadian federal election, Leitch said that she was pro-life when asked at a local debate, citing her experience as a paediatric surgeon as her reason.

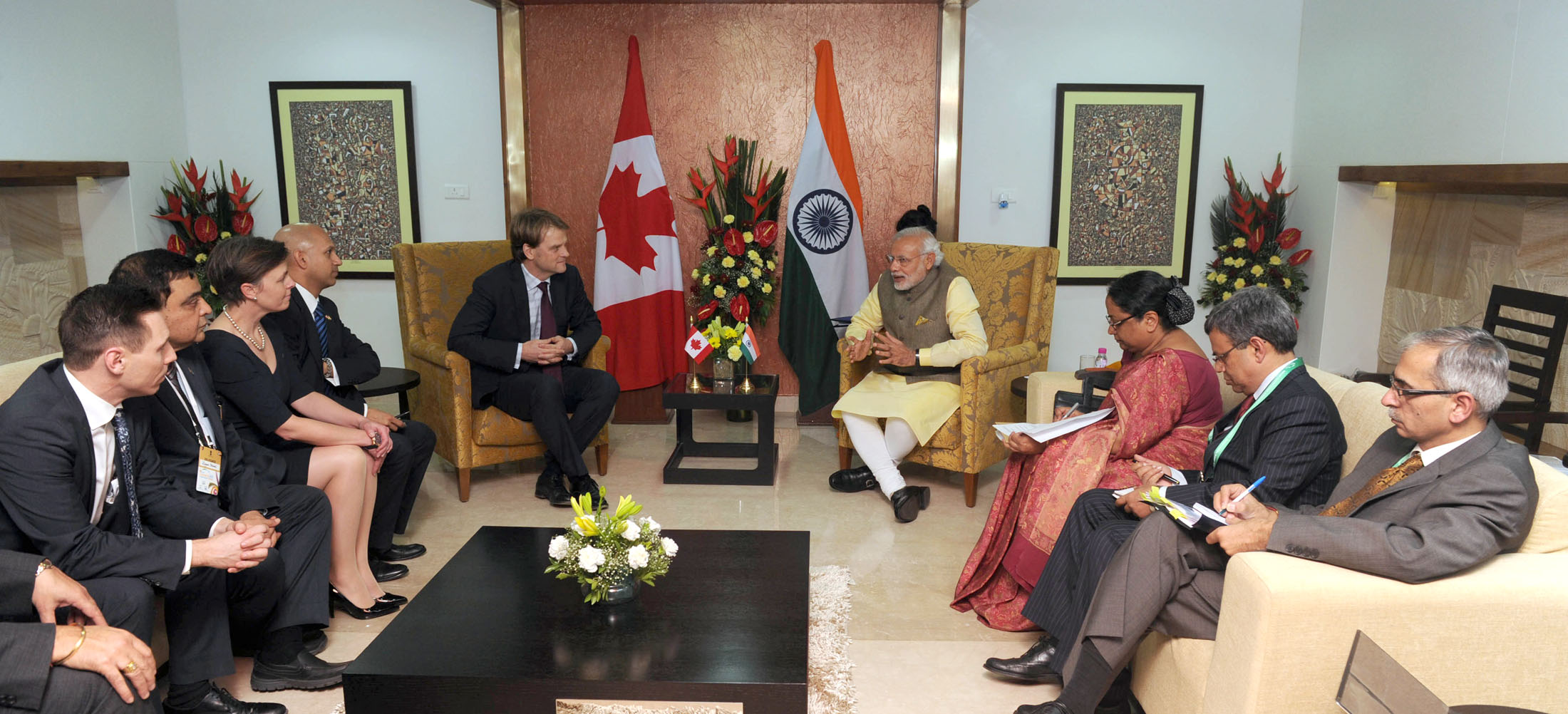
Leitch in India as part of a Canadian delegation led by Chris Alexander in 2015.

On October 2, 2015, during the general election, Leitch and then-Minister of Citizenship and Immigration Chris Alexander announced a Royal Canadian Mounted Police "tip line" where Canadians could report "barbaric cultural practices", which, along with the niqab issue, was widely viewed as an attempt to keep cultural and immigration issues at the forefront of the election campaign. Leitch later expressed regret in her involvement of the "barbaric cultural practices tip line". However, in an interview, on the statement the tip line "is a good idea but wasn't communicated as effectively as it could be to the public" she characterized it as being "absolutely correct".

=== Conservative leadership election ===
Although Leitch was re-elected in the 2015 election, the Conservatives were relegated to Official Opposition status. During the election, Leitch campaigned with over 70 Conservative candidates, which prepared the groundwork for her participation in the 2017 Conservative leadership election to replace Stephen Harper. Leitch's policy stances faced similar controversy in October 2015 during the federal election, where she and fellow Conservative MP and Immigration Minister Chris Alexander pledged support and funding to establish a tip-line for Canadians to call in regards to what they called "barbaric cultural practices". Leitch has since made an effort to apologize for her role in the proposed legislation, saying that she regrets her decisions.

She recruited Nick Kouvalis and Richard Ciano to head her leadership campaign, and Andy Pringle of the Toronto Police Services Board was her chief fundraiser. Leitch was the first official candidate to enter the race.

As part of her leadership campaign, Leitch proposed a Canadian value screening for all new residents. Michael Chong, Conservative MP for Wellington-Halton Hills and an opponent of Leitch in the leadership race, spoke out against Leitch's proposal, saying that it "does not represent our Conservative Party or our Canada". Despite the censure, Leitch stood by her proposal. In a September interview with the Canadian Press, Leitch made the following statement in response to the backlash she had been receiving: "I don't think it's intolerant to believe in a set of values that we expect everyone to share here and include those people who are coming to visit or immigrate to Canada." The focus of her campaign around the policies surprised some of her long-time mentors, such as former Conservative senator Hugh Segal, who couldn't support her leadership bid.

Leitch proposed screening visitors, refugees and immigrants for "Canadian values". This process would include face to face interviews by trained immigration officers with 100% of immigrants, rather than the 10% or so that happens now, with questions pertaining to their views on whether Canadian law should be the only set of laws that applies to all Canadians, hate speech, violence, and equality between genders, sexual orientation, religious & political views. Stephen Maher, based on information he received from former staffers of Letich, argued that her campaign manager Nick Kouvalis, thought that it would give Leitch, a way to win.

In a November 9, 2016 interview with Toronto Life magazine, Leitch cited the belief that gays should not be sentenced to death as an example of one such Canadian value.

During the campaign she was endorsed by Council of European Canadians, but her campaign rejected the endorsement. Regarding the endorsement, Leitch said that for anyone to think her campaign is in any way based on ethnic nationalism is to be willfully ignorant of what her campaign is about.

Leitch finished sixth in the race.

=== After the leadership race ===
She was not included into Andrew Scheer's shadow cabinet. In December 2017, it was reported that Essa Township mayor Terry Dowdall and physician Gillian Yeates were challenging Leitch for the Conservative nomination in Simcoe—Grey for the next election. On January 23, 2018, Leitch announced that she would not seek re-election. Leitch threw her support towards Marc Biss and Tim Bulmer, to be the party candidate for her riding arguing that they were "real conservatives" while believing Yeates and Dowdall were not. On March 24, it was announced that Dowdall won the party nomination for her riding after it was rumoured that he defeated Yeates on the third ballot.

On January 23, 2018, Leitch announced that she would not be seeking re-election for the 43rd Canadian federal election and would return to being a full-time surgeon. As of December 1, 2019, she is chief of orthopaedic surgery at Children's of Mississippi in Jackson, Mississippi, United States.

== Personal life ==
Leitch was raised a Catholic, and still practices the religion.

== Electoral history ==
2015 Canadian federal election: Simcoe—Grey
Party	Candidate	Votes	%	±%	Expenditures
Conservative	Kellie Leitch	30,612	46.6	-1.8	$101,505.22
Liberal	Mike MacEachern	25,352	38.6	+25.9	$55,545.97
New Democratic	David Matthews	6,332	9.6	-7.8	$5,106.83
Green	JoAnne Fleming	2,923	4.4	-1.1	$5,324.15
Christian Heritage	Len Noordegraaf	528	0.8	–	$3,879.16
Total valid votes/Expense limit		65,747	100.0		$242,062.43
Total rejected ballots		225	–	–	
Turnout		65,972	–	–	
Eligible voters		97,145			
Source: Elections Canada

2011 Canadian federal election: Simcoe—Grey
Party	Candidate	Votes	%	±%	Expenditures
Conservative	Kellie Leitch	31,784	49.36	-5.68	$96,128.50
New Democratic	Katy Austin	11,185	17.38	+6.18	7,993.48
Independent	Helena Guergis	8,714	13.50	–	57,289.66
Liberal	Alex Smardenka	8,207	12.75	-8.80	83,148.92
Green	Jace Metheral	3,482	5.41	-4.71	8,522.13
Christian Heritage	Peter Vander Zaag	757	1.18	–	4,385.89
Canadian Action	Gord Cochrane	244	0.38	–	2,512.75
Total valid votes/Expense limit		64,373	100.00	–	$99,651.72
Total rejected ballots		269	0.42	+0.08	
Turnout		64,642	66.13	+6.03	
Eligible voters		97,755	–	–	
Conservative hold		Swing		-5.93	

28th Canadian Ministry (2006–2015) – Cabinet of Stephen Harper
Cabinet post (1)
Predecessor	Office	Successor
Lisa Raitt	Minister of Labour; 2013–2015	MaryAnn Mihychuk
