= Collingwood Terminals Limited =

Grain elevators in Ontario, Canada

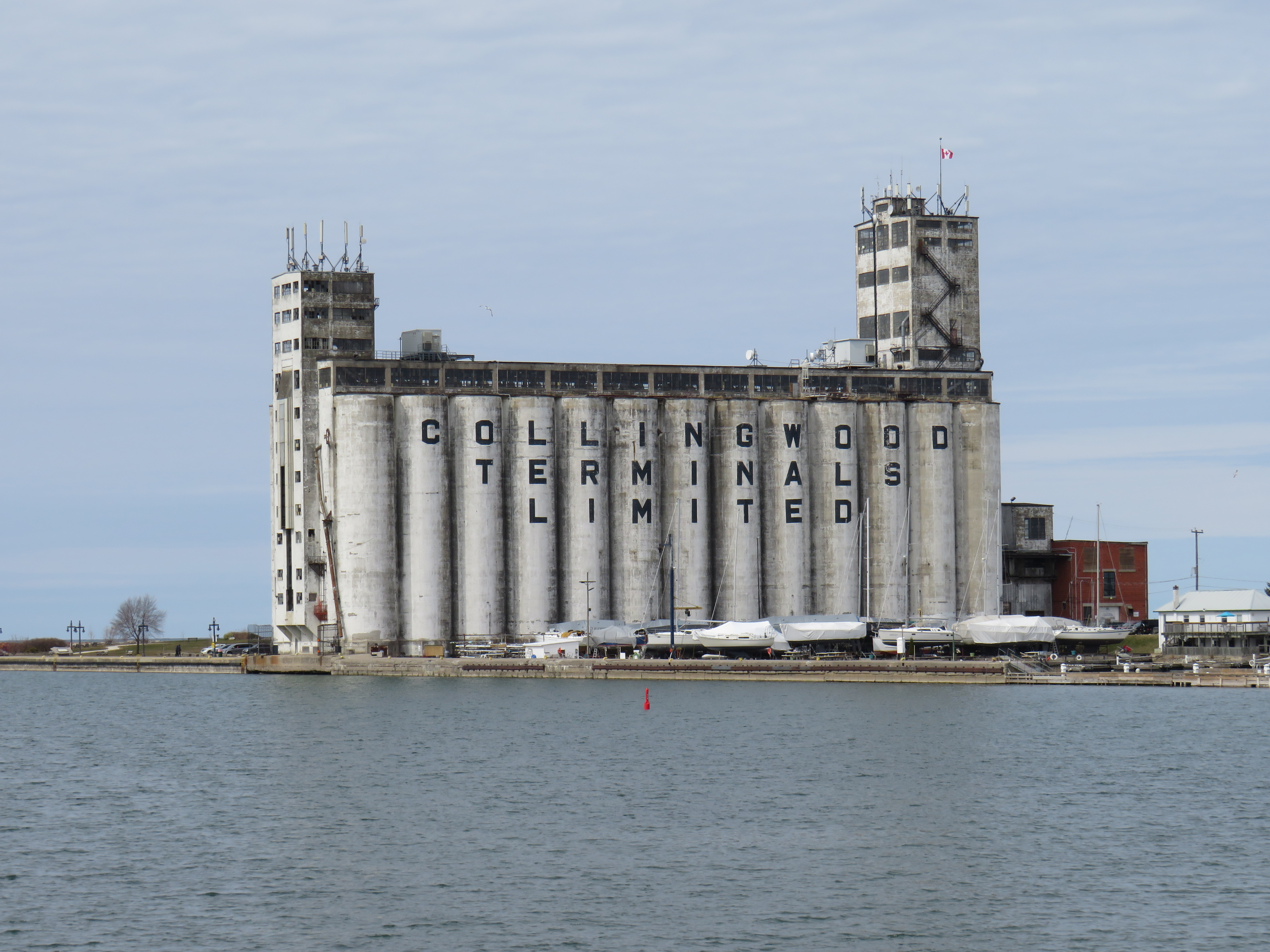
Collingwood Terminals grain elevator

The Collingwood Terminals Limited are former grain elevators located on the waterfront in Collingwood, Ontario, Canada. Completed in 1929, the terminals served as a major grain storage and shipment facility on Georgian Bay for more than six decades. Constructed during a period of rapid growth in Great Lakes shipping, the facility became a prominent feature of Collingwood's waterfront and is regarded as a significant example of the town's industrial heritage. Operations ceased in 1993, and the property was acquired by the Town of Collingwood in 1997. The terminals are the subject of ongoing heritage preservation and redevelopment planning.

== History ==
The terminals were built by Collingwood Terminals Limited as the town's third grain elevator, replacing earlier wooden structures that had served the harbour. The reinforced concrete structure was constructed in open water using a continuous concrete pour over a wooden framework. The structure rises approximately 180 feet (55 m), and was completed over 13 days. The terminals sit on a foundation of 4078 wooden piles that were driven into the lake bed.

The terminals featured 52-grain silos that could store up to two million bushels of grain and could handle 30,000 bushels of grain per hour. Grain that arrived by rail was transferred into the storage silos before being loaded onto ships to travel throughout the Great Lakes and beyond. For much of the twentieth century, the terminals were a key component of Collingwood's waterfront economy alongside the nearby shipyards. The first ship to the terminals was the steamer Minesing from Chicago carrying 275,000 bushels of corn in September 1929.

Grain handling operations ceased in 1993 after approximately 64 years of operation. Major equipment was sold before the site was abandoned. The Town of Collingwood purchased the property in 1997. Since then, the terminals have remained one of the town's most prominent waterfront landmarks. Heritage organizations have identified the structure as a significant example of Collingwood's industrial and transportation history and one of the defining features of the harbour skyline, seen from miles around the area.

== Redevelopment ==
Following the Town of Collingwood's acquisition of the property in 1997, several proposals for demolition, preservation, and adaptive reuse were considered before redevelopment planning formally began in 2019. Heritage assessments, engineering studies, and redevelopment proposals have examined opportunities to preserve the historic grain elevators while adapting the site for new residential, commercial, hospitality, and public uses. It would cost $10 million to maintain the structure or $5 million to tear it down. There is considerable public support to preserve the terminals, preserving the iconic symbol of the community, but there are strong opponents on both sides.

In August 2022, Streetcar Developments Inc. and Dream Unlimited Corporation were chosen for the redevelopment project. Their proposal includes the redevelopment of Heritage Drive and the adaptive reuse of the terminals as a hotel, restaurant, event venue, and residential development. Early project estimates placed the cost of converting the terminals at approximately $200 million.

The Town planned to complete two project milestones by early 2025. They intended to complete a draft plan for the public spaces and submit official plan amendment and rezoning applications. As of 2026, planning and design work for the redevelopment project is ongoing.

== In popular culture ==
The Collingwood Terminals were featured in the season 11 finale of The Amazing Race Canada, which aired on September 16, 2025. The site hosted the opening Double Roadblock challenge, in which one team member navigated the interior of the abandoned grain terminals while the other climbed the exterior silos to retrieve grain bags using information gathered inside. The finale showcased the terminals as one of several landmarks featured during the concluding leg of the race in Collingwood and The Blue Mountains.
