= Simcoe—Grey (federal electoral district) =

Federal electoral district in Ontario, Canada

Coordinates: 44.375°N 80.008°W

Ontario electoral district
- Interactive map of riding boundaries from the 2025 federal election

Federal electoral district
- Legislature: House of Commons
MP
Terry Dowdall
Conservative
- District created: 1996
- First contested: 1997
- Last contested: 2025
- District webpage: profile, map

Demographics
- Population (2011): 116,307
- Electors (2015): 95,511
- Area (km²): 1,950
- Pop. density (per km²): 59.6
- Census division(s): Simcoe, Grey
- Census subdivision(s): Wasaga Beach, Collingwood, Essa, Clearview, Adjala-Tosorontio, The Blue Mountains

Simcoe—Grey is a federal electoral district in Ontario, Canada, that has been represented in the House of Commons of Canada since 1997.

It was created in 1996 from parts of Barrie—Simcoe—Bradford, Bruce—Grey, Simcoe Centre, Simcoe North, Wellington—Grey—Dufferin—Simcoe and York—Simcoe.

It consists of the municipalities of Blue Mountains, Collingwood, Clearview, Wasaga Beach, Essa, and Adjala-Tosorontio. It had a population of 117,505 in 2001, and an area of 2,515 km².

== History ==
It consisted initially of parts of the County of Simcoe and the County of Grey.

In 2003, it was given its current boundaries as described above.

This riding lost territory to Barrie—Springwater—Oro-Medonte during the 2012 electoral redistribution.

Following the 2022 Canadian federal electoral redistribution, it lost New Tecumseth to New Tecumseth—Gwillimbury.

== Demographics ==
According to the 2021 Canadian census, 2023 representation

Racial groups: 90.9% White, 2.8% Indigenous, 1.4% Black, 1.4% South Asian
Languages: 89.0% English, 2.5% French, 1.2% Italian
Religions: 56.1% Christian (23.0% Catholic, 7.5% United Church, 6.8% Anglican, 3.7% Presbyterian, 1.2% Baptist, 1.0% Pentecostal, 12.9% Other), 41.3% None
Median income: $42,400 (2020)
Average income: $56,900 (2020)

== Riding associations ==
Riding associations are the local branches of the national political parties:

Party	Association name	CEO	HQ city
Christian Heritage Party of Canada	CHP Simcoe—Grey	Marilee Kidd	The Blue Mountains
Conservative Party of Canada	Simcoe—Grey Conservative Association	Duane P. McNabb	Clearview
Green Party of Canada	Simcoe—Grey Green Party Association	Nicholas N. Clayton	The Blue Mountains
Liberal Party of Canada	Simcoe—Grey Federal Liberal Association	Courtney Rose Demers	Toronto
New Democratic Party	Simcoe—Grey Federal NDP Riding Association	vacant	Wasaga Beach

== Members of Parliament ==
This riding has elected the following members of Parliament:

Parliament	Years	Member	Party
Simcoe—Grey; Riding created from Barrie—Simcoe—Bradford, Bruce—Grey, Simcoe Centre, Simcoe North, Wellington—Grey—Dufferin—Simcoe and York—Simcoe
36th	1997–2000	Paul Bonwick	Liberal
37th	2000–2004	Paul Bonwick	Liberal
38th	2004–2006	Helena Guergis	Conservative
39th	2006–2008	Helena Guergis	Conservative
40th	2008–2010	Helena Guergis	Conservative
40th	2010–2011	Helena Guergis	Independent
41st	2011–2015	Kellie Leitch	Conservative
42nd	2015–2019	Kellie Leitch	Conservative
43rd	2019–2021	Terry Dowdall	Conservative
44th	2021–2025	Terry Dowdall	Conservative
45th	2025–present	Terry Dowdall	Conservative

== Election results ==
Graph of election results in Simcoe—Grey (minor parties that never got 2% of the vote or didn't run consistently are omitted)

2025 Canadian federal election
Party	Candidate	Votes	%	±%
Conservative	Terry Dowdall	35,364	52.08	+4.65
Liberal	Bren Munro	29,455	43.38	+15.49
New Democratic	Jasleen Bains	1,574	2.32	−10.86
Green	Allan Kuhn	991	1.46	−2.69
People's	Giorgio Mammoliti	523	0.77	−6.17
Total valid votes		67,907	99.41	
Total rejected ballots		402	0.59	+0.01
Turnout		68,309	71.45	+6.73
Eligible voters		95,606		
Conservative notional hold		Swing		−5.42
Source: Elections Canada

2021 federal election redistributed results
Party	Vote	%
Conservative	26,910	47.42
Liberal	15,822	27.88
New Democratic	7,476	13.17
People's	3,938	6.94
Green	2,356	4.15
Christian Heritage	242	0.43
Total valid votes	56,744	99.42
Rejected ballots	329	0.58
Registered voters/ estimated turnout	88,193	64.71

2021 Canadian federal election
Party	Candidate	Votes	%	±%	Expenditures
Conservative	Terry Dowdall	36,249	47.3	+3.8	$77,055.07
Liberal	Bren Munro	21,320	27.8	-3.9	$15,794.64
New Democratic	Lucas Gillies	10,140	13.2	+2.0	$4,394.15
People's	Adam Minatel	5,550	7.2	+5.3	$16,038.13
Green	Nick Clayton	2,969	3.9	-10.1	$3,494.50
Christian Heritage	Ken Stouffer	382	0.5	–	$5,174.14
Total valid votes		76,610			
Total rejected ballots		436			
Turnout		77,046	63.60		
Eligible voters		121,142			
Source: Elections Canada

2019 Canadian federal election
Party	Candidate	Votes	%	±%	Expenditures
Conservative	Terry Dowdall	32,812	43.5	-3.1	$77,284.03
Liberal	Lorne Kenney	23,925	31.7	-6.9	none listed
Green	Sherri Jackson	8,589	11.4	+7.0	$13,135.30
New Democratic	Ilona Matthews	8,462	11.2	+1.6	$4,265.12
People's	Richard Sommer	1,416	1.9	–	none listed
Veterans Coalition	Tony D'Angelo	305	0.4		none listed
Total valid votes/expense limit		75,509	100.0		
Total rejected ballots		492			
Turnout		76,001	66.0		
Eligible voters		115,193			
Conservative hold		Swing		+1.90	
Source: Elections Canada

2015 Canadian federal election: Simcoe—Grey
Party	Candidate	Votes	%	±%	Expenditures
Conservative	Kellie Leitch	30,612	46.6	-1.8	$101,505.22
Liberal	Mike MacEachern	25,352	38.6	+25.9	$55,545.97
New Democratic	David Matthews	6,332	9.6	-7.8	$5,106.83
Green	JoAnne Fleming	2,923	4.4	-1.1	$5,324.15
Christian Heritage	Len Noordegraaf	528	0.8	–	$3,879.16
Total valid votes/Expense limit		65,747	100.0		$242,062.43
Total rejected ballots		225	–	–	
Turnout		65,972	–	–	
Eligible voters		97,145			
Conservative hold		Swing		-13.85	
Source: Elections Canada

2011 federal election redistributed results
Party	Vote	%
Conservative	26,764	48.43
New Democratic	9,631	17.43
Others	8,806	15.94
Liberal	7,000	12.67
Green	3,058	5.53

2011 Canadian federal election: Simcoe—Grey
Party	Candidate	Votes	%	±%	Expenditures
Conservative	Kellie Leitch	31,784	49.36	-5.68	$96,128.50
New Democratic	Katy Austin	11,185	17.38	+6.18	7,993.48
Independent	Helena Guergis	8,714	13.50	–	57,289.66
Liberal	Alex Smardenka	8,207	12.75	-8.80	83,148.92
Green	Jace Metheral	3,482	5.41	-4.71	8,522.13
Christian Heritage	Peter Vander Zaag	757	1.18	–	4,385.89
Canadian Action	Gord Cochrane	244	0.38	–	2,512.75
Total valid votes/Expense limit		64,373	100.00	–	$99,651.72
Total rejected ballots		269	0.42	+0.08	
Turnout		64,642	66.13	+6.03	
Eligible voters		97,755	–	–	
Conservative hold		Swing		-5.93	

2008 Canadian federal election
Party	Candidate	Votes	%	±%	Expenditures
Conservative	Helena Guergis	30,897	55.04	+5.2	$71,239
Liberal	Andrea Matrosovs	12,099	21.55	-9.3	$36,810
New Democratic	Katy Austin	6,288	11.20	0.0	$6,077
Green	Peter Ellis	5,685	10.12	+4.5	$9,015
Christian Heritage	Peter Vander Zaag	1,018	1.81	-0.6	$4,175
Libertarian	Caley McKibbin	143	0.25	–	$20
Total valid votes/Expense limit		56,130	100.00	$94,127	
Total rejected ballots		189	0.34		
Turnout		56,319	60.10		

2006 Canadian federal election
Party	Candidate	Votes	%	±%	Expenditures
Conservative	Helena Guergis	30,135	49.8	+9.1	$84,182
Liberal	Elizabeth Kirley	18,689	30.9	-9.5	$92,500
New Democratic	Katy Austin	6,784	11.2	+1.2	$10,777
Green	Peter Ellis	3,372	5.6	+1.8	$2,361
Christian Heritage	Peter Vander Zaag	1,585	2.6	-1.5	$14,302
Total valid votes		60,565	100.0		

2004 Canadian federal election
Party	Candidate	Votes	%	±%
Conservative	Helena Guergis	22,496	40.6	-9.3
Liberal	Paul Bonwick	22,396	40.4	-4.3
New Democratic	Colin Mackinnon	5,532	10.0	+6.7
Green	Peter Ellis	2,668	4.8	
Christian Heritage	Peter Vander Zaag	2,285	4.1	
Total valid votes		55,377	100.0	

Note: Conservative vote is compared to the total of the Canadian Alliance vote and Progressive Conservative vote in 2000 election.

2000 Canadian federal election
Party	Candidate	Votes	%	±%
Liberal	Paul Bonwick	22,224	44.8	+9.6
Alliance	George Demery	16,113	32.5	-1.8
Progressive Conservative	Bill Dunkley	8,655	17.4	-5.7
New Democratic	Michael Kennedy	1,646	3.3	-2.8
Canadian Action	James McGillivray	751	1.5	
Independent	Victor Carvalho	246	0.5	
Total valid votes		49,635	100.0	

Note: Canadian Alliance vote is compared to the Reform vote in 1997 election.

1997 Canadian federal election
Party	Candidate	Votes	%
Liberal	Paul Bonwick	17,895	35.2
Reform	Paul Shaw	17,414	34.3
Progressive Conservative	Shawn Mitchell	11,761	23.1
New Democratic	Marty Wilkinson	3,090	6.1
Christian Heritage	Mia Colaris	664	1.3
Total valid votes		50,824	100.0

== See also ==
- List of Canadian electoral districts
- Historical federal electoral districts of Canada
