= Collingwood downtown heritage conservation district =

- Historic district
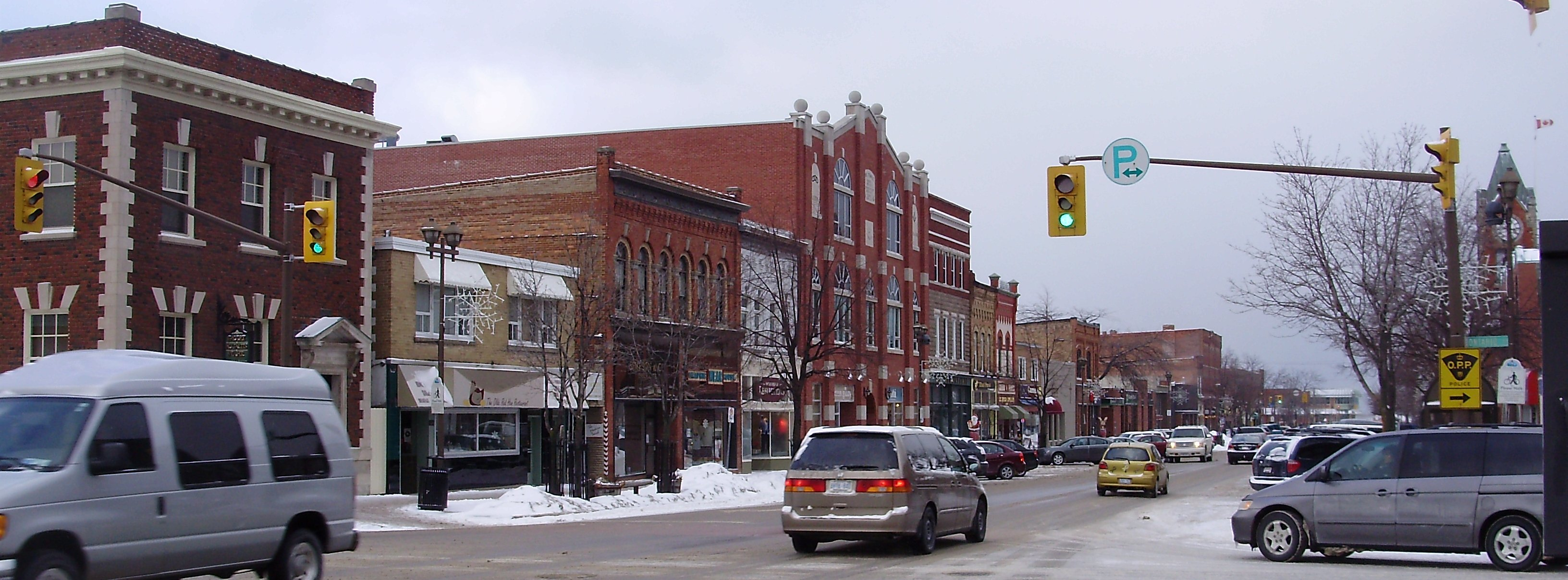
- View of Hurontario Street, looking north toward Georgian Bay
- Interactive map of Collingwood downtown heritage conservation district
- Coordinates: 44°30′N 80°13′W
- Country: Canada
- Province: Ontario
- City: Collingwood

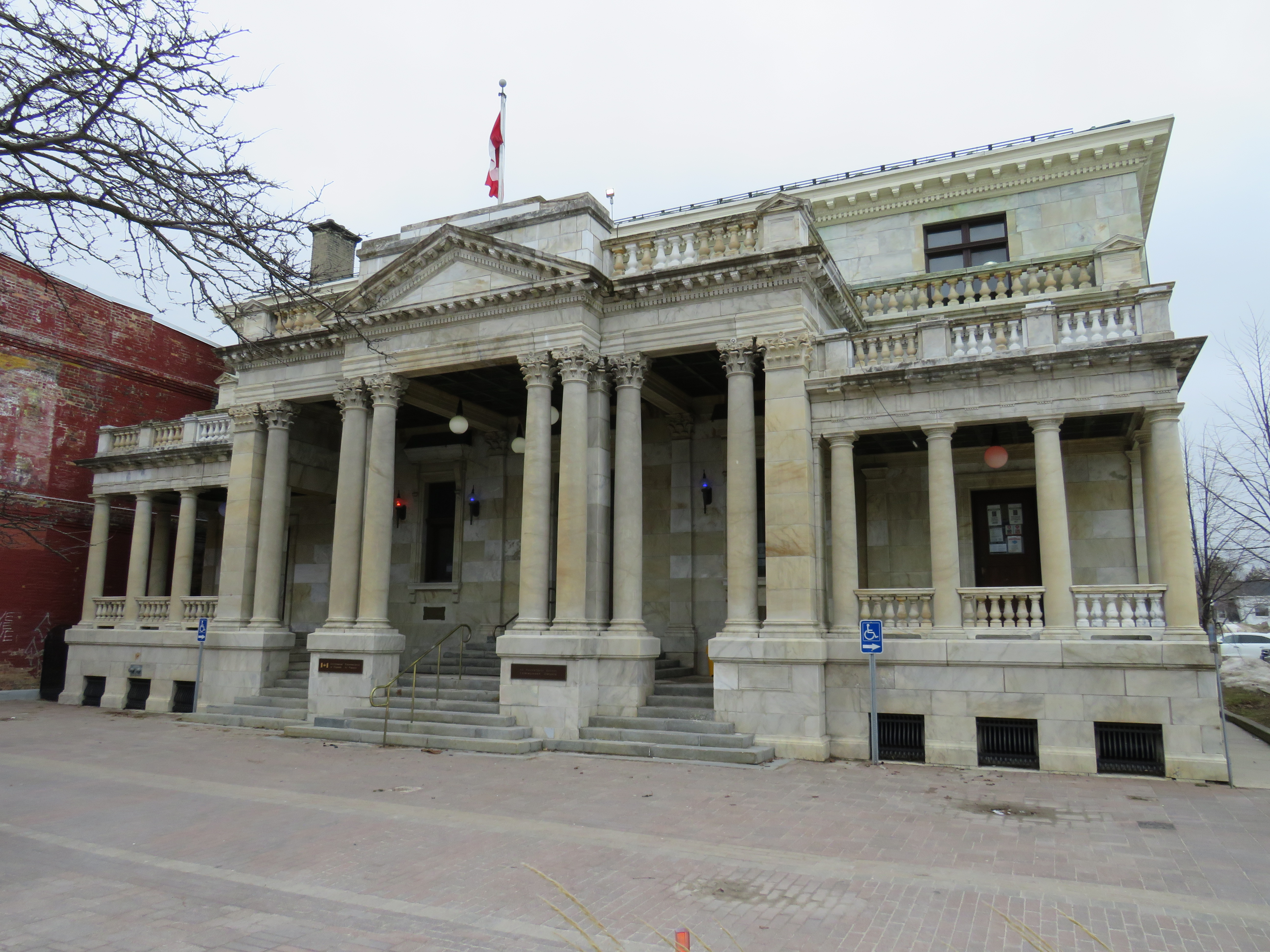
Federal Building

The town of Collingwood, Ontario, was the first municipality in Canada to have a heritage conservation district included on the Canadian Register of Historic Places.

== History ==
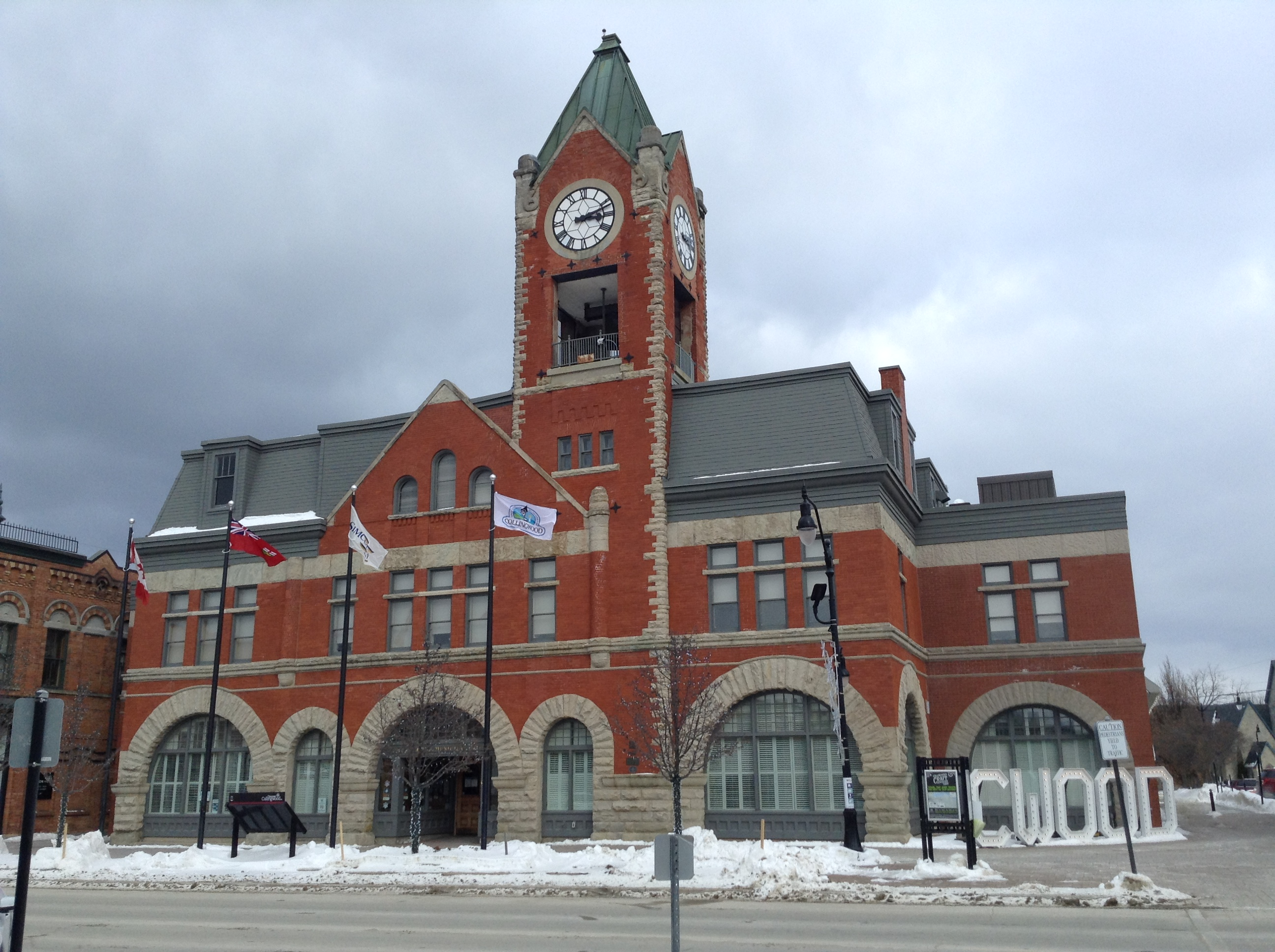
The Collingwood Town Hall is located within the downtown heritage conservation district.

The Collingwood downtown heritage conservation district was formally recognized on December 2, 2002, designated under Part V of the Ontario Heritage Act.

The heritage district is centred around Hurontario Street; the town’s main street. It houses a collection of commercial and public buildings, mostly built between 1880-1910, and is linked by streets and pedestrian pathways to enclaves of historic residential, institutional, and public buildings, as well as park spaces. Hurontario Street is among the best-preserved 19th century grand main streets in Ontario. It is wider (at 99') than the standard street (66') and is unique in maintaining the angled parking originally designed to accommodate the first automobiles in the town. Hurontario is also a historic road that connects Lakes Huron (Georgian Bay) and Ontario (in the City of Mississauga) from which the street gets its name. The district contains several individual properties designated under Part IV of the Ontario Heritage Act, including the Town Hall, as well as a Federal Heritage Building, The Collingwood Federal Building.

The Town of Collingwood By-law 2010-020 details which prosperities in the district are classified as a “Significant Heritage Building”. Owners of a “Significant Heritage Building” may be eligible for grants of up to $3000 and municipal tax refunds.

== Heritage district plan update ==
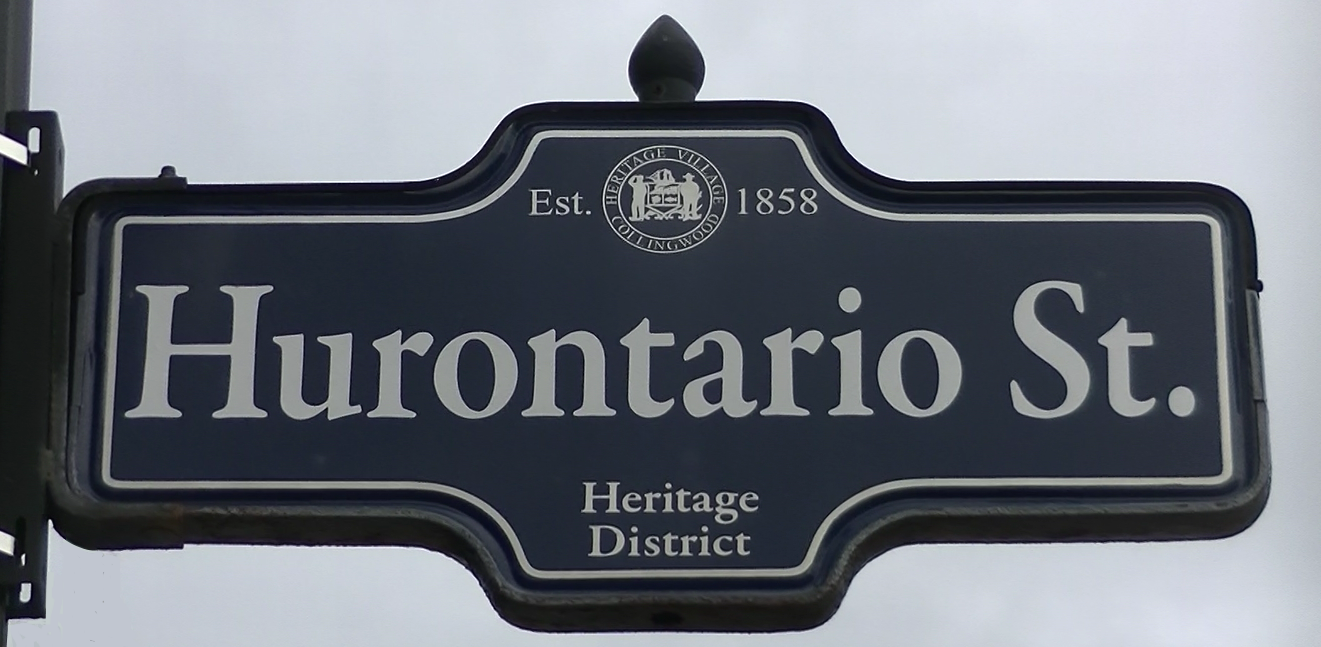
Decorative street sign in the heritage district

In 2002, the firm of Phillip H. Carter Architect and Planner recommended establishing a heritage district in a two-part report, Collingwood Downtown Heritage Conservation District Study and Plan and Collingwood Downtown Heritage Conservation District Inventory of Buildings. Following the recommendations of the report, the Town of Collingwood passed Bylaw 02-112 on December 2, 2002, to define the boundary of the district.

When Bylaw 02-112 was passed, Provincial legislation did not require municipalities to develop a plan for a heritage district nor to adopt a plan (should one be created) under bylaw. As a result, there was no reference in Bylaw 02-112 to the objectives, policies, design guidelines, and permit procedures recommended in the report by Carter. The bylaw itself provided only a map of the conservation district boundaries. The practice of Collingwood council and staff was to apply the recommendations in the report as if they were legally binding when, in fact, they were not.

The Collingwood downtown heritage conservation district plan was updated in 2008. The update was seen as a response to changes within the district since its founding in 2002 and a reaction to the amendment of the Ontario Heritage Act in 2005.

Section 41.1, introduced in the 2005 amendment, required the adoption by bylaw of a heritage conservation district plan, thereby making the objectives, policies, design guidelines, and permit procedures of a plan an enforceable requirement rather than advisory only.

== Demolition of heritage buildings ==
Under section 34 of the Ontario Heritage Act, council may issue permits for the demolition of buildings within a heritage conservation district. The Town of Collingwood council has allowed the destruction of at least eight historic buildings in spite of public opposition.
