= Tremont House (Collingwood, Ontario) =

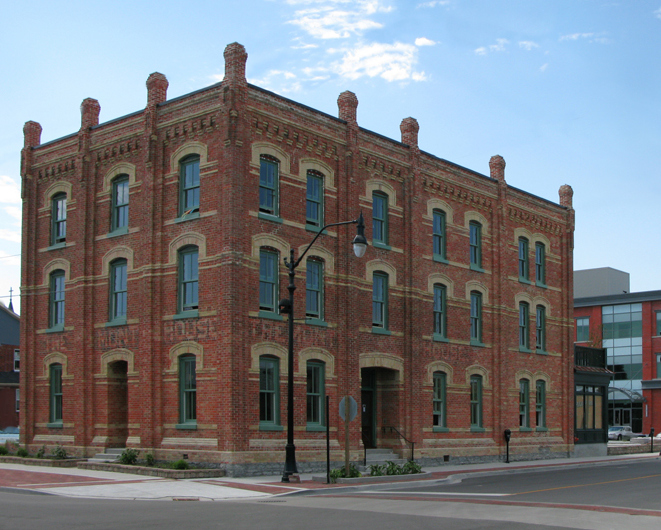
- Interactive map of the Tremont House area
- Alternative names: Tremont Hotel

General information
- Architectural style: Victorian
- Location: 80 Simcoe Street; Collingwood, Ontario; L9Y 1H8
- Coordinates: 44.501374°N 80.21425°W
- Completed: 1889; 137 years ago
- Renovated: 2010; 16 years ago

Technical details
- Floor count: 3

Tremont House, also known as the Tremont Hotel, is a historic building in the Creative Simcoe Street neighbourhood of the Collingwood Heritage Conservation District. It is located at 80 Simcoe Street in Collingwood, Ontario, Canada.

== History ==
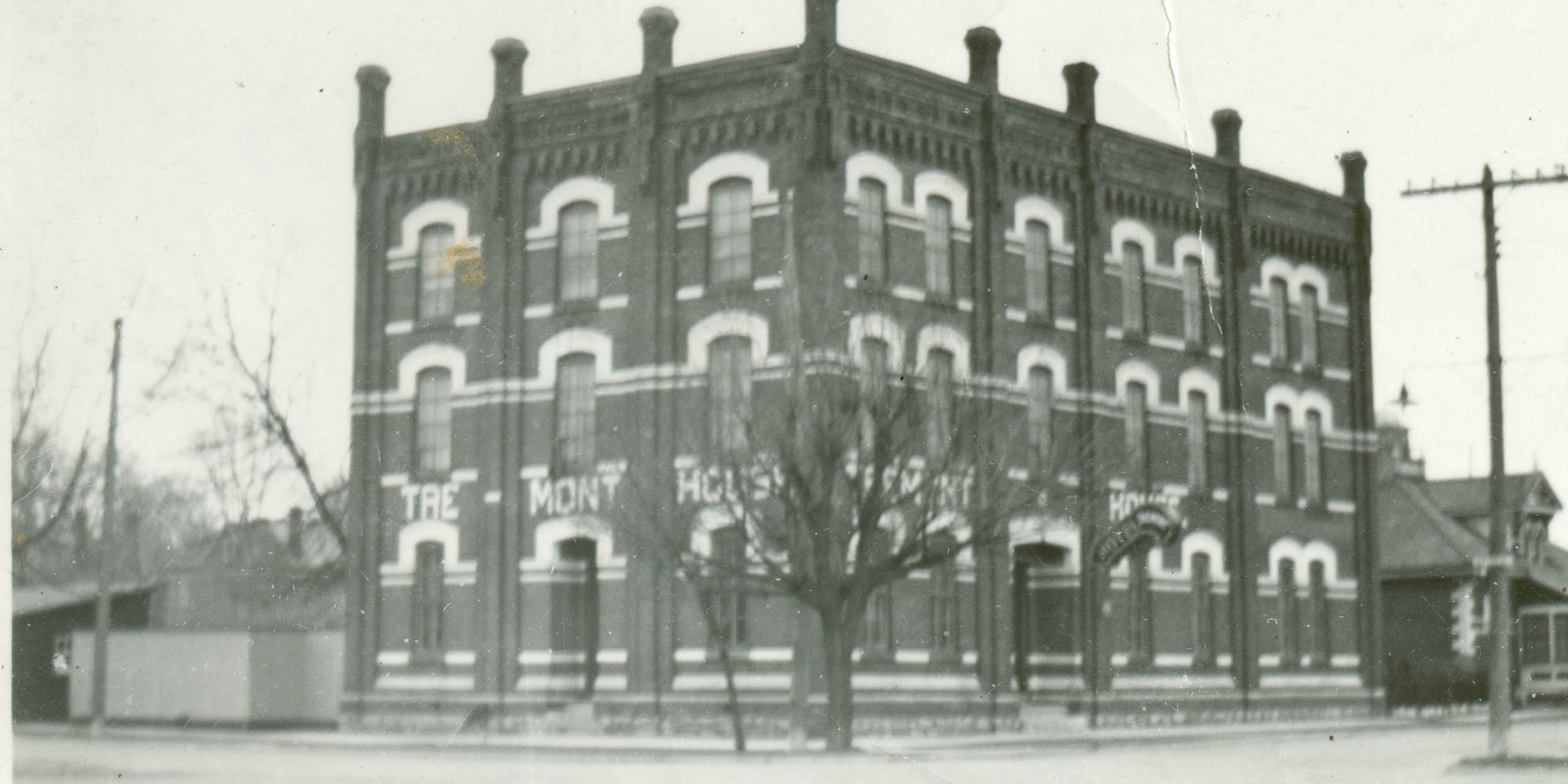
Tremont House, Collingwood, Ontario. The words "Tremont House" are painted on the building. The entrance sign reads "Tremont Hotel". Parapets intact along the roofline.

The Tremont House was built in 1889 by John McCormick. Located across the street from the town's train station at the time, it was originally a 24-room, luxury hotel. Started in March, the construction was completed in only three months. The hotel opened on June 27, 1889. The three-storey structure was built after a fire destroyed dozens of businesses in the downtown Collingwood area, at the time when many of the town's wooden buildings were being replaced by brick.

McCormick sold the building in 1922. The new owner did not fare well financially and tried to burn down the building, but was unsuccessful. Evidence of the fire still exists today. In 1936 the business was purchased by John (Jack) Armitage, who restored its reputation as a modest, well-appointed hotel and boarding house.

The hotel continued to operate for several decades but ultimately "... ended its life as a dingy bar" and closed, leaving a "...decrepit building ready for demolition...".

In 2004, the Collingwood town council announced its intention to demolish the building to create parking space for the downtown, and in 2005 the town purchased the property. The proposal met with objection as heritage advocates in the community lobbied to preserve the building.

In 2007 an affordable housing group proposed that the Tremont building be converted into an 18-unit affordable housing development. The project was realized at a different location.

In August 2007 then mayor, Chris Carrier, said the plan to tear down the building remained but he was open to other ideas, including building a new Cultural Centre. Some town councillors remained in favour of preserving the building. The Cultural Centre suggestion generated enough support for the town to sign a memorandum of understanding with Theatre Collingwood in 2008. However, the agreement was terminated that same year under pressure from the Heritage Committee and residents to preserve the building.

=== Restoration ===
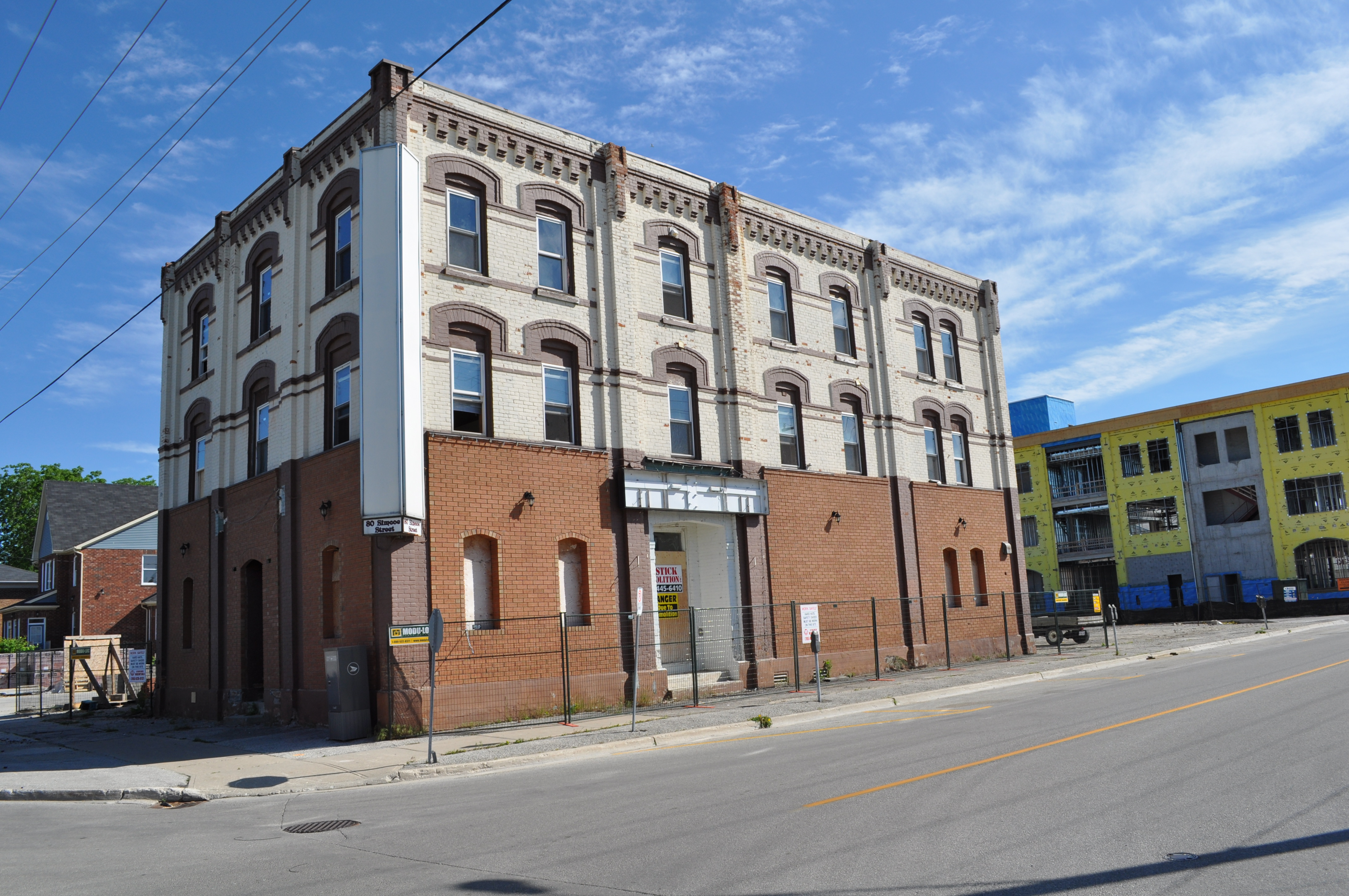
Tremont House, Collingwood, Ontario (c. 2005), lower windows boarded and slated for demolition. Rooftop parapets removed.

On May 25, 2009, town council approved private sale of the building. The town retained the surrounding land to build the parking lot originally proposed five years earlier.

The Tremont rehabilitation returned several exterior features of the building to the original aesthetic. The brick facade around the ground level of the building and the white paint that covered the upper two stories were removed to reveal the original brick. The words "Tremont House", painted on the exterior during the original construction, are once again visible. The rooftop parapets were restored, although only to about half their original height.

With support from the town to use the adjacent parking lot for outdoor celebrations, the restored Tremont Hotel had a grand reopening celebration on September 17, 2010.

The restoration won a Heritage Award from Heritage Collingwood, the 2010 Peter Stokes Award for Restoration from the Architectural Conservancy of Ontario, and a national revitalization award in the Building Rehabilitation and Conservation category from the National BIA. Restoration of the Tremont has been credited as the cornerstone and catalyst for transforming the neighbourhood.

Today, the Tremont building houses artist studios, art gallery space, residences and a restaurant.

The Tremont House is featured in the Town of Collingwood East Heritage Walk.
