= Terry Dowdall =

Canadian politician

Terry Dowdall MP

Member of Parliament for Simcoe—Grey
- Incumbent
- Assumed office October 21, 2019
- Preceded by: Kellie Leitch

Personal details
- Born: 1964 or 1965 (age 60–61)
- Party: Conservative Party of Canada

Terry Dowdall MP (born 1964 or 1965) is a Canadian politician who was elected to represent the riding of Simcoe—Grey in the House of Commons of Canada in the 2019 Canadian federal election. He is a former mayor of Essa, Ontario.

At the time of the 2025 Canadian federal election, he lived in New Lowell, Ontario.

== Electoral record ==
=== Federal ===
2025 Canadian federal election: Simcoe—Grey
Party	Candidate	Votes	%	±%	Expenditures
Conservative	Terry Dowdall	35,364	52.08	+4.66	
Liberal	Bren Munro	29,455	43.38	+15.50	
New Democratic	Jasleen Bains	1,574	2.32	−10.85	
Green	Allan Kuhn	991	1.46	−2.69	
People's	Giorgio Mammoliti	523	0.77	−6.17	
Total valid votes/expense limit		67,907	99.41		
Total rejected ballots		402	0.59		
Turnout		68,309	71.78		
Eligible voters		95,169			
Conservative notional hold		Swing		−5.42	
Source: Elections Canada
Note: number of eligible voters does not include voting day registrations.

2021 Canadian federal election: Simcoe—Grey
Party	Candidate	Votes	%	±%	Expenditures
Conservative	Terry Dowdall	36,249	47.3	+3.8	$77,055.07
Liberal	Bren Munro	21,320	27.8	-3.9	$15,794.64
New Democratic	Lucas Gillies	10,140	13.2	+2.0	$4,394.15
People's	Adam Minatel	5,550	7.2	+5.3	$16,038.13
Green	Nick Clayton	2,969	3.9	-10.1	$3,494.50
Christian Heritage	Ken Stouffer	382	0.5	–	$5,174.14
Total valid votes		76,610			
Total rejected ballots		436			
Turnout		77,046	63.60		
Eligible voters		121,142			
Source: Elections Canada

2019 Canadian federal election: Simcoe—Grey
Party	Candidate	Votes	%	±%	Expenditures
Conservative	Terry Dowdall	32,812	43.5	-3.1	$77,284.03
Liberal	Lorne Kenney	23,925	31.7	-6.9	none listed
Green	Sherri Jackson	8,589	11.4	+7.0	$13,135.30
New Democratic	Ilona Matthews	8,462	11.2	+1.6	$4,265.12
People's	Richard Sommer	1,416	1.9	–	none listed
Veterans Coalition	Tony D'Angelo	305	0.4		none listed
Total valid votes/expense limit		75,509	100.0		
Total rejected ballots		492			
Turnout		76,001	66.0		
Eligible voters		115,193			
Conservative hold		Swing		+1.90	
Source: Elections Canada

=== Municipal ===
2014 Essa mayoral election
Mayoral Candidate	Vote	%
Terry Dowdall (X)	2,452	63.90
Archie Duckworth	1,385	36.10

2010 Essa mayoral election
Mayoral Candidate	Vote	%
Terry Dowdall	3,063	67.41
David Guergis (X)	1,481	32.59
