= Collingwood, Ontario =

Collingwood
- Town (lower-tier)
- Town of Collingwood
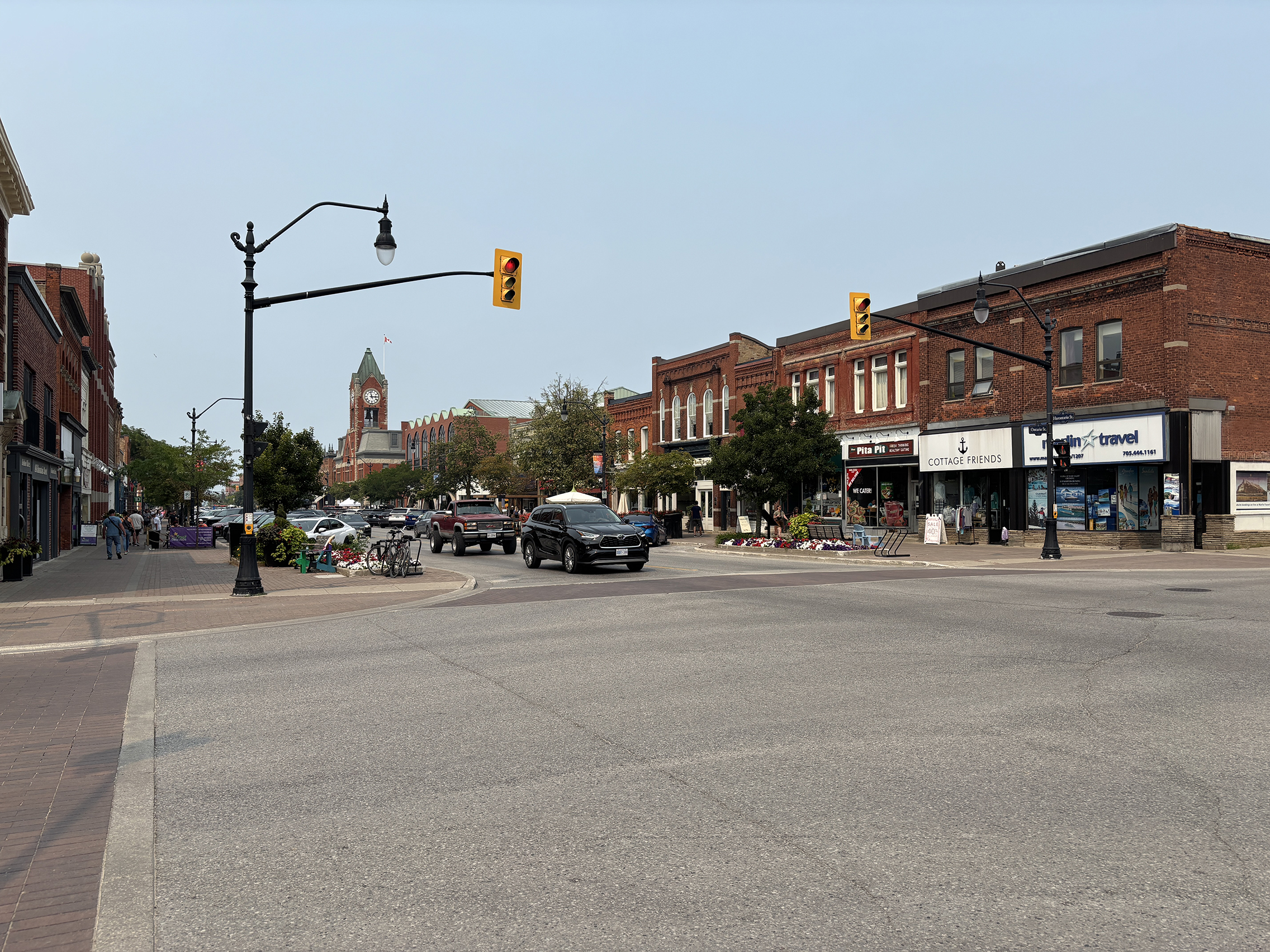
- Hurontario Street at Ontario Street in Downtown Collingwood (2025)

- Logo
- Nicknames: "C-wood", "The Wood"
- Location within Simcoe County Location within Southern Ontario
- Coordinates: 44°30′N 80°13′W
- Country: Canada
- Province: Ontario
- County: Simcoe
- Settled: 1840s
- Incorporated: 1858

Government
  - Mayor: Yvonne Hamlin
  - MPs: Terry Dowdall (C)
  - MPPs: Brian Saunderson (PC)

Area
  - Land: 33.15 km^{2} (12.80 sq mi)
  - Urban: 16.38 km^{2} (6.32 sq mi)

Population (2021)
  - Total: 24,811
  - Density: 748.3/km^{2} (1,938/sq mi)
  - Urban: 22,983
  - Urban density: 1,403.1/km^{2} (3,634/sq mi)
- Demonym: Collingwoodite
- Time zone: UTC-5 (Eastern (EST))
  - Summer (DST): UTC-4 (EDT)
- Postal code FSA: L9Y
- Area codes: 705, 249, 683
- Highways: Highway 26; Highway 24 (former)
- Website: www.collingwood.ca

Collingwood is a town in Simcoe County, Ontario, Canada. It is situated on Nottawasaga Bay at the southern point of Georgian Bay. Collingwood is well known as a tourist destination, for its skiing in the winter, and limestone caves along the Niagara Escarpment in the summer.

== History ==
The land in the area was first inhabited by the Iroquoian-speaking Petun nation, which built a string of villages in the vicinity of the nearby Niagara Escarpment. They were driven from the region by the Iroquois in 1650 who withdrew from the region around 1700. White settlers and freed Black slaves arrived in the area in the 1840s and brought with them their religion and culture.

Collingwood was incorporated as a town in 1858, nine years before Confederation, and was named after Admiral Cuthbert Collingwood, Lord Nelson's second in command at the Battle of Trafalgar, who assumed command of the British fleet after Nelson's death.

The area had several other names associated with it, including Hurontario (because it lies at the end of Hurontario Street, which runs from Lake Huron — of which Georgian Bay is a part — south to Lake Ontario), Nottawa, and Hens-and-Chickens Harbour (because of one large and four small islands in the bay).

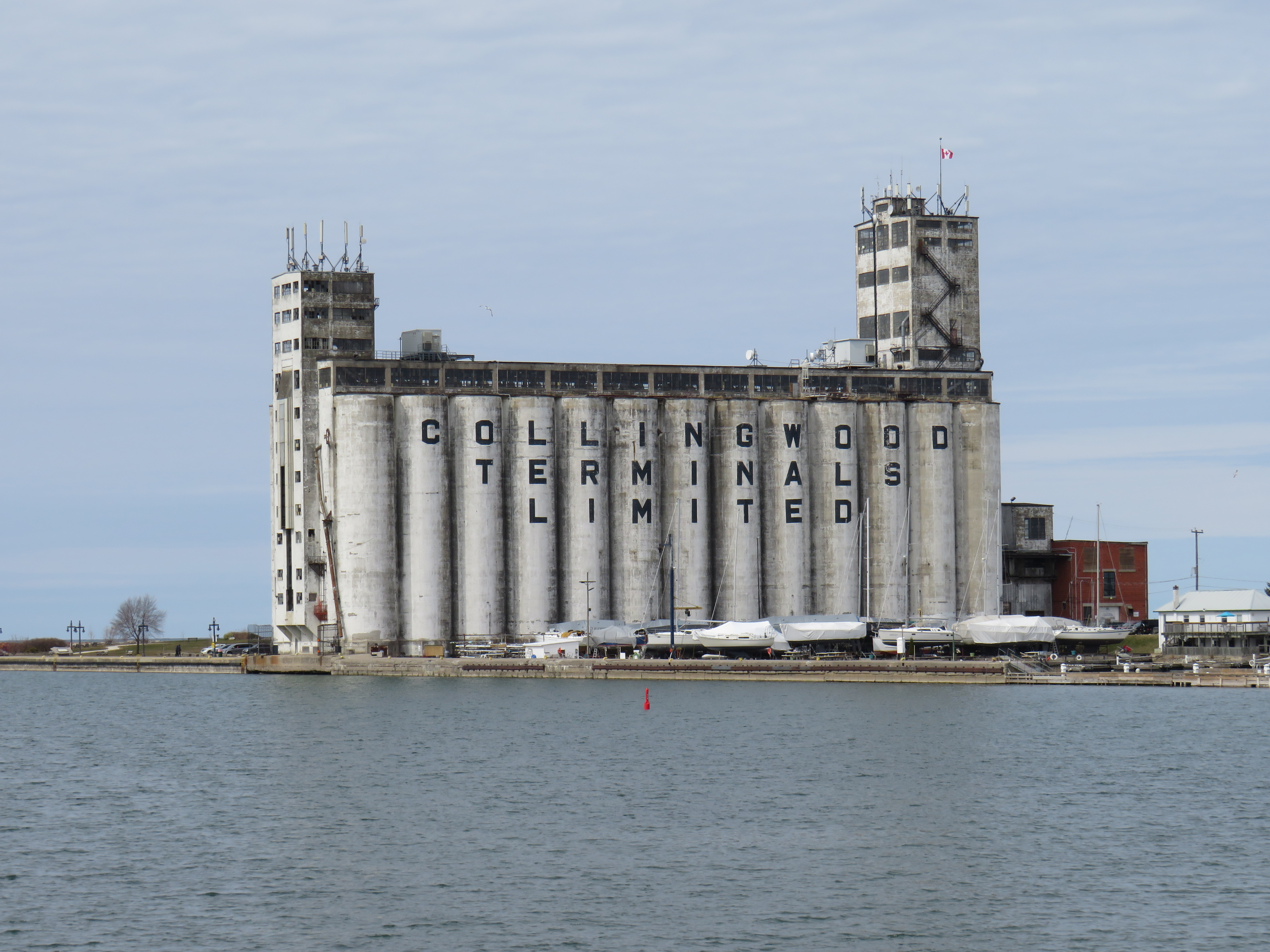
The Collingwood Terminals Limited grain elevator, which closed in 1993, still stands today at the entrance to the harbour

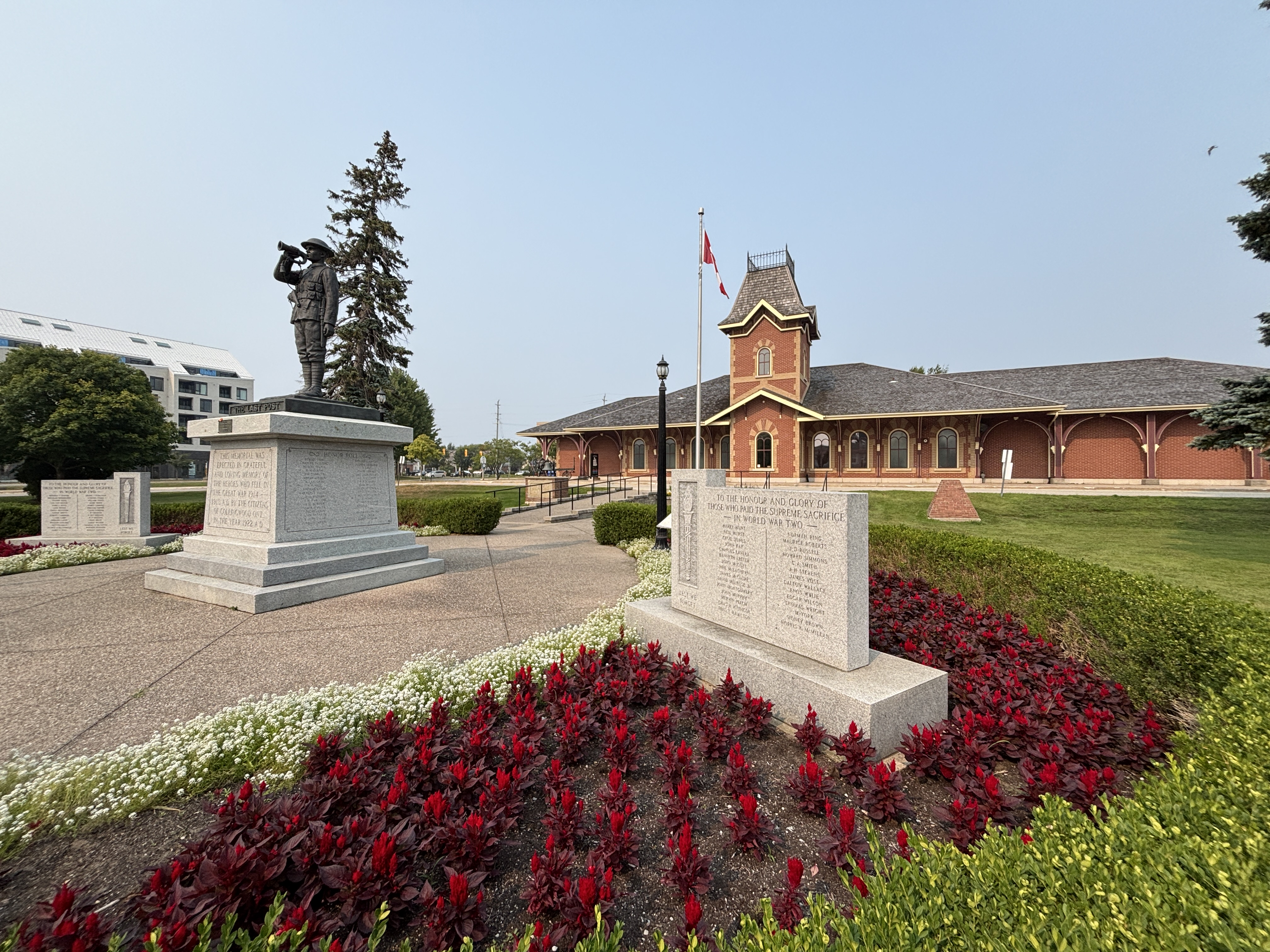
Collingwood Museum

In 1855, the Ontario, Simcoe & Huron (later called the Northern) Railway came into Collingwood, and the harbour became the shipment point for goods destined for the upper Great Lakes ports of Chicago and Port Arthur-Fort William (now Thunder Bay). Grain was one of the primary products by tonnage shipped, and a large grain elevator; Collingwood Terminals Limited; was built on the waterfront for transshipment of grain from trains and later trucks to lake freighters in 1929, and operated for 64 years until 1993. It still stands today.

Shipping produced a need for ship repairs and so it was not long before an organized shipbuilding business was created. On May 24, 1883, the Collingwood Shipyards, formally known as Collingwood Dry Dock Shipbuilding and Foundry Company Limited, opened with a special ceremony. On September 12, 1901, the Huronic, the first steel-hulled ship in Canada, was launched in Collingwood. The shipyards produced lake freighters and during World War II contributed to the production of corvettes for the Royal Canadian Navy. Shipbuilding was one of the principal industries in the town, employing as much as 10% of the total labour force. However, overseas competition and overcapacity in shipbuilding in Canada led to the demise of shipbuilding in Collingwood in September 1986.

The creation of government incentive programs and a fully-serviced industrial park made it possible for Collingwood to attract eleven new manufacturing firms to the town by 1971. Eight additional manufacturing companies had located in the town by 1983, which made Collingwood the largest industrial employer in the region.

== Geography ==
=== Climate ===
The climate of Collingwood is humid continental. The town is located in the snow belt region and receives modest amounts of both snow and rain through the year.

In the spring months there is a gradual warming due to the proximity of Georgian Bay. Frequent shower pass over the region this time of year and later on in the season can turn into severe storms. Temperatures this time of year range from −5 to 22 °C (23 to 72 °F).

In the summer months, there are warm to hot humid conditions with frequent lake breezes to cool things off. Thunderstorms are regular occurrences in the summer and can sometimes be severe enough to cause tornadoes. Temperatures at this time of year can range from 11 to 26 °C (52 to 79 °F). The humidity will often make it feel much hotter than the actual temperature and can even make it feel like the mid-40s (110s °F.).

Fall generally arrives later than the rest of Canada because of the warm waters of Georgian Bay. Strong storms, called November witches, can bring multiple days of strong winds with rain and snow. Lake effect snow also starts this time of year. Temperatures typically range from −10 to 20 °C (14 to 68 °F).

Winter is a very cloudy and cool wet time of year, with frequent wind and frosts. Sometimes, winter thaws occur, and the town may go multiple days above the freezing mark, which melts much of the snow. That usually happens when a strong storm is approaching from the west. Lake effect snow lasts for most of the winter and causes huge amounts of snow to fall in the region. Temperatures at this time of year typically range from −20 to 5 °C (−4 to 41 °F).

Climate data for Collingwood (1991–2020 normals, extremes 1994–2020)
Month	Jan	Feb	Mar	Apr	May	Jun	Jul	Aug	Sep	Oct	Nov	Dec	Year
Record high °C (°F)	15.8 (60.4)	18.3 (64.9)	27.0 (80.6)	31.0 (87.8)	34.1 (93.4)	34.4 (93.9)	35.7 (96.3)	36.5 (97.7)	34.0 (93.2)	30.7 (87.3)	26.0 (78.8)	19.1 (66.4)	36.5 (97.7)
Mean daily maximum °C (°F)	−1.3 (29.7)	−0.6 (30.9)	3.7 (38.7)	10.1 (50.2)	17.2 (63.0)	22.4 (72.3)	25.3 (77.5)	24.9 (76.8)	21.4 (70.5)	14.3 (57.7)	7.6 (45.7)	1.6 (34.9)	12.2 (54.0)
Daily mean °C (°F)	−5 (23)	−4.5 (23.9)	−0.3 (31.5)	5.6 (42.1)	12.2 (54.0)	17.6 (63.7)	20.8 (69.4)	20.3 (68.5)	16.7 (62.1)	10.3 (50.5)	4.2 (39.6)	−1.6 (29.1)	8.0 (46.4)
Mean daily minimum °C (°F)	−8.7 (16.3)	−8.4 (16.9)	−4.4 (24.1)	1.2 (34.2)	7.2 (45.0)	12.7 (54.9)	16.2 (61.2)	15.7 (60.3)	12.0 (53.6)	6.3 (43.3)	0.8 (33.4)	−4.7 (23.5)	3.8 (38.8)
Record low °C (°F)	−28 (−18)	−29.1 (−20.4)	−26.7 (−16.1)	−11.2 (11.8)	−2.3 (27.9)	2.6 (36.7)	7.8 (46.0)	7.6 (45.7)	1.2 (34.2)	−3.4 (25.9)	−17.2 (1.0)	−26.9 (−16.4)	−29.1 (−20.4)
Source: Environment Canada

=== Neighbourhoods ===
==== Collingwood Heritage Conservation District ====
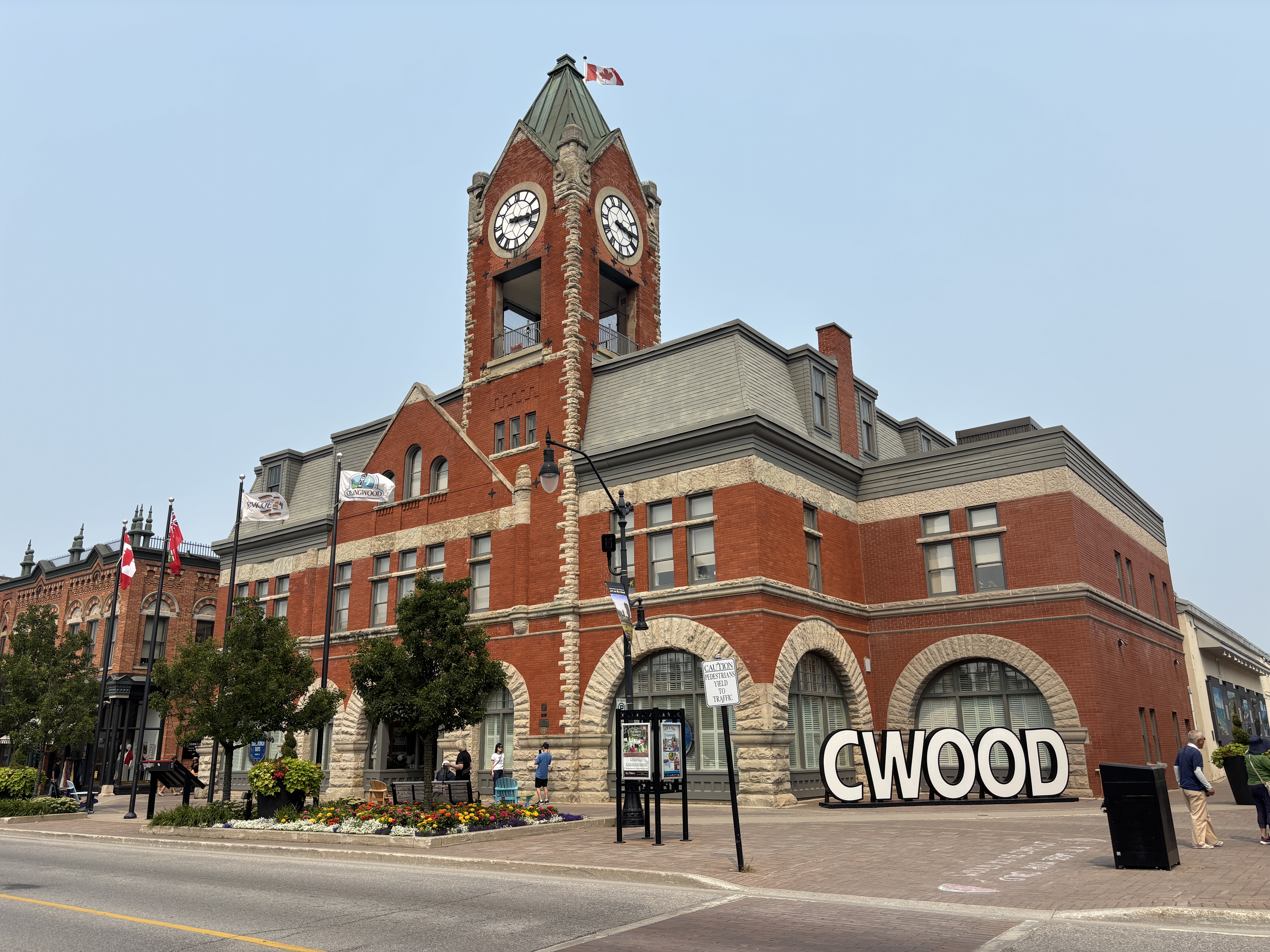
Collingwood Town Hall

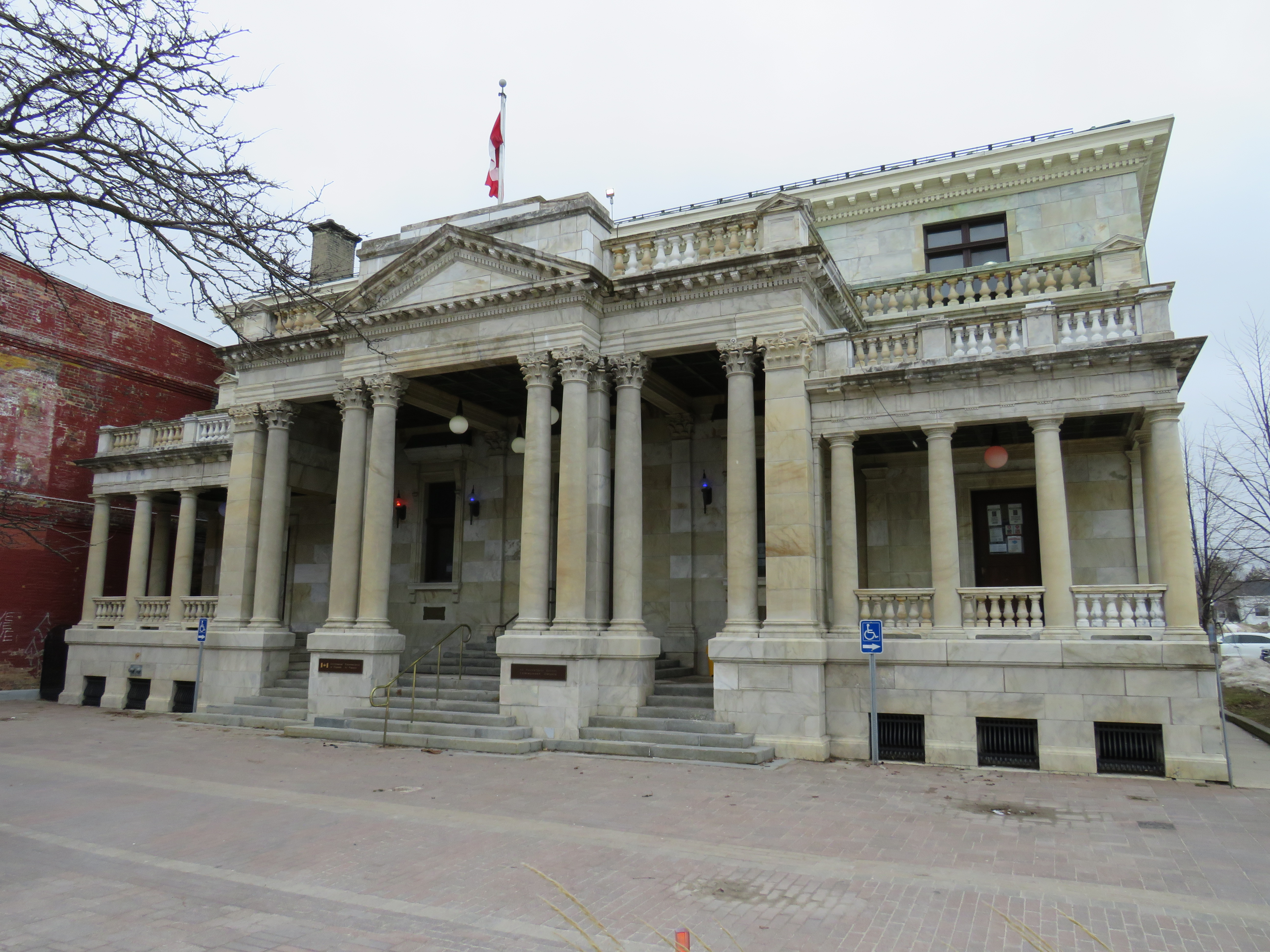
Federal Building

The Collingwood Heritage Conservation District was formally recognized in the Canadian Register of Historic Places on 2002-12-02. Collingwood was the first municipality in Canada to have a Heritage Conservation District added to the register.

The area, which surrounds the town's downtown core contains 260 properties and several landmarks, including the Shipyards redevelopment on former site of Collingwood Shipbuilding, Collingwood Terminals grain elevator, and the town hall.

==== Creative Simcoe Street ====
The portion of Simcoe Street that lies within the Collingwood Heritage Conservation District is informally known as Creative Simcoe Street. The neighbourhood is home to several artist's studios, art galleries and restaurants. It also includes the Collingwood Museum and Collingwood Public Library, the historic Tremont House building, as well as the Simcoe Street Theatre, which is managed by the Town of Collingwood Department of Parks, Recreation, and Culture.

The two-block stretch of Simcoe Street intersects the main street, Hurontario Street, to the West, connecting the neighbourhood to the Collingwood downtown. It ends at St. Paul Street to the East, at the Eastern border of the Heritage Conservation District.

The Creative Simcoe Street name is used by local media, businesses and tourism groups however, the neighbourhood is not formally recognized by the Town.

== Demographics ==
In the 2021 Census of Population conducted by Statistics Canada, Collingwood had a population of 24,811 living in 11,174 of its 13,216 total private dwellings, a change of 13.8% from its 2016 population of 21,793. With a land area of 33.15 km^{2} (12.80 sq mi), it had a population density of 748.4/km^{2} (1,938.5/sq mi) in 2021.

Canada census – Collingwood community profile

	2021	2016	2011
Population	24,811 (+13.8% from 2016)	21,973 (+13.3% from 2011)	19,241 (+11.3% from 2006)
Land area	33.15 km^{2} (12.80 sq mi)	33.78 km^{2} (13.04 sq mi)	33.46 km^{2} (12.92 sq mi)
Population density	748.3/km^{2} (1,938/sq mi)	645.1/km^{2} (1,671/sq mi)	575.1/km^{2} (1,490/sq mi)
Median age	50.8 (M: 48.0, F: 53.6)	49.2 (M: 46.6, F: 51.3)
Private dwellings	13,216 (total) 11,174 (occupied)	11,617 (total)	10,695 (total)
Median household income	$82,000	$64,369

References: 2021 2016 2011

Historical census populations - Collingwood

Year	Pop.	±%
1871	2,829	—
1881	4,445	+57.1%
1891	4,939	+11.1%
1901	5,755	+16.5%
1911	7,090	+23.2%
1921	5,882	−17.0%
1931	5,809	−1.2%

Year	Pop.	±%
1941	6,249	+7.6%
1951	7,413	+18.6%
1961	8,385	+13.1%
1971	9,775	+16.6%
1981	12,064	+23.4%
1991	13,505	+11.9%
1996	15,596	+15.5%

Year	Pop.	±%
2001	16,039	+2.8%
2006	17,503	+9.1%
2011	19,241	+9.9%
2016	21,793	+13.3%
2021	24,811	+13.8%

2006 Population figure based on revised count.
Source: Statistics Canada

== Economy ==
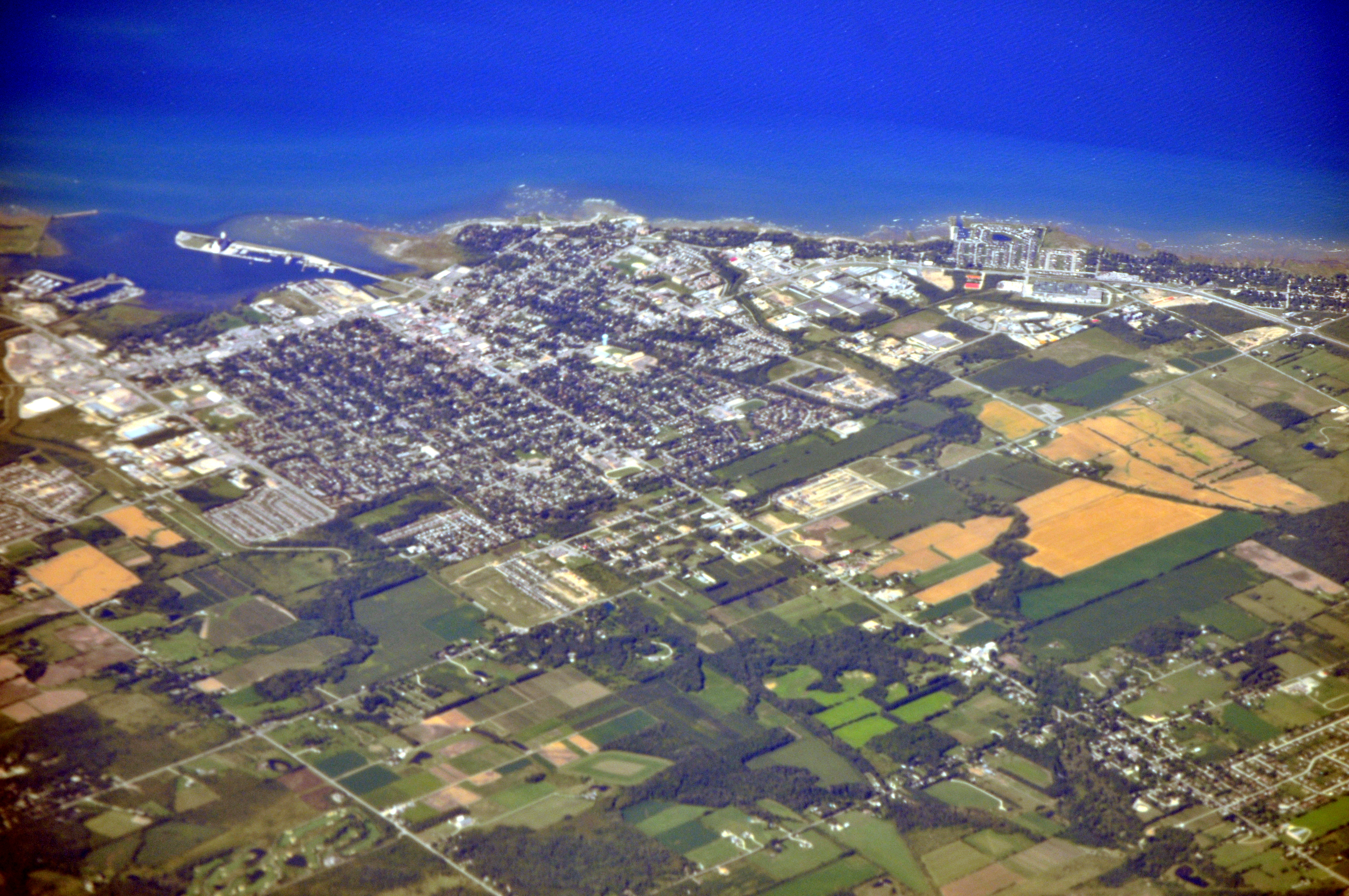
Aerial view of Collingwood from the southwest (2013)

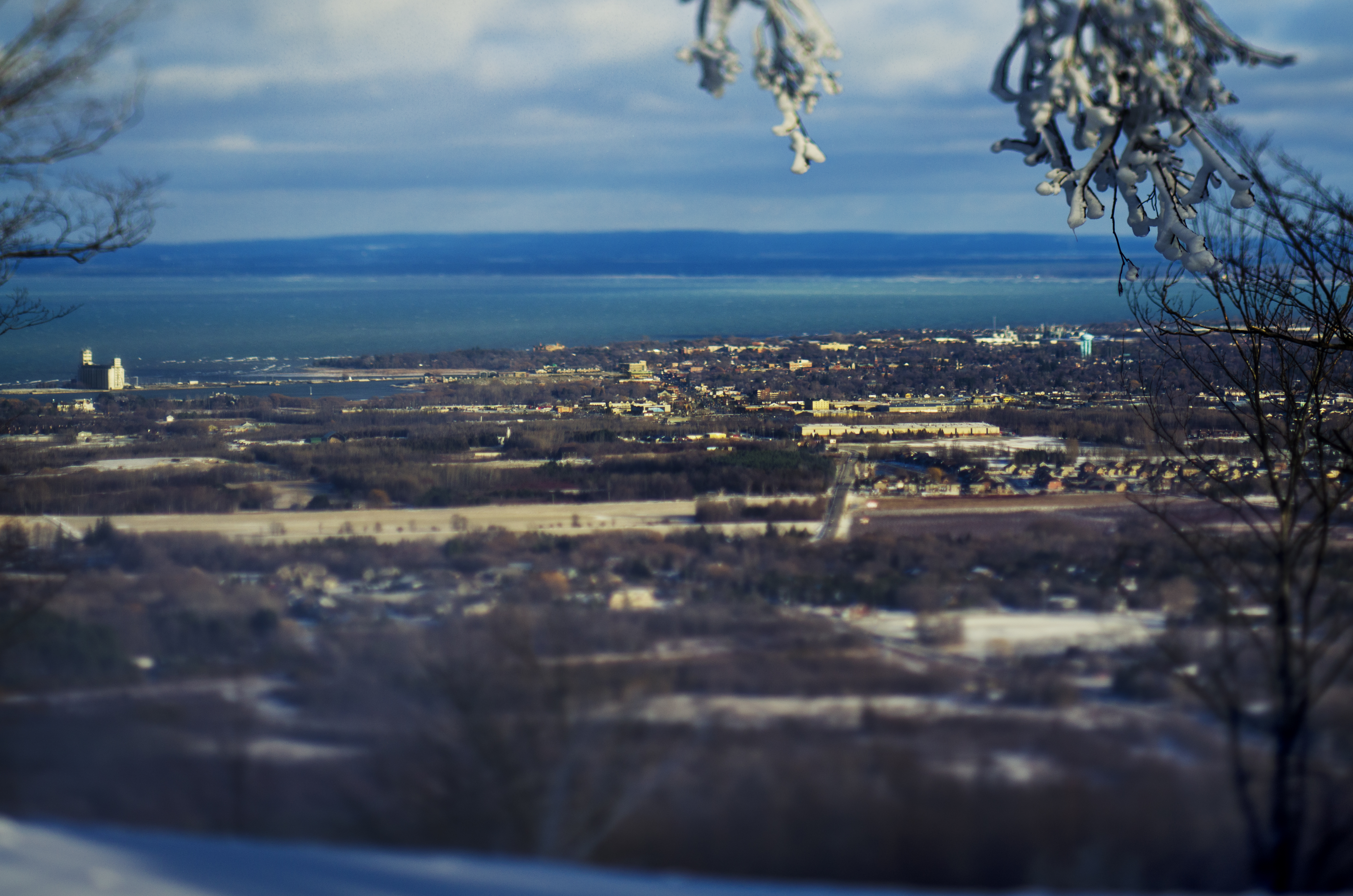
View of Collingwood, Ontario from the top of Blue Mountain Resort

Collingwood's industrial base, which includes Pilkington Glass of Canada, Goodall Rubber Company - Canada ULC, and VOAC Inc, and which are among the community's largest employers, has begun to erode.

Several industries in the area have closed, including Collingwood Ethanol L.P., Nacan Products (2004), Backyard Products (2004), Kaufman of Collingwood (2006 - land still vacant), Goodyear Tires (2007 - plant built in 1967 was demolished after 2019 and now vacant), Alcoa Wheel products (2008 - building now home to Barber Glass plant) and the Blue Mountain Pottery (2004). Collingwood is also home to the distillery where Canadian Mist Whisky is produced.

In June 2007, Collingwood Ethanol (now Amaizeingly Green) began production in the former Nacan facility. The company expected to produce 50 million litres of ethanol annually to satisfy regulatory requirements on ethanol content in gasoline mandated by the provincial and federal governments. Collingwood Ethanol also produces byproducts of the ethanol manufacturing process, including an organic corn gluten fertilizer. Petitions have been submitted to the town by residents of a new housing development located across the road in an effort to force Collingwood Ethanol to reduce the amount of odour and noise that they are causing during the times when they are in full production. Before Collingwood Ethanol started production, however, Nacan (a starch plant that once occupied the now ethanol plant) also created a strong odour and noise. This made many locals wonder why a housing development would be built across the road from an industrial part of town. In December 2012, Amaizeingly Green filed for receivership of the plant. Due to the higher cost of corn, the plant has since been closed. Demolition of the plant started December 2018.

Located on the southern shores of Georgian Bay and close to Blue Mountain, a promontory of the Niagara Escarpment, the town is a major recreation area for the southern part of the province. Blue Mountain itself is noted for skiing, and also for its Scenic Caves. The town is also a short distance from Wasaga Beach Provincial Park, a destination that received the title of Biosphere Reserve in 2004.

Local media include the CollingwoodToday.ca News site and Collingwood-Wasaga Connection community newspapers, and radio station CKCB-FM. The Barrie-based regional television station CKVR-TV maintains a bureau in Collingwood, and the Owen Sound-based Bayshore Broadcasting radio group also has an office in Collingwood. The Collingwood annual week-end Elvis Presley festival attracted Elvis impersonators from the world over for 25 years; as of 2020, however, municipal support has been discontinued.

== Government ==
The mayor is Yvonne Hamlin, who was elected in October 2022.

Collingwood is within the Simcoe—Grey riding for both federal and provincial elections. The federal Member of Parliament is Conservative Terry Dowdall, and the Member of Provincial Parliament is Brian Saunderson who sits as a Conservative.

Collingwood federal election results
Year	Liberal		Conservative		New Democratic		Green	
2021	36%	4,682	39%	5,000	14%	1,846	6%	727
2019	41%	5,307	32%	4,091	10%	1,351	15%	1,955

Collingwood provincial election results
Year	PC		New Democratic		Liberal		Green	
2022	43%	4,207	11%	1,080	29%	2,828	11%	1,076
2018	45%	4,502	26%	2,581	20%	2,017	7%	741

== Recreation ==
Skiers at a lodge in Collingwood, 1959

Collingwood is a destination for winter and summer recreational activities such as swimming, hiking, biking, snowshoeing, cross-country skiing, snowboarding, and downhill skiing. Both private and public organizations are available to the public. There is a network of trails that allow this, including the Georgian Trail which connects to the Bruce Trail.

The first hockey rink in Collingwood was located on the west side of Pine Street in 1883, with public skates every Tuesday night. Interest in hockey peaked in the 1890s with the first recognized hockey game played in 1894 against a team from Barrie. Collingwood joined Barrie and Bradford in a Simcoe County league in 1894 and was granted a team in the newly formed Ontario Hockey Association in 1895.

The Park Street Arena, now known as the Collingwood Curling Club, was built in 1909. The arena now known as Eddie Bush Memorial was built in 1948. Collingwood has hosted training sessions with Team Canada, the Toronto Maple Leafs and Montreal Canadiens.

== Transportation ==
Collingwood is served by Highway 26, which runs along the shore of Nottawasaga Bay, and county road 124 (which was part of Highway 24 before the provincial government downgraded that portion of the highway in 1998). The town is also served by a rail trail along the former Barrie Collingwood Railway section of what had been the Ontario, Simcoe and Huron Union Railway, connecting Collingwood to the towns of Owen Sound and Barrie, with a spur heading north through the town's central business district, to the large grain elevators at the downtown wharf, where trains would load and unload onto ships.

Colltrans is the Town of Collingwood's local public transit system. Simcoe County LINX, the region's inter-community transit service, serves stops at downtown Collingwood, the Collingwood Hospital, and Collingwood Collegiate Institute, connecting the town to cities like Barrie, where it is possible to connect to inter-regional services such as GO Transit and Ontario Northland.

In addition to Collingwood's position as a lake port, it is also served by Collingwood Airport (CNY3), a medium-sized airport about 4 miles (6.4 km) south of the town.

== Notable people ==
=== Athletes ===
==== NHL ====
- Jason Arnott, forward
- Claire Alexander, defenceman
- Bernie Brophy, forward
- Roy Burmister, forward
- Eddie Bush, defenceman and coach
- Kevin Colley, forward
- Jimmy Herbert, player
- Ed Kea, player
- Lindsay Middlebrook, goaltender
- Reg Noble, forward
- Randy Osburn, forward
- Jack Portland, defenceman
- Paul Shakes, defenceman
- Darryl Sly, defenceman
- Scott Thornton, forward

==== Olympians ====
- Michaela Gosselin, para alpine skier
- Megan Lane, equestrian
- Herbert McDonald, cyclist
- Sue Palmer-Komar, cyclist
- Roni Remme, alpine ski racer
- Robert H. Storey, bobsleigh
- Brian Saunderson, former Olympic rower

==== Other ====
- Amanda Sin, Pan Am Games bronze medallist in mountain biking
- Zach Stone, snowboarder
- Burke Dales, CFL punter
- Stacey Dales, WNBA player and NFL Network reporter
- Morey Doner, soccer player

=== Miscellaneous ===
- Andrea Canning, Dateline NBC host
- Jesse Thomas Cook, filmmaker
- Edna Jaques (1891–1978), poet
- Norah M. Holland (1876–1925), writer
- Michael Wayne McGray, serial killer

== Sister cities ==
- Boone, North Carolina, United States
- Zihuatanejo, Mexico
- Katano, Japan

== See also ==
- List of towns in Ontario
- List of population centres in Ontario
