= 2015 Progressive Conservative Party of Ontario leadership election =

Canadian political party leadership election

- May 9, 2015
- Turnout: 49.3%
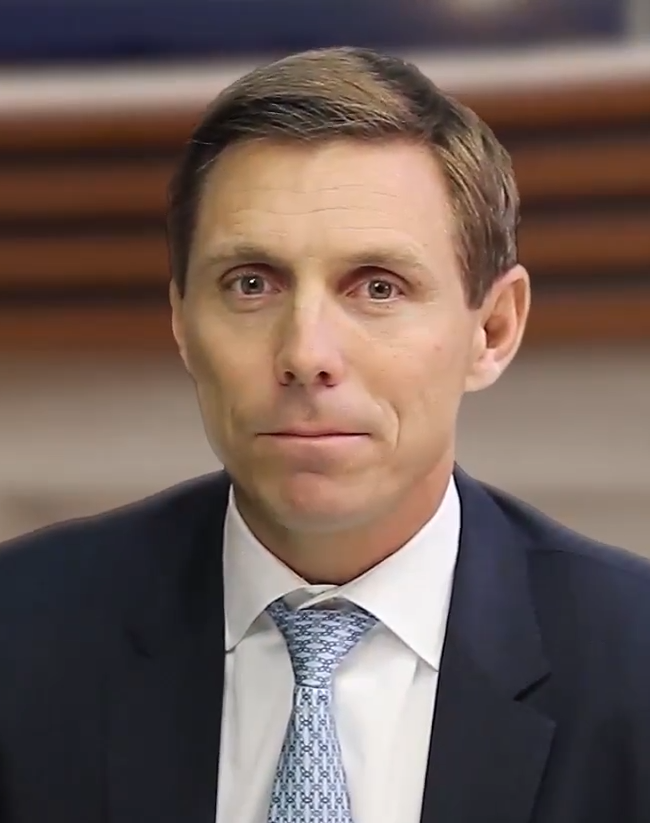

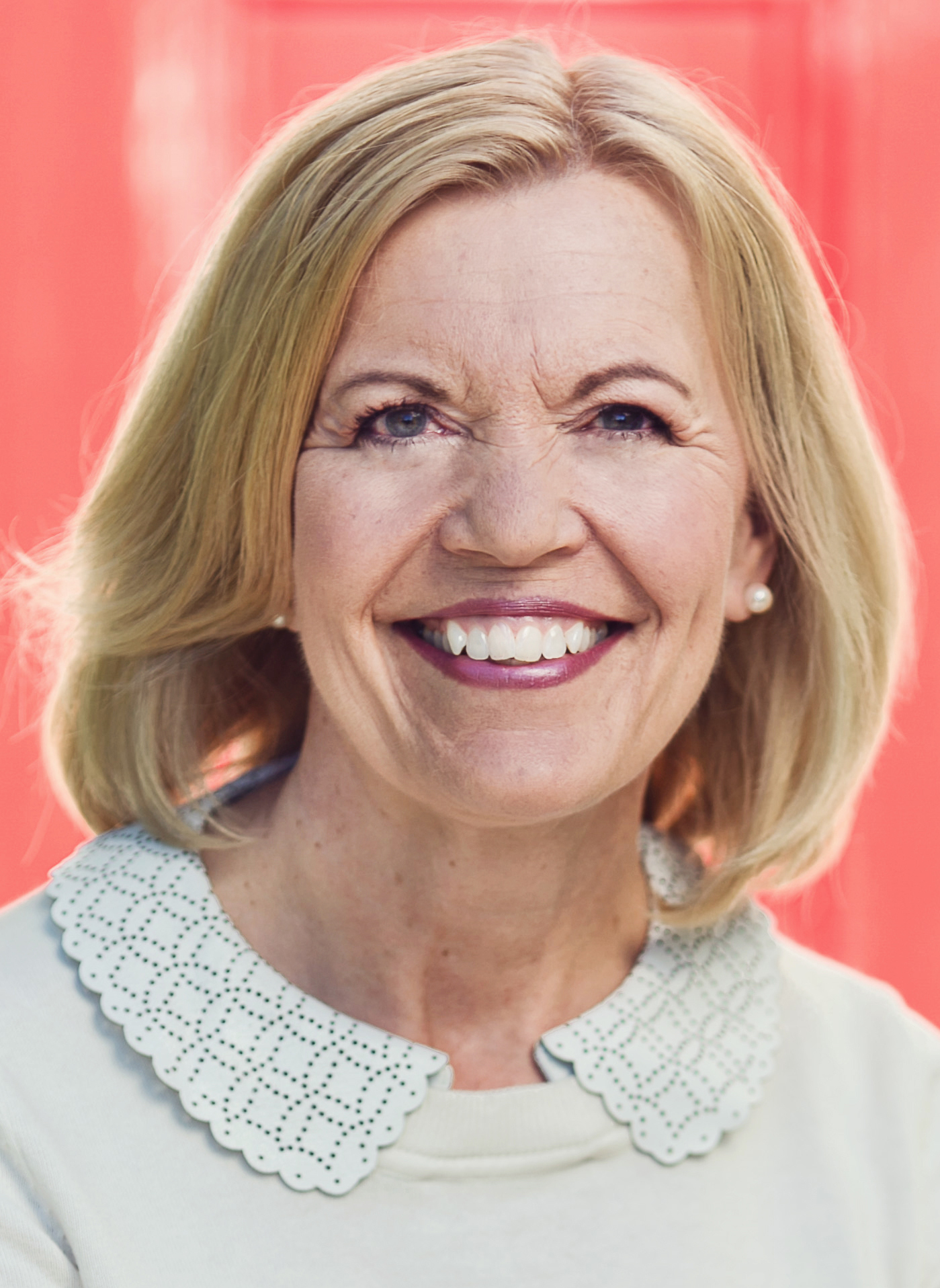
Candidate	Patrick Brown	Christine Elliott
Points	6,543 (61.83%)	4,040 (38.17%)
- Results by Ontario electoral district
Leader before election
Jim Wilson (interim)
Elected Leader
Patrick Brown

2015 Progressive Conservative Party of Ontario leadership election
- Date: May 9, 2015
- Convention: Toronto Congress Centre
- Resigning leader: Tim Hudak
- Won by: Patrick Brown
- Ballots: 1
- Candidates: 2
- Entrance fee: $75,000 fee + $25,000 deposit
- Spending limit: $1.25 million

The 2015 Progressive Conservative Party of Ontario leadership election was held on May 9, 2015, as a result of the resignation of Ontario Progressive Conservative leader Tim Hudak following the provincial election on June 12, 2014, his second loss in a row as party leader. Patrick Brown won the leadership with 61.8% of votes allocated, defeating Christine Elliott who had 38.2%.

== Rules and procedure ==
The party's 76,587 members were eligible to cast votes by preferential ballot. The vote will be weighted so that each of the province's 107 ridings that has more than 100 votes cast are allocated 100 electoral votes; ridings in which fewer than 100 party members vote will not be weighted, but will instead have the votes counted as individual votes. If at least 100 members votes in each riding the number of electoral college votes needed to win will be 5,351. The registration fee was $75,000 plus a refundable deposit of $25,000 and the spending limit was $1.25 million. 20% of money raised by candidates after the first $100,000 will be transferred to the PC Ontario Fund. The lowest ranked candidate will be dropped from the next round as ballots are counted, and the first candidate to get 50 per cent of the votes will be declared the new leader.

== Timeline ==
- June 12, 2014: General election results in the incumbent Liberals, led by Kathleen Wynne, being re-elected with a majority government and the Progressive Conservatives losing 9 seats. Party leader Tim Hudak announces his intention to resign as leader following the selection of his successor.
- June 16, 2014: Progressive Conservative caucus meets with a majority of MPPs asking Hudak to resign immediately.
- June 18, 2014: Hudak announces to the Progressive Conservative caucus that he will resign effective July 2, 2014.
- June 25, 2014: Christine Elliott announces her bid for the leadership of the Ontario PC Party.
- July 2, 2014: Ontario legislature convenes; Hudak's resignation will take effect; Progressive Conservative caucus chooses Jim Wilson as interim leader.
- July 5, 2014: The Progressive Conservative executive met to discuss the leadership and appointed a committee to consult the party membership and then draft recommendations for leadership campaign rules and propose a date for the election.
- Early August 2014: Party committee reports back to the executive with its proposals.
- August 9, 2014: Party executive announces that the leadership election will occur no earlier than April 1, 2015 and no later than May 31, 2015. The planning committee is given an additional six weeks to consult with party members on the rules of the election.
- September 17, 2014: Monte McNaughton declares his candidacy.
- September 21, 2014: Planning committee reports back to executive.
- September 24, 2014: Vic Fedeli declares his candidacy.
- September 28, 2014: Patrick Brown declares his candidacy.
- October 6, 2014: Lisa MacLeod declares her candidacy.
- November 8, 2014: Official campaign period begins.
- November 24, 2014: All-candidates debate in Sudbury.
- January 26, 2015: All-candidates debate in London.
- January 30, 2015 at 12 pm: Deadline for candidates to file nomination papers and pay first installment of $75,000 registration fee and $25,000 deposit.
- February 4, 2015: Fedeli withdraws from contest.
- February 6, 2015: MacLeod withdraws; final non-refundable $50,000 installment of candidate entry fee is due.
- February 11, 2015: All-candidates debate in Ottawa.
- February 28, 2015: Date by which one must become a member of the party and be eligible to vote in the leadership election.
- April 9, 2015: McNaughton withdraws; endorses Brown.
- May 1, 2015: Televised debate on TVO in Toronto
- May 3 & 7, 2015: Members cast preferential ballot for leader.
- May 8–9, 2015: Ballots counted.
- May 9, 2015: Results announced, riding by riding, between 10 am and noon at the Toronto Congress Centre.

== Interim leadership ==
The following MPPs stood in the July 2, 2014, election by caucus to be interim leader of the party until the leadership election for a permanent leader is held:

- Randy Hillier (Lanark—Frontenac—Lennox and Addington), MPP since 2007, variously Opposition Critic for Labour, Municipal Affairs and Housing, Rural Affairs, and Northern Development, Mines and Forestry.
- Jim Wilson (Simcoe—Grey), MPP since 1990, Opposition House Leader (2011–2014), previously Minister of Health (1995–1997), Minister of Energy, Science & Technology (1997–2002), Minister of Northern Development and Mines (2002–2003), Minister of Environment (2003).
- John Yakabuski (Renfrew—Nipissing—Pembroke), MPP since 2003, has served as Chief Opposition Whip (2011–2014), Opposition House Leader (2010–2011) and variously Opposition Critic for Community Safety and Energy.

Jim Wilson was elected by caucus to be interim leader and also assumed the position of Leader of the Opposition. Vote totals were not released.

== Declared candidates ==
=== Patrick Brown ===
Background

Federal Conservative Party MP for Barrie (2006–2015), Barrie City Councillor (2000–2006), President of the Progressive Conservative Youth Federation (PCYF) (1998–2002). Former vice-president of the Progressive Conservative Party of Ontario. Lawyer by profession.

Date candidacy declared: September 28, 2014
Supporters

- MPPs: (5) Rick Nicholls (Chatham-Kent—Essex), Jack MacLaren (Carleton—Mississippi Mills), Toby Barrett (Haldimand—Norfolk), Bob Bailey (Sarnia—Lambton), Monte McNaughton (Lambton—Kent—Middlesex; former leadership candidate)
- MPs: (18) Gord Brown (Leeds—Grenville), Paul Calandra (Oak Ridges—Markham), Rick Dykstra (St. Catharines), Dave Mackenzie (Oxford), Phil McColeman (Brant), Brad Butt (Mississauga—Streetsville), Chungsen Leung (Willowdale), Tim Uppal (Edmonton—Spruce Grove, AB), Bal Gosal (Bramalea—Gore—Malton), Parm Gill (Brampton—Springdale), Kyle Seeback (Brampton West), Costas Menegakis (Richmond Hill), Mark Adler (York Centre), Wladyslaw Lizon (Mississauga East—Cooksville), Joe Daniel (Don Valley East), Pierre Lemieux (Glengarry—Prescott—Russell), Royal Galipeau (Ottawa—Orléans), Dean Allison (Niagara West—Glanbrook)
- Senators: (6) Don Meredith (Ontario), Lynn Beyak (Ontario), Salma Ataullahjan (Ontario), Thanh Hai Ngo (Ontario), Tobias Enverga (Ontario), Victor Oh (Ontario)
- Municipal politicians: (6) Sandie Bellow (St. Catherines City Councillor for Ward 5), Scott McPherson (Oro-Medonte City Councillor for Ward 2), Denzil Minnan-Wong (Toronto City Councillor for Ward 34; Deputy Mayor of Toronto), Sergio Morales (Barrie City Councillor for Ward 9), Ross Romano (Sault Ste. Marie City Councillor for Ward 6), Mat Siscoe (St. Catherines City Councillor for Ward 4)
- Former MPPs: (4) Steve Gilchrist (Scarborough East, 1995–2003), Jane McKenna (Burlington, 2011–2014), John Hastings (Etobicoke North, 1995–2003), Dave Boushy (Sarnia, 1995–1999)
- Former MPs:
- Former Senators: (4) Consiglio Di Nino (Ontario), Vim Kochhar (Ontario), Hugh Segal (Ontario), Asha Seth (Ontario)
- Former municipal politicians: (2) Joe DiPaola (Richmond Hill City Councillor for Ward 6, 1998–2006), Alex Nuttall (Barrie City Councillor for Ward 10, 2006–2014)
- Former candidates: (6) Jeff Bennett (London West, 2014), Andrew Ffrench (York South—Weston, 2014), Kevin Gaudet (Pickering—Scarborough East, 2014), Nita Kang (Scarborough Southwest, 2014), Derek Parks (Thunder Bay—Superior North, 2014), Roxanne Villeneuve (Glengarry—Prescott—Russell, 2014)
- Other prominent individuals: (16) Derek Burney (Canadian Ambassador to the United States, 1989–1993), Stuart Clark (Ontario PC Campus Association President, 2013–2014), Troy Crowder (NHL Player), Mike Gartner (NHL Player), Zack Goldford (Ontario PC Youth Association President), Wayne Gretzky (NHL Player), Dale Hawerchuk (NHL Player), Darma Jain (Indo-Canada Chamber of Commerce President), Kris King (NHL Player), Gary Leeman (NHL Player), Narendra Modi (Prime Minister of India), Alanna Newman (Ontario PC Youth Association President, 2013–2014), Laj Prasher (Canada India Foundation President), Mark Towhey (Chief of Staff to the Mayor of Toronto, 2011–2013), Devon White (MLB Player), Ken Zeise (Ontario PC Party President, 2008–2012)
- Organizations:
- Media: (1) Paul Godfrey (CEO of Postmedia)
- Policies:

=== Christine Elliott ===
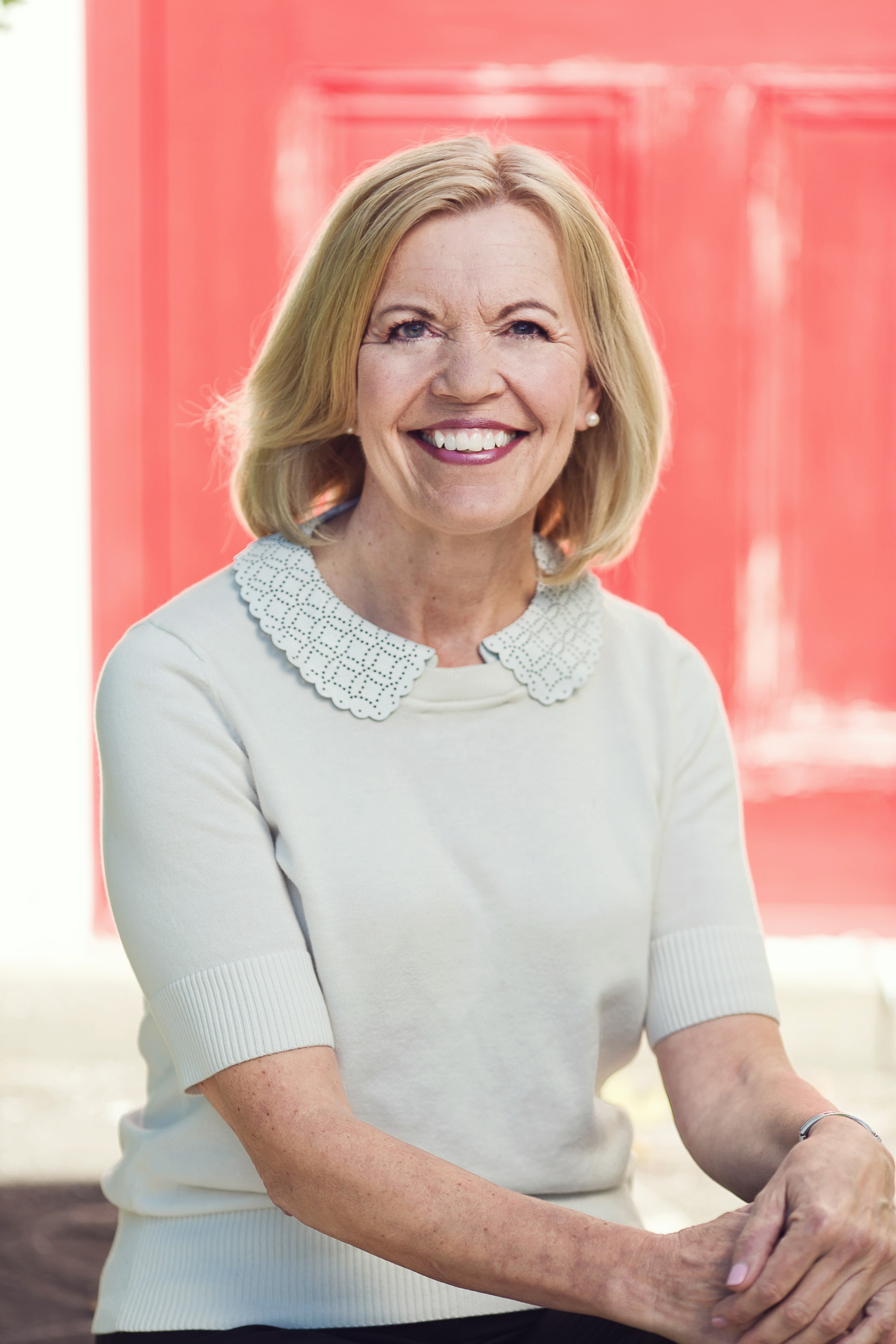
Christine Elliott

Background

MPP since 2006 (Whitby—Ajax (2006–2007), Whitby—Oshawa (2007–2015). Deputy Leader of the Opposition and Critic for Health and Long-Term Care since 2009. Ran in the 2009 leadership election, placing third. Widow of former federal Minister of Finance Jim Flaherty. Prior to entering politics, Elliott was a lawyer who practiced corporate, estate and real estate law.

Date candidacy declared: June 25, 2014
Supporters

- MPPs: (17) Ted Arnott (Wellington—Halton Hills), Todd Smith (Prince Edward—Hastings), Michael Harris (Kitchener—Conestoga), Norm Miller (Parry Sound—Muskoka), Jeff Yurek (Elgin—Middlesex—London), Sylvia Jones (Dufferin—Caledon), Laurie Scott (Haliburton—Kawartha Lakes—Brock), Bill Walker (Bruce—Grey—Owen Sound), Lisa Thompson (Huron—Bruce), Gila Martow (Thornhill), Ernie Hardeman (Oxford), Vic Fedeli (Nipissing; former leadership candidate), Randy Pettapiece (Perth—Wellington), Lisa MacLeod (Nepean—Carleton; former leadership candidate), Steve Clark (Leeds—Grenville), Julia Munro (York—Simcoe), Jim McDonell (Stormont—Dundas—South Glengarry)
- MPs: (25) Chris Alexander (Ajax—Pickering), Bruce Stanton (Simcoe North), Mike Wallace (Burlington), Peter Kent (Thornhill), Erin O'Toole (Durham), Ed Holder (London West), Michael Chong (Wellington—Halton Hills), Rob Nicholson (Niagara Falls), Kellie Leitch (Simcoe—Grey), Chungsen Leung (Willowdale), Costas Menegakis (Richmond Hill), Peter Braid (Kitchener—Waterloo), Daryl Kramp (Prince Edward—Hastings), Rick Norlock (Northumberland—Quinte West), Ted Opitz (Etobicoke Centre), Joe Preston (Elgin—Middlesex—London), Bernard Trottier (Etobicoke—Lakeshore), Dave Van Kesteren (Chatham-Kent—Essex), Terence Young (Oakville), Pat Perkins (Whitby—Oshawa), David Sweet (Ancaster—Dundas—Flamborough—Westdale), John Baird (Ottawa West—Nepean), John Carmichael (Don Valley West), Lisa Raitt (Halton), Jay Aspin (Nipissing—Timiskaming)
- Senators: (3) Nicole Eaton (Ontario), Linda Frum (Ontario), Marjory LeBreton (Ontario)
- Municipal politicians: (2) Don Mitchell (Mayor of Whitby), Rob Ford (Toronto City Councillor for Ward 2; Mayor of Toronto, 2010–2014)
- Former MPPs: (12) Bill Davis (Premier of Ontario, 1971–1985; MPP 1959–1985), Peter Shurman (Thornhill, 2007–2013), Jerry Ouellette (Oshawa, 1995–2014), Bart Maves (Niagara Falls, 1995–2003), Wayne Wettlaufer (Kitchener Centre, 1995–2003), John O'Toole (Durham, 1995–2014), Barb Fisher (Bruce, 1995–1999), Phil Gillies (Brantford, 1981–1987), Brad Clark (Stoney Creek, 1999–2003), Joyce Savoline (Burlington, 2007–2011), Andy Brandt (Sarnia, 1981–1990; former interim leader), Doug Holyday (Etobicoke—Lakeshore, 2013–2014; former Deputy Mayor of Toronto)
- Former MPs:
- Former Senators:
- Former municipal politicians: (3) Nancy Branscombe (London City Councillor for Ward 6, 2006–2014), Doug Ford (Toronto City Councillor for Ward 2, 2010–2014), Hazel McCallion, (Mayor of Mississauga, 1978–2014)
- Former candidates: (10) Steve Black (Timmins—James Bay, 2014), Rick Byers (Oakville, 2011), Liang Chen (Scarborough—Agincourt, 2011 & 2014), Ken Kirupa (Scarborough—Guildwood, 2013 & 2014), Todd McCarthy (Ajax—Pickering, 2011 & 2014), David Ramalho (Scarborough Centre, 2014), Chris Robson (London—Fanshawe, 2014), Larry Scott (Oakville, 2011 & 2014), Farid Wassef (Oak Ridges—Markham, 2011 & 2014), Tracey Weiler (Kitchener—Waterloo, 2012 & 2014)
- Other prominent individuals: (1) Sally Barnes (Former Press Secretary to Premier Bill Davis)
- Organizations:
- Media:
- Policies:

== Withdrawn ==
=== Vic Fedeli ===
Background

MPP for Nipissing (2011–present), Opposition Finance Critic (2013–present), Energy Critic (2011–2013), Finance Critic (2013–Present), Fedeli served as mayor of North Bay, Ontario (2003–2010) for two terms, during which he donated his entire salary to charity. Before entering politics, he ran Fedeli Advertising, which in 1989 was ranked by Profit - the magazine for Small Business as the firm 34th on its list of 50 Best Places to Work in Canada. Fedeli was also recognized as one of Canada's Most Successful Entrepreneurs in an episode of MoneyMakers, hosted by Everett Banning. Additionally, Fedeli served as the dollar-per-year chairman of a non-profit organization in North Bay. Fedeli's campaign is called "OntarioFirst".

Date candidacy declared: September 24, 2014
Date withdrawn: February 4, 2015, endorsed Elliott
Supporters
Support from caucus members: Randy Pettapiece (Perth—Wellington)
Support from federal caucus members: Jay Aspin (Nipissing—Timiskaming)
Support from former provincial caucus members:
Other prominent supporters: Paula Peroni, 2014 Sudbury candidate and Sudbury Catholic District School Board trustee;
Policies

=== Lisa MacLeod ===
Background

MPP for Nepean—Carleton (2006–present), Opposition Treasury Board Critic (2014–present), Energy and Francophone Affairs Critic (2013–2014), Education Critic (2011–2013), Revenue and Government Accountability Critic (2009–2011).

Date candidacy declared: October 6, 2014
Date withdrawn: February 6, 2015, endorsed Elliott
Supporters
Support from caucus members: Steve Clark (Leeds—Grenville), Garfield Dunlop (Simcoe North), Julia Munro (York—Simcoe), Jim McDonell (Stormont—Dundas—South Glengarry)
Support from federal caucus members: Senator Bob Runciman, former interim PC Leader and cabinet minister, former MPP for Leeds—Grenville
Support from former provincial caucus members: Norm Sterling (Carleton—Mississippi Mills, Lanark—Carleton, Carleton, 1979–2011)
Other prominent supporters:
Policies:

=== Monte McNaughton ===
Background

MPP for Lambton—Kent—Middlesex (2011–present), Opposition Critic for Citizenship, Immigration and International Trade (2014–present), Labour Critic (2013–2014), Economic Development and Innovation Critic (2011–2013). Prior to entering provincial politics, McNaughton sat on the city council of Newbury and was general manager and co-owner of McNaughton Family Shopping Centre in Newbury. He also served as chair of the Newbury Economic Development Committee and was president of the Strathroy and District Chamber of Commerce in 2009–10.

Date candidacy declared: September 17, 2014
Date withdrawn: April 9, 2015; endorsed Brown.
Supporters
Support from caucus members: Bob Bailey (Sarnia—Lambton)
Supports from federal caucus members:
Supports from former provincial caucus members: Darcy McKeough (Kent West, 1963–1967; Chatham—Kent 1967–1981), Marcel Beaubien, (Lambton then Lambton—Kent—Middlesex, 1995–2003), Andrew Naismith Watson, (Chatham—Kent 1978–1985)
Other prominent supporters: Rob Ford, Toronto city councillor and former mayor (2010–2014)
Policies: Social conservative

== Declined ==
- John Baird, Minister of Foreign Affairs (2011–2015) and MP for Ottawa West—Nepean (2006–2015), former MPP (1995–2005) and provincial cabinet minister (1999–2003). Endorsed Elliott
- Rick Byers, Bay Street executive (Borealis Infrastructure) and former federal and provincial candidate in Oakville. Endorsed Elliott
- Michael Chong, MP for Wellington—Halton Hills (2004–present), federal Minister of Intergovernmental Affairs, President of the Queen's Privy Council for Canada, and Minister of Sport (2006). Endorsed Elliott
- Richard Ciano, President of the Progressive Conservative Party of Ontario (2012–2015).
- Tony Clement, federal President of the Treasury Board (2011–2015) and MP for Parry Sound-Muskoka (2006–2019), former MPP (1995–2003) and provincial cabinet minister (1997–2003).
- Rick Dykstra, MP for St. Catharines (2006–2015). Endorsed Brown.
- Doug Ford, Toronto City Councillor (2010–2014), and runner-up 2014 Toronto mayoral election. Endorsed Elliott
- Randy Hillier, MPP for Lanark—Frontenac—Lennox and Addington (2007–2022).
- Kellie Leitch, federal Minister of Labour (2013–2015) and MP for Simcoe—Grey (2011–2019). Endorsed Elliott
- Rod Phillips, former chair of the Ontario Lottery and Gaming Corporation, chair of Postmedia Network Inc. and the Greater Toronto CivicAction Alliance.
- Lisa Raitt, federal Minister of Transport (2013–2015) and MP for Halton (2008–2019). Endorsed Elliott

== Results ==
Results announced in Toronto on May 9, 2015

Ballot Count
Candidate	Weighted votes (sum of percentages in each riding)	Percentage
Patrick Brown	6,543	61.8
Christine Elliott	4,040	38.2
Total	10,583	100

Eligible voters: 76,587; turnout: 49.3%

=== Riding results ===
Toronto
Riding	MPP/MP (supported)	Brown	Elliott	Total
Toronto & York
Beaches-East York		54	46	100
Davenport		73	28	100
Eglinton-Lawrence	MP: Joe Oliver	28	72	100
Parkdale-High Park		65	35	100
St. Paul's		41	59	100
Toronto Centre		30	70	100
Toronto-Danforth		53	47	100
Trinity-Spadina		39	61	100
Etobicoke
Etobicoke Centre	MP: Ted Opitz (Elliott)	47	53	100
Etobicoke-Lakeshore	MP: Bernard Trottier (Elliott)	58	42	100
Etobicoke North		77	23	100
North York
Don Valley East	MP: Joe Daniel (Brown)	61	39	100
Don Valley West	MP: John Carmichael (Elliott)	38	62	100
Willowdale	MP: Chungsen Leung	58	42	100
York Centre	MP: Mark Adler (Brown)	58	42	100
York South-Weston	MP: Mike Sullivan	82	18	100
York West		86	14	100
Scarborough
Scarborough-Agincourt		84	16	100
Scarborough Centre	MP: Roxanne James	76	24	100
Scarborough-Guildwood		81	19	100
Scarborough-Rouge River		90	10	100
Scarborough Southwest		72	28	100

905
Riding	MPP/MP (supported)	Brown	Elliott	Total
Hamilton & Niagara
Ancaster-Dundas-Flamborough-Westdale	MP: David Sweet (Elliott)	55	45	100
Brant	MP: Phil McColeman (Brown)	70	30	100
Haldimand-Norfolk	MPP: Toby Barrett (Brown); MP: Diane Finley	71	29	100
Hamilton Centre		70	30	100
Hamilton East-Stoney Creek		72	28	100
Hamilton Mountain		81	19	100
Niagara Falls	MP: Rob Nicholson (Elliott)	43	57	100
Niagara West-Glanbrook	MPP: Tim Hudak; MP: Dean Allison (Brown)	64	36	100
St. Catharines	MP: Rick Dykstra (Brown)	70	30	100
Welland		68	32	100
Peel & Halton
Bramalea-Gore-Malton	MP: Bal Gosal (Brown)	76	24	100
Brampton-Springdale	MP: Parm Gill (Brown)	67	33	100
Brampton West	MP: Kyle Seeback (Brown)	72	28	100
Mississauga-Brampton South	MP: Eve Adams	81	19	100
Mississauga East-Cooksville	MP: Wladyslaw Lizon (Brown)	88	12	100
Mississauga-Erindale	MP: Bob Dechert	75	25	100
Mississauga South	MP: Stella Ambler	48	52	100
Mississauga-Streetsville	MP: Brad Butt (Brown)	74	26	100
Burlington	MP: Mike Wallace (Elliott)	41	59	100
Halton	MP: Lisa Raitt (Elliott)	68	32	100
Oakville	MP: Terence Young (Elliott)	44	56	100
York & Simcoe
Markham-Unionville		87	13	100
Newmarket-Aurora	MP: Lois Brown	64	36	100
Oak Ridges-Markham	MP: Paul Calandra (Brown)	74	26	100
Richmond Hill	MP: Costas Menegakis	72	28	100
Thornhill	MPP: Gila Martow (Elliott); MP: Peter Kent (Elliott)	52	48	100
Vaughan		59	41	100
York-Simcoe	MPP: Julia Munro (Elliott); MP: Peter Van Loan	71	29	100
Barrie	MP: Patrick Brown (Brown)	89	11	100
Simcoe-Grey	MPP: Jim Wilson; MP: Kellie Leitch (Elliott)	65	35	100
Simcoe North	MPP: Garfield Dunlop; MP: Bruce Stanton (Elliott)	48	52	100
Durham
Ajax-Pickering	MP: Chris Alexander (Elliott)	54	46	100
Durham	MP: Erin O'Toole (Elliott)	36	64	100
Oshawa	MP: Colin Carrie	48	52	100
Pickering-Scarborough East	MP: Corneliu Chisu	66	34	100
Whitby-Oshawa	MPP: Christine Elliott (Elliott); MP: Pat Perkins (Elliott)	27	73	100

Eastern Ontario
Riding	MPP/MP (supported)	Brown	Elliott	Total
Ottawa
Carleton-Mississippi Mills	MPP: Jack MacLaren (Brown); MP: Gordon O'Connor	68	32	100
Nepean-Carleton	MPP: Lisa MacLeod (Elliott); MP: Pierre Poilievre	62	38	100
Ottawa Centre		56	44	100
Ottawa-Orleans	MP: Royal Galipeau (Brown)	69	31	100
Ottawa South		65	35	100
Ottawa-Vanier		60	40	100
Ottawa West-Nepean	MP: John Baird (Elliott)	53	47	100
Eastern Ontario
Glengarry-Prescott-Russell	MP: Pierre Lemieux (Brown)	58	42	100
Haliburton-Kawartha Lakes-Brock	MPP: Laurie Scott (Elliott); MP: Barry Devolin	29	71	100
Kingston and the Islands		54	46	100
Lanark-Frontenac-Lennox and Addington	MPP: Randy Hillier; MP: Scott Reid	56	44	100
Leeds-Grenville	MPP: Steve Clark (Elliott); MP: Gord Brown (Brown)	47	53	100
Northumberland-Quinte West	MP: Rick Norlock (Elliott)	39	61	100
Peterborough	MP: Dean Del Mastro	61	39	100
Prince Edward-Hastings	MPP: Todd Smith (Elliott); MP: Daryl Kramp (Elliott)	33	67	100
Renfrew-Nipissing-Pembroke	MPP: John Yakabuski; MP: Cheryl Gallant	66	34	100
Stormont-Dundas-South Glengarry	MPP: Jim McDonell (Elliott); MP: Guy Lauzon	55	45	100

Southwestern Ontario
Riding	MPP/MP (supported)	Brown	Elliott	Total
Kitchener-Waterloo
Cambridge	MP: Gary Goodyear	61	39	100
Guelph		56	44	100
Kitchener Centre	MP: Stephen Woodworth	50	50	100
Kitchener-Conestoga	MPP: Michael Harris (Elliott); MP: Harold Albrecht	53	47	100
Kitchener-Waterloo	MP: Peter Braid (Elliott)	58	42	100
Wellington-Halton Hills	MPP: Ted Arnott (Elliott); MP: Michael Chong (Elliott)	53	47	100
London
Elgin-Middlesex-London	MPP: Jeff Yurek (Elliott); MP: Joe Preston (Elliott)	49	51	100
London-Fanshawe		75	25	100
London North Centre	MP: Susan Truppe	66	34	100
London West	MP: Ed Holder (Elliott)	67	33	100
Windsor-Essex
Chatham-Kent-Essex	MPP: Rick Nicholls (Brown); MP: Dave Van Kesteren (Elliott)	73	27	100
Essex	MP: Jeff Watson	75	25	100
Windsor-Tecumseh		80	20	100
Windsor West		89	11	100
Rural
Bruce-Grey-Owen Sound	MPP: Bill Walker (Elliott); MP: Larry Miller	46	54	100
Dufferin-Caledon	MPP: Sylvia Jones (Elliott); MP: David Tilson	57	43	100
Huron-Bruce	MPP: Lisa Thompson (Elliott); MP: Ben Lobb	52	48	100
Lambton-Kent-Middlesex	MPP: Monte McNaughton (Brown); MP: Bev Shipley	85	15	100
Oxford	MPP: Ernie Hardeman (Elliott); MP: Dave Mackenzie (Brown)	46	54	100
Perth-Wellington	MPP: Randy Pettapiece (Elliott); MP: Gary Schellenberger	57	43	100
Sarnia-Lambton	MPP: Bob Bailey (Brown); MP: Pat Davidson	71	29	100

Northern Ontario
Riding	MPP/MP (supported)	Brown	Elliott	Total
Algoma-Manitoulin		49	28	77
Kenora-Rainy River	MP: Greg Rickford	79	21	100
Nickel Belt		58	35	93
Nipissing	MPP: Vic Fedeli (Elliott); MP: Jay Aspin (Elliott)	40	60	100
Parry Sound-Muskoka	MPP: Norm Miller (Elliott); MP: Tony Clement	37	63	100
Sault Ste. Marie	MP: Bryan Hayes	88	12	100
Sudbury		73	27	100
Thunder Bay-Atikokan		73	27	100
Thunder Bay-Superior North		55	32	87
Timiskaming-Cochrane		43	18	61
Timmins-James Bay		38	27	65

== Opinion polling ==
=== All Ontarians ===
Poll source	Date	1st	2nd	3rd	Other
Forum Research; Sample size: 881	March 26, 2015	Christine Elliott; 24%	Monte McNaughton 7%	Patrick Brown; 6%	Someone else 29%, Don't know 34%
Forum Research (subscription required); Sample size: 1,079	September 30-October 1, 2014	Christine Elliott; 14%	Lisa MacLeod; 9%	Patrick Brown; 5%	Vic Fedeli 4%, Monte McNaughton 4%, Someone else 14%, Don't know 43%
Forum Research; Sample size: 810	July 3, 2014	Christine Elliott; 21%	John Baird; 9%	Doug Ford; 8%	Tony Clement 7%, Lisa MacLeod 6%, Lisa Raitt 3%, Someone else 15%, Don't know 30%

=== Progressive Conservative supporters only ===
Poll source	Date	1st	2nd	3rd	Other
Forum Research; Sample size: 310	March 26, 2015	Christine Elliott; 35%	Monte McNaughton 15%	Patrick Brown; 11%	None of these 9%, Don't know 30%
Forum Research (subscription required); Sample size: 367	September 30-October 1, 2014	Christine Elliott; 24%	Lisa MacLeod; 11%	Patrick Brown; 6%	Vic Fedeli 5%, Monte McNaughton 3%, Someone else 20%, Don't know 30%
Forum Research; Sample size: 287	July 3, 2014	Christine Elliott; 25%	John Baird; 14%	Lisa MacLeod; 11%	Tony Clement 7%, Doug Ford 6%, Lisa Raitt 3%, Someone else 15%, Don't know 19%

=== Progressive Conservative Members Only ===
Poll source	Date	1st	2nd	3rd	Other
Mainstreet Research; Sample size: 442	April 30, 2015	Patrick Brown; 62%	Christine Elliott 33%	-	Undecided 5%
Mainstreet Research; Sample size: 348	April 14, 2015	Patrick Brown; 47%	Christine Elliott 41%	-	Undecided 12%
Forum Research; Sample size: 65	March 26, 2015	Christine Elliott; 51%	Monte McNaughton 13%	Patrick Brown; 10%	Someone else 14%, Don't know 11%

== See also ==
- Progressive Conservative Party of Ontario leadership elections
- 2009 Progressive Conservative Party of Ontario leadership election
