= Official Opposition Shadow Cabinet of the 40th Legislative Assembly of Ontario =

The Official Opposition Shadow Cabinet is the shadow cabinet of the main Opposition party, responsible for holding Ministers to account and for developing and disseminating the party's policy positions. In the 40th Legislative Assembly of Ontario, Canada the Official Opposition as of 2012 was formed by the Progressive Conservative Party of Ontario. The shadow cabinet was announced on October 25, 2011 by Tim Hudak, Leader of the Opposition.

| Critic | Portfolio | Duration |
|---|---|---|
| Tim Hudak | Leader of the Opposition | 2009- |
| Christine Elliott | Deputy Leader of the Opposition | 2009- |
| Christine Elliott | Attorney General | 2011-2012 |
| Christine Elliott | Health | 2012 - |
| Christine Elliott | Citizenship and Immigration | 2011- |
| Jim Wilson | House Leader | 2011- |
| Ted Arnott | Intergovernmental Affairs | 2011- |
| Bob Bailey | Community Safety and Correctional Services | 2011-2014 |
| Rod Jackson | Community and Social Services | 2012-2014 |
| Ted Chudleigh | Tourism and Culture | 2011– |
| Steve Clark | Municipal Affairs & Housing | 2011- |
| Steve Clark | Deputy Opposition House Leader | 2012- |
| Garfield Dunlop | Apprenticeship Reform | 2011- |
| Vic Fedeli | Energy | 2011- |
| Ernie Hardeman | Agriculture, Food & Rural Affairs | 2008- |
| Michael Harris | Environment | 2011- |
| Randy Hillier | Labour | 2009- |
| Sylvia Jones | Government Services | 2011-2012 |
| Sylvia Jones | Attorney General | 2012- |
| Sylvia Jones | Deputy Opposition House Leader | 2011-2012 |
| Sylvia Jones | Caucus Chair | 2012- |
| Frank Klees | Transportation | 2009- |
| Frank Klees | Infrastructure | 2009- |
| Rob Leone | Training, Colleges & Universities | 2011- |
| Lisa MacLeod | Education | 2011- |
| Jim McDonell | Consumer Services | 2011- |
| Jane McKenna | Children and Youth Services | 2011- |
| Jane McKenna | Government Services | 2012- |
| Monte McNaughton | Economic Development & Innovation | 2011- |
| Norm Miller | Northern Development & Mines | 2011- |
| Julia Munro | Seniors & Retirement Security | 2011- |
| John O'Toole | Accountability | 2011- |
| Jerry Ouellette | Aboriginal Affairs | 2011- |
| Laurie Scott | Natural Resources | 2011- |
| Laurie Scott | Women's Issues | 2011- |
| Peter Shurman | Finance | 2011-2013 |
| Peter Shurman | Francophone Affairs | 2007-2013 |
| Peter Shurman | Toronto Affairs | 2011-2013 |
| Todd Smith | Small Business & Red Tape | 2011- |
| John Yakabuski | Community Safety | 2011- |
| John Yakabuski | Chief Opposition Whip | 2011- |

== See also ==
- Executive Council of Ontario
- Ontario New Democratic Party Shadow Cabinet of the 40th Legislative Assembly of Ontario
