= Leeds—Grenville—Thousand Islands and Rideau Lakes =

Leeds—Grenville—Thousand Islands and Rideau Lakes could refer to:

- Leeds—Grenville—Thousand Islands and Rideau Lakes (federal electoral district)
- Leeds—Grenville—Thousand Islands and Rideau Lakes (provincial electoral district)
