= Jill Dunlop =

Canadian politician

The Honourable Jill Dunlop ECO MPP
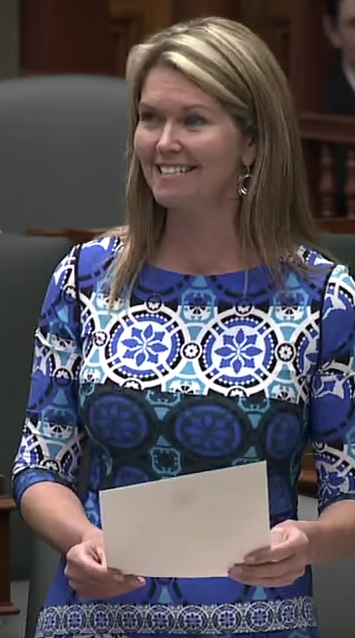
- Dunlop in 2019

Minister of Emergency Preparedness and Response
- Incumbent
- Assumed office March 19, 2025
- Premier: Doug Ford
- Preceded by: Position established

Minister of Education
- In office August 16, 2024 – March 19, 2025
- Premier: Doug Ford
- Preceded by: Todd Smith
- Succeeded by: Paul Calandra

Minister of Colleges and Universities
- In office June 18, 2021 – August 16, 2024
- Premier: Doug Ford
- Preceded by: Ross Romano
- Succeeded by: Nolan Quinn

Associate Minister of Children and Women's Issues
- In office June 20, 2019 – June 18, 2021
- Premier: Doug Ford
- Preceded by: Lisa MacLeod (Note: Lisa MacLeod as Minister responsible for Women's Issues.)
- Succeeded by: Jane McKenna

Member of the Ontario Provincial Parliament for Simcoe North
- Incumbent
- Assumed office June 7, 2018
- Preceded by: Patrick Brown

Personal details
- Born: February 7, 1975 (age 51)
- Party: Progressive Conservative
- Parents: Garfield Dunlop (father); Jane Dunlop (mother)
- Occupation: Post secondary administrator

Jill Dunlop ECO MPP is a Canadian politician who has been the Ontario minister of emergency preparedness and response since 2025. Dunlop has represented the Progressive Conservative (PC) Party in the Legislative Assembly of Ontario since 2018 as the member of Provincial Parliament (MPP) for Simcoe North. She was previously the province's associate minister of children and women's issues from 2019 to 2021, minister of colleges and universities from 2021 to 2024 and minister of education from 2024 to 2025.

== Personal life ==
She was born and raised in the rural town of Coldwater, Ontario. She is the daughter of Jane Dunlop, former deputy mayor of Severn, Ontario and Garfield Dunlop, who represented the same electoral district from 1999 to 2015.

== Political career ==
Dunlop was elected as a MPP in 2018. She was appointed as the associate minister of children and women's issues in 2019, before becoming the minister of colleges and universities in 2021. She was appointed to her current position as minister of education in 2024. She was appointed as the first minister of emergency preparedness and response in 2025.

== Electoral record ==
2025 Ontario general election: Simcoe North
Party	Candidate	Votes	%	±%
Progressive Conservative	Jill Dunlop	24,849	51.38	+1.58
Liberal	Walter Alvarez-Bardales	13,328	27.56	+10.12
New Democratic	Jordi Malcolm	4,813	9.95	–7.79
Green	Chris Carr	3,214	6.65	–2.15
New Blue	Dave Brunelle	1,582	3.27	+0.16
Libertarian	William Joslin	579	1.20	+0.51
Total valid votes/expense limit		48,365	99.21	–0.30
Total rejected, unmarked, and declined ballots		387	0.79	+0.30
Turnout		48,752	46.57	+0.33
Eligible voters		104,695		
Progressive Conservative hold		Swing		–4.27
Source: Elections Ontario

2022 Ontario general election: Simcoe North
Party	Candidate	Votes	%	±%
Progressive Conservative	Jill Dunlop	23,041	49.80	+2.89
New Democratic	Elizabeth Van Houtte	8,208	17.74	−10.29
Liberal	Aaron Cayden Hiltz	8,070	17.44	−0.26
Green	Krystal Brooks	4,071	8.80	+2.05
New Blue	Mark Douris	1,438	3.11	
Ontario Party	Aaron MacDonald	1,119	2.42	
Libertarian	William Joslin	318	0.69	+0.09
Total valid votes		46,265	100.0	
Total rejected, unmarked, and declined ballots		228		
Turnout		46,493	46.24	
Eligible voters		101,053		
Progressive Conservative hold		Swing		+6.59
Source(s): "Summary of Valid Votes Cast for Each Candidate" (PDF). Elections Ontario. 2022. Archived from the original on May 18, 2023.; "Statistical Summary by Electoral District" (PDF). Elections Ontario. 2022. Archived from the original on May 21, 2023.

2018 Ontario general election: Simcoe North
Party	Candidate	Votes	%	±%
Progressive Conservative	Jill Dunlop	25,236	46.92	+2.98
New Democratic	Elizabeth Van Houtte	15,078	28.03	+12.48
Liberal	Gerry Marshall	9,523	17.70	-14.82
Green	Valerie Powell	3,632	6.75	-1.24
Libertarian	Cynthia Sneath	320	0.59	
Total valid votes		53,789	100.0	
Progressive Conservative gain from Independent		Swing		-8.97
Source: Elections Ontario
