= Ontario New Democratic Party Shadow Cabinet of the 40th Legislative Assembly of Ontario =

The Ontario New Democratic Party Shadow Cabinet for the 40th Legislative Assembly of Ontario was announced on October 25, 2011.

Critic	Portfolio	Duration
Andrea Horwath	Leader of the NDP	2009-2022
Andrea Horwath	Intergovernmental Affairs	2009-2014
Teresa Armstrong	Training, Colleges & Universities	2011-2014
Teresa Armstrong	Seniors	2011-2014
Gilles Bisson	House Leader	2011–2014
Gilles Bisson	Transportation	2010–2014
Sarah Campbell	Natural Resources	2011-2014
Sarah Campbell	Aboriginal Affairs	2011–2014
Cheri DiNovo	Community and Social Services	2011–2014
Cheri DiNovo	Women's Issues	2011-2014
Cheri DiNovo	Whip	2011-2014
Cindy Forster	Municipal Affairs & Housing	2011-2014
France Gélinas	Health and Long Term Care	2007–2014
France Gélinas	Francophone Affairs	2008–2014
Michael Mantha	Northern Development & Mines	2011–2014
Rosario Marchese	Economic Development & Innovation	2011–2014
Rosario Marchese	Greater Toronto Area Issues	2009–2014
Paul Miller	Government Services	2009–2014
Paul Miller	Sport	2011–2014
Paul Miller	Tourism and Culture	2011–2014
Taras Natyshak	Labour	2011–2014
Taras Natyshak	Community Safety and Correctional Services	2011–2014
Taras Natyshak	Infrastructure	2011–2014
Michael Prue	Finance	2011–2014
Michael Prue	Citizenship and Immigration	2011-2014
Jonah Schein	Environment	2011–2014
Jonah Schein	Urban Transportation	2011-2014
Jagmeet Singh	Attorney General	2011–2014
Jagmeet Singh	Consumer Services	2011-2014
Peter Tabuns	Energy	2007–2014
Peter Tabuns	Education	2011-2014
Monique Taylor	Children and Youth Services	2011–2014
John Vanthof	Agriculture, Food & Rural Affairs	2011-2014

== See also ==
- Executive Council of Ontario
- Official Opposition Shadow Cabinet of the 40th Legislative Assembly of Ontario
