= Jeannette Runciman Island =

- Interactive map of Jeannette Runciman Island

Geography
- Location: Thousand Islands
- Coordinates: 44.4407215°N 75.8269382°W
- Area: 565 m^{2} (6,080 sq ft)
- Length: 49 m (161 ft)
- Width: 22 m (72 ft)

Administration
- Canada
- Province: Ontario
- County: Leeds and Grenville

Jeannette Runciman Island is an island in the Thousand Islands archipelago, within the United Counties of Leeds and Grenville in Ontario, Canada. It was named in honour of Jeannette Runciman, the spouse of retired Canadian politician Bob Runciman. Jeannette Runciman was killed in 2020 when she was struck by a small SUV in the parking lot of Brockville General Hospital in Brockville, Ontario.
