= Ministry of Emergency Preparedness and Response =

Ontarian provincial government ministry

- Ministère de la Protection civile et de l’intervention en cas d’urgence (French)
- Arms of the Government of Ontario

Government ministry overview
- Formed: 2025
- Jurisdiction: Government of Ontario
- Headquarters: 25 Morton Shulman Avenue, Toronto, Ontario, M3M 0B1
- Employees: 136
- Annual budget: $66 million
- Minister responsible: Jill Dunlop, Minister of Emergency Preparedness and Response
- Website: www.ontario.ca/page/ministry-emergency-preparedness-response

The Ministry of Emergency Preparedness and Response is an Ontario government ministry responsible for the coordination, promotion, development and implementation of programs related to prevention, preparedness, mitigation, response and recovery from emergencies in Ontario. This includes administration of the Emergency Management Ontario Program. It is the office of emergency management and division of the Ontario government responsible for coordinating and overseeing emergency management across the province.

== Emergency Management Ontario ==
While the Ministry was established in 2025, and before Emergency Management Ontario (EMO) was brought under the Ministry, EMO was established in 1980 as its own agency to play a key role in ensuring municipalities and provincial ministries implement comprehensive emergency management initiatives.

In cases where local capacities are overwhelmed, EMO may municipalities in accessing additional resources and support. During large-scale crises, the Premier and Cabinet of Ontario can declare a provincial emergency under the Emergency Management and Civil Protection Act, enabling the issuance of special emergency orders to protect the safety of Ontarians.

The agency also provides guidance and support to communities, First Nations, and ministries, offering advice on emergency management program development and execution.

=== Individual and Family Level ===
The foundation of emergency management begins at the individual level. Citizens are responsible for their own safety and preparedness, which includes planning for emergencies that may temporarily isolate entire neighborhoods from local services and utilities. Individuals and families are encouraged to have emergency supplies to sustain themselves for at least 72 hours.

=== Municipal Level ===
Each municipality in Ontario is required to develop and maintain a comprehensive emergency management program under the Emergency Management and Civil Protection Act (EMCPA). Municipal programs are designed to protect the lives and property of residents through prevention, preparedness, response, and recovery initiatives. In situations where a municipality's capacity to respond is exceeded, the local government may declare an emergency to access additional resources and support.

=== Provincial Coordination ===
When local capabilities are overwhelmed, EMO steps in to provide coordination and additional support. The Provincial Emergency Operations Centre (PEOC) serves as the central hub for managing emergencies at the provincial level, ensuring efficient deployment of resources and coordination among ministries. In large-scale emergencies, the Premier and Cabinet may declare a provincial emergency, enabling the issuance of special emergency orders to protect public safety.

=== Federal Assistance ===
In cases where both municipal and provincial capacities are either insufficient or have been exhausted, the province can formally request federal assistance through the PEOC. Federal involvement is limited to situations where resources are beyond provincial capacity or when the emergency affects areas of federal jurisdiction, ensuring a seamless integration of support across all levels of government.

=== Geographical Divisions ===
For administrative and response purposes, Ontario is divided into two primary emergency management areas: North and East, and South and West. These areas are further subdivided into sectors, each encompassing approximately 40 to 50 municipalities. Each sector is assigned an Emergency Management Field Officer, responsible for supporting local emergency management programs and ensuring coordination with provincial efforts.

==== Sectors ====
Sector	Municipalities
Amethyst	Kenora District Rainy River District Thunder Bay District
Albany	Algoma District Cochrane District
Bruce	Bruce County Dufferin County Grey County Huron County Perth County Wellington County
Capital	City of Ottawa Lanark County Renfrew County United Counties of Prescott and Russell United Counties of Stormont, Dundas and Glengarry
Golden Horseshoe	City of Toronto Halton Region Niagara Region Peel Region Waterloo Region York Region
Killarney	Manitoulin District Sudbury District Timiskaming District
Lakes	District Municipality of Muskoka Nipissing District Parry Sound District
Loyalist	Frontenac County Hastings County Leeds & Grenville County Lennox & Addington County Prince Edward County
Severn	Durham Region City of Kawartha Lakes Haliburton County Northumberland County Peterborough County Simcoe County
St. Clair	Chatham-Kent Elgin County Essex County Lambton County Middlesex County Oxford County

=== Provincial Emergency Operations Centre ===
The Provincial Emergency Operations Centre (PEOC), located at 25 Morton Shulman Avenue in Toronto, serves as the hub for Ontario’s emergency management activities, ensuring coordinated support for municipalities and First Nations during provincial-level emergencies. Staffed 24/7, the PEOC monitors situations both within and outside the province, allowing for rapid response and informed decision-making when emergencies arise.

The PEOC plays a vital role in Ontario’s emergency management system by:

- Coordinating the Ontario government’s response to major emergencies.
- Serving as the single point of contact for municipalities and First Nations to request provincial assistance.

During emergencies, the PEOC ensures that responses are effectively coordinated with the lead ministry responsible for the specific hazard, facilitating a unified and efficient approach to crisis management.

In 2025, a new headquarters was contracted to be built at 111 Disco Road in Toronto.

== Ontario Corps ==
In 2024, Ontario Corps was launched, a group of professionals and volunteers that the province can deploy to help communities respond to natural disasters and other emergencies, while promoting civic engagement and community participation. There are several Ontario Corps partner organizations.
