= Bob Runciman =

Canadian politician

The Honourable Bob Runciman CM OOnt ECO

Canadian Senator from Ontario
- In office January 29, 2010 – August 10, 2017
- Nominated by: Stephen Harper
- Appointed by: Michaëlle Jean

Leader of the Official Opposition
- In office October 10, 2007 – July 1, 2009
- Preceded by: John Tory
- Succeeded by: Tim Hudak
- In office September 28, 2004 – March 29, 2005
- Preceded by: Ernie Eves
- Succeeded by: John Tory

Leader of the Progressive Conservative Party of Ontario
- Interim
- In office March 20, 2009 – June 27, 2009
- Preceded by: John Tory
- Succeeded by: Tim Hudak

Member of the Ontario Provincial Parliament for Leeds—Grenville (Leeds; 1981–1987)
- In office March 19, 1981 – January 29, 2010
- Preceded by: James Auld
- Succeeded by: Steve Clark

Personal details
- Born: Robert William Runciman; August 10, 1942 (age 83) Brockville, Ontario, Canada
- Party: Conservative; Progressive Conservative
- Spouse: Jeannette Bax (deceased)
- Profession: Politician; businessman

Robert William "Bob" Runciman CM OOnt (born August 10, 1942) is a Canadian politician and former provincial Leader of the Opposition in the Ontario Legislature. First elected to the Legislative Assembly of Ontario in 1981, he held the seat continuously for Progressive Conservative Party of Ontario for the next 29 years. On January 29, 2010, he was appointed to the Senate of Canada as a Conservative, where he served until August 10, 2017.

== Early career ==
Before going to Queen's Park, Runciman owned a local weekly newspaper, and sat as a municipal councillor in Brockville from 1972 to 1981. He also worked in production management in the chemical industry.

== Provincial politics ==
He was elected to the Legislative Assembly of Ontario in the 1981 provincial election as a Progressive Conservative Member of Provincial Parliament (MPP) for Leeds in eastern Ontario. He was returned in each subsequent provincial election, and later represented the riding of Leeds—Grenville.

=== Miller cabinet ===
Runciman served as Minister of Government Services from February 8 to May 17, 1985, and as Minister of Consumer Relations from May 17 to June 26, 1985, in the short-lived cabinet of Ontario Premier Frank Miller.

Miller ministry, Province of Ontario (1985)
Cabinet posts (2)
Predecessor	Office	Successor
Gordon Walker	Minister of Consumer and Commercial Relations; 1985 (May–June)	Monte Kwinter
George Ashe	Minister of Government Services; 1985 (February–May)	James Gordon

=== Opposition ===
With the defeat of Miller's government on a vote of confidence, Runciman joined his party on the opposition benches. He was nearly defeated by Liberal Jim Jordan in the 1987 election, winning by only 198 votes. On all other occasions, he has been re-elected without difficulty. Despite being on the right wing of the party, Runciman endorsed Red Tory Larry Grossman for the party leadership in November 1985.

=== Harris and Eves cabinet ===
When the Tories returned to power in the 1995 election, Runciman became Solicitor General and Minister of Correctional Services in the government of Mike Harris, holding the position from June 26, 1995, to June 17, 1999. During this period, he championed privately owned prisons, and was criticized on one occasion for revealing the name of a young offender in the legislature. On June 17, 1999, he was moved to the portfolio of Minister of Consumer and Commercial Relations, and on February 8, 2001, was named Minister of Economic Development and Trade.

Runciman supported Ernie Eves's successful bid to succeed Harris as leader of the Progressive Conservative Party in 2002. On April 15, 2002, Eves re-appointed Runciman to the position of Minister of Public Safety and Security (as the position of Solicitor General became known in the period following the September 11 attacks).

On August 6, 2003, Runciman made controversial comments in the wake of tensions between Toronto's black community and the city's police. "I think some people make a living off this," Runciman said. "People who don't accept any degree of responsibility to solve the challenges and misunderstandings." After confirming that he was referring to members of the black community, he went on to say that "some folks here appear to have, in my view, a vested interest in seeing this kind of tension continue to exist." His comments were later condemned by the Canadian Race Relations foundation and several other opposition MPP's.

Eves ministry, Province of Ontario (2002–2003)
Cabinet post (1)
Predecessor	Office	Successor
Rob Sampson	Minister of Public Safety and Security; 2002–2003	Monte Kwinter
Harris ministry, Province of Ontario (1995–2002)
Cabinet posts (4)
Predecessor	Office	Successor
Al Palladini	Minister of Economic Development and Trade; 2001–2002	Jim Flaherty (Note: Ministry named as Enterprise, Opportunity and Innovation.)
David Tsubouchi	Minister of Consumer and Commercial Relations; 1999–2001	Norm Sterling (Note: Ministry renamed as Consumer and Business Services.)
David Christopherson	Minister of Correctional Services; 1995–1999	Rob Sampson
David Christopherson	Solicitor General; 1995–1999	David Tsubouchi

=== Return to opposition ===
Runciman returned to the opposition benches with the defeat of the Eves government in the 2003 election. He supported John Tory in the leadership election to succeed Eves. Tory won the contest, and, not having a seat in the legislature, named Runciman to the position of interim Leader of the Opposition in September 2004.

Although Runciman holds strongly conservative views on matters such as criminal justice, he was not regarded as one of the more ideological members of his caucus. In recent years, he has played a significant role in his party's leadership transitions.

Runciman resumed the position of opposition leader following the 2007 provincial election in which John Tory failed to win a seat in the Legislature, losing to Liberal Minister Kathleen Wynne. Tory stayed on as Party Leader until March 2009 when he lost a subsequent bid to get elected in a by-election and resigned. Following Tory's resignation as Party Leader in March 2009, members of the PC Caucus selected Runciman as interim Party Leader until Tim Hudak was elected to the position in June 2009.

Legislative Assembly of Ontario
Preceded by Ernie Eves	Leader of the Opposition in the Ontario Legislature; 2004–2005	Succeeded by John Tory
Preceded by John Tory	Leader of the Opposition in the Ontario Legislature; 2007–2009	Succeeded by Tim Hudak
Party political offices
Preceded by John Tory	Interim Leader of the Ontario PC Party; 2009 (March–June)	Succeeded by Tim Hudak

== Federal politics ==
Runciman supported Tom Long's bid to lead the Canadian Alliance in 2000. When Long was dropped from the contest after the first ballot, he turned his support to Stockwell Day, the eventual winner.

In the 2004 federal Conservative leadership campaign, Runciman was an early supporter of eventual winner Stephen Harper.

On May 17, 2005, Runciman was chastised for remarks he made about federal member of Parliament Belinda Stronach's decision to cross the floor from the Conservative Party of Canada to the Liberal Party of Canada. Runciman said, "She sort of defined herself as something of a dipstick, an attractive one, but still a dipstick."

Runciman was appointed to the Canadian Senate on the recommendation of Prime Minister Harper on January 29, 2010. He is seen as an ally of Harper in advocating of Senate reform and a "law and order" agenda. He served in the Senate until reaching the mandatory retirement age on August 10, 2017.

== Memoirs ==
Runciman officially released his memoirs of his 45-year career at an event at the Royal Brock Centre in Brockville, Ontario on June 30, 2023, two days after launching his website. In the memoirs, Runciman discusses the Ipperwash shooting of Dudley George, his resignation as Solicitor-General over a breach of the Young Offenders Act which was later determined he was not guilty of, and addresses his controversial remarks about Belinda Stronach after she crossed the floor from the Conservative Party to the Liberal Party in 2005. He also shares stories including hiding on the floor of the Ontario Legislature to avoid votes, his supportive relationship with father, Publisher and Musician Sandy Runciman, and his marriage to Jeannette Runciman (née Bax), who died in a tragic accident in 2020, and who has an island named for her in the Thousand Islands region of Eastern Ontario.
