= Small Business Agency of Ontario =

The Small Business Agency of Ontario (SBAO) is an agency of the Government of Ontario, operating as part of the Ministry of Economic Development and Trade. It was established by the government of Dalton McGuinty in 2005.

The agency's website indicates that it has helped facilitate a better system of communication between the provincial government and small business.
