= Garfield Dunlop =

Canadian politician

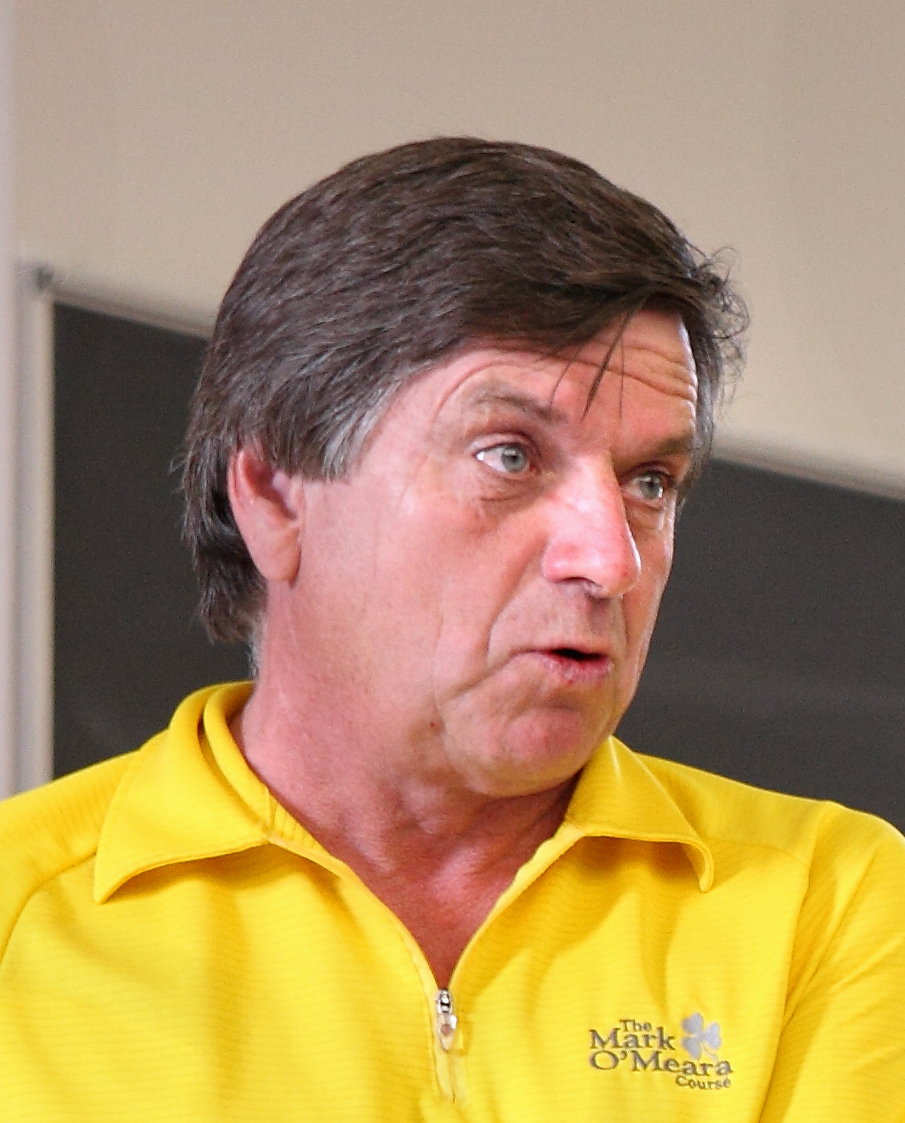
- Dunlop at a conference in June 2009

Ontario MPP
- In office 1999–2015
- Preceded by: Al McLean
- Succeeded by: Patrick Brown
- Constituency: Simcoe North

Personal details
- Born: February 28, 1952 (age 74)
- Party: Progressive Conservative
- Spouse: Jane Dunlop
- Children: Jill Dunlop
- Education: University of Waterloo
- Occupation: Businessman

Garfield Dunlop is a former politician in Ontario, Canada. He was a Progressive Conservative member of the Legislative Assembly of Ontario from 1999 to 2015 who represented the riding of Simcoe North. He resigned from the legislature in 2015 in order to provide a vacancy so that former PC leader Patrick Brown could seek a seat in the legislature.

== Background ==
Dunlop was educated at the University of Waterloo. In 1971, he joined his family business, Glen Dunlop Plumbing, Heating and Supplies.

== Politics ==
In 1980, Dunlop was elected a councillor in the village of Coldwater, Ontario. He served as reeve of the village from 1982 to 1994, and as deputy mayor of the township of Severn from 1994 to 1999. In 1998, he was named warden of Simcoe County.

Dunlop was elected to the Ontario legislature in the 1999 provincial election. He won the Progressive Conservative nomination in Simcoe North following the resignation amid scandal of sitting MPP Al McLean. Dunlop defeated his Liberal opponent George MacDonald, in 1999, by about 7,000 votes. He was re-elected in four times from 2003 to 2014. In 2014 his vote count dropped dramatically, while his opponents made significant gains, in what has been considered a safe riding for Progressive Conservative candidates.

Dunlop was appointed deputy government whip after his election, but was not given a cabinet position in the governments of Mike Harris or Ernie Eves. He was one of only 24 Tories re-elected in the 2003 election, defeating Liberal Paul Sloan by 3680 votes.

Dunlop is socially conservative. While campaigning in 2003, he handed out literature against same-sex marriage, which he referred to as a sin. Dunlop is also known to support private prisons.

As an Opposition member, Dunlop served as chief opposition whip from 2003 to 2005 and was Progressive Conservative critic for community safety and correctional services from 2003 to 2011 and was chair of the Standing Committee on Estimates from 2009 to 2011. From 2011 to 2014 he was critic for Training and Apprenticeship and from 2014 until 2015 he served as critic for Education as well as for Training, Colleges and Universities.

During the 2015 Progressive Conservative leadership campaign, Dunlop supported Lisa MacLeod and criticized eventual winner Patrick Brown, at the time federal Member of Parliament for Barrie without a seat in the Ontario legislature, for being "a federal member who’s made no headway whatsoever in the Harper government in the eight or nine years he’s been there." Dunlop added: "How could I possibly think he could come to Ontario and do a good job when he couldn’t even make cabinet in Ottawa?"

Nevertheless, on July 22, 2015, Dunlop announced he would step aside and allow Brown to run in the riding so that he could enter the legislature. Dunlop's resignation took effect August 1, 2015.

His daughter, Jill Dunlop, was elected to represent Simcoe North in the 2018 provincial election.

== See also ==
- List of University of Waterloo people
