= Ontario PC Campus Association =

- Founded: 1976
- Ideology: Conservatism
- Youth affiliation: Ontario PC Youth Association

The Ontario PC Campus Association (OPCCA) was the student association of the Progressive Conservative Party of Ontario, Canada. The organization consists of Ontario Progressive Conservative Party members attending universities and colleges in the province. In July 2019, the organization merged with the Ontario PC Youth Association (OPCYA) and formed the new Ontario Young PCs organization.

== Structure ==
The Ontario PC Campus Association was directed by the OPCCA Executive, consisting of the President, Vice President, Secretary-Treasurer, Director of Membership and Recruitment, Director of Communications, Director of Campus Activism, Director of Training, Director of Fundraising, Director of Policy, and the Past President. The OPCCA Executive is elected at the Annual General Meeting of the Association, called at least every fourteen months.

The Ontario PC Campus Association coordinated with the Ontario PC Youth Association, which is the youth wing of the Ontario PC Party.

== Campuses ==
The primary responsibility of the Ontario PC Campus Association is to maintain and coordinate relationships across Ontario campuses. Local organization largely falls to the presidents of campus clubs at Ontario universities.
