= Richard Ciano =

Richard Ciano is the former president of the Progressive Conservative Party of Ontario and a Canadian market researcher.

Ciano is a principal at Campaign Research, a full-service marketing research agency that he founded in 2003. His company works with clients in the entertainment, aviation, agriculture, and energy industries.

He was elected as president of the Progressive Conservative Party of Ontario at the party's 2012 annual general meeting in Niagara Falls. Ciano won with an overwhelming 54% of the vote in a three-way contest against Kevin Gaudet and John Snobelen.

He is also a former elected national vice president and national councillor (Ontario) of the Conservative Party of Canada. He was elected to the national council of the Conservative Party of Canada in 2005 at the Conservative Party of Canada's founding convention in Montreal and served until 2008.

While serving in his federal positions, Ciano founded the Conservative Campaign University, a political training school for activists in the Conservative Party of Canada.

He has served as campaign manager and as a senior strategist to prominent conservative politicians including Peter Van Loan, Peter Shurman, and Rob Ford. Notably, Ciano was a senior advisor to Ford's 2010 Toronto mayoral election campaign, serving as chief strategist and pollster.

Ciano is a graduate of York University and has a CMRP (Certified Marketing Research Professional) designation from the Marketing Research Intelligence Association. He lives in Toronto, Ontario.
