= Ontario Young Progressive Conservative Association =

Ontario Young PCs
- President: Bruce Yu
- Founded: 1954
- Ideology: Progressive Conservatism
- Website: https://oypc.ontariopc.ca/

The Ontario Young Progressive Conservative Association or Ontario Young PCs (OYPC) is the youth wing of the Progressive Conservative Party of Ontario. The organization consists of Ontario Progressive Conservative Party activists between the ages of 14 and 26.

== Structure ==
The Ontario Young Progressive Conservative Association is governed by the OYPC Executive (elected at the Annual General Meeting), consisting of the President, Vice Presidents(s), Secretary, Treasurer, as well as Directors. The President of the OYPC concurrently serves on the executive of the Ontario PC Party.

In 2019, the Ontario PC Youth Association (founded in 1954) merged with the Ontario PC Campus Association, which was the body responsible for conservative student clubs at Ontario universities, forming the Ontario Young PCs.

The OYPC is responsible for the administration of Ontario PC campus clubs at post-secondary institutions and Ontario PC Youth Riding Committees (YRC) in each of Ontario's electoral districts.

== Alumni ==
A number of former members and executives of the Ontario PC young wing have gone on to hold elected office. A selection of prominent former members is listed below.

- The Honourable John Baird, PC
- The Honourable Tony Clement, PC
- The Honourable Peter Van Loan, PC
- The Honourable Dr. K. Kellie Leitch, PC OOnt FRCSC
- Rod Phillips, former MPP and former Ontario cabinet minister
- Lisa MacLeod, MPP and former Ontario cabinet minister
- The Honourable Stephen Lecce, MPP and Minister of Education
- His Worship John Tory, OOnt
- His Worship Patrick Brown
- Stella Ambler, former MP
- Andrea Khanjin, MPP
- Eric Melillo, MP
