= Leeds—Grenville—Thousand Islands and Rideau Lakes (provincial electoral district) =

Provincial electoral district in Ontario, Canada

Coordinates: 44.681°N 75.882°W

Ontario electoral district
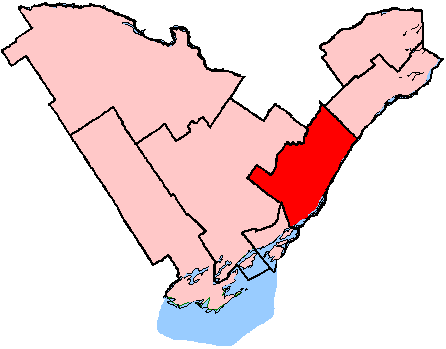
- Leeds–Grenville shown within the Eastern Ontario region

Provincial electoral district
- Legislature: Legislative Assembly of Ontario
MPP
Steve Clark
Progressive Conservative
- District created: 1986
- First contested: 1987
- Last contested: 2025

Demographics
- Population (2016): 100,545
- Electors (2018): 82,511
- Area (km²): 3,747
- Pop. density (per km²): 26.8
- Census division: Leeds and Grenville
- Census subdivision(s): Athens, Augusta, Brockville, Edwardsburgh/Cardinal, Elizabethtown–Kitley, Front of Yonge, Gananoque, Leeds and the Thousand Islands, Merrickville–Wolford, North Grenville, Prescott, Rideau Lakes, Westport

Leeds—Grenville—Thousand Islands and Rideau Lakes is a provincial electoral district in Ontario, Canada, that has been represented in the Legislative Assembly of Ontario since 1987. Before the 2018 election, it was known simply as Leeds—Grenville.

It consists of the United Counties of Leeds and Grenville.

Since 1999, provincial ridings have been defined to have the same borders as federal ridings.

For the 2018 election, the district gave up a small portion of territory to Lanark—Frontenac—Kingston.

== Members of Provincial Parliament ==
Assembly	Years	Member	Party
Leeds—Grenville; Riding created from Leeds and Grenville
34th	1987–1990	Bob Runciman	Progressive Conservative
35th	1990–1995	Bob Runciman	Progressive Conservative
36th	1995–1999	Bob Runciman	Progressive Conservative
37th	1999–2003	Bob Runciman	Progressive Conservative
38th	2003–2007	Bob Runciman	Progressive Conservative
39th	2007–2010	Bob Runciman	Progressive Conservative
39th	2010–2011	Steve Clark	Progressive Conservative
40th	2011–2014	Steve Clark	Progressive Conservative
41st	2014–2018	Steve Clark	Progressive Conservative
Leeds—Grenville—Thousand Islands and Rideau Lakes
42nd	2018–present	Steve Clark	Progressive Conservative

== Election results ==
Winning party in each polling division of Leeds—Grenville—Thousand Islands and Rideau Lakes at the 2025 Ontario general election

2025 Ontario general election
Party	Candidate	Votes	%	±%
Progressive Conservative	Steve Clark	25,118	55.12	–2.57
Liberal	Lorna Jean Edmonds	12,392	27.19	+9.07
New Democratic	Chris Wilson	4,489	9.85	–3.72
Green	Fiona Jager	1,926	4.23	–1.82
New Blue	Chris Garrah	743	1.63	–0.58
Ontario Party	Daniel Calabretta	561	1.23	–0.02
Libertarian	Mark Snow	342	0.75	+0.28
Total valid votes		45,571	99.19	
Total rejected, unmarked and declined ballots		373	0.81	+0.28
Turnout		45,944	51.25	+2.07
Eligible voters		89,653		
Progressive Conservative hold		Swing		–5.82
Source: Elections Ontario

Winning party in each polling division of Leeds—Grenville—Thousand Islands and Rideau Lakes at the 2022 Ontario general election

2022 Ontario general election
Party	Candidate	Votes	%	±%	Expenditures
Progressive Conservative	Steve Clark	24,657	57.69	−3.58	$47,254
Liberal	Josh Bennett	7,746	18.12	+4.76	$12,806
New Democratic	Chris Wilson	5,799	13.57	−6.22	$4,797
Green	Fiona Jager	2,583	6.04	+1.25	$5,669
New Blue	Daniel Kitsch	944	2.21		$2,785
Ontario Party	Glenn L. Malcolm	536	1.25		$0
Libertarian	Mark Snow	202	0.47	−0.32	$84
People's Front	Stephen Ireland	189	0.44		$651
Populist	Dave Senger	88	0.21		$2,415
Total valid votes/expense limit		42,744	99.47	+0.91	$122,329
Total rejected, unmarked, and declined ballots		227	0.53	-0.91	
Turnout		42,971	49.18	-11.04	
Eligible voters		86,459			
Progressive Conservative hold		Swing		−4.17	
Source(s): "Summary of Valid Votes Cast for Each Candidate" (PDF). Elections Ontario. 2022. Archived from the original on May 18, 2023.; "Statistical Summary by Electoral District" (PDF). Elections Ontario. 2022. Archived from the original on May 21, 2023.

2018 Ontario general election
Party	Candidate	Votes	%	±%
Progressive Conservative	Steve Clark	30,002	61.27	+5.20
New Democratic	Michelle Taylor	9,688	19.78	+2.67
Liberal	David Henderson	6,543	13.36	-7.13
Green	Derek Morley	2,347	4.79	-0.10
Libertarian	Bill Buckley	389	0.79	
Total valid votes		48,969	100.00	
Turnout			61.9	
Eligible voters		79,115		
Progressive Conservative hold		Swing		
Source: Elections Ontario

2014 Ontario general election: Leeds—Grenville
Party	Candidate	Votes	%	±%
Progressive Conservative	Steve Clark	23,253	56.07	−7.53
Liberal	Christine Milks	8,499	20.49	+3.06
New Democratic	David Lundy	7,219	17.41	+2.18
Green	Stephen Bowering	2,030	4.89	+1.44
Libertarian	Harold Gabriel	471	1.14	–
Total valid votes		41,472	100.0	+8.43
Progressive Conservative hold		Swing		−5.30
Source(s) Elections Ontario (2014). "Official result from the records, 042 Leeds-Grenville" (PDF).

2011 Ontario general election: Leeds—Grenville
Party	Candidate	Votes	%	±%	Expenditures
Progressive Conservative	Steve Clark	24,314	63.60	−3.08	$ 52,598.00
Liberal	Ray Heffernan	6,663	17.43	−2.65	17,512.99
New Democratic	David Lundy	5,822	15.23	+10.12	13,274.26
Green	Charlie Taylor	1,319	3.45	−4.22	3,731.20
Socialist	Lance Fulsom	111	0.29		0.00
Total valid votes / expense limit		38,229	100.0	+37.72	$ 90,198.43
Total rejected, unmarked and declined ballots		155	0.40	+0.09	
Turnout		38,384	50.64	+14.03	
Eligible voters		75,797		−0.34	
Progressive Conservative hold		Swing		−0.22	
Source(s) "Official return from the records / Rapport des registres officiels - Leeds—Grenville" (PDF). "2011 Candidate Campaign Returns (CR-1)".

Ontario provincial by-election, March 4, 2010: Leeds—Grenville Resignation of Bob Runciman
Party	Candidate	Votes	%	±%	Expenditures
Progressive Conservative	Steve Clark	18,510	66.68	+10.44	$ 27,511.00
Liberal	Stephen Mazurek	5,573	20.08	−8.59	65,190.41
Green	Neil Kudrinko	2,130	7.67	+0.49	14,799.66
New Democratic	Steve Armstrong	1,417	5.10	−1.87	17,118.89
Libertarian	Anthony Giles	129	0.46		297.56
Total valid votes		27,759	100.0	−39.61	
Total rejected ballots		87	0.31	−0.07	
Turnout		27,846	36.61	−24.57	
Eligible voters		76,053		+5.35	
Source(s) "Leeds—Grenville By-Election – March 4, 2010". Elections Ontario. "2010 By-Election Returns – Ottawa West-Nepean – Candidate (CR-1) & Association (CR-3) Returns". "Ontario's Runciman among 5 new senators". Toronto Star. January 29, 2010.

2007 Ontario general election: Leeds—Grenville
Party	Candidate	Votes	%	±%	Expenditures
Progressive Conservative	Bob Runciman	22,755	56.24	+7.54	$ 51,680.90
Liberal	Lori Bryden	11,602	28.67	−11.46	38,465.17
Green	Jeanie Warnock	2,907	7.18	+3.10	1,870.14
New Democratic	Pauline Kuhlmann	2,821	6.97	+1.36	2,619.71
Family Coalition	Michael Dwyer	377	0.93	−0.54	0.00
Total valid votes/expense limit		40,462	100.0	−8.10	$ 79,644.04
Total rejected ballots		190	0.47	−0.02	
Turnout		40,652	55.11	−7.00	
Eligible voters		73,763		+3.55	
Source(s) "Summary of Valid Votes Cast for Each Candidate – October 10, 2007 General Election" (PDF). "Statistical Summary – General Election 2007" (PDF). Elections Ontario. "2007 Candidate Campaign Returns (CR-1)".

2003 Ontario general election: Leeds—Grenville
Party	Candidate	Votes	%	±%	Expenditures
Progressive Conservative	Bob Runciman	21,443	48.70	−4.40	$ 59,840.81
Liberal	Stephen Mazurek	17,667	40.13	+0.84	57,732.05
New Democratic	Steve Armstrong	2,469	5.61	+0.85	2,720.12
Green	Jerry Heath	1,799	4.09	+1.80	7,267.53
Family Coalition	Melody Trolly	649	1.47		435.25
Total valid votes/expense limit		44,027	100.0	−0.04	$ 68,387.52
Total rejected ballots		217	0.49	−0.15	
Turnout		44,244	62.11	+0.39	
Eligible voters		71,237		−0.81	
Source(s) "General Election of October 2, 2003 – Summary of Valid Ballots by Candidate". Elections Ontario. "General Election of October 2, 2003 – Statistical Summary". "2003 Candidate and Constituency Associations – Candidate Campaign Return (CR-1)".

1999 Ontario general election: Leeds—Grenville
Party	Candidate	Votes	%	±%	Expenditures
Progressive Conservative	Bob Runciman	23,390	53.10	−10.16	$ 65,879.18
Liberal	Don Cameron	17,307	39.29	+13.26	54,543.00
New Democratic	Jim Murray	2,097	4.76	−1.97	2,138.29
Green	Ken Blackburn	1,008	2.29	−0.41	762.21
Natural Law	Britt Roberts	244	0.55		0.00
Total valid votes/expense limit		44,046	100.0	+28.04	$ 68,946.24
Total rejected ballots		282	0.64	−0.10	
Turnout		44,328	61.72	−1.34	
Eligible voters		71,819		+30.69	
Source(s) "General Election of June 3 1999 – Summary of Valid Ballots by Candidate". "General Election of June 3 1999 – Statistical Summary". Elections Ontario. "1999 Candidate and Constituency Associations – Candidate Campaign Return (CR-1)".

1995 Ontario general election: Leeds—Grenville
Party	Candidate	Votes	%	±%	Expenditures
Progressive Conservative	Bob Runciman	21,763	63.27	+14.20	$ 44,550.77
Liberal	Peter McKenna	8,955	26.03	−0.68	45,063.22
New Democratic	Charles Stewart	2,316	6.73	−17.48	3,608.98
Green	Peter Bevan-Baker	927	2.69		1,692.83
Independent	Phillip Blancher	438	1.27		669.80
Total valid votes/expense limit		34,399	100.0	+0.20	$ 47,488.00
Total rejected ballots		255	0.74		
Turnout		34,654	63.06		
Eligible voters		54,953			
Source(s) "General Election of June 8 1995 – Summary of Valid Ballots by Candidate". "General Election of June 8 1995 – Statistical Summary". Elections Ontario. "1995 Details of Candidate Income and Expenses" (3.16MB). & "1995 Summary of Income and Campaign Expenses" ( Word'95 .doc files (146KB)).

1990 Ontario general election: Leeds—Grenville
Party	Candidate	Votes	%	±%
Progressive Conservative	Bob Runciman	16,846	49.07	+5.89
Liberal	Chris Puddicombe	9,172	26.72	−15.88
New Democratic	Art Lane	8,312	24.21	+9.99
Total valid votes		34,330	100.0	+0.25

1987 Ontario general election: Leeds—Grenville
Party	Candidate	Votes	%
Progressive Conservative	Bob Runciman	14,787	43.18
Liberal	Jim Jordan	14,589	42.60
New Democratic	Geri Sheedy	4,869	14.22
Total valid votes		34,245	100.0

== 2007 electoral reform referendum ==
2007 Ontario electoral reform referendum
Side	Votes	%
First Past the Post	28,156	71.19
Mixed Member Proportional	11,392	28.81
Total valid votes	39,548	100.00

== See also ==
- List of Ontario provincial electoral districts
- Canadian provincial electoral districts
