= Progressive Conservative Party of Ontario =

Provincial political party in Canada

Progressive Conservative Party of Ontario Parti progressiste-conservateur de l'Ontario
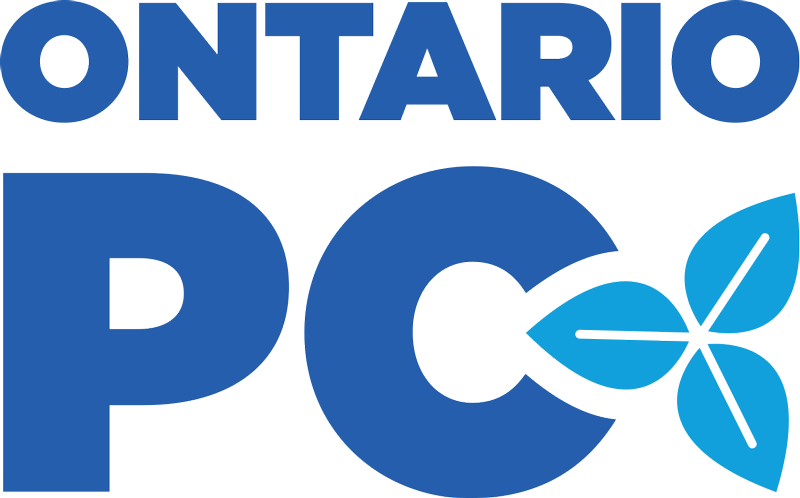
- Abbreviation: PC
- Leader: Doug Ford
- President: Michael Diamond
- Chairperson: Matthew Rae
- Secretary: Hunter Corcoran
- House leader: Steve Clark
- Treasurer: Tony Joosse
- Founders: John A. Macdonald; George-Étienne Cartier
- Founded: 1854; 172 years ago
- Preceded by: Upper Canada Tories
- Headquarters: 400–56 Aberfoyle Crescent; Toronto, Ontario; M8X 2X1
- Youth wing: Ontario Young PCs
- Women's wing: Ontario PC Women in Politics (PCWIP)
- Membership (2018): 64,053
- Ideology: Conservatism (Canadian)
- Political position: Centre-right; 1990s: Right-wing
- Colours: Blue
- Slogan: Protect Ontario
- Provincial Parliament: 79 / 124

Website
- ontariopc.ca

The Progressive Conservative Party of Ontario (PC; French: Parti progressiste-conservateur de l'Ontario), often shortened to the Ontario PC Party, or simply the PCs, colloquially known as the Tories, is a provincial political party in Ontario, Canada. Throughout Ontario's history, it has remained the "natural governing party" at the provincial level.

During its uninterrupted governance from 1943 to 1985 known as the Big Blue Machine, the Ontario PC Party adhered to the ideology of Red Toryism, favouring government intervention in the economy, increased spending on infrastructure, education, and health care while remaining progressive on social issues such as equal pay for women, anti-discrimination laws, voting rights for First Nations people and French-language services. In the 1990s, the party underwent a rightward shift to Blue Toryism after the election of Mike Harris as leader, who was premier from 1995 to 2002 and favoured a "Common Sense Revolution" platform of cutting taxes and reducing government spending while balancing the budget through small government. The PCs lost power in 2003 but came back to win a majority government in 2018 under Doug Ford. They were later re-elected again in 2022 and 2025. Ford established the Ford Nation political movement. This continuous period of governance during the 2020s has been referred to as "a new conservative dynasty".

== History ==
=== Origins ===
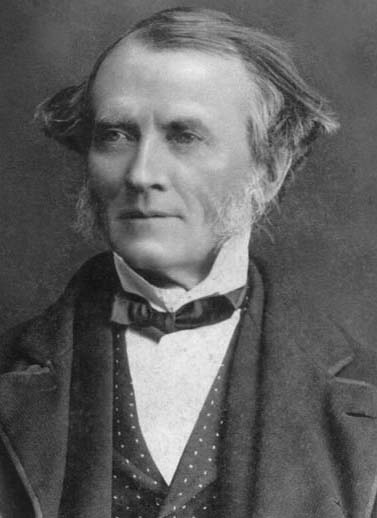
John Sandfield Macdonald

The first Conservative Party in Upper Canada was made up of United Empire Loyalists and supporters of the wealthy Family Compact that ruled the colony. Once responsible government was granted in response to the 1837 Rebellions, the Tories emerged as moderate reformers who opposed the radical policies of the Reformers and then the Clear Grits.

The modern Conservative Party originated in the Liberal-Conservative coalition founded by Sir John A. Macdonald and George-Étienne Cartier in 1854. It is a variant of this coalition that formed the first government in Ontario with John Sandfield Macdonald as premier.

Until becoming the Progressive Conservatives in 1942, the party was officially known as the "Liberal-Conservative Association of Ontario", reflecting its liberal-conservative origins, but became widely known as the Conservative Party.

=== Confederation ===
John Sandfield Macdonald was actually a Liberal, previously co-led the first and only Liberal ministry in the United province of Canada, and sat concurrently as a Liberal Party of Canada member of Parliament (MP) in the House of Commons of Canada. He was however an ally of John A. Macdonald (though not a relative). His government was initially a true coalition of Liberals and Conservatives under his leadership but soon the more radical Reformers bolted to the opposition and Sandfield Macdonald was left leading what was essentially a conservative coalition that included some Liberals under the Liberal-Conservative banner. After losing power in 1871, this conservative coalition began to dissolve. What was originally a party that included Catholics and Protestants became an almost exclusively English and Protestant party, more and more dependent on the Protestant Orange Order for support, and even for its leadership. The party became opposed to funding for separate (Catholic) schools, opposed to language rights for French-Canadians, and distrustful of immigrants. Paradoxically, an element of the party gained a reputation for being pro-labour as a result of links between the Orange Order and the labour movement.

=== Pre-war dynasty ===
After 33 years in Opposition, the Tories returned to power under James P. Whitney, who led a progressive administration in its development of the province. The Whitney government initiated massive public works projects such as the creation of Ontario Hydro. It also enacted reactionary legislation (such as Regulation 17) against the French-Canadian population in Ontario. The Tories were in power for all but five years from 1905 to 1934. After the death of Whitney in 1914, however, they lacked vision and became complacent. The Tories lost power to the United Farmers of Ontario in the 1919 election but were able to regain office in 1923 election due to the UFO's disintegration and divisions in the Ontario Liberal Party. They were defeated by Mitch Hepburn's Liberals in 1934 due to their inability to cope with the Great Depression.

=== Post-war dynasty ===
Late in the 1930s and early in the 1940s, the Conservatives re-organized and developed new policies. Rather than continue to oppose government spending and intervention, a policy which hurt the party politically in the time of the Great Depression, the Conservatives changed their policies to support government action where it would lead to economic growth.

The party changed its name to the "Progressive Conservative" party after its federal counterpart changed its name to the Progressive Conservative Party of Canada in December 1942 on the insistence of its new leader, John Bracken, whose roots were in the populist Progressive Party.

The Progressive Conservatives took advantage of Liberal infighting to win a minority government in the 1943 provincial election, reducing the Liberals to third-party status. Drew called another election in 1945, only two years into his mandate, to get a majority government. The PCs played up Cold War tensions to win a landslide majority, though it emerged several years later that the PC government had set up a secret department of the Ontario Provincial Police to spy on the opposition and the media. The PCs would dominate Ontario politics for the next four decades.

Under Drew and his successor, Leslie Frost, the PCs were a strong champion of rural issues but also invested heavily in the development of civil works throughout the province, including the construction of the 400-series highways, beginning with the 401 across Toronto. On social issues, Frost's Progressive Conservative government passed anti-discrimination laws such as the Fair Employment Practices Act of 1951, the Fair Accommodation Practices Act of 1954 and the Ontario Anti-Discrimination Commission Act of 1958, advocated equal wages for women with the Act to Ensure Fair Remuneration for Female Employees, and granted First Nations people the right to vote in 1955. Frost improved health care access to Ontarians through the passing of the Hospital Services Commission of Ontario Act of 1956 and the launching of the Ontario Hospital Insurance Plan program in 1959. In 1961, John Robarts became the 17th premier of Ontario. He was one of the most popular premiers in years. Under Robarts's leadership, the party epitomized power, continuing Drew and Frost's policies on health care, education, infrastructure and social issues, introducing the Ontario Human Rights Code in 1962. He was an advocate of individual freedoms and promoted the rights of the provinces against what he saw as the centralizing initiatives of the federal government, while also promoting national unity against Quebec separatism. He hosted the 1967 "Confederation of Tomorrow" conference in Toronto in an unsuccessful attempt to achieve an agreement for a new Constitution of Canada.

Robarts opposed Canadian Medicare when it was proposed, but later endorsed it fully, and the party implemented the public health care system that continues to this day. He led the party towards a civil libertarian movement. As a strong believer in the promotion of both official languages, he opened the door to French education in Ontario schools.

=== Big Blue Machine ===
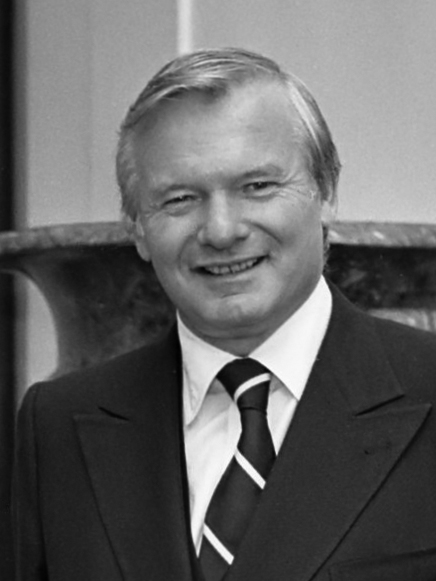
Premier Davis.

In 1971, Bill Davis became party leader and the 18th premier. Anti-Catholicism became an issue again in the 1971 election, when the Tories campaigned strenuously against a Liberal proposal to extend funding for Catholic separate schools until Grade 13. Davis reversed himself in 1985, and enacted the funding extension as one of his last acts before leaving office.

Davis governed until 1985 with a team of advisers known as the "Big Blue Machine" because of their reputed political and strategic skills. Their stamp on the party was so strong that many refer to the Tories' long rule over Ontario as the "Big Blue Machine era".

During its 43 years of domination, the Progressive Conservative Party of Ontario was seen as a centrist party, with the Liberals being to its right and the New Democratic Party to its left. However, its base of support remained with socially conservative voters in rural Southern Ontario. Davis largely reconciled these differences and emerged one of the most popular politicians in Ontario's history. Other conservatives in the federal PC Party accused him of damaging the conservative image in Canada by moving to the left on some issues. Davis continued the rapid expansion of colleges, universities, and highways across Ontario.

=== 1980s to 1995: in Opposition ===
Party logo in 1985

Party logo in 1987

Party logo in 1990

Davis retired in 1985. At a leadership convention, he was succeeded by Industry and Trade Minister Frank Miller. A Blue Tory, Miller was considerably more conservative than Davis, and shifted the Progressive Conservatives to the right. Soon after taking office, he called an election in which the PCs were reduced to a minority government, and actually finished behind the Liberals in the popular vote for the first time in 42 years.

Soon afterward, the Ontario New Democratic Party (NDP) of Bob Rae reached an agreement with David Peterson's Liberals in which the NDP would support a Liberal minority government. Miller was defeated in a no-confidence motion on June 18. Peterson was asked to form a government later in the day, ending the longest period of one-party rule in Canadian provincial history. Miller was replaced as leader by Larry Grossman at a second leadership convention.

When the Liberal-NDP Accord expired, an election was held in 1987 in which the Tories were reduced to third place in the Legislative Assembly of Ontario. They only won 16 seats, their worst showing in over half a century. Grossman was personally defeated in his downtown Toronto riding and resigned immediately. Andy Brandt was the party's interim leader until a leadership election was held in 1990 in which Mike Harris defeated Dianne Cunningham.

Three months after the election of Harris, and only three years into the, typically, four-year term of the Liberal government, David Peterson called a provincial election, in which the PCs failed to improve their standing, but which resulted in the defeat of the Liberals by Rae's NDP.

=== Mike Harris and the "Common Sense Revolution" ===
Logo of the Ontario PC Party from 1995 to 2003

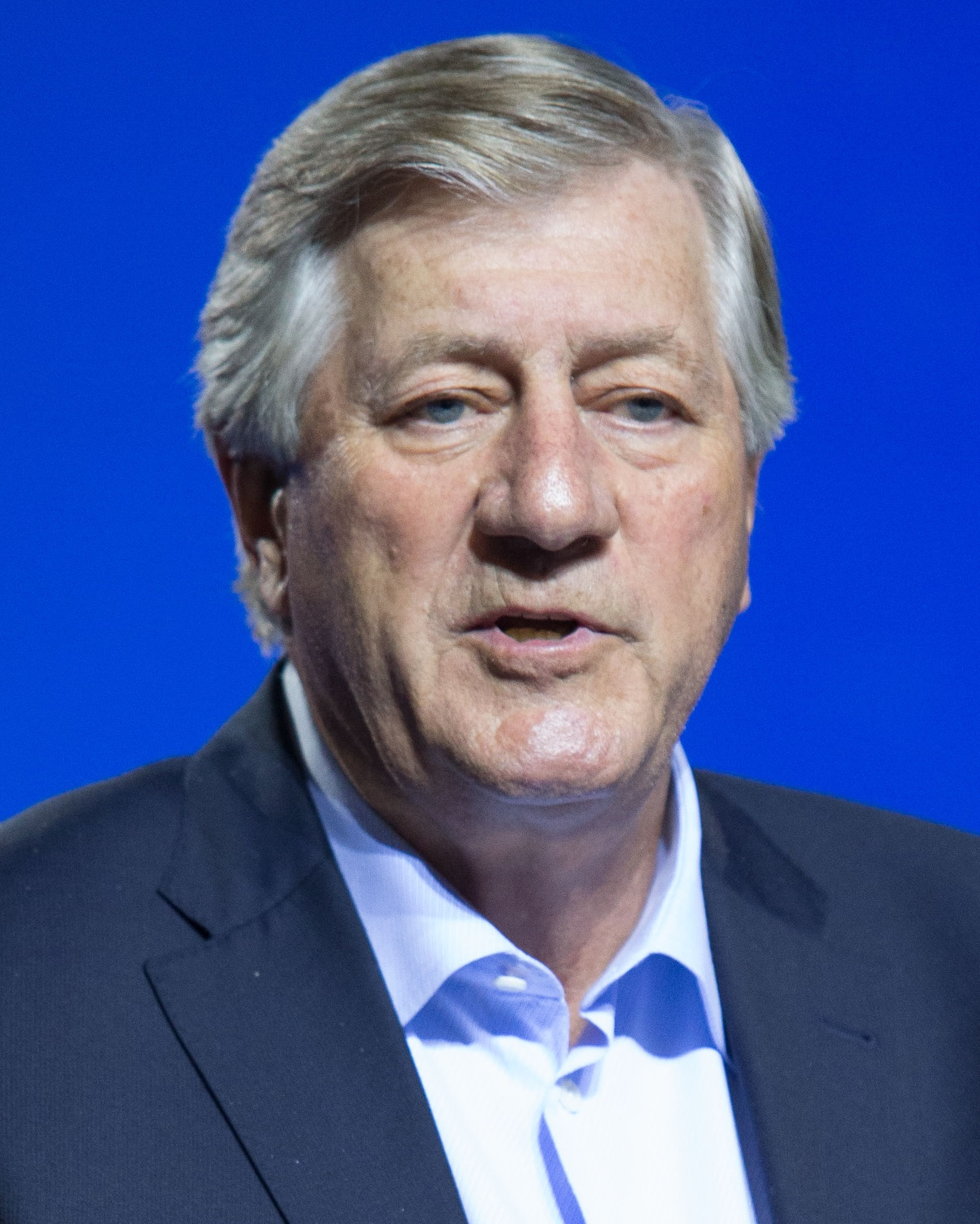
Ontario's 22nd Premier Mike Harris

In the 1995 election, Harris catapulted his party from third place to an election victory, running on a small government platform called the "Common Sense Revolution". The platform promised tax cuts (including 30% cuts to provincial personal income tax), and adopted wedge issues including deficit reduction, welfare cuts, the introduction of workfare, and the repeal of an employment equity law Harris characterized as "the quota law."

Public opinion on the Harris government was polarized. The government was criticized on issues such as health care, the environment, education, and social policies. Strikes and protests including a 1997 teacher's strike beleaguered its first term. But it won a second majority in the 1999 general election, and held generally stable support until Harris's departure as party leader in 2002.

A slide in PC support began in early 2000 according to Ipsos-Reid, when the Tories fell behind the Liberals in the public opinion polls for the first time since the 1999 election, with 36% support of those polled, compared to 42% for the Liberals and 17% for the NDP. Later in 2000, Liberal support rose to about half of those polled, while PC support remained in the low 30s. This pattern held through to the 2002 leadership campaign, when PC support rose to 37%, while the Liberals retained the support of about half of those polled.

=== Ernie Eves: distancing the party from Harris and 2003 defeat ===
With the resignation of Mike Harris in 2002, the PCs held a leadership election. Ernie Eves, who had been Harris's minister of finance, and who had the backing of almost all PC members of provincial parliament (MPPs), won the campaign, defeating his successor as minister of finance, Jim Flaherty.

Eves was a Red Tory, unlike Harris. He'd tried to blunt some of the edges of the more radical elements of Harris's platform while in Cabinet. His distancing from the Common Sense Revolution continued after he became premier. He killed plans to sell off Hydro One and re-imposed retail price controls on electricity, capping the price at 4.3 cents per kilowatt-hour, and vowing to keep it capped until at least 2006.

During the summer after Eves's election as leader, the PCs closed the gap in popular support considerably, placing only two percentage points behind the Liberals in two summer public opinion polls. By the autumn of 2002, however, Eves's "honeymoon" with the voters was over, and the party fell back in the polls, hovering in the mid-to-high 30s, while the Liberals scored in the mid-to-high 40s.

Despite his attempt to recast the Tory government as a moderate one, Eves was unable to reverse the slide in the polls the Tories had suffered in the last years of Harris's tenure.

Eves asked Flaherty's campaign chairman, Jaime Watt, to co-manage the PC election campaign, along with the rest of the "Whiz Kids" team that had previously worked for Harris. Only Tom Long, the central organizer in Harris's campaigns, refused to work for Eves.

The "Whiz Kids" reputation for competence was marred by publicity stunts such as handing down his government's second budget at the headquarters of Magna International instead of in the provincial legislature. Voter backlash against this break with parliamentary tradition forced the delay of a planned spring election in 2003.

In May 2003, Eves released the party's platform, "The Road Ahead". The document promoted an aggressive hard-right agenda, and was closer in spirit to Harris and Flaherty's agenda than to Eves's own. In releasing this document, Eves reversed his earlier positions on banning teacher's strikes, jailing the homeless, and private school tax credits. The platform also called for mortgage interest deductibility.

The PC election campaign was riddled with mistakes and miscues, and Eves appeared uncomfortable trying to sell a platform he had opposed only a year earlier. In contrast, the Liberals had spent the last four years positioning themselves as the government in waiting, and ran on the simple platform of "Choose Change". PC television ads which attacked Liberal leader Dalton McGuinty as "still not up to the job" were received poorly by the voting public, and allowed the Liberal campaign to portray the Tories as needlessly confrontational.

A critical point in the campaign was when a member of the Eves team jokingly referred to McGuinty as an "evil reptilian kitten-eater from another planet", a comment that made the Tories appear desperate to vilify their opponents. In the final days leading up to the vote, Eves was further criticized for saying that McGuinty just says "whatever comes into his pointy little head". On election day, the Tories were routed, falling to 24 seats.

=== 2003 to 2018: in Opposition ===
==== 2004 to 2009: John Tory ====
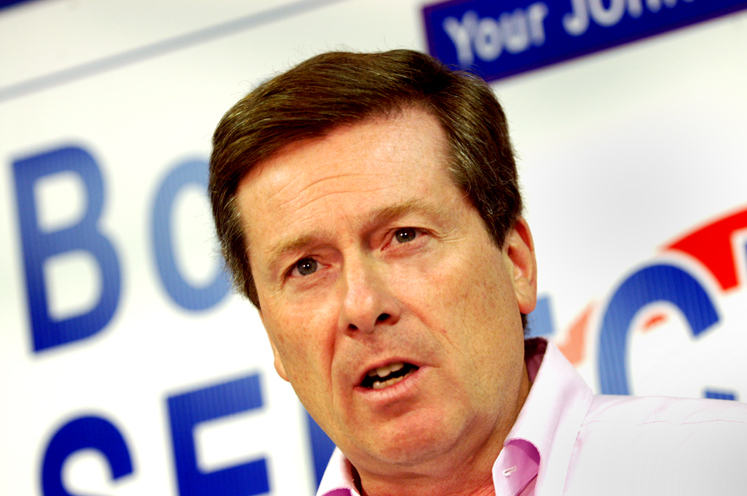
John Tory, leader (2004–2009)

Ontario PC logo, 2006–2010

In early 2004, Eves announced his intention to step down as leader. A leadership convention to replace him was called for the fall.

Jim Flaherty was the first to enter the race, campaigning on the same right-wing platform as in 2002. He was soon opposed by John Tory, a former executive with Rogers Cable and a Toronto mayoral candidate in 2003 (a position he would ultimately win in 2014), sometimes viewed as a Red Tory due to his association to former premier Bill Davis. MPP Frank Klees, the third candidate in the race, was a supporter of the Common Sense Revolution and campaigned for a two-tier healthcare system.

The 2004 leadership election was held on September 18, 2004, electing John Tory as the party's new leader. Tory, who had first worked as an aide to Premier Bill Davis, was elected to the Ontario legislature in a by-election in March 2005, in the seat that Eves held.

In polling prior to the 2007 general election, the PCs' support rose after the first Liberal budget in 2004. The party was virtually tied with the Liberals, as Tory has experimented with several different orientations. During his first year as leader, Tory attempted to rise above partisan politics, openly contemptuous of partisan moves and pledging to improve decorum in the legislature. In his second year as leader, Tory adopted a more traditional approach to the issues, sharply opposing the Liberal plans on taxes, spending, deficits and cuts. Heading into the election year, Tory put most of his emphasis on criticizing the government's handling of a standoff with Mohawk aboriginals in Caledonia to portray the government as weak. He also emphasized traditional right-wing issues like taxes, crime and government spending.

During the 2006 PC Policy Convention, Tory introduced his plan for shaping up the PCs' platform for the 2007 election campaign. His ideas were stated in what have been called "The White Papers".

The party experienced a drop in popularity, however, after Tory pledged to provide government funding for faith-based schools. The proposal, which proved to be unpopular with voters, contributed largely to the party's loss. The Liberals won a second majority government, and the PCs made negligible gains in the legislature (one more seat, but a 3 per cent drop in the popular vote). Tory, who had left his Dufferin–Peel–Wellington–Grey seat to run in Don Valley West, would lose to Liberal incumbent Kathleen Wynne.

As a result of the election loss, the party decided to hold a leadership review vote at its 2008 General Party Meeting in London. The Ontario PC Party's constitution requires that the party hold a leadership review vote at the first party convention after an election defeat.

From the election day until the 2008 General Meeting, party members were divided into two "camps": those who supported John Tory's position as party leader and those who opposed his leadership. Several campaigns to oust John Tory as leader of the party, most notably by a party activist group led by former party president Rueben Devlin called Grassroots PC. John Tory had the public support of the PC legislative caucus, and most notably, support from former premiers and predecessors Ernie Eves and Bill Davis.

The lead-up to the review vote was marked by high emotions on both sides of the debate and allegations of rule breaking. Such allegations were risen when caucus members sent letters on party letterhead seeking support for Tory. The letters signed by Tory MPPs Bob Runciman and Toby Barrett were a clear violation of the rules of the party, as the party in general is supposed to be neutral on the leadership review question. Tory responded by stating that he and his supporters will reimburse the party for the letters that the caucus members had sent in support of Tory's position as leaders. As a result, the party's president, Blair McCreadie, had stated that the matter is closed. A supporter of Tory's, PC Youth President Andrew Brander, launched a series of last-minute challenges of delegates on the grounds that they are representing ridings where they neither live nor work.

Tory received 66.9% support, lower than internal tracking which showed him more comfortably in the 70 per cent range – appeared to come as a shock to Tory. The percentage of support received by Tory was nearly identical to Joe Clark's 1983 support when he was federal PC leader, which resulted in Clark resigning as leader, and is often seen as the benchmark for Canadian party leaders to get to stay on as leader.

Three hours after the leadership review vote, John Tory announced to the delegates at the Ontario PC's general meeting that he would stay on as leader of the Party. Tory came under heavy criticism from several party members following this delay, with his opponents signalling that they would continue to call for an end to what they called his 'weak' leadership. Other party members, such as former Mike Harris's chief of staff Guy Giorno and interim leader of the opposition Bob Runciman, supported John Tory, saying that his opponents should accept the results and move on.

==== 2009 to 2014: Tim Hudak ====
Ontario PC logo 2010–2016

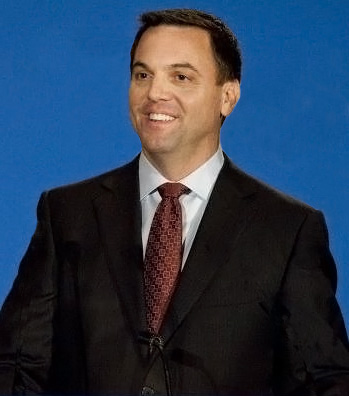
Tim Hudak, Leader 2009–2014

John Tory announced his pending resignation as leader on March 6, 2009; the day following his defeat in a by-election for Haliburton—Kawartha Lakes—Brock. On June 27, 2009, party members elected Tim Hudak as the party's new leader. Christine Elliott, Frank Klees, and Randy Hillier were the unsuccessful candidates.

Hudak led the PCs through two elections. In the 2011 provincial election, the McGuinty Liberal government was reduced to a minority. Hudak's Tories were widely expected to win the 2014 provincial election but the Liberals, now led by Kathleen Wynne, were returned with a majority government largely due to Hudak's campaign pledge to cut 100,000 public service jobs by attrition rather than by layoffs. Hudak resigned in the aftermath. On July 2, 2014, Jim Wilson was chosen by the Progressive Conservative caucus to be its interim leader until the 2015 leadership election.

==== 2015 to 2018: Patrick Brown ====
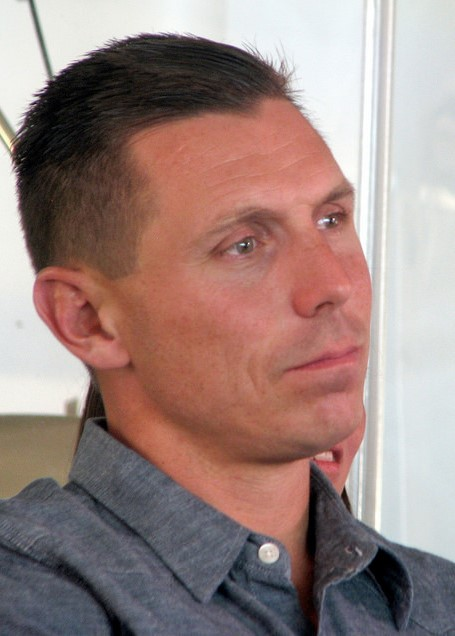
Patrick Brown, Leader 2015–2018

On May 9, 2015, the membership elected Patrick Brown, a federal Conservative MP from Barrie, as the leader of the party. Christine Elliott was the unsuccessful candidate with Vic Fedeli, Lisa MacLeod, and Monte McNaughton withdrawing prior to the vote.

Since he did not hold a seat in the Legislature, the party requested that MPP Garfield Dunlop resign his seat in Simcoe North so that Brown could run. Brown was elected as MPP for Simcoe North in a by-election held September 3, 2015.

Party logo (2016–2018)

At the party's 2016 Annual General Meeting (the first since the leadership election) Brown announced that the PCs would take on a more inclusive and compassionate tone, shifting to the political centre by reach out to groups that do not typically support the party including trade unions, and pursue "sensible" carbon pricing. He also unveiled a new logo to represent the commitment to "inclusion, renewal, openness and change". Brown stated his intention to change the party by moving away from past campaigns where one particular issue often cost them support, such as Tim Hudak's proposed public sector job cuts in the 2014 election or John Tory's proposal to extend public funding to all faith-based schools in 2007.

At the PC's weekend policy convention on November 25, 2017, their "People's Guarantee" platform was released. Brown's platform was described as centrist on many issues, and included proposals such as opting-in to the federal carbon tax "backstop" (while criticizing the Liberal's cap-and-trade system) and providing child care subsidies. Brown's platform also included more traditional PC platform items relating to cutting taxes and user fees, such as a 12 percent reduction in hydro bills, cutting "middle-class taxes by 22 per cent", and a commitment to balancing the provincial budget. Brown also attempted to distance himself from socially conservative policies, declaring himself pro-choice, and refusing to discuss abortion and gay marriage issues at the policy convention, stating that he believed the "vast majority" of the party was on board with socially progressive policies.

Led by the Campaign Life Coalition, a socially conservative anti-abortion organization that had supported Brown's leadership bid and disapproved of his move to the centre a breakaway party called "Ontario Alliance" was formed to represent disaffected social conservatives. Similarly, the Trillium Party of Ontario aimed to represent conservative libertarians who have been left out. In particular, Brown expelled Carleton—Mississippi Mills MPP and former Ontario Land Association president Jack MacLaren out of the party after he made negative disparaging comments about Francophone language rights. MacLaren subsequently crossed the floor to become the Trillium Party's first member in the Ontario Legislature. As well, some conservatives in Northern Ontario who have felt unrepresented by the Tories and alienated by the party leadership have joined the Northern Ontario Party.

On January 24, 2018, Brown was accused by two women of engaging in sexual misconduct. Brown denied the allegations and initially refused to step down. After pressure from within the party caucus, including calls for his resignation by deputy PC leaders Sylvia Jones and Steve Clark, he resigned as leader in the early hours of January 25, with some aspects of the allegations later proving to be false or unconfirmed.

==== 2018: Vic Fedeli ====
With Brown's resignation occurring less than five months before the next provincial election, the party executive met on January 25, 2018, to determine whether to have the next Progressive Conservative Party of Ontario leadership election before the provincial election, and if so how it will proceed, or whether to have the interim leader lead the party into the election. Vic Fedeli, Nipissing MPP and former mayor of North Bay, was chosen as interim leader by caucus on January 26, 2018. The Party held a leadership convention on March 10, 2018.

Fedeli's first major task as interim leader was to investigate the allegations of questionable spending on lawsuits and unsubstantiated favours to allies during Brown's tenure. Party president Rick Dykstra resigned on January 28, 2018. He indicated that it was time for "someone else to lead us through the hard work". Shortly afterwards, Maclean's magazine revealed allegations of sexual assault against Dykstra, stemming from a 2014 incident when Dykstra was a federal MP. Several other key party and campaign staffers were dismissed or their positions eliminated due to a "reorganization" in the days after Brown's resignation.

=== 2018 to present: Doug Ford government ===
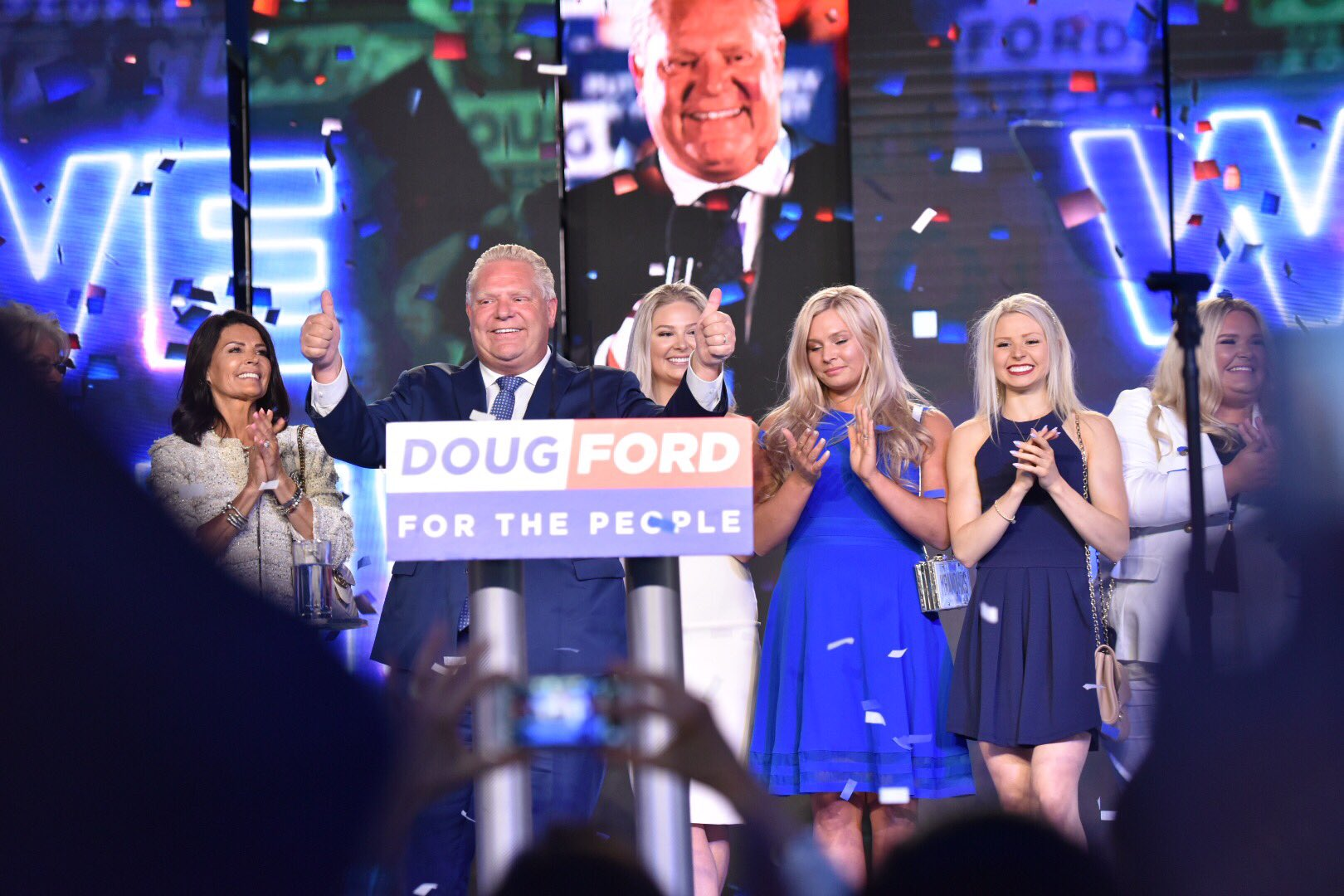
Doug Ford, Leader 2018–present

On March 10, 2018, former Toronto city councillor Doug Ford, the brother of the late former mayor of Toronto Rob Ford and son of the late former MPP Doug Ford Sr., was elected as leader of the PC Party, narrowly defeating runner-up Christine Elliott on the third ballot with 50.6% of allocated points, although Elliot had more votes. Due to not having a seat in the legislature, Ford chose to have Vic Fedeli remain as leader of the opposition before the 2018 election.

On June 7, 2018, Ford led the PCs to a majority government. The Tories won 76 of 124 seats and 40.5% of the vote.

In the 2022 Ontario general election, Ford led the PCs to another victory, winning with an increased majority.

In early 2025, Ford called for an early snap election; he led the party to a historic third victory, winning with a slightly decreased majority.

== Ideology and principles ==
=== Ideology ===
The Ontario PC Party is a centre-right, and right-wing conservative political party. In recent years, the PC Party has repeatedly campaigned on the following policies:

==== Economic regulation ====
- Allowing private retailers to sell alcohol and cannabis
- Streamlining regulations
- Opposing calls to ban licensed firearm ownership

==== Education ====
- Adding financial literacy to the curriculum
- Enacting OSAP grant cuts
- Supporting sex education, but allowing parents to opt out of it
- Reducing the power of teachers' unions
- Hiring teachers based on merit and qualifications, rather than seniority
- Abolishing the Ontario College of Trades

==== Healthcare ====
- Supporting Ontario's universal publicly funded healthcare system
- Hiring more healthcare workers
- Allowing privately run healthcare clinics to provide publicly funded healthcare procedures

==== Government spending ====
- Pursuing balanced budgets during times of economic growth
- Opposing the implementation of a universal basic income and "no strings attached" welfare payments
- Reducing corporate welfare

==== Infrastructure ====
- Construct the Northern Shield oil pipeline from Hardisty, Alberta to Sarnia, Ontario
- Develop the mineral-rich "Ring of Fire" in Northern Ontario
- Funding the construction of more highways and roads
- Funding the construction of public transit
- De-politicizing the approval process for housing construction
- Support the use of hydro electricity and nuclear electricity

==== Law enforcement ====
- Opposing legalization of recreational drugs
- Hiring more police officers and opposing the police abolition movement
- Pursuing longer prison sentences during prosecutions

==== Taxation ====
- Reducing of income taxes
- Reducing of business taxes
- Reducing gasoline taxes and opposing a carbon tax

==== Other issues ====
- Reducing the number of politicians in municipal governments

== Party leaders ==
The party was known as the Liberal-Conservative Association of Ontario from 1867 to 1942, and then as the Progressive Conservative Party of Ontario from 1942 to present.

	Photo	Leader	Years in Office	Note
1		John Sandfield Macdonald	1867–1871	First Premier of Ontario
2		Matthew Crooks Cameron	1871–1878	Leader of the Opposition
3		William Ralph Meredith	1878–1894	Leader of the Opposition. Later Chief Justice of Ontario (1913–1923).
4		George Frederick Marter	1894–1896	Leader of the Opposition
5		Sir James P. Whitney	1896–1914	Premier of Ontario 1905–1914, Leader of the Opposition 1896–1905
6		Sir William Hearst	1914–1919	Premier of Ontario
7		George Howard Ferguson	1919–1930	Premier of Ontario 1923–1930, Leader of the Opposition 1919–1923
8		George Stewart Henry	1930–1936	Premier of Ontario 1930–1934, Leader of the Opposition 1934–1938.
9		William Earl Rowe	1936–1938	Concurrently served as a federal Conservative MP. Henry continued as Leader of the Opposition as Rowe did not have a seat in the legislature. Remained a federal MP until 1963. Served as Lieutenant Governor of Ontario 1963–1968.
10		George Drew	1938–1948	Premier of Ontario 1943–1948. Leader of the Opposition 1939–1943. Resigned as Premier to become leader of the federal Progressive Conservative Party and federal Leader of the Opposition (1948–1956). Served as High Commissioner to the United Kingdom (1957–1964)
11		Thomas Kennedy	1948–1949 (interim)	Premier of Ontario. Also Minister of Agriculture (1930–1934, 1943–1953)
12		Leslie Frost	1949–1961	Premier of Ontario, 1949–1961
13		John Robarts	1961–1971	Premier of Ontario, 1961–1971
14		Bill Davis	1971–1985	Premier of Ontario, 1971–1985
15		Frank Miller	1985	Premier of Ontario, 1985
16		Larry Grossman	1985–1987	Leader of the Opposition
17		Andy Brandt	1987–1990 (interim)	Leader of the third party
18		Mike Harris	1990–2002	Premier of Ontario, 1995–2002
19		Ernie Eves	2002–2004	Premier of Ontario 2002–2003, Leader of the Opposition 2003–2004
20		John Tory	2004–2009	Leader of the Opposition 2005–2007, later Mayor of Toronto (2014–2023)
21		Bob Runciman	2009 (interim)	Leader of the Opposition. Later a Senator (2010–2017)
22		Tim Hudak	2009–2014	Leader of the Opposition
23		Jim Wilson	2014–2015 (interim)	Leader of the Opposition
24		Patrick Brown	2015–2018	Leader of the Opposition. Later Mayor of Brampton, Ontario (2018–present)
25		Vic Fedeli	2018 (interim)	Leader of the Opposition
26		Doug Ford	2018–present	Premier of Ontario, 2018–present

== Party presidents ==
President		Years in office	Notes
1	Alexander David (A.D.) McKenzie	1943–1960	Lawyer by profession, McKenzie was the long-time president of the Ontario Progressive Conservative Association and chairman of the party's organizational committee, and full-time party organizer (1942–1960), until his death, and oversaw the party's rise to power and its 6 general election and 20 by-election victories during his tenure.
2	Elmer D. Bell	1960–1968	Lawyer based in Exeter, Ontario. Later appointed chairman of the Ontario Police Commission Bell succeeded McKenzie as party president while Hugh Latimer was appointed to the position of chairman, which had responsibilities of being a full-time party organizer, and was replaced in that role by former MPP Ernie Jackson when John Robarts became party leader.
3	Alan Eagleson	1968–1976	MPP 1963–1967, lawyer, executive director of the NHLPA 1967–1991
4	Gerald (Geri) Nori	1976–1980	Sault Ste. Marie-based lawyer
5	David McFadden	1980–1986	MPP 1985–1987
6	Tom Long	1986–1989	Executive assistant in the PMO 1984–1986, election co-chair and party advisor. Ran for Canadian Alliance leadership in 2000.
7	Kay Weatherall	1989–1990	Retiree
8	Tony Clement	1990–1992	Ontario MPP and provincial cabinet minister 1995–2003; federal MP (2006–2019) and cabinet minister 2006–2015
9	Steve Gilchrist	1992–1994	Ontario MPP and provincial cabinet minister 1995-2003
10	Peter Van Loan	1994–1998	Federal MP (2004-2018) and cabinet minister (2006-2015)
11	Rueben Devlin	1998–2002	President of Humber River Regional Hospital
12	Blair McCreadie	2002–2008	Partner, Dentons LLP
13	Ken Zeise	2008–2012	Principal Consultant, Dominion Group Benefits Limited, group.ca
14	Richard Ciano	2012–2016	market researcher, strategist and pollster
15	Rick Dykstra	2016–2018	federal MP 2006–2015, resigned following allegations of sexual misconduct.
16	Jag Badwal	2018	Mississauga-based real estate agent, became president after Dykstra's resignation.
17	Brian Patterson	2018–2022	40-year activist within the Ontario PC Party.
18	Michael Diamond	2022–present	

== Election results ==
Election	Leader	Votes	%	Seats	+/−	Position	Status
1867	John Sandfield Macdonald	80,111	50.3	41 / 82(50%)	▲41	▲1st	Coalition
1871	John Sandfield Macdonald	59,926	45.9	38 / 82(46%)	▼3	▼2nd	Opposition
1875	Matthew Crooks Cameron	89,355	46.8	34 / 88(39%)	▼4	2nd	Opposition
1879	William Ralph Meredith	118,513	47.8	29 / 88(33%)	▼5	2nd	Opposition
1883	William Ralph Meredith	120,853	46.6	37 / 88(42%)	▲8	2nd	Opposition
1886	William Ralph Meredith	148,969	47.0	32 / 90(36%)	▼5	2nd	Opposition
1890	William Ralph Meredith	130,289	39.9	34 / 91(37%)	▲2	2nd	Opposition
1894	William Ralph Meredith	104,369	27.8	23 / 94(24%)	▼9	2nd	Opposition
1898	James P. Whitney	204,011	47.7	42 / 94(45%)	▲19	2nd	Opposition
1902	James P. Whitney	215,883	49.7	48 / 98(49%)	▲6	2nd	Opposition
1905	James P. Whitney	237,612	53.4	69 / 98(70%)	▲21	1st	Majority
1908	James P. Whitney	246,324	54.7	86 / 106(81%)	▲17	1st	Majority
1911	James P. Whitney	205,338	55.6	82 / 106(77%)	▼4	1st	Majority
1914	James P. Whitney	268,548	55.3	84 / 111(76%)	▲1	1st	Majority
1919	William Howard Hearst	403,655	34.9	25 / 111(23%)	▼59	▼3rd	Third party
1923	George Howard Ferguson	473,819	49.8	75 / 111(68%)	▲50	▲1st	Majority
1926	George Howard Ferguson	640,515	57.6	72 / 112(64%)	▼3	1st	Majority
1929	George Howard Ferguson	574,730	58.8	90 / 112(80%)	▲18	1st	Majority
1934	George S. Henry	621,218	39.8	17 / 90(19%)	▼73	▼2nd	Opposition
1937	William Earl Rowe	619,610	40.0	23 / 90(26%)	▲6	2nd	Opposition
1943	George Drew	469,672	35.7	38 / 90(42%)	▲15	▲1st	Minority
1945	George Drew	781,345	44.3	66 / 90(73%)	▲28	1st	Majority
1948	George Drew	725,799	41.5	53 / 90(59%)	▼13	1st	Majority
1951	Leslie Frost	860,939	48.5	79 / 90(88%)	▲26	1st	Majority
1955	Leslie Frost	846,592	48.5	83 / 98(85%)	▲4	1st	Majority
1959	Leslie Frost	868,815	46.3	71 / 98(72%)	▼12	1st	Majority
1963	John Robarts	1,052,740	48.9	77 / 108(71%)	▲6	1st	Majority
1967	John Robarts	1,018,755	42.3	69 / 117(59%)	▼8	1st	Majority
1971	Bill Davis	1,465,313	44.5	78 / 117(67%)	▲9	1st	Majority
1975	Bill Davis	1,192,592	36.1	51 / 125(41%)	▼27	1st	Minority
1977	Bill Davis	1,322,723	39.7	58 / 125(46%)	▲7	1st	Minority
1981	Bill Davis	1,412,488	44.4	70 / 125(56%)	▲12	1st	Majority
1985	Frank Miller	1,343,044	37.0	52 / 125(42%)	▼18	1st	Minority
1985	Frank Miller	1,343,044	37.0	52 / 125(42%)	▼18	1st	Opposition (Note: Won most seats in 1985 election, but lost power after Liberals signed a pact with the NDP to form the government.)
1987	Larry Grossman	931,473	24.7	16 / 130(12%)	▼36	▼3rd	Third Party
1990	Mike Harris	944,564	23.5	20 / 130(15%)	▲4	3rd	Third Party
1995	Mike Harris	1,870,110	44.8	82 / 130(63%)	▲62	▲1st	Majority
1999	Mike Harris	1,978,059	45.1	59 / 103(57%)	▼23	1st	Majority
2003	Ernie Eves	1,559,181	34.7	24 / 103(23%)	▼35	▼2nd	Opposition
2007	John Tory	1,398,857	31.6	26 / 107(24%)	▲2	2nd	Opposition
2011	Tim Hudak	1,527,959	35.4	37 / 107(35%)	▲11	2nd	Opposition
2014	Tim Hudak	1,506,267	31.2	28 / 107(26%)	▼9	2nd	Opposition
2018	Doug Ford	2,324,742	40.5	76 / 124(61%)	▲48	▲1st	Majority
2022	Doug Ford	1,912,057	40.8	83 / 124(67%)	▲7	1st	Majority
2025	Doug Ford	2,158,452	43.0	80 / 124(65%)	▼3	1st	Majority

== See also ==
- Official Opposition Shadow Cabinet of the 40th Legislative Assembly of Ontario
- List of Ontario general elections
- List of premiers of Ontario
- List of leaders of the opposition in Ontario
- List of political parties in Canada
- List of political parties in Ontario
- Ontario PC Youth Association
- Ontario PC Campus Association
