= Steve Clark (Canadian politician) =

Ontario Progressive Conservative (born 1960)

The Honourable Steve Clark ECO MPP
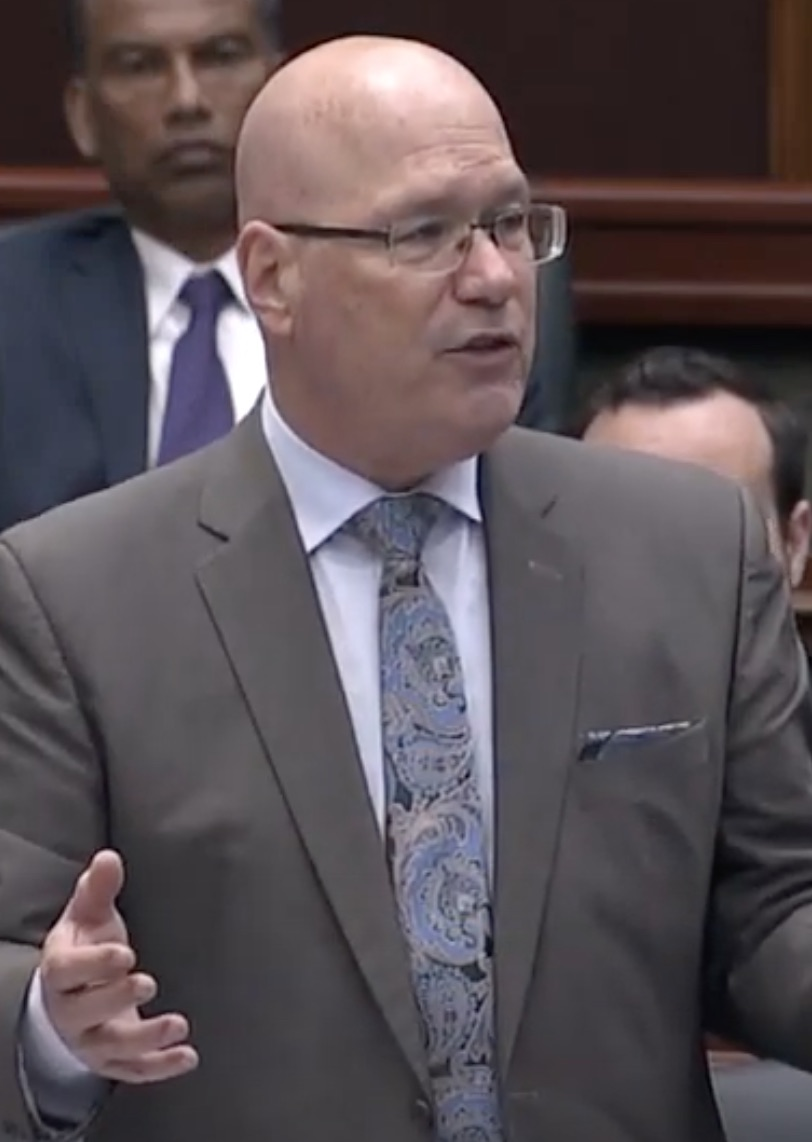
- Clark in 2020

Ontario Government House Leader
- Incumbent
- Assumed office June 6, 2024
- Premier: Doug Ford
- Preceded by: Paul Calandra

Ontario Minister of Municipal Affairs and Housing
- In office June 29, 2018 – September 4, 2023
- Premier: Doug Ford
- Preceded by: Bill Mauro; Peter Milczyn
- Succeeded by: Paul Calandra

Member of the Ontario Provincial Parliament for Leeds—Grenville—Thousand Islands and Rideau Lakes Leeds—Grenville (2010-2018)
- Incumbent
- Assumed office March 4, 2010
- Preceded by: Bob Runciman

Mayor of Brockville
- In office 1982–1991

Personal details
- Born: Stephen J. Clark; November 7, 1960 (age 66) Brockville, Ontario, Canada
- Party: Progressive Conservative
- Occupation: Politician

Stephen J. Clark (born November 7, 1960) is a Canadian politician who has represented Leeds—Grenville—Thousand Islands and Rideau Lakes in the Legislative Assembly of Ontario since 2010. A member of the Progressive Conservative (PC) Party, Clark was the minister of municipal affairs and housing from 2018 until 2023, when he resigned from provincial cabinet amid the Greenbelt scandal. Clark was mayor of Brockville from 1982 to 1991. Today, Clark is the Commissioner of the Board of Internal Economy, Government House Leader, and Parliamentary Assistant to the Premier.

== Personal life ==
Clark was born in Brockville, Ontario, on November 7, 1960. He lives in Brockville with his wife Deanna.

== Municipal politics ==
Clark served three terms as mayor of Brockville from 1982 to 1991. First elected at age 22, he was the youngest mayor in Canada at the time. He was also president of the Association of Municipalities of Ontario. He later worked as an advertising salesman for the Brockville Recorder and Times, as an administrative assistant to Bob Runciman, and as the chief administrative officer for the township of Leeds and the Thousand Islands.

== Provincial politics ==
He was first elected as the MPP for Leeds–Grenville in a by-election on March 4, 2010, held to replace Bob Runciman who resigned to accept a position in the Canadian Senate. He was easily re-elected in 2011 and in 2014 both with large pluralities. In 2018, he was elected as the MPP for the riding of Leeds–Grenville–Thousands Islands and Rideau Lakes. In 2018, he was appointed as the Minister of Municipal Affairs and Housing by Premier Doug Ford. He resigned this position on September 4, 2023.

In January 2019, Clark proposed changes to the Greater Golden Horseshoe Growth Plan.

Clark introduced the Municipal Modernization Program in March 2019 to improve local service delivery and efficiency in 405 small and rural municipalities in Ontario. He also developed the Audit and Accountability Fund to help the larger 39 municipalities and three school boards to conduct independent, financial reviews. To bolster municipal modernization efforts, Clark announced additional funding for municipalities in March 2020 to find ways to lower costs and improve services for residents and businesses as well as streamline development processes to increase the supply of housing.

In July 2020, during the COVID-19 pandemic, Clark announced alongside Premier Doug Ford the historic one-time emergency $4 billion Safe Restart Agreement with the federal government. As a result of the COVID-19 outbreak, municipalities experienced unprecedented cashflow and financial pressures from decreased revenues and increased service delivery costs. The Safe Restart Agreement funding will flow directly to municipalities to help them deal with COVID-19 related pressures, maintain critical services and protect vulnerable people as the province safely and gradually re-opened.

During the COVID-19 pandemic, Clark worked closely with municipal partners across Ontario and introduced the COVID-19 Economic Recovery Act (Bill 197), which received Royal Assent on July 21, 2020.

Clark resigned from cabinet during the 2023 Greenbelt scandal, after a report from the Ontario integrity commissioner recommended Clark be reprimanded for not properly overseeing the process to select lands for housing development.

== Electoral record ==
2025 Ontario general election: Leeds—Grenville—Thousand Islands and Rideau Lakes
Party	Candidate	Votes	%	±%
Progressive Conservative	Steve Clark	25,118	55.12	–2.57
Liberal	Lorna Jean Edmonds	12,392	27.19	+9.07
New Democratic	Chris Wilson	4,489	9.85	–3.72
Green	Fiona Jager	1,926	4.23	–1.82
New Blue	Chris Garrah	743	1.63	–0.58
Ontario Party	Daniel Calabretta	561	1.23	–0.02
Libertarian	Mark Snow	342	0.75	+0.28
Total valid votes		45,571	99.19	
Total rejected, unmarked and declined ballots		373	0.81	+0.28
Turnout		45,944	51.25	+2.07
Eligible voters		89,653		
Progressive Conservative hold		Swing		–5.82
Source: Elections Ontario

2022 Ontario general election: Leeds—Grenville—Thousand Islands and Rideau Lakes
Party	Candidate	Votes	%	±%	Expenditures
Progressive Conservative	Steve Clark	24,657	57.69	–3.58	$47,254
Liberal	Josh Bennett	7,746	18.12	+4.76	$12,806
New Democratic	Chris Wilson	5,799	13.57	–6.22	$4,797
Green	Fiona Jager	2,583	6.04	+1.25	$5,669
New Blue	Daniel Kitsch	944	2.21	–	$2,785
Ontario Party	Glenn L. Malcolm	536	1.25	–	$0
Libertarian	Mark Snow	202	0.47	–0.32	$84
People's Front	Stephen Ireland	189	0.44	–	$651
Populist	Dave Senger	88	0.21	–	$2,415
Total valid votes/expense limit		42,744	99.47	–	$122,329
Total rejected, unmarked and declined ballots		227	0.53	–0.91	
Turnout		42,971	49.18	–11.04	
Eligible voters		87,378			
Progressive Conservative hold		Swing		–4.17	
Source: Elections Ontario

2018 Ontario general election: Leeds—Grenville—Thousand Islands and Rideau Lakes
Party	Candidate	Votes	%	±%
Progressive Conservative	Steve Clark	30,002	61.27	+5.20
New Democratic	Michelle Taylor	9,688	19.78	+2.38
Liberal	David Henderson	6,543	13.36	–7.13
Green	Derek Morley	2,347	4.79	–0.10
Libertarian	Bill Buckley	389	0.79	–0.34
Total valid votes		48,969	98.56	
Total rejected, unmarked and declined ballots		716	1.44	+0.23
Turnout		49,685	60.22	+7.36
Eligible voters		82,511		
Progressive Conservative hold		Swing		+1.41
Source: Elections Ontario

2014 Ontario general election: Leeds—Grenville
Party	Candidate	Votes	%	±%
Progressive Conservative	Steve Clark	23,253	56.07	–7.53
Liberal	Christine Milks	8,499	20.49	+3.06
New Democratic	David Lundy	7,219	17.41	+2.18
Green	Stephen Bowering	2,030	4.89	+1.44
Libertarian	Harold Gabriel	471	1.14	–
Total valid votes		41,472	98.79	
Total rejected, unmarked and declined ballots		507	1.21	+0.80
Turnout		41,979	52.86	+2.22
Eligible voters		79,415		
Progressive Conservative hold		Swing		–5.30
Source: Elections Ontario

2011 Ontario general election: Leeds—Grenville
Party	Candidate	Votes	%	±%	Expenditures
Progressive Conservative	Steve Clark	24,314	63.60	–3.08	$52,598.00
Liberal	Ray Heffernan	6,663	17.43	–2.65	$17,512.99
New Democratic	David Lundy	5,822	15.23	+10.12	$13,274.26
Green	Charlie Taylor	1,319	3.45	–4.22	$3,731.20
Socialist	Lance Fulsom	111	0.29	–	$0.00
Total valid votes/expense limit		38,229	99.60	–	$90,198.43
Total rejected, unmarked and declined ballots		155	0.40	+0.09	
Turnout		38,384	50.64	+14.03	
Eligible voters		75,797			
Progressive Conservative hold		Swing		–0.22	
Source: Elections Ontario

Ontario provincial by-election, March 4, 2010: Leeds—Grenville Resignation of Bob Runciman, called to the Senate of Canada
Party	Candidate	Votes	%	±%	Expenditures
Progressive Conservative	Steve Clark	18,510	66.68	+10.44	$27,511.00
Liberal	Stephen Mazurek	5,573	20.08	–8.60	$65,190.41
Green	Neil Kudrinko	2,130	7.67	+0.49	$14,799.66
New Democratic	Steve Armstrong	1,417	5.10	–1.87	$17,118.89
Libertarian	Anthony Giles	129	0.46	–	$297.56
Total valid votes		27,759	99.69		
Total rejected, unmarked and declined ballots		87	0.31	–0.16	
Turnout		27,846	36.61	–18.50	
Eligible voters		76,053			
Progressive Conservative hold		Swing		+9.52	
Source: Elections Ontario

=== Cabinet posts ===
Ford ministry, Province of Ontario (2018–present)
Cabinet post (1)
Predecessor	Office	Successor
Bill Mauro (Municipal Affairs); Peter Milczyn (Housing)	Minister of Municipal Affairs and Housing; June 29, 2018–September 4, 2023	Paul Calandra
