= Nepean (provincial electoral district) =

Provincial electoral district in Ontario, Canada

Coordinates: 45.275°N 75.758°W

Ontario electoral district
- Nepean in relation to other electoral districts in Ottawa

Provincial electoral district
- Legislature: Legislative Assembly of Ontario
MPP
Tyler Watt
Liberal
- District created: 1987
- First contested: 1987
- Last contested: 2025

Demographics
- Population (2016): 119,115
- Electors (2018): 90,987
- Area (km²): 173
- Pop. density (per km²): 688.5
- Census division: Ottawa
- Census subdivision: Ottawa

Nepean is a provincial electoral district that has existed from 1987 to 1999, and again since 2018. The riding was re-created federally with the 2012 redistribution process. That same process was followed by the Ontario government, meaning the provincial ridings follow a similar boundary division for the 2018 provincial election.

== Riding history ==
Nepean was created in 1987 out of part of Carleton. It was represented by a Liberal MPP for eight years before it was won by then 25-year-old Progressive Conservative John Baird. Baird represented Nepean for four years. In 1999, the provincial redistribution resulted in Nepean being abolished as it was split between the new Ottawa West—Nepean and Nepean—Carleton ridings.

=== 2018 return ===
Provincial law has required that southern Ontario's electoral boundaries have the same boundaries provincially and federally. The federal boundaries were redistributed in 2012 in time for the 2015 federal election, meaning Ontario's first provincial election under the new boundaries was the 2018 election.

=== Members of Provincial Parliament ===
Nepean
| Assembly | Years | Member | Party |
|---|---|---|---|
| 34th | 1987–1990 | Hans Daigeler | Liberal |
| 35th | 1990–1995 | Hans Daigeler | Liberal |
| 36th | 1995–1999 | John Baird | Progressive Conservative |
Riding dissolved into Nepean—Carleton and Ottawa West—Nepean
Riding re-created from Nepean—Carleton
| 42nd | 2018–2022 | Lisa MacLeod | Progressive Conservative |
| 43rd | 2022–2025 | Lisa MacLeod | Progressive Conservative |
| 44th | 2025–present | Tyler Watt | Liberal |

== Electoral results ==
=== Nepean, 2018–Present ===
Winning party in each polling division of Nepean at the 2025 Ontario general election

2025 Ontario general election
| Party | Candidate | Votes | % | ±% |
|---|---|---|---|---|
| Liberal | Tyler Watt | 22,683 | 48.53 | +14.07 |
| Progressive Conservative | Alex Lewis | 17,962 | 38.43 | –0.83 |
| New Democratic | Max Blair | 4,116 | 8.81 | –10.53 |
| Green | Sheilagh McLean | 885 | 1.89 | –1.99 |
| New Blue | John Kovach | 485 | 1.04 | –1.17 |
| Ontario Party | Carmen Charbonneau | 385 | 0.82 | –0.02 |
| Independent | Peter Westaway | 223 | 0.48 | – |
| Total valid votes | | 46,739 | 99.58 | |
| Total rejected, unmarked and declined ballots | | 196 | 0.42 | –0.15 |
| Turnout | | 46,935 | 45.28 | –0.60 |
| Eligible voters | | 103,654 | | |
| Liberal gain from Progressive Conservative | | Swing | | +7.45 |
Source: Elections Ontario

Winning party in each polling division of Nepean at the 2022 Ontario general election

2022 Ontario general election
| Party | Candidate | Votes | % | ±% | Expenditures |
|---|---|---|---|---|---|
| Progressive Conservative | Lisa MacLeod | 17,123 | 39.26 | –5.87 | $56,906 |
| Liberal | Tyler Watt | 15,029 | 34.46 | +14.85 | $68,470 |
| New Democratic | Brian Double | 8,435 | 19.34 | –9.19 | $5,327 |
| Green | Kaitlyn Tremblay | 1,696 | 3.89 | –1.28 | $381 |
| New Blue | Kathleen Corriveau | 964 | 2.21 | – | $4,503 |
| Ontario Party | Bryan Emmerson | 370 | 0.85 | – | $0 |
| Total valid votes/expense limit | | 43,617 | 99.43 | – | $134,511 |
| Total rejected, unmarked and declined ballots | | 249 | 0.57 | –0.33 | |
| Turnout | | 43,866 | 45.89 | –12.85 | |
| Eligible voters | | 95,599 | | | |
| Progressive Conservative hold | | Swing | | –10.36 | |
Source: Elections Ontario

2018 Ontario general election
| Party | Candidate | Votes | % | ±% |
|---|---|---|---|---|
| Progressive Conservative | Lisa MacLeod | 23,899 | 45.13 | +2.61 |
| New Democratic | Zaff Ansari | 15,110 | 28.53 | +15.49 |
| Liberal | Lovina Srivastava | 10,383 | 19.61 | –16.38 |
| Green | James O'Grady | 2,739 | 5.17 | –0.26 |
| Libertarian | Mark A. Snow | 415 | 0.78 | – |
| None of the Above | Raphael Louis | 351 | 0.66 | – |
| Objective Truth | Derrick Lionel Matthews | 60 | 0.11 | – |
| Total valid votes | | 52,957 | 99.10 | |
| Total rejected, unmarked and declined ballots | | 481 | 0.90 | |
| Turnout | | 53,438 | 58.73 | |
| Eligible voters | | 90,987 | | |
| Progressive Conservative notional hold | | Swing | | –6.44 |
Source: Elections Ontario

2014 general election redistributed results
| Party | Vote | % |
|---|---|---|
| Progressive Conservative | 18,273 | 43.23 |
| Liberal | 15,342 | 36.30 |
| New Democratic | 5,703 | 13.49 |
| Green | 2,328 | 5.51 |
| Others | 623 | 1.47 |

=== Nepean, 1987–1999 ===
1995 Ontario general election
| Party | Candidate | Votes | % | ±% | Expenditures |
|---|---|---|---|---|---|
| Progressive Conservative | John Baird | 17,510 | 49.66 | +19.13 | $40,800.37 |
| Liberal | Hans Daigeler | 13,575 | 38.50 | –3.95 | $45,021.83 |
| New Democratic | John Sullivan | 3,274 | 9.29 | –13.77 | $15,380.57 |
| Green | Frank de Jong | 390 | 1.11 | –1.78 | $0 |
| Natural Law | Brian Ernest Jackson | 259 | 0.73 | – | $0 |
| Freedom | Cathy Frampton | 252 | 0.71 | – | $2,307.70 |
| Total valid votes | | 35,260 | 98.98 | | |
| Total rejected, unmarked and declined ballots | | 363 | 1.02 | +0.04 | |
| Turnout | | 35,623 | 64.97 | +2.05 | |
| Eligible voters | | 54,832 | | | |
| Progressive Conservative gain from Liberal | | Swing | | +11.54 | |
Source: Elections Ontario

1990 Ontario general election
| Party | Candidate | Votes | % | ±% |
|---|---|---|---|---|
| Liberal | Hans Daigeler | 13,723 | 42.45 | –6.01 |
| Progressive Conservative | Doug Collins | 9,870 | 30.53 | –5.30 |
| New Democratic | John D. Raudoy | 7,453 | 23.05 | +7.33 |
| Green | Dan Roy | 933 | 2.89 | – |
| Libertarian | Dan Weiler | 349 | 1.08 | – |
| Total valid votes | | 32,328 | 99.02 | |
| Total rejected, unmarked and declined ballots | | 321 | 0.98 | +0.83 |
| Turnout | | 32,649 | 62.91 | +0.51 |
| Eligible voters | | 51,895 | | |
| Liberal hold | | Swing | | –0.36 |
Source: Elections Ontario

1987 Ontario general election
| Party | Candidate | Votes | % |
|---|---|---|---|
| Liberal | Hans Daigeler | 13,951 | 48.45 |
| Progressive Conservative | Robert C. Mitchell | 10,315 | 35.83 |
| New Democratic | Larry Jones | 4,526 | 15.72 |
| Total valid votes | | 28,792 | 99.85 |
| Total rejected ballots | | 44 | 0.15 |
| Turnout | | 28,836 | 62.40 |
| Eligible voters | | 46,210 | |
| Liberal pickup new district. | | | |
Source: Elections Ontario

== See also ==
- List of Ontario provincial electoral districts
- Canadian provincial electoral districts
