= Martin Cardinal =

Constable Martin Cardinal is an Ottawa Police Service member who sparked national outrage on November 25, 2000, when an amateur video taken by Darcy Peterson from his balcony showed an officer repetitively slamming a handcuffed and restrained female's head on his police cruiser.

== Video and scene of event ==
In November 2000, Darcy Peterson had captured the amateur video from his Centretown balcony on a camcorder that he had purchased the same day. An unknowingly videotaped Martin Cardinal showed up as an assisting officer to a call of a woman causing a disturbance. The woman, Julie Cayer, 38, was found intoxicated and belligerent. She was pepper-sprayed, physically searched, and handcuffed before being left with Constable Cardinal who escorted Ms. Cayer to his police cruiser where the video taken shows Cardinal bending a handcuffed Julie Cayer over, using his right hand to grab her hair and his left hand to grab her jacket near her shoulder. The video then shows Constable Cardinal forcefully slamming Ms. Cayer's head onto his police cruiser.

Nearly six months after the tape was filmed, Darcy Peterson sent the video to The Ottawa Citizen who decided to publish it on the front page of their daily issue for that day. The Citizen had cut frames of the amateur video and expressed shock and awe over the events. When presented with the video, Deputy police chief Larry Hill immediately ordered an investigation and Constable Cardinal was suspended with pay. The video was broadcast nationally throughout Canada where Canadians expressed outrage and shock.

On May 11, 2001, Constable Cardinal was charged with assaulting Cayer under the Criminal Code as well as excessive force and discreditable conduct.

== Conviction and guilty plea ==
The initial court proceeding against Constable Cardinal was in front of Ontario Court Justice Kent Kirkland. Cardinal plead not guilty to the assault charge on Ms. Julie Cayer. Martin Cardinal retained high-profile defence lawyer Michael Edelson. Justice Kent Kirkland found Cardinal guilty of assault against Ms. Cayer. The Crown Attorney asked for an enclosed jail sentence, while Edelson asked for a conditional discharge. Justice Kirkland sentenced Cardinal to a conditional discharge stipulating he perform 100-hours of community service. The Crown Attorney appealed the sentence given to Cardinal on the grounds that it was too lenient. In turn, Cardinal's defense decided to appeal the conviction on the basis that Justice Kirkland had made an error in the reasoning he used to find Cardinal guilty.

Four and half years after the assault and his suspension from the Ottawa Police, Cardinal went now before Ontario Court Justice Peter Griffiths for a second trial. On the eve of this trial, Cardinal decided to plead guilty to the assault charge. Ms. Cayer testified during the first trial that she didn't remember anything from the night of the assault aside from having her head slammed off a police cruiser. Justice Griffiths found Cardinal guilty of the assault and ordered him to 75-hours of community service as part of a conditional discharge.

== Reinstated to the Police Force ==
Nearly five years after the date of assault, and after pleading guilty to assaulting Cayer, Cardinal faced a two-day hearing under the Ontario Police Service Act to determine his future as a police officer. The hearing officer, retired police superintendent Robert Fitches ordered Cardinal be reinstated and ordered him to give up eight days of pay. Then Ottawa Police Chief, Vince Bevan suggested that he wanted Constable Cardinal fired but claimed he had to comply with the Fitches decision. Former Ottawa Police Chief, Brian Ford suggested Vince Bevan had no choice but to bring the troubled officer back.

The reinstatement was highly unpopular with the Ottawa public. An Ottawa Citizen online survey suggested only 19% of readers felt justice was served, while over 49% of readers suggested they felt that Martin Cardinal should face a jail sentence.
