= I'd Rather Be Baking Cookies =

2010 Canadian cookbook

- Author: Lisa MacLeod
- Publication date: 2010

I'd Rather Be Baking Cookies: A Collection of Recipes from Lisa MacLeod and Friends is a cookbook written by Canadian politician Lisa MacLeod, who is the member of the Legislative Assembly of Ontario for Nepean—Carleton. The book contains recipes from members of MacLeod's riding and from members of Canadian federal and provincial conservative political parties.

== Content ==
The cookbook contains recipes supplied by members of MacLeod's constituency, of the Progressive Conservative Party of Ontario (her own party), and of the federal Conservative Party of Canada. The book's recipes include chickpea curry from Jason Kenney (a cabinet minister from Calgary who has the nickname "curry in a hurry"). Minister of National Defence and Member of Parliament from Nova Scotia Peter MacKay supplied a recipe for lobster bisque, while Prime Minister Stephen Harper shared his wife's salsa recipe. The cover features MacLeod dressed like Betty Crocker, holding a tray of cookies.

== Background and title ==
During the 2007 Ontario election, Liberal blogger Warren Kinsella published an altered photograph of MacLeod, John Tory, and Scott Reid listening to Randy Hillier (another Canadian politician) speak. He placed thought bubbles over each of the listeners' heads, with MacLeod's suggesting that she would rather be baking cookies than attending the event. MacLeod, however, was visiting her father at that time, who was ill with cancer. Following backlash from other political candidates, Kinsella issued an apology, and noted that the joke did not go over well with his wife.

The resulting media attention led MacLeod to compile the recipes. Proceeds benefitted her re-election campaign.
