= Brian Ford (police officer) =

Retired chief of the Ottawa Police Service

Chief of the Ottawa-Carleton Regional Police
- In office 1993–2000
- Succeeded by: Vince Bevan

Personal details
- Party: Liberal
- Profession: Police officer
- Police career
- Allegiance: Ottawa
- Department: Ottawa-Carleton Regional Police
- Status: Retired
- Rank: Chief of Police

Brian Ford is a Canadian retired police officer who served as Chief of Police of the Ottawa-Carleton Regional Police from 1993 to 2000.

In 2006, he was a candidate in Nepean—Carleton for the Ontario Liberal Party. He endorsed Bob Chiarelli for Mayor of Ottawa in the 2022 Ottawa municipal election.

== Electoral history ==
Ontario provincial by-election, March 30, 2006: Nepean—Carleton
Party	Candidate	Votes	%	±%	Expenditures
Progressive Conservative	Lisa MacLeod	17,312	57.57	+3.51	$ 89,547.03
Liberal	Brian Ford	9,455	31.44	−4.21	58,560.17
New Democratic	Laurel Gibbons	2,487	8.27	+1.73	32,687.68
Green	Peter V. Tretter	634	2.11	−1.65	852.94
Independent	John Turmel	112	0.37		0.00
Freedom	Jurgen Vollrath	73	0.24		0.00
Total valid votes/expense limit		30,073	100.0	−48.65	$ 114,226.16
Total rejected ballots		97	0.32	−0.13	
Turnout		30,170	28.52	−33.71	
Eligible voters		105,802		+11.91	
Source(s) "By-Election 2006 – Summary of Valid Ballots Cast for Each Candidate". Elections Ontario. March 30, 2006. "By-Election 2006 – Poll by Poll Results". Elections Ontario. "CR-1 Campaign Returns". Elections Ontario.
