= Vernon White (politician) =

Canadian senator

The Honourable Vernon White
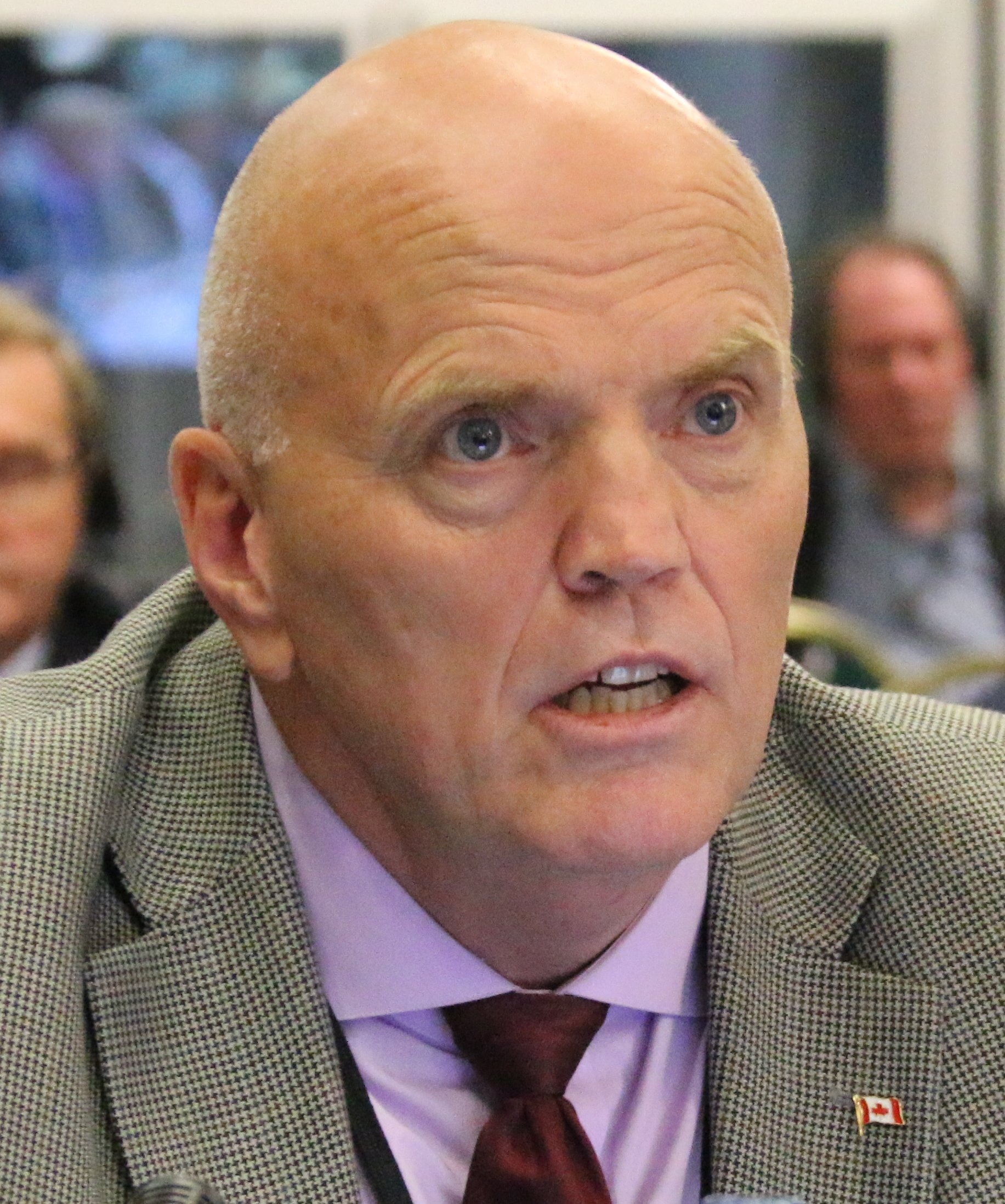
- White in September 2016

Canadian Senator from Ontario
- In office February 20, 2012 – October 2, 2022
- Nominated by: Stephen Harper
- Appointed by: David Johnston

Chief of the Ottawa Police Service
- In office May 22, 2007 – February 20, 2012
- Preceded by: Vince Bevan
- Succeeded by: Charles Bordeleau

Personal details
- Born: Vernon Darryl White; February 21, 1959 (age 67) New Waterford, Nova Scotia, Canada
- Party: Canadian Senators Group (since 2019)
- Other political affiliations: Conservative (2012–2019)
- Education: Acadia University (BA); Royal Roads University (MA); Charles Sturt University (DPL)

Vernon Darryl White (born February 21, 1959) is a Canadian former member of the Senate of Canada and former chief of the Ottawa Police Service.

== Education ==
White holds a professional doctorate degree in police leadership from Charles Sturt University, a Master of Arts degree in conflict studies from Royal Roads University, a Bachelor of Arts degree in sociology and psychology from Acadia University, and a diploma in Business Administration.

== Police career ==
Before becoming chief of police for the Durham Regional Police Service, he served 24 years in the ranks of the Royal Canadian Mounted Police, including as Assistant Commissioner for Information and Identification, in the Ottawa region. White also has experience in various communities across Canada, spending nearly 19 years in northern Canada where he served as the Commanding Officer of Nunavut in his last northern posting. As chief, he was responsible for community law enforcement in Canada's national capital city. He had been chief of police for the Durham Regional Police Service and succeeded Vince Bevan on May 22, 2007.

While chief he received a number of community awards including the Just One Person award and the Community Builder of the Year award.

== Political career ==
On January 6, 2012, Prime Minister Stephen Harper announced White's appointment to the Senate; his appointment came into effect on February 20, 2012, in order to allow him to complete his term as Ottawa police chief. Like the other senators appointed at the time, White pledged to support the government's efforts on senate reform. White said that, even if term limits were not enacted, he would step down voluntarily after nine years (no later than February 20, 2021).

On November 4, 2019, Senator White joined the Canadian Senators Group and, since the CSG, like the ISG requires non-partisanship and refraining from all political party activities, left the Conservative Party of Canada.

In January 2021, White confirmed that he travelled to Finland to visit his spouse's parents on December 28, 2020, contrary to public health advice to avoid international travel amid the COVID-19 pandemic in Canada. White said that he was quarantining for 10 days and getting two COVID-19 tests per Finland's pandemic guidelines.

In June 2021, it was reported that while White was the Chief of the Ottawa Police Service (OPS), Const. Kimberly Cadarette brought directly to White's attention sexual harassment and bullying occurring against her by other members of the OPS. In response, Cadarette said the manager of health and safety and a recruiter informed her that the chief wanted her firearm to be taken away and for her to be put on desk duty until she was evaluated by a psychologist. They told Cadarette her handgun was being removed from her locker as they spoke. She was ordered to see a person who was later revealed to be impersonating Dr. Ron Frey, a certified psychologist, to determine her fitness for duty. Cadarette met the real Dr. Ron Frey in 2021 and the Ottawa Police Service will launch a criminal investigation, however, staff working with the OPS wellness program had known about the possible fraud for eight months, but there was no apparent move toward an investigation until CBC made inquiries. When reached for comment, in White said he remembers Cadarette's name but does not recall meeting her in person. White said it's unlikely he would have asked two civilian employees to tell an officer their sidearm was being removed, saying that's the responsibility of senior officers. He also said it's the force's doctor that recommends mental health assessments, not the chief. The allegations of Dr. Frey were investigated by the York Police Service and he was subsequently charged with public mischief. Dr. Frey later admitted that he had in fact provided services to Cst. Caderette and that he was mistaken and the charges were withdrawn in court.

On September 29, 2022, White announced he would be resigning from the Senate and moving to Finland, where his family has a home. The resignation took effect on October 2.
