= Tyler Watt =

Canadian politician (born 1990)

Tyler Watt MPP

Member of the Ontario Provincial Parliament for Nepean
- Incumbent
- Assumed office February 27, 2025
- Preceded by: Lisa MacLeod

Personal details
- Born: September 21, 1990 (age 36)
- Party: Ontario Liberal
- Education: Trent University; Laurentian University
- Profession: Politician; nurse
- Website: www.tylerwatt.ca

Tyler Watt MPP (born September 21, 1990) is a Canadian politician who was elected as a member of Provincial Parliament (MPP) in the 2025 Ontario general election. He represents the electoral district of Nepean as a member of the Ontario Liberal Party.

== Early life and education ==
Tyler grew up in Barrhaven, Nepean where he attended John McCrae Secondary School. He earned a Bachelor of Science in Biology at Trent University in 2012. He later earned a Bachelor of Science in Nursing at St. Lawrence College in Kingston.

== Political career ==
Watt ran to become a member of Provincial Parliament (MPP) for the electoral district of Nepean in the 2022 Ontario general election, losing narrowly to Lisa MacLeod, before winning the seat in 2025 after MacLeod retired from the legislature.

== Personal life ==
Watt, a registered nurse, is openly gay.

== Electoral record ==
Watt is the current Liberal Party critic for Training, Colleges & University, Long Term Care.

2025 Ontario general election
Party	Candidate	Votes	%	±%	Expenditures
Liberal	Tyler Watt	22,683	48.5	+14.0	
Progressive Conservative	Alex Lewis	17,962	38.4	–0.9	
New Democratic	Max Blair	4,116	8.8	–10.5	
Green	Sheilagh McLean	887	1.9	–2.0	
New Blue	John Kovach	485	1.0	–1.2	
Ontario Party	Carmen Charbonneau	385	0.8	–0.1	
Independent	Peter Westaway	223	0.5	N/A	
Total valid votes/expense limit					
Total rejected, unmarked, and declined ballots					
Turnout			45.5	–0.4	
Eligible voters		102,744			

2022 Ontario general election: Nepean
Party	Candidate	Votes	%	±%	Expenditures
Progressive Conservative	Lisa MacLeod	17,123	39.26	–5.87	$56,906
Liberal	Tyler Watt	15,029	34.46	+14.85	$68,470
New Democratic	Brian Double	8,435	19.34	–9.19	$5,327
Green	Kaitlyn Tremblay	1,696	3.89	–1.28	$381
New Blue	Kathleen Corriveau	964	2.21	–	$4,503
Ontario Party	Bryan Emmerson	370	0.85	–	$0
Total valid votes/expense limit		43,617	99.43	–	$134,511
Total rejected, unmarked and declined ballots		249	0.57	–0.33	
Turnout		43,866	45.89	–12.85	
Eligible voters		95,599			
Progressive Conservative hold		Swing		–10.36	
Source: Elections Ontario
