= Lisa MacLeod =

Canadian politician (born 1974)

The Honourable Lisa MacLeod ECO

Minister of Heritage, Sport, Tourism and Culture Industries
- In office June 20, 2019 – June 24, 2022
- Premier: Doug Ford
- Preceded by: Michael Tibollo
- Succeeded by: Neil Lumsden

Minister of Children, Community and Social Services
- In office June 29, 2018 – June 20, 2019
- Premier: Doug Ford
- Preceded by: Michael Coteau (Note: Michael Coteau (Minister of Children and Youth Services and Minister of Community and Social Services))
- Succeeded by: Todd Smith

Minister Responsible for Women's Issues
- In office June 29, 2018 – June 20, 2019
- Premier: Doug Ford
- Preceded by: Harinder Malhi (Note: Harinder Malhi was Minister of the Status of Women.)
- Succeeded by: Jill Dunlop (Note: Jill Dunlop as Associate Minister of Children and Women's Issues.)

Member of the Ontario Provincial Parliament for Nepean—Carleton
- In office March 30, 2006 – May 9, 2018
- Preceded by: John Baird
- Succeeded by: Riding dissolved

Member of the Ontario Provincial Parliament for Nepean
- In office June 7, 2018 – January 28, 2025
- Preceded by: Riding established
- Succeeded by: Tyler Watt

Personal details
- Born: Lisa Anne MacLeod; October 29, 1974 (age 52) New Glasgow, Nova Scotia, Canada
- Party: Progressive Conservative
- Spouse: Joseph Varner (m. c. 2002)
- Education: St. Francis Xavier University
- Occupation: Political aide
- Website: lisamacleod.com

Lisa Anne MacLeod ECO (born 1974) is a Canadian politician who represented Nepean in the Legislative Assembly of Ontario. Elected in 2006, MacLeod is a member of the Progressive Conservative (PC) Party. She previously served as the Ontario minister of children, community and social services from 2018 to 2019 and Ontario minister of heritage, sport, tourism and culture industries from 2019 to 2022.

On September 13, 2024, it was announced that MacLeod would not be seeking re-election in the 2025 election.

== Background ==
MacLeod was born on October 29, 1974, in New Glasgow, Nova Scotia. She went to St. Francis Xavier University, where she obtained a degree in political science. In 1998, she moved to Ottawa with a goal of becoming involved in politics. She worked as an assistant to Ottawa City Councillor Jan Harder and as a riding assistant to federal Member of Parliament (MP) Pierre Poilievre.

She is married to Joseph Varner and they have one daughter, Victoria. Varner was a candidate in the 2003 provincial election but lost to Richard Patten.

In 2022, MacLeod revealed that she had been dealing with depression since 2014, and had also been diagnosed with bipolar disorder and a metabolic condition, which requires her to take life long medications. She described it as a "mental health crisis".

== Political career ==
=== Opposition MPP ===
MacLeod was elected to the Ontario legislature in a by-election that was held to replace John Baird who resigned to run for the federal House of Commons. She won the election on March 30, 2006, beating her Liberal opponent Brian Ford in the Ottawa-area riding of Nepean—Carleton by a margin of 6,000 votes. She was re-elected in 2007, 2011, and 2014.

In 2007 MacLeod was satirized by Liberal strategist Warren Kinsella when she was mockingly portrayed in a spoofed picture suggesting she would rather be at home baking cookies than attending a political event with then PC Leader John Tory. Kinsella later removed the posting and apologized to MacLeod. Following the incident MacLeod wrote a cookbook called I'd Rather Be Baking Cookies: A Collection of Recipes from Lisa MacLeod and Friends. MacLeod said, "Why not play off that experience, make a cookbook and poke fun at the absurdity of it?" The money raised from the sale of the cookbooks went to her election campaign. In 2019, Kinsella told Globe and Mail described her as the sister he never had.

In 2012, she criticized Dalton McGuinty's Bill 13 legislation as being "unfair" to Catholic separate school boards because it forced them to allow gay–straight alliances. She labelled the Liberals as "bullies".

In April 2014, Premier Kathleen Wynne launched a libel lawsuit against MacLeod and PC Party Leader Tim Hudak after they said that she "oversaw and possibly ordered the criminal destruction of [gas plant] documents." In July 2015, Wynne, MacLeod, and Hudak reached an agreement whereby the lawsuit was dropped. They said in a joint statement,

Politics is not for the thin-skinned. However, our system also requires that politicians act honestly and based on fact, while respecting the views of others. ... In the lead-up to the last election the debate went beyond differences over our approach and at times became personal. The lawsuit between us, and the comments that led to it, did not reflect our view that the other is in fact a great mother/father, an honourable person and a dedicated public servant.

The statement avoided any apology or placement of blame.

MacLeod announced her candidacy for the leadership of the Ontario Progressive Conservative party on October 6, 2014, but withdrew on February 6, 2015, following federal cabinet minister John Baird's announcement that he was resigning from cabinet and would not be running for re-election to the House of Commons of Canada. MacLeod told reporters that she has been "under enormous pressure from my constituents to seek the federal nomination to replace John Baird", in the new riding of Nepean. MacLeod decided not to seek Baird's seat in the House of Commons and remained at Queen's Park.

In July 2014, MacLeod became the party's critic for Treasury Board issues, and in October of that year, she became the Vice-Chair for the Standing Committee on Public Accounts. She was Critic for Digital Government from June 2016 until February 2017, when she became the party' critic for Ottawa issues and the Anti-Racism Secretariat. In January 2018, after party leader Patrick Brown stepped down and Vic Fedeli became leader, MacLeod was chosen to replace Fedeli as the party's finance critic.

=== In government ===
MacLeod was voted in the 2018 provincial election. On June 29, 2018, it was announced she would be the minister responsible for children, community, and social services, and Minister Responsible for woman's issues. In total she had five portfolios including immigration and anti-racism.

As Social Services Minister, MacLeod admitted to breaking a Progressive Conservative election promise by cutting the Ontario Basic Income Pilot Project on July 31, 2018.

On February 13, 2019, the National Post reported that Ontario Association for Behaviour Analysts (ONTABA) had received a threatening message from MacLeod's office. In the email, ONTABA was directed to make a public statement in support of the changes to the Ontario Autism Program or face "four long years". MacLeod further threatened that if the message of support was not forthcoming, her office would release a press statement labeling ONTABA as "self-interested". Immediate calls from parents of children with autism for MacLeod's resignation were rebuffed by the minister. On October 31, 2019, Warren Kinsella told The Globe and Mail that his firm provided strategic advice and media training for the government to MacLeod and her political staff in 2018 when dealing with the cuts.

MacLeod was shuffled from Minister of Children, Community and Social Services to Minister of Tourism, Culture and Sport in 2019. The ministry was later renamed the Ministry of Heritage, Sport, Tourism and Cultural Industries to reflect the significant economic impact the cultural industries such as film, television and the arts have on the province.

An internal review of the overhauled autism program by fellow Progressive Conservative MPP Roman Baber called for an immediate reset to MacLeod's program, as it would leave families "destitute".

In June 2019, at a Rolling Stones concert, MacLeod allegedly publicly said to Eugene Melnyk: "I am your minister and you’re a fucking piece of shit and you're a fucking loser." After a personal complaint by Melnyk to Ontario Premier Doug Ford, she apologized for her "blunt" language but the apology was not accepted. There were calls for her resignation from Ontario Liberals.

During the 2022 Ontario election, the NDP revealed that the Conservative riding association of Vanier had paid her $44,000 directly as a housing subsidy. Such payments are highly unusual as MPPs receive $26,000 in a housing allowance above and beyond their salary.

Following her re-election during the 2022 Ontario general election, MacLeod announced that she would be taking some time off to “address and improve” her health.

In November 2024, Lisa MacLeod condemned a high school teacher for playing "a song in Arabic" during the Remembrance Day ceremony, saying it required "disciplinary measures". The song itself was called "This is Peace" and contains no political content. The National Council of Canadian Muslims criticized MacLeod for criticizing a song simply because it is in Arabic. MacLeod's comments were also cited as an example of anti-Arab racism.

In January 2025, Husein Abu-Rayash, a PC nomination candidate for her riding of Nepean, accused Lisa MacLeod of making "defamatory, hateful, and Islamophobic" comments against him. MacLeod's comments were also condemned by Ottawa city Councillor David Hill and the National Council of Canadian Muslims. MacLeod apologized for her comments.

== Cabinet positions ==
Ford ministry, Province of Ontario (2018–present)
Cabinet posts (3)
Predecessor	Office	Successor
Michael Tibollo	Minister of Tourism, Culture, and Sport; June 20, 2019-June 24, 2022	Neil Lumsden
Harinder Malhi (Note: as Minister of the Status of Women)	Minister Responsible for Women's Issues; June 29, 2018-June 20, 2019	Jill Dunlop (Note: as Associate Minister of Children and Women's Issues)
Michael Coteau (Note: as Minister of Community and Social Services and Minister of Children and Youth Services)	Minister of Children, Community and Social Services; June 29, 2018–June 20, 2019	Todd Smith

== Electoral record ==
2022 Ontario general election: Nepean
Party	Candidate	Votes	%	±%	Expenditures
Progressive Conservative	Lisa MacLeod	17,123	39.26	–5.87	$56,906
Liberal	Tyler Watt	15,029	34.46	+14.85	$68,470
New Democratic	Brian Double	8,435	19.34	–9.19	$5,327
Green	Kaitlyn Tremblay	1,696	3.89	–1.28	$381
New Blue	Kathleen Corriveau	964	2.21	–	$4,503
Ontario Party	Bryan Emmerson	370	0.85	–	$0
Total valid votes/expense limit		43,617	99.43	–	$134,511
Total rejected, unmarked and declined ballots		249	0.57	–0.33	
Turnout		43,866	45.89	–12.85	
Eligible voters		95,599			
Progressive Conservative hold		Swing		–10.36	
Source: Elections Ontario

2018 Ontario general election: Nepean
Party	Candidate	Votes	%	±%
Progressive Conservative	Lisa MacLeod	23,899	45.13	+2.61
New Democratic	Zaff Ansari	15,110	28.53	+15.49
Liberal	Lovina Srivastava	10,383	19.61	–16.38
Green	James O'Grady	2,739	5.17	–0.26
Libertarian	Mark A. Snow	415	0.78	–
None of the Above	Raphael Louis	351	0.66	–
Objective Truth	Derrick Lionel Matthews	60	0.11	–
Total valid votes		52,957	99.10	
Total rejected, unmarked and declined ballots		481	0.90	
Turnout		53,438	58.73	
Eligible voters		90,987		
Progressive Conservative notional hold		Swing		–6.44
Source: Elections Ontario

2014 Ontario general election: Nepean—Carleton
Party	Candidate	Votes	%	±%
Progressive Conservative	Lisa MacLeod	30,901	46.77	–7.71
Liberal	Jack Uppal	21,974	33.26	+6.29
New Democratic	Ric Dagenais	8,628	13.06	–1.71
Green	Gordon Kubanek	3,630	5.49	+2.51
Libertarian	Coreen Corcoran	940	1.42	+1.02
Total valid votes		66,073	98.85	
Total rejected, unmarked and declined ballots		766	1.15	+0.80
Turnout		66,839	55.39	+5.48
Eligible voters		120,669		
Progressive Conservative hold		Swing		–7.00
Source: Elections Ontario

2011 Ontario general election: Nepean—Carleton
Party	Candidate	Votes	%	±%	Expenditures
Progressive Conservative	Lisa MacLeod	29,985	54.48	+4.20	$61,855.47
Liberal	Don Dransfield	14,844	26.97	–5.97	$20,300.63
New Democratic	Ric Dagenais	8,127	14.77	+7.34	$18,039.80
Green	Gordon Kubanek	1,641	2.98	–5.38	$2,855.87
Libertarian	Roger Toutant	223	0.41	–	$0
Freedom	Marco Rossi	217	0.39	–	$0
Total valid votes/expense limit		55,037	99.65	–	$131,703.25
Total rejected, unmarked and declined ballots		193	0.35	–0.16	
Turnout		55,230	49.91	–4.71	
Eligible voters		110,662			
Progressive Conservative hold		Swing		+5.08	
Source: Elections Ontario

2007 Ontario general election: Nepean—Carleton
Party	Candidate	Votes	%	±%	Expenditures
Progressive Conservative	Lisa MacLeod	27,070	50.28	–7.28	$58,239.69
Liberal	Jai Aggarwal	17,731	32.94	+1.50	$35,359.08
Green	Gordon Kubanek	4,500	8.36	+6.25	$3,130.46
New Democratic	Tristan Maack	4,000	7.43	–0.84	$11,543.93
Family Coalition	Suzanne Fortin	533	0.99	–	$0
Total valid votes		53,834	99.49	–	$107,004.24
Total rejected, unmarked and declined ballots		277	0.51	+0.07	
Turnout		54,111	54.61	+26.06	
Eligible voters		99,078			
Progressive Conservative hold		Swing		–4.39	
Source: Elections Ontario

Ontario provincial by-election, March 30, 2006: Nepean—Carleton Resignation of John Baird to run federally
Party	Candidate	Votes	%	±%	Expenditures
Progressive Conservative	Lisa MacLeod	17,312	57.57	+3.51	$89,547.03
Liberal	Brian Ford	9,455	31.44	–4.21	$58,560.17
New Democratic	Laurel Gibbons	2,487	8.27	+1.73	$32,687.68
Green	Peter V. Tretter	634	2.11	–1.65	$852.94
Independent	John Turmel	112	0.37	–	$0
Freedom	Jurgen Vollrath	73	0.24	–	$0
Total valid votes/expense limit		30,073	99.55	–	$114,226.16
Total rejected, unmarked and declined ballots		135	0.45	–0.00	
Turnout		30,208	28.55	–33.67	
Eligible voters		105,802			
Progressive Conservative hold		Swing		+3.86	
Source: Elections Ontario
