= Hans Daigeler =

Canadian politician

Member of the Ontario Provincial Parliament for Nepean
- In office September 10, 1987 – April 28, 1995
- Preceded by: First member
- Succeeded by: John Baird

Personal details
- Born: February 21, 1945 Bad Toelz, West Germany
- Died: November 9, 1995 (aged 50) Ottawa, Ontario, Canada
- Party: Liberal
- Education: Carleton University; University of Fribourg; University of Würzburg
- Occupation: Researcher, School Trustee, Politician

Hans Wolfgang Daigeler (February 21, 1945 – November 9, 1995) was a politician in Ontario, Canada. He served as a Liberal member of the Legislative Assembly of Ontario from 1987 to 1995

== Background ==
Daigeler was educated at the University of Würzburg in West Germany, the University of Fribourg in Switzerland and Carleton University in Ottawa, Ontario, Canada. He received a Doctorate in Theology, and worked as a research and planning officer. Daigeler was a Roman Catholic, and a member of the Knights of Columbus.

== Politics ==
He was elected to the Carleton Separate School Board in 1982 and 1985. As a trustee, he took a particular interest in providing services for children with developmental disabilities. He was very active in the planning of the first Canadian Christian Festival, held in 1982 in Ottawa.

He ran for the Ontario legislature in the 1981 provincial election, and finished second against Progressive Conservative Bob Mitchell in the riding of Carleton (future New Democratic Party MP Judy Wasylycia-Leis finished third). He ran again in the 1985 provincial election, and finished a much closer second against Mitchell.

Daigeler challenged Mitchell a third time in the 1987 provincial election, and defeated him by 3,636 votes in the redistributed riding of Nepean. His victory occurred amid a landslide majority win for the Liberal Party under David Peterson. Daigeler served as a parliamentary assistant from 1989 to 1990, and was known for being on the right wing of the Liberal Party.

The Liberals were defeated by the Ontario New Democratic Party in the 1990 provincial election, although Daigeler was personally re-elected with an increased majority. In opposition, he served as his party's critic for Training, Colleges and Universities and Transportation.

The Progressive Conservatives won a majority government in the 1995 provincial election on June 8, 1995, and Daigeler lost to PC candidate John Baird by just under 4,000 votes.

== After politics ==
Daigeler died by suicide on November 9, 1995, barely five months after his electoral defeat. The Ontario legislature formally paid tribute to Daigeler on November 14 of the same year.

== Electoral record ==
1995 Ontario general election: Nepean
Party	Candidate	Votes	%	±%	Expenditures
Progressive Conservative	John Baird	17,510	49.66	+19.13	$40,800.37
Liberal	Hans Daigeler	13,575	38.50	–3.95	$45,021.83
New Democratic	John Sullivan	3,274	9.29	–13.77	$15,380.57
Green	Frank de Jong	390	1.11	–1.78	$0
Natural Law	Brian Ernest Jackson	259	0.73	–	$0
Freedom	Cathy Frampton	252	0.71	–	$2,307.70
Total valid votes		35,260	98.98		
Total rejected, unmarked and declined ballots		363	1.02	+0.04	
Turnout		35,623	64.97	+2.05	
Eligible voters		54,832			
Progressive Conservative gain from Liberal		Swing		+11.54	
Source: Elections Ontario

1990 Ontario general election: Nepean
Party	Candidate	Votes	%	±%
Liberal	Hans Daigeler	13,723	42.45	–6.01
Progressive Conservative	Doug Collins	9,870	30.53	–5.30
New Democratic	John D. Raudoy	7,453	23.05	+7.33
Green	Dan Roy	933	2.89	–
Libertarian	Dan Weiler	349	1.08	–
Total valid votes		32,328	99.02	
Total rejected, unmarked and declined ballots		321	0.98	+0.83
Turnout		32,649	62.91	+0.51
Eligible voters		51,895		
Liberal hold		Swing		–0.36
Source: Elections Ontario

1987 Ontario general election: Nepean
Party	Candidate	Votes	%
Liberal	Hans Daigeler	13,951	48.45
Progressive Conservative	Robert C. Mitchell	10,315	35.83
New Democratic	Larry Jones	4,526	15.72
Total valid votes		28,792	99.85
Total rejected ballots		44	0.15
Turnout		28,836	62.40
Eligible voters		46,210	
Liberal pickup new district.			
Source: Elections Ontario

1985 Ontario general election: Carleton
Party	Candidate	Votes	%	±%
Progressive Conservative	Bob Mitchell	17,732	44.34	-10.92
Liberal	Hans Daigeler	15,093	37.74	+11.05
New Democratic	Bea Murray	7,165	17.91	+1.05
Total valid votes		39,990		
Progressive Conservative hold		Swing		–

1981 Ontario general election: Carleton
Party	Candidate	Votes	%
Progressive Conservative	Bob Mitchell	17,846	55.26
Liberal	Hans Daigeler	8,621	26.69
New Democratic	Judy Wasylycia-Leis	5,446	16.86
Social Credit	Andrew Dana Dynowski	383	1.19
Total valid votes		32,296	
