= John Baird (Canadian politician) =

Canadian politician (born 1969)

The Honourable John Baird PC ECO
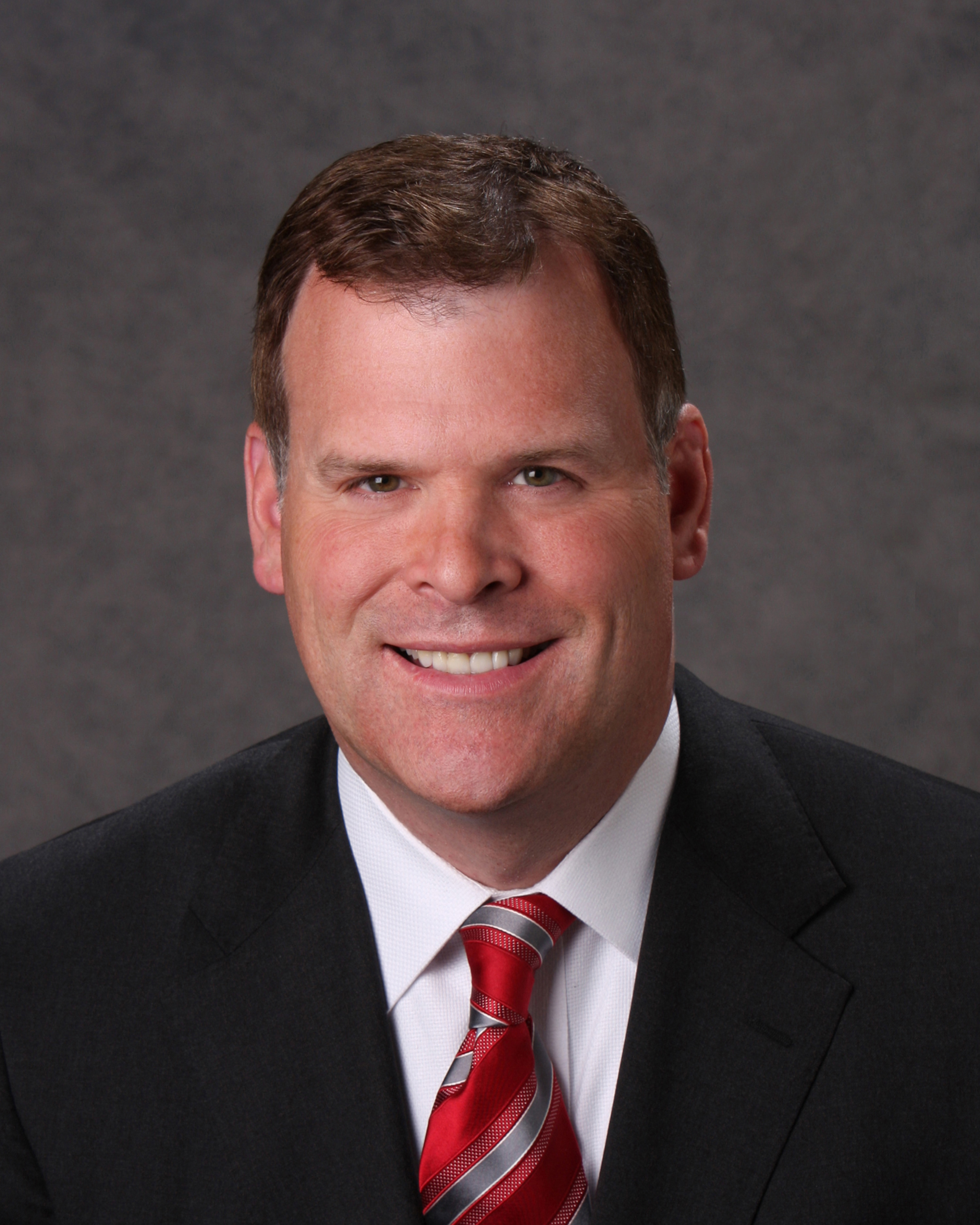
- Baird in 2011

Minister of Foreign Affairs
- In office May 18, 2011 – February 3, 2015
- Prime Minister: Stephen Harper
- Preceded by: Lawrence Cannon
- Succeeded by: Rob Nicholson

Leader of the Government in the House of Commons
- In office August 6, 2010 – May 18, 2011
- Prime Minister: Stephen Harper
- Preceded by: Jay Hill
- Succeeded by: Peter Van Loan

Minister of the Environment
- In office November 7, 2010 – January 4, 2011
- Prime Minister: Stephen Harper
- Preceded by: Jim Prentice
- Succeeded by: Peter Kent
- In office January 4, 2007 – October 30, 2008
- Prime Minister: Stephen Harper
- Preceded by: Rona Ambrose
- Succeeded by: Jim Prentice

Minister of Transport, Infrastructure and Communities
- In office October 30, 2008 – August 6, 2010
- Prime Minister: Stephen Harper
- Preceded by: Lawrence Cannon
- Succeeded by: Chuck Strahl

President of the Treasury Board
- In office February 6, 2006 – January 4, 2007
- Prime Minister: Stephen Harper
- Preceded by: Reg Alcock
- Succeeded by: Vic Toews

Member of Parliament for Ottawa West—Nepean
- In office January 23, 2006 – March 16, 2015
- Preceded by: Marlene Catterall
- Succeeded by: Anita Vandenbeld

Member of the Ontario Provincial Parliament for Nepean—Carleton Nepean (1995–1999)
- In office June 8, 1995 – November 30, 2005
- Preceded by: Constituency established
- Succeeded by: Lisa MacLeod

Personal details
- Born: John Russell Baird; May 26, 1969 (age 57) Nepean, Ontario, Canada
- Party: Conservative (2003–present)
- Other political affiliations: Progressive Conservative (federal, 1995–2003); Progressive Conservative (provincial)
- Education: Queen's University (BA)
- Awards: 40 under 40, Ottawa Business Journal (2008)

John Russell Baird PC (born May 26, 1969) is a retired Canadian politician. He served as Minister of Foreign Affairs from 2011 to 2015 in the cabinet of Prime Minister Stephen Harper. He had been a member of the federal cabinet, in various positions, since 2006. Previously he was a provincial cabinet minister in Ontario during the governments of Premiers Mike Harris and Ernie Eves. Baird resigned from Harper's cabinet on February 3, 2015, and as a Member of Parliament on March 16, 2015.

A long-time resident of the former city of Nepean, where he attended Bell High School, and a graduate of Kingston's Queen's University, he was the member of the House of Commons of Canada for the riding of Ottawa West—Nepean until 2015. Baird was elected there as a candidate for the Conservative Party of Canada in the 2006 federal election, when his party defeated Paul Martin's Liberal Party and established a minority government. Baird was sworn in as Leader of the Government in the House of Commons, replacing Jay Hill, on August 6, 2010. Prior to this, Baird served as Transport Minister starting October 30, 2008, Environment Minister starting January 2007, and President of the Treasury Board during the Conservatives' first year in power.

Baird served in the Legislative Assembly of Ontario from 1995 to 2005 for the riding of Nepean—Carleton (part of Nepean until 1999), and was a cabinet minister in the Progressive Conservative governments of Mike Harris and Ernie Eves. He served as the Minister for Children, Community and Social Services, Energy and Francophone Affairs in addition to being the Government's Chief Whip. After the Conservatives' defeat by Dalton McGuinty's Ontario Liberal Party, he was the party's critic for key portfolios including finance, culture and health. Baird had been a member of the Conservatives since 1985, when he was the youngest delegate at that time and was also a political aide for the federal Progressive Conservative Party of Canada in the late 1980s.

During his tenure in the Harris Cabinet he supported an attempt to sell Hydro One, the publicly owned utility firm. As the federal President of the Treasury Board in the Harper Cabinet, he moved the Federal Accountability Act, which was put in place after the Gomery Commission which investigated the federal sponsorship scandal in the late 1990s and early 2000s. As Minister of the Environment, Baird signalled the Canadian government's opposition to the Kyoto Protocol. He also served as Minister of Foreign Affairs, Minister of Transport, Infrastructure and Communities, and President of the Treasury Board.

== Early life and career ==
Baird was born in Nepean, Ontario, the son of Marianne (née Collins) and Gerald Baird. He became involved in politics when he backed a candidate for the local federal PC nomination in 1984. The next year, aged sixteen, Baird was the youngest delegate to attend the party's January 1985 provincial leadership convention, as a supporter of Ontario Attorney-General Roy McMurtry.

He was later president of the youth wing of the Progressive Conservative Party of Ontario, and aligned himself with Dennis Timbrell during the latter's abortive campaign for the PC leadership in 1989 and 1990. He backed Mike Harris when Timbrell withdrew from the contest. Baird was charged with trespassing during the 1988 federal election, after he tried to question Ontario Premier David Peterson about free trade with the United States during a Liberal Party campaign stop in a Kingston shopping mall. He received a Bachelor of Arts degree in Political Studies from Queen's University in 1992.

Baird worked on the political staff of Perrin Beatty when Beatty was federal Minister of National Defence in the early 1990s, and followed Beatty through the subsequent cabinet shifts that culminated in his becoming Secretary of State for External Affairs in the short-lived 1993 government of Kim Campbell. After the defeat of the Progressive Conservatives in the 1993 federal election, Baird worked as a lobbyist in Ottawa.

Baird says he has been a vegetarian since 1997. However, he admits to eating fish, and he reportedly ate seal meat on a trip to the Arctic in 2009.

In June 2008, he was selected by the Ottawa Business Journal as a recipient of the "Forty Under 40" award.

== Provincial politics ==
=== Government backbencher ===
While Baird had been associated with Red Tories such as McMurtry, Timbrell and Beatty, he became associated with the conservative ideology of the Mike Harris-led Ontario PC party upon entering provincial politics. He was first elected to the Ontario legislature in 1995, defeating Liberal incumbent Hans Daigeler in the Ottawa-area riding of Nepean. The youngest member of the legislature, Baird was appointed parliamentary assistant to the Minister of Labour on July 13, 1995.

He became parliamentary assistant to the Chair of the Management Board of Cabinet in April 1997, and was promoted to parliamentary assistant to the Minister of Finance in November of the same year. As a backbencher, Baird proposed a bill naming Highway 416 as the "Veterans' Memorial Highway" and successfully steered its passage through the legislature. He was easily re-elected in 1999, defeating longtime Ottawa councillor Gord Hunter by a margin of almost 15,000 votes.

=== Community and Social Services minister ===
Baird joined Premier Harris's cabinet on June 17, 1999, as Minister of Community and Social Services, where he became responsible for implementing and expanding Ontario's workfare program. As one of Harris's few bilingual ministers, he was also named as Minister responsible for Francophone Affairs.

==== 1999 ====
Baird's first press conference as a cabinet minister was held in July 1999, and was intended to highlight the Harris government's record in reducing the provincial welfare rolls. He told reporters that 15,000 people had left the system since the introduction of workfare, and used this figure to argue that the government's policy was a success. At the time, he lacked information on the number of workfare recipients who actually found jobs, and he also did not account for 40% of the welfare recipients who had been cut from the list. A number of media reports subsequently criticized both the principle and the implementation of workfare in Ontario.

A September 1999 report from Baird's ministry showed that 10,600 workfare placements had been created in the first six months of 1999, a figure which the Toronto Star observed was significantly lower than that which had been predicted by the government. Baird indicated that he would continue with the workfare program, and that the proportion of welfare recipients on workfare would be increased from 15% to 30%.

Baird sparked criticism in late 1999 for refusing to cancel a five-year contract that had been signed between his department and the Bermuda-based private firm Andersen Consulting (later Accenture), worth up to $180 million. The contract, signed when Janet Ecker was Community and Social Services minister, entrusted Andersen with providing technological upgrades to the province's welfare management system. The arrangement was criticized by Auditor General Erik Peters, who observed that there was nothing in the contract to prevent Andersen from increasing its hourly rates. A published report in early 2000 indicated that Andersen was charging an average of $257 per hour for work that had previously been done by ministry staff at $51 per hour. Another report indicated that the firm had charged a total of $55 million to find roughly $66 million worth of savings. In response to opposition questions, Baird said that he would not terminate the contract but would endeavour to negotiate a lower rate. Baird opposed the Harris government's plan to amalgamate the city of Ottawa with neighboring municipalities, which was approved by the legislature in 1999.

==== 2000 ====
In January 2000, Baird unveiled a series of initiatives designed to reduce fraud and misuse in the welfare system. This was highlighted by the establishment of a welfare fraud hotline and a complementary conditionality three months later, in which anyone convicted of welfare fraud would run the risk of being given a lifetime ban from the program. The investigations Baird initiated during the fiscal year of 2000 uncovered $58.2 million in social assistance that people were not entitled to receive, and $16.6 million in avoided future costs, but critics of this approach, including opposition members, poverty advocates, and scholars, suggested that the Harris government was overstating the extent of fraud in order to undermine public confidence in welfare programs. In mid-year, Baird announced that workfare placements had reached departmental quotas for most of the province.

Baird revealed a $50 million program in May 2000 to help people with developmental disabilities become integrated into their communities. He later affirmed that the province was considering closing its remaining three institutions for the mentally handicapped as part of a larger strategy focusing on home care. Baird expressed concern about the physical condition of these institutions, saying that their residents "deserve better". Later that same year, he stated that his department would spend $26 million on shelters and other funding for the homeless.

Baird supported mandatory drug-testing for welfare recipients and argued that those who refused such tests should be at risk of having their assistance cut off. He introduced a policy initiative to this effect at a press conference in late 2000, in which he dramatically cast a box of syringes onto the floor and said that his department planned to "stop people from shooting their welfare cheque up their arm, and to help them shoot up the ladder of success". Baird acknowledged that his department did not have reliable figures on the number of welfare recipients abusing drugs, although he cited estimates of between 4% and 10%. The proposal was criticized by several people, including Ontario Human Rights Commissioner Keith Norton, a former Progressive Conservative cabinet minister, who expressed concern that it could violate Ontario's human rights code, but officials including Baird justified the measures as, "necessary in order to push people still receiving assistance toward independence."

Shortly after Baird's announcement, a government website operated by the Ministry of Community and Social Services launched an attack against Liberal Party leader Dalton McGuinty for opposing the drug testing plan. The site claimed that McGuinty was "opposed to helping welfare recipients who are addicted to drugs". Baird denied that the message was partisan and initially refused to apologize. The Speaker of the Legislative Assembly of Ontario subsequently ruled that the site content was inappropriate and it was removed by the government, with an apology.

==== 2001–2002 ====
In early 2001, Baird announced that his government's proposed drug-testing plan would be extended to identify welfare recipients addicted to prescription drugs and alcohol. He later announced that provincial welfare applicants would be required to pass a literacy test. The Harris government's welfare policies were put under scrutiny in August 2001 after a pregnant woman in Sudbury, Kimberly Rogers, died while serving a house arrest for welfare fraud. The woman had been confined to her apartment for three months and reports indicated that her pregnancy was "exacerbated by sweltering conditions in her apartment". Responding to criticism, Baird said that he could not comment on the specifics of the case until a coroner's inquest was completed. He defended his government's general policy on welfare issues. A subsequent inquest did not assign blame to the government for the woman's death, but recommended that lifetime bans for fraud be eliminated, and that adequate food, housing and medication be provided to anyone under house arrest.

Baird was given additional responsibilities as Minister responsible for Children on February 8, 2001. His department increased funding for child services early in the year, amid a significant increase in provincial demand. In November 2001, the provincial media obtained a confidential government report recommending 40–45% cuts in provincial child-care programs. Baird initially declined to comment on the document's contents, but rejected its proposals in early 2002.

Baird was the first cabinet minister to support Jim Flaherty's campaign to succeed Mike Harris as Progressive Conservative leader in the party's 2002 leadership election. The election was won by Flaherty's rival Ernie Eves, and early media reports suggested that Baird might be dropped from the new premier's cabinet in April 2002. He was not, but was demoted to the position of Chief Government Whip while remaining associate minister for Francophone Affairs. His replacement in Social Services was Brenda Elliott, who was from the more centrist wing of the Progressive Conservative Party.

=== Energy Minister and Government House Leader ===
Baird was returned to a more prominent cabinet position in August 2002 after Eves separated the ministries of Environment and Energy and appointed Baird to head the latter department. Baird was given additional responsibilities as Government House Leader in June 2003 after Chris Stockwell was forced to resign following allegations that he had used government funds for a family vacation.

As Energy Minister, Baird was entrusted with implementing the government's plan to sell off part of Ontario's Hydro One. A few months later, he became unexpectedly involved in two major and interrelated policy reversals. The Energy ministry came under intense media scrutiny in late 2002 after hydro rates increased significantly in many parts of the province. Critics argued that the Progressive Conservative government's price deregulation policy (implemented before Baird became Energy Minister) was responsible. Baird suggested that the rate increases resulted from an unusually hot summer. Rates remained high through the autumn, and the Eves government was forced to re-regulate the market in November by introducing a price cap. The government continued to support deregulation in principle, but maintained the cap for the remainder of its term in office. The second and more fundamental reversal occurred in late January 2003, when Premier Eves announced that Hydro One would remain under public control.

Baird was regarded as less combative as Energy Minister than he had been in Community and Social Services. The energy policies of the Eves government were controversial, but opposition criticism was often directed at the premier rather than at Baird. Eves took a prominent interest in the Energy portfolio, and sometimes relegated Baird to a secondary role in policy announcements. In November 2002, however, he was followed around the province by "Hydrozilla", a man in a giant lizard suit sent by the Ontario New Democratic Party as a stunt to show that deregulating electricity rates would create an 'economic monster' for consumers. In early March 2003, Baird announced that the government might be forced to implement rolling blackouts as a response to energy shortages. He encouraged conservation in late summer 2003, following a province-wide blackout caused by a generator failure in the United States.

=== Opposition member ===
The Ontario Liberal Party won a majority government in the 2003 election, although Baird was comfortably re-elected in his own seat. Between 2003 and 2005 he served as Official Opposition critic for Finance, Culture, Francophone Affairs, Intergovernmental Affairs and Health. He opposed the imposition of a health premium by Dalton McGuinty's government in 2004, charging that the Liberals broke an election pledge not the raise taxes. Baird and New Democrat Peter Kormos were vocal critics of Speaker Alvin Curling for allegedly favouring his Liberal colleagues, saying that he sanctioned Conservative and NDP members for behaviour he would allow from Liberals. At one stage, Baird described Curling's job performance as an "absolute disgrace".

Baird co-chaired Jim Flaherty's second campaign to lead the Progressive Conservative party in 2004. Flaherty was again unsuccessful, losing on the second ballot to the more centrist John Tory. Baird and Flaherty left provincial politics in 2005 to campaign for the federal House of Commons. Although Baird was generally on the right wing of the provincial Progressive Conservative Party, he expressed liberal views on some social issues. He supported same-sex marriage during the 2003 provincial election, and in 2005 helped the McGuinty government achieve quick passage of a provincial bill granting legal recognition to same-sex couples.

== Federal politics ==
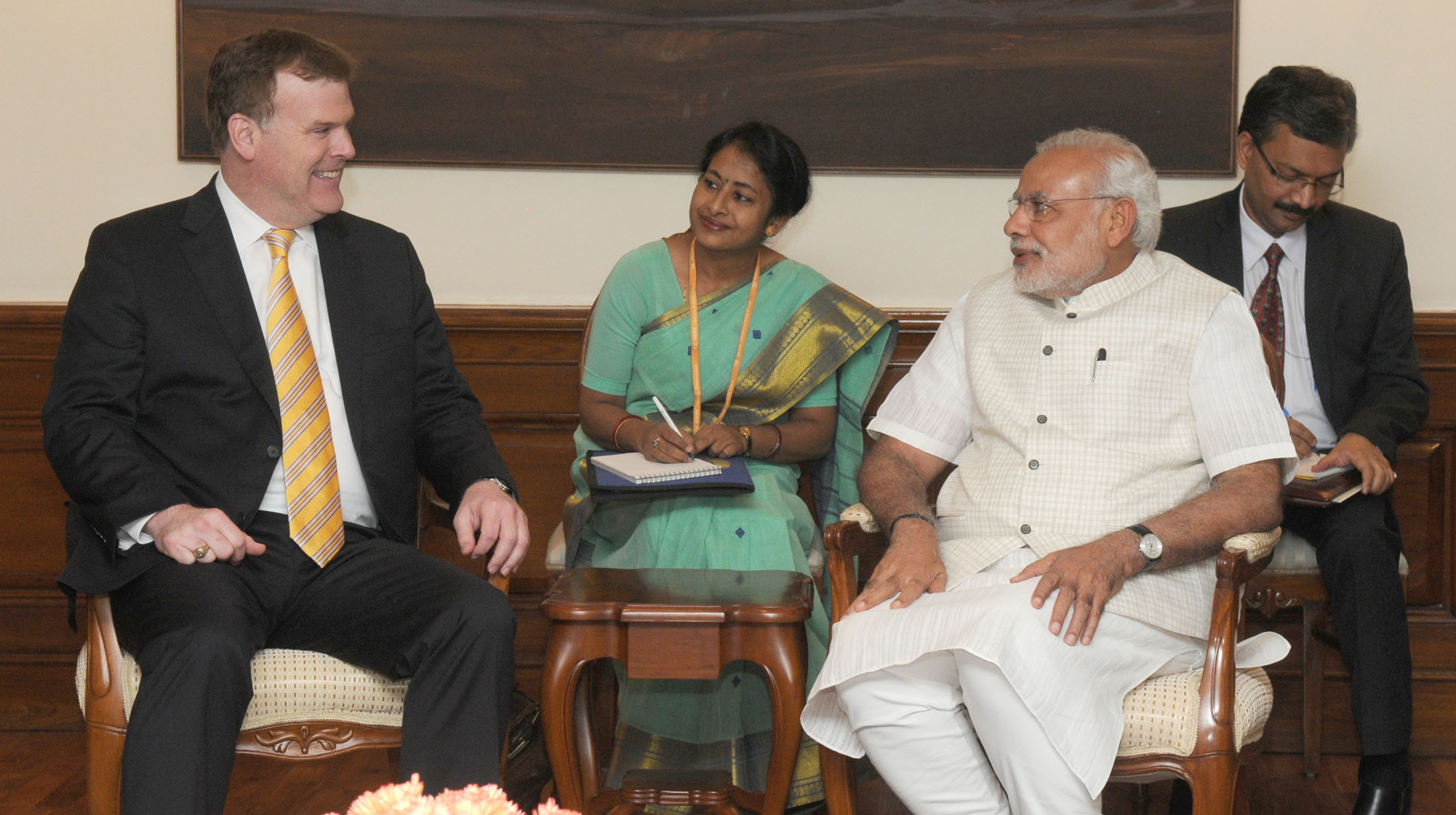
Baird with Narendra Modi in India in 2014

Baird supported a Canadian Alliance candidate in the 2000 federal election, and later endorsed Stephen Harper's bid to lead the newly formed Conservative Party of Canada in its 2004 leadership election. He was appointed as the Conservative Party's Ontario co-chair for the 2004 federal election. There were rumours that Baird would leave provincial politics to contest the 2004 election, but this did not happen. In 2005 he resigned his provincial seat to campaign federally for the Conservative Party.

Baird won a contested nomination battle for Ottawa West—Nepean Conservative nomination on May 5, 2005, defeating challengers Ed Mahfouz, Margret Kopala and Ade Olumide. John Pacheco later campaigned in the election as an "Independent conservative", with the specific intent of being a spoiler against Baird. He argued that if his campaign caused Baird to lose, the Conservatives would "get the message that social conservatives are serious about their politics." Baird chose to ignore Pacheco entirely in at least one all-candidates debate.

Baird was elected, defeating Liberal candidate Lee Farnworth by about 5,000 votes. The Ottawa Citizen endorsed Baird in this campaign, and argued that his political judgment had improved considerably since his tenure as a Harris cabinet minister. In December 2006 Baird was one of thirteen Conservative MPs who voted against reopening the national debate on same-sex marriage.

Baird played an aggressive role in Question Period after his appointment to cabinet, leading MP Garth Turner to describe him as Stephen Harper's "Commons pit bull".

=== President of the Treasury Board ===
Baird was appointed President of the Treasury Board on February 6, 2006. Following his appointment, he said that one of his priorities would be to prevent government jobs from being relocated from Ottawa to other regions for political purposes. Baird also indicated that his government was not planning to introduce job cuts or initiate a radical reduction in the size of government. In June 2006 he announced the creation of a three-member panel to advise the federal government on grant and contribution programs and accountability issues. One of the members was Frances Lankin, a former Ontario New Democratic Party cabinet minister.

==== Accountability Act ====
Baird introduced the Conservative government's first piece of legislation in April 2006. The Accountability Act promised significant reform to the structure of Canadian politics and government. Prime Minister Harper said that it would "put an end to the influence of money" in the Canadian government. The Accountability Act restricted the ability of former politicians and bureaucrats to become lobbyists, provided protection to whistle-blowers in the civil service and gave the Auditor General of Canada new powers of oversight. It limited individual donations to political parties and candidates to $1,100 per year (down from $5,200), created nine new or revised positions to oversee the activities of public officials and placed crown corporations such as the Canadian Broadcasting Corporation under access-to-information legislation.

Opposition MPs complained that several recommendations for access-to-information reform were omitted from the bill, and were instead sent to committee for further review. New Democratic Party MP Pat Martin suggested that this deferral could delay meaningful reform for the foreseeable future. Martin later made a deal with Baird to give the bill an easy passage through committee, in return for the Conservatives accepting some NDP amendments.

Information Commissioner John Reid criticized the new proposed powers for his department under the legislation, arguing that they would create unnecessary bureaucracy. Shortly after the Accountability Act was introduced to parliament, Reid issued an emergency report saying that the legislation would "increase the government's ability to cover up wrongdoing, shield itself from embarrassment and control the flow of information to Canadians". He added that no government had ever put forward "a more retrograde and dangerous" set of proposals for dealing with access to information laws. Baird described Reid's criticisms as "excessive", stating that most of the commissioner's specific concerns were minor in nature. Representatives of Canada's business community also expressed concern about changes to disclosure laws, arguing that their commercial secrets could be exposed to competitors.

The bill passed the House of Commons on division in June 2006. The Senate of Canada approved it in December 2006, with several amendments, and sent it back to the Commons for further consideration. The amended Act was approved by the Commons without debate on December 8, and was signed into law four days later.

Shortly after the bill first passed the Commons, Baird acknowledged that the Conservatives might have unintentionally broken political financing laws by failing to report convention fees collected in 2005. He told a Senate committee that $1.7 million was left unreported and that he did not realize it was an issue at the time. The matter is under review by the Chief Electoral Officer. The Conservatives quietly tabled an amendment to the Accountability Act in November 2006, stipulating that convention fees will not be counted as political contributions.

==== Program cuts ====
In May 2006, Baird was asked to find $1 billion in cuts for 2006 and 2007. On September 25, on the same day that the government announced a $13.2 billion surplus, Baird announced cuts to sixty-six federal programs, including Status of Women, medicinal marijuana research, Canadian museums, adult literacy, youth employment and social development and the British Columbia pine beetle program. One of the most controversial cuts was to the federal Court Challenges Program, which provided funding for Canadians to pursue rights cases in the Canadian court system. Baird argued that government funding would be redirected in a way that "reflects the priorities of working families" and that he "just [didn't] think it made sense for the government to subsidize lawyers to challenge the government's own laws in court." In justifying cuts to adult literacy programs, Baird referenced his government's support for youth literacy and said, "We've got to fix the ground level problem and not be trying to do repair work after the fact."

==== 2006 Ottawa municipal election ====
In early October 2006, Baird's department reviewed a promised $200 million grant to the City of Ottawa's light-rail expansion project for the O-Train. Baird indicated that the government would keep the funding at least until the November election, but added that the Council elected in November would have the final say on the issue. He also leaked details of the city's contact with the German firm Siemens. As a result, the rail program became a focal issue in the 2006 Ottawa mayoral election and Baird's opponents accused him of trying to influence the outcome. Baird and Ottawa Mayor Bob Chiarelli accused one another of lying about details of the project, and Liberal MP Navdeep Bains asked the Federal Ethics Commissioner to investigate Baird's decision to release details of the private contract. Chiarelli was defeated in the election and the light-rail expansion was stopped by the new council.

An Ottawa Citizen report in January 2007 revealed that federal officials had not posed any objections to the light-rail project before Baird's intervention, and suggested that his involvement was political in nature. Green Party leader Elizabeth May speculated that Ottawa may have been deprived of light-rail service because of an apparent "personal vendetta" from Baird against Chiarelli. Baird denied this charge, saying that his intervention was not political.

Opponents of the light-rail project have argued that it was undertaken without sufficient consultation with the public. In February 2008, it was reported that the House of Commons committee on government operations would be looking into his involvement over the case. MP and committee member Mark Holland voiced a concern that Baird leaked information on the contract. Baird replied that he made the right decision and dismissed the investigation saying "there is no evidence of anything". Speaking to reporters he added following the announcement of the investigation: "If you want to avert a billion-dollar boondoggle, you have to make some difficult decisions".

==== Other responsibilities ====
Baird held ministerial responsibilities for the Toronto Harbourfront Centre and the Toronto Waterfront Revitalization Corporation. He developed a working relationship with Toronto Mayor David Miller soon after his appointment, and was present for the announcement of a comprehensive new waterfront strategy in June 2006. Ontario cabinet minister David Caplan described Baird as a champion of waterfront renewal and Miller described him as an ally of the city. Baird spent Christmas 2006 meeting with Canadian soldiers in Afghanistan.

=== Environment Minister 2007–08 ===
On January 4, 2007, Baird was appointed as Environment Minister in a cabinet shuffle, replacing Rona Ambrose. In making the appointment, Prime Minister Stephen Harper acknowledged that his government needed to do more to make the environment a priority. Some commentators remarked favourably on Baird's appointment, describing him as a strong communicator and negotiator. Columnist Andrew Coyne, however, described Baird as "the man sent to kill the issue," suggesting that Baird's appointment was meant to neutralize the environment as an election issue rather than to initiate any meaningful reforms. Baird is a vocal opponent of the Kyoto Protocol, which he argues will bring about an "economic collapse". Later in 2007, he added that any new environmental agreements must include reduction targets for major greenhouse emitters such as China, India and the United States who have not signed the Protocol or does not have any mandatory reductions set by the Protocol. Baird met with renowned Canadian environmentalist David Suzuki following his appointment. At the time Suzuki said he was encouraged by Baird's approach, but remained skeptical of the Harper government's environmental plans. However, when Baird unveiled the Conservative government's plan in April 2007, Suzuki confronted him, calling the plan "a disappointment".

==== Approach to the Kyoto Protocol ====
In February 2007, the Liberal opposition brought forward a non-binding motion for Canada to renew its commitment to the Kyoto Protocol. All Conservative MPs who were present in the House, including Baird, voted against the motion, which passed with the support of the three opposition parties. The following month, opposition members on a special Commons committee used their majority to bring forward sweeping changes to the government's Clean Air Act. Among other things, the revised Act called for participation in international carbon markets and the fulfillment of Kyoto targets.

Baird indicated that the opposition's changes would not be included in federal targets or regulations.

In April 2007, Baird produced a federal study supported by five independent economists to support his approach to the Kyoto Protocol. Among the five economists was Toronto-Dominion Bank chief economist Don Drummond, who also wrote a private letter to Baird arguing that the "economic cost [of implementing Kyoto] would be at least as deep as the recession in the early 1980s." Opposition parliamentarians dismissed the report as a scare tactic, while Liberal Environment critic David McGuinty argued that the study was misleading, saying that it did not properly examine international emission trading and ignored jobs to be created through the "green economy". The report claimed that Canada's ability to invest in developing nations to meet emissions targets through CDM by misquoting the amount of credit to be $85 million instead of the real approximation of $3 billion. Soon afterward, a United Nations report also contradicted the study mentioning that "steep cuts in greenhouse gas emissions can be accomplished at a cost of only 0.12 per cent of the world's annual economic output" but Baird responded that Canada's gas emission levels would peak in 2012, three years before the UN's set target of 2015.

==== Environmental strategy ====
Baird was the Harper government's representative at the release of a major United Nations report on climate change in Paris in February 2007. He described the report as a "turning point in the battle against climate change," while indicating his surprise that human activity was found to be a major cause of the phenomenon.

Baird released his government's targets for greenhouse gas emissions in late April 2007. The plan calls for Canada to begin cutting its existing rate of greenhouse gas emissions by 2010 and for cuts to reach 20% by 2020. Under this plan, Canada will reach its Kyoto targets between 2020 and 2025, taking an additional eight to thirteen years longer than Kyoto. The government plan uses production intensity targets instead of hard caps. Baird said that the "plan strikes a balance between the perfection some environmentalists may be seeking and the status quo that some in industry seek to protect." In December 2007, Baird revealed in a plan that over 700 big-polluter companies, including oil and gas, pulp and paper, electricity and iron and steel companies, must cut greenhouse emissions by six percent between 2008 and 2010. The companies would also have to produce an annual report every May 31 that would include data regarding the level of greenhouses emissions produced each year. Baird's proposal has been met with approval from Canada's oilpatch executives, who described them as the toughest emission regulations in the world, and who feared that more stringent standards would stifle oil sands exploration. Ontario Premier Dalton McGuinty had been considerably less critical than his brother, federal Liberal Member of Parliament David McGuinty, having written to Prime Minister Harper on the environmental policy. The Premier had stressed the importance of a policy that considered the North American market as a whole, due to the automotive industry's importance to his province. McGuinty said the Conservatives' environmental plan could have gone further but described the auto emissions part of the plan as "very sensible".

Members of opposition parties have criticized the government's abandonment of the Kyoto goals, while David Suzuki described the proposal as a "sham" with "weak targets". Former US vice president Al Gore said Baird's plan was a "complete and total fraud" that was "designed to mislead the Canadian people". Baird responded by defending his plan and by criticizing Gore's environmental record, noting that no similarly stringent measures were passed during Gore's tenure in office and that the Kyoto Treaty was never submitted to the US Senate for ratification. Liberal Party MP Pablo Rodriguez introduced to the House of Commons a private bill that would have forced Canada to comply with the Kyoto Treaty in response to the government's plan. While the bill passed, Baird mentioned that, even though that the government wouldn't dismiss the idea, there were no new environmental measures planned. All three opposition parties demanded that the environment become one of the main points of the government's Throne Speech in the 2007 fall session.

==== Environmental record ====
Shortly after his appointment, Baird, Stephen Harper and Natural Resources Minister Gary Lunn announced $1.5 billion for clean-energy initiatives over the next decade. Baird and Lunn also announced a $230 million program for clean energy technology. Lunn said that "there were literally hundreds of programs but there was no focus" when the Conservatives took office. Critics argued that the new Conservative measures were similar to measures introduced by the Liberals in their 2005 budget. Former Liberal leader Stéphane Dion has argued that the Conservative Party's strategy is too strongly focused on nuclear energy.

On February 12, 2007, Baird appeared at a press conference with Stephen Harper and Quebec Premier Jean Charest to announce a $1.5 billion environmental fund for the provinces. Journalist Frances Russell criticized that as a reduction from the $3 billion promised by the previous Liberal government.

Canada is a signatory to the Kyoto Protocol which legally requires signatory countries to set up compatible carbon trading markets. In direct defiance of this international legal obligation, in March 2007, Baird indicated that he wanted Canadian companies to be banned, or at least severely restricted, from participating in the international carbon market. Several European countries had already set up a trading system to allow companies that reduce their emission levels below government targets to sell "credits" on an international market. Many industry leaders argued that Canada should adopt a similar policy. Then-opposition leader Stéphane Dion argued that participation will allow Canadian firms to make "megatonnes of money". Baird however described some carbon markets as "shaky," and argued that trade should be restricted to within Canada, or perhaps within North America. In April he indicated that Canadian businesses would soon gain the right to earn credits by investing in overseas environmental projects.

Baird defended another Conservative government decision to cut funds for climate science research, arguing that further studies are largely superfluous in light of recent United Nations reports. Gordon McBean of the Canadian Foundation for Climate and Atmospheric Sciences has disagreed, claiming that further research is the best way to adapt to a changing climate.

Baird said in a House of Commons Committee that his government would not consider the implementation of a carbon tax. He told that the government's approach "will be to provide regulation for industry to ensure we reduce both greenhouse gas emissions and reduce air pollutants"

==== Bali ====
While participating at the United Nations Summit On Climate Changes in Bali, Indonesia, Baird announced a $86 million funding to help Canadian communities notably coping with the loss of forests due to pine beetles in the west and of infrastructures in the north due to softer soil. The four-year plan included $56 million on several projects and $29 million for research.

Baird was criticized by some parties and observers for obstructing progress on what was to become 'the Bali Action Plan'. Baird showed up for the Bali Conference at which it was intended he explain Canada's position at a meeting with non-governmental activists, but instead quickly left, with one of the activists alleging that Baird left because he "probably did not want to confront young activists critical of Canada's stand."

=== Draft Baird Movement ===
In late November and early December 2008, a website went online allegedly representing a movement to draft Baird for leader of the Conservative Party, in the face of Stephen Harper facing possible defeat by an opposition coalition.

The draft group allegedly comprised over 100 party members from across the country—including two MPs and one Senator (who, reportedly, had requested anonymity). In its only contact with the media, the campaign claimed it had nearly 3,000 visitors and 237 new supporters in less than ten hours.

Baird indicated afterward not only that he was loyal to Harper, but that he was uninterested in ever becoming party leader. In 2011 he told a newspaper, "Some people may have when growing up, always harboured leadership ambitions. I've never harboured leadership ambitions. It is the honest-to-God truth."

=== Minister of Transport (2008–2010) ===
Baird served as Minister of Transport between October 30, 2008, and August 6, 2010.

==== Thatcher incident ====
In November 2009, Baird texted friends the message “Thatcher has died,” referring to his 16‑year‑old pet cat named after Margaret Thatcher. The text was misinterpreted at a Conservative fundraising gala in Toronto as an announcement of the former British prime minister's death, prompting aides to alert Prime Minister Stephen Harper and draft a condolence statement before contacting officials in London. The confusion was resolved when Buckingham Palace and 10 Downing Street confirmed Thatcher was alive.

=== 'Interim' Environment Minister 2010–2011 ===
==== Cancun climate 'fossil awards' ====
After resuming his environment portfolio from November 2010 until January 2011, Baird was the Harper government's main representative to the United Nations climate conference in Cancun in December 2010. On the first day, Canada "won" three Fossil of the Day awards, awards which, after a vote by more than 400 leading international organizations, go to countries that do the most to disrupt or undermine UN climate talks." Canada under Baird was accused of "working against progressive legislation to address climate change", cited for "cancelling support for clean energy and for failing to have any plan to meet its very weak target for reducing [Canada]'s greenhouse gas emissions."

=== Foreign Affairs Minister 2011–2015 ===
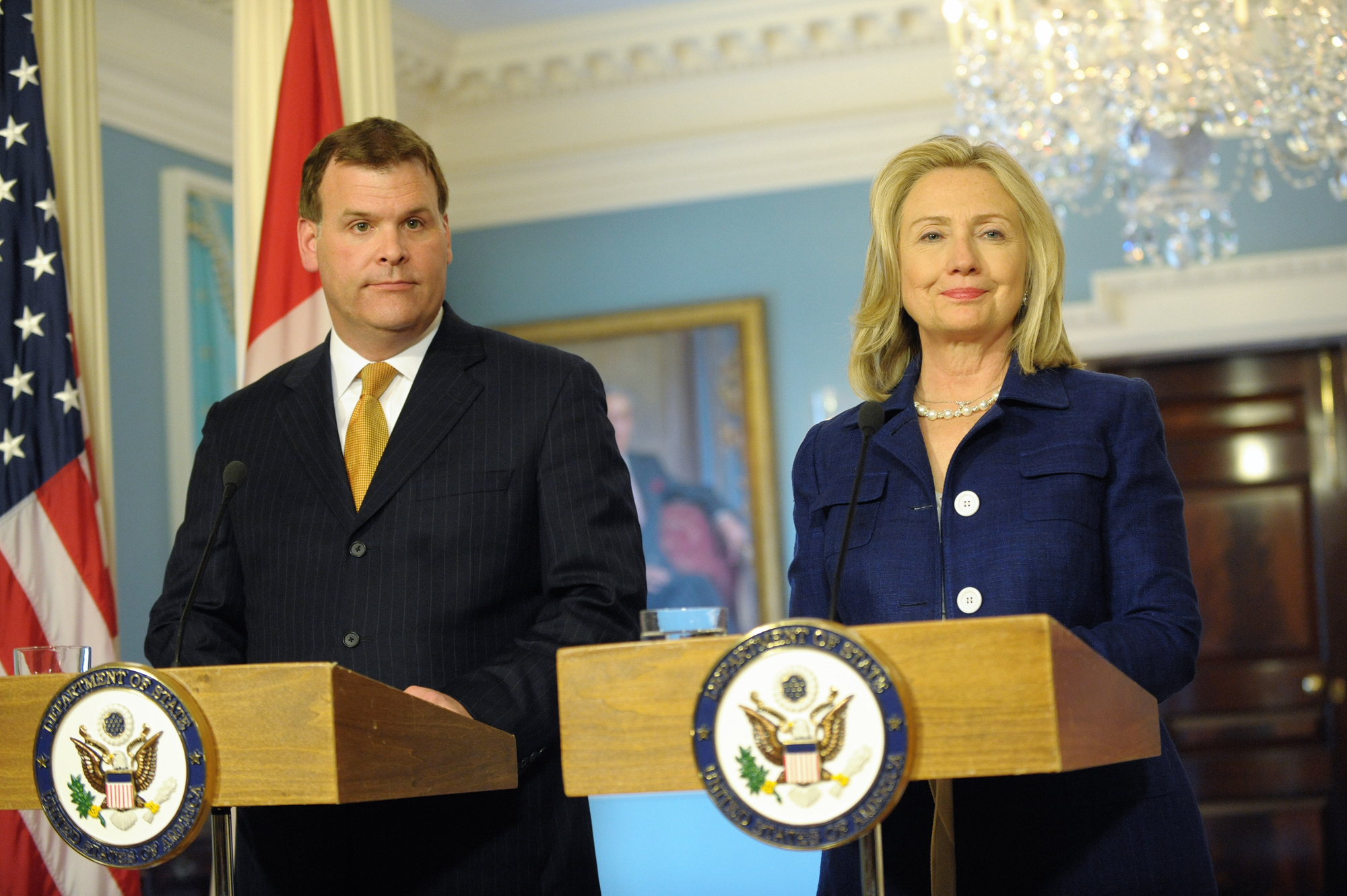
John Baird with U.S. Secretary of State Hillary Clinton in Washington, D.C., August 4, 2011

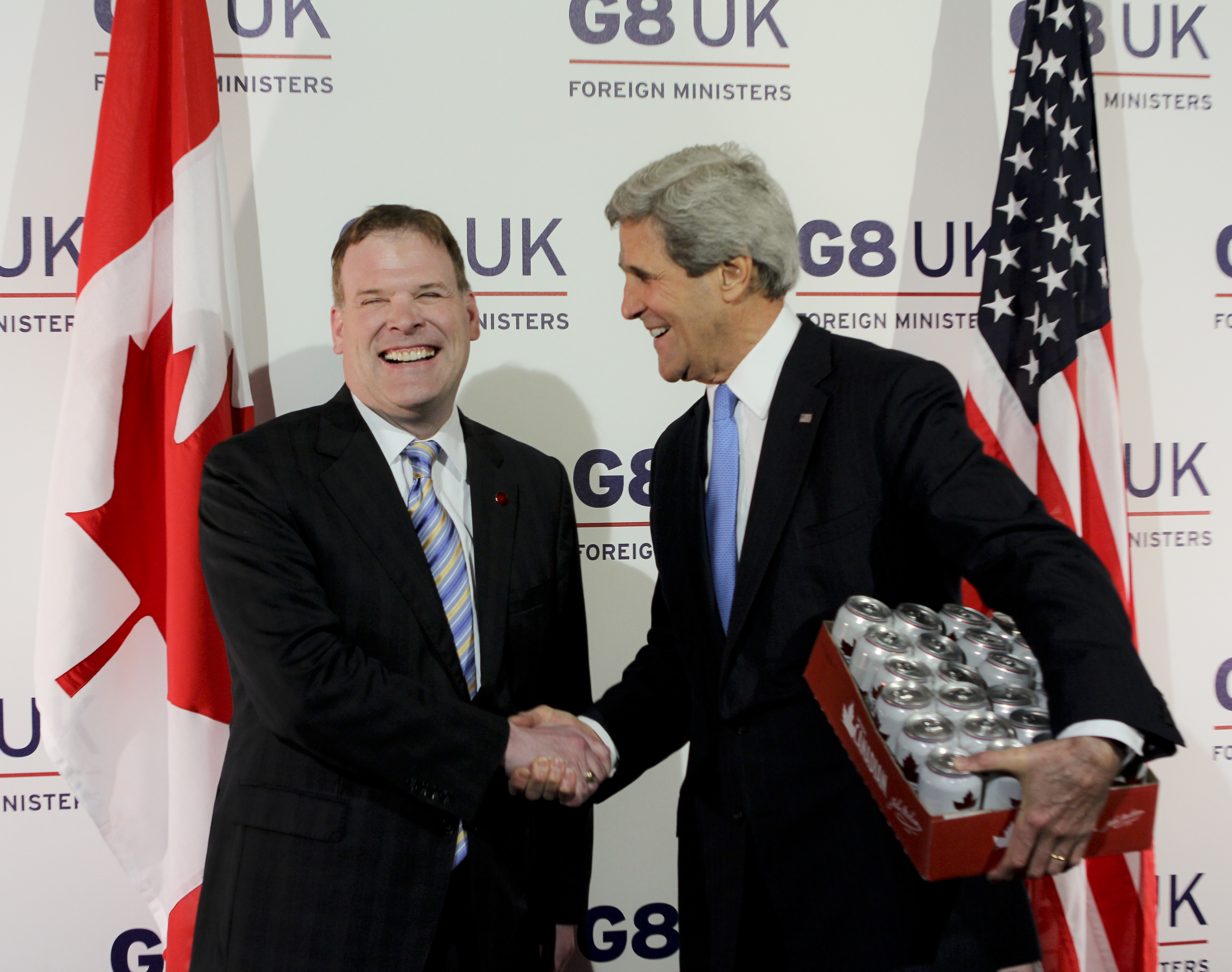
John Baird with Clinton's successor as U.S. Secretary of State John Kerry in London, United Kingdom, April 11, 2013

Activists on board a Canadian boat taking supplies to Gaza (which had been blockaded by the Israeli government to ensure that weapons and other contraband did not enter Gaza) in November 2011 urged Baird to resign as foreign minister for "failing to do his job". They said they had been roughed up and Tasered by Israeli forces and that "If minister Baird wants to put the interests of a far-right Israeli government before Canadians, he should apply for the job of Israel's ambassador". Baird affirmed Canada's support for Likud's opposition to Palestinian statehood while visiting Israel in February 2012.

On September 7, 2012, he announced the sudden closure of Canada's embassy in Tehran and the expulsion of all Iranian diplomats from Canada. Baird made the announcement at an Asia-Pacific Economic Cooperation meeting in Russia. He said Canada's decision was not linked to growing speculation of an imminent attack by Israel on Iran's nuclear facilities. Baird said "Canada views the government of Iran as the most significant threat to global peace and security in the world today." Canada's actions were immediately praised by Israeli Prime Minister Benjamin Netanyahu who described them as "bold leadership."

Baird signed an agreement between the Governments of the United Arab Emirates and Canada for cooperation in the field of peaceful uses of nuclear energy.

Baird's criticism of the stance of several African countries on same-sex rights and of the Russian Federation for its ban on "homosexual propaganda" and other moves to suppress LGBT rights have been condemned by the social conservative lobby group REAL Women of Canada which issued a statement accusing him of "abuse of office" claiming that "Mr. Baird's actions are destructive to the conservative base in Canada and causing collateral damage to his party." A spokesman for Baird's office replied stating "The promotion and protection of human rights is an integral part of Canada’s foreign policy."

Baird refused to sign the world Arms Trade Treaty, with the Canadian government reportedly ordering its diplomats to play a "low-key, minimal role" during negotiations and protect the rights of Canadian gun owners.

=== Resignation and departing public office ===
Following his resignation as Minister of Foreign Affairs, Baird remained a backbench MP for several weeks. On February 19, 2015, he represented the government at the re-opening of Canada House, the home of the Canadian High Commission to the United Kingdom. Baird's resignation from parliament took effect on March 16, 2015.

== Private sector ==
Since leaving politics, Baird has accepted several private sector appointments. In June 2015 he was hired as a strategic adviser to Hatch Ltd, an international engineering and consulting firm for companies in the resource industry. In October 2015 he joined political risk consulting firm Eurasia Group as a senior adviser, where he offers strategic insight to companies on how global politics affects business. He has also been hired as an adviser to Bennett Jones, and accepted an appointment to the board of directors of Canadian Pacific Railway.

On March 27, 2015, Barrick Gold Corp. announced Mr. Baird's appointment to its international advisory board, along with former U.S. Speaker of the House of Representatives, Newt Gingrich. No compensation details were disclosed in the filings.

In August 2018, Baird appeared on Saudi-owned TV station Al Arabiya to comment on the diplomatic dispute between Canada and Saudi Arabia and urged Prime Minister Justin Trudeau to fly to Riyadh to apologize in person to the Saudi royal family. NDP MP Charlie Angus called the appearance "stunning" and suggested that the Ethics Commissioner should investigate the incident.

== Later political activity ==
Following the 2019 federal election, Baird was commissioned by the Conservative Party to investigate and deliver a report analyzing the party's campaign and the reasons for its failure to win the election. When party leader Andrew Scheer resigned, Baird supported Pierre Poilievre's prospective leadership campaign, agreeing to be its campaign chair. Poilievre unexpectedly decided not to enter the campaign, however, and Baird was encouraged to run as a "true blue" candidate in his place. On February 13, 2020, Baird announced he would not be a candidate in the 2020 Conservative Party of Canada leadership election.

He endorsed Pierre Poilievre in the 2022 Conservative Party of Canada leadership election.

In 2024, Baird was listed as one of the top 25 most influential conservatives in federal politics.

== Electoral record ==
2011 Canadian federal election
Party	Candidate	Votes	%	±%	Expenditures
Conservative	John Baird	25,226	44.71	-0.27	$85,279.84
Liberal	Anita Vandenbeld	17,790	31.53	-4.59	$83,063.37
New Democratic	Marlene Rivier	11,128	19.72	+8.20	$27,580.67
Green	Mark Mackenzie	2,279	4.04	-2.32	$16,343.75
Total valid votes/Expense limit		56,423	100.00		$88,802.24
Total rejected ballots		292	0.51	–	
Turnout		56,715	69.42	–	
Eligible voters		81,693	–	–	
Conservative hold		Swing		-2.43	
Source: Elections Canada

2008 Canadian federal election
Party	Candidate	Votes	%	±%
Conservative	John Baird	25,109	44.98	+1.85
Liberal	David Pratt	20,161	36.12	+2.03
New Democratic	Marlene Rivier	6,432	11.52	-4.60
Green	Frances Coates	3,552	6.36	+1.42
Independent	David Page	415	0.74	+0.74
Communist	Alex McDonald	150	0.28	+0.28
Total valid votes		55,819		

2006 Canadian federal election: Ottawa West—Nepean
Party	Candidate	Votes	%	Expenditures
Conservative	John Baird	25,607	43.07	$73,697.79
Liberal	Lee Farnworth	20,250	34.06	$71,412.19
New Democratic	Marlene Rivier	9,626	16.19	$24,830.25
Green	Neil Adair	2,941	4.95	$974.79
Ind. (Ind. Conservative)	John Pacheco	905	1.52	$16,671.51
Canadian Action	Randy Bens	121	0.20	$620.00
Total valid votes		59,450	100.00	
Total rejected, unmarked and declined ballots		269		
Turnout		59,719	71.38	
Electors on the lists		83,662		
Sources: Official Results, Elections Canada and Financial Returns, Elections Canada.

2003 Ontario general election: Nepean—Carleton
Party	Candidate	Votes	%	±%	Expenditures
Progressive Conservative	John Baird	31,662	54.06	−8.25	$ 89,484.81
Liberal	Rod Vanier	20,878	35.65	+2.45	59,182.48
New Democratic	Liam McCarthy	3,828	6.54	+3.28	7,619.96
Green	Matt Takach	2,200	3.76		4,820.88
Total valid votes/expense limit		58,568	100.0	+15.69	$ 90,762.24
Total rejected ballots		263	0.45	−0.13	
Turnout		58,831	62.23	+1.21	
Eligible voters		94,544		+13.30	
Source(s) "General Election of October 2, 2003 — Summary of Valid Ballots by Candidate". Elections Ontario. "General Election of October 2, 2003 — Statistical Summary". Elections Ontario. "2003 Election Returns - Candidate and Association" ( Word'95 .doc files / – 3.05MB).

1999 Ontario general election: Nepean—Carleton
Party	Candidate	Votes	%	Expenditures
Progressive Conservative	John Baird	31,546	62.31	$60,150.37
Liberal	Gord Hunter	16,809	33.20	56,229.71
New Democratic	Craig Parsons	1,647	3.25	8,231.29
Freedom	Bill Frampton	386	0.76	0.00
Natural Law	Brian E. Jackson	239	0.47	0.00
Total valid votes/expense limit		50,627	100.0	$ 80,110.08
Total rejected ballots		294	0.58	
Turnout		50,921	61.02	
Eligible voters		83,448		
Source(s) "General Election of June 3 1999 — Summary of Valid Ballots by Candidate". Elections Ontario. "General Election of June 3 1999 — Statistical Summary". Elections Ontario. "1999 Election and Annual Returns - Candidate and Constituency Association Returns".

1995 Ontario general election: Nepean
Party	Candidate	Votes	%	Expenditures
Progressive Conservative	John Baird	17,510	49.66	$40,800.37
Liberal	Hans Daigeler	13,575	38.50	$45,021.83
New Democratic	John Sullivan	3,274	9.29	$15,380.57
Green	Frank de Jong	390	1.11	$0.00
Natural Law	Brian E. Jackson	259	0.73	$0.00
Freedom	Cathy Frampton	252	0.71	$2,307.70
Total valid votes		35,260	100.00	
Rejected, unmarked and declined ballots		363		
Turnout		35,623	64.97	
Electors on the lists		54,832		

All electoral information taken from Elections Canada and Elections Ontario. Italicized expenditures refer to submitted totals, and are presented when the final reviewed totals are not available.

The 1999 and 2003 expenditure entries are taken from official candidate reports as listed by Elections Ontario. The figures cited are the Total Candidate's Campaign Expenses Subject to Limitation, and include transfers from constituency associations.

== Footnotes ==
Legislative Assembly of Ontario
Preceded by Hans Daigeler	Member of Provincial Parliament for Nepean; 1995–1999	Constituency abolished
New constituency	Member of Provincial Parliament for Nepean—Carleton; 1999–2005	Succeeded by Lisa MacLeod
Harris ministry, Province of Ontario (1995–2002)
Cabinet post (1)
Predecessor	Office	Successor
Janet Ecker	Minister of Community and Social Services; 1999–2002	Brenda Elliott*
Special Cabinet Responsibilities
Predecessor	Title	Successor
Noble Villeneuve	Minister responsible for Francophone Affairs; 1999–2002	Carried over to the Eves Ministry
Margaret Marland	Ministry of Children and Youth Services; 2001–2002	Brenda Elliott*
Eves ministry, Province of Ontario (2002–2003)
Cabinet post (1)
Predecessor	Office	Successor
Chris Stockwell	Minister of Energy; 2002–2003	Dwight Duncan
Special Cabinet Responsibilities
Predecessor	Title	Successor
Carried over from the Harris Ministry	Minister responsible for Francophone Affairs; 2002–2003	Madeleine Meilleur
Special Parliamentary Responsibilities
Predecessor	Title	Successor
Gary Stewart	Chief Government Whip; 2002	Doug Galt
Chris Stockwell	Leader of the Government in the Ontario Legislature; 2003	Dwight Duncan
Parliament of Canada
Preceded by Marlene Catterall	Member of Parliament for Ottawa West—Nepean; 2006–2015	Vacant
28th Canadian Ministry (2006–2015) – Cabinet of Stephen Harper
Cabinet posts (6)
Predecessor	Office	Successor
Reg Alcock	President of the Treasury Board; 2006–2007	Vic Toews
Rona Ambrose	Minister of the Environment; 2007–2008	Jim Prentice
Lawrence Cannon	Minister of Transport, Infrastructure and Communities; 2008–2010	Chuck Strahl
Jay Hill	Leader of the Government in the House of Commons; 2010–2011	Peter Van Loan
Jim Prentice	Minister of the Environment; 2010–2011	Peter Kent
Lawrence Cannon	Minister of Foreign Affairs; 2011–2015	Ed Fast; Acting
