= Robert C. Mitchell =

Canadian politician

Bob Mitchell

Ontario MPP
- In office 1980–1987
- Preceded by: Sid Handleman
- Succeeded by: Hans Daigeler
- Constituency: Carleton

Personal details
- Born: July 4, 1931
- Died: June 16, 2007 (aged 75) Ottawa, Ontario
- Party: Progressive Conservative
- Occupation: Civil servant
- Portfolio: Minister without portfolio responsible for Science and Technology, May–June 1985

Robert C. Mitchell (July 4, 1931 – June 16, 2007) was a politician in Ontario, Canada. He served in the Legislative Assembly of Ontario from 1980 to 1987, and was a cabinet minister in the government of Frank Miller. Mitchell was a member of the Progressive Conservative Party of Ontario.

== Background ==
Mitchell was a communication officer in the Department of National Defence before entering political life.

== Politics ==
He served for nine years in municipal government, in the city of Nepean and the Regional Municipality of Ottawa-Carleton.

He was elected to the Ontario legislature in a by-election, held on November 20, 1980 for the Carleton riding. He defeated Liberal candidate Al Loney by 3,502 votes. He served in the legislature as a backbench supporter of Bill Davis's administration. Mitchell was re-elected in the 1981 election, defeating Liberal Hans Daigeler and New Democrat Judy Wasylycia-Leis by an increased margin.

When Frank Miller replaced Davis as Premier of Ontario on February 8, 1985, he appointed Mitchell as a minister without portfolio responsible for Science and Technology. He was re-elected in the 1985 election, defeating Daigeler by a reduced margin.

The Progressive Conservatives were reduced to a fragile minority government in the 1985 election. Mitchell was named as a minister without portfolio and Chief Government Whip on May 17, 1985, but accomplished little in this position before Miller's government was defeated in the house. In opposition, he served as his party's critic for energy.

Mitchell lost to Hans Daigeler in the 1987 provincial election, by 3,636 votes.

=== Cabinet posts ===
Miller ministry, Province of Ontario (1985)
Special Parliamentary Responsibilities
Predecessor	Title	Successor
Alan Robinson	Chief Government Whip; 1985, May–June	Joan Smith (Liberal)
Davis ministry, Province of Ontario (1971–1985)
Cabinet post (1)
Predecessor	Office	Successor
Gordon Walker	Minister of Consumer and Commercial Relations; 1982–1983	Robert Elgie

== Later life ==
On June 16, 2007, Mitchell died after a long battle with cancer. He was surrounded by friends and family at the time of his death. Coincidentally, Mitchell received his medical care at the Queensway Carleton Hospital in Ottawa, Ontario, which he had been affiliated with numerous times during his political career.
