= Vince Bevan =

Retired chief of the Ottawa Police Service

Vince Bevan OOM

Chief of the Ottawa Police Service
- In office January 1, 2001 – March 31, 2007
- Preceded by: Himself
- Succeeded by: Vernon White

Chief of the Ottawa-Carleton Regional Police
- In office April 2000 – January 1, 2001
- Preceded by: Brian Ford
- Succeeded by: Position merged

Deputy Chief of the Ottawa-Carleton Regional Police
- In office March 1998 – April 2000

Personal details
- Born: Vincent Thomas Bevan
- Education: Brock University; Ontario Police College; Canadian Police College; FBI Academy
- Profession: Police officer
- Police career
- Allegiance: Ottawa
- Department: Ottawa Police Service; Niagara Regional Police Service (until 1998)
- Service years: 1973–2007
- Status: Retired
- Rank: Chief of Police

Vincent Thomas Bevan OOM is a retired Canadian police officer who served as the chief of police of the Ottawa Police Service from April 2000 to March 2007. He led one of the largest police services in Canada and was one of only six Canadian chiefs in the Major Cities Chiefs Association.

== Career ==
Bevan began his career as a police officer in July 1973. Before moving to Ottawa in 1998, he was part of the Niagara Regional Police Service. During his career he had the chance to experience multiple assignments as uniform patrol, motorcycle patrol, special projects and criminal investigations. Bevan was also a member of the Emergency Task Force for five years. He was heading the Green Ribbon task force, notably during the period of the Paul Bernardo high-profile murders of two teenage girls, Kristen French and Leslie Mahaffy in the early 1990s.

In March 1998, he became deputy chief of the Operations Support division and in April 2000, he became chief of the Ottawa-Carleton Regional Police. In January 2001, he became the chief of the new Ottawa Police Service as a result of the municipal amalgamation.

In 2003, Vince Bevan was appointed an Officer of the Order of Merit of the Police Forces by the Governor General of Canada.

Vince Bevan holds a bachelor's degree from Brock University in business and politics. He successfully completed a number of courses at both the Ontario Police College and the Canadian Police College and holds certificates in police management studies, advanced police studies, and general police studies. He is also a graduate of the National Executive Institute at the FBI Academy in the United States.

Chief Bevan is an active member of a number of associations, boards and committees such as:

- Vice-president of the Canadian Association of Chiefs of Police
- Ontario Centre of Forensic Sciences Advisory Board
- Major Cities Chiefs
- Ottawa Big Brothers and Sisters
- Interfaith Ottawa
- Ottawa Distress Center
- United Way

On March 9, 2004, he admitted Ottawa Police's role in Maher Arar case of deportation and torture in Syria. The Canadian Commission of Inquiry, led by Dennis O'Connor, later revealed details about the Ottawa Police role in the affair. The final report exonerated Arar of all the accusations against him and pointed out to the role the police forces had in the case. On December 6, 2006, RCMP Commissioner Giuliano Zaccardelli resigned from his post as Commissioner effective December 15, 2006, following the Report of the commission.

In July 2006, Vince Bevan announced that he would retire as Ottawa's police chief, officially ending his term, on March 31, 2007. Durham Regional Police Service Chief and former RCMP officer Vernon White was appointed as Bevan's replacement.
