= Nepean—Carleton (provincial electoral district) =

Coordinates: 45.358°N 75.659°W

Ontario electoral district
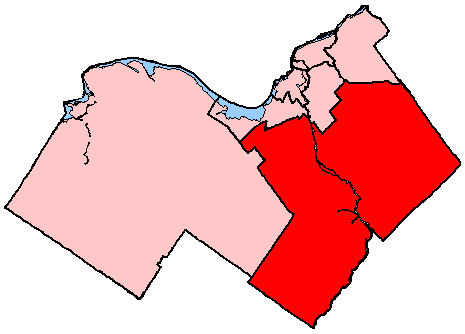
- Nepean—Carleton in relation to other Ottawa electoral districts

Defunct provincial electoral district
- Legislature: Legislative Assembly of Ontario
- District created: 1999
- District abolished: 2015
- First contested: 1999
- Last contested: 2014

Demographics
- Population (2006): 133,245
- Electors (2007): 97,757
- Area (km²): 1,178
- Census division: Ottawa
- Census subdivision: Ottawa

Nepean-Carleton was a provincial electoral district in eastern Ontario, Canada. It elected one member to the Legislative Assembly of Ontario from 1999 to 2014.

The riding was represented in the Ontario legislature by Progressive Conservative John Baird since it became a provincial riding in 1999 until he resigned in 2005 to run in the 2006 federal election. PC candidate Lisa MacLeod won the provincial by-election to fill the vacancy that was held on March 30, 2006.

Following the 2018 election, the district was dissolved into Nepean, Carleton, Orléans, and Kanata—Carleton.

== History ==
The riding was created in 1999, to match its federal counterpart. It was made up of 62% of Nepean, 43% of Carleton and 11% of Ottawa–Rideau.

== Members of Provincial Parliament ==
Nepean
Assembly	Years	Member	Party
Riding created from Nepean, Carleton, and Ottawa–Rideau.
37th	1999–2003	John Baird	Progressive Conservative
38th	2003–2005	John Baird	Progressive Conservative
38th	2005–2007	Lisa MacLeod	Progressive Conservative
39th	2007–2011	Lisa MacLeod	Progressive Conservative
40th	2011–2014	Lisa MacLeod	Progressive Conservative
41st	2014–2018	Lisa MacLeod	Progressive Conservative
Riding dissolved into Nepean, Carleton, Orléans, and Kanata—Carleton.

== Election results ==
2014 Ontario general election
Party	Candidate	Votes	%	±%
Progressive Conservative	Lisa MacLeod	30,901	46.77	–7.71
Liberal	Jack Uppal	21,974	33.26	+6.29
New Democratic	Ric Dagenais	8,628	13.06	–1.71
Green	Gordon Kubanek	3,630	5.49	+2.51
Libertarian	Coreen Corcoran	940	1.42	+1.02
Total valid votes		66,073	98.85	
Total rejected, unmarked and declined ballots		766	1.15	+0.80
Turnout		66,839	55.39	+5.48
Eligible voters		120,669		
Progressive Conservative hold		Swing		–7.00
Source: Elections Ontario

2011 Ontario general election
Party	Candidate	Votes	%	±%	Expenditures
Progressive Conservative	Lisa MacLeod	29,985	54.48	+4.20	$61,855.47
Liberal	Don Dransfield	14,844	26.97	–5.97	$20,300.63
New Democratic	Ric Dagenais	8,127	14.77	+7.34	$18,039.80
Green	Gordon Kubanek	1,641	2.98	–5.38	$2,855.87
Libertarian	Roger Toutant	223	0.41	–	$0
Freedom	Marco Rossi	217	0.39	–	$0
Total valid votes/expense limit		55,037	99.65	–	$131,703.25
Total rejected, unmarked and declined ballots		193	0.35	–0.16	
Turnout		55,230	49.91	–4.71	
Eligible voters		110,662			
Progressive Conservative hold		Swing		+5.08	
Source: Elections Ontario

2007 Ontario general election
Party	Candidate	Votes	%	±%	Expenditures
Progressive Conservative	Lisa MacLeod	27,070	50.28	–7.28	$58,239.69
Liberal	Jai Aggarwal	17,731	32.94	+1.50	$35,359.08
Green	Gordon Kubanek	4,500	8.36	+6.25	$3,130.46
New Democratic	Tristan Maack	4,000	7.43	–0.84	$11,543.93
Family Coalition	Suzanne Fortin	533	0.99	–	$0
Total valid votes		53,834	99.49	–	$107,004.24
Total rejected, unmarked and declined ballots		277	0.51	+0.07	
Turnout		54,111	54.61	+26.06	
Eligible voters		99,078			
Progressive Conservative hold		Swing		–4.39	
Source: Elections Ontario

Ontario provincial by-election, March 30, 2006 Resignation of John Baird to run federally
Party	Candidate	Votes	%	±%	Expenditures
Progressive Conservative	Lisa MacLeod	17,312	57.57	+3.51	$89,547.03
Liberal	Brian Ford	9,455	31.44	–4.21	$58,560.17
New Democratic	Laurel Gibbons	2,487	8.27	+1.73	$32,687.68
Green	Peter V. Tretter	634	2.11	–1.65	$852.94
Independent	John Turmel	112	0.37	–	$0
Freedom	Jurgen Vollrath	73	0.24	–	$0
Total valid votes/expense limit		30,073	99.55	–	$114,226.16
Total rejected, unmarked and declined ballots		135	0.45	–0.00	
Turnout		30,208	28.55	–33.67	
Eligible voters		105,802			
Progressive Conservative hold		Swing		+3.86	
Source: Elections Ontario

2003 Ontario general election
Party	Candidate	Votes	%	±%	Expenditures
Progressive Conservative	John Baird	31,662	54.06	–8.25	$89,484.81
Liberal	Rod Vanier	20,878	35.65	+2.45	$59,182.48
New Democratic	Liam McCarthy	3,828	6.54	+3.28	$7,619.96
Green	Matt Takach	2,200	3.76	–	$4,820.88
Total valid votes/expense limit		58,568	99.55	–	$90,762.24
Total rejected, unmarked and declined ballots		263	0.45	–0.13	
Turnout		58,831	62.23	+1.20	
Eligible voters		94,544			
Progressive Conservative hold		Swing		–5.35	
Source: Elections Ontario

1999 Ontario general election
Party	Candidate	Votes	%	Expenditures
Progressive Conservative	John Baird	31,546	62.31	$60,150.37
Liberal	Gord Hunter	16,809	33.20	$56,229.71
New Democratic	Craig Parsons	1,647	3.25	$8,231.29
Freedom	Bill Frampton	386	0.76	$0
Natural Law	Brian Ernest Jackson	239	0.47	$0
Total valid votes/expense limit		50,627	99.42	$80,110.08
Total rejected, unmarked and declined ballots		294	0.58	
Turnout		50,921	61.02	
Eligible voters		83,448		
Progressive Conservative pickup new district.				
Source: Elections Ontario

== 2007 electoral reform referendum ==
2007 Ontario electoral reform referendum
Side	Votes	%
First Past the Post	36,569	68.5
Mixed member proportional	16,821	31.5
Total valid votes	53,390	100.0
