= Huron Central Railway =

Railway in Ontario, Canada

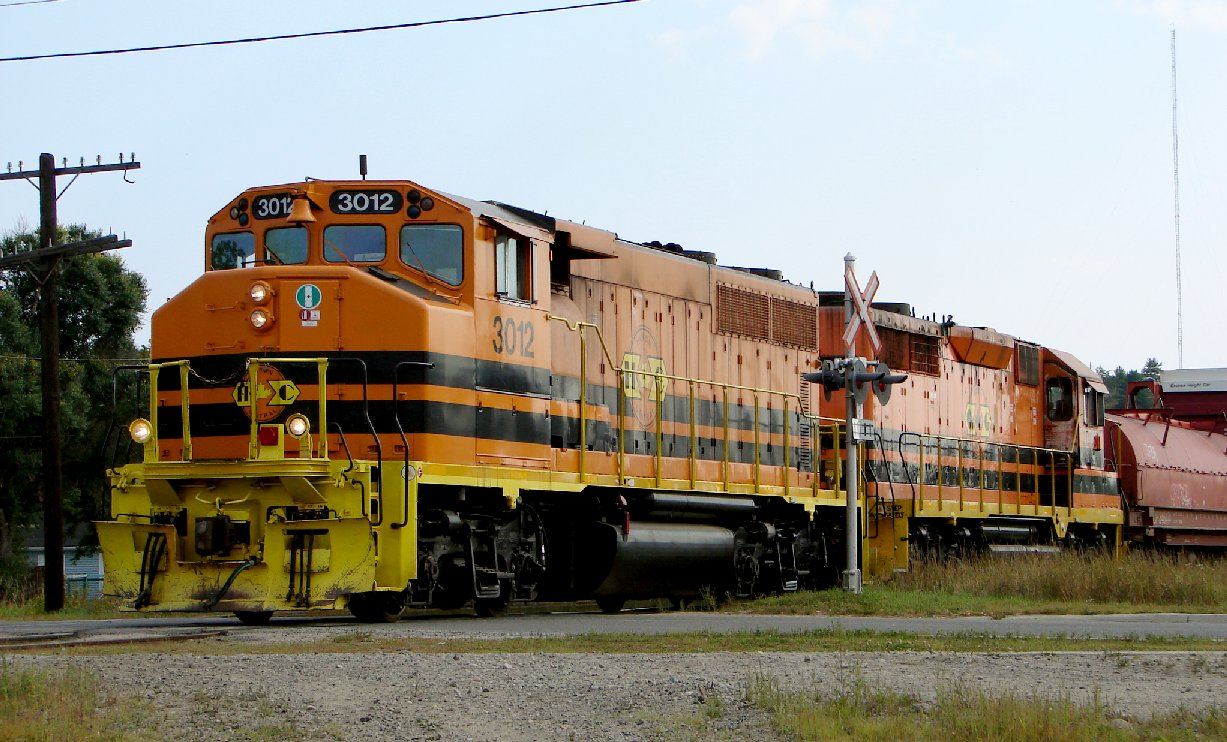
- HCRY train in Massey, Ontario

Overview
- Parent company: Genesee and Wyoming
- Headquarters: Sault Ste. Marie, Ontario
- Reporting mark: HCRY
- Locale: Northeastern Ontario, Canada
- Dates of operation: 1997–
- Predecessor: Canadian Pacific Railway

Technical
- Track gauge: 4 ft 8 1/2 in (1,435 mm) standard gauge
- Length: 196 miles (315 km)

Other
- Website: Official website

The Huron Central Railway (reporting mark HCRY) is a railway operating in northern Ontario, Canada. It is operated by Genesee & Wyoming Canada, the Canadian subsidiary of Genesee & Wyoming.

The Huron Central Railway was established in July 1997 to operate a 173-mile (278 km) route leased from the Canadian Pacific Railway (CPR) between Sudbury and Sault Ste. Marie, Ontario. The lease agreements encompass all but 4.8-mile (8 km) of track at the Sudbury end of the 181.2-mile (292 km) line, known within the CPR as the Webbwood Subdivision, as well as the 3-mile (5 km) Domtar Spur, which branches southwest from the Webbwood Sub at McKerrow. The CPR retains running rights over about 22-mile (35 km) of track at the east end of the Webbwood Subdivision, and the HCRY has running rights all the way into Sudbury.

Coil steel manufactured by Algoma Steel in Sault Ste. Marie and freight from the Domtar paper mill at Espanola account for 80% of freight traffic, although pulpwood, chemicals used by the steel industry, slab steel, paper, and miscellaneous goods are also carried. In 2008, the railway handled 16,000 carloads a year, though carloadings have decreased in subsequent years.

The route has variable topography and parallels Ontario Highway 17 for much of its length.

== History ==
=== Canadian Pacific ===
==== Origins and route ====
One of the terms of British Columbia entering into the Canadian Confederation in 1871 was the construction of a transcontinental railway connecting it with the original eastern Canadian provinces of Ontario, Quebec, New Brunswick, and Nova Scotia; this would result in a route through the largely-uncolonized Prairies, including the restive province of Manitoba, which had only recently been the site of the Red River Rebellion in 1869–70. Around the same time, amid fears of American expansionism north of the 49th parallel and border tensions resulting from the Fenian raids, American companies such as the St Paul, Minneapolis and Manitoba Railroad were pushing northward to connect Manitoba with the American Midwest and promoting cross-border trade along a north–south axis. One of the notable promoters of this effort was the Canadian-American railway industrialist James J. Hill, known as the "Empire Builder" and namesake of the modern-day Amtrak Empire Builder passenger train. Hill was the general manager of the St Paul, Minneapolis and Manitoba Railroad, and in 1880 became part of the Montreal-based five-man syndicate who were awarded the transcontinental railway contract by the Canadian federal government under John A. Macdonald's Conservatives, and subsequently formed the Canadian Pacific Railway Company. Railway construction had already been ongoing at the time under the previous Liberal government of Alexander Mackenzie, managed by the federal Department of Public Works and led by the renowned Scottish-Canadian engineer Sandford Fleming, who was dismissed in 1880 and replaced by Collingwood Schreiber as chief engineer on the project. Under Fleming's direction, the symbolic "first spike" had been driven at Fort William (now part of Thunder Bay) in 1875, and construction had commenced with the goal of connecting Winnipeg with the Lake Superior Lakehead in Northwestern Ontario.

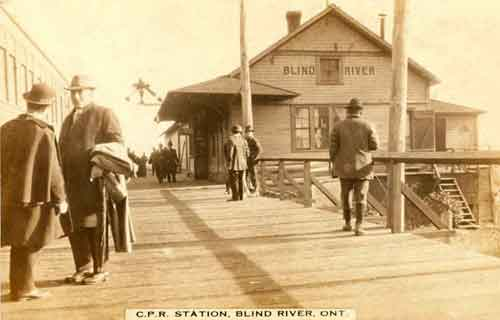
The Canadian Pacific Railway station in Blind River, Ontario, c. 1910.

Exploratory surveys had been conducted as early as 1871 along two prospective mainline routes connecting the Lakehead with the east: a direct inland route through the rugged terrain of the Canadian Shield (proposed by Sandford Fleming), and a "water route" which would use steamships to connect the Lakehead with a port on the north shore of Lake Huron, and then continue on via rail. The latter would pass through the newly formed Algoma District, paralleling the historic voyageur route through the North Channel of Lake Huron and connecting a number of pre-existing points or transportation corridors with the east:

- Sault Ste. Marie, which originated as a historic indigenous settlement populated predominantly by Ojibwe people
- Bruce Mines, which was settled in a copper rush in 1846
- Thessalon, which was historically inhabited by First Nations people, appeared on French maps as early as 1670, and was settled by Europeans as a lumber mill town in the 1870s
- Blind River, which originated in 1789 as a North West Company fur trading post at the mouth of the Mississagi River
- Spragge, the place of a meeting between Samuel de Champlain and local Ojibwe people, which developed into a mill town named Cook's Mills by 1882
- The Spanish River, a historic canoe route to the interior (with the CPR route bypassing the Fort La Cloche trading post near its mouth)
- Slightly to the north of the Hudson's Bay Company trading post at Whitefish Lake, which was established in 1824 at a key portage route near the Vermilion River and which marked a point along Salter's Meridian

Additionally, by passing largely to the north of the La Cloche Mountains, which divide the interior from the Lake Huron shoreline, the railway's route would pass through fertile lands with agricultural potential that were noted as early as the 1847 and 1848 surveys by the Scottish geologist and explorer Alexander Murray.

==== Construction of the line ====
Ultimately, Canadian Pacific would construct lines along both the northern inland and the southern lakeshore routes. At first, however, the company decided in favour of the southern route for its mainline, where the water route through Lake Superior was set to begin, and which was more accessible through existing means of transportation. This was supported by James Hill, as a line through Sault Ste. Marie into the United States would benefit his St Paul, Minneapolis and Manitoba Railroad, and open up the possibility of a joint Canadian-American transcontinental mainline through the Midwest. It was also initially the more practical, as the CPR was being faced with the challenge of transporting construction materials to the Lakehead to complete the line through the Prairies. This was done initially with steamships, which had already been operating on the Great Lakes for decades. By 1881, a line had been surveyed westward to Algoma Mills, where temporary port facilities were built out of expediency rather than using existing facilities at Sault Ste. Marie.

Construction work on the section began in 1882 under the supervision of CPR engineer Harry Abbott, but went slowly as crews carved a route through the rugged La Cloche Mountains; by the end of 1882, all 80 miles (130 km) had been graded, but only 5 miles (8 km) of track had been laid. It was completed in 1884, but was considered below standard by the CPR, with bridges constructed from local timbers rather than the steel necessary to support heavy freight. This was intended to be the temporary western terminus of CPR line from Montreal, but construction on the eastern portion of the line north of Lake Nipissing had proceeded extremely slowly under engineer James Worthington, and only reached the Vermilion River by the end of 1883, in the process passing through a concentrated pocket of Jesuit missionary activity which would coalesce into the parish of Sainte-Anne-des-Pins. Worthington also placed a junction and construction camp at a place nearby, which he named Sudbury.

==== Race to the Soo ====
The CPR was not the only company pursuing a link between Southern and Eastern Ontario and Sault Ste. Marie. Another interested party was the Midland Railway of Canada, a conglomerate formed out of smaller lines around Central Ontario. A shell company named the Ontario Sault Ste. Marie Railway was incorporated in 1881, and a line was surveyed for it. The Midland Railway, however, was insolvent and involved in a set of complex structural maneuvers which would eventually result in its amalgamation with the Grand Trunk Railway in 1893, putting the Midland in a poor position for further construction and dooming the new line to being a paper railway.

Also in 1881, the Northern Railway of Canada was going through its own complex reorganization, which would result in the incorporation of the Northern, North-Western, and Sault Ste. Marie Railway, which was to reach Sault Ste. Marie via North Bay through an extension of the Northern's existing line, which terminated at Gravenhurst. Construction began within several years, but the project lagged, and the line only reached Callander, just south of North Bay in 1886. Financing issues for the line caused a public scandal, and the goal of reaching Sault Ste. Marie was abandoned. Instead, Nipissing Junction was created as the new terminus, joining it with the Canadian Pacific line just southeast of North Bay, and the whole line was renamed to the Northern and Pacific Junction Railway. The Northern Railway of Canada collapsed soon after, and it was merged into the Grand Trunk Railway, which had, through agents and proxies, been involved in the operations of both it and the Midland Railway for some time. The Grand Trunk, seeing Canadian Pacific as its new rival following its own acquisition of the Great Western Railway in 1882, acquired numerous railways around this time and "depleted its treasury" in an unsuccessful bid to keep Canadian Pacific out of Ontario. Ultimately, the line as it was built would later come under Canadian National ownership and most recently forms part of the CN Newmarket Subdivision.

==== A change of course ====
Significantly, in 1883 and 1884 there had been a sea change at the CPR: an increasingly bitter James Hill resigned from the company, and became a major opponent of the company and its future president, William Cornelius Van Horne. On 1 May 1884, Worthington also resigned from the company after a disagreement with Van Horne and was replaced with Abbott as supervising engineer on the remaining eastern section of the mainline. In preparation for the opening of the new terminus at Algoma Mills, three steamships, the Alberta, Algoma, and Athabaska, had been built in 1883 by Charles Connell and Company of Glasgow. These ships began service in May 1884 from Owen Sound to Port Arthur, pending the opening of the line. By the end of 1884, however, this new mainline section had been suddenly downgraded to a branch line thereafter known as the Algoma Branch. Surveying and construction began on a new mainline route starting from the junction at Sudbury along a new route around this time.

During blasting and excavation along the new mainline a short distance to the north of Sudbury, high concentrations of nickel-copper ore were discovered by Thomas Flanagan, a blacksmith working for the CPR, at the site of what would become the Murray Mine. Organized copper mining had occurred on the north shore since at least as early as the foundation of Bruce Mines in 1846. The use of copper by First Nations people had been documented by Samuel de Champlain in the early 17th century, and there is significant archaeological evidence of copper working by the Mississippian people among others, who largely sourced their copper from the Great Lakes region. The western Great Lakes were the epicentre of the Old Copper Complex as early as 4000 BCE, with evidence of indigenous copper mining on Isle Royale from around this time. Geophysically, the presence of magnetic anomalies around the Sudbury Basin had been noted by Alexander Murray in his 1847–48 surveys. As well, in the course of charting his north–south meridian, Albert Salter observed "severe compass needle deflections" about 5 kilometres (3.1 mi) north of the Hudson's Bay Company trading post at Whitefish Lake. This drew little attention at the time, as the Sudbury area was located well inland and composed of rough terrain, and was less desirable than locations such as Bruce Mines or in Michigan's Copper Country. Within several years after the official discovery, however, mining activity had increased significantly in the Sudbury Basin, mostly by small companies which struggled with limitations in mining and smelting technology of the time. Nevertheless, this development would ultimately shift the economic focus of the region away from Sault Ste. Marie and toward Sudbury.

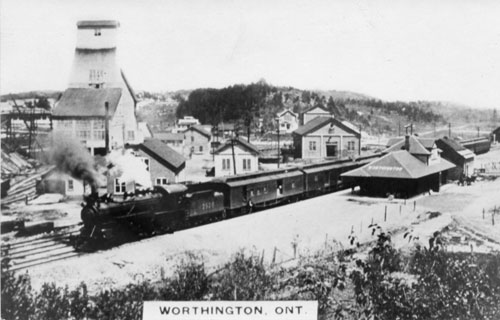
Worthington c. 1920. The mine headframe is visible to the left and the low-slung CPR station to the right.

With the new mainline still under construction, the Algoma Branch went disused until 1888, when it was brought up to standard and finally extended to Sault Ste. Marie, Ontario, with a symbolic "meeting in the middle" of eastbound and westbound trains at Whitefish in 1889. Around the same time, the CPR acquired the financially struggling Minneapolis, St. Paul and Sault Ste. Marie Railroad (MStP&SSM) through intermediaries. The MStP&SSM line had been extended up to Sault Ste. Marie, Michigan, and it and the CPR had jointly funded the construction of the Sault Ste. Marie International Railroad Bridge in 1887. This would provide a connection point with American railways in the Midwest, access to Sault Ste. Marie's industries, and the opportunity to open up the North Shore of Lake Huron to increased European settlement and natural resource extraction. Much like in other areas of Canada, townships were quickly surveyed and lots sold either to natural resource interests or to prospective settlers, including Québécois, Scots, and Finns. New or refounded settlements, concentrated heavily toward the east end of the line near Sudbury, sprung up along the line, including:

- Copper Cliff, which was officially founded in 1901 as a company town
- Naughton, which was founded in 1887 with the relocation of the Whitefish Lake Hudson's Bay Company post northward to be closer to the line
- Whitefish
- Victoria Mines, which developed around a mine site located north of the line along a specially-constructed spur
- Worthington, which developed around the Worthington Mine, staked out when Charles Francis Crean discovered copper traces when examining track ballast along the line
- Turbine, formed in 1890 as a decentralized farming community around the junction between the main Algoma Branch and the spur line leading north toward the High Falls hydroelectric power dam
- High Falls, a company town formed in 1904–5 around the nearby Huronian Power Company dam
- Nairn, originally known as Nelson and grew informally in the 1890s as a CPR town until it became a lumber mill town
- McKerrow, originally known as Stanley Junction in 1908 and later Espanola Station, formed around a junction station with the spur line diverging from the Algoma Branch south to Espanola
- Espanola, formed as a lumber mill town next to the Spanish River as a company town of the Spanish River Pulp and Paper Company
- Webbwood, formed in the mid-1880s as the main CPR divisional town along the line
- Massey, where a town coalesced around the CPR station within an existing decentralized farming community
- Walford, a CPR town formed within an existing decentralized farming community
- Spanish, originally known as Spanish River Station, which formed around the CPR line as a commercial centre in a mining and logging area
- Serpent River First Nation's Cutler Station area formed

In its first few decades, the line saw traffic primarily from the mining and logging industries, as well as local farmers in the Beaver Lake area exporting milk to dairies in Copper Cliff and Sudbury for processing. It also saw passenger traffic, including express trains connecting Sault Ste. Marie, Sudbury, and Toronto; notably, in 1910 an express train derailed while crossing the Spanish River near the town of Nairn, resulting in scores of deaths and going on record as one of the worst railway disasters in Canadian history.

==== Algoma Eastern line ====
The competing Algoma Eastern Railway was built in 1914 by the Sault Ste. Marie-based Lake Superior Corporation, which served a more primarily industrial corridor largely north of the CPR line in the east, though it did operate some passenger services. During the Great Depression, a number of dairy farms in the area were permanently shut down and mining and lumber operations reduced to skeletons or mothballed entirely. This drastically reduced traffic along both lines, and Canadian Pacific bought the Algoma Eastern line from the financially distressed Lake Superior Corporation. Over the next several decades, the Algoma Eastern line and rolling stock were gradually integrated into Canadian Pacific's operations and the Algoma Eastern name was retired. Much of the Algoma Eastern line was abandoned, and remaining portions were incorporated into the CPR Algoma Branch, which by that point had been reorganized as the Thessalon and Webbwood Subdivisions of the CPR, but was still known less formally as the "Soo Line". The decline along the eastern portion of the line was exacerbated by the Worthington mine disaster in 1927, when a mine shaft collapse destroyed a portion of the town of Worthington along with approximately 500 feet (150 m) of Canadian Pacific track, forcing the railway to permanently relocate its line around the crater left by the collapse as well as briefly rerouting its traffic along the Algoma Eastern line.

==== Highway development ====
Starting in the 1920s, efforts were made to build a modern highway connecting Sudbury with Sault Ste. Marie. This route had been surveyed along with the rail line in the late 19th century, and was displayed on some maps as the "Trunk Road", which a number of pioneer roads and industrial access roads connected onto. It also incorporated portions of old trails and portage routes, such as the one running parallel to the Serpent River. This road was largely unusable in certain seasons, and for decades the only way to cross the Spanish River aside from the train bridge was a local ferry service run out of Nairn. This situation would change during the Great Depression as government public works funding was made available for unemployed labourers to work in road construction, and it became easier for modern automobiles to travel through the area, especially after the highway was paved in 1931. This route became known as the "Soo Highway" and for several decades it was the primary highway connecting Sudbury with Sault Ste. Marie. During the 1950s, however, the Ontario provincial government began work on a new route running largely to the south of the Soo Highway, which would become Ontario Highway 17. This permanently shifted traffic away from communities near the CPR line like Turbine, High Falls, and Worthington, which quickly became ghost towns after experiencing a brief postwar economic revival due to the presence of the Soo Highway.

Factors such as this, as well as the arrival of Greyhound coach services, depressed passenger ridership and non-industrial freight along the line. Additionally, due to the lack of a north-south CPR corridor paralleling the Algoma Central Railway (which had been built by the Lake Superior Corporation and was later acquired by the Canadian National Railway, or CN), the line was never used for through passenger services to Northwestern Ontario and Western Canada, as the CPR transcontinental mainline to the north was used instead. Passenger service was drastically cut in the 1960s and almost every remaining station was demolished by Canadian Pacific in the 1970s and 1980s, and the line never experienced the nationalization of passenger rail services under Via Rail starting in 1977. Toward the end of the 20th century, the line became almost exclusively an industrial freight railway, serving a handful of high-volume customers such as the Espanola pulp and paper mill, the Nairn lumber mill and Essar Steel Algoma in Sault Ste. Marie.

=== Huron Central ===
With traffic declining, in 1997, Canadian Pacific leased the line to the Huron Central Railway, Inc., a subsidiary of Genesee & Wyoming.

The railway had been asking the provincial government since 2006 for funding to improve track conditions, and in April 2009, Genesee & Wyoming warned that, due to the ever-deteriorating track and the resulting increased operational costs, it would be forced to shut down the railway, unless the provincial government would provide money with which to undertake the necessary upgrades. On June 15, 2009, Genesee & Wyoming announced that the railway's operations would be discontinued by October and that 45 people would be laid off. Due to the economic downturn, it suffered a significant reduction in carload volume (down by almost 50% from the previous year) which rendered the line insolvent.

This announcement, however, triggered a series of negotiations between the HCRY, the City of Sault Ste. Marie, Essar Steel Algoma, and Domtar in order to keep the rail line open. A temporary agreement was reached which provided $15.9 million to cover operating expenses and maintain service until August 15, 2010.

On September 24, 2010, $33 million in funding was announced for the rehabilitation of the railway, with the provincial and federal governments each contributing $15 million and Genesee & Wyoming making up the remaining $3 million. Work began on August 10, 2011, with contracts going to Swift Contractors for tie replacement and track surfacing and M'Anishnabek Industries (a joint venture between B&M Metals of Sudbury and Serpent River First Nation) for ballast distribution. Work continues through summer 2012.

In May 2018, G&W announced that operations would cease by the end of 2018, citing a lack of provincial funding. Temporary funding was secured, but in October 2019, G&W announced the line would close in early 2020.

In early 2020, it was announced that G&W itself was being sold to Brookfield Infrastructure Partners and GIC Private Limited, the latter of which is the country of Singapore's sovereign wealth fund. Not long after this, in February, the closure of the Huron Central was officially postponed pending the possibility of further bailouts from the provincial and federal governments.

With no further government funds, G&W announced in September 2020 that the railway would be shut down on December 18, filing official notice to do so. In October, layoff notices were issued to all 43 railway employees, to take effect after the end of operations. It was announced on December 11, 2020, that due to ongoing negotiations with the Canadian federal government and the province of Ontario, that the deadline to close the line would be extended to June 30, 2021. All present employees with lay off notices, have had their notices rescinded for the time being.

G&W rescinded its plans to end its operation of the Huron Central Railway in the end of May 2021, following agreements with the provincial and federal governments to support the company via Transport Canada's National Trade Corridors Fund. Another threatened shutdown was averted by $21 million provided by the provincial and federal governments in January 2023, each matching a $10.5 million commitment by G&W towards infrastructure improvements. Both the provincial and federal governments had previously requested a plan from the railroad for business development to justify their funding. The investments are intended to support running heavier trains on the line.

=== Derailments ===
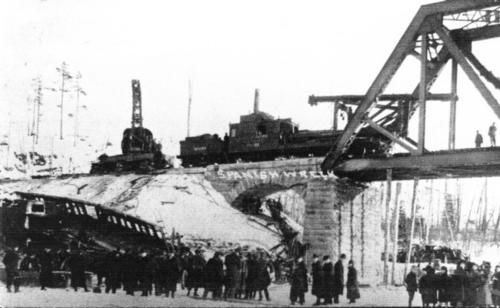
Aftermath of the Spanish River derailment.

The most notable derailment on the line, the 1910 Spanish River derailment, occurred when the line was still operated by Canadian Pacific. A westbound Soo Express passenger train derailed while crossing the Spanish River bridge near Nairn, causing the deaths of 44 passengers and crew.

On June 12, 2006, 15 cars carrying generators derailed near Webbwood. No injuries were reported, and no dangerous materials were involved, but a small brush fire had started from the derailment. The fire was later put out by the Sables-Spanish Rivers Fire Department.

On April 14, 2014, three locomotives and one flatcar were derailed likely due to collapsing infrastructure at milepoint 30 (about 3 km from Nairn Centre). There were no injuries; however, the spilled diesel from the locomotives required the issue of a drinking water advisory for the small community. The locomotives that derailed were QGRY 800, QGRY 3800, and HCRY 3011. QGRY 800 made it over the washout and sat upright with its rear truck off the tracks, QGRY 3800 ended up off the track and rolled onto its side, while HCRY 3011 remained upright, but sitting on its fuel tank at a 90° angle to the track with its rear truck hanging by the electrical cables.

On June 13, 2015, 15 cars left the tracks near Fairbanks Provincial Park in Worthington, which spilled steel coil. Ontario Transportation Minister Steven Del Duca requested a meeting with the federal Minister of Transport Lisa Raitt about rail safety in Ontario following the derailment. On November 1, 2015, 13 cars jumped the tracks near Spanish. There were no dangerous goods and no injuries. The Transportation Safety Board of Canada released a report two years later on March 8, 2017, citing drainage issues and rail joint defects as the cause of the derailment.

On January 1, 2017, 13 cars carrying steel coil derailed near Blind River. No injuries were reported, and no hazardous materials were involved during the derailment. The line was closed due to the incident until January 5.

== Locomotive roster ==
| Model | Maker | Numbers | Build Date | Remarks |
|---|---|---|---|---|
| Road Slug | EMD | 802 | 1967 | Nee B&O GP38 3813 |
| GP40-2LW | EMD | 3010 | Mar-1976 | Nee CN 9640 |
| GP40-2LW | EMD | 3011 | Mar-1974 | Nee CN 9403 |
| GP40-2LW | EMD | 3012 | Mar-1976 | Nee CN 9649 |
| GP40-2LW | EMD | 3013 | Apr-1976 | Nee CN 9646 |
| GP40-3 | EMD | 3802 | Dec-1968 | Slug mother to #802; née PC GP40 3246 |

Several locomotives lettered for Genesee and Wyoming affiliate Ottawa Valley Railway also populate the roster.

== See also ==
- Genesee & Wyoming
- Algoma Eastern Railway
- Soo Line Railroad
- List of Ontario railways
- Rail transport in Ontario
