= Wabagishik Dam and Generating Station =

- Location within Ontario
- Country: Canada
- Location: Walden, Greater Sudbury, Ontario
- Coordinates: 46.3156°N 81.5212°W
- Purpose: Power
- Status: Operational
- Construction began: 1908–1909
- Opening date: 1909
- Owner: Vale Limited

Dam and spillways
- Type of dam: Gravity dam
- Impounds: Vermilion River
- Length: 220.98 metres (725 ft)
- Spillways: 1

Reservoir
- Creates: Ella Lake (headpond)

Wabagishik Generating Station
- Commission date: 1909
- Type: Run-of-the-river
- Installed capacity: 3.74 MW

The Wabagishik Dam and Generating Station (or Lorne Falls Generating Station) is a concrete gravity dam and hydroelectric power plant on the Vermilion River. It is located within the former town of Walden in Greater Sudbury, Ontario, Canada. The complex is owned and operated by Vale Limited, which is notable in the area for its mining operations.

== History ==
=== Before the dam ===
People of the indigenous First Nations have inhabited the area for thousands of years. Groups such as the Ojibwe and Odawa used the Vermilion River as a transportation corridor, living in seasonal camps along its length and crossing troublesome sections, like falls and rapids, with portages. European colonization of the area formally began with the 1850 Robinson-Huron Treaty, and began to intensify after the construction of the Canadian Pacific Railway's Algoma Branch in the 1880s, running parallel and to the north of the river. Townships were surveyed along the line around this time, including Lorne Township, named after John Campbell, the Marquis of Lorne, who had recently been Governor General of Canada. The stretch of river in Lorne Township was soon the site of significant logging operations, as well as settlement by Finnish homesteaders.

At the same time, small mining operations had sprung up around the Sudbury area, facilitated by rapid technological changes, relative ease of extraction, and the logistical advantages created by the railway. Among these was the Mond Nickel Company, founded by the German-British chemist and industrialist Ludwig Mond. In 1900, Mond opened the Victoria Mine in Denison Township, which initially operated using cordwood boilers to produce steam power at the smelter. As a fuel source, however, wood was a quickly-depleting resource in the area due to extensive deforestation caused by logging, wood-burning, and clearance for new settlements.

Mond was a smaller competitor to the Canadian Copper Company, whose subsidiary, the Huronian Power Company (established by 1902), had developed the High Falls dam on the Spanish River to leverage hydropower for its mining and smelting operations. Mond would follow suit with its own competing subsidiary, the Lorne Power Company.

=== Construction and early operations ===
The Lorne Power Company's first major project was the Wabagishik dam at Lorne Falls. Dam construction occurred in either 1908 or 1909, and the plant was commissioned in 1909. By the end of the year, the generating station was connected to the Victoria Mine, which switched to electric power, though not soon enough to save the lives of two workers who had died in 1908 when a steam boiler exploded. The Lorne Falls plant was followed in 1915 by the Nairn Falls Dam and Generating Plant on the Spanish River, also owned and managed by the Lorne Power Company. Both plants provided 60 Hz power to Mond's operations, in contrast to the 25 Hz produced by Inco's Huronian Power Company.

In 1929, 20 years after operations at the plant began, the Mond company merged with the International Nickel Company, or Inco, which was the Canadian Copper Company's corporate successor. Not long after this, the Lorne Power Company was also merged into the Huronian Power Company, bringing its pair of plants under Huronian management. By 1952, Huronian was managing five main plants: the Lorne pair as well as three of its own construction, and still operating parallel 25 Hz and 60 Hz distribution networks. The 60 Hz power from the former Lorne plants was being supplied to the Garson Mine, Lawson quarry, and the smelters at Creighton, Copper Cliff, and Coniston.

=== Recent history ===
In the mid-2010s, safety inspections revealed deterioration of the concrete of the spillway, which was causing safety and stability issues with the dam. A 2016 assessment resulted in a "moderate" hazard potential rating, and rehabilitation of the existing spillway structure was discounted due to the level of deterioration, resulting in a decision to replace the original spillway. The dam owner, Vale Limited, conducted a number of surveys of fish populations around the dam, which included minnows, perch, pike, suckers, sunfish, bullheads, and walleye. Other species identified as being potentially affected by construction work included painted and snapping turtles, as well as seven species of bat. Ultimately, a minimum flow provision was added to the spillway replacement project to improve walleye spawning conditions at the base of the spillway, along with a post-construction monitoring program and a staged timeline of bush clearing recommended to minimize the impact on bat habitat.

== Geography and hydrography ==
The dam sits on the Vermilion River, downstream from Ella Lake (which is the dam's headpond) and upstream from Wabagishik Lake. It is located in the geographic Lorne Township, Concession No. 3, Lot No. 8, within the boundaries of the former town of Walden, now a part of Greater Sudbury in Northeastern Ontario, Canada. The nearest sizable communities are Lively to the east and Nairn Centre to the west; the nearest city is Sudbury to the east, whose municipal boundaries the complex falls within.

== See also ==
- Nairn Falls Dam and Generating Plant
- List of generating stations in Ontario
- Mond Nickel Company
- Vale Limited
