= Nairn Falls Dam and Generating Plant =

- Location within Ontario
- Country: Canada
- Location: Nairn and Hyman township, Ontario
- Coordinates: 46.3444°N 81.5733°W
- Purpose: Power
- Status: Operational
- Construction began: 1914
- Opening date: 1915
- Owner: Vale Limited

Dam and spillways
- Type of dam: Gravity dam
- Impounds: Spanish River
- Length: 39.01 metres (128 ft)
- Spillways: 2

Nairn Falls Generating Station
- Commission date: 1915
- Type: Run-of-the-river
- Installed capacity: 4.75 MW

The Nairn Falls Dam and Generating Plant (or Huronian Power Plant) is a hydroelectric dam and power plant located on the Spanish River to the northeast of the community of Nairn in Nairn and Hyman Township, Ontario, Canada. It is located approximately 50 kilometres west of Sudbury. It is owned and operated by Vale Limited, notable in the area for its mining operations. The power from the plant is primarily supplied to these operations, with excess power sold to Ontario Hydro. The generating plant works in conjunction with High Falls Dams No. 1 and 2, as well as the 'Big Eddy' generating plant, in a cascade system, where excess water power from upstream dams is utilized by the downstream ones.

== History ==
=== Early history ===
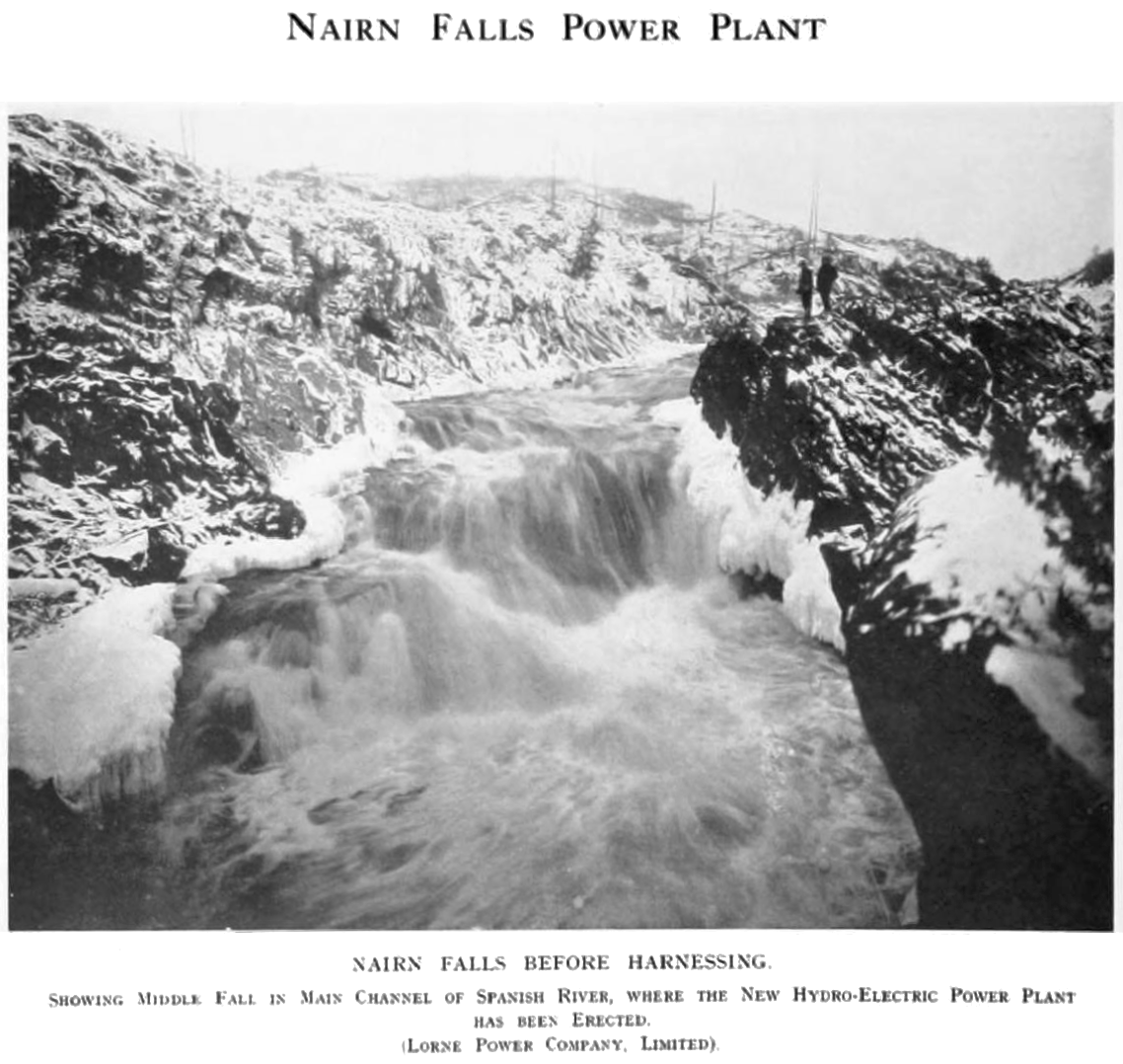
Nairn Falls before construction had begun.

Before the period of European colonization, the Spanish River was used as a transportation corridor by the indigenous people of the First Nations (primarily the Ojibwe) as an important route connecting Lake Huron's North Channel to the area now known as Sudbury, as well as many areas deep in the continental interior of Northern Ontario. People would migrate up and down the river seasonally, spending summers closer to the river mouth in the south, and migrating north to winter camps at Biscotasing.

With the advent of railways in the Manitoulin-North Shore region, it became increasingly practical to develop resource extraction industries in the area for export. Logging operations upstream would send logs downstream to be processed at Nairn and Espanola and ultimately be shipped out by rail. As rail corridors in the area matured, logging operations gradually ceased using the river for transportation and instead began to use the railways; this was cemented by the creation of a number of power plants along the river, starting with High Falls in 1904.

=== Dam construction ===
The Nairn Falls dam was constructed by the Mond Nickel Company. A rival of the more powerful International Nickel Company (Inco), the company had rapidly developed a number of mine sites and company towns to the west of Sudbury, many of which were served by the Algoma Eastern Railway and Canadian Pacific Railway lines, which ran roughly parallel to each other, with the AER to the north and the CPR to the south in that section. Both lines served a mixture of pre-existing communities and company towns for both Inco and Mond. The two lines crossed each other just west of Nairn, then paralleled each other before crossing the Spanish River.

The development of railway infrastructure passing through otherwise undeveloped Canadian bush created the opportunity for power lines to be erected, allowing an electrical corridor to be created running down the line to mine sites like Victoria Mines, the Crean Hill mine, and the Worthington mine. The AER line was routed more closely to the Spanish River, creating engineering challenges due to the rough geography around the river, but also creating some opportunities.

With the outbreak of the First World War, the market for nickel grew dramatically and Mond began to step up production at its mine sites. There was mounting pressure to establish a new wave of power plants which could power the mines and smelters, which were in the process of converting from steam to electric power. Nairn Falls was a convenient site, already located near the AER line and relatively close to the existing mining operations.

Construction began in 1914 and was completed in 1915, "all but [obliterating]" the small pre-existing waterfall. The power plant became operational later that year, and was managed under a Mond Company subsidiary known as the Lorne Power Company, which also managed the Lorne Falls power plant, built in 1909 on the Vermilion River. Both plants provided 60 Hz power to Mond's operations, in contrast to the 25 Hz produced by Inco's Huronian Power Company.

=== Early operations ===
The plant complex employed four full-time workers, with one relief worker for holidays. Despite being only a short distance from Nairn, which had by then grown into a mature railway town and primary point of access to the outside world, a small town site was laid out, consisting of two three-bedroom houses, as well as the "club house", which was run by a live-in cook and which served as a boarding house for maintenance workers. The powerhouse at the dam was the very first local telephone service subscriber in April 1917 and as a result was assigned a phone number of 1.

During the 1920s, the Mond Company began to decline, a process which was accelerated by the catastrophic collapse of the Worthington mine. The company and its assets were merged into Inco, and its power generation subsidiary, the Lorne Power Company, was merged into Inco's Huronian Power Company.

In 1930, the Algoma Eastern Railway was acquired by the CPR, which quickly began to abandon sections of the railway which paralleled its own track and which were considered to be redundant. The track from Espanola to Turbine (aside from the Little Current spur) was abandoned in 1931, including the section which ran next to the plant. The plant gradually became more secluded and separated from the nearby communities, especially as Inco abandoned the on-site worker housing and switched to using general operational and maintenance crews, and as rail traffic, including passenger rail, ceased along the old AER line.

The Second World War brought increasing concern and paranoia of German saboteurs. This was largely a renewal of the anti-German sentiment of the First World War, which brought suspicion and persecution onto ethnic German civilians living in Canada. Security generally increased at major industrial complexes, railways, canals, and harbours. As a precaution, Inco hired four armed security guards, two full-time and two relief, who patrolled the Spanish River dam complexes. No form of sabotage ever took place.

By 1952, Nairn Falls was powering operations at Garson mine, Lawson quarry, Creighton, and the Copper Cliff and Coniston smelters.

== Status ==
Today, the power plant continues to operate and supply power to Vale operations around Sudbury, as well as to the Ontario Hydro power grid. The Spanish River remains popular with cottagers and boaters, but the area around the plant is off-limits and remains Vale private property. The right-of-way of the defunct Algoma Eastern Railway near the plant has been divided up, with the bush allowed to regrow over some portions of the raised track bed, but another section has been used as an access road for the plant. This road intersects with Ferry Street in the town of Nairn, which marks the road to the former ferry service across the Spanish River to the "Headquarters" area to the north.

The area around the river, which was once completely logged out, began to see tree regrowth and reforestation throughout the latter part of the 20th century, which has given the area its current character and increased its recreational and wilderness appeal. This also serves to obscure the plant from view, especially as it is some distance both from the town of Nairn and the current Ontario Highway 17 route, though it is only a short distance from the old Highway 17 (now McIntyre Street). The plant and associated falls area are visible from the Spanish River itself, especially downstream.

== See also ==
- List of generating stations in Canada
- List of generating stations in Ontario
