= Agnew Lake (Ontario) =

- Location within Ontario
- Location: Sudbury District, Ontario, Canada
- Coordinates: 46°21′19″N 81°45′39″W
- Type: Reservoir
- Primary inflows: Spanish River, John Creek
- Primary outflows: Spanish River
- Basin countries: Canada
- Max. length: 36 km (22 mi)
- Surface area: 2,940 ha (7,300 acres)
- Average depth: 12.1 m (40 ft)
- Max. depth: 39.6 m (130 ft)
- Shore length^{1}: 210 km (130 mi)
- Surface elevation: 262 m (860 ft)
- ^{1} Shore length is not a well-defined measure.

Agnew Lake is a lake on the Spanish River in the Sudbury District, Ontario, Canada. Its area is 2,940 hectares (7,300 acres) and its shoreline is 210 kilometres (130 mi) long.

The lake is located primarily in the municipalities of Sables-Spanish Rivers, Baldwin and Nairn and Hyman, although its easternmost end enters the city limits of Greater Sudbury near High Falls. It is formed by the 353.57 metres (1,160.0 ft) long and 44.50 metres (146.0 ft) high Big Eddy Dam, built in 1920, and serves as the reservoir for several hydroelectric power stations downstream.

The lake has been the site of varied mining activity, including drilling for diamonds in the earlier half of the 20th century and for uranium from 1977 to 1983 at Agnew Lake Mine.

The lake was named after John Lyons Agnew, who became president and general manager of INCO in 1921.

== Fauna ==
Fish species found in Agnew Lake include:

- Burbot
- Lake whitefish
- Northern pike
- Smallmouth bass
- Rock bass
- Walleye
- White sucker
- Yellow perch

Northern pike, smallmouth bass, and walleye have consumption advisories due to mercury contamination.

== See also ==
- List of lakes in Ontario
