= Victoria Mines, Ontario =

Ghost town in Greater Sudbury, Ontario

Victoria Mines
- Ghost town
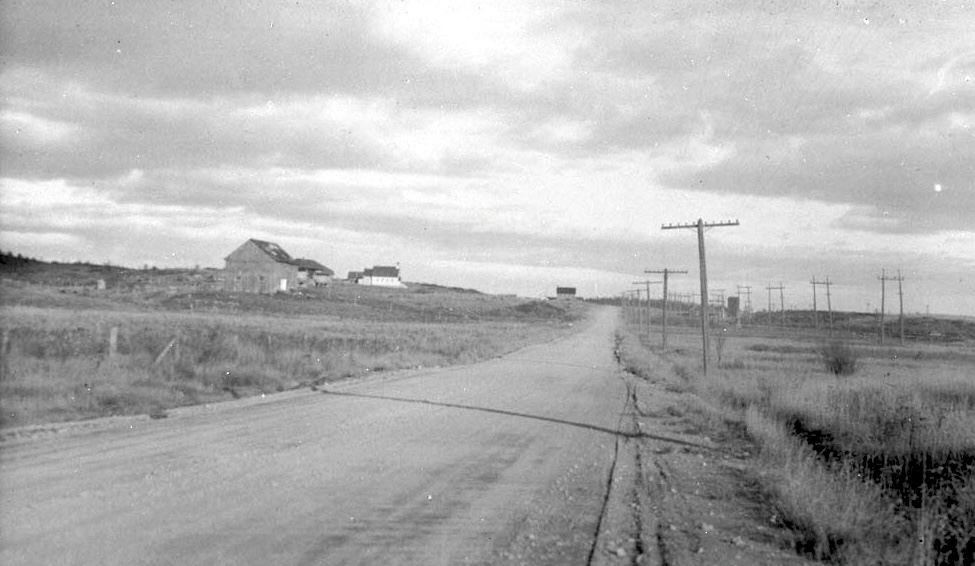
- Victoria Mine in 1933
- Interactive map of Victoria Mines
- Country: Canada
- Province: Ontario
- City: Greater Sudbury
- Ward: 2
- Established: 1901
- Abandoned: 1913 (Victoria Mine); 1923 (Mond)
- Time zone: UTC−05:00 (EST)
  - Summer (DST): UTC−04:00 (EDT)

Victoria Mines, also called Victoria Mine, was a mining settlement and company town of the Mond Nickel Company in Greater Sudbury, Ontario, Canada. Victoria Mine was located to the west of Whitefish on Fairbank Lake Road in the former municipality of Walden.

The settlement, along with the community of Mond, were established in 1899 for employees of Victoria Mine and the nearby smelter. With the closure of the smelter in 1913 and the mine in 1923, both towns were abandoned and the last house was removed from Mond in 1936.

== History ==
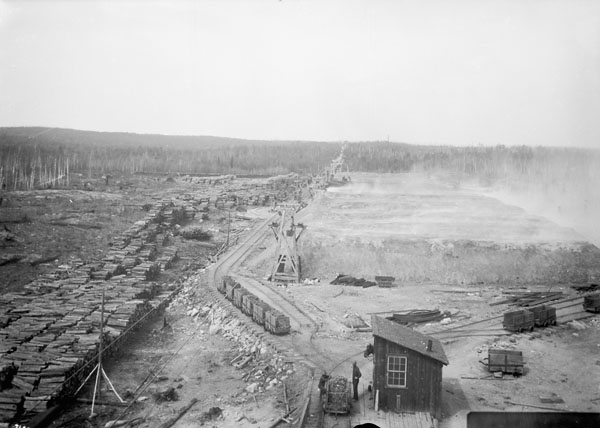
Roast Bed at Victoria Mine

Victoria Mines and Mond were established by German-born British chemist and industrialist Ludwig Mond as company towns for the Mond Nickel Company in 1899. The mine itself was originally prospected in 1886 by Henry Ranger. Mond, having created the Mond process for extracting and purifying nickel in 1890, purchased the mine site in 1899 to ship the ores to a refinery in Clydach, Wales. Operations at the mine began in February of 1901, with production reaching 5,000 tons per month by 1915. The mine would become the deepest in Ontario in 1919, with a depth of 3,012 feet (918 m).

2 miles (3.2 km) south of the mine was the smelter and roast yard, located near the settlement of Victoria Mines. The smelter and roast yard processed ores from Victoria Mine as well as the Garson and Worthington mines. With the completion of the Wabageshik hydrolectric dam in 1909, the smelter was converted from steam power to electric, increasing the capacity from 60,000 tons of ore per year to 140,000. The mine, roast yard and smelter were connected by an 11,400 feet (3,500 m) Trenton-Bleichert aerial tramway. Samples from the mine contained a mix of minerals, including Pyrrhotite, Pentlandite, Chalcopyrite, Sperrylite and Scheelite, and 805,580 tons of ore were produced between 1900 and 1923.

=== Mond ===
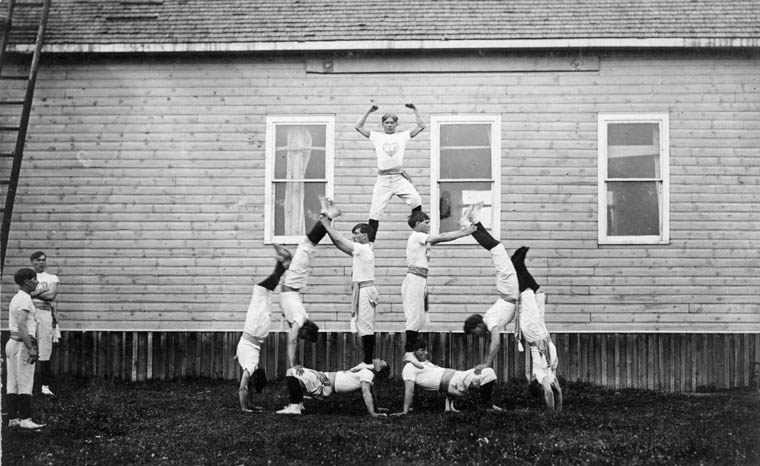
The Mond Finnish Athletic Society

Mond was located adjacent to the mine, north of the Algoma Eastern line. The population of Mond was diverse, with Finnish, Ukrainian, Polish, Italian, French, and British residents. The diversity of the community, including its linguistic diversity, was reflected in the organization of miners. For example, a Finnish shift supervisor, Matti Manninen, mainly supervised Finns on his shift. Mond had two general stores, a two-room school, public sauna, and community halls for the Finnish, Ukrainian, and Slovak communities.

=== Victoria Mine ===
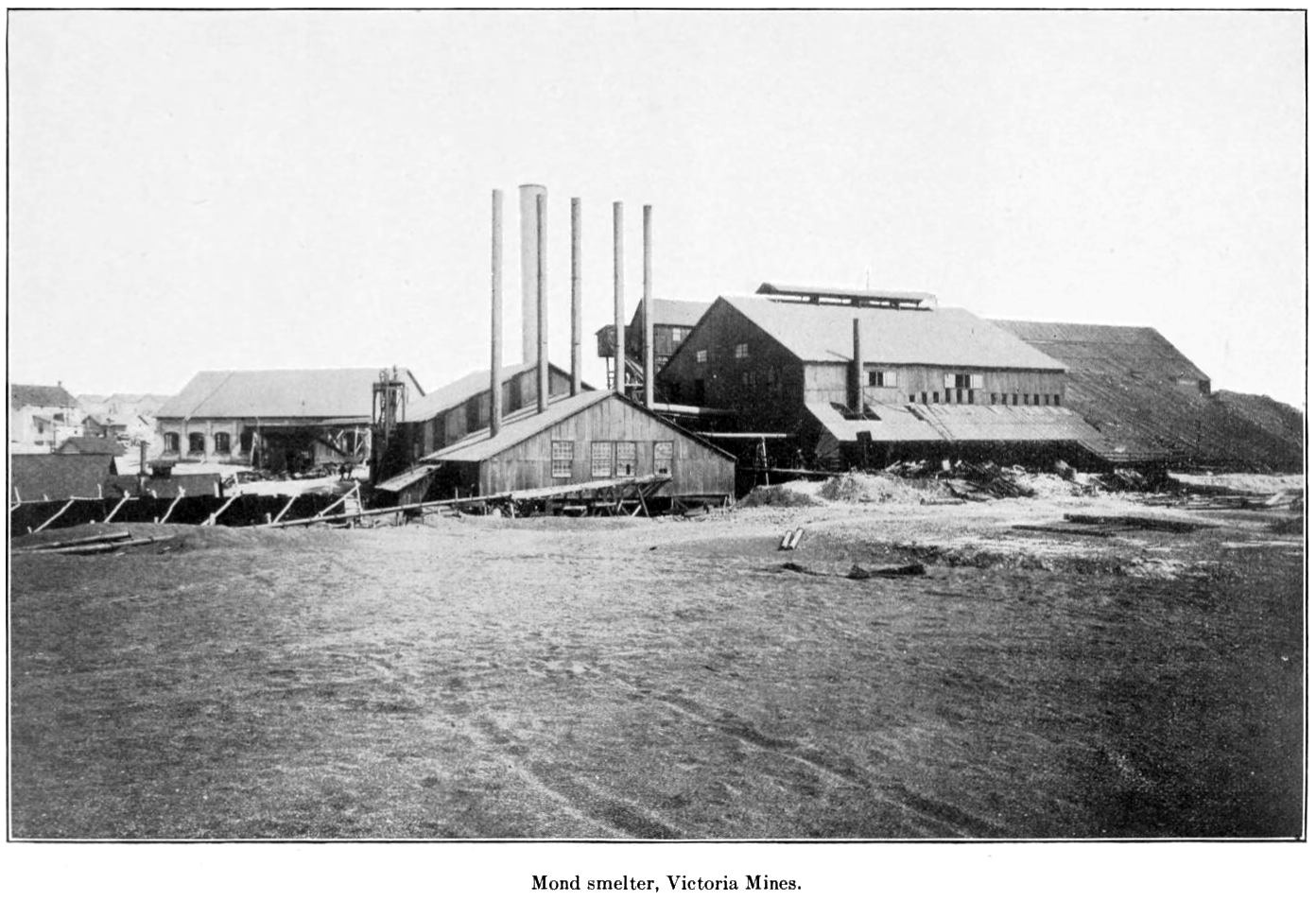
Victoria Mine smelter

Victoria Mine had an approximate population of 500 at its peak. The community was laid out to the north of the Canadian Pacific line, with a station built in 1904. Victoria Mine had an assortment of businesses and services, including a butcher shop, barbershop, dry goods and grocery retailers, a bowling alley, a Roman Catholic church, a Presbyterian church, and public and separate schools. Housing at the town included an apartment building, three boarding houses, and fifty single dwellings. Much like Mond, Victoria Mines had a diverse community, including a small Italian area.

== Abandonment ==
Starting in the early 1910s, Mond Nickel began to expand its operations around the Sudbury area, and the output of Garson Mine began to surpass that of Victoria Mine. The smelter at Victoria Mine was deemed to be too distant from Monds higher output mine, and a new smelter was opened in Coniston in 1913. In the same year, the Victoria Mines smelter was closed, and many of the smelter employees relocated to Coniston. Numerous buildings were dismantled and moved by rail to Coniston or Worthington, including the Anglican and Presbyterian churches which still stand in Coniston. The public school closed in 1914, and the remaining students from Victoria Mine attended school in Mond. Although several residents remained at Victoria Mines, none of the structures remain today.While the smelter closed in 1913, Victoria Mine continued operating until 1923. With the closure of the mine, Mond was also abandoned. The last house at Mond was removed in 1936.

== See also ==
- List of ghost towns in Ontario
- Walden, Ontario
