= Rapid River (Sudbury District) =

- Location of the mouth of the Rapid River in Ontario

Location
- Country: Canada
- Province: Ontario
- Region: Northwestern Ontario

Physical characteristics
- Source: Unnamed marsh
  - location: Unorganized Sudbury, Sudbury District
  - coordinates: 46°53′10″N 81°09′36″W
  - elevation: 430 m (1,410 ft)
- Mouth: Vermillion River
  - location: Greater Sudbury
  - coordinates: 46°41′10″N 81°01′23″W
  - elevation: 282 m (925 ft)

The Rapid River is a river in Sudbury District and Greater Sudbury in Northwestern Ontario, Canada. It begins at an unnamed marsh, at an elevation of 430 metres (1,411 ft) and just upstream of Osbourne Lake, in Unorganized Sudbury, Sudbury District. It travels south to its mouth at the Vermillion River at an elevation of 282 metres (925 ft), near the community of Val Thérèse in Greater Sudbury.

== See also ==
- List of rivers of Ontario
