= Nairn and Hyman =

- Township (single-tier)
- Township of Nairn and Hyman
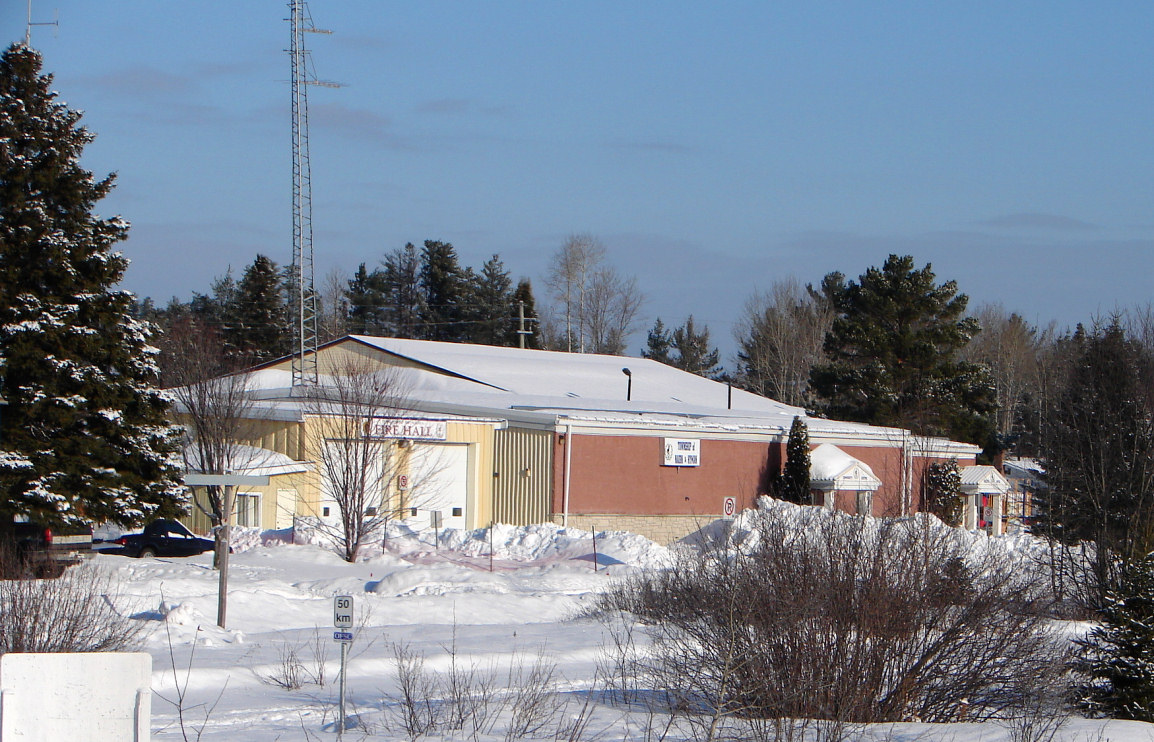
- Municipal buildings in Nairn Centre

- Location within Ontario
- Coordinates: 46°21′N 81°38′W
- Country: Canada
- Province: Ontario
- District: Sudbury
- Incorporated: January 1, 1998

Government
  - Type: Township
  - Mayor: Amy Mazey
  - MP: Jim Belanger (Conservative)
  - MPP: Bill Rosenberg (PC)

Area
  - Total: 159.18 km^{2} (61.46 sq mi)

Population (2021)
  - Total: 373
  - Density: 2.3/km^{2} (6.0/sq mi)
- Time zone: UTC-5 (EST)
  - Summer (DST): UTC-4 (EDT)
- Area codes: 705, 249
- Highways: Highway 17 / TCH
- Website: www.nairncentre.ca

Nairn and Hyman is a township in the Canadian province of Ontario. The township, located in the Sudbury District, borders on the southwestern city limits of Greater Sudbury west of the city's Walden district. The township had a population of 373 in the 2021 Canadian census.

The township contains the communities of Nairn Centre (46°19′56″N 81°34′54″W) and Prospect Hill (46°21′19″N 81°41′17″W).

== History ==
Indigenous people have inhabited the Lake Huron north shore and Manitoulin area for millennia, and historically used the nearby Spanish (Skiminitigan in Ojibwe) and Vermilion rivers as transportation and economic corridors which connected Lake Huron's North Channel with the interior to the north (through the Spanish) and through the river system around Lake Wanapitei, ultimately to the Ottawa River (through the Vermilion).

The non-indigenous communities in the township were a result of the Canadian Pacific Railway's development of its Algoma extension from Sudbury to Sault Ste. Marie in the 1880s. The first two buildings in the town were its CPR station and section house, which housed CPR employees. During this time, the railway station was known as Nelson, and the nearby town known as Nelsonville to local people. The unofficial community around the station grew rapidly, and by the 1890s had got its first general store at the intersection of Hall and Front streets, which was built out of logs. After a few years, however, early attempts were made to create an official township under the name Nairn, which was chosen after a railway engineer's hometown of Nairn, Scotland.

In 1896, the township was officially chartered as a municipality formed from the geographic townships of Nairn, Lorne, and Hyman, and a reeve and municipal councillors were elected. In lieu of a town hall, the municipal council initially met at the town's Foresters hall until 1905, then a local hotel (which was owned by the first town clerk) until 1909, and afterward at the town jail; the Foresters hall was destroyed by a fire around 1916. Today, the town hall and community centre building is located on MacIntyre Street, on the site of the former town jail.

Within the next decade, Nairn's three churches were constructed: All Saints Anglican Church in 1897, St Jude Roman Catholic Church around 1900, and the local Methodist, later United church, in 1904. St Jude, located on MacIntyre Street, was demolished in the early 1970s and its site is presently used for the town's fire hall. The United church stands at the intersection of Smith Street and Highway 17, but has been abandoned for decades. The town's historical religious relations have been described as generally harmonious, though an Orange Hall was constructed in 1925 by Levi Pomfrey, an early English settler from Cambridgeshire who had been the town reeve in 1903. The Orange Order (or 'Orangemen') would conduct annual marches on July 12, the anniversary of the Battle of Aughrim, where in 1691 the Protestant forces of William of Orange defeated the Catholic Jacobite forces of James Stuart in their struggle for control of Britain and Ireland. Orange marches would typically end at the Roman Catholic church.

In 1907, the town fathers began to petition the Ontario provincial government to fund a road bridge across the Spanish River, as a great deal of lumbering activity was taking place on the other side. This was denied, but in 1908 a bridge was funded and constructed by the Graves Bigwood Company, which also built a set of stables and a barracks and cookhouse across the river for teamsters who were involved in hauling lumber. Graves Bigwood made the decision to relocate their office there from Wahnapitae, and the area became known as the "Headquarters". At the time, McKerrow had not yet come to exist, and the nearest settlement to the west was Espanola. This bridge became a component of the "Soo Road", which ultimately stretched from Sudbury to Sault Ste. Marie as an unreliable patchwork of local roads; this would be improved again around 1923 by the Department of Northern Development. Around 1931, the original bridge across the Spanish was washed away in a flood, and was replaced by a rudimentary ferry service that connected what is now Ferry Street with Headquarters Hill Road. Despite renewed petitions for a new bridge to replace the ferry, the service continued to operate until the late 1960s before discontinuing and effectively severing the connection between Nairn proper and the Headquarters area, which today is connected to Nairn via Highway 17 and Sand Bay Road over a causeway.

During the First World War, 35 local men and boys enlisted, which was around 12% of the town's population at the time. Only one was killed: Cpl Roy Harmon, who died in 1918 and is buried at the cemetery in Nœux-les-Mines. 18 or 19 enlisted in the Second World War, with two killed: L/Cpl Lloyd Martin (Argyll and Sutherland Highlanders of Canada), who was killed in the Netherlands in 1945 and is buried in the Groesbeek Canadian War Cemetery, and Flying Officer James Smith (Royal Canadian Air Force), who was killed in 1944 and is buried in the Harrogate (Stonefall) Commonwealth War Graves Commission Cemetery, Harrogate, Yorkshire, England.

With its strong base as a railway town, Nairn developed a significant logging industry which employed many people, and the population grew quickly. Multiple logging companies had operations in the town, with warehouses next to the town's CPR siding, where companies would distribute supplies to logging camps throughout the area; the logs themselves were moved using the Spanish and Vermilion rivers. The town's growth, however, began to slow during the 1920s, as by 1923 most of the pine in the area had been logged out. Logging operations shifted elsewhere, putting up to 1000 men out of work, and causing the town's population to steeply decline.

During the Great Depression, a relief office was opened, and many residents survived on government relief payments. Several public works projects were undertaken to create temporary employment, such as replacement of the town's original wooden sidewalks with cement, as well as road improvements. This road work improved access to the town, and was eventually followed by the construction of the current Highway 17 around 1947.

The town's fortunes changed by the late 1940s, as lumber industrialist Benjamin F. Merwin under his Pineland Timber Company moved into the area, building a modern sawmill and landing lucrative contracts for mining timbers with companies such as Inco. The mill was quickly upgraded and expanded throughout the late 1940s and early 1950s, and Merwin appointed his son, Bud, as superintendent of Nairn operations. In 1962, the Pineland company was sold to KVP and Inco.

Another raft of changes occurred in the 1960s under KVP management. Previously, the mill had been operated seasonally in the summer, but transitioned to year-round operations. The mill's waste operations, which involved simply burning mill waste at a dump site near the town, caused significant air pollution and environmental degradation to the area, and to alleviate these issues, a modern burner was installed north of the mill. In 1962, the mill's workforce was unionized under Lumber and Sawmill Worker's Union (LSWU) Local 2537, and standardized pay grades were established. All of these changes created a stronger sense of permanence for the mill, and economic stability for the town.

Things would continue to change at the mill throughout the next few decades. In 1969, KVP was purchased by Brown Forest Industry, which sold off its Espanola and area operations to the E.B. Eddy Company, and E.B. Eddy once again modernized and upgraded the mill, increasing the output from 90,000,000 board feet (210,000 m^{3}) in 1980 to 135,000,000 board feet (320,000 m^{3}) in 1984. By 1995, the mill had a workforce of 317 and produced 190,000,000 board feet (450,000 m^{3}) of lumber. Today the mill still operates and is owned by EACOM Timber Corporation.

Over these decades from the 1940s to the 1990s, the town itself changed significantly as well: road travel had begun to replace railway travel as the Canadian Pacific Railway phased out passenger transportation, and the centre of activity in the community shifted south, with the original area of settlement suffering a long-term decline. From two stopping trains in each direction in 1943 (with one western route turning south at McKerrow to serve Espanola and Manitoulin and the other continuing further west to Sault Ste. Marie), passenger service was reduced to a single train per direction per day by 1970, and Greyhound bus service grew in popularity during the 1950s. Early town plans in 1897 had called for a Hammond Road to run along the path of the CPR tote road and cross the Spanish at a similar location to the CPR's rail bridge. This was finally realized with the construction of the new Ontario Highway 17 around 1947, the culmination of about a decade of road construction and public works projects in the area. The new highway was routed south of the town's main commercial area, and facilitated a slow drift of the centre of the town away from the original core formed around the CPR station and Hall's general store. Some businesses relocated to new highway-adjacent locations, while others closed one by one, and there was a gradual shift away from hotels, taverns, and small retail, toward garages and gas stations, as truck freight became more frequent along the new highway, and larger centres like Espanola and Sudbury became more accessible for residents. The possibilities of car commuting depressed demand for temporary accommodation and therefore decreased the customer base for the town's hotels and boarding houses, as workers could now commute from larger urban centres, and seasonal industries, which heavily utilized temporary accommodations, declined. However, a new residential subdivision was built south of the highway in the 1960s as the town experienced a population boom due to an increase in the workforce at the lumber mill. Passenger rail service ended altogether in 1976, and the Nairn railway station was demolished sometime after.

On January 1, 1998, the Township of Nairn was merged with the unincorporated geographic Township of Hyman to form the new Township of Nairn and Hyman.

The focus of development in the town in recent decades has increasingly been on improving infrastructure and local services in the hopes of attracting new residents, and functioning largely as a residential community with significant industrial activity throughout the township relative to its population, with some remaining commercial activity remaining in the form of the truck stop.

On November 22, 2021, Laurier Falldien resigned as the town's mayor, citing opposition to COVID-19 vaccine mandates.

== Demographics ==
In the 2021 Census of Population conducted by Statistics Canada, Nairn and Hyman had a population of 373 living in 162 of its 215 total private dwellings, a change of 9.1% from its 2016 population of 342. With a land area of 159.18 km^{2} (61.46 sq mi), it had a population density of 2.3/km^{2} (6.1/sq mi) in 2021.

Canada census – Nairn and Hyman community profile

	2021	2016	2011
Population	373 (+9.1% from 2016)	342 (-28.3% from 2011)	477 (-3.2% from 2006)
Land area	159.18 km^{2} (61.46 sq mi)	160.82 km^{2} (62.09 sq mi)	160.94 km^{2} (62.14 sq mi)
Population density	2.3/km^{2} (6.0/sq mi)	2.1/km^{2} (5.4/sq mi)	3.0/km^{2} (7.8/sq mi)
Median age	48.8 (M: 47.6, F: 51.6)	51.2 (M: 51.1, F: 51.5)
Private dwellings	215 (total) 162 (occupied)	190 (total)	240 (total)
Median household income	$81,000	$81,664

References: 2021 2016 2011

Historical census populations – Nairn and Hyman Township
Year	Pop.	±%
1996	456	—
2001	420	−7.9%
2006	493	+17.4%
2011	477	−3.2%
2016	342	−28.3%
2021	373	+9.1%
Source: Statistics Canada

Historical census populations – Nairn Township (pre-amalgamation)

Year	Pop.	±%
1921	203	—
1931	180	−11.3%
1941	191	+6.1%
1951	240	+25.7%
1956	248	+3.3%

Year	Pop.	±%
1961	298	+20.2%
1966	366	+22.8%
1971	489	+33.6%
1976	491	+0.4%
1981	514	+4.7%

Year	Pop.	±%
1986	459	−10.7%
1991	433	−5.7%
1996	419	−3.2%

Source: Statistics Canada, Ontario Ministry of Finance

== Economy ==
Since shortly after its settlement, Nairn's primary economic activity has been logging and lumber milling, and the lumber mill there is today owned and operated by EACOM Timber Corporation. There was some minor agricultural activity in the township in the late 19th and early 20th centuries, but this has since declined. The Nairn Falls Dam and Generating Plant, built in 1915, was once a source of employment for some people in the town, but has since become almost entirely automated.

The town is home to two local businesses involved in construction and transportation, OCL Trucking and Excavating and T. Bell Transport, which both operate gravel pits in the area.

Nairn's historic commercial area, centred around the railway station and the intersection of Front and Hall Streets, once featured three hotels, three general stores, two barbershops, two pool halls, a boarding house, a butcher shop, a men's furnishing store, and a post office. It began to decline after the first half of the 20th century, and the former commercial buildings have mostly been converted into private homes. The last surviving business establishment in this area is the post office.

As the old commercial area declined, a new southern commercial area began to develop starting in the late 1940s, after the new Highway 17 route was constructed around 1947. This began with the relocation of an existing business, Al's Inn, from the junction of MacIntyre and Minto Streets to a new location where Front Street intersected with the new Highway 17. This business changed names and owners a number of times, as Bob's BA Service Station from 1952 to 1979, the Rainbow Diner from 1979, then the Rainbow Truck Stop, and now Jeremy's Truck Stop. As well, the site of the former town park, also adjacent to the new Highway 17, was redeveloped into a Texaco gas station. The site was later redeveloped again as the Busy Bee, a large roadhouse-style restaurant which opened in 1994. After a fire and financial problems, this restaurant closed and is currently abandoned. A new general store, Laurier's Convenience Store, was constructed on Smith Street south of the highway, but was only open briefly and is now closed.

Today, the primary commercial area in the township is centred around Highway 17 and lies to the southwest of the residential area.

== Infrastructure ==
=== Transportation ===
==== Road ====
Highway 17 bypasses most of residential Nairn to the south, though there are a number of highway-based businesses that serve travellers. The old Highway 17 route has largely been converted into municipal roads and runs directly through the town. Upon crossing the municipal boundary into Greater Sudbury, it becomes Municipal Road 55.

==== Rail ====
The Huron Central Railway (HCRY) operates an active freight line that passes through the old downtown area of Nairn, which is now largely residential. This line is also known as the CPR Webbwood Subdivision, as the HCRY operates along the line on a lease from the CPR. Remnants of the now-abandoned Algoma Eastern Railway are visible in the area, as it passed by Vale's Nairn Falls Dam and Generating Plant, then through the north of Nairn (with a station that was adjacent to Ferry Street), before dipping to the south to cross over the CPR line west of the town. In the mid-2010s, the Coalition for Algoma Passenger Trains campaigned for reintroduction of passenger service on the Huron Central line through the town.

==== Bus ====
Greyhound Canada once operated intercity bus service to Nairn starting in at least the 1960s, but this service was permanently cancelled in 2018.

In 2018, Ontario Northland announced a major expansion of its motor coach services west of Sudbury, which included a flag stop at Nairn Centre. Passengers may board buses headed toward Sault Ste. Marie, or Sudbury.

==== Walking and cycling ====
A segment of the Great Lakes Waterfront Trail, which is also a part of the Trans Canada Trail, runs through the township. In the west end it follows a paved shoulder along Highway 17, then has an on-road section following Old Nairn Road, Minto Street, and McIntyre Street, then continues along Municipal Road 55 once entering Greater Sudbury.

=== Utilities ===
The community has a piped water system, which was installed in 1995.

=== Healthcare ===
There is a medical clinic and pharmacy in Nairn Centre. The nearest hospital is in Espanola.

== Education ==
=== Reading Camp ===
Nairn is historically notable as the place where Alfred Fitzpatrick, then the local Presbyterian minister, created a Reading Camp in 1899 in order to teach literacy to local lumber workers. This would grow into the Labourer-Teacher movement, where ordinary workers living and working in remote lumber camps and communities would teach literacy to their fellow workers in a peer fashion. This revolutionary educational movement ran counter to many contemporary ideas around education, but was wildly successful and later grew into Frontier College, a decentralized literacy organization which is now based in Toronto. Fitzpatrick's Reading Camp is today commemorated with a sign placed at the entrance to Nairn Centre along Highway 17.

=== Public school ===
A small log schoolhouse was constructed on Front Street by the early settlers in 1895. This schoolhouse was the site of the first town meeting in 1896. In the early years it was known as Rural School No. 1 Nairn and Lorne. By 1925, the school had sixty students, and the decision was made to hire a second teacher and split the school into two classes, which were initially separated only by a curtain. By 1926, the existing school had been renovated and expanded into a new two-room school, which incorporated parts of the original structure. This new school featured two entirely separate classrooms, as well as a large basement containing the teachers' room and boys' and girls' play rooms for the students, along with the furnace and coal room. By this time it was known as the Nairn Public School.

By 1965, the school had once again become too small for the student population, so the facilities were again renovated with the addition of a third classroom in the basement, taking the place of the old boys' play area. This would soon change, however, as a new school was constructed and would open in 1966. With its attached gymnasium, the new school was also able to function as a community space.

Soon, however, the school was affected by a wave of school closures and school board amalgamations that began to take place across Northeastern Ontario in the 1960s. In 1966, the school at Beaver Lake closed, and students there were bused to Nairn Public School, rather than to the R.H. Murray Public School in Whitefish. This caused overcrowding issues, and the gymnasium had to double as a classroom. The student population grew again in 1969 as the school's catchment area grew to include the village of High Falls, so an expansion to the new building took place. This expansion was completed in 1970, and included two new classrooms, lunch and storage rooms, a principal's office, and a library. However, the lunch room was quickly converted into a kindergarten space, and the storage room became a special education room.

In 1983–84, the school population reached its historic height of over 180 students, but enrollment was beginning to decline. Still, the school was expanded for the final time, to include a new library and principal's office, purpose-built special education room, and a staff room. By its 100th anniversary in 1995, the school population had decreased dramatically, with some areas of the building left in disuse, and by 1999 the school had closed. The school building is currently abandoned, and students are bused to Espanola.

== See also ==
- List of townships in Ontario
- List of francophone communities in Ontario
