= Vermilion River (Sudbury District) =

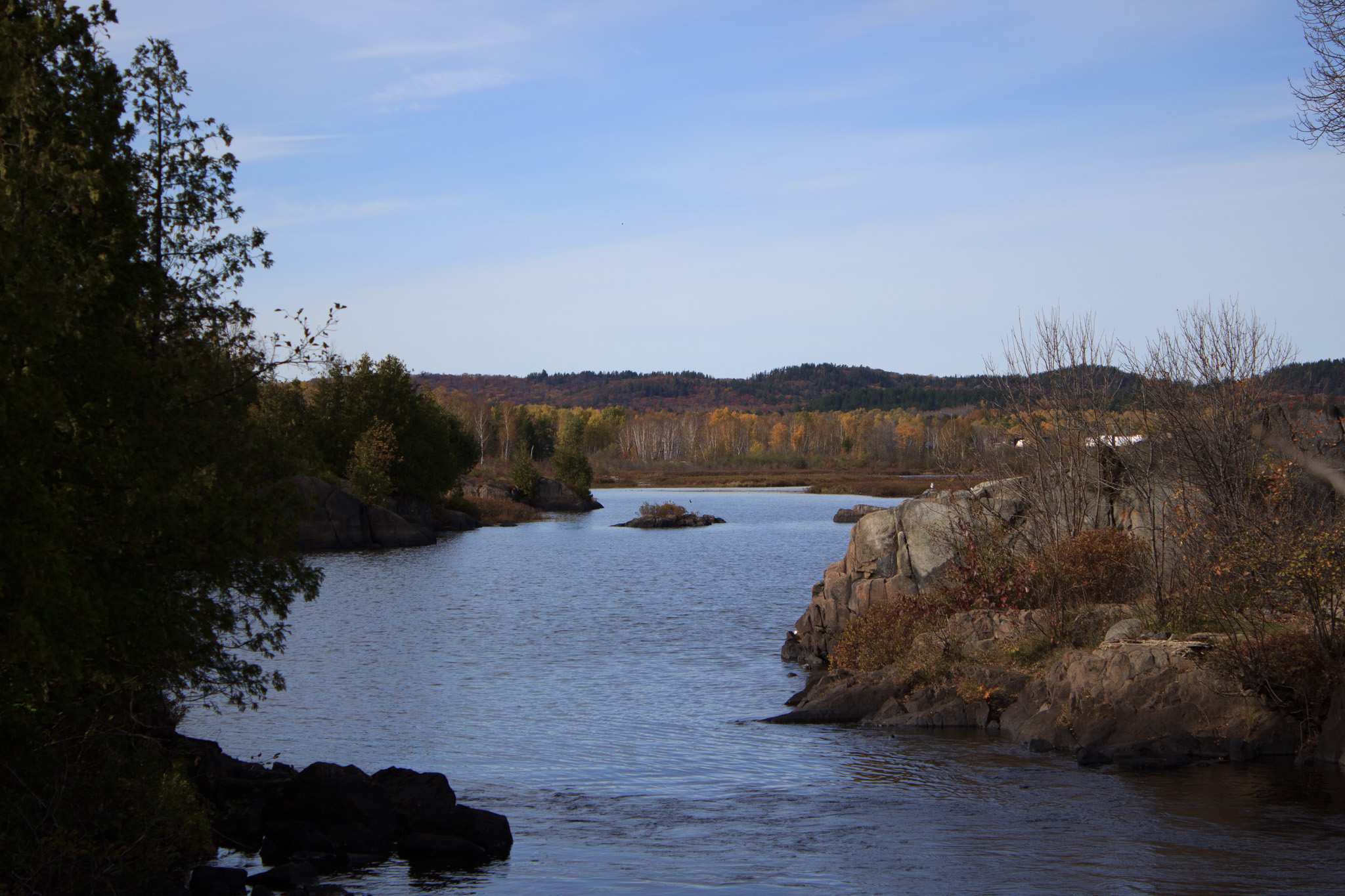
- Vermilion River near Capreol

- Location of the mouth of the Vermilion River in Ontario

Location
- Country: Canada
- Province: Ontario
- Region: Northeastern Ontario

Physical characteristics
- Source: Unnamed lake
  - coordinates: 47°07′35″N 81°18′55″W
  - elevation: 425 m (1,394 ft)
- Mouth: Spanish River
  - coordinates: 46°15′37″N 81°41′11″W
  - elevation: 195 m (640 ft)
- Length: 200 km (120 mi)

Basin features
- River system: Great Lakes Basin
- Tributaries
  - left: Whitson River
  - right: Onaping River, Nelson River, Rapid River, Roberts River

The Vermilion River (Ojibwa/Odawa: Atikamgzib or Dikmegzubi meaning "whitefish river") is a river in the Lake Huron drainage basin in Sudbury District and Greater Sudbury in Northeastern Ontario, Canada.

== Course ==
The river begins at an unnamed lake in Unorganized Sudbury, Sudbury District, about 4.7 kilometres (2.9 mi) northwest of the settlement of McKees Camp and the McKee's Camp railway station, and heads north to Tramp Lake where it meets the Canadian National Railway (CN) transcontinental main line, served by the Via Rail The Canadian passenger train. The river then turns southeast through Thor Lake and begins a long stretch paralleled by the CN line. It heads through Post Lake and past the settlement of Laforest to reach Baseline Lake and the settlement of Raphoe. The Vermilion River enters Greater Sudbury near the settlement of Sellwood, takes in the right tributary Roberts River at the settlement of Milnet where it also meets Sudbury Municipal Road 84 (formerly Ontario Highway 545), turns south, and reaches the community of Capreol, where the river and railway line part. The river heads west, takes in the right tributary Rapid River, passes over the Kettle Rapids, takes in the right tributary Nelson River, turns southwest, passes the community of Rayside-Balfour and takes in the right tributary Onaping River near the community of Onaping Falls. It is crossed by the Canadian Pacific Railway (CP) transcontinental main line, served by the Via Rail Sudbury – White River train passenger train and enters Vermilion Lake at the middle of the north side. The river exits the lake at the east over the Domtar Stobie Dam, takes in the left tributary Whitson River, loops southeast then heads south, passes over McFadden Falls, Cascade Falls and Duncan Chute, is crossed by Ontario Highway 17 and reaches McCharles Lake east of the community of Whitefish, and from which point the river forms the boundary between Greater Sudbury and the Whitefish Lake 6 Indian reserve. At Rat Lake, the river then heads west then southwest, over the Wabagishik Dam, enters Nairn and Hyman township in Sudbury District at Wabagishik Lake, and reaches its mouth at the Spanish River, in the geographic township of Foster in Unorganized Sudbury just east of the town limit of Espanola, which flows to the North Channel on Lake Huron.

== Ecology ==
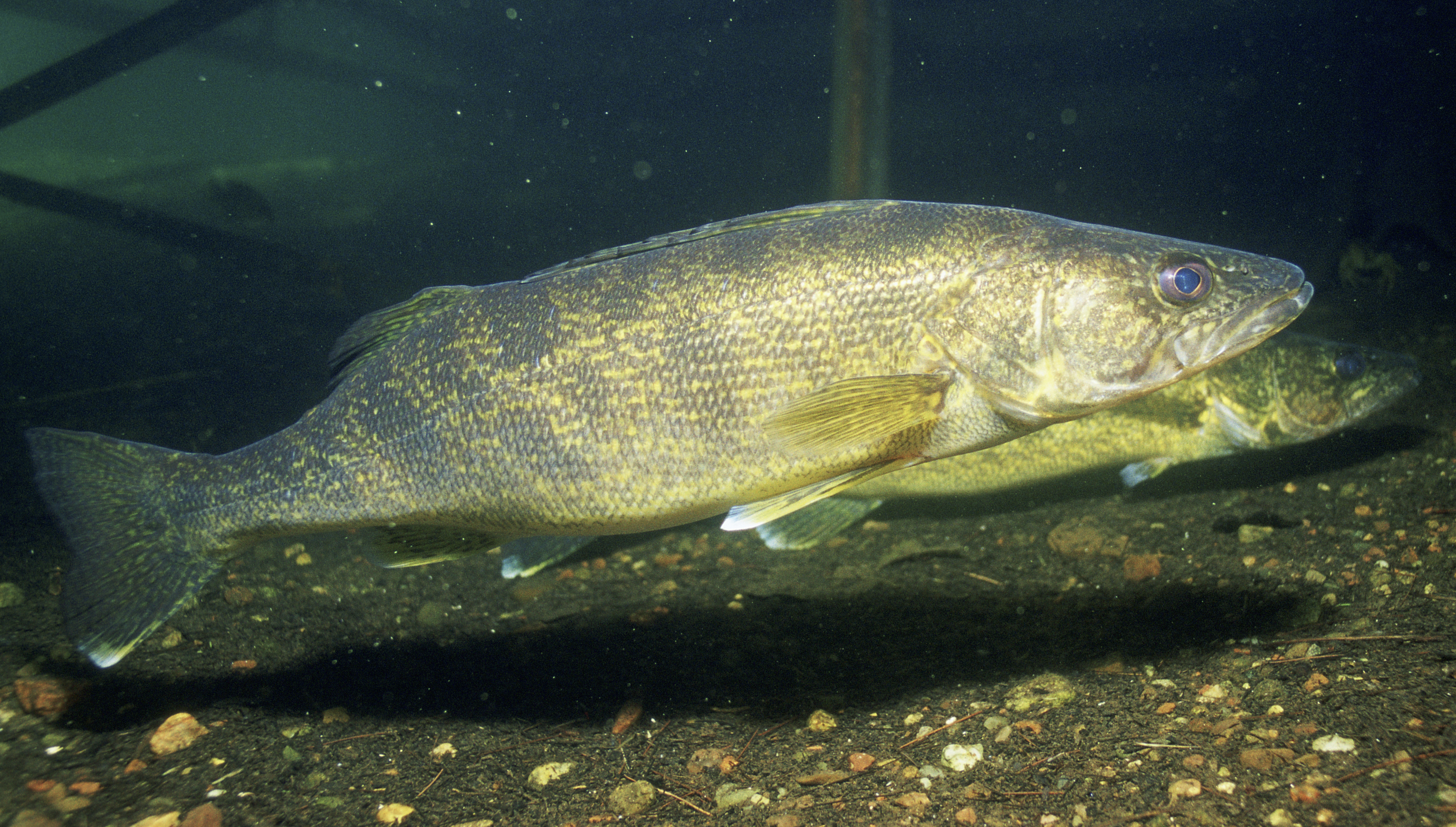
Walleye, Sander vitreus

See also: Committee on the Status of Endangered Wildlide in Canada, Lake sturgeon

Surrounding the Vermilion River are aquatic, terrestrial, and wetland ecosystems, where 10 species were identified as threatened from the Committee on the Status of Endangered Wildlife in Canada (COSEWIC) and Species at Risk Act (SARA) index in a report from 2013. Along the lower Vermilion River, it serves as biodiverse ecosystem for deer, birds, herpetofauna, conifers, and other vegetation communities. For instance, 7 bird species were identified as threatened out of 96 species observed in 2010. A total of 106 plant species were observed in 8 forest and wetland communities containing distinct dominant species and habitat characteristics.

Between 2010-2011, a total of 22 fish species were identified in the lower Vermilion River, including white sucker, lake sturgeon, johnny darter, smallmouth bass, rock bass, shorthead redhorse, logperch, longnose dace, burbot, golden redhorse, northern redbelly dace, yellow perch, pumpkinseed, central mudminnow, bluntnose minnow, fathead minnow, emerald shiner, brook stickleback, lake herring and spawning habitat for walleye and northern pike. Between 2006-2017, the Committee on the Status of Endangered Wildlife in Canada (COSEWIC) listed lake sturgeon as a threatened species in the Great Lakes - Upper St. Lawrence populations. Poor water quality, habitat fragmentation, and regulated water flows are responsible for the decline of lake sturgeon in North America, often caused by dams and other flow control structures.

== River modifications ==
The Wabagishik Dam and Generating Station is situated on the river at Lorne Falls. Water retained at the dam's headpond results in a widened section of the river known as Ella Lake. The dam and power station opened in 1909, originally to power mining projects in the area. The dam is owned by Vale Canada (Vale) a subsidiary of Vale S.A. headquartered in Toronto, Ontario, Canada. The corporation has been criticized for environmental and indigenous concerns in the past, however, has been cooperating with locals and organizations to increase community relations in recent years.

The Stobie dam as well as other structures on the tributary Onaping River are used to regulate water flow for hydroelectricity production at Lorne station as well as at other generating stations on the Spanish River.

== Hydroelectricity ==
See also: Environmental impact assessment

In 2011, four run-of-the-river hydroelectric generating stations (GS) were proposed along the Vermilion River as well as several flood control structures to increase water security in Sudbury, Ontario. Under the Harper government, due to revisions in the former Canadian Environmental Assessment Act, the new Canadian Environmental Assessment Act, 2012 pardoned several projects from undertaking environmental assessments, which generated backlash from the community and local not-for-profit grassroot organizations. In 2016, a response from the Independent Electricity System Operator (IESO), declared 4 Feed-In-Tariff (FIT) contracts terminated in the Vermilion River, including the Wabagishik Rapids, Cascade Rapids, McPherson Rapids, and At Soo Crossings in addition to several other sites proposed by Xeneca Power Development Inc. (Xeneca).

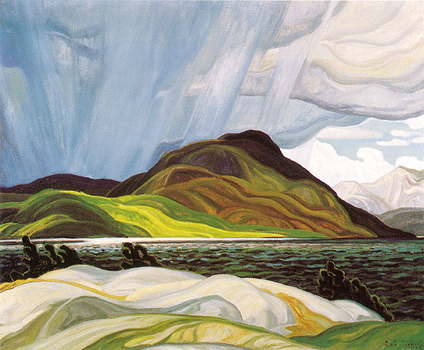
Oil painting of Wabagishik Lake by Franklin Carmichael

Most notably, the Wabagishik Rapids Hydroelectric Generating Station conducted by Xeneca between 2011-2015, proposed the construction of a modified run-of-the-river dam supplying about 1,600 homes with green renewable energy. Wabagishik Rapids GS is the one of five hydroelectric dams enlisted by Xeneca to provide green energy for the Sudbury Nickel District. The project was confronted with community backlash, including the Vermilion River Stewards, Ontario Rivers Alliance, the Whitefish River First Nations and several other indigenous groups aimed to conserve the local riverine ecosystem. More than twenty individuals and organizations advocated against the proposed dam, and in May 2016, the community was made aware that the project was terminated as of September 2015.

In 2016, twenty-seven flow control structures and generating facilities owned by 12 different corporations have been recorded within the Vermilion watershed. Persistent advocacy by the Vermilion River Stewards, Ontario Rivers Alliance, indigenous groups and community members have reduced the quantity of water control structures throughout the Spanish and Vermilion watersheds. Concerns attributed to existing social and environmental issues involving Vale Canada (Vale) on the Wabagishik dam combined with a lack of transparency and regards for environmental assessments taken by Xeneca have led to a mutual dispute over new developments on the Vermilion River.

== Tributaries ==
- Wabagishik Lake
  - Blake Creek (right)
- Muskawin Creek (left)
- McCharles Lake
  - Fairbank Creek (right)
- Levey Creek (left)
- Gordon Creek (right)
- Whitson River (left)
- McKenzie Creek (left)
- Vermilion Lake
  - Cameron Creek (right)
- Sandcherry Creek (right)
- Nelson River (right)
- Rapid River (right)
- Grassy Creek (left)
- Wisner Creek (right)
- Hutton Creek (right)
- Roberts River (right)
- Bessie Creek (left)
- Lonely Creek (left)
- Burnish Creek (right)
- Helen Creek (left)
- Coonie Creek (left)
- Pilon Creek (left)

== See also ==
- List of rivers of Ontario

== Sources ==
- "Vermilion River". Geographical Names Data Base. Natural Resources Canada.
- "Vermilion River". Atlas of Canada. Natural Resources Canada. 2010-02-04. Shows the river course.
- "Spanish River Valley Signature Site" (PDF). Ontario Parks. Autumn 2002. Archived from the original (PDF) on 2006-03-13.
