= Albert Salter =

Albert Pellew Salter (1816–1874) was a provincial land surveyor in Upper Canada then Ontario in the mid-19th century. He is historically most notable for having discovered magnetic abnormalities at what is now Creighton Mine in Greater Sudbury, while surveying a baseline westward from Lake Nipissing in 1856.

Born at Teignmouth, Devon, England in 1816, Salter emigrated to Canada in 1834 and initially settled at Plympton; he was later a combatant in the Upper Canada Rebellion of 1837. He subsequently married in 1839 and taught school while obtaining his degree in land surveying and civil engineering.

In 1847, he was hired by the Commissioner of Crown Lands to survey mining locations in the Sault Ste. Marie region. In 1855, he was assigned to survey the North Shore of Lake Huron, in light of the recent Robinson-Huron Treaty. The following year, he returned to the region to survey the first baseline, and detected the magnetic anomalies as he passed between Round Lake and Whitefish Lake on what is now the Whitefish Lake First Nations reserve.

The area was then examined by Alexander Murray of the Geological Survey of Canada, who confirmed "the presence of an immense mass of magnetic trap". Due to the then-remoteness of the Sudbury area, however, Salter's discovery did not have much immediate impact. The later construction of the Canadian Pacific Railway through the area, however, made mineral exploration more feasible and finally resulted in the development of a mining settlement in 1883.

Salter died in 1874.

Salter's Meridian is commemorated by a historical plaque in the Naughton neighbourhood of Sudbury.
