= Webbwood, Ontario =

Coordinates: 46.269929°N 81.883761°W

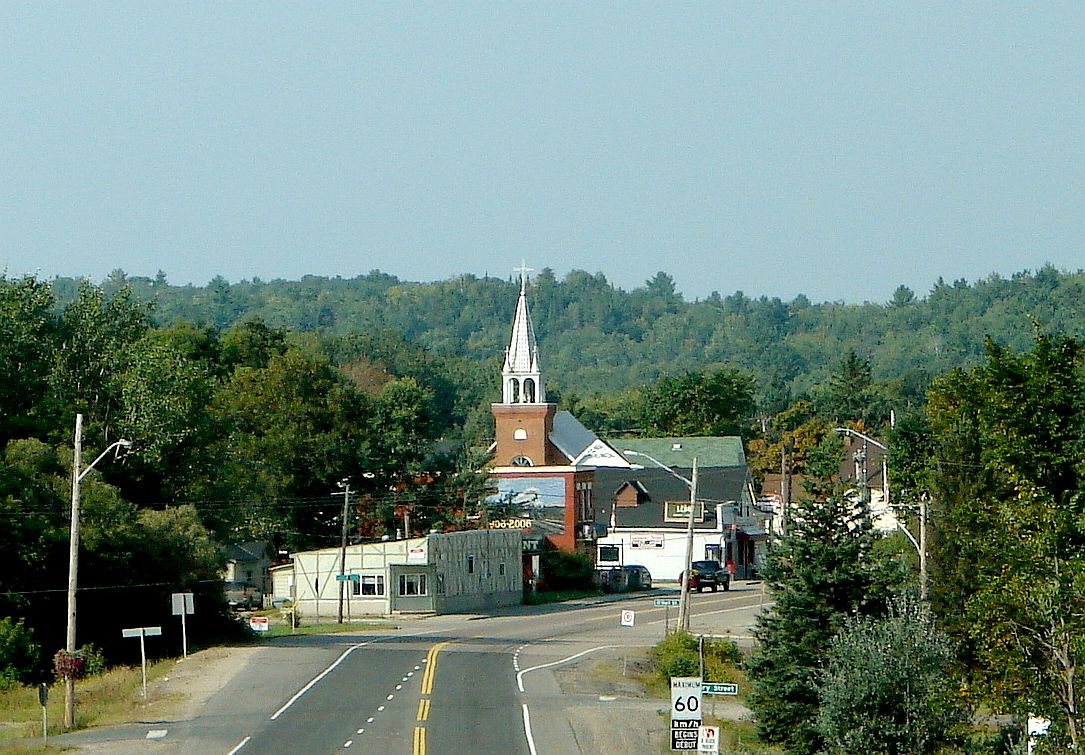

Webbwood is an unincorporated community in Ontario, Canada. It is recognized as a designated place by Statistics Canada.

== Demographics ==
In the 2021 Census of Population conducted by Statistics Canada, Webbwood had a population of 440 living in 207 of its 221 total private dwellings, a change of −9.3% from its 2016 population of 485. With a land area of 2.82 km^{2} (1.09 sq mi), it had a population density of 156.0/km^{2} (404.1/sq mi) in 2021.

== History ==
Webbwood was the first town in Canada to elect a female mayor. In 1936 Barbara Hanley became the first female mayor in Canada. She served as Webbwoods mayor until 1944.

== See also ==
- List of communities in Ontario
- List of designated places in Ontario
