= Mond Nickel Company =

Defunct mining company

The Mond Nickel Company Limited was a United Kingdom-based mining company, formed on September 20, 1900, licensed in Canada to carry on business in the province of Ontario, from October 16, 1900. The firm was founded by Ludwig Mond (1839–1909) to process Canadian ore from mines near Sudbury, which were then shipped to Mond's works in Britain for final purification via his patented carbonyl process.

The first of Mond's Canadian mining properties located in Denison Township, was purchased from Rinaldo McConnell and associates in 1899. This site was renamed the Victoria Mine and development began in 1900. About the same time, Mond's refinery at Clydach, near Swansea, Wales, was being erected.

Around the same time, Mond purchased a second mining location from Rinaldo McConnell called the Garson Mine which was developed later on in Garson Township.

In 1911 the Mond company began construction of a new smelter at Coniston, Ontario. In that year, the company purchased the mining rights at Frood Extension about 8 miles from Coniston, though no serious development took place at this location until the 1920s.

In 1925 Alfred Mond established for the Canadian product a platinum refinery in Acton, London. It was at the time the biggest such operation in the world.

By 1928 Inco began development of its Frood Mine. When it was determined that it and Mond's Frood Extension were part of the same ore body, Alfred Mond negotiated an agreement pursuant to which in 1929 the interests of the Mond Nickel Company were merged into the International Nickel Company through the issue of the latter's stock in exchange for the outstanding stock of Mond.

Also included in the transaction were the works of the Henry Wiggin Company in Birmingham, where rolling mills fabricating plants and chemical plants were located.

As one result of the merger, the Inconel trademark was created in 1932 for the output of Henry Wiggan & Co, the Mond Nickel Company's research arm in Hereford, England.

In 1936, a research facility was opened in Birmingham.

In 1961, the name of the company was changed to International Nickel Company (Mond) Ltd.

In 2006, INCO was purchased outright by the Brazilian metals company CVRD (Companhia Vale do Rio Doce), now renamed Vale S.A.

== Clydach works ==
To process the output of the Canadian-based mines, in 1902 Mond established a nickel refinery and works at Clydach, near Swansea, Wales. "The Mond" as it is known locally is the last nonferrous works in the Swansea valley, occupying land between the canal and the River Tawe. Ownership passed to INCO in 1928, and the company's successor Vale S.A. still operates the plant today.

Ludwig Mond had discovered that adding 3.5% nickel to steel greatly increased its strength. Although he died in 1909, his son Alfred Mond sat as both chairman of the Mond company and as Liberal Member of Parliament for Swansea from 1910 to 1918, and for Swansea West from 1918 to 1923. With a virtual monopoly on nickel production within the British Empire, the Mond Company's business expanded greatly during World War 1, with 450 of the 900 employees supported to join the British Armed Forces, with most being replaced by the same number of female employees from 1916 onwards. Alfred served in the coalition government of David Lloyd George as First Commissioner of Works from 1916 to 1921, allowing him to use the expertise of the Mond company to develop armour for the first British Tanks during World War I.

== Supplier to Manhattan Project ==
During World War II, as well as producing armour plate, the works was also commissioned to undertake a number of other highly classified secret projects. This included producing from 1943 onwards fine sintered nickel mesh for the British/Canadian Tube Alloys project, the joint research and development programme authorised to develop nuclear weapons. The gaseous diffusion method of extracting the radioactive isotope U235 from the uranium ore involved turning it into a gaseous form of uranium in a heated chamber, and forcing it against a very fine meshed membrane of nickel powder. After the signining of the Quebec Agreement with the United States, Tube Alloys was subsumed into the larger Manhattan Project. The Mond Company was the sole supplier of nickel mesh to the K-25 facility in Oak Ridge, Tennessee, which produced the U235 used in Little Boy, the world's first atomic bomb dropped on Hiroshima on 6 August 1945.
