= Walden, Ontario =

Coordinates: 46.358°N 81.334°W

Walden
- Dissolved municipality (lower-tier)
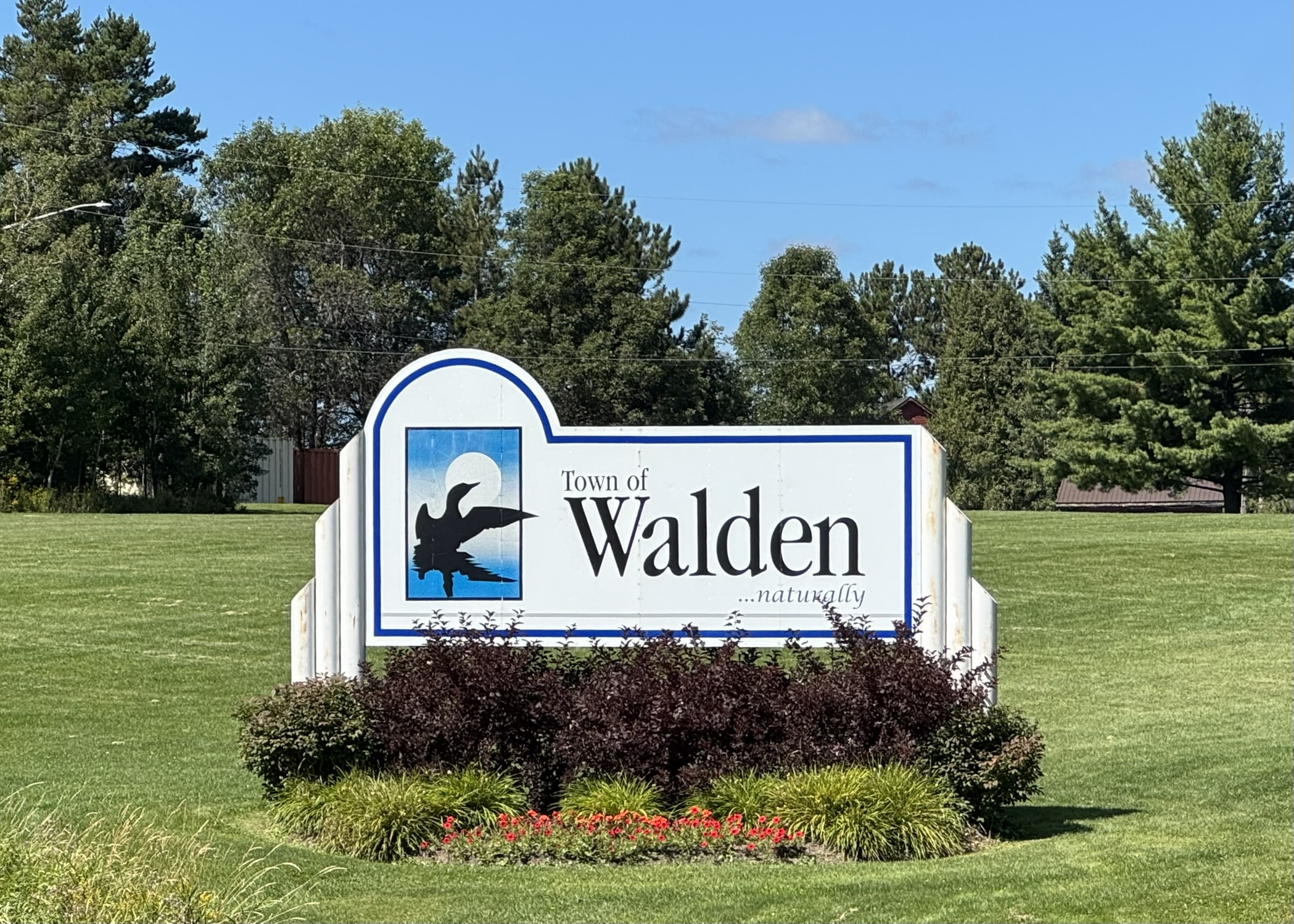

- Location of Walden (red) compared to the rest of the Sudbury Region until 2000.
- Country: Canada
- Province: Ontario
- City: Greater Sudbury
- Ward: 2
- Incorporated: January 1, 1973
- Dissolved: December 31, 2000

Government
  - Governing Body: Greater Sudbury City Council
  - MP: Viviane Lapointe (Liberal); Jim Belanger (Conservative)
  - MPP: France Gélinas (NDP)

Population (2011)Statistics Canada
  - Total: 10,664
- Population computed by combining Census Tracts 5800130.00, 5800131.00 and 5800132.00 and removing the Whitefish Indian Reserve
- Time zone: UTC−05:00 (EST)
  - Summer (DST): UTC−04:00 (EDT)
- Postal Code FSA: P0M, P3Y
- Area codes: 705, 249
- Website: Walden Community Action Network

Walden (Canada 1996 Census population 10,292) was a town in the Canadian province of Ontario, which existed from 1973 to 2000. Created as part of the Regional Municipality of Sudbury when regional government was introduced, the town was dissolved when the city of Greater Sudbury was incorporated on January 1, 2001. The name Walden continues to be informally used to designate the area.

Walden now constitutes most of Ward 2 on Greater Sudbury City Council. The eastern portion of Walden is part of the federal Sudbury electoral district, represented in the House of Commons of Canada by Viviane Lapointe of the Liberal Party of Canada, while the western portion is in the district of Sudbury East—Manitoulin—Nickel Belt, represented by Jim Belanger of the Conservative Party of Canada. The entirety of Walden is in the provincial constituency of Nickel Belt, represented in the Legislative Assembly of Ontario by France Gélinas of the Ontario New Democratic Party.

In the Canada 2011 Census, the areas of Lively, Waters, Mikkola and Naughton were grouped for the first time as the population centre (or urban area) of Lively, with a population of 6,922 and a population density of 350.9/km^{2}. No separate population statistics were published for the more rural western portion of Walden, which was counted only as part of the city's overall census data; however, the individual census tracts corresponding to the former town of Walden had a total population of 10,664. For the Canada 2016 Census, the boundaries of the Lively population centre were revised to exclude Naughton, for a new population of 5,608 and an adjusted 2011 population of 5,584.

== History ==
The town was created by amalgamating the township municipalities of Waters and Drury, Dennison & Graham with the unincorporated geographic townships of Lorne, Louise and Dieppe and parts of the unincorporated townships of Hyman, Trill, Fairbank, Creighton, Snider and Eden. The name "Walden" was chosen as an acronym of Waters, Lively and Denison. Other names were suggested, but the final selection process had narrowed the naming options to Walden or Makada, an Ojibwe name for the town's Black Lake (makade in contemporary spelling).

Tom Davies, who later became chair of the Regional Municipality of Sudbury, was the first mayor of Walden as a town. Later mayors included Charles White, Terry Kett, Alex Fex and Dick Johnstone. Following Davies' retirement as chair of the regional municipality in 1997, Sudbury's city hall was renamed Tom Davies Square in his honour.

Prior to the municipal amalgamation, Walden was the largest town by land area in Canada.

== Communities ==
=== Lively ===
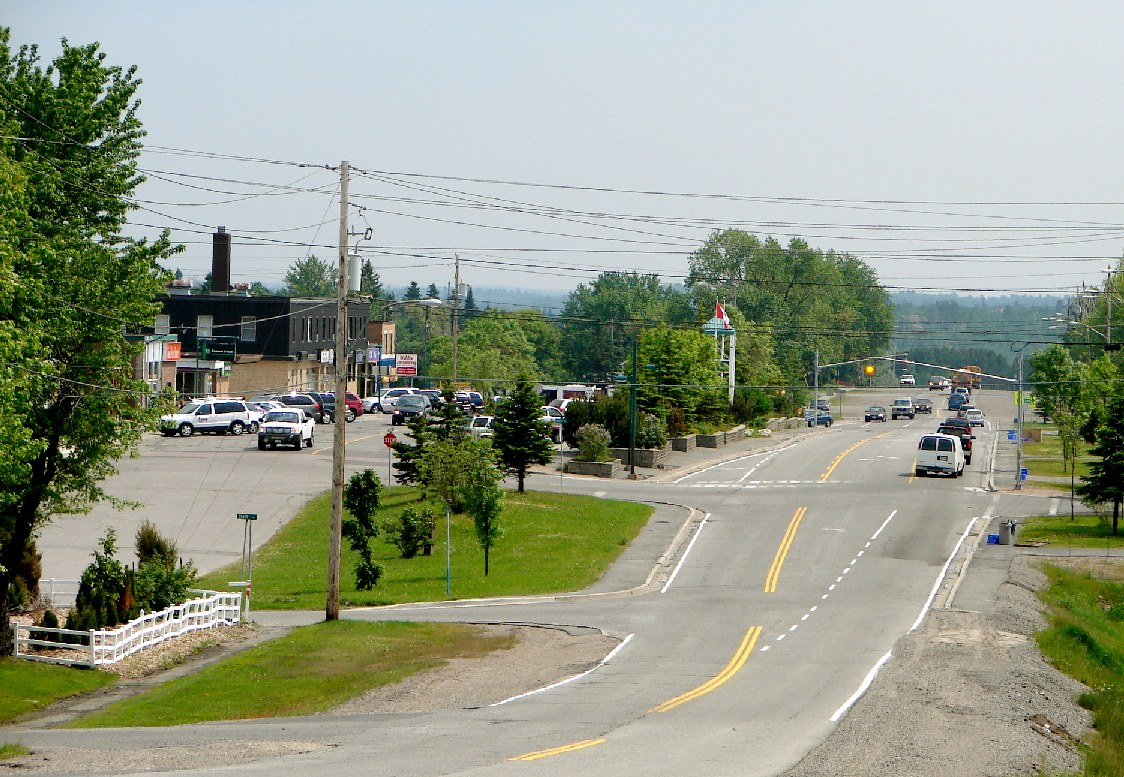
Lively

The administrative and commercial centre of Walden, Lively was established in the 1950s as a company townsite for employees of INCO's Creighton Mine facilities. It was named for an early settler, Charles Lively. Prior to the community's establishment, a few family farms were located in the area. The most notable of these, the Anderson Farm, is now the Anderson Farm Museum, which showcases aspects of the history of Lively, Creighton, and Waters Township. Lively's postal delivery and telephone exchange also include the Mikkola subdivision, located at the eastern terminus of Highway 17's freeway segment, and the Waters area.

From the intersection of Municipal Roads 24 and 55, Lively refers to the area extending north along MR 24, Mikkola refers to the area extending eastward along MR 55 toward the Highway 17 interchange, and Waters refers to the area extending westward along MR 55 toward Naughton.

Lively was the first area hit by the Sudbury tornado on August 20, 1970.

Lively is also home to the Walden area's branch of the Greater Sudbury Public Library.

=== Little Creighton ===
A small residential subdivision just north of Lively, long known as "Dogpatch", officially rebranded itself as Little Creighton in 2015.

=== Naughton ===
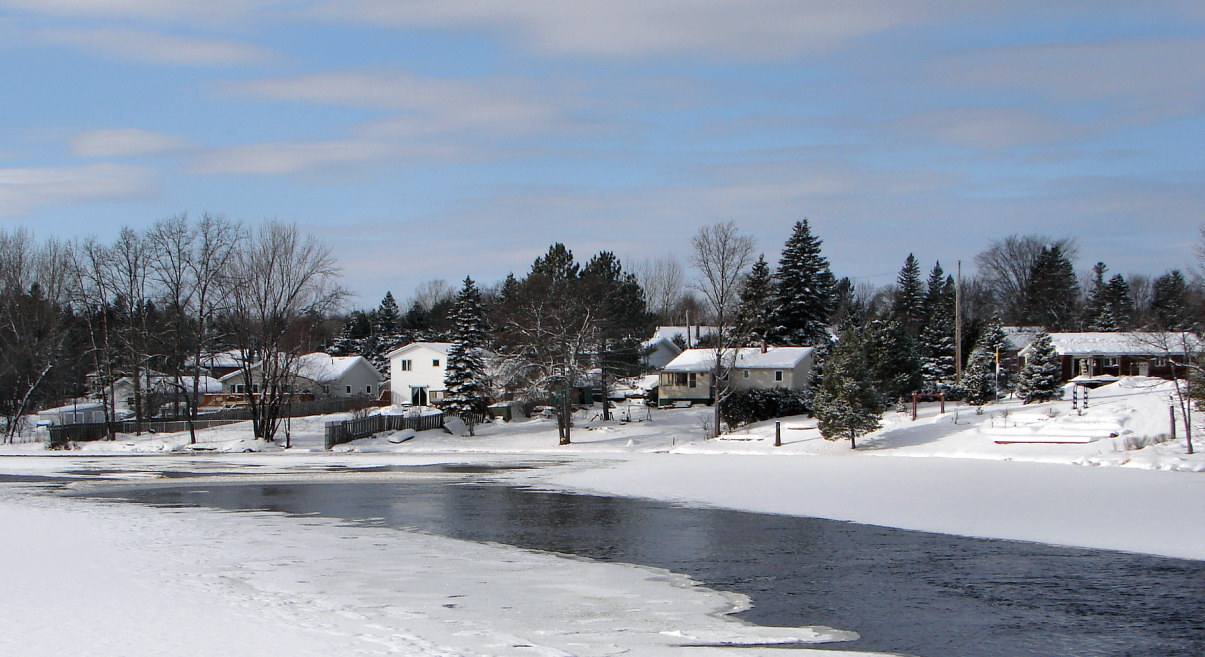
Naughton on Simon Lake

Naughton was originally established as a point along the Canadian Pacific Railway Algoma Branch and was named McNaughtonville. In 1887, the Hudson's Bay Company relocated its existing trading post from Whitefish Lake to the south, which had been established in 1824, to Naughton, so that it could be closer to the CPR line. The trading post closed in 1896, and during the 1920s and 1930s, many of the original buildings at the trading post site were demolished or burned down, though the store itself survived until at least the 1960s.

Naughton is the birthplace of Boston Bruins legend Art Ross, who was the son of Thomas B. Ross, the trading post's postmaster in 1881. In 1947, Ross donated the NHL trophy bearing his name awarded to the player scoring the most points during the season. Ross was also inducted into the Hockey Hall of Fame in 1945.

Naughton is also home to a number of historical plaques commemorating Salter's Meridian, a survey line which resulted in the first known evidence of the Sudbury area's massive mineral deposits, as well the Hudson's Bay Company's Whitefish Lake Trading Post. Naughton is also home to the Walden Cross Country Ski Club, of which sports the ParaNordic program (an organization that allows children with disabilities to cross-country ski in a familiar environment and race with others of their skill levels.) It was also home to the now-defunct Sparks AC, an affiliate of the Finnish-Canadian Amateur Sports Federation.

=== Whitefish ===
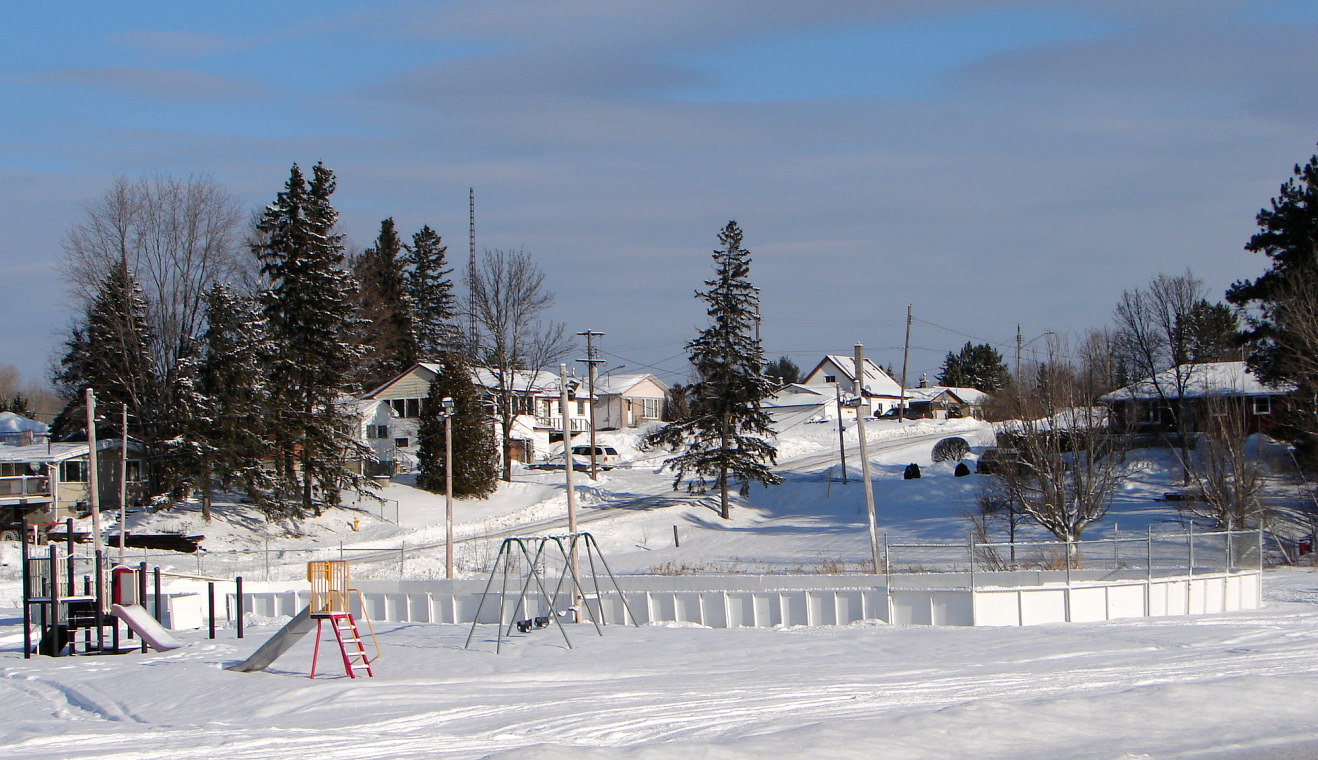
Whitefish

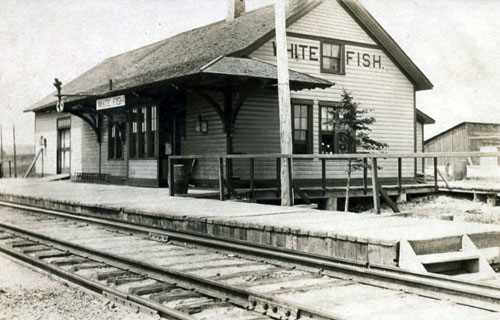
Canadian Pacific Railway station in Whitefish, c. 1911

Whitefish is located approximately 14 km (8.7 mi) west of Lively, near the western terminus of the Highway 17 freeway route. Whitefish's postal delivery and telephone exchange also include the community of Den-Lou, which is named for its location straddling the boundaries of the geographic townships of Dennison and Louise, and the Lake Panache area. Currently, the Ontario Ministry of Transportation is undergoing discussion in regards to extending the freeway through Den-Lou. As of 2016, Whitefish had a population of 219 people in 100 households.

Historically, Whitefish was a postal village along the Canadian Pacific Railway's Sudbury-Soo line, which ran parallel to the south of the Algoma Eastern Railway (AER). Its station was situated along the line west of Naughton and east of Victoria Mines, where a junction and spur line connected it to the AER. In 1908, it had a recorded population of 150, and had two stores, two hotels, and telegraph and express offices. Today, the main heritage building in the community is the Penage Hotel, which after its past as a railway hotel, functioned in various capacities as a hair salon, a bar, apartments, and a convenience store.

The community was home to the Whitefish Kipinä AC (later Speed AC), a youth sports club which was an affiliate of the Finnish-Canadian Amateur Sports Federation.

=== Beaver Lake ===
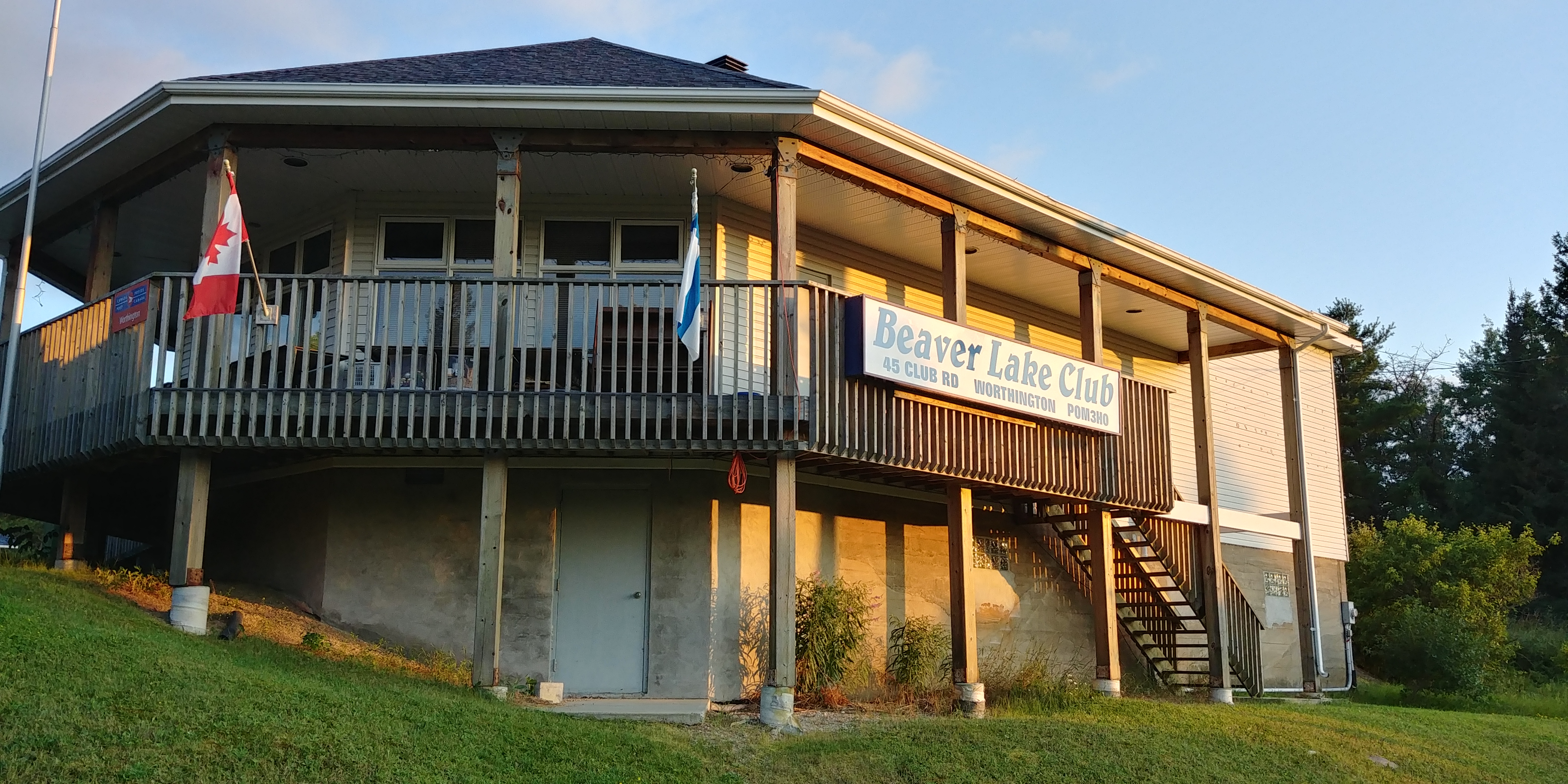
Exterior of the Beaver Lake Sports and Cultural Club

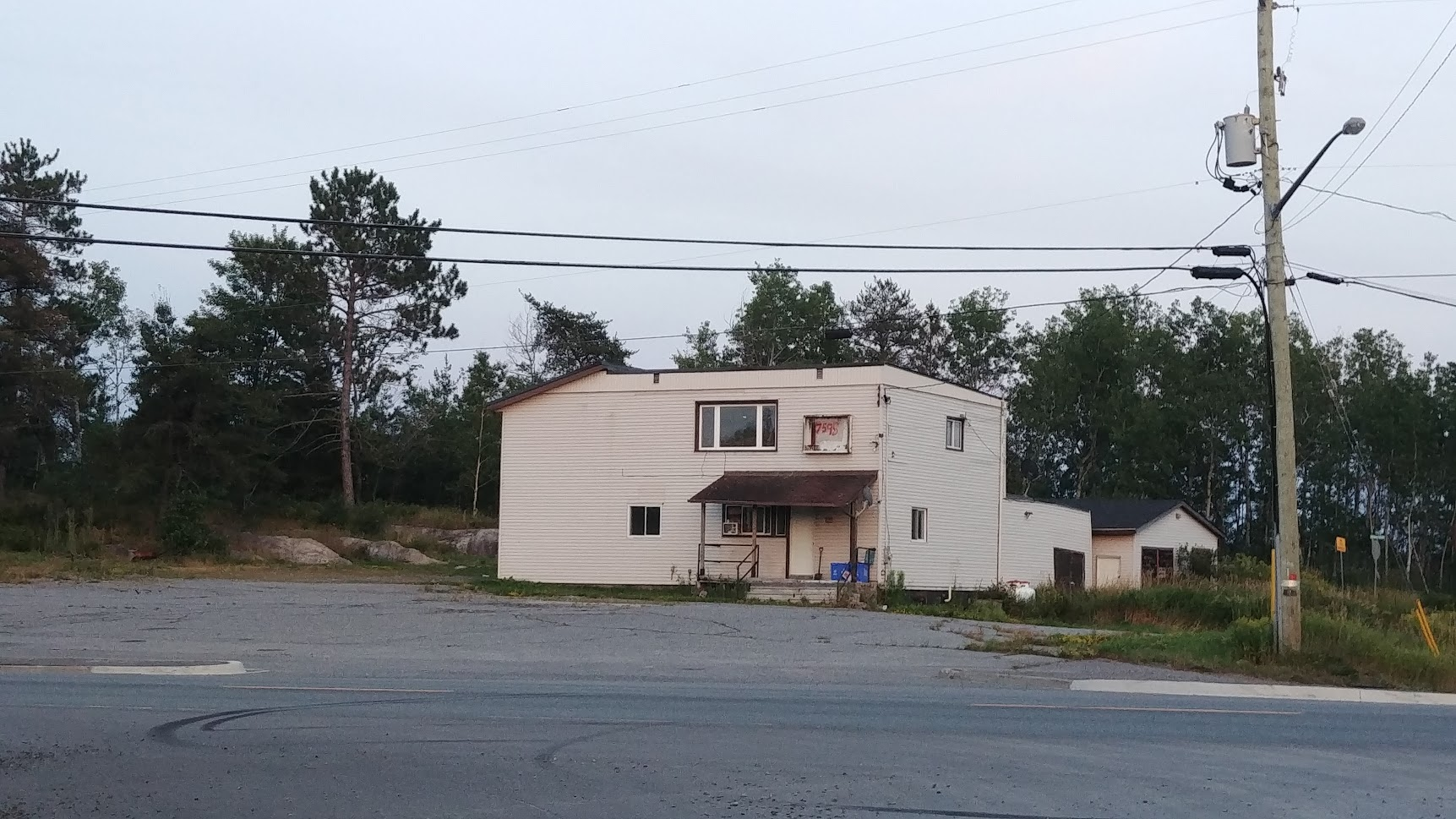
The former Beaver Lake General Store

The name "Beaver Lake" refers, generally, to the westernmost end of the former Town of Walden, along Highway 17 in the geographic township of Lorne, west of Whitefish. Like many communities in Northern Ontario, the modern history of Beaver Lake started with the building of the Canadian Pacific Railway through the area in the late 1880s. With the discovery of nickel deposits bringing jobs and settlers to the Sudbury area, Finnish immigrants in particular settled in the Beaver Lake area, south of the CPR line between Sudbury and Sault Ste. Marie, establishing farming homesteads centred around the lake and mostly producing milk as an export. The milk was often shipped by rail to Co-optas (in Copper Cliff) and later the Sudbury Producers and Consumers (P&C) Co-Operative Dairy, both local dairy co-operatives started and mostly operated by Finns and supported by the Finnish dairy farmers in the region. Later, the milk was processed by the Copper Cliff Dairy.

The Beaver Lake farms were hurt financially by the Great Depression and the aging group of original settlers had mostly shut down their working farms by the 1950s, with many of the lots being subdivided and sold off. Nevertheless, many of their descendants continue to live in the area, which is heavily influenced by Finnish culture, though the single-room schoolhouse and general store were both casualties of this community crisis.

The community was also known for its Jehu AC youth athletics club, which was an affiliate of the Finnish-Canadian Amateur Sports Federation (FCASF). Founded in 1921, club members won victories while competing against athletes from Sudbury, Creighton, Timmins, and South Porcupine, as well as many other communities. Jehu AC was known for its dominance in cross-country skiing, a sport which Finnish settlers had brought with them to Canada and which was popularized by Finnish athletics clubs before its general acceptance as a Canadian sport. This was evident as late as 1961, when Beaver Lake athletes won five out of nine cross-country ski events at the Port Arthur (now Thunder Bay) FCASF championship. As the population aged and youth left the community to seek economic opportunities, the club membership began to shrink. Its last event took place in 1969, after which it would sell its sports field to the Beaver Lake Sports and Cultural Club. Today, the club's grounds mark the entry point for the Beaver Lake ski trails, which loop around and exit back at the club.

== Ghost towns ==
=== Creighton Mine ===
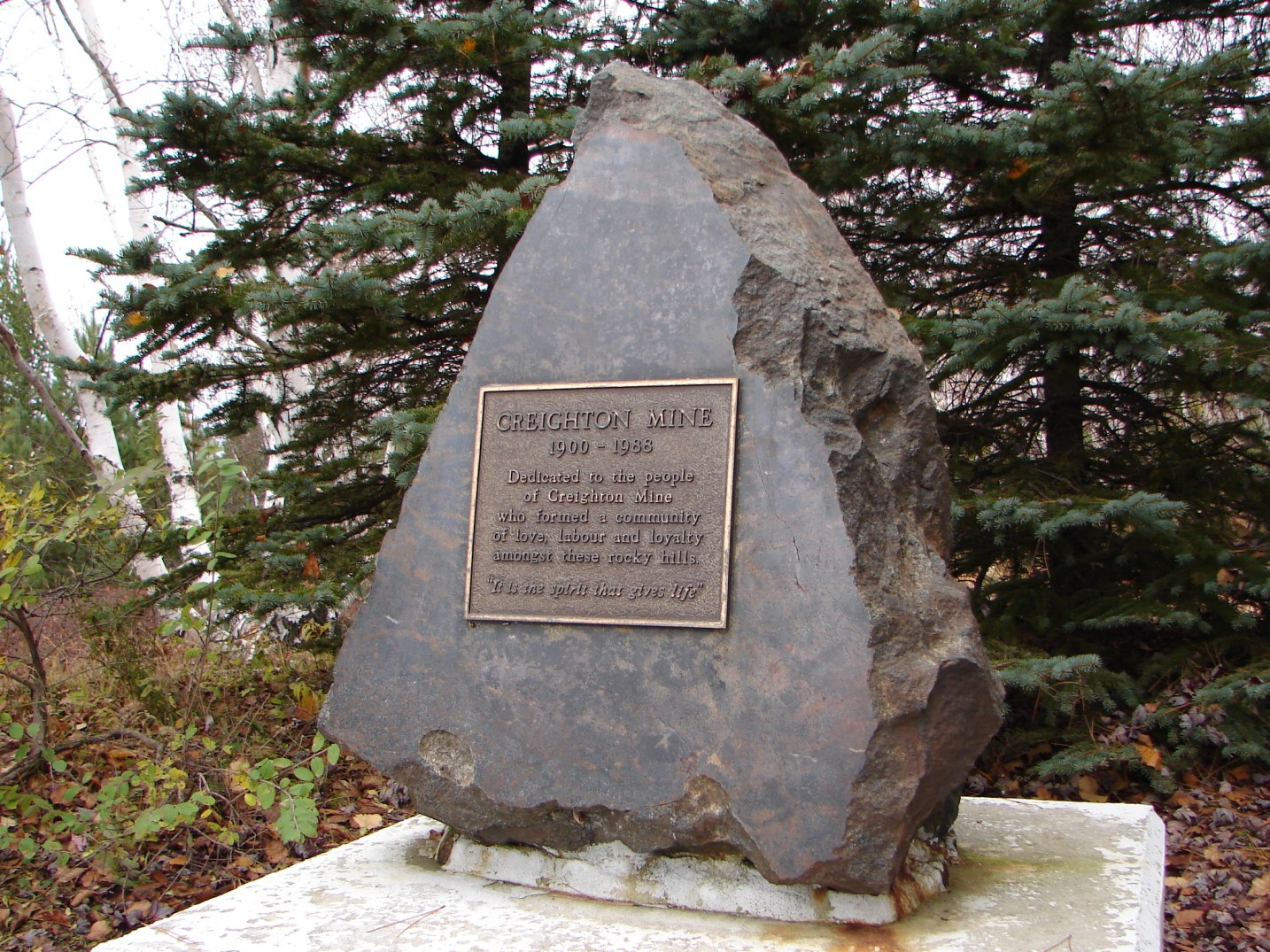
Marker stone at historic site of the community of Creighton Mine

Creighton Mine, also known as simply Creighton, is located near the intersection of Municipal Road 24 and Highway 144. The community, established in 1900 as an INCO company town, took its name from the geographic township in which it is located, which was named by the province of Ontario in the 1880s for MPP David Creighton.

The town had a population of around 2,200 at its peak in the 1940s, although the population slowly declined after improvements in the area's transportation networks made it easier for workers to live away from the company townsite.

In 1986, the town was closed down. and all of the town's homes and businesses were torn down or moved to Lively. Some residents initially fought the plan, but were not successful in convincing the company to change its plans. Upgrading the town's water, sewer, and road systems to contemporary standards would have cost the company over $10 million, a cost which the company deemed to be prohibitive. By 1989, most buildings had been demolished, and the town officially had no residents.

A few streets, sidewalks, and building foundations can still be found in the area. A monument was also placed in the community commemorating the people of Creighton.

The historic paymaster's cabin from Creighton was moved to the Anderson Farm Museum where an annual reunion continues to bring former residents and family together to share their memories of their former community.

The mine is also the site of the Sudbury Neutrino Observatory.

=== High Falls ===
High Falls is a ghost town located near the junction of the Spanish River with Agnew Lake, at the westernmost boundary of the city.

The town was created in 1904, when a hydroelectric dam and power plant were built on the Spanish River. This power plant, owned and operated by Vale Limited, supplied electric power to many of the area's mining towns, and is still operational today.

The town was closely connected to the nearby community of Turbine. However, in the 1960s, many families began to move away from the community for economic reasons, and by 1975 the community was virtually abandoned. Homes were demolished or relocated, and by the mid-1980s the power plant was the only remaining vestige of the community.

=== Victoria Mines and Mond ===
Victoria Mines, along with Mond, were located west of the community of Whitefish. Both were settled in 1899 as company towns for the Victoria Mine and smelter operated by the Mond Nickel Company. In 1913 the smelter closed, and the mine followed in 1923. None of the buildings remain at either settlement. Victoria Mines was the birthplace of Hockey Hall of Famer Hector "Toe" Blake.

=== Worthington ===
Worthington was located near the community of Beaver Lake. Worthington was settled in 1892 by employees of the Worthington Mine, and reached a population of around 400. In 1927, the mine collapsed, partially damaging the town. The mine permanently closed shortly after, and the original townsite was abandoned. Worthington continues to exist as a postal designation. None of the original buildings remain.

== Transportation ==
Some of Walden's various communities are served by GOVA's 101 Lively bus, which departs Naughton Community Centre for the downtown Sudbury transit terminal approximately every 2 hours, though there is more frequent service on weekday mornings. Along the way, it stops throughout Lively, Copper Cliff, and the west end of Sudbury, before terminating at the South End transit hub. As of 2019, there is no local bus service to the communities further to the west, such as Whitefish and Beaver Lake; however, GOVA also operates an auxiliary taxi service which covers as far as Whitefish.

No intercity transit is available in the Walden area despite most of its communities being situated along the Trans-Canada Highway. The closest intercity transit to the area is in downtown Sudbury, or alternatively an Ontario Northland flag stop in Nairn Centre.

== Education ==
Students in the English catholic stream attend St. James Catholic Elementary School St. Benedict Catholic Secondary School or Marymount Academy. Those in the English public stream attend either Whitefish's R.H. Murray Public School or Lively's Walden Public School for elementary education, and Lively District Secondary School for middle school and high school education. Those in the French public stream attend Helene Gravel and Macdonald Cartier. Those in the French Roman Catholic stream attend St-Paul, Sacré-Coeur and Collège Notre-Dame

== Media ==
Walden was previously served by monthly newspapers, the Walden Observer and later Walden Today. Neither are currently in production.

Walden is otherwise served by citywide media, although its proximity to the North Shore region means that residents of Whitefish, Beaver Lake and Worthington also have access to several radio stations, including CJJM-FM in Espanola, CFRM-FM in Little Current and CKNR-FM in Elliot Lake, whose signals do not reach the main urban core of Sudbury, as well as Espanola-area rebroadcasters of Sudbury's CBCS-FM and CBON-FM.

== Notable people ==
- Art Ross was inducted into the Hockey Hall of Fame in 1949. Regarded by many as the greatest defenceman of his era. Art Ross Trophy named in his honour and awarded to the leading scorer of the NHL regular season
- Toe Blake was inducted into the Hockey Hall of Fame as a coach and player.
- Bud Cullen, former Canadian Federal Judge and former MP for Sarnia-Lambton, was born in Creighton Mine, ON.
- Andrew Desjardins, drafted as a free agent in 2010 by the San Jose Sharks. Desjardins went on to play for the Chicago Blackhawks, winning the Stanley Cup in 2015.
- Meagan Duhamel, Canadian pairs figure skater, Olympic Gold Medalist-2018
- France Gélinas, the current Member of Provincial Parliament for Nickel Belt, is a resident of Naughton.
- Bud Germa, former MPP for Sudbury.
