= Spanish River (Ontario) =

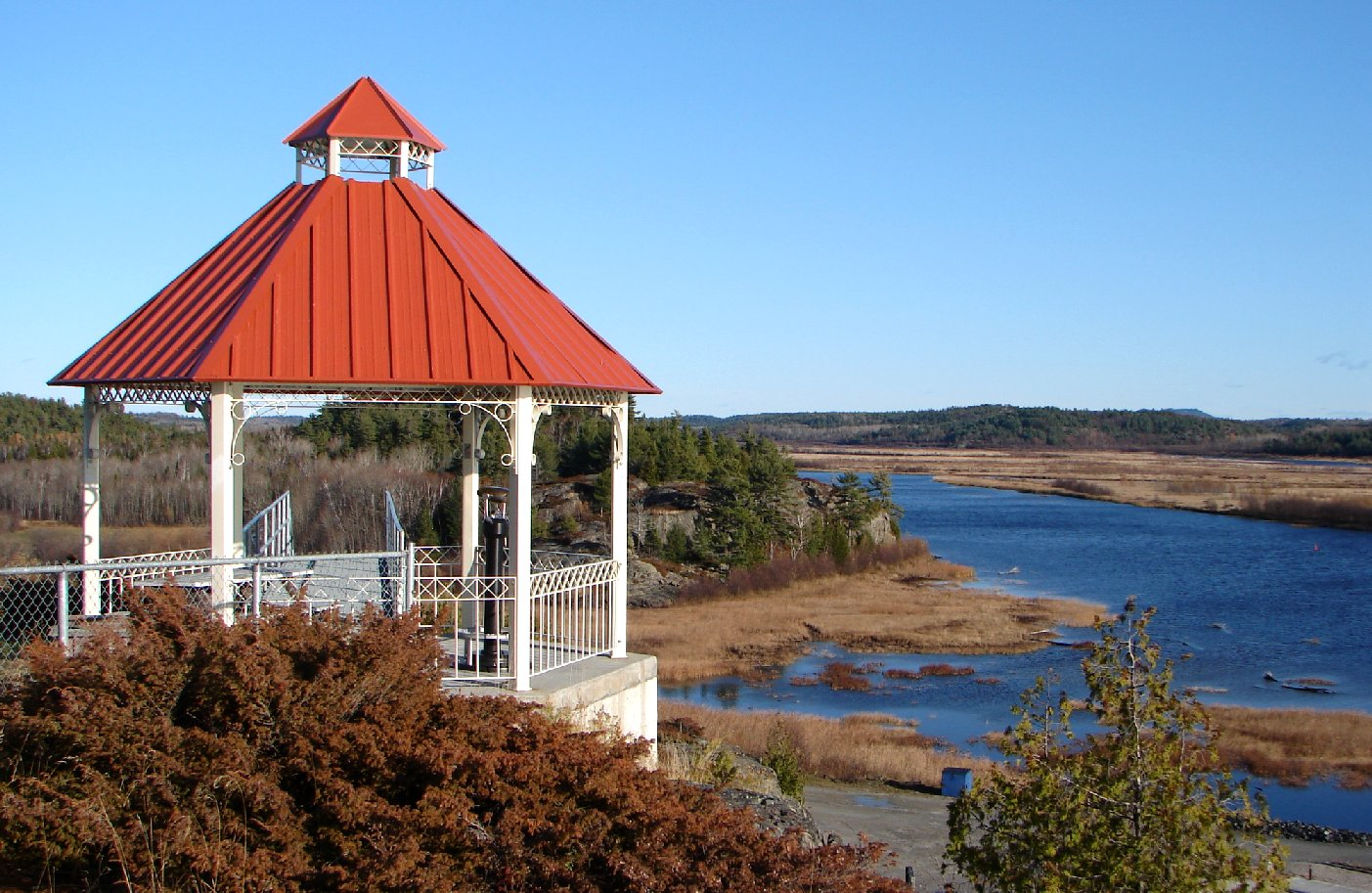
- Mouth of the Spanish River at the Town of Spanish

- Location of the mouth of the Spanish River in Ontario

Location
- Country: Canada
- Province: Ontario

Physical characteristics
- Source: Biscotasi Lake
  - location: Unorganized Sudbury, Sudbury District
  - coordinates: 47°17′40″N 82°00′00″W
- 2nd source: Alligator Lake
  - location: Unorganized Sudbury, Sudbury District
  - coordinates: 47°25′35″N 81°51′54″W
- Source confluence
  - location: Unorganized Sudbury
  - coordinates: 47°02′15″N 81°51′12″W
- Mouth: North Channel (Lake Huron)
  - location: Spanish, Algoma District
  - coordinates: 46°11′04″N 82°18′41″W
- Length: 338 km (210 mi)
- Basin size: 14,000 km^{2} (5,400 sq mi)
- Discharge
  - average: 150 m^{3}/s (5,300 cu ft/s)

The Spanish River is a river in Algoma District, Sudbury District and Greater Sudbury in Northeastern Ontario, Canada. It flows 338 kilometres (210 mi) in a southerly direction from its headwaters at Spanish Lake (west branch) and Duke Lake (east branch) to its mouth at the North Channel of Lake Huron just outside the community of Spanish.

The river's name and the name of the nearby towns of Espanola and Spanish are said to be due to French explorers and Jesuit priests encountering Ojibwe peoples speaking Spanish in the area, apparently as a result of a Spanish woman having been taken captive during an expedition far to the south.

The Spanish River is a provincially significant canoe route with lots of swifts and whitewater. It is therefore mainly used for recreational canoeing and has been protected as a waterway provincial park. There are four hydroelectric dams on the river: one, known as Big Eddy, above High Falls forming Agnew Lake; High Falls dam about a kilometre below Big Eddy dam; Nairn Falls dam about 12 kilometres (7.5 mi) below High Falls and the other at the Domtar mill in Espanola.

== Geography ==
The river is located almost entirely within the Sudbury District, except for brief passages into the city of Greater Sudbury near the communities of High Falls and Turbine and the river mouth in Algoma District.

Tributaries include Pogamasing Creek, Mogo River, Agnes River, the River aux Sables, the Vermilion River and the Wakonassin River.

The Lower Spanish River Forest houses the world's oldest red pine and white pine forests, and much of that is under provincial protection in the form of provincial parks and reclamation acts.

== History ==
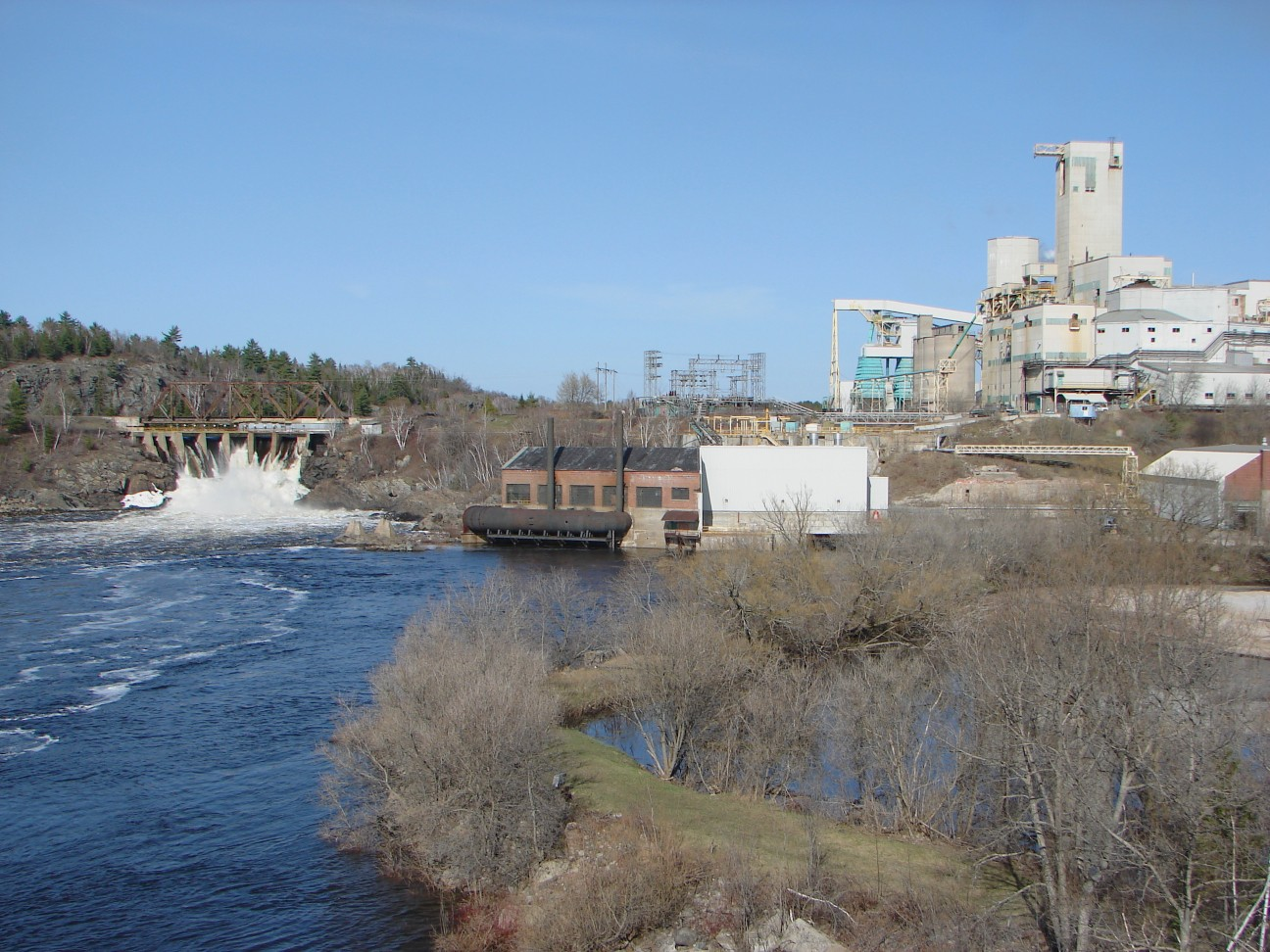
Spanish River and Domtar Mill in Espanola

The Spanish River has been used as a transportation corridor for thousands of years, initially by First Nations and later in the 19th century by fur traders. During the late 19th and mid 20th centuries, the river was used to transport timber from logging camps in the upper Sudbury District to Georgian Bay, where they were towed by tugs to sawmills on the Great Lakes. Until the mid-1960s, pulp wood, mainly jack pine, was driven down the river to the paper mill in Espanola. A diesel tug towed large rafts of logs the length of Agnew Lake to big Eddy dam where they were sluiced down a flume by crews with hand held pike poles. Secondary flumes took them past the High Falls and Nairn Falls power plants and on to Espanola. The sap and bark from the pulp logs was a major pollution source in the lower river.

In 1910, the river was the scene of a dramatic train derailment. It took place at the Canadian Pacific Railway bridge upstream from Espanola and downstream from the High Falls dam, about 5 miles (8 km) west of the town of Nairn.

== Fauna ==
Fish species found in the Spanish River are:

- Alewife
- Black Crappie
- Bluntnose Minnow
- Bowfin
- Brown Bullhead
- Brook Stickleback
- Burbot
- Chinook Salmon
- Cisco / Lake Herring
- Coho Salmon
- Common Carp
- Fathead Minnow
- Johnny Darter
- Lake Sturgeon
- Lake Trout
- Lake Whitefish
- Largemouth Bass
- Muskellunge
- Northern Pike
- Northern Redbelly Dace
- Pink Salmon
- Pumpkinseed
- Rainbow Smelt
- Rainbow Trout
- Silver Redhorse
- Shorthead Redhorse
- Rock Bass
- Smallmouth Bass
- Spottail Shiner
- Trout-Perch
- Walleye
- White Sucker
- Yellow Perch

== Spanish River Provincial Park ==
Spanish River Provincial Park
- IUCN category II (national park)
- Coordinates: 46°52′32″N 81°46′27″W
- Area: 35,386 ha (136.63 sq mi)
- Designation: Waterway
- Established: 2001
- Visitors: 2,413 (in 2022)
- Governing body: Ontario Parks
- Website: www.ontarioparks.com/park/spanishriver

The Spanish River Provincial Park protects most of the river and its banks, from its source at Biscotasi Lake (which is separately protected in the Biscotasi Lake Provincial Park) to Agnew Lake. Also included in the park is the entire East Spanish River, Mogo River, as well as large swaths of old-growth white and red pine forest along the course of the Spanish River.

It was established in 2006 and is intended to provide recreational paddling opportunities, in particular for canoeists of intermediate skill level. The park area is also popular for fishing, hunting, and camping.

Despite its remoteness, it is an operational park requiring permits for its use. Facilities included 83 backcountry campsites. All park sites and portages are currently maintained by park staff.

== Hydroelectricity ==
There are 5 hydro-electric generating stations on the Spanish River, 4 of which are owned and operated by Vale Limited to provide power to their mining operations in Sudbury.

Installation	Capacity	Head	Year built	Operator	Notes
Big Eddy Generating Plant	29.6 MW	30.33 m (99.5 ft)	1928	Vale	Agnew Lake serves as its reservoir.
High Falls No.1 Generating Plant	10 MW		1905	Vale	Works in conjunction with Big Eddy generating plant as a "cascade system": High Falls No.1 and No.2 plants use the water that passes through Big Eddy plant/dam.
High Falls No.2 Generating Plant	7.9 MW		1917	Vale	Works in conjunction with Big Eddy generating plant as a "cascade system": High Falls No.1 and No.2 plants use the water that passes through Big Eddy plant/dam.
Nairn Falls Generating Plant	4.75 MW		1915	Vale	11.3 km (7.0 mi) downstream of High Falls; works in conjunction with High Falls No.1 and No.2 and the Big Eddy generating plant as a "cascade system".
Espanola Generating Station	16 MW	19.5 m (64 ft)	1945/1993	Domtar	Run-of-the-river generating station; produces up to 30% of the power needed to operate the adjacent pulp and paper mill.

== See also ==
- List of rivers of Ontario
