= Greater Sudbury Municipal Road 55 =

Municipal road

Greater Sudbury Municipal Road 55
- Old Highway 17; Lorne Street; Douglas Street; Brady Street; Lloyd Street; The Kingsway

Route information
- Maintained by Greater Sudbury Municipal Transportation Department
- Length: 40.9 km (25.4 mi)

Major junctions
- West end: Highway 17 (Southwest Bypass) / TCH
- East end: Highway 17 (Southeast Bypass) / TCH

Location
- Country: Canada
- Province: Ontario
- Major cities: Greater Sudbury

Highway system
- County roads in Ontario
- Greater Sudbury Municipal Roads

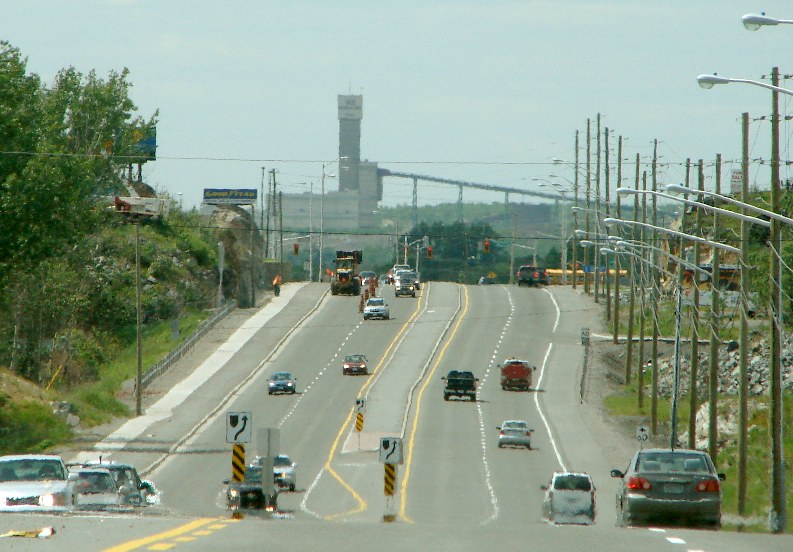
The Kingsway near 3rd Avenue with the Frood Mine in the distance.

Greater Sudbury Municipal Road 55 is a municipal road in the city of Greater Sudbury, Ontario, Canada. Extending from Whitefish to Coniston under a variety of street names, most of the road's length is a former alignment of Highway 17 and the Trans-Canada Highway except for a short realignment on different streets through the city's downtown core.

The road's western terminus is a grade-level intersection with Highway 17 just west of Whitefish, approximately one kilometre east of where the four-lane freeway segment of Highway 17 begins. The intersection is expected to be converted to a full freeway interchange as the freeway is extended westward. Through the Walden area, the road's only official street name is Municipal Road 55, although the informal name Old Highway 17 may also be used. In Waters, just west of Municipal Road 24 into Lively, the road widens into a dual carriageway, and interchanges with Highway 17 just east of Mikkola. This portion of the route was decommissioned as part of the provincial highway system in 1980 with the construction of the freeway segment.

From the Mikkola interchange easterly, however, the route continued to hold the Highway 17 designation until the completion of the Southeast Bypass in 1995. This portion of the route continues east as an at-grade expressway into Copper Cliff, where the median narrows to a paved strip until reaching the Big Nickel Road interchange. At that interchange, the road narrows back down to a single carriageway, albeit one with multiple lanes of traffic in each direction, and no longer has any access control. The roadway also picks up its first true street name, Lorne Street, at the same interchange. Lorne Street continues to travel in a northeasterly direction into Downtown, where the MR55 designation transfers onto Douglas Street; this represents the route's main divergence from the former route of Highway 17, which continued along Lorne past the Douglas Street intersection.

MR55 follows Douglas Street a short distance easterly until a sharp bend in the road. The road then becomes Brady Street and continues into the city's downtown core. The street name later transitions to Lloyd Street, reconnecting with the former Highway 17 route, and later to The Kingsway. In 2008, the section of The Kingsway east of Falconbridge Road underwent a $6 million expansion from two lanes to four lanes. The city has also planned a short westerly extension of the Kingsway, which will bypass the primarily residential Lloyd Street by connecting the Kingsway directly to the existing intersection of Lloyd and Brady Streets; however, no time frame for this project has been announced as of 2019.

The road's eastern terminus is a signalized grade-level intersection with Highway 17 near Coniston. East of that intersection, the current route of Highway 17 is a continuation of the MR55 roadway — traffic using the highway's through route must turn at the intersection.

== Rerouting ==
In 2015, MR 55 was rerouted through downtown Sudbury. The former route followed Lorne Street to Elm Street (MR35), and then traveled east along Elm Street to an intersection with MR80. MR55 continued straight through the intersection becoming Lloyd Street. The former route rejoins the current route a short distance later at the intersection with Brady Street.

== Future ==
As the freeway alignment of Highway 17 is extended eastward and westward from its existing termini, Municipal Road 55 may also be expanded to incorporate additional segments of the current highway alignment.

The Ministry of Transportation is currently undertaking planning studies on a further realignment of the Highway 17 route through Nickel Centre toward Markstay. As well, a six-kilometre westerly extension of the existing freeway alignment in the Whitefish area, including a conversion of the existing Municipal Road 55 intersection to a full interchange, is currently in the planning stage. However, actual construction dates have not yet been announced for either project as of 2016.

== Major intersections ==
The following table lists the major junctions along Greater Sudbury Municipal Road 55. The entire route is located in Greater Sudbury.

Location	km	mi	Destinations	Notes
Whitefish	0.0	0.0	Highway 17 / TCH – Sault Ste. Marie	Western terminus; follows Old Highway 17; continues as Highway 17 west
Whitefish	1.6	0.99	Municipal Road 10 south (Panache Lake Road)	Formerly Highway 549 south
Whitefish	2.4	1.5	Municipal Road 3 west (Bay Street)	No access to Highway 17
Whitefish	5.6	3.5	Crosses Vermilion River	
Lively	17.1	10.6	Municipal Road 24 north (Main Street)	Formerly Highway 536 north
Lively	18.7	11.6	Highway 17 (Southwest Bypass) / TCH	Interchange
Copper Cliff	24.3	15.1	Municipal Road 30 north (Power Street)	
Copper Cliff	25.4	15.8	Municipal Road 32 north (Balsam Street)	
Gatchell	27.1	16.8	Municipal Road 34 north (Big Nickel Road) to Municipal Road 35 (Elm Street)	Interchange; to Big Nickel; becomes Lorne Street
Gatchell	27.3	17.0	Municipal Road 37 south (Kelly Lake Road)	
South End	29.0	18.0	Municipal Road 40 south (Martindale Road)	To Municipal Road 43 east
South End	30.0	18.6	Municipal Road 46 south (Regent Street)	To Highway 69 south
West End	30.1	18.7	Municipal Road 38 north (Regent Street)	
Downtown Sudbury	30.4	18.9	Municipal Road 49 north (Lorne Street) / Douglas Street	Municipal Road 55 follows Douglas Street; former Highway 17 follows Lorne Street
Downtown Sudbury	31.3	19.4	Municipal Road 67 (Elgin Street)	No direct access; eastbound traffic must exit via Grey Street, while westbound traffic must use the Brady and Elgin access points to the YMCA parking lot.
Downtown Sudbury	31.7	19.7	Municipal Road 80 (Paris Street)	Formerly Highway 69 north
Downtown Sudbury	32.1	19.9	Municipal Road 51 east (Elgin Street)	One-way pair
Downtown Sudbury	32.2	20.0	Municipal Road 53 west (Cedar Street)	One-way pair
Downtown Sudbury	32.3	20.1	Municipal Road 35 west (Lloyd Street)	To Highway 144 north; Municipal Road 55 follows Lloyd Street and Kingsway; resumes following former Highway 17
Minnow Lake	34.0	21.1	Municipal Road 70 south (Bancroft Drive)	
New Sudbury	35.8	22.2	Municipal Road 66 north (Barry Downe Road)	
New Sudbury	36.3	22.6	Municipal Road 86 north (Falconbridge Highway); Municipal Road 72 south (Second Avenue N)	Formerly Highway 541 north; to Sudbury Airport
Minnow Lake	39.5	24.5	Municipal Road 74 south (Moonlight Avenue)	
	40.9	25.4	Highway 17 (Southeast Bypass) / TCH – North Bay	Eastern terminus; continues as Highway 17 east
1.000 mi = 1.609 km; 1.000 km = 0.621 mi: Incomplete access
