= Minnow Lake =

Minnow Lake may refer to:

- Minnow Lake (Minnesota), a lake in Clearwater County
- Minnow Lake, Ontario, a residential area in Sudbury, Ontario
