= List of numbered roads in Greater Sudbury =

List of numbered municipal roads

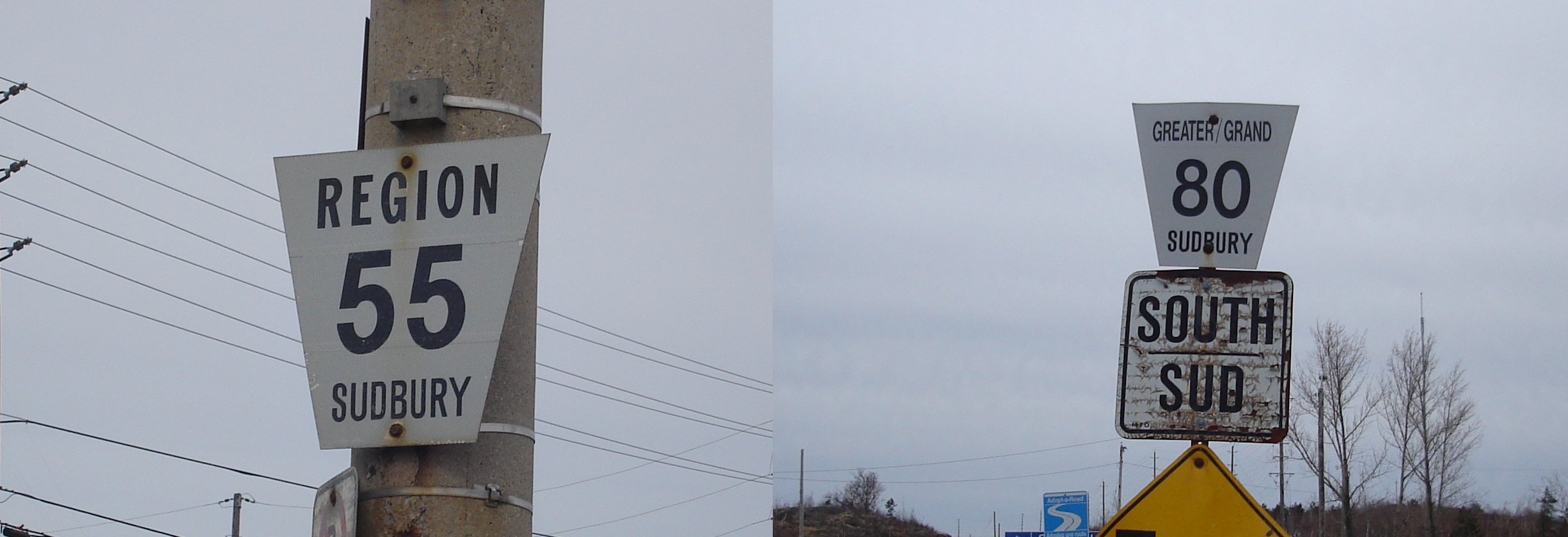
Municipal road signage in Greater Sudbury. The sign style shown on the left was posted on regional roads prior to the city's amalgamation in 2001, while the sign style on the right was posted after amalgamation.

This article lists all of the numbered municipal roads in Greater Sudbury, Ontario. Municipal roads in Greater Sudbury are generally numbered with odd numbers for east-west routes and even numbers for north-south routes.

The city of Greater Sudbury is the only census division in Northern Ontario that maintains a system of numbered municipal roads. County or municipal road systems otherwise exist only in Southern Ontario; in the rest of the Northern region, provincially maintained secondary highways serve a similar function. Several of the city's municipal roads were also numbered as secondary highways prior to the creation of the current municipal road system in 1973.

Prior to the amalgamation of the current city of Greater Sudbury, the numbered road system was maintained by the Regional Municipality of Sudbury, and the roads were designated as regional, rather than municipal, roads.

| Number | Names | Western/Southern Terminus | Eastern/Northern Terminus | Major Communities | Comments |
|---|---|---|---|---|---|
| Greater Sudbury Municipal Road 3 | Bay Street | MR 4 | MR 55 | Whitefish | Crosses over but does not interchange with Highway 17, just east of the Highway 17/MR 55 intersection. |
| Greater Sudbury Municipal Road 4 | Fairbank Lake Road | Highway 17 | Intersection of Wickie Road and Park Road | Worthington | Travels through the ghost town of Victoria Mines; formerly Highway 658. |
| Greater Sudbury Municipal Road 5 | Spanish River Road | municipal boundary with township of Nairn and Hyman | MR 4 in Worthington | Turbine | An alternate route to MR 55 and Highway 17, also links MR 4 and MR 3 to Highway 17. At the western city limits, the roadway continues as McIntyre Street in Nairn Centre. |
| Greater Sudbury Municipal Road 8 | Nickel Street, Third Avenue, Mine Road | Highway 144 | Mine Road | Onaping, Levack | Main road into Onaping and Levack. Formerly Highway 544 and Highway 544A. |
| Greater Sudbury Municipal Road 10 | Panache Lake Road | Panache North Shore Road | MR 55 | Whitefish | Formerly Highway 549 |
| Greater Sudbury Municipal Road 12 | Gordon Lake Road | MR 13 | Highway 144 | Larchwood | Gordon Lake Road (MR 12) ends at Vermilion Lake Road (MR 13) near the Vermilion River bridge and continues south as a private road known as the Lockerby Mine Access Road to MR 3 near Whitefish. |
| Greater Sudbury Municipal Road 13 | Vermilion Lake Road, Joseph Street | Mina Street | Highway 144 | Larchwood, Hull | Listed as Ontario's Worst Road in October 2007. |
| Greater Sudbury Municipal Road 14 | Errington Avenue, Main Street | Highway 144 | MR 15 | Chelmsford | |
| Greater Sudbury Municipal Road 15 | Municipal Road 15, Main Street | Intersection of Highway 144 and MR 35 | MR 80 | Chelmsford, Boninville, Blezard Valley, Val Caron | Formerly Highway 634 |
| Greater Sudbury Municipal Road 18 | Montée Rouleau, Gagnon Street | MR 35 | MR 15 | Azilda | |
| Greater Sudbury Municipal Road 21 | Notre-Dame Street | MR 35 | MR 35 | Azilda | Travels through the community of Azilda |
| Greater Sudbury Municipal Road 24 | Municipal Road 24, Main Street | MR 55 | Highway 144 | Lively | Passes by the ghost town of Creighton Mine; formerly Highway 536. |
| Greater Sudbury Municipal Road 30 | Power Street, Godfrey Drive | MR 55 | MR 32 | Copper Cliff | The route formerly followed Clarabelle Mine Rd., which is owned and maintained by Vale Inco. The road was closed to the public in the spring of 2007. |
| Greater Sudbury Municipal Road 32 | Balsam Street | MR 55 | MR 30 | Copper Cliff | |
| Greater Sudbury Municipal Road 34 | Big Nickel Mine Road | Interchange with MR 55 | MR 35 | Gatchell/Little Britain | Big Nickel is located on this road; effectively a two-lane freeway as it has no intersections except its termini and the entrance to Dynamic Earth. Listed on new eastbound signage on MR 55 as Big Nickel Road, it was previously known as LaSalle Boulevard in the late 70s and well into the 1980s. On May 7, 2004 the Big Nickel Mine Rd. bridge collapsed on a roadway below known as Lorne Street during the reconstruction of the bridge. No one was hurt in the incident. |
| Greater Sudbury Municipal Road 35 | Elm Street | MR 55 | Intersection of Highway 144 and MR 15 | Chelmsford, Azilda, Downtown | Former routing of Highway 144, until opening of the city's Northwest Bypass in 1986. Historic Murray Mine site located on this road. A section of Municipal Road 35 between the eastern intersection of Notre-Dame Street (Municipal Road 21) in Azilda to Highway 144 in Chelmsford is currently a two-lane highway. There are plans to widen that section of highway, although no date has been announced. Construction to widen Municipal Rd. 35 is set to begin in the fall of 2018. |
| Greater Sudbury Municipal Road 37 | Kelly Lake Road | Southview Drive | MR 55 | Robinson | |
| Greater Sudbury Municipal Road 38 | Regent Street, Beatty Street | Intersection with MR 55 and MR 46 | Intersection with MR 42 and MR 58 | Little Britain | Basically an extension of MR 46 and MR 58 |
| Greater Sudbury Municipal Road 39 | Ramsey Lake Road | MR 80 | Kirkwood Drive | south shore of Ramsey Lake | Science North is located near this road's western terminus at MR 80, while Laurentian University is located near the eastern terminus. |
| Greater Sudbury Municipal Road 40 | Martindale Road | Intersection of MR 40, MR 46 and MR 47 | MR 55 | Robinson | Basically an extension of MR 47 |
| Greater Sudbury Municipal Road 42 | Frood Road, Elm Street | MR 71 | MR 67 | Downtown/Donovan/Northern Heights | Has a brief concurrency with MR 55; access road to Frood Mine. Briefly was the first original route of Highway 547 from 1956 to 1960. |
| Greater Sudbury Municipal Road 43 | Ontario Street, McLeod Street, Hyland Drive | MR 40 | MR 46 | Gatchell | |
| Greater Sudbury Municipal Road 45 | York Street | MR 46 | MR 80 | near downtown | |
| Greater Sudbury Municipal Road 46 | Regent Street | Interchange with Highway 69 (future Highway 400) and Highway 17 | Intersection with MR 55 and MR 38 | Lo-Ellen/Four Corners/Lockerby | Portion from the city / region limits to MR 55 (Lorne Street) was originally Ontario Highway 69 until it was downloaded to the Region in 1980. |
| Greater Sudbury Municipal Road 47 | Walford Road | Intersection of MR 40 and MR 46 | MR 80 | Lockerby | Basically an extension of MR 40 |
| Greater Sudbury Municipal Road 49 | Lorne Street | MR 55 | MR 35 | Downtown | Former route of MR 55 |
| Greater Sudbury Municipal Road 51 | Larch Street | MR 67 | MR 49 | Downtown | |
| Greater Sudbury Municipal Road 53 | Cedar Street | MR 67 | MR 49 | Downtown | |
| Greater Sudbury Municipal Road 55 | Old Highway 17, Lorne Street, Douglas Street, Brady Street, Lloyd Street, The Kingsway | Highway 17, west of Whitefish | Highway 17, 3 km west of Coniston | Whitefish, Naughton, Lively, Copper Cliff, Gatchell, Downtown, Minnow Lake, Coniston | Former alignment of Highway 17. Surrendered this designation in Walden with the construction of freeway alignment in the early 1980s, and in the old city of Sudbury when the Southeast Bypass was constructed in 1995. Is a dual carriageway for part of its length. |
| Greater Sudbury Municipal Road 57 | Van Horne Street | MR 80 | MR 67 | Downtown | |
| Greater Sudbury Municipal Road 58 | Kathleen Street | Intersection of MR 42 and MR 38 | MR 80 | Donovan/Flour Mill | Basically an extension of MR 38 |
| Greater Sudbury Municipal Road 61 | Ste-Anne Road | Intersection of Mackenzie Street and MR 67 | MR 80 | Downtown | |
| Greater Sudbury Municipal Road 63 | College Street | Intersection of 35/55 | MR 58 | Downtown | |
| Greater Sudbury Municipal Road 66 | Barry Downe Road | MR 55 | MR 73 | New Sudbury | |
| Greater Sudbury Municipal Road 67 | Elgin Street, Morris Street, Howey Drive, Bellevue Avenue, Bancroft Drive, Allan Street, Government Road, East Street, Birch Street | Intersection with MR 55 and MR 61 | Highway 17 | Downtown, Brodie, Minnow Lake, Adamsdale, Coniston | |
| Greater Sudbury Municipal Road 68 | Auger Avenue | MR 86 | MR 71 | New Sudbury | |
| Greater Sudbury Municipal Road 70 | Bancroft Drive | MR 67 | MR 55 | Minnow Lake | Bancroft Drive continues as MR 67 from Bellevue Avenue to Allan Street in Coniston. |
| Greater Sudbury Municipal Road 71 | LaSalle Boulevard | Interchange with MR 35 | MR 86 | New Sudbury | West of Lorraine Avenue, westbound traffic continues at a loop ramp interchange where MR 73, Maley Drive transitions to LaSalle Boulevard while eastbound traffic splits where MR 86 Maley Drive begins near Collège Boréal. Phase 2 construction of Maley Drive will see LaSalle Boulevard as a 4 laned undivided expressway from west of a roundabout at the entrance to Collège Boréal to the interchange with MR 35 Elm Street. Big Nickel Mine Road was previously a western extension of LaSalle Boulevard in the late 70s well into the 1980s. |
| Greater Sudbury Municipal Road 72 | Second Avenue | MR 67 | Intersection of MR 55 and MR 86 | Minnow Lake | Continues as MR 86 |
| Greater Sudbury Municipal Road 73 | Maley Drive | Interchange with MR 71 | MR 86 | New Sudbury | Turns into MR 71 east of Collège Boréal where westbound LaSalle Boulevard traffic enters at an interchange in a loop ramp and eastbound traffic splits where Maley Drive begins. Maley Drive is a 4 lane divided freeway at the LaSalle Boulevard split interchange to a roundabout with MR 66 and continues as a 4 lane divided expressway to a roundabout with Lansing Avenue. |
| Greater Sudbury Municipal Road 74 | Moonlight Beach Road | MR 67 | MR 55 | Adamsdale | |
| Greater Sudbury Municipal Road 80 | Long Lake Road, Paris Street, Notre-Dame Avenue (Sudbury), Old Highway 69, Notre-Dame Avenue (Hanmer), Côté Boulevard | Intersection of Dew Drop Road and Tilton Lake Road | MR 85 | Four Corners, Downtown, Val Caron, Val Thérèse, Hanmer | Route from intersection with MR 55 north to Capreol Road was formerly part of Ontario Highway 69. It was downloaded to the Region in the early 1980s. The Long Lake Road portion (from Four Corners to Dew Drop Road) was once Highway 543. |
| Greater Sudbury Municipal Road 84 | Capreol Road, Sellwood Avenue, Milnet Road | MR 80 | Dead-end in the woods at the Greater Sudbury/Sudbury District border | Hanmer, Capreol, Sellwood | The ghost town of Milnet can easily be reached by turning onto a sideroad and driving for roughly 1 km. Part from Milnet to Sellwood Mine was part of Highway 806, and the rest of the road was part of former Highway 545. |
| Greater Sudbury Municipal Road 85 | Radar Road | MR 86 | MR 80 | Hanmer | Along with MR 84, formerly part of Highway 545. |
| Greater Sudbury Municipal Road 86 | Falconbridge Highway, Skead Road | Intersection of MR 55 and 72 | Skead | New Sudbury, Garson, Skead | Has an old diversion (Old Skead Road). Continues as MR 72. Sudbury Airport is located on this road. Formerly Highway 541. |
| Greater Sudbury Municipal Road 88 | Elmview Drive | MR 80 | Dominion Drive | Hanmer | |
| Greater Sudbury Municipal Road 89 | Longyear Drive | MR 86 | Edison Road | Falconbridge | Formerly Highway 541A |
| Greater Sudbury Municipal Road 90 | Garson-Coniston Road | Highway 17 | MR 86 | Garson, Coniston | |
| Greater Sudbury Municipal Road 93 | Second Avenue | MR 67 | Highway 17 | Coniston | |
| Greater Sudbury Municipal Road 96 | Desmarais Road | MR 80 | Intersection with Nelson Lake Road and Frenchman Lake Road | Val Thérèse | |
| Greater Sudbury Municipal Road 97 | Capreol Lake Road | MR 84 | Intersection of 4th Fire Road, 5th Fire Road, and 6th Fire Road, half-way between Capreol and the Wahnapitae 11 Indian Reserve | Capreol | |
| Greater Sudbury Municipal Road 537 | Greater Sudbury Road 537 | Highway 537 at Finni Road | Highway 17 | Wahnapitae | Formerly part of Highway 537. |
