= Lake Road =

Lake Road may refer to:

- Lake Road (Western New York) in the United States
- Vermilion Lake Road in Sudbury, Ontario, Canada
- Lake Road in Taiping Lake Gardens Perak, Malaysia
- Ohio State Route 531
- Tennessee State Route 78
