= Greater Sudbury Municipal Road 35 =

Road in Ontario, Canada

Greater Sudbury Municipal Road 35
- Old Highway 114; Elm Street; Lloyd Street

Route information
- Maintained by Greater Sudbury Municipal Transportation Department
- Length: 18.8 km (11.7 mi)

Major junctions
- West end: Highway 144 at Chelmsford
- East end: Municipal Road 55 in Downtown Sudbury

Location
- Country: Canada
- Province: Ontario
- Major cities: Greater Sudbury

Highway system
- County roads in Ontario
- Greater Sudbury Municipal Roads

Greater Sudbury Municipal Road 35 is a municipal road in the city of Greater Sudbury, Ontario, Canada. Extending from Chelmsford to Downtown Sudbury, most of the road's length is a former alignment of Highway 144, save for a short segment the city's downtown core which is a former alignment of Highway 17 and the Trans-Canada Highway.

== Route description ==
Sudbury Municipal Road 35 begins in Chelmsford at the intersection of Highway 144 and Sudbury Municipal Road 15 and travels east under the informal name of Old Highway 144 to Azilda, where turns in a southeasterly direction. In New Sudbury it passes through a trumpet interchange with Lasalle Boulevard. East of Big Nickel Road it assumes the name of Elm Street and passes through Little Britain and Downtown Sudbury. At Municipal Road 80 (Notre Dame Avenue/Paris Street), the roadway becomes Lloyd Street, before reaching Brady Street a few blocks further east and ending at Municipal Road 55; Municipal Road 55 continues east along Lloyd Street.

== History ==
Highway 144 originally passed through the INCO mine property north of Copper Cliff and entered Sudbury along Spruce Street and Regent Street, but was realigned in the 1970s to follow Elm Street where it terminated at Highway 17 at Lorne Street. In 1987 the Northwest Bypass was opened at Highway 144 was rerouted to bypass Downtown Sudbury, resulting in the establishment of Regional Road 35.

In 2015, Municipal Road 55 was rerouted through downtown Sudbury, bypassing segments of Lorne Street, Elm Street, Lloyd Street in favour of Douglas Street and Brady Street. As part of the project, Municipal Road 35 was extended 1.2 km (0.75 mi) east along Elm Street and Lloyd Street, while the bypassed section of Lorne Street became Municipal Road 49.

== Future ==
The City of Greater Sudbury had widened Municipal Road 35 between the eastern intersection of Municipal Road 21 (Notre Dame Street) in Azilda to Highway 144 in Chelmsford to four lanes. Construction began in the fall of 2018 with a culvert replacement contract. The completion of widening of Municipal Road 35 was expected to be completed in 2021 and was fully completed in 2022.

== Major intersections ==
The following table lists the major junctions along Greater Sudbury Municipal Road 35. The entire route is located in Greater Sudbury.

Location	km	mi	Destinations	Notes
Chelmsford	0.0	0.0	Highway 114 / Northwest Bypass to Highway 17 – Lively, Timmins; Municipal Road 15 north	Municipal Road 35 western terminus; continues as Highway 144 north
Azilda	3.0	1.9	Municipal Road 12 east (Nortre Dame Street West)	Original Highway 144 alignment
Azilda	7.3	4.5	Municipal Road 12 west (Nortre Dame Street East)	Original Highway 144 alignment
Azilda	7.8	4.8	Municipal Road 18 north (Montée Rouleau) Gagnon Street	
	14.6	9.1	Municipal Road 71 east (Lasalle Boulevard)	Interchange
	16.0	9.9	Municipal Road 34 west (Big Nickel Road); To Highway 17 west / Highway 69 south	
Little Britain	17.1	10.6	Municipal Road 38 south (Regent Street) / Beatty Street	
Downtown Sudbury	17.6	10.9	Municipal Road 63 north (College Street); Municipal Road 49 south (Lorne Street)	Former Highway 144 southern terminus; formerly Highway 17 west; Municipal Road 35 follows former Highway 17 east
Downtown Sudbury	17.8	11.1	Municipal Road 42 north (Frood Road)	
Downtown Sudbury	17.9	11.1	Municipal Road 61 north / Municipal Road 67 south (Elgin Street)	
Downtown Sudbury	18.4	11.4	Municipal Road 80 (Notre Dame Avenue / Paris Street)	Becomes Lloyd Street
Downtown Sudbury	18.8	11.7	Municipal Road 55 (Brady Street / Lloyd Street); To Highway 17 east	Municipal Road 35 eastern terminus; continues as Municipal Road 55 east (Lloyd Street)
1.000 mi = 1.609 km; 1.000 km = 0.621 mi
