= Ontario Highway 536 =

Ontario provincial highway

Highway 536

Route information
- Maintained by the Ministry of Transportation and Communications, Ontario
- Length: 5.4 km (3.4 mi)
- Existed: 1956–1973

Major junctions
- South end: Highway 17
- North end: Creighton Mine

Location
- Country: Canada
- Province: Ontario

Highway system
- Ontario provincial highways; Current; Former; 400-series
← Highway 535	→ Highway 537

Secondary Highway 536, commonly referred to as Highway 536, was a provincially maintained secondary highway in the Canadian province of Ontario. This highway connected Highway 17 near Lively with Wellington Street at the Creighton Mine. Highway 536 followed most of what is now Municipal Road 24, north from Greater Sudbury Road 55 (Old Highway 17). The route existed from 1956 until the formation of the Regional Municipality of Sudbury in 1973.

== Route description ==
Highway 536 followed what is now Sudbury Municipal Road 24, travelling north from Highway 17 (now Sudbury Municipal Road 55) near Lively to the mines in Creighton. Highway 536 travelled north from Highway 17, passing through the community of Lively, where it was known as Main Street. As it left Lively, it began making a very gradual curve towards the northeast, passing through Dogpatch and skirting the southern edge of the Creighton Mine. It eventually curved east briefly before making a quick 90 degree curve north into the mining town of Creighton. This curve was located at the modern intersection with Wellington Street, and was replaced with an intersection with Highway 144 upon the completion of the Northwest Bypass in the mid-1980s.

== History ==
The route of Highway 536 was first assumed by the Department of Highways in early 1956, along with several dozen other secondary highways. It remained unchanged until the formation of the Regional Municipality of Sudbury on January 1, 1973. That year, the route was transferred to the region and decommissioned as a provincial highway.

== Major intersections ==
The following table lists the major junctions along Highway 536, as noted by the Ontario Department of Highways. The entire route was located in Sudbury District.

Location	km	mi	Destinations	Notes
Lively	0.0	0.0	Highway 17 – Sault Ste. Marie, Sudbury	Present-day Municipal Road 55
Creighton	5.4	3.4	Creighton Mine	
1.000 mi = 1.609 km; 1.000 km = 0.621 mi
