= Ontario Highway 541 =

Former Ontario provincial highway

Highway 541

Route information
- Maintained by the Ministry of Transportation and Communications
- Length: 24.1 km (15.0 mi)
- Existed: 1956–c. 1973

Major junctions
- South end: Highway 17 (in 1973)
- Highway 541A – Falconbridge; Highway 545 – Hanmer, Capreol
- North end: Station Road – Skead, Ontario

Location
- Country: Canada
- Province: Ontario

Highway system
- Ontario provincial highways; Current; Former; 400-series
← Highway 540	→ Highway 541A

Secondary Highway 541, commonly referred to as Highway 541, was a provincially maintained secondary highway in the Canadian province of Ontario. The highway connected Highway 17 in Sudbury with the community of Skead on the southern shores of Lake Wanapitei, passing through the community of Garson en route. Within the urban region of Sudbury, the highway served to access Sudbury Airport. The designation was applied in 1956, along with many of the secondary highways in Ontario. The province transferred responsibility for the route shortly after the creation of the Regional Municipality of Sudbury in 1973. Highway 541 is now known as Sudbury Municipal Road 86, following Falconbridge Highway and Skead Road.

== Route description ==
The roads that the former Highway 541 designation was applied to are today known as Falconbridge Highway and Skead Road, or collectively as Sudbury Municipal Road 86. A majority of the 24.1-kilometre-long (15.0 mi) route passes through developed urban areas of Sudbury, though portions of it north and south of Sudbury Airport are surrounded by undeveloped lands. The designation began in the south at Kingsway, today known as Sudbury Municipal Road 55, but the route of Highway 17 through Sudbury in 1973. It progressed northeast through Sudbury, leaving the urban area north of Garson and entering an area with several aggregate quarries. The route curved east and encountered an intersection; to the east was Highway 541A (now Sudbury Municipal Road 89) towards Falconbridge, while to the north Highway 541 continued. South of this intersection, the road was known as Falconbridge Highway, whereas north of the intersection was known as Skead Road.

Continuing north, the route passed through a non-urbanized area, though still surrounded by houses at regular intervals in addition to more quarries. At Bailey Corners, the highway encountered Highway 545, which continued to the communities of Hanmer and Capreol; drivers continuing along Highway 541 were required to turn. Now travelling east, the route passed Sudbury Airport and several more quarries as it gradually meandered to the northeast. At the community of Skead, located at the southernmost point of Lake Wanapitei, the route ended at Station Road, with the roadway continuing north as a local street.

Geographically, Highway 541 travelled through the Sudbury Basin, the second largest impact crater on Earth as well as one of the oldest. The mineral deposits here made mining the principal industry in Sudbury for much of its history.

== History ==
The route of Highway 541 was first assumed by the Department of Highways in early 1956, along with several dozen other secondary highways. A significant portion of the route followed the Falconbridge Highway, a road constructed in 1937 to connect Sudbury with the mining deposits located in the area several decades earlier. The remainder followed the Skead Road, which travelled north to the southern tip of Lake Wanapitei. It remained unchanged for the next 17 years, until the formation of the Regional Municipality of Sudbury, now Greater Sudbury, in 1973. By 1974, the highway was transferred to the region. Today it is known as Sudbury Regional Road 86.

== Major intersections ==
The following table lists the major junctions along Highway 541, as noted by the Ontario Department of Highways. The entire route was located in Greater Sudbury.

Location	km	mi	Destinations	Notes
Barrydowne	0.0	0.0	Municipal Road 55 (Kingsway)	Formerly Highway 17
Garson	8.4	5.2	Garson–Coniston Road	Now known as Sudbury Municipal Road 90
Garson	10.5	6.5	Highway 541A (Falconbridge Highway) – Falconbridge	Highway 541 turned north onto Skead Road at this intersection; Highway 541A now known as Sudbury Municipal Road 89
Bailey Corners	16.0	9.9	Highway 545 (Radar Road) – Hanmer, Capreol	Highway 541 turned east at this intersection; Highway 545 now known as Sudbury Municipal Road 85
	18.3	11.4	Air Terminal Drive – Sudbury Airport	
Skead	24.1	15.0	Station Road	Roadway continues north as a local street
1.000 mi = 1.609 km; 1.000 km = 0.621 mi
