= Ontario Highway 549 =

Former Ontario provincial highway

Highway 549
- Greater Sudbury Municipal Road 10, Panache Lake Road

Route information
- Maintained by the Ministry of Transportation and Communications, Ontario
- Length: 14.4 km (8.9 mi)
- Existed: 1956–1982 or 1983

Major junctions
- South end: Lake Panache
- North end: Highway 17 (Whitefish, Ontario)

Location
- Country: Canada
- Province: Ontario

Highway system
- Ontario provincial highways; Current; Former; 400-series
← Highway 548	→ Highway 550

Ontario Highway 549, commonly referred to as Highway 549, was a provincially maintained secondary highway in the Canadian province of Ontario. This highway connected former Highway 17 (Regional Road 55) in Whitefish to Lake Panache. The route was assumed along with many other secondary highways in 1956 and remained unchanged until the early 1980s, when it was decommissioned as a provincial highway and transferred to the newly formed Regional Municipality of Sudbury. Today it is known as Greater Sudbury Road 10.

== Route description ==
Highway 549 followed what is now Sudbury Municipal Road 10 (Panache Lake Road). It travelled through a largely forested region between Lake Panache and what was then Highway 17, but is now known as Municipal Road 55. At Lake Panache, the route began near a marina and travelled north through thick forest, meandering east and west to avoid lakes and rivers. At one point along the route, it briefly passed into the territory of the Whitefish Lake First Nation. It encountered Municipal Road 55 just west of Whitefish and just east of the current route of Highway 17.

== History ==
Highway 549 was first assumed by the Department of Highways in 1956, along with several dozen other secondary highways. It was likely maintained as a development road prior to that. The route remained unchanged from then until 1982 or 1983, when it was decommissioned as a provincial highway and transferred to the Regional Municipality of Sudbury. The region redesignated the road as Sudbury Regional Road 6, but subsequently renumbered it as Regional Road 10 within the next two years. It remains this way today.

== Major intersections ==
The following table lists the major junctions along Highway 549, as noted by the Ontario Department of Highways. The entire route was located in Greater Sudbury.

Location	km	mi	Destinations	Notes
Lake Panache	0.0	0.0		
Whitefish	14.4	8.9	Highway 17 (Whitefish, Ontario)	Now known as Sudbury Municipal Road 55
1.000 mi = 1.609 km; 1.000 km = 0.621 mi
