= Vermilion Lake (Sudbury) =

Lake in Sudbury District, Ontario, Canada

- Location within Ontario
- Location: Sudbury, Ontario
- Coordinates: 46.52°N 81.41°W
- Basin countries: Canada
- Surface area: 11.266 km^{2} (4.350 sq mi)
- Max. depth: 12 m (39 ft)

Vermilion Lake is a lake in the city of Greater Sudbury, Ontario which is situated approximately 33 km west of downtown, in Fairbank Township. The lake's primary inflow and outflow is the Vermilion River. There is also a small creek that flows into Vermillion Lake, Cameron Creek. This creek connects Cameron lake and the Vermillion. The creek is unpassable except for canoe as the water level can only be a few inches. There is also a small set of rapids along the creek.

The main access road to residential and recreational properties on the lake is Vermilion Lake Road, near the neighborhood of Chelmsford. Vermilion Lake Road was voted as the worst road in Ontario in the Canadian Automobile Association's annual Ontario's Worst Roads survey in 2007.

Vermillion Lake provides a home for about 300 families. Minimal services are provided but the city, with fire hydrant service ending a few kilometers for Hwy 144. Primarily each residence has an independent fresh water system that is serviced by drilled wells the deepest of which can be 400 feet. Sewer systems are also independent with each home being serviced by a private septic systems.

Garbage and recycling pick up is provided by the city on a weekly basis. Mail is delivered to most residences at the end of their respective driveways. Volunteers provide fire service with one hall servicing the area, also Dowling fire hall will respond to fire calls in the area. Since no hydrants are available water is drafted from the lake or is trucked in by tanker to fight fires. Ambulance service is provided by the City of Greater Sudbury with the nearest ambulance being in Chelmsford and a Rapid Response paramedic responding from Levack. A certified landing pad for the air ambulance was located at the Vermillion Lake Park along Vermillion Lake Road, it was closed in 2023 with the city citing costs. This closure was protested by the residents and ward 3 counsellor Gerry Montpellier. Police Service is provided also by the city, with patrols originating from Azilda and downtown.

Many families enjoy the idea of the "lake life" living in the area. Many homes have docks in the summer as fishing and swimming are a normal occurrence. Many groups travel up the Vermillion River to one of many sand bars to swim. During the winter many ice huts dot the lake as people from near by communities as well as residences of the lake place the huts they may fish in comfort. Most properties are close to an hector large with many being much larger.

Vermillion Lake is also a recreational playground for many of the local communities. The "D" Trail of the OFSC runs on the south shore and can be accessed off the lake throw a closed mining site.

Vermillion lake was created when the logging company now known as Domtar placed a dam at the outflow portion of the Vermillion river. This created a stop flow of water flooding the area and creating the lake. The logging company used the lake to float timber to a collection station. Logging no longer occurs near the lake.

== See also ==
- List of lakes in Ontario
