= Elm Place, Greater Sudbury =

Elm Place
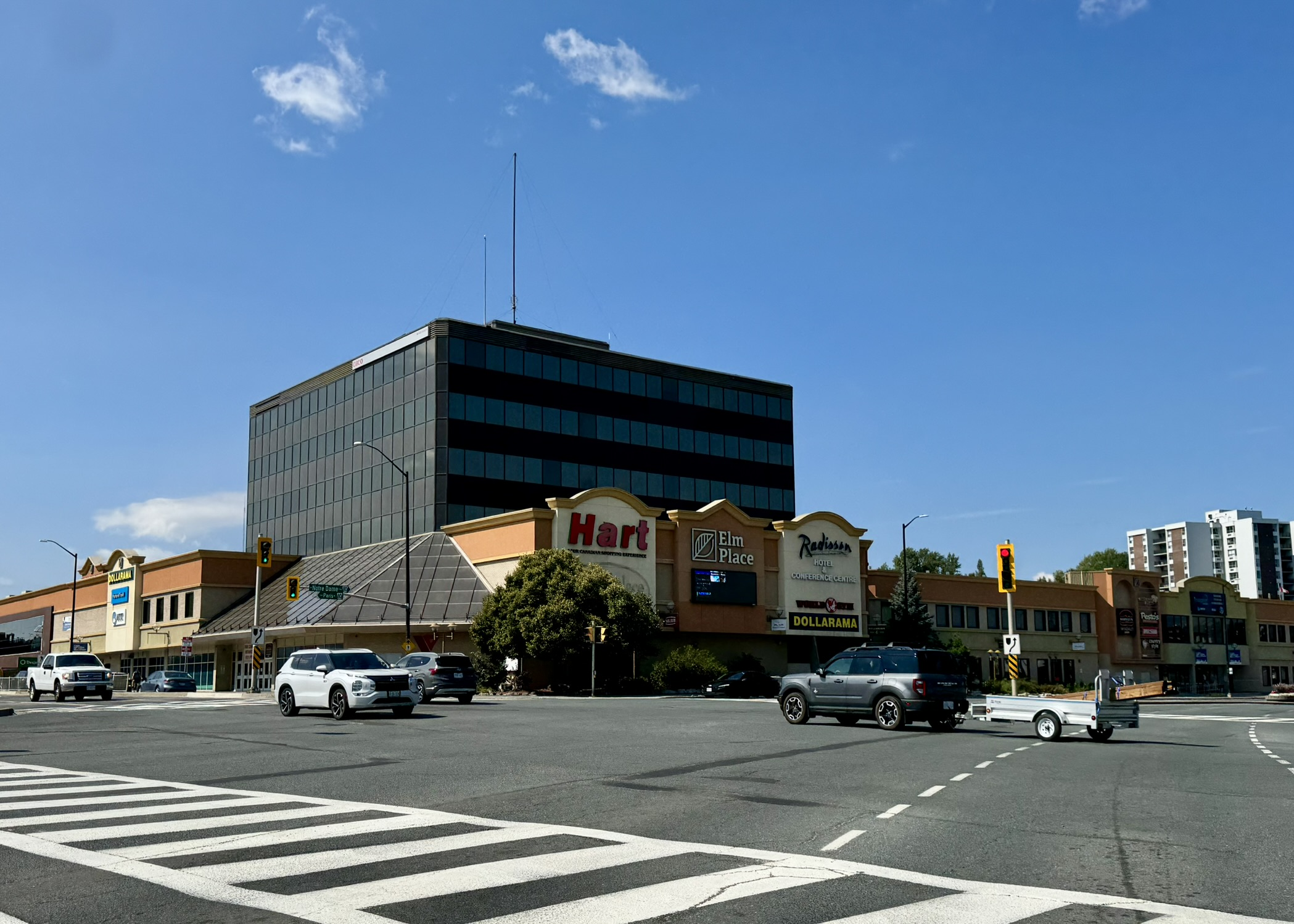
- Elm Place, 2025
- Location: Sudbury, Ontario
- Coordinates: 46°29′37″N 80°59′34″W
- Address: 40 Elm Street
- Previous names: City Centre, Rainbow Centre
- Owner: Vista Hospitality
- Floor area: 300,000 ft^{2} (28,000 m^{2})
- Parking: 950
- Website: elmplace.ca

The Elm Place Mall is a mall in Greater Sudbury, Ontario, Canada. It was built as part of the plan to demolish the Borgia Neighborhood in Sudbury in the early 1970s. It was bought in the early 2000s by Vista Hospitality, and is as of 2017 being managed under Robert Green. It was originally called the City Centre, or the Rainbow Centre, at the time of restoration project, but it was renamed in 2020 after a community renaming contest to Elm Place. The architecture is designed as a car-centric building, and the building often takes part in local mural projects by holding murals on its north facade.

== History ==
The Elm Place Mall is located on the site of the former Borgia Neighborhood. The Borgia Neighborhood was considered as slum housing consisting of very crowded simple wood-framed buildings, which was a result of the housing shortage at the time. To combat these issues and revitalize the area, there were plans for a major project intended for urban renewal in Sudbury. This plan started with the complete demolition of the Borgia Neighborhood in the 1970s. The first phase of this project was to move the shopping and entertainment centers away from the train tracks; this resulted in the development of the mall on Elm Street. The second phase of this development project added an extension to the mall. This urban renewal project produced a mall, office tower, and hotel which was called Rainbow Center at the time. The implementation of this mall permanently changed the atmosphere of the downtown core as the mall gained in popularity as being a one-stop shop for all household needs but caused a "steady decline of the independent businesses in the central city".

== Names ==
To select the new name, the Vista Group, which owns Elm Place, engaged the local community through a renaming contest. The "Rebrand the Rainbow" website invited residents to submit their suggestions, resulting in an overwhelming response with over "12,000 creative ideas" Elm Place emerged as the obvious choice in the public voting, receiving more than one-third of the online votes.

== Features ==
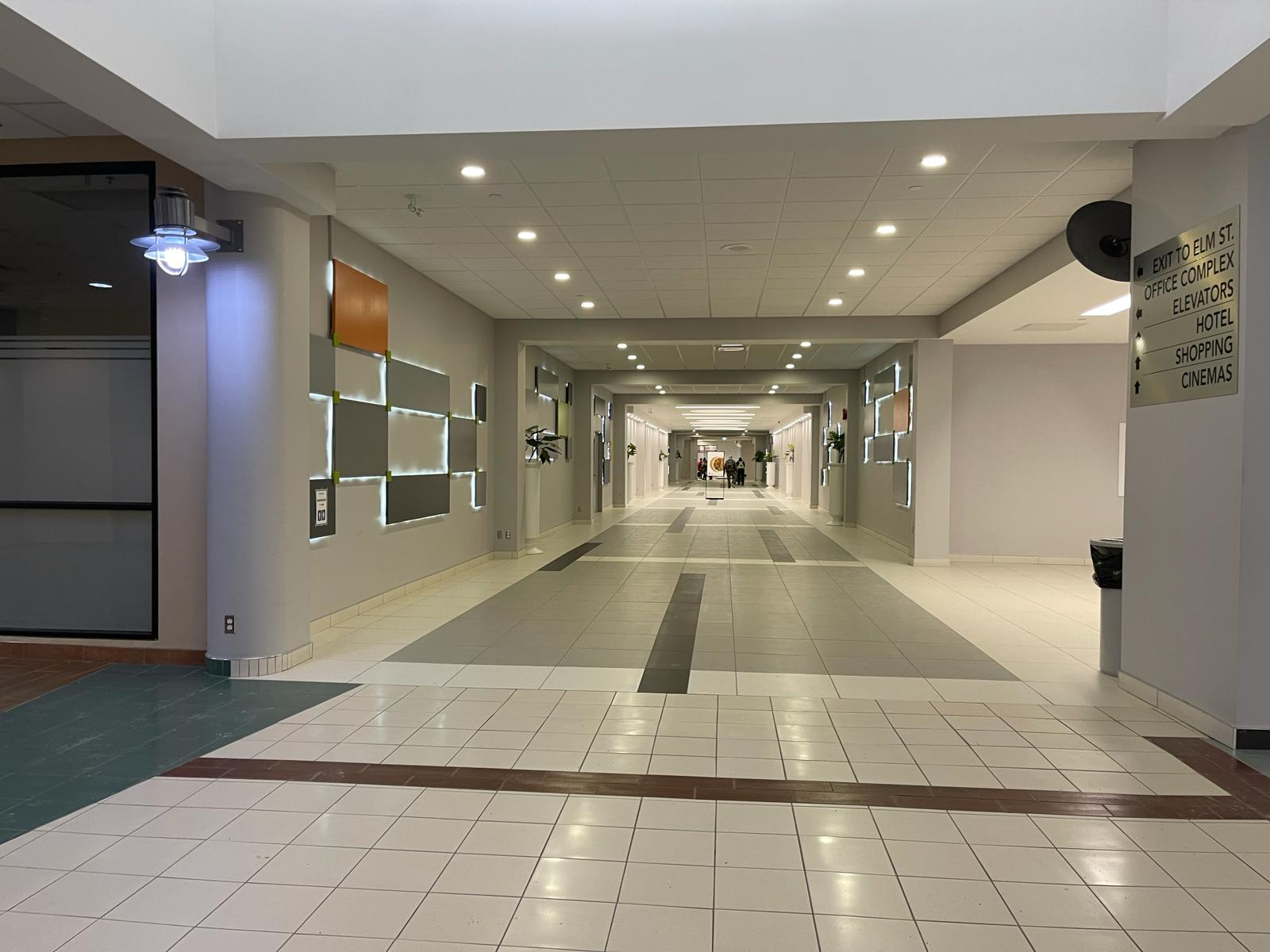
Elm Place, hallway, first floor

The Elm Place Mall opening facade along Elm Street is where the retail, residences, and office spaces are located. This development resulted in the construction of "900 residential units, a department store, a supermarket, a hotel, an office tower, and 750 parking spots". Elm Place was designed as a car-centric building; they completely altered the street along Elm to favor vehicle transportation in addition to adding interior parking so that visitors did not have to walk on the city street. The exterior is not only used for parking, the Elm Place Mall has also taken part in the art mural projects in Sudbury holding murals on its north facade. This creativity is carried through the interior on the upper floors displaying numerous historic photos of the early years in Sudbury. The mall contains a total of 350,000 square feet (33,000 m^{2}) of office space and 300,000 square feet (28,000 m^{2}) of retail space.

== Property management ==
The developers of Oshawa Group Limited bought out all the real estate buildings from Marchland Holding Ltd. In this process, they obtained the Elm Place Mall in November 1971. “The Oshawa Group is one of Canada’s largest suppliers of food, operating both the wholesale and retail sectors." Later in the early 2000s Vista Hospitality obtained Elm Place which is currently being managed under Robert Green as of 2017.
