= Southwest and Southeast Bypasses =

Limited-access highways in Sudbury, Ontario

Southwest Bypass / Southeast Bypass
- Southwest and Southeast Bypasses highlighted in red

Route information
- Part of Highway 17 / Trans-Canada Highway
- Maintained by Ministry of Transportation of Ontario
- Length: 24.3 km (15.1 mi)

Southwest Bypass
- Length: 13.3 km (8.3 mi)
- West end: Municipal Road 55
- Major intersections: Municipal Road 80
- East end: Highway 69

Southeast Bypass
- Length: 11.0 km (6.8 mi)
- West end: Highway 69
- East end: Municipal Road 55

Location
- Country: Canada
- Province: Ontario
- Major cities: Greater Sudbury

Highway system
- Ontario provincial highways; Current; Former; 400-series
- Greater Sudbury Municipal Roads

The Southwest Bypass and Southeast Bypass are two separately-constructed contiguous roads in the city of Greater Sudbury, in the Canadian province of Ontario, which form a bypass around the southern end of the city's urban core for traffic travelling on Highway 17, a portion of the Trans-Canada Highway. Most of the route is a Super two road with at-grade intersections, with the exception of short section of divided freeway at an interchange with Highway 69. Along with the Northwest Bypass from Lively to Chelmsford, the roads form a partial ring road around the city's urban core.

Although proposed as early as 1967, construction of the Southwest Bypass, connecting Highway 17 near Lively with Highway 69 south of Sudbury, didn't began until mid-1973. It opened as a two-lane route in late 1974, with no interchanges along its length. A four-lane bypass of Highway 17 between Lively and Whitefish was built between 1976 and late 1980, connecting to the Southwest Bypass at a new interchange with what is now known as Sudbury Municipal Road 55. Construction of the Southeast Bypass, connecting Highway 69 with Highway 17 west of Coniston, began in 1992 and was opened on November 9, 1994. Since then, while numerous proposals and studies have been undertaken on widening the route to a full freeway, only an interchange with Sudbury Municipal Road 80 (Long Lake Road) has been built, opening in 2008.

== Route description ==
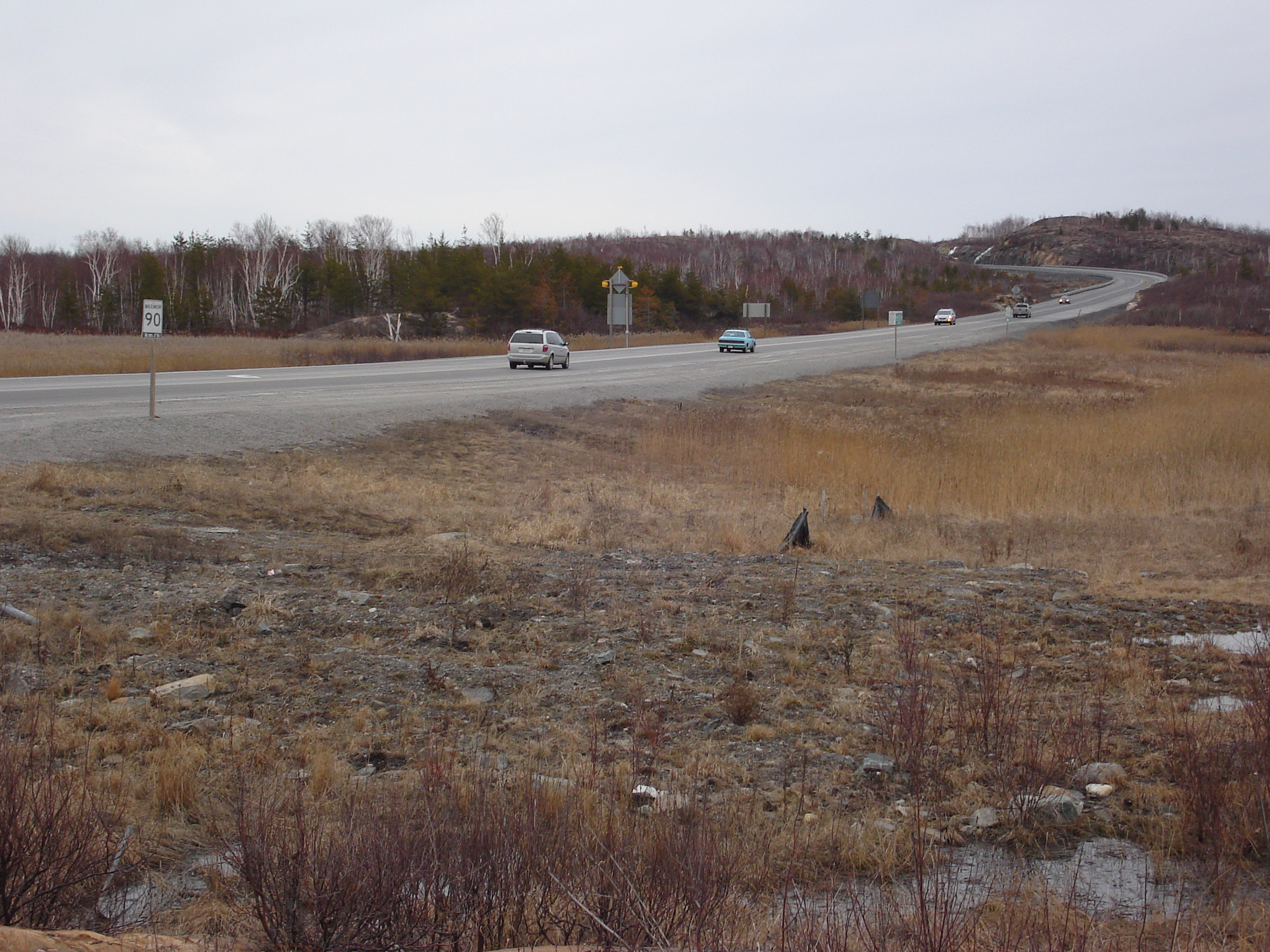
The Southwest Bypass east of its interchange with Long Lake Road (Municipal Road 80) before the interchange was built. Note the sign on the opposing side of the road, which alerted drivers to the upcoming signalised intersection

The Southwest Bypasses begin at an interchange with Sudbury Municipal Road 55, with Highway 17 continuing west towards Whitefish beyond the interchange. The four lane divided freeway immediately narrows to a two-lane road as it makes a broad turn from the southeast to the northeast and crosses Junction Creek. A 100-metre right of way was designated in the 1970s for expansion of the Southwest Bypass to four lanes at a future date. The route intersects Fielding Road north of the community of Mikkola as it continues curving northeast. It passes Fielding Memorial Park and bird sanctuary before travelling alongside the south shore of Kelly Lake. It makes another broad turn to the southwest, intersecting Southview Drive midway through the curve.

After intersecting Hannah Lake Road and Middle Lake Road, with views of their respective lakes nearby, the Southwest Bypass makes another broad curve to the east and then back southeast to avoid Silver Lake. It meets Sudbury Municipal Road 80 (Long Lake Road) at an interchange, then turns east to travel along the southern edge of urban Sudbury. Curving northeast, the route briefly widens to four lanes at an interchange with Highway 69, which also serves as the dividing point of the Southwest Bypass and the Southeast Bypass. The Southeast Bypass meanders northeast and then north for 11.1 kilometres (6.9 mi), passing between the Lake Laurentian Conservation Area and Daisy Lake Uplands Provincial Park. It meets no roads for its entire length, although the highway crosses above Municipal Road 67 (Bancroft Drive/Allan Street) as well as Armstrong Road at the Ottawa Valley Railway. The Southeast Bypass ends soon thereafter at a signalized intersection with Sudbury Municipal Road 55, approximately 2 kilometres (1.2 mi) west of Coniston. Traffic on Highway 17 must turn right to continue on the highway.

== History ==
Before construction of the bypasses, Highway 17 travelled through downtown Sudbury. Pictured is the 1965 Ontario Road Map.

Prior to the construction of the bypasses, Highway 17 followed what is now Municipal Road 55 (Lorne Street) into Sudbury from the west, while Highway 69 followed what is now Municipal Road 46 (Regent Street) into the city from the south. The two intersected and became concurrent along Lorne Street into the downtown. The paired highways turned east onto Elm Street, with Highway 69 splitting north onto Notre Dame Avenue (Municipal Road 80) at a location now occupied by the Rainbow Centre Mall. Highway 17 continued east along Lloyd Street and Kingsway towards Coniston.

A bypass of Sudbury was first considered in the 1967 "Planning Study for the Sudbury Southwest By-Pass" which concluded that a four-lane highway around Sudbury was required in the near future. Following the completion of the "Sudbury-North Bay Area Highway Planning Study" in 1973, construction of the 13.0-kilometre (8.1 mi) Southwest Bypass began by mid-year. The two-lane route, connecting Highway 17 near Lively with Highway 69 south of urban Sudbury, was opened ceremonially by the Highways minister on October 11, 1974. The project cost C$3.9 million ($23.4 million in 2023 dollars). It was considered part of the provincial highway system with the unposted number of Highway 7153.

Further highway needs studies were conducted along the entire Sudbury–Sault Ste. Marie corridor to identify a future four-lane corridor in 1974 and 1975. One of the first projects to begin following these studies was a 19.7-kilometre (12.2 mi) four-lane bypass of Highway 17 between Lively and west of Whitefish, on which construction started in 1976. The new route—connecting with the western end of the Southwest Bypass—was completed and opened to traffic on December 4, 1980, at a total cost of $30 million ($107 million in 2023 dollars).

Construction of the Southeast Bypass, including an interchange at Highway 69 to avoid interruptions during future four-laning, began in July 1992. The two-lane route was opened on November 9, 1994. Work began to convert the signalised intersection at Long Lake Road with a grade-separated interchange in June 2007. The new interchange was opened in December 2008.

== Future ==
The provincial government previously announced that the road would be converted to a freeway in the 2010s, around the same time that Highway 400 supersedes Highway 69 to Sudbury, although as of 2022 no firm date has been announced for commencement of construction. The Ministry of Transportation prepared and published its preferred plan for the southwest segment in the 2000s; planning on the southeast segment, from Highway 69 to Coniston with a potential further extension to Markstay, began in fall 2010. A preliminary four-lane plan for the southeast segment, as well as a new connection to Highway 69, was prepared in 1987 as part of the original route plan; however, due to a number of changes in the area, including the four-lane realignment of Highway 69 and the creation of Daisy Lake Uplands Provincial Park, modifications were needed to the final route plan.

In the Ministry of Transportation's current freeway conversion proposals for the bypass, access will be eliminated at all at-grade intersections. The plan has been criticized by Greater Sudbury City Councillor Terry Kett, due to the potential for an increased volume of traffic — particularly trucking traffic from the Walden Industrial Park on Fielding Road — spilling into the Mikkola subdivision.

== Exit list ==
The following table lists the major junctions along Southwest and Southeast Bypasses, as noted by the Ministry of Transportation of Ontario. The entire route is located in Greater Sudbury.

| km | mi | Destinations | Notes |
|---|---|---|---|
| 0.0 | 0.0 | Highway 17 west / TCH – Sault Ste. Marie Municipal Road 55 east (Old Highway 17) | Interchange; Southwest Bypass western terminus; original Highway 17 alignment |
| 1.9 | 1.2 | Fielding Road / Kantola Road | At-grade intersection; in the current expansion plan, this will become an overpass with no direct access to the freeway |
| 5.8 | 3.6 | Southview Drive | At-grade intersection; in the current expansion plan, this will become an underpass with no direct access to the freeway |
| 6.9 | 4.3 | Hannah Lake Road | At-grade intersection; in the current expansion plan, access will be provided via an extension of Treeview Road |
| 7.8 | 4.8 | Middle Lake Road | At-grade intersection; in the current expansion plan, access will be provided via an extension of Treeview Road |
| 9.9 | 6.2 | Municipal Road 80 (Long Lake Road) | Interchange opened in December 2008 |
| 13.3 | 8.3 | Highway 69 south / TCH – Parry Sound, Toronto; Municipal Road 46 north (Regent Street) | Original eastern terminus of bypass until November 9, 1994 |
| 24.3 | 15.1 | Highway 17 east / TCH – North Bay; Municipal Road 55 east (Kingsway) | At-grade intersection and eastern terminus of Southeast Bypass; traffic must turn to remain on Highway 17 |
1.000 mi = 1.609 km; 1.000 km = 0.621 mi
