= Ontario Highway 541A =

Former Ontario provincial highway

Highway 541A
- Longyear Drive, Falconbridge Highway

Route information
- Maintained by the Ministry of Transportation and Communications
- Length: 3.2 km (2.0 mi)
- Existed: 1956–c. 1973

Major junctions
- West end: Highway 541 – Garson
- East end: Falconbridge mine entrance

Location
- Country: Canada
- Province: Ontario

Highway system
- Ontario provincial highways; Current; Former; 400-series
← Highway 541	→ Highway 542

Secondary Highway 541A, commonly referred to as Highway 541A, was a provincially maintained secondary highway in the Canadian province of Ontario. This short 3.2-kilometre (2.0 mi) spur connected Highway 541 (now Greater Sudbury Road 86) north of Garson with the community of Falconbridge.

Highway 541A is now known as Municipal Road 89, and follows Longyear Drive. It was formally part of the Falconbridge Highway, and existed originally as a spur of Highway 541 when secondary highways were first introduced in 1956. The route gained its own designation by 1962, and continued to exist until the formation of the Regional Municipality of Sudbury, now Greater Sudbury, in 1973.

== Route description ==
Highway 541A was a short spur of Highway 541, connecting it to the large mines at Falconbridge. It began in the west at an intersection with Highway 541 at Skead Road, and travelled 3.2 kilometres (2.0 mi) east into the town, ending at the entrance to the mine. Most of the route is surrounded by undeveloped lands, except the final 700 metres (2,300 ft) that lie in the residential portion of Falconbridge.

== History ==
The route of Highway 541 was first assumed by the Department of Highways in early 1956, along with several dozen other secondary highways. The route formed a spur of Highway 541 originally, without its own designation; it did not gain its own route number until 1962. The highway followed the northernmost portion of the Falconbridge Highway, a road constructed in 1937 to connect Sudbury with the mining deposits located in the area several decades earlier. The route remained unchanged until the formation of the Regional Municipality of Sudbury, now Greater Sudbury, in 1973. By 1974, the highway was transferred to the region. Today it is known as Sudbury Regional Road 89.

== Major intersections ==
The following table lists the major junctions along Highway 541A, as noted by the Ontario Department of Highways. The entire route was located in Greater Sudbury.

Location	km	mi	Destinations	Notes
Garson	0.0	0.0	Highway 541 (Falconbridge Highway (south) / Skead Road (north)) – Sudbury	
Falconbridge	3.2	2.0	Falconbridge Mine entrance	Roadway continues east as Longyear Drive (private)
1.000 mi = 1.609 km; 1.000 km = 0.621 mi
