= Ontario Highway 545 =

Former Ontario provincial highway

Highway 545

Route information
- Maintained by the Ministry of Transportation and Communications
- Length: 33.9 km (21.1 mi)
- Existed: 1956–c. 1973

Major junctions
- South end: Highway 541
- North end: Milnet

Location
- Country: Canada
- Province: Ontario

Highway system
- Ontario provincial highways; Current; Former; 400-series
← Highway 542A	→ Highway 546

Secondary Highway 545, commonly referred to as Highway 545, was a provincially maintained secondary highway in the Canadian province of Ontario. This 33.9-kilometre (21.1 mi) highway connected Highway 541 at Bailey Corners near Garson with the now-abandoned community of Milnet, passing through Hanmer and Capreol. It followed what is now Municipal Road 85 (Radar Road), Municipal Road 84 (Capreol Road, Dennie Street, Sellwood Avenue, and Moose Mountain Mine Road), and Milnet Road. The route featured a concurrency with Highway 69 between Hanmer and Capreol.

Highway 545 was first designated in 1956, along with many other secondary highways in Ontario. It existed until the formation of the Regional Municipality of Sudbury—now known as Greater Sudbury—in 1973, after which it became the equivalent of a county road. Today it is known in various sections as Sudbury Municipal Road 84, Sudbury Municipal Road 85, Sellwood Avenue, Milnet Road and Highway 806.

== Route description ==
Today Highway 545 is known between Bailey Corners and east of Hanmer as Sudbury Municipal Road 85, along the former Highway 69 concurrency as Sudbury Municipal Road 84, and north of Capreol as Sellwood Avenue, Milnet Road and Highway 806.

The route began at a junction with Highway 541 (now Sudbury Municipal Road 85) as the through route and progressed northeast and then east through a mix of farmland and undeveloped areas. This section is now known as Radar Road in addition the Municipal Road 85 designation. Southeast of Hanmer, the route curved 90 degrees north to meet with Highway 69 (Cote Boulevard, now Municipal Road 80) east of the town. The two routes travelled north concurrently for 6.5 kilometres (4.0 mi) to Capreol, with Highway 69 ending at Hanna Street in that town and Highway 545 carrying on northwards to cross a railway and exit the town. It meandered northwards nearby the Vermilion River, now in the isolated forests of the Canadian Shield. At Milnet, 15 kilometres (9.3 mi) north of Capreol, Highway 545 ended and Highway 806 continued northeast to Sellwood.

== History ==
The route of Highway 545 was first assumed by the Department of Highways in early 1956, along with several dozen other secondary highways. Throughout its existence, Highway 545 connected Highway 541 at Bailey Corners with Highway 69 east of Hanmer. The route continued north of the northern terminus of Highway 69 in Capreol to Milnet. By 1965, Highway 806 branched west from Milnet to Sellwood. The route remained unchanged until the formation of the Regional Municipality of Sudbury, now Greater Sudbury, in 1973. By 1974, the highway was transferred to the region, along with Highway 806. Today it is known between Bailey Corners and east of Hanmer as Sudbury Municipal Road 85, along the former Highway 69 concurrency as Sudbury Municipal Road 84, and north of Capreol as Sellwood Avenue, Milnet Road and Highway 806.

== Major intersections ==
The following table lists the major junctions along Highway 545, as noted by the Ontario Department of Highways. The entire route was located in Greater Sudbury.

Location	km	mi	Destinations	Notes
Bailey Corners	0.0	0.0	Highway 541 (Skead Road) – Sudbury	
Hanmer	10.9	6.8	Highway 69 south – Sudbury, Toronto	Beginning of Highway 69 concurrency
Capreol	18.8	11.7	Hanna Street	Northern terminus of Highway 69
Milnet	33.9	21.1		Abandoned railway station
1.000 mi = 1.609 km; 1.000 km = 0.621 mi
