= Minnow Lake (Minnesota) =

Lake in the state of Minnesota, United States

- Location within Minnesota
- Location: Clearwater County, Minnesota
- Coordinates: 47°31′54″N 95°28′30″W
- Type: lake

Minnow Lake is a lake in Clearwater County, Minnesota, in the United States.

Minnow Lake was named from its population of small minnows.

== See also ==
- List of lakes in Minnesota
