= Greater Sudbury Municipal Road 13 =

Municipal road in Ontario, Canada

Greater Sudbury Municipal Road 13
- Vermilion Lake Road

Route information
- Maintained by City of Greater Sudbury
- Length: 12.2 km (7.6 mi)

Major junctions
- Northeast end: Highway 144
- Southwest end: numbered designation ends at Brosseau Street, unnumbered road continues to Vermilion Lake

Location
- Country: Canada
- Province: Ontario
- Major cities: Greater Sudbury (Larchwood, Hull)

Highway system
- County roads in Ontario
- Greater Sudbury Municipal Roads

Greater Sudbury Municipal Road 13, also known as Vermilion Lake Road, is a municipal road in the city of Greater Sudbury, Ontario, Canada. It was voted as the worst road in Ontario in the Canadian Automobile Association's annual Ontario's Worst Roads survey in 2007. In the 2008 survey, Vermilion Lake Road dropped to third place behind Steeles Avenue in Toronto and Brock Street in Kingston, while in 2009 the road dropped to ninth place. In 2010, however, the road rose to second place again, behind only Pelican Falls Road in Sioux Lookout.

The road begins at Highway 144, travelling in a south-westerly direction, until ending its numbered municipal road status at Brosseau Street. However, west of Brosseau Street, the Vermilion Lake Road name continues for a further 1.5 km, ending at a dead end near Vermilion Lake. The road primarily serves the communities of Larchwood and Hull.

In October 2007, shortly after the road was named to the Worst Roads survey, the city launched a construction project to replace four culverts on the road.

Greater Sudbury Road 13 only intersects with one other numbered municipal road, Greater Sudbury Road 12 (Gordon Lake Road).
