= Frood Mine =

Nickel mine in Ontario, Canada

Coordinates: 46°32′N 81°00′W

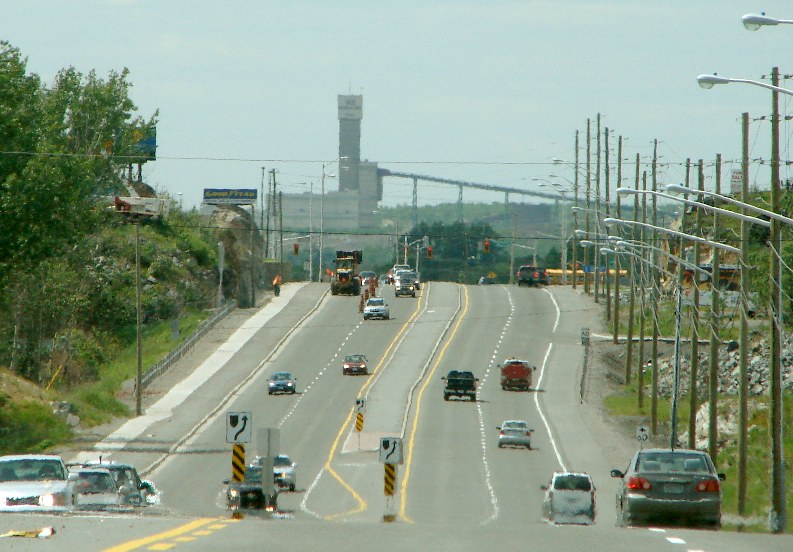
The Frood Mine as seen in the distance from the Kingsway near 3rd Avenue

Frood-Stobie Mine is a nickel mine in Greater Sudbury, Ontario, named for Thomas Frood, an employee of the federal department of Crown lands who prospected and staked many of the early mining claims in the area. A major arterial road in the city is also named for Frood.

The Frood Mine was, prior to 1 January 1929, the subject of exploitation by the International Nickel Company of Canada and the Mond Nickel Company, because they had adjoining claims to the ore body. In addition, the Mond mine had a problem with its hanging wall. It was decided between Robert C. Stanley and Alfred Mond that the synergies of corporate amalgamation were so great that they fused their respective companies into the former.

During the Second World War, the Frood Mine alone accounted for a full 40 per cent of all the nickel used in Allied artillery production. In recognition of that contribution, Elizabeth II, Queen of Canada, and her husband, Prince Philip, Duke of Edinburgh, visited Frood Mine in 1959. The Queen's parents, King George VI and Queen Elizabeth visited on June 6, 1939.

Frood Mine shared the 1989 John T. Ryan Trophy for the best occupational safety record among Canadian mines in the previous year. On June 8, 2011, however, two miners were killed at Stobie Mine when they were struck by a run of muck at an ore pass on the mine's 900-metre level (3000 ft level). The Ontario Ministry of Labour fined Vale Limited $1,050,000 under the Occupational Health and Safety Act after Vale pleaded guilty to three counts related to mine safety.

Vale Limited announced in 2012 that production at the mine would be suspended at the year's end.

== See also ==
- List of mines in Ontario
