= Onaping Falls =

Coordinates: 46.6°N 81.4°W

- Dissolved municipality (lower-tier)
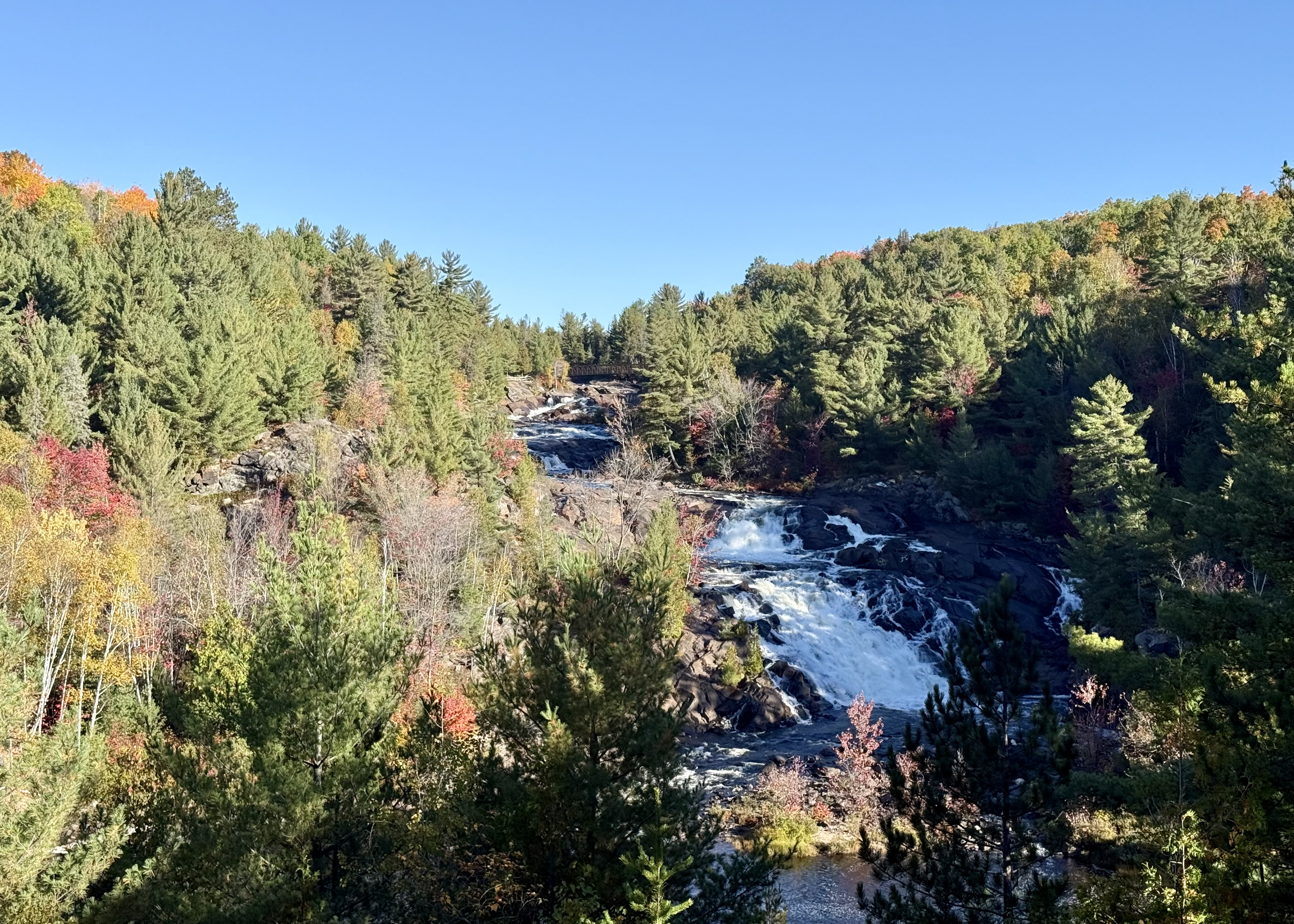
- Onaping Falls from the A.Y. Jackson Lookout

- Location of Onaping Falls (red) compared to the rest of the Sudbury Region until 2000.
- Country: Canada
- Province: Ontario
- City: Greater Sudbury
- Ward: 3
- Incorporated: January 1, 1973
- Dissolved: December 31, 2000

Government
  - Governing Body: Greater Sudbury City Council
  - MPs: Jim Belanger (Conservative)
  - MPPs: France Gélinas (NDP)

Population (2011)Statistics Canada
  - Total: 4,874
- Population is for Census Tract 5800140.00
- Time zone: UTC-5 (EST)
  - Summer (DST): UTC-4 (EDT)
- Postal Code FSA: P0M
- Area code: 705
- Website: Onaping Falls Community Action Network

Onaping Falls (1996 census population 5,277) was a town in the Canadian province of Ontario, which existed from 1973 to 2000. It was created as part of the Regional Municipality of Sudbury, and took its name from the waterfalls (High Falls) on the Onaping River.

On January 1, 2001, the town and the Regional Municipality were dissolved and amalgamated into the city of Greater Sudbury. The town is now part of Ward 3 on Greater Sudbury City Council.

In the Canada 2011 Census, the main communities in Onaping Falls were listed for the first time as two of six distinct population centres (or urban areas) in Greater Sudbury: Dowling (population 1,690, density 475.0 km^{2}) and Onaping-Levack (population 2,042, density 251.3 km^{2}).

== Communities ==
Onaping Falls is an amalgamation of three local communities: Dowling, Onaping, and Levack. Dowling is located 11 km from Onaping along Highway 144, while Levack is located north of the highway along Municipal Road 8. The smaller subdivisions of Levack Station and Phelans are also located along Highway 144 between Dowling and Onaping.

The area is known for its recreational abundance; fishing, hunting, snowmobiling, cross-country and downhill skiing and most other recreational sports are common activities of the residents.

It has become famous for High Falls, where the Onaping River drops 55 metres in a single plunge. The town is at the point where the Canadian Shield meets the Sudbury Nickel Irruptive, caused by a meteorite strike two billion years ago. There is a lookout off Highway 144 called the A. Y. Jackson Lookout, for the famous Group of Seven artist who memorialized the view on his canvas.

The town is also home to Windy Lake Provincial Park.

== History ==
Prior to the early 1970s, Levack and Onaping were company towns with no direct municipal government. Dowling was part of Dowling Township, which was already incorporated as a municipality.

With the advent of regional government in 1973, the town of Onaping Falls became a part of the Regional Municipality of Sudbury, which also included the towns of Rayside-Balfour, Nickel Centre, Walden, Valley East and Capreol. The name "Onaping Falls" was chosen electorally between three contentious names: "Mountainvale" submitted by Levack resident Mary Carol McLellan, "Onaping Falls", submitted by Onaping resident Ted Cunningham and "Dowling", submitted by Dowling council. Mr. Cunningham received $25 for submitting the chosen name.

On November 9, 1973, Onaping Falls was the site of a truck - train collision which caused more than a 1,000 gallon spill at the New Cobden Road crossing off Highway 144 about 2 miles northwest of Dowling. Traces of PCB's were found in the water table four years after the crash.

The first mayor of Onaping Falls was Jim Coady, for whom the ice arena in Levack is named. Other mayors of Onaping Falls between 1973 and absorption into the City of Greater Sudbury were Bob Parker, Shirley Mirka and Jean Guy "Chummy" Quesnel.

== Politics ==
Onaping Falls is currently part of Ward 3 on Greater Sudbury City Council, along with much of the former town of Rayside-Balfour. A Community Solutions team was established in April 2006 to deal with challenges to the amalgamation of the former towns into one City of Greater Sudbury. The Community Solutions Team was made up with representatives from across the new city (Jack Oatway, Marc Tasse, Martha Cunningham Closs, Keir Kitchen, Barry Brett, France Belanger-Houle, Gisele Chretien) and chaired by Floyd Laughren. The final report called the Constellation City listed many improvements to Greater Sudbury's municipal governance The committee visited and spoke to citizens in several corners of the city and all former towns. The report completed in 2007, recommended the former Onaping Falls be reconstituted as its own ward on city council, although this has not occurred to date.

== Notable people ==
Notable people from the Onaping Falls area include Olympian Joe Derochie (Canoe, 1960 Rome), National Hockey League players Dave Taylor (Los Angeles Kings), Dave Hannan (Pittsburgh Penguins) and Troy Mallette (Ottawa Senators), Olympic cyclist Eric Wohlberg, Paralympian (rowing) Steven Daniel and author Mark Leslie (Lefebvre). Recording artist and singer/songwriter Kevin Closs has made his home in Onaping Falls since 1990.

== Name origin ==
Onaping may be a corruption of the Anishinaabemowin word onamaning. Onaman means red ochre and the locative suffix "ing" transforms the word into "place of the red ochre". Onaping lies on the ridge of the Sudbury basin, an area rich in iron-bearing minerals.

== Images ==
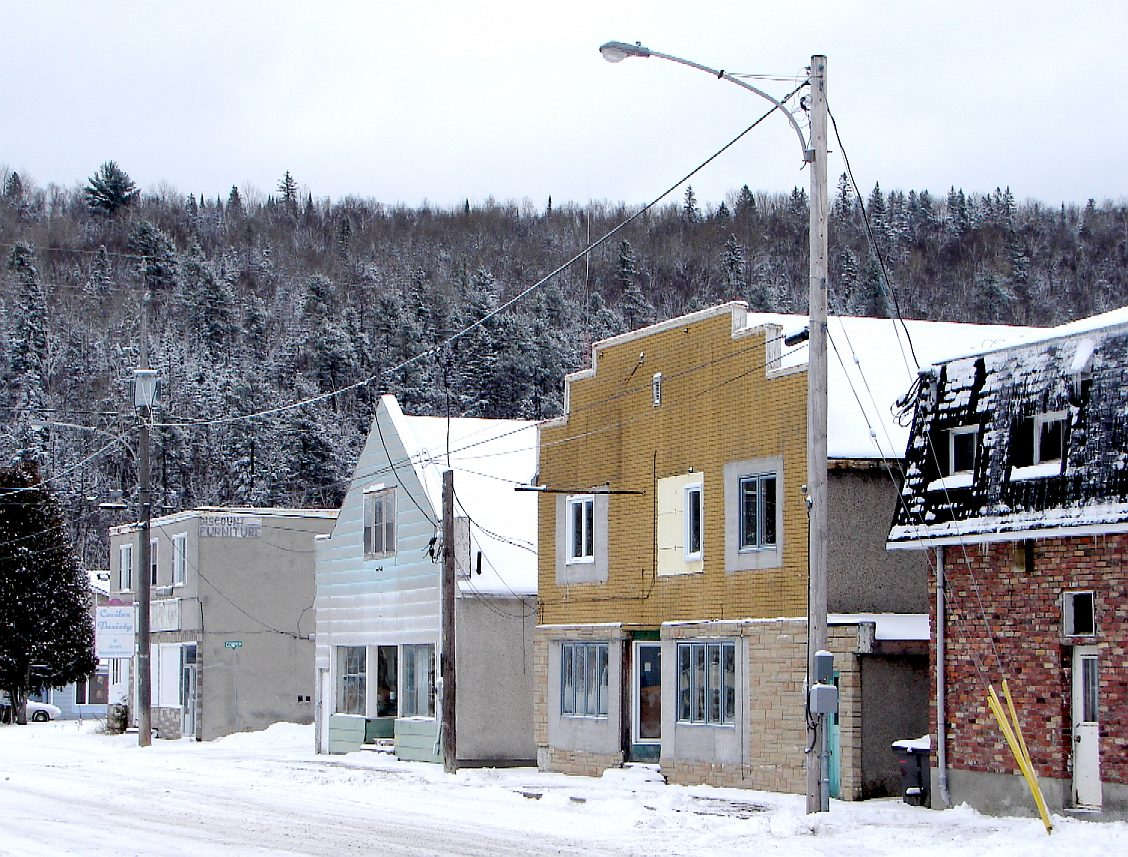
Levack

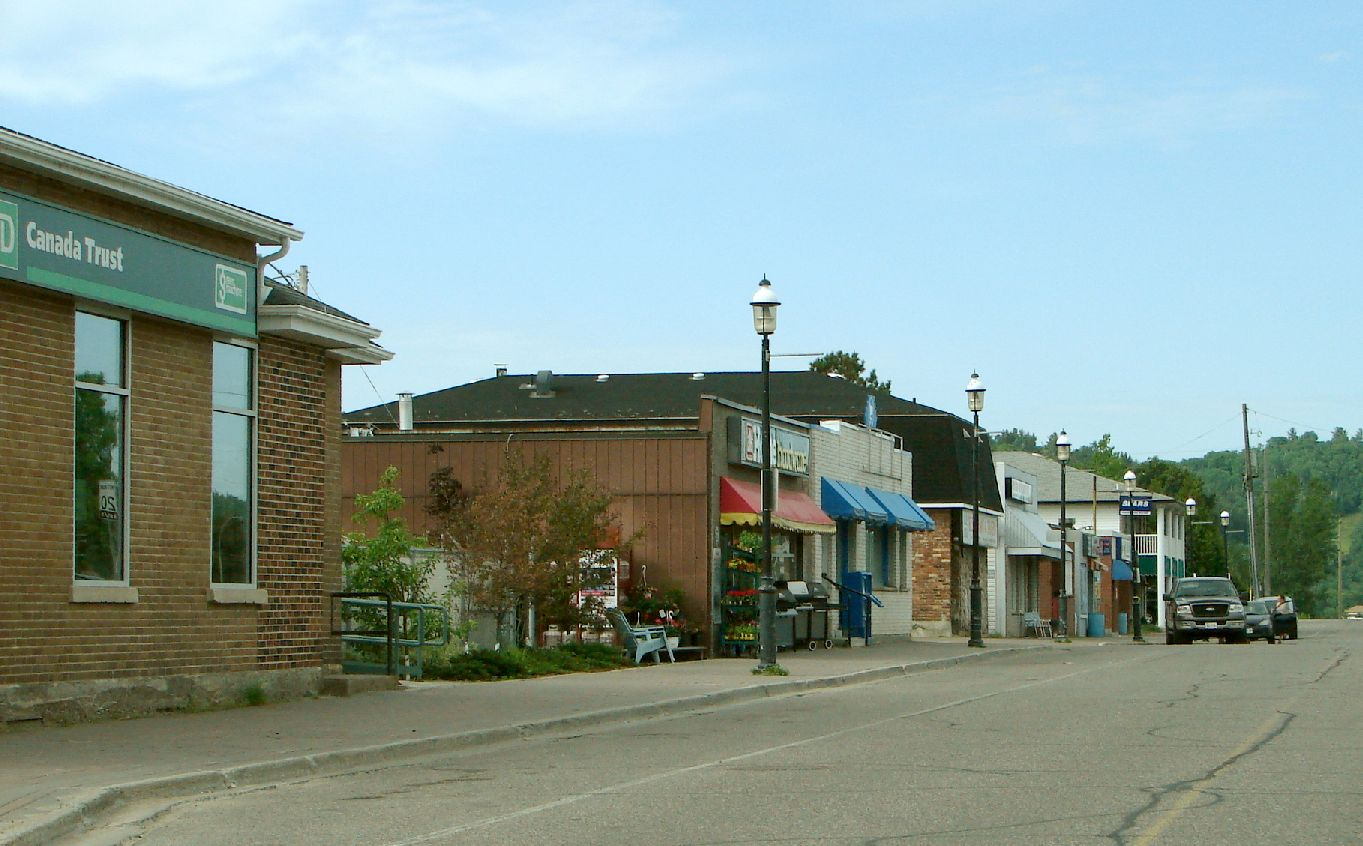
Levack

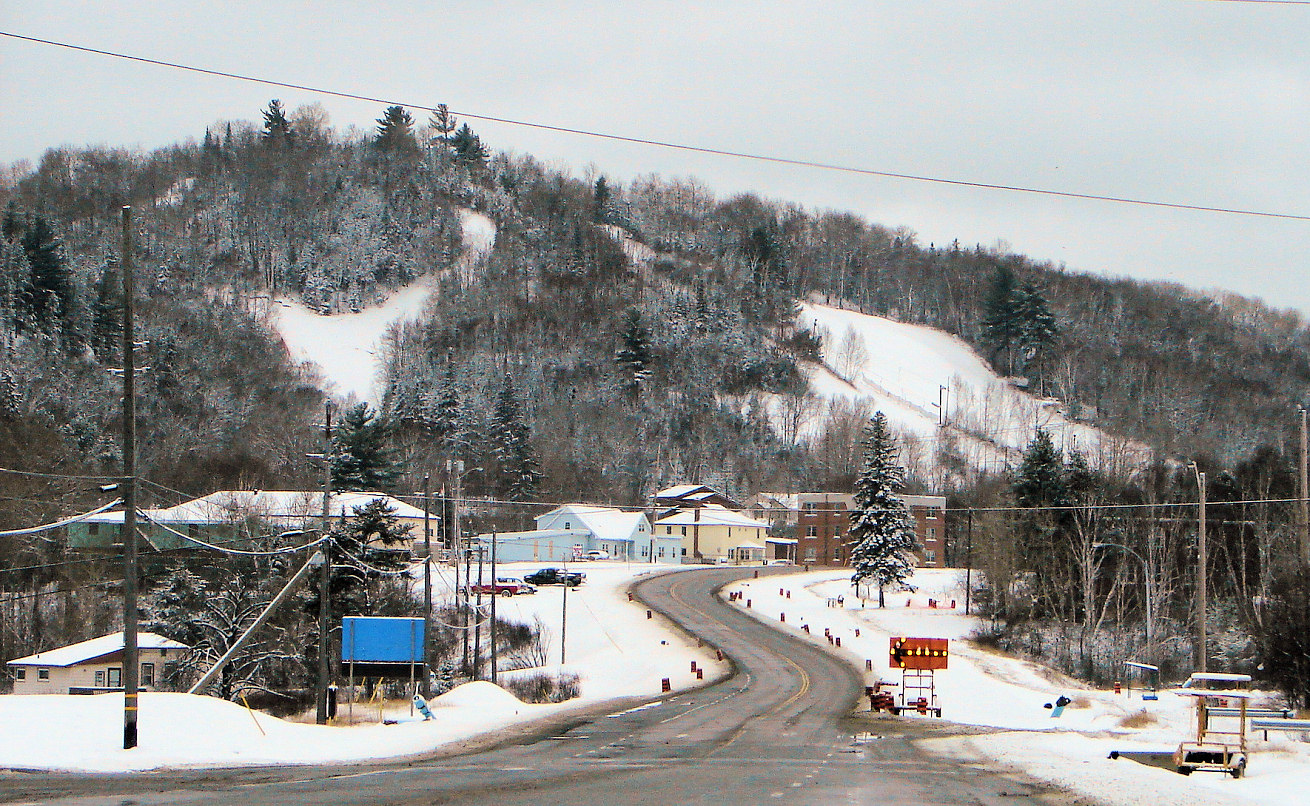
Onaping and the Onaping Ski Hill
