= Ontario Highway 144 =

Ontario provincial highway

Highway 144
- Highway 144 highlighted in red

Route information
- Maintained by the Ministry of Transportation of Ontario
- Length: 271.7 km (168.8 mi)
- History: Assumed April 1965 completed September 25, 1970

Major junctions
- South end: Highway 17 in Sudbury
- Highway 560 / Sultan Industrial Road; Highway 661 – Gogama
- North end: Highway 101 in Timmins

Location
- Country: Canada
- Province: Ontario

Highway system
- Ontario provincial highways; Current; Former; 400-series
← Highway 141	→ Highway 148

King's Highway 144, commonly referred to as Highway 144, is a provincially maintained highway in the northern portion of the Canadian province of Ontario, linking the cities of Greater Sudbury and Timmins. The highway is one of the most isolated in Ontario, passing through forest for the majority of its 271 km (168 mi) length. It is patrolled by the Ontario Provincial Police and features an 80 km/h (50 mph) speed limit.

Highway 144 was created by renumbering Highway 544 in April 1965. This was done in preparation for an extension of the short secondary highway from Cartier to Timmins, and was completed in 1970. In the mid-1980s, a new route was constructed which allowed Highway 144 to bypass the urban core of Sudbury, known as the Northwest Bypass.

== Route description ==
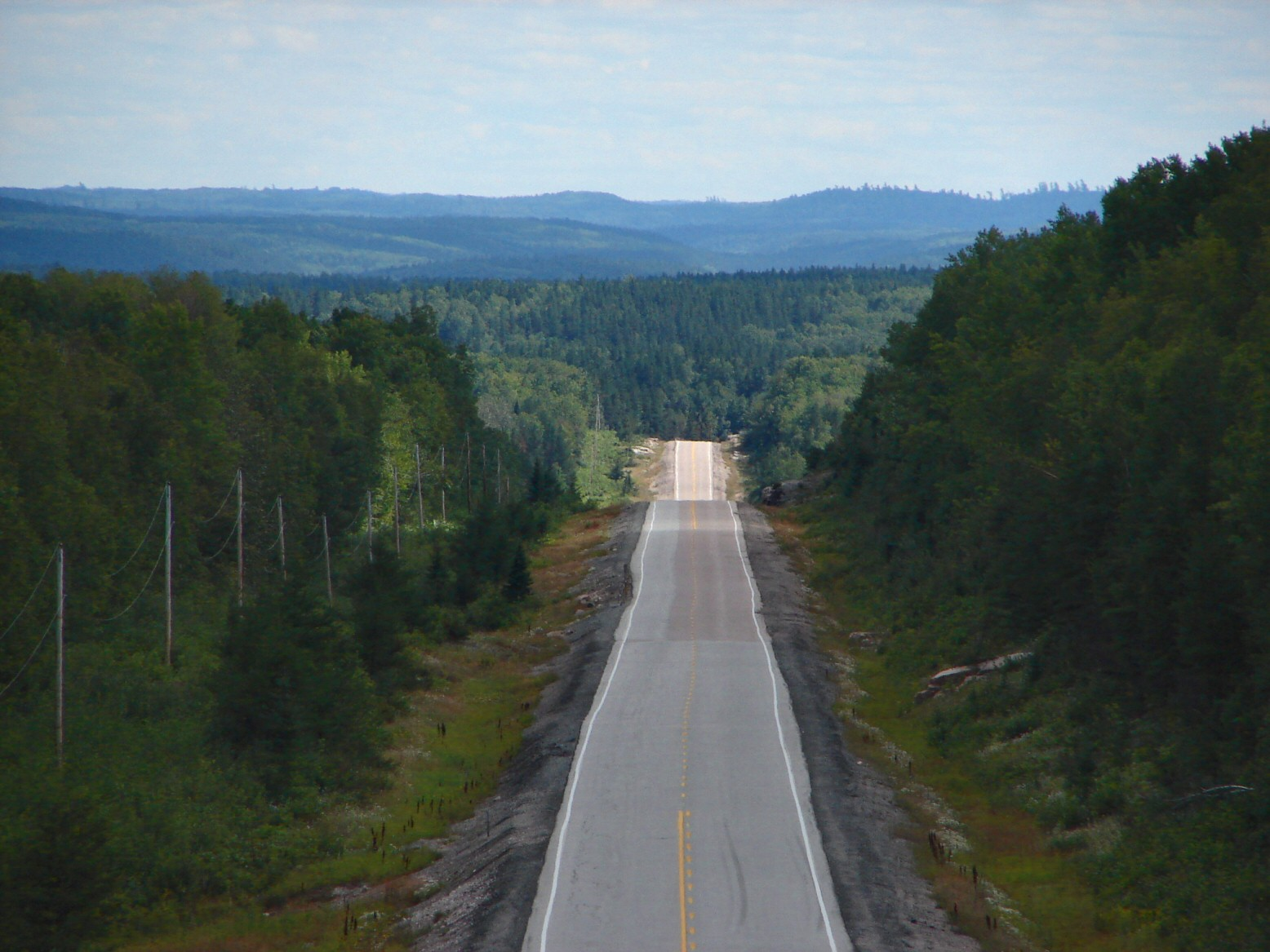
Highway 144 north of Gogama

Highway 144 is 271 km (168 mi) long, lying between its southern terminus at an interchange with Highway 17 west of Lively and its northern terminus at an intersection with Highway 101 west of downtown Timmins. Much of the route is isolated; Cartier is the only community located directly on the highway anywhere north of Sudbury's northerly city limits, although Gogama and the Mattagami First Nation are near the highway along spur routes.

Between the communities of Dowling and Onaping in Greater Sudbury, Highway 144 is home to the scenic A. Y. Jackson Lookout, overlooking the waterfall depicted in Jackson's 1953 painting "Spring on the Onaping River". It exits Greater Sudbury at Windy Lake Provincial Park and passes through the village of Cartier, then enters a long isolated stretch surrounded by boreal forest. At an isolated point 149 km (93 mi) north of Lively and 117 km (73 mi) south of Timmins, Highway 144 meets Highway 560 and the Sultan Industrial Road, which constitute the only major transportation route intersecting the highway outside the cities of Sudbury and Timmins; the rest stop at this intersection is the only gas station located on the highway north of Cartier.

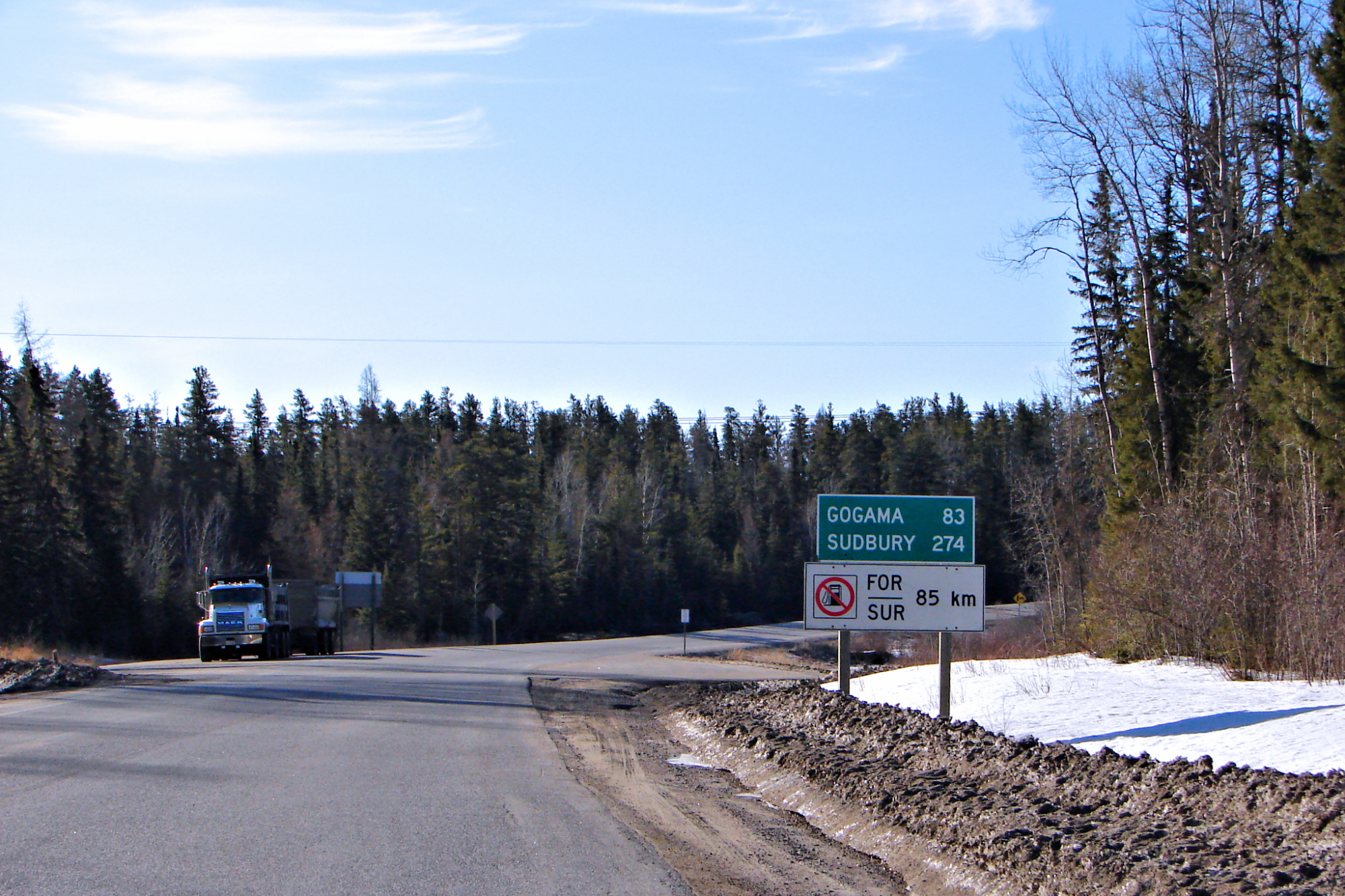
Northern terminus of Highway 144 at Highway 101. No fuel for 85 km.

Just north of the Highway 560/Sultan Industrial Road intersection, the highway crosses the Laurentian Divide, the boundary between the Great Lakes and Arctic Ocean watersheds. North of this point, all streams and rivers flow north into Hudson Bay. A sign and a small picnic area mark the transition. The highway continues through isolated forests and curves east to meet Highway 661, a short spur serving the town of Gogama. The highway turns to the north and follows along the western side of Kenogamissi Lake for 70 km (43 mi) to its terminus at Highway 101, just west of the urban core of Timmins and some 79 km (49 mi) east of Foleyet.

== History ==
Prior to 1964, Highway 144 was numbered as Highway 544 and extended from Sudbury to Cartier. Construction began in that year on a new route connecting Sudbury to Timmins, with work commencing at both ends as well as from Gogama. The highway number was changed in April 1965; the upgrade from secondary to primary highway reflected the proposed route's importance in linking two major urban centres. Despite this, the portion of the route of Highway 544 between Windy Lake and Cartier was bypassed by a new alignment; the old route is still known as Old Highway 544 or Old Cartier Road. The new highway was fully opened to traffic by premier John Robarts on September 25, 1970.

Until some point between 1974 and 1977, Highway 144 passed through the INCO mine property north of Copper Cliff and entered Sudbury along Spruce Street and Regent Street. Realignments between Sudbury and Azilda resulted in a shorter routing that is today known as Sudbury Municipal Road 35. Despite this, planning was underway throughout the 1970s to construct several bypasses around Sudbury, including the Southwest Bypass of Highway 17, as well as the 17.6-kilometre (10.9 mi) Northwest Bypass between it and Chelmsford. In early 1983, contracts were tendered for the grading of the northern 8.7 km (5.4 mi) section within what was then the town of Rayside-Balfour. The project was completed by the end of the year, after which a second contract was awarded to grade a further 6 km (3.7 mi). The final grading contract, which included the interchange at Highway 17, was awarded in 1985 and completed in mid-1986. The entire bypass was paved shortly thereafter and opened in 1987.

== Future ==
In recent years, heavy traffic has been reported along the route through Chelmsford and Dowling, with an average daily traffic volume of 19,200 vehicles in 2002. The Ministry of Transportation has announced a preliminary study into potential improvements to the route between Chelmsford and Dowling, which may include the possibility of a full bypass realignment.

The City of Greater Sudbury had widened Municipal Road 35 between the eastern intersection of Municipal Road 21 (Notre Dame Street) in Azilda to Highway 144 in Chelmsford to four lanes. Construction began in the fall of 2018 with a culvert replacement contract. The completion of widening of Municipal Road 35 was expected to be completed in 2021 and was fully completed in 2022.

== Major intersections ==
The following table lists the major junctions along Highway 144, as noted by the Ministry of Transportation of Ontario.

Division	Location	km	mi	Destinations	Notes
Sudbury	Greater Sudbury	0.0	0.0	Highway 17 / TCH – Sault Ste. Marie, North Bay	Interchange; southern terminus
Sudbury	Greater Sudbury	4.0	2.5	Municipal Road 24 south (Main Street) – Creighton Mine, Lively	
Sudbury	Greater Sudbury	17.6	10.9	Municipal Road 15 north – Val Caron Municipal Road 35 south (Old Highway 144) – Azilda	May be bypassed in the future by a realignment currently under MTO study.
Sudbury	Greater Sudbury	18.7	11.6	Municipal Road 14 north (Errington Avenue)	May be bypassed in the future by a realignment currently under MTO study.
Sudbury	Greater Sudbury	24.1	15.0	Municipal Road 13 south (Vermilion Lake Road)	May be bypassed in the future by a realignment currently under MTO study.
Sudbury	Greater Sudbury	27.3	17.0	Municipal Road 12 south (Gordon Lake Road)	May be bypassed in the future by a realignment currently under MTO study.
Sudbury	Greater Sudbury	28.2	17.5	Larchwood Avenue – Onaping Falls	
Sudbury	Greater Sudbury	40.9	25.4	Municipal Road 8 north – Onaping Falls	
Sudbury	Unorganized Sudbury	73.9	45.9	Onaping Lake Road – Onaping Lake Provincial Park	
Sudbury	Unorganized Sudbury	154.0	95.7	Highway 560 east / Sultan Industrial Road	
Sudbury	Unorganized Sudbury	186.0	115.6	Highway 661 south – Gogama, Mattagami	
Timiskaming	No major junctions				
Cochrane	Timmins	271.7	168.8	Highway 101 – Timmins, Wawa	Northern terminus
1.000 mi = 1.609 km; 1.000 km = 0.621 mi
