= List of neighbourhoods in Sudbury =

The current city of Greater Sudbury, Ontario was created after the 2001 amalgamation of the Regional Municipality of Sudbury, which was established in 1973. Along with the original City of Sudbury, the former municipalities include Capreol, Nickel Centre, Onaping Falls, Rayside-Balfour, Valley East, and Walden.

The name ‘Sudbury’ can refer to Greater Sudbury in its entirety, or the area of the former City of Sudbury prior to 2001. The following is a list of neighbourhoods of the former city prior to 2001 except for the community of Copper Cliff, a former town that was annexed by the City of Sudbury in 1973.

== The Donovan ==
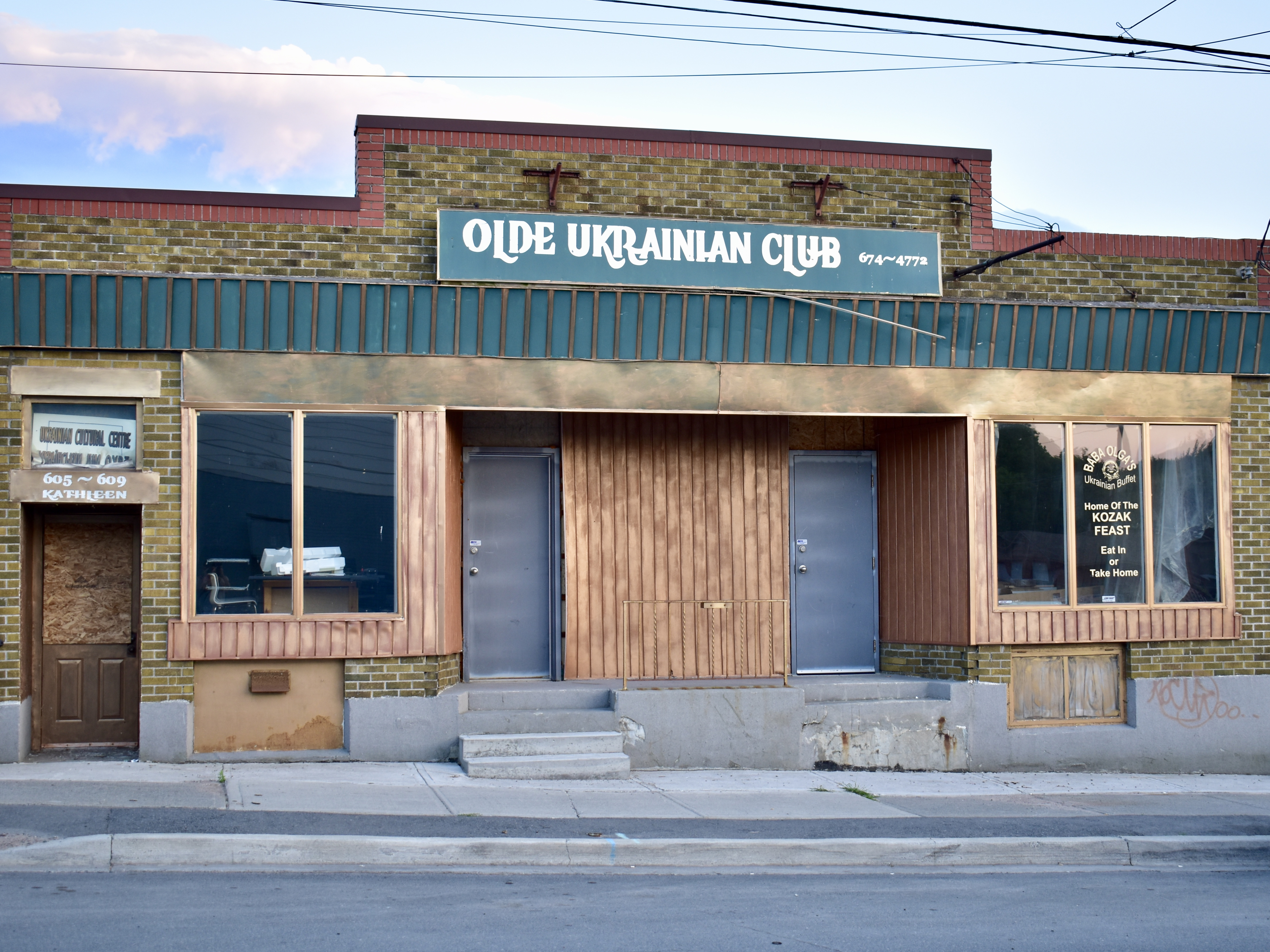
Olde Ukrainian Club in The Donovan.

The Donovan neighbourhood is centered on Frood Road northwest of downtown and was established in 1907. The Donovan refers to the area immediately surrounding the intersection of Frood, Kathleen, and Beatty north of Elm Street. The name of the neighbourhood comes from Donovan Street, which was named after farmer Timothy Donovan.

The neighbourhood was established by immigrants from Eastern, Central, and Southern Europe, including Germans, Ukrainians, Poles, Serbs, Croats, and Hungarians, as well as Finns and Swedes. Cultural and religious organizations established here include the Sts. Peter and Paul Serbian Orthodox Church, the Olde Ukrainian Club, and the Sudbury Ukrainian Co-Op.

== Downtown ==
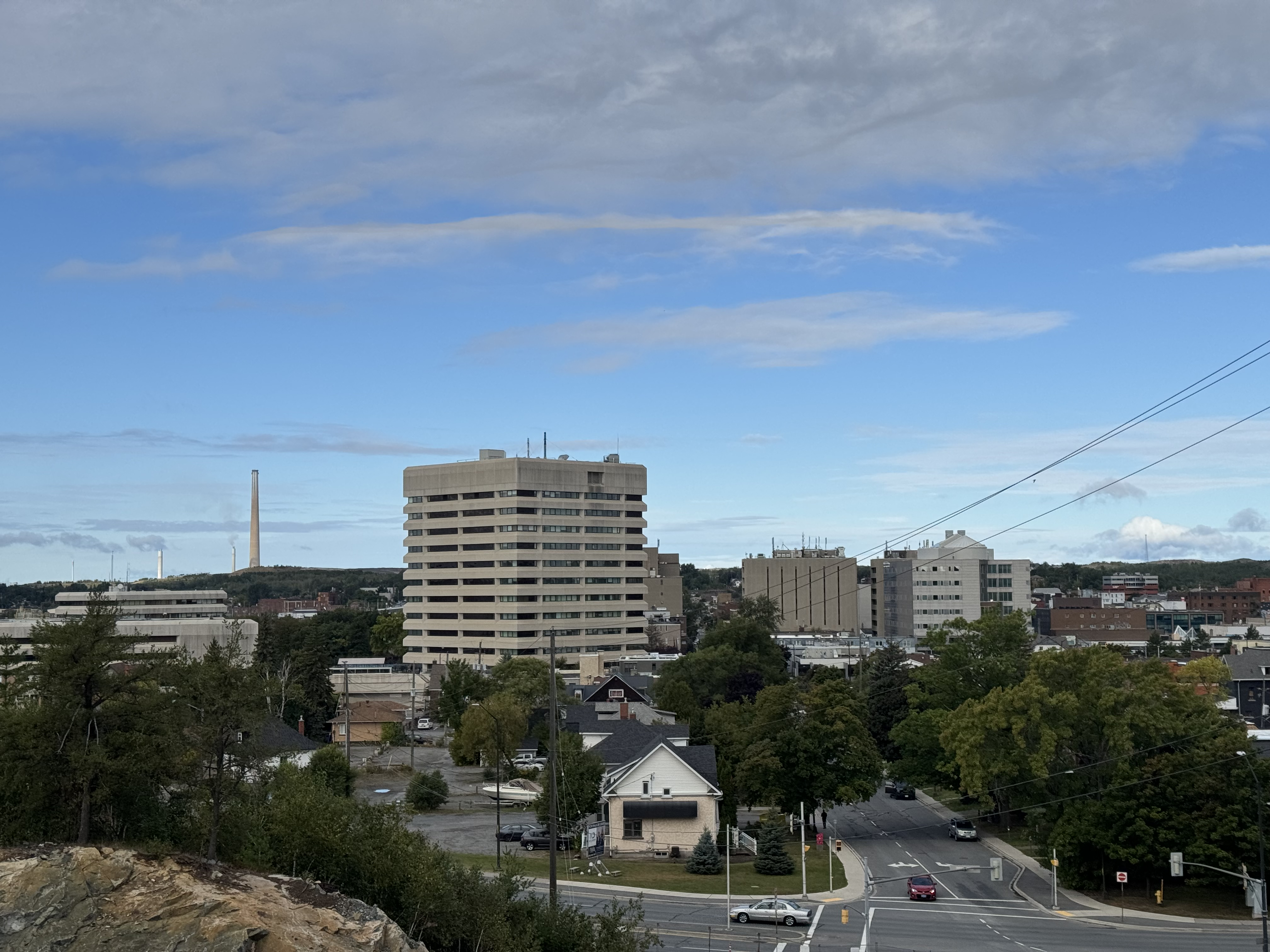
Downtown Sudbury.

Downtown Sudbury is the oldest neighbourhood in Sudbury, tracing its roots to the establishment of the Jesuit mission of Sainte-Anne-des Pins in 1883. Downtown is bounded by Ste Anne Road and Evergreen Street to the north, Alder Street to the west, Kitchener Avenue to the east, and the CPKC yard to the south and southwest.

The historical centre of Sudbury is located downtown at the intersection of Elm and Elgin, where the Town of Sudbury was incorporated on January 16, 1893, at McCormick's Hall. The former Borgia Street neighbourhood was demolished in the late 1960s as an urban renewal project. Ste Anne Road, public housing projects, and the City Centre shopping mall were constructed in its place. The City Centre mall was later renamed to the Rainbow Centre, and once again to Elm Place in 2020.

Greater Sudbury City Hall is located at Tom Davies Square, and the 12-storey building at 199 Larch Street within Tom Davies Square is the tallest building in Sudbury. Two buildings in Downtown Sudbury are designated heritage sites on the Canadian Register of Historic Places, the Canadian Pacific Railway station built in 1907, and the Government of Canada Building on Lisgar Street built in 1957.

A new multipurpose event centre at the corner of Minto and Brady Streets to replace the 1951 Sudbury Community Arena building is expected to be completed by the end of 2028.

== Flour Mill ==
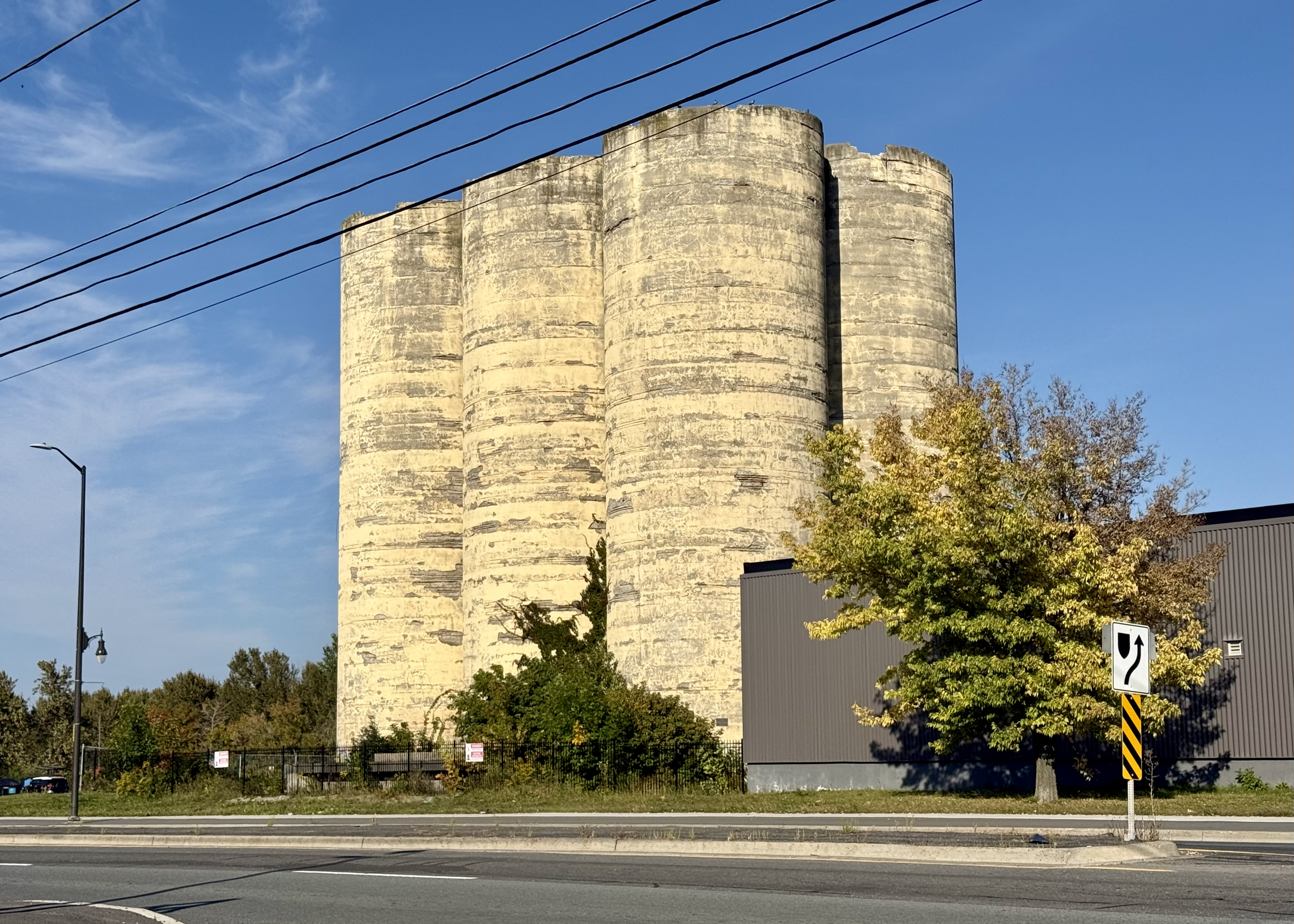
The Flour Mill Silos in 2025.

The Flour Mill (French: Moulin-à-Fleur) neighbourhood is centred on Notre-Dame Avenue and Kathleen Street north of downtown Sudbury, from Jogues Street to Wilma Street. The French name for the neighbourhood, Moulin-à-Fleur, comes from the French term "Fleur de Farine". The working-class neighbourhood was traditionally the centre of the Franco-Ontarian community in Sudbury.

The neighbourhood was named for the Manitoba and Ontario Flour Mill, which was constructed in 1910. The mill, except for the silos, was demolished in 1920. The silos were designated as a heritage site in 1990. Other buildings include Église St-Jean-de-Brébeuf, the Flour Mill Museum, and École catholique Sacré-Coeur.

The neighbourhood experienced frequent spring flooding from runoff into Junction Creek prior to the 1960s when floodplain management measures were implemented. After a flood in 2009, planning for a flood mitigation project along Junction Creek began the following year, with construction beginning in 2025.

A community improvement plan was launched in 2006 with the support of the Flour Mill Business Improvement Association, which involved planting trees along Notre-Dame and installing benches, community banners, and a splashpad in O'Connor Park. In 2019, the Flour Mill Museum was relocated from its location on St. Charles Street to O’Connor Park to allow for upgrades to the St. Charles lift station.

== Gatchell ==
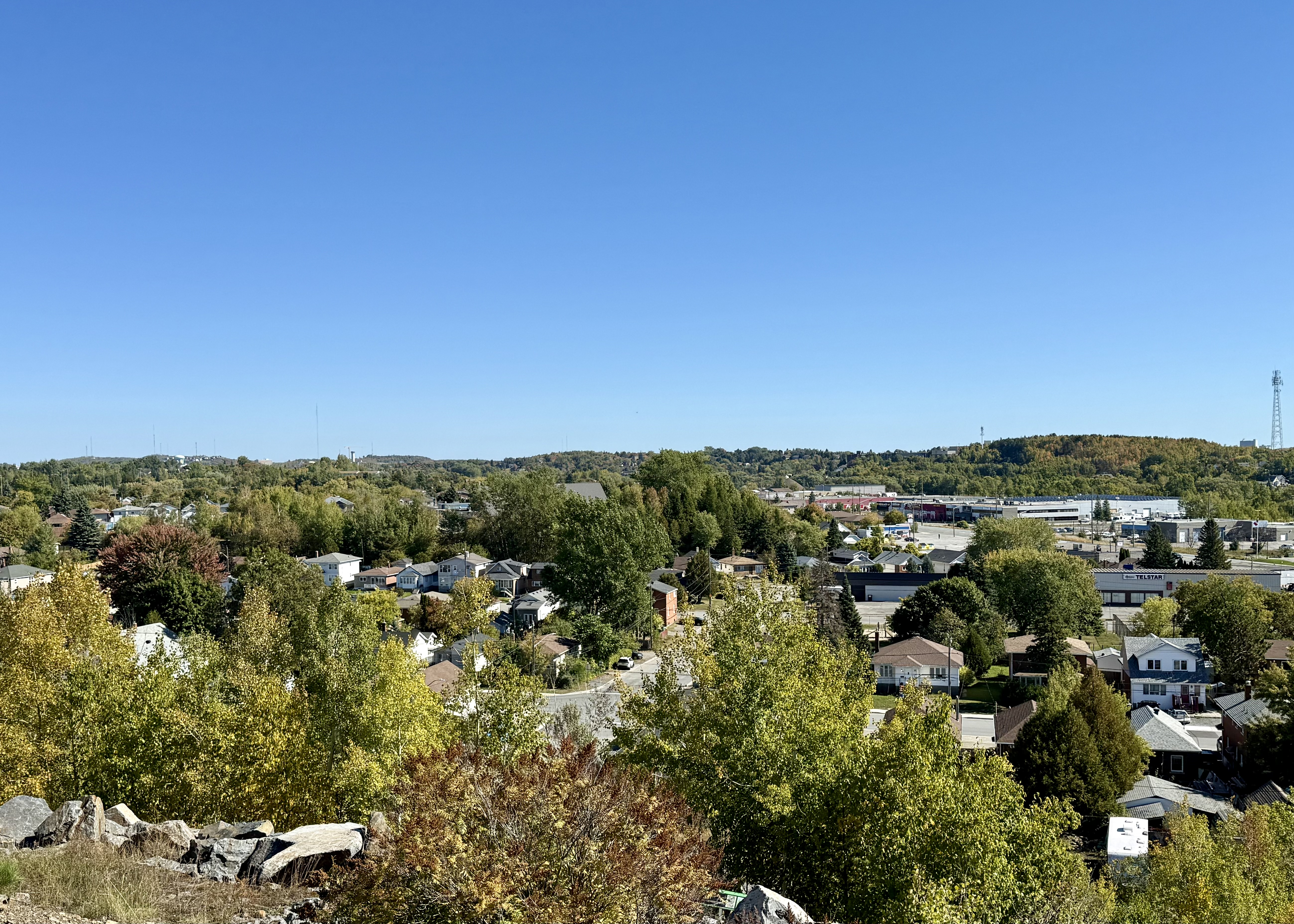
The Gatchell Neighbourhood.

Gatchell is located to the southwest of downtown, between the West End and the eastern edge of Copper Cliff along Lorne Street southwestward from Byng Street to Big Nickel Mine Drive, with Big Nickel Mine Drive serving as its northern border. The neighbourhood is named after Moses Gatchell, a dairy farmer who owned land in the area. Many streets in the neighbourhood are named after locals who were killed in action during the First World War.

The neighbourhood was established by working-class Italian immigrants, who founded the St. Anthony Church and Delki Dozzi Park, named after local Italian Canadian politician Delchi Dozzi. The homes in the neighbourhood date mostly to the 1920s through 1940s. The main landmark of the neighbourhood is Dynamic Earth and the Big Nickel, located at its western edge.

== Kingsmount-Bell Park ==
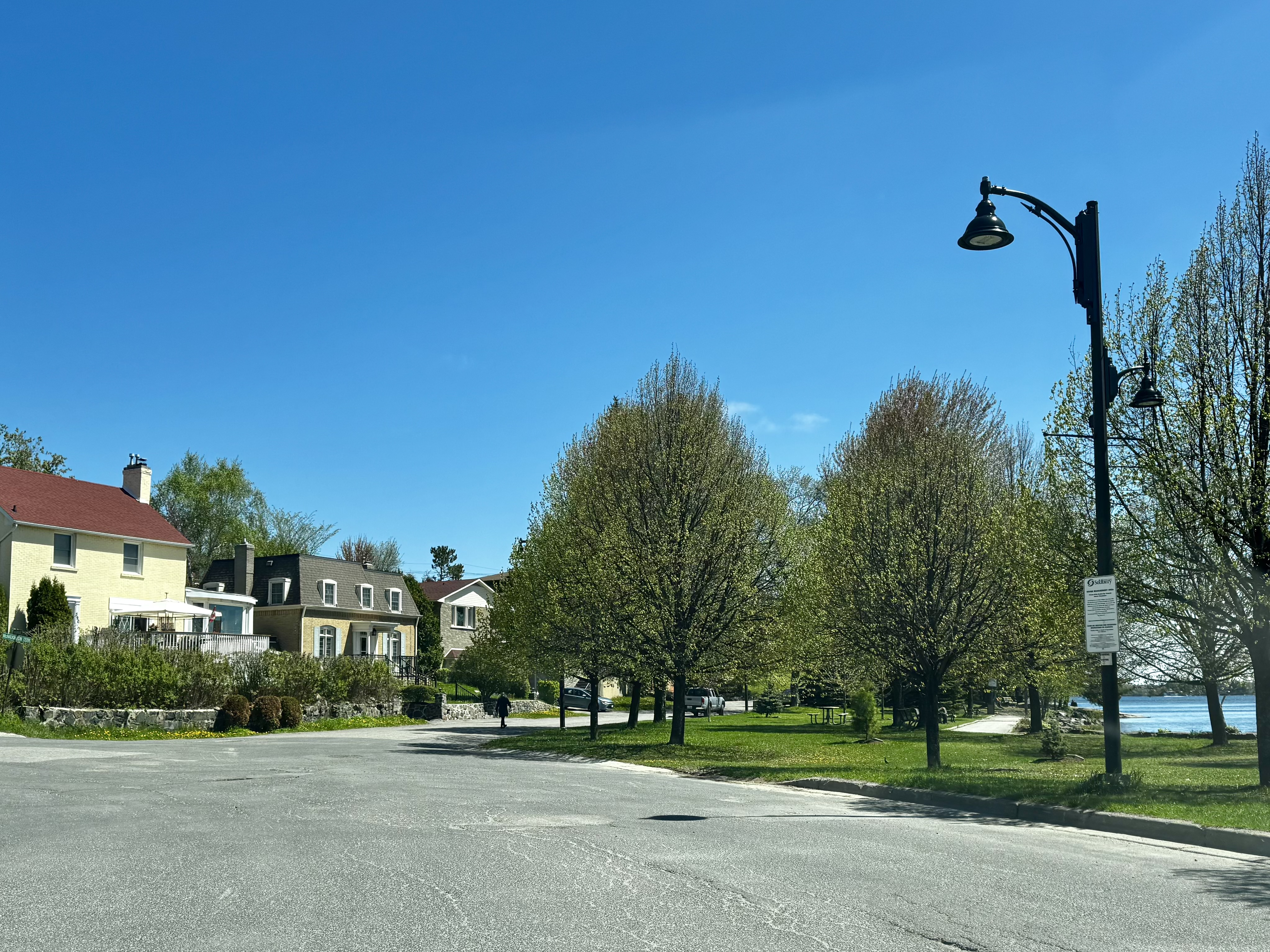
McNaughton Terrace and Ramsey Lake.

The Kingsmount-Bell Park neighbourhood is centred on John and Paris Streets, and runs north to Worthington Crescent, south to Science North at Ramsey Lake Road, west to Regent Street and eastward along Ramsey Lake. It is one of the oldest neighbourhoods in the city with homes dating from the late 1800s to the 1940s.

Bell Park, one of the largest parks in the city, is the main landmark of the neighbourhood. The park was named for William and Katherine Bell, who donated a 110-acre tract of land to the Town of Sudbury in 1926 to expand a park on Ramsey Lake in exchange for the closure of streets around their estate on John Street. Their estate, Belrock Mansion, is a designated heritage site and was home to the Art Gallery of Sudbury from 1967 until 2025.

Other historic buildings in this area include the John Street Waterworks, the former residence of the President of Laurentian University, and the former residence of the Grey Nuns. Along with Ramsey Lake and Bell Park. Landmarks of the neighbourhood include Science North, the Sudbury Yacht Club, Idylwylde Golf & Country Club, Health Sciences North, and Laurentian University.

== Minnow Lake ==
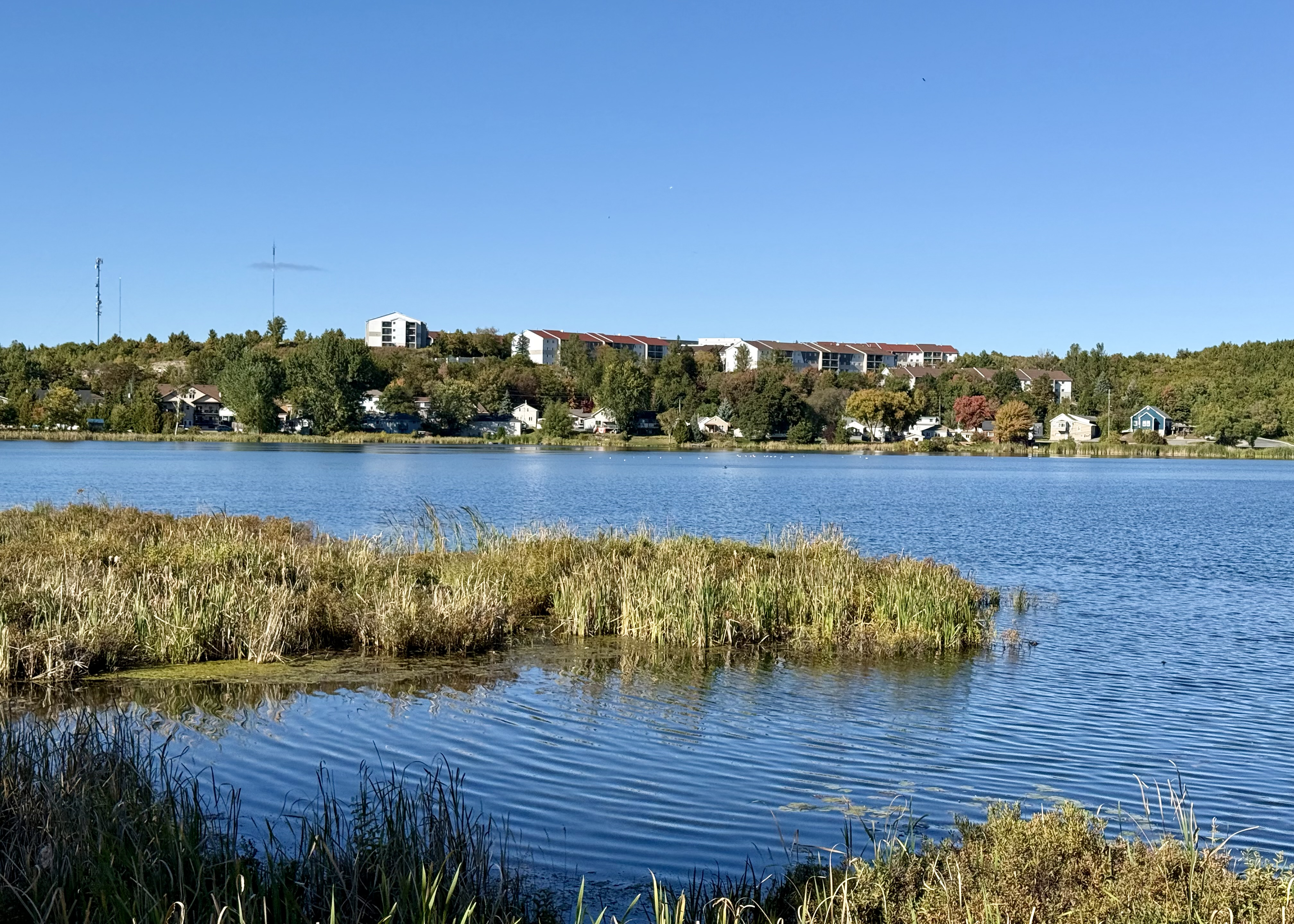
Minnow Lake.

The Minnow Lake neighbourhood is located south of the Kingsway from Bancroft Drive eastward to Moonlight Avenue from the north and follows the north shore of Ramsey Lake along Howey Drive, Bellevue Avenue and Bancroft to Moonlight from the south.

Minnow Lake itself is located west of the intersection of Bellevue and Bancroft. The lake was named Black Lake in the 1880s, and a sawmill was constructed at what is now the end of Downing Street in 1883, which closed in the 1910s.

All of what is now the Minnow Lake neighbourhood was owned by Nicholas Julian Frederic du Caillaud prior to his death in 1919. The two islands of Minnow Lake, Du Caillaud and Romanet, were named after him. William and Maurerite Barry later purchased much of the land, and many of the streets were named after their seven children and thirty foster children.

In July 2000, the Millennium Fountain was installed in the lake by the Minnow Lake Restoration Group. The boardwalk along the lake was replaced in 2024 due to seasonal flooding.

Landmarks in the neighbourhood include the Sudbury Curling Club, Carmichael Arena and skateboard park, Civic Memorial Cemetery, and Branch 76 of the Royal Canadian Legion which has an M4 Sherman tank on display.

== New Sudbury ==
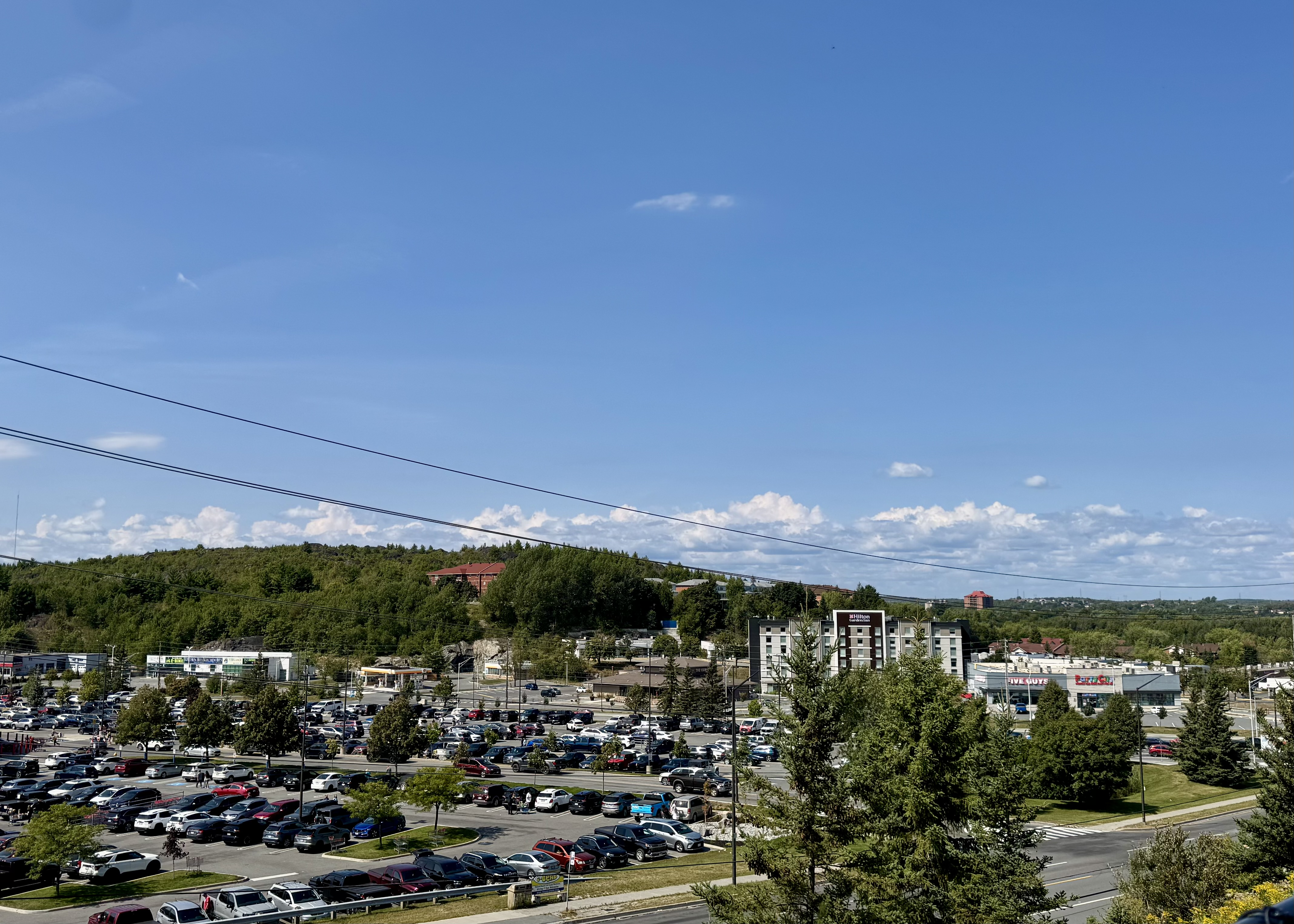
Barry Downe and Lasalle.

New Sudbury (French: Nouveau-Sudbury) is centred along the east-west Lasalle Boulevard and the north-south Barry Downe Road, and is bordered by Maley Drive to the North, Notre Dame Avenue to the west, Falconbridge Road to the east, and the Kingsway to the south.

The neighbourhood was settled as a farming community and is now primarily commercial and suburban. The New Sudbury Centre, at the intersection of Lasalle and Barry Downe, is one of the largest shopping malls in northern Ontario. The Sudbury Tax Centre of the Canada Revenue Agency, located at the intersection of Lasalle and Notre Dame, is one of the largest employers in Greater Sudbury. At the eastern end of Lasalle Boulevard is Sudbury Junction VIA Station.

== South End ==
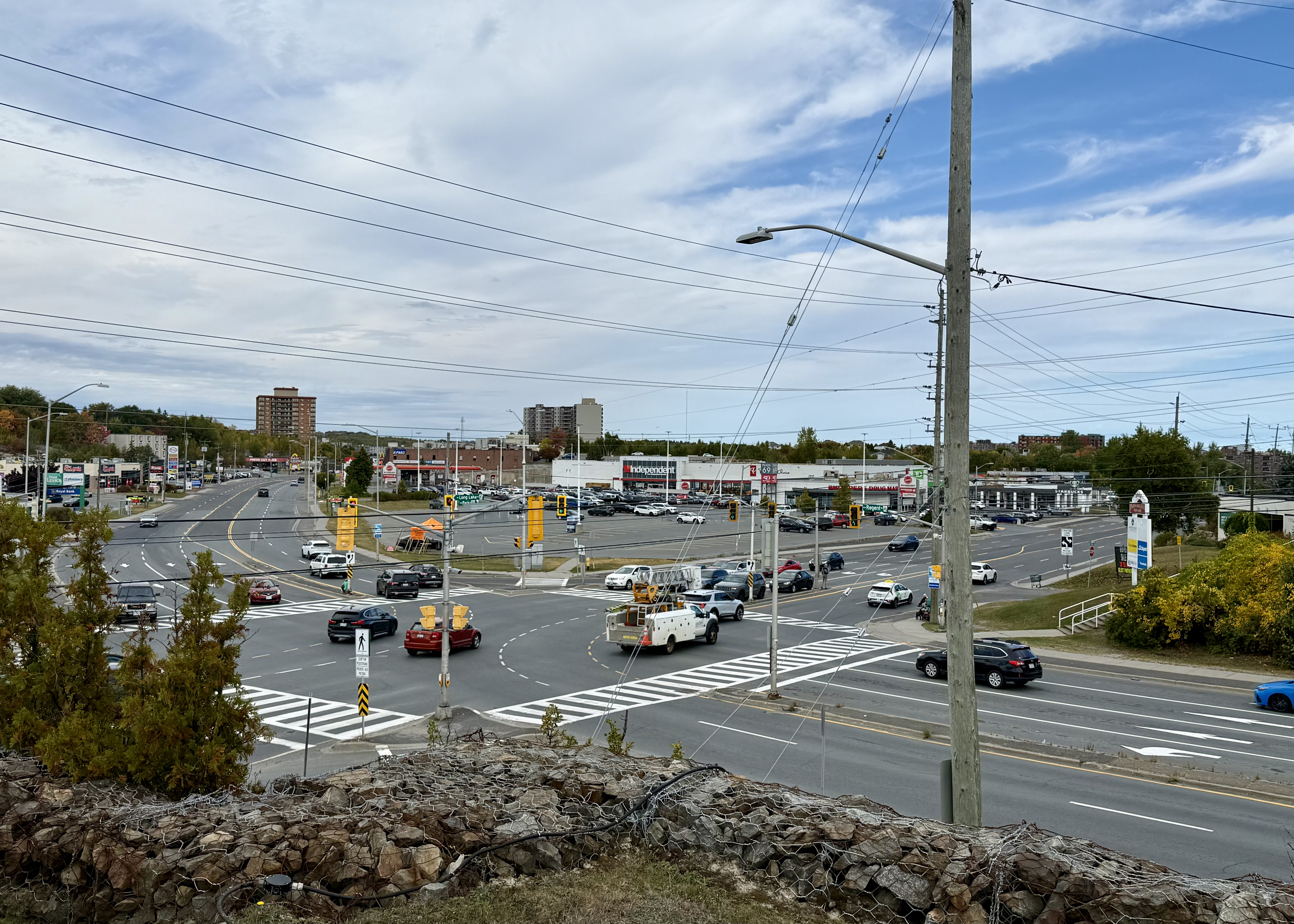
The Four Corners Area.

The South End neighbourhood is centred on the intersection of Regent Street, Paris Street and Long Lake Road. The northern edge of the neighbourhood is Walford Road, with Nepahwin Lake to its east, Kelly Lake to its west. Highway 17, a main route of the Trans-Canada Highway, passes through the South End along the Southeast and Southwest Bypasses.

The Four Corners area of the South End is a commercial district at the intersection of Regent Street, Paris Street and Long Lake Road, with the Southridge Mall sitting on the southeast corner of the intersection, and the Sudbury SmartCentre located south of the intersection on Long Lake Road.

The Lo-Ellen neighbourhood, surrounding Lo-Ellen Park Secondary School, and the Lockerby neighbourhood, surrounding Lockerby Composite School, are also located in South End along with the smaller McFarlane Lake and Long Lake areas.

== Uptown ==
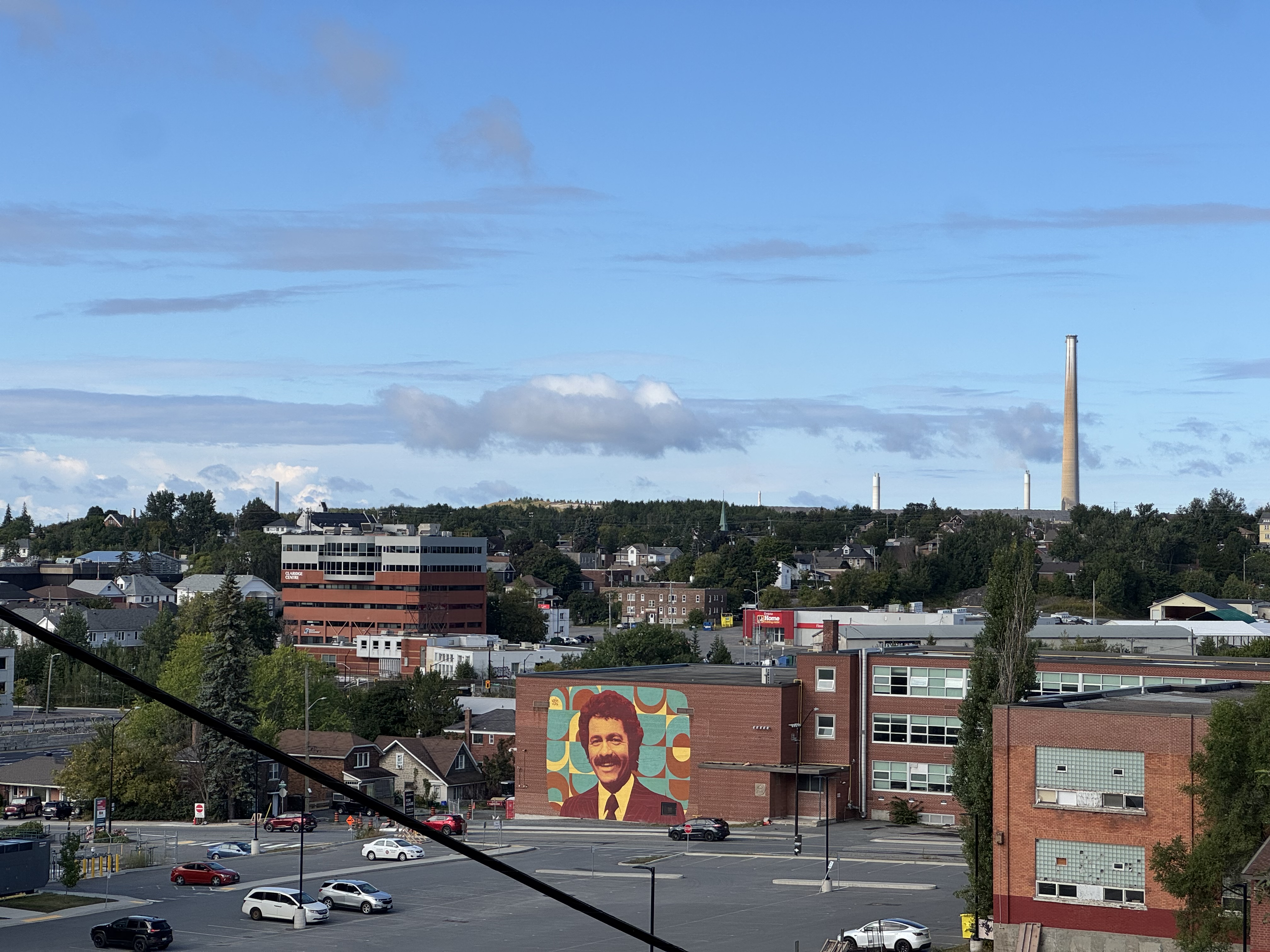
Mackenzie Street.

Uptown (French: Haute-Ville) is located immediately north of downtown along Ste Anne Road and Frood Road, bordering the Donovan to the south of Kathleen Street. Uptown is mostly residential in character, with cultural, educational, and religious institutions such as Lansdowne Public School, Sudbury Secondary School, the Sudbury branch of the Ukrainian National Federation, the Ukrainian Greek Orthodox Church of St. Volodymyr, and the main branch of the Greater Sudbury Public Library.

The neighbourhood is one of the oldest in Sudbury, with buildings of historical significance including the designated École Saint-Louis-de-Gonzague building, as well as a portion of the former St. Josephs Hospital building, reconstructed as part of the Red Oak Villa seniors residence.

== West End ==
The West End is located to the west of downtown. Its northern border follows Elm Street westward from Regent Street to Big Nickel Mine Drive, and its eastern border follows Regent Street southward to Lorne Street and follows Lorne southwestward to Byng Street.

Like the adjacent Gatchell neighbourhood, the West End was traditionally Italian Canadian in character. The neighbourhood is primarily residential, with commercial activities along Regent Street and Lorne Street. Queen's Athletic Field on Cypress Street is municipally listed heritage site. Other landmarks include the former Sudbury Brewing and Malting Co. building on Lorne Street, the Societa Caruso Club, Park Lawn Cemetery and the Anglican Cemetery.
