= List of Disney attractions that were never built =

This is a list of publicly known Disney attractions that were never built; that is, rides, shows, and other Disney park attractions which never reached the final building stage. Some of them were fully designed and not built, often due to budget cuts. Others were concepts, sometimes with preliminary artwork. Some ideas were later reused in other attractions.

== Theme parks ==
Name	Development years	Description	Reference
Walt Disney's Riverfront Square	1963–1965	A planned theme park in St. Louis, Missouri, which would have been the second Disney park after Disneyland.	
DisneySea	1990–1991	An oceanic theme park designed to be a part of Port Disney.	
WestCOT	1991–1995	A planned Disneyland clone of Walt Disney World's Epcot.	
Disney-MGM Studios Europe	1992–1995	The original planned second theme park for Disneyland Paris, which evolved into Walt Disney Studios Park	
Disney's America	1993–1994, 1997	A patriotic park to be located in Haymarket, Virginia. The Walt Disney Company also planned to re-theme Knott's Berry Farm in Buena Park, California.	

== Properties ==
Name	Description	Reference
Mineral King Ski Resort	A Disneyland-like ski resort in the Mineral King area of California. See "Disney Ski Resort proposal, and addition to national park" section under Mineral King entry.	
National Harbor resort hotel	A 500-room hotel to be located in National Harbor, Maryland, intended as a national convention center and visitor area. Disney purchased 11 acres for the hotel for $11 million in May 2009, but cancelled the project in November 2011.	

== Resorts ==
=== Disneyland ===
Name	Description	Reference
Disneyland Resort Hotel	A luxurious, 800-room complex that was to be constructed in the style of Coronado, California's Hotel del Coronado. It was inspired by Disney's Grand Floridian Resort & Spa in Walt Disney World.	

=== Walt Disney World ===
Name	Description	Reference
Disney's Asian Resort	A Thai-themed resort to be located where Disney's Grand Floridian Resort & Spa is today.	
Disney's Venetian Resort	An Italian-themed resort to be located between the Contemporary Resort and the Transportation and Ticket Center.	
Disney's Persian Resort	An Iranian-themed resort to be located on Bay Lake north of the Contemporary Resort.	
Disney's Mediterranean Resort	A Greek-themed resort to be located on the Seven Seas Lagoon.	
Disney's Pop Century Resort, Legendary Years section	The partially-constructed second half of the Pop Century Resort was abandoned following a drop in tourism due to the September 11 terrorist attacks. The Legendary Years section would have been themed to the 1900s through the 1940s. The completed structures and the land that Legendary Years would have occupied were instead turned into Disney's Art of Animation Resort.	

== Resort attractions ==
Name	Description	Reference
Adventure House	A walkthrough at Disney's Fort Wilderness Resort & Campground that would have ended with a children's playground.	

== Theme park lands ==
=== Disneyland ===
Name	Development Years	Description	Reference
Lilliputian Land	1953–1955	Intended to be located north of Tomorrowland and east of Fantasyland, Lilliputian Land would have been constructed on a greatly reduced scale of the fictional island from Guliver’s Travels.	
Mythica	Unknown	A land inspired by Greek and Roman myths and legends.	
Tomorrowland 2055	1993–1994	A planned update and makeover of Tomorrowland with an emphasis on extraterrestrial themes, abandoned due to budget cuts after the failure of Disneyland Paris.	
"Big Town USA"	1976–1984	A New York-themed area where Mickey's Toontown now sits, which would have featured a big Broadway-style theater with daily live shows. This idea became the inspiration for the American Waterfront at Tokyo DisneySea.	
Edison Square	1955–1960	An electricity-themed land, modeled after a newly-electrified city from the 1900s, planned for construction in the current location of the Plaza Inn and Space Mountain.	
Hollywood Land	1996	A land with a 1930s-1940s theme, featuring rides adapted from the Dick Tracy and Who Framed Roger Rabbit films. A similar concept was later used for the Disney California Adventure, and Roger Rabbit's Car Toon Spin rides can be found in Mickey's Toontown at Disneyland and Tokyo Disneyland.	
Discovery Bay	late 1970s	Discovery Bay was designed as a tribute to Jules Verne and H.G. Wells. Elements of the plans were later used at Disneyland Paris and Tokyo DisneySea.	
Land of Legends	late 1970s	A land dedicated to American folklore, featuring attractions based on The Legend of Sleepy Hollow and The Ballad of Windwagon Smith; a Paul Bunyan restaurant; and Western River Expedition.	
Liberty Street	1955–1965	A land modeled after Philadelphia in 1776, featuring a small harbor. Was to have its entrance off Main Street to the left of the Disneyland Opera House. A similar land named Liberty Square was later built at the Magic Kingdom in Florida.	
Dumbo's Circus Land	Unknown	A sub-area of Fantasyland where Dumbo the Flying Elephant and the Casey Jr. Circus Train would have been relocated. The idea eventually inspired the Storybook Circus subarea of the Fantasyland expansion at the Magic Kingdom.	

=== Walt Disney World ===
==== Magic Kingdom ====
Name	Description	Reference
A Birthday Surprise for Princess Aurora	Guests would craft birthday cards for Aurora at the cottage of her childhood home in a meet and greet attraction that was to be located in Fantasyland.	
Dreams Come True with Cinderella	Guests would greet Cinderella at her stepmother's manor in Fantasyland where they would learn how to dance like a royal or protect the kingdom like a knight.	
Pixie Hollow	Guests would enter the world of the Tinker Bell film series.	
Western River Expedition	An area of the park themed after the Western Expansion of the United States. It was to be located in Frontierland, where Tiana’s Bayou Adventure (previously known as Splash Mountain) and where Big Thunder Mountain (in construction) currently sits.	

==== Epcot ====
Name	Description	Reference
Costa Rica Pavilion	A Costa Rican-themed area, featuring a large greenhouse filled with tropical plants and birds.	
Equatorial Africa Pavilion	An area themed after the countries of Equatorial Africa, featuring a 60-foot treehouse and a live show called "Heartbeat of Africa".	
Iran Pavilion	An Iranian-themed area, proposed during the planning of Epcot, featuring a dark ride exploring different parts of Persian history and a shopping area based on a bazaar. Scrapped after the Iranian Revolution.	
Israel Pavilion	An Israeli-themed area, advertised on billboards when Epcot opened, designed to recreate ancient Jerusalem and featuring a courtyard stage and open-air restaurant. Remained unbuilt due to budget problems and security issues.	
Puerto Rico Pavilion	A Puerto Rican-themed area which may have been planned for the projected "Phase II" expansion of Epcot.	
Soviet Union Pavilion	A Russian-themed area planned for the projected "Phase II" expansion of Epcot. It would have been based on the Moscow Kremlin, and dominated by a replica of St. Basil's Cathedral. Scrapped after the dissolution of the Soviet Union.	
Spain Pavilion	A Spanish-themed area advertised on billboards circa 1986, with a design blending elements of Barcelona and Madrid, featuring a boat ride, a film on Spanish history, and a restaurant.	
Switzerland Pavilion	A Swiss-themed area, intended to bring a Matterhorn Bobsleds-style ride to Epcot.	
United Arab Emirates Pavilion	A Middle Eastern-themed area, with a magic carpet ride attraction and a show featuring cultural and scientific achievements of the Middle East.	
Venezuela Pavilion	A Venezuelan-themed area, featuring a waterfall, a high-rise built into a cliff, and an aerial tram ride.	

==== Disney's Hollywood Studios ====
Name	Development Years	Description	Reference
Mickey's Movieland	Late 1980s	A replica of Disney's original Hyperion Avenue Studio, with hands-on exhibits demonstrating classic movie production. Guests would be able to create Foley sound effects, or spin projectors to see classic Mickey drawings animated. Elements of this land were used in The Magic of Disney Animation and The Monster Sound Show, which later evolved into Sounds Dangerous!.	
Muppet Studios	1989–1991	A miniland in the Streets of America area dedicated to the Muppets. Only Muppet*Vision 3D was completed before plans were put on hold after the death of Muppets creator Jim Henson in 1990. Was to feature another attraction, The Great Muppet Movie Ride, and two restaurants: The Swedish Chef's Video Cooking School and The Great Gonzo's Pandemonium Pizza Parlor.	
Roger Rabbit's Hollywood	1989–1992	An extension of Sunset Boulevard based on the 1988 film Who Framed Roger Rabbit, featuring a recreation of Maroon Studios located where Rock 'n' Roller Coaster Starring Aerosmith is today, and three attractions: Toontown Trolley, Baby Herman's Runaway Baby Buggy, and Benny the Cab. Put on hold due to a legal dispute between Disney and Amblin Entertainment. The planned Red Car Trolley was built in Disney California Adventure, and Benny the Cab was adapted into Roger Rabbit's Car Toon Spin.	

==== Disney's Animal Kingdom ====
Name	Development Years	Description	Reference
Beastly Kingdom	1998–2011	A "myths and legends"-themed land planned for Disney's Animal Kingdom. It was replaced by Camp Minnie-Mickey due to budget cuts after the failure of Disneyland Paris. Much of the land designated for use by Beastly Kingdom is now used for Pandora – The World of Avatar.	

=== Hong Kong Disneyland ===
Name	Description	Reference
Frontierland	A Wild West-themed land, combining features of Disneyland Paris' Frontierland and Disney California Adventure's Grizzly Peak. Planned to have been in the park on opening day.	
Toon Town	A much more advanced version than Toon Towns in other Disney parks, featuring a roller coaster, an animatronic show, and character houses and meet-and-greets. May have inspired Toon Studio at Walt Disney Studios Park.	
Glacier Bay	An ice-themed land intended to go behind Adventureland and next to Mystic Point; replaced by Toy Story Land.	
Pirate's Land	A pirate-themed land.	

== Attractions ==
=== Disneyland ===
Name	Description	Reference
Indiana Jones and the Lost Expedition	A huge complex housing the Indiana Jones Adventure, a minecart roller coaster, and part of the Jungle Cruise, with the Disneyland Railroad traveling through the middle.	
The Museum of the Weird	An attraction-within-an-attraction at the beginning of The Haunted Mansion. Suggested and named by Walt Disney after a sleepless night, it was intended to use various of Imagineer Rolly Crump's ideas, such as a chair that stood up and talked. Cancelled when The Haunted Mansion attraction was changed from a walk-through to a ride-through attraction. Several of the Museum of the Weird's designs were incorporated into the final Haunted Mansion, including the wallpaper in the "corridor of doors" scene.	
The Enchanted Snow Palace	A dark ride that was planned for Fantasyland at Disneyland, with Marc Davis instrumental in its design. Extensive surviving concept art shows a boat ride on a river of melting ice, past naturalistic scenes of Arctic wildlife, beneath a display of the Northern Lights, and into the realm of the Snow Queen, a fantastical land populated by frost fairies and snow giants. Later became inspiration for the Frozen Ever After ride in the Norway Pavilion in World Showcase at Epcot.	
Geyser Mountain	A Frontierland drop tower, in which guests riding in a huge drilling machine would be caught in a massive geyser and thrown into the air.	
Fireworks Factory	A Discovery Bay shooter ride, in which guests would travel through a fireworks factory, shooting at skyrockets, pinwheels, and other fireworks. A much smaller version was placed in Mickey's Toontown.	
Lightkeepers	A nighttime pageant planned for "Tomorrowland 2055", featuring a race of aliens from a far-off mythical galaxy who had created light, and intended as a possible Main Street Electrical Parade replacement. Eventually inspired the short-lived Light Magic nighttime parade.	
Duck Bumps	A Fantasyland bumper boats ride, to be built against International Street alongside the lagoon.	
Circus Hot Air Balloons	Would have bordered Discovery Bay and Dumbo's Storybook Circus.	
Dumbo's Circus	A nutty adventure underneath the big top with Dumbo leading the way.	
Mickey's Madhouse	A funhouse adventure featuring clowns and such.	
Lafitte Island	A retooling of Tom Sawyer Island based around pirate Jean Lafitte. Guests would enter Lafitte's crypt in a graveyard across from the Haunted Mansion and travel through a catacomb themed tunnel under the river to the island, which would also feature shipwrecks and Lafitte's treasure vault. Became inspiration for the Pirate's Lair rework.	
Critter Country 500	A soapbox-derby-themed proposed replacement for the Country Bear Jamboree, rejected in favor of The Many Adventures of Winnie the Pooh.	
Paparazzi Pursuit	A near-clone of the Rock 'n' Roller Coaster, placing guests in the seats of actors trying to make the premiere of their newest hit film at the Chinese Theatre while dodging paparazzi and freeway traffic. Reworked at the insistence of Michael Eisner after the death of Princess Diana under similar circumstances. The final Superstar Limo, a much slower dark ride featuring celebrity caricatures and entertainment industry inside jokes, was hated by both park guests and Imagineers, ultimately closing less than a year after it opened.	
Untitled DuckTales attraction	In 2020, a ride based on the 2017 reboot of The Disney Afternoon series DuckTales was put in development at Walt Disney Imagineering with the intention of being a replacement for Roger Rabbit's Car Toon Spin at Mickey's Toontown. The ride's plot would have featured Donald Duck breaking Gyro Gearloose's time machine and being sent trought multiple periods of history, guests would be taken by Huey, Dewey, Louie and Webby Vanderquack on a mission of saving Donald and rewritting history. The attraction would be scrapped due the financial cuts that Imagineering and The Walt Disney Company faced during the COVID-19 pandemic however the Mickey's Toontown refurbishment which opened in 2023 rebranded Donald's Boat as a DuckTales attraction instead.	

=== Walt Disney World ===
==== Disney's Animal Kingdom ====
Name	Description	Reference
Dragon Tower	A dragon-themed roller coaster planned for Beastly Kingdom. Laid-off Imagineers took the idea to Universal, where it became Dueling Dragons (Dragon Challenge).	
Quest for the Unicorn	A hedge maze planned for Beastly Kingdom. Laid-off Imagineers took the idea to Universal, where it became The Flying Unicorn.	
Fantasia Gardens	A boat ride designed for Beastly Kingdom featuring the mythical animals in Fantasia. The current Fantasia Gardens is a miniature golf course located near the Walt Disney World Swan and Dolphin resorts.	
The Excavator	A wooden runaway mine car roller coaster through an abandoned dinosaur dig, planned for DinoLand USA but replaced by Primeval Whirl due to budget cuts.	

==== Disney's Hollywood Studios ====
Name	Description	Reference
Baby Herman's Runaway Baby Buggy	A Fantasyland-style dark ride based on Who Framed Roger Rabbit, in which guests would play the role of Baby Herman's stunt double, riding in giant baby carriages through the scenes of the cartoon Tummy Trouble, bouncing over hospital beds and whizzing around the wards of St. Nowhere Hospital.	
Benny the Cab Ride	A dark ride based on Who Framed Roger Rabbit, which eventually became Roger Rabbit's Car Toon Spin at Disneyland and Tokyo Disneyland.	
Dick Tracy's Crime Stoppers	An enhanced motion vehicle ride through the streets of Chicago, based on the 1990 film Dick Tracy.	
The Great Muppet Movie Ride	A Muppet-style "misguided" tour through movie history, intended as part of Disney's planned Muppet Studios.	
Toontown Trolley	A madcap flight simulator in which animated screens take guests on a "hare-raising" trolley ride through a zany cartoon world with Roger Rabbit at the helm.	
Creatures' Choice Awards	A comedic animatronics show taking the form of an Awards Show for classic movie monsters, hosted by Eddie Murphy (as "Eddie Frankenmurphy") and featuring Elvira, Mistress of the Dark as one of the presenters. The main subplot of the show would follow Godzilla, the guest of honor and recipient of a Lifetime Achievement Award, on his journey from Japan to Walt Disney World, where he would literally bring down the house in the finale.	
Villain Ride	A possible replacement for The Great Movie Ride, in which three-dimensional recreations of Disney's most famous fiends would menace the guests until the forces of good finally came to their rescue.	

==== Epcot ====
Name	Description	Reference
Simulated Bullet Train Ride	A unique variation on Disney's CircleVision 360 show. Guests would have found themselves standing aboard a vibrating recreation of the passenger compartment of a Japanese bullet train. Looking out through the oversized faux windows in this passenger car, they would have been treated to a high-speed travelogue as some of Japan's most beautiful scenery whizzed by the windows. The attraction was planned for the Japan Pavilion at Epcot.	
Bobsled Ride	A roller coaster, similar to Disneyland's Matterhorn, planned to be built inside a mountain behind the failed Switzerland pavilion. It went through two different iterations before being scrapped.	
Time Racers	A high-tech thrill ride about fast-forwarding through history that was to replace Spaceship Earth.	
Rhine River Cruise Ride	A cruise down Germany's most famous rivers, including the Rhine, the Tauber, the Ruhr and the Isar. Detailed miniatures of famous landmarks would also be seen, including one of the Cologne Cathedral. The ride entrance and the building that would have housed it are still visible at the Germany pavilion.	
Thames River Cruise Ride	Designed as part of the UK pavilion, this full-scale water ride would visit key London landmarks. Concept art from 1986 shows the Tower of London, Victoria's Tower, and the Houses of Parliament.	

==== Magic Kingdom ====
Name	Description	Reference
Western River Expedition	A Pirates of the Caribbean-style ride through the Wild West. This was first proposed for Walt Disney's Riverfront Square. The land proposed for the ride is now used by Big Thunder Mountain Railroad.	
Fire Mountain	A ride themed after the 2001 animated movie Atlantis: The Lost Empire. Set in 1916, two years after the film, the story of the attraction would focus on Preston Whitmore seeking to make Atlantis's existence public and offer expeditions to visitors in newly developed vehicles. However, due to mishaps, the vehicles would be forced to make a detour through the lava-filled caverns of the volcano. This ride would be cancelled as a result of the underperformance of the film and the downturn in tourism after the 9/11 terror attacks.	

=== Hong Kong Disneyland ===
Name	Description	Reference
Drill Drop	The second of Disney’s three different treatments for the Geyser Mountain proposal, this version was planned as a second-phase expansion for the park’s Grizzly Gulch area, with the ride’s backstory telling the tale of a local inventor trying to use the steam trapped underneath the town as a power source. Instead of building two large lands with a full-sized Grizzly Gulch and Adventure Point areas, the second attraction and land expansion were cut from Grizzly Gulch, Adventure Point was reworked into Mystic Point and given one dark ride and a restaurant, and the land meant for the indoor Glacier Bay sub-area was given to Toy Story.	
Pirates of the Caribbean: Dead Man’s Curse	A hybrid of a traditional log flume and a boat-based dark ride in the vein of the original rides at other parks, this take on the Pirates formula featured both indoor and outdoor segments winding their way through and around the fortress of Port Royal as the Black Pearl launches its attack from the first film. The ride was planned to feature at least one large outdoor drop, many indoor drops of varying heights and steepness, and state of the art projection and special effects technology.	

=== Stand alone ===
Name	Description	Reference
DisneyQuest Philadelphia	On December 9, 1998, Disney Regional announced Philadelphia as a new location for a DisneyQuest attraction. In 2001, construction on the attraction was scrapped after the DisneyQuest in Chicago failed to make a profit.	

== Restaurants ==
=== Disney's Hollywood Studios ===
Name	Description	Reference
Copperfield Magic Underground	Based on David Copperfield, the famous stage magician. It was also considered for Downtown Disney.	
Gonzo's Pandemonium Pizza Parlor	Muppet-themed restaurant; the Great Gonzo and Rizzo the Rat's version of a pizza parlor. This concept was later retooled in 2016 when the park's Pizza Planet restaurant was converted to PizzeRizzo.	
