= West River =

West River may refer to:

== Rivers ==
Canada

- West River (Antigonish, Nova Scotia) in Antigonish County, Nova Scotia
- West River (Pictou, Nova Scotia) in Pictou County, Nova Scotia
- West River (Halifax, Nova Scotia) in Sheet Harbour, Nova Scotia
- West River (Annapolis, Nova Scotia) in Kejimkujik National Park
- West River (Ontario), in Sudbury District

China

- Xi River or West River, Guangdong
- Changle River, formerly West River, Zhejiang

United States

- West River (Connecticut)
- Mattabesset River, Connecticut, formerly known as West River
- West River (Maine)
- West River (Maryland)
- West River (Massachusetts)
- West River (New York), a river in New York
- West River (Rhode Island)
- West River (Vermont)

== Locations ==
Australia

- West River, Western Australia, a locality of the Shire of Ravensthorpe

Canada

- West River, Ontario, an unincorporated place in Sudbury District
- West River, Prince Edward Island, a community in Prince Edward Island
- West River Station, Nova Scotia, a community in Pictou County

United States

- West River (neighborhood), New Haven, Connecticut
- West River, Maryland, a town
- West River, Wyoming, a town
- West River (South Dakota), a region name

== See also ==
- Western River (disambiguation)
- River West, Chicago
