= Western River =

Western River may refer to:

- Western River (South Australia), a river on Kangaroo Island in South Australia.
  - Western River, South Australia, a locality
  - Western River Wilderness Protection Area, a protected area in South Australia
    - Western River Conservation Park, a former protected area in South Australia
- Western River Expedition, themed attraction designed for Walt Disney World in Florida, USA, but never built
- Western River Railroad, themed attraction at Tokyo Disneyland, Japan

== See also ==
- West River (disambiguation)
