= DisneySea (California) =

Former proposed theme park

- Interactive map of DisneySea
- Location: Port Disney, Long Beach, California, U.S.A.
- Coordinates: 33°44′48″N 118°11′06″W
- Status: Cancelled
- Owner: Walt Disney Parks and Resorts
- Theme: Nautical

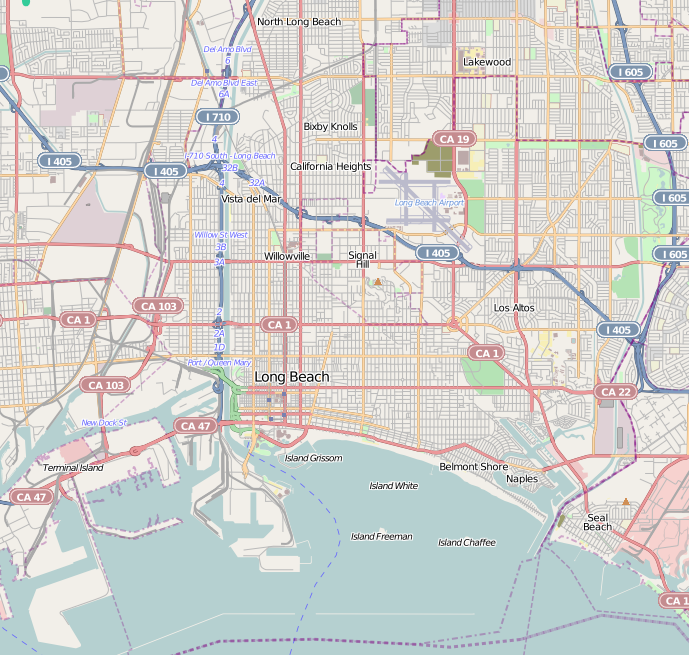
DisneySea was proposed for new fill on Queensway Bay at the mouth of the Los Angeles River.

Disney Sea was an aquatic-themed amusement park proposed by Walt Disney Parks and Resorts. Disney Sea, California was unveiled on July 31, 1990 as one part of the Disney Decade Expansion. This part of the expansion would be focused on the development of Disney Port, as part of the canceled resort complex, Port Disney, in Long Beach, California.

The theme park was met with backlash from multiple parties, including locals of the area, and was limited by prohibitions listed in the California Coastal Act. Port Disney was also speculated to be a $2.8 billion project. Because of such barriers, in December 1991, plans for DisneySea ceased.

Instead, the WestCOT plan was pursued at the site of the former Disneyland parking lot, which is now known as Disney California Adventure. Some of the concepts proposed for DisneySea were used for Tokyo DisneySea (2001).

== Proposed Features/Attractions in the Preliminary Master Plan (1990) ==
=== Oceana ===
The plans for DisneySea included a two-story aquarium in the center of the park. The designers had plans to make the feature interactive and educational for guests. The design of Oceana, a large spherical structure, was designed to be the main feature of the park.

==== Future Research Center ====
The aquarium, Oceana, was to include interactive exhibits and a working laboratory. This was similar to The Living Seas pavilion and The Land pavilion at Walt Disney World's Epcot. It was advertised in the park's Preliminary Master Plan (1990) and has been created for educational purposes.

=== Aquatic-Themed 'Lands' ===
==== Mysterious Island ====
Mysterious Island was one of the themed lands built around the idea of the lost City of Atlantis. It would have featured a Pirate Island and Nemo's Lava Cruiser attractions and rides. A revised version of Mysterious Island, including the planned volcano, was eventually built at Tokyo DisneySea.

==== Heroes' Harbor ====
Heroes' Harbor (later renamed to Hero's Harbor) was planned to explore the stories behind mythical adventurers such as Sinbad and Ulysses. The entrance was going to be through the Aqua-labyrinth, a maze whose walls were made of water.

==== Boardwalk and Fleets of Fantasy ====
A boardwalk was to be reminiscent of The Pike. This would have been built adjacent to Fleets of Fantasy, a harbor featuring rides and dining onboard historical replica ships. Elements of both were later incorporated as the American Waterfront land at Tokyo DisneySea, including the SS Columbia moored in the American Waterfront's New York Harbor.

==== Venture Reefs ====
The Preliminary Master Plan (1990) included activities such as shark diving. This section of the amusement park was later labelled Venture Reef in 1991 by Port Disney News. These themed environments included a Grecian village, an Asian water market, and a Caribbean lagoon.

== Port Disney News (1991) Updates ==
Port Disney News (1991), was published at the time where Walt Disney Imagineering had not finalized the list of green-lit lands. Updated descriptions for Venture Reefs, Fleets of Fantasy, Mysterious Island and Hero's Harbor were included in this publication.

== Cancellation of Port Disney and DisneySea (1991) ==
There were many factors that hindered the construction of Port Disney and DisneySea, which eventually lead to its cancellation in 1991.

=== California Coastal Act ===
Resistance from the community in Long Beach especially from local environmentalists was strong throughout the construction of Port Disney and DisneySea. This was one of the factors which resulted in the California Coastal Act, which denied permission to fill the ports needed to expand development.

=== Financial Issues ===
Another adversity was its expense. Being almost 3 billion USD with unfavorable reception, Disney eventually canceled the construction.

Historian Michael Crawford mentioned in retrospect, “Dollar signs that killed that project,”.
