= Daisy Lake Uplands Provincial Park =

Provincial park in Ontario, Canada

- IUCN category Ia (strict nature reserve)
- Location within Ontario
- Interactive map of Daisy Lake Uplands Provincial Park
- Location: Greater Sudbury, Ontario, Canada
- Coordinates: 46°27′36″N 80°52′49″W
- Area: 620 hectares (1,500 acres)
- Established: 2006; 20 years ago
- Governing body: Ontario Parks
- Website: www.ontarioparks.ca/park/daisylakeuplands

Daisy Lake Uplands Provincial Park is a provincial park in the Canadian province of Ontario. Surrounding Daisy Lake in the city of Greater Sudbury, the park serves to protect a recovering ecosystem scarred by pollution from the city's mining industry; one of the industry's first roasting beds in the region was located just east of the park boundaries. The park's ecosystem includes white birch trees, grasses, sedges, rock barrens and bog vegetation. The site is designated as a control area for ecological research—unlike in other parts of the city, where extensive environmental mitigation and recovery programs have been undertaken since the 1970s, Daisy Lake Uplands is set aside for study of the site's ability to recover on its own without human intervention. The park was first proposed for creation in 2003, and was officially designated by an amendment to the Ontario Provincial Parks Act in 2006.

The park, 620 hectares (1,500 acres) in size, is considered a non-operating park, with no visitor facilities and no camping.

The Southeast Bypass, the alignment of Highway 17 in the region, passes through the northwest corner of the park.

In 2012, concerns were raised about the potential impact on the lake and the park from a proposed realignment of Highway 69 in the area, which would have passed through the wetlands separating Daisy and Richard Lakes en route to a new interchange with Highway 17 inside the nearby Lake Laurentian Conservation Area. The Ontario Ministry of Transportation has since excluded the Daisy Lake realignment from its route planning process.
