= West River, Ontario =

West River
- Location of West River in Ontario
- Coordinates: 46°08′43″N 81°45′14″W
- Country: Canada
- Province: Ontario
- Region: Northeastern Ontario
- District: Sudbury
- Elevation: 215 m (705 ft)
- Time zone: UTC-5 (Eastern Time Zone)
  - Summer (DST): UTC-4 (Eastern Time Zone)
- FSA: P0M
- Area code: 705

West River is an unincorporated community in the geographic township of Mongowin, Sudbury District in Northeastern Ontario, Canada. It is named for the West River, which flows through the community just upstream of its mouth at the Whitefish River.

West River lies on Ontario Highway 6, and is approximately 15 kilometres (9 mi) south of Espanola and 5 kilometres (3 mi) north of Whitefish Falls.

The community was formerly a stop along the Algoma Eastern Railway, which linked Manitoulin Island with Lake Huron's North Shore and, ultimately, with Sudbury. The historic rail line has been defunct for a number of years and the tracks have been lifted south of Espanola.
