= Disney's America =

Canceled theme park

- Interactive map of Disney's America
- Location: Haymarket, Virginia (original concept); Knott's Berry Farm, Buena Park, California (revived concept)
- Coordinates: 38°49′55″N 77°38′39″W
- Status: Cancelled
- Owner: The Walt Disney Company
- Operated by: Walt Disney Parks and Resorts
- Theme: American History
- Attendance: 11 million (projected)

Disney's America was a proposed Disney theme park in the early 1990s. A site was selected in Haymarket, Virginia, approximately five miles (8.0 km) from Manassas National Battlefield Park and 35 miles (56 km) west of Washington, D.C., accessible from Interstate 66. Disney's America would have consisted of nine distinctly themed areas spanning 125–185 acres (51–75 ha), and it would have featured hotels, housing, a golf course, and nearly 2,000,000 square feet (190,000 m^{2}) of retail and commercial development.

The $650-million project (equivalent to $1.24 billion in 2024) was announced on November 11, 1993. It would have been themed to the history of the United States, and it was scheduled to open in 1998. The project had initial support from various politicians and local officials, but it soon faced opposition from citizen's groups and historians who objected to Disney's planned portrayal of historical events, as well as the potential impact on nearby historic sites. It was cancelled in September 1994 following disappointing early results for Euro Disney (now Disneyland Paris), the death of Frank Wells, rising costs, the prospect of reduced profits with the park being closed for four months each year, and vigorous public protest from historians and activists.

When Knott's Berry Farm in Buena Park, California, went on sale in 1997, discussions to buy the park and retheme it revived the concept. However, the Knott family refused to sell to Disney, citing concerns over Disney's plans, and the project failed to take off. Several of the proposed elements of Disney's America were incorporated into Disney's California Adventure, which opened in 2001.

== History ==
Proposed location for Disney's America.

Then-Disney CEO Michael Eisner stated the genesis for Disney's America was sparked by a visit taken by him and other Disney executives to Colonial Williamsburg three to four years before the 1993 announcement. After coming up with the concept, Disney spent two years scouting potential sites near Washington, D.C. However, officials from Explore Park, a history theme park near Roanoke that opened in 1994, alleged that Disney stole some of the ideas for Disney's America from their park after a 1987 meeting between the officials from the two companies.

=== Announcement and initial support ===
At the time it was announced on November 11, 1993, Disney had already purchased or held options on the 3,000 acres (1,200 ha) of land needed for the proposed park. After concept plans for Disney's America were drawn up for the history-based attraction in 1993, it became Eisner's pet project. Eisner obtained the support of outgoing Governor L. Douglas Wilder (D) and incoming Gov. George Allen (R), as well as the Virginia Commission on Population Growth and Development. Wilder said he was "pleased that you [Disney] have come to us," and Allen promised to "kick down any hurdles" that would hold up the park. Wilder, who had learned of the proposed park approximately two weeks before the announcement, elaborated that Disney had not forced Virginia into a bidding war through government concessions to attract the development, in contrast with the first American Legoland park, which was the subject of an ongoing competition between Prince William County and Carlsbad, California. Many local citizens, including the head of the Haymarket Historical Commission, supported the project for economic reasons. As originally proposed, Disney's America would have created 1,900 jobs and generated $50 million annually in tax revenue.

This is not a Pollyanna view of America. We want to make you a Civil War soldier. We want to make you feel what it was like to be a slave or what it was like to escape through the underground railroad.

— Bob Weis, Disney Senior Vice President (November 1993)

Peter Rummell, president of Disney Design & Development, stated the park was designed to be a one-day experience, and the goal was to make history "real but also make it fun." Rummell acknowledged that creating entertainment around historical events such as slavery and the Civil War could be controversial, but he elaborated that "an intelligent story, properly told, shouldn't offend anybody ... But we won't worry about being politically correct." The location was chosen to tap into the tourist crowds visiting Washington, D.C., and several local attractions, including the battlefield at Manassas, Kings Dominion, Busch Gardens, Jamestown, Yorktown, Colonial Williamsburg, and the Dulles-based Udvar-Hazy Center of the National Air and Space Museum.

Although Disney did not ask for concessions at the announcement in November 1993, the company warned the purchase of land options would not proceed without improvements in roads and infrastructure. Allen proposed US$163,200,000 (equivalent to $354,500,000 in 2025) in State of Virginia spending, one of the costliest incentive packages offered to-date, to improve roads at the proposed Disney site, defray relocation costs, and promote tourism in the area. In addition, Prince William County had requested US$50,000,000 (equivalent to $108,610,000 in 2025) in loans from Virginia to improve water and sewer lines. The project was granted subsidies by the Virginia state government in March 1994, with Disney advancing the subsidy proposal on the last possible day and threatening to abandon the project if it was not passed. The Disney's America project received additional project support as late as September.

=== Opposition and protests ===
==== Opposition materializes ====
The parcel intended to host Disney's America was close to the town of Haymarket and the Manassas National Battlefield Park.

Public opposition to the theme park and associated development was stronger than Disney expected, especially from a vocal group of prominent historians named Protect Historic America. Historian David McCullough described Disney's America as a potential "commercial blitzkrieg" in May 1994, predicting the same urban sprawl that surrounds Disneyland and Disney World for Virginia. Other members of Protect Historic America included C. Vann Woodward, John Hope Franklin, James M. McPherson, Barbara J. Fields, Doris Kearns Goodwin, Shelby Foote, Arthur M. Schlesinger Jr., William Styron, Tom Wicker, Richard Moe and Roger Wilkins. McPherson warned that sprawl "would desecrate the ground over which men fought and died." These opponents advocated for the protection of some 8,700 square miles (23,000 km^{2}) of land in order to prevent any large developments like Disney's America.

Disney also faced opposition from groups concerned that historical events such as the Civil War and slavery could be trivialized by teaching history through entertainment and possibly selling "little souvenir slave ships." In particular, scholars objected that Disney's past portrayals of American history deviated significantly from the truth. Eisner would later disavow comments from Weis, a senior vice president who had stated a planned exhibit on slavery would "make you feel what it was like to be a slave," saying that Weis had misspoken and was not used to speaking to the media. Rummell also rejected the fears as premature: "Those are harsh words for a production that not only hasn't opened, but hasn't even been fully written." Weis later stressed the content of the park had not yet been decided, saying "I'm not sure we have a certain direction yet ... Our thoughts are evolving" in March 1994. By August 1994, novelist William Styron penned an opinion that any exhibit that would allow visitors to "experience" slavery would be inadequate and soon afterward, Disney announced the proposed slavery exhibit had been shelved.

In addition, the heavy subsidies proposed from Virginia faced opposition in the state legislature. By late February 1994, the planned Disney park was still locally popular in Haymarket, but faced opposition from nearby towns who echoed McCullough's prediction: "following [the theme park] will be all the things people want, gas stations, motels and, God help us, the fast-food strips." A national farm conservation group, the American Farmland Trust, voiced its opposition to the project, saying it threatened up to 50% of the state's orchards and 15% of its farmland. Proponents of the theme park project alleged Protect Historic America was merely a front to advance the interests of wealthy landowners who owned land close to the planned development.

Disney projected up to 35,000 automobiles per day, which raised traffic and pollution concerns amongst local residents. The Disney official in charge of the project, Mark Pacala, penned an editorial touting planned road improvements as benefiting all motorists. Virginia Transportation Secretary Robert E. Martinez announced the state would seek a full federal review of the planned freeway improvements, which would delay the approval of road construction funds.

Other residents, citing the already-low unemployment rates, were skeptical of the economic boost generated by the park. An economic report commissioned by park opponents said that Disney had overstated economic benefits, saying that only 6,000 (not 12,000) jobs would be created, in mostly low-wage, low-skill categories, and the park would only bring in an additional $1.5–5.1 million in annual tax revenue (compared to the $14.1 million Disney had estimated). Operators of other area attractions, including Colonial Williamsburg, feared that Disney's America would siphon away tourist time and spending instead of adding another attraction for the Washington, D.C., area. Disney Vice President John Dreyer dismissed these protesters as stereotypical NIMBY citizens, saying "I think it's very similar to the arguments you've heard about a dozen projects around the country—which is, 'I'm here, I don't want anyone else to come.' " Despite the vocal opposition, polls showed a majority of Virginia residents supported the project.

Rep. Michael A. Andrews (D-TX), a Civil War buff, introduced a resolution on June 16, 1994, to send a message to Disney not to build the project in the proposed location, saying he was "not opposed to Disney or the park, as long as the project is built in another location." Andrews was joined in support by Reps. Tim Roemer (D-IN) and Robert Torricelli (D-NJ), with Torricelli adding that Civil War history should "not [be taught] by Minnie and Mickey Mouse and Donald Duck." In total there were 29 cosponsors for the resolution. But even as several representatives promised to take any federal actions to prevent Disney's America from being built near Manassas, Eisner and House Speaker Tom Foley (D-WA) hosted a lunch for Congress members in support of the project.

On June 22, 1994, a Senate subcommittee hearing was held in regards to the validity of the proposed development of Disney's America. Elected officials and Disney executives testified in support of the project, while historians testified in opposition. Sens. John Warner (R-VA), Ben Nighthorse Campbell (D-CO), and other officials argued that Congress had no business intervening in what was a state project. The same day, a Prince William County judge dismissed a lawsuit that had been brought by Disney's America opponents on the grounds that the proposed park violated local zoning ordinances.

==== Eisner's response and continued opposition ====
Disney's America not only will not replace historic sites but rather will add to their luster by enthusing our guests about events that occurred there and the people who took part in them. We are confident our project will actually encourage more people to visit historic areas. And we believe our presentation of the American heritage can make a significant national contribution to the important cause of historic preservation.

We plan to use all of the tools available to us -- filmmaking, animation, environments, music, interactive media, live interpretation -- to bring the American experience to life. We are working with historians and other experts to make Disney's America an engaging and genuine encounter with America's past. Together, we have identified some common themes that run through the American experience -- our persistent resistance to injustice, our quest for tolerance and inclusion, our history of rising to challenges, our faith in the promise of the future and our belief that ordinary people can accomplish extraordinary things.

We believe that every person, particularly the children, who can touch history and sense the emotions of a time or event, will be impelled to learn more. This is the vision and purpose of Disney's America.

— Michael Eisner, Chairman and CEO of The Walt Disney Company (June 1994)

Eisner rebuked protesters and detractors, especially the historian members of Protect Historic America, saying in a June 1994 interview with The Washington Post that "I sat through many history classes where I read some of their stuff, and I didn't learn anything. It was pretty boring. I guess I can say that I object to some of their stuff." Eisner was surprised by the opposition, stating that he had "expected to be taken around on people's shoulders" for both the economic stimulus of 19,000 new jobs and the entertainment value that would allow visitors "to get high on history." In the same interview, Eisner reiterated Disney's rights to develop on the 3,000 acres (1,200 ha), saying "it's private land that is not in the middle of a historic area." Eisner did not rule out moving the park to other sites, noting that the governors of Maryland and North Carolina had begun to court the company.

In order to try to convince historians who were opposed to the project, Eisner brought a group of historians to Epcot to see The American Adventure. However, the historians reacted negatively to the exhibition, and Eisner later said that the historians probably had the impression that "Disney couldn’t be trusted to depict American history in ways that were sufficiently complex, subtle and inclusive". The group also went to see The Hall of Presidents at Magic Kingdom, which received generally positive acclaim from the historians.

Disney's America faced new setbacks in the coming months. A new analysis found that the park would need to be closed for four months per year instead of two, decreasing potential revenue by 20%. Further, the projected construction costs were rising, and Eisner was concerned that it would not be profitable to build Disney's America in the first place. In mid-September 1994, a crowd of 3,000 protesters, including Ralph Nader, staged a march in Washington, D.C., opposing the park. Specific objections at the march included Disney's precedent of lobbying for and receiving State concessions for a Disney owned privatized governing district in Florida and skepticism about Disney's plans to "make you feel what it was like to be a slave."

=== Project abandonment ===
We remain convinced that a park that celebrates America and an exploration of our heritage is a great idea, and we will continue to work to make it a reality. However, we recognize that there are those who have been concerned about the possible impact of our park on historic sites in this unique area, and we have always tried to be sensitive to the issue. While we do not agree with all their concerns, we are seeking a new location so that we can move the process forward ...

Despite our confidence that we would eventually win the necessary approvals, it has become clear that we could not say when the park would be able to open -- or even when we could break ground ...

The controversy over building in Prince William County has diverted attention and resources from the creative development of the park. Implicit in our vision for the park is the hope that it will be a source of pride and unity for all Americans. We certainly cannot let a particular site undermine that goal by becoming a source of divisiveness.

— Peter S. Rummel, president of Disney Design and Development Co. (September 1994)

On September 28, 1994, Disney announced they would not build the Disney's America theme park at the originally-proposed site near Manassas, despite the political backing of numerous officials. By the time Disney withdrew the project from Haymarket, the New York Times reported that Disney felt they could gain official but not public approval, resulting in unacceptable delays. Disney Parks and Resorts was also disadvantaged by the financial failure of Disneyland Paris, which had lost nearly $900 million since its 1992 opening. These financial troubles also led to the abandonment of other theme park projects in the 1990s, including WestCOT and Port Disney. Further, opponents of Disney's America had sizable financing, with over $2 million allocated toward marketing campaigns against the project.

Disney put the 600 acres (240 ha) of land they had already acquired up for sale in March 1995 and relinquished options to purchase an adjacent 2,037-acre (824 ha) property in December 1994. The land slated for the proposed park has instead since been used to build tens of thousands of single and multi-family homesites in the Dominion Valley and Piedmont housing developments and Camp William B. Snyder for the Boy Scouts of America. Since the demise of the Haymarket project, the promised road improvements have been on hold and traffic has increased from the housing developments built on the site, though some residents credit the new housing with attracting a wealthier, more-educated population; the population of Prince William County grew by nearly 100,000 people in the 10 years following the end of the project.

At the same time they announced they were abandoning the Haymarket site, Disney announced they still intended to build the theme park at a "less controversial" site in either Virginia or Maryland. One anonymous Wall Street analyst claimed there was a schism in support for Disney's America amongst top executives at Disney, including opposition from the recently ousted Jeffrey Katzenberg.

== Park plans ==
Themed areas in the 1994 proposal for Disney's America

=== Themed areas ===
The plans for Disney's America called for nine distinctly themed areas within a 125–185-acre (51–75 ha) theme park serving up to 30,000 visitors per day. Much of the information is taken from a promotional brochure published by The Walt Disney Company in 1994.

- Crossroads USA, 1800–1850 – A pre-Civil War-era village that would have served as the hub of Disney's America. Guests would enter under an 1840s train trestle, which would have featured antique steam trains circling the park. According to an early map, this land would have featured large amphitheater, an attraction named The Muppets Take America, and something themed around Roots.
- Native America, 1600–1810 – A recreation of a Native American village that would have reflected the tribes that were known in that part of the country. Guests would have also enjoyed interactive experiences, exhibits, and arts and crafts, as well as a whitewater river raft ride that would have traveled throughout the area, based on the Lewis and Clark Expedition.
- Presidents' Square, 1750–1800 – A celebration of the birth of democracy and those who fought to preserve it. The Hall of Presidents, and The American Adventure would have been replicated or relocated in this section of Disney's America from, respectively, Magic Kingdom Park and Epcot at Walt Disney World.
- Civil War Fort, 1850–1870 – A Civil War fort would have plunged guests into a more turbulent time of American history; with an adjacent replica battlefield where Civil War re-enactments would be staged and an adjacent man-made Freedom Bay, where water battles between the Monitor and the Merrimac would have been staged as a "thrilling nighttime spectacular".
- Enterprise, 1870–1930 – Also referred to as "Industry and Innovation" on some early maps - A mock factory town, it would have highlighted American ingenuity where guests could have ridden a major attraction called Industrial Revolution, traveling on a roller coaster-type ride through a 19th-century landscape with heavy industry and blast furnaces. On either side of the ride would have been exhibits of technology that defined America's industry, and developments that would have defined future industries.
- We The People, 1870–1930 – A replica of the Ellis Island building, which acted as the gateway to America for many immigrants in the 19th and early 20th centuries. Music, restaurants, and a live show would be here.
- Family Farm, 1930–1945 – A recreation of an authentic farm where guests could have had the opportunity to see different types of industries related to food production, in addition to hands-on experiences.
- State Fair, 1930–1945 – An area based on "small town America" with a live show about baseball and county fair-themed rides, including a 60-foot (18 m) Ferris wheel and a wooden roller coaster.
- Victory Field, 1930–1945 – Guests would have experienced what America's soldiers faced in the defense of freedom during world wars. It would have been themed to resemble an air field with a series of hangars containing attractions based on America's military might using virtual reality technology. The air field would have also served as an exhibit of airplanes from different periods, as well as for major flying exhibitions. Concepts for what would have been the world's first dueling inverted roller coasters, which would have been named Dogfighter, were drawn up, but were ultimately abandoned due to the projected cost of the attraction. The ride would have had guests flying through the air in German and American biplane-themed trains, and would have featured several near misses. Both tracks would have featured inversions (the American track featured a cobra roll, a vertical loop, a zero-g roll, and two corkscrews; the German track featured the same elements with an extra corkscrew leading into the final brake run), and at one point the German train would have come close to hitting both the floor and walls of a trench and a tank as it looped over a tank that had crashed into the trench.

Some of the ideas alleged to be lifted from Explore Park for Disney's America include the Lewis and Clark-themed water ride, Native American village, American main street and working family farm.

=== Additional proposed development ===
According to Rummell, plans also included:

- resort hotels (with 1,340 guest rooms)
- an RV park (with 300 campsites)
- a 27-hole golf course
- nearly 2,000,000 square feet (190,000 m^{2}) for retail and commercial development, split into 1,300,000 square feet (120,000 m^{2}) of retail and 630,000 square feet (59,000 m^{2}) of commercial space

Additionally, there were tentative plans to sell a portion of the land to a developer to build over 2,000 residential units and donate land for other municipal buildings, including schools and a library. Disney intended to leave up to 40% of the total land undeveloped as a greenbelt/buffer between the Park and its surroundings.

=== Disney's American Celebration ===
Faced with public relations issues in the wake of vocal opposition, Disney put together a conceptual study of a park in August 1994 with an overarching theme celebrating common American themes and experiences. The conceptual study was discontinued weeks later. The planned pavilions for Disney's American Celebration would have included:

- Democracy, the entrance area featuring attractions such as America: A User's Guide, the American Free Speech Forum and the American Hall of Fame.
- Family or Generations, featuring a multi-media show called American Families following four generations of a family from 1929 to 1999.
- The Land, based on the Epcot attraction of the same name.
- Creativity and Fun, similar to the original concept for State Fair, featuring a full-scale recreation of Ebbets Field and Coney Island-themed attractions.
- Work featuring factory tours of iconic American companies such as Apple, Ben & Jerry's and Crayola.
- Service & Sacrifice, similar to the original concept for Victory Field, featuring the attraction Soldier's Story taking guests through memorable moments in American wars and other interactive areas where guests could attempt military training.
- American People telling the Immigration Story on a ride and film featuring the Muppets as well as the Dream of Freedom movie discussing the ongoing struggle for freedom and equality.
- Streets of America, a dining district featuring "streets" themed for cuisine from different cities, including:
  - Chicago (Chicago-style pizza)
  - Los Angeles (Hispanic and fast food)
  - New Orleans (Cajun)
  - New York City (Jewish/deli food)
  - St. Louis (barbecued ribs)
  - San Francisco (Chinese)
- Disney's America Live, the entertainment venue featuring outdoor stages and the State Farm Arena where guests could attempt hog calling and calf roping.

== Proposed conversion of Knott's Berry Farm ==
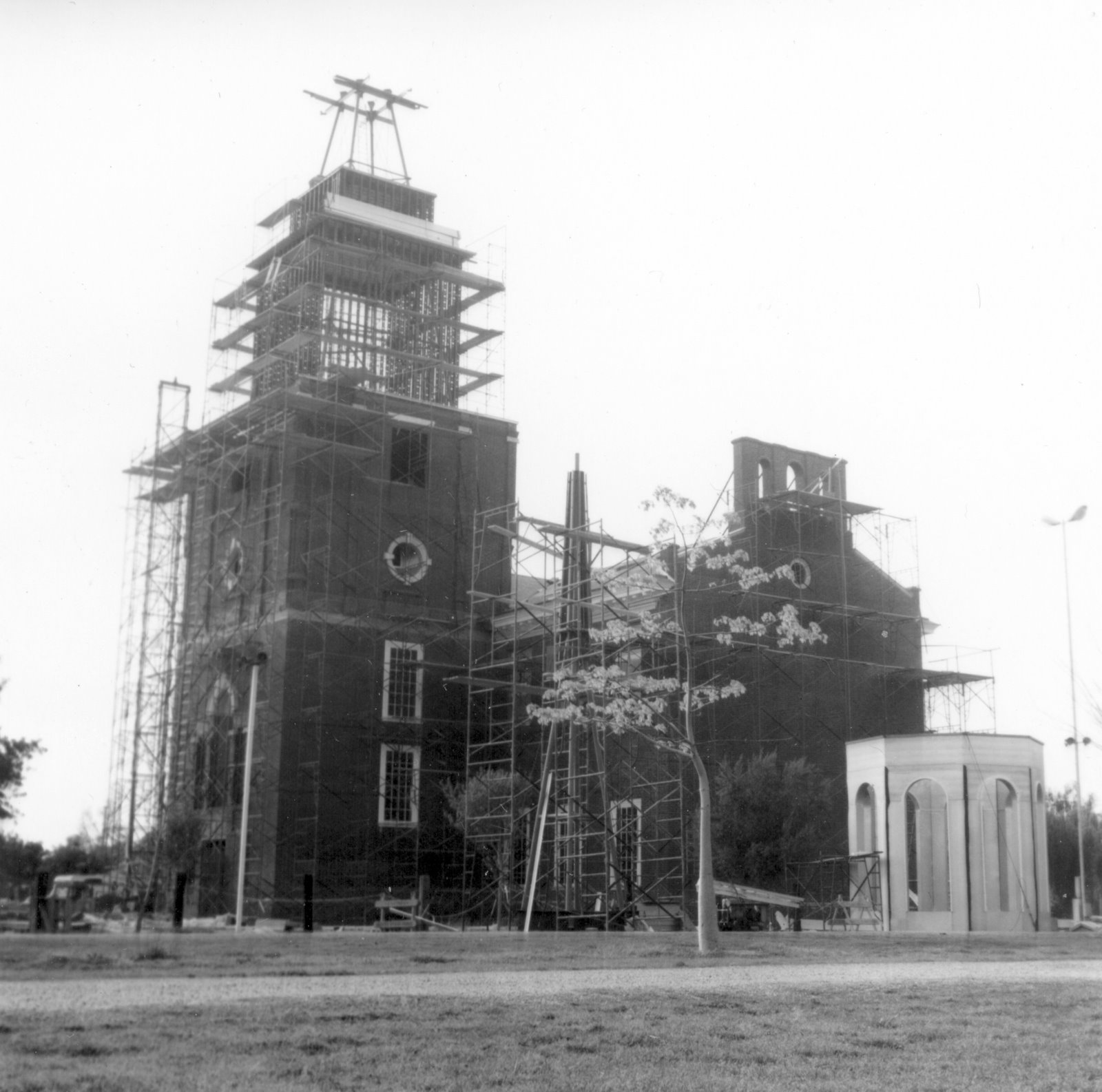
Independence Hall replica construction at Knott's Berry Farm, March 17, 1966. Courtesy of Orange County Archives.

A conversion of Knott's Berry Farm (in Buena Park, California, near Disneyland) into Disney's America was drafted shortly after the Knott family announced that they would take bids for its property. The idea for the conversion reportedly came from the exact replica of Independence Hall, which sits in the parking lot of Knott's Berry Farm.

The plan called for stretching out the park's entrance across the street to the Independence Hall replica. The new entrance to the park would then be built to resemble Walt Disney World's Liberty Square, although the name of the entrance would have been changed to Presidents' Square. The major attraction for this area would have included the Hall of Presidents.

Another section of the proposed park would have included the "Native American" territories as it would have paid tribute to America's native people. The area would have included where the Mystery Lodge, Indian Trail, and Bigfoot Rapids are currently located. Also, Bigfoot Rapids would have had its name changed to The Lewis & Clark River Expedition, which was a similar attraction proposed for Virginia. This idea was eventually scrapped because the Imagineers felt it was an "inconsistent hybrid of thrills and education."

Other proposed ideas would have been the conversion of the former Roaring '20s section into the "Enterprise" territory. Reflection Lake would have been converted to Freedom Bay, and would have showcased a recreation of the Ellis Island immigration center. Finally, the Old Ghost Town section of Knott's Berry Farm would have been mostly unchanged. Camp Snoopy and Fiesta Village probably also would have been converted into different "territories".

The California Disney's America project was cancelled due to several reasons. One was a lack of a practical means to transport guests from the Disneyland Resort to Disney's America. Planners felt that extending the existing Disneyland Monorail System would be too expensive; they also noted that bus transportation would not have been practical. The main factor was that the Knott family had rejected Disney's bid since they were afraid that the Imagineers would replace much of what their parents had originally built. Cedar Fair, the company that bought Knott's Berry Farm in 1997, removed more original features from the park than Disney's plans would have done, although keeping the Knott's name and layout intact.

== Ideas transferred to other parks ==
Soarin' from Epcot and Disney's California Adventure evolved from some of the rides planned for Victory Field. Other concepts originally intended for Disney's America were slightly re-themed and re-worked as elements of Disney California Adventure, including the Bountiful Valley Farm (Family Farm), Grizzly River Run (Lewis and Clark Expedition raft ride), California Screamin' (State Fair roller coaster ride) as well as Condor Flats (Victory Field).

== In media ==
In 1995, English musician Graham Parker released a song about the planned park on his album 12 Haunted Episodes. The song was well-received and considered, "the best of his latest batch," according to Mike Boehm of the Los Angeles Times. The song was considered a critique of "soulless commercialism."

== See also ==
- Freedomland U.S.A., a defunct American history-themed amusement park in New York City, loosely based on the original Disneyland
- Marriott's Great America, another unbuilt amusement park planned for Manassas, Virginia

== Bibliography ==
- Crawford, Michael (2015). "33: Disney's America". The Progress City Primer: Stories, Secrets, and Silliness from the Many Worlds of Walt Disney. Orlando, Florida: Progress City Press. pp. 285–307. ISBN 978-0-9862050-6-4.
