= Lake Panache =

Lake in Ontario, Canada

- Location within Ontario
- Location: Sudbury District, Ontario
- Coordinates: 46°15′N 81°19′W
- Primary inflows: Whitefish River
- Primary outflows: Whitefish River
- Basin countries: Canada

Lake Panache is a lake in the Canadian province of Ontario. It is located in the Sudbury District, although a small portion of the lake lies within the southernmost city limits of Greater Sudbury, approximately 10 kilometres south of the community of Whitefish.

The lake's westernmost point lies within Foster township near Espanola, and its easternmost point lies within Bevin township south of Lively.

Its main water inflow and outflow is the Whitefish River system. Part of the lake's southern shore forms the boundary of Killarney Lakelands and Headwaters Provincial Park, an extension of Killarney Provincial Park which was designated in 2006.

The lake was originally named Panache, in the Canadian French sense of antlers, for its resemblance to a moose antler. It is not known exactly when the lake was so named, although the name appears on maps of the area dating as far back as 1863. Over time, however, the common English spelling of the name morphed into Penage. More recently, official usage has reverted to the original Panache spelling, although Penage is still sometimes seen in everyday usage.

A popular recreational cottage lake in the region, the lake is accessible by two roads, Municipal Road 10 (Panache Lake Road) in Greater Sudbury and Penage Lake Road in Espanola. Much of the lake, however, is accessible only via boat from marinas at the ends of the two access roads.

The eastern portion of the lake was served by two full service marinas. Gemmell's and Whitehead's are competing marinas providing car and boat parking, fuel, groceries, bait and water taxi service. Gemmell's changed hands in the fall of 1966 and was purchased by the Lundgren and Sutinen families and was renamed Penage Marina.

Whitehead's marina was purchased by Bill Blanchard and then resold to Vic and Judy Erola. In the late-1970s, Delky and Louis Dozzi purchased the Erola interests and renamed the marina Penage Bay Marina. In the early-1970s, the Lundgren's sold out to the Sutinen family. In June 1980 the Dozzi brothers purchased the Penage Marina from the Sutinens and combined the two marinas. After 30 years of ownership, Louis Dozzi sold the Penage Bay Marina in 2007 to Guy Richard. In 2021 Guy sold the marina to Brendan and Alex and was rebranded to Panache Bay Marina.

The Panache Campers Association has been in the forefront in providing a safe environment for all on the lake. The Association funds and maintains the hazard beacons on the lake as well as being the stewards for a safe and clean environment for all.

== See also ==
- List of lakes in Ontario
