= Killarney Lakelands and Headwaters Provincial Park =

Provincial park in Ontario, Canada

Coordinates: 46.2369°N 81.4022°W

- IUCN category II (national park)
- Nearest city: Sudbury, Ontario
- Area: 153.74 km^{2} (59.36 sq mi)
- Established: 2006
- Governing body: Ontario Parks

Killarney Lakelands and Headwaters Provincial Park is a provincial park in central Ontario, Canada. Located primarily within the Sudbury District with a small portion located in the Walden area of Greater Sudbury, the park was created in 2006 as an expansion of the adjacent Killarney Provincial Park.

The park consists of two non-contiguous areas. The more westerly section is adjacent to Killarney Provincial Park on its south boundary and to the Whitefish River system on its north, while the easterly section is adjacent to Lake Panache on its north and wraps around the eastern boundary of Killarney Provincial Park to the point where the park meets Highway 637. The two areas are separated by the Killarney North Forest Reserve.

Vegetation in the park includes poplar, pine, white birch, white spruce, sugar maple, red maple, balsam fir, black spruce, ironwood, red oak, hemlock, yellow birch and cedar trees, as well as wetlands and shoreline habitats. The area is part of a study site for researchers from Laurentian University studying natural ecological characteristics of aquatic environments.

Killarney Lakelands and Headwaters was designated as a separate park, rather than as an expansion of Killarney Provincial Park, due to its designation as a natural environment class park rather than Killarney Lakelands and Headwaters' wilderness class designation. Despite its separate designation, however, it is included in Ontario Parks publications for Killarney Provincial Park, as well as the service area of the non-profit organization Friends of Killarney Park.

Natural resource industries are not permitted on the park lands, although a winter road passes through the park to enable access to a forestry area on Crown lands outside of the park boundaries.

== See also ==
- List of Ontario Parks
- La Cloche Silhouette Trail
