= Daisy Lake (Greater Sudbury) =

- Location of Daisy Lake in Ontario.
- Location: Greater Sudbury, Ontario, Canada
- Coordinates: 46°26′59″N 80°53′21″W
- Type: Lake
- Primary inflows: Whitefish River
- Max. length: 3.2 km (2.0 mi)
- Max. width: 0.3 km (0.19 mi)
- Surface elevation: 230 m (750 ft)

Daisy Lake is a lake in the city of Greater Sudbury in northeastern Ontario, Canada. It is in the Lake Huron drainage basin and is the source of the Whitefish River.

The lake is about 3.2 kilometres (2.0 mi) long and 0.3 kilometres (0.2 mi) wide, lies at an elevation of 230 metres (755 ft), and is located about 4 kilometres (2 mi) east of the community of McFarlane Lake and 0.7 kilometres (0.4 mi) south of Ontario Highway 17. There is one unnamed creek inflow, and the primary outflow is the Whitefish River which flows to the North Channel on Lake Huron.

The lake is also home to the new Daisy Lake Uplands Provincial Park.

== See also ==
- List of lakes in Ontario
