= Port Disney =

Cancelled property development

DisneySea
- Location: Port Disney, Long Beach, California, U.S.A.
- Coordinates: 33°44′48″N 118°11′06″W
- Status: Cancelled
- Owner: Walt Disney Parks and Resorts
- Theme: Nautical

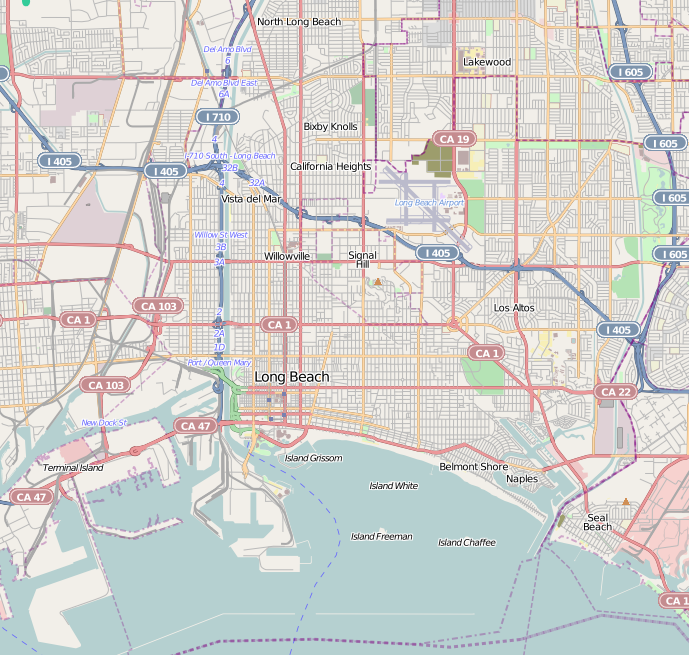
Port Disney would have been built on Queensway Bay at the mouth of the Los Angeles River.

Port Disney was a planned Walt Disney resort spanning 443 acres (179 ha) surrounding Queensway Bay next to the Port of Long Beach in Long Beach, California, United States. The property was going to feature a marine-themed amusement park, a marina, a cruise ship port, a specialty retail and entertainment area, and hotel accommodations. The land it would occupy housed the RMS Queen Mary and the Hughes H-4 Hercules aircraft (nicknamed the "Spruce Goose"), both of which were obtained by Disney in its acquisition of the Wrather company in 1989.

Port Disney was first announced in July 1990, originally presented to city and port officials in closed meetings, then revealed publicly later that month. This was followed by the publication of The Port Disney News, which was mailed directly to homes in 1991 to drum up public support. Mounting costs and local opposition led to the project's cancellation in December 1991, and Disney instead turned its attention to building the WestCOT theme park in Anaheim, California. Some of the park's planned elements were later incorporated into the development of Tokyo DisneySea in Japan, which opened in 2001. In March 1992, Disney announced plans to end its lease on the Queen Mary, Spruce Goose, and surrounding property, relinquishing development rights to all of its Long Beach properties.

== Port Disney planned amenities ==
Initial (1990) plan for Port Disney at full build-out included DisneySea, five hotels, a cruise ship port, and regular ferry and monorail service linking City-side and Port-side.

Port Disney was to be built in two phases:

1. Construction to occur from 1995–1999 for a 2000 opening
2. Expansion to occur from 2007–2009 for a 2010 opening

The planned Port Disney final build-out included development on both sides of Queensway Bay, at the mouth of the Los Angeles River. The northern side of Queensway Bay (adjacent to Long Beach's downtown) was called the "City-side", and the southern side (adjacent to the existing freight Port of Long Beach) was called the "Port-side".

Port Disney was publicly unveiled on July 31, 1990, and would have included the following attractions after the full build-out in 2010:

- The DisneySea theme park (Port-side)
- Five new resort hotels (3,900 new rooms in total) and waterfront restaurants
  - Shoreline Hotel and retail/entertainment center (City-side)
  - Tidelands Hotel (City-side)
  - Marina Hotel (City-side)
  - Canal Hotel (Port-side)
  - Port Hotel (Port-side)
- Water transportation, consisting of:
  - 400 new marina slips (250 long term and 150 guest slips, in two new marinas located Port-side)
  - The WorldPort ferry landing (for trans-Queensway Bay service), historic vessel harbor, and local (Orange County) harbor cruises (Port-side)
  - The Quay, offering excursions, dinner boats, and charters (Port-side, adjacent to Port Hotel)
  - A five-berth cruise ship port to distant destinations (Mexico, Seattle, San Diego; Port-side)
- A monorail linking the City- and Port-sides of Queensway Bay

The planned resort would have taken over the space occupied by the Spruce Goose, with the disposition of the plane unknown, and would have taken over two parcels of city parkland. The 3,900 proposed new rooms would have nearly doubled the then-4,800 room combined capacity of all hotels and motels within the city of Long Beach. The plan also called for filling 250 acres (100 ha) of ocean with 20,000,000 cubic yards (15,000,000 m^{3}) of material and asked the city to widen roads and improve infrastructure to accommodate a projected 13 million visitors per year, at a total proposed cost of US$2,000,000,000 (equivalent to $4,813,600,000 in 2024). The Queen Mary would have been moved 700 feet (210 m) to a new berth. The complexity of the proposed development meant that an agreement would have to be reached between Disney, the city of Long Beach, the Port of Long Beach, the California Coastal Commission, and the Army Corps of Engineers.

=== DisneySea Theme Park ===
The lone theme park touted for the new property would have been named DisneySea. However the park proposed for Long Beach at Port Disney would have been different from the DisneySea park that was eventually built in Tokyo.

Proposed attractions for the Long Beach DisneySea included:

- Oceana, the architectural centerpiece of DisneySea consisting of a complex of bubbles with a two-story "oceanarium" inside depicting the evolution of the seas. Within Oceana would be:
  - The Future Research Center, a working meeting center for oceanographic researchers
  - The Ocean Outreach Center, an educational "library of the sea"
- Mysterious Island, a recreation of Atlantis with a suspended thrill ride entitled Nemo's Lava Cruiser
- A boardwalk with amusement rides reminiscent of the Long Beach oceanfront during the glory days of The Pike
- Fleets of Fantasy, a harbor with replicas of ships hosting rides and restaurants
- Heroes′ or Hero′s Harbor, rides themed for mythological adventurers such as Sinbad and Odysseus
- A Grecian village
- An Asian water market
- Venture Reefs, a Caribbean lagoon featuring artificial tropical reefs and a shark cage dive experience

=== Port Disney News ===
Name changes in Port Disney Plan
Jul 1990 (Master Plan)	Sep 1991 (Port Disney News)
DisneySea	DisneySea Theme Park
Marina Hotel	Marina Villa Hotel
Tidelands Hotel	Tidelands Convention Hotel
Shoreline Hotel	Shoreline Suites Hotel
Canal Hotel	Regatta Hotel (west, adjacent to new marina)
Canal Hotel	Canal Hotel (east, adjacent to Queen Mary)
Port Hotel	Port Hotel
The Quay	Treasure Lagoon Park
WorldPort	International Port
unnamed Port-side marinas	Queensway Bay Marina (near Regatta Hotel)
unnamed Port-side marinas	Pier J Marina (near Cruise Ship Port)

The illustrative site plan presented in the Port Disney News brochure distributed to Long Beach residents had a slightly different layout and names for some of the featured attractions. The Canal Hotel was now split into two hotels, the Regatta Hotel (on the west side) and the Canal Hotel (on the east side). In addition, The Quay was now an enclosed park and renamed Treasure Lagoon Park.

== History ==
Wrather Corporation leased the Queen Mary from the City of Long Beach in 1981 and added the Spruce Goose the next year, making a pre-tax profit on the two attractions by 1983 after the city had sustained years of losses. Wrather made approximately US$7,000,000 (equivalent to $21,190,000 in 2024) in profit by 1984, but had invested US$40,000,000 (equivalent to $116,900,000 in 2024) in refurbishing and improving the two attractions. Wrather went on to announce ambitious plans to add a ten-story hotel and parking garage with 350 rooms and 30,000 sq ft (2,800 m^{2}) in meeting space to the site by 1988; if the hotel was successful, it was to be followed by a second phase building 'The Festival Marketplace' with 125,000 sq ft (11,600 m^{2}) in retail space; if the second phase was successful, a third phase with a 30,000 sq ft (2,800 m^{2}) exhibition hall would follow, capitalizing on the combined Queen Mary/Spruce Goose crowds of 3,000,000 tourists per year; and finally, five to six high-rise office buildings with a combined 900,000 sq ft (84,000 m^{2}) would be built contingent on prior successes. The proposal won the support of the Port of Long Beach, and would not require new fill.

=== Disney acquires Wrather Corporation ===
In addition to the Queen Mary and Spruce Goose attraction leases in Long Beach, Wrather Corp. also owned the Disneyland Hotel in Anaheim since its construction, making it an irresistible target for Disney. Wrather was acquired in late September 1987 by a new company formed as an equal partnership between the Walt Disney Company and Industrial Equity (Pacific) Ltd. of Hong Kong (IEP). IEP itself was controlled by Ronald Brierley and had already amassed 28% of the approximately 10.1 million publicly traded shares of Wrather Corporation. The remaining 72% of shares (7.3 million shares) were purchased by the Disney-IEP partnership at a cost of US$21 (equivalent to $58.12 in 2024) per share, for a total indicated price of US$152,300,000 (equivalent to $421,520,000 in 2024). Wrather had previously rejected an unsolicited offer in August 1987 from Disney at US$21.50 (equivalent to $59.51 in 2024) per share. Disney bought out IEP in March 1988 at a total indicated price of US$85,200,000 (equivalent to $226,520,765 in 2024), which was an offer on half the partnership's shares acquired in 1987 at a cost of US$23.49 (equivalent to $62.45 in 2024) per share. In doing so, Disney obtained sole ownership of the Disneyland Hotel and Long Beach attraction leases.

Since Wrather owned land adjacent to Disneyland, the acquisition of Wrather meant Disney could now either expand Disneyland or add a retail and entertainment district near the 1955 theme park. However, Wrather also held the rights to lease and develop 236 acres (96 ha) near the Queen Mary under the 1985 proposal, though much of that land was underwater, giving Disney the option to build a new park in Long Beach. By June 1989, Disney had already advanced a concept for an oceanfront theme park using the Queen Mary as a backdrop. As a first step, Disney won the right to develop a hotel on a 14.8 acres (6.0 ha) site near the intersection of Pine Avenue and Shoreline Drive, across the Queensway Bay from the Queen Mary.

=== Competition with Anaheim ===
In January 1990, Disney announced that a new $1-billion theme park would be built in either Long Beach or Anaheim, with Disney chairman Michael Eisner saying "It depends a lot on which community wants us more." While Disney only owned 66 acres (27 ha) in Anaheim for development (with the acquisition of the Disneyland Hotel), it held much larger options in Long Beach: the ex-Wrather Queen Mary and Spruce Goose leases for 55 acres (22 ha) and an option to develop an additional 256 acres (104 ha) of ocean. Long Beach City Councilman Evan Anderson Braude touted the existing infrastructure and transportation. Eisner pointed out the Long Beach Freeway, which ends at Queensway Bay, was one of the least-used freeways in the Los Angeles region. Long Beach officials touted the unique opportunity to develop the oceanside location and were considering engineered fill, tax exemptions, and parking garages to help attract a new theme park, but stopped short of wholeheartedly endorsing the idea, saying that impacts on economy and traffic would be studied first. Long Beach Mayor Ernie Kell said "That [Queensway Bay land] is some of the primest land in the world, and there are many uses for it. Yes, Disney would be a key (to the city's success.) But if Disney decides not to come here, it is not the end of the world."

In contrast, Anaheim Mayor Fred Hunter took "the first opportunity before Long Beach to say the answer is, 'Yes, yes, yes,'" and Anaheim "vowed to do 'almost anything' to be Disney's choice", although Mayor Hunter believed that both projects would eventually be built. Either project was anticipated to bring in millions of dollars in tax revenues to the winning city. Formal negotiations for financial responsibility between Disney and Long Beach were scheduled to begin on September 12, 1990, after the city reviewed Disney's plans.

Several independent analysts gave the edge to Port Disney, citing the uniqueness of the project and the lack of a similar nautical/ocean theme park in Los Angeles County since the 1987 closure of Marineland. In February 1991, Disney disclosed that it had been buying large tracts of land near Disneyland in Anaheim, although Disney vice-president of development David Malmuth said the land acquisition would not affect the decision between Anaheim and Long Beach, which would be announced by the end of 1991.

=== Local opposition ===
Although city officials were bullish, with City Councilman Les Robbins saying "[...] if you took a (council) vote today, it would be nine-zip to pursue Disney and leave no rock unturned", and Long Beach business owners asked the city to "bend over backward" for Disney, Long Beach residents remained cool to the idea, even before the concept was presented to the public for the first time on July 31, 1990. The public unveiling followed earlier closed-door meetings presenting the concepts between Disney and city officials. Some of the representatives from 80 neighborhood associations and businesses objected to added traffic from tourists, and felt that public subsidies in the form of infrastructure improvements were not warranted for Disney, a very profitable private corporation. Still others voiced concerns that Disney, notorious for unyielding enforcement of employee grooming and dress codes, would not fill the majority of the estimated 10,000 new jobs from the local population.

Schematic representation of fill required for Port Disney, orange overlay on photograph of Queensway Bay. The DisneySea theme park would have been built almost entirely on the new fill.

Michael Humphrey, then-president of the Belmont Heights Community Association, stated "[...] Long Beach might snub its nose at Disney. Who knows? We may see history in the making." The cool reception surprised Disney officials, although Disney's project director, David Malmuth, himself a resident of Long Beach, said the company would "be willing to listen and try to understand the community's concerns."

Following the public unveiling, more impacts to Long Beach were noted, including:

- The Port Disney project would entail filling 250 acres (100 ha) of ocean, requiring an offsetting restoration of similar habitat elsewhere in the state.
- Land taken for the project would displace the Spruce Goose and two existing city parks. The Queen Mary would need to be relocated.
- The new cruise ship port would compete with the existing Port of Los Angeles for cruise ship traffic.
- Road traffic had already reached levels projected for 2020, and the addition of 13 million annual visitors would require expensive city investments in wider roads and added infrastructure.

Traffic concerns were echoed by the South Coast Air Quality Management District, who felt that Disney had not fully reviewed the impact of 13 million guests per year, 70% of which were anticipated to travel by private car. Critics pointed out that even with contemplated widening of the Long Beach Freeway and the new Blue Line light rail service, no real improvements to alleviate traffic were included in the Preliminary Master Plan beyond hoping that traffic to Port Disney would run opposite to the traditional commute direction.

Following the unveiling, Disney met with community groups, contacting approximately 3,000 residents in total during meetings held, on average, three times a week, between August 1990 and February 1991. Citizens of Long Beach campaigned to ensure they would have a hand in the city government's evaluation of Disney's proposal. In October 1990, a plan was approved to set up a 21-member committee, composed of nine residents appointed by the city council (one per councilman), two residents appointed by the mayor, and ten residents nominated by recognized community groups.

Disney touted the benefits to the city, including linking the downtown district with the waterfront. At the time, the retail tax base in Long Beach was so poor the city was unable to support a shopping mall. In October 1990, Disney released a privately commissioned study which projected that tax revenues within Long Beach would rise by $47 million and that Long Beach alone would see 23,900 new jobs, consisting of 12,400 directly employed by Disney and the rest indirectly from businesses supporting the new Port Disney. City officials were skeptical as the numbers were provided by Disney and did not address the cost of modifications to infrastructure, which were later revealed to include a request for $880 million in road improvements, made during an early round of negotiations with Disney. A year later, employment issues remained, with opponents wondering whether park employees would be drawn from and reflect the diversity of Long Beach residents.

=== Public relations effort ===
Disney had already commissioned a report before declaring the competition open between Long Beach and Anaheim. The report was presented internally in October 1989 and estimated the economic impacts of new resorts as a strategic tool to build governmental support. The estimated annual tax revenue for the City of Long Beach was predicted to increase by US$79,700,000 (equivalent to $202,170,000 in 2024), with the majority of the revenue increase coming from property and hotel taxes. Anaheim's annual tax revenue was estimated to increase by US$59,400,000 (equivalent to $150,680,000 in 2024), with most of that coming from property tax, hotel tax, and convention center revenue. The later 1990 Port Disney Fiscal Impact Report provided a revised (decreased) annual tax revenue increase of US$55,500,000 (equivalent to $133,580,000 in 2024), again with most of the increase coming from hotel taxes. In comparison, the fiscal year 1991 city budget was estimated at only US$133,500,000 (equivalent to $321,300,000 in 2024).

The Friends of Port Disney group, formed to voice support for the proposed Port Disney project and advocate for the passage of SB 1062, was criticized as a sockpuppet of Disney; despite claims of independence, Disney donated the use of the Queen's Salon aboard Queen Mary for the announcement of the group's formation. Disney also allowed Friends of Port Disney to use their logo on invitations and bumper stickers. The Long Beach Chamber of Commerce endorsed the project "in concept" in October 1991, contingent on assurance the project would benefit the Long Beach business community.

Disney created a Port Disney project display room aboard the Queen Mary on the Promenade Deck in Picadilly Circus, open on Mondays and Wednesdays in the evening from 6 p.m. to 9 p.m. The project display room included a large 6-by-6-foot (1.8 by 1.8 m) model of the proposed Port Disney project and other project components.

In addition to community outreach events, Disney produced the Port Disney News publication and distributed it to Long Beach residents in 1991. The paper was made to look like a newspaper and was used mainly to create public support for the planned property. The Port Disney News saw only one issue and was abandoned. A similar publication was produced for Virginia residents relating to the unbuilt Disney's America park.

=== California SB 1062 ===
During negotiations between Disney and the California Coastal Commission, Commission members informed Disney the bulk of the proposed Port Disney project was not permitted under the Coastal Act. Recreational use was prohibited on the planned 250 acres (100 ha) of new fill. California State Senator Ken Maddy and coauthors Sens. Beverly, Dills and Presley introduced Senate Bill (SB) 1062 on March 8, 1991. SB 1062 was written on Disney's behalf to clarify and confirm that Disney would have the authority under the California Coastal Act to fill open waters and build Port Disney atop the fill. Later amendments to the proposed legislation would have clarified that recreation uses are permitted on new landfill, and was later amended to apply specifically to the city of Long Beach only. Environmental groups, including the Sierra Club, and the California Coastal Commission opposed the bill, saying that despite the proposed changes, it would allow similar projects along the California coastline. The proposed legislation was seen as threatening a habitat which supported the California brown pelican, and that it would set a dangerous precedent opening the way to offshore oil drilling. Other legislators attached amendments to the proposed legislation requiring Disney to restore Southern California wetlands and set park employee diversity goals.

The bill stalled in the California State Senate Natural Resources and Wildlife Committee, where hearings for the bill were postponed four times from April–May 1991 (three times in May alone). The Coastal Commission dropped its opposition to the bill in June 1991, overruling the recommendation from its executive director, Peter Douglas, who opposed the bill due to the projected impact on the important fish habitat in San Pedro Bay, off Long Beach. During closed-door negotiations, Disney and Committee members were unable to come to a compromise on the amount Disney would be required to pay for restoring wetlands elsewhere. Committee members initially proposed a 4:1 ratio of restoration to fill, meaning Disney and the City of Long Beach would be responsible for spending approximately $100 million to restore 1,000 acres (400 ha) to compensate for the proposed 250 acres (100 ha) of fill. Eventually, the Committee proposed a 3:1 ratio (approximately $75 million and 750 acres (300 ha) restored), while Disney would not budge from their proposal for a 2:1 ratio ($50 million, 500 acres (200 ha) restored). After discontinuing negotiations, Committee members were left with the impression that Disney would defer further negotiations to 1992.

Later in June 1991, the committee chairman canceled a hearing of the bill which was scheduled for June 25, 1991. State Senator/Chairman Dan McCorquodale felt that last-minute amendments submitted just before the scheduled hearing reneged on earlier promises that Disney had made to delay consideration of the bill until 1992, calling it "a highhanded effort of trying to breeze through the Legislature with a change that I think the Legislature has not wanted." Local business and labor leaders endorsed the proposed legislation, urging passage to provide educational opportunities and an economic boost to the region. Disney said the project would be "dead without passage of the bill." However, citing failure to reach an agreement for the specific amount it needed to spend to mitigate marine impacts, Disney shelved the legislation for further consideration in 1992.

=== Port of Long Beach and late changes ===
Sources at the Port of Long Beach privately commented they wished Disney would just "dry up and blow away", citing concerns that Port Disney could interfere with operations at the busy port. When Maersk signed a renewed lease with the Port in 1991, it included an escape clause that would allow Maersk to withdraw if Port Disney affected their operations.

Faced with the uncertainty of passing SB 1062 to allow recreational use on fill, Disney unveiled a revised proposal in October 1991 reducing the amount of fill required for Port Disney from 250 acres (100 ha) to 85 acres (34 ha). The revised proposal included traffic segregation measures designed to prevent lost tourists from wandering onto Port of Long Beach property, and would not decrease the overall size of the resort. In order to avoid the recreational use restriction, the land created by new fill would be used by the oceanographic research institute and port use; the DisneySea theme park would be moved onto existing Port-side land and reconfigured to fit within the land freed up by moving the Queen Mary to the cruise ship terminal and relocating (or closing) existing harbor offices and businesses. At the same time, the Port Disney project was renamed to DisneySea, as some foreign customers of the Port of Long Beach thought the project included renaming the entire Port of Long Beach to Port Disney.

=== Cancellation ===
A decision on whether to proceed with the Port Disney project was scheduled to be made by January 1992. The mayor of Long Beach cited the issues with SB 1062, stating that he "just [doesn't] think it makes as much economic sense for Disney or the city now", in November 1991, and the Port Disney project was canceled in favor of the WestCOT project in December 1991. In announcing the decision, Disney officials cited the cost of regulatory review involving 27 different government agencies on the federal, state and local levels, which could cost up to US$70,000,000 (equivalent to $161,600,000 in 2024).

According to former Disney cast members, the company abandoned the idea mainly due to its significant financial problems caused by the EuroDisney Project (the cost of the construction and operation of the marina was an estimated $1 billion at the time) which ultimately led to the cancellation of the Port Disney and the planned Disney WestCOT Project in Anaheim. David Malmuth later stated "It was really my inability to muster the support that I needed within the Walt Disney Company" that led to the selection of the Anaheim proposal. City of Long Beach employees say that it was abandoned because the city did not agree to make expensive improvements to the Long Beach Freeway and other roads leading to the development site as requested by Disney.

== See also ==
- List of never built Disney attractions
