= Walt Disney's Riverfront Square =

Cancelled Disney theme park

- Location: St. Louis, Missouri, U.S.
- Opened: Cancelled
- Operated by: The Walt Disney Company

Walt Disney's Riverfront Square was a planned theme park in St. Louis, Missouri that would have been the second Disney park, after Disneyland. The park was in development between 1963 and 1965.

== History ==
After the construction of Disneyland, Walt Disney publicly stated that he had no intentions of opening parks elsewhere. However, in March 1963, Disney met with the mayor of St. Louis to discuss plans for the construction of a new theme park in the riverfront area of St. Louis, which was undergoing a major redevelopment for the city's bicentennial. The park would have stood in the two city blocks north of Busch Memorial Stadium, which was under construction at the same time. Disney had Imagineering draw up plans and design new attractions for the park.

For several reasons, plans for the park fell through. Disney may have been insulted after August Busch Jr. publicly called him crazy for thinking his park would succeed without selling beer. By July 1965, Disney announced that plans for the park would not move forward, because of a dispute over the financing and ownership of the park, and Disney's desire to focus his attentions on Florida for what would become the construction of Walt Disney World.

== Proposed plans ==
Riverfront Square was to be the second Disney park after Disneyland, and would have attractions and features that were present at Disneyland. The costs for the park were projected at $40 million, with a targeted attendance of 25,000 visitors per day.

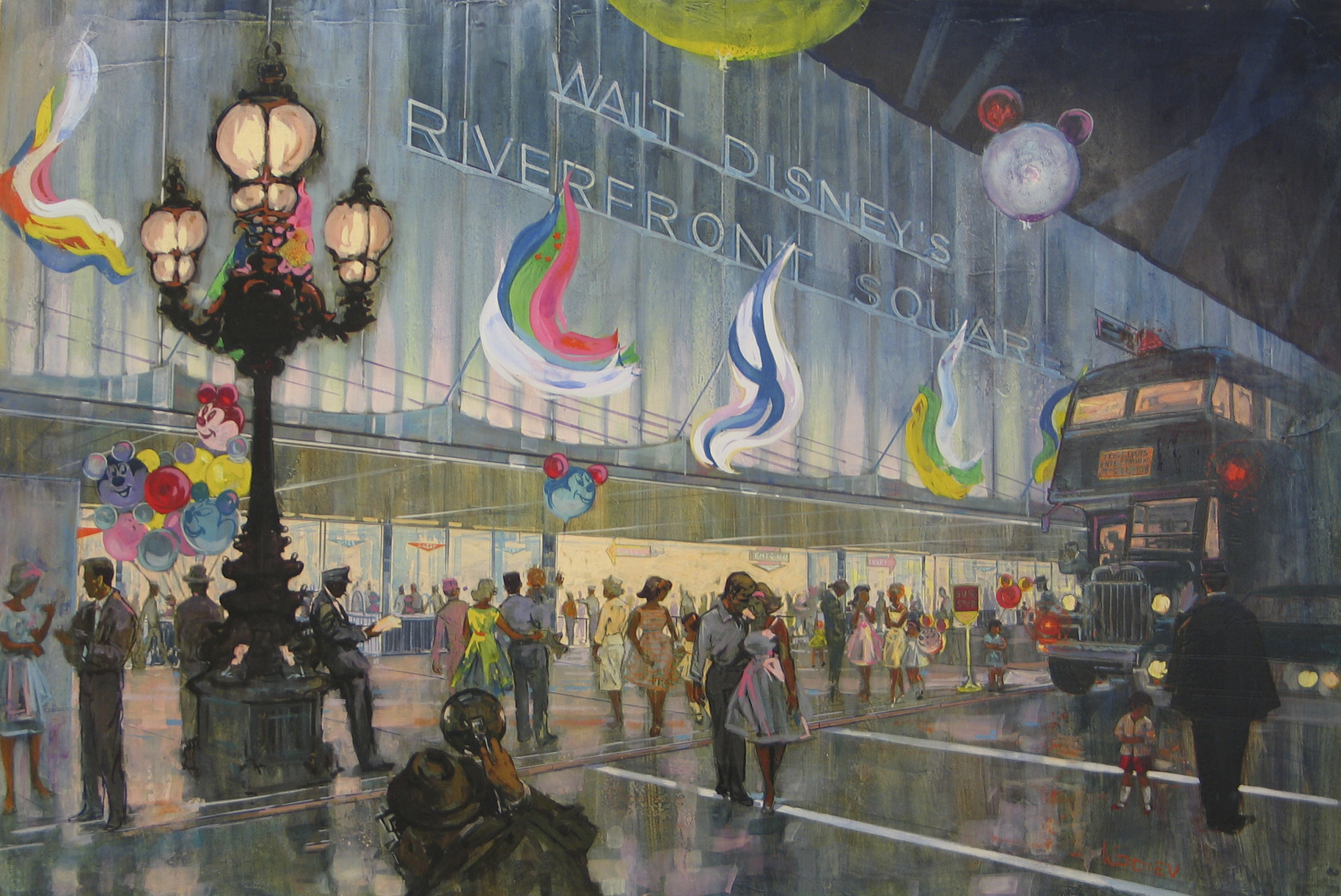
Building facade concept

The entrance to the park would have been similar to Disneyland's Main Street, U.S.A., with one side of the street based on Old St. Louis, and the other based on Old New Orleans. Disney planned to utilize the Audio-Animatronic technology that had recently been developed by his company for the New York World's Fair. The top floor of the park would have housed a banquet hall, restaurant, lounge, and bar, overlooking the Mississippi River, in addition to having concession stands and shops throughout the park. Several classic Disneyland and Disney World attractions were originally conceived for the St. Louis park, including what would later become Pirates of the Caribbean, the Haunted Mansion, and a "Western Riverboat" ride, whose design was later incorporated into Big Thunder Mountain Railroad.

Other planned attractions included:

- Lewis & Clark Adventure, a ride based on the travels of the Lewis and Clark Expedition.
- A ride based on folk legend Mike Fink.
- A New Orleans Square based on the one currently located at Disneyland.
- The Pirates of the Caribbean attraction, complete with the Blue Bayou restaurant
- A ride based on folk legend Davy Crockett.
- An attraction based on the Meramec Caverns of Missouri.
- Two Circarama theaters, at least one of which would show a film about St. Louis.
- An aviary-type exhibit.
- An explorable pirate ship.
- An opera house.
- Dark rides based on Peter Pan, Snow White, and Pinocchio which are now all found at Disneyland in California.
- A wishing well.

== See also ==
- List of Disney attractions that were never built
- Downtown St. Louis
