= Phantom Manor =

Dark ride attraction at Disneyland Park Paris

- Exterior of Phantom Manor in 2019

Disneyland Park (Paris)
- Area: Frontierland
- Status: Operating
- Opening date: April 12, 1992; 34 years ago

Ride statistics
- Attraction type: Omnimover, dark ride, Haunted attraction
- Manufacturer: Vekoma
- Designer: Walt Disney Imagineering
- Theme: Haunted attraction
- Music: Grim Grinning Ghosts (Buddy Baker, Xavier Atencio, John Debney)
- Length: 785 ft (239 m)
- Vehicle type: Omnimovers
- Riders per vehicle: 1 to 3
- Duration: 6 minutes
- Hosted by: Gérard Chevalier as The Phantom (1992–2018) (French Version); Bernard Alane as The Phantom (2019-pres) (French Version); Vincent Price as The Phantom (English Version)
- Audio-Animatronics: 92
- Website: Disneyland Paris – Phantom Manor
- Must transfer from wheelchair

Phantom Manor is a dark ride attraction in Frontierland at Disneyland Park in Disneyland Paris. Phantom Manor is the park's version of The Haunted Mansion attractions at Disneyland, Magic Kingdom and Tokyo Disneyland, although it is designed to be darker in tone compared to other Haunted Mansion rides. It opened with Euro Disneyland on April 12, 1992. The attraction combines a walk-through portion with Omnimover vehicles and features special effects and Audio-Animatronics. This version of the ride has a distinct plot, compared to the largely ambiguous story lines of the other Haunted Mansion attractions in Disney parks. The ride also features a unique orchestral soundtrack, differing from the American and Japanese versions.

== History ==
While planning Euro Disneyland, Tony Baxter, executive designer for Walt Disney Imagineering, decided that certain staple Disney attractions would likely have to be modified to fit the altered tastes and preferences of a European audience. The Haunted Mansion was among these, and the Imagineers saw the new iteration of the ride as an opportunity to expand and build on past ideas. Jeff Burke was assigned the role of executive producer for the construction of this park's version of Frontierland and, with help from Imagineer Bob Baranick and show writer Craig Fleming, it was decided that the story related to Phantom Manor would have to be congruent with that of Thunder Mesa, the fictional town portrayed in Frontierland. A similar treatment was given to the Paris version of Big Thunder Mountain Railroad.

A major influence for the story of the ride was Gaston Leroux's novel, The Phantom of the Opera, the secondary plot focusing on the abandoned bride Miss Havisham from Charles Dickens' Great Expectations, as well as many European Gothic legends, which were altered for a Western setting.

The architecture is in the Second Empire style. Inspiration for Paris's Frontierland architecture was provided by historic buildings in Virginia City, Nevada, specifically the Fourth Ward School for Phantom Manor.

== Story ==
=== Original version (1992–2018) ===
Phantom Manor in 2013, prior to the refurbishment

Henry Ravenswood (born 1795) was a Western settler who struck gold in Big Thunder Mountain and founded the Thunder Mesa Mining Company, thus creating the city of Thunder Mesa (Frontierland as a whole). Ravenswood became rich and built himself a Victorian manor high on Boot Hill overlooking Big Thunder Mountain, where he lived with his wife Martha (born 1802) and his daughter, Melanie Ravenswood (born 1842).

Big Thunder Mountain was rumored by natives to be home to the Thunder Bird, a powerful spirit possessing a treasure. According to the legend, its wrath could be materialized into a terrible earthquake. However, Ravenswood would not believe such stories. Years went by and the gold in Big Thunder Mountain became scarce, making miners dig deeper into the mountain.

Melanie grew from a young girl into a young woman and became engaged to a train engineer named Jake who planned to take her far away from Thunder Mesa, much to the dismay of Henry. Henry did everything he could to stop this, but his useless attempts to stop Melanie were put to a stop when a terrible earthquake killed him and Martha. It seemed the Thunder Bird had been awakened and the family was never heard of again. After several years, the story of what really happened came out from underneath the rubble:

On Melanie's wedding day, a mysterious Phantom unknown to anyone appeared in the house. While Melanie was preparing in her room, The Phantom lured Jake up to the attic where he hanged him by the neck from the rafters.

In the ballroom, the bride sat alone. Hours went by with no sign of the groom. Guests slowly filed away, leaving Melanie alone in the house with the staff of maids and butlers. And so, having never taken off her wedding dress or dropped her flower bouquet, in preparation for her loved one's return, she wandered the house aimlessly, singing melancholy songs of lost love.

But the phantom was still in the house, laughing at Melanie's human devotion to her intended husband. One after one, he invited his dead, demonic friends from the afterlife to fill the house in an eternal party. A dark curse fell upon the house and the shape of the house was slowly transformed by the evil forces. No one ever set foot in the house ever since.

Inside and outside, the house was decaying with age. Dusty cobwebs covered every inch, the disheartened staff not caring, for it was rumored that Melanie had lost her mind. She wandered the house for years and years, singing softly to her groom, while all around her demons and ghosts reveled and danced. Everywhere she went she was reminded of the wedding. The Phantom’s eternal laughter still carried through the walls of the house. Outside, the once beautiful grounds were falling apart and crumbling. The gilded staircase and structure were dotted with mold and trees and every plant on the grounds died. As if sensing the evil inherent in the house, nothing living ever trod there. Even so, Melanie kept her hopes, waiting for her love's return and never figured why he didn't show up at the wedding.

The earthquake that killed Henry and Martha all those years ago cut a huge gouge in the west half of the property and in the crumbling ghost town of the old Thunder Mesa. The deserted buildings were rumored to be called Phantom Canyon, the dark supernatural version of the town and anyone who entered the ghastly old town at night never came back.

Today, no one knows if Melanie Ravenswood is still alive in that old house on the hill. If she is, then she is well over 100 years old. Her voice still carries over the town at night though, through the walls of the house and night air. And sometimes, people still see lights in the house.

According to local legend, unexplained sounds, including crying, laughter, and the sound of breaking glass, have been associated with the mansion on nights when the moon is full. The story further claims that Melanie's spirit remains at the mansion, where she is said to continue waiting for her groom.

Nobody knows the true identity of the phantom. Some speculate that it is the ghost of Henry Ravenswood trying to prevent Melanie’s wedding and keep her imprisoned for her disobedience. Others say it is the wrath of the Thunder Bird sent to punish Melanie for her father’s sins.

=== New version (2019–) ===
For the 2019 refurbishment, the story was slightly revised in addition to the new effects which include:

- The confirmation that the Phantom was indeed Henry Ravenswood, who vowed that no one would marry his daughter no matter what, using various means, including direct murder. (Previously, the Phantom's identity was left ambiguous pre 2019 refurb, on whether or not it was really him or some evil presence that awakened from the earthquake that killed him and his wife, and collapsed the mines inside of Big Thunder Mountain.)
- Instead of simply Jake, Melanie had a variety of suitors (Barry Claude, Sawyer Bottom, Captain Rowan D. Falls, and Ignatius "Iggy" Knight), who all were killed in various accidents implied to be staged by the Phantom, just before or after they married his daughter.
- Melanie becoming aware of the phantom that terrorized and killed all her potential husbands (implied via the changes to the ride post 2019 refurb, although it is still ambiguous if she came to realize if it was her father or if she knew it was her father from the start), before outright being driven mad in the process and resulting in her complete allegiance to the Phantom after her death, with her spirit offering to marry riders at the climax in the new version of the ride.

== Attraction ==
Like the Haunted Mansions located in other Disney parks, only the introduction of the ride (the Octagonal Portrait Gallery) takes place in the visible Manor façade. The actual ride itself takes place in a large warehouse-style show building hidden behind the Manor.

Phantom Manor's Omnimover portion is similar to the Disneyland Haunted Mansion's system. The track layouts of both are almost identical, but not completely. The main difference is that Phantom Manor's track is slightly longer, primarily to accommodate the Phantom Canyon scenes that substitute for the graveyard scenes in the other rides. Many scenes from the classic Haunted Mansions - such as the Octagonal Portrait Gallery, the Portrait Corridor, the Endless Hallway, the Conservatory, the Corridor of Doors, Madame Leota's Seance Room, the Ballroom, and even the busts singing Grim Grinning Ghosts - are replicated but altered to incorporate the new Western theme and plot.

=== Outside queue ===
In the original Haunted Mansions at Disneyland, the Magic Kingdom and Tokyo Disneyland, the mansion was designed to look clean and aesthetically pleasing. Phantom Manor, however, is designed to look clearly derelict and stands at the top of a small hill, looking out onto the southern side of Big Thunder Mountain, with a commanding view of the washed out trestle, the mine elevator, and the second lift hill. The Manor's grounds are untended, overgrown with weeds and scattered with dead vegetation.

Upon entering the grounds, guests can see a bat guard box and a plaque on the wall which reads Phantom Manor – Non Omnis Moriar (Latin for "I shall not die completely"). A derelict gazebo stands on the lawn that has a tea set laid out. At night, the light in the gazebo flickers. The gazebo also contains a music box playing within (since 2001, this music box track is also used in Disneyland's version for use on the annual seasonal overlay). This is also the only mansion in any of the parks that has guests enter the ride through the front door. Shadows and lights can be seen from within the house at nighttime. Melanie can also be seen from a window in the façade.

=== The Foyer ===
Guests walk up the pathways towards the Manor, along the porch and queue outside the house where they wait for admission. A cast member dressed as a macabre servant opens the doors and invites a small group of them into the foyer.

==== Original version (1992–2018) ====
The foyer contains a dusty chandelier and two mirrors, and is lined with dark wood panelling. The voice of the Phantom sounds from the ceiling and around the room, politely welcoming guests, telling them the legend of the manor and inviting them to explore the place further. Melanie's face fades in and out of the smallest mirror during the narration.

==== New version (2019–present) ====
In the 2019 refurbishment, an additional effect was added to the foyer. The small mirror was replaced by a painting of Melanie in her wedding gown, looking sad, and her father Henry Ravenswood, looking angry, standing behind her outside the decrepit house with both hands on her shoulders. A bare tree is also behind them with four hearts crossed out and a noose hanging from one of its branches. As the Phantom begins recounting the legend of the Manor, the painting changes. It now shows a happier Melanie, dressed in summer clothes, while Henry is smiling and resting one hand on Melanie's shoulder. The Manor is in pristine condition, and the tree, now with leaves, has one heart and a swing hanging from its branches. Lighting effects also transform the wallpaper in the room from old and torn to brand-new.

The Phantom was originally voiced by Vincent Price, but legal agreements required the narration to be primarily in French. Within a few months after the attraction first opened, writer and dub voice actor Gérard Chevalier was brought in to record a French version of Price's narration. However, a small piece of Price's recording was kept in use: the Phantom's maniacal laughter.

As part of the refurbishment, parts of Price's narration were restored to the ride's soundtrack. The new tracks feature Price once again, original excerpts as well as previously unused material from his 1990 recording, spoken English, with French actor Bernard Alane voicing the parts in French. The Phantom says (French lines in italics, translated into English below):

"When hinges creak in doorless chambers, when strange and frightening sounds are heard all around, when candlelight flickers though the air is deathly still, that is the time when the Phantom manifests. Welcome curious friends, it is so nice to have guests. We welcome you, humble mortals, to this mysterious manor. You may not believe it but beauty once lived in this house. Phantom Manor had happier days, but times have changed. And now curious souls, come, I have more to show you. Enter brave mortals into this famous manor together."

=== Octagonal Portrait Gallery ===
Guests then enter an octagonal room with four portraits of a young Melanie, with each of her four suitors. Melanie is with Barry Claude in one portrait, Sawyer Bottom in the second, Captain Rowan D. Falls in the third, and Ignatius "Iggy" Knight in the fourth. The Phantom comments on the gallery, referring to the "sweet innocence of youth". Shortly after, Melanie fades away from each of the paintings, with only the suitors left and the Phantom acknowledges a "disquieting metamorphosis" and that "not all tales have happy endings".

Suddenly the room appears to stretch upwards and the paintings grow taller, revealing the fates of each of Melanie's suitors:

- Barry Claude sitting on a tree branch, while an angry bear with her cub roars down below.
- Sawyer Bottom straddling a log and being sawed in half by an industrial buzzsaw.
- Rowan D. Falls riding in a rowboat about to head over a waterfall.
- Ignatius Knight standing atop several crates of TNT and an ignited barrel of dynamite.

The Phantom comments "It appears everyone is doomed at Phantom Manor. Even you." He goes on to add that the chamber has no windows and no doors, offering the guests a "chilling challenge": to find a way out. After his maniacal laughter echoes away, he adds that "the Phantom" (referring to himself) would be happy to help them — lightning and thunder effects fill the space as the ceiling turns invisible and the Phantom reveals himself in the attic, holding a noose and sinisterly laughing. Then suddenly, lights go out completely and the guests are shrouded in darkness. The gallery's lights slowly come back on and a hidden door opens, revealing a hallway lined with portraits. The Phantom apologizes for frightening the guests prematurely and beckons them further into the Manor, and states that "the real beauty of this house awaits us, farther on, and she's dying to meet you, but beware of the Phantom" (once again referencing himself).

Prior to the refurbishment, the four portraits depicted a young Melanie, pictured in more felicitous times, only to stretch to reveal more macabre situations:

- Melanie is having a picnic with her fiancé Jake Evans as ants, a diamondback rattlesnake, a scorpion, a tarantula and a beetle raid their food.
- Melanie holds a parasol as she rides in a boat about to go over a waterfall.
- Melanie picks roses from above a tombstone while a skeletal zombie emerges from the ground, gripping a small rake in one hand.
- Melanie wades through a small stream as an aquatic monster reaches for her foot.

The scene revealed in the attic was also slightly different until 2018; instead of just showing the Phantom evilly laughing, he was hanging Jake Evans, Melanie's sole groom in the original version of the attraction.

Like in the Disneyland Haunted Mansion, the Octagonal Portrait Gallery is actually a pair of cleverly disguised OTIS elevators. These elevators were originally created to solve a space constraint in Disneyland, as the Imagineers building the ride had to figure out a way to subtly funnel guests underneath the Disneyland Railroad that sat directly behind the ride's exterior. The floor is lowered while the upper half of the walls are also lowered at half the speed to create the stretching illusion. This served a double purpose of both a dramatic effect, while also lowering guests from the elevation of the attraction façade to the elevation of the ride's loading area in a separate warehouse-style show building behind the berm of the park. The Tokyo and Florida versions of the attraction did not face the same issues regarding space, and thus were constructed with stretching rooms that only stretch upward while guests remain at the same level. Despite Phantom Manor also not facing these spatial issues, the decision was made to use actual elevators for the stretching show scenes in the ride similarly to California's attraction. This was likely done because the façade of the manor is elevated and without the elevator functionality the show building would be visible to guests around the manor and those riding Big Thunder Mountain.

The ceiling at the top of the room is actually a scrim, which conceals the Phantom until he is backlit from above.

=== Interior queue and loading area ===
Stepping out of the Stretching Room, guests walk down the Portrait Corridor, which takes them from the Manor visible from within the park into the show building that houses the actual ride. Unlike the Disneyland Haunted Mansion, this corridor does not pass under the park's railroad (which instead travels behind the show building). As the guests walk down the corridor, they see four portraits, slowly morphing into more macabre images.

The original paintings were all adapted from the Disneyland ride, based on the opening day versions of the paintings in said attraction:

- A knight and his horse on a cliff both becoming ghosts and the sky darkening.
- A young woman in a Greek temple turning into a stone gorgon in the temple's ruins.
- A ship sailing across the sea becomes a tattered and ghostly version of itself sailing through a storm.
- A woman reclining on a sofa turns into a were-panther.

During the ride's 2019 refurbishment, Imagineers decided that the original paintings did not fit with the more serious tone of the attraction, and changed them to better convey the story of the ride. The four paintings were replaced with:

- Henry Ravenswood becoming the Phantom (replacing Medusa).
- The Flying Dutchman as seen in Pirates of the Caribbean catching on fire (replacing the original version of the ship).
- Henry and another man outside the Manor about to have a duel, with it changing to Henry shooting his opponent in the back (replacing the were-panther). This portrait is a reference to the duelist-painting ghosts in the Disneyland attraction's ballroom scene.
- A cowboy and his horse on a cliff becoming ghosts with the sky darkening and ghost buffaloes appearing in the sky (replacing the knight).

At the end of the hallway stands a large portrait of Melanie Ravenswood, wearing her bridal gown, from which she can be heard singing. Although subtle, the refurb added a faint figure of Henry standing behind Melanie in this painting. It is unknown if this was intended to be an animated effect like the rest of the portraits, or if it was just added for more observant guests to find.

Guests then turn a corner and enter the loading area, a large hall with the Grand Staircase leading to the upper floor. One can see a ghostly, foggy landscape with flashes and bolts of lightning through the huge window above the stairs, and Melanie standing on the midway landing. Old furniture lines the walls, and sitting on a shelf is a marble bust of a stern-looking woman, who stares at guests and seems to follow them as they pass by. This is accomplished using the hollow face illusion, and the effect is a commonality between every version of the attraction in the different Disney parks. An unbroken train of black Omnimover vehicles known as "carriages" move through the center of the room, alongside a moving platform to enable easy loading.

Unlike the American versions of the attraction, the loading area is the last scene with narration from the Phantom. The Imagineers chose to convey much of the story visually, and were hesitant to rely on narration throughout the entire ride because of possible language barriers.

=== The ride ===
Guests board the carriages, each accommodating two to three persons and then move upwards to the show building's main floor. Prior to 2019, guests would pass a young Melanie bowing while holding a candelabra and singing the entire time. During the renovations, Melanie was moved to the loading area and now a twitching suit of armor is in her place (a reference to when California's Haunted Mansion had live actors in a knight costumes scare guests for several weeks after the 1969 opening).

After passing the armor the guests face a seemingly Endless Hallway, with the vision of Melanie and the Phantom appearing and disappearing in the distance while the candelabra that she is holding remains in view. The hallway effect is accomplished with a full-length mirror on the far end of the hallway, and the disappearance of Melanie and the Phantom is done utilizing the pepper's ghost effect.

On the left side of the Corridor is a Conservatory containing a piano, adorned with the wreaths of the deceased suitors. At first glance, it seems to be playing a minor chord version of "The Wedding March" by itself, but one can notice a ghost pianist's shadow falling on the carpet (this effect is achieved by the use of mechanical keys). A large, red-eyed raven sits on a music stand next to the piano and squawks madly.

The carriages then travel through a corridor lined with doors. As guests pass each door, they hear pounding, knocking, or shouting behind it, and the knockers seem to move by themselves, as if their inhabitants are struggling to get out. When the last door is reached, guests can see two skeletal hands clutching at the top, trying to force their way through, with the skeleton yelling "Let me out of here!" (It uses the same audio as the skeleton attempting to escape his coffin in the Conservatory in other Haunted Mansions). The carriages pass a small hall containing a demonic grandfather clock, with a large "13" on its face (instead of the usual 12) and its hands spinning backward as it chimes. The walls are lined with purple wallpaper covered in eyes, several of which glow in the dark as the guests move between the hallway and the next scene.

The carriages then enter a round Seance Room adorned with gargoyles, where a crystal ball sits on a floating central table. The ball contains the head of Madame Leota. Behind her is a raven perched on a chair. As the ride vehicles revolve around her, she summons ghosts and dark creatures to a wedding party in both English and French (translated in English below):

"Goblins and Ghoulies, creatures of fright, we summon you now, to dance through the night! Spirits and ghosts, on your proud stallions, accompany the beautiful bride through the night! Warlocks and Witches, answer this call! Your presence is wanted at this ghostly ball! From the twelve knolls of midnight to the morning bells, we shall waltz together, gruesome debutante! Join now the Spirits in Nuptial Doom, a ravishing Bride, a vanishing Groom..."

The narration in this scene is entirely separate from that of the original attraction, although retaining the ghostly séance aspect. During the 2019 refurb, the scene received a new effect that saw Madame Leota's crystal ball floating above the table. The original score for this scene was replaced with the score from the American versions of the attraction, although it was changed back shortly afterward after fans voiced their displeasure with the change.

Guests leave the Seance Room and move along a balcony, looking down into the Ballroom, where a ghostly wedding party takes place. Melanie stands on a staircase, singing while the Phantom stands behind her, laughing at her as lightning flashes behind him. Ghostly guests enter the room, bringing in wedding presents, and sitting around the dining table, where a moldy wedding cake is waiting for them. Drunken ghosts swing from the chandelier above the table. Elegantly dressed pairs of ghostly dancers twirl around the Ballroom, as a spirit organist sits at a massive organ, playing a haunting waltz as wraiths fly out of its pipes. Apart from plot-related retheming, this scene is similar to the regular Haunted Mansions' ballrooms. During soft-opening previews after the 2019 refurbishment, the music here was temporarily replaced with the equivalent music from the American Haunted Mansions, but was switched back after backlash similarly to the previous Séance scene. The transparent effects of ghosts in this scene is accomplished with the pepper's ghost effect, with animatronics above and below the ride vehicles reflected in mirrors to create the illusion of transparency.

Leaving the Ballroom, the vehicles enter the Bride's Boudoir (which replaces the attic scene in the original attraction). A dying fire is crackling in the fireplace. Guests then see Melanie who has given up looking for her long lost groom. Melanie sits weeping into a mirror as an old woman while her father's skeletal face can be seen over her shoulder in the reflection. A music box and gramophone play in the background. Prior to 2019 the scene was largely the same, but the mirror was fogged and damaged to resemble an actual skull, in reference to the Charles Allan Gilbert painting All is Vanity. The clock displayed in the room has a blade pendulum, in reference to Edgar Allan Poe's "The Pit and the Pendulum," which was also the basis for a movie featuring Vincent Price.

The carriages leave the Bride's Boudoir through open double doors and glide across a terrace and then into a stormy graveyard, past an animatronic of the Phantom with a shovel standing before an open grave, with an undead dog growling beside him. The Phantom laughs as the guests pass by. The carriages then travel underground to the catacombs (presumably Boot Hill), passing by fissures in the ground as a reference to the earthquake that resulted in the death of Henry Ravenswood. A series of coffins being opened by their skeletal residents are seen, as well as a pair of skeleton hands attempting to pry open a coffin from the inside, typically found in the conservatory scene in the Haunted Mansion. A set of Singing Busts then come into view, singing the original Grim Grinning Ghosts from the Haunted Mansion. For unknown reasons, the singing bust originally portrayed by Chuck Schroeder was removed from Phantom Manor, leaving only four.

Through a hole, the carriages then enter Phantom Canyon, which is a twisted, supernatural version of Thunder Mesa. Great rifts in the earth surrounding the vehicles again convey damage from the previous earthquake, which marked Thunder Mesa's turning point from a prosperous community to a ghost town. An animatronic ticket master (using the same mold as Ezra, one of the original Hitchhiking Ghosts from the American rides) stands before a ramshackle train station, offering the riders train tickets to the Underworld. Guests then pass a ruined town hall where the mayor (who speaks clips of dialogue from Paul Frees, the original rides' Ghost Host, and who is modeled from the same mold as animatronics of Dreamfinder from the original version of Epcot's Journey into Imagination with Figment) holds the Key to the City and invites guests to be the Manor's 1000th ghost, "but beware of hitchhiking ghosts!" As he tips his hat, his head comes with it. A shootout follows between a bank robber fleeing on a mule and a cowardly sheriff, with Big Thunder Mountain in the background. Guests see a pharmacy where a green-faced pharmacist drinks a potion of some sort, followed by a saloon whose front wall has caved in. Inside it, there is a dancing showgirl, a bartender and a man playing a honky-tonk piano. Every once in a while, a hand with a candelabra appears out of the piano. Four invisible gambler figures play poker nearby.

Much of Phantom Canyon was derived from a planned scene of a wild mining town called Dry Gulch in the Western River Expedition at the Magic Kingdom, later retooled into their version of Big Thunder Mountain Railroad. Phantom Canyon occupies a space that in the regular Haunted Mansions is used for the graveyard scene.

Another cackling figure of the Phantom and his raven stands by a tree and gestures towards a noose hanging on a branch and an empty coffin for awaiting guests, his eyes glowing red at passing riders. Prior to 2019, this animatronic version of the Phantom was a skeleton with rotting flesh on his body, showing the guests that he has lost any humanity he's ever had left in him. As guests see the silhouette of the Manor above, they enter the mausoleum, where Melanie's four suitors were buried. Prior to the 2019 refurb, guests would encounter Melanie's floating skeleton pointing the way out. After the refurb, the skeletal hand of one of her suitors holds a wedding ring out as guests pass by. The vehicles enter a subterranean chamber lined with large, gilt-framed mirrors in which the ghostly image of Melanie, driven insane by the loss of her suitors and groom, appears in the vehicles, beckoning riders to wed her. Vehicles travel through a wine cellar, where cast members await to help them disembark their carriages and exit the attraction.

=== Post show ===
As guests travel towards daylight, the evil laughter of the Phantom can be heard, as well as Melanie's voice, telling guests to "hurry back" and to "bring their death certificates". Prior to 2019, a small Melanie would beckon guests to hurry back. This figure was removed in the ride's 2019 refurbishment. Finally, guests exit into Boot Hill, a cemetery filled with humorous gravestones, as well as ride-oriented gravestones for the Ravenswoods and several others. If one should turn around to look back at the house, they can occasionally see the Phantom looking out the window over the exit and down at them, before he closes the curtains. The effect is more visible at night due to backlighting. In the Cemetery, one can hear Melanie's beating heart in her tomb, both a reference to the original Haunted Mansion bride, whose red beating heart could be seen through her chest and Edgar Allan Poe's The Tell-Tale Heart.

== Soundtrack ==
An opening narration by Vincent Price was recorded and initially used. However, due to a deal with French officials, the attraction's audio had to be primarily in French; thus the narration was rerecorded by Gérard Chevalier, who had provided a dubbed French voice for Price in some of his movies. Price's narration is available on the CD The Haunted Mansion - 30th Anniversary (1999 CD). Parts of Price's original narration in English were restored to the soundtrack in 2019, including excerpts previously unused in the attraction.

The attraction features an orchestrated score by John Debney. Although it is based on Buddy Baker's Grim Grinning Ghosts, it provides the attraction with a cinematic feeling, along with giving it a darker, more romantic tone. In the climactic Phantom Canyon scene, a big-band-style swing version of "Grim Grinning Ghosts" is heard, compared to the original version's "spirited" but straight meter.

== Other information ==
In the early 2000s, Phantom Manor was given a special Halloween celebration. Known as The Phantom Wedding, it featured a large scrim covering the whole building, which was used for projection of Melanie's recreated wedding. In 2005, however, this celebration was replaced by another.

On January 8, 2018, Phantom Manor closed for refurbishment. The graveyard has remained relatively untouched, though the walkway and manor itself were covered in scaffolding. At the FanDaze event at Walt Disney Studios Park on June 2, Imagineer Tom Fitzgerald confirmed that Vincent Price's original English dialogue would return to Phantom Manor following its refurbishment. The ride soft-reopened on April 30, 2019, and fully reopened on May 3.

== Incidents ==
During the morning of April 2, 2016, the body of a 45-year-old cast member was found inside the attraction. He had been working on lighting backstage, and his death was understood to have been accidental and due to electrocution. The ride was closed during the investigation.

== See also ==
- Mystic Manor
