= Marriott's Great America (Maryland–Virginia) =

Canceled attraction in the eastern US

- Interactive map of Marriott's Great America
- Location: Laurel, Maryland and Manassas, Virginia, United States
- Coordinates: 38°48′18″N 77°34′15″W
- Status: Cancelled
- Owner: Marriott Corporation

Marriott's Great America was a proposed amusement park and resort planned for two separate locations in the Baltimore–Washington metropolitan area in the early 1970s, with an intended opening date of 1976. The Marriott Corporation hoped the park would become the centerpiece of its Great America theme park chain, alongside its parks in Gurnee, Illinois (now Six Flags Great America) and Santa Clara, California (now California's Great America). Marriott encountered heavy opposition at both sites where it intended to build, Savage, Maryland, and Manassas, Virginia, which led the company to abandon their development plans. The company later revived the concept for a site in Guilford, Maryland, but an eventual loss of enthusiasm led to that project's cancellation in 1980.

== First Maryland proposal ==
In the early 1970s, the Marriott Corporation, owner of several restaurant chains as well as Marriott hotels, sought to branch further out into the tourism and vacation industry. The largest of the projects it took on was a chain of state-of-the-art theme parks, each of which would be called "Marriott's Great America" and themed around American history, opening in time for the bicentennial of 1976. From the beginning, three parks were planned, as Marriott identified three underserved metropolitan areas that could support a major amusement park: Baltimore–Washington, the San Francisco Bay Area, and Chicago-Milwaukee.

Early in the planning process, Marriott's Theme Park Group decided that the area around Washington, D.C. would be the most promising of the three, because as the nation's capital it would be most appropriate for a park based on American history, and because it would be near their corporate headquarters in Bethesda, Maryland. Over 130 potential sites in the metropolitan area were considered, and ultimately a site was chosen at the intersection of I-95 and the Patuxent Freeway in the town of Savage, Maryland, near the city of Laurel and the planned community of Columbia. Marriott acquired 850 acres of land at this site in 1971, which had previously been owned by The Rouse Company, a major landowner in the area.

As the flagship in the chain, Marriott planned a major multi-park development "on the order of the Disney amusement parks" for the Maryland site. In addition to the American-themed amusement park, the area would feature a 200-acre safari park with amphitheaters for trained animal shows and a marine mammal park with a 2,400-seat theater for performances. Later additions to the complex would include a shopping center, a campground, and a Marriott hotel.

The layout of the theme park, like its successfully built sister locations in California and Illinois, was designed by Randall Duell and Associates. Duell was a veteran theme park designer, and for the three Great America parks he set out to create his greatest design yet. With an overarching Americana theme in mind, Marriott's designers traveled across the country, observing styles and collecting artifacts to help inform an authentic atmosphere. All three were extremely similar, with the same themes in different areas, all arranged in a "Duell loop" that wound around the park. The themed areas would have included all six of those that appeared at the other parks:

- Carousel Plaza, the front of the park, centered around an ornate double-decker carousel,
- Hometown Square, based on early 20th-century small towns of the Midwest,
- The Great Midwest Livestock Exposition at County Fair, with its early 20th century rural county fair,
- Yukon Territory, resembling a logging camp in the Canadian Yukon or Alaska, and
- Yankee Harbor, a 19th-century New England port inspired by Cape Cod,
- Orleans Place, modeled after the French Quarter of New Orleans.

Additionally, two further areas were planned because of the larger area allotted: The Great Southwest, which would later be planned as an annex at the Gurnee park, and an unnamed area based on the antebellum South.

The plan was announced on January 26, 1972, at a press conference with then-Governor Marvin Mandel and Marriott CEO J. Willard Marriott, Jr. Construction was slated to begin in the summer of that year, after and the park was expected to be finished in time for the 1975 operating season. Local and state governments were enthusiastic about the proposal, which promised to bring over a billion dollars in revenue to the local economy and create 3,500 jobs.

Some local residents, however, were much more pessimistic about the impact of the park on Howard County. Columbia Residents Against the Marriott Proposal, a citizens' group that was abbreviated as CRAMP, was one of the earliest opponents to the park, citing concerns of unwanted traffic and tourism, as well as potential environmental impacts and the feeling that the park was being "shoved on them" by the enthusiastic state government. Other local groups, such as the Emmanuel United Methodist Church in Laurel, echoed these concerns in interviews with local reporters and at county zoning board meetings.

Marriott's plan was dependent on the creation of a new type of zone, an "entertainment center" zone, in Howard County. Hearings at the County Zoning Board began in June and continued throughout the summer of 1972. Marriott warned the board that it was looking at several other possible sites, and if their plan was rejected they would go elsewhere. Opponents argued that in addition to the problems cited by citizens' groups, the complex would create a monopoly on services and local business would not see any economic benefit. Testimony from residents of other areas where major theme parks had been built, particularly Orlando, Florida, was sought out by both sides. The plan was officially rejected on September 21, with the board stating in a unanimous 5-0 decision that it would reject any such theme park in Howard County for the same reasons.

== Virginia proposal ==
Despite appeals from some local residents, including a group called Citizens Happy About Marriott Park or CHAMP, the company sold the plot and moved on, searching for another location in the region. Marriott set its sights on a smaller, 540-acre plot at the intersection of Interstate 66 and Virginia State Route 234 in Manassas, Virginia. The new proposal did not include the safari park or the marine park, but the theme park was still to be larger than the other two Great Americas. The chosen site was located directly next to Manassas National Battlefield Park, which Marriott officials stated was not known to them until after it was selected. Despite some concerns about the sewage capacity of the area, the Prince William County Board of Supervisors agreed to begin the approval process in February 1973. Within days, the Six Flags chain was said to be considering a location closer to Baltimore, while Howard County residents who had previously opposed the park in Maryland offered their support to the mounting local criticism in Virginia.

After plans were announced, Marriott's team became aware of the proximity of the battlefield site and initially decided that neither park would have a significant effect on the other. David L. Brown, vice president of the Theme Park Group, stated that Marriott had "felt that if there were any effect, it would be an effect to the extent that the Battlefield Park would probably have an increase in attendance." Soon afterward, the company reached out to the National Park Service to discuss the project's potential impact. Brown wrote to Charles Marshall, director of the Park Service's Virginia State Office, to assure him that there would be no negative effect. The Park Service was already aware of the project by the time Marriott first reached out, having been surprised to see it announced in The Washington Post without being consulted.

The land which the theme park would sit on had some historical significance, according to the Park Service, which had previously been considering adding parts of the tract to their park. One area in particular, Stuart's Hill, was the headquarters of Confederate general J. E. B. Stuart during the battle, and the woods below the hill provided cover for Robert E. Lee's soldiers, making the area instrumental in the Confederate victory in the battle. The Park Service deliberately chose not to explicitly take a side on the Marriott issue, however, in part because then-president Richard Nixon's brother Donald Nixon was an executive at Marriott.

On April 3, 1973, a hearing about the project was held before the House Committee on Interior and Insular Affairs and the Subcommittee on National Parks and Recreation, spurred by strong opposition from local residents and Park Service members. In preparation for the hearing, several members of the subcommittee visited the site of the proposed construction in Manassas, while David Brown represented the Marriott Corporation before Congress. A primary concern at the hearing was Marriott's request to the county for permission to build a tower of up to 350 feet (110 m) in height, which would almost certainly be visible from the battlefield and disrupt the view. Brown explained that the tower in question had not yet been designed, but probably would be much less than the maximum proposed height and would be placed in a low-lying section of the park. He also definitively stated that the amusement park would not be built if the company did not receive a direct interchange from I-66 to the park, regardless of how much had already been invested by that point, to avoid the possibility of bringing high traffic to local unpaved roads.

Two days after the hearing, on April 5, the county board approved the entertainment center and light industrial zones for Marriott's proposal. The company had options open with ten property owners to purchase 513 acres, but all were set to expire on April 7, and if the zoning was not approved by that deadline Marriott would move on to some other location in the region. A majority of four board members, nicknamed by detractors as "the Four Horsemen", favored the theme park's construction. Marriott bought the land and began planning for construction, but was held up by an ongoing lawsuit over the county zoning board's procedures.

In early 1974, the county lost the suit, as it was found that the board did not give proper notice of the Marriott-related meetings with the state-mandated minimum of nineteen days in advance. All zoning decisions made by the board since the state law was passed in 1968 became subject to challenge, and one supervisor on the board stated that the decision "wiped out five months of work by Marriott".

Other issues continued to plague the project, such as the proposed interchange along I-66, which the state had not approved. The federal government asked for a detailed statement on the environmental impact of the park, which would take at least a year to complete, before plans could proceed. The prolonged fight over the plan was referred to by some as the "third battle of Manassas". By October 1974, it became clear to Marriott that the park would not be completed in time for the bicentennial, and the projected opening date was pushed back to 1977, and again weeks later to 1978. The Virginia project was placed "on the back-burner" while Marriott focused on construction at its California and Illinois parks.

The other two Great America parks successfully opened in the spring of 1976, while the Virginia site continued to remain undeveloped. Marriott finally dropped the Manassas location from consideration in 1977 after years without progress, writing off the project as a loss in an earnings statement. The issue of whether to expand the Manassas Battlefield Park was not resolved for years afterward, and the area faced similar threats of commercial development with the William Center mall in 1988 and the proposed Disney's America theme park in 1993.

== Second Maryland proposal ==
Marriott began to consider returning to Maryland for its third Great America park even before the Virginia project was formally cancelled. On the same day that the site in Manassas was dropped from consideration, Stephen A. West, a lawyer for the company, met with Howard County officials to discuss the possible return. He stated that while four years had been spent working on building the park in Virginia, they had always considered the area between Washington and Baltimore to be preferable. The new version of the proposal involved only 220 acres of land in Guilford, and would be built in a less rural part of the county than the earlier plan, with the hopes of avoiding some of the issues that had previously held up the project.

Both supporters and opponents of the park plan hoped that residents of Gurnee and Santa Clara, where Marriott's other two parks were now operating, would back them up in their opinions. The company offered a group of Guilford residents a trip to both locations, where they could see "firsthand... what effect they have had on the surrounding neighborhoods", while the California park's critics said that they were no less opposed to its existence now that it was operating.

The continued failure to make any headway in developing the park frustrated Marriott, which was also disappointed by the 1977 season attendance figures at its other parks. By 1978, the company said outright that it was in "no rush" to build its third park, and the following year, after two more proposals were rejected by the county zoning board and in the midst of the 1979 energy crisis reducing automobile travel, the plan was shelved and essentially cancelled.

The failure to build its largest and greatest theme park, in addition to continually disappointing profit levels from the other two parks, led Marriott to leave the amusement park business entirely in 1984. The park in Illinois was sold to the Six Flags chain, and the park in California, after demolition plans were canceled, was sold to the city of Santa Clara. The region ultimately received a major amusement park as the Largo Wildlife Preserve gradually added thrill rides and roller coasters, becoming Six Flags America.
