= Western River Expedition =

Designed but never built amusement ride

The Western River Expedition (WRE) was a Disney theme park attraction that was designed but never built. It was to be a western themed boat ride, slated to appear in the northwestern section of Frontierland at the Magic Kingdom, a theme park at the Walt Disney World Resort in Lake Buena Vista, Florida, United States.

== History ==
=== Walt Disney World ===
When Walt Disney World opened in 1971, it featured many popular Disneyland rides, but not Pirates of the Caribbean. The Western River Expedition was to have been Walt Disney World's answer to this ride. When plans were being made for the Magic Kingdom, Imagineers had no plans to replicate Pirates of the Caribbean for the Magic Kingdom. At the time, it was believed by many Imagineers that Florida residents were too accustomed to pirates, as pirates are part of Florida's local legends and lore. Disney management thought that cowboys and Indians would be more surprising and exciting to Florida residents. However, this led to many inquiries of "Where are the pirates?" and complaints being filed during the early days of the resort's operation.

=== The Ride ===
The attraction began life as a proposal of a historical recreation of the Western Expansion of the United States, that would have been built on the banks of the Mississippi River in St. Louis, near the Jefferson National Memorial. Animator-Imagineer Marc Davis designed the attraction and characters in the form of drawings and models over a five-years period. Disney executives such as Richard Irvine and Roy Disney both liked the idea when presented with Davis' concepts. The attraction was to have been located inside, outside and around an architectural feature in Frontierland known as Thunder Mesa Mountain.

Guests would have entered an inside boarding zone, in a twilight atmosphere (similar to the night atmosphere in Pirates of the Caribbean). After boarding a wooden launch, riders would have glided up a waterfall. The ride's narrator, Hoot Gibson (an audio-animatronic owl) would explain the ride's safety instructions. Then, guests would have passed by peaceful scenes in the wilderness, featuring singing cacti, buffaloes or prairie dogs. They would then encounter Mexican banditos robbing a stagecoach, warning them they would meet again downriver.

Many following scenes would then take place in a fictional town known as Dry Gulch, where guests would have witnessed a musical show (a bank robbery, prisoners escaping the Sheriff's cells via a tunnel, a saloon with a cowboy on horseback on its roof, plus ten other characters including a bartender trying to shoot the intruder off the roof, three saloon girls, and other cowboys hooting and hollering.

Then, back into the wilderness, guests would have discovered Indian adobe houses, and even witnessed a rain dance that causes it to rain on the set. Guests discovered a forest set ablaze with fire. The scene ends with guests about to be robbed by the aforementioned Mexican banditos (from the stagecoach robbery) but escaping via a waterfall-drop finale.

If built, it would have been one of the most complex and expensive Disney attractions of its time, housed in one of the largest show buildings (a large warehouse that stores the interior of the attraction) ever created by the Disney company. Its projected expense is one reason it was never built. The attraction would have also shared the show building with a "runaway" mine train themed roller coaster. Other features of the pavilion-style WRE would have included hiking trails atop the mesa, a Pueblo Indian village, and a pack mule attraction.

=== Pirate locations ===
When the Magic Kingdom opened, the most common complaint from guests were that there were no pirates. Disney hastily built a second Pirates of the Caribbean ride in the Magic Kingdom, thus scrapping plans for the Western River Expedition because much of the budget planned to build it was used in building Pirates of the Caribbean for the Magic Kingdom. The economic downturn of the early 1970s and changes in Disney management also contributed to keeping the project from going through, along with concerns over the stereotypes of Indians and the loss of popularity of Westerns. Years later, there was the possibility that the Western River Expedition would be built. Such chances were minimized due to several factors, which, besides changes in management and an economic downturn, included:

- The opening of Pirates of the Caribbean in 1973. WRE was seen to be a western themed version of Pirates.
- The opening of Space Mountain, Walt Disney's Carousel of Progress, the Star Jets (now Astro Orbiter), and the WedWay PeopleMover (now Tomorrowland Transit Authority PeopleMover) in 1974 and 1975, as part of the Tomorrowland Phase II development. The construction of these four attractions meant that money and resources could not be allocated to construction of attractions in other lands.
- Groundbreaking for Big Thunder Mountain Railroad in 1979, which took place on the very tract of land reserved for WRE.

When ground broke on Big Thunder Mountain Railroad in January 1979, Marc Davis, desperate to save his Western River Expedition, offered a compromise: the roller coaster could be built as long as a scaled down WRE was built opposite the railroad tracks. There would be no trails on top of this scaled down version. The only thing WRE would have was the boat ride. The proposed compromise never was enacted, and construction of Big Thunder Mountain Railroad continued. Frontierland would not receive a water based attraction until 1992, when Splash Mountain, a log flume themed to the film Song of the South, opened.

== Attractions with elements of the Western River Expedition ==
=== Tom Sawyer Island ===
The original plans for WRE included a raft which would take guests to WRE, according to artist renderings. Guests also take the raft to gain access to Tom Sawyer Island in Florida.

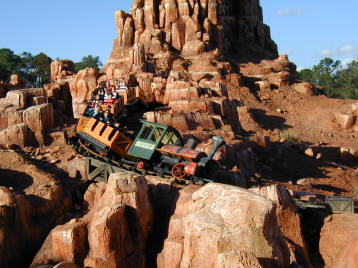
Big Thunder Mountain

=== Big Thunder Mountain Railroad ===
The Magic Kingdom's version of Big Thunder Mountain Railroad opened on November 15, 1980, on the plot of land originally to be occupied by the Western River Expedition. The original concepts for the ride incorporated it into the WRE pavilion, and also featured a backwards segment.

=== Living with the Land ===
Epcot's Living with the Land (originally Listen to the Land) features animatronics originally created for the Western River Expedition.

=== World of Motion ===
The defunct Epcot attraction World of Motion featured a scene with a group of bandits robbing a train. This was based on a similar scene conceptualised for Western River Expedition.

=== Western River Railroad ===
Tokyo Disneyland's Western River Railroad takes its name from WRE.

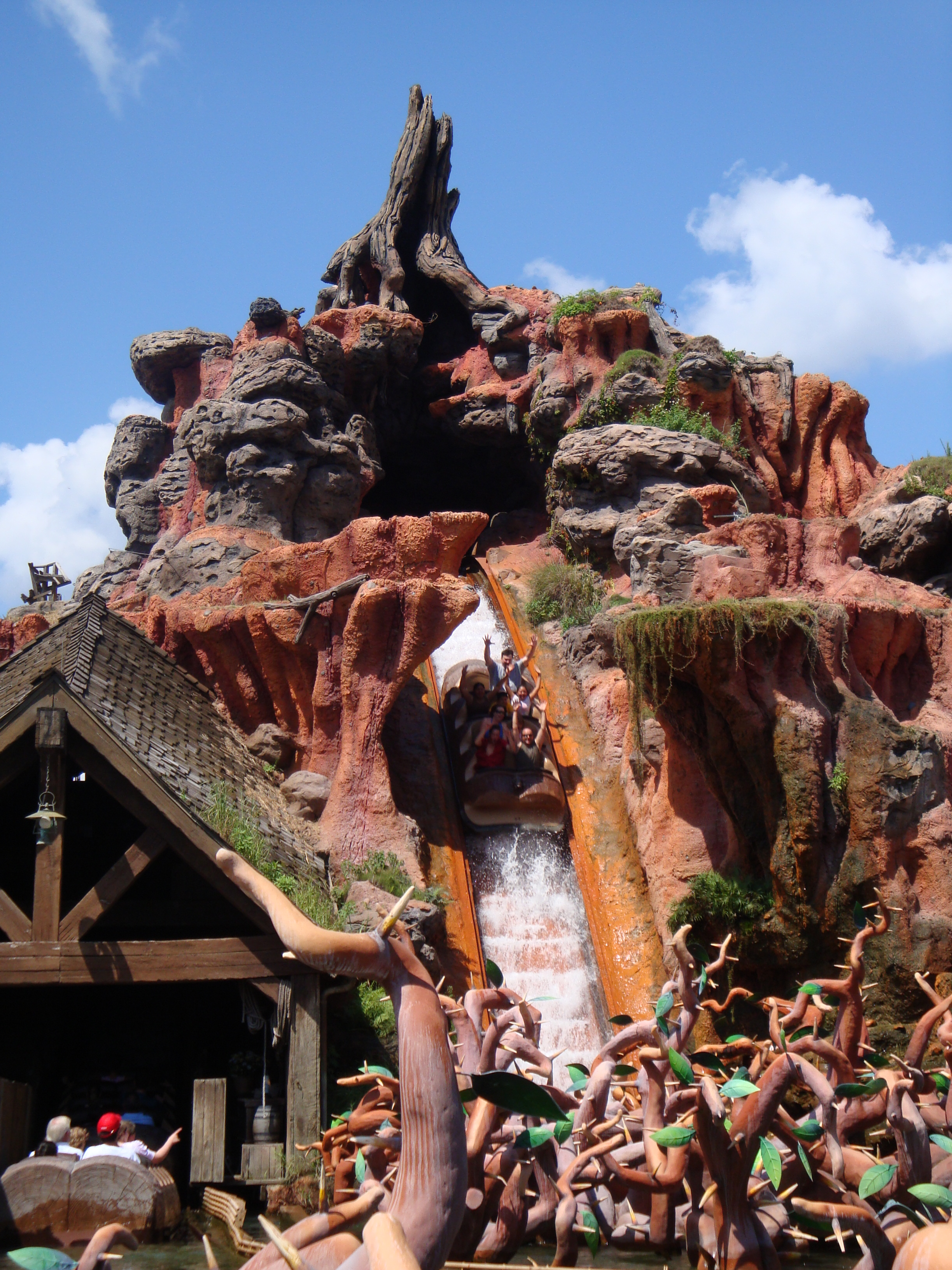
Splash Mountain

=== Splash Mountain / Tiana's Bayou Adventure ===
Splash Mountain and its successor Tiana's Bayou Adventure are derived from the planned boat ride in WRE.

=== Thunder Mesa at Disneyland Paris ===
When Disneyland Paris opened in 1992, Frontierland's fictional town was named Thunder Mesa, as a tribute to the WRE. This version of Frontierland was strongly influenced by WRE compared to any previous version.

=== Phantom Manor ===
The Phantom Canyon scene of Phantom Manor at Disneyland Park (Paris) is derived from the planned scene showing the town of Dry Gulch in WRE. There are even some WRE elements in Phantom Canyon, like the bank robbery, the showgirl and the bartender.

=== Expedition Everest ===
Although one might consider it to have no relations with WRE, Expedition Everest at Disney's Animal Kingdom does take one element from WRE : the backwards segment of the ride. The planned roller coaster in WRE was to have a backwards segment as well.

== Legend among Imagineers ==
Western River Expedition is something of a legend among Disney Imagineers, especially to those who admire the work of Disney legend Marc Davis. Every time Imagineers pitch the ride idea to Disney executives, it is vetoed. Imagineers have instead slipped parts of the ride into other attractions: Splash Mountain, World of Motion, Phantom Manor, and Living with the Land. Davis' concept drawings and model for the Western River Expedition have been filed away in the Imagineering Research Library.

== See also ==
- List of never built Disney attractions
