= Whitefish River (Sudbury District) =

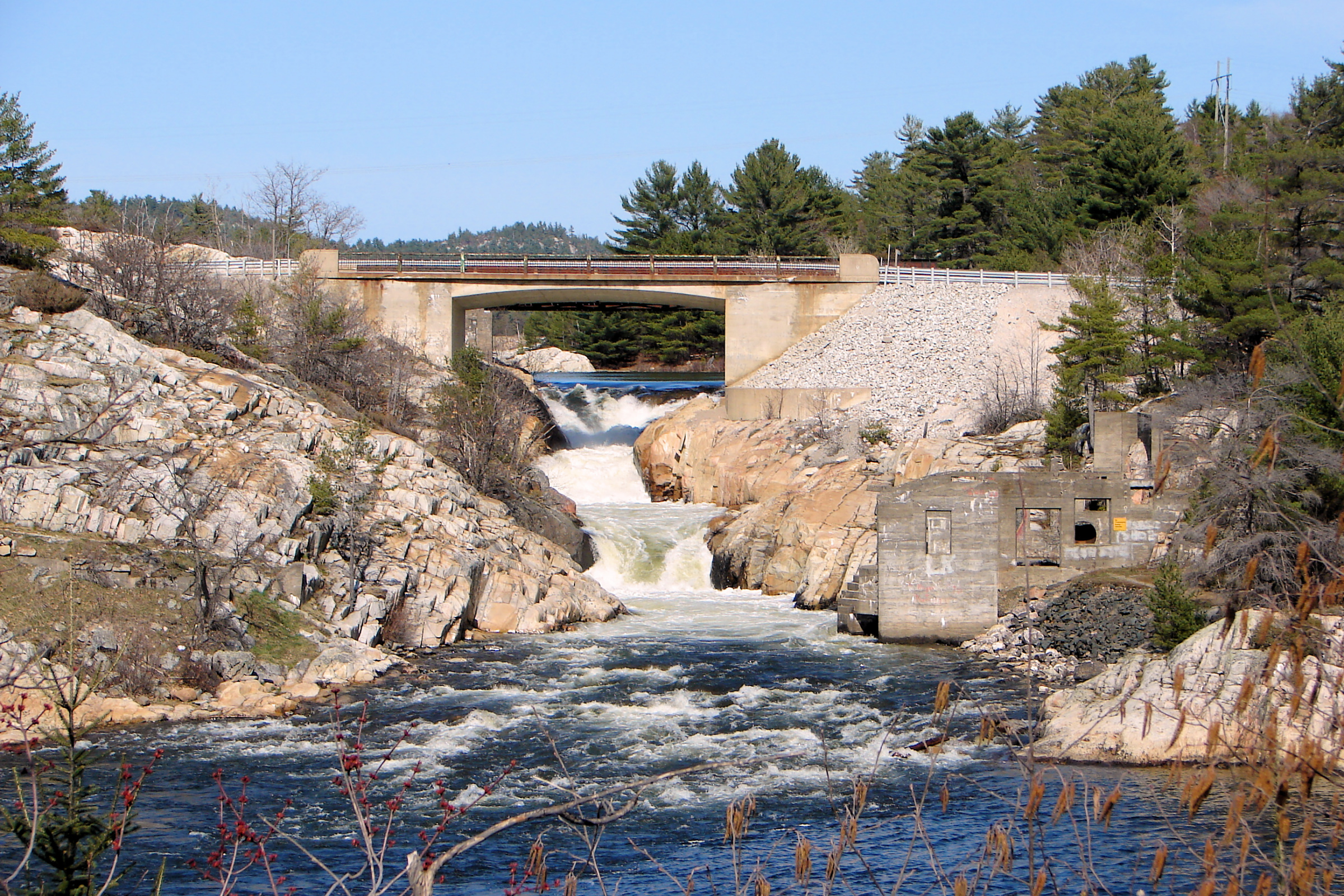
- Whitefish River at Whitefish Falls

- Location of the mouth of the Whitefish River in Ontario

Location
- Country: Canada
- Province: Ontario
- Region: Northeastern Ontario
- District: Sudbury

Physical characteristics
- Source: Daisy Lake
  - coordinates: 46°26′37″N 80°54′02″W
  - elevation: 230 m (750 ft)
- Mouth: North Channel, Lake Huron
  - location: Whitefish Falls
  - coordinates: 46°06′30″N 81°43′57″W
  - elevation: 176 m (577 ft)

Basin features
- Tributaries
  - right: West River

The Whitefish River is a river in Sudbury District in northeastern Ontario, Canada and a tributary of Lake Huron.

== Course ==
The river begins at Daisy Lake in the city of Greater Sudbury. It flows through Richard, McFarlane and Long Lakes to the unincorporated Eden township, where it flows into Round Lake on the Whitefish Lake Ojibwa reserve. From Round Lake, the river flows into Lake Panache.

Near the western end of Lake Panache, the river flows into Walker Lake, Little Bear Lake and Plunge Lake along the outer boundary of Killarney Lakelands and Headwaters Provincial Park. Where Plunge Lake joins Hannah Lake, the river flows westward, entering Lang Lake. It picks up the Howry Creek system as a tributary at the Whitefish River reserve, and subsequently flows into Charlton Lake. At Willisville, the Cranberry River system also flows into the Whitefish River. The river then flows a short distance further, takes in the right tributary West River, and reaches Whitefish Falls, where it ends at the Bay of Islands on the North Channel of Lake Huron.

== Tributaries ==
- West River (right)
- Cranberry River
- Howry Creek (left)
- Lake Panache
  - St. Leonard Creek (right)
  - Annie Creek (left)
  - Gabodin Creek (left)
  - Bevin Creek (left)
- Blackwater Creek (right)
- Makada Creek (right)
- Luke Creek (left)
- Wavy Creek (left)
- Maki Creek (left)

== See also ==
- List of rivers of Ontario

== Sources ==
- "Whitefish River". Geographical Names Data Base. Natural Resources Canada.
- "Topographic Map sheets 41I4, 41I6, 41I7". Atlas of Canada. Natural Resources Canada. 2010-02-04.
