= West River (Ontario) =

- Location of the mouth of the West River in Ontario

Location
- Country: Canada
- Province: Ontario
- Region: Northeastern Ontario
- District: Sudbury
- City: West River

Physical characteristics
- Source: Deerhound Lake
  - coordinates: 46°11′06″N 81°38′56″W
  - elevation: 221 m (725 ft)
- Mouth: Whitefish River
  - coordinates: 46°08′39″N 81°43′45″W
  - elevation: 189 m (620 ft)
- Length: 26.5 km (16.5 mi)

Basin features
- Tributaries
  - left: Fox Creek

The West River is a river in the Whitefish River and Lake Huron drainage basins in southwestern Sudbury District in Northeastern Ontario, Canada.
