= WestCOT =

Canceled Disney theme park in California

- Concept art of the property
- Interactive map of WestCOT
- Location: Disneyland Resort, Anaheim, California, U.S.
- Status: Cancelled
- Owner: The Walt Disney Company
- Operated by: Walt Disney Parks and Resorts
- Theme: Technological innovation and international culture

WestCOT was a planned second theme park for the Disneyland Resort in Anaheim, California. It was essentially a replica of EPCOT Center at the Walt Disney World Resort in Lake Buena Vista, Florida, and was dedicated to the celebration of human achievement, namely technological innovation and international culture. The park was represented by SpaceStation Earth, a larger version of the geodesic sphere Spaceship Earth featured at EPCOT Center.

In the 1990s, The Walt Disney Company expanded the original Disneyland Park into a multi-park, multi-resort business model. Intended to be the centerpiece of the revamping, WestCOT was announced in 1991, though financial restraints contributed to its cancellation in 1995. Its planned site later housed the complex's second theme park Disney California Adventure Park, opened in 2001.

== History ==
In 1991, Disney announced plans to build WestCOT on the site of the Disneyland parking lot. It was themed around a utopian vision of the future, similar to EPCOT Center at Walt Disney World, and it was planned to be the first Disney theme park to contain hotels within the park.

Several issues arose that would ultimately lead to the project's cancellation. It required a significant land acquisition, though residential areas built around Disneyland caused land prices to skyrocket, and thousands of residents wanted to be relocated. Residents claimed that the park's light pollution was too much to bear at night, and that the replica of Spaceship Earth would have become an eyesore. With estimates hovering close to $3 billion and the company's significant financial problems with the recently opened Euro Disney Resort, the project was scrapped in 1995. CEO Michael Eisner held a three-day executive retreat in Aspen, Colorado to come up with a new idea, and from that meeting of about thirty executives came the idea for a California-themed park. That project became Disney California Adventure, which opened in 2001 on the property that WestCOT was to occupy.

The idea of building a resort hotel within a theme park was later realized with Disney's Grand Californian Hotel & Spa, which opened in 2001. Hotel guests are able to access Disney California Adventure through an entrance at the northwest corner of the park.

== Areas ==
=== Future World ===
A shuttle system was going to be planned to transport guests from the parking lot to the center of WestCOT, which would have been dubbed the "Center Court". In Future World, a 300-foot replica of the 180-foot Spaceship Earth from EPCOT Center, named SpaceStation Earth (it was supposed to be golden instead of white), was going to be built. Although plans were made for a giant white spire to be at the center of Future World, residents of the surrounding neighborhoods complained of the proposed size of the structure. An attraction similar to Adventure Thru Inner Space was cloned to WestCOT as Cosmic Journeys. Improved clones of EPCOT Center attractions were also planned for Future World, including Horizons, World of Motion, Journey Into Imagination, Universe of Energy, The Living Seas, Wonders of Life, and The Land.

=== World Showcase ===
World Showcase was cloned, though countries were grouped by regions to represent the "Four Corners of the World" rather than individual nations. The first pavilion that guests saw upon entering WestCOT’S World Showcase was the Americas Pavilion, with an area representing the early 20th century United States at the park's entrance. The theme of Main Street U.S.A. at Disneyland was continued, as the parks’ gateways were facing each other across a central plaza. The American Adventure in EPCOT Center had been cloned and updated. A First Nations Spirit Lodge show was shown in the Canadian section and an indoor Mexican area included a fiesta show and restaurant. There was another spirit show, featuring the Inca and Aztec cultures.

One of the centerpiece attractions was the World Cruise, which was intended to be a boat cruise around the World Showcase. Audio animatronics scenes were used to depict many of the events shown, including Leonardo da Vinci working on the Mona Lisa, the burning of Rome, and Michelangelo painting the Sistine Chapel. After the show's conclusion, guests could board the next boat to continue the cruise or explore the rest of the area on foot. A clone of the attraction The Timekeeper was made to be built in the European section.

In Asia, Ride the Dragon, a steel roller coaster running through the Dragon’s Teeth Mountains had cars designed like Chinese lion-dragons seen in festival dances. At the point where the coaster was at its peak height, enabling riders to see out of the park, the moving cars would be engulfed in billowing red and gold silks to hide the outside world. For smaller children, there was a carousel in this area of mythical Asian animals. Architecturally, the Asian Corner was composed of Japanese and Chinese elements and a white marble Indian palace which housed the dining and entertainment sections of this particular Corner of the World.

The African Corner featured a white water river raft ride down the fictional Congobezi River, as well as an exhibit on basic farming culture. There was outdoor entertainment in the form of African drummers. There were also designs to build a grand Egyptian Palace; the latter was agreed for the park’s first expansion.

Based on the concept image, there was a hotel inspired by the Disney's Grand Floridian Resort and Spa in Walt Disney World.

Regions names and brief designs

- London – Was an iconic showing of the famous city in England featuring "Big Ben".
- New York – Went with the American City Pavilion
- Africa
- Asia
- Paris – Housed the Eiffel Tower
- Tokyo
- China
- Toronto
