= Ontario Highway 537 =

Ontario provincial highway

Highway 537

Route information
- Maintained by Ministry of Transportation of Ontario
- Length: 15.4 km (9.6 mi)
- Existed: May 9, 1956–present

Major junctions
- South end: Estaire Road (Highway 7279)
- Highway 69 near Wanup
- North end: Finni Road near Wahnapitae (continues as Municipal Road 537)

Location
- Country: Canada
- Province: Ontario
- Major cities: Greater Sudbury

Highway system
- Ontario provincial highways; Current; Former; 400-series
← Highway 535	→ Highway 538
Former provincial highways
← Highway 536

Secondary Highway 537, commonly referred to as Highway 537, is a provincially maintained secondary highway in the Canadian province of Ontario. The highway is 16.1 kilometres (10.0 mi) in length, connecting Highway 69 near Wanup with Finni Road. It once continued 3.6 km (2.2 mi) further to intersect Highway 17 in Wahnapitae, but was truncated in 1998; this portion of the route is now designated as Greater Sudbury Municipal Road 537. Highway 537 is now the only secondary highway in the province located within a jurisdiction that also maintains its own county/regional road network.

== Route description ==
Highway 537 is a 19.7 km (12.2 mi) cut-off route between Highway 69 and Highway 17 southeast of Sudbury. It is also the main access road to the communities of Wanup and St. Cloud. The two-laned highway is paved for its entire length, as well as for the 3.6 kilometres (2.2 mi) that continues as Municipal Road 537.

The route begins at Estaire Road (unsigned Highway 7279) within Greater Sudbury near an interchange with Highway 69 (slated to become a northerly extension of Highway 400) and travels 2.7 kilometres (1.7 mi) east, past the interchange and through forest, to the community of Wanup, where it intersects the Old Wanup Road. Prior to 2009, the highway began at Highway 69, which at that time followed Estaire Road, immediately north of the Wanapitei River. It then proceeded north for 2.0 kilometres (1.2 mi) alongside the river to the intersection with the current route in Wanup.

From Wanup, the highway travels eastward and northward towards Highway 17, travelling through sparsely populated forest along the way. It crosses the Wanapitei River at the community of St. Cloud. Provincial maintenance of the route ends just north of a small development at Finni Road, where the road continues as Sudbury Municipal Road 537 north into Wahnapitae, ending at Highway 17 within the community.

According to the Ministry of Transportation (MTO), on an average day, approximately 3,150 vehicles travel Highway 537 between the Wanapitei River and Finni Road, while approximately 570 vehicles travel the highway between Estaire Road and the Wanapitei River. These represent the heaviest and least travelled sections of the route.

== History ==
Highway 537 was first assumed by the Department of Highways (DHO), predecessor to the modern MTO, in 1956, along with several dozen other secondary highways. It may have been provincially maintained as a development road prior to that. The Wanup–Wanapitei Road was assumed by the DHO on May 9, 1956, connecting Highway 69 with Highway 17. It was an unpaved gravel road at the time, and remained as such until the mid-1980s; it was paved in 1984 or 1985.

As part of a series of budget cuts initiated by premier Mike Harris under his Common Sense Revolution platform in 1995, numerous highways deemed to no longer be of significance to the provincial network were decommissioned and responsibility for the routes transferred to a lower level of government, a process referred to as downloading. The 2.9 km (1.8 mi) section of Highway 537 within Nickel Centre was transferred to the Regional Municipality of Sudbury on January 1, 1998. The remainder of the highway was in the unincorporated townships of Dill, Cleland, and Dryden, and had no lower government to take over maintenance of the Highway 537 route until the area was amalgamated with the region to form Greater Sudbury on January 1, 2001. Following the amalgamation a further 700 m (2,300 ft) of the route, between the former Cleland–Dryden Township boundary and the former Dryden–Nickel Centre boundary, was transferred to Greater Sudbury, but the remainder of the route still retains its provincial highway designation despite now being entirely within the city limits.

As part of the plan to extend Highway 400 north to Sudbury along the Highway 69 corridor, a new four lane freeway was constructed between Estaire and south of Sudbury. Work began in 2005, and resulted in the construction of a new alignment of Highway 537 west from Wanup to what was then Highway 69 (Estaire Road), with an interchange at the new freeway. Both were completed and opened to traffic on November 12, 2009. Highway 537 was rerouted along the new alignment, while the former routing south from Wanup was renamed Old Wanup Road. It remains part of the provincial highway system under the unsigned 7000-series designation of Highway 7042. This increased the length of Highway 537 by 700 m (2,300 ft).

The Jumbo Creek crossing along Highway 537 experienced annual flooding that resulted in closure of the road and lengthy detours. At the behest of Sudbury councillor Deb McIntosh, Minister of Transportation Steven Del Duca committed to the rehabilitation project on June 15, 2015. The project to raise the roadway through the creek floodplain was tendered in 2018, and proceeded over the course of the summer of 2019 and 2020. It was completed on October 5, 2020.

== Major intersections ==
The following table lists the major junctions along Highway 537, as noted by the Ministry of Transportation of Ontario. The entire route is located in Greater Sudbury.

Location	km	mi	Destinations	Notes
	0.0	0.0	Estaire Road (Highway 7279)	Highway 537 southern terminus; Highway 69 prior to November 12, 2009
	0.6	0.37	Highway 69 / TCH – Sudbury, Toronto	Interchange; future Highway 400
Wanup	2.7	1.7	Old Wanup Road (Highway 7042)	Prior to 2009, Highway 537 travelled south at this junction rather than continuing west
St. Cloud	5.5	3.4	Wanapitei River bridge	
	16.1	10.0	Finni Road Highway 537 ends Municipal Road 537 begins	Highway 537 northern terminus; Greater Sudbury Municipal Road 537 southern terminus
Wahnapitae	19.7	12.2	Highway 17 / TCH – Sudbury, North Bay	Highway 537 northern terminus prior to January 1, 1998; Greater Sudbury Municipal Road 537 northern terminus
1.000 mi = 1.609 km; 1.000 km = 0.621 mi: Closed/former; Route transition
