= Ontario Highway 17 =

Ontario provincial highway

Highway 17
- Trans-Canada Highway
- ON 17 highlighted in red

Route information
- Maintained by Ministry of Transportation of Ontario
- Length: 1,964.0 km (1,220.4 mi)
- Existed: July 9, 1920–present
- Tourist routes: Lake Superior Circle Tour; Lake Huron Circle Tour

Major junctions
- West end: PTH 1 (TCH) towards Winnipeg
- Highway 71 – Kenora; Highway 61 – Thunder Bay; Highway 11 – Nipigon; Highway 101 – Wawa; Highway 6 – McKerrow; Highway 69 – Sudbury; Highway 11 – North Bay; Highway 41 – Pembroke; Highway 60 – Renfrew
- East end: Highway 417 (TCH) near Arnprior

Location
- Country: Canada
- Province: Ontario
- Major cities: Kenora, Dryden, Ignace, Thunder Bay, Wawa, Sault Ste. Marie, Sudbury, North Bay, Mattawa, Petawawa, Pembroke, Arnprior

Highway system
- Ontario provincial highways; Current; Former; 400-series
← Highway 16	→ Highway 17A

King's Highway 17, more commonly known as Highway 17, is a provincially maintained highway and the primary route of the Trans-Canada Highway through the Canadian province of Ontario. It begins at the Manitoba boundary, 50 kilometres (31 mi) west of Kenora, and the main section ends where Highway 417 begins just west of Arnprior. A small disconnected signed section of the highway still remains within the Ottawa Region between County Road 29 and Grants Side Road. This makes it Ontario's longest highway, (Note: See List of highways in Ontario for length comparisons.) and Canada's second-longest provincial highway, narrowly surpassed by British Columbia Highway 97.

The highway once extended even farther to the Quebec boundary in East Hawkesbury with a peak length of about 2,180 kilometres (1,350 mi). However, a section of Highway 17 "disappeared" when the Ottawa section of it was upgraded to the freeway Highway 417 in 1971. Highway 17 was not re-routed through Ottawa, nor did it share numbering with Highway 417 to rectify the discontinuity, even though Highway 417 formed a direct link between the western and eastern sections of Highway 17. However, from East Hawkesbury to Ottawa, Highway 17 retained the Trans-Canada Highway routing and signs until it met up again and merged with Highway 417. In 1997, Highway 17 through Ottawa was downgraded to municipal authorities (now known as Ottawa Road 174), so the Trans-Canada Highway designation now extends along all of Highway 417.

Ontario Highway 17 is a very important part of the national highway system in Canada, as it is the sole highway linking the eastern and western regions of the country. Although other small roads connect the province of Ontario with the province of Manitoba, it is the only major highway that links the two, making it a crucial section of Canada's primary commercial and leisure route.

== History ==
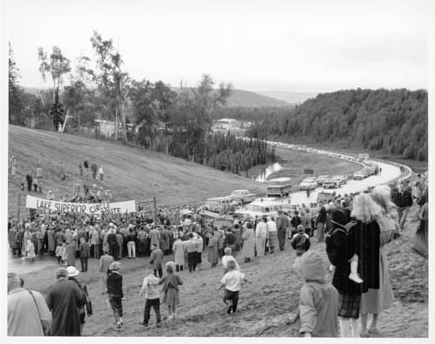
The official ceremony for the opening of the Lake Superior Circle Tour and the Trans-Canada Highway was held on September 17, 1960, near Wawa.

=== Beginnings ===
With the establishment of the provincial highway network on February 26, 1920, the Department of Public Highways, predecessor to today's Ministry of Transportation of Ontario, sought to establish a network of reliable roads through the southern part of the province. Through July and August 1920, a highway east of Ottawa to Pointe-Fortune at the Quebec boundary, known as the Montreal Road, was assumed by the department. This original routing of Highway 17 followed what is now Montreal Road, St Joseph Boulevard, and the Old Montreal Road eastward out of Ottawa; Laurier Street through Rockland; Regional Road 55 and 26 between Clarence and Plantagenet; Blue Corner Road and Bay Road (Regional Road 4) to L'Original; John Street, Pharand Street, Eliza Street, and Main Street to Hawkesbury; Front Road along the shore of the Ottawa River from Hawkesbury to Chute-a-Blondeau and Des Outaouais Road just west of and Pointe-Fortune, and Regional Road 17 elsewhere. A portion of this original highway was lost when the completion of the Carillon Generating Station in 1964 raised the water level of the Ottawa River north of Voyageur Provincial Park.

West of Ottawa, a route was assumed to Arnprior on October 6, following today's Carling Avenue, March Road and Donald B. Munro Drive between Ottawa and Kinburn, and Kinburn Side Road and Madawaska Boulevard between Kinburn and Arnprior. On June 15, 1921, the highway was extended to Pembroke via Renfrew, Cobden, and Beachburg. The entire route between Pembroke and Pointe-Fortune became known as Highway 17 in the summer of 1925.

Although the jurisdiction of the soon-to-become Department of Highways did not extend beyond Pembroke, a rough trail continued to North Bay, and a trunk road constructed by the Department of Northern Development beyond there to Sault Ste. Marie by 1923, roughly following the route of Highway 17 today. The Pembroke and Mattawan Road Colonization Road or Great Northern Road was constructed between 1853 and 1874 to encourage settlement in the Upper Ottawa Valley. Between Mattawa and North Bay, many aboriginals and early settlers made use of the Mattawa River, the headwaters of which lie just north of Lake Nipissing. From there they would travel down the French River into Georgian Bay and onwards to Lake Superior. Highway 17 between Mattawa and Sault Ste. Marie roughly traces this early voyageur route.

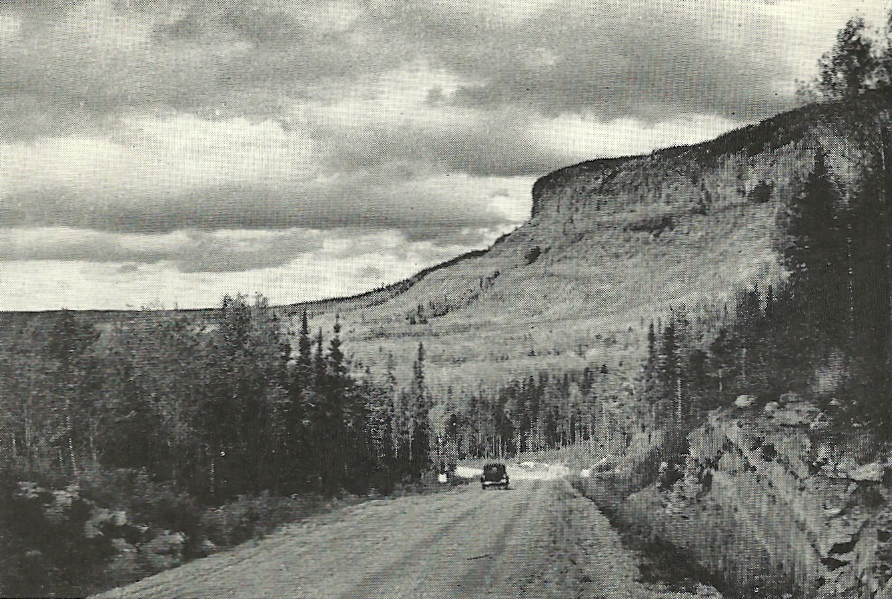
Highway 17 at Nipigon Bay in 1937.

=== Northern development and the Lakehead ===
Following World War I, discussions of a cross-continental road through Canada became vocal and construction of such a route was underway in several places. However, funding for this work was soon halted as the government distributed funding to projects that were believed to be more important than the luxury of the new road. The most significant accomplishment of this work was the Nipigon Highway between Thunder Bay and Nipigon, opened in 1924.

With the signing of the Department of Northern Development (DND) Act in 1926, construction resumed on improving many northern roads; the Ferguson Highway was the main project to begin as a result of the act. The onset of the Great Depression would result in federally funded relief projects being signed with provinces in late 1930. Thousands of men were hired to construct highways in remote areas of the province from temporary camps, named Bennett Camps after then-Prime Minister R. B. Bennett. This provided the necessary labour to open road links through vast expanses of wilderness in a relatively short period of time. Beginning in 1931, certain routes were designated as the Trans-Canada Highway, including the route between Sault Ste. Marie and the Quebec boundary as well as the planned connection to Thunder Bay and Winnipeg.

A gravel-surfaced Highway 17 near Kenora in 1939

By June 1931, planning for the route of the highway was complete, and work underway on the new link between Thunder Bay and Winnipeg that would roughly parallel the Canadian Pacific Railway. The first section to open was between the Manitoba town of Whitemouth and Kenora. On July 1, 1932, (Dominion Day), an inter-provincial ceremony was held in Kenora to dedicate the new route. The next link would connect the road through the Kenora with the rough road connecting Vermilion Bay, Dryden and Dyment. This section opened in early 1933.

From the east, construction proceeded at a similar pace, although through much more barren expanses of forests and lakes. By the end of 1932, construction had proceeded from Thunder Bay through Upsala to English River. A 75-mile (121 km) gap was all that remained, between Dyment and English River. On June 4, 1934, crews cleared the last section of forest separating Thunder Bay from Winnipeg. However, it would require another year of rock blasting and construction to make the route navigable by vehicles. On July 1, 1935, a multi-day motorcade celebration was held to officially open the new highway. A convoy of vehicles travelled from Thunder Bay to Winnipeg along the route, resting overnight in Kenora before completing the two-day journey.

By the end of 1935, numerous factors combined which resulted in the termination of the highway camps. The federal government of R. B. Bennett used Section 98 of the Criminal Code in 1931 to arrest several leaders of the Communist Party of Canada. However, the lack of evidence and protests would eventually lead to the early release of the men, much to the embarrassment of the government. The men, with public support behind them, headed north to highway camps, where mounting tensions due to low wages, poor conditions, lacklustre food, isolation, and military-like discipline resulted in organized labour strikes. Funding was pulled from the Trans-Canada Highway in 1936.

Construction of the Nipigon River Bridge, July 1937

Opening ceremony for the bridge and highway connection east to Schreiber, September 24, 1937

On April 1, 1937, the DND was absorbed into the Department of Highways, and the road west of Pembroke became an extension of Highway 17. At this point, the highway from Sault Ste. Marie to the Quebec boundary was 1,045.8 km (649.8 mi) long. Portions were paved at this point: east of Sault Ste. Marie, west of Blind River, through Sudbury, east of Sturgeon Falls, through Mattawa, and from Chalk River to Quebec; the remainder was a gravel road. The highway between the Manitoba boundary and Nipigon was 659.8 km (410.0 mi), mostly gravel-surfaced. The only significant exceptions were in the Kenora and Thunder Bay areas.

Before the outbreak of World War II in 1939, a new bridge spanning the Nipigon River was completed alongside a 91.6-kilometre (56.9 mi) highway eastward to Schreiber. Both were opened together ceremoniously on September 24, 1937. When the war began, construction on Highway 17 halted, with effort instead focused on the simpler northern route via Geraldton and Hearst.

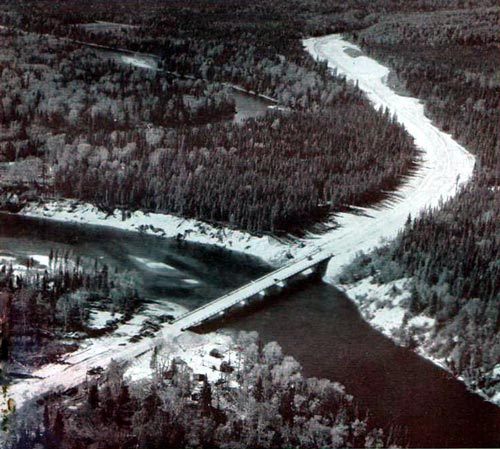
Construction of "the Gap" at the Michipicoten River bridge in 1959

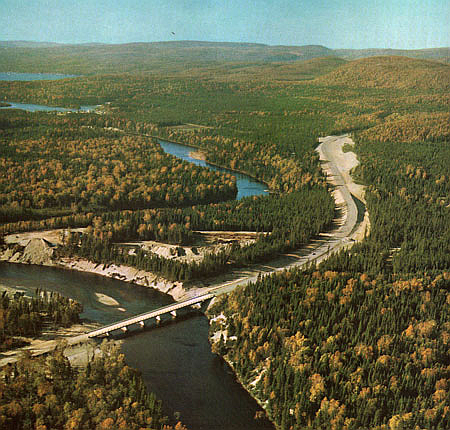
Same angle several days after the opening of the highway on September 17, 1960

=== The Gap ===
Following the war, construction on the missing segment of Highway 17 between Schreiber and Sault Ste. Marie proceeded slowly; the completion of Highway 11 between Nipigon and Hearst already provided a road between the east and west. However, in 1949 the federal government signed the Trans-Canada Highway Act, which provided up to a 90% subsidy to provinces to complete their portion of the highway to the required standards. Two portions of Ontario's route were eligible for this subsidy: Highway 69 between Parry Sound and Sudbury, and Highway 17 along the north shore of Lake Superior.

Amongst some of the most difficult terrain encountered in Canada, engineers blasted 2,087,234 cubic metres (2,730,000 cubic yards) of rock, removed 5,982,641 cubic metres (7,825,000 cubic yards) of earth, and cleared 6.97 square kilometres (1,720 acres) of forest in order to bridge the 266 kilometres (165 mi) of wilderness known as "the Gap". The Gap was completed and opened to traffic on September 17, 1960, uniting the two segments and completing the route of Highway 17 from the Manitoba border to the Quebec border.

=== The Queensway ===
During the 1950s, the Greber Plan called for the creation of numerous parkways and divided highways through the growing city of Ottawa. One of these, known as The Queensway, was a grade-separated freeway that would bypass the urban alignment of Highway 17. The Greber Plan was produced by Jacques Gréber under the direction of Prime Minister William Lyon Mackenzie King in the late 1940s. Although Gréber had been corresponding with King as early as 1936, World War II halted any plans from reaching fruition at that time. Following the war, Gréber was again contacted and his expertise requested. He arrived on October 2, 1945, and began working almost immediately. The Greber Plan, as it came to be known, was released in 1950 and presented to the House of Commons on May 22, 1951. The plan called for the complete reorganization of Ottawa's road and rail network, and included amongst the numerous parkways was an east to west expressway along what was then a Canadian National Railway line.

With the rail lines removed, construction of the new expressway got underway in 1957 when Queen Elizabeth visited Ottawa to open the first session of the 23rd Parliament. On October 15, the Queen detonated dynamite charges from the Hurdman Bridge, which now overlooks the highway as it crosses the Rideau River, and formally dedicated the new project as the Queensway. At the ceremony, premier Leslie Frost indicated that the entire project would cost C$31 million and emphasized the importance of the link to the Trans-Canada Highway.

The Queensway was constructed in four phases, each opening independently: phase one, from Alta Vista Drive (now Riverside Drive) east to Highway 17 (Montreal Road); phase two, from Highway 7 and Highway 15 (Richmond Road) to Carling Avenue; phase three, from Carling Avenue to O'Connor Street; and, phase four, from O'Connor Street to Alta Vista Drive, crossing the Rideau Canal and Rideau River. Phase one opened to traffic on November 25, 1960, extending up to the Rideau River. On the western side of Ottawa, phase two opened a year later in October 1961. The central section presented the greatest challenge, as an embankment was built to create grade-separations. In addition, the structures over the Rideau Canal and river required several years of construction. On May 15, 1964, the majority of the third phase was ceremonially opened. completing the Carling Avenue interchange and extending the freeway as far as Bronson Avenue. Several months later, on September 17 the short but complicated section east to O'Connor Street was opened. This left only phase four, the central section of the Queensway, which was opened in three segments. On November 26, 1965, the structures over the Rideau Canal were opened to traffic. At the same time, the westbound lanes of the Queensway were extended to Concord Street, located west of the Nicholas Street interchange. The interchange opened on January 1, 1966, allowing travel in both directions over the canal. The final segment, linking the two section of the Queensway, was placed into service on October 28, 1966. Following this, the Highway 17 designation was applied along the Queensway and the old routing renumbered as Highway 17B.

=== Bypasses and upgrades ===
Although it was completed from Manitoba to Quebec in 1960, many upgrades to the original routing of Highway 17 had and would take place over the years. In addition to bypasses around almost every urban centre it encountered, many original sections have been downloaded to regional and local jurisdiction or decommissioned entirely to lie abandoned in the forest. Of special note are reroutings in the Ottawa Valley – where the highway follows very little of the original routing – and around Thunder Bay, where it has undergone several reroutings and upgrades since the 1920s. In the following section, upgrades are listed from west to east due to complex chronologies.

Thunder Bay

The original routing of Highway 17 travelled into Port Arthur along the Dawson Road, now Highway 102.

Nipigon

Highway 17 originally entered Red Rock along what is now Highway 628 before turning north alongside the Nipigon River north to Nipigon.

Sault Ste. Marie

Although the route into and out of Sault Ste. Marie has remained generally the same, Highway 17 has been rerouted through the city numerous times. In addition, to the east of the city, the route has been redirected onto a four lane at-grade expressway around Echo Bay. As recently as 2022, local government has reached out to the provincial government to revisit possibilities of creating a bypass around Sault Ste. Marie—however this plan has long been stalled by the MTO and provincial government, largely due to the high cost of construction and uncertain demand; there has also been no environmental impact assessment to date.

Espanola

Sudbury

The route of Highway 17 in Sudbury currently follows the Southwest and Southeast Bypasses through the south end of the city. Prior to the completion of this route, the highway followed what is now Municipal Road 55 through the downtown core.

North Bay

Upper Ottawa Valley

Construction of the Renfrew Bypass began in June 1974, and continued for three years, opening in 1977.

Ottawa

Lower Ottawa Valley

Elsewhere

The last gravel stretches of Highway 17, between Kenora and Dryden and north of Batchawana Bay, were paved in 1964.

=== Downloads ===
On April 1, 1997, the Ministry of Transportation of Ontario (MTO) transferred the responsibility of maintenance and upkeep along 14.2 km (8.8 mi) of Highway 17 east of "the split" with Highway 417 to Trim Road (Regional Road 57), a process commonly referred to as downloading. The Region of Ottawa–Carleton designated the road as Regional Road 174. Despite the protests of the region that the route served a provincial purpose, a second round of transfers saw the remainder of Highway 17 to the Region's eastern limit downloaded on January 1, 1998, adding 12.8 km (8.0 mi) to the length of Regional Road 174. The highway was also downloaded within the United Counties of Prescott and Russell, where it was redesignated as County Road 17. The result of these transfers was the truncation of Highway 17 at the western end of Highway 417, while the Trans-Canada Highway designation was taken from the former Highway 17 and applied to Highway 417. A short disconnected section of Highway 17 between Ottawa Road 29 and Grants Side Road remains under provincial jurisdiction to the present day.

=== Conversion to Highway 417 northwest of Ottawa ===
Expansion of the two lane Highway 17 west of the interchange with Highway 7 got underway in 1991; this section was renumbered as Highway 417 as construction progressed westward. The construction saw a second two lane roadway built parallel to the existing route to create a divided freeway, a process known as twinning.

When the twinning of Highway 17 reached March Road, new contracts were tendered to continue the process northward. Bot Construction was awarded the contract for the section north to Panmure Road on December 9, 1998. On February 16, 2000, the Ministry of Transportation of Ontario (MTO) officially announced that Highway 417 would be extended to Arnprior over the next several years. A contract to build the freeway from north of Panmure Road to south of Arnprior was tendered in early 2002. This work was completed and the extension opened to traffic on September 24, 2004.

Concurrent with the twinning of Highway 7 between Carleton Place and Ottawa, the interchange with Highway 417 was upgraded to support the divided traffic flows; a new flyover ramp was built connecting westbound Highway 417 with westbound Highway 7. Construction began on August 22, 2006, and was opened in June 2008 along with the Highway 7 expansion.

Construction to twin the Arnprior Bypass portion of Highway 17, which included a new interchange at White Lake Road, began during the spring of 2009. The bypass was originally built in 1981 as one of a number of upgrades to Highway 17 between Ottawa and North Bay. It was intended for directing through traffic around downtown Arnprior and was designed for an eventual upgrade to a divided freeway. The major structure in this project was a second crossing of the Madawaska River. Work was completed in late 2012; the new 5.6-kilometre (3.5 mi) section was opened ceremonially on November 29 and cost $63 million, $7 million less than projected.

In 2023, the new interchange with Calabogie Road was completed and opened.

== Route description ==
Highway 17, particularly west of Sault Ste. Marie, crosses some of the most remote regions of Ontario. Despite the isolation of the highway, it is well-travelled throughout its length. The section of Highway 17 north of Lake Superior is regarded as one of the most scenic drives in the province.

=== Manitoba to Nipigon ===
Highway 17 begins at the boundary between Ontario and Manitoba, where a large installation greets drivers in both directions. West of this point, the highway continues westward as Highway 1 to Winnipeg, Manitoba; Regina, Saskatchewan; Calgary, Alberta; and eventually Vancouver, British Columbia. Highway 17 is two lanes wide and travels over and between the surface features of the Canadian Shield; further west into Manitoba, the highway widens into a four-lane, divided expressway. To the east, the highway travels through thick boreal forest towards Keewatin, where the Kenora Bypass, Highway 17A, splits to the north. Through the town of Kenora, Highway 17 is signed but maintained under a connecting link agreement between the town and the province. Full provincial maintenance resumes at the eastern town limits. Further east, the highway merges with the Kenora Bypass. It meets the northern terminus of Highway 71, then makes a gradual eastward journey through the lake-dotted Kenora District to the town of Dryden. Here the highway encounters one of the few agriculturally-sustainable areas of northern Ontario. The highway begins to zig-zag southeasterly, passing through several minor settlements before entering the mining town of Ignace. Shortly thereafter, it begins to curve to the south. It meets Highway 11 475 kilometres (295 mi) east of the Manitoba boundary.

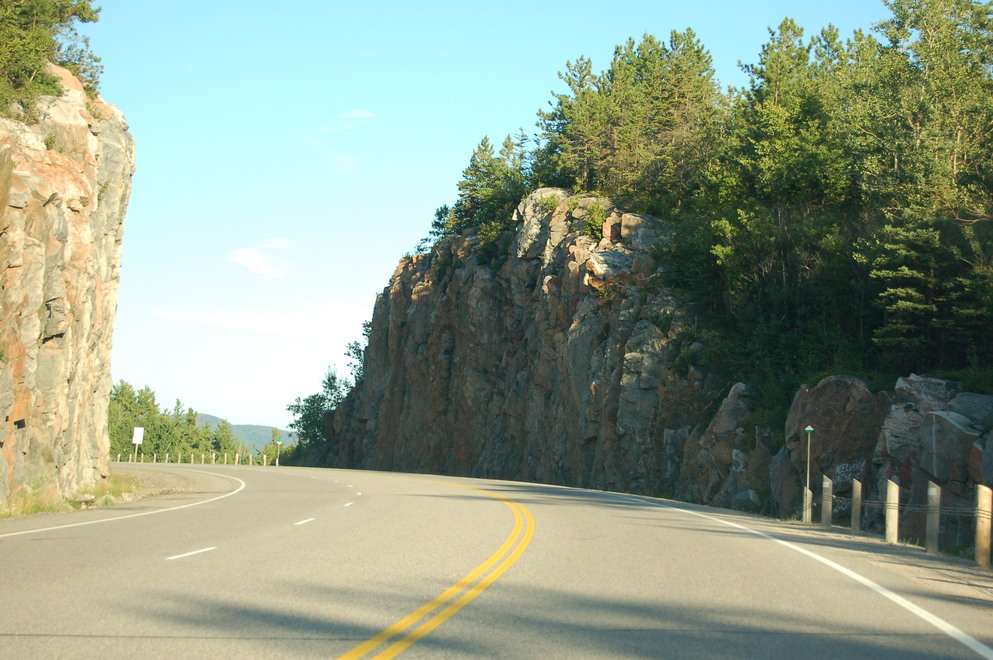
Highway 17 cut on its journey along the north shore of Lake Superior

The two highways travel concurrently towards Thunder Bay at the western Lakehead of Lake Superior. Though it originally travelled through what was then the twin-cities, the highway bypasses to the northwest on the at-grade Thunder Bay Expressway.

=== Nipigon to Sudbury ===
Within Nipigon, Highway 11 and Highway 17 cross the Nipigon River on the Nipigon River Bridge. Along with the railway crossing immediately to the south, and another on the northern shore of Lake Nipigon, this forms the narrowest bottleneck in Canada between the Atlantic and Pacific oceans. On the eastern shore of the river, Highway 11 separates and travels north towards Geraldton and Hearst. Highway 17 continues east along the northern shore of Lake Superior. Near White River, the highway enters Algoma District and turns southward. It meets the western terminus of Highway 101 near Wawa, which provides for a shorter route to Sudbury via the Sultan Industrial Road.

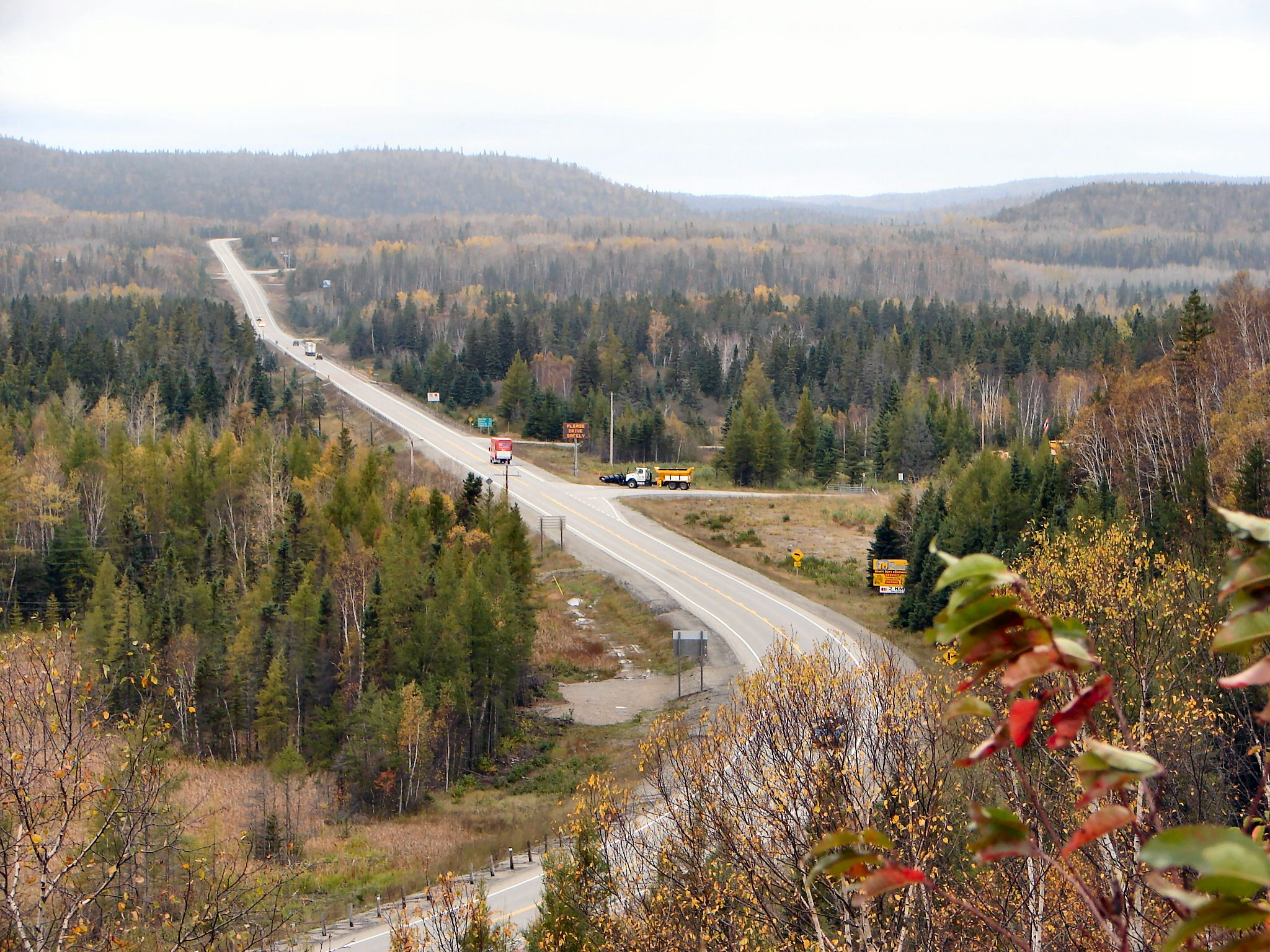
Highway 17 near Wawa

South of Wawa, the highway enters Lake Superior Provincial Park. After proceeding through several mountain ranges, and crossing numerous rivers and the Montreal River Hill, the highway enters Sault Ste. Marie. Here, a border crossing into the United States is provided via the Sault Ste. Marie International Bridge, which connects with I-75 in Michigan. As the highway exits Sault Ste. Marie to the east, a newly constructed segment of four-lane divided highway branches north; Highway 17B (one of two remaining business routes of Highway 17 in service) continues east through Garden River. The divided highway bypasses Garden River and passes east of Echo Bay before curving south and merging with Highway 17B.

Shortly thereafter, it turns to the east and travels along the North Channel of Lake Huron towards Sudbury, passing through numerous small towns, including Thessalon, Blind River, Massey and McKerrow. At Sudbury, the highway widens into a freeway through the Walden area of the city until reaching the Southwest / Southeast Bypass at Lively, where it narrows again to a Super 2 road. This segment is currently undergoing an environmental assessment, with plans to upgrade it to a full freeway in the next ten years.

=== Sudbury to Arnprior ===
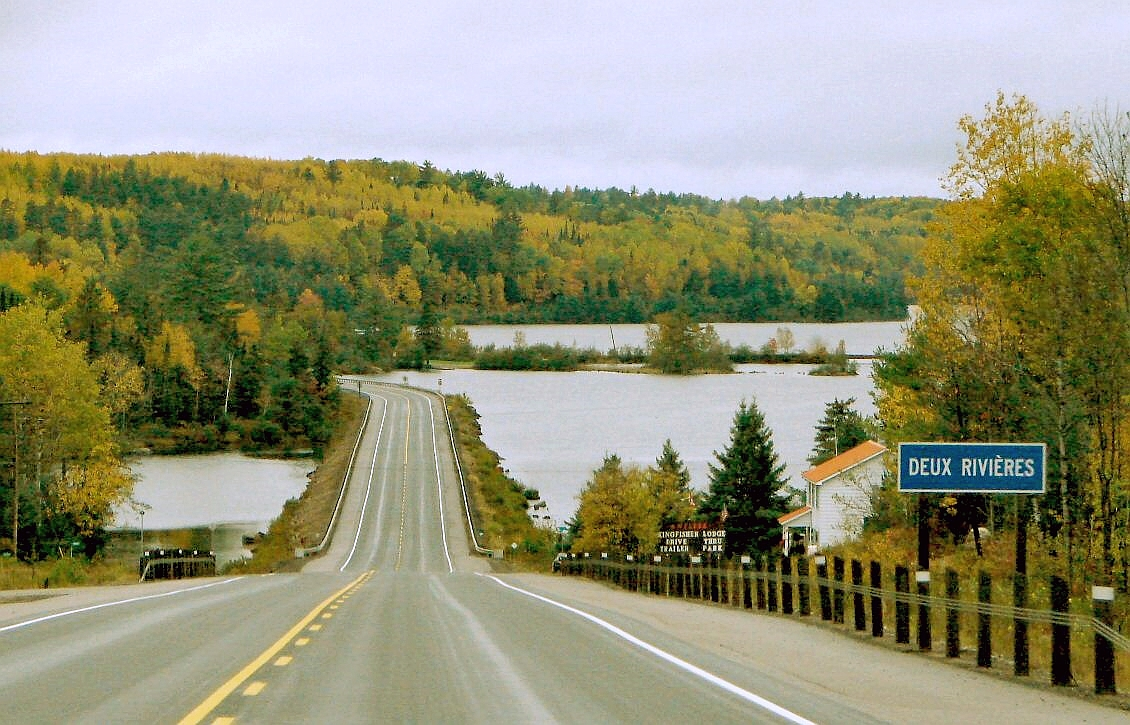
Highway 17 meets the Ottawa River in Deux Rivieres

Highway 17 passes to the south of the urban centre of Sudbury. It meets Highway 69 at an interchange. At this interchange, the Southwest and Southeast Bypasses meet, and for just over a kilometre, Highway 17 is a divided, four-lane freeway.

The Super 2 continues northeast to meet the original alignment of Highway 17 east of downtown Sudbury. Here, it turns east and travels through the city's outlying neighbourhoods of Coniston and Wahnapitae; a new freeway alignment of this route is currently in the planning stages.

The highway route passes through the rural municipalities of Markstay-Warren and West Nipissing before reaching North Bay, where it follows an undivided four-lane expressway alignment, with reduced but not full control of access, through the city of North Bay; as of 2012, early preparations have taken place for a freeway conversion and realignment of this segment. For 4.1 kilometres from Algonquin Avenue to the Twin Lakes area, the route is once again concurrent with Highway 11. At the northern end of this concurrency, Highway 11 travels north towards Cochrane before continuing westward to Nipigon; at the southern end, it continues southward towards Barrie, while Highway 17 turns east toward the Ottawa Valley. An at-grade intersection with Highway 63 is located at approximately the midpoint of the concurrency.

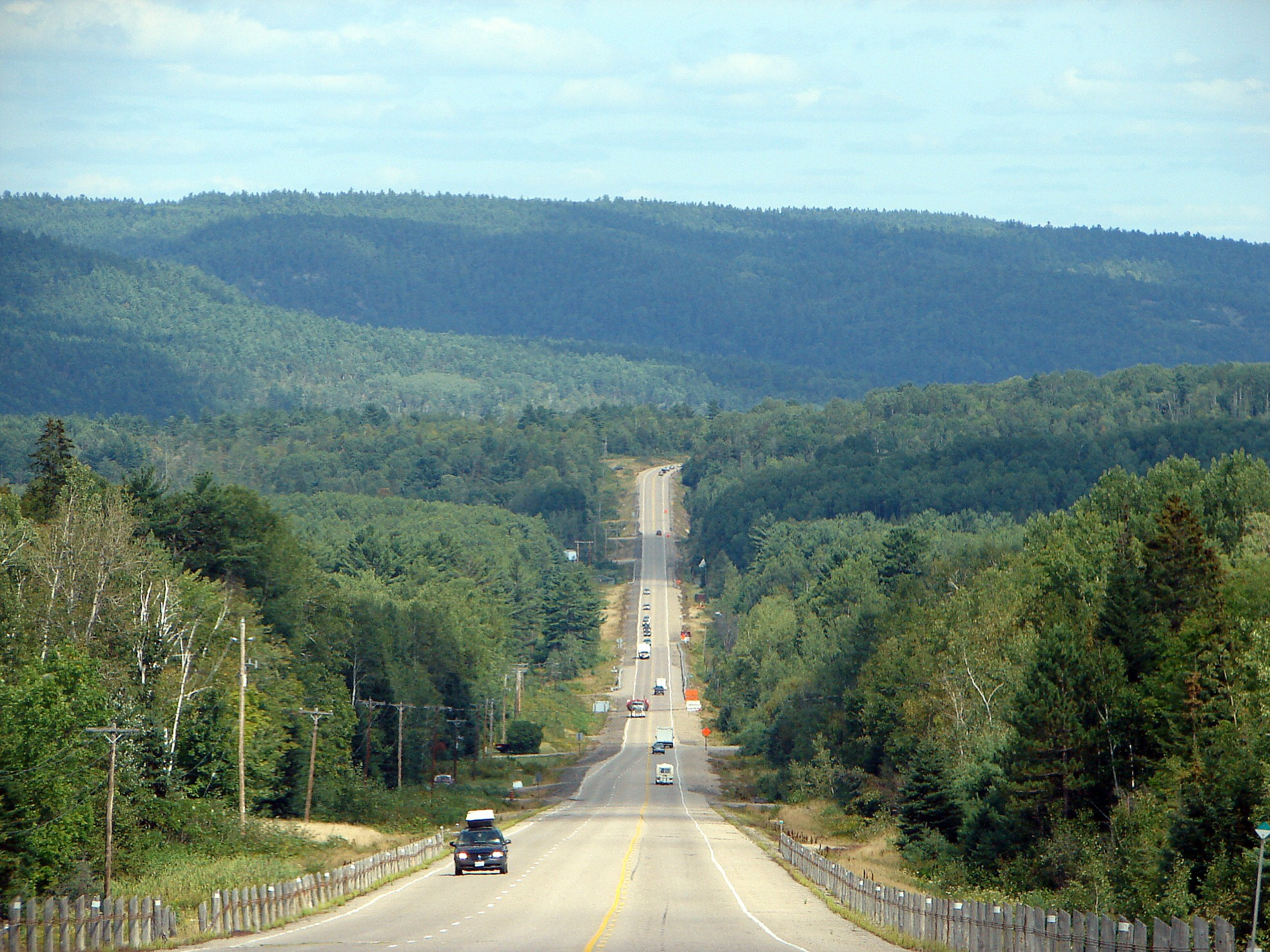
Highway 17 looking east towards Stonecliffe

East of North Bay, Highway 17 meets Highway 94, thereafter travelling alongside the Mattawa River to its confluence with the Ottawa River in Mattawa, where it meets Highway 533 at a roundabout. The highway then parallels the Ottawa River through a mountainous region, first passing through the villages of Stonecliffe and Rolphton before arriving in Deep River, a planned community developed as part of the Manhattan Project. It then passes through Chalk River and enters Canadian Forces Base Petawawa.

Beginning at the southern end of the army base, Highway 17 follows the Pembroke Bypass, bypassing west of Petawawa and Pembroke, where it intersects Highway 41. The bypass ends at Renfrew County Road 40, north of Muskrat Lake. The highway then travels south through the town of Cobden. It follows a bypass east of Renfrew and meets Highway 60. Highway 17 curves east and passes north of Alexander Stewart Provincial Park. Approximately 200 metres (220 yd; 660 ft) west of Scheel Drive, six kilometres (3.7 mi) west of Arnprior, Highway 17 ends, as the roadway divides and widens to four lanes which is the beginning of Highway 417.

From Ottawa to East Hawkesbury, Highway 17 "resumed" as a split from Highway 417. This disconnected segment of Highway 17 retained the Trans-Canada Highway routing and signs until it met up again and merged with Highway 417, shortly before the boundary with the province of Quebec. However in 1997, Highway 17 through Ottawa was downgraded to municipal authorities (now known as Ottawa Road 174), so the Trans-Canada Highway designation now extends along all of Highway 417.

A disconnected section of Highway 17 still exists within the City of Ottawa, between Ottawa Road 29 and Grants Side Road, travelling parallel to Highway 417. However, it is likely to be downgraded, becoming an extension of Ottawa Road 117.

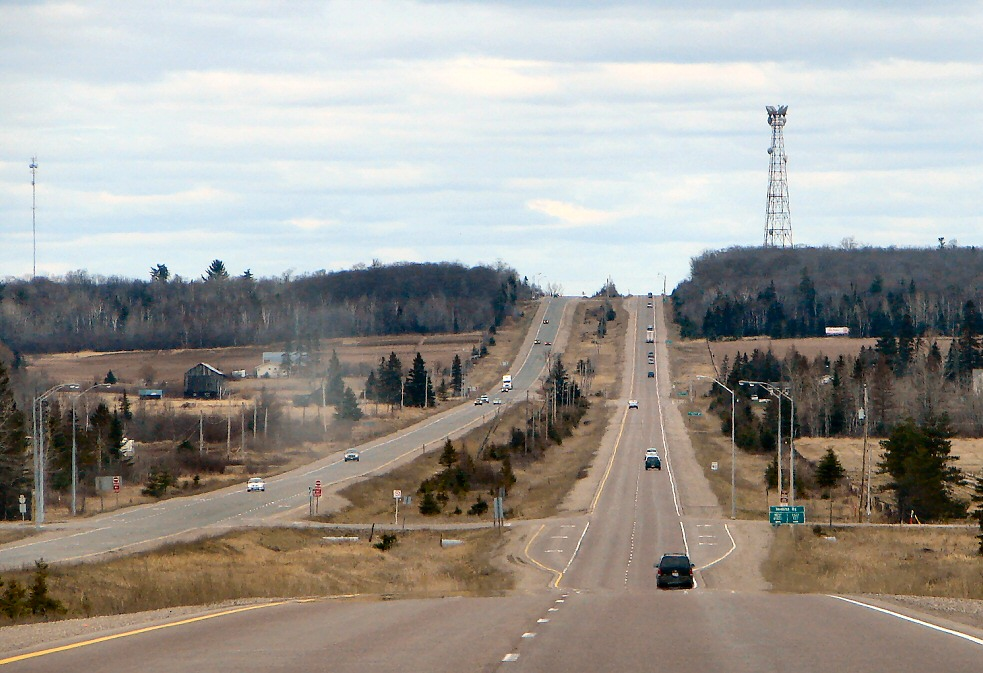
One of the few short sections of 4-lane divided Highway 17 between Echo Bay and Desbarats

=== Business routes ===
For many decades, Highway 17 had five business routes. All were at one time the primary route of Highway 17 through their respective locations, and were given the Highway 17B business route designation following the construction or designation of a newer bypass alignment. Only the route in North Bay remains as the business routes in Ottawa, North Bay, Thessalon and Sault Ste. Marie have been decommissioned.

In 2009, a new Highway 17B route was created in the Garden River First Nation.

== Future ==
With all route planning studies now completed on Highways 11 and 69/400, in the latter half of the 2000s, the Ministry of Transportation's planning branch began undertaking more active preparations for the eventual conversion of Highway 17 to freeway. Although no comprehensive conversion plan is currently in place, planning and construction projects are now underway at a number of locations along the highway.

Sault Ste. Marie MPP David Orazietti has spearheaded a petition to have the entire highway four-laned from Arnprior to Sault Ste. Marie, similar to the campaign previously undertaken by his caucus colleague Rick Bartolucci regarding the extension of Highway 400. Cheryl Gallant, the federal Member of Parliament for Renfrew—Nipissing—Pembroke, has also advocated the four-laning of the highway through the Ottawa Valley toward North Bay, and ultimately the entire length of the highway throughout Northern Ontario.

A 2009 study commissioned by the forestry trade magazine The Working Forest, titled "A Vision for Ontario's Trans Canada Highway, North Bay to the Manitoba Border", determined that it would cost the Ontario government $600 million per year over 25 years to convert the entire length of both Highway 17 and Highway 11 to freeway, suggesting that a comprehensive plan would be affordable and achievable if the provincial and federal governments could reach a cost-sharing agreement.

In 2026, the Northwestern Ontario Municipal Association called for a joint provincial effort to comprehensively upgrade the routes of both Highways 11 and 17 through the region, using a mixture of freeway in urban areas and 2+1 roads in lower-traffic zones.

=== Renfrew County ===
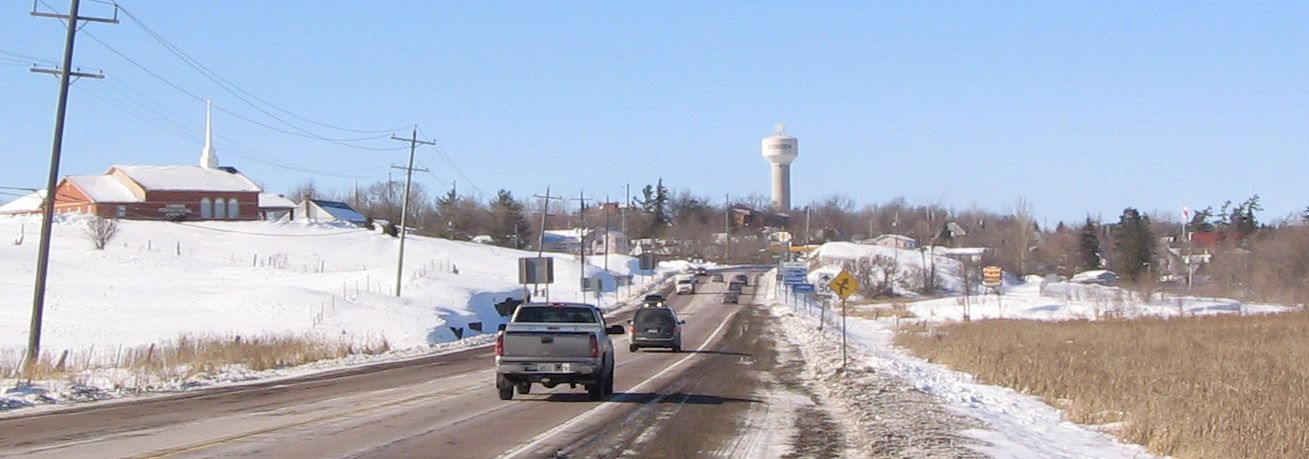
A new route east of Cobden has been selected by the MTO

Studies are underway on the extension of Highway 417 through the Ottawa Valley region from its current terminus at Arnprior to Petawawa. From Arnprior to Haley Station and from Meath to Petawawa, the proposed freeway route largely follows the existing alignment — in these areas, the current highway route largely avoids existing communities, and thus a second set of lanes can be easily added alongside the existing route. Within the township of Whitewater Region, however, a new alignment is planned several kilometres east of the existing road in order to bypass communities such as Cobden.

In August 2017, the Ministry of Transportation formally confirmed that detail design studies have commenced on the next westward extension of Highway 417, from the existing terminus at Scheel Drive in Arnprior to three kilometres west of the Bruce Street intersection at Renfrew.

=== North Bay ===
Planning studies have been completed for the conversion of Highway 17's alignment through North Bay, which is currently a four-lane expressway with partial but not full control of access, into a full freeway. The plan will include an interchange with a new alignment of Highway 11, which would replace the existing Algonquin Avenue segment. In the city, the four-laned route will follow the existing highway route from the western city limits to Meighen Avenue, and then a new alignment from there to the eastbound Highway 11/17 interchange. The bypassed portion of the current route will be realigned to connect with Lansdowne Avenue. This alignment, nicknamed "Route 6", has been planned since the 1970s; although minor adjustments to the plan have been made since, as of 2026 the ministry has not announced an official construction schedule.

Studies commenced on an extension of the four-lane route easterly to Bonfield in early 2011, and from Eau Claire Station to the Nipissing District-Renfrew County boundary in early 2012; further studies on the routes from Bonfield to Eau Claire Station and from North Bay to Cache Bay are expected to begin at a later date.

=== Sudbury ===
As the extension of Highway 400 approaches Sudbury, the MTO began a route planning and environmental assessment study on Highway 17 easterly from Highway 69 to Markstay in 2010; studies for the segment from Highway 69 westerly to the existing freeway in Walden were completed in 2007. The current route plan involves twinning the existing Southeast Bypass to its terminus, along with the construction of a new four-lane route north of Coniston and Wahnapitae.

Original plans called for a new multi-level interchange with Highway 69 in the Lake Laurentian Conservation Area. However, public consultation has since removed this proposal from the route planning process; all of the plans currently under consideration involve converting the existing alignment of Highway 69 to a full freeway which would meet Highway 17 at the existing interchange.

Preliminary route planning studies have also been completed on the freeway's westerly extension to McKerrow, near Espanola, but no construction schedule has been announced to date. However, the first phase of this route, extending the existing freeway from Municipal Road 55 in Sudbury for six kilometres farther west through the Den-Lou neighbourhood, is currently in the detail design phase.

=== Sault Ste. Marie ===
At Sault Ste. Marie, the expressway segment currently ends six kilometres short of its eventual terminus at Black Road and Second Line, as an agreement has yet to be reached with the Batchawana First Nation regarding land use through Rankin. The completion date for this segment is not currently known. In the interim, highway traffic travels between the expressway and the current highway alignment through Sault Ste. Marie by means of the previously planned northerly extension of Trunk Road.

The former segment of Highway 17 through Garden River was initially redesignated as part of Highway 638, although the Garden River First Nation disputed this designation and insisted that the highway be renamed Highway 17B. As of February 2009, the former route is now designated as Highway 17B. In February 2010, Garden River's band council publicly warned that they would consider imposing tolls on the routes of both Highway 17 and Highway 17B through their territory if the provincial government did not assist the council with a funding shortfall of approximately $1 million.

In February 2011, the Ministry of Transportation announced that the expressway's current level intersection at Highway 638 in Echo Bay will be converted to a full interchange.

=== Thunder Bay and Kenora ===
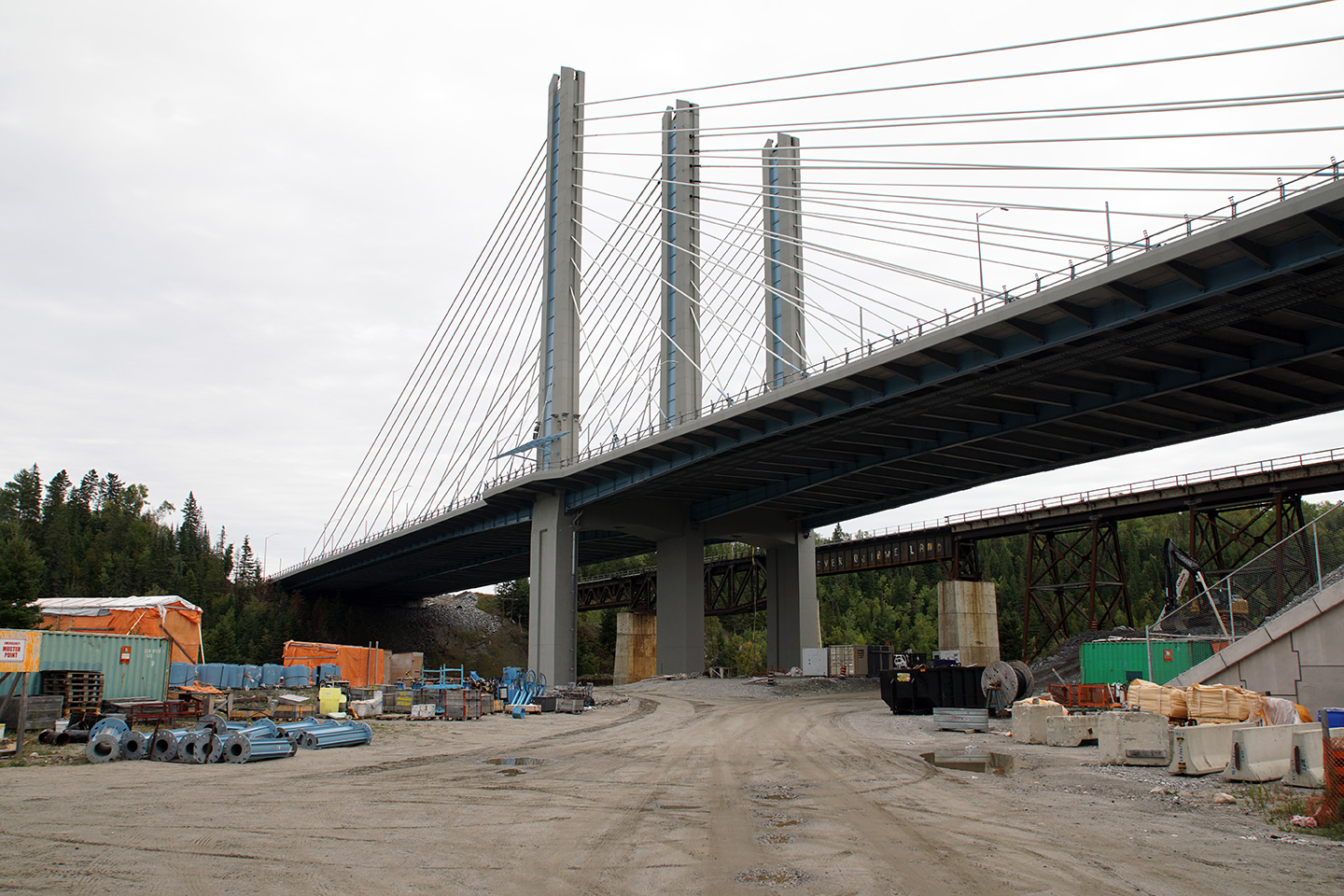
The Nipigon River Bridge, of the cable stayed design, carries Highway 11/17 over the Nipigon River.

Construction started in 2004 on a westerly extension of Thunder Bay's Harbour Expressway, from the Thunder Bay Expressway to Vibert Road, intended to serve as a new alignment for Highways 11 and 17.

In July 2008 the federal and provincial governments announced a $6.2 billion infrastructure program that makes the four-laning of Hwys. 11 and 17 near Kenora and Thunder Bay a priority. Engineering work on twinning 11/17 between Nipigon and Thunder Bay was to begin in 2008. On May 1, 2009 the federal and provincial government announced that twinning of Highway 11/17 would begin in 2010. On May 15, 2009, the federal and provincial government announced that twinning of Highway 17 at the Manitoba–Ontario boundary easterly toward Kenora would also begin in 2010. Construction to twin the highway between Ouimet and Dorion northeast of Thunder Bay was finished in 2023.

On November 19, 2021, the first contracts for the twinning of Highway 17 east from the Manitoba boundary to Kenora were signed. Work is underway on the portion from the provincial boundary to Highway 673.

== Major intersections ==
The following table lists the major junctions along Highway 17, as noted by the Ministry of Transportation of Ontario. Rail and river crossings noted by the ministry are included for remote areas.

Division	Location	km	mi	Exit	Destinations	Notes
Kenora	Unorganized Kenora	0.0	0.0	—	PTH 1 (TCH) west – Winnipeg	Continuation into Manitoba
Kenora	Unorganized Kenora	6.5	4.0		Highway 673 south	Access to Shoal Lake 40 First Nation
Kenora	Unorganized Kenora	29.5	18.3		Lindsay Road	
Kenora	Unorganized Kenora	37.6– 39.6	23.4– 24.6		Highway 17A east – Thunder Bay	Through traffic follows Highway 17A
Kenora	Unorganized Kenora	40.4	25.1		Highway 641 north (Laclu Road)	
Kenora	Kenora	43.4– 63.0	27.0– 39.1		Keewatin / Kenora connecting link agreement	
Kenora	Unorganized Kenora	67.8– 68.1	42.1– 42.3		Highway 17A west – Winnipeg	Through traffic follows Highway 17A
Kenora	Unorganized Kenora	72.2	44.9		Highway 71 south / TCH – Sioux Narrows, Nestor Falls, Fort Frances	
Kenora	Machin	144.6	89.9		Highway 647 north (Blue Lake Road)	Vermillion Bay
Kenora	Machin	146.6	91.1		Highway 105 north (Red Lake Road) – Red Lake	Vermillion Bay
Kenora	Machin	160.9	100.0		Highway 594 east (Five Acres Rest)	
Kenora	Unorganized Kenora	173.8	108.0		Highway 605 north	
Kenora	Unorganized Kenora	185.1	115.0		Highway 665 north (Richan Road)	
Kenora	Dryden	186.5	115.9		Dryden connecting link agreement begins	
Kenora	Dryden	189.6	117.8		Highway 601 north (Colonization Avenue)	
Kenora	Dryden	189.9	118.0		Highway 594 west (Duke Street)	
Kenora	Dryden	191.3	118.9		Dryden connecting link agreement ends	
Kenora	Dryden	194.6	120.9		Highway 601 north (Airport Road) – Rice Lake	
Kenora	Dinorwic	217.4	135.1		Highway 72 north – Sioux Lookout	
Kenora	Borups Corners	228.8	142.2		Highway 603 north – Dyment	
Kenora	Unorganized Kenora	238.3	148.1		Highway 622 south – Atikokan	
Kenora	Ignace	297.0	184.5		Highway 599 north	
Kenora	Unorganized Kenora	307.2	190.9		Gulliver River bridge	
Thunder Bay	Unorganized Thunder Bay	366.1	227.5		Sheba CPR underpass	
Thunder Bay	Unorganized Thunder Bay	386.8	240.3		Little Firesteel River bridge	
Thunder Bay	Shabaqua Corners	474.9	295.1		Highway 11 west (MOM's Way) / TCH – Atikokan, Fort Frances	Western end of Highway 11 Thunder Bay concurrency
Thunder Bay	Sunshine	495.9	308.1		Highway 102 east (Dawson Road)	Highway 102 western terminus
Thunder Bay	Oliver Paipoonge	511.1	317.6		Highway 590 (Hymers Road)	Kakabeka Falls
Thunder Bay	Oliver Paipoonge	517.4	321.5		Highway 588 south – Stanley	
Thunder Bay	Oliver Paipoonge	526.8	327.3		Highway 130 (Arthur Street West) – Rosslyn	Former Highway 11 / Highway 17 alignment
Thunder Bay	Thunder Bay	539.0	334.9		Highway 61 south (Thunder Bay Expressway) – Duluth Harbour Expressway east	Highway 11 / Highway 17 follow Thunder Bay Expressway; MOM's Way eastern terminus
Thunder Bay	Thunder Bay	545.0	338.6		Highway 102 west (Dawson Road) – Kaministiquia	Highway 102 eastern terminus
Thunder Bay	Thunder Bay	551.4	342.6	—	Hodder Avenue / Copenhagen Road	Former Highway 11B west / Highway 17B; eastern end of Thunder Bay Expressway
Thunder Bay	Shuniah	555.2	345.0		Highway 527 north – Armstrong	
Thunder Bay	Shuniah	585.2	363.6		Highway 587 south (Pass Lake Road) – Pass Lake	
Thunder Bay	Unorganized Thunder Bay	621.5	386.2		Highway 582 east (Hurkett Road) – Hurkett	
Thunder Bay	Unorganized Thunder Bay	625.8	388.9		Highway 582 south (Hurkett Road) – Hurkett	
Thunder Bay	Red Rock	641.3	398.5		Highway 628 east – Red Rock	
Thunder Bay	Nipigon	649.7	403.7		Highway 585 north (Cameron Falls Road) – Cameron Falls, Pine Portage	
Thunder Bay	Nipigon	654.5	406.7		Nipigon River Bridge across Nipigon River	
Thunder Bay	Nipigon	655.0	407.0		Highway 11 east / TCH – Greenstone, Cochrane	Eastern end of Highway 11 Thunder Bay concurrency
Thunder Bay	Unorganized Thunder Bay	699.2	434.5		Little Gravel River bridge	
Thunder Bay	Unorganized Thunder Bay	730.4	453.8		Selim CPR underpass	
Thunder Bay	Schreiber	744.9	462.9		Quebec Street	
Thunder Bay	Terrace Bay	748.6	465.2		Heron Bay CPR underpass	
Thunder Bay	Terrace Bay	757.0	470.4		Aquasabon River bridge	
Thunder Bay	Terrace Bay	759.1	471.7		Terrace Bay CPR underpass	
Thunder Bay	Unorganized Thunder Bay	785.7	488.2		Steel River bridge	
Thunder Bay	Unorganized Thunder Bay	807.5	501.8		Little Pic River bridge	
Thunder Bay	Marathon	835.4	519.1		Peninsula Road	Formerly Highway 626 south
Thunder Bay	Marathon	842.1	523.3		Highway 627 south – Heron Bay, Pic River, Pukaskwa National Park	
Thunder Bay	Unorganized Thunder Bay	875.3	543.9		Highway 614 north (Manitouwadge Road)	
Algoma	White River	926.0	575.4		Highway 631 north (Elgin Street)	
Algoma	Wawa	1,015.6	631.1		Highway 101 east – Chapleau, Timmins	No year-round service including fuel between Wawa and Highway 552 junction (200 km)
Algoma	Unorganized North Algoma	1,028.6– 1,117.5	639.1– 694.4		Passes through Lake Superior Provincial Park	
Algoma	Unorganized North Algoma	1,120.9	696.5		Montreal River bridge	
Algoma	Unorganized North Algoma	1,170.8	727.5		Highway 563 – Batchawana Bay	
Algoma	Unorganized North Algoma	1,195.3	742.7		Harmony River bridge	
Algoma	Unorganized North Algoma	1,209.2	751.4		Highway 552 – Goulais Bay	
Algoma	Unorganized North Algoma	1,221.2	758.8		Highway 556 east – Heyden	
Algoma	Sault Ste. Marie	1,225.0	761.2		Beginning of Sault Ste. Marie connecting link agreement	
Algoma	Sault Ste. Marie	1,234.3	767.0		Highway 550 west (Second Line) To I-75 – Sault Ste. Marie (MI) Great Northern Road south	Formerly Highway 17B east
Algoma	Sault Ste. Marie	1,239.3	770.1		Trunk Road	Formerly Highway 17B west
Algoma	Sault Ste. Marie	1,240.3	770.7		End of Sault Ste. Marie connecting link agreement	
Algoma	Sault Ste. Marie	1,244.4	773.2		Highway 17B east – Garden River	
Algoma	Garden River First Nation	1,252.0	778.0	—	Jardun Mine Road	
Algoma	Garden River First Nation	1,253.5	778.9	—	Noonday Drive	
Algoma	Macdonald, Meredith and Aberdeen Additional	1,260.3	783.1		Highway 638 – Echo Bay	
Algoma	Macdonald, Meredith and Aberdeen Additional–Laird boundary	1,265.5	786.3		Highway 17B west (Bar River Road)	
Algoma	Tarbutt	1,280.7	795.8		Highway 548 south – St. Joseph Island	
Algoma	Bruce Mines	1,300.6	808.2		Highway 638 north (Richardson Street)	
Algoma	Thessalon	1,320.2	820.3		Highway 129 north – Chapleau	
Algoma	Huron Shores	1,347.5	837.3		Highway 546 north	Iron Bridge
Algoma	Blind River	1,373.3	853.3		Highway 557 north (Huron Avenue)	
Algoma	North Shore	1,384.3	860.2		Highway 538 east	Algoma Mills
Algoma	North Shore	1,389.1	863.1		Highway 538 west	
Algoma	North Shore	1,403.7	872.2		Highway 108 north (Elliot Lake Road) – Elliot Lake	Serpent River
Sudbury	Sables-Spanish Rivers	1,443.7	897.1		Highway 553 north (Imperial Street)	Massey
Sudbury	Baldwin	1,469.6	913.2		Highway 6 south – Espanola, Manitoulin Island	McKerrow
Sudbury	Greater Sudbury	1,503.8	934.4		Municipal Road 4 north (Fairbank Lake Road)	Formerly Highway 658 north
Sudbury	Greater Sudbury	1,505.9	935.7		Municipal Road 55 east – Whitefish	Beginning of freeway segment; former Highway 17 east
Sudbury	Greater Sudbury	1,520.5	944.8	—	Highway 144 north (Northwest Bypass) – Timmins	
Sudbury	Greater Sudbury	1,525.6	948.0	—	Municipal Road 55 – Lively	End of freeway segment; beginning of Southwest Bypass; former Highway 17
Sudbury	Greater Sudbury	1,535.5	954.1	—	Municipal Road 80 (Long Lake Road)	
Sudbury	Greater Sudbury	1,538.9	956.2	—	Highway 69 / TCH – Toronto; Municipal Road 46 north (Regent Street)	End of Southwest Bypass; beginning of Southeast Bypass
Sudbury	Greater Sudbury	1,550.0	963.1		Municipal Road 55 west (Kingsway)	End of Southeast Bypass; former Highway 17 west
Sudbury	Greater Sudbury	1,552.9	964.9		Municipal Road 93 south (Second Avenue) – Coniston	
Sudbury	Greater Sudbury	1,553.4	965.2		Municipal Road 90 north (Garson Coniston Road) – Garson	
Sudbury	Greater Sudbury	1,558.1	968.2		Municipal Road 537 south – Wahnapitae	Formerly Highway 537 south
Sudbury	Markstay-Warren	1,579.1	981.2		Markstay Road / Main Street	Future end of freeway segment in current expansion plans
Sudbury	Markstay-Warren	1,589.4	987.6		Highway 535 – Rivière Veuve, St. Charles, Noëlville	Hagar
Sudbury	Markstay-Warren	1,597.8	992.8		Highway 539 north – River Valley	Warren
Nipissing	West Nipissing	1,611.4	1,001.3		Highway 575 north – Field	Verner
Nipissing	West Nipissing	1,612.4	1,001.9		Highway 64 south – Lavigne, Noëlville	Western end of Highway 64 concurrency
Nipissing	West Nipissing	1,627.5	1,011.3		Leblanc Road	Beginning of Sturgeon Falls connecting link agreement
Nipissing	West Nipissing	1,629.0	1,012.2		Highway 64 north – Field	Eastern end of Highway 64 concurrency
Nipissing	West Nipissing	1,629.9	1,012.8		Nipissing Street	End of Sturgeon Falls connecting link agreement
Nipissing	Nipissing First Nation	1,661.8	1,032.6		Highway 17B east (Main Street West)	
Nipissing	North Bay	1,665.5	1,034.9		Highway 11 (Algonquin Avenue) / TCH – Timmins, Cochrane	Western end of Highway 11 North Bay concurrency; former Highway 11B south
Nipissing	North Bay	1,667.8	1,036.3		Highway 63 north (Trout Lake Road / Cassels Street) – Temiscaming	Formerly Highway 17B west
Nipissing	North Bay	1,669.6	1,037.4		Highway 11 south – Toronto	Eastern end of Highway 11 North Bay concurrency; Highway 11 exit 344
Nipissing	East Ferris	1,680.2	1,044.0		Highway 94 south – Corbeil	
Nipissing	Bonfield	1,692.9	1,051.9		Highway 531 south – Bonfield	
Nipissing	Calvin	1,710.6	1,062.9		Highway 630 south – Kiosk	Eau Claire Station
Nipissing	Mattawa	1,729.6	1,074.7		Highway 533 north (Main Street)	
Renfrew	Head, Clara and Maria	1,763.7	1,095.9		Deux-Rivières CPR underpass	
Renfrew	Head, Clara and Maria	1,799.7	1,118.3		Stonecliffe CPR overpass	
Renfrew	Laurentian Hills	1,814.9	1,127.7		County Road 635 north (Swisha Road)	Rolphton; location of Nuclear Power Demonstration, the first CANDU reactor; formerly Highway 635 north
Renfrew	Deep River	1,833.2	1,139.1		County Road 72 east (Ridge Road)	
Renfrew	Deep River	1,834.1	1,139.7		County Road 73 north (Deep River Road)	
Renfrew	Petawawa	1,861.6	1,156.7		County Road 55 east (Paquette Road)	
Renfrew	Petawawa	1,863.6	1,158.0		County Road 37 east (Murphy Road)	
Renfrew	Petawawa	1,870.2	1,162.1		County Road 26 (Doran Road)	
Renfrew	Laurentian Valley	1,873.2	1,164.0		County Road 42 east (Forest Lea Road)	
Renfrew	Laurentian Valley	1,877.5	1,166.6		County Road 58 (Round Lake Road)	Formerly Highway 62 west / Highway 148 east
Renfrew	Pembroke	1,883.3	1,170.2		Highway 41 (Paul Martin Drive) – Eganville, Pembroke	
Renfrew	Laurentian Valley	1,873.2	1,164.0		County Road 24 (White Water Road)	
Renfrew	Whitewater Region	1,894.4	1,177.1		County Road 40 east (Greenwood Road)	Beginning of proposed realignment of Highway 17
Renfrew	Whitewater Region	1,899.0	1,180.0		County Road 13 south (Mountain Road)	
Renfrew	Whitewater Region	1,911.0	1,187.4		County Road 8 west (Main Street)	Cobden
Renfrew	Whitewater Region	1,912.3	1,188.2		County Road 7 east (Foresters Falls Road)	
Renfrew	Whitewater Region	1,923.0	1,194.9		County Road 653 east – Chenaux; County Road 61 west (Godfrey Road) – Haley Station	Formerly Highway 653 east
Renfrew	Horton	1,930.2	1,199.4		County Road 4 west (Storyland Road)	
Renfrew	Horton	1,934.7	1,202.2		County Road 20 (Castleford Road / Bruce Street)	Future interchange
Renfrew	Renfrew	1,937.4	1,203.8		Highway 60 west (O'Brien Road) – Huntsville, Algonquin Provincial Park	Future interchange
Renfrew	Horton	1,939.8	1,205.3		County Road 6 (Gillan Road / Lochwinnoch Road)	Future interchange
Renfrew	McNab/Braeside	1,948.2	1,210.6		County Road 63 (Miller Road / Anderson Road)	
Renfrew	McNab/Braeside	1,950.3	1,211.9	194	County Road 508 west (Calabogie Road) – Calabogie; County Road 54 east (McLean Drive) – Glasgow Station, Braeside	Formerly Highway 508 west
Renfrew	McNab/Braeside	1,953.3	1,213.7	—	Highway 417 east / TCH – Arnprior, Ottawa	Freeway begins; continues east as Highway 417
Gap in route
Ottawa		2,033.2	1,263.4	—	Road 174 begins Highway 417 / TCH – Ottawa, Cornwall, Montreal	The Split; Highway 417 exit 113A; former Highway 17 follows Road 174; beginning of freeway
Ottawa		2,034.3	1,264.1	—	Road 27 (Blair Road)	
Ottawa		2,036.9	1,265.7	—	Road 34 (Montreal Road)	Formerly Highway 17B west
Ottawa		2,041.1	1,268.3	—	Road 47 (Jeanne d'Arc Boulevard)	
Ottawa		2,043.1	1,269.5	—	Road 84 (Place d'Orléans Drive); Road 39 (Champlain Street)	
Ottawa		2,044.5	1,270.4	—	Road 47 (Tenth Line Road)	
Ottawa		2,046.5	1,271.6		Road 57 (Trim Road)	At-grade; end of freeway
Ottawa–Prescott and Russell boundary	Ottawa–Clarence-Rockland boundary	2,059.5	1,279.7		Ottawa Road 174 ends Prescott and Russell County Road 17 begins	
Prescott and Russell	Hawkesbury	2,119.6	1,317.1	—	Highway 34 – Hawkesbury, Vankleek Hill	
Prescott and Russell	East Hawkesbury	2,129.3	1,323.1		Highway 417 east / TCH – Montreal	Former Highway 17 eastern terminus; westbound exit and eastbound entrance; Highway 417 exit 9
1.000 mi = 1.609 km; 1.000 km = 0.621 mi: Closed/former; Concurrency terminus; Route transition

== Notes ==
Trans-Canada Highway
Previous routes MB Provincial Trunk Highway 1 Highway 11	Highway 17	Next routes Highway 71 Highway 11 Highway 69 Highway 417
