= Nipigon =

- Township (single-tier)
- Township of Nipigon
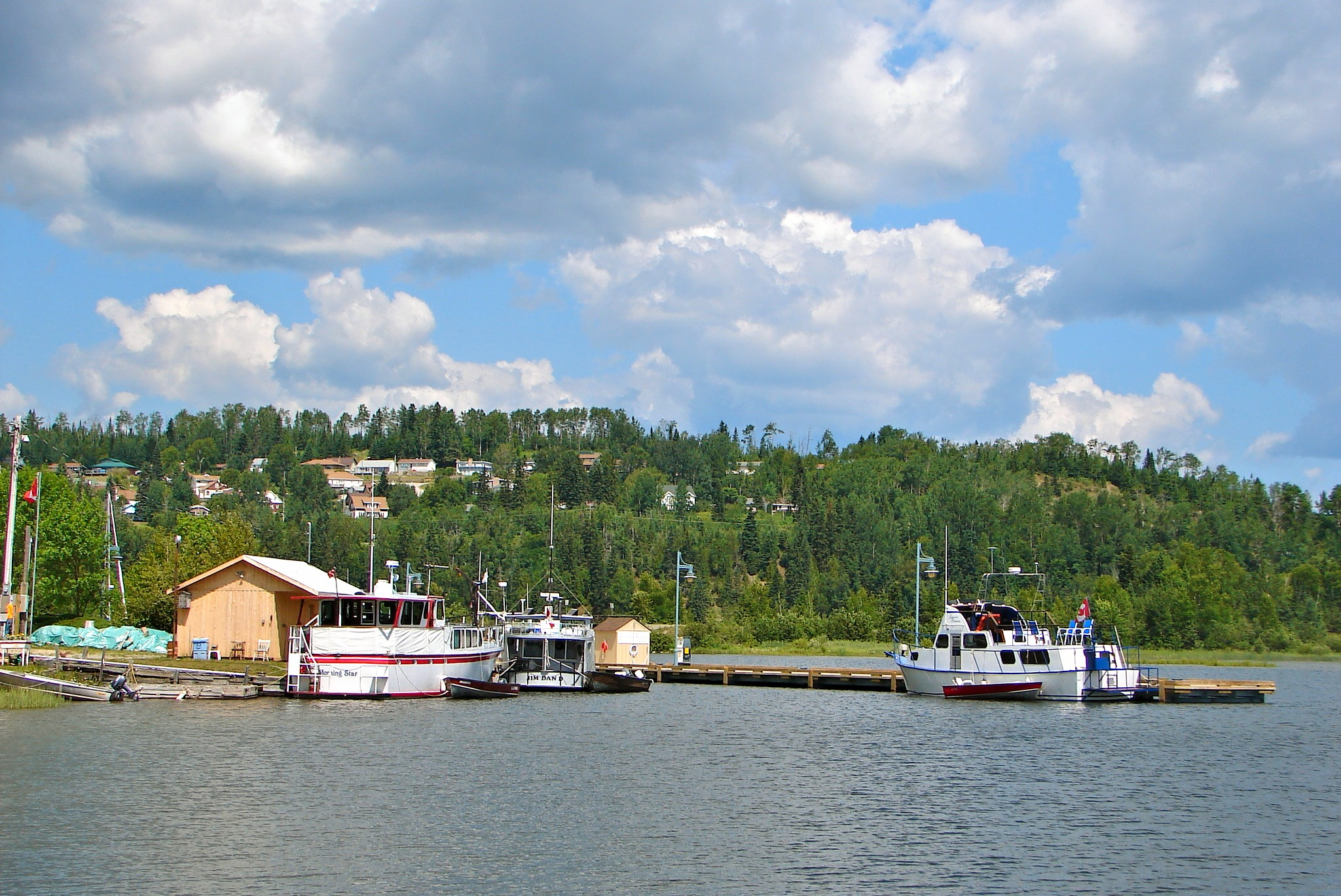
- Nickname: "The Lakehead"
- Location within Ontario
- Coordinates: 49°00′55″N 88°16′06″W
- Country: Canada
- Province: Ontario
- District: Thunder Bay
- Incorporated: 1908

Government
  - Mayor: Suzanne Kukko
  - Federal riding: Thunder Bay—Superior North
  - Prov. riding: Thunder Bay—Superior North

Area
  - Land: 107.94 km^{2} (41.68 sq mi)

Population (2021)
  - Total: 1,473
  - Density: 13.6/km^{2} (35/sq mi)
- Time zone: UTC−5 (EST)
  - Summer (DST): UTC−4 (EDT)
- Postal Code: P0T 2J0
- Area code: 807
- Website: nipigon.net

Nipigon (/ˈnɪpɪɡən/) is a town in Nipigon township in Thunder Bay District, Northwestern Ontario, Canada, located along the west side of the Nipigon River and south of the small Helen Lake running between Lake Nipigon and Lake Superior. Lake Nipigon is located approximately 25 kilometres (16 mi) north of Nipigon. Located at latitude 49.0125° N, Nipigon is the northernmost community on the Great Lakes.

A communications tower near Nipigon broadcasts a local radio station and television channels from Thunder Bay, including CKPR (TBT), CFNO and CBQT.

The Nipigon Crater or Crater Nipigon on Mars is named after this town.

== Geography ==
Nipigon is located northeast of Thunder Bay, southwest of Geraldton and Beardmore (both in the municipality of Greenstone), west of Marathon, and northwest of Sault Ste. Marie.

Nipigon is surrounded with pine and other varieties of forests.

== History ==
First Nations have lived in the Nipigon area for thousands of years, leaving behind rock paintings on the cliffs at the mouth of the Nipigon River.

During the European colonization, the area was home to a succession of fur trading forts and posts. Starting in 1665, French explorers built several forts on Lake Nipigon. Circa 1717, Zacharie Robutel de La Noue built Fort Ste Anne, its exact location now uncertain but possibly in a shallow bay on the south-east shore of Helen Lake (at the site of today's Lake Helen 53A reserve). It operated until 1775.

The North West Company had a post at the mouth of the Nipigon River from 1785 to 1821, which was likely taken over by the Hudson's Bay Company (HBC) when these two companies merged in 1821.

In the fall of 1859, the Hudson's Bay Company (HBC) set up a trading post at the waterfront of the current townsite, called Pierre Rouge or Roche Rouge (French for Red Rock). Built to protect trade at its post on Lake Nipigon, Fort Nipigon, it functioned as a transshipment point for cargo that was brought up the Great Lakes by steamers and then taken by canoe up the Nipigon River to Fort Nipigon. It was an outpost for Fort William until circa 1864, when it became an outpost of Fort Nipigon. It remained a small outpost with 2 or 3 dilapidated log cabins until 1871, when Red Rock was made headquarters of the Nipigon District. It was then rebuilt, expanded, and became a full post. From 1881 to 1887, Red Rock was the headquarters of the Michipicoten District, and from 1892 on, headquarters of the Lake Superior District.

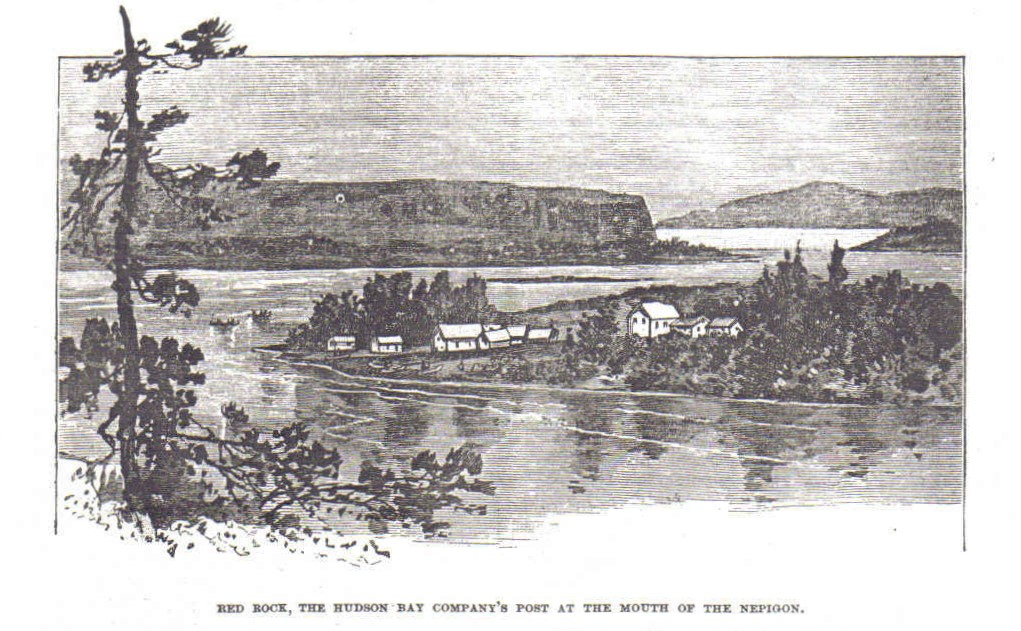
Red Rock HBC post, 1889

In 1885, the Canadian Pacific Railway (CPR) tracks were completed across the north shore of Lake Superior, boosting trade at the HBC post. But since the post was along the river, trade gradually shifted to new businesses built closer to the railroad. In 1899, the HBC built a retail shop across from the railway station in order to compete.

To avoid confusion with another Red Rock locality in eastern Ontario, the HBC post was renamed to Nipigon (or Nepigon) in 1900, taking the name of the CPR station. As a consequence, the Nipigon post on Lake Nipigon was renamed to Nipigon House. In 1902, the trading post burnt down and the Lake Superior District headquarters were moved to Fort William. Although fur trade had ceased, the retail store prospered due to increased business from tourists arriving by train. In 1910, HBC resumed fur trade in order to compete with another fur trade company, Revillon Frères, that had a post on Front Street from 1905 to 1916.

In 1908, Nipigon Township was incorporated, and the next year the first municipal elections were held with McKirdy elected as mayor. In the 1910s, the Canadian Northern Railway was built through the township and opened for passenger service in 1915 (all traffic on this line ceased by 2005 and the rails were removed in 2010).

In 1937, the bridge for the Trans-Canada Highway was built over the Nipigon River.

In 1938, the HBC operations at Nipigon were transferred to the Small Stores Division, and transferred again in 1961 to the Northern Stores Department. HBC divested this department in 1987 to The North West Company, and the store has closed since then.

=== Mill fire ===
On February 6, 2007, a devastating fire ripped through Multiply Forest Products, burning the mill to the ground. The mill was the main employer in the town. Less than a month earlier workers at the mill had purchased it from Columbia Forest Products of Portland, Oregon. At the time of the sale, a $4-million modernization plan for the mill was also announced. More than 100 people were employed at the plant, which produced hardwood underlayment for vinyl, plywood and laminate flooring.

== Demographics ==
In the 2021 Census of Population conducted by Statistics Canada, Nipigon had a population of 1,473 living in 663 of its 747 total private dwellings, a change of −10.3% from its 2016 population of 1,642. With a land area of 107.94 km^{2} (41.68 sq mi), it had a population density of 13.6/km^{2} (35.3/sq mi) in 2021.

Canada census – Nipigon community profile

	2021	2016	2011
Population	1,473 (-10.3% from 2016)	1,642 (+0.7% from 2011)	1,631 (-6.9% from 2006)
Land area	107.94 km^{2} (41.68 sq mi)	109.11 km^{2} (42.13 sq mi)	109.14 km^{2} (42.14 sq mi)
Population density	13.6/km^{2} (35/sq mi)	15.0/km^{2} (39/sq mi)	14.9/km^{2} (39/sq mi)
Median age	51.6 (M: 50.8, F: 52.0)	48.6 (M: 47.9, F: 49.2)	47.9 (M: 48.2, F: 47.2)
Private dwellings	747 (total) 663 (occupied)	804 (total) 721 (occupied)	823 (total) 713 (occupied)
Median household income	$71,500	$57,062

References: 2021 2016 2011

Nipigon, Township - Historical populations

Year	Pop.	±%
1921	496	—
1931	731	+47.4%
1941	1,180	+61.4%
1951	1,773	+50.3%
1956	2,304	+29.9%
1961	2,618	+13.6%
1966	2,702	+3.2%
1971	2,637	−2.4%
1976	2,724	+3.3%

Year	Pop.	±%
1981	2,681	−1.6%
1986	2,430	−9.4%
1991	2,338	−3.8%
1996	2,210	−5.5%
2001	1,964	−11.1%
2006	1,752	−10.8%
2011	1,631	−6.9%
2016	1,642	+0.7%
2021	1,473	−10.3%

Population counts are not adjusted for boundary changes.
Source: Statistics Canada

== Economy ==
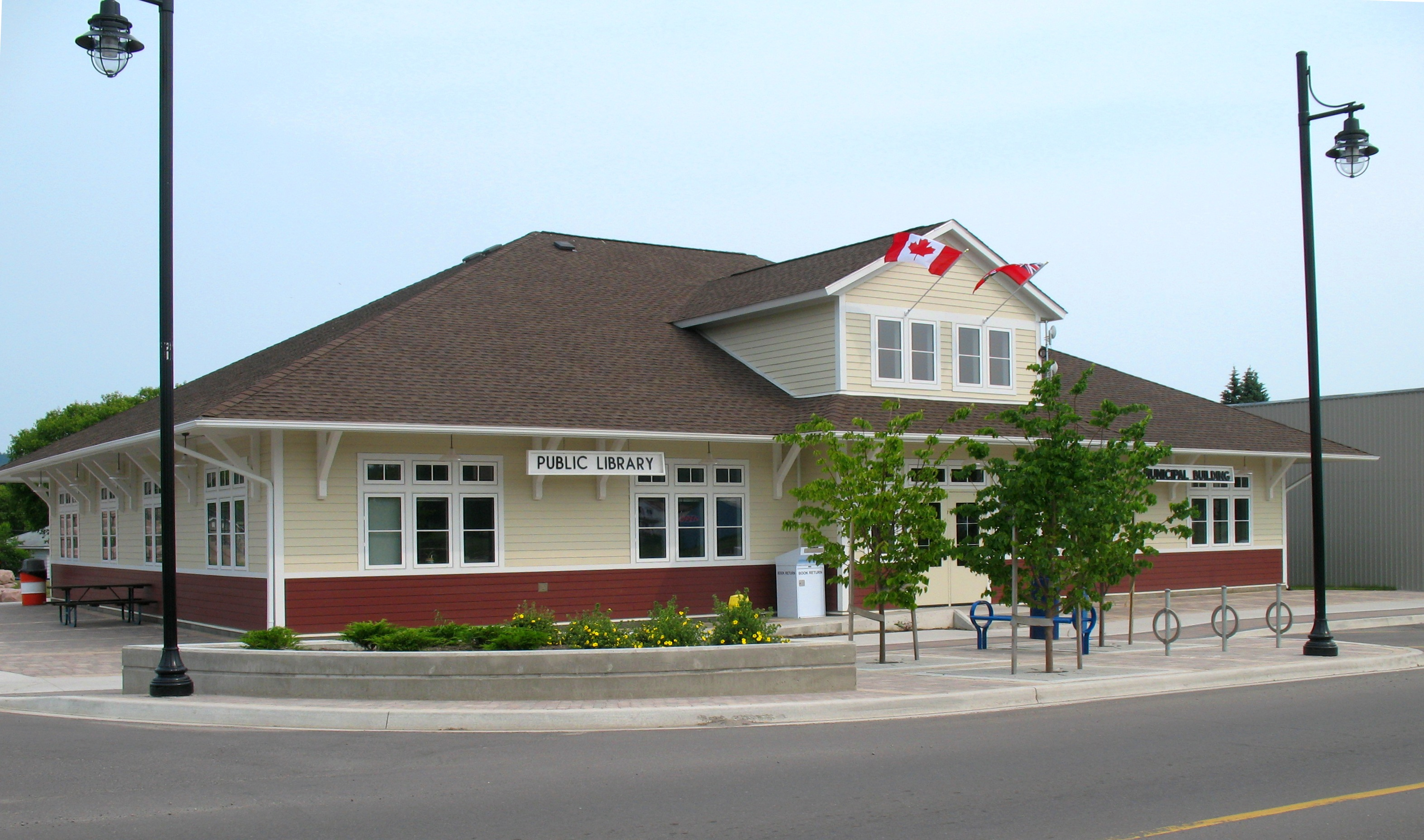
Nipigon Public Library

The chief industries in Nipigon are forest products, fishing, and tourism. Timbering has been common sporadically to the north, the northwest and further north within Lake Nipigon basin, along with parts of the southwest.

Nipigon is a setting off point for fishing excursions onto Lake Superior and the Nipigon River system leading up to Lake Nipigon. Fish varieties common to this area include Atlantic salmon, lake trout, speckled trout (the world's largest speckled trout was caught in the Nipigon River in 1915, weighing in at 14.5 pounds (6.6 kg)), rainbow trout, walleye, northern pike, bass, and perch.

== Recreation ==
Nipigon and the surrounding area have a wide array of outdoor recreational activities for all times of the year. A select number of cliffs in the Nipigon area are being developed into rock climbing destinations.

== Transportation ==
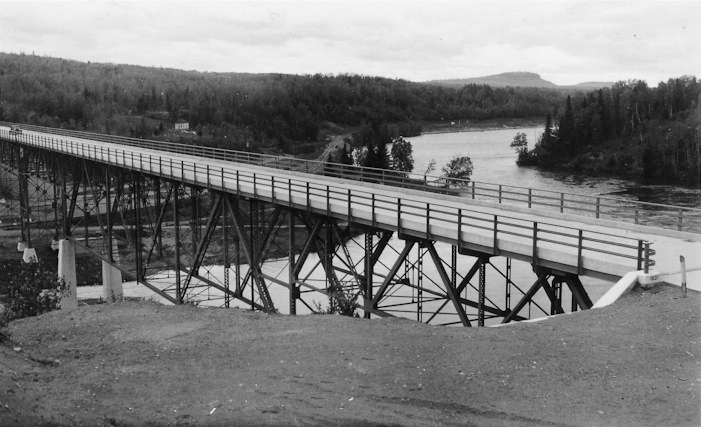
The Nipigon River Bridge, originally opened in 1937, forms the narrowest transportation bottleneck between the Atlantic and Pacific oceans in Canada.

Nipigon is served by several transportation corridors:

- Highway 11
- Highway 17, both part of the Trans-Canada Highway
- Canadian Pacific Railway

There are two bridges at the east end of town spanning the Nipigon River: one is a single-track railway bridge for the Canadian Pacific Railway, and the other is a two-lane highway bridge constructed by the Province of Ontario. With the exception of the Canadian National Railway transcontinental rail line, the two bridges are the narrowest east-west land link in Canada's transportation system. Both Highways 11 and 17 and the Canadian Pacific Railway route all their traffic across those bridges.

The Nipigon River Bridge is a pair of two-lane cable-stayed bridges, the first of their kind in Ontario, replacing the 1937 bridge. On January 10, 2016, the first bridge heaved apart but did not collapse, resulting in traffic having to reroute through the United States. However, one lane was re-opened to traffic 17 hours later.

Nipigon has Ontario Northland motor coach service on its Sault Ste. Marie–Thunder Bay route.

== Notable people ==
Nipigon is the birthplace of two time world curling champion Allan A. "Al" (the Iceman) Hackner, who won The Brier in 1982 and 1985.

== See also ==
- List of townships in Ontario
