= Nipigon River Bridge =

Nipigon River Bridge (2015)
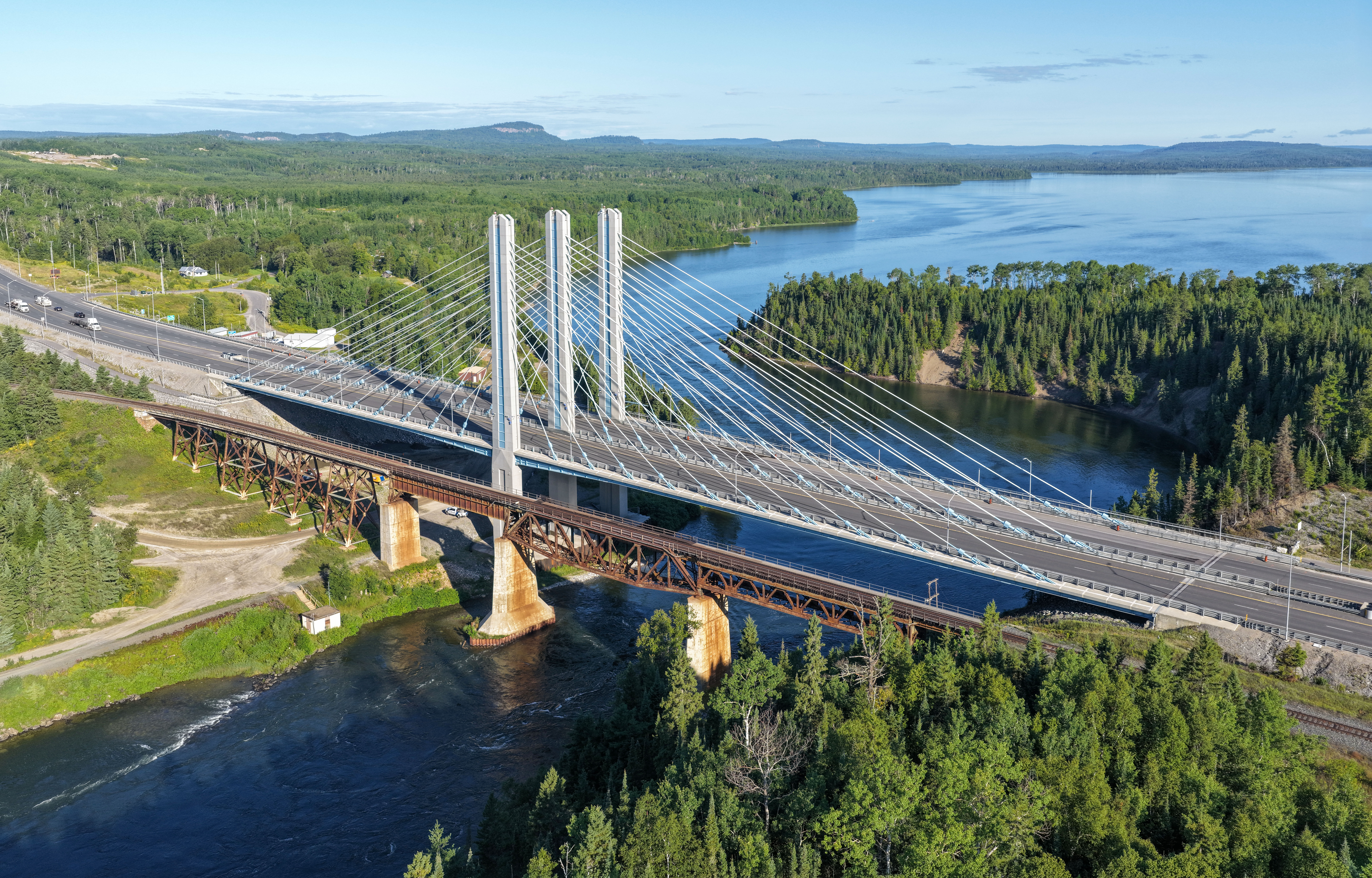
- Coordinates: 49.0196°N 88.2504°W
- Carries: 4 lanes of Highway 11 / Highway 17 / TCH
- Crosses: Nipigon River
- Locale: Nipigon, Ontario
- Maintained by: Ministry of Transportation of Ontario

Characteristics
- Design: Cable-stayed
- Total length: 252 metres (827 ft)
- Width: 37 metres (121 ft)
- Height: 75 metres (246 ft)
- No. of spans: 2

History
- Designer: McCormick Rankin (MRC)
- Constructed by: Bot Construction and Ferrovial Agroman
- Construction start: 2013
- Construction end: November 25, 2018
- Construction cost: $106 million
- Opened: November 29, 2015 (westbound bridge)
- Replaces: Nipigon River Bridge (1937, 1974)

Location
- Interactive map of Nipigon River Bridge (2015)

The Nipigon River Bridge is a cable-stayed bridge in Canada carrying Highway 11 and Highway 17, designated as part of the Trans-Canada Highway, across the Nipigon River near Nipigon, Ontario.

== History ==
A steel deck truss road bridge was built at the site in 1937, parallel to an existing Canadian Pacific Railway bridge.

In 1974, the original bridge was replaced with a steel plate girder structure. The 1974 bridge was rehabilitated in the mid-2000s, which involved replacing the old Jersey-style concrete parapets with steel guardrail which offers a less obstructed view of the river, and adding a pedestrian walkway on the north side of the structure. The 1974 bridge was demolished by Priestly Demolition from 2015 to 2016, to make way for the second span of the new cable-stayed bridge (see below). The dismantling project won two honours at the 2016 World Demolition Awards, the Civils Demolition Award and the top prize which was the World Demolition Award, as "[i]t turns out that dismantling a bridge perched over icy waters in the midst of a northwestern Ontario winter is no easy matter".

== New bridge ==
A $106 million project to replace the 1974 bridge began in 2013 as part of a region-wide project to widen the Trans-Canada Highway to four lanes. The cable-stayed design for the twin bridges, with two parallel spans carrying four total lanes, was to be the first of its kind in Ontario. The future westbound bridge opened on November 29, 2015; both directions of traffic were shifted onto the new bridge to prepare the old span for demolition. The eastbound span was scheduled for completion in 2017. The eastbound span was completed in 2018, and the bridge fully opened to 2 lanes of traffic in each direction at the end of November 2018.

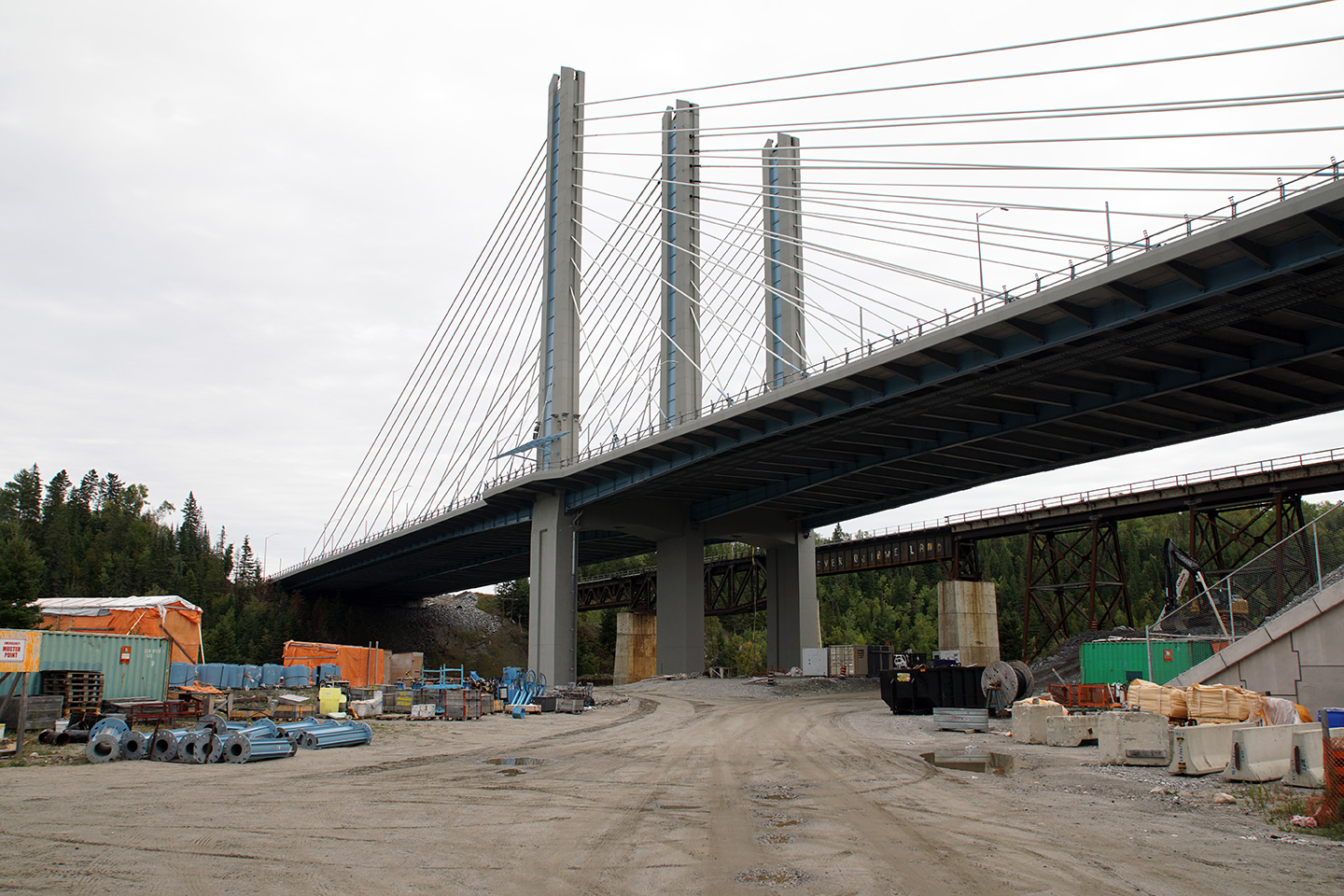
Underneath the new cable stayed bridge, with the railway bridge in the background.

=== Closure of new bridge ===
Since the bridge is asymmetric, with a longer eastern span, the western side of the bridge must be held down to balance the tension in the main cables. That is done using three sliding bearings, which hold main deck girders down to the concrete abutment while allowing lengthwise motion to act as an expansion joint.

On January 10, 2016, the new bridge was closed to traffic after all 40 M22 (7/8 in) bolts attaching a main deck girder to the northwest bearing failed during a winter storm, causing the deck to lift by 60 centimetres (24 in), resulting in the indefinite closure of the Trans-Canada Highway at the bridge. As the bridge is a single point of failure in Canada's National Highway System, its closure cut Canada's road network in two halves and effectively required vehicles travelling between eastern and western Canada to detour through the United States. The deputy mayor of Greenstone, 125 kilometres (78 mi) northeast of the bridge, declared a state of emergency for the municipality as a result of the closure.

The bridge was partially reopened to traffic the following morning, after 17 hours of closure, using one lane alternating between directions. The Ministry of Transportation inspected the bridge for further damage and determined that it would be able to handle cars and regular-weight transport trucks in the interim. 200 metric tons (200 long tons; 220 short tons) of concrete Jersey barriers were placed to weigh down the deck.

Among the several points on the Trans-Canada Highway with only one crossing, all of which are in Northwestern Ontario, the two-lane Nipigon River Bridge was the longest. It was estimated that over $100 million of goods per day shipped within Canada by truck were delayed by the bridge closure.

A temporary fix was performed, a hold-down support system securing the steel girders to the bridge structure with a hanger system. The bridge fully reopened to one lane in each direction on February 25, 2016, although the exact cause of the failure was not fully known.

Demolition of the old bridge and construction of the second span also resumed in February 2016.

On September 22, 2016, the Ministry of Transportation released several reports on the technical causes of the January 10, 2016 bearing failure. Two reports, from Surface Science Western and the National Research Council, were released pertaining solely to the analysis of the failed bolts connecting the bearing to the bridge girders. They both found that the bolts met all required standards and failed progressively because of severe overloading beyond their capacities. The second component of the analysis involved an engineering evaluation, undertaken by ministry bridge engineers and an independent engineering consultant. They both found that there were three main causes for the failure:

1. The shoe plate, which connects the bearing to the girder, was too flexible—creating "prying action" which amplified the forces on some bolts.
2. The bearings could not properly rotate to accommodate non-parallelism between the deck girders and the concrete abutment, increasing the load on one end of the bearing.
3. The bolts were not properly tightened, subjecting the bolts to fatigue.

The ministry also revealed that the permanent repair to the bridge would involve a "linkage" system that would hold down the bridge and allow horizontal movements because of thermal expansion and the contraction of the bridge superstructure.

== See also ==
- List of bridges in Canada
