= Wanup =

- Dispersed rural community
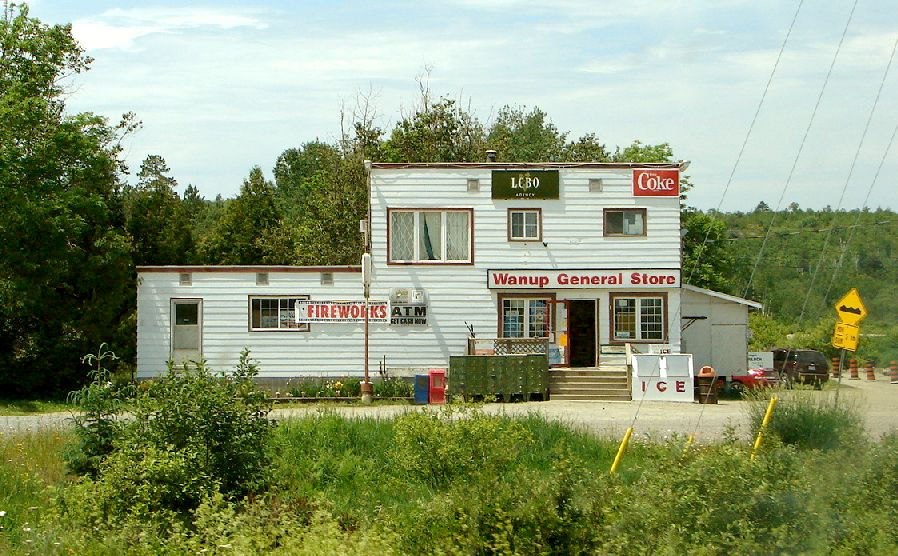
- Wanup General Store

- Location within City of Greater Sudbury Location within Ontario
- Coordinates: 46°22′53″N 80°49′37″W
- Country: Canada
- Province: Ontario
- Municipality: Greater Sudbury
- Ward: 9
- Annexed: 2001

Government
  - City Councillor: Deb McIntosh
  - MPs: Viviane Lapointe (Liberal)
  - MPPs: France Gélinas (NDP)
- Elevation: 229 m (751 ft)
- Time zone: UTC-5 (Eastern Time Zone)
  - Summer (DST): UTC-4 (Eastern Time Zone)
- Postal Code FSA: P0M
- Area code: 705, 249

Wanup is a dispersed rural community and unincorporated place in the geographic township of Dill in the southeast of the city of Greater Sudbury, Ontario, Canada. Wanup became part of Greater Sudbury on January 1, 2001, when that city was created by amalgamating the former Regional Municipality of Sudbury, to which the townships of Dill and Cleland (along with other townships) were added.

== Geography ==
The community is located along Highway 537, near the interchange with Highway 69. It is on the right bank of the Wanapitei River.

The smaller community of St. Cloud, which is treated as part of Wanup for postal delivery and telephone exchange purposes, is located a few kilometres north of Wanup, on the opposite bank of the Wanapitei River, in the geographic township of Cleland.

== History ==
Settlement of Wanup dates back to the early 1900s, when large numbers of Finns arrived in Canada. Leaving their homeland to escape the political instability of the time and the spectre of war with Russia many Finns chose this area to resume their primarily agricultural lifestyles. This area was popular among the Finns due to the geographical similarities with many parts of Finland. Another important factor was the abundance of available work from the construction of the CN and CP rail lines which pass through the area. Wanup has acted as base for many generations of Finnish Canadians and still retains a high number of Finnish families.

On June 2, 2013, a rail bridge crossing the Wanapitei River at Wanup collapsed, causing a train derailment.
