= Ontario Highway 538 =

Ontario provincial highway

Highway 538

Route information
- Maintained by Ministry of Transportation of Ontario
- Length: 5.4 km (3.4 mi)
- Existed: 1956–present

Major junctions
- West end: Highway 17 at Algoma Mills
- East end: Highway 17 between Algoma Mills and Pronto

Location
- Country: Canada
- Province: Ontario
- Towns: North Shore

Highway system
- Ontario provincial highways; Current; Former; 400-series
← Highway 537	→ Highway 539

Secondary Highway 538, commonly referred to as Highway 538, is a provincially maintained highway in the Canadian province of Ontario. The highway is 5.6 kilometres (3.5 mi) in length and follows an older alignment of Highway 17 east of Blind River and near the village of Algoma Mills, between the Canadian Pacific Railway tracks and the shoreline of the North Channel of Lake Huron, while the present Highway 17 runs north of the railway tracks. The route was designated in 1956 and has remained unchanged since.

== Route description ==
Highway 538 is a short and narrow highway which follows a former alignment of Highway 17, at which it begins and ends. It starts in the west at Algoma Mills, travelling east initially before turning south and passing beneath a CPR rail line. The route descends along the western bank of Lauzon Creek before turning southeast and crossing it. It passes several shops and continues towards the shoreline, at which point it curves northeast. The highway travels around Bootlegger's Bay before diverging from the shoreline, turning north and ascending towards Highway 17. From this point until its eastern terminus, the highway travels alongside a parcel of the North Channel Inshore Provincial Park, a waterway park scattered along the North Channel shoreline. Immediately south of Highway 17 and the CPR tracks, the route curves east and follows parallel to Highway 17 for several kilometres. Following this, it abruptly curves north, crosses the railway tracks and ends.

Like other provincial routes in Ontario, Highway 538 is maintained by the Ministry of Transportation of Ontario. In 2016, traffic surveys conducted by the ministry showed that on average, 150 vehicles used the highway daily along the section between Highway 17 and Miranda Boulevard in Algoma Mills while 60 vehicles did so each day along the section east of there, the highest and lowest counts along the highway, respectively.

== History ==
Highway 538 was designated in 1956. It was once an alignment of Highway 17, but was bypassed due to several sharp corners. The route has not changed since it was designated.

== Major intersections ==
The following table lists the major junctions along Highway 538. The entirety of the highway is located within Algoma District.

Location	km	Destinations	Notes
Algoma Mills	0.0	Highway 17 – Sault Saint Marie, Massey	Trans-Canada Highway
Algoma Mills	0.8	Miranda Boulevard	
Township of North Shore	5.4	Highway 17 – Sudbury, Massey	Trans-Canada Highway
1.000 mi = 1.609 km; 1.000 km = 0.621 mi
