= Wanapitei River =

River in Ontario, Canada

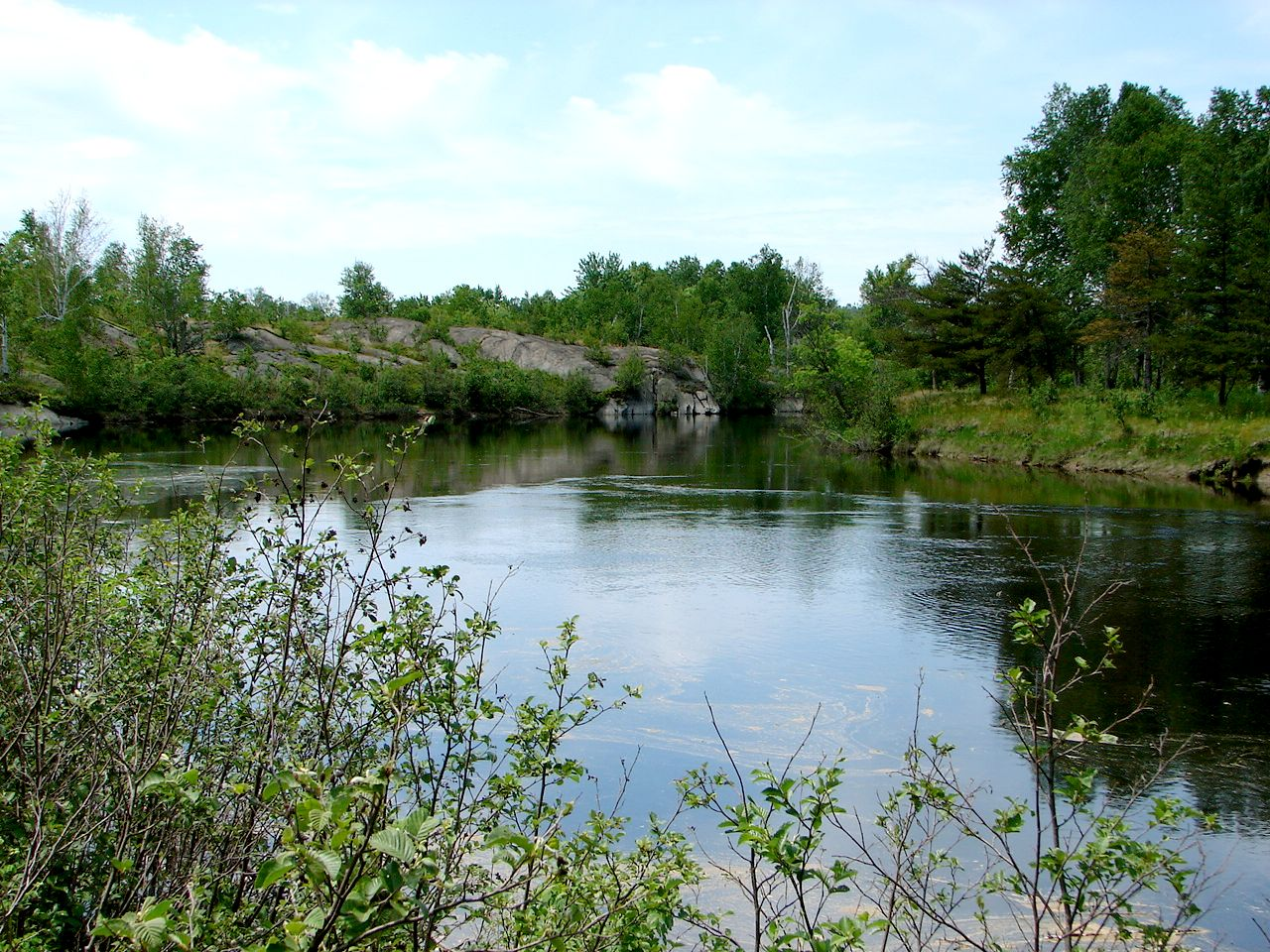
- Wanapitei River near Wanup

- Location of the mouth of the Wanapitei River in Ontario
- Etymology: from the Ojibwa waanabidebiing for "concave-tooth [shaped] water"

Location
- Country: Canada
- Province: Ontario
- Region: Northeastern Ontario
- District: Sudbury

Physical characteristics
- Source: Scotia Lake
  - location: 10 km west of McKee's Camp
  - coordinates: 47°07′54″N 81°23′27″W
  - elevation: 399 m (1,309 ft)
- Mouth: French River
  - location: 8 km WSW of Hartley Bay
  - coordinates: 46°01′34″N 80°51′37″W
  - elevation: 182 m (597 ft)
- Length: 120 km (75 mi)

Basin features
- River system: Great Lakes Basin
- Tributaries
  - left: East Wanapitei River

The Wanapitei River (French: Rivière Wanapitei) is a river in Northeastern Ontario, Canada. It is in the Great Lakes Basin and is a right tributary of the French River.

The river's source is Scotia Lake, a small lake 20 kilometres (10 mi) east of Halfway Lake Provincial Park in Sudbury District. From there, it flows north and east, taking in two small tributaries and continuing to a point 20 kilometres southwest of the Ishpatina Ridge, where it turns south. After approximately 60 kilometres, the river flows into Lake Wanapitei in the northeastern portion of Greater Sudbury. At the south end of the lake, the river continues, flowing south until it joins the French River near the latter's mouth on Georgian Bay on Lake Huron. The river is approximately 120 kilometres (70 mi) in length and is a popular wilderness canoeing route.

Ontario Power Generation operates three hydroelectric generating stations on the river as well as one control dam, at Wanapitei Lake.

The river's name comes from the Ojibwa word waanabidebiing, or "concave-tooth [shaped] water", which describes the shape of Lake Wanapitei. A community which takes its name from the river is spelled Wahnapitae. However, the Wanapitei spelling is correct for both the lake and the river.

On June 2, 2013, a rail bridge crossing the Wanapitei River at Wanup collapsed, causing a train derailment.

== See also ==
- List of rivers of Ontario
