= Nickel Centre =

- Dissolved municipality (lower-tier)
- Location of Nickel Centre (red) compared to the rest of the Sudbury Region until 2000.
- Country: Canada
- Province: Ontario
- City: Greater Sudbury
- Wards: 7, 9
- Incorporated: 1 January 1973
- Dissolved: 31 December 2000

Government
  - City Councillor: Natalie Labbée, Shawn Poland
  - Governing Body: Greater Sudbury City Council
  - MPs: Viviane Lapointe (Liberal)
  - MPPs: France Gélinas (NDP)

Population (2011)Statistics Canada
  - Total: 13,232
- Population computed by combining Census Tracts 5800100.00, 5800101.00 and 5800102.00
- Time zone: UTC-5 (EST)
  - Summer (DST): UTC-4 (EDT)
- Postal Code FSA: P0M, P3L
- Area code: 705

Nickel Centre (1996 census population 13,017) was a town in Ontario, Canada, which existed from 1973 to 2000.

It was created as part of the Regional Municipality of Sudbury. On 1 January 2001, the town and the Regional Municipality were dissolved and amalgamated into the city of Greater Sudbury. The town is now divided between Wards 7 and 9 on Greater Sudbury City Council, and is represented by councillors Natalie Labbée and Shawn Poland.

In the 2011 Canadian census, the Garson-Falconbridge corridor within Nickel Centre was counted as part of the population centre (or urban area) of Sudbury, while the census tracts corresponding to the former boundaries of Nickel Centre had a population of 13,232. In the Canada 2016 Census, the boundaries of the Sudbury population centre were revised to retain Garson but exclude Falconbridge, while a new population centre was added for Coniston (population 1,814).

== Communities ==
=== Coniston ===
Coniston was a part of the geographic Neelon Township, which was named after Sylvester Neelon. The first settlers in the Coniston area were the Butler family, who arrived in 1902. They were joined by five other families by 1904, who created their own farms. Common crops included hay, rye, and oats. The Canadian Northern Railway (a predecessor of the Canadian National Railway) arrived in 1905, with Coniston lying along its transcontinental line. It was joined in 1908 by the Canadian Pacific Railway, which constructed a new direct line linking Sudbury and Toronto via Romford Junction. The population had risen to 20 families during this period and settlers requested the establishment of a local post office, which had to be named; the name Neelon was originally considered, but Dennis O'Brien, a local settler who became the first postmaster, decided on the name Coniston after it was suggested to him by T. Johnson, a railway construction superintendent who had been reading a novel set in the village of Coniston in the Lake District of England.

The Mond Nickel Company arrived in Coniston in 1913, relocating its smelter operations from the earlier settlement of Victoria Mines (located west of Sudbury), which swiftly became a ghost town. Coniston was chosen due to its more favourable rail connections and terrain. As part of the relocation, Mond purchased five family farms totalling 3,700 acres (1,500 ha), which "brought an end to the agricultural orientation of the community." Coniston was re-established as a Mond company town, with many existing company houses being relocated from Victoria Mines, along with the provision of a modern planned town with a street grid, sidewalks, and a water distribution system.

Coniston was subsequently incorporated under the provisions of the Municipal Act by Ontario Municipal Board Order A4741 on 1 January 1934, and remained such until the establishment of regional government. Prior to its annexation into Nickel Centre, the town's mayors were Edgar Taylor Austin (1934–46), Roy Snitch (1947–52), Walter Kilimnik (1953–57), William Evershed (1958-59), Maurice Beauchemin (1960–62) and Mike Solski (1963-72). Solski, the final mayor of Coniston as an independent town, won election to the mayoralty of the amalgamated town of Nickel Centre in 1972.

Notable residents of Coniston have included hockey players Neal Martin, Noel Price, Toe Blake, Jim Fox, Leo Lafrance, Andy Barbe and Randy Boyd as well as many other great hockey players. Coniston also includes the smaller neighbourhood of Austin, which may also be known as Old Coniston. This area borders Highway 17 and is home to a baseball field. The baseball field was abandoned and decommissioned prior to 2000 when Coniston became part of Greater Sudbury.

=== Falconbridge ===
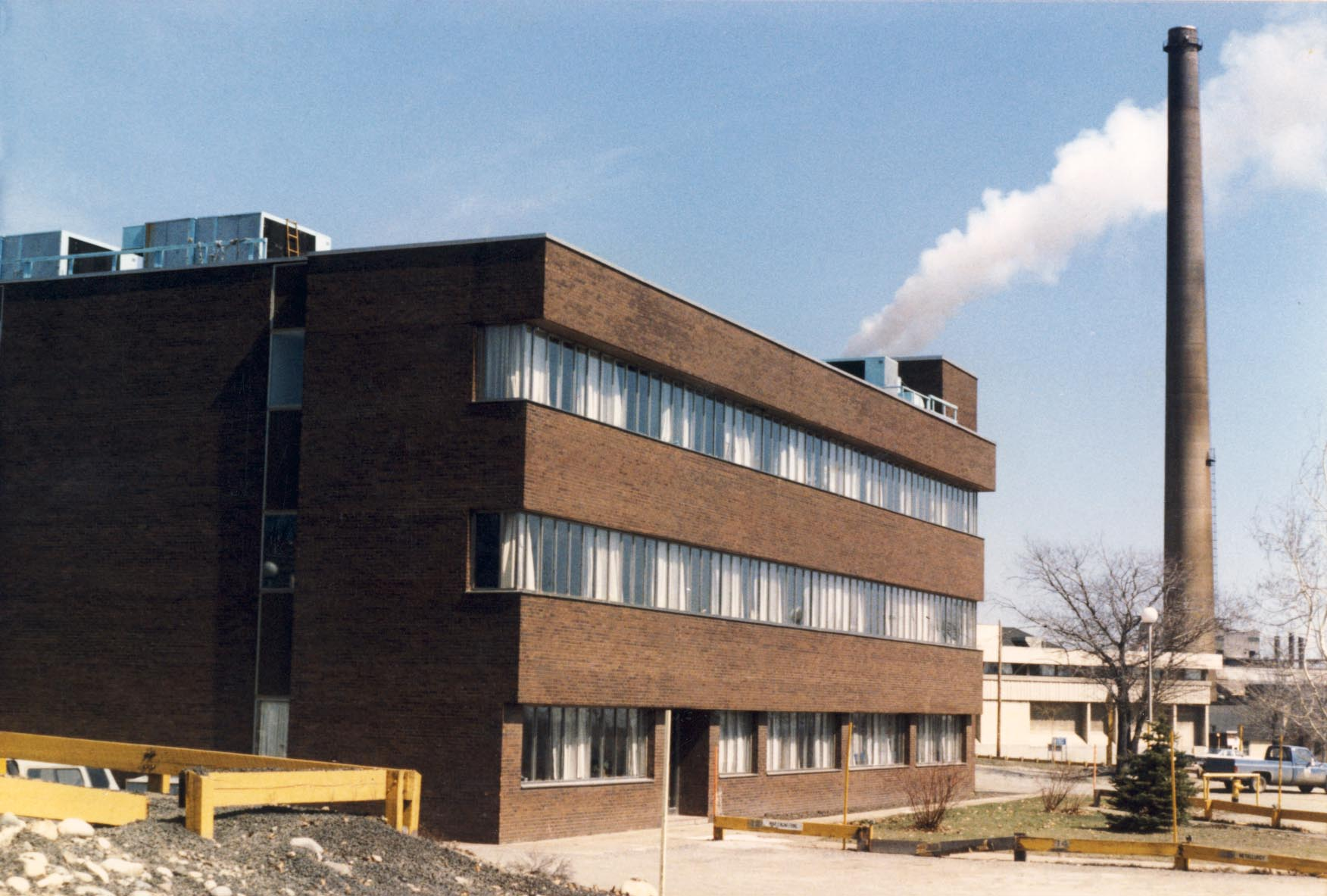
The Edison building, built by Falconbridge Ltd. in 1969, here photographed in 1985

The geographic township of Falconbridge was named in the 1880s for William Glenholm Falconbridge, a justice of the High Court of Ontario. The original settlement in the township was a small lumber camp.

A significant ore body was discovered in 1902 by Thomas Edison near what is now Falconbridge's Centennial Park. The Edison Ore-Milling Company was unsuccessful in establishing a mining operation, and abandoned his original claim in 1903. The claim reverted to Crown land until the Longyear Drilling Company bought it in 1911. Longyear subsequently merged with other small mining companies in the area to form the basis of what would ultimately become Falconbridge Ltd., although actual mining operations in the community did not begin until 1928, when Thayer Lindsley purchased the company for $2,500,000 and finally sunk the Falconbridge deposit's first mine shaft the following year.

Falconbridge Ltd. built the Edison Building in 1969 to serve as its head office. Falconbridge Ltd. was taken over by Swiss mining company Xstrata in 2006. In 2007, Xstrata donated the Edison Building to the city to serve as the new home of the municipal archives.

Falconbridge was incorporated as a town in 1957. The town's first and only reeve, John Franklin, served until the creation of Nickel Centre in 1973.

A visual and radar UFO incident occurred in the community on 11 November 1975, later reported in a press release by NORAD. The object was tracked on radar from CFS Falconbridge and sighted in binoculars, and estimated to be a 100-ft. diameter sphere with craters. Seven OPP police officers also witnessed the UFO. Some explanations given for the sightings included Venus, clouds, and/or weather balloons.

=== Garson ===
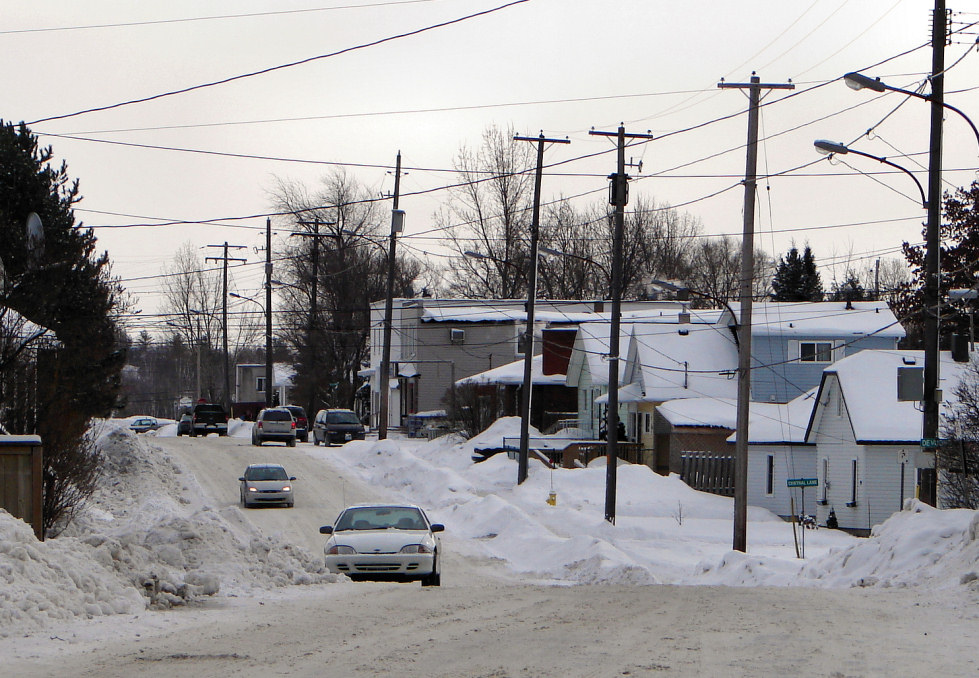
Birch Street, Garson

The community is named after the geographic township of Garson, named by the Ontario Government in the 1880s for William Garson, who represented Lincoln in the Legislative Assembly of Ontario from 1886 to 1890.

The area was first developed in 1888 as a logging camp, by the Holland and Emery Lumber Company of East Tawas, Michigan. In that year this firm constructed a narrow gauge logging railway from Wahnapitae, establishing its main operations at Headquarters Lake, near the Garson townsite. Logs from this area were taken to the Wanapitei River and driven to Lake Huron. Eventually this track was extended north into Capreol Township.

The Canadian Northern Railway was built through Garson in 1908.

Garson Mine, which is now owned by Vale Inco was first developed in 1911 by the Mond Nickel Company. The defunct Kirkwood Mine was also located in Garson.

=== Skead ===
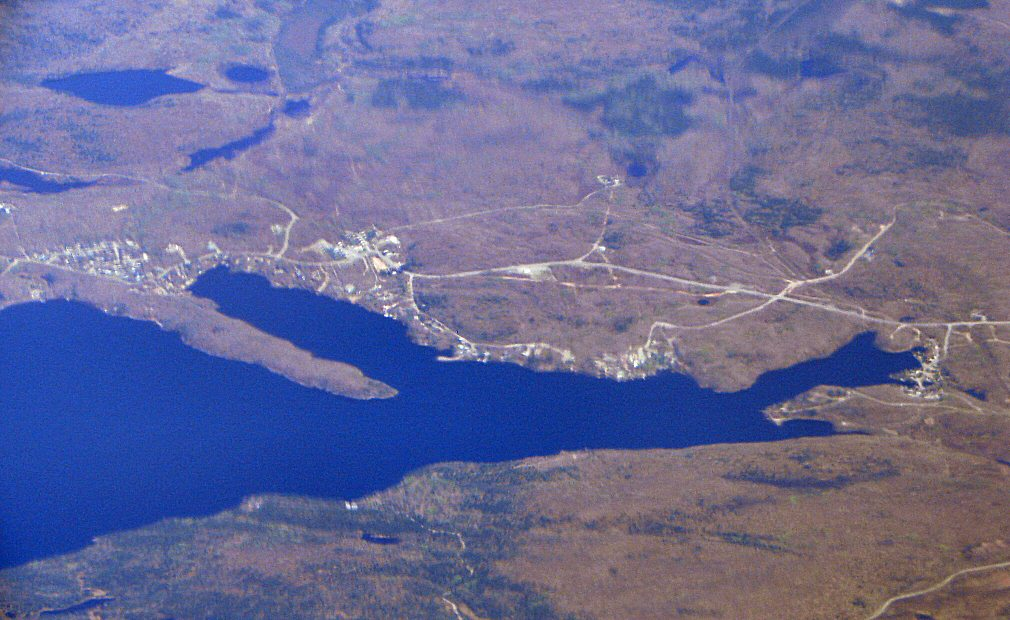
Aerial view of Skead (top) with Boland's Bay at right

Skead is located approximately 25 kilometres northeast of downtown Sudbury, and situated on south shore of Lake Wanapitei. Home to over 600 year round residents, Skead was settled about 1921 as a sawmill community, when the Spanish River Lumber Company relocated there from its original mill site, near the mouth of the Spanish River. It was named by the firm's general manager W. J. Bell, in honour of his late father-in-law, Canadian Senator James Skead. Skead was a stop on the Canadian Northern Railway line from Capreol to North Bay, which later became the Canadian National Railway Alderdale Subdivision, but rail service declined in the mid-20th century and was eliminated altogether in 1996.

==== Boland's Bay ====
Skead's address and telephone service also includes the smaller neighbourhood of Boland's Bay (46°39′11″N 80°45′59″W), a dispersed rural community and unincorporated place, on the eponymous bay at the southwestern tip of Lake Wanapitei. The community was known as Bowlands Bay and the bay as Bowland Bay until 1975 when the present spellings were adopted. However, the old spelling continues on the local street Bowlands Bay Road. Boland's Bay (spelled Bowlands Bay in older timetables) was a milepoint on the Canadian Northern Railway line from Capreol to North Bay, which later became the Canadian National Railway Alderdale Subdivision, but rail service declined in the mid-20th century and was eliminated altogether in 1996.

=== Wahnapitae ===
The community of Wahnapitae is located east of Sudbury along Highway 17. Established as a logging community, it was the first settlement in Nickel Centre. The community takes its name from the Wanapitei River, which flows through Wahnapitae, and whose name in turn comes from the Ojibwe word waanabidebiing, which means "concave-tooth [shaped] water" and describes the shape of Lake Wanapitei. The correct spelling of the community's name should not be confused with the correct spelling for the water bodies. During early stages of the town's development, the river was used by multiple companies to send harvest logs to Southern Ontario for processing. After mining became more viable in the Sudbury District, logging operations in Wahnapitae were stopped, leaving the town as a residential community.

== Ghost town ==
=== Happy Valley ===
The ghost town of Happy Valley, originally known as Spruce Valley, was first inhabited in 1906 by workers from the nearby mine at Garson. Not wanting to live in the company town, the workers built Happy Valley as their own. In 1930, the Garson Mine shut down, and the workers were transferred to the mines at Falconbridge.

Due to temperature inversions, the smelter at Falconbridge created severe pollution problems in Happy Valley, as heavy sulphur emissions from the smelter would become trapped in the valley. Workers suspected that they were being poisoned by pollution, which were confirmed in the 1960s and 1970s as society grew more environmentally-conscious. The community reached a multi-year deal with Falconbridge that the smelter would not operate on days when a north wind was blowing. After pressure was put on the Ontario government to do something about the poisoning via pollution, they began the process of abandoning Happy Valley in cooperation with the Regional Municipality of Sudbury and Falconbridge. It was the first occurrence where the provincial government financed the relocation of a community due to air pollution. Most Happy Valley residents accepted compensation to leave their homes and moved away by the mid-1970s, although at least one resident refused to leave and remained in the area until the late-1980s. The ghost town is currently off limits to the general public and protected by a barbed-wire fence.

== Transportation ==
The Greater Sudbury Airport, the city's main airport, is located in Nickel Centre approximately halfway between Falconbridge and Skead, although its official mailing address is in Garson.

Highway 17, the main route of the Trans-Canada Highway, passes through Coniston and Wahnapitae. Highway 17's freeway segment in the Walden area is slated to be expanded through Nickel Centre toward Markstay, along the existing Southwest and Southeast Bypass route and thence on a new alignment past Coniston and Wahnapitae.
