= Nipigon River =

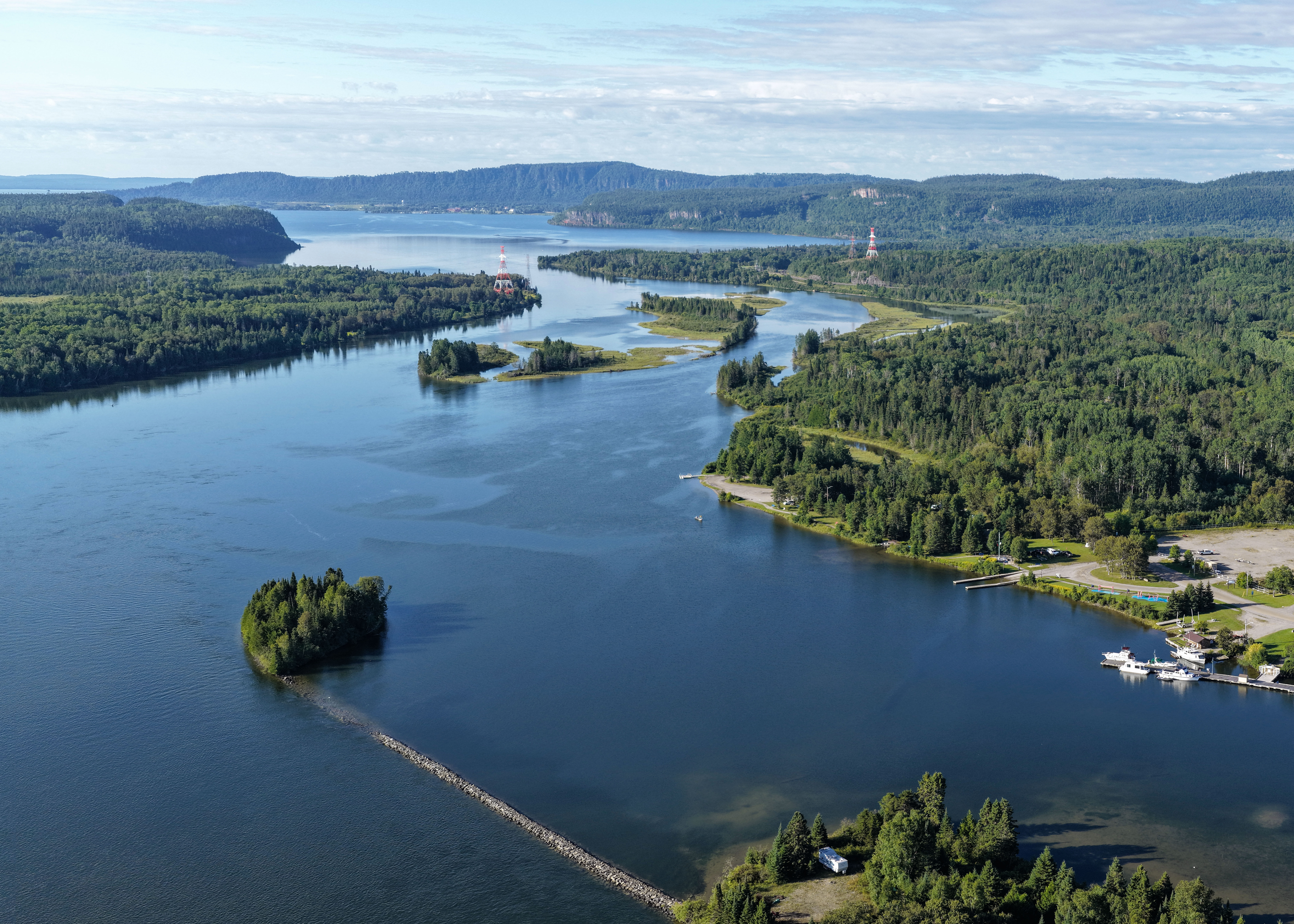
- Nipigon River viewed to the south, with Nipigon Bay in the distance

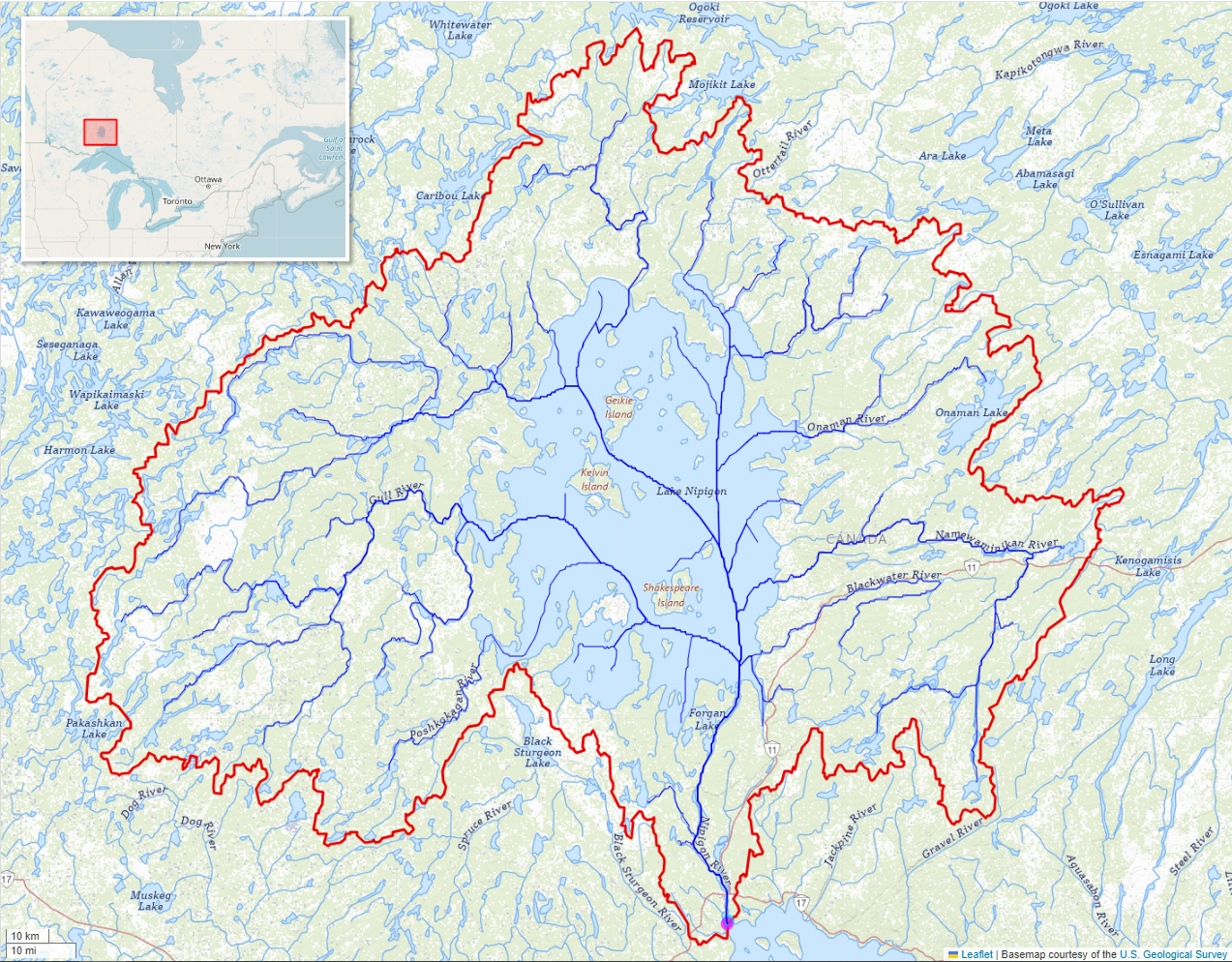
- Map of original Nipigon River basin, not including the diverted basin

- Location within Ontario

Location
- Country: Canada
- Province: Ontario
- District: Thunder Bay

Physical characteristics
- Source: Lake Nipigon
  - coordinates: 49°27′35″N 88°13′00″W
  - elevation: 259 m (850 ft)
- Mouth: Nipigon Bay
  - location: Red Rock
  - coordinates: 48°57′42″N 88°15′00″W
  - elevation: 184 m (604 ft)
- Length: 48 km (30 mi)
- Basin size: 25,400 km^{2} (9,800 sq mi)
- Discharge
  - location: Alexander Generating Station
  - average: 350 m^{3}/s (12,000 cu ft/s)

Basin features
- River system: Great Lakes Basin
- Waterbodies: Helen Lake
- Bridges: Nipigon River Bridge, CP Railway Bridge

The Nipigon River is located in Thunder Bay District in Northwestern Ontario, Canada. The river is about 48 km (30 mi) long (or 209 kilometres (130 mi) when measured to the head of Ombabika River) and 50 to 200 m (160 to 660 ft) wide, and flows from Lake Nipigon to Nipigon Bay on Lake Superior at the community of Red Rock, dropping from an elevation of 260 to 183 m (853 to 600 ft). It is the largest tributary of Lake Superior.

Since 1943, 14,360 square kilometres (5,545 mi^{2}) of the Ogoki River basin has been diverted to the headwaters of the Little Jackfish River, a tributary of Lake Nipigon. This diversion increases the size of the river's watershed by almost 60% to 39,760 square kilometres (15,350 sq mi), and contributes an average of about 116 cubic metres per second (4,100 cu ft/s) to the Nipigon River. This increased flow has caused significant erosion and landslides along the river.

== History ==
The Nipigon River was formerly known for the size and quantity of the brook trout that were to be found there. However, four dams built on the Nipigon led to a major decline in their population. The four dams are as follows:

- Cameron Falls Dam built in 1918
- Virgin Falls Dam built in 1925
- Alexander Dam built in 1930
- Pine Portage Dam built in 1950

== Modern uses ==
Three hydroelectric dams on the Nipigon, Cameron Falls Dam, Alexander Dam, and Pine Portage Dam (all operated by Ontario Power Generation), provided 2,144 gigawatt-hours in 2000. This however effectively makes travel via boat between Lake Nipigon and Lake Superior impossible. The river is also a popular fishing destination.

Hydroelectric generating stations on the Nipigon River
Installation (in downstream order)	Capacity	Head	No. of units	Year built
Pine Portage Generating Station	145 MW	32 m 105 ft	4	1950
Cameron Falls Generating Station	92 MW	22 m 72 ft	7	1920
Alexander Generating Station	69 MW	18 m 60 ft	5	1930

== Fishing ==
46 fish species have been identified in the Nipigon River, including the rare sturgeon, cisco, and “coaster” brook trout.

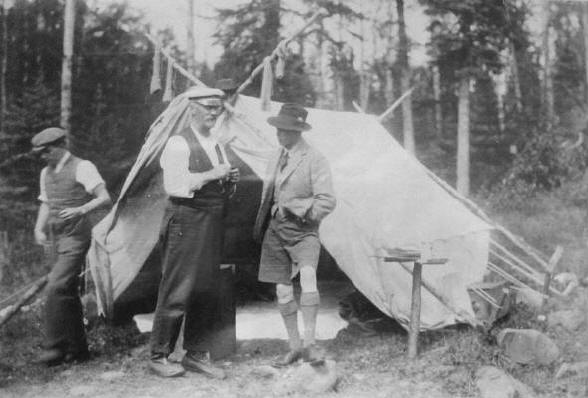
Prince Edward, Prince of Wales talks with river guide Neil McDougall at their camp on the Nipigon River, 1919.

In 1915, Dr Cook caught the world record for the largest brook trout, also known as speckled trout or coaster trout. Four years later, Prince Edward, Prince of Wales (later King Edward VIII and Duke of Windsor), spent time fishing on the Nipigon; a trout that he caught was mounted and today is displayed at the National Archives of Canada. The river also has a run of lake trout, rainbow trout and salmon during various times of the year. Fish that migrate up the river are able to get to the first dam which is located approximately 15 miles (24 km) from the mouth of the river system. The reservoir between the dams are good fishery, especially for large speckled trout and lake trout.

Fishing starts the first of May until freeze up at the end of November. The river can be accessed from boat, or fished by shore from various strategic locations.

== See also ==
- List of Ontario rivers
