= Agnew Lake =

Agnew Lake may refer to:

- Agnew Lake (California), United States
- Agnew Lake (Ontario), Canada
