= Agnew Lake (California) =

Lake in Mono County, California

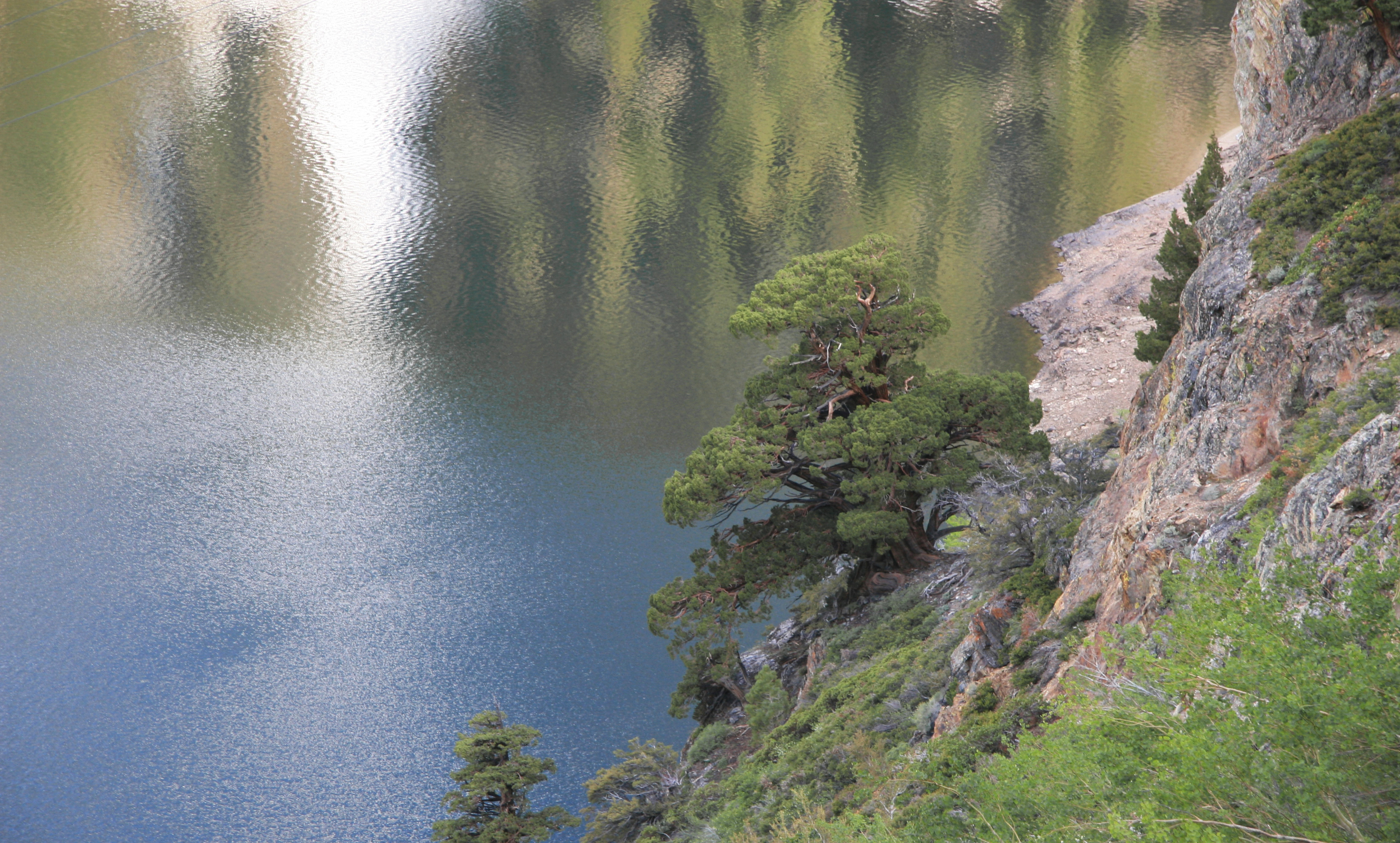
- Juniper tree along Agnew Lake

- Location within California Location within the United States
- Location: Mono County, California
- Coordinates: 37.755°N 119.135°W
- Type: Lake
- Etymology: Theodore C. Agnew, an early settler.
- Basin countries: United States
- Surface elevation: 8,501 feet (2,591 m)

Agnew Lake is a lake in Mono County, California, in the United States.

Agnew Lake was named for Theodore C. Agnew, an early settler.

== See also ==
- List of lakes in California
