= 1997 Nipissing District municipal elections =

- November 10, 1997

Elections were held in the organized municipalities in the Nipissing District of Ontario on November 10, 1997, in conjunction with municipal elections across the province.

This would mark the final elections for the municipalities of Sturgeon Falls, Cache Bay, Cardwell, Springer and Field, as they would all amalgamate into the Municipality of West Nipissing in 1998.

The following are the results of the reeve and mayoral races in each municipality and the council races in the City of North Bay.

== Airy ==
Ethel LaValley was the reeve of Airy Township in 1997. The Township amalgmated with four unorganized townships in 1998 to form the Municipality of South Algonquin, which elected its first council in June 1998.

== Bonfield ==
=== Reeve ===
The following were the results for reeve of Bonfield Township.

Reeve Candidate	Vote	%
Kean Beam (X)	469	49.68
Jules Gagne	297	31.46
Leo Duchesne	178	18.86

== Cache Bay ==
=== Mayor ===
The following were the results for mayor of Cache Bay.

Mayoral Candidate	Vote	%
Michael Gosson	Acclaimed	

== Cardwell ==
=== Reeve ===
The following were the results for reeve of Cardwell Township.

Reeve Candidate	Vote	%
Raymond Brouillette	Acclaimed	

== Calvin ==
=== Reeve ===
The following were the results for reeve of Calvin Township.

Reeve Candidate	Vote	%
Dave Carmichael (X)	166	59.93
John Houle	111	40.07

== Chisholm ==
=== Reeve ===
The following were the results for reeve of Chisholm Township.

Reeve Candidate	Vote	%
Doug Mackey	216	41.38
James Ismond (X)	187	35.82
Wanita Matthews	119	22.80

== East Ferris ==
=== Reeve ===
The following were the results for reeve of East Ferris Township.

Reeve Candidate	Vote	%
Claude Guillemette (X)	1,103	66.45
Bob Smith	557	33.55

== Field ==
=== Reeve ===
The following were the results for reeve of Field Township.

Reeve Candidate	Vote	%
Gerald Aubin (X)	216	46.65
Pierre Langevin	179	38.66
Germain Quenneville	68	14.69

== Mattawa ==
=== Mayor ===
The following were the results for mayor of Mattawa.

Mayoral Candidate	Vote	%
Collette Wilson	687	51.85
Tim Smith	638	48.15

== Mattawan ==
=== Reeve ===
The following were the results for reeve of Mattawan Township.

Reeve Candidate	Vote	%
Peter Murphy (X)	Acclaimed	

== North Bay ==
The following are the results for mayor and city council of North Bay.

Turnout was an historically low 25 per cent.

=== Mayor ===
Incumbent mayor Jack Burrows is re-elected to a second term by acclamation.

Mayoral Candidate	Vote	%
Jack Burrows (X)	Acclaimed	

=== North Bay City Council ===
10 to be elected

Candidate	Vote	%
Lynne Bennett (X)	7,536	8.45
Peter Handley (X)	6,407	7.19
Jack Smylie (X)	6,034	6.77
Jay Aspin (X)	5,770	6.47
George Maroosis (X)	5,719	6.41
Wayne Poeta (X)	5,358	6.01
Terry Talentino (X)	4,724	5.30
Maureen Boldt	4,428	4.97
Murray Shave	4,073	4.57
Sarah Campbell	3,901	4.38
Randy Lucenti	3,867	4.34
David Thompson	3,240	3.63
Tom Graham	3,099	3.48
Mike Gelinas	2,980	3.43
Trevor Knight	2,930	3.29
David Doyle	2,881	3.23
William Ferguson	2,776	3.11
Theo Margaritis	2,577	2.89
Glenn King	2,512	2.82
Brian Stevens	2,467	2.77
Bruce Cazabon	1,928	2.16
Durrell dePencier	1,912	2.14
Jayson Stewart	1,412	1.58
Jason Mousseau	624	0.70

== Papineau-Cameron ==
=== Reeve ===
The following were the results for reeve of Papineau-Cameron Township.

Reeve Candidate	Vote	%
Robert Corriveau (X)	Acclaimed	

== Springer ==
=== Reeve ===
The following were the results for reeve of Springer Township.

Reeve Candidate	Vote	%
Jean-Paul Charles (X)	Acclaimed	

== Sturgeon Falls ==
=== Mayor ===
The following were the results for mayor of Sturgeon Falls.

Mayor Candidate	Vote	%
Gary O'Connor	Acclaimed	

== Temagami ==
=== Mayor ===
The following were the results for mayor of Temagami.

Mayoral Candidate	Vote	%
Wayne Adair (X)	793	67.03
Ron Prefasi	198	16.74
Barb Fehrman	149	12.60
Drew Jacques	43	3.63

== West Nipissing (1998) ==
Following the amalgamation of West Nipissing, voters in the new municipality elected a new mayor and council on December 3, 1998. The following were the results for mayor:

Mayoral Candidate	Vote	%
Gary O'Connor	4,025	55.84
Raymond Brouillette	3,052	42.34
Michel Ethier	131	1.82
