= 2026 Nipissing District municipal elections =

Ontario elections

Elections were held in the organized municipalities in the Nipissing District of Ontario on October 26, 2026 in conjunction with municipal elections across the province.

The following are the results of the mayoral races in each municipality and the council races in the City of North Bay.

== Bonfield ==
=== Mayor ===
List of candidates:

| Mayoral Candidate | Vote | % |
|---|---|---|
| Jason Corbett | | |
| Sarah Dickhout | | |
| Marcin Krolikowski | | |
| Randy McLaren | | |
| Jules Gagne | | |

== Calvin ==
=== Mayor ===
| Mayoral Candidate | Vote | % |
|---|---|---|
| Richard Gould (X) | | |
| Danielle Albright | | |

== Chisholm ==
=== Mayor ===
List of candidates:

| Mayoral Candidate | Vote | % |
|---|---|---|
| Gail Degagne (X) | | |
| Paul Sharp | | |

== East Ferris ==
=== Mayor ===
Mayor Rick Champagne is being challenged by councillor and Conservative 2021 federal election candidate in Nipissing—Timiskaming, Steven Trahan.

List of candidates:

| Mayoral Candidate | Vote | % |
|---|---|---|
| Rick Champagne (X) | | |
| Steven Trahan | | |

== Mattawa ==
=== Mayor ===
List of candidates:

| Mayoral Candidate | Vote | % |
|---|---|---|
| Raymond A. Belanger (X) | | |
| Joe Miller | | |
| Loren Mick | | |
| Michelle Lahaye | | |
| Sylvain Bellehumeur | | |

== Mattawan ==
=== Mayor ===
| Mayoral Candidate | Vote | % |
|---|---|---|
| Peter Murphy (X) | Acclaimed | |

== North Bay ==
List of candidates:

=== Mayor ===
Mayor Peter Chirico announced he was not running for re-election. Running for mayor included inventory auditor Connor Currie, businessman Dan Seguin, educator Melanie Demers, deputy mayor Maggie Horsfield, and city councillor Jamie Lowery.

| Mayoral Candidate | Vote | % |
|---|---|---|
| Maggie Horsfield | 9,277 | 52.05 |
| Jamie Lowery | 6,496 | 36.45 |
| Connor Currie | 1,241 | 6.96 |
| Melanie Demers | 488 | 2.74 |
| Daniel Seguin | 322 | 1.81 |

=== North Bay City Council ===
10 to be elected

| Candidate | Vote | % |
|---|---|---|
| Johanne Brousseau | 8,848 | 8.16 |
| Dave Dale | 8,603 | 7.93 |
| Tanya Vrebosch (X) | 7,154 | 6.60 |
| Caroline Corbett | 6,128 | 5.65 |
| Justine Mallah (X) | 5,897 | 5.44 |
| Mark King (X) | 5,850 | 5.39 |
| Chris Mayne (X) | 5,686 | 5.24 |
| Sara Inch (X) | 5,260 | 4.85 |
| Jordaan Allison | 5,200 | 4.80 |
| Terry Parolin | 4,912 | 4.53 |
| Lana Mitchell (X) | 4,513 | 4.16 |
| Dave Mendicino | 4,505 | 4.15 |
| Nathaniel Lachance | 3,657 | 3.37 |
| Bill Vrebosch | 3,606 | 3.33 |
| Rahul Dass | 3,503 | 3.23 |
| Johanna Kristolaitis | 3,439 | 3.17 |
| TJ Finch | 3,348 | 3.09 |
| Glen Langlois | 3,284 | 3.03 |
| Darryl Skinner | 3,138 | 2.89 |
| Randall Tilander | 2,892 | 2.67 |
| Eric Morgan | 2,438 | 2.25 |
| Louise Poitras | 1,995 | 1.84 |
| Mike Taylor | 1,802 | 1.66 |
| Myles Henberry | 1,729 | 1.59 |
| Matthew Lachowski | 1,048 | 0.97 |

== Papineau-Cameron ==
=== Mayor ===
List of candidates:

| Mayoral Candidate | Vote | % |
|---|---|---|
| Robert Corriveau (X) | | |
| Shelley Belanger | | |

== South Algonquin ==
=== Mayor ===
List of candidates:

| Mayoral Candidate | Vote | % |
|---|---|---|
| Ethel LaValley (X) | | |
| Baker Bernard | | |

== Temagami ==
=== Mayor ===
List of candidates:

| Mayoral Candidate | Vote | % |
|---|---|---|
| Krzysztof Kris Betkowski | | |
| Gordon McCart | | |

== West Nipissing ==
=== Mayor ===
List of candidates:

| Mayoral Candidate | Vote | % |
|---|---|---|
| Kathleen Rochon (X) | | |
| Charles Gaston Desgroseilliers | | |
| Yvon Duhaime | | |
