= 2006 Nipissing District municipal elections =

- November 13, 2006

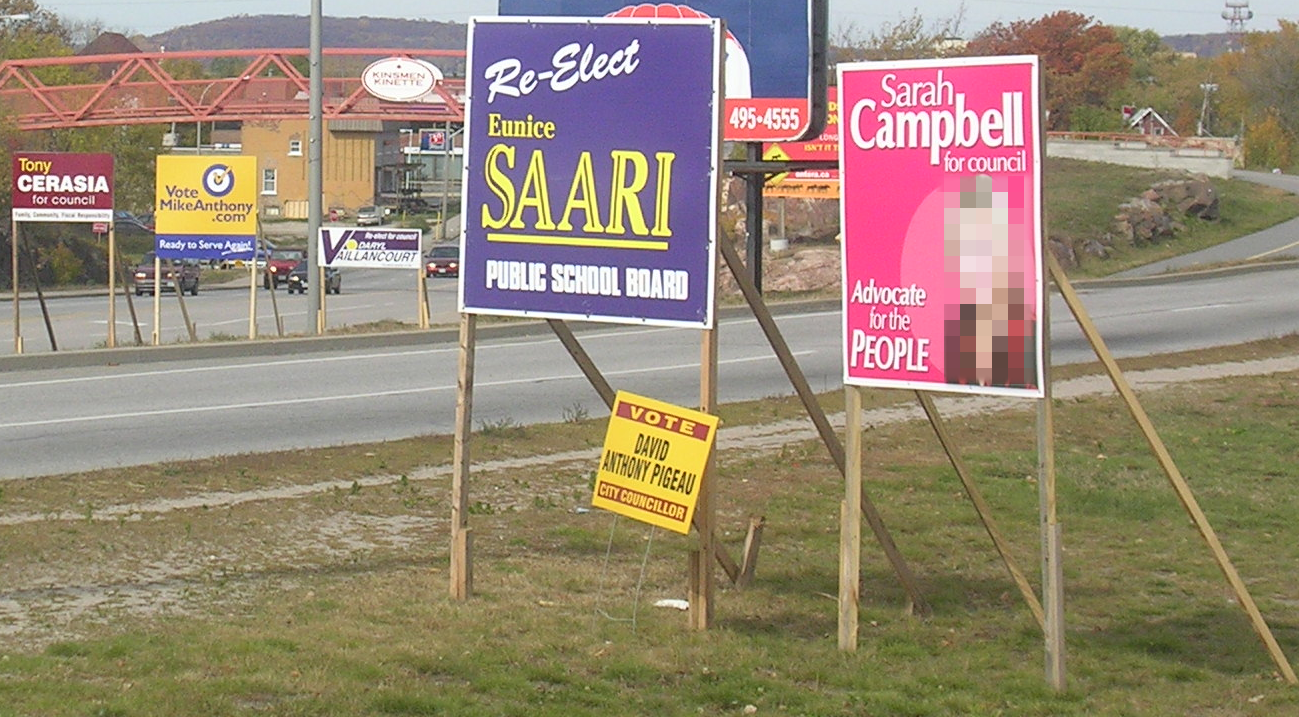
Municipal election signs in North Bay, Ontario.

Elections were held in the organized municipalities in the Nipissing District of Ontario on November 13, 2006 in conjunction with municipal elections across the province.

The following are the results of the mayoral races in each municipality and the council races in the City of North Bay.

== Bonfield ==
=== Mayor ===
The following were the results for mayor of Bonfield.

Mayoral Candidate	Vote	%
Narry McCarthy (X)	665	~70%
Robert Boisvert		

== Calvin ==
=== Mayor ===
The following were the results for mayor of Calvin.

Mayoral Candidate	Vote	%
Dave Carmichael (X)	122	46.21
Rocky Edmonds	104	39.39
Roger Rose	38	14.39

== Chisholm ==
=== Mayor ===
The following were the results for mayor of Chisholm.

Mayoral Candidate	Vote	%
Barbara Groves (X)	229	55.45
Lise Gagnon	184	44.55

== East Ferris ==
=== Mayor ===
The following were the results for mayor of East Ferris.

Mayoral Candidate	Vote	%
Bill Vrebosch (X)	1,359	73.14
Donald Champagne	499	26.86

== Mattawa ==
=== Mayor ===
The following were the results for mayor of Mattawa.

Mayoral Candidate	Vote	%
Dean Backer (X)	Acclaimed	

== Mattawan ==
Peter Murphy is re-elected as mayor.

== North Bay ==
The following are the results for mayor and city council of North Bay.

=== Mayor ===
Incumbent mayor Vic Fedeli defeated former mayor Stan Lawlor in a landslide. The turnout was about 45%.

Mayoral Candidate	Vote	%
Vic Fedeli (X)	12,168	67.23
Stan Lawlor	5,931	32.77

=== North Bay City Council ===
10 to be elected

Candidate	Vote	%
Peter Chirico (X)	10,087	9.03
Mike Anthony (X)	9,276	8.30
Judy Koziol (X)	8,706	7.79
Sarah Campbell (X)	8,048	7.21
Maureen Boldt (X)	7,878	7.05
Dave Mendicino (X)	7,741	6.93
Mac Bain (X)	7,674	6.87
Chris Mayne	7,502	6.72
Daryl Vaillancourt (X)	7,039	6.30
Tom Graham (X)	6,418	5.75
Tanya Vrebosch	6,041	5.41
Tom Tucker	5,976	5.35
John Wilson	4,781	4.28
Tony Cerasia	4,490	4.02
Clinton Vuorimaki	3,918	3.51
David A. Pigeau	3,104	2.78
Kimberley A. Gray	3,021	2.70

== Papineau-Cameron ==
=== Mayor ===
The following were the results for mayor of Papineau-Cameron.

Mayoral Candidate	Vote	%
Robert Corriveau (X)	Acclaimed	

== South Algonquin ==
=== Mayor ===
Percy Bresnahan was elected mayor.

== Temagami ==
=== Mayor ===
The following were the results for mayor of Temagami.

Mayoral Candidate	Vote	%
Ike Laba	499	43.62
George Leger	319	27.88
Debby Burrows	297	25.96
John Guppy	29	2.53

== West Nipissing ==
=== Mayor ===
The following were the results for mayor of West Nipissing.

Mayoral Candidate	Vote	%
Joanne Savage (X)	4,333	67.70
Claude Arcand	1,876	29.31
Michel Ethier	137	2.98
