= 2000 Nipissing District municipal elections =

- November 13, 2000

Elections were held in the organized municipalities in the Nipissing District of Ontario on November 13, 2000, in conjunction with municipal elections across the province.

The following are the results of the reeve and mayoral races in each municipality and the council races in the City of North Bay.

== Bonfield ==
=== Reeve ===
The following were the results for reeve of Bonfield.

Reeve Candidate	Vote	%
Narry McCarthy	537	54.57
Ken Beam (X)	358	36.38
Jules Gagne	89	9.04

== Calvin ==
=== Reeve ===
The following were the results for reeve of Calvin.

Reeve Candidate	Vote	%
Dave Carmichael (X)	Green checkmark	
John Houle		

== Chisholm ==
=== Reeve ===
The following were the results for reeve of Chisholm.

Reeve Candidate	Vote	%
Wanita Matthews	Acclaimed	

== East Ferris ==
=== Reeve ===
The following were the results for reeve of East Ferris.

Reeve Candidate	Vote	%
Bill Vrebosch	Acclaimed	

== Mattawa ==
=== Mayor ===
The following were the results for mayor of Mattawa.

Mayoral Candidate	Vote	%
Dean Backer	828	66.29
Carol Jeske	421	33.71

== Mattawan ==
=== Reeve ===
The following were the results for reeve of Mattawan.

Reeve Candidate	Vote	%
Peter Murphy (X)	Acclaimed	

== North Bay ==
The following are the results for mayor and city council of North Bay.

=== Mayor ===
Incumbent mayor Jack Burrows was re-elected to a third term of office in a landslide, despite attacks from the North Bay Citizens' Taxpayers Association which citicized his administration's spending and taxes. His main opponent was businessman Tom Graham.

Mayoral Candidate	Vote	%
Jack Burrows (X)	10,431	58.76
Tom Graham	3,923	22.10
Brian Stevens	3,398	19.14

=== North Bay City Council ===
10 to be elected

Candidate	Vote	%
Al McDonald	9,607	8.08
Lynne Bennett (X)	8,198	6.89
Susan Church	7,559	6.35
Peter Handley (X)	6,215	5.22
Laurie Kidd	6,181	5.20
George Maroosis (X)	6,070	5.10
Mike Anthony	5,967	5.02
Peter Chirico	5,939	4.99
Sarah Campbell (X)	5,915	4.97
Maureen Boldt (X)	5,282	4.44
Jay Aspin (X)	4,947	4.16
David Thompson	4,933	4.15
Mac Bain	4,613	3.88
Wayne Poeta (X)	4,333	3.64
Kathy Hewitt	3,831	3.22
Trevor Knight	3,827	3.22
Frank O'Hagan	3,651	3.07
Murray Shave (X)	3,242	2.73
Debbie Graham	3,222	2.71
Steve Brown	2,810	2.36
Mickey Beattie	2,715	2.28
Roger Edward Guillemette	2,701	2.27
Jayson Stewart	2,608	2.19
Harley Renaud	2,384	2.00
Viola Bailey	2,214	1.86

== Papineau-Cameron ==
=== Reeve ===
Bob Corriveau was re-elected as reeve.

== South Algonquin ==
=== Mayor ===
Jim Etmanski is elected mayor.

== Temagami ==
=== Mayor ===
The following were the results for mayor of Temagami.

Mayoral Candidate	Vote	%
Wayne Adair (X)	Acclaimed	

== West Nipissing ==
=== Mayor ===
The following were the results for mayor of West Nipissing.

Mayoral Candidate	Vote	%
Gary O'Connor (X)	Acclaimed	
