= 2022 Nipissing District municipal elections =

Elections were held in the organized municipalities in the Nipissing District of Ontario on October 24, 2022 in conjunction with municipal elections across the province.

The following are the results of the mayoral races in each municipality and the council races in the City of North Bay.

== Bonfield ==
=== Mayor ===
The following were the results for mayor of Bonfield.

Mayoral Candidate	Vote	%
Narry Paquette	576	58.42
Jules Gagne	266	26.98
Randall McLaren (X)	144	14.60

== Calvin ==
=== Mayor ===
The following were the results for mayor of Calvin.

Mayoral Candidate	Vote	%
Richard Gould	292	82.25
Ian Pennell (X)	63	17.75

== Chisholm ==
=== Mayor ===
Gail Degagne was re-elected as mayor of Chisholm by acclamation.

Mayoral Candidate	Vote	%
Gail Degagne (X)	Acclaimed	

== East Ferris ==
=== Mayor ===
Mayor Pauline Rochefort was re-elected by acclamation.

Mayoral Candidate	Vote	%
Pauline Rochefort (X)	Acclaimed	

== Mattawa ==
=== Mayor ===
The following were the results for mayor of Mattawa.

Mayoral Candidate	Vote	%
Raymond A. Belanger	554	78.81
Marie Johanne Goyette	149	21.19

== Mattawan ==
Peter Murphy was re-elected as mayor of Mattawan by acclamation.

=== Mayor ===
Mayoral Candidate	Vote	%
Peter Murphy (X)	Acclaimed	

== North Bay ==
The following are the results for mayor and city council of North Bay.

=== Mayor ===
North Bay mayor Al McDonald announced he was not running for re-election. Running to replace him were former city councillor and president of the North Bay Chamber of Commerce Peter Chirico, city councillor Johanne Brousseau and public service worker Leslie McVeety.

Mayoral Candidate	Vote	%
Peter Chirico	7,579	48.72
Johanne Brousseau	6,855	44.07
Leslie McVeety	1,121	7.21

LGBTQ activist Jason Maclennan was also an early mayoral candidate, including several campaign appearances in drag as Geri Atrick. but withdrew from the race in advance of the registration deadline and thus did not appear on the ballot. His campaign was later adapted into the Bell Fibe TV1 short-form comedy series Geri Atrick 4 Mayor, starring Kitten Kaboodle as Geri Atrick.

=== North Bay City Council ===
10 to be elected

Candidate	Vote	%
Maggie Horsfield	6,324	6.26
Lana Mitchell	6,251	6.19
Justine Mallah	5,863	5.80
Chris Mayne (X)	5,792	5.73
Mark King (X)	5,789	5.73
Sara Inch	5,462	5.41
Tanya Vrebosch (X)	4,880	4.83
Jamie Lowery	4,815	4.77
Gary Gardiner	4,553	4.51
Mac Bain (X)	4,529	4.48
Scott Kile	4,176	4.13
Derek Shogren	4,113	4.07
Dave Mendicino (X)	3,923	3.88
Ed Valenti (X)	3,832	3.79
Peter Gregory	3,670	3.63
Ralph Celentano	3,615	3.58
Bill Vrebosch (X)	3,288	3.25
Terry Parolin	3,011	2.98
Francine Boulay	2,440	2.41
Darryl Skinner	2,439	2.41
Eric Morgan	1,961	1.94
Sheldon Forgette	1,924	1.90
Michael Taylor	1,803	1.78
Randall Tilander	1,552	1.54
Lance Darnell	1,490	1.47
David Poliquin	1,280	1.27
Richard Cadotte	842	0.83
Deric Reichstein	801	0.79
Levi Besserer	629	0.62

== Papineau-Cameron ==
=== Mayor ===
Robert Corriveau was re-elected as mayor of Papineau-Cameron by acclamation.

Mayoral Candidate	Vote	%
Robert Corriveau (X)	Acclaimed	

== South Algonquin ==
=== Mayor ===
The following were the results mayor of South Algonquin.

Mayoral Candidate	Vote	%
Ethel LaValley	645	67.75
Bongo	201	21.11
Barney Baker	106	11.13

== Temagami ==
=== Mayor ===
Dan O'Mara was re-elected for mayor of Temagami by acclamation.

Mayoral Candidate	Vote	%
Dan O'Mara (X)	Acclaimed	

== West Nipissing ==
=== Mayor ===
The following were the results for mayor of West Nipissing.

Mayoral Candidate	Vote	%
Kathleen Thorne Rochon	2,698	40.98
Dave Lewington	1,978	30.04
Dan Roveda	1,908	28.98
