= 2003 Nipissing District municipal elections =

- November 10, 2003

Elections were held in the organized municipalities in the Nipissing District of Ontario on November 10, 2003 in conjunction with municipal elections across the province.

The following are the results of the mayoral races in each municipality and the council races in the City of North Bay.

== Bonfield ==
=== Mayor ===
The following were the results for mayor of Bonfield.

Mayoral Candidate	Vote	%
Narry McCarthy (X)	Acclaimed	

== Calvin ==
=== Mayor ===
The following were the results for mayor of Calvin.

Mayoral Candidate	Vote	%
Dave Carmichael (X)	Acclaimed	

== Chisholm ==
=== Mayor ===
The following were the results for mayor of Chisholm.

Mayoral Candidate	Vote	%
Barb Groves (X)	Acclaimed	

== East Ferris ==
=== Mayor ===
The following were the results for mayor of East Ferris.

Mayoral Candidate	Vote	%
Bill Vrebosch (X)	Acclaimed	

== Mattawa ==
=== Mayor ===
The following were the results for mayor of Mattawa.

Mayoral Candidate	Vote	%
Dean Backer (X)	Acclaimed	

== Mattawan ==
Peter Murphy is re-elected as mayor of Mattawan.

== North Bay ==
The following are the results for mayor and city council of North Bay.

=== Mayor ===
Businessman Vic Fedeli defeated city councillor Lynne Bennett in a landslide. Fedeli ran on a plan called "2020 Vision", a 12-page document he sent to every household and business in the city.

Mayoral Candidate	Vote	%
Vic Fedeli	13,025	75.00
Lynne Bennett	3,147	18.12
Tim Wright	686	3.95
Jeff Marceau	508	2.93

=== North Bay City Council ===
10 to be elected

Candidate	Vote	%
Peter Chirico (X)	9,201	8.82
Dave Mendicino	7,091	6.80
Tom Mason	6,738	6.46
Judy Koziol	6,484	6.21
Maureen Boldt (X)	6,349	6.08
Mike Anthony (X)	6,267	6.01
Mac Bain	5,908	5.66
Daryl Vaillancourt	5,651	5.42
George Maroosis (X)	5,551	5.32
Sarah Campbell (X)	5,527	5.30
Tom Graham	4,301	4.12
Tom Tucker	4,252	4.08
Bob Bainbridge	3,851	3.69
Clinton Vuorimaki	3,575	3.43
Sean Madigan	3,307	3.17
David Thompson	2,929	2.81
Trevor Jones	2,776	2.66
Linda Hearst	2,744	2.63
Judie Pageau	2,724	2.61
Don Size	2,388	2.29
Tammy Tipler-Priolo	1,873	1.80
David Briggs	1,825	1.75
Art Campbell	1,470	1.41
Timothy Goldthorp	1,091	1.05
Hendrik Pape	466	0.45

== Papineau-Cameron ==
=== Mayor ===
The following were the results for mayor of Papineau-Cameron.

Mayoral Candidate	Vote	%
Robert Corriveau (X)	Acclaimed	

== South Algonquin ==
=== Mayor ===
Jim Etmanski is re-elected mayor.

== Temagami ==
=== Mayor ===
The following were the results for mayor of Temagami.

Mayoral Candidate	Vote	%
Wayne Adair (X)	737	71.97
Drew Jacques	287	28.03

== West Nipissing ==
=== Mayor ===
The following were the results for mayor of West Nipissing.

Mayoral Candidate	Vote	%
Joanne Savage	3,346	40.34
Wayne LeBelle	3,057	36.85
Marlene Bertrand	1,434	17.29
Marcel Prieur	395	4.76
Michel Ethier	63	0.76
