= 2014 Nipissing District municipal elections =

Elections were held in the organized municipalities in the Nipissing District of Ontario on October 27, 2014, in conjunction with municipal elections across the province.

== Bonfield ==
Mayoral Candidate	Vote	%
Randy McLaren (X)	459	41.96
Bob Dugard	302	27.61
Jules Gagne	241	22.03
Rita Hamilton	87	7.95

== Calvin ==
Mayoral Candidate	Vote	%
Wayne Brown (X)	195	67.01
Danielle Albright	96	32.99

== Chisholm ==
Mayoral Candidate	Vote	%
Leo Jobin (X)	299	61.52
Ashley Muttart	187	38.48

== East Ferris ==
Mayoral Candidate	Vote	%
Bill Vrebosch (X)	Acclaimed	

== Mattawa ==
Mayoral Candidate	Vote	%
Dean Backer (X)	Acclaimed	

== Mattawan ==
Mayoral Candidate	Vote	%
Peter Murphy (X)	Acclaimed	

== North Bay ==
Mayoral Candidate	Vote	%
Al McDonald (X)	12,636	84.24
Greg A. Gray	991	6.61
Daniel Seguin	926	6.17
Harvey C. Villneff	447	2.98

== Papineau-Cameron ==
Mayoral Candidate	Vote	%
Robert Corriveau (X)	Acclaimed	

== South Algonquin ==
Mayoral Candidate	Vote	%
Jane Dumas (X)	Acclaimed	

== Temagami ==
Mayoral Candidate	Vote	%
Lorie Hunter (X)	692	68.04
Doug Adams	325	31.96

== West Nipissing ==
Mayoral Candidate	Vote	%
Joane Savage (X)	Acclaimed	
