= 2018 Nipissing District municipal elections =

Elections were held in the organized municipalities in the Nipissing District of Ontario on October 22, 2018 in conjunction with municipal elections across the province.

== Bonfield ==
=== Mayor ===
Mayoral Candidate	Vote	%
Randall McLaren (X)	408	55.36
Jules Gagne	329	44.64

== Calvin ==
=== Mayor ===
Mayoral Candidate	Vote	%
Ian Pennell (X)	163	63.92
Danielle Albright	92	36.08

== Chisholm ==
=== Mayor ===
Mayoral Candidate	Vote	%
Leo Jobin (X)	Acclaimed	

== East Ferris ==
=== Mayor ===
Mayoral Candidate	Vote	%
Pauline Rochefort	Acclaimed	

== Mattawa ==
=== Mayor ===
Mayoral Candidate	Vote	%
Dean Backer (X)	Acclaimed	

== Mattawan ==
=== Mayor ===
Mayoral Candidate	Vote	%
Peter Murphy (X)	Acclaimed	

== North Bay ==
=== Mayor ===
Mayoral Candidate	Vote	%
Al McDonald (X)	8,079	48.60
Gary Philip Gardiner	6,715	40.40
Sheldon Forgette	1,532	9.22
Mike Guillemette	199	1.20
Will Boisson	98	0.59

=== North Bay City Council ===
10 to be elected

Candidate	Vote	%
Tanya Vrebosch (X)	7,297	6.68
Johanne Brousseau	7,025	6.43
Mike Anthony (X)	6,251	5.72
Chris Mayne (X)	6,249	5.72
Bill Vrebosch	6,008	5.50
Mark King (X)	5,888	5.39
Scott Robertson	5,212	4.77
Mac Bain (X)	4,986	4.57
Dave Mendicino	4,801	4.40
Marcus Tignanelli	4,630	4.24
George Maroosis (X)	4,489	4.11
Ed Valenti	4,417	4.04
Derek Shogren (X)	4,290	3.93
Jeff J. Serran (X)	4,260	3.90
Sylvie Hotte	4,092	3.75
Neal McNamara	4,039	3.70
Peter Gregory	4,038	3.70
Don Rennick	3,325	3.04
David Thompson	3,322	3.04
Miles Peters	3,130	2.87
Arlene Phillips	3,069	2.81
Rene Giroux	3,066	2.81
Cindy Ciancio	2,730	2.50
Alz Lauziere	1,245	1.14
Richard Cadotte	818	0.75
Harvey Villneff	541	0.50

== Papineau-Cameron ==
=== Mayor ===
Mayoral Candidate	Vote	%
Robert Corriveau (X)	305	62.76
Sandra Morin	181	37.24

== South Algonquin ==
=== Mayor ===
Mayoral Candidate	Vote	%
Jane Dumas (X)	Acclaimed	

== Temagami ==
=== Mayor ===
Mayoral Candidate	Vote	%
Dan O'Mara	623	49.41
Biff Lowery	379	30.06
Doug Adams	223	17.68
Daniel Lacroix-Belanger	36	2.85

== West Nipissing ==
=== Mayor ===
Mayoral Candidate	Vote	%
Joanne Savage (X)	2,771	40.00
Ronald Demers	2,212	31.93
Donald Leblanc	1,601	23.11
Russ Dunne	344	4.97
