= Lake Nosbonsing =

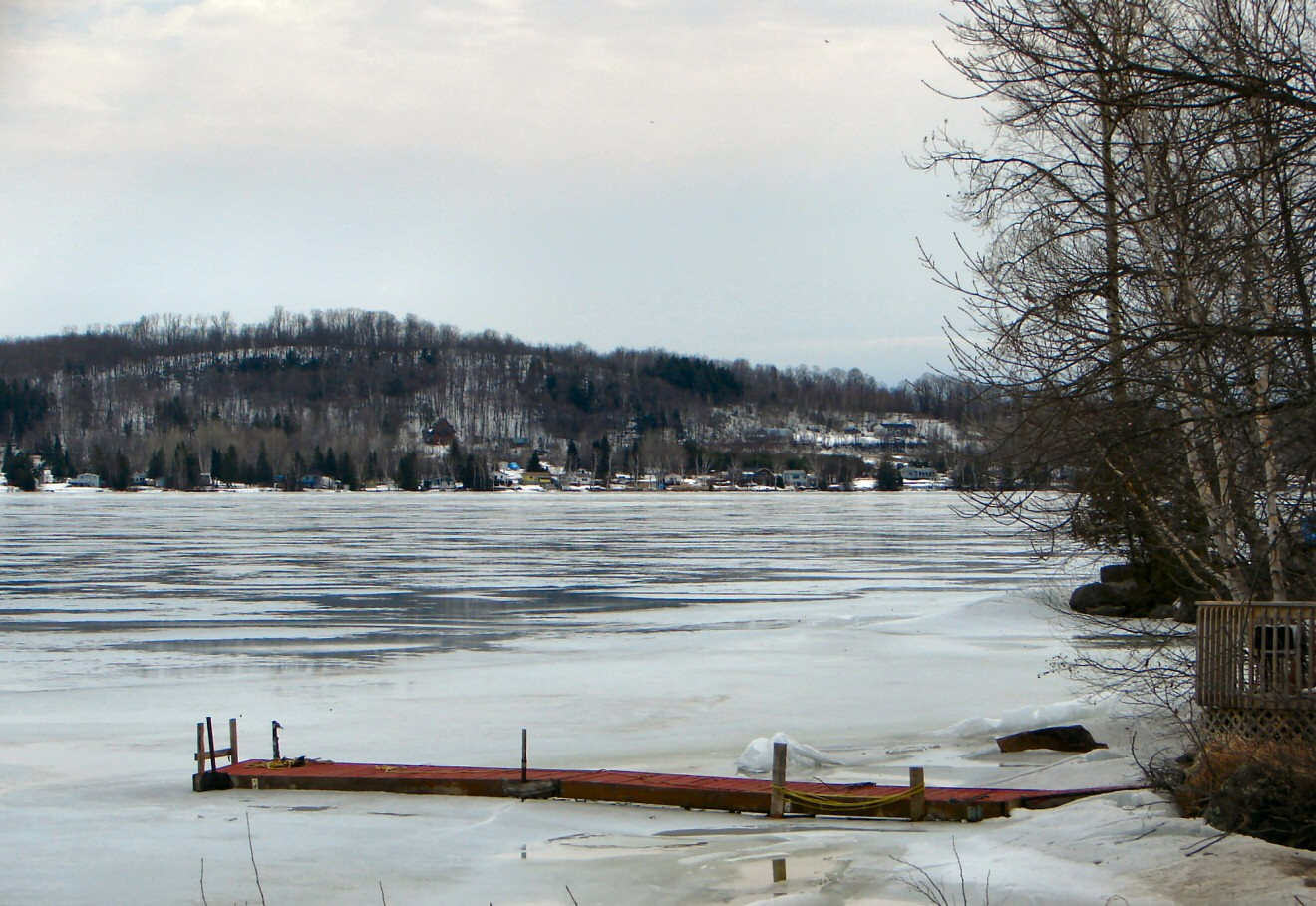
- Astorville at the western end of the lake

- Location in Ontario
- Location: Nipissing District, Ontario
- Coordinates: 46°12′09″N 79°12′31″W
- Type: Lake
- Part of: Saint Lawrence River drainage basin
- Primary inflows: Depot Creek
- Primary outflows: Kaibuskong River
- Basin countries: Canada
- Max. length: 11 kilometres (6.8 mi)
- Max. width: 5 kilometres (3.1 mi)
- Surface elevation: 237 metres (778 ft)
- Islands: Perron Island
- Settlements: Astorville, Bonfield, Nosbonsing

Lake Nosbonsing (French: Lac Nosbonsing) is a lake in the municipalities of Bonfield, Chisholm, and East Ferris in Nipissing District in Northeastern Ontario, Canada. It is near the City of North Bay, is the source of the Kaibuskong River, and is in the Saint Lawrence River drainage basin.

The primary inflow, at the south, is Depot Creek. The primary outflow, at the northeast, is the Kaibuskong River, which flows via the Mattawa River and the Ottawa River to the Saint Lawrence River.

The middle and west of the lake are in East Ferris; the east of the lake is in Bonfield; and a small portion of the very south centre of the lake is in Chisholm. There are three named communities on the lake: Astorville, at the western tip, and Nosbonsing at the north, both in East Ferris; and Bonfield, at the northeast at the outflow of the Kaibuskong River, in Bonfield. The original Canadian Pacific Railway transcontinental main line runs along the northeast shore from the communities of Bonfield to Nosbonsing. There is one named island, Perron Island, in the west part of the lake; and two named points: Shields Point and McConnell Point, both on the north shore.

== See also ==
- List of lakes in Ontario
