= Kaibuskong River =

- Location of the mouth of the Kaibuskong River in Ontario

Location
- Country: Canada
- Province: Ontario
- Region: Northeastern Ontario
- District: Nipissing
- Municipality: Bonfield

Physical characteristics
- Source: Lake Nosbonsing
  - coordinates: 46°13′55″N 79°08′56″W
  - elevation: 236 m (774 ft)
- Mouth: Kaibuskong Bay on Lake Talon
  - coordinates: 46°16′57″N 79°07′06″W
  - elevation: 196 m (643 ft)
- Length: 11 km (6.8 mi)

Basin features
- River system: Ottawa River drainage basin

The Kaibuskong River is a small river in Nipissing District in northeastern Ontario, Canada that runs south through the Township of Bonfield from its source at Lake Nosbonsing. The river flows over a small dam just north of its source, then through two small lakes, La Chappelle Lake and Sheedy Lake, before emptying into Kaibuskong Bay on Lake Talon, from which it flows as part of the Mattawa River system to the Ottawa River.

== See also ==
- List of rivers of Ontario
