= Jay Aspin =

Canadian politician (born 1949)

Jay Aspin OOnt

Member of Parliament for Nipissing—Timiskaming
- In office May 2, 2011 – October 19, 2015
- Preceded by: Anthony Rota
- Succeeded by: Anthony Rota

Personal details
- Born: August 19, 1949 (age 76) Westmount, Quebec, Canada
- Party: Conservative
- Profession: School trustee; business owner

Jay Aspin OOnt (born August 19, 1949) is a Canadian politician who served as the member of Parliament for the riding of Nipissing—Timiskaming from 2011 to 2015.

Aspin was elected to the House of Commons for the Conservative Party of Canada in the 2011 election. He finished just 14 votes ahead of Liberal incumbent Anthony Rota in the initial count, triggering an automatic judicial recount which ultimately confirmed his victory by a margin of just 18 votes.

Prior to his election, Aspin had served as a city councillor for North Bay City Council, as well as a trustee for the Near North District School Board and its predecessor, the Nipissing Board of Education. He also worked as a business consultant and for the Ontario Northland Transportation Commission. He was defeated in the 2000 North Bay City Council election.

Aspin was defeated in the 2015 federal election by Anthony Rota, whom Aspin previously defeated in 2011. Aspin lost by approximately 11,000 votes, garnering 14,000 votes in total.

In the 2018 North Bay Municipal Election, Aspin stood as a candidate for one of the four public school trustee positions in North Bay for the Near North District School Board. Aspin finished first among eight candidates and was elected to the board for the 2018–2022 term.

In 2024, Aspin was awarded the Order of Ontario, the province's highest honour recognizing outstanding people who have made exceptional contributions to building a strong province, nation, and world.
