= Nipissing—Timiskaming =

Federal electoral district in Ontario, Canada

Ontario electoral district
- Interactive map of riding boundaries from the 2025 federal election

Federal electoral district
- Legislature: House of Commons
MP
Pauline Rochefort
Liberal
- District created: 2003
- First contested: 2004
- Last contested: 2025
- District webpage: profile, map

Demographics
- Population (2011): 90,996
- Electors (2015): 70,342
- Area (km²): 15,313
- Pop. density (per km²): 5.9
- Census division(s): Nipissing District, Parry Sound District, Timiskaming District
- Census subdivision(s): North Bay, Temiskaming Shores, East Ferris, Callander, Powassan, Bonfield, Mattawa, Nipissing Township, Nipissing First Nation, Englehart

Nipissing—Timiskaming is a federal electoral district in Ontario, Canada, that has been represented in the House of Commons of Canada since 2004. The riding was formed by the amalgamation of the former Nipissing riding with the southeastern portion of the former Timiskaming—Cochrane riding. This riding lost small portions of territory to Timmins-James Bay and gained a small portion from Nickel Belt during the 2012 electoral redistribution.

The 2011 electoral results in this riding were challenged in court on the grounds that there were "irregularities, fraud or corrupt or illegal practices that affected the result of the election".

The seat's present federal MP is Pauline Rochefort, a member of the Liberal Party.

== Demographics ==
According to the 2021 Canadian census

Ethnic groups: 81.7% White, 14.9% Indigenous, 1.0% South Asian
Languages: 79.6% English, 13.8% French

Religions: 58.9% Christian (36.3% Catholic, 6.1% United Church, 4.0% Anglican, 1.1% Pentecostal, 1.0% Presbyterian, 10.4% Other), 39.2% None

Median income: $39,600 (2020)
Average income: $49,400 (2020)

This riding has elected the following members of the House of Commons of Canada:

Parliament	Years	Member	Party
Nipissing—Timiskaming; Riding created from Nipissing and Timiskaming—Cochrane
38th	2004–2006	Anthony Rota	Liberal
39th	2006–2008	Anthony Rota	Liberal
40th	2008–2011	Anthony Rota	Liberal
41st	2011–2015	Jay Aspin	Conservative
42nd	2015–2019	Anthony Rota	Liberal
43rd	2019–2021	Anthony Rota	Liberal
44th	2021–2025	Anthony Rota	Liberal
45th	2025–present	Pauline Rochefort	Liberal

== Election results ==
View source data.
Graph of election results in Nippissing—Tiskaming (minor parties that never got 2% of the vote or didn't run consistently are omitted)

2025 Canadian federal election
Party	Candidate	Votes	%	±%	Expenditures
Liberal	Pauline Rochefort	27,674	46.99	+10.13	
Conservative	Garry Keller	26,121	44.80	+12.92	
New Democratic	Valerie Kennedy	3,548	6.09	–17.24	
People's	John Janssen	648	1.11	–6.82	
Green	Louise Poitras	578	1.00	N/A	
Total valid votes/expense limit					
Total rejected ballots					
Turnout		58,576	68.04		
Eligible voters		84,549			
Liberal notional hold		Swing		–1.40	
Source: Elections Canada

2021 federal election redistributed results
Party	Vote	%
Liberal	19,007	36.86
Conservative	16,438	31.88
New Democratic	12,031	23.33
People's	4,088	7.93

2021 Canadian federal election
Party	Candidate	Votes	%	±%	Expenditures
Liberal	Anthony Rota	18,405	38.8	-1.8	$97,413.97
Conservative	Steven Trahan	15,104	31.8	+4.8	$85,201.35
New Democratic	Scott Robertson	10,493	22.1	+1.6	$14,631.29
People's	Gregory J. Galante	3,494	7.4	+2.2	$16,450.54
Total valid votes		47,496			
Total rejected ballots		337			
Turnout		47,833	63.20		
Eligible voters		75,689			
liberal hold		Swing		-3.3	
Source: Elections Canada

2019 Canadian federal election
Party	Candidate	Votes	%	±%	Expenditures
Liberal	Anthony Rota	19,352	40.55	–11.33	$105,794.62
Conservative	Jordy Carr	12,984	27.20	–2.10	$86,210.82
New Democratic	Rob Boulet	9,784	20.50	+4.26	$8,883.76
Green	Alex Gomm	3,111	6.52	+3.95	none listed
People's	Mark King	2,496	5.23	n/a	$24,007.08
Total valid votes/expense limit		47,727	99.15		
Total rejected ballots		407	0.85	+0.39	
Turnout		48,134	64.13	–4.17	
Eligible voters		75,052			
Liberal hold		Swing		–4.61	
Source: Elections Canada

2015 Canadian federal election
Party	Candidate	Votes	%	±%	Expenditures
Liberal	Anthony Rota	25,357	51.88	+15.39	$111,880.91
Conservative	Jay Aspin	14,325	29.31	-7.10	$88,713.85
New Democratic	Kathleen Jodouin	7,936	16.24	-4.89	$25,717.06
Green	Nicole Peltier	1,257	2.57	-3.40	$2,243.82
Total valid votes/Expense limit		48,875	99.54		$218,149.29
Total rejected ballots		224	0.46		
Turnout		49,099	68.31		
Eligible voters		71,879			
Liberal notional hold		Swing		+11.24	
Source: Elections Canada

Despite the fact that 99% of this riding stayed the same after the 2012 redistribution, based on the results of the 2011 election — in which Aspin defeated Rota by a margin of just 18 votes — the minor boundary changes were enough to make the seat a notional Liberal riding. The riding lost two Conservative voting areas in the north (Hudson Township and Harris Township) while gaining the Nipissing 10 Indian Reserve, where the Tories finished third.

2011 federal election redistributed results
Party	Vote	%
Liberal	15,405	36.49
Conservative	15,369	36.41
New Democratic	8,919	21.13
Green	2,520	5.97

2011 Canadian federal election
Party	Candidate	Votes	%	±%	Expenditures
Conservative	Jay Aspin	15,495	36.7	+4.4	–
Liberal	Anthony Rota	15,477	36.6	-8.0	–
New Democratic	Rona Eckert	8,781	20.8	+5.0	–
Green	Scott Daley	2,518	6.0	-0.8	–
Total valid votes/Expense limit		42,271	100.0	–	
Total rejected ballots		225	0.5	+0.1	
Turnout		42,496	60.5	+6.8	
Eligible voters		70,244	–	–	
Conservative gain from Liberal		Swing		+6.2	

Note: This vote was subject to mandatory recount because of the margin of win being less than 1/1000 of the total votes.

2008 Canadian federal election
Party	Candidate	Votes	%	±%	Expenditures
Liberal	Anthony Rota	18,510	44.6	–0.1	$77,997
Conservative	Joe Sinicrope	13,432	32.3	–2.2	$81,801
New Democratic	Dianna Allen	6,582	15.8	–1.5	$8,409
Green	Craig Bridges	2,808	6.8	+3.3	$10,803
Canadian Action	Andrew Moulden	204	0.5	–	
Total valid votes/Expense limit		41,536	100.0	$87,383	
Total rejected ballots		167	0.4	0.0	
Turnout		41,703	~58.2	-9.4	
Liberal hold		Swing		+2.1	

2006 Canadian federal election
Party	Candidate	Votes	%	±%
Liberal	Anthony Rota	21,393	44.7	+2.4
Conservative	Peter Chirico	16,511	34.5	–2.6
New Democratic	Dave Fluri	8,268	17.3	+0.3
Green	Meg Purdy	1,698	3.5	+0.4
Total valid votes		47,870	100.0	
Total rejected ballots		211	0.4	-0.1
Turnout		48,081	67.6	+5.2
Liberal hold		Swing		+2.5

2004 Canadian federal election
Party	Candidate	Votes	%
Liberal	Anthony Rota	18,254	42.3
Conservative	Al McDonald	16,001	37.1
New Democratic	Dave Fluri	7,354	17.0
Green	Les Wilcox	1,329	3.1
Canadian Action	Ross MacLean	204	0.5
Total valid votes		43,142	100.0
Total rejected ballots		222	0.5
Turnout		43,364	62.4

== See also ==
- List of Canadian electoral districts
- Historical federal electoral districts of Canada
