= Anthony Rota =

Canadian politician (born 1961)

The Honourable Anthony Rota PC
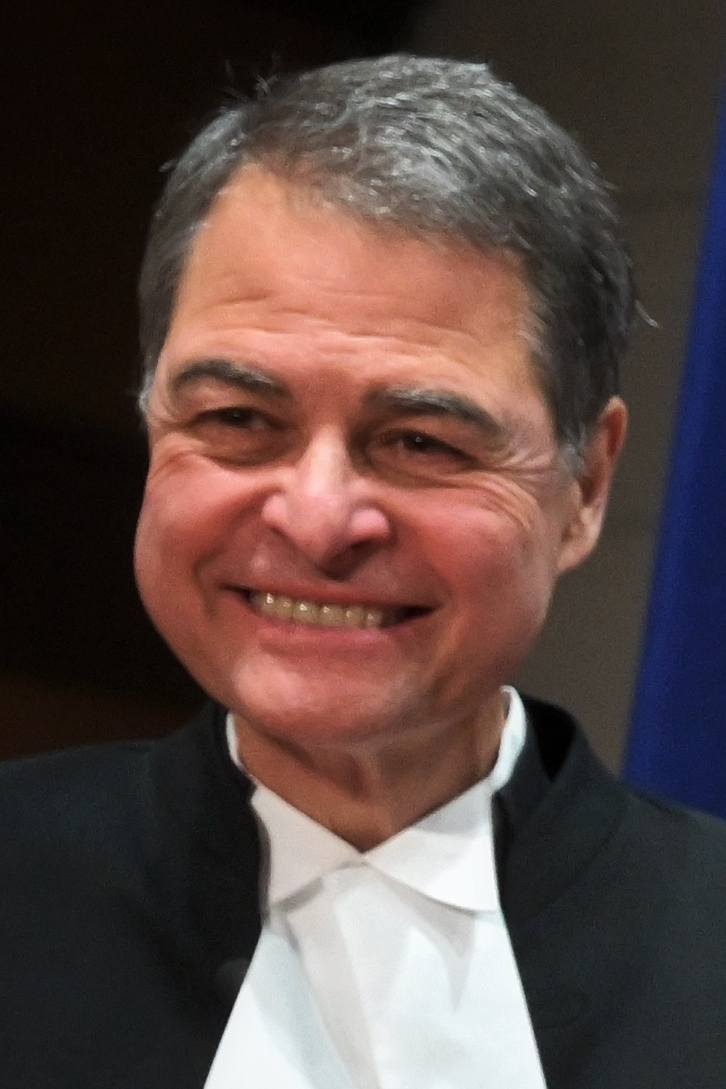
- Rota in 2023

37th Speaker of the House of Commons
- In office December 5, 2019 – September 27, 2023
- Preceded by: Geoff Regan
- Succeeded by: Louis Plamondon

Member of Parliament for Nipissing—Timiskaming
- In office October 19, 2015 – March 23, 2025
- Preceded by: Jay Aspin
- Succeeded by: Pauline Rochefort
- In office June 28, 2004 – May 2, 2011
- Preceded by: Bob Wood
- Succeeded by: Jay Aspin

Chairman of the COVID-19 Committee
- In office April 20, 2020 – June 18, 2020
- Preceded by: Office established
- Succeeded by: Office abolished

Personal details
- Born: Anthony Michael Gerard Rota; May 15, 1961 (age 65) North Bay, Ontario, Canada
- Party: Liberal
- Spouse: Chantal Piché-Rota
- Children: 1
- Profession: Administrator; business advisor

Anthony Michael Gerard Rota PC (born May 15, 1961) is a Canadian politician who served as the 37th speaker of the House of Commons from 2019 to 2023. A member of the Liberal Party, he served as the member of Parliament (MP) for the riding of Nipissing—Timiskaming until 2025. He previously represented Nipissing—Timiskaming as MP from 2004 to 2011. In 2019, he was elected by the House of Commons to be the speaker in the 43rd Parliament and in 2021 was re-elected in the 44th Parliament.

On September 27, 2023, he resigned as speaker due to the honouring of former Waffen-SS "Galicia" Ukrainian veteran Yaroslav Hunka in the House of Commons, triggering the 2023 speakership election.

== Early life and career ==
Rota was born in North Bay, Ontario, in 1961, to a family from Cosenza, Italy. He holds a Bachelor of Arts in political science from Wilfrid Laurier University, a diploma in finance from Algonquin College and a Master of Business Administration degree from the University of Ottawa.

Prior to his election, Rota worked for the Industrial Research Assistance Program as regional manager for Ontario. He has also served with the Canadian Technology Network in Ottawa and has worked in the private sector. He is fluent in English, French, Italian and Spanish.

== Political career ==
Rota began his political career at the municipal level, serving as a city councillor for North Bay City Council from 1994 to 1997, chairing the city's planning and economic development committee. He won the federal Liberal Party of Canada nomination for Nipissing—Timiskaming in early 2004, defeating rival candidates Susan Church, Hugh McLachlan and Joe Sinicrope with 52% on the second ballot. In the general election held in June of that year, he narrowly defeated Conservative candidate Al McDonald.

Rota was re-elected in the 2006 election, defeating the Conservative Party's Peter Chirico, the NDP's Dave Fluri, and the Green Party's Meg Purdy. In the 2008 election, he was again reelected. He served as the Liberal Party caucus chair, and as critic for the Federal Economic Development Initiative for Northern Ontario.

Rota ran again in the 2011 election and lost by a reported 14 votes to Jay Aspin of the Conservative Party. Due to the narrow margin, an automatic judicial recount was required, confirming the margin at 18 votes. After his 2011 loss, he began teaching at Nipissing University in North Bay, Ontario.

In the 2015 election, Rota was again the Liberal candidate, defeating Aspin to again become an MP in the 42nd Canadian Parliament. On December 9, 2015, he was appointed Assistant Deputy Chair of Committees of the Whole. He was reelected in the 2019 election.

=== As Speaker of the House of Commons ===
Following the 2019 Federal Election, during the 43rd Canadian Parliament he was elected as 37th speaker of the House of Commons on December 5, 2019, by winning a ranked ballot between himself, Joël Godin, Carol Hughes, Geoff Regan (the speaker during the previous Parliament) and Bruce Stanton. Following Rota's win, the Conservatives said that he had them to thank for his new position. They had made the decision to unseat Regan as a show of strength during a caucus meeting. They did so by ranking Regan further down on the ranked ballot.

On June 17, 2020, Rota ordered that NDP Leader Jagmeet Singh be removed from the House of Commons after referring to Bloc Québécois MP Alain Therrien as a racist.

==== Document disclosure court challenge ====
In July 2021, the Liberal government took the unprecedented step of taking Speaker Rota to court after Rota ruled that the government did not have the legal authority to withhold documents requested by members of Parliament. The documents requested related to the transfer of samples of the level 4 viruses from the National Microbiology Laboratory in Winnipeg to the Wuhan Institute of Virology in China and the lab's dismissal of two of its scientists.

Subsequently, Speaker Rota reprimanded Iain Stewart, the President of the Public Health Agency of Canada for PHAC's contempt of Parliament, after Stewart failed to comply with multiple House and Commons committee orders to produce these unredacted documents.

The Liberal government’s legal challenge centered on whether or not courts can overrule the Parliamentary powers under the Westminster system. Speaker Rota had upheld the principle that the judiciary has no jurisdiction over the operations of the House and that only Parliament can decide how the law applies to its institutions.

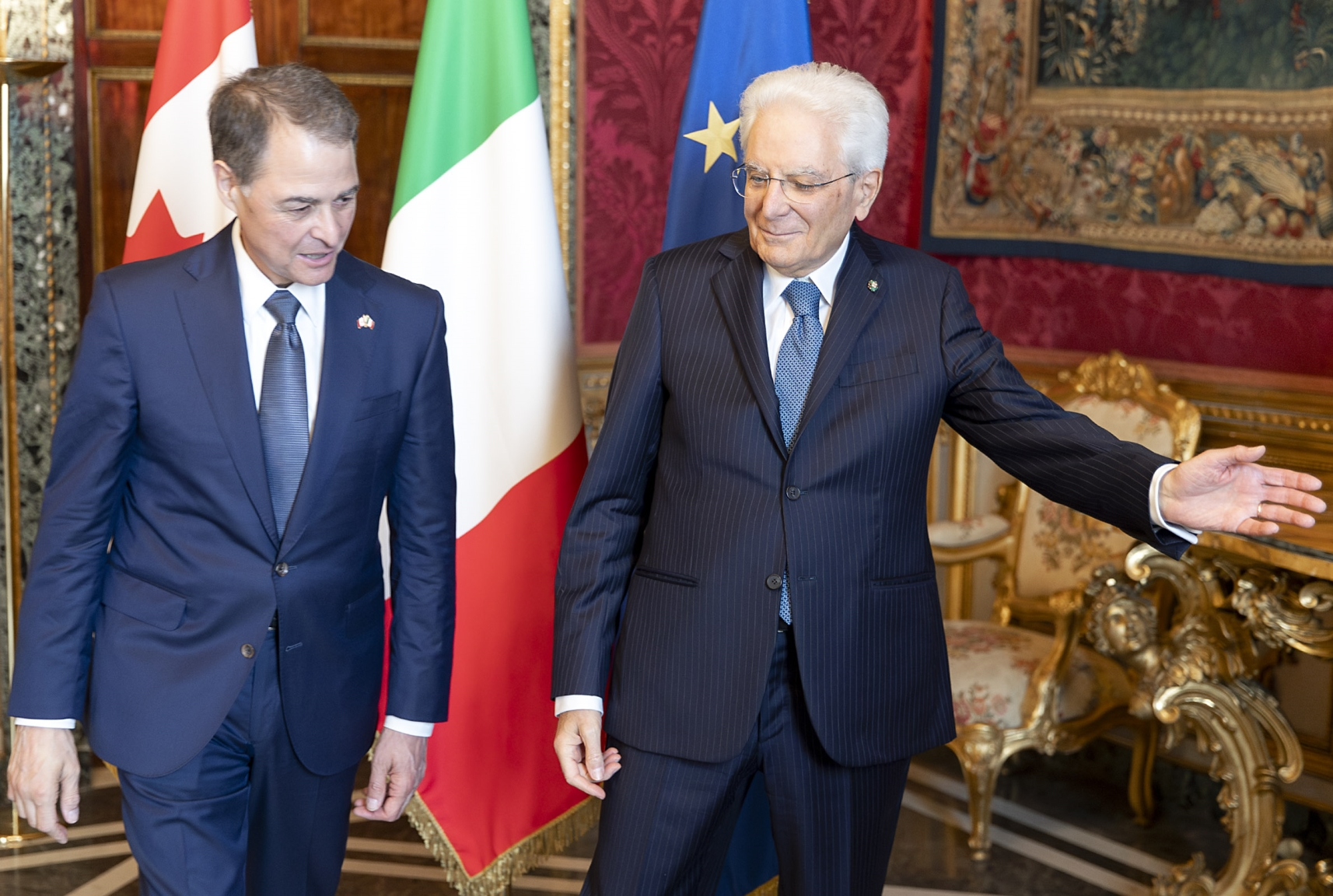
Rota with Sergio Mattarella in Italy in 2023

The Liberal government subsequently dropped the court application after Prime Minister Justin Trudeau called an election in August, dissolving Parliament and thus terminating all business before the House, including the orders to produce the PHAC documents.

On November 22, 2021, Rota was reelected as the speaker of the House of Commons. In an interview with CBC Radio on September 18, 2023, Rota announced that he would not be running for re-election and that the 2021 election would be his last.

==== Scandal and resignation as Speaker ====
On September 22, 2023, following an address to the Canadian parliament by visiting Ukrainian president Volodymyr Zelenskyy, Rota introduced and recognized Yaroslav Hunka, a Ukrainian-Canadian retiree from North Bay, in the parliamentary galleries. He identified Hunka as a "war hero" who fought for the First Ukrainian Division, saying, "We have here in the chamber today a Ukrainian Canadian war veteran from the Second World War who fought for Ukrainian independence against the Russians and continues to support the troops today even at his age of 98. His name is Yaroslav Hunka. I am very proud to say that he is from North Bay and from my riding of Nipissing—Timiskaming. He is a Ukrainian hero and a Canadian hero, and we thank him for all his service. Thank you." Following Rota's introduction, Hunka was applauded with two standing ovations by members of all parties.

Subsequent media reports identified Hunka as a member of the 14th Waffen Grenadier Division (also known as the 1st Galician Division) of Nazi Germany's Waffen-SS during the Second World War; the unit was responsible for anti-partisan reprisals in Poland, Slovakia and the Austria–Slovenia border. Rota issued an apology two days after his initial statement, saying, "In my remarks following the address of the president of Ukraine, I recognized an individual in the gallery. I have subsequently become aware of more information which causes me to regret my decision to do so." Rota apologized to "Jewish communities in Canada and around the world" and accepted responsibility for his action, saying that neither the Ukrainian delegation nor other MPs were aware that he would recognize Hunka. The next day, he faced increasing demands from political parties and organizations to resign.

On September 26, 2023, Rota announced his resignation as House Speaker, effective on September 27. Rota was the seventh House Speaker to resign in Canadian history, and the first to do so since John Bosley in 1986. Following his resignation, Louis Plamondon of the Bloc Québécois became interim Speaker until Greg Fergus was elected the new Speaker.

Rota remained a Liberal MP until the 2025 federal election, when his riding was won by Liberal candidate Pauline Rochefort. His annual pension from serving as an MP for 16 years was estimated to be $113,000 in 2025, according to lobby group Canadian Taxpayers Federation.

== Electoral record ==
=== Federal ===
2021 Canadian federal election: Nipissing—Timiskaming
Party	Candidate	Votes	%	±%	Expenditures
Liberal	Anthony Rota	18,405	38.8	-1.8	$97,413.97
Conservative	Steven Trahan	15,104	31.8	+4.8	$85,201.35
New Democratic	Scott Robertson	10,493	22.1	+1.6	$14,631.29
People's	Gregory J. Galante	3,494	7.4	+2.2	$16,450.54
Total valid votes		47,496			
Total rejected ballots		337			
Turnout		47,833	63.20		
Eligible voters		75,689			
liberal hold		Swing		-3.3	
Source: Elections Canada

2019 Canadian federal election: Nipissing—Timiskaming
Party	Candidate	Votes	%	±%	Expenditures
Liberal	Anthony Rota	19,352	40.55	–11.33	$105,794.62
Conservative	Jordy Carr	12,984	27.20	–2.10	$86,210.82
New Democratic	Rob Boulet	9,784	20.50	+4.26	$8,883.76
Green	Alex Gomm	3,111	6.52	+3.95	none listed
People's	Mark King	2,496	5.23	n/a	$24,007.08
Total valid votes/expense limit		47,727	99.15		
Total rejected ballots		407	0.85	+0.39	
Turnout		48,134	64.13	–4.17	
Eligible voters		75,052			
Liberal hold		Swing		–4.61	
Source: Elections Canada

2015 Canadian federal election: Nipissing—Timiskaming
Party	Candidate	Votes	%	±%	Expenditures
Liberal	Anthony Rota	25,357	51.9	+15.41	–
Conservative	Jay Aspin	14,325	29.3	−7.11	–
New Democratic	Kathleen Jodouin	7,936	16.2	−4.93	–
Green	Nicole Peltier	1,257	2.6	−3.37	–
Total valid votes/Expense limit		48,875	100.0		$217,533.50
Total rejected ballots		224	0.45	−0.05	
Turnout		49,099	69.32	+8.82	
Eligible voters		70,820			
Liberal gain from Conservative		Swing		+11.26	
Source: Elections Canada

2011 Canadian federal election: Nipissing—Timiskaming
Party	Candidate	Votes	%	±%	Expenditures
Conservative	Jay Aspin	15,495	36.7	+4.4	–
Liberal	Anthony Rota	15,477	36.6	−8.0	–
New Democratic	Rona Eckert	8,781	20.8	+5.0	–
Green	Scott Daley	2,518	6.0	−0.8	–
Total valid votes/Expense limit		42,271	100.0	–	
Total rejected ballots		225	0.5	+0.1	
Turnout		42,496	60.5	+6.8	
Eligible voters		70,244	–	–	
Conservative gain from Liberal		Swing		+6.2	
This vote was subject to mandatory recount because of the margin of win being less than 1/1000 of the total votes.

2008 Canadian federal election: Nipissing—Timiskaming
Party	Candidate	Votes	%	±%	Expenditures
Liberal	Anthony Rota	18,510	44.6	–0.1	$77,997
Conservative	Joe Sinicrope	13,432	32.3	–2.2	$81,801
New Democratic	Dianna Allen	6,582	15.8	–1.5	$8,409
Green	Craig Bridges	2,808	6.8	+3.3	$10,803
Canadian Action	Andrew Moulden	204	0.5	–	
Total valid votes/Expense limit		41,536	100.0	$87,383	
Total rejected ballots		167	0.4	0.0	
Turnout		41,703	~58.2	−9.4	
Liberal hold		Swing		+2.1	

2006 Canadian federal election: Nipissing—Timiskaming
Party	Candidate	Votes	%	±%
Liberal	Anthony Rota	21,393	44.7	+2.4
Conservative	Peter Chirico	16,511	34.5	–2.6
New Democratic	Dave Fluri	8,268	17.3	+0.3
Green	Meg Purdy	1,698	3.5	+0.4
Total valid votes		47,870	100.0	
Total rejected ballots		211	0.4	−0.1
Turnout		48,081	67.6	+5.2
Liberal hold		Swing		+2.5

2004 Canadian federal election: Nipissing—Timiskaming
Party	Candidate	Votes	%
Liberal	Anthony Rota	18,254	42.3
Conservative	Al McDonald	16,001	37.1
New Democratic	Dave Fluri	7,354	17.0
Green	Les Wilcox	1,329	3.1
Canadian Action	Ross MacLean	204	0.5
Total valid votes		43,142	100.0
Total rejected ballots		222	0.5
Turnout		43,364	62.4

=== Municipal ===
1994 North Bay City Council election 10 to be elected
Candidate	Votes	%
Lynne Bennett (X)	9,913	6.95
Anthony Rota	9,070	6.36
Peter Handley	9,055	6.35
Laurie Kidd	8,859	6.21
George Maroosis (X)	8,651	6.07
Jack Smylie (X)	8,571	6.01
Jay Aspin (X)	8,528	5.98
Wayne Poeta	8,346	5.85
Terry Talentino	7,545	5.29
Arne Schmidt (X)	7,480	5.24
Frank O'Hagan (X)	7,178	5.03
Sarah Campbell	6,902	4.84
Don King (X)	5,819	4.08
Peter Baker	5,404	3.79
Gillian Spencer	4,823	3.38
Dick Prescott	4,069	2.85
Bernie MacDonald	3,646	2.56
Preston Quirt	3,297	2.31
Gerry Cardinal	3,181	2.23
Kevin Kendall	3,037	2.13
Miles Peters	2,778	1.95
Mike Gelinas	2,310	1.62
Louis Brown	2,007	1.41
Scott Porter	1,348	0.95
Bill Philippe	814	0.57

== Arms ==
Coat of arms of Anthony Rota
Adopted Granted 15 November 2021. Crest A phoenix displayed wings inverted Or embellished Gules supporting the mace of the House of Commons of Canada palewise Or Escutcheon Gules a wheel Or between in each corner a trillium flower Argent Supporters Dexter an Italian wolf sinister an eastern wolf both standing on a rocky mount proper set with a yin-yang symbol Argent and Sable and strewn with maple leaves Gules lilies and trillium flowers proper Motto Integritas Fidentiaque (Latin for 'Integrity and Resolve') Other elements Baton badge of the Speaker of the House of Commons of Canada
