= North Bay City Council =

Governing body of North Bay, Ontario, Canada

History
- Founded: 1891

Leadership
- Mayor: Peter Chirico since November 15, 2022
- Seats: 11

Elections
- Last election: 2022

Meeting place
- North Bay City Council Chamber

Website
- www.city.north-bay.on.ca/cityhall/council/

North Bay City Council is the governing body of the city of North Bay, Ontario, Canada.

Unlike many Canadian city councils, North Bay does not elect its council on a ward system. Instead, all councillors are elected at-large, and the ten candidates with the most votes are declared elected to council. Unlike the similar system in place for Vancouver City Council elections, however, North Bay municipal politics does not have a political party system.

The councillor with the most votes serves as deputy mayor, while the second and third-place finishers chair the council's two primary committees, community services and public works and engineering.

As in other Ontario municipalities, the council may choose to fill a vacancy either by scheduling a by-election or by directly appointing a new councillor to the seat. Due to the city's at-large electoral system, if the appointment process is chosen then the first right to fill a vacant seat is generally offered to the next highest unelected finisher in the previous municipal election. For instance, when Peter Chirico resigned from council in May 2012, Sarah Campbell, the eleventh-place candidate in the 2010 election, was appointed to his seat. Following the resignation of Sean Lawlor from council in November 2013, twelfth-place finisher Mark King was the next in line to be appointed to the vacant seat, and was appointed to council as of January 6, 2014.

== 1994-1997 ==
Council elected in the 1994 election:

Councillor	Notes
Jack Burrows	Mayor
Jay Aspin	
Lynne Bennett	Deputy mayor
Peter Handley	
Laurie Kidd	
George Maroosis	
Wayne Poeta	
Anthony Rota	
Arne Schmidt	
Jack Smylie	
Terry Talentino	

== 1997-2000 ==
Council elected in the 1997 election:

Councillor	Notes
Jack Burrows	Mayor
Jay Aspin	
Lynne Bennett	Deputy mayor
Maureen Boldt	
Sarah Campbell	
Peter Handley	
George Maroosis	
Wayne Poeta	
Murray Shave	
Jack Smylie	
Terry Talentino	

== 2000-2003 ==
Council elected in the 2000 election:

Councillor	Notes
Jack Burrows	Mayor
Mike Anthony	
Lynne Bennett	
Maureen Boldt	
Sarah Campbell	
Peter Chirico	
Susan Church	
Peter Handley	
Laurie Kidd	
George Maroosis	
Al McDonald	Deputy mayor

== 2003-2006 ==
Council elected in the 2003 election:

Councillor	Notes
Vic Fedeli	Mayor
Mike Anthony	
Mac Bain	
Maureen Boldt	
Sarah Campbell	
Peter Chirico	Deputy mayor
Judy Koziol	
George Maroosis	
Tom Mason	
Dave Mendicino	
Darryl Vaillancourt	

== 2006-2010 ==
Council elected in the 2006 election:

Councillor	Notes
Vic Fedeli	Mayor
Mike Anthony	
Mac Bain	
Sarah Campbell	
Peter Chirico	Deputy mayor
Tom Graham	
Judy Koziol	
Chris Mayne	
Dave Mendicino	
Darryl Vaillancourt	
Tanya Vrebosch-Merry	

== 2010-2014 ==
Council elected in the 2010 election:

Councillor	Notes
Al McDonald	Mayor
Mike Anthony	
Mac Bain	
Peter Chirico	Deputy mayor to May 2012
Judy Koziol	
Sean Lawlor	Deputy mayor after May 2012 Resigned from council on November 18, 2013.
George Maroosis	
Chris Mayne	
Dave Mendicino	
Darryl Vaillancourt	
Tanya Vrebosch	Deputy mayor after November 2013.
Sarah Campbell	Reappointed to council in 2012.
Mark King	Appointed to council in 2014.

In May 2012, Peter Chirico resigned his seat as the city's deputy mayor to take a job as managing director of community services in the city's administrative staff. Sean Lawlor succeeded him as deputy mayor, and Sarah Campbell, a former city councillor who narrowly lost re-election in 2010, was reappointed to fill the vacant council seat. Lawlor subsequently resigned from council on November 18, 2013.

== 2014-2018 ==
Council elected in the 2014 election:

Councillor	Notes
Al McDonald	Mayor
Mike Anthony	
Mac Bain	
Sheldon Forgette	Deputy mayor
Mark King	
George Maroosis	
Chris Mayne	
Jeff Serran	
Derek Shogren	
Daryl Vaillancourt	
Tanya Vrebosch	

== 2018-2022 ==
Council elected in the 2018 election:

Councillor	Notes
Al McDonald	Mayor
Mike Anthony	
Mac Bain	
Johanne Brousseau	
Mark King	
Chris Mayne	
Dave Mendicino	
Scott Robertson	
Marcus Tignanelli	
Bill Vrebosch	
Tanya Vrebosch	Deputy mayor

== 2022-2026 ==
Council elected in the 2022 election:

Councillor	Notes
Peter Chirico	Mayor
Mac Bain	
Gary Gardiner	
Maggie Horsfield	Deputy Mayor
Sara Inch	
Mark King	
Jamie Lowery	
Justine Mallah	
Chris Mayne	
Lana Mitchell	
Tanya Vrebosch	
