= List of mayors of North Bay, Ontario =

This is a list of mayors of North Bay, Ontario. The mayor presides over North Bay City Council.

== Mayors ==
1. John Bourke (first mayor, 1891)
2. William McKenzie (1892-1893)
3. Richard Bunyan (1894)
4. Dr J.B. Carruthers (1895)
5. Michael Brennan (1896)
6. Thomas N. Colgan (1897-1898)
7. J.M. McNamara (1899-1900)
8. J.G. Cormack (1901)
9. J. W. Richardson (1902)
10. William McKenzie (1903-1904)
11. David Purvis (1905-1906)
12. Wm Milne (1907-1908)
13. Robert Rankin (1909-1910)
14. G.A. McGaughey (1911-1912)
15. George Lee (1913-1914)
16. James McIlvenna (1915-1916)
17. T.J. Patton (1917-1918)
18. John Ferguson (1919-1922)
19. John McDonald (1923-1925)
20. D Barker (1926-1927)
21. E.L. Banner (1928-1929)
22. Robert Rowe (1930-1931)
23. J.W. Richardson (1932-1933)
24. W.G. Bullbrook (1934-1936)
25. Robert Rowe (1937-1938)
26. Arthur Beattie (1939-1940)
27. C.R. Harrison (1941-1942)
28. D.G. Stevens (1943)
29. W.F. Stones (1944-1946)
30. J.L. Shaw (1947)
31. Ced Price (1948-1949)
32. T.M. Palmer (1950-1951)
33. Arthur Beattie (1952-1953)
34. Merle Dickerson (1954-1960)
35. Cecil Hewitt (1961-1965)
36. Merle Dickerson (1966-1971)
37. Bruce Goulet (1972-1973)
38. Merle Dickerson (1974-1980)
39. Jack Smylie (1980-1982)
40. Merle Dickerson (1982-1984)
41. Stan Lawlor (1984-1994)
42. Jack Burrows (1994-2003)
43. Vic Fedeli (2003 - November 30, 2010)
44. Al McDonald (December 1, 2010 - 2022)
45. Peter Chirico (2022 - present)
