= Vic Fedeli =

Canadian politician

The Honourable Vic Fedeli ECO MPP
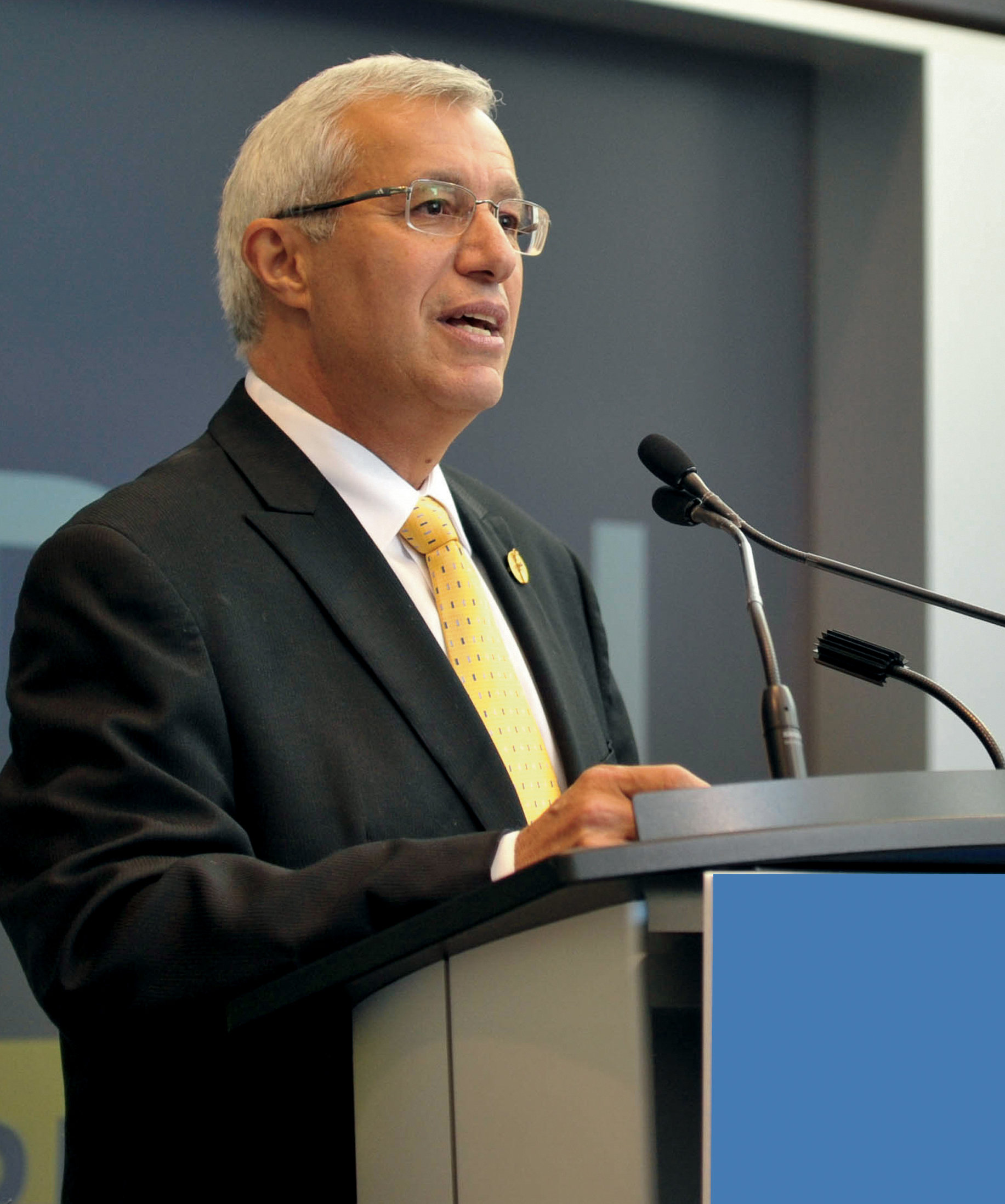
- Fedeli in 2014

Ontario Minister of Economic Development, Job Creation and Trade
- Incumbent
- Assumed office June 20, 2019
- Premier: Doug Ford
- Preceded by: Todd Smith

Chair of Cabinet
- Incumbent
- Assumed office June 29, 2018
- Premier: Doug Ford
- Preceded by: Helena Jaczek

Ontario Minister of Finance
- In office June 29, 2018 – June 20, 2019
- Premier: Doug Ford
- Preceded by: Charles Sousa
- Succeeded by: Rod Phillips

Leader of the Official Opposition
- In office January 26, 2018 – June 29, 2018
- Preceded by: Patrick Brown
- Succeeded by: Andrea Horwath

Interim Leader of the Progressive Conservative Party of Ontario
- In office January 26, 2018 – March 10, 2018
- Preceded by: Patrick Brown
- Succeeded by: Doug Ford

Member of the Ontario Provincial Parliament for Nipissing
- Incumbent
- Assumed office October 6, 2011
- Preceded by: Monique Smith

43rd Mayor of North Bay
- In office December 1, 2003 – November 30, 2010
- Deputy: Peter Chirico
- Preceded by: Jack Burrows
- Succeeded by: Al McDonald

Personal details
- Born: Victor Anthony Fedeli; August 8, 1956 (age 69) North Bay, Ontario, Canada
- Party: Progressive Conservative
- Spouse: Patty Kelly
- Occupation: Businessman; politician

Victor Anthony Fedeli ECO MPP (born August 8, 1956) is a Canadian politician who has been the Ontario minister of economic development, job creation and trade since 2019 and chair of Cabinet since 2018. He is the member of Provincial Parliament (MPP) for Nipissing, and has held his seat for the Progressive Conservative (PC) Party since 2011. Fedeli has previously served as the province's minister of finance, leader of the Official Opposition, and interim leader of the PC Party. He was mayor of North Bay from 2003 to 2010. He stood as a candidate in the 2015 Ontario PC leadership race, but ultimately withdrew and endorsed Christine Elliott.

Prior to his entry into politics, Fedeli founded the advertising company Fedeli Advertising in his hometown of North Bay. He was on the police services board, and in the local chamber of commerce.

== Background ==
=== Personal life ===
Fedeli was born and raised in North Bay, to Lena (née Fava) Fedeli and Albino Rodolfo “Hub" Fedeli. He is of Italian ancestry. He studied visual communications at Conestoga College and business at Nipissing University.

Fedeli and his wife Patty (née Kelly) reside in Corbeil, Ontario. They have no children.

=== Fedeli Corporation ===
In 1978, Fedeli returned to North Bay and opened Fedeli Advertising, which, in 1989, the Profit ranked his firm as one of 50 best places to work in Canada. Fedeli was also recognized as one of Canada's Most successful entrepreneurs in an episode of MoneyMakers. Fedeli Advertising was sold in 1992.

== Community service ==
=== Local service ===
Fedeli served ten terms on the board of the North Bay and District Chamber of Commerce, including as president in 1986. He has also served on the area's police board, health board, and conservation authority.

Fedeli was recognized for his work in North Bay with the non-profit Air Base Property Corporation (ABPC), where he served as chairman from inception until 2002. His time there included a lawsuit against the federal government which resulted in a $3 million award to ABPC. Fedeli was named North Bay's Citizen of the Year in 1999.

Fedeli received the Rotary International Paul Harris Fellowship in 1999, the Queen's Golden Jubilee Medal in 2002, and the Queen's Diamond Jubilee Medal in 2012. He was appointed honorary lieutenant colonel of The Algonquin Regiment in 2010, and honorary colonel in 2013. Internationally, Fedeli served as a director with Global Vision.

=== Philanthropy ===
Fedeli served as chair of several local fundraising campaigns and has provided nearly $2 million in area donations. His donations to Canadore College include $250,000 to fund the Vittorio Fedeli Business Centre (named after Fedeli's grandfather), $100,000 to construct a lecture hall named after his father, and $100,000 for the Centre for All Media. Subsequently, Canadore College enlisted him to serve as chair of their campaign to fund a School of Aviation.

He funded the Critical Care Unit at the North Bay Regional Health Center with a $150,000 donation, and funded the Family Center at the Nipissing Serenity Hospice with a further $150,000 donation. Area libraries and other educational facilities also feature Fedeli rooms.

As mayor of North Bay, Fedeli chose to donate his annual salary to various charities. He provided the media with an auditor's statement each year, outlining the $350,000 in donations.

== Political career ==
=== Mayor of North Bay ===
Fedeli ran for mayor of North Bay in the 2003 mayoral election, and was elected with 75% of the vote. In office, he focused on fiscal prudence that led him into frequent conflict with Liberal MPP Monique Smith. Fedeli and Smith sparred over the level of funding the city received from the Province of Ontario, specifically its share of the Ontario Municipal Partnership Fund.

To raise revenues and increase residential development in the city, Fedeli undertook the sale of surplus publicly owned lands. This led to 115 parcels of property being sold, bringing in about $8 million, and greater housing construction, including the gentrification of many areas of the city.

In the 2006 mayoral election, Fedeli was challenged by Stan Lawlor. Despite Lawlor's high profile as a former mayor and candidate for the Liberal Party of Ontario, Fedeli was re-elected with more than two-thirds of the vote.

In 2009, Fedeli successfully launched an effort to win an exemption for Canadian businesses from the Buy American provision of the American Recovery and Reinvestment Act of 2009. He championed a mayor-to-mayor campaign, calling U.S. mayors of cities exporting to his hometown.

Fedeli's time as mayor was also marked by investments in social housing, the only municipality to do so, and the development of a methane-powered generation facility at the municipal landfill, also unique among communities the size of North Bay. Total building starts hit a record of $92 million in 2009, compared with a 10-year average of $35 million before Fedeli was mayor. Before the end of Fedeli's term, the city's credit rating with Moody had jumped five levels to AA1, their highest possible rating.

On February 1, 2010, Fedeli announced he would not seek a third term as mayor in the October municipal election, keeping his promise from his first campaign in 2003 that he would only serve two terms. Fedeli stated "his work was done; his Council had restored hope and restored solvency."

=== Provincial politics ===
==== Nipissing MPP ====
On January 13, 2011, Fedeli announced his candidacy to be the Progressive Conservative candidate in the 2011 provincial election. The only other candidate at the time was Bill Vrebosch, mayor of East Ferris, who had run against then-MPP Monique Smith in the 2007 Ontario election. Vrebosch dropped out of the race soon after, citing family health concerns, and Fedeli was acclaimed the PC candidate on February 26, 2010. He won the seat on election day over Liberal candidate Catherine Whiting, New Democratic candidate Henri Giroux and Green Party candidate Scott Haig with more than half the valid votes cast. Fedeli was re-elected in the 2014 election, in the 2018 election, in the 2022 election, and again in the 2025 election.

==== Critic roles ====
Following the 2011 election, PC Leader Tim Hudak named Fedeli as Energy critic and the Northern Development and Mines critic. However, after Frank Klees abandoned his bid for Speaker, Hudak assigned him the Transportation critic portfolio, which was previously the responsibility of Norm Miller. Miller was then appointed critic for Northern Development and Mines. On September 10, 2013, it was announced that Fedeli would be replacing Peter Shurman as PC Finance critic.

Fedeli's coverage of the energy portfolio coincided with growing opposition in rural Ontario to the governing Liberals' Green Energy Act, and the controversy over the Liberal's cancellation of gas-fired electricity generating stations in Oakville and Mississauga. Fedeli was named PC lead on the Standing Committee on Justice Policy, investigating the circumstances surrounding the gas plant cancellations. On June 6, 2013, Fedeli and fellow Progressive Conservative Rob Leone wrote to Ontario Provincial Police Commissioner Chris Lewis asking him to order an investigation into "theft of taxpayer property and breach of public trust" in relation to the deletion and removal of emails from government computers. The scandal contributed to the resignation of Premier Dalton McGuinty and Energy Minister Chris Bentley. It also led to the arrest and conviction of David Livingston, McGuinty's chief of staff.

==== ONTC divestment ====
On March 23, 2012, the province announced it would be selling the Ontario Northland Transportation Commission (ONTC). The ONTC is headquartered in North Bay, and several hundred workers employed within Nipissing would have been directly impacted by the move. The divestiture announcement was largely unanticipated as then-Liberal leader Dalton McGuinty had signed a pledge in 2002 to not privatize the corporation.

In April, Fedeli revealed that the ONTC pension plan was underfunded by $150 million and challenged Northern Development and Mines Minister Rick Bartolucci to clarify the status of ONTC retirees' pensions and benefits.

One of the charges levelled at the government over their handling of the ONTC file was that there had been a lack of consultation. In an effort to draw a contrast with this, Fedeli and his caucus colleague Norm Miller undertook a tour of northern communities to meet with various stakeholders in June 2012. The same month, Fedeli claimed the government would realize 'no savings' with the divestiture of the ONTC.

With the election of Kathleen Wynne as Liberal leader and premier, a new cabinet was sworn in on February 11, 2013. Michael Gravelle took over the Ministry of Northern Development and Mines file and soon announced there would be no dramatic change in direction for the ONTC. On March 6, 2013, at Fedeli's request the Standing Committee on Public Accounts asked the auditor general to investigate the divestiture of the ONTC. On May 1, Fedeli claimed he had numbers showing the ONTC divestment would cost the government $530 million more than earlier estimates. Soon thereafter, Gravelle disclosed to a meeting of the Federation of Northern Ontario Municipalities in Parry Sound that "[w]e need to be open to options other than divestment", a shift in direction that he attributed to feedback he had received since taking over the northern development and mines portfolio.

On September 18, 2013, the Standing Committee on Estimates approved a motion brought forward by Fedeli ordering the release of Ministry of Finance Documents relating to the ONTC in the months prior to the 2011 election.

Following Patrick Brown's ouster as PC leader and leader of the official opposition, Fedeli assumed these positions on an interim basis.

==== In government ====
On June 29, 2018, Fedeli was sworn in as finance minister under newly the elected premier, Doug Ford. He was also appointed chair of Cabinet.

After less than a year in the finance portfolio, Fedeli shuffled into the economic development, job creation and trade portfolio on June 20, 2019. The PCs had been slipping in the polls, partly due to spending cuts in Fedeli's April 2019 budget.

=== Parliamentary roles ===
- Member, Standing Committee on Finance and Economic Affairs
- PC lead, Standing Committee on Justice
- Critic, energy (October 26, 2011 – September 30, 2013)
- Critic, finance (September 10, 2013 – January 30, 2018)
- Leader of the Opposition in Ontario (January 26, 2018 – June 29, 2018)
- Minister of finance and chair of Cabinet (June 29, 2018 – June 20, 2019)
- Minister of economic development and chair of Cabinet (June 20, 2019 – present)

== Electoral record ==
=== Provincial electoral record ===
2025 Ontario general election: Nipissing
Party	Candidate	Votes	%	±%	Expenditures
Progressive Conservative	Vic Fedeli	17,356	54.83	+4.63	$87,784
New Democratic	Loren Mick	7,980	25.21	–3.05	$18,828
Liberal	Liam McGarry	3,996	12.62	–0.92	$0
Green	Colton Chaput	1,292	4.08	+0.74	$2,982
Libertarian	Michelle Lashbrook	536	1.69	+0.66	$0
Ontario Party	Scott Mooney	496	1.57	–0.44	$4,132
Total valid votes/expense limit		31,656	98.94	–0.28	$105,268
Total rejected, unmarked, and declined ballots		339	1.06	+0.28	
Turnout		31,995	49.78	+1.49	
Eligible voters		64,274			
Progressive Conservative hold		Swing		+3.84	
Source: Elections Ontario

2022 Ontario general election: Nipissing
Party	Candidate	Votes	%	±%	Expenditures
Progressive Conservative	Vic Fedeli	15,392	50.20	+0.27	$85,271
New Democratic	Erika Lougheed	8,665	28.26	−8.61	$35,083
Liberal	Tanya Vrebosch	4,150	13.54	+5.61	$34,803
Green	Sean McClocklin	1,025	3.34	+0.51	$5,786
Ontario Party	Joe Jobin	616	2.01		$0
New Blue	Taylor Russell	399	1.30		$0
Libertarian	Michelle Lashbrook	315	1.03	+0.68	$1,372
None of the Above	Giacomo Vezina	97	0.32		$0
Total valid votes/expense limit		30,659	99.22	+0.51	$90,300
Total rejected, unmarked, and declined ballots		241	0.78	-0.51	
Turnout		30,900	48.29	-9.95	
Eligible voters		64,453			
Progressive Conservative hold		Swing		+4.44	
Source(s): "Summary of Valid Votes Cast for Each Candidate" (PDF). Elections Ontario. 2022. Archived from the original on May 18, 2023.; "Statistical Summary by Electoral District" (PDF). Elections Ontario. 2022. Archived from the original on May 21, 2023.

2018 Ontario general election: Nipissing
Party	Candidate	Votes	%	±%
Progressive Conservative	Vic Fedeli	17,598	49.93	+8.12
New Democratic	Henri Giroux	12,994	36.87	+11.13
Liberal	Stephen Glass	2,794	7.93	-18.85
Green	Kris Rivard	997	2.83	-0.97
Northern Ontario	Trevor Holliday	738	2.09	
Libertarian	Bond Keevil	122	0.35	
Total valid votes		35,243	100.0	
Turnout			59.7	
Eligible voters		59,031		
Progressive Conservative hold		Swing		
Source: Elections Ontario

2014 Ontario general election
Party	Candidate	Votes	%	±%
Progressive Conservative	Vic Fedeli	13,085	41.81	−8.30
Liberal	Catherine Whiting	8,381	26.78	−1.81
New Democratic	Henri Giroux	8,055	25.74	+7.60
Green	Nicole Peltier	1,198	3.83	+0.67
Libertarian	Derek Elliott	365	1.17	+1.17
Independent	Patrick Clement	210	0.67	+0.67
Total valid votes		31,294	100.00	
Source: Elections Ontario

2011 Ontario general election
Party	Candidate	Votes	%	±%
Progressive Conservative	Vic Fedeli	15,380	50.11	+9.74
Liberal	Catherine Whiting	8,774	28.59	−13.35
New Democratic	Henri Giroux	5,567	18.14	+5.41
Green	Scott Haig	971	3.16	−0.68
Total valid votes		30,694	100.00	
Source: Elections Ontario

=== Municipal electoral record ===
North Bay mayoral election, 2006
Candidate	Votes	%
Vic Fedeli	12,168	67.20
Stan Lawlor	5,931	32.80

North Bay mayoral election, 2003
Candidate	Votes	%
Vic Fedeli	13,025	75.00
Lynne Bennett	3,147	18.12
Tim Wright	686	3.95
Jeff Marceau	508	2.93

=== Cabinet posts ===
Ford ministry, Province of Ontario (2018–present)
Cabinet posts (2)
Predecessor	Office	Successor
Todd Smith	Minister of Economic Development, Job Creation and Trade; June 20, 2019-present	Incumbent
Charles Sousa	Minister of Finance; June 29, 2018–June 20, 2019	Rod Phillips
Special Parliamentary Responsibilities
Predecessor	Title	Successor
Helena Jaczek	Chair of Cabinet; June 29, 2018-present	Incumbent
