= Papineau-Cameron =

- Township (single-tier)
- Township of Papineau-Cameron; Canton de Papineau-Cameron
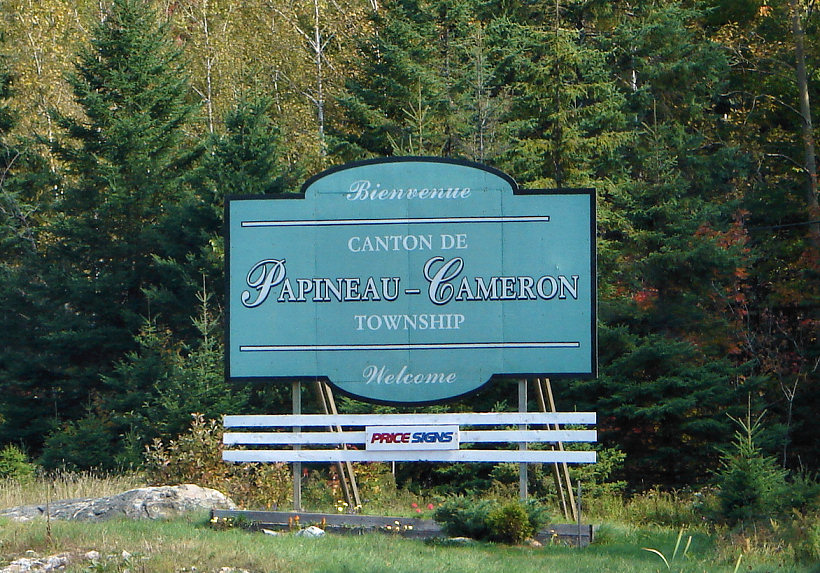

- Location within Ontario
- Coordinates: 46°18′N 78°44′W
- Country: Canada
- Province: Ontario
- District: Nipissing
- Founded: 1887

Government
  - Type: Township
  - Mayor: Robert Corriveau
  - Fed. riding: Nipissing—Timiskaming
  - Prov. riding: Nipissing

Area
  - Land: 564.23 km^{2} (217.85 sq mi)

Population (2021)
  - Total: 982
  - Density: 1.7/km^{2} (4.4/sq mi)
- Time zone: UTC-5 (EST)
  - Summer (DST): UTC-4 (EDT)
- Postal code: P0H 1V0
- Area codes: 705, 249
- Website: papineaucameron.ca

Papineau-Cameron is a township municipality in northeastern Ontario, Canada, in Nipissing District. The township is located on the south side of the Mattawa and Ottawa Rivers along Highway 17.

It is most known for its agricultural land, clean environment, pristine lakes, and trails.

== History ==
The Township of Papineau was named after speaker of the house in Lower Canadian Legislature (1815–1837), Louis-Joseph Papineau. While Cameron got its name from Chief Justice Sir Matthew Crooks Cameron, a senior government official.

The townships were first inhabited by natives. Non-native settlers started arriving in the 1830s. Many early immigrants were farmers and lumbermen, whose families would later join them. The Township of Papineau and the Township of Cameron were both incorporated in 1887. Cameron subsequently dropped its council, but was reincorporated as an Improvement District in 1944.

There was a mass migration of Finnish mineworkers to Cameron in 1912. They would settle there and farm the land, leading to further development of the community of Klock.

In 1992, the townships of Papineau and Cameron amalgamated, thus forming the municipal township of Papineau-Cameron.

In 2007, Papineau-Cameron, along with the town of Mattawa and the townships of Bonfield, Mattawan and Calvin cooperated to create a newly branded Mattawa Voyageur Country tourist region in order to promote the area.

== Communities ==
The township includes the communities of Klock, Morel, and Rankin.

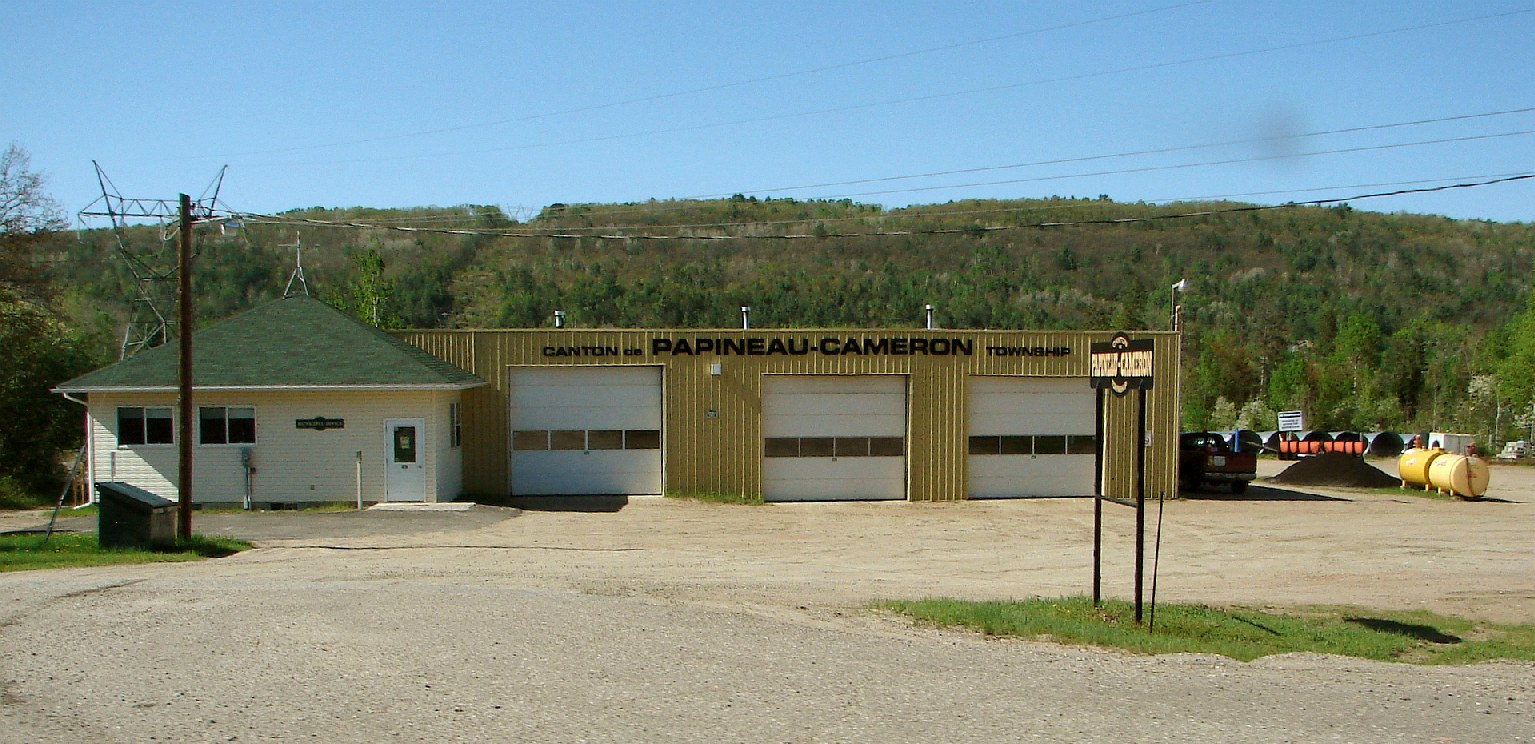
Municipal building of Papineau-Cameron

== Demographics ==
In the 2021 Census of Population conducted by Statistics Canada, Papineau-Cameron had a population of 982 living in 407 of its 495 total private dwellings, a change of −3.3% from its 2016 population of 1,016. With a land area of 564.23 km^{2} (217.85 sq mi), it had a population density of 1.7/km^{2} (4.5/sq mi) in 2021.

Canada census – Papineau-Cameron community profile

	2021	2016	2011
Population	982 (-3.3% from 2016)	1,016 (+3.9% from 2011)	978 (-7.6% from 2006)
Land area	564.23 km^{2} (217.85 sq mi)	566.39 km^{2} (218.68 sq mi)	566.74 km^{2} (218.82 sq mi)
Population density	1.7/km^{2} (4.4/sq mi)	1.8/km^{2} (4.7/sq mi)	1.7/km^{2} (4.4/sq mi)
Median age	52.4 (M: 53.6, F: 51.2)	50.6 (M: 51.4, F: 49.1)
Private dwellings	495 (total) 407 (occupied)	514 (total)	439 (total)
Median household income	$73,500	$59,264

References: 2021 2016 2011

Historical census populations – Papineau-Cameron

Year	Pop.	±%
1996	973	—
2001	997	+2.5%
2006	1,058	+6.1%

Year	Pop.	±%
2011	978	−7.6%
2016	1,016	+3.9%
2021	982	−3.3%

Source: Statistics Canada

Historical census populations – Cameron Improvement District

Year	Pop.	±%
1891	242	—
1901	386	+59.5%
1911	312	−19.2%
1921	312	+0.0%
1931	277	−11.2%

Year	Pop.	±%
1941	295	+6.5%
1951	268	−9.2%
1956	224	−16.4%
1961	185	−17.4%
1966	160	−13.5%

Year	Pop.	±%
1971	136	−15.0%
1976	139	+2.2%
1981	138	−0.7%
1986	148	+7.2%
1991	147	−0.7%

Source: Statistics Canada

Historical census populations – Papineau Township

Year	Pop.	±%
1881	205	—
1891	370	+80.5%
1901	670	+81.1%
1911	633	−5.5%
1921	606	−4.3%
1931	568	−6.3%

Year	Pop.	±%
1941	621	+9.3%
1951	724	+16.6%
1956	735	+1.5%
1961	716	−2.6%
1966	690	−3.6%
1971	652	−5.5%

Year	Pop.	±%
1976	658	+0.9%
1981	653	−0.8%
1986	691	+5.8%
1991	759	+9.8%

Source: Statistics Canada

== See also ==
- List of townships in Ontario
- List of francophone communities in Ontario
