= Calvin, Ontario =

Calvin
- Township (single-tier)
- Township of Calvin
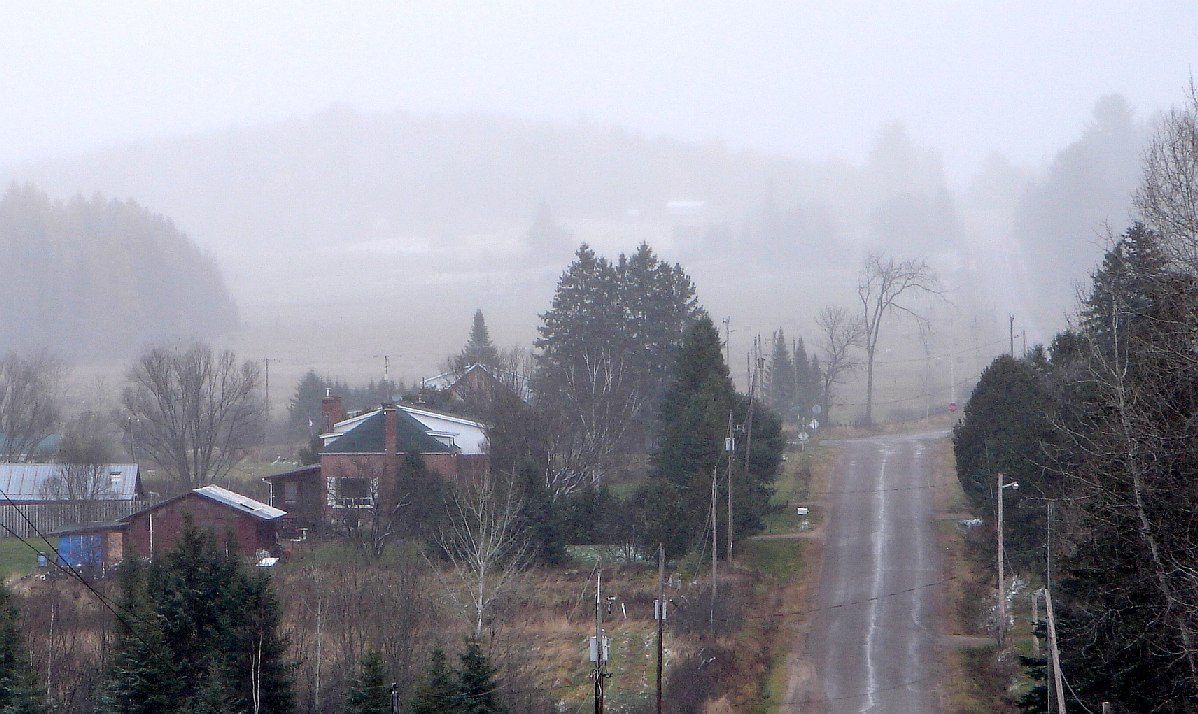

- Location within Ontario
- Coordinates: 46°14′N 78°56′W
- Country: Canada
- Province: Ontario
- District: Nipissing
- Settled: 1880s
- Incorporated: 1887

Government
  - Mayor: Richard Gould
  - Fed. riding: Nipissing—Timiskaming
  - Prov. riding: Nipissing

Area
  - Land: 140.13 km^{2} (54.10 sq mi)

Population (2021)
  - Total: 557
  - Density: 4/km^{2} (10/sq mi)
- Time zone: UTC-5 (Eastern (EST))
- Postal code: P0H 1V0
- Area code: 705
- Website: www.calvintownship.ca

Calvin is a township in northeastern Ontario, Canada, on the Mattawa River in Nipissing District. The township took its name from Delino Dexter Calvin, an Ontario lumber merchant and MPP based in Frontenac County.

Calvin is home to a part of the Samuel de Champlain Provincial Park, and provides access to Algonquin Provincial Park via Highway 630 (Kiosk Road).

In 2007, Calvin, along with the town of Mattawa and the townships of Papineau-Cameron, Mattawan and Bonfield cooperated to create a newly branded Mattawa Voyageur Country tourist region in order to promote the area.

== Communities ==
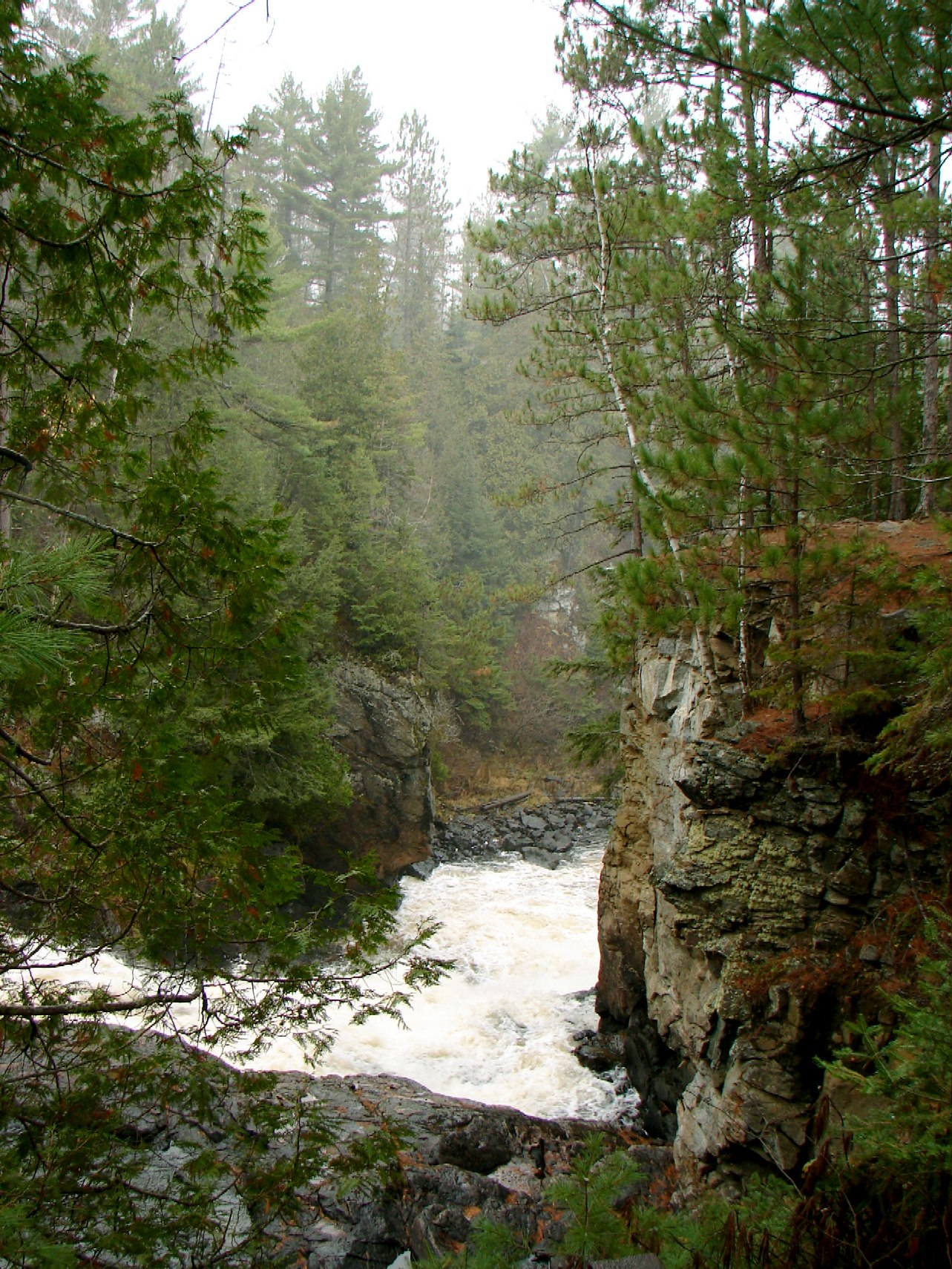
Eau Claire Gorge on the Amable du Fond River

The township comprises the communities of Eau Claire (46°14′56″N 78°53′24″W) and Eau Claire Station (46°16′25″N 78°55′06″W).

== History ==
In 1881, the township was surveyed and lots were made available for settlement. That same year, the Canada Central Railway reached the township from Mattawa. In 1887, it was incorporated.

== Demographics ==
In the 2021 Census of Population conducted by Statistics Canada, Calvin had a population of 557 living in 227 of its 263 total private dwellings, a change of 7.9% from its 2016 population of 516. With a land area of 140.13 km^{2} (54.10 sq mi), it had a population density of 4.0/km^{2} (10.3/sq mi) in 2021.

Canada census – Calvin community profile

	2021	2016	2011
Population	557 (+7.9% from 2016)	516 (-9.2% from 2011)	568 (-6.6% from 2006)
Land area	140.13 km^{2} (54.10 sq mi)	140.98 km^{2} (54.43 sq mi)	140.69 km^{2} (54.32 sq mi)
Population density	4.0/km^{2} (10/sq mi)	3.7/km^{2} (9.6/sq mi)	4.0/km^{2} (10/sq mi)
Median age	50.0 (M: 51.6, F: 47.2)	47.0 (M: 48.0, F: 45.0)
Private dwellings	263 (total) 227 (occupied)	251 (total)	251 (total)
Median household income	$72,000	$48,768

References: 2021 2016 2011

Historical census populations – Calvin, Ontario

Year	Pop.	±%
1881	111	—
1891	549	+394.6%
1901	509	−7.3%
1911	543	+6.7%
1921	496	−8.7%
1931	572	+15.3%
1941	555	−3.0%
1951	566	+2.0%

Year	Pop.	±%
1956	528	−6.7%
1961	513	−2.8%
1966	518	+1.0%
1971	500	−3.5%
1976	514	+2.8%
1981	523	+1.8%
1986	517	−1.1%
1991	575	+11.2%

Year	Pop.	±%
1996	562	−2.3%
2001	603	+7.3%
2006	608	+0.8%
2011	568	−6.6%
2016	516	−9.2%
2021	557	+7.9%

Source: Statistics Canada

== See also ==
- List of townships in Ontario
- List of francophone communities in Ontario
