= Chisholm, Ontario =

Chisholm
- Township (single-tier)
- Township of Chisholm
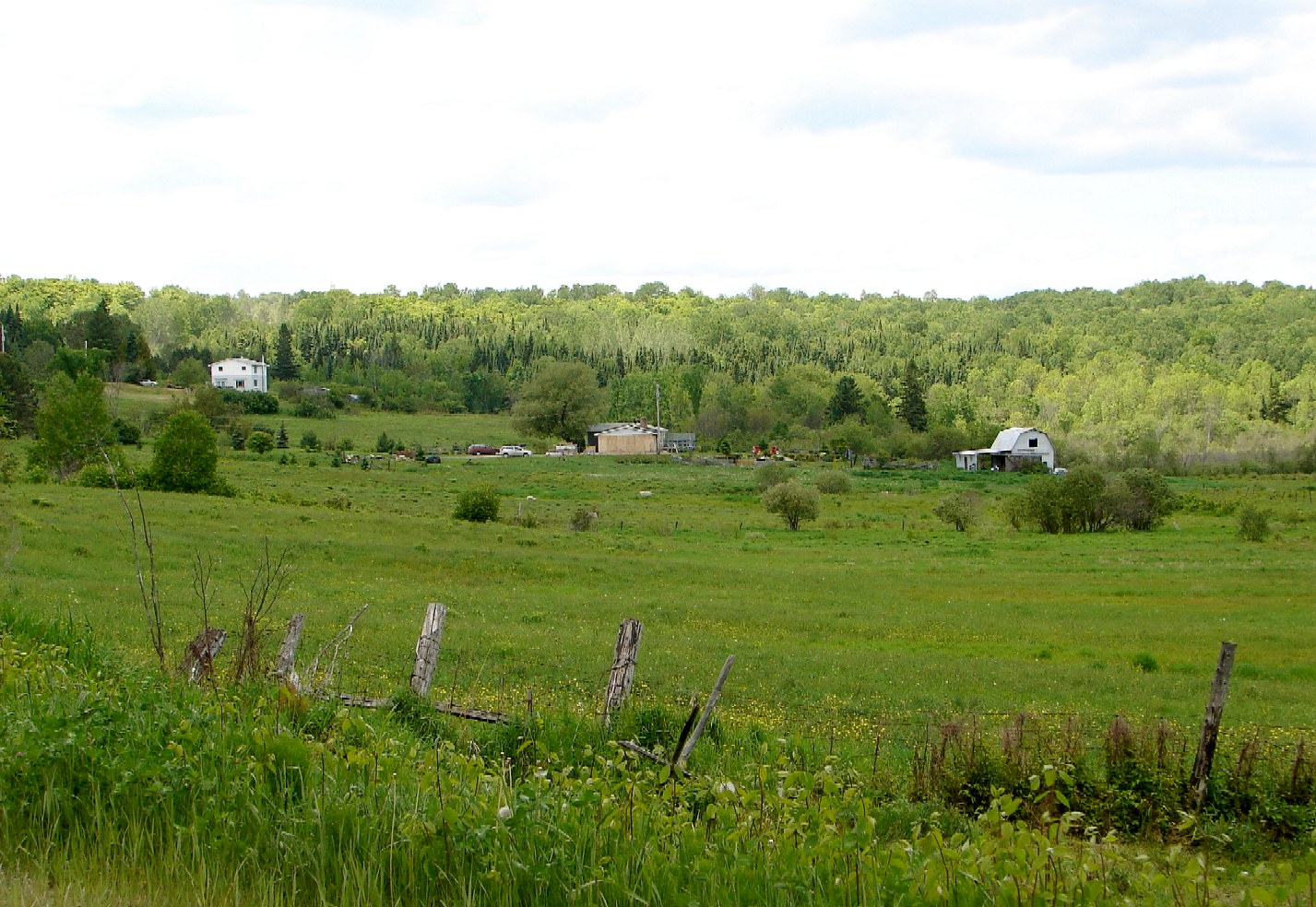

- Location within Ontario
- Coordinates: 46°06′N 79°14′W
- Country: Canada
- Province: Ontario
- District: Nipissing
- Settled: 1880s
- Incorporated: 1912
- Named for: Kenneth Chisholm

Government
  - Mayor: Gail Degagne
  - MP: Pauline Rochefort
  - MPP: Vic Fedeli

Area
  - Land: 205.77 km^{2} (79.45 sq mi)

Population (2021)
  - Total: 1,312
  - Density: 6.4/km^{2} (17/sq mi)
- Time zone: UTC-5 (EST)
  - Summer (DST): UTC-4 (EDT)
- Postal code: P0H 1Z0
- Area codes: 705, 249
- Website: www.chisholm.ca

Chisholm is a township in Northeastern Ontario, Canada, located in the Nipissing District.

== Geography ==
The township has a rectangular shape, 18 kilometres (11 mi) long by 13 kilometres (8.1 mi) wide, with gently undulating terrain that gradually rises from 85 metres (280 ft) in the north to 140 metres (450 ft) in the south.

It is situated on the height of land between the Great Lakes watershed and the Ottawa River watershed; the Wasi River flows west to Lake Nipissing, while the Depot Creek flows into Lake Nosbonsing and from there into the Mattawa and Ottawa Rivers.

=== Communities ===
Maps show the township as comprising the communities of Alderdale, Booth's Landing, Chiswick, Fossmill, Grahamvale and Wasing. However, these communities are now little more than slightly denser areas of housing, or completely abandoned in the case of Fossmill. The township administrative offices are located in Chiswick. Alderdale, Fossmill, Grahamvale, and Wasing were all once stops or milepoints along the Canadian National Railway Alderdale Subdivision. Rail service declined in the mid-20th century and was eliminated altogether in 1996.

== History ==
Circa 1860, logging began in the area and continued for some 50 years until all old-growth trees were clearcut. Afterwards, farming and sawmill operations were the main economic activity. In 1880, the township was surveyed, named after Kenneth Chisholm.

In 1912, the Township of Chisholm was incorporated. In 1915, the Canadian Northern Railway was built through the township, with stations at Fossmill, Alderdale, and Wasing. At Fossmill, a large sawmill was built that led to the rapid development of the community. Its fortunes reversed after a big fire in the lumber yard in 1934 and another one in 1936 that burned down the mill itself. It was not rebuilt, and Fossmill became a ghost town.

== Demographics ==
In the 2021 Census of Population conducted by Statistics Canada, Chisholm had a population of 1,312 living in 508 of its 614 total private dwellings, a change of 1.6% from its 2016 population of 1,291. With a land area of 205.77 km^{2} (79.45 sq mi), it had a population density of 6.4/km^{2} (16.5/sq mi) in 2021.

Historical census populations – Chisholm, Ontario

Year	Pop.	±%
1901	793	—
1911	1,051	+32.5%
1921	1,041	−1.0%
1931	1,404	+34.9%
1941	1,229	−12.5%
1951	872	−29.0%
1956	923	+5.8%

Year	Pop.	±%
1961	935	+1.3%
1966	827	−11.6%
1971	895	+8.2%
1976	1,008	+12.6%
1981	1,117	+10.8%
1986	1,154	+3.3%
1991	1,210	+4.9%

Year	Pop.	±%
1996	1,197	−1.1%
2001	1,230	+2.8%
2006	1,318	+7.2%
2011	1,263	−4.2%
2016	1,291	+2.2%
2021	1,312	+1.6%

Source: Statistics Canada

== See also ==
- List of townships in Ontario
- List of francophone communities in Ontario
