= Mattawan, Ontario =

Mattawan
- Municipality (single-tier)
- Municipality of Mattawan
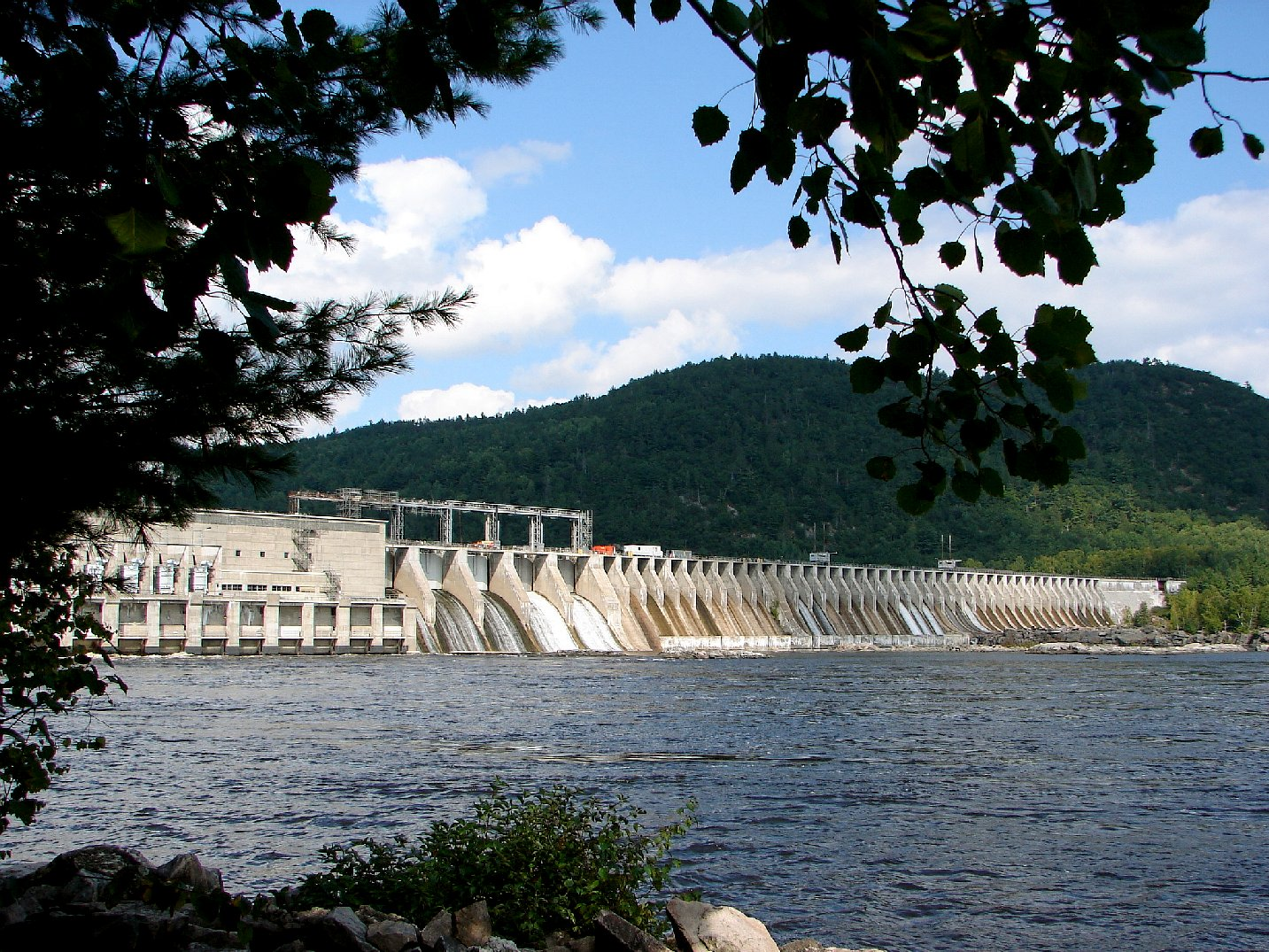
- The Otto Holden Generating Station and dam across the Ottawa River.

- Location within Ontario
- Coordinates: 46°20′N 78°50′W
- Country: Canada
- Province: Ontario
- District: Nipissing
- Settled: 1850s
- Incorporated: early 1880s

Government
  - Mayor: Peter Murphy

Area
  - Land: 200.12 km^{2} (77.27 sq mi)

Population (2021)
  - Total: 153
  - Density: 0.8/km^{2} (2.1/sq mi)
- Time zone: UTC-5 (Eastern (EST))
- Postal code: P0H 1V0
- Area codes: 705, 249
- Website: mattawan.ca

Mattawan is a municipality in the Canadian province of Ontario. Located in the Nipissing District, the municipality had a population of 153 in the 2021 Canadian census.

The municipality has no named communities within its boundaries; all addresses within the municipality are rural routes assigned to the neighbouring town of Mattawa.

Its main access road is Highway 533, with Highway 656 as a short branch leading to the Otto Holden Generating Station on the Ottawa River.

In 2007, Mattawan, along with the town of Mattawa and the townships of Papineau-Cameron, Bonfield and Calvin cooperated to create a newly branded Mattawa Voyageur Country tourist region in order to promote the area.

== History ==
European settlement began in the 1850s, when loggers came to clear the land, followed by farmers. The township was incorporated in the early 1880s.

In 1948, construction began on the Otto Holden Generating Station, leading to a temporary influx of immigrants.

In 1975, the Mount Antoine ski hill opened, which closed in 2000 and reopened again in 2015.

== Demographics ==
In the 2021 Census of Population conducted by Statistics Canada, Mattawan had a population of 153 living in 71 of its 102 total private dwellings, a change of −5% from its 2016 population of 161. With a land area of 200.12 km^{2} (77.27 sq mi), it had a population density of 0.8/km^{2} (2.0/sq mi) in 2021.

Canada census – Mattawan community profile

	2021	2016	2011
Population	153 (-5.0% from 2016)	161 (-0.6% from 2011)	162 (+10.2% from 2006)
Land area	200.12 km^{2} (77.27 sq mi)	201.00 km^{2} (77.61 sq mi)	200.96 km^{2} (77.59 sq mi)
Population density	0.8/km^{2} (2.1/sq mi)	0.8/km^{2} (2.1/sq mi)	0.8/km^{2} (2.1/sq mi)
Median age	53.2 (M: 53.2, F: 54.4)	53.9 (M: 55.4, F: 53.5)
Private dwellings	102 (total) 71 (occupied)	104 (total)	99 (total)
Median household income	$ n/a	$77,312

References: 2021 2016 2011

Historical census populations – Mattawan, Ontario

Year	Pop.	±%
1871	400	—
1881	325	−18.8%
1891	324	−0.3%
1901	328	+1.2%
1911	188	−42.7%
1921	198	+5.3%
1931	187	−5.6%
1941	113	−39.6%

Year	Pop.	±%
1951	692	+512.4%
1956	189	−72.7%
1961	105	−44.4%
1966	83	−21.0%
1971	82	−1.2%
1976	100	+22.0%
1981	102	+2.0%
1986	85	−16.7%

Year	Pop.	±%
1991	127	+49.4%
1996	115	−9.4%
2001	114	−0.9%
2006	147	+28.9%
2011	162	+10.2%
2016	161	−0.6%
2021	153	−5.0%

Source: Statistics Canada

Mother tongue (2021):

- English as first language: 67.7 %
- French as first language: 25.8 %
- English and French as first languages: 0 %
- Other as first language: 0 %

== See also ==
- List of townships in Ontario
- List of francophone communities in Ontario
