= Bonfield, Ontario =

Bonfield
- Township (single-tier)
- Township of Bonfield; Canton de Bonfield
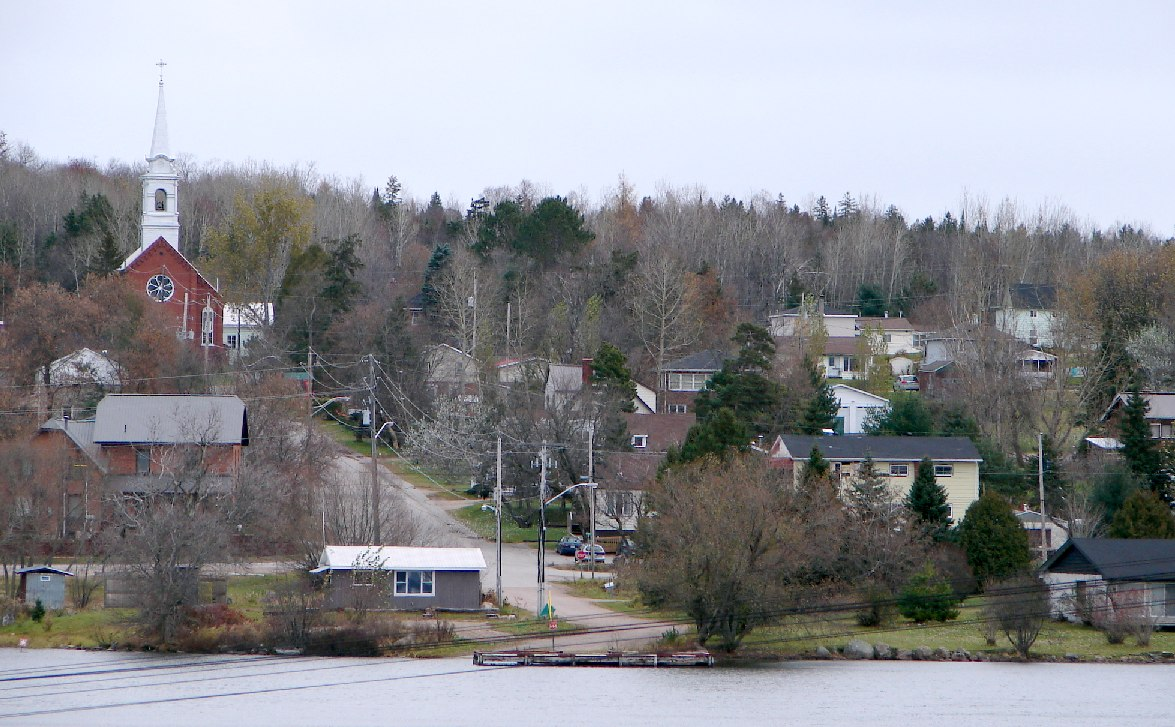

- Motto: "Small Community, Big Heart"
- Location within Ontario
- Coordinates: 46°13′N 79°8′W
- Country: Canada
- Province: Ontario
- District: Nipissing
- Established: 1882 as Callander Station
- Incorporated: 1886

Government
  - Mayor: Narry Paquette
  - MP: Pauline Rochefort
  - MPP: Vic Fedeli

Area
  - Land: 206.22 km^{2} (79.62 sq mi)

Population (2021)
  - Total: 2,146
  - Density: 10.4/km^{2} (27/sq mi)
- Time zone: UTC-5 (EST)
  - Summer (DST): UTC-4 (EDT)
- Postal code span: P0H 1E0, 2E0
- Area codes: 705, 249
- Website: www.bonfieldtownship.com

Bonfield is a township in northeastern Ontario, Canada, on the Mattawa River in Nipissing District.

Named after James Bonfield (1825-1900), one-time M.P.P for South Renfrew in the Ontario legislature. The township's primary economic activities are forestry, logging, tourism, and some farming.

In 2007, Bonfield, along with the town of Mattawa and the townships of Papineau-Cameron, Mattawan and Calvin cooperated to create a newly branded Mattawa Voyageur Country tourist region in order to promote the area.

== History ==
The community of Bonfield was first settled in 1882 as a station on the Canadian Pacific Railway.

Located on the north shore of Lake Nosbonsing, where the railway crosses the Kaibuskong River, this place was originally named by the CPR as Callander Station. The community of Callander, on the South-East Bay of Lake Nipissing, had been named Callander in 1880, to honour the birthplace in Scotland of Duncan McIntyre, then president of the Canada Central Railway (CCR). It was at this place on the shore of Lake Nipissing, that the CCR intended to connect with the proposed eastern terminus of the CPR. In 1881 the Canada Central Railway was merged into the Canadian Pacific, as McIntyre became its vice president. As construction of the railway approached Lake Nipissing from the east, it turned away from the South-East Bay, towards the North Bay of Lake Nipissing instead. This was the closest point the CPR would come to the village of Callander, therefore this place was named Callander Station.

After the Northern and Pacific Junction Railway established a station in the original village of Callander in 1886 and was taken over by the Grand Trunk Railway in 1888, there was much confusion between the station in Callander and Callander Station. The CPR location, Callander Station was renamed Bonfield, adopting the name of the township in which it is located.

1906, the village itself split off from the township and was separately incorporated as the Town of Bonfield. On January 1, 1975, the town and township were amalgamated.

== Communities ==
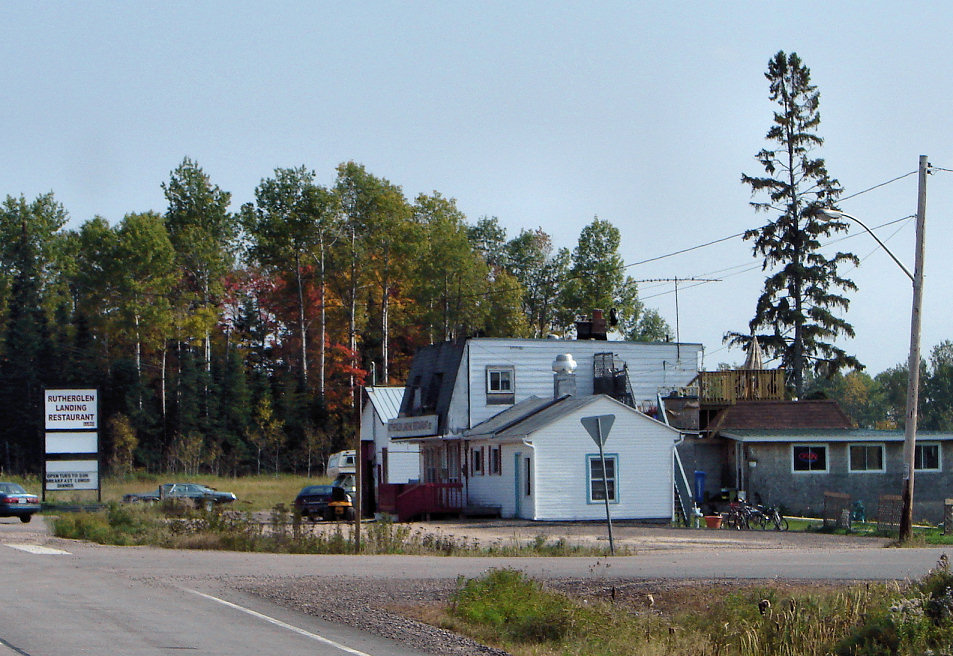
Rutherglen

The township comprises the communities of:

- Blanchard's Landing (on the boundary with Calvin, 46°17′00″N 79°01′39″W)
- Bonfield (46°13′56″N 79°8′43″W)
- Grand Desert (46°12′51″N 79°01′31″W)
- Rutherglen (46°16′14″N 79°02′10″W)

The community of Bonfield is connected to Highway 17 by Highway 531, while Rutherglen is located directly on the route of Highway 17 and the other communities are located on local roads within the township.

== Demographics ==
In the 2021 Census of Population conducted by Statistics Canada, Bonfield had a population of 2,146 living in 889 of its 1,080 total private dwellings, a change of 7.8% from its 2016 population of 1,990. With a land area of 206.22 km^{2} (79.62 sq mi), it had a population density of 10.4/km^{2} (27.0/sq mi) in 2021.

Canada census – Bonfield community profile

	2021	2016	2011
Population	2,146 (+7.8% from 2016)	1,990 (-1.3% from 2011)	2,016 (+1.8% from 2006)
Land area	206.22 km^{2} (79.62 sq mi)	208.38 km^{2} (80.46 sq mi)	208.43 km^{2} (80.48 sq mi)
Population density	10.4/km^{2} (27/sq mi)	9.5/km^{2} (25/sq mi)	9.7/km^{2} (25/sq mi)
Median age	48.0 (M: 48.8, F: 46.8)	48.9 (M: 49.0, F: 48.7)
Private dwellings	1,080 (total) 889 (occupied)	1,068 (total) 825 (occupied)	947 (total)
Median household income	$77,000	$67,285

Notes: 2016 population and dwelling counts based on revised count.
References: 2021 2016 2011

Historical census populations – Bonfield Township

Year	Pop.	±%
1881	360	—
1891	2,249	+524.7%
1901	1,304	−42.0%
1911	1,158	−11.2%
1921	1,267	+9.4%
1931	1,158	−8.6%
1941	1,132	−2.2%
1951	812	−28.3%

Year	Pop.	±%
1956	946	+16.5%
1961	997	+5.4%
1966	885	−11.2%
1971	966	+9.2%
1976	1,726	+78.7%
1981	1,704	−1.3%
1986	1,776	+4.2%
1991	1,937	+9.1%

Year	Pop.	±%
1996	1,765	−8.9%
2001	2,064	+16.9%
2006	1,981	−4.0%
2011	2,016	+1.8%
2016	1,990	−1.3%
2021	2,146	+7.8%

2006 and 2016 Population figures based on revised counts. Population counts are not adjusted for boundary changes.
Source: Statistics Canada

Historical census populations – Bonfield Town (1906-1975)

Year	Pop.	±%
1901	403	—
1911	484	+20.1%
1921	421	−13.0%
1931	493	+17.1%
1941	497	+0.8%

Year	Pop.	±%
1951	570	+14.7%
1956	609	+6.8%
1961	714	+17.2%
1966	577	−19.2%
1971	694	+20.3%

Source: Statistics Canada

== World Records ==
Bonfield is home to 'Jake' the cat with the most number of toes. Jake was born in 2002 and has 7 toes on each paw; with a total of 28.

== See also ==
- List of townships in Ontario
- List of francophone communities in Ontario
