= East Ferris =

- Township (single-tier)
- Township of East Ferris
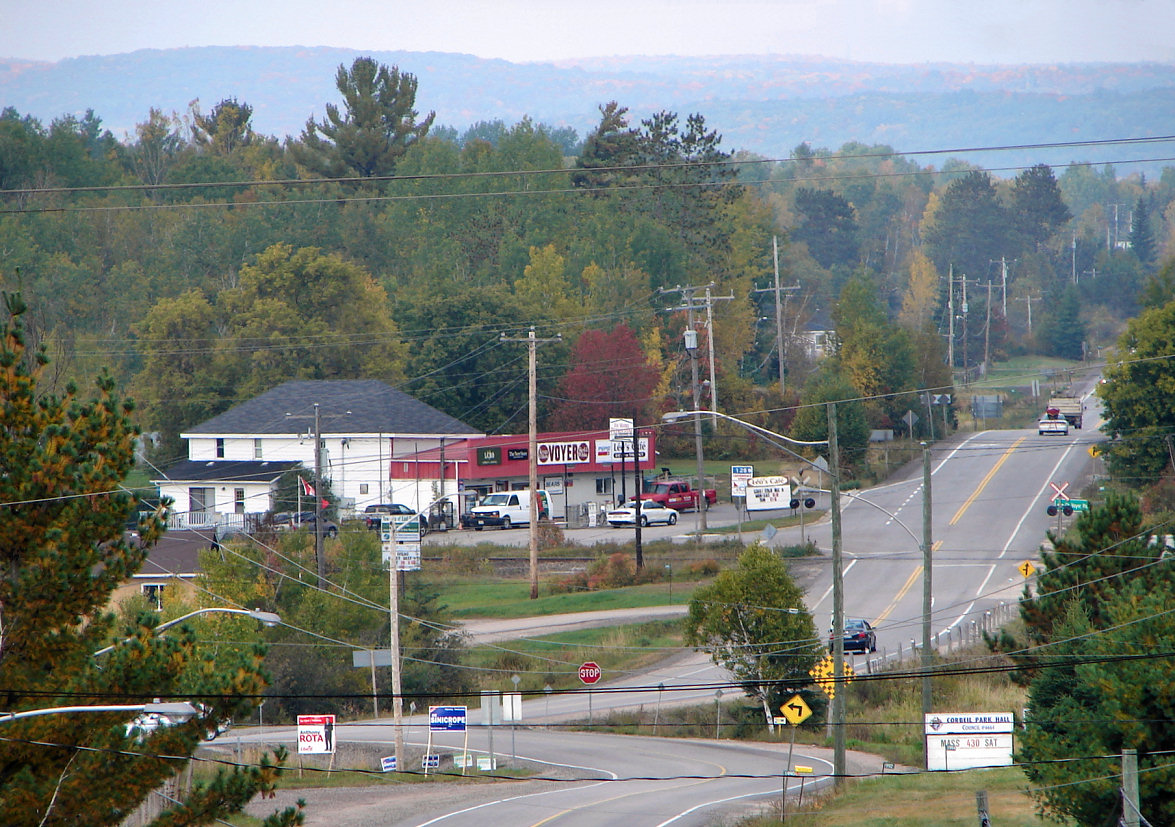
- Corbeil

- Location within Ontario
- Coordinates: 46°16′N 79°18′W
- Country: Canada
- Province: Ontario
- District: Nipissing
- Settled: 1885 (Astorville); 1897 (Corbeil)
- Incorporated: 1921

Government
  - Mayor: Rick Champagne
  - Governing Body: East Ferris Municipal Council
  - MP: Pauline Rochefort (L)
  - MPP: Vic Fedeli (PC)

Area
  - Total: 151.94 km^{2} (58.66 sq mi)

Population (2021)
  - Total: 4,946
  - Density: 32.6/km^{2} (84/sq mi)
- Time zone: UTC-5 (EST)
  - Summer (DST): UTC-4 (EDT)
- Postal Code: P0H 1B0 (Astorville); P0H 1K0 (Corbeil)
- Area codes: 705, 249
- Website: eastferris.ca

East Ferris is a township in northeastern Ontario, Canada, located between Trout Lake and Lake Nosbonsing in Nipissing District.

East Ferris was incorporated in 1921. West Ferris Township has been annexed into the city of North Bay since 1968.

== Communities ==
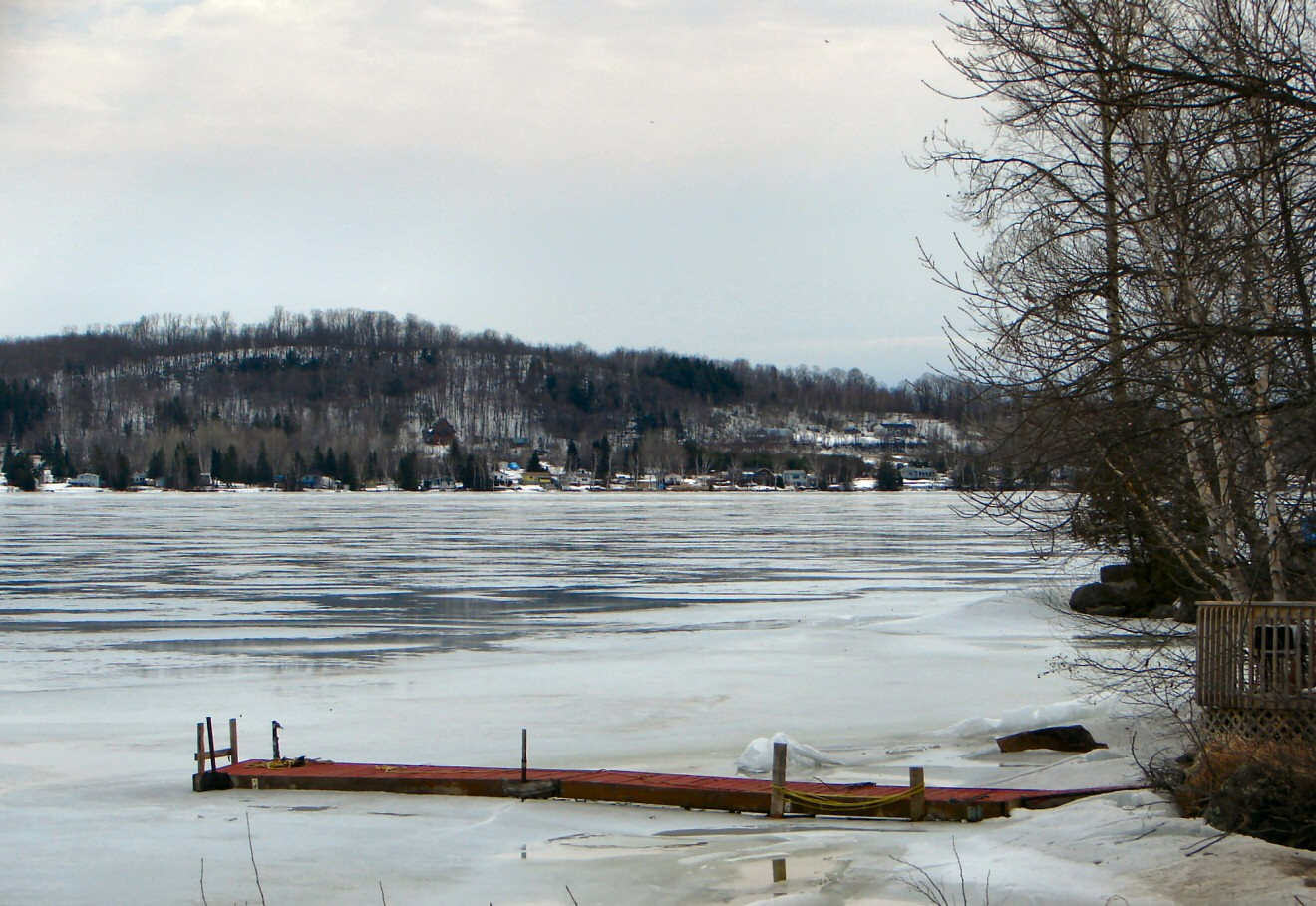
Astorville on Lake Nosbonsing

The main communities within East Ferris are Astorville and Corbeil. There are also smaller residential areas in the township, known as Derland Road and Lake Nosbonsing.

Astorville and Derland were formerly stops along the Canadian National Railway Alderdale Subdivision. Rail service declined in the mid-20th century and was eliminated altogether in 1996.

In July 2005, Astorville hosted the first Northern Ontario Ball Hockey Championship. In November 2005, Astorville was one of nine communities that voted on whether to accept private funding for a health centre.

Corbeil is located on the La Vase River, at a turn in Highway 94 south of its terminus at Highway 17. The township's municipal office and fire station is located in Corbeil on Highway 94 south of Voyer Road.

== Demographics ==
In the 2021 Census of Population conducted by Statistics Canada, East Ferris had a population of 4,946 living in 1,890 of its 2,172 total private dwellings, a change of 1.7% from its 2016 population of 4,862. With a land area of 151.94 km^{2} (58.66 sq mi), it had a population density of 32.6/km^{2} (84.3/sq mi) in 2021.

Canada census – East Ferris community profile

	2021	2016	2011
Population	4,946 (+1.7% from 2016)	4,862 (+2.0% from 2011)	4,766 (+12.7% from 2006)
Land area	151.94 km^{2} (58.66 sq mi)	155.17 km^{2} (59.91 sq mi)	155.03 km^{2} (59.86 sq mi)
Population density	32.6/km^{2} (84/sq mi)	30.6/km^{2} (79/sq mi)	30.7/km^{2} (80/sq mi)
Median age	48.0 (M: 47.6, F: 48.0)	47.8 (M: 47.8, F: 47.9)	46.4 (M: 46.1, F: 46.6)
Private dwellings	2,172 (total) 1,890 (occupied)	2,157 (total) 1,826 (occupied)	2,081 (total) 1,802 (occupied)
Median household income	$109,000	$92,199	$81,981

Notes: 2011 and 2016 Population and dwelling figures based on revised counts.
References: 2021 2016 2011

Historical census populations – East Ferris

Year	Pop.	±%
1951	1,046	—
1956	1,284	+22.8%
1961	1,808	+40.8%
1966	2,047	+13.2%
1971	2,483	+21.3%

Year	Pop.	±%
1976	3,148	+26.8%
1981	3,323	+5.6%
1986	3,440	+3.5%
1991	4,028	+17.1%
1996	4,139	+2.8%

Year	Pop.	±%
2001	4,291	+3.7%
2006	4,228	−1.5%
2011	4,766	+12.7%
2016	4,862	+2.0%
2021	4,946	+1.7%

2006, 2011, and 2016 Population figures based on revised counts.
Source: Statistics Canada

== Notable people ==
Canadian cartoonist Lynn Johnston lived and worked in Corbeil until she moved to North Vancouver in 2015.

The Dionne quintuplets were born on a farm near Corbeil. Corbeil was also the home of Marie-Louise Meilleur, a supercentenarian who was 117 years old when she died in 1998. She was the oldest living person in the world for the eight months preceding her death, and remains both the oldest verified person in Canadian history and the sixth oldest verified person in the world. She lived at the Nipissing Manor Nursing Home, which was once the mansion that housed the Dionne sisters.

== See also ==
- List of townships in Ontario
- List of francophone communities in Ontario
