= Nipissing District =

Nipissing District District de Nipissing
- District
- Location of Nipissing District in Ontario
- Coordinates: 46°18′00″N 79°27′00″W
- Country: Canada
- Province: Ontario
- Region: Northeastern Ontario
- Created: 1858

Government
  - MPs: Pauline Rochefort, Cheryl Gallant, Jim Belanger
  - MPPs: Vic Fedeli, John Vanthof, Billy Denault

Area
  - Land: 16,986.20 km^{2} (6,558.41 sq mi)

Population (2021)
  - Total: 84,716
  - Density: 5/km^{2} (13/sq mi)
- Time zone: UTC-5 (Eastern (EST))
  - Summer (DST): UTC-4 (EDT)
- Postal code FSA: P0A, P0B, P1A-P1C, P2B
- Area code: 705
- Seat: North Bay

Nipissing District is a district in Northeastern Ontario in the Canadian province of Ontario. It was created in 1858. The district seat is North Bay.

In 2021, the population was 84,716. The land area is 16,986.20 square kilometres (6,558.41 sq mi); the population density was 5.0 per square kilometre (13/sq mi), making it one of the most densely populated districts in northern Ontario.

== History ==
The Sudbury District was created in 1894 from townships of eastern Algoma District and west Nipissing District. The Timiskaming District was created in 1912 from parts of Algoma, Nipissing, and Sudbury Districts.

== Subdivisions ==
City:

- North Bay

Towns:

- Mattawa
- Temagami
- West Nipissing

In addition, the eastern part of the town of Kearney is within Nipissing District, but the entire town is enumerated with the Parry Sound District.

Townships:

- Bonfield
- Calvin
- Chisholm
- East Ferris
- Mattawan
- Papineau-Cameron
- South Algonquin

Unorganized areas:

- North Part (Local services boards in this unorganized areas include Redbridge, Thorne, and Tilden Lake)
- South Part

=== First Nation reserves ===
- Bear Island 1
- Nipissing 10

== Demographics ==
As a census division in the 2021 Census of Population conducted by Statistics Canada, the Nipissing District had a population of 84,716 living in 37,252 of its 41,974 total private dwellings, a change of 1.9% from its 2016 population of 83,150. With a land area of 16,986.2 km^{2} (6,558.4 sq mi), it had a population density of 5.0/km^{2} (12.9/sq mi) in 2021.

Canada census – Nipissing District community profile

	2021	2016	2011
Population	84,716 (+1.9% from 2016)	83,150 (-1.9% from 2011)	84,736 (0.1% from 2006)
Land area	16,986.20 km^{2} (6,558.41 sq mi)	17,103.78 km^{2} (6,603.81 sq mi)	17,103.52 km^{2} (6,603.71 sq mi)
Population density	5.0/km^{2} (13/sq mi)	4.9/km^{2} (13/sq mi)	5.0/km^{2} (13/sq mi)
Median age	46.8 (M: 45.6, F: 48)	45.9 (M: 44.9, F: 46.8)
Private dwellings	41,974 (total) 37,252 (occupied)	41,200 (total) 36,050 (occupied)	41,023 (total)
Median household income	$72,500	$60,303

Notes: Excludes census data for one or more incompletely enumerated Indian reserves.
References: 2021 2016 2011

Historical census populations – Nipissing District

Year	Pop.	±%
1921	34,541	—
1931	41,207	+19.3%
1941	43,315	+5.1%
1951	50,517	+16.6%
1956	60,452	+19.7%
1961	70,568	+16.7%

Year	Pop.	±%
1966	73,533	+4.2%
1971	78,867	+7.3%
1976	81,739	+3.6%
1981	80,268	−1.8%
1986	79,004	−1.6%
1991	84,723	+7.2%

Year	Pop.	±%
1996	84,832	+0.1%
2001	82,910	−2.3%
2006	84,688	+2.1%
2011	84,736	+0.1%
2016	83,150	−1.9%
2021	84,716	+1.9%

2011, 2006, and 2001 excludes census data for one or more incompletely enumerated Indian reserves or Indian settlements. Population counts are not adjusted for boundary changes.
Source: Statistics Canada

== See also ==
- Census divisions of Ontario
- List of townships in Ontario
- List of secondary schools in Ontario#Nipissing District
