= 24th Parliament of Ontario =

The 24th Legislative Assembly of Ontario was in session from November 22, 1951, until May 2, 1955, just prior to the 1955 general election. The majority party was the Ontario Progressive Conservative Party led by Leslie Frost.

M.C. Davies served as speaker for the assembly.

== Members of the Assembly ==
Riding	Member	Party	First elected / previously elected	No. of terms
Addington	John Abbott Pringle	Progressive Conservative	1943	4th term
Algoma—Manitoulin	John Arthur Fullerton	Progressive Conservative	1945	3rd term
Beaches	William Henry Collings	Progressive Conservative	1951	1st term
Bellwoods	John Yaremko	Progressive Conservative	1951	1st term
Bracondale	Arthur George Frost	Progressive Conservative	1951	1st term
Brant	Harry Corwin Nixon	Liberal	1919	10th term
Brantford	George Thomas Gordon	Liberal	1948	2nd term
Bruce	John Philemon Johnstone	Progressive Conservative	1945, 1951	2nd term*
Carleton	Donald Hugo Morrow	Progressive Conservative	1948	2nd term
Cochrane North	Philip Kelly	Progressive Conservative	1951	1st term
Cochrane South	Bill Grummett	Co-operative Commonwealth	1943	4th term
Dovercourt	David Kerr	Progressive Conservative	1951	1st term
Dufferin—Simcoe	Alfred Wallace Downer	Progressive Conservative	1937	5th term
Durham	John Weir Foote	Progressive Conservative	1948	2nd term
Eglinton	William James Dunlop	Progressive Conservative	1951	1st term
Elgin	Fletcher Stewart Thomas	Progressive Conservative	1945	3rd term
Essex North	Arthur John Reaume	Liberal	1951	1st term
Essex South	William Murdoch	Progressive Conservative	1943	4th term
Fort William	Clare Edgar Mapledoram	Progressive Conservative	1951	1st term
Glengarry	Osie Villeneuve	Progressive Conservative	1948	2nd term
Grenville—Dundas	George Holmes Challies	Progressive Conservative	1929	7th term
Grey North	Mackinnon Phillips	Progressive Conservative	1945	3rd term
Grey South	Farquhar Robert Oliver	Liberal	1926 (Note: First elected as United Farmers)	8th term
Haldimand—Norfolk	James Noble Allan	Progressive Conservative	1951	1st term
Halton	Stanley Leroy Hall	Progressive Conservative	1943	4th term
Hamilton Centre	William Kenneth Warrender	Progressive Conservative	1951	1st term
Hamilton East	Robert Ellsworth Elliott	Progressive Conservative	1945, 1951	2nd term*
Hamilton—Wentworth	Thomas Ray Connell	Progressive Conservative	1951	1st term
Hastings East	Roscoe Robson	Progressive Conservative	1943	4th term
Hastings West	Elmer Sandercock	Progressive Conservative	1948	2nd term
High Park	Alfred Hozack Cowling	Progressive Conservative	1951	1st term
Huron	Thomas Pryde	Progressive Conservative	1948	3rd term
Huron—Bruce	John William Hanna	Progressive Conservative	1943	4th term
Kenora	Albert Wren	Liberal-Labour	1951	1st term
Kent East	Andrew Thomas Ward	Progressive Conservative	1951	1st term
Kent West	George William Parry	Progressive Conservative	1945	3rd term
Kingston	William McAdam Nickle	Progressive Conservative	1951	1st term
Lambton East	Charles Eusibius Janes	Progressive Conservative	1945	3rd term
Lambton West	Bryan Lewis Cathcart	Progressive Conservative	1945	3rd term
Lanark	George Henry Doucett	Progressive Conservative	1937	5th term
Leeds	Charles Gordon MacOdrum	Progressive Conservative	1951	1st term
Leeds	James Auld (1954)	Progressive Conservative	1954	1st term
Lincoln	Charles Daley	Progressive Conservative	1943	4th term
London	John Parmenter Robarts	Progressive Conservative	1951	1st term
Middlesex North	Thomas L. Patrick	Progressive Conservative	1943	4th term
Middlesex South	Harry Marshall Allen	Progressive Conservative	1945	3rd term
Muskoka—Ontario	George Arthur Welsh	Progressive Conservative	1945	3rd term
Niagara Falls	William Houck (Note: elected to federal seat)	Liberal	1934, 1948	4th term*
Niagara Falls	Arthur Connaught Jolley (1953)	Progressive Conservative	1953	1st term
Nipissing	William Bruce Harvey	Progressive Conservative	1948	2nd term
Nipissing	Jean Marc Chaput (1954)	Progressive Conservative	1954	1st term
Northumberland	William Arthur Goodfellow	Progressive Conservative	1943	4th term
Ontario	T.D. Thomas	Co-operative Commonwealth	1948	2nd term
Ottawa East	Aurele Chartrand	Liberal	1948	2nd term
Ottawa South	George Harrison Dunbar	Progressive Conservative	1937	5th term
Oxford	Thomas Roy Dent	Progressive Conservative	1943	4th term
Parkdale	William James Stewart	Progressive Conservative	1938, 1951	4th term*
Parry Sound	Allister Johnston	Progressive Conservative	1948	2nd term
Peel	Thomas Laird Kennedy	Progressive Conservative	1919, 1937	9th term*
Perth	James Frederick Edwards	Progressive Conservative	1945	3rd term
Peterborough	Harold Robinson Scott	Progressive Conservative	1943	4th term
Port Arthur	George Calvin Wardrope	Progressive Conservative	1951	1st term
Prescott	Louis-Pierre Cécile	Progressive Conservative	1948	2nd term
Prince Edward—Lennox	Norris Eldon Howe Whitney	Progressive Conservative	1951	1st term
Rainy River	William George Noden	Progressive Conservative	1951	1st term
Renfrew North	Stanley Joseph Hunt	Progressive Conservative	1943	4th term
Renfrew South	James Shannon Dempsey	Progressive Conservative	1945	3rd term
Riverdale	Robert William Macaulay	Progressive Conservative	1951	1st term
Russell	Joseph Daniel Nault (Note: died in 1954)	Progressive Conservative	1948	2nd term
Russell	Gordon Lavergne (1954)	Progressive Conservative	1954	1st term
Sault Ste. Marie	Harry Lyons	Progressive Conservative	1951	1st term
Simcoe Centre	George Graham Johnston	Progressive Conservative	1943	4th term
Simcoe East	John Duncan McPhee	Progressive Conservative	1943	4th term
Simcoe East	Lloyd Averall Letherby (1954)	Progressive Conservative	1954	1st term
St. Andrew	Joseph Baruch Salsberg	Labour-Progressive	1943	4th term
St. David	Everett Weaver	Progressive Conservative	1951	1st term
St. George	Dana Harris Porter	Progressive Conservative	1943	4th term
St. Patrick	Archibald Kelso Roberts	Progressive Conservative	1943, 1951	3rd term*
Stormont	Peter Thomas Manley	Liberal	1951	1st term
Sudbury	Welland Stewart Gemmell	Progressive Conservative	1948	2nd term
Timiskaming	Alexander Robert Herbert	Progressive Conservative	1951	1st term
Victoria	Leslie Miscampbell Frost	Progressive Conservative	1937	5th term
Waterloo North	Stanley Francis Leavine	Progressive Conservative	1951	1st term
Waterloo South	Raymond Munro Myers	Progressive Conservative	1951	1st term
Welland	Ellis Price Morningstar	Progressive Conservative	1951	1st term
Wellington North	John Henry Haines Root	Progressive Conservative	1951	1st term
Wellington South	William Ernest Hamilton	Progressive Conservative	1945	3rd term
Wentworth	Arthur John Child	Progressive Conservative	1951	1st term
Windsor—Sandwich	William Griesinger	Progressive Conservative	1945	3rd term
Windsor—Walkerville	M.C. Davies	Progressive Conservative	1945	3rd term
Woodbine	Harold Ferguson Fishleigh	Progressive Conservative	1951	1st term
York East	Hollis Edward Beckett	Progressive Conservative	1951	1st term
York North	Addison Alexander MacKenzie	Progressive Conservative	1945	3rd term
York South	William George Beech	Progressive Conservative	1951	1st term
York West	W. Elmer Brandon	Progressive Conservative	1951	1st term

== Timeline ==
24th Legislative Assembly of Ontario - Movement in seats held (1951–1955)
Party	1951	Gain/(loss) due to				1955
Party	1951	Resignation as MPP	Death in office	Byelection gain	Byelection hold	1955
Progressive Conservative	79		(4)	1	4	80
Liberal	7	(1)				6
Co-operative Commonwealth	2					2
Labor–Progressive	1					1
Liberal–Labour	1					1
Total	90	(1)	(4)	1	4	90

Changes in seats held (1951–1955)
Seat	Before				Change		
Seat	Date	Member	Party	Reason	Date	Member	Party
Niagara Falls	July 22, 1953	William Houck	█ Liberal	Chose to stand in Niagara Falls in the 1953 federal election	October 26, 1953	Arthur Connaught Jolley	█ PC
Simcoe East	December 2, 1953	John Duncan McPhee	█ PC	Died in office	February 8, 1954	Lloyd Letherby	█ PC
Nipissing	March 1, 1954	William Bruce Harvey	█ PC	Died in office	September 16, 1954	Jean Marc Chaput	█ PC
Leeds	March 15, 1954	Charles MacOdrum	█ PC	Died in office	September 16, 1954	James Auld	█ PC
Russell	March 18, 1954	Joseph Daniel Nault	█ PC	Died in office	September 16, 1954	Gordon Lavergne	█ PC
