= Nipissing (provincial electoral district) =

Provincial electoral district in Ontario, Canada

Coordinates: 46.19°N 79.14°W

Ontario electoral district
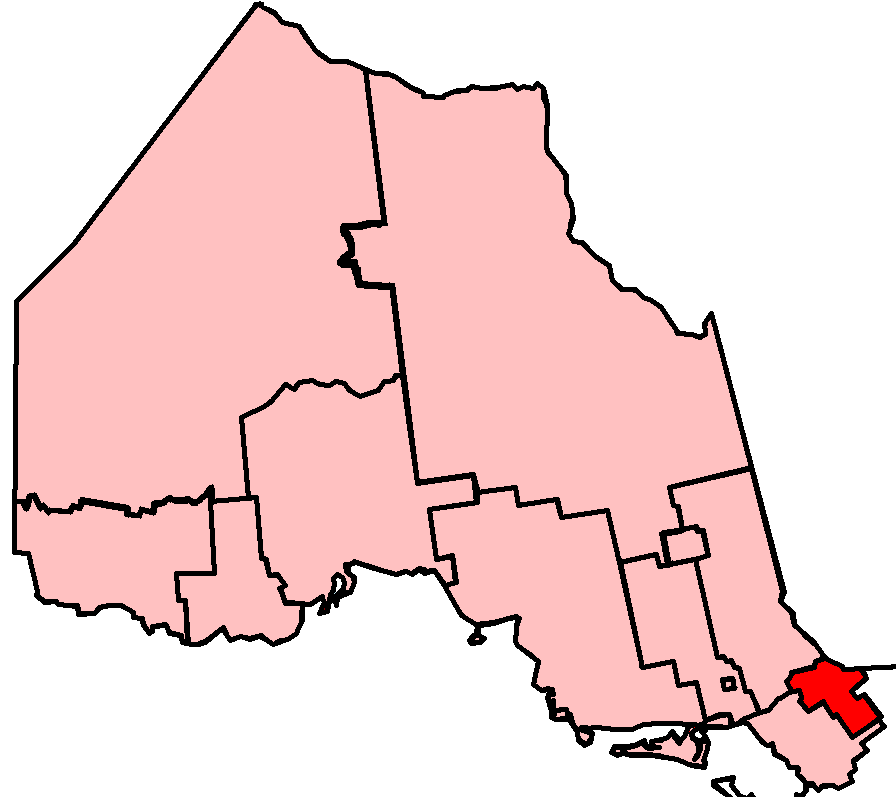
- Nipissing in relation to other electoral districts

Provincial electoral district
- Legislature: Legislative Assembly of Ontario
MPP
Vic Fedeli
Progressive Conservative
- District created: 1890
- First contested: 1890
- Last contested: 2025

Demographics
- Population (2016): 75,060
- Electors (2018): 61,299
- Area (km²): 8,121
- Pop. density (per km²): 9.2
- Census division(s): Nipissing, Parry Sound

Nipissing is a provincial electoral district in Ontario, Canada, which elects one member to the Legislative Assembly of Ontario. It is located in the northeastern part of Ontario, centred on the city of North Bay.

== History ==
The district was first contested in the 1890 election, but was divided into the separate districts of Nipissing East and Nipissing West for the 1902 election. By 1908, however, demographic changes resulted in Nipissing West being divided into two new districts, Sudbury and Sturgeon Falls, and the single riding of Nipissing was thus reconstituted and has been represented consistently in the Legislative Assembly ever since.

In 1996, Ontario was divided into the same electoral districts as those used for federal electoral purposes. They were redistributed whenever a readjustment took place at the federal level.

In 2005, legislation was passed by the Legislature to divide Ontario into 107 electoral districts, beginning with the provincial election in 2007. The eleven northern electoral districts are those defined for federal purposes in 1996, based on the 1991 census (except for a minor boundary adjustment). The 96 southern electoral districts are those defined for federal electoral purposes in 2003, based on the 2001 census. Without this legislation, the number of electoral districts in northern Ontario would have been reduced from eleven to ten.

In 1996, it was defined to consist of parts of the eastern part of territorial district of Parry Sound, and the western part of the Territorial District of Nipissing.

The federal electoral district was abolished in 2003 when it was merged into Nipissing—Timiskaming riding.

== Members of Provincial Parliament ==
Nipissing
Assembly	Years	Member	Party
Riding created
7th	1890–1894	John Loughrin	Liberal
8th	1894–1898	John Loughrin	Liberal
9th	1898–1902	John Loughrin	Liberal
Riding split into Nipissing East and Nipissing West from 1902 to 1908
Nipissing West split into Sudbury and Sturgeon Falls — Nipissing restored
12th	1908–1911	Henri Morel	Conservative
13th	1911–1914	Henri Morel	Conservative
14th	1914–1919	Henri Morel	Conservative
15th	1919–1923	Joseph Marceau	Liberal
16th	1923–1926	Henri Morel	Conservative
17th	1926–1929	Henri Morel	Conservative
18th	1929–1930	Henri Morel	Conservative
18th	1930–1934	Charles Robert Harrison	Conservative
19th	1934–1935	Théodore Legault	Liberal
19th	1935–1937	Joseph Marceau	Liberal
20th	1937–1943	Joseph Élie Cholette	Liberal
21st	1943–1945	Arthur Allen Casselman	Co-operative Commonwealth
22nd	1945–1948	Victor Martin	Liberal
23rd	1948–1951	William Bruce Harvey	Progressive Conservative
24th	1951–1954	William Bruce Harvey	Progressive Conservative
24th	1954–1955	Jean Marc Chaput	Progressive Conservative
25th	1955–1959	Jean Marc Chaput	Progressive Conservative
26th	1959–1963	Leo Troy	Liberal
27th	1963–1965	Leo Troy	Liberal
27th	1965–1967	Richard Smith	Liberal
28th	1967–1971	Richard Smith	Liberal
29th	1971–1975	Richard Smith	Liberal
30th	1975–1977	Richard Smith	Liberal
31st	1977–1981	Mike Bolan	Liberal
32nd	1981–1985	Mike Harris	Progressive Conservative
33rd	1985–1987	Mike Harris	Progressive Conservative
34th	1987–1990	Mike Harris	Progressive Conservative
35th	1990–1995	Mike Harris	Progressive Conservative
36th	1995–1999	Mike Harris	Progressive Conservative
37th	1999–2002	Mike Harris	Progressive Conservative
37th	2002–2003	Al McDonald	Progressive Conservative
38th	2003–2007	Monique Smith	Liberal
39th	2007–2011	Monique Smith	Liberal
40th	2011–2014	Vic Fedeli	Progressive Conservative
41st	2014–2018	Vic Fedeli	Progressive Conservative
42nd	2018–2022	Vic Fedeli	Progressive Conservative
43rd	2022–2025	Vic Fedeli	Progressive Conservative
44th	2025–present	Vic Fedeli	Progressive Conservative

== Election results ==
Winning party in each polling division of Nipissing at the 2025 Ontario general election

2025 Ontario general election
Party	Candidate	Votes	%	±%	Expenditures
Progressive Conservative	Vic Fedeli	17,356	54.83	+4.62	$87,784
New Democratic	Loren Mick	7,980	25.21	–3.05	$18,828
Liberal	Liam McGarry	3,996	12.62	–0.91	$0
Green	Colton Chaput	1,292	4.08	+0.74	$2,982
Libertarian	Michelle Lashbrook	536	1.69	+0.67	$0
Ontario Party	Scott Mooney	496	1.57	–0.44	$4,132
Total valid votes/expense limit		31,656	98.94	–	$105,268
Total rejected, unmarked and declined ballots		339	1.06	+0.28	
Turnout		31,995	48.93	+0.65	
Eligible voters		65,384			
Progressive Conservative hold		Swing		+3.84	
Source: Elections Ontario

Winning party in each polling division of Nipissing at the 2022 Ontario general election

2022 Ontario general election
Party	Candidate	Votes	%	±%	Expenditures
Progressive Conservative	Vic Fedeli	15,392	50.20	+0.27	$85,271
New Democratic	Erika Lougheed	8,665	28.26	–8.61	$35,083
Liberal	Tanya Vrebosch	4,150	13.54	+5.61	$34,803
Green	Sean McClocklin	1,025	3.34	+0.51	$5,786
Ontario Party	Joe Jobin	616	2.01	–	$0
New Blue	Taylor Russell	399	1.30	–	$0
Libertarian	Michelle Lashbrook	315	1.03	+0.68	$1,372
None of the Above	Giacomo Vezina	97	0.32	–	$0
Total valid votes/expense limit		30,659	99.22	–	$90,300
Total rejected, unmarked and declined ballots		241	0.78	–0.51	
Turnout		30,900	48.29	–9.96	
Eligible voters		63,993			
Progressive Conservative hold		Swing		+4.44	
Source: Elections Ontario

2018 Ontario general election
Party	Candidate	Votes	%	±%	Expenditures
Progressive Conservative	Vic Fedeli	17,598	49.93	+8.12	$86,752
New Democratic	Henri Giroux	12,994	36.87	+11.13	$24,276
Liberal	Stephen Glass	2,794	7.93	–18.85	$31,188
Green	Kris Rivard	997	2.83	–0.97	$81
Northern Ontario	Trevor Holliday	738	2.09	–	$31
Libertarian	Bond Keevil	122	0.35	–0.86	none listed
Total valid votes/expense limit		35,243	98.71		
Total rejected, unmarked and declined ballots		460	1.29	–0.02	
Turnout		35,703	58.24	+5.76	
Eligible voters		61,299			
Progressive Conservative hold		Swing		–1.50	
Source: Elections Ontario

2014 Ontario general election
Party	Candidate	Votes	%	±%	Expenditures
Progressive Conservative	Vic Fedeli	13,085	41.81	–8.30	$68,985.53
Liberal	Catherine Whiting	8,382	26.78	–1.81	$19,619.56
New Democratic	Henri Giroux	8,057	25.74	+7.61	$25,285.23
Green	Nicole L. Peltier	1,188	3.80	+0.63	$227.04
Libertarian	Derek Elliott	377	1.20	–	$0
Independent	Patrick Clement	208	0.66	–	$14.45
Total valid votes/expense limit		31,297	98.69	–	$77,340.16
Total rejected, unmarked and declined ballots		416	1.31	+0.82	
Turnout		31,713	52.49	+0.63	
Eligible voters		60,422			
Progressive Conservative hold		Swing		–3.25	
Source: Elections Ontario

2011 Ontario general election
Party	Candidate	Votes	%	±%
Progressive Conservative	Vic Fedeli	15,381	50.11	+9.40
Liberal	Catherine Whiting	8,775	28.59	–13.52
New Democratic	Henri Giroux	5,567	18.14	+5.50
Green	Scott Haig	971	3.16	–0.65
Total valid votes		30,694	99.51	
Total rejected, unmarked and declined ballots		152	0.49	–0.11
Turnout		30,846	51.86	–4.93
Eligible voters		59,481		
Progressive Conservative gain from Liberal		Swing		+11.46
Source: Elections Ontario

2007 Ontario general election
Party	Candidate	Votes	%	±%
Liberal	Monique Smith	13,781	42.11	–7.73
Progressive Conservative	Bill Vrebosch	13,323	40.71	–0.75
New Democratic	Henri Giroux	4,136	12.64	+5.40
Green	Amy Brownridge	1,248	3.81	+2.35
Family Coalition	Suzanne Plouffe	238	0.73	–
Total valid votes		32,726	99.40	
Total rejected, unmarked and declined ballots		199	0.60	+0.13
Turnout		32,925	56.79	–5.81
Eligible voters		57,974		
Liberal hold		Swing		–3.49
Source: Elections Ontario

2003 Ontario general election
Party	Candidate	Votes	%	±%
Liberal	Monique Smith	18,003	49.84	+4.36
Progressive Conservative	Al McDonald	14,978	41.47	–4.07
New Democratic	Terry O'Connor	2,613	7.23	+1.31
Green	Jaimie Board	528	1.46	–1.60
Total valid votes		36,122	99.52	
Total rejected, unmarked and declined ballots		173	0.48	+0.03
Turnout		36,295	62.60	+8.21
Eligible voters		57,981		
Liberal gain from Progressive Conservative		Swing		+4.22
Source: Elections Ontario

Ontario provincial by-election, May 2, 2002 Resignation of Mike Harris
Party	Candidate	Votes	%	±%
Progressive Conservative	Al McDonald	13,989	45.54	–4.88
Liberal	George Maroosis	13,970	45.48	+2.34
New Democratic	Wendy Young	1,821	5.93	+1.07
Green	Todd Lucier	940	3.06	+2.11
Total valid votes		30,720	99.55	
Total rejected, unmarked and declined ballots		139	0.45	–0.17
Turnout		30,859	54.39	–10.42
Eligible voters		56,740		
Progressive Conservative hold		Swing		–3.61
Source: Elections Ontario

1999 Ontario general election
Party	Candidate	Votes	%	±%
Progressive Conservative	Mike Harris	19,498	50.42	–10.06
Liberal	George Maroosis	16,682	43.14	+17.67
New Democratic	Wendy Young	1,878	4.86	–9.20
Green	Jaimie Board	366	0.95	–
Natural Law	Michaele Morris	246	0.64	–
Total valid votes		38,670	99.38	
Total rejected, unmarked and declined ballots		241	0.62	–0.21
Turnout		38,911	64.81	+1.13
Eligible voters		60,043		
Progressive Conservative hold		Swing		–13.86
Source: Elections Ontario

1995 Ontario general election
Party	Candidate	Votes	%	±%
Progressive Conservative	Mike Harris	18,722	60.48	+14.63
Liberal	Bert Brandon	7,885	25.47	–6.37
New Democratic	Doug Bennett	4,350	14.05	–6.81
Total valid votes		30,957	99.17	
Total rejected, unmarked and declined ballots		258	0.83	+0.25
Turnout		31,215	63.68	–6.48
Eligible voters		49,020		
Progressive Conservative hold		Swing		+10.50
Source: Elections Ontario

1990 Ontario general election
Party	Candidate	Votes	%	±%
Progressive Conservative	Mike Harris	15,469	45.85	–4.83
Liberal	Stan D. Lawlor	10,745	31.85	–5.78
New Democratic	Dawson Pratt	7,039	20.86	+11.33
Family Coalition	Edward J. Gauthier	488	1.45	–0.72
Total valid votes		33,741	99.42	
Total rejected, unmarked and declined ballots		196	0.58	+0.16
Turnout		33,937	70.16	+1.40
Eligible voters		48,371		
Progressive Conservative hold		Swing		+0.48
Source: Elections Ontario

1987 Ontario general election
Party	Candidate	Votes	%	±%
Progressive Conservative	Mike Harris	15,744	50.68	+0.82
Liberal	Martha Smith	11,690	37.63	+0.82
New Democratic	Sandra Clifford	2,961	9.53	–3.80
Family Coalition	Brendan Purtill	672	2.16	–
Total valid votes		31,067	99.58	
Total rejected ballots		131	0.42	–0.04
Turnout		31,198	68.76	+4.16
Eligible voters		45,371		
Progressive Conservative hold		Swing		+0.00
Source: Elections Ontario

1985 Ontario general election
Party	Candidate	Votes	%	±%
Progressive Conservative	Mike Harris	14,900	49.86	–5.58
Liberal	Mike Gauthier	11,002	36.81	–1.53
New Democratic	Lynne Bennett	3,984	13.33	+7.10
Total valid votes		29,886	99.54	
Total rejected ballots		139	0.46	+0.15
Turnout		30,025	64.60	+0.54
Eligible voters		46,479		
Progressive Conservative hold		Swing		–2.03
Source: Elections Ontario

1981 Ontario general election
Party	Candidate	Votes	%	±%
Progressive Conservative	Mike Harris	15,795	55.43	+17.88
Liberal	Mike Bolan	10,924	38.34	–4.79
New Democratic	Arthur Matti Peltomaa	1,774	6.23	–13.09
Total valid votes		28,493	99.69	
Total rejected ballots		90	0.31	–0.23
Turnout		28,583	64.06	–7.12
Eligible voters		44,617		
Progressive Conservative gain from Liberal		Swing		+11.33
Source: Elections Ontario

1977 Ontario general election
Party	Candidate	Votes	%	±%
Liberal	Mike Bolan	12,898	43.13	–11.22
Progressive Conservative	Merle Dickerson	11,232	37.56	+12.15
New Democratic	Dennis Arsenault	5,777	19.32	+1.38
Total valid votes		29,907	99.45	
Total rejected ballots		164	0.55	+0.28
Turnout		30,071	71.18	+1.80
Eligible voters		42,247		
Liberal hold		Swing		–11.68
Source: Elections Ontario

1975 Ontario general election
Party	Candidate	Votes	%	±%
Liberal	Richard Smith	15,483	54.35	+12.40
Progressive Conservative	John Valiquette	7,239	25.41	–16.44
New Democratic	Mike O'Hallarn	5,110	17.94	+1.74
Independent	Ed Deibel	658	2.31	–
Total valid votes		28,490	99.73	
Total rejected ballots		76	0.27	–0.28
Turnout		28,566	69.38	–5.23
Eligible voters		41,173		
Liberal hold		Swing		+14.42
Source: Elections Ontario

1971 Ontario general election
Party	Candidate	Votes	%	±%
Liberal	Richard Smith	12,166	41.95	–1.03
Progressive Conservative	Merle Dickerson	12,138	41.85	+0.33
New Democratic	Jack Wynter	4,698	16.20	+0.69
Total valid votes		29,002	99.45	
Total rejected ballots		160	0.55	+0.07
Turnout		29,162	74.61	+3.66
Eligible voters		39,087		
Liberal hold		Swing		–0.68
Source: Elections Ontario

1967 Ontario general election
Party	Candidate	Votes	%	±%
Liberal	Richard Smith	9,471	42.98	–0.26
Progressive Conservative	Bruce J. Goulet	9,150	41.52	+0.34
New Democratic	Ray Emery	3,417	15.51	–0.08
Total valid votes		22,038	99.52	
Total rejected ballots		107	0.48	+0.02
Turnout		22,145	70.95	–0.43
Eligible voters		31,213		
Liberal hold		Swing		–0.30
Source: Elections Ontario

Ontario provincial by-election, September 15, 1965 Death of Leo Troy
Party	Candidate	Votes	%	±%
Liberal	Richard Smith	10,729	43.24	–4.29
Progressive Conservative	John Gorman	10,217	41.17	–2.49
New Democratic	Reginald Finnemore	3,868	15.59	+6.77
Total valid votes		24,814	99.54	
Total rejected ballots		115	0.46	–0.13
Turnout		24,929	71.38	+3.98
Eligible voters		34,925		
Liberal hold		Swing		–0.90
Source: Elections Ontario

1963 Ontario general election
Party	Candidate	Votes	%	±%
Liberal	Leo Troy	11,424	47.52	–2.38
Progressive Conservative	John Gorman	10,495	43.66	+2.73
New Democratic	Joseph Benonie Levert	2,119	8.82	–0.35
Total valid votes		24,038	99.40	
Total rejected ballots		144	0.60	–0.22
Turnout		24,182	67.40	+4.53
Eligible voters		35,880		
Liberal hold		Swing		–2.56
Source: Elections Ontario

1959 Ontario general election
Party	Candidate	Votes	%	±%
Liberal	Leo Troy	10,390	49.91	+20.57
Progressive Conservative	Jean Marc Chaput	8,520	40.93	–10.11
Co-operative Commonwealth	Leonard Herbert Thomas	1,908	9.17	–8.18
Total valid votes		20,818	99.18	
Total rejected ballots		172	0.82	–0.34
Turnout		20,990	62.87	+2.31
Eligible voters		33,388		
Liberal gain from Progressive Conservative		Swing		+15.34
Source: Elections Ontario

1955 Ontario general election
Party	Candidate	Votes	%	±%
Progressive Conservative	Jean Marc Chaput	8,723	51.04	–1.19
Liberal	Rene Bourassa	5,015	29.34	–0.21
Co-operative Commonwealth	Jeff Hall	2,965	17.35	–0.21
Independent	Dominic C. Romain	389	2.28	–
Total valid votes		17,092	98.84	
Total rejected ballots		200	1.16	–0.06
Turnout		17,292	60.56	+2.14
Eligible voters		28,555		
Progressive Conservative hold		Swing		–0.49
Source: Elections Ontario

Ontario provincial by-election, September 16, 1954 Death of William Bruce Harvey
Party	Candidate	Votes	%	±%
Progressive Conservative	Jean Marc Chaput	8,996	52.22	+5.50
Liberal	Rene Bourassa	5,091	29.55	–9.16
Co-operative Commonwealth	Jeff Hall	3,024	17.55	+3.00
Independent	Lionel Laframboise	115	0.67	–
Total valid votes		17,226	98.78	
Total rejected ballots		212	1.22	+0.16
Turnout		17,438	58.42	–6.65
Eligible voters		29,851		
Progressive Conservative hold		Swing		+7.33
Source: Elections Ontario

1951 Ontario general election
Party	Candidate	Votes	%	±%
Progressive Conservative	William Bruce Harvey	8,219	46.73	+6.71
Liberal	Rodolphe Blais	6,810	38.72	+6.22
Co-operative Commonwealth	Harold Gallagher	2,561	14.56	–6.79
Total valid votes		17,590	98.95	
Total rejected ballots		187	1.05	+0.14
Turnout		17,777	65.06	–3.54
Eligible voters		27,322		
Progressive Conservative hold		Swing		+0.25
Source: Elections Ontario

1948 Ontario general election
Party	Candidate	Votes	%	±%
Progressive Conservative	William Bruce Harvey	6,903	40.01	+13.30
Liberal	Victor Martin	5,607	32.50	–2.95
Co-operative Commonwealth	B. G. Marquette	3,683	21.35	–7.46
Union of Electors	Armand Cote	1,060	6.14	–
Total valid votes		17,253	99.09	
Total rejected ballots		158	0.91	–0.03
Turnout		17,411	68.61	–5.28
Eligible voters		25,378		
Progressive Conservative gain from Liberal		Swing		+10.38
Source: Elections Ontario

1945 Ontario general election
Party	Candidate	Votes	%	±%
Liberal	Victor Martin	5,988	35.45	–6.99
Co-operative Commonwealth	Arthur Allen Casselman	4,865	28.80	–11.95
Progressive Conservative	John A. Allen	4,512	26.71	+9.91
Independent	Avit J. Seguin	1,525	9.03	–
Total valid votes		16,890	99.06	
Total rejected ballots		160	0.94	+0.94
Turnout		17,050	73.89	+13.41
Eligible voters		23,076		
Liberal gain from Co-operative Commonwealth		Swing		+2.48
Source: Elections Ontario

1943 Ontario general election
Party	Candidate	Votes	%	±%
Co-operative Commonwealth	Arthur Allen Casselman	5,642	40.75	–
Liberal	Joseph Marceau	4,005	28.93	–20.53
Progressive Conservative	Ernest J. Young	2,327	16.81	–20.44
Liberal	Cyril Peter Smith	1,871	13.51	–35.94
Total valid votes		13,845	100.00	
Total rejected ballots		–		
Turnout		13,845	60.47	–12.69
Eligible voters		22,895		
Co-operative Commonwealth gain from Liberal		Swing		+10.22
Source: Elections Ontario

1937 Ontario general election
Party	Candidate	Votes	%	±%
Liberal	Joseph Élie Cholette	8,669	49.46	–23.31
Conservative	Robert Rowe	6,529	37.25	+10.02
Independent Liberal	Cyril Peter Smith	2,121	12.10	–
Independent	Harold Beresford Gibbs	209	1.19	–
Total valid votes		17,528	99.05	
Total rejected ballots		169	0.96	+0.96
Turnout		17,697	73.16	–
Eligible voters		24,189		
Liberal hold		Swing		–16.67
Source: Elections Ontario

Ontario provincial by-election, March 4, 1935 Death of Théodore Legault
Party	Candidate	Votes	%	±%
Liberal	Joseph Marceau	10,877	72.77	+5.97
Conservative	Eli J. Lawrence	4,070	27.23	–5.97
Total valid votes		14,947	100.00	
Total rejected ballots		–		
Turnout		14,947	–	–
Eligible voters				
Liberal hold		Swing		+5.97
Source: Elections Ontario

1934 Ontario general election
Party	Candidate	Votes	%	±%
Liberal	Théodore Legault	12,149	66.80	+34.22
Conservative	Charles Robert Harrison	6,038	33.20	–34.22
Total valid votes		18,187	98.78	
Total rejected ballots		224	1.22	+1.22
Turnout		18,411	74.90	–
Eligible voters		24,581		
Liberal gain from Conservative		Swing		+34.22
Source: Elections Ontario

Ontario provincial by-election, October 29, 1930 Resignation of Henri Morel to run in the 1930 federal election
Party	Candidate	Votes	%	±%
Conservative	Charles Robert Harrison	5,984	67.42	+9.43
Liberal	Joseph Marceau	2,892	32.58	–9.43
Total valid votes		8,876	100.00	
Total rejected ballots		–		
Turnout		8,876	–	–
Eligible voters				
Conservative hold		Swing		+9.43
Source: Elections Ontario

1929 Ontario general election
Party	Candidate	Votes	%	±%
Conservative	Henri Morel	4,859	57.99	–3.10
Liberal	John Hay McDonald	3,520	42.01	–
Total valid votes		8,379	99.37	
Total rejected ballots		53	0.63	+0.14
Turnout		8,432	62.41	+6.61
Eligible voters		13,510		
Conservative hold		Swing		–1.55
Source: Elections Ontario

1926 Ontario general election
Party	Candidate	Votes	%	±%
Conservative	Henri Morel	5,215	61.09	+12.26
Independent Liberal	Joseph Marceau	1,801	21.10	–23.69
Prohibitionist	John W. Richardson	1,521	17.82	–
Total valid votes		8,537	99.51	
Total rejected ballots		42	0.49	–1.79
Turnout		8,579	55.81	+2.56
Eligible voters		15,373		
Conservative hold		Swing		+17.97
Source: Elections Ontario

1923 Ontario general election
Party	Candidate	Votes	%	±%
Conservative	Henri Morel	3,238	48.83	+21.02
Liberal	Joseph Marceau	2,970	44.79	+2.35
Labour	James McIlvenna	423	6.38	–23.37
Total valid votes		6,631	97.72	
Total rejected ballots		155	2.28	–0.12
Turnout		6,786	53.25	–15.63
Eligible voters		12,744		
Conservative gain from Liberal		Swing		+22.19
Source: Elections Ontario

1919 Ontario general election
Party	Candidate	Votes	%	±%
Liberal	Joseph Marceau	3,122	42.44	–1.41
Labour	James T. Wilson	2,188	29.74	–
Conservative	Henri Morel	2,046	27.81	–17.65
Total valid votes		7,356	97.60	
Total rejected ballots		181	2.40	+0.95
Turnout		7,537	68.88	+6.14
Eligible voters		10,943		
Liberal gain from Conservative		Swing		+16.24
Source: Elections Ontario

1914 Ontario general election
Party	Candidate	Votes	%	±%
Conservative	Henri Morel	1,638	45.46	–19.01
Liberal	Joseph Marceau	1,580	43.85	+8.32
Independent	James McIlvenna	385	10.69	–
Total valid votes		3,603	98.55	
Total rejected ballots		53	1.45	+0.42
Turnout		3,656	62.73	+12.56
Eligible voters		5,828		
Conservative hold		Swing		–13.67
Source: Elections Ontario

1911 Ontario general election
Party	Candidate	Votes	%	±%
Conservative	Henri Morel	1,800	64.47	+5.38
Liberal	Robert Rankin	992	35.53	–5.38
Total valid votes		2,792	98.97	
Total rejected ballots		29	1.03	+0.28
Turnout		2,821	50.17	–17.46
Eligible voters		5,623		
Conservative hold		Swing		+5.38
Source: Elections Ontario

1908 Ontario general election
Party	Candidate	Votes	%	±%
Conservative	Henri Morel	1,654	59.09	–
Liberal	John Loughrin	1,145	40.91	–
Total valid votes		2,799	99.26	
Total rejected ballots		21	0.74	+0.74
Turnout		2,820	67.63	–
Eligible voters		4,170		
Conservative notional gain from Liberal		Swing		–
Source: Elections Ontario

Ontario provincial by-election, December 27, 1898 Void election
Party	Candidate	Votes	%	±%
Liberal	John Loughrin	1,842	63.67	+12.69
Conservative	Charles Lamarche	1,051	36.33	–12.69
Total valid votes		2,893	100.00	
Total rejected ballots		–		
Turnout		2,893	–	–
Eligible voters				
Liberal hold		Swing		+12.69
Source: Elections Ontario

1898 Ontario general election
Party	Candidate	Votes	%	±%
Liberal	John Loughrin	1,590	50.98	–14.86
Conservative	Charles Lamarche	1,529	49.02	–
Total valid votes		3,119	100.00	
Total rejected ballots		–		
Turnout		3,119	97.47	+41.34
Eligible voters		3,200		
Liberal hold		Swing		–7.43
Source: Elections Ontario

1894 Ontario general election
Party	Candidate	Votes	%	±%
Liberal	John Loughrin	1,345	65.83	–1.42
Independent	Stephen Fournier	698	34.17	–
Total valid votes		2,043	99.76	
Total rejected ballots		5	0.24	–0.44
Turnout		2,048	56.13	–8.44
Eligible voters		3,649		
Liberal hold		Swing		–0.71
Source: Elections Ontario

1890 Ontario general election
Party	Candidate	Votes	%
Liberal	John Loughrin	881	67.25
Conservative	D. Purvis	429	32.75
Total valid votes		1,310	99.32
Total rejected ballots		9	0.68
Turnout		1,319	64.56
Eligible voters		2,043	
Liberal pickup new district.			
Source: Elections Ontario

== 2007 electoral reform referendum ==
2007 Ontario electoral reform referendum
Side	Votes	%
First Past the Post	23,095	72.9
Mixed member proportional	8,596	27.1
Total valid votes	31,691	100.0

== See also ==
- List of Ontario provincial electoral districts
- Canadian provincial electoral districts
