= Merle Dickerson =

Canadian politician

Mayor of North Bay, Ontario
- In office 1954–1960
- Preceded by: Arthur Beattie
- Succeeded by: Cecil Hewitt
- In office 1966–1971
- Preceded by: Cecil Hewitt
- Succeeded by: Bruce Goulet
- In office 1973–1980
- Preceded by: Bruce Goulet
- Succeeded by: Jack Smylie
- In office 1982–1984
- Preceded by: Jack Smylie
- Succeeded by: Stan Lawlor

Personal details
- Born: 1911/1912 Lindsay, Ontario
- Died: June 9, 1984

Merle Dickerson (1911/1912 – June 9, 1984) was a Canadian politician, who served as a longtime mayor of North Bay, Ontario. A "colourful" populist, he was frequently re-elected despite various legal infractions.

== Early life ==
Originally from Lindsay, Dickerson was involved in municipal politics in Lindsay in his early 20s, and was briefly barred from holding office in a conflict of interest charge over his business dealings with the town's hydroelectricity commission. He later served in the Canadian Armed Forces during World War II before moving to North Bay, where he worked as a building contractor.

He ran as a Cooperative Commonwealth Federation candidate in Nipissing in the 1949 federal election, losing to Jack Garland. During this time, he was also found guilty of using his position as chair of North Bay's hydroelectricity commission to illegally tap into power lines to power rental housing that he owned without paying for it, although the conviction was overturned on appeal to the Supreme Court of Ontario.

== Mayoralty ==
First elected in the municipal election of 1953, he took office at the beginning of 1954. Early in his first term, the council faced controversy when the city spent $265 to purchase blazers with the city crest on them for city councillors. In 1955, he sent a list of parking tickets to the city manager with a request that they be "fixed", forcing council to take a vote to explicitly ban the practice.

In 1958, he entered the nomination contest to be the Progressive Conservative candidate in Nipissing in the 1958 federal election, losing to former city councillor John Kennedy.

In 1960, he extended an invitation to Fidel Castro to visit the city as judge of a community beard-growing contest. He stepped down from the mayoralty in the 1960 municipal election, but ran for and won reelection as an alderman.

He ran for mayor again in the 1965 municipal election. In 1966, he participated in a committee of mayors appointed to study the feasibility of Northern Ontario separating from Ontario to form a new province, alongside G. W. Maybury of Kapuskasing, Ernest Reid of Fort William, Leo Del Villano of Timmins, Max Silverman of Sudbury and Leo Foucault of Espanola. In 1967, he fended off an attempt to unseat him on the grounds of insolvency, after a businessman for whom he had previously cosigned a car loan declared bankruptcy.

In 1968, he called upon the federal government to support a plan to build a canal to enable shipping traffic through Northern Ontario along the Ottawa River and French River systems.

In his second stint as mayor he served until 1971, when he ran for election to the Legislative Assembly of Ontario in the 1971 provincial election as an Ontario Progressive Conservative Party candidate in Nipissing. He lost to Richard Smith by a margin of just 44 votes. He then ran for reelection as mayor, but was defeated by Bruce Goulet. He ran for mayor again in the 1973 municipal election, defeating Goulet.

In 1975, Dickerson was arrested in a police raid on the Canton Gardens restaurant in North Bay, when he was found playing poker in an illegal gambling room. He was found guilty and sentenced to 15 days in jail. In the subsequent 1976 election, he was returned to office with the largest majority of his entire career.

He ran in the 1977 provincial election, again as a Progressive Conservative in Nipissing, and lost to Mike Bolan.

In the 1978 municipal election, Dickerson was reelected for what he had stated during the campaign would be his final term as mayor. Following the election, however, he faced corruption charges spurred by allegations that he had offered bribes to ineligible voters, including an underage teenager and several non-residents of the city, to vote for him, as well as claims that he had offered a competitor, city councillor Ed Deibel, a job in exchange for his withdrawal from the mayoral race. On July 7, 1980, judge Ward Allen of the Nipissing District Court found Dickerson guilty of the charges, ordering him immediately removed from office and barring him from running in any election for two years. Despite not being able to run for office, however, he actively campaigned on behalf of other council candidates he favoured.

Once his sentence was up, he ran again in the 1982 municipal election, hoping to rehabilitate his image. He was re-elected, although Deibel petitioned the Ontario Supreme Court for an injunction against Dickerson taking office, which was not granted.

Dickerson remained in office until his death on June 9, 1984.
