= Nipissing East =

Former provincial electoral district in Ontario, Canada

Ontario electoral district

Defunct provincial electoral district
- Legislature: Legislative Assembly of Ontario
- District created: 1902
- District abolished: 1908
- First contested: 1902
- Last contested: 1905

Demographics
- Census division: Nipissing District
- Census subdivision(s): Mattawa, North Bay

Nipissing East was a provincial electoral district in Ontario, Canada, active from 1902 to 1908.

Due to population growth, the district of Nipissing was divided into Nipissing East and Nipissing West for the 1902 election. By 1908, however, population changes in Nipissing West led to that district being divided into the new districts of Sudbury and Sturgeon Falls, and Nipissing East was dissolved back into the Nipissing district.

== Members of Provincial Parliament ==
Nipissing East
Assembly	Years	Member	Party
Created from parts of Nipissing before the 1902 election
10th	1902–1904	Michael James	Liberal
11th	1905–1905	Charles Lamarche	Conservative
11th	1905–1908	Francis Cochrane	Conservative
Sourced from the Ontario Legislative Assembly
Merged into Nipissing before the 1908 election

== Election results ==
Ontario provincial by-election, June 13, 1905 Resignation of Charles Lamarche to provide a seat for Francis Cochrane
Party	Candidate	Votes
Conservative	Francis Cochrane	acclaimed
Source: Elections Ontario

1905 Ontario general election
Party	Candidate	Votes	%	±%
Conservative	Charles Lamarche	1,524	49.48	+4.05
Liberal	Michael James	1,461	47.44	–7.13
Independent Conservative	A. Limoges	95	3.08	–
Total valid votes		3,080	99.32	
Total rejected ballots		21	0.68	–0.43
Turnout		3,101	58.63	+8.38
Eligible voters		5,289		
Conservative gain from Liberal		Swing		+5.59
Source: Elections Ontario

1902 Ontario general election
Party	Candidate	Votes	%
Liberal	Michael James	1,218	54.57
Conservative	George Smith	1,014	45.43
Total valid votes		2,232	98.89
Total rejected ballots		25	1.11
Turnout		2,257	50.26
Eligible voters		4,491	
Liberal pickup new district.			
Source: Elections Ontario

== See also ==
- List of Ontario provincial electoral districts
- Canadian provincial electoral districts
