= Glenn Thibeault =

Canadian politician (born 1969)

The Honourable Glenn Thibeault ECO
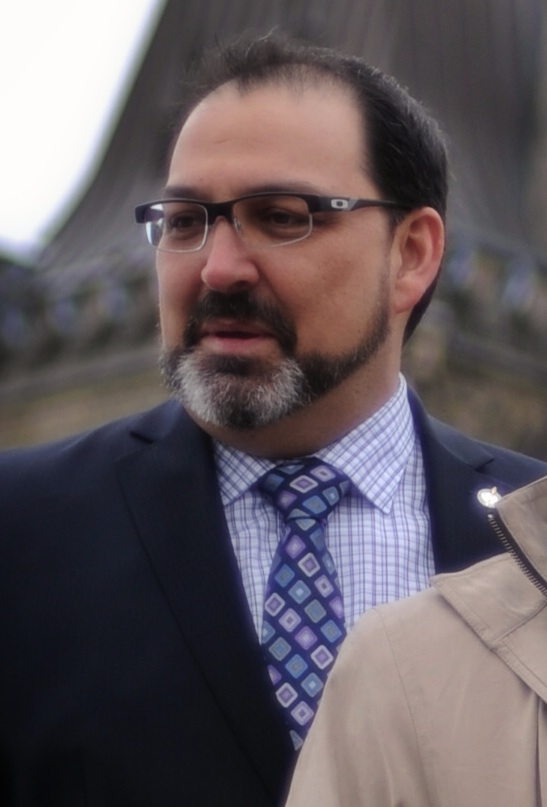
- Thibeault in 2014

Ontario Minister of Energy
- In office 13 June 2016 – 29 June 2018
- Premier: Kathleen Wynne
- Preceded by: Bob Chiarelli
- Succeeded by: Greg Rickford (Energy, Northern Development and Mines)

Member of the Ontario Provincial Parliament for Sudbury
- In office 5 February 2015 – 7 June 2018
- Preceded by: Joe Cimino
- Succeeded by: Jamie West

Member of Parliament for Sudbury
- In office 14 October 2008 – 2 January 2015
- Preceded by: Diane Marleau
- Succeeded by: Paul Lefebvre

Personal details
- Born: Glenn Edward Thibeault; 23 October 1969 (age 57) Sudbury, Ontario, Canada
- Party: Ontario Liberal (2014–present)
- Other political affiliations: New Democratic (2008–2015)
- Spouse: Yolanda Thibeault
- Occupation: Politician; journalist; executive director

Glenn Edward Thibeault (born 23 October 1969) is a former Canadian politician. He was Liberal member of the Legislative Assembly of Ontario from 2015 to 2018 who represented the riding of Sudbury. He served as a cabinet minister in the government of Kathleen Wynne. From 2008 to 2015, he represented the federal electoral district of Sudbury in the House of Commons of Canada as a member of the New Democratic Party.

On 16 December 2014, Thibeault announced that he would be resigning from the House of Commons in order to run for the provincial Ontario Liberal Party in a by-election in the provincial riding of Sudbury for a seat in the Ontario legislature after being recruited by Ontario Premier Kathleen Wynne. His resignation became official on 5 January 2015, shortly before Wynne called the by-election. He won the by-election on 5 February 2015 but was defeated in the general election in 2018.

== Background ==
Thibeault was born in Sudbury, and was a newscaster and reporter at local stations CIGM and CJRQ during the 1990s. He later graduated from the developmental services worker program at Cambrian College, and was hired as a behavioural consultant for the West Vancouver School Board in British Columbia. He worked for five years as coordinator at the Mainstream Association for Pro-Active Community Living in Vancouver, and returned to Sudbury in 2003 to become campaign director of the United Way of Sudbury and District. In June 2005, he was promoted to executive director. The United Way held several successful campaigns in this period, increasing its total from $1.3 million in 2003 to $2.3 million in 2007.

== Federal politics ==
Thibeault won the New Democratic Party's Sudbury nomination in September 2008, after the resignation of previously nominated candidate Gerry McIntaggart and the withdrawal of Dave Battaino from the contest. He received endorsements from the Sudbury Star newspaper, the Sudbury and District Labour Council and United Steelworkers of America Local 2020, and won an upset victory over six-term Liberal Party incumbent Diane Marleau.

The Conservative Party won a minority government in this election, and Thibeault entered parliament as a member of the opposition. He was appointed as his party's critic for consumer protection and amateur sport in late November 2008. Along with other New Democratic Party MPs, he later called for an investigation into the Canadian Food Inspection Agency's handling of tainted milk that was sold in Sudbury and other parts of Ontario. Thibeault supported a planned coalition government of Liberals and New Democrats in late 2008, and wrote an editorial describing Conservative Prime Minister Stephen Harper as a "coward" for proroguing parliament when it appeared his government would be defeated by the coalition in a motion of non-confidence. The coalition was abandoned when Michael Ignatieff became Liberal Party leader, and decided to support the Conservative government's January 2009 budget.

Thibeault called on the federal government to regulate interest rates and fees on credit cards and debit cards in March 2009, describing existing rates as "out of control" and a hindrance to consumers and businesses during an economic downturn. Finance Minister Jim Flaherty later announced that his government would launch an education campaign and provide for increased disclosure on credit-card statements, but would not regulate rates. Thibeault described this as "disappointing". On 18 June 2009, Thibeault introduced a private member's bill to cap annual interest rates on credit cards to no more than five per cent above the current Bank of Canada target for overnight rates.

Thibeault also introduced a private member's bill in April 2009 to ensure the cost of Applied Behavioural Analysis (ABA) and Intensive Behavioural Intervention (IBI) for autistic persons is provided by health insurance programs in every province. He later introduced another private bill to have the third Saturday in June recognized as Emergency Services Appreciation Day in Canada.

Thibeault stood with striking workers from Vale Inco in the summer of 2009, and criticized Industry Minister Tony Clement's announcement that the federal government would not intervene to stop job and production cuts in Sudbury. He called for Clement's resignation after the minister stated that Vale had "saved Sudbury" from becoming a "Valley of Death" by purchasing Inco in 2006. He also protested cuts to the Canadian Broadcasting Corporation's Northern Ontario radio services in this period.

Thibeault, as the New Democrat critic for Sport, has been instrumental in raising national awareness about the very serious increase of violence in amateur sport and the ongoing concussion epidemic plaguing amateur hockey. He called for a Royal Commission to study violence in sports in February 2010; his call has been echoed by others, including Jaime Watt, a conservative strategist. In February 2011, Thibeault introduced Bill C-616, calling for a national strategy to reduce the incidence of serious injury in amateur sport.

He was successfully re-elected in the 2011 election. The next year he supported Thomas Mulcair's successful bid to become leader of the NDP. Thibeault served as caucus chairperson from April 2014 until resigning on 2 December 2014 citing family reasons.

== Provincial politics ==
Thibeault supported Gilles Bisson's bid to lead the Ontario New Democratic Party at its 2009 leadership convention.

Following the resignation of Ontario NDP Sudbury Member of Provincial Parliament Joe Cimino, Thibeault announced on 16 December 2014, that he would be resigning as an NDP MP in order to run in the upcoming by-election in the provincial Sudbury riding as the Ontario Liberal Party's candidate after being appointed the party's candidate by Premier Kathleen Wynne. His appointment faced some controversy when Andrew Olivier, the party's candidate in the 2014 election, alleged that he had been offered a job or appointment by party strategists in exchange for withdrawing his candidacy from the nomination contest, although Thibeault himself was never personally implicated in the allegations.

Thibeault was a Parliamentary Assistant to the Minister of Environment and Climate Change from 2015 to 2016.

On 13 June 2016, Thibeault replaced Bob Chiarelli as Minister of Energy in a Liberal cabinet shuffle.

=== Cabinet positions ===
Wynne ministry, Province of Ontario (2013–2018)
Cabinet post (1)
Predecessor	Office	Successor
Bob Chiarelli	Minister of Energy; 2016-2018	Greg Rickford

== Electoral record ==
2018 Ontario general election: Sudbury
Party	Candidate	Votes	%	±%	Expenditures
New Democratic	Jamie West	17,386	48.07	+12.92	$26,455
Progressive Conservative	Troy Crowder	8,405	23.24	+15.73	$44,759
Liberal	Glenn Thibeault	8,108	22.42	–18.83	$97,933
Green	David Robinson	1,504	4.16	+0.91	$8,082
Consensus Ontario	Mila Chavez Wong	284	0.79	–	–
Libertarian	James Wendler	212	0.59	–	–
None of the Above	David Sylvestre	186	0.51	–	$0
Independent	J. David Popescu	82	0.23	+0.13	–
Total valid votes		36,167	98.95		
Total rejected, unmarked and declined ballots		382	1.05	+0.49	
Turnout		36,549	54.22	+14.53	
Eligible voters		67,410			
New Democratic gain from Liberal		Swing		–1.40	
Source: Elections Ontario

Ontario provincial by-election, February 5, 2015: Sudbury Resignation of Joe Cimino
Party	Candidate	Votes	%	±%
Liberal	Glenn Thibeault	10,640	41.25	+1.90
New Democratic	Suzanne Shawbonquit	9,067	35.15	–7.09
Independent	Andrew Olivier	3,183	12.34	–27.01
Progressive Conservative	Paula Peroni	1,937	7.51	–6.29
Green	David Robinson	837	3.24	–0.34
People's Political Party	Jean-Raymond Audet	39	0.15	–
Pauper	John Turmel	25	0.10	–
Independent	J. David Popescu	24	0.09	–0.22
Independent	Ed Pokonzie	22	0.09	–
Independent	James Waddell	21	0.08	–
Total valid votes		25,795	99.45	
Total rejected, unmarked and declined ballots		143	0.55	–0.56
Turnout		25,938	39.69	–12.23
Eligible voters		65,356		
Liberal gain from New Democratic		Swing		+4.50
Independent candidate Andrew Olivier lost 27.00 percentage points from the 2014 election, when he ran as a Liberal.
Source: Elections Ontario

2011 Canadian federal election: Sudbury
Party	Candidate	Votes	%	±%	Expenditures
New Democratic	Glenn Thibeault	22,684	49.92	+14.77	–
Conservative	Fred Slade	12,881	28.35	+2.56	–
Liberal	Carol Hartman	8,172	17.98	-12.22	–
Green	Frederick Twilley	1,359	2.99	-4.76	–
First Peoples National	Will Morin	229	0.50	-0.42	–
Independent	David Popescu	116	0.26	+0.07	–
Total valid votes/expense limit		45,441	100.00		
Total rejected ballots		180	0.39	-0.05	
Turnout		45,621	63.89	+5.38	
Eligible voters		71,409	–	–	

2008 Canadian federal election: Sudbury
Party	Candidate	Votes	%	±%	Expenditures
New Democratic	Glenn Thibeault	15,094	35.15	+3.20	$71,329
Liberal	Diane Marleau	12,969	30.20	−11.37	$50,177
Conservative	Gerry Labelle	11,073	25.79	+4.11	$85,730
Green	Gordon Harris	3,330	7.75	+5.02	$8,704
First Peoples National	Will Morin	397	0.92		$0
Independent	David Popescu	80	0.19	+0.08	$148
Total valid votes/expense limit		42,943	100.00	$82,461	
Total rejected ballots		192	0.45	−0.03	
Turnout		43,135	58.51	−7.48	
Electors on the lists		73,724			
Note: italicized expenditure totals refer to data that has not yet been finalized by Elections Canada.
