= Joseph Michaud =

Joseph Michaud may refer to:

- Joseph-François Michaud (1767–1839), French historian and journalist
- Joseph-Enoil Michaud (1888–1967), New Brunswick lawyer and politician
- Joseph Michaud (Ontario politician) (1857–?), Canadian politician
