= Francis Cochrane =

Canadian politician (1852–1919)

The Honourable Francis Cochrane PC
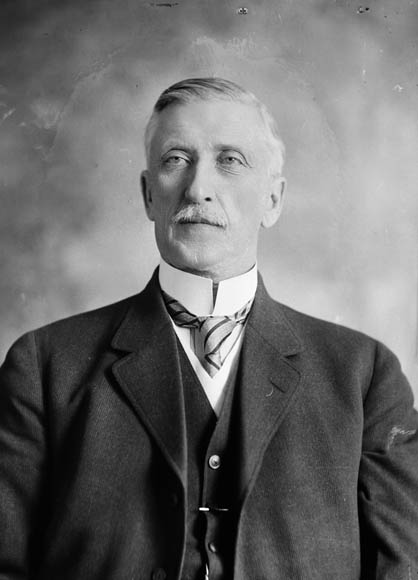

MPP for Nipissing East
- In office 1905–1908
- Preceded by: Charles Lamarche
- Succeeded by: riding dissolved

MPP for Sudbury
- In office 1908–1911
- Preceded by: first member
- Succeeded by: Charles McCrea

MP for Nipissing
- In office 1911–1917
- Preceded by: George Gordon
- Succeeded by: Charles Robert Harrison

MP for Timiskaming
- In office 1917–1919
- Preceded by: first member
- Succeeded by: Angus McDonald

Personal details
- Born: November 18, 1852 Clarenceville, Quebec
- Died: September 22, 1919 (aged 66) Ottawa, Ontario
- Party: Conservative
- Occupation: Merchant

Francis Cochrane, PC (November 18, 1852 – September 22, 1919), was a Canadian politician.

== Early life ==
Cochrane was born in 1852 in Clarenceville, Quebec. He worked for Marshall Field in Chicago during the 1870s before moving to Pembroke, Ontario, where he met his wife, Alice Dunlap. He and Alice lived in Mattawa, Ontario, during the 1880s before they moved to Sudbury. While living in Mattawa, Cochrane hosted Prime Minister John A. Macdonald at his home while he recovered from a brief illness.

== Municipal career ==
A prosperous hardware merchant in Sudbury, Ontario, he was the first president of the town's board of trade and later served as mayor of the town in 1897, 1898, and 1902 after winning a council seat in 1896.

Along with the local businessman William McVittie, he subsequently invested in the Wahnapitae Power Company, which was contracted to provide the town's hydroelectricity services until it was sold to the Hydroelectric Power Commission of Ontario in 1929. Cochrane and McVittie also ventured into prospecting, developing the Frood Extension property in 1908.

== Provincial career ==
Cochrane first ran for provincial office in 1902 as the Conservative Party candidate in Nipissing West in the 1902 election, but was defeated by Joseph Michaud. He did not run in the 1905 election though Premier James P. Whitney announced an intention to give him a cabinet portfolio. The appointment was delayed when Cochrane slipped while boarding a moving train in Sudbury and lost part of his right leg, but in May of that year, Whitney transferred the Crown lands portfolio to a new Ministry of Lands, Forests and Mines and appointed Cochrane as the new minister. Cochrane was then acclaimed into office in a by-election in Nipissing East, succeeding Charles Lamarche, who resigned to make the seat available to him.

He was re-elected in the 1908 election in the new electoral district of Sudbury.

== Federal career ==
After being re-elected in 1911 George Gordon, the Conservative MP for Nipissing, stepped aside to enable Cochrane to run in a by-election and he won the seat. Gordon was subsequently appointed to the Senate.

Cochrane served in Nipissing until 1917 and was Minister of Railways and Canals in the government of Sir Robert Borden from October 1911 until October 1917.

In 1917, he ran as the Unionist-Conservative candidate in the new district of Timiskaming. He was re-elected, and served as Minister without Portfolio until his death in 1919.

== Honours ==
The town of Cochrane, Ontario, was named after him.
