= Charles McCrea =

Canadian politician

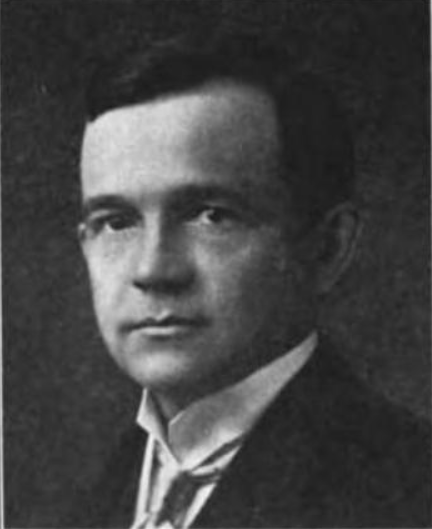

MPP for Sudbury
- In office 1911–1934
- Preceded by: Francis Cochrane
- Succeeded by: Edmond Lapierre

Personal details
- Born: December 27, 1877 Springtown, Ontario
- Died: October 30, 1952 (aged 74) Toronto, Ontario, Canada
- Party: Conservative
- Spouse: Edith Louise Dent (m. 1903)
- Children: 2
- Occupation: Businessman, lawyer, politician

Charles McCrea (December 27, 1877 – October 30, 1952) was a Canadian politician, who represented the electoral district of Sudbury in the Legislative Assembly of Ontario from 1911 to 1934. He was a member of the Conservative Party.

== Biography ==
Charles McCrea was born in Springtown, Ontario on December 27, 1877. He read law and was admitted to the bar in 1901. He married Edith Louise Dent on November 25, 1903, and they had two children.

As a lawyer and town councillor in Sudbury, he first won a seat in the legislature in the 1911 election. He served as Minister of Mines in the governments of Howard Ferguson and George Stewart Henry.

The McCrea Heights neighbourhood in Greater Sudbury is named for him.
