= Michael James (politician) =

Canadian politician

Ontario MPP
- In office 1902–1905
- Preceded by: New riding
- Succeeded by: Charles Lamarche
- Constituency: Nipissing East

Personal details
- Born: September 12, 1861 Centreville, Canada West
- Died: April 27, 1943 (aged 81) Mattawa, Ontario, Canada
- Party: Liberal
- Spouse: Mary Anne O'Meara (m. 1897)
- Occupation: Doctor

Michael James (September 12, 1861 – April 27, 1943) was a Canadian politician, who represented the electoral district of Nipissing East in the Legislative Assembly of Ontario from 1902 to 1904.

A member of the Liberal Party, he was elected in the 1902 election.

James was born in Centreville, Canada West in 1861. He died in 1943 at age 81.
