= Al McDonald =

Canadian mayor and politician

42nd Mayor of North Bay, Ontario
- In office December 1, 2010 – November 15, 2022
- Preceded by: Vic Fedeli
- Succeeded by: Peter Chirico

Ontario MPP
- In office 2002–2003
- Preceded by: Mike Harris
- Succeeded by: Monique Smith
- Constituency: Nipissing

Personal details
- Born: Marville, France
- Party: Progressive Conservative

Al McDonald is a politician in Ontario, Canada, who was mayor of North Bay, Ontario from 2010 to 2022. He was previously a Progressive Conservative member of the Legislative Assembly of Ontario from 2002 to 2003, and ran unsuccessfully for the Conservative Party of Canada in the 2004 federal election.

== Background ==
McDonald was born in Marville, France.

== Politics ==
McDonald was politically active on North Bay City Council before entering provincial politics, serving as the deputy mayor of that city for a time. He also served on the North Bay Economic Development Commission, the North Bay Police Services Board, and other local programs.

When former premier Mike Harris resigned as the member for Nipissing in early 2002, McDonald won the Progressive Conservative nomination to replace him. In a by-election held on May 2, 2002, he defeated Liberal candidate George Maroosis, also a city councillor, by 19 votes, as confirmed by a recount. McDonald served as a backbench supporter of new Premier Ernie Eves.

His tenure in office was brief. The Liberals won a majority government in the provincial election of 2003, and McDonald lost his seat to Liberal candidate Monique Smith by about 3,000 votes.

In the federal election of 2004, McDonald ran for the Conservatives in the redistributed riding of Nipissing—Timiskaming, but lost to Liberal Anthony Rota by 2,253 votes.

On August 26, 2010 McDonald announced his intention to run for mayor of North Bay in the 2010 municipal election. He won 87 per cent of the vote on election day over challengers Valerie Chadbourne and Harvey Villneff. He was elected to a second term as mayor in the 2014 municipal election.

== Electoral record ==
North Bay mayoral election, 2010
Candidate	Votes	%
Al McDonald	13,708	86.62
Valerie Chadbourne	1,549	9.79
Harvey Villneff	569	3.60

2004 Canadian federal election
Party	Candidate	Votes	%
Liberal	Anthony Rota	18,254	42.3%
Conservative	Al McDonald	16,001	37.1%
New Democratic	Dave Fluri	7,354	17.0%
Green	Les Wilcox	1,329	3.1%
Canadian Action	Ross MacLean	204	0.5%
Total valid votes		43,142	100%
Total rejected ballots		222	
Turnout		43,364	62.4%

2003 Ontario general election
Party	Candidate	Votes	%	±%
Liberal	Monique Smith	18,003	49.84	+6.70
Progressive Conservative	Al McDonald	14,978	41.47	-8.95
New Democratic	Terry O'Connor	2,613	7.23	+2.37
Green	Jaimie Board	528	1.46	+0.51

Nipissing by-election, May 2, 2002 (resignation of Mike Harris)
Party	Candidate	Votes	%	±%
Progressive Conservative	Al McDonald	13,989	45.54	-4.88
Liberal	George Maroosis	13,970	45.48	+2.34
New Democratic	Wendy Young	1,821	5.93	+1.07
Green	Todd Lucier	940	3.06	+2.11

North Bay City Council election, 2000
10 to be elected
Candidate	Vote	%
Al McDonald	9,607	8.08
Lynne Bennett (X)	8,198	6.89
Susan Church	7,559	6.35
Peter Handley (X)	6,215	5.22
Laurie Kidd	6,181	5.20
George Maroosis (X)	6,070	5.10
Mike Anthony	5,967	5.02
Peter Chirico	5,939	4.99
Sarah Campbell (X)	5,915	4.97
Maureen Boldt (X)	5,282	4.44
Jay Aspin (X)	4,947	4.16
David Thompson	4,933	4.15
Mac Bain	4,613	3.88
Wayne Poeta (X)	4,333	3.64
Kathy Hewitt	3,831	3.22
Trevor Knight	3,827	3.22
Frank O'Hagan	3,651	3.07
Murray Shave (X)	3,242	2.73
Debbie Graham	3,222	2.71
Steve Brown	2,810	2.36
Mickey Beattie	2,715	2.28
Roger Edward Guillemette	2,701	2.27
Jayson Stewart	2,608	2.19
Harley Renaud	2,384	2.00
Viola Bailey	2,214	1.86
