= Théodore Legault =

Canadian politician and merchant

Ontario MPP
- In office 1934–1935
- Preceded by: Charles Robert Harrison
- Succeeded by: Joseph Marceau
- Constituency: Nipissing
- In office 1926–1929
- Preceded by: Zotique Mageau
- Succeeded by: Albert Zenophile Aubin
- Constituency: Sturgeon Falls

Personal details
- Born: July 26, 1886 Wendover, Ontario
- Died: January 17, 1935 (aged 48)
- Party: Liberal
- Spouse: Estelle Bourdon

Théodore Legault (July 26, 1886 – January 17, 1935) was an Ontario merchant and political figure. He represented Sturgeon Falls in the Legislative Assembly of Ontario from 1926 to 1929 as an Independent-Liberal and then Nipissing as a Liberal member from 1934 until his death in 1935.

He was born in Wendover, Ontario, the son of Hormidas Legault. In 1912, he married Estelle Bourdon. He served as mayor of Sturgeon Falls in 1922 and was president of the local Board of Trade. Legault was also a member of the Knights of Columbus.

His son, Carl Legault, represented the riding of Nipissing in the House of Commons of Canada from 1964 to 1972 with the Liberal Party.
