= Monique Smith (Canadian politician) =

Canadian politician

The Honourable Monique Smith ECO

Ontario MPP
- In office 2003–2011
- Preceded by: Al McDonald
- Succeeded by: Vic Fedeli
- Constituency: Nipissing

Personal details
- Born: 1965 (age 60–61) North Bay, Ontario
- Party: Liberal
- Relations: Richard Smith, father
- Occupation: Lawyer

Monique M. Smith (born c. 1965) is a former politician in Ontario, Canada. She was a Liberal member of the Legislative Assembly of Ontario from 2003 to 2011 who represented the riding of Nipissing. She was a cabinet minister in the government of Dalton McGuinty.

== Background ==
Smith was born and raised in North Bay, Ontario, the largest city in the Nipissing riding. She has a Bachelor of Arts degree from the University of Toronto, and a law degree from Queen's University. After graduating, she worked at the Toronto law firm of McCarthy Tétrault until 1997, when she resigned to work as chief of staff for provincial Liberal leader Dalton McGuinty. She served as director of operations for the Liberals in the 1999 provincial election, which the party lost.

After this election, Smith became executive director of the Association of Canadian Publishers, and represented the organization across the country. She returned to North Bay in 2002, and worked for the firm of Larmer and Larmer.

Her father, Dick Smith, represented Nipissing in the legislature from 1965 to 1977. Her mother Marthe Smith was the Liberal candidate for the riding in 1987.

== Politics ==
Smith ran for political office in the 2003 provincial election, in the Nipissing riding (until recently held by former Progressive Conservative Premier Mike Harris). Despite her roots in the North Bay community, she was often described as a "Toronto lawyer" and a "parachute candidate" by the Tory campaign. These criticisms were not an obstacle to her being elected, and she defeated Harris' immediate successor, Al McDonald, by just over 3,000 votes.

The Liberals won the election, and Smith was subsequently named parliamentary assistant to George Smitherman, the Minister of Health and Long-Term Care. In December 2003, Smitherman commissioned her to undertake a comprehensive review of the province's long-term care system. The review was published in May 2004 calling for more funding and inspections.

On October 30, 2007, following the provincial election, Premier Dalton McGuinty appointed Smith into cabinet as the province's Minister of Revenue. In a cabinet shuffle on September 18, 2008, Smith was appointed as the province's Minister of Tourism. On February 4, 2009, Smith was appointed Government House Leader. She continued as Minister of Tourism until she was appointed Minister of Intergovernmental Affairs in January 2010.

On November 19, 2010, Smith announced that she would not run in the 2011 election.

In August 2013, Premier Kathleen Wynne appointed Smith to represent the Government of Ontario at its office at the Canadian Embassy in Washington, DC.

On July 16, 2018, Conservative Premier Doug Ford withdrew Monique Smith from her position as the representative in a Washington, DC effective immediately.

=== Cabinet positions ===
McGuinty ministry, Province of Ontario (2003–2013)
Cabinet posts (4)
Predecessor	Office	Successor
Dalton McGuinty	Minister of Intergovernmental Affairs; 2010–2011	Dalton McGuinty
Peter Fonseca	Minister of Tourism; 2008–2010	Michael Chan
Michael Chan	Minister of Revenue; 2007–2008	Dwight Duncan
Special Parliamentary Responsibilities
Predecessor	Title	Successor
Michael Bryant	Government House Leader; 2009–2011	John Milloy

== After politics ==
On August 15, 2013, she was appointed by Premier Kathleen Wynne to run Ontario's office in the Canadian embassy in Washington.

== Electoral record ==
2007 Ontario general election
Party	Candidate	Votes	%	±%
Liberal	Monique Smith	13,730	41.94	-7.90
Progressive Conservative	Bill Vrebosch	13,373	40.85	-0.62
New Democratic	Henri Giroux	4,135	12.63	+5.40
Green	Amy Brownridge	1,258	3.84	+2.38
Family Coalition	Suzanne Plouffe	238	0.73	

2003 Ontario general election
Party	Candidate	Votes	%	±%
Liberal	Monique Smith	18,003	49.84	+6.70
Progressive Conservative	Al McDonald	14,978	41.47	-8.95
New Democratic	Terry O'Connor	2,613	7.23	+2.37
Green	Jaimie Board	528	1.46	+0.51
