= Arthur Allen Casselman =

Canadian politician

Ontario MPP
- In office 1943–1945
- Preceded by: Joseph Élie Cholette
- Succeeded by: Victor Martin
- Constituency: Nipissing

Personal details
- Born: November 2, 1902 Finch, Ontario, Canada
- Died: December 11, 1974 (aged 72) St. Thomas, Ontario, Canada
- Party: Ontario CCF
- Children: Verla Shaw

Arthur Allen Casselman (November 2, 1902 – December 11, 1974) was a Canadian politician, who represented the electoral district of Nipissing in the Legislative Assembly of Ontario from 1943 to 1945. He was a member of the Co-operative Commonwealth Federation (CCF). He was born in Finch, Ontario in 1902, the son of George S. Casselman.
