= Robert Carlin =

Canadian politician

Bob Carlin

Member of Provincial Parliament
- In office 1943–1948
- Preceded by: James Cooper
- Succeeded by: Welland Gemmell
- Constituency: Sudbury

Personal details
- Born: February 10, 1901 Buckingham, Quebec, Canada
- Died: October 22, 1991 (aged 90) Sudbury, Ontario, Canada
- Party: Ontario CCF
- Occupation: Labour organizer

Robert Hugh Carlin (February 10, 1901 – October 22, 1991) was a Canadian labour union organizer and politician, who represented the electoral district of Sudbury in the Legislative Assembly of Ontario from 1943 to 1948. He was a member of the Co-operative Commonwealth Federation (Ontario Section) (CCF).

Born in Buckingham, Quebec in 1901, Carlin moved to Cobalt in 1916 to work in the silver mines. He joined the Western Federation of Miners as a union representative, and was involved in the 1919 Cobalt Miners' Strike. He later began working at Teck Hughes in Kirkland Lake, but was fired in 1940 along with 36 other miners. He remained active as a union organizer, coordinating a major Labour Day demonstration against Teck Hughes in 1941.

He subsequently moved to Sudbury, where he became president of Mine Mill Local 598, and won election to the Legislative Assembly in the 1943 election and was re-elected in the 1945 election.

Following the 1945 election, the leadership of the CCF launched a purge of suspected Communists within the party and its supporters in the trade union movement attempted to eliminate suspected Communist influence in the union movement targeting, in particular, Mine Mill. National CCF secretary David Lewis and Charles Millard of the Canadian Congress of Labour decided to root the communists out of organized labour's decision-making bodies. Their first target was the CCF riding association in Sudbury, and its affiliated Mine Mill Local 598, even though the local was not under Communist control: out of 11,000 dues-paying members, very few were communists (less than 100). Over the next twenty years, a fierce battle was waged to take over Local 598 by Millard's United Steel Workers of America. Steel won.

Carlin was loyal to his union, Local 598, putting him in conflict with CCF establishment in both Toronto and Ottawa.

Charles Millard, Ontario CCF leader Ted Jolliffe, and David Lewis did not directly accuse Carlin of being a communist. Instead, they attacked him for not dealing with the perceived problem of communists in the Sudbury Mine Mill local. Local 598 was built by both Communists and CCFers, with the CCFers firmly in control of the executive. Carlin's first loyalty was to the men and women who helped build Local 598, regardless of their political affiliation. This is what got him in trouble with Lewis and Jolliffe. So Lewis and Jolliffe made the case to expel him from the Ontario CCF caucus at a special meeting of the CCF executive and the legislative caucus in Toronto on April 13, 1948. In essence, Carlin became a casualty of Steel's plans to raid Mine, Mill. The CCF lost the seat in the 1948 Ontario election, placing fourth to Welland Gemmell of the Progressive Conservatives. Carlin, running as an independent, finished a very close second. It wasn't until the CCF changed its name to the New Democratic Party (NDP) and the Mine Mill/Steelworkers war was over in 1967, that another social democratic candidate — Elie Martel in Sudbury East — was elected to the Legislative Assembly of Ontario from the city.

Carlin then stood as a Farmer-Labour candidate in the 1949 federal election in the federal riding of Sudbury, losing to Liberal candidate Léo Gauthier but placing ahead of Willard Evoy, the CCF candidate.

He subsequently returned to labour organizing in Sudbury, becoming a bargaining agent for the Steelworkers Local 6500 from 1962 until his retirement.

On May 27, 1978, he was awarded an honorary doctorate of laws degree by Laurentian University. The degree was awarded for his pioneering work in the early days of the union movement in Northern Ontario.

Carlin died in Sudbury at the age of 90.
