= Victor Martin (politician) =

Canadian politician

Ontario MPP
- In office 1945–1948
- Preceded by: Arthur Allen Casselman
- Succeeded by: William Bruce Harvey
- Constituency: Nipissing

Personal details
- Born: September 30, 1903 Bonfield, Ontario
- Died: December 26, 1950 (aged 47) Montreal, Quebec
- Party: Liberal
- Spouse: Beatrice Turcotte

Victor Martin (September 30, 1903 - December 26, 1950) was a Canadian politician who represented the electoral district of Nipissing in the Legislative Assembly of Ontario from 1945 to 1948. He was a member of the Ontario Liberal Party. He was born in 1903 to Ovide Martin and Marie Beaulieu. He married Beatrice Turcotte.

He died in 1950 and was buried at Bonfield.
