= James Cooper (Ontario politician) =

Canadian politician (1900–1979)

Jim Cooper

MPP for Sudbury
- In office 1937–1943
- Preceded by: Edmond Lapierre
- Succeeded by: Robert Carlin

Personal details
- Born: James Maxwell Cooper; June 17, 1900 Sudbury, Ontario
- Died: November 29, 1979 (aged 79) Sudbury, Ontario
- Party: Liberal
- Occupation: businessman

James Maxwell Cooper (June 17, 1900 – November 29, 1979) was a Canadian politician, who represented the electoral district of Sudbury in the Legislative Assembly of Ontario from 1937 to 1943. He was a member of the Ontario Liberal Party. He was born in Sudbury.

While in the Legislature, he was one of six Northern Ontario MPPs who absented themselves from a vote to censure the federal government for "not prosecuting the war with sufficient diligence".

Following his time in politics, he became an investor in the city's media; with coinvestors George Miller and Bill Plaunt, he purchased the Sudbury Star and radio station CKSO in 1950, and launched CKSO-TV in 1953. He died at a nursing home in 1979.
