= Zotique Mageau =

Canadian politician

Ontario MPP
- In office 1911–1926
- Preceded by: Azaire Adulphe Aubin
- Succeeded by: Théodore Legault
- Constituency: Sturgeon Falls

Personal details
- Born: April 6, 1865 Sainte-Julienne, Canada East
- Died: March 14, 1951 (aged 85) Sturgeon Falls, Ontario
- Party: Liberal
- Spouse(s): Saladine Serré (m. 1887-1911), Clara Perrault (m. 1912)
- Occupation: Businessman

Zotique Mageau (April 6, 1865 – March 14, 1951) was an Ontario merchant, notary and political figure. He represented Sturgeon Falls in the Legislative Assembly of Ontario as a Liberal member from 1911 to 1926.

He was born in Sainte-Julienne, Canada East, the youngest son of Fabien (Félix) Mageau and Judith Roy. In 1887, he married Saladine Serré; he married Clara Perrault in 1912 after her death. He opened a general store in Sturgeon Falls with his brother-in-law, Eugène Serré. He also established a lumber company, and was one of the founders of Sturgeon Falls, Ontario.
