= Gerry Monaghan =

Canadian politician (1915–1973)

MPP for Sudbury
- In office 1955–1959
- Preceded by: Welland Gemmell
- Succeeded by: Elmer Sopha

Personal details
- Born: Gerald Joseph Monaghan; February 27, 1915 Thurso, Quebec
- Died: June 2, 1973 (aged 58) Ottawa, Ontario
- Party: Progressive Conservative

Gerald Joseph Monaghan (February 27, 1915 – June 2, 1973) was a Canadian politician, who represented the electoral district of Sudbury in the Legislative Assembly of Ontario from 1955 until 1959. He was a member of the Ontario Progressive Conservative Party. He was born in Thurso, Quebec in 1915.

Prior to his election to the legislature, Monaghan was a city councillor in Sudbury. He died in 1973.
