= Nipissing West =

Former provincial electoral district in Ontario, Canada

Ontario electoral district

Defunct provincial electoral district
- Legislature: Legislative Assembly of Ontario
- District created: 1902
- District abolished: 1908
- First contested: 1902
- Last contested: 1905

Demographics
- Census division: Nipissing District
- Census subdivision(s): Sturgeon Falls, Sudbury

Nipissing West was a provincial electoral district in Ontario, Canada, active from 1902 to 1908.

Due to population growth, the district of Nipissing was divided into Nipissing West and Nipissing East for the 1902 election. By 1908, however, the town of Sudbury had grown enough to warrant its own electoral district. The electoral district of Sudbury was carved from Nipissing West that year, while the remainder of Nipissing West became the new district of Sturgeon Falls.

== Members of Provincial Parliament ==
Nipissing West
Assembly	Years	Member	Party
Created from Nipissing before the 1908 election
10th	1902–1904	Joseph Michaud	Liberal
11th	1905–1908	Azaire Adulphe Aubin	Conservative
Sourced from the Ontario Legislative Assembly
Split into Sudbury and Sturgeon Falls before the 1908 election

== Election results ==
1905 Ontario general election
Party	Candidate	Votes	%	±%
Conservative	Azaire Adulphe Aubin	1,533	58.62	+14.31
Liberal	Joseph Michaud	1,082	41.38	–14.31
Total valid votes		2,615	98.83	
Total rejected ballots		31	1.17	+0.10
Turnout		2,646	44.50	–6.76
Eligible voters		5,946		
Conservative gain from Liberal		Swing		+14.31
Source: Elections Ontario

1902 Ontario general election
Party	Candidate	Votes	%
Liberal	Joseph Michaud	1,185	55.69
Conservative	Francis Cochrane	943	44.31
Total valid votes		2,128	98.93
Total rejected ballots		23	1.07
Turnout		2,151	51.26
Eligible voters		4,196	
Liberal pickup new district.			
Source: Elections Ontario

== See also ==
- List of Ontario provincial electoral districts
- Canadian provincial electoral districts
