= Joseph Élie Cholette =

Canadian politician

Ontario MPP
- In office 1937–1943
- Preceded by: Joseph Marceau
- Succeeded by: Arthur Allen Casselman
- Constituency: Nipissing

Personal details
- Born: 1890; Sainte-Justine-de-Newton, Quebec, Canada
- Died: November 25, 1947 (aged 57); North Bay, Ontario, Canada
- Political party: Liberal

Joseph Élie Cholette (1890 – November 25, 1947) was a Canadian politician, who represented the electoral district of Nipissing in the Legislative Assembly of Ontario from 1937 to 1943. He was a member of the Ontario Liberal Party. He died in 1947.
