= Albert Zenophile Aubin =

Canadian politician

Albert Zénophile Aubin

Ontario MPP
- In office 1929–1934
- Preceded by: Théodore Legault
- Succeeded by: Riding abolished
- Constituency: Sturgeon Falls

Personal details
- Born: July 6, 1891 Cumber, Ontario
- Died: March 20, 1957 (aged 65) Riverside County, California
- Party: Conservative
- Spouse: Jeannette Bourdon

Albert Zénophile Aubin (July 6, 1891 – March 20, 1957) was an Ontario political figure. He represented Sturgeon Falls in the Legislative Assembly of Ontario from 1929 to 1934 as a Conservative member.

He was born in Cumber, Ontario, the son of Azaire Adulphe Aubin, and educated in Rigaud, Quebec and at Osgoode Hall. He married Jeannette Bourdon. Aubin lived in Sturgeon Falls. He died at Riverside County, California in 1957.
