= Jamie West =

Canadian politician

Jamie West MPP
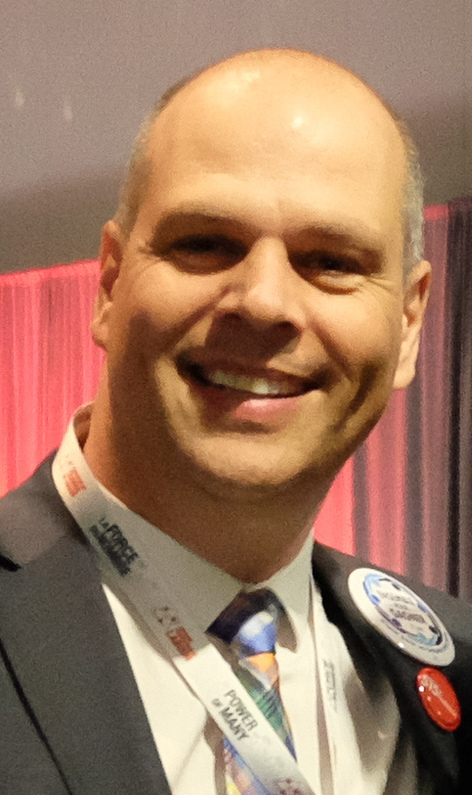
- West in 2019

Critic, Labour
- Incumbent
- Assumed office August 23, 2018
- Leader: Andrea Horwath

Member of the Ontario Provincial Parliament for Sudbury
- Incumbent
- Assumed office June 7, 2018
- Preceded by: Glenn Thibeault

Personal details
- Party: New Democratic
- Occupation: Smelter Worker Safety Representative, Flash Furnace Operator, Trade unionist, university professor

Jamie West is a Canadian politician and former steelworker. A member of the Ontario New Democratic Party, he has represented Sudbury in the Legislative Assembly of Ontario since 2018.

Prior to his election to the legislature, West worked for Vale Limited's smelter operation in Sudbury, and served as president of the Sudbury and District Labour Council. West also taught labour studies at Laurentian University.

== Political career ==
West was first elected to the Legislative Assembly of Ontario in the 2018 Ontario general election. During the 2018 election campaign, he was endorsed by United Steelworkers.

He was reelected in the 2022 Ontario general election. He won a third term in office in the 2025 election.

=== Tenure ===
In May 2023, West proposed Bill 118, which would designate June 1 as Injured Workers Day. The bill was passed in December 2024, making it one of only a small handful of opposition private member's bills that were successfully passed during the 43rd Parliament of Ontario.

In June 2024, West advocated for government funding for Hope Air; a charity that arranges medical transportation for low-income Canadians.

As of August 11, 2024, he serves as the Official Opposition critic for Labour, Training, and Skills Development.

In November 2024, West called on the provincial government to take stronger action against wage theft.

In 2026, West endorsed Rob Ashton in that year's federal NDP leadership race.

== Electoral record ==
2025 Ontario general election: Sudbury
Party	Candidate	Votes	%	±%	Expenditures
New Democratic	Jamie West	14,760	46.74	+5.89	$48,990
Progressive Conservative	Max Massimiliano	12,194	38.61	+9.64	$95,586
Liberal	Rashid Mukhtar Chaudhry	3,352	10.61	–8.86	$16,079
Green	David Robinson	748	2.37	–2.66	$525
New Blue	Brady Legault	421	1.33	–1.13	$0
Independent	J. David Popescu	106	0.34	+0.03	$130
Total valid votes/expense limit		31,581	95.14	–4.18	$107,942
Total rejected, unmarked, and declined ballots		1,613	4.86	+4.18	
Turnout		33,194	49.56	+4.96	
Eligible voters		66,973			
New Democratic hold		Swing		–1.88	
Source: Elections Ontario

2022 Ontario general election: Sudbury
Party	Candidate	Votes	%	±%	Expenditures
New Democratic	Jamie West	12,013	40.85	−7.22	$76,331
Progressive Conservative	Marc Despatie	8,519	28.97	+5.73	$66,299
Liberal	David Farrow	5,727	19.47	−2.95	$57,197
Green	David Robinson	1,480	5.03	+0.87	$23,082
New Blue	Sheldon Pressey	724	2.46		$8,572
Libertarian	Adrien Berthier	504	1.71	+1.13	$253
Ontario Party	Jason LaFace	353	1.20		$366
Independent	J. David Popescu	90	0.31		$146
Total valid votes/expense limit		29,410	99.32	+0.36	$95,253
Total rejected, unmarked, and declined ballots		203	0.68	-0.36	
Turnout		29,613	44.60	-9.62	
Eligible voters		68,036			
New Democratic hold		Swing		−6.48	
Source(s): "Summary of Valid Votes Cast for Each Candidate" (PDF). Elections Ontario. 2022. Archived from the original on 2023-05-18.; "Statistical Summary by Electoral District" (PDF). Elections Ontario. 2022. Archived from the original on 2023-05-21.

2018 Ontario general election: Sudbury
Party	Candidate	Votes	%	±%	Expenditures
New Democratic	Jamie West	17,386	48.07	+12.92	$26,455
Progressive Conservative	Troy Crowder	8,405	23.24	+15.73	$44,759
Liberal	Glenn Thibeault	8,108	22.42	-18.83	$97,933
Green	David Robinson	1,504	4.16	+0.92	$8,082
Consensus Ontario	Mila Chavez Wong	284	0.79	N/A	
Libertarian	James Wendler	212	0.59	N/A	
None of the Above	David Sylvestre	186	0.51	N/A	$0
Independent	J. David Popescu	82	0.23	+0.14	
Total valid votes		36,167	98.95	–0.50	
Total rejected, unmarked and declined ballots		382	1.05	+0.50	
Turnout		36,549	54.22	+14.53	
Eligible voters		67,410			
New Democratic gain from Liberal		Swing		-1.37	
Source: Elections Ontario
