= Elmer Sopha =

Canadian politician (1924–1982)

MPP for Sudbury
- In office 1959–1971
- Preceded by: Gerry Monaghan
- Succeeded by: Bud Germa

Personal details
- Born: April 18, 1924 Cobalt, Ontario, Canada
- Died: January 4, 1982 (aged 57) Phoenix, Arizona, U.S.
- Party: Liberal
- Occupation: lawyer

Elmer Walter Sopha, QC (April 18, 1924 – January 4, 1982) was a Canadian politician, who represented the electoral district of Sudbury in the Legislative Assembly of Ontario from 1959 to 1971. He was a member of the Ontario Liberal Party.

== Career ==
Sopha was born in Cobalt, Ontario. He served with the Royal Canadian Navy and attended the University of Toronto, receiving a Bachelor of Laws degree in 1953. Sopha was called to the bar two years later, and was named a Queen's Counsel in 1965.

He was first elected to the Ontario legislature in the 1959 provincial election, defeating his Progressive Conservative opponent by 3,143 votes. He was re-elected with a reduced majority in the 1963 election, and defeated Progressive Conservative Jim Gordon by only 540 votes in 1967.

Nicknamed "The Northern Gadfly" by the southern Ontario media, Sopha was considered one of the great orators in Ontario politics of his era. He was one of just two MPPs in the province, with caucus colleague Leo Troy, who voted against the adoption of the current Flag of Ontario. The Sudbury area has a large population of Franco-Ontarians among whom the flag was widely regarded as a symbol of British imperialism, and Sopha argued in the legislature that the flag was not an appropriate symbol of Ontario's cultural diversity.

Also in 1965, Sopha spoke out in the legislature against CBC news anchor Earl Cameron, for allegedly having compromised his objectivity by appearing in a toothpaste commercial.

Sopha strongly opposed Charles Templeton's bid for the Liberal Party leadership in 1966, following the resignation of Andy Thompson. He had been one of Templeton's strongest supporters in the 1964 Liberal leadership race and the only caucus member to have supported the broadcaster, but Sopha announced that his previous support of Templeton had been a serious mistake. It has been suggested that Sopha raised money for Templeton in 1964, which Templeton never acknowledged. Templeton declined to enter the contest, largely due to opposition from the party caucus.

Sopha did not stand in the 1971 campaign, and served on the governing body of the Law Society of Upper Canada from 1971 to 1975. He attempted a return to the legislature in the 1975 election, and lost to New Democratic Party (NDP) candidate Bud Germa by 2,278 votes. He tried again in the 1981 election, and lost to NDP candidate Floyd Laughren by 3,410 votes in Nickel Belt.

Sopha died suddenly while vacationing in Phoenix, Arizona on January 4, 1982. He was survived by his wife, a son (Mark), and four daughters (Lynn, Denise 'DeeDee', Lisa and Holly).
