= Leo Troy =

Canadian politician

Ontario MPP
- In office 1959–1965
- Preceded by: Jean Marc Chaput
- Succeeded by: Richard Smith
- Constituency: Nipissing

Personal details
- Born: October 29, 1894 Chatham, New Brunswick
- Died: June 26, 1965 (aged 70) Toronto, Ontario
- Party: Liberal
- Spouse: Grace Catherine Barker
- Children: 2
- Occupation: high school teacher

Military service
- Allegiance: Canadian
- Branch/service: Canadian Expeditionary Force
- Years of service: 1916-1919
- Rank: Lieutenant
- Unit: Cyclist Platoon

Martin Leo Troy (October 29, 1894 – June 26, 1965) was a Canadian politician, who represented the electoral district of Nipissing in the Legislative Assembly of Ontario from 1959 to 1965. He was a member of the Ontario Liberal Party.

Troy was born in Chatham, New Brunswick. On September 16, 1916, Troy enlisted in the Canadian Army and served in the Cyclist Platoon, Canadian Overseas Expeditionary Force. He served overseas from March 21, 1918, to March 1, 1919. He was promoted to the rank of Lieutenant and he received the British War Medal and the Victory Medal.

After the war, he moved to North Bay, Ontario, where he married Grace Catherine Barker in the Cathedrale l'Assomption on June 20, 1925. He taught English and physical education at the high school level at North Bay Collegiate Institute and Vocational School, where he was also Athletic Director, until his election to the legislature in 1959.

Troy re-enlisted during World War II and became a Commanding Officer in the Algonquin Regiment, with the rank of major.

Alongside caucus colleague Elmer Sopha, he was one of just two MPPs to vote against the adoption of the current Flag of Ontario.

He died in office in June 1965, days after undergoing emergency abdominal surgery.
