= Henri Morel (Canadian politician) =

Canadian politician and butcher

MPP for Nipissing
- In office 1908–1919
- Preceded by: first member
- Succeeded by: Joseph Marceau

MPP for Nipissing
- In office 1923–1930
- Preceded by: Joseph Marceau
- Succeeded by: Charles Robert Harrison

Personal details
- Born: July 21, 1867
- Died: June 24, 1934 (aged 66)
- Party: Conservative

Henri Morel (July 21, 1867 – 1934|) was an Ontario butcher and political figure. He represented Nipissing in the Legislative Assembly of Ontario from 1908 to 1919 and from 1923 to 1930 as a Conservative member. His name also appears as Henry Morel.

He was born in Rimouski, Quebec, the son of Xavier Morel, and educated in Arnprior, Ontario. In 1890, he married Alexina Bangs. He lived in Mattawa. Morel ran unsuccessfully for the Nipissing seat in the House of Commons in 1930. He died in 1934.
