= 2010 Nipissing District municipal elections =

- October 23, 2010

Elections were held in the organized municipalities in the Nipissing District of Ontario on October 25, 2010, in conjunction with municipal elections across the province.

== Bonfield ==
The election in Bonfield was won by Randall McLaren, a longtime member of the municipal council.

| Mayoral Candidate | Vote | % |
|---|---|---|
| Randall McLaren | 459 | 51.46 |
| Robert Dugard | 164 | 18.38 |
| Jules Gagne | 147 | 16.48 |
| John Houle | 122 | 13.68 |

== Calvin ==
Incumbent mayor Wayne Brown was re-elected in Calvin over challenger Rocky Edmonds.

| Mayoral Candidate | Vote | % |
|---|---|---|
| Wayne Brown (X) | 178 | 58.94 |
| Rocky Edmonds | 124 | 41.06 |

== Chisholm ==
Chisholm was one of a number of municipalities in the region whose mayors were acclaimed to office.

| Mayoral Candidate | Vote | % |
|---|---|---|
| Leo Jobin (X) | Acclaimed | |

== East Ferris ==
Incumbent mayor Bill Vrebosch was handily re-elected in East Ferris. All four incumbent councillors — Rick Champagne, Dan Corbeil, Terry Kelly and Robert Point — won by acclamation.

| Mayoral Candidate | Vote | % |
|---|---|---|
| Bill Vrebosch (X) | 1,288 | 85.58 |
| Stewart Miller | 217 | 14.42 |

== Mattawa ==
Incumbent mayor Dean Backer won re-election in Mattawa.

| Mayoral Candidate | Vote | % |
|---|---|---|
| Dean Backer (X) | 717 | |
| Garry Thibert | 322 | |

== Mattawan ==
No elections took place in the township of Mattawan, as the entire council was acclaimed into office.

| Mayoral Candidate | Vote | % |
|---|---|---|
| Peter Murphy (X) | Acclaimed | |

== North Bay ==
=== Mayor ===
Al McDonald, a former city councillor and MPP for the city of North Bay, was elected with nearly 87 per cent of the vote to succeed retiring mayor Vic Fedeli.

Mayoral race
| Candidate | Votes | % |
|---|---|---|
| Al McDonald | 13,708 | 86.62 |
| Valerie Chadbourne | 1,549 | 9.79 |
| Harvey Villneff | 569 | 3.60 |

=== City Council ===
All 10 members of North Bay City Council are elected at-large. As the top finisher in the city council election, Peter Chirico will serve as deputy mayor.

| Candidate | Vote | % |
|---|---|---|
| Peter Chirico (X) | 9,854 | 8.92 |
| Sean Lawlor | 9,745 | 8.82 |
| Tanya Vrebosch-Merry (X) | 7,520 | 6.81 |
| Dave Mendicino (X) | 7,082 | 6.41 |
| Chris Mayne (X) | 6,720 | 6.08 |
| Judy Koziol (X) | 6,529 | 5.91 |
| Mike Anthony (X) | 6,453 | 5.84 |
| Mac Bain (X) | 6,121 | 5.54 |
| George Maroosis | 5,737 | 5.19 |
| Daryl Vaillancourt (X) | 5,486 | 4.97 |
| Sarah Campbell (X) | 5,022 | 4.55 |
| Mark King | 4,902 | 4.44 |
| Tom "Timber" Graham (X) | 4,599 | 4.16 |
| Derek Shogren | 4,554 | 4.12 |
| Maureen Boldt | 3,492 | 3.16 |
| Craig Bridges | 3,457 | 3.13 |
| Sharon Langley | 2,504 | 2.27 |
| David Briggs | 2,059 | 1.86 |
| Trevor J. Jones | 1,872 | 1.69 |
| Timothy Gus Salidas | 1,854 | 1.68 |
| Jamie Lyle | 1,806 | 1.64 |
| Gilbert "Rocker" Gagnon | 890 | 0.81 |
| Mike Phillips | 722 | 0.65 |
| Clayton Windatt | 527 | 0.48 |
| BJ Szabicot | 503 | 0.46 |
| Michael Linkie | 445 | 0.40 |

== Papineau-Cameron ==
Papineau-Cameron was one of a number of municipalities in the region whose mayors were acclaimed to office.

| Mayoral Candidate | Vote | % |
|---|---|---|
| Robert Corriveau (X) | Acclaimed | |

== South Algonquin ==
South Algonquin was one of a number of municipalities in the region whose mayors were acclaimed to office.

| Mayoral Candidate | Vote | % |
|---|---|---|
| Jane Dumas | Acclaimed | |

== Temagami ==
Town clerk John Hodgson won the mayoralty of Temagami, defeating incumbent mayor Ike Laba and two other challengers. Sam Barnes, Lorie Hunter, Paul Middleton, Debby Burrows, Deborah Charyna and John Kenrick will serve on council.

| Mayoral Candidate | Vote | % |
|---|---|---|
| John Hodgson | 411 | 35.10 |
| Biff Lowery | 365 | 31.17 |
| George Leger | 207 | 17.68 |
| Ike Laba (X) | 188 | 16.05 |

== West Nipissing ==
West Nipissing was one of a number of municipalities in the region whose mayors were acclaimed to office. Denise Brisson, Guilles Tessier, Guy Fortier, Leo Malette, Don Fortin, Jamie Restoule, Paul Finley and Normand Roberge were elected to council.

| Mayoral Candidate | Vote | % |
|---|---|---|
| Joanne Savage (X) | Acclaimed | |
