= Joseph Marceau =

Canadian politician and contractor

J. Henri Marceau

Ontario MPP
- In office 1935–1937
- Preceded by: Théodore Legault
- Succeeded by: Joseph Élie Cholette
- In office 1919–1923
- Preceded by: Henri Morel
- Succeeded by: Henri Morel
- Constituency: Nipissing

Personal details
- Born: October 29, 1879; Pont-Rouge, Quebec, Canada
- Died: April 9, 1955 (aged 75); North Bay, Ontario, Canada
- Political party: Liberal
- Spouse: Elida Seguin
- Occupation: General contractor

Joseph Henri Marceau (October 29, 1879 – April 9, 1955) was an Ontario contractor and political figure. He represented Nipissing in the Legislative Assembly of Ontario from 1919 to 1923 and from 1935 to 1937 as a Liberal member.

He was born in Pont-Rouge, Quebec, the son of Hypolite Marceau, and was educated in North Bay, Ontario. In 1900, he married Elida Seguin. Marceau was a general contractor and was also involved in the timber trade. He also served as a member of the town council for North Bay from 1909 to 1912. Marceau was an unsuccessful candidate for a seat in the provincial assembly in 1914. He was elected for a second time in a 1935 by-election held after the death of Théodore Legault. He died in 1955 and was buried at St. Marys Roman Catholic Cemetery in Nipissing.

== Sources ==
- Canadian Parliamentary Guide, 1922, EJ Chambers
