= Azaire Adulphe Aubin =

Canadian politician

Azaire Adolphe Aubin

Ontario MPP
- In office 1908–1911
- Preceded by: Riding created
- Succeeded by: Zotique Mageau
- Constituency: Sturgeon Falls
- In office 1905–1908
- Preceded by: Joseph Michaud
- Succeeded by: Riding abolished
- Constituency: Nipissing West

Personal details
- Born: August 6, 1850 Saint-Anicet, Huntingdon County, Canada East
- Died: March 27, 1932 (aged 81)
- Party: Conservative
- Spouse: Louise Dumouchel (m. 1886)

Azaire Adolphe Aubin (August 6, 1850 – March 27, 1932) was an Ontario political figure. He represented Nipissing West and then Sturgeon Falls in the Legislative Assembly of Ontario as a Conservative member from 1905 to 1911.

He was born in Saint-Anicet, Huntingdon County, Canada East, the son of J. Aubin and educated in Montreal. In 1886, he married Louise Dumouchel. He died in 1932. He is buried at the Old St Mary's Roman Catholic Cemetery at Sturgeon Falls.

His son Albert Zénophile later served in the provincial assembly.
