= Richard Smith (Canadian politician) =

Canadian politician

Dick Smith

Ontario MPP
- In office 1966–1977
- Preceded by: Leo Troy
- Succeeded by: Mike Bolan
- Constituency: Nipissing

Personal details
- Born: June 20, 1931; North Bay, Ontario
- Died: October 8, 1978 (aged 47); Toronto, Ontario
- Political party: Liberal

Richard "Dick" Stanley Smith (June 20, 1931 – October 8, 1978) was the Liberal MPP for Nipissing in Ontario from 1966 to 1977.

He died of a heart condition at a hospital on October 8, 1978, aged 47. His daughter, Monique Smith, represented the riding from 2003 to 2011.
