= William Bruce Harvey =

Canadian politician

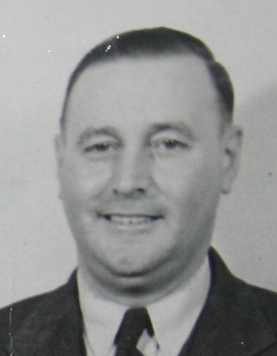

Ontario MPP
- In office 1948–1954
- Preceded by: Victor Martin
- Succeeded by: Jean Marc Chaput
- Constituency: Nipissing

Personal details
- Born: June 2, 1907 Rutherglen, Scotland
- Died: March 1, 1954 (aged 46)
- Party: Progressive Conservative
- Spouse: Eva Belle Moore
- Occupation: Businessman

William Bruce Harvey (June 2, 1907 – March 1, 1954) was a Canadian politician, who represented the electoral district of Nipissing in the Legislative Assembly of Ontario from 1948 to 1954. He was a member of the Ontario Progressive Conservative Party.

== Background ==
He was born to Isabella Gibson (1878–1948) and Robert Harvie (1874–1929) in Rutherglen, Lanarkshire, Scotland on June 2, 1907. In 1912, Robert and his oldest child Mary, sailed for Canada and settled in the Ottawa area. In June 1913, Isabella and William, along with three other siblings (Katie, Isabella and Jessie) sailed to Canada on the Teutonic and joined Robert and Mary in Ottawa. The purser of the Teutonic spelled the surname incorrectly and the family retained the new spelling of Harvey since all immigration documents used the ship's registry information.

William Harvey spent his teenage years in Ottawa. He moved to North Bay in 1923 to open a Keyes Supply Company office.

His younger brother Bruce Harvey remained in Ottawa and was an alderman from 1961–1969, representing Elmdale-Victoria Ward, and working with Charlotte Whitton from 1960-64.

Harvey met and married Eva Belle Moore (1907–1970) on June 3, 1929. They had three children: Edith Joan (1932–1996), Robert Walter (1934-2019) and Isabel Dianne (1936–1992). He was a commercial traveller and active member of the Canadian Travellers Association (CTA) and the Masonic Shrine Temple, North Bay Lodge #617.

In 1940 he went into business for himself, and partnered with Don Seal to open Harvey Seal Motors (Mercury dealership) in 1942 located at Main Street West.

== Politics ==
Harvey was elected councillor for West Ferris Township, Ontario and served for 4 years before he entered the provincial political arena.

He was elected as a Progressive Conservative MPP on June 7, 1948 and served the majority of his office in the government of Leslie Frost. He was appointed Vice Chairman of the Ontario Northland Transportation Commission in 1949 as well as Industrial Commissioner for Northern Ontario. The city of North Bay named Harvey Street and Harvey Street School in his honour.

Harvey was re-elected to the provincial legislature in 1951 and served until his death on March 1, 1954.
