= Welland Gemmell =

Canadian politician (1910–1954)

MPP for Sudbury
- In office June 7, 1948 – June 18, 1954
- Preceded by: Robert Carlin
- Succeeded by: Gerry Monaghan

Personal details
- Born: October 10, 1910 Sudbury, Ontario, Canada
- Died: June 18, 1954 (aged 43) North Bay, Ontario, Canada
- Party: Progressive Conservative

Welland Stewart Gemmell (October 10, 1910 – June 18, 1954) was a Canadian politician, who represented the electoral district of Sudbury in the Legislative Assembly of Ontario from 1948 until his death in 1954.

A member of the Ontario Progressive Conservative Party, Gemmell won the riding in the 1948 election, following a rift in the Sudbury area's labour movement which resulted in vote splitting between incumbent MPP Robert Carlin and a new CCF candidate.

Gemmell was appointed to the cabinet of Leslie Frost, serving as Minister of Mines from May 4, 1949 to June 3, 1952, and thereafter as Minister of Lands and Forests until June 18, 1954. He died of a heart attack at a hotel in North Bay on June 18, 1954.

A byelection was not called to replace Gemmell following his death; the Sudbury riding instead remained vacant until it was won by Gerry Monaghan in the 1955 provincial election.
