= Mike Bolan =

Canadian politician

Ontario MPP
- In office 1977–1981
- Preceded by: Dick Smith
- Succeeded by: Mike Harris
- Constituency: Nipissing

Personal details
- Born: October 10, 1933; North Bay, Ontario
- Died: October 23, 2016 (aged 83); North Bay, Ontario
- Political party: Liberal
- Occupation: Lawyer, judge

Michael George Bolan (October 10, 1933 – October 23, 2016) was a politician in Ontario, Canada. He was a Liberal of the Legislative Assembly of Ontario from 1977 to 1981 who represented the riding of Nipissing.

== Background ==
Bolan was born in Cobalt, Ontario. He practiced law in North Bay, Ontario after his call to the bar. He served as a school trustee and city councillor in North Bay. From 1977 to 1981, Bolan represented Nipissing in the Ontario Legislature. In 1981, Bolan was appointed county court judge in Brampton, Ontario. He later became senior judge in Kitchener, Ontario. He transferred to the Superior Court in North Bay where he ended his judicial career in 2008.

Bolan was named honorary colonel of The Algonquin Regiment. He died in North Bay on October 23, 2016.

== Politics ==
In the 1977 provincial election, Bolan ran as the Liberal candidate in the riding of Nipissing. He defeated his Progressive Conservative opponent and was elected. He served for four years in the opposition benches. In the 1981 election he was defeated by Mike Harris by 4,871 votes under a general drift towards the PC party.
