= Sturgeon Falls (electoral district) =

Former provincial electoral district in Ontario, Canada

Ontario electoral district

Defunct provincial electoral district
- Legislature: Legislative Assembly of Ontario
- District created: 1908
- District abolished: 1934
- First contested: 1908
- Last contested: 1929

Demographics
- Census division: Nipissing District
- Census subdivision: Sturgeon Falls

Sturgeon Falls was a provincial electoral district in Ontario, Canada, active from 1908 to 1934. The district was created when the former district of Nipissing West was divided into Sturgeon Falls and Sudbury for the 1908 election. It was merged into Nipissing in 1934.

== Members of Provincial Parliament ==
Sturgeon Falls
| Assembly | Years | Member | Party |
|---|---|---|---|
| 12th | 1908–1911 | Azaire Adulphe Aubin | Conservative |
| 13th | 1911–1914 | Zotique Mageau | Liberal |
| 14th | 1914–1919 | Zotique Mageau | Liberal |
| 15th | 1919–1923 | Zotique Mageau | Liberal |
| 16th | 1923–1926 | Zotique Mageau | Liberal |
| 17th | 1926–1929 | Théodore Legault | Liberal |
| 18th | 1929–1934 | Albert Zenophile Aubin | Conservative |
Sourced from the Ontario Legislative Assembly

== Election results ==
1929 Ontario general election
| Party | Candidate | Votes | % | ±% |
|---|---|---|---|---|
| Conservative | Albert Zenophile Aubin | 3,051 | 58.92 | +12.14 |
| Liberal | Théodore Legault | 2,127 | 41.08 | –8.19 |
| Total valid votes | | 5,178 | 99.35 | |
| Total rejected ballots | | 34 | 0.65 | +0.20 |
| Turnout | | 5,212 | 67.64 | +16.67 |
| Eligible voters | | 7,705 | | |
| Conservative gain from Independent Liberal | | Swing | | +10.16 |
Source: Elections Ontario

1926 Ontario general election
| Party | Candidate | Votes | % | ±% |
|---|---|---|---|---|
| Independent Liberal | Théodore Legault | 2,043 | 49.26 | – |
| Conservative | Albert Zenophile Aubin | 1,940 | 46.78 | +32.46 |
| Progressive | Alfred Limoges | 164 | 3.95 | – |
| Total valid votes | | 4,147 | 99.54 | |
| Total rejected ballots | | 19 | 0.46 | +0.46 |
| Turnout | | 4,166 | 50.97 | – |
| Eligible voters | | 8,173 | | |
| Independent Liberal gain from Liberal | | Swing | | –16.23 |
Source: Elections Ontario

1923 Ontario general election
| Party | Candidate | Votes | % | ±% |
|---|---|---|---|---|
| Liberal | Zotique Mageau | 2,671 | 62.32 | +0.29 |
| United Farmers | William G. Daoust | 1,001 | 23.36 | +5.95 |
| Conservative | G. I. Bull | 614 | 14.33 | –6.24 |
| Total valid votes | | 4,286 | 100.00 | |
| Total rejected ballots | | – | | |
| Turnout | | 4,286 | – | – |
| Eligible voters | | | | |
| Liberal hold | | Swing | | –2.83 |
Source: Elections Ontario

1919 Ontario general election
| Party | Candidate | Votes | % | ±% |
|---|---|---|---|---|
| Liberal | Zotique Mageau | 2,690 | 62.02 | –13.63 |
| Conservative | Azaire Adulphe Aubin | 892 | 20.57 | –3.78 |
| United Farmers | Alphonse Legendre | 755 | 17.41 | – |
| Total valid votes | | 4,337 | 96.94 | |
| Total rejected ballots | | 137 | 3.06 | +2.65 |
| Turnout | | 4,474 | 67.33 | –9.43 |
| Eligible voters | | 6,645 | | |
| Liberal hold | | Swing | | –4.92 |
Source: Elections Ontario

1914 Ontario general election
| Party | Candidate | Votes | % | ±% |
|---|---|---|---|---|
| Liberal | Zotique Mageau | 1,650 | 75.65 | +21.12 |
| Conservative | Andrew Robert Martin | 531 | 24.35 | –21.12 |
| Total valid votes | | 2,181 | 99.59 | |
| Total rejected ballots | | 9 | 0.41 | +0.04 |
| Turnout | | 2,190 | 76.76 | +10.33 |
| Eligible voters | | 2,853 | | |
| Liberal hold | | Swing | | +21.12 |
Source: Elections Ontario

1911 Ontario general election
| Party | Candidate | Votes | % | ±% |
|---|---|---|---|---|
| Liberal | Zotique Mageau | 885 | 54.53 | +7.45 |
| Conservative | Azaire Adulphe Aubin | 738 | 45.47 | –7.45 |
| Total valid votes | | 1,623 | 99.63 | |
| Total rejected ballots | | 6 | 0.37 | –0.02 |
| Turnout | | 1,629 | 66.44 | –15.98 |
| Eligible voters | | 2,452 | | |
| Liberal gain from Conservative | | Swing | | +7.45 |
Source: Elections Ontario

1908 Ontario general election
| Party | Candidate | Votes | % |
|---|---|---|---|
| Conservative | Azaire Adulphe Aubin | 959 | 52.92 |
| Liberal | Alfred Limoges | 853 | 47.08 |
| Total valid votes | | 1,812 | 99.62 |
| Total rejected ballots | | 7 | 0.38 |
| Turnout | | 1,819 | 82.42 |
| Eligible voters | | 2,207 | |
| Conservative pickup new district. | | | |
Source: Elections Ontario

== See also ==
- List of Ontario provincial electoral districts
- Canadian provincial electoral districts
