= Charles Lamarche =

Canadian politician

MPP for Nipissing East
- In office January 25 – May 27, 1905
- Preceded by: Michael James
- Succeeded by: Francis Cochrane

Personal details
- Born: July 17, 1850 Ottawa, Canada West
- Died: December 25, 1909 (aged 59) Sudbury, Ontario
- Party: Conservative
- Spouse(s): Harriet Victoria McQuestion (m 1878)

Charles Lamarche (July 17, 1850 – December 25, 1909) was a Canadian politician, who represented the electoral district of Nipissing East in the Legislative Assembly of Ontario in 1905.

A member of the Conservative Party, he was elected in the 1905 election. However, after only a few months in office he resigned to open a seat for Francis Cochrane, who had been appointed Minister of Lands, Forests and Mines in the government of James P. Whitney, to enter the legislature in a by-election. Following his resignation from the legislature, he was appointed as registrar of deeds for the Nipissing District.

He was sued in 1908 by Henry Draney, a mining prospector whose registration of a mining claim in Cobalt had been rejected. Draney's lawsuit claimed that Lamarche had promised to make his resignation from the legislature conditional on the approval of Draney's claim.

He died in Sudbury in December 1909.
