= Sudbury and District Labour Council =

Canadian trade union

The Sudbury and District Labour Council (SDLC) is based in Greater Sudbury, Ontario, Canada. It has been affiliated with the Canadian Labour Congress since 1957.

They co-host an annual Day of Mourning witk the Centre for Research in Occupational Safety and Health, and partnered with the United Way to initiate the Period Promise drive.

The current SDLC president is Jessica Montgomery.
