= Jean Marc Chaput =

Canadian politician

Ontario MPP
- In office 1954–1959
- Preceded by: William Bruce Harvey
- Succeeded by: Leo Troy
- Constituency: Nipissing

Personal details
- Born: October 26, 1910 Mattawa, Ontario
- Died: 1974 (aged 63–64)
- Party: Progressive Conservative
- Occupation: Hotelier

Jean Marc Vantelli Chaput (October 26, 1910 – July 20, 1974) was a Canadian politician who represented the electoral district of Nipissing in the Legislative Assembly of Ontario from 1954 to 1959. He was a member of the Progressive Conservative Party of Ontario.

Chaput was born in Mattawa, Ontario, to Frederic Chaput and Hermanie Nadon. Prior to being elected, Chaput owned and operated a hotel in North Bay.
