= Sudbury (provincial electoral district) =

Provincial electoral district in Ontario, Canada

Coordinates: 46.575°N 80.912°W

Ontario electoral district
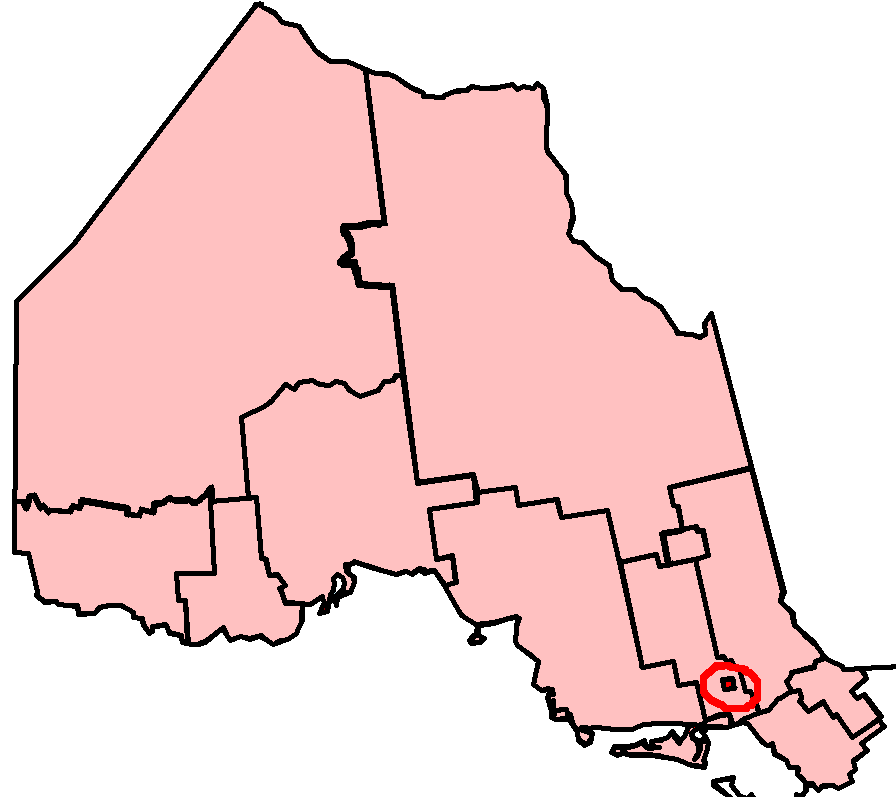

Provincial electoral district
- Legislature: Legislative Assembly of Ontario
MPP
Jamie West
New Democratic
- District created: 1905
- First contested: 1908
- Last contested: 2025

Demographics
- Population (2016): 80,840
- Electors (2018): 67,410
- Area (km²): 158
- Pop. density (per km²): 511.6
- Census division: Greater Sudbury

Sudbury is a provincial electoral district in Ontario, Canada, that has been represented in the Legislative Assembly of Ontario since 1908. It is one of the two districts serving the city of Greater Sudbury. Its population in 2001 was 89,443.

Sudbury was given its own riding provincially in the 1908 election, when the former riding of Nipissing West was divided into Sudbury and Sturgeon Falls. It initially included a large portion of the Sudbury District; in 1952, the boundaries were narrowed significantly to include only the city of Sudbury, the geographic township of McKim and the town of Copper Cliff. The rest of the original Sudbury riding was incorporated into the new riding of Nickel Belt. The riding of Sudbury East was additionally created in 1967.

Federally, however, the city remained part of the Nipissing electoral district until 1947.

== Geography ==
Sudbury electoral district consists of the part of the city of Greater Sudbury bounded on the west and south by the Greater Sudbury city limits, and on the north and east by a line drawn from the western city limit of Greater Sudbury east along the northern limit of the former Town of Walden, north, east and south along the limits of the former city of Sudbury, west along Highway 69 and Regent Street, south along Long Lake Road, west along the northern boundary of the township of Broder, southwest along Kelly Lake, and south along the eastern limit of the former Town of Walden to the southern city limit of Greater Sudbury.

== Demographics ==
According to the 2022 Canadian census

Ethnic groups: 87.9% White, 8.4% Aboriginal
Languages: 65.3% English, 23.6% French
Religions: 77.3% Christian (55.6% Catholic, 5.4% United Church, 4.3% Anglican, 1.7% Lutheran, 1.5% Baptist, 1.3% Pentecostal, 1.2% Presbyterian, 6.3% other Christian), 20.8% no religion

== History ==
The provincial electoral district was first contested in the 1908 election. Prior to its creation, the town of Sudbury was part of the district of Nipissing West.

In 1996, Ontario was divided into the same electoral districts as those used for federal electoral purposes. They were redistributed whenever a readjustment took place at the federal level.

In 2005, legislation was passed by the Legislature to divide Ontario into 107 electoral districts, beginning with the next provincial election in 2007. The eleven northern electoral districts are those defined for federal purposes in 1996, based on the 1991 census (except for a minor boundary adjustment). The 96 southern electoral districts are those defined for federal electoral purposes in 2003, based on the 2001 census. Without this legislation, the number of electoral districts in northern Ontario would have been reduced from eleven to ten.

=== Members of the Legislative Assembly/Members of Provincial Parliament ===
This riding has elected the following members of the Legislative Assembly of Ontario:

Sudbury
Assembly	Years	Member	Party
Riding created from Nipissing West
12th	1908–1911	Francis Cochrane	Conservative
13th	1911–1914	Charles McCrea	Conservative
14th	1914–1919	Charles McCrea	Conservative
15th	1919–1923	Charles McCrea	Conservative
16th	1923–1926	Charles McCrea	Conservative
17th	1926–1929	Charles McCrea	Conservative
18th	1929–1934	Charles McCrea	Conservative
19th	1934–1937	Edmond Lapierre	Liberal
20th	1937–1943	James Cooper	Liberal
21st	1943–1945	Robert Carlin	Co-operative Commonwealth
22nd	1945–1948	Robert Carlin	Co-operative Commonwealth
23rd	1948–1951	Welland Gemmell	Progressive Conservative
24th	1951–1954†	Welland Gemmell	Progressive Conservative
25th	1955–1959	Gerry Monaghan	Progressive Conservative
26th	1959–1963	Elmer Sopha	Liberal
27th	1963–1967	Elmer Sopha	Liberal
28th	1967–1971	Elmer Sopha	Liberal
29th	1971–1975	Bud Germa	New Democratic
30th	1975–1977	Bud Germa	New Democratic
31st	1977–1981	Bud Germa	New Democratic
32nd	1981–1985	Jim Gordon	Progressive Conservative
33rd	1985–1987	Jim Gordon	Progressive Conservative
34th	1987–1990	Sterling Campbell	Liberal
35th	1990–1995	Sharon Murdock	New Democratic
36th	1995–1998	Rick Bartolucci	Liberal
37th	1999–2003	Rick Bartolucci	Liberal
38th	2003–2007	Rick Bartolucci	Liberal
39th	2007–2011	Rick Bartolucci	Liberal
40th	2011–2014	Rick Bartolucci	Liberal
41st	2014–2014	Joe Cimino	New Democratic
41st	2015–2018	Glenn Thibeault	Liberal
42nd	2018–2022	Jamie West	New Democratic
43rd	2022–2025	Jamie West	New Democratic
44th	2025–present	Jamie West	New Democratic

== Election results ==
Winning party in each polling division of Sudbury at the 2025 Ontario general election

2025 Ontario general election
Party	Candidate	Votes	%	±%	Expenditures
New Democratic	Jamie West	14,760	46.74	+5.89	$48,990
Progressive Conservative	Max Massimiliano	12,194	38.61	+9.65	$95,586
Liberal	Rashid Mukhtar Choudhry	3,352	10.61	–8.86	$16,079
Green	David Robinson	748	2.37	–2.66	$525
New Blue	Brady Legault	421	1.33	–1.13	$0
Independent	J. David Popescu	106	0.34	+0.03	$130
Total valid votes/expense limit		31,581	99.36	–	$107,942
Total rejected, unmarked and declined ballots		203	0.64	–0.05	
Turnout		31,784	47.41	+2.81	
Eligible voters		67,045			
New Democratic hold		Swing		–1.88	
Source: Elections Ontario

Winning party in each polling division of Sudbury at the 2022 Ontario general election

2022 Ontario general election
Party	Candidate	Votes	%	±%	Expenditures
New Democratic	Jamie West	12,013	40.85	–7.22	$76,331
Progressive Conservative	Marc Despatie	8,519	28.97	+5.73	$66,299
Liberal	David Farrow	5,727	19.47	–2.95	$57,197
Green	David Robinson	1,480	5.03	+0.87	$23,082
New Blue	Sheldon Pressey	724	2.46	–	$8,572
Libertarian	Adrien Berthier	504	1.71	+1.13	$253
Ontario Party	Jason Laface	353	1.20	–	$366
Independent	J. David Popescu	90	0.31	+0.08	$146
Total valid votes/expense limit		29,410	99.31	–	$95,253
Total rejected, unmarked and declined ballots		203	0.69	–0.36	
Turnout		29,613	44.60	–9.62	
Eligible voters		66,394			
New Democratic hold		Swing		–6.48	
Source: Elections Ontario

2018 Ontario general election
Party	Candidate	Votes	%	±%	Expenditures
New Democratic	Jamie West	17,386	48.07	+12.92	$26,455
Progressive Conservative	Troy Crowder	8,405	23.24	+15.73	$44,759
Liberal	Glenn Thibeault	8,108	22.42	–18.83	$97,933
Green	David Robinson	1,504	4.16	+0.91	$8,082
Consensus Ontario	Mila Chavez Wong	284	0.79	–	–
Libertarian	James Wendler	212	0.59	–	–
None of the Above	David Sylvestre	186	0.51	–	$0
Independent	J. David Popescu	82	0.23	+0.13	–
Total valid votes		36,167	98.95		
Total rejected, unmarked and declined ballots		382	1.05	+0.49	
Turnout		36,549	54.22	+14.53	
Eligible voters		67,410			
New Democratic gain from Liberal		Swing		–1.40	
Source: Elections Ontario

Ontario provincial by-election, February 5, 2015 Resignation of Joe Cimino
Party	Candidate	Votes	%	±%
Liberal	Glenn Thibeault	10,640	41.25	+1.90
New Democratic	Suzanne Shawbonquit	9,067	35.15	–7.09
Independent	Andrew Olivier	3,183	12.34	–27.01
Progressive Conservative	Paula Peroni	1,937	7.51	–6.29
Green	David Robinson	837	3.24	–0.34
People's Political Party	Jean-Raymond Audet	39	0.15	–
Pauper	John Turmel	25	0.10	–
Independent	J. David Popescu	24	0.09	–0.22
Independent	Ed Pokonzie	22	0.09	–
Independent	James Waddell	21	0.08	–
Total valid votes		25,795	99.45	
Total rejected, unmarked and declined ballots		143	0.55	–0.56
Turnout		25,938	39.69	–12.23
Eligible voters		65,356		
Liberal gain from New Democratic		Swing		+4.50
Independent candidate Andrew Olivier lost 27.00 percentage points from the 2014 election, when he ran as a Liberal.
Source: Elections Ontario

2014 Ontario general election
Party	Candidate	Votes	%	±%
New Democratic	Joe Cimino	14,274	42.24	+1.51
Liberal	Andrew Olivier	13,296	39.35	–3.02
Progressive Conservative	Paula Peroni	4,663	13.80	+0.23
Green	Casey J. Lalonde	1,212	3.59	+0.90
Libertarian	Steve Wilson	243	0.72	–
Independent	J. David Popescu	105	0.31	+0.17
Total valid votes		33,793	98.89	
Total rejected, unmarked and declined ballots		380	1.11	+0.77
Turnout		34,173	51.92	+1.98
Eligible voters		65,819		
New Democratic gain from Liberal		Swing		+2.27
Source: Elections Ontario

2011 Ontario general election
Party	Candidate	Votes	%	±%	Expenditures
Liberal	Rick Bartolucci	13,735	42.37	–16.40	$75,799.82
New Democratic	Paul Loewenberg	13,204	40.73	+13.60	$63,442.20
Progressive Conservative	Gerry Labelle	4,400	13.57	+5.64	$28,741.21
Green	Pat Rogerson	870	2.68	–2.21	$8,357.73
Family Coalition	Carita Murphy Marketos	164	0.51	–0.39	$325.70
Independent	J. David Popescu	44	0.14	–0.24	$359.01
Total valid votes/expense limit		32,417	99.66	–	$77,509.46
Total rejected, unmarked and declined ballots		112	0.34	–0.26	
Turnout		32,529	49.94	–1.17	
Eligible voters		65,130			
Liberal hold		Swing		–15.00	
Source: Elections Ontario

2007 Ontario general election
Party	Candidate	Votes	%	±%	Expenditures
Liberal	Rick Bartolucci	19,307	58.77	–10.21	$65,502.20
New Democratic	Dave Battaino	8,914	27.13	+13.13	$38,488.63
Progressive Conservative	Louis Delongchamp	2,605	7.93	–6.26	$12,594.00
Green	David Sylvestre	1,608	4.89	+2.07	$1,520.11
Family Coalition	Carita Murphy-Marketos	293	0.89	–	$3,118.15
Independent	J. David Popescu	124	0.38	–	$17.90
Total valid votes/expense limit		32,851	99.39	–	$69,838.20
Total rejected, unmarked and declined ballots		201	0.61	–0.15	
Turnout		33,052	51.11	–4.84	
Eligible voters		64,665			
Liberal hold		Swing		–11.67	
Source: Elections Ontario

2003 Ontario general election
Party	Candidate	Votes	%	±%	Expenditures
Liberal	Rick Bartolucci	24,631	68.98	+10.27	$58,280.81
Progressive Conservative	Mila Wong	5,068	14.19	–15.38	$34,319.74
New Democratic	Harvey Wyers	4,999	14.00	+3.49	$16,359.88
Green	Luke Norton	1,009	2.83	–	$508.44
Total valid votes/expense limit		35,707	99.24	–	$61,731.84
Total rejected, unmarked and declined ballots		274	0.76	+0.10	
Turnout		35,981	55.95	+0.26	
Eligible voters		64,304			
Liberal hold		Swing		+12.83	
Source: Elections Ontario

1999 Ontario general election
Party	Candidate	Votes	%	±%	Expenditures
Liberal	Rick Bartolucci	21,732	58.71	+18.05	$52,531.80
Progressive Conservative	Mila Wong	10,948	29.58	+2.93	$61,776.00
New Democratic	Paul Chislett	3,891	10.51	–18.12	Not Available
Natural Law	Bernard Fram	184	0.50	–0.54	$0.00
Independent	Ed Pokonzie	159	0.43	+0.02	Not Available
Independent	J. David Popescu	103	0.28	–	$123.60
Total valid votes/expense limit		37,017	99.34	–	$64,227.84
Total rejected, unmarked and declined ballots		245	0.66	–0.66	
Turnout		37,262	55.69	–6.41	
Eligible voters		66,904			
Liberal hold		Swing		+7.56	
Source: Elections Ontario

1995 Ontario general election
Party	Candidate	Votes	%	±%	Expenditures
Liberal	Rick Bartolucci	12,349	40.66	+9.88	$38,419.00
New Democratic	Sharon Murdock	8,698	28.64	–12.58	$45,265.43
Progressive Conservative	Richard Zanibbi	8,093	26.64	+16.44	$43,588.00
Independent	Don Scott	506	1.67	–	$459.00
Natural Law	David Gordon	315	1.04	–	$0.00
Green	Lewis Poulin	290	0.95	–	$69.68
Independent	Ed Pokonzie	123	0.40	–	$0.00
Total valid votes/expense limit		30,374	98.68	–	$46,140.00
Total rejected, unmarked and declined ballots		405	1.32	+0.37	
Turnout		30,779	62.10	–4.47	
Eligible voters		49,562			
Liberal gain from New Democratic		Swing		+11.23	
Source: Elections Ontario

1990 Ontario general election
Party	Candidate	Votes	%	±%
New Democratic	Sharon Murdock	13,407	41.21	+12.71
Liberal	Sterling Campbell	10,010	30.77	–8.59
Confederation of Regions	Billie Christiansen	5,795	17.81	–
Progressive Conservative	Mike Franceschini	3,318	10.20	–21.06
Total valid votes		32,530	99.05	
Total rejected, unmarked and declined ballots		311	0.95	+0.51
Turnout		32,841	66.57	–0.75
Eligible voters		49,330		
New Democratic gain from Liberal		Swing		+10.65
Source: Elections Ontario

1987 Ontario general election
Party	Candidate	Votes	%	±%
Liberal	Sterling Campbell	12,788	39.36	+15.03
Progressive Conservative	Jim Gordon	10,158	31.26	–17.34
New Democratic	Sharon Murdock	9,260	28.50	+1.44
Independent	Ted I. McKeown	285	0.88	–
Total valid votes		32,491	99.56	
Total rejected ballots		142	0.44	–0.32
Turnout		32,633	67.32	+6.78
Eligible voters		48,471		
Liberal gain from Progressive Conservative		Swing		+16.19
Source: Elections Ontario

1985 Ontario general election
Party	Candidate	Votes	%	±%
Progressive Conservative	Jim Gordon	12,591	48.61	+2.66
New Democratic	Ernie St. Jean	7,010	27.06	–3.66
Liberal	Chris Nash	6,302	24.33	+1.44
Total valid votes		25,903	99.25	
Total rejected ballots		197	0.75	+0.11
Turnout		26,100	60.54	–2.09
Eligible voters		43,112		
Progressive Conservative hold		Swing		+3.16
Source: Elections Ontario

1981 Ontario general election
Party	Candidate	Votes	%	±%
Progressive Conservative	Jim Gordon	12,043	45.95	+14.18
New Democratic	Bud Germa	8,052	30.72	–10.90
Liberal	Jim Marchbank	5,998	22.89	–2.49
Communist	Richard Orlandini	115	0.44	–0.80
Total valid votes		26,208	99.35	
Total rejected ballots		171	0.65	+0.09
Turnout		26,379	62.63	+0.36
Eligible voters		42,119		
Progressive Conservative gain from New Democratic		Swing		+12.54
Source: Elections Ontario

1977 Ontario general election
Party	Candidate	Votes	%	±%
New Democratic	Bud Germa	11,117	41.62	+3.27
Progressive Conservative	Peter Crossgrove	8,485	31.77	+1.89
Liberal	Gaetan Doucet	6,778	25.38	–5.85
Communist	Justin Legault	330	1.24	+0.69
Total valid votes		26,710	99.44	
Total rejected ballots		150	0.56	+0.10
Turnout		26,860	62.27	–12.15
Eligible voters		43,133		
New Democratic hold		Swing		+0.69
Source: Elections Ontario

1975 Ontario general election
Party	Candidate	Votes	%	±%
New Democratic	Bud Germa	12,258	38.35	–2.57
Liberal	Elmer Sopha	9,980	31.22	–0.17
Progressive Conservative	Joe Fabbro	9,549	29.88	+2.20
Communist	Maurice E. Proulx	175	0.55	–
Total valid votes		31,962	99.54	
Total rejected ballots		148	0.46	–0.29
Turnout		32,110	74.43	+4.26
Eligible voters		43,143		
New Democratic hold		Swing		–1.20
Source: Elections Ontario

1971 Ontario general election
Party	Candidate	Votes	%	±%
New Democratic	Bud Germa	11,905	40.92	+11.60
Liberal	Michael Meehan	9,135	31.40	–8.73
Progressive Conservative	Jack Raftis	8,053	27.68	–2.20
Total valid votes		29,093	99.25	
Total rejected ballots		220	0.75	+0.17
Turnout		29,313	70.16	+1.11
Eligible voters		41,779		
New Democratic gain from Liberal		Swing		+10.17
Source: Elections Ontario

1967 Ontario general election
Party	Candidate	Votes	%	±%
Liberal	Elmer Sopha	9,945	40.13	–1.47
Progressive Conservative	Jim Gordon	7,405	29.88	–7.99
New Democratic	Arthur Alexander Kube	7,266	29.32	+8.79
Social Credit	Ernie Tadla	167	0.67	–
Total valid votes		24,783	99.42	
Total rejected ballots		145	0.58	–0.08
Turnout		24,928	69.05	+3.10
Eligible voters		36,099		
Liberal hold		Swing		+3.26
Source: Elections Ontario

1963 Ontario general election
Party	Candidate	Votes	%	±%
Liberal	Elmer Sopha	10,176	41.60	–2.59
Progressive Conservative	Basil Scully	9,262	37.87	+6.41
New Democratic	Bud Germa	5,022	20.53	–3.82
Total valid votes		24,460	99.34	
Total rejected ballots		162	0.66	–0.11
Turnout		24,622	65.96	–2.60
Eligible voters		37,329		
Liberal hold		Swing		–4.50
Source: Elections Ontario

1959 Ontario general election
Party	Candidate	Votes	%	±%
Liberal	Elmer Sopha	10,904	44.19	+8.81
Progressive Conservative	Gerry Monaghan	7,761	31.46	–8.27
Co-operative Commonwealth	Elmer McVey	6,008	24.35	+17.00
Total valid votes		24,673	99.24	
Total rejected ballots		190	0.76	–0.73
Turnout		24,863	68.56	–2.52
Eligible voters		36,263		
Liberal gain from Progressive Conservative		Swing		+8.54
Source: Elections Ontario

1955 Ontario general election
Party	Candidate	Votes	%	±%
Progressive Conservative	Gerry Monaghan	8,957	39.73	–5.18
Liberal	George E. Collins	7,977	35.38	–1.80
Independent	Nelson Thibault	3,954	17.54	–
Co-operative Commonwealth	Paul Mihaichuk	1,657	7.35	–10.56
Total valid votes		22,545	98.51	
Total rejected ballots		341	1.49	+0.63
Turnout		22,886	71.08	+5.45
Eligible voters		32,196		
Progressive Conservative hold		Swing		–1.69
Source: Elections Ontario

1951 Ontario general election
Party	Candidate	Votes	%	±%
Progressive Conservative	Welland Gemmell	14,056	44.91	+15.90
Liberal	Leo Landreville	11,638	37.18	+14.51
Co-operative Commonwealth	G. F. Miller	5,605	17.91	–1.08
Total valid votes		31,299	99.14	
Total rejected ballots		271	0.86	–0.16
Turnout		31,570	65.64	–6.93
Eligible voters		48,098		
Progressive Conservative hold		Swing		+0.69
Source: Elections Ontario

1948 Ontario general election
Party	Candidate	Votes	%	±%
Progressive Conservative	Welland Gemmell	8,892	29.01	+8.45
Independent Co-operative Commonwealth	Robert Carlin	8,613	28.10	–19.23
Liberal	William S. Beaton	6,949	22.67	–3.56
Co-operative Commonwealth	A. J. Whalen	5,821	18.99	–28.34
Union of Electors	Jean-Marie Leduc	378	1.23	–
Total valid votes		30,653	98.98	
Total rejected ballots		315	1.02	+0.11
Turnout		30,968	72.57	–1.82
Eligible voters		42,674		
Progressive Conservative gain from Co-operative Commonwealth		Swing		+18.40
Source: Elections Ontario

1945 Ontario general election
Party	Candidate	Votes	%	±%
Co-operative Commonwealth	Robert Carlin	13,627	47.33	–12.56
Liberal	William H. Barry	7,552	26.23	–3.71
Progressive Conservative	Thomas S. Wilson	5,920	20.56	+16.37
Labor–Progressive	Charles McClure	1,692	5.88	–
Total valid votes		28,791	99.09	
Total rejected ballots		264	0.91	+0.02
Turnout		29,055	74.39	+6.25
Eligible voters		39,060		
Co-operative Commonwealth hold		Swing		–4.43
Source: Elections Ontario

1943 Ontario general election
Party	Candidate	Votes	%	±%
Co-operative Commonwealth	Robert Carlin	15,169	59.89	–
Liberal	James Cooper	7,582	29.94	–25.65
Independent Co-operative Commonwealth	William S. Beaton	1,513	5.97	–
Progressive Conservative	Harry Waisburg	1,062	4.19	–27.73
Total valid votes		25,326	99.12	
Total rejected ballots		226	0.88	–0.48
Turnout		25,552	68.13	–2.08
Eligible voters		37,503		
Co-operative Commonwealth gain from Liberal		Swing		–
Source: Elections Ontario

1937 Ontario general election
Party	Candidate	Votes	%	±%
Liberal	James Cooper	12,850	55.59	+2.71
Conservative	James Newburn	7,380	31.93	–12.89
Labour	George William Anderson	2,236	9.67	–
Independent Liberal	J. F. Lemieux	650	2.81	–
Total valid votes		23,116	98.63	
Total rejected ballots		320	1.37	+0.68
Turnout		23,436	70.21	–6.65
Eligible voters		33,379		
Liberal hold		Swing		+7.80
Source: Elections Ontario

1934 Ontario general election
Party	Candidate	Votes	%	±%
Liberal	Edmond Lapierre	10,516	52.88	–
Conservative	Charles McCrea	8,912	44.82	–
Communist	James Davis	458	2.30	–
Total valid votes		19,886	99.32	
Total rejected ballots		137	0.68	–
Turnout		20,023	76.86	–
Eligible voters		26,051		
Liberal gain from Conservative		Swing		–
Source: Elections Ontario

1929 Ontario general election
Party	Candidate	Votes
Conservative	Charles McCrea	acclaimed
Source: Elections Ontario

1926 Ontario general election
Party	Candidate	Votes
Conservative	Charles McCrea	acclaimed
Source: Elections Ontario

Ontario provincial by-election, August 16, 1923 Ministerial by-election, upon appointment as Minister of Mines
Party	Candidate	Votes
Conservative	Charles McCrea	acclaimed
Source: Elections Ontario

1923 Ontario general election
Party	Candidate	Votes	%	±%
Conservative	Charles McCrea	5,816	58.65	+18.11
Liberal	Raoul Hurtubise	4,100	41.35	+2.42
Total valid votes		9,916	98.98	
Total rejected ballots		102	1.02	–1.24
Turnout		10,018	60.80	–4.88
Eligible voters		16,476		
Conservative hold		Swing		+7.84
Source: Elections Ontario

1919 Ontario general election
Party	Candidate	Votes	%	±%
Conservative	Charles McCrea	3,551	40.55	–14.23
Liberal	Robert Hugh Arthur	3,409	38.92	–6.30
Labour-United Farmers	Aaron Thomas Sweezey	1,798	20.53	–
Total valid votes		8,758	97.75	
Total rejected ballots		202	2.25	+0.96
Turnout		8,960	65.68	+5.92
Eligible voters		13,641		
Conservative hold		Swing		–3.97
Source: Elections Ontario

1914 Ontario general election
Party	Candidate	Votes	%	±%
Conservative	Charles McCrea	2,047	54.78	–14.12
Liberal	Moise Allard	1,690	45.22	–
Total valid votes		3,737	98.71	
Total rejected ballots		49	1.29	–0.23
Turnout		3,786	59.76	+30.60
Eligible voters		6,335		
Conservative hold		Swing		–7.06
Source: Elections Ontario

1911 Ontario general election
Party	Candidate	Votes	%	±%
Conservative	Charles McCrea	2,541	68.90	+6.21
Socialist	Frank Herbert Sangster	1,147	31.10	–
Total valid votes		3,688	98.48	
Total rejected ballots		57	1.52	+0.48
Turnout		3,745	29.16	–35.12
Eligible voters		12,841		
Conservative hold		Swing		+3.11
Source: Elections Ontario

1908 Ontario general election
Party	Candidate	Votes	%
Conservative	Francis Cochrane	1,492	62.69
Liberal	Charles Vincent Price	888	37.31
Total valid votes		2,380	98.96
Total rejected ballots		25	1.04
Turnout		2,405	64.29
Eligible voters		3,741	
Conservative pickup new district.			
Source: Elections Ontario

== 2007 electoral reform referendum ==
2007 Ontario electoral reform referendum
Side	Votes	%
First Past the Post	21,842	68.3
Mixed member proportional	10,130	31.7
Total valid votes	31,972	100.0

== See also ==
- List of Ontario provincial electoral districts
- Canadian provincial electoral districts
