= Joseph Michaud (Ontario politician) =

Ontario politician

Ontario MPP
- In office 1902–1904
- Preceded by: Riding created
- Succeeded by: Azaire Adulphe Aubin
- Constituency: Nipissing West

Personal details
- Born: June 13, 1857 Saint-Fabien, Canada East
- Died: September 24, 1913 (aged 56) Sturgeon Falls, Ontario, Canada
- Resting place: Sturgeon Falls Roman Catholic Cemetery
- Party: Liberal
- Spouse: Emma Morin

Joseph Michaud (June 13, 1857 – September 24, 1913) was a Canadian politician, who represented the electoral district of Nipissing West in the Legislative Assembly of Ontario from 1902 to 1904.

Michaud was born in 1857. A member of the Liberal Party, he was elected in the 1902 election. He died in 1913.
