= Nipissing Lakers =

Nipissing University athletic teams

Coordinates: 46°20′23.76″N 79°29′32.17″W

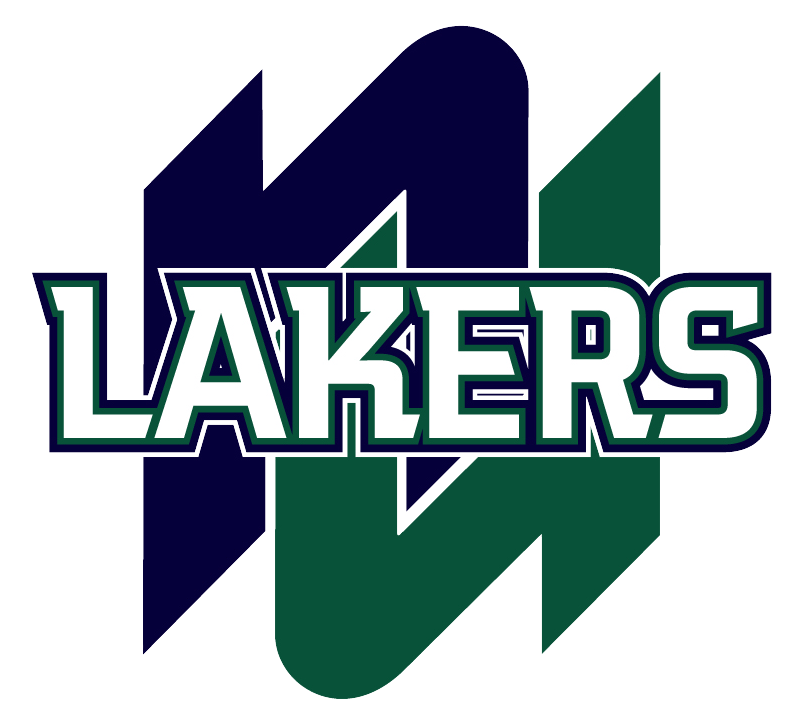
- University: Nipissing University
- Conference: Ontario University Athletics
- Athletic director: Sarah Batley
- Location: North Bay, Ontario
- Varsity teams: 14 7 women's, 7 co-ed)
- Basketball arena: Robert J Surtees Gymnasium
- Ice hockey arena: North Bay Memorial Gardens
- Soccer stadium: Nipissing Field
- Rowing venue: Trout Lake (Ontario)
- Other venues: Nipissing University Campus Nordic Ski Trails
- Colours: Blue and Green
- Mascot: Louie the Laker
- Website: nulakers.ca

The Nipissing Lakers are the athletic teams that represent Nipissing University in North Bay, Ontario, Canada that compete in U Sports.

The Lakers varsity programs compete in men's and women's basketball, ice hockey, volleyball, soccer, cross country running, rowing, and Nordic skiing.

The Lakers also have a university ringette team but it is not yet a part of the Ontario University Athletics program.

== Varsity sports ==
Men's sports	Women's sports
Basketball	Basketball
Cross country	Cross country
Ice hockey	Ice hockey
Nordic Skiing	Nordic Skiing
Rowing	Rowing
Soccer	Soccer
Volleyball	Volleyball

=== Men's Basketball ===
The Lakers men's basketball team debuted in U Sports and OUA play in the 2014–15 season. The Lakers made their first and lone playoff appearance in the 2016–2017 season, making it to the quarterfinals of the OUA playoffs, when they were eventually eliminated by the Ryerson Rams. The head coach of the team is Thomas Cory, who was hired to replace Chris Cheng in June 2019. The Lakers play their home games at the Robert J. Surtees Athletic Centre on the campus of Nipissing University.

=== Nordic Skiing ===
Main articles: Nipissing Lakers Nordic Team

The Lakers Nordic team competes in the OUA racing circuit, the Nordiq Canada race circuit, and the Cross Country Ski Ontario race circuit. The team has regularly sent athletes to the FIS Nordic Junior World Ski Championships Trials, as well as consistently sending athletes to the World University Games almost every year. The team trains on campus, with over 5 kilometers of groomed trails as well as waxing facilities.

=== Ice Hockey ===
Prior to their entry to U Sports the Lakers had fielded a women's ice hockey team that played in the Ontario Colleges Athletic Association. On June 26, 2012, it was announced that the women's ice hockey team would compete in Ontario University Athletics beginning with the 2013-14 season.

== 705 Challenge Cup ==
First established as a challenge between the varsity soccer teams of two Northern Ontario universities (Laurentian vs. Nipissing), in which the winning team was awarded the Riley Gallo Cup, the rivalry expanded. Introducing the 705 Challenge Cup in 2016, the results of all regular season games between the Lakers and the Voyageurs varsity teams for men's and women's basketball, ice hockey, and soccer, comprised the overall won-loss record in determining the annual Cup winner. The Lakers would win their first 705 Challenge Cup during the 2019–20 athletics season.

== Ringette ==
The Lakers University ringette team competes annually in the University Challenge Cup, an annual national competition reserved exclusively for Canadian university and college ringette teams. University ringette is organized by "Canadian University & College Ringette Association", commonly known by the abbreviation, "CUR" due to the organization's original name, "Canadian University Ringette". The sport of ringette was invented in North Bay, Ontario (specifically West Ferris) and Espanola, Ontario in 1963.

== Facilities ==
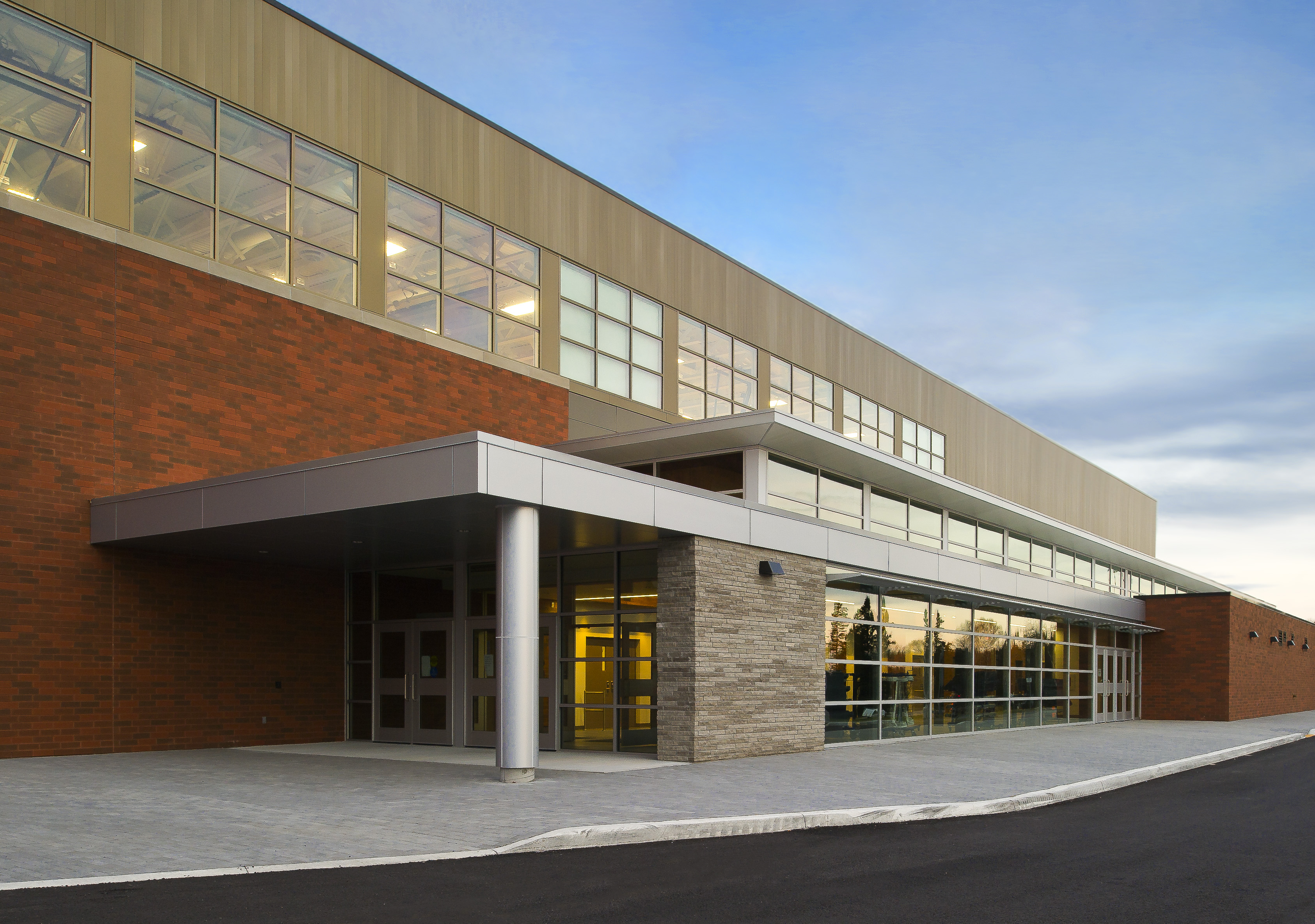
RJ Surtees Student Athletic Centre exterior

Nipissing Athletics is housed in the Robert J. Surtees Student Athletics Centre, which has undergone multiple expansions since it opened in 2001. The Athletic Centre features three full-sized gymnasiums, two squash courts, three fitness studios, a weight room, and a cardio-weight room. The main gym, which hosts the varsity volleyball and basketball games, has a seating capacity of approximately 1200 people.

The soccer pitch and Frisbee golf course are located behind the Athletic Centre. A main feature of the Athletic Centre is the Living Wall, a hydroponic green wall of plants that improves the air quality of the facility due to the oxygen it produces. Nipissing students also have access to a gym facility shared with Canadore College, which is located within the Main Campus building.

== See also ==
- Ontario University Athletics
- U Sports
