= Nipissing Lakers Nordic Team =

Nipissing Nordic Ski Team
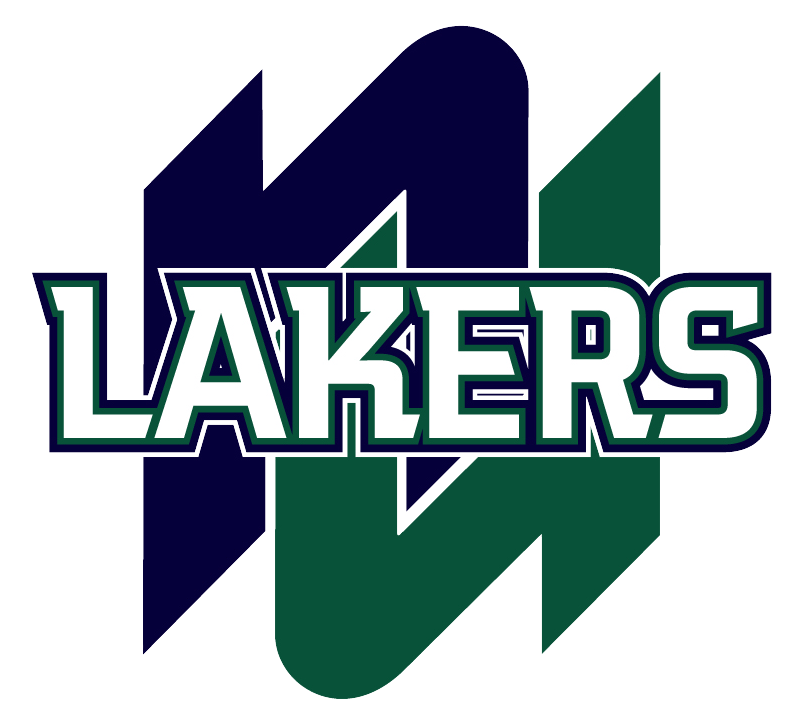
- University: Nipissing University
- Head coach: Toivo Koivukoski
- Conference: OUA
- Location: North Bay, Ontario
- Years active: 15+

The Nipissing Lakers Nordic Team is the Varsity Cross-country skiing team that represents Nipissing University in North Bay, Ontario.

== Team history ==
The Lakers Nordic Team competes in the OUA racing circuit, the Nordiq Canada race circuit, and the Cross Country Ski Ontario race circuit. The team has regularly sent athletes to the FIS Nordic Junior World Ski Championships Trials, as well as consistently sending athletes to the World University Games.

=== Conferences ===
- Ontario University Athletics
- Nordiq Canada
- U Sports

== Notable Alumni and Athletes ==
- Alexander Maycock
- Shelby Dickey
- Madison Mullin
- David Nighbor
- Dr. Jonathan Pitt

== Athletes Sent to FISU ==
- Alexander Maycock
- Shelby Dickey
- David Nighbor
- Joseph Hutton
- Brooke Ailey
- Jordan Cascagnette
- Dr. Thomsen D'Hont
- Kajsa Heyes

== Arena ==
=== Nipissing University Campus Ski Trails ===
- 5 km of groomed ski trails
- Indoor and outdoor waxing facilities
