= Lake Talon =

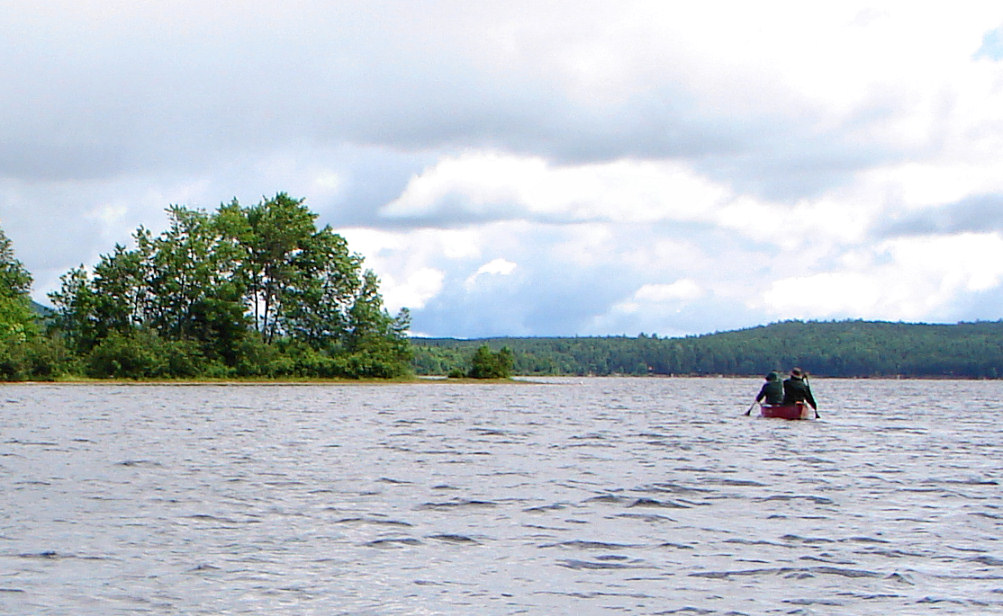
- Grasswell Point, roughly the centre of Lake Talon

- Location of Lake Talon in Ontario.
- Location: Nipissing, Ontario, Canada
- Coordinates: 46°18′16″N 79°03′22″W
- Type: Lake
- Part of: Ottawa River drainage basin
- Primary inflows: Mattawa River, Kaibuskong River
- Primary outflows: Mattawa River at Talon Chute
- Max. length: 11.3 km (7.0 mi)
- Max. width: 1.7 km (1.1 mi)
- Average depth: 67 m (220 ft)
- Surface elevation: 196 m (643 ft)
- Settlements: Blanchard's Landing

Lake Talon is a lake in Nipissing District, Ontario, Canada that is part of the Mattawa River system and the Ottawa River drainage basin. The majority of the water body is located in Bonfield Township with the rest in Calvin Township and the unincorporated Olrig Township. The lake is a popular cottaging spot during the summer, as it is dotted with cottages mostly along the southern shore. It also has a Nipissing University field station on the north shore of the eastern end. The lake and its shores, with the exception of Kaibuskong Bay, are protected as part of the Mattawa River Provincial Park.

The primary inflows are the Mattawa River and the Kaibuskong River, and the primary outflow is the Mattawa River at Talon Chute, which flows to the Ottawa River.

== See also ==
- List of lakes in Ontario
