= Camp Champlain =

- Unincorporated community

- Location of Camp Champlain in Ontario
- Coordinates: 46°19′20″N 79°17′42″W
- Country: Canada
- Province: Ontario
- Region: Northeastern Ontario
- District: Nipissing
- Municipality: North Bay
- Elevation: 239 m (784 ft)
- Time zone: UTC-5 (Eastern Time Zone)
  - Summer (DST): UTC-4 (Eastern Time Zone)
- Postal Code FSA: P0H
- Area codes: 705, 249

Camp Champlain is an unincorporated area and community in city of North Bay, Nipissing District in Northeastern Ontario, Canada. The community is located on a long, unnamed peninsula that separates Four Mile Bay from the rest of Trout Lake.

It consists of a number of cottages lining the eastern bulb of the peninsula and is served by Peninsula Road, which goes from Camp Champlain to Ontario Highway 63 at Lounsbury.
