= Talon Chute =

Coordinates: 46°16′57″N 79°0′12″W

Talon Chute is a waterfall on the Mattawa River and historic site on the border between the geographic township of Olrig, Nipissing, Unorganized, North Part and the municipality of Calvin in Nipissing District, northeastern Ontario, Canada. It is located at the south-eastern end of Lake Talon about 2 kilometres (1.2 mi) east of the community of Blanchard's Landing, and is accessible only from the water or on foot. It features a water control dam and was once the site of a brucite marble mine.

Historical Plaque at Talon Chutes

== See also ==
- List of mines in Ontario
