= Mattawa River =

Mattawa River Petite Rivière
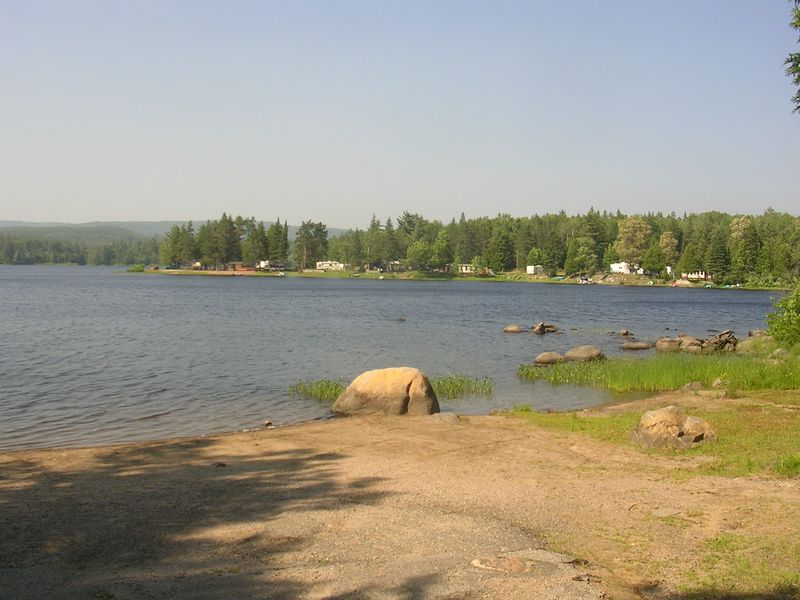
- Pimisi Bay on the Mattawa River

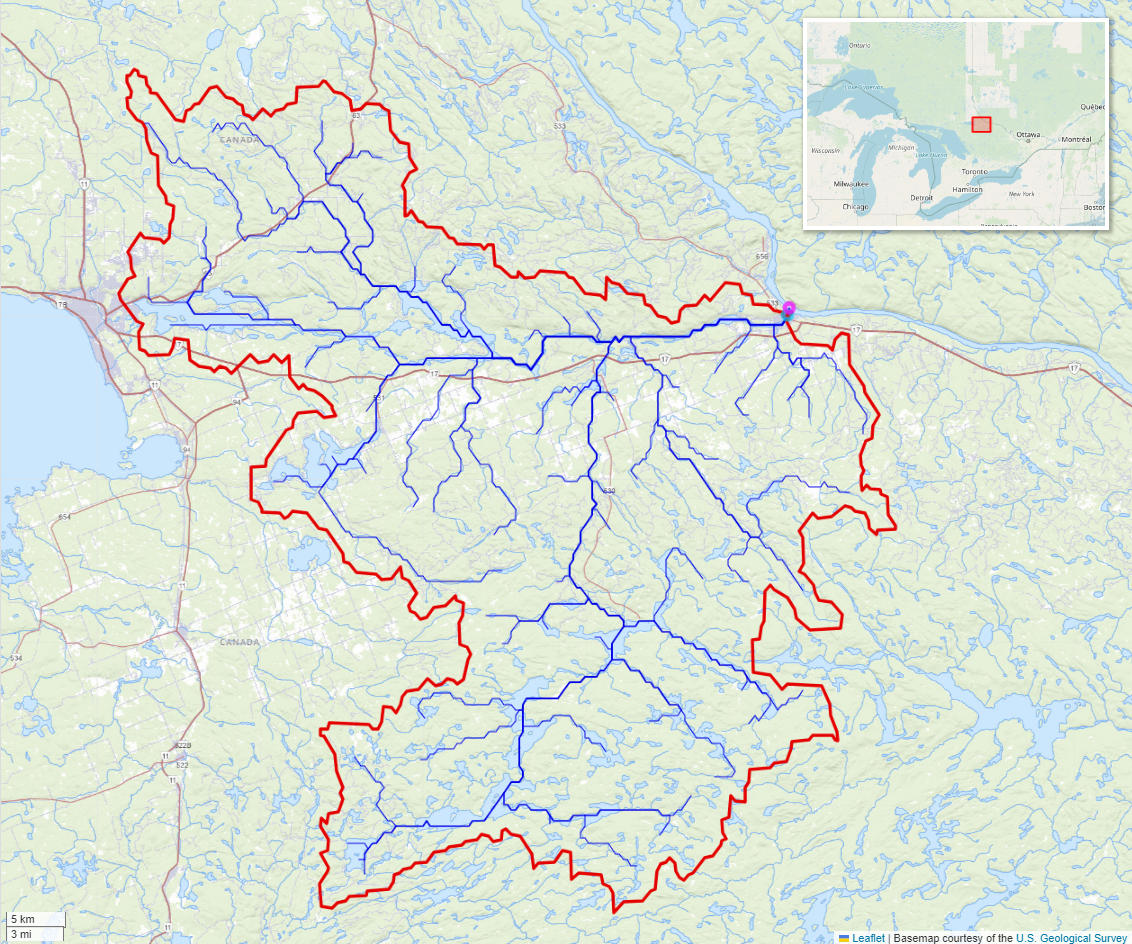
- Mattawa River basin map
- Etymology: Algonquin language

Location
- Country: Canada
- Province: Ontario
- District: Nipissing

Physical characteristics
- Source: Trout Lake
  - location: North Bay, Ontario
  - coordinates: 46°18′48″N 79°16′09″W
  - elevation: 198.5 m (651 ft)
- Mouth: Ottawa River
  - location: Mattawa, Ontario
  - coordinates: 46°19′13″N 78°42′26″W
  - elevation: 148 m (486 ft)
- Length: 76 km (47 mi)
- Basin size: 1,170 km^{2} (450 sq mi)

Basin features
- Progression: Ottawa River→ St. Lawrence River→ Gulf of St. Lawrence
- River system: Ottawa River drainage basin
- Tributaries
  - right: Kaibuskong River, Amable du Fond River

The Mattawa River is a river in central Ontario, Canada. It flows east from Trout Lake east of North Bay and enters the Ottawa River at the town of Mattawa. Counting from the head of Trout Lake, it is 76 kilometres (47 mi) long. The river's name comes from the Algonquin word for "meeting of waterways".

Two provincial parks are located along it: the Mattawa River Provincial Park stretches along both sides of the river's banks for almost its full length; and Samuel de Champlain Provincial Park, located about 10 kilometres (6.2 mi) from the river's end.

== Geography ==
The river flows inside a graben through the Algonquin highlands. This valley is an offshoot arm of ancient rift valley, called the Ottawa-Bonnechere Graben, which still causes minor earthquakes in the area. From Lake Talon to Mattawa the river flows through a rock-walled canyon up to 150 metres (490 ft) in places.

Tributaries include the:

- Amable du Fond River
- Kaibuskong River
- North River

The Porte de l'enfer (Hell's Gate) is a peculiar cave in the river's bank speculated to be a native ochre mine. In 1761, Alexander Henry the elder reported on this cave and the myths surrounding it. It was said to be inhabited by an evil and fierce demon, hence its name.

Evidence of a post-glacial spillway which drained the Great Lakes into the Ottawa River until about 4000 years ago can be seen at several sites along the river. There are potholes at Portage de Talon and numerous cataracts and former river channels, such as the boulder pavement between Pine Lake and McCool Bay, 12–15 metres (39–49 ft) above the river's present-day waterline.

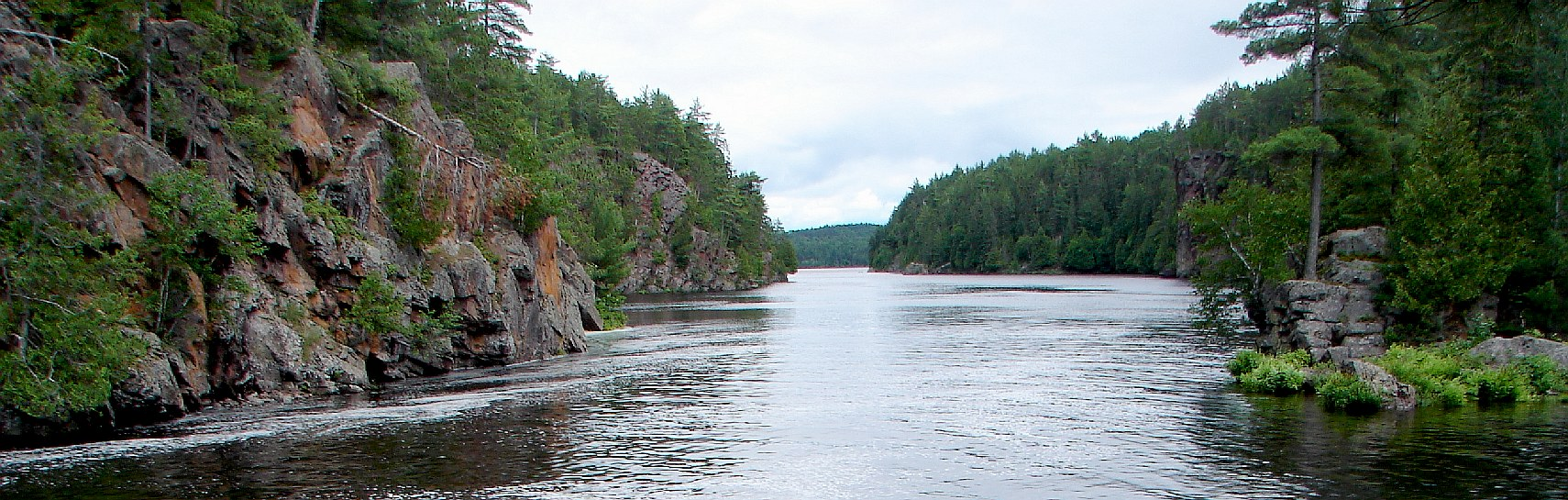
The Mattawa River just downstream of the Talon Chute

== History ==
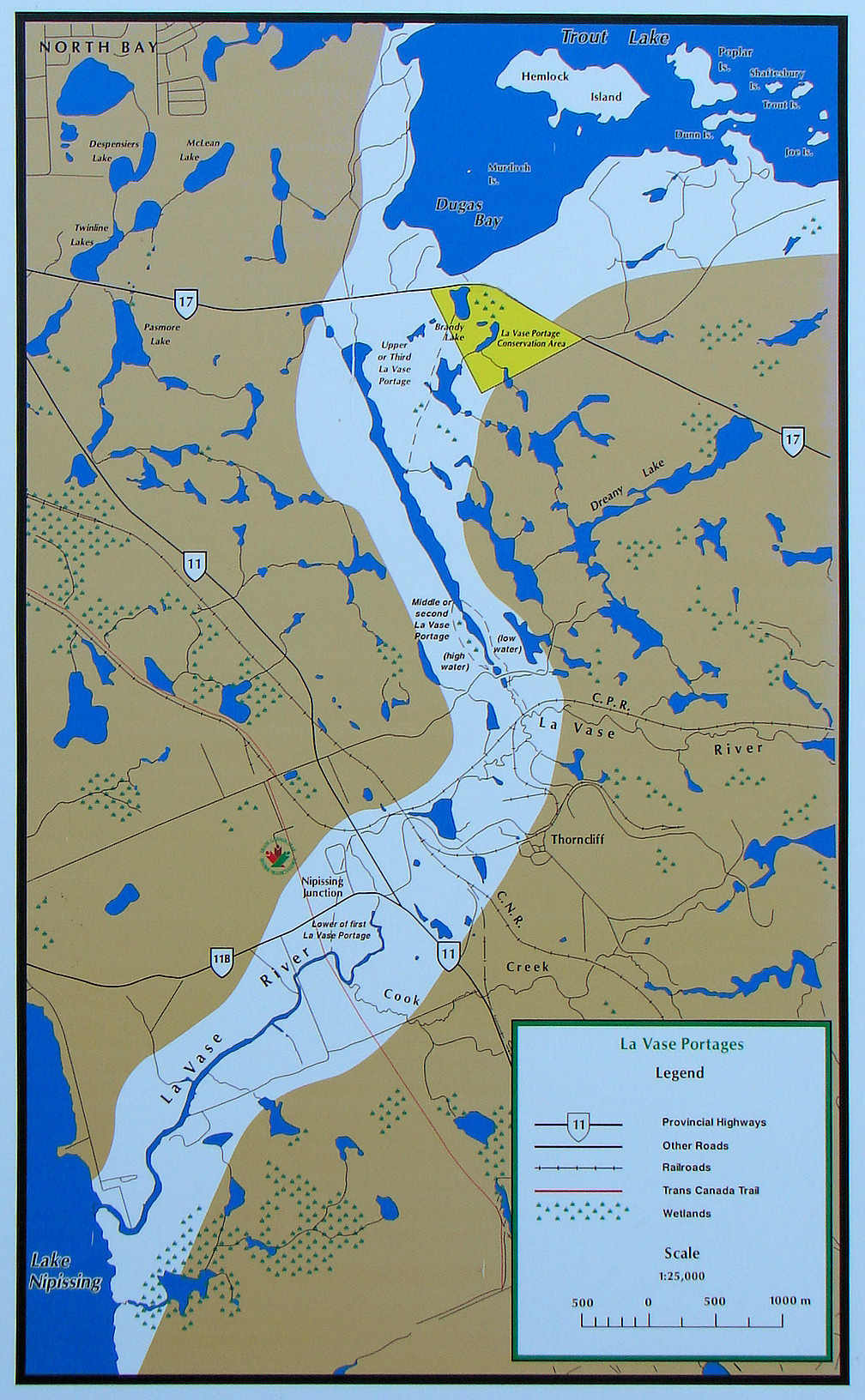
Map of the La Vase Portages

The Mattawa River had been used by native peoples as an important transportation corridor for many centuries. In 1610, Étienne Brûlé and in 1615, Samuel de Champlain were the first Europeans to travel the river. For some 200 years thereafter, it formed part of the important water route leading from Montreal west to Lake Superior. It was the primary access to the vast Canadian interior in the days of the fur trade. Canoes travelling west up the Ottawa turned left at "the Forks" (the mouth of the Mattawa) to enter the "Petite Rivière" ("Small River", as compared to the Ottawa), reaching Lake Nipissing by way of "La Vase Portage", an 11-kilometre (6.8 mi) stretch of water and portages.

Other notable travellers on the Mattawa included Jean Nicolet in 1620, Jean de Brébeuf in 1626, Gabriel Lallemant in 1648, Pierre-Esprit Radisson and Médard des Groseilliers in 1658, La Verendrye in 1731, Alexander MacKenzie in 1794, and David Thompson in 1812.

In the 19th century, the river provided access to large untouched stands of white pine. The river was also used to transport logs to sawmills. The value of the Mattawa River as a transportation link ended in 1881 when the railroad was built to Mattawa.

Almost the full length of the river was protected as a provincial park in 1970 and has been designated as a Canadian Heritage River in January 1988. While logging is still an important industry in this region, its shores are now protected from further development and logging.

Today, the river and lakes are mainly used for recreation.

== Provincial park ==
Mattawa River Provincial Park
- IUCN category II (national park)
- Location: Ontario, Canada
- Nearest city: North Bay; Mattawa
- Coordinates: 46°18′45″N 79°05′35″W
- Area: 14,142.00 ha (54.6026 sq mi)
- Designation: Waterway
- Established: 1970
- Governing body: Ontario Parks

In 1970, a section of the Mattawa River from the eastern end of Trout Lake to the western boundary of Samuel de Champlain Park was protected as Ontario's first "waterway" park. It was a 33 kilometres (21 mi) long and 122 metres (400 ft) wide ribbon of land on both sides of the river with an area of 32.57 square kilometres (12.58 sq mi). In 2006, the park was greatly expanded as a result of Ontario’s Living Legacy Plan. An additional 108.8 square kilometres (42.0 sq mi) of Crown Land was added along both shores, and extending it on the eastern side of Samuel de Champlain Park towards the town of Mattawa. It now includes Rice Bay Delta marsh communities, silver maple swamp forests, and the Talon Lake Forest.

It is a non-operating park, meaning there are no visitor services. Permitted activities are mountain biking, boating, canoeing, fishing, hiking, hunting, snowmobiling, and swimming. There are 20 backcountry campsites provided and the portage trails are marked with signs and historic plaques. However most are in various stages of neglect.

== Canoeing ==
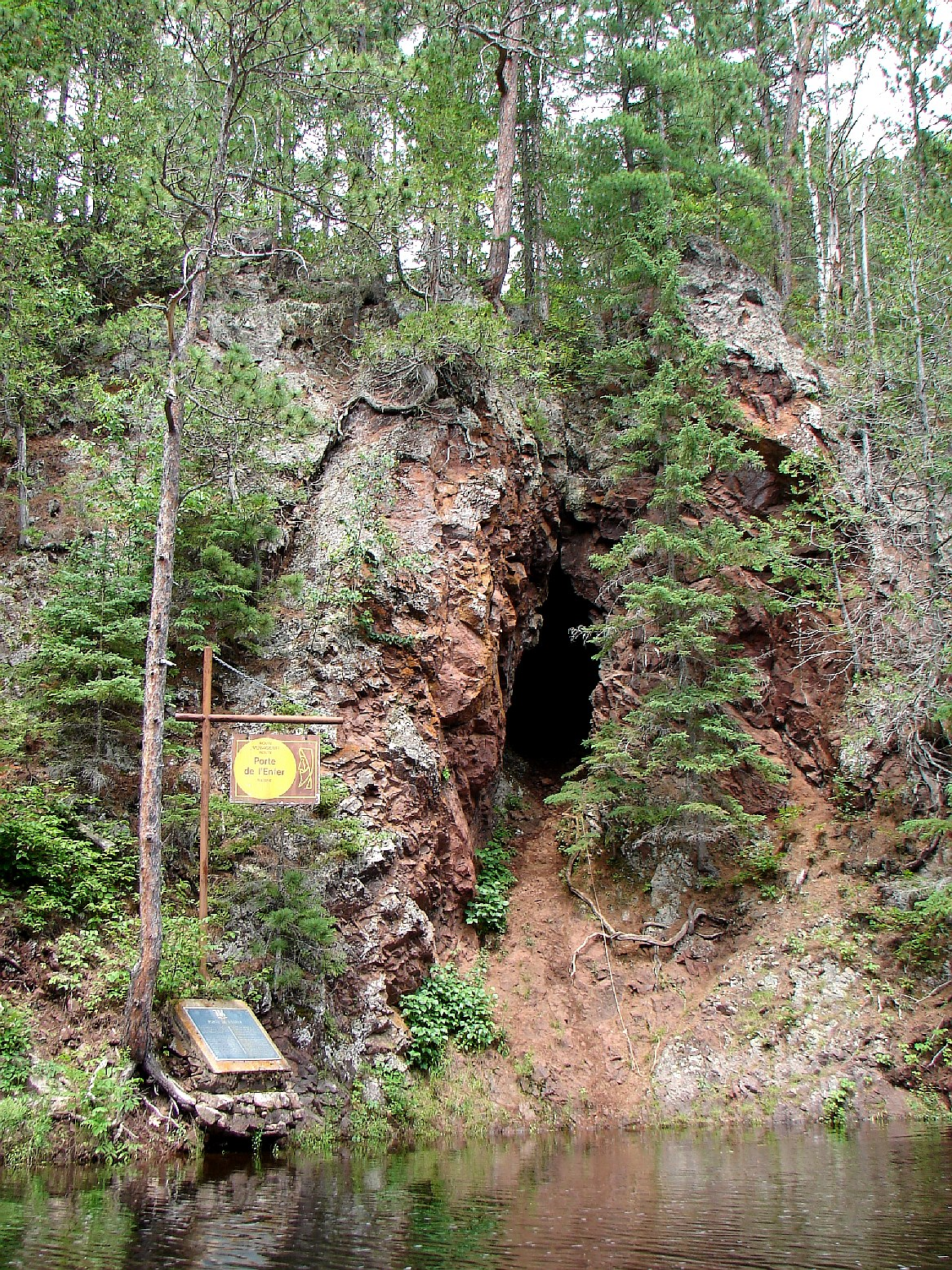
Porte de l'Enfer or Hell's Gate

The Mattawa River is a popular destination for weekend canoe camping trips, that can be travelled in both directions. It has 14 portages which all are fairly short, well-marked and cleared. The route description below follows the river's flow from west to east.

Public access is on Trout Lake. Continue east on the river. Some older maps may still show the Tortue Rapids but these were blasted and no longer present. Turtle Lake follows.

From here the river goes north through several sets of small lakes (requiring a lift-over or short portage between each), before looping back and flowing into the north end of Lake Talon. But the historic canoe route bypasses this section by going to Lake Talon through Pine Lake, via Portage de la Mauvaise Musique and Portage Pin de Musique.

At the end of Lake Talon, portage around the dam. After Pimisi Lake, there are a few Class 1 rapids until the Paresseux Falls. Shortly after follows the Porte de l'Enfer (Hell's Gate) on the north bank.

There are two short whitewater sections inside Champlain Park but which become shallow and a rock garden in low water. The last portage before Mattawa and the Ottawa River is around the Hurdman Dam.

=== Race ===
The 64 kilometres (40 mi) Mattawa River Canoe Race has been held each year since 1976. The race runs from Olmsted Beach on Trout Lake in North Bay to Mattawa Island Conservation Area, through open water, rapids, and portages. This popular race is open to several classes of competition, including marathon and recreational canoeing, kayaking, voyageur canoes, and stand-up paddleboards. There is also a 13-kilometre (8.1 mi) race which runs from Samuel de Champlain Provincial Park to the finish line at the Mattawa Island Conservation Area. The race is organized by the North Bay-Mattawa Conservation Authority and sanctioned by the Ontario Marathon Canoe and Kayaking Racing Association (OMCKRA).

The race record was set in 1995 at 5 hours, 27 minutes and 53 seconds.

== See also ==
- List of Ontario rivers
