= Trout Lake (Ontario) =

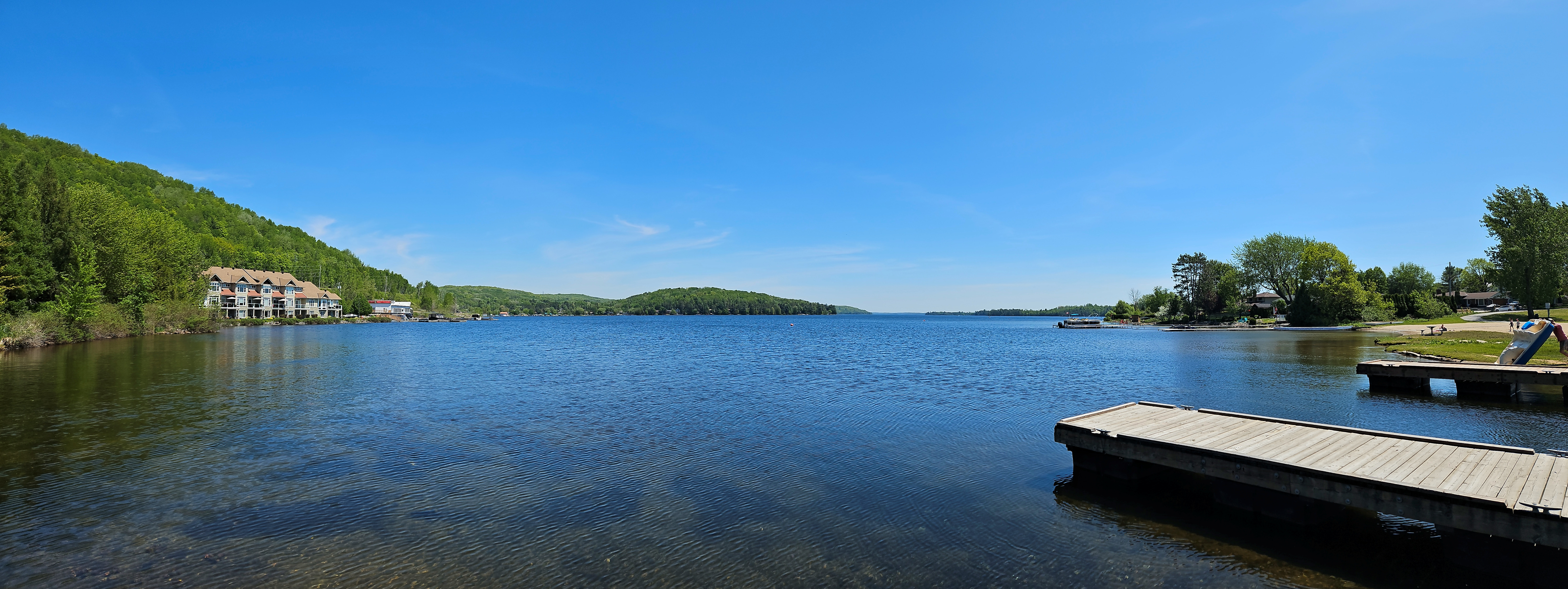

- Location in Ontario
- Location: East of North Bay, Ontario
- Coordinates: 46°19′09″N 79°20′11″W
- Type: Lake
- Etymology: Trout
- Part of: Ottawa River drainage basin
- Primary outflows: Mattawa River
- Max. length: 11 km (6.8 mi)
- Max. width: 4 km (2.5 mi)
- Surface area: 18.9 km^{2} (7.3 sq mi)
- Max. depth: 69 m (226 ft)
- Shore length^{1}: 51 km (32 mi)
- Surface elevation: 202 m (663 ft)
- Islands: 25
- Settlements: North Bay (W): Feronia (N) (hamlet); Camp Champlain (E) (peninsula); Corbeil (S)
- ^{1} Shore length is not a well-defined measure.

Trout Lake is a lake in the municipalities of East Ferris and North Bay, Nipissing District, Northeastern Ontario, Canada. It lies approximately 6 km (3.7 mi) east of the much larger Lake Nipissing, with the city of North Bay in between them.

Trout Lake is the source of the Mattawa River and a significant body of water on a well-known historic North American voyageur (fur-trading) route. It is about 11 km (6.8 mi) long and 4 km (2.5 mi) wide and exits eastward into the Mattawa River, which flows via the Ottawa River to the St. Lawrence River. Some of the most difficult portages are found on this part of the voyageur route between Trout Lake and the end of the Mattawa River, e.g., Portage de Mauvaise Musique, located at the Talon Chute (named after Jean Talon, the first Intendant of New France).

== History ==
Due to the short overland distance to Lake Nipissing, Trout Lake became a natural way point for voyageurs en route to and from Mattawa.

A train derailment in 1967 resulted in a significant spill of zinc and lead, which ended up wiping out the lake's population of landlocked Atlantic salmon.

== Geography ==
Trout Lake

Bays:

- Delaney Bay
- Dugas Bay
- Four Mile Bay: about 5.4 kilometres (3.4 mi) long, and is separated from the rest of Trout Lake by an equally long peninsula. It varies from 0.2 to 1.4 kilometres (0.1 to 0.9 mi) wide, the former at the mouth of the bay. The community of Camp Champlain is on it southern shore, and Four Mile Creek enters Trout Lake at the bay.
- Milnes Bay
- One Mile Bay

Islands:

- Camp Island
- Cedar Island
- Dave Island
- Dellview Island
- Dunn Island
- Falconbridge Island
- Fitzsimmons Island
- Hemlock Island
- Hughes Island
- Joe Island
- Little Joe Island
- Louisville Island
- Murdoch Island
- Payne Island
- Poplar Island
- Rolph Island
- Shaftesbury Island
- Sunset Island
- Three Sisters Islands
- Trout Island

Tributaries:

- Doran Creek
- Four Mile Creek
- Hogan Creek
- Lees Creek

== Ecology and fishing ==
In 1935, Atlantic salmon were first introduced into the lake and only spawned in Four Mile Creek which, in 1958, was made a fish sanctuary. On 7 March 1967, a train operated by the Ontario Northland Railroad and carrying a load of zinc and lead derailed near Four Mile Creek. The high concentration of zinc in Four Mile Creek wiped out the spawning grounds and caused the salmon to die out.

After repeated attempts at cleaning Four Mile Creek salmon were reintroduced starting in 1989 with 10,000 fingerlings. Surveys from 1991 and 1992, along with estimates and catches between 1991 and 1995 indicated that the salmon were making a recovery. During the 1991 survey another 25 fish species were recorded in Four Mile Creek including largemouth bass, northern pike, and Rainbow trout.

The most common fish species today are; lake trout, largemouth bass, and northern pike, though several other species are present.

== Water reservoir ==
The City of North Bay (population 52,662 as of the 2021 census) draws its drinking water from Trout Lake. While the urban core of North Bay is located primarily between Trout Lake and Lake Nipissing, the city limits contain the lake's entire northern shore. Much of the lake's southern shore is located within the township of East Ferris.

== Beaches and recreation ==
The City of North Bay maintains two lifeguard-staffed swimming beaches on the western shores of the lake.

== Seaplane base ==
North Bay Water Aerodrome (TC LID: CNH7) is a seaplane base located on the north shore of Delaney Bay, on the north-western end of the lake.

== See also ==
- List of lakes of Ontario
