= Neighbourhoods in North Bay, Ontario =

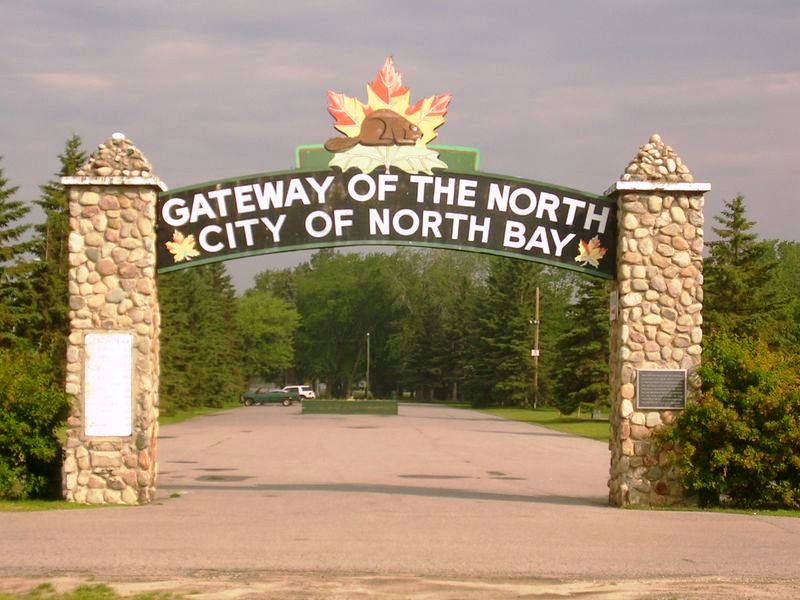
North Bay's Gateway Arch, located in Lee Park between Ferris and Downtown North Bay.

The Canadian city of North Bay, Ontario, is divided into numerous neighbourhoods.

== Birchaven ==
Birchaven^{1} is a neighbourhood located to the south of Trout Lake Road. Many people unfamiliar with this area and have incorrect maps mistakenly believe that it is called Birch Haven. Birchaven^{1} borders Trout Lake and extends to Wallace Road.

== Downtown ==
North Bay's Downtown is located along the shore of Lake Nipissing, between the Gateway and Ferris neighbourhoods. The area is aligned southeast to northwest, and bounded roughly by Fisher Street, Memorial Drive, Algonquin Avenue and Fifth Avenue.

== Feronia ==
Feronia is a dispersed rural community and unincorporated place (46°21′44″N 79°19′06″W). It used to be a farming community with a school, general store and community centre. In 2005 Feronia is far less impressive, however still with a decent population scattered off the highway. There is still a community centre, which is mostly an ice rink and a swing set, and up off the highway slightly on Cemetery Road, you will find a cemetery that has been there since the early 1900s. Daly's Road, so named for the Daly family who had farms all along that road, Four Mile Lake Road and Feronia Road are predominantly the entrance points to Feronia off the highway.

Some time between 1906 and 1918, Maude Emma Beach became the first school teacher for the brand new one room school house built on Feronia Road. This school house serviced the farming community of the area, and it was not uncommon for children to miss school during harvest and planting time.

== Gateway ==
Gateway, one of the city's oldest residential neighbourhoods, is located immediately adjacent to the city's downtown core. The neighbourhood is centred on Algonquin Avenue.

== Hornell Heights ==
Hornell Heights is the primary residential and institutional cluster on the grounds of CFB North Bay and Jack Garland Airport. Hornell Heights is not financially affiliated with the municipality of North Bay and is Federal land, funded and taken care of through Federal tax dollars. Currently North Bay provides transit service and snow removal service to some areas of Hornell Heights. Mail sent to this area is to be addressed to Hornell Heights, Ontario.

== Pinewood ==
The Pinewood area, adjacent to Gateway, is roughly the area between Algonquin Avenue and Gormanville Road, Main West and Highway 17.

== Thibeault Terrace ==
Thibeault Terrace is a residential neighbourhood located north of Highway 17 and west of the Algonquin Avenue segment of Highway 11. The neighbourhood is located between the escarpment and McKeown Avenue.

Thibeault Terrace is also the closest neighbourhood to the campuses of Canadore College and Nipissing University housing many students.

== Trout Lake Road ==
The residential neighbourhoods of St. John's Village, Eastview, Graniteville, Sage, Birchaven and Trout Mills extend northeasterly from the city core along Trout Lake Road.

== West Ferris ==
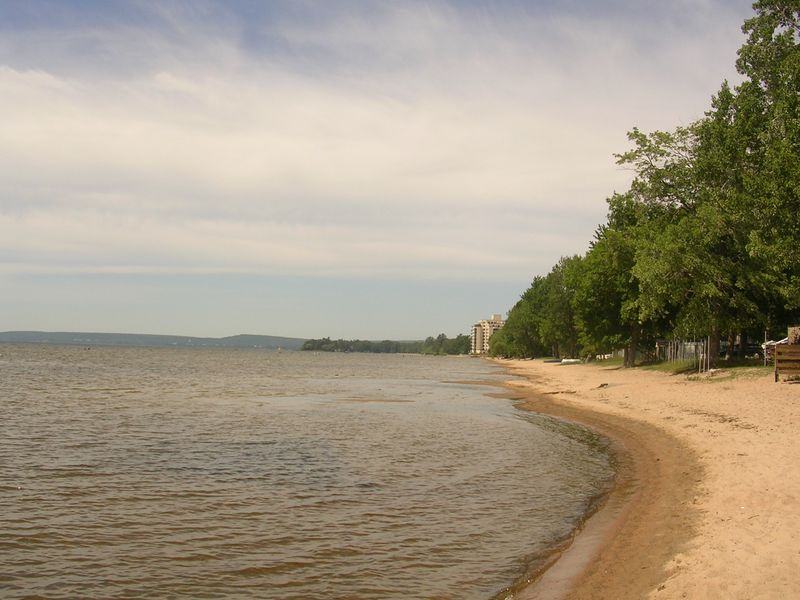
A beach on Lake Nipissing in the Ferris neighbourhood.

West Ferris, formerly an independent township, was surveyed in 1880, and named after James Marshall Ferris, a member of the Legislative Assembly of Ontario. It was amalgamated into the city in 1968.

The township was quite small in size, sandwiched between the City of North Bay on the north, the township of North Himsworth on the south, East Ferris on the east, and Lake Nipissing on the west. The township consists of North Bay's southern suburbs, namely the community of West Ferris. The area also includes the neighbourhoods of Sunset Park, Marshall Park, Champlain Park, Thorncliff, Tweedsmuir and Nipissing Junction. The La Vase River bifurcates the township running from the east into Lake Nipissing, as does Highway 11 running north–south. The township is home to about 14,000 people.

== Widdifield ==
Widdifield, formerly an independent township, was first surveyed in 1883 and named for Ontario MPP Joseph Henry Widdifield. It was amalgamated into the city in 1968, at the same time as West Ferris.

The pre-amalgamation boundary between North Bay and Widdifield extended along a line from Trout Lake to Lake Nipissing. The city's Lansdowne and Norwood Avenues, in the Gateway neighbourhood, marked part of the municipal boundary. The township also includes the smaller neighbourhoods of Cooks Mills, Feronia, Fricker, Hornell Heights, Lounsbury, Pinewood, Thibeault Terrace, Trout Mills, Wallace Heights, and Kenwood.

A neighbourhood in the northeastern corner of the city, near Widdifield Forest Provincial Park, retains the Widdifield name. Widdifield Secondary School was also the name of one of the city's main public high schools. The school closed in 2020.

The old Widdifield Fire Tower still stands on Tower Drive with its cupola removed. It is now used as a radio tower for the City of North Bay. In the winter of 1965 the tower was used in scenes from the old CBC TV show The Forest Rangers.

== See also ==
- List of townships in Ontario

== Sources ==
- MapArt Ontario Road Atlas
- Statistics Canada
- Downtown North Bay
- Heritage Perspectives
- Transit schedules
