= Nipissing University =

Public university in Ontario, Canada

Coordinates: 46°20′36″N 79°29′30″W

- Nipissing University coat of arms
- Former names: North Bay Normal School (1909–1953), North Bay Teachers’ College (1953–1973), Northeastern University (1960–1967), Nipissing College (1967–1992)
- Motto: Latin: Integritas
- Motto in English: Spirit of Integrity
- Type: Public university
- Established: 1909; 117 years ago
- Academic affiliations: COU, CVU, Universities Canada
- Endowment: C$15 million (2025)
- Chancellor: Scott Russell
- President: Kevin Wamsley
- Academic staff: 200
- Administrative staff: 1,350 (350 full-time staff)
- Students: 6,500 (2025)
- Undergraduates: 6,300
- Postgraduates: 200
- Location: North Bay, Ontario, Canada
- Campus: Suburban, 720 acres (290 ha)
Colours
- Nickname: Nipissing Lakers
- Sporting affiliations: U Sports - CIS, OUA.
- Mascot: Louie the Laker
- Website: nipissingu.ca

Nipissing University is a public university located in North Bay, Ontario, Canada. Its scenic hilltop campus overlooks Lake Nipissing. The university has established a strong reputation in fields such as education, arts, science, business, and nursing, and is home to the prestigious Schulich School of Education.

== History ==
=== North Bay Normal School (1909–1953) ===
The earliest precursor to Nipissing University was the North Bay Normal School, established in 1909 in North Bay to train teachers for Ontario’s school system. In keeping with the terminology of the time, “normal schools” were institutions dedicated to teacher education and professional training.

=== North Bay Teachers’ College (1953–1973) ===
In 1953, the institution was renamed the North Bay Teachers’ College, continuing its mandate of preparing educators for Ontario’s education system. In 1973, the North Bay Teachers’ College was incorporated into Nipissing College as the Faculty of Education, which later became the Schulich School of Education.

=== Northeastern University (1960–1967) ===
The roots of Nipissing University date back to 1947, when residents of North Bay formed a committee with the goal of establishing a university within the city. The 1958 Northeastern University Committee continued their efforts in the following years. By 1960, Northeastern University was established and for a short time in 1960–1961, the institution offered first year university courses in Arts, Science, and Commerce in facilities provided by a local Catholic boys' high school. Its application to the Ontario Ministry of Education for a degree-granting university charter was denied on February 28, 1961, and the classes ended shortly thereafter.

By mid-1962, Northeastern University had leased new space on Cassells Street in North Bay and arranged for Laurentian University professors to teach extension night classes there. This arrangement continued through mid-1967, with students receiving credits from Laurentian for the coursework done in these classes.

=== Nipissing College (1967–1992) ===
Northeastern University changed its name to Nipissing College and signed an affiliation agreement with Laurentian University in 1967. Students attending Nipissing College in North Bay were also officially students of Laurentian University (headquartered in Sudbury, Ontario, 125 km away) with Laurentian being the degree-granting institution.

In 1972, the College Education Centre officially opened. This building, which is still home to Nipissing University, was shared between multiple other educational institutions including Canadore College, a school of nursing, and a teachers' college. In 1973, the North Bay Teachers' College was incorporated into Nipissing College as the Faculty of Education.

=== Nipissing University (since 1992) ===
Nipissing University received its charter as an independent university in 1992, thus allowing the school to grant baccalaureate degrees. On December 12, 2001, the government of Ontario passed a bill revising the university's charter to permit it to grant graduate degrees.

The governance of Nipissing University is modelled on the provincial University of Toronto Act of 1906, which established a bicameral system of university government consisting of a senate (faculty), responsible for academic policy, and a board of governors (citizens) exercising exclusive control over financial policy and having formal authority in all other matters. The president, appointed by the board, is to provide a link between the two bodies and to perform institutional leadership.

== Academics ==
The university is composed of three faculties: the Faculty of Applied and Professional Studies, the Faculty of Arts and Science, and the Schulich School of Education, as well as the School of Graduate Studies. Nipissing University has approximately 6300 undergraduate students, the majority of which are full-time students, and 200 graduate students (current as of 2025). Applicants entering from high school must have a minimum of 70%, or 75% if applying for a degree in Criminal Justice or Concurrent Education, to be considered for full-time (30 credits) study. Cut-off averages for each program change annually. The graduation rate at Nipissing University is 85.9%, which is higher than the average Ontario graduation rate of 77.3%.

Nipissing University offers over 30 areas of study, many of which have opportunities for internships or experiential learning. Some partnership programs, such as Environmental Biology and Technology, Criminology and Criminal Justice (Policing Stream), and Social Welfare and Social Development allow students to earn both a bachelor's degree and a college diploma from Canadore College in four years.

Nipissing University’s School of Nursing consistently ranks as the top nursing program in Ontario based on NCLEX-RN registration examination performance.

Formally known as the Faculty of Education, the Schulich School of Education was established in 2010 following a donation from philanthropist Seymour Schulich. Nipissing University’s Faculty of Education was designated the Schulich School of Education. Programs within the Schulich School of Education include Concurrent and Consecutive Bachelor of Education degrees, as well as a Bachelor of Physical and Health Education.

Nipissing University marked the occasion shortly after celebrating 100 years of teacher education in Ontario in 2009. Today, the Schulich School of Education is one of the largest faculties of education in Ontario and is considered the most competitive in the province for admission.

=== Undergraduate programs ===
Nipissing University offers the following undergraduate degrees:

- Bachelor of Arts (BA) with majors in: Anthropology, Child and Family Studies, Classical Studies, Computer Science, Criminal Justice (with streams in Corrections, Criminal Justice Studies, Criminology, and Policing), Economics, English Studies, Environmental Geography, Gender Equality and Social Justice, Geography, History, Liberal Arts, Mathematics, Native Studies, Philosophy, Political Science, Psychology, Religions and Cultures, Social Welfare and Social Development, and Sociology
- Bachelor of Business Administration (BBA)
- Bachelor of Fine Arts (BFA)
- Bachelor of Physical and Health Education (BPHE)
- Bachelor of Science (BSc) with majors in: Biology, Computer Science, Environmental Biology and Technology, Environmental and Physical Geography, Liberal Science, Mathematics, and Psychology
- Bachelor of Science in Nursing (BScN)
- Bachelor of Social Work (BSW)
- Bachelor of Arts (BA) or Bachelor of Science (BSc) combined with Bachelor of Commerce (Bcomm)
- Concurrent Bachelor of Arts (BA)/Bachelor of Education (BEd)
- Concurrent Bachelor of Business Administration (BBA)/Bachelor of Education (BEd)
- Concurrent Bachelor of Physical and Health Education (BPHE)/Bachelor of Education (BEd)
- Concurrent Bachelor of Science (BSc)/Bachelor of Education (BEd)

=== Graduate and professional programs ===
The following graduate and professional programs are offered at Nipissing University:

- Consecutive Bachelor of Education (BEd)
- Master of Arts (MA) in History
- Master of Arts (MA) in Sociology
- Master of Education (MEd)
- Master of Environmental Science (MESc)
- Master of Environmental Studies (MES)
- Master of Science (MSc) in Kinesiology
- Master of Science (MSc) in Mathematics
- PhD in Education (Educational Sustainability focus)

=== Additional credentials ===
Certificates are offered in:

- Aboriginal Leadership
- Applied Behaviour Analysis - Lifespan
- Bilingualism
- Digital Classics
- Digital Humanities
- Early Intensive Behaviour Intervention - Autism Spectrum Disorder
- Entrepreneurial Finance
- Environmental Management
- Financial Services
- Financial Product Sales Professional
- Forest Resource Management and Conservation
- Game Design and Development
- Geomatics
- Health Studies and Gerontology
- Human Resources Management
- iLEAD Business Experience
- Neuroscience
- Peace and Violence Prevention
- Program Evaluation and Applied Research

=== Joint programs ===
The following joint programs are offered through Nipissing University and Canadore College:

- The Bachelor of Arts in Criminology and Criminal Justice policing stream involves courses at Nipissing University and Canadore College, allowing students to obtain a college diploma and a university degree at the same time
- Students in the Bachelor of Arts Honours Specialization degree in Social Welfare and Social Development can also obtain a Social Service Worker college diploma from Canadore College while completing their university degree
- The Bachelor of Science in Nursing program has partnered with Canadore, allowing students to access Canadore's simulation labs
- The Environmental Technology and Science program offers students both a Bachelor of Science degree from Nipissing and an Environmental Technician - Protection and Compliance diploma from Canadore

== Student life ==
=== Student union ===
Nipissing University Student Union logo

The Nipissing University Student Union (NUSU) is the official body representing the student point of view at Nipissing. All students, both full-time and part-time, belong to the Student Union and fund the organization through their incidental fees. NUSU deals with many aspects of student life on campus, including the academic governance of the university and social events.

Nipissing University students are able to elect student executive representatives. These roles include: President, VP Governance & Legal Affairs, VP Finance, VP Communications, and VP Services.

The executives are also part of NUSU's Board of Directors, which includes another 10 student positions. The Directors-at-Large are part of the highest decision-making body of NUSU and hold accountable the executives to their job while making decisions on behalf of the student population.

NUSU's executives sit on Nipissing University's Board of Governors and Academic Senate. Elections are held annually for executive positions (paid), NUSU Board of Director positions (volunteer) and Student Senator positions (volunteer). NUSU's student membership belongs to the Canadian Federation of Students (CFS-Local 20).

=== Clubs and activities ===
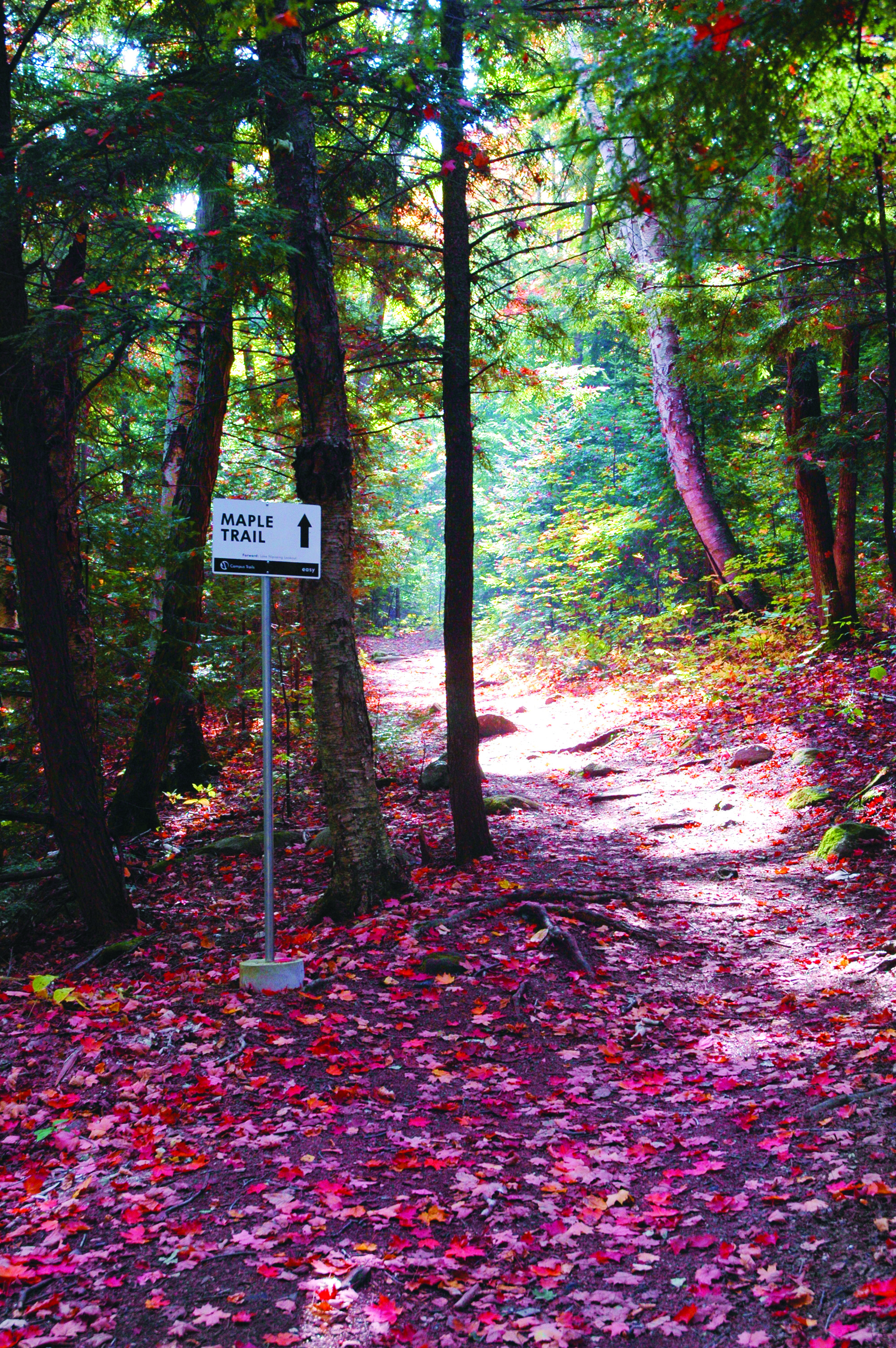
Nipissing University has over 20 km of trails that range in difficulty from easy to very difficult.

Nipissing University has a variety of clubs and activities. Clubs are sanctioned by NUSU and run by students. Common club categories include academics, recreation, volunteerism, current social topics, and religion.

Nipissing University has over 20 km of trails. These trails are accessible for hiking in the warmer months and for snowshoeing or cross-country skiing in the winter. Points of interest include the Lookout Tower and Duchesnay Falls.

Students at Nipissing may also partake in intramural sports, such as dodge ball, slo-pitch, and ultimate Frisbee. Fitness classes, which include Zumba, kickboxing, and yoga, are held in the R.J. Surtees Student Athletics Centre and vary by semester.

=== Work study ===
Nipissing University has a Work Study Program (called NUWork) that enables students with financial need to work part-time on campus. Students in the NUWork program are capped at a maximum of ten hours per week and have flexible hours to accommodate class schedules. The majority of work study jobs begin in September and may include positions such as research assistants, athletics facility staff, or technology service technicians. It is expected that students will have explored all possible funding options, including OSAP, before applying for this program.

== Residences ==
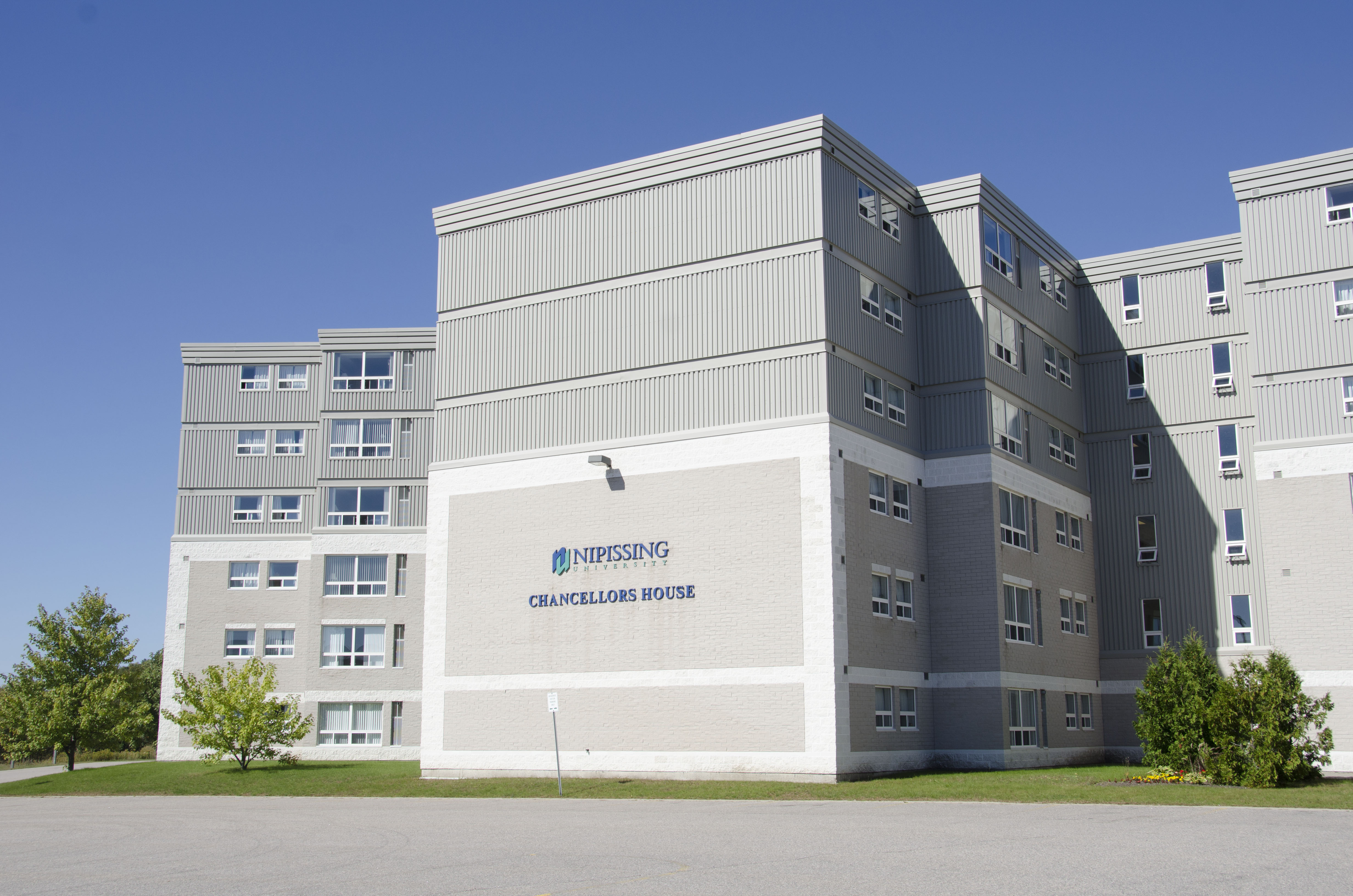
Chancellors House, one of Nipissing University's suite-style residence buildings

Nipissing University has four residence complexes: Chancellors House, Founders House, Governors House, and the Townhouse Residence Complex. Chancellors, Founders, and Governors are suite-style residences with four students per suite. First-year students coming directly from high school and who receive full-time admission are guaranteed a single room in one of these suite-style residences. The Townhouse Residence Complex is reserved for upper year students (second year and up). The townhouses have a six-bedroom floor plan and represent a stepping stone between the suite-style living and living off campus. All suites and townhouses have their own full kitchen. Each residence complex has a team of residence life student staff including residence dons, academic dons, residence office assistants, residents' council facilitators, and residents' council executives.

== Athletics ==
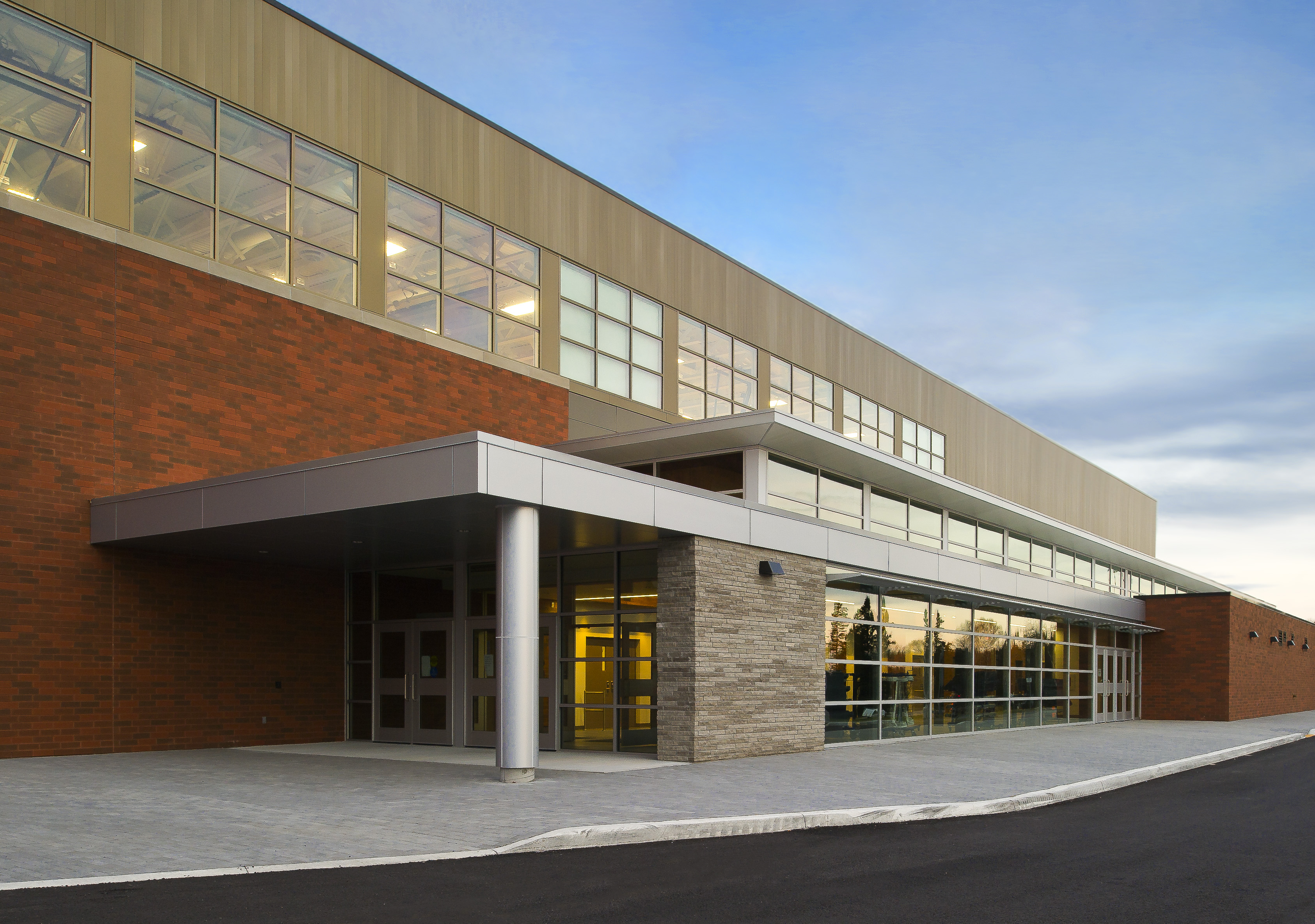
The Robert J. Surtees Athletic Centre officially opened in 2001, but has undergone multiple expansions over the years

The university is represented in the Ontario University Athletics and U Sports (formerly called "Canadian Interuniversity Sport") by the Nipissing Lakers. The school colours are green and blue and the mascot is Louie the Laker. The university offers seven varsity sports and five club sports. They include:

Varsity Sports

- Basketball
- Cross-country Running
- Volleyball
- Soccer
- Rowing
- Ice Hockey
- Nordic Skiing

Club Sports

- Lacrosse
- Ringette
- Squash
- Cheerleading
- Dance

Nipissing Athletics is housed in the Robert J. Surtees Student Athletics Centre, which has undergone multiple expansions since it opened in 2001. The Athletic Centre features three full-sized gymnasiums, two squash courts, three fitness studios, a weight room, and a cardio-weight room. The main gym, which hosts the varsity volleyball and basketball games, has a seating capacity of approximately 1200 people. The soccer pitch and Frisbee golf course are located behind the Athletic Centre. A main feature of the Athletic Centre is the Living Wall, a hydroponic green wall of plants that improves the air quality of the facility due to the oxygen it produces. Nipissing students also have access to a gym facility shared with Canadore College, which is located within the Main Campus building.

== Harris Learning Library ==
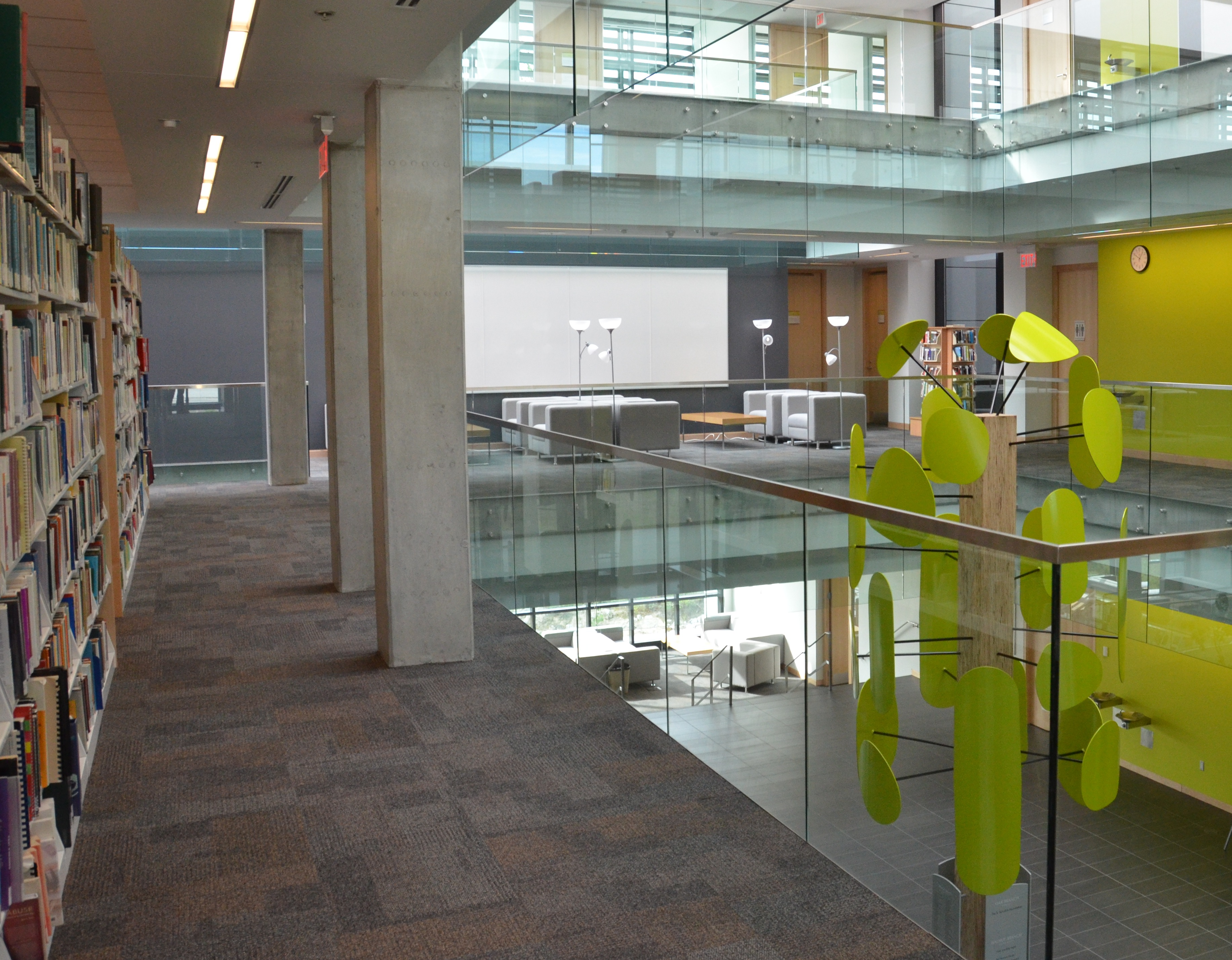
The Giving Tree won the Design Edge Canada Award in 2012

Nipissing University's Harris Learning Library, named in honour of former Ontario premier and North Bay Teachers' College alumnus Mike Harris, opened on June 20, 2011. In 2012, the Harris Learning Library received the American Library Association's Interior Design Award. The following year, the library was presented with a New Library Building Award from the Ontario Library Association for its architectural design. The Giving Tree, a two-story metal and engineered wood sculpture in the shape of a tree, won the Design Edge Canada Award in 2012. The sculpture stands in the foyer of the library and features the names of the library's donors.

Based at the North Bay campus, the Harris Learning Library's services extend to Canadore College, students located at Nipissing's Brantford Campus, online/distance students, and members of the community. The library welcomes approximately 169 000 visitors each year. On March 30, 2017, the library celebrated its one-millionth visitor.

The Harris Learning Library was not without controversy when it was named after Premier Harris. Many Indigenous people in the area raised concerns about celebrating Mr. Harris in light of his intervention with the events at Ipperwash.

== Research ==
Nipissing University continues to expand its research profile as researchers secure growing levels of funding for their work. Students and staff, with the help of The Office of Research Services, can apply for internal research grants or external grants from the three major granting agencies, NSERC, SSHRC, and CIHR. Nipissing University receives upwards of $350 000 annually from the Research Support Fund to help manage research endeavours at the school. Research facilities, centres, and laboratories at Nipissing University include:

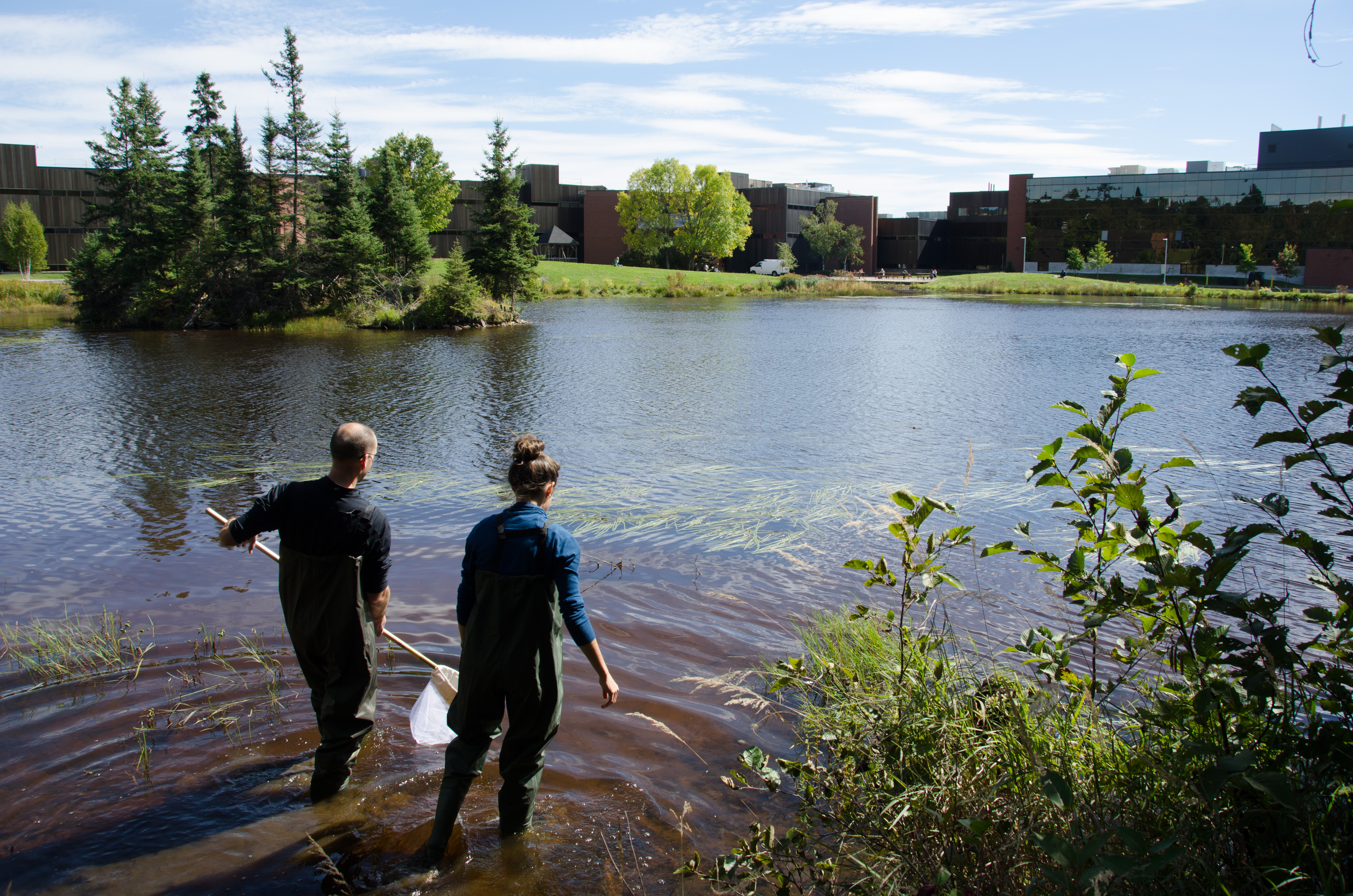
The pond behind Nipissing University is used as a natural laboratory. The nuclear magnetic resonance spectrometer is an analytical tool used for the determination of organic structures.

- Central Analytical Facility
- Analytical and Environmental Chemistry Laboratory
- Biomechanics and Ergonomics Laboratory
- Collaborative Systems Laboratory
- Centre for Literacy - Elizabeth Thorn
- Drosophila Laboratory - Genetics and Aging
- Evolution Laboratory
- Forest Resources Laboratory
- Geomatics Laboratory
- Integrative Watershed Research Centre (IWRC)
- Laboratory of Social Neuroendocrinology
- Nipissing Earth Observation Laboratory (NEOL)
- Nipissing University Greenhouse Complex
- Nipissing University Research on Neuroscience (NURON)
- Northern Canadian Centre for Research in Education and the Arts (NORCCEA)
- Northern Centre for Research on Aging and Communication
- Plant Ecology Research Laboratory (PERL)
- Plant Growth Facility
- Physics Laboratory
- Robotics Laboratory
- Salamander and Newt Research Laboratory
- Sensory Movement Behavioural Laboratory

Nipissing University hosts an annual Undergraduate Research Conference, to which student from all over Ontario attend. Students may present posters, papers, or art installations. Eligible scholarly works may include, but are not limited to: scientific experiments, case studies, interpretation of literature, or model design and development.

== Indigenous programs ==
Nipissing University has close ties with Indigenous Peoples of the area. The Office of Indigenous Initiatives aims to help all students reach success at university, whether or not they self-identify as Indigenous. Their services include: Student Success Programming and Advocacy, Enji Giigdoyang Student Lounge and Sacred Space, Elder in Residence program, Wiidooktaadwin Aboriginal Mentorship Initiatives, Debwendizon Annual Aboriginal Youth Education Gathering, Indigenous Week, Annual Welcome Powwow, and the Enji Giigdoyang Speaker Series.

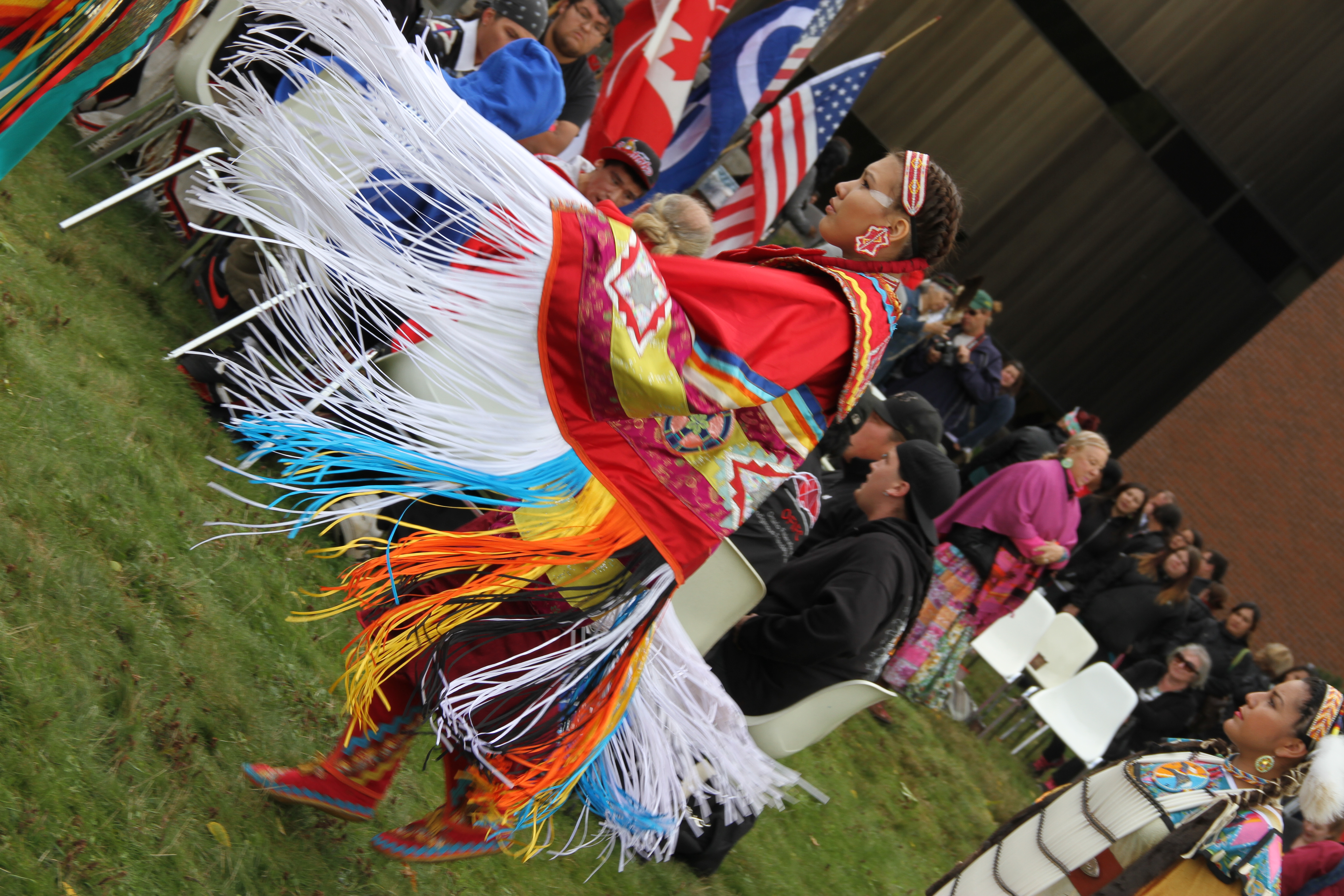
The Office of Indigenous Initiatives hosts a Welcome Powwow at the beginning of each academic year.

=== Aboriginal Advantage Program ===
The Aboriginal Advantage Program is a transition program for Indigenous students. It is offered to first year students, whether they are entering from high school, transferring from college, or are a mature student. The Aboriginal Advantage Program gives these students a taste of university by allowing them to earn up to 24 university credits while receiving academic and personal support.

=== Peer 2 Peer Aboriginal Mentorship Initiative ===
The Peer 2 Peer Aboriginal Mentorship Initiative at Nipissing University aims to connect upper year Indigenous students who are new to post-secondary education or those looking for additional resources and supports. Mentors provide academic and cultural support, answer questions about services for students, and attend university and community events with peers.

== Campuses ==
Nipissing University's main campus is a North Bay facility shared with Canadore College. It had a satellite campus in Brantford until 2019.

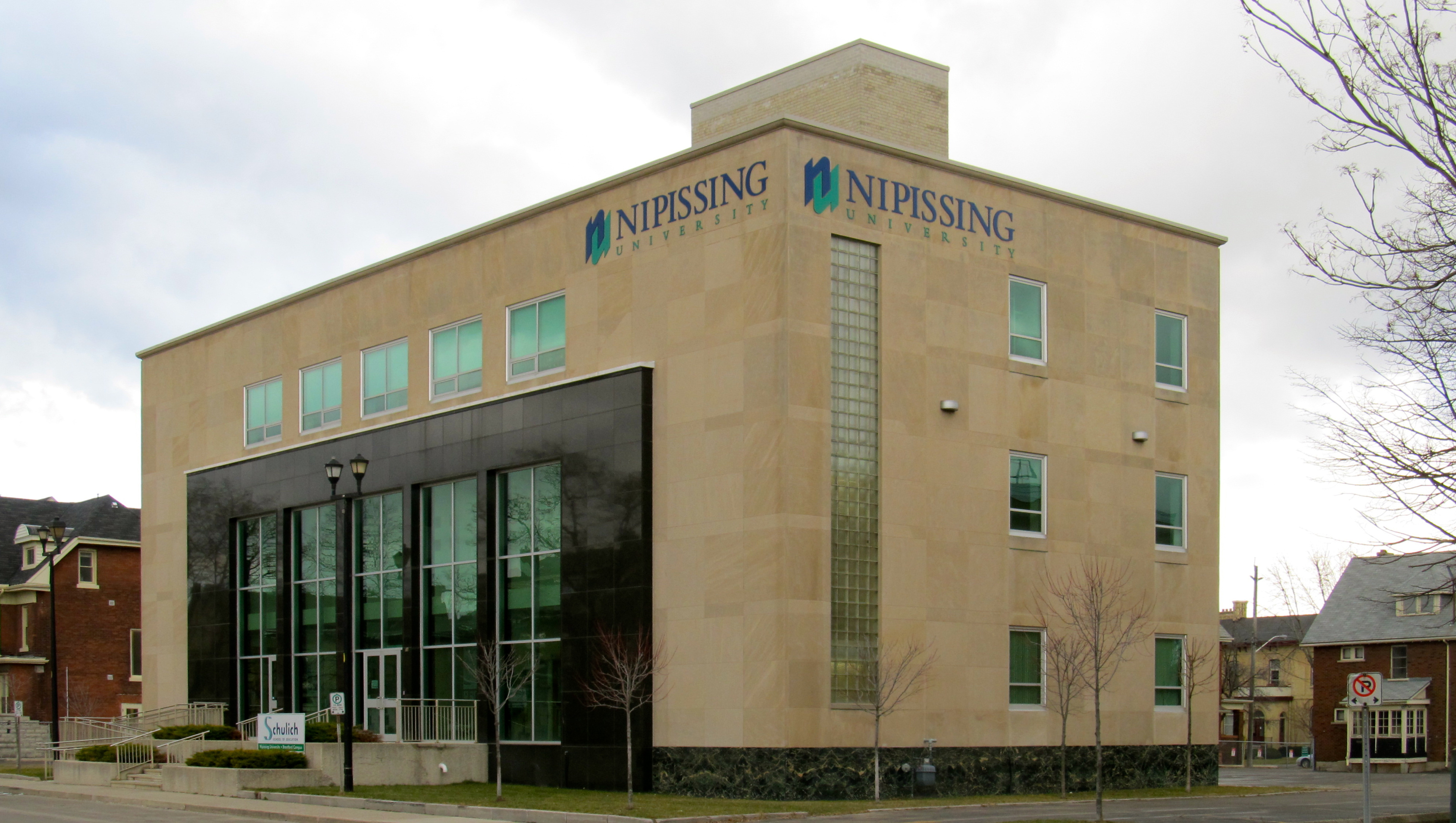
Nipissing University's Brantford campus

== Honorary doctorates ==
Nipissing University awards up to five honorary degrees each year. These degrees are awarded on the basis of national stature, contributions to Nipissing University, society, or scholarships, or academic background. Notable honorary doctors include:

- Tom Jenkins - Doctor of Letters
- Clint Malarchuk - Doctor of Letters
- Jeannette Corbiere Lavell - Doctor of Education
- Edmund Metatawabin - Doctor of Education
- Graeme Murray - Doctor of Education
- Vince Hawkes - Doctor of Letters
- Colin Simpson - Doctor of Letters
- Rush - Doctor of Music
- Giles Blunt - Doctor of Education
- Frances Lankin - Doctor of Education
- Harry LaForme - Doctor of Education
- Shelagh Rogers - Doctor of Education
- Craig Oliver - Doctor of Letters
- Paul Martin - Doctor of Education
- Bill Davis - Doctor of Education
- John Ralston Saul - Doctor of Letters
- Shawn Atleo - Doctor of Education
- Paul Quarrington - Doctor of Letters
- Mike Harris - Doctor of Letters
- Jon Dellandrea - Doctor of Letters
- David Onley - Doctor of Education
- Stephen Lewis - Doctor of Education
- Joseph Boyden - Doctor of Letters
- Roberta Jamieson - Doctor of Education
- Eric Schweig - Doctor of Education
- Maude Barlow - Doctor of Letters
- Harry Rosen - Doctor of Letters
- James Fraser Mustard - Doctor of Education
