= North Bay, Ontario =

North Bay
- City (single-tier)
- City of North Bay
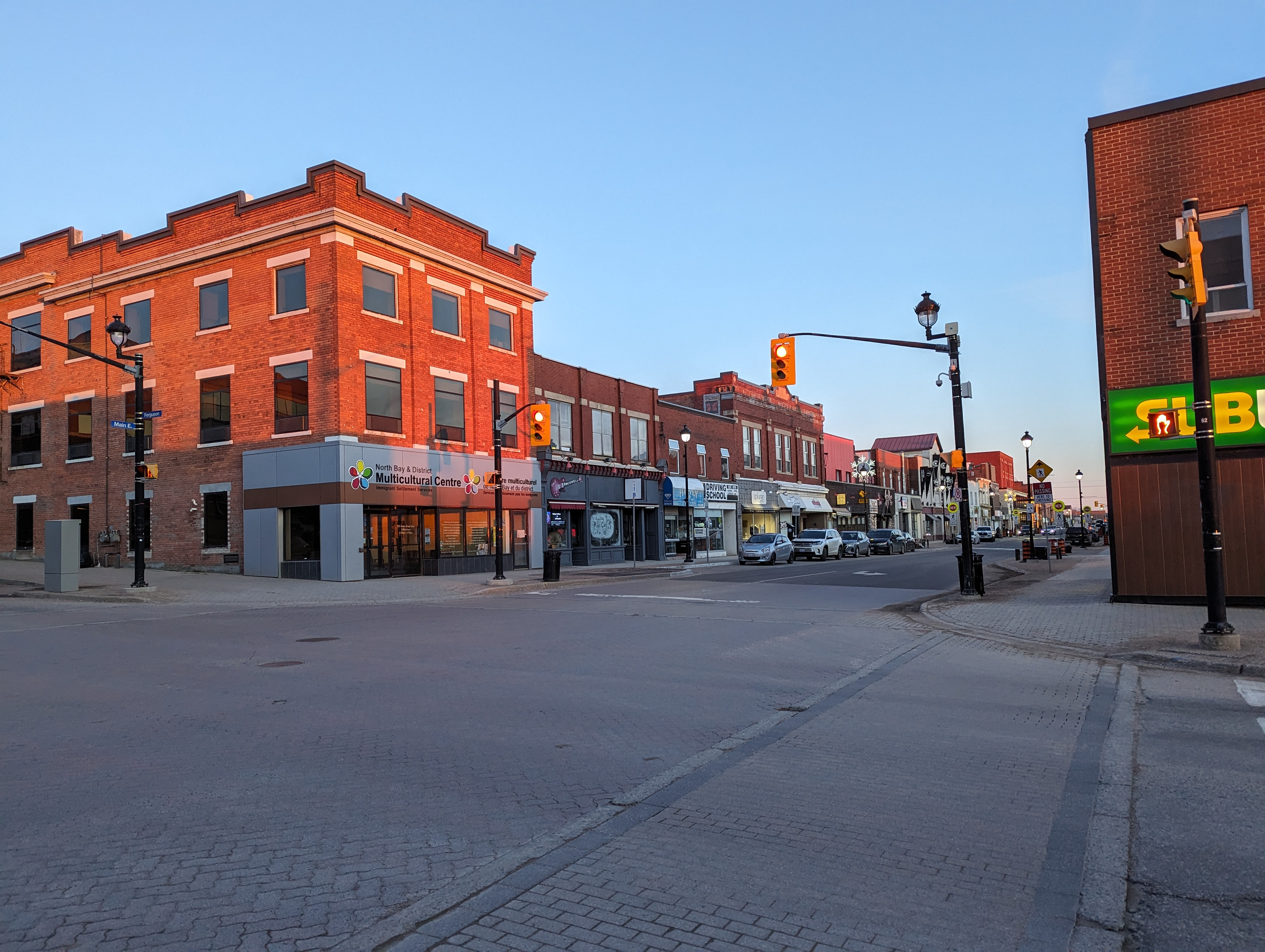
- Main Street

- Flag
- Nicknames: "Gateway to the North"
- Motto: Gateway of the North
- Location of North Bay, Ontario
- Coordinates: 46°18′33″N 79°27′41″W
- Country: Canada
- Province: Ontario
- District: Nipissing
- Established: 1891

Government
  - Type: City
  - Mayor: Maggie Horsfield
  - Governing Body: North Bay City Council
  - MP: Pauline Rochefort
  - MPP: Vic Fedeli

Area
  - Land: 315.53 km^{2} (121.83 sq mi)
  - Urban: 64.91 km^{2} (25.06 sq mi)
  - Metro: 5,314.85 km^{2} (2,052.08 sq mi)
- Elevation: 197 m (646 ft)

Population (2021)
  - Total: 52,662
  - Density: 166.9/km^{2} (432/sq mi)
  - Urban: 51,433
  - Urban density: 792.4/km^{2} (2,052/sq mi)
  - Metro: 71,736
  - Metro density: 13.5/km^{2} (35/sq mi)
- Time zone: UTC−5 (EST)
  - Summer (DST): UTC−4 (EDT)
- Forward sortation area: P1A to P1C
- Area codes: 705, 249, 683
- Highways: Highway 17 / TCH; Highway 11; Highway 63
- Website: northbay.ca

North Bay is a city in Northeastern Ontario, Canada. It is the seat of Nipissing District and takes its name from its position on the shore of Lake Nipissing. It developed as a railroad centre and its airport was an important military location during the Cold War.

== History ==
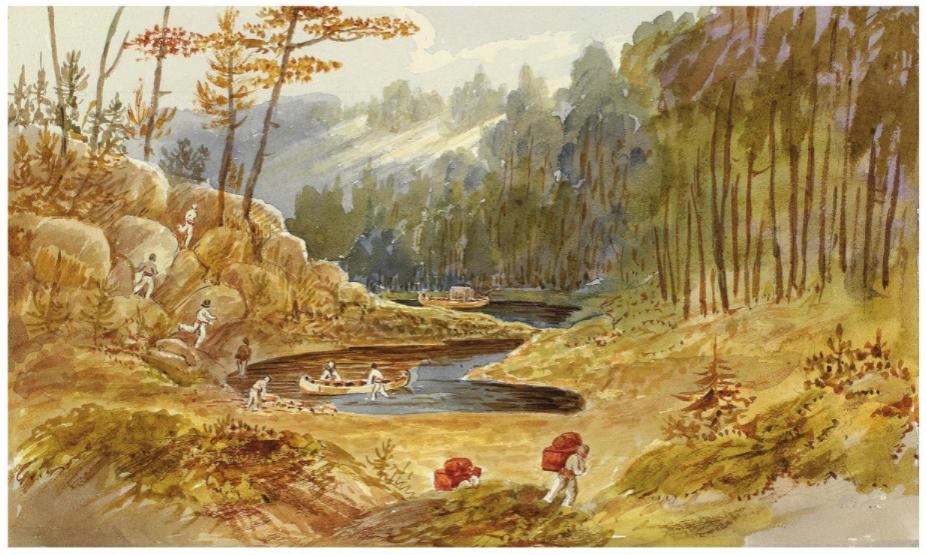
In 1821, official artist John Elliott Woolford recorded an expedition led by newly appointed Governor General George Ramsay, 9th Earl of Dalhousie, as it transited the portage that grew into North Bay.

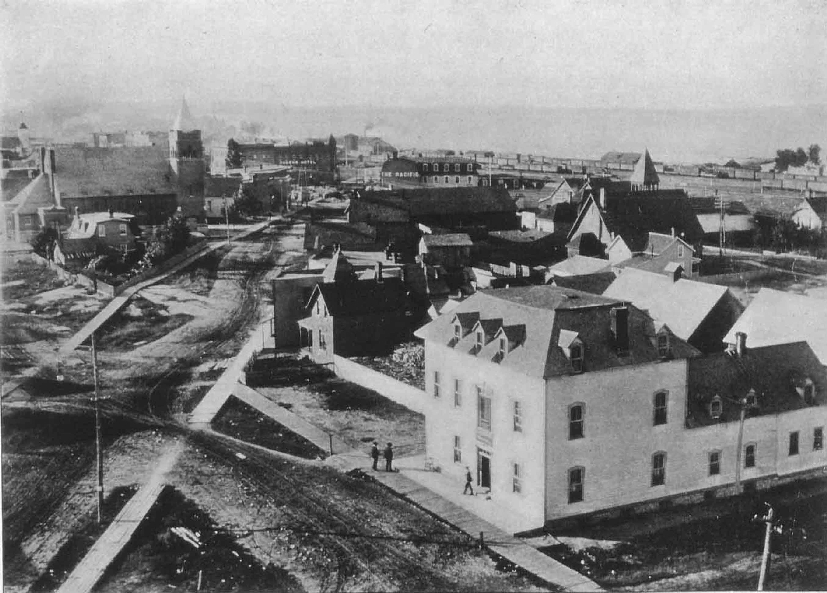
Downtown North Bay, 1905

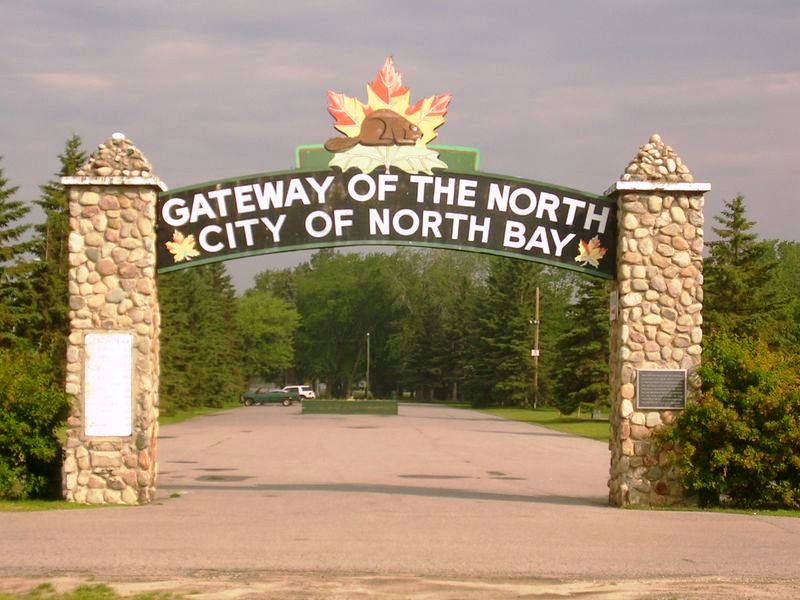
North Bay styles itself a gateway to Northern Ontario.

The site of North Bay is part of a historic canoe route where Samuel de Champlain took a party up the Ottawa River, through present-day Mattawa, on to Trout Lake and via the La Vase Creek to Lake Nipissing.

Apart from Indigenous people, voyageurs and surveyors, there was little activity in the Lake Nipissing area until the arrival of the Canadian Pacific Railway (CPR) in 1882.

That was the point where the Canada Central Railway (CCR) extension ended. The CCR was owned by Duncan McIntyre who amalgamated it with the CPR and became one of the handful of officers of the newly formed CPR. The CCR started in Brockville and extended to Pembroke. It then followed a westward route along the Ottawa River passing through places like Cobden, Deux-Rivières, and eventually to Mattawa at the confluence of the Mattawa and Ottawa Rivers. It then proceeded cross-country toward its final destination, Bonfield. Duncan McIntyre and his contractor James Worthington piloted the CCR expansion.

In 1882, John Ferguson decided that the north bay of Lake Nipissing was a promising spot for settlement. North Bay was incorporated as a town in 1891. The first mayor was John Bourke. More importantly, Bourke developed the western portion of North Bay after purchasing the interest of the Murray Brothers from Pembroke, who were large landholders in the new community. The land west of Klock Avenue (Algonquin Avenue) was known as the Murray block. Bourke Street is named after John Bourke. Murray Street is named after the Murrays.

North Bay was selected as the southern terminus of the Temiskaming and Northern Ontario Railway (T&NO) in 1902, when the Ross government took the bold move to establish a development road to serve the Haileybury settlement. During construction of the T&NO, silver was discovered at Cobalt and started a mining frenzy in the northern part of the province that continued for many years. The Canadian Northern Railway was subsequently built to North Bay in 1913.

In July 1894, an Act to Charter the Montreal, Ottawa and Georgian Bay Canal passed without a ripple of concern in North Bay. The Georgian Bay Canal was a mammoth transportation system that proposed to connect the Great Lakes with the Atlantic Ocean. The entire passageway from the Ottawa River to Lake Nipissing and down the French River to Georgian Bay was surveyed in the first decade of the 20th century. Financing was a large obstacle and, as time passed, transportation patterns changed and interfered with the earlier practicality of the giant venture. Despite this, there were groups who still hoped it would happen as late as 1930.

North Bay grew through a strong lumbering sector, mining and the three railways in the early days. The town benefited from strong community leadership and people like Richardson, Milne, McNamara, Englands, Browning, McDougal, Carruthers, McGaughey, George W. Lee, Senator Gordon, T. J. Patton, Charlie Harrison and many others are responsible for its development. In 1919, John Ferguson was elected mayor of North Bay and continued to serve as mayor until 1922. North Bay was incorporated as a city in August 1925.

The Dionne Quintuplets were born in Corbeil, Ontario, on the southern outskirts of North Bay in 1934. Their births had a tremendous impact on tourism in the area. For a province struggling against economic strangulation they were as valuable a resource as gold, nickel, pulpwood or hydro power. They saved an entire region from bankruptcy. They launched Northern Ontario's flourishing tourist industry. At their peak they represented a $500 million asset. North Bay and the surrounding area lived off this legacy well into the 1960s. Many visitors to the area discovered lakes and summer retreats that were easily accessible, and the businesses thrived on the tourist dollars.

In January 1968, the City of North Bay amalgamated with West Ferris and Widdifield townships.

In 1951, as a result of rising tensions in the Cold War, the Royal Canadian Air Force established an air base at North Bay, part of an expanding national air defence network to counter the threat of nuclear attack against North America by Soviet bombers. Construction of RCAF Station North Bay (in 1966 retitled "Canadian Forces Base North Bay" and in 1993 as "22 Wing/Canadian Forces Base North Bay") took three years, during which it became the largest industry in the community: a status it held for more than four decades. In October 1963, the North American Air Defence Command (NORAD) opened its Canadian operations centre at the base. Staffed by American as well as Canadian military personnel, the centre, situated 60 storeys underground to withstand a nuclear strike, monitored Canada's northern, east-central and Atlantic airspace, identifying and tracking all air traffic in this airspace, and responding to airborne emergencies, crime, and suspicious, unknown and potentially hostile aircraft. In 1983 this responsibility was expanded to all of Canada, and in October 2006 the base's NORAD operations (as of 1981, called North American Aerospace Defence Command) moved into a new, state-of-the-art facility above ground, where it continues to provide surveillance, identification and tracking of aircraft, and warning and response to emergencies, attacks and other crises, for the air sovereignty of Canada and North America. In summer of 2013, the base commenced surveillance of space via SAPPHIRE, Canada's first military satellite, that was launched into orbit from India in February.

Beginning in the 1990s, the base weathered a series of massive cuts by the federal government, and at one point was earmarked to close. Subsequently, a large portion of its infrastructure, including all of its airfield assets, such as hangars, fuel depot and control tower, were sold or demolished. By the 21st century, the base was no longer the city's top industry.

One by-product of the air base's creation in 1951 was the extension of the existing airport's runways to handle the largest military aircraft. The long runways at North Bay have been maintained as an alternate landing site for Toronto's Pearson International Airport and were used during the September 11 crisis as an emergency landing site for several international aircraft. It was also a designated emergency field for NASA's Space Transportation System, better known as the Space Shuttle.

On March 17, 2007, North Bay was announced as the winner of 2007 Kraft Hockeyville contest. North Bay received $50,000 to upgrade their local arena, Memorial Gardens, and also hosted an NHL pre-season game between the New York Islanders and the Atlanta Thrashers.

== Geography ==
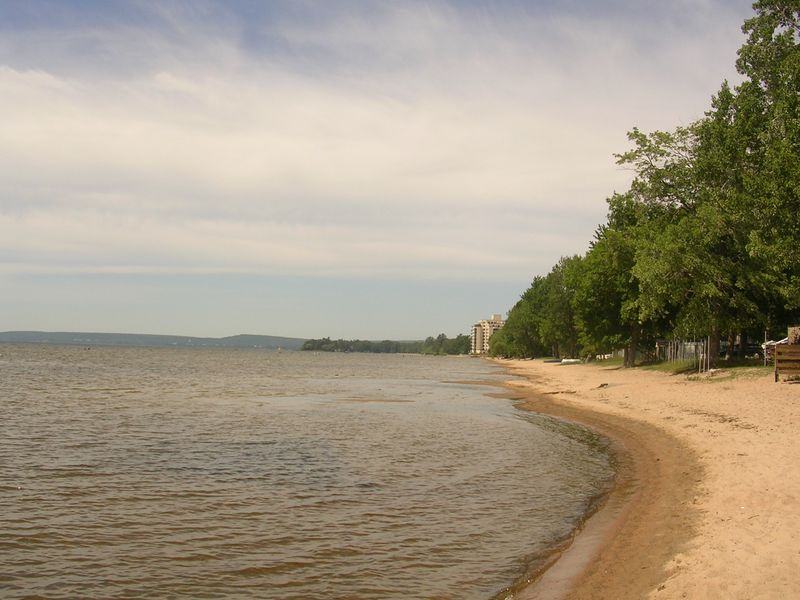
A beach on Lake Nipissing in West Ferris, a neighbourhood of North Bay

North Bay is located approximately 330 km (210 mi) north of Toronto, and differs in geography from Southern Ontario in that North Bay is situated on the Canadian Shield. This gives rise to a different and more rugged landscape.

North Bay is geographically unique in that it straddles both the Ottawa River watershed to the east and the Great Lakes Basin to the west. The city's urban core is located between Lake Nipissing and the smaller Trout Lake.

North Bay, critically situated at the junctions of Highway 11 and Highway 17, remains a major transportation centre for Northern Ontario. It is the southern terminus of the Ontario Northland Railway, and is served by the Jack Garland Airport.

The area of North Bay contains a number of ancient volcanic pipes, including the Manitou Islands and Callander Bay and many exposed dykes and five named batholiths (Timber Lake, Mulock, West Arm, Powassan and Bonfield).

=== Neighbourhoods ===
The city includes the neighbourhoods of:

- Birchaven
- Camp Champlain
- Champlain Park
- Cooks Mills
- Eastview
- Feronia
- Gateway
- Graniteville
- Hornell Heights
- Lounsbury
- Kenwood Hills
- Marshall Park
- P.J. Clowe Rotary Park
- Nipissing Junction
- Pinewood
- Sage
- Ski Club
- St. John's Village
- Sunset Park
- Thibeault Terrace
- Thorncliff
- Trout Mills
- Tweedsmuir
- Wallace Heights
- West Ferris
- Widdifield

=== Climate ===
The climate in North Bay is common to most places in Northern Ontario. North Bay tends to be a less humid climate than that found in Southern Ontario due somewhat to the distance from the Great Lakes and less warm than some other locations in Northern Ontario due to cooling from Lake Nipissing. On May 31, 2002, a tornado caused minor damage near the city. Two more tornadoes touched down on Lake Nipissing on August 20, 2009. This storm was a part of a chain of tornadoes that caused large amounts of damage in other parts of Ontario. The weather box below shows climate normals for the airport, at an elevation of 358 m, but the majority of the city, including the downtown core, sits at an elevation of 201 m.

The highest temperature ever recorded in North Bay was 37.2 °C (99 °F) on 1 July 1931. The coldest temperature ever recorded was −44.4 °C (−48 °F) on 26 January 1892.

Climate data for North Bay Airport, 1991–2020 normals, extremes 1887–present (Note: Extreme high and low temperatures in the climate table were recorded at North Bay from December 1887 to February 1982 and at North Bay Airport from March 1982 to present.)
Month	Jan	Feb	Mar	Apr	May	Jun	Jul	Aug	Sep	Oct	Nov	Dec	Year
Record high °C (°F)	12.8 (55.0)	12.8 (55.0)	27.2 (81.0)	29.9 (85.8)	32.2 (90.0)	36.1 (97.0)	37.2 (99.0)	35.4 (95.7)	34.4 (93.9)	27.8 (82.0)	23.6 (74.5)	16.0 (60.8)	37.2 (99.0)
Mean maximum °C (°F)	4.4 (39.9)	4.9 (40.8)	11.7 (53.1)	20.1 (68.2)	27.3 (81.1)	29.4 (84.9)	30.1 (86.2)	29.4 (84.9)	26.6 (79.9)	21.8 (71.2)	13.4 (56.1)	6.6 (43.9)	31.4 (88.5)
Mean daily maximum °C (°F)	−7.4 (18.7)	−5.6 (21.9)	0.7 (33.3)	8.6 (47.5)	17.0 (62.6)	22.0 (71.6)	24.3 (75.7)	23.1 (73.6)	18.5 (65.3)	10.6 (51.1)	3.1 (37.6)	−3.8 (25.2)	9.3 (48.7)
Daily mean °C (°F)	−12.3 (9.9)	−10.8 (12.6)	−4.5 (23.9)	3.4 (38.1)	11.4 (52.5)	16.6 (61.9)	19.0 (66.2)	18.0 (64.4)	13.4 (56.1)	6.5 (43.7)	−0.6 (30.9)	−7.8 (18.0)	4.4 (39.9)
Mean daily minimum °C (°F)	−17.3 (0.9)	−15.9 (3.4)	−9.6 (14.7)	−1.8 (28.8)	5.7 (42.3)	11.1 (52.0)	13.7 (56.7)	12.8 (55.0)	8.3 (46.9)	2.3 (36.1)	−4.3 (24.3)	−11.7 (10.9)	−0.6 (30.9)
Mean minimum °C (°F)	−31.1 (−24.0)	−28.6 (−19.5)	−23.7 (−10.7)	−11.8 (10.8)	−2.1 (28.2)	3.2 (37.8)	7.7 (45.9)	6.1 (43.0)	0.2 (32.4)	−5.4 (22.3)	−15.2 (4.6)	−26.0 (−14.8)	−33.0 (−27.4)
Record low °C (°F)	−44.4 (−47.9)	−42.8 (−45.0)	−37.2 (−35.0)	−21.7 (−7.1)	−9.4 (15.1)	−6.1 (21.0)	−2.2 (28.0)	0.0 (32.0)	−5 (23)	−12.8 (9.0)	−26.6 (−15.9)	−43.3 (−45.9)	−44.4 (−47.9)
Average precipitation mm (inches)	69.5 (2.74)	54.4 (2.14)	60.2 (2.37)	72.1 (2.84)	88.7 (3.49)	90.8 (3.57)	98.2 (3.87)	93.1 (3.67)	113.9 (4.48)	109.0 (4.29)	96.7 (3.81)	73.1 (2.88)	1,019.7 (40.15)
Average rainfall mm (inches)	21.5 (0.85)	12.5 (0.49)	29.2 (1.15)	57.8 (2.28)	86.6 (3.41)	94.1 (3.70)	101.0 (3.98)	88.7 (3.49)	114.5 (4.51)	101.7 (4.00)	67.1 (2.64)	22.9 (0.90)	797.6 (31.40)
Average snowfall cm (inches)	70.0 (27.6)	63.3 (24.9)	39.2 (15.4)	18.1 (7.1)	3.6 (1.4)	0.2 (0.1)	0.0 (0.0)	0.0 (0.0)	0.1 (0.0)	8.8 (3.5)	38.2 (15.0)	71.0 (28.0)	312.4 (123.0)
Average precipitation days (≥ 0.2 mm)	18.4	15.0	12.4	12.4	13.3	13.1	12.3	12.2	14.0	15.9	17.6	18.9	175.4
Average rainy days (≥ 0.2 mm)	4.4	2.1	5.2	9.7	13.4	13.4	12.7	12.0	14.1	14.2	10.1	4.8	115.9
Average snowy days (≥ 0.2 cm)	17.9	15.7	10.1	5.2	1.1	0.05	0.0	0.0	0.17	3.0	11.4	17.9	82.4
Average relative humidity (%) (at 15:00 LST)	74.6	66.9	57.9	53.0	51.2	56.0	57.3	60.2	64.6	67.5	76.2	78.7	63.7
Average dew point °C (°F)	−14.8 (5.4)	−14.1 (6.6)	−9.9 (14.2)	−3.8 (25.2)	3.9 (39.0)	10.5 (50.9)	13.5 (56.3)	13.1 (55.6)	9.7 (49.5)	2.9 (37.2)	−3.2 (26.2)	−9.8 (14.4)	−0.1 (31.8)
Mean monthly sunshine hours	86.4	116.5	151.0	190.5	235.2	245.8	266.1	224.8	154.4	118.3	64.6	69.0	1,922.4
Percentage possible sunshine	30.8	40.1	41.0	46.9	50.7	52.1	55.8	51.2	40.9	34.9	22.7	25.7	41.1
Source 1: Environment Canada (sunshine 1981–2010)
Source 2: weatherstats.ca (for dewpoint and monthly&yearly average absolute maximum&minimum temperature)

== Demographics ==
Historical populations

Year	Pop.	±%
1891	2,210	—
1901	2,350	+6.3%
1911	7,737	+229.2%
1921	10,692	+38.2%
1931	15,528	+45.2%
1941	15,411	−0.8%

Year	Pop.	±%
1951	17,944	+16.4%
1961	23,781	+32.5%
1971	49,187	+106.8%
1981	51,268	+4.2%
1991	55,405	+8.1%
1996	54,332	−1.9%

Year	Pop.	±%
2001	52,771	−2.9%
2006	53,966	+2.3%
2011	53,651	−0.6%
2016	51,553	−3.9%
2021	52,662	+2.2%

In January 1968, the City of North Bay amalgamated with West Ferris and Widdifield townships.

In the 2021 Census of Population conducted by Statistics Canada, North Bay had a population of 52,662 living in 23,467 of its 25,077 total private dwellings, a change of 2.2% from its 2016 population of 51,553. With a land area of 315.53 km^{2} (121.83 sq mi), it had a population density of 166.9/km^{2} (432.3/sq mi) in 2021.

North Bay census agglomeration population was 71,736 as of 2021, with a land area of 5,314.85 square kilometres (2,052.08 sq mi).

=== Ethnicity ===
Largest ethnic origin in North Bay CA by census tract based on the 2021 census

The most common ethnicities in North Bay as per the 2021 census are French (23.8%), Irish (23.3%), English (23.3%), Scottish (19.2%), Canadian (16.9%), German (10.9%), Italian (6.9%), First Nations (3.8%).

In 2021, 11.7% of the population was Indigenous, compared to 5.0% nationally. 4.4% of residents were visible minorities compared to 26.5% nationally. The remaining 83.9% of the population was white/European. The largest visible minority groups in North Bay were South Asian (1.4%), Black (1.1%), and Chinese (0.5%).

Panethnic groups in the City of North Bay (2001–2021)
Panethnic group	2021		2016		2011		2006		2001	
Panethnic group	Pop.	%	Pop.	%	Pop.	%	Pop.	%	Pop.	%
European (Note: Statistic includes all persons that did not make up part of a visible minority or an indigenous identity.)	43,700	84.93%	43,325	86.01%	46,890	89.42%	48,885	91.83%	48,860	94.18%
Indigenous	5,515	10.72%	5,415	10.75%	4,185	7.98%	3,205	6.02%	2,320	4.47%
South Asian	710	1.38%	415	0.82%	280	0.53%	240	0.45%	105	0.2%
African	565	1.1%	290	0.58%	365	0.7%	350	0.66%	275	0.53%
East Asian (Note: Statistic includes total responses of "Chinese", "Korean", and "Japanese" under visible minority section on census.)	340	0.66%	430	0.85%	365	0.7%	310	0.58%	185	0.36%
Southeast Asian (Note: Statistic includes total responses of "Filipino" and "Southeast Asian" under visible minority section on census.)	245	0.48%	175	0.35%	75	0.14%	90	0.17%	125	0.24%
Latin American	140	0.27%	130	0.26%	110	0.21%	30	0.06%	15	0.03%
Middle Eastern (Note: Statistic includes total responses of "West Asian" and "Arab" under visible minority section on census.)	130	0.25%	55	0.11%	45	0.09%	10	0.02%	10	0.02%
Other/multiracial (Note: Statistic includes total responses of "Visible minority, n.i.e." and "Multiple visible minorities" under visible minority section on census.)	115	0.22%	150	0.3%	130	0.25%	125	0.23%	10	0.02%
Total responses	51,455	97.71%	50,370	97.71%	52,440	97.74%	53,235	98.65%	51,880	98.31%
Total population	52,662	100%	51,553	100%	53,651	100%	53,966	100%	52,771	100%
Note: Totals greater than 100% due to multiple origin responses

=== Language ===
In 2021, 81.1% of the population spoke English as their mother tongue. French was the first language of 11.3% of residents, compared to 3.3% in all of Ontario. In terms of non-official languages, the most common were Italian (0.6%), Chinese languages (0.3%), German (0.3%), and Spanish (0.3%). 2.2% of residents listed both English and French as mother tongues, while 0.7% listed both English and a non-official language.

Canada Census Mother Tongue - North Bay, Ontario
Census	Total	English			French			English & French			Other		
Year	Responses	Count	Trend	Pop %	Count	Trend	Pop %	Count	Trend	Pop %	Count	Trend	Pop %
2021	51,935	42,130	▲2.1%	81.1%	5,880	▼11.5%	11.3%	1,165	▲65.2%	2.2%	2,350	▲9.3%	4.5%
2016	50,930	41,255	▼2.8%	81.0%	6,645	▼10.6%	13.0%	705	▲21.6%	1.4%	2,150	▼2.5%	4.2%
2011	52,850	42,440	▲1.1%	80.3%	7,435	▼7.5%	14.1%	580	▲43.2%	1.1%	2,205	▼21.5%	4.2%
2006	53,235	41,985	▲1.7%	78.9%	8,040	▲3.5%	15.1%	405	▼50.6%	0.8%	2,810	▲39.8%	5.3%
2001	51,885	41,280	▼2.5%	79.6%	7,770	▼3.4%	15.0%	820	▲59.2%	1.6%	2,010	▼13.4%	3.9%
1996	53,490	42,345	n/a	79.2%	8,045	n/a	15.0%	515	n/a	1.0%	2,320	n/a	4.3%

=== Religion ===
Largest non-Christian religion in North Bay CA by census tract based on the 2021 census

56.3% of residents were Christian, down from 73.2% in 2011. 35.2% were Catholic, 13.2% were Protestant, 4.1% were Christian n.o.s and 3.8% belonged to other Christian denominations and Christian-related traditions. 41.6% of the population were non-religious or secular, up from 25.4% in 2011. All other religions made up 2.0% of the population. The largest non-Christian religion was Hinduism (0.5%).

== Economy ==
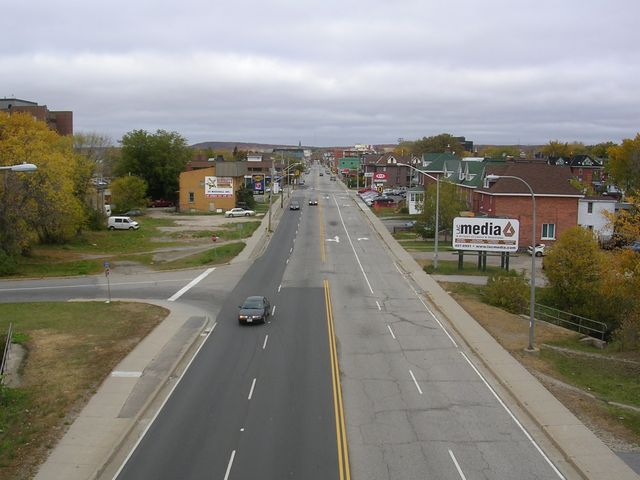
Looking northwest down Main Street, from a pedestrian/cyclist overpass near Chippewa Creek

North Bay is more economically diverse than many other Northern Ontario communities, although a large percentage of the city's jobs are public sector in nature with health, education and government dominating the list of the city's top employers.

North Bay is the home of Nipissing University, founded in 1992 (previous name North Bay Normal School 1909–1953, North Bay Teachers College 1953–1973, Nipissing University affiliated to Laurentian University 1973–1992, independent public university separated from Laurentian University in 1992), and of Canadore College, founded in 1967. Approximately 10,000 full-time students (and thousands more part-time students) are enrolled at the two post-secondary institutions, which share a campus in the northwest end of the city.

Between the early 1950s and 1990s, 22 Wing/Canadian Forces Base North Bay was the community's leading industry. The cuts to the base by the federal government mentioned above, plus dramatic reductions in the number of its personnel — at one time, there were 2,200 military members and civilian employees; in 2013, about 750 remained — has resulted in a loss of tens of millions of dollars to the community, an impact felt by all North Bay's business sectors.

North Bay is also home to The Algonquin Regiment (Northern Pioneers), A Coy, a Canadian Force Army Reserve unit. B Coy of The Algonquin Regiment (Northern Pioneers) is located in Timmins.

The service industry, tourism, and transportation also play a significant role in the city's economy, as well as primary industry companies. It is estimated that North Bay has more than 65 companies that offer mining supplies and services, employing almost 3,000 residents.

== Arts and culture ==
In recent years, the city's cultural scene has expanded due to its community of artists, musicians, actors and writers. In 2004, the TVOntario program Studio 2 named North Bay as one of the top three most artistically talented communities in the province.

=== Film and television ===
The city has hosted film productions. In 1942, Captains of the Clouds was filmed in North Bay at the height of the Second World War. The film starred James Cagney as a Canadian bush pilot and also featured an appearance of famed fighter pilot Billy Bishop. The city has continued to host film productions, including the 2013 horror film The Colony starring Laurence Fishburne and Bill Paxton, and the drama Still Mine, featuring James Cromwell in an award-winning role. Another film production that occurred in North Bay was the 2014 thriller film Backcountry.

In August 2009, the comedy troupe The Kids in the Hall began filming their mini-series Death Comes to Town on location in North Bay. More recently, the city hosted production of the third season of Hard Rock Medical.

The city is fictionalised as "Algonquin Bay" in the mystery novels of North Bay native Giles Blunt, beginning with Forty Words for Sorrow. The television series adaptation Cardinal was filmed in both North Bay and Sudbury in 2016.

In 2017, the crime drama series Carter was filmed in the city.

In 2021, the reality series Call Me Mother was filmed in North Bay.

In 2022, North Star Studios announced the acquisition of a building in the West Ferris Industrial Park, which will provide 68,000 square feet of film and television studio space.

== Attractions ==
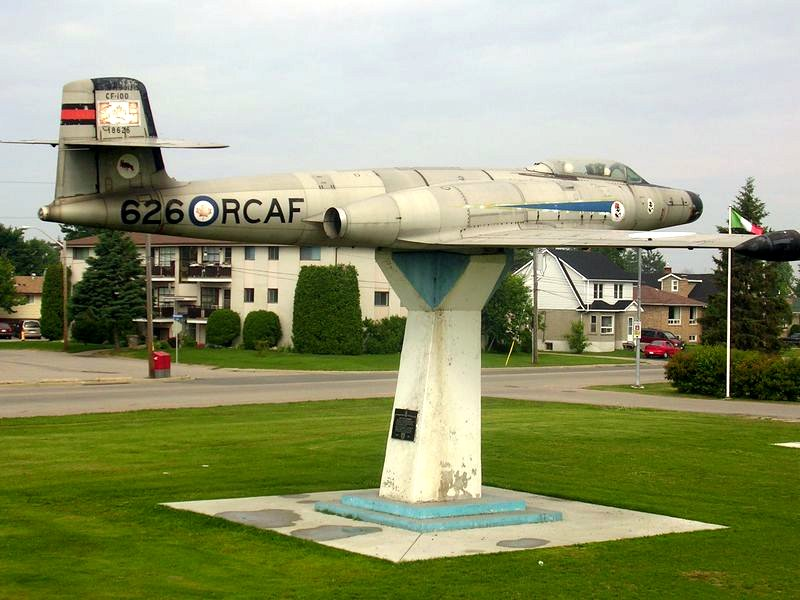
A CF-100 on display at Lee Park

North Bay has many areas available for recreation and leisure, including over 72 sports fields and parks, a marina on Lake Nipissing that holds 270 boats, a number of trails and beach access points on both Lake Nipissing and Trout Lake.

=== Waterfront development ===
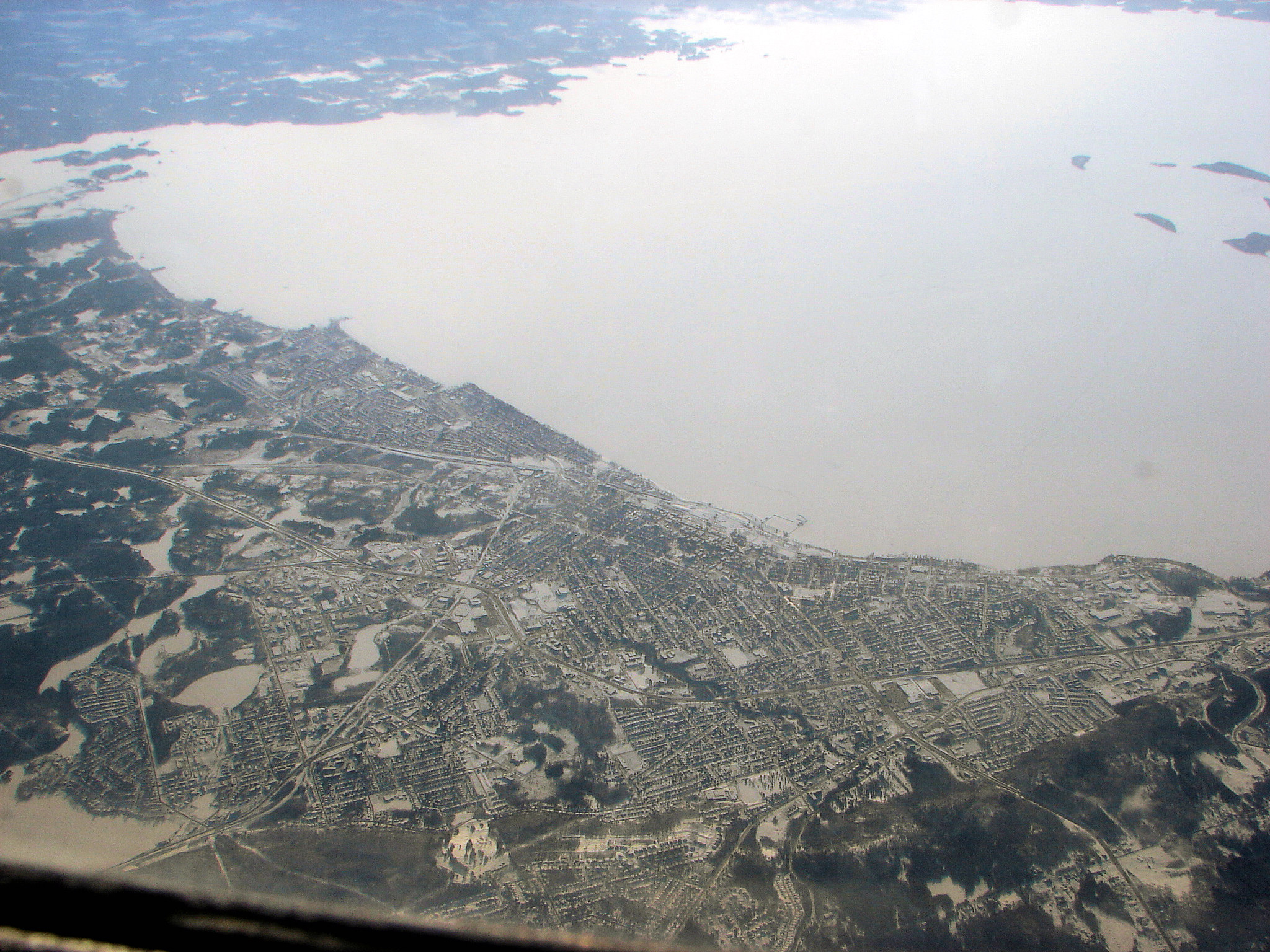
Aerial view of North Bay and Lake Nipissing

In the 1980s a mile-long waterfront park/promenade was developed along the Lake Nipissing shoreline adjacent to the downtown core. Eventually, such attractions as a mini-train ride and two antique carousels (largely crafted by local artisans) were installed and quickly became very popular with tourists and locals alike. Now, work is beginning on a large new multi-faceted community park that will be developed on the former Canadian Pacific Railway yards that separated the downtown core from the existing waterfront park. In August 2009, a pedestrian and cycling underpass opened, providing a direct connection between downtown North Bay and the Lake Nipissing waterfront beneath the railway tracks. As part of the ongoing redevelopment of the former railway lands, the Rotary Clubs of North Bay and North Bay-Nipissing spearheaded the creation of a splash pad behind the North Bay Museum, which opened in August 2019, followed by an accessible playground in August 2024.

== Sports ==
Sports teams include:

- North Bay Battalion, a team in the Ontario Hockey League, which relocated to North Bay before the 2013–2014 season.
- North Bay Bulldogs, a team in the Northern Football Conference, which relocated to North Bay in 1991.

== Transportation ==
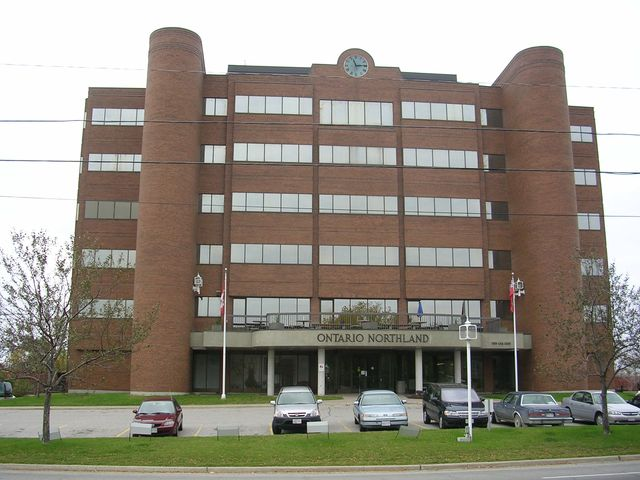
The headquarters of the Ontario Northland Transportation Commission in North Bay

North Bay is located at the easternmost junction of Highway 11 and Highway 17, which are both segments of the Trans-Canada Highway. The two highways share a single route through the city core, between Algonquin Avenue and an interchange at Twin Lakes, along an urban limited-access road with reduced but not fully controlled access. Major arterial streets intersect directly with the highway, while minor streets end at a network of service roads connecting them to the arterials. At Algonquin Avenue, Highway 17 continues westward to Sturgeon Falls and Sudbury, while Highway 11 heads north toward Temiskaming Shores. At the eastern interchange, Highway 17 heads eastward toward Mattawa, Pembroke and Ottawa, while Highway 11 widens into a freeway and heads southerly toward Barrie and Toronto.

Highway 11 and Highway 17 both formerly had business spur routes through downtown North Bay, Highway 11B and Highway 17B, although both have been decommissioned by the province and are now designated only as city streets. North Bay is also served by Highway 63, a route which extends northeasterly from the city toward Thorne, where it crosses the Ottawa River and becomes Quebec Route 101.

Due to the steep incline of Algonquin Avenue/Highway 11 as it enters North Bay from the north on Thibeault Hill, the southbound lanes are equipped with the only runaway truck ramp on Ontario's provincial highway system.

North Bay is served by the North Bay/Jack Garland Airport, which also receives and services military flights on behalf of the adjacent CFB North Bay, is home to Canadore College Aviation Campus, and site of numerous aviation companies, including Voyageur Airways and the Bombardier Aerospace CL-415 water bomber final assembly and flight testing facility.

Intercity bus service in the city operates from the North Bay railway station on Station Road.

The city operates a public transit system, North Bay Transit.

== Police ==
The North Bay Police Service was founded in 1882, and is overseen by the North Bay City Council's Police Services Board. In 2018, it had a budget of C$18.6 Million.

== Education ==
North Bay has educational programs ranging from pre-school to university.

=== Post-secondary schools ===
- Nipissing University
- Canadore College
- Modern College
- Canadian Career College

=== School boards ===
- Near North District School Board
- Nipissing-Parry Sound Catholic District School Board
- Conseil scolaire de district catholique Franco-Nord
- Conseil scolaire de district du Nord-Est de l'Ontario

== Media ==
The local newspaper is the North Bay Nugget, which is published in print form from Tuesday through Saturday.

CKNY-DT is an owned-and-operated television station of CTV. Part of the CTV Northern Ontario subsystem, CKNY functions largely as a rebroadcaster of CICI-TV in Greater Sudbury, although news reporters in North Bay provide content to CTV Northern Ontario's newscasts. In May 2020, its local studio on Oak Street was closed, and its staff was reduced to two reporters and a cameraman/editor, all of whom now working remotely. The local Cogeco Cable system operates a community channel under the YourTV branding, which produces a slate of local newscasts under the Cogeco News branding.

== Notable people ==
- Ahren Belisle, stand-up comedian
- Giles Blunt, author
- Mike Bolan, former Liberal MP, Superior Court judge
- Kirsten Bos, researcher of ancient DNA
- Gerald Bull, aerospace engineer, expert in ballistics, assassinated
- Amanda Burk, artist
- Chuck Cadman, politician and member of Parliament
- Jessica Cameron, actress
- Harvey Charters, silver medalist at 1936 Olympics in canoeing
- Mike Conroy, WHA hockey player
- Billy Coutu, NHL hockey player
- Ab DeMarco Sr, former NHL hockey player
- Nick Denis, former mixed martial arts fighter and biochemist
- Kevin Frankish, Toronto-area media personality. He co-hosts Breakfast Television on City.
- Bobby Gimby, orchestra leader, singer/songwriter who wrote the Canadian Centennial song
- Mike Harris, former Premier of Ontario
- Alison Herst, Olympian (Kayak: 1992 Barcelona; 1996 Atlanta)
- High Holy Days, rock music group
- Bill Houlder, former NHL player
- Troy Hurtubise, inventor
- Sam Jacks, inventor of Ringette and Floor hockey
- Byron M. Jones, Christian movie producer and managing partner of Pure Flix Entertainment
- Gordon Kannegiesser, former NHL player
- Sheldon Kannegiesser, former NHL player
- Larry Keenan, former NHL player
- Sean Kelly, glam-rock guitarist and vocalist
- Pierre LeBrun, hockey journalist
- Cory Marks, country rock singer
- Steve McLaren, former NHL/AHL player
- Lise Meloche, Olympian (Biathlon: 1992 Albertville; 1994 Lillehammer)
- Gerry Mendicino, actor
- Keke Mortson, WHA hockey player, North Bay Sports Hall of Fame inductee
- Claude Noël, former NHL head coach for the Winnipeg Jets
- Bryan Lee O'Malley, cartoonist, creator and author of the Scott Pilgrim series of graphic novels
- Mike O'Shea, CFL head coach for the Winnipeg Blue Bombers, and former CFL linebacker
- Barbara Olmsted, Olympian (Canoeing: 1984 Los Angeles (Bronze); 1988 Seoul)
- Nancy Olmsted, Olympian (Canoeing: 1984 Los Angeles; 1988 Seoul)
- Steve Omischl, world champion, freestyle skiing aerials
- Kate Pace, world downhill alpine ski champion
- Pete Palangio, former NHL player
- Tony Poeta, former NHL player
- Denis Rancourt, scientist, educational reform activist, former physics professor at the University of Ottawa
- Julia Rivard, Olympic athlete (canoe/kayak), business leader
- Craig Rivet, former NHL player
- Anthony Rota, MP and former Speaker of the House of Commons
- Jim Sherrit, WHA hockey player, AVCO cup winner, North Bay Sports Hall of Fame inductee
- Steve Shields, former NHL goalie
- Colin Simpson, author
- Katherine E. Stange, mathematician
- Lance Storm, professional wrestler
- Scott Thompson, comedic actor
- Kenneth Thomson, 2nd Baron Thomson of Fleet
- Darren Turcotte, former NHL player
- Jim Watson, actor
- Mike Yeo, former St. Louis Blues Head Coach

== Sister cities ==
- Moncton, New Brunswick

== See also ==
- List of francophone communities in Ontario
