= Confederation Secondary School =

Canadian intermediate and secondary school, opened 1967

Location
- Val Caron, Ontario; Canada; 46.6106°N 81.0205°W

Information
- Enrolment: 603
- Website: https://confedss.rainbowschools.ca/

Confederation Secondary School is an intermediate and secondary school, serving grades 7 to 12, in Val Caron, Ontario, Canada. Enrollment as of December 2025 is 603.

== History ==
Confederation S.S. was built as a Canadian Centennial project, and opened in September 1967, making it the first English secondary school in Valley East, Ontario.

== Football ==
The mascot for Confederation sports is the Charger, a fictional creature reminiscent to a lion.

Its football program began in 1968 with a Junior Program but, due to financial constraints and a serious injury to a player, the team was discontinued in the mid-1980s. Confederation was without football from that time until the fall of 2002 when it fielded a varsity team which posted a 2–4 record in its first season. This was considered an accomplishment as the last expansion team of Sudbury District Secondary School Athletic Association, the St. Benedict Catholic Secondary School Bears, had to wait a full seven seasons before their first win.

The Chargers have become a regular member of the post-season. In 2003, they made the playoffs for the first time and knocked off the perennial powerhouse St. Charles College Cardinals by a score of 30–16. They then handed the previously undefeated Lasalle Secondary School Lancers their only loss of the season in the championship game by a score of 14-7. Interest in football all across Greater Sudbury then spiked as several high schools hoped to duplicate Confederation's success.

The Sudbury Secondary School Northstars took the field for the first time in over 20 years in 2003 but were unable to match the Chargers' success, going winless in three of four seasons and folding in 2007. To replace them that fall was the Lively District Secondary School Hawks who have traditionally fielded excellent flag football teams. However, in their first season, they also went winless.

== Outdoor education ==
Situated in Northern Ontario's boreal forest, Confederation offers an outdoor education program.

These courses provide opportunities to develop a personalized approach to healthy active living through participation in classroom activities combined with strenuous outdoor experiences. Students are expected to explore and demonstrate appropriate knowledge, skills, and attitudes in three interconnected themes:

- Outdoor Skills – is essential for enjoying the outdoors safely and comfortably throughout the year.
- Personal Development – teamwork and leadership techniques that emphasize self-awareness, self-respect, and appreciation of others
- Environmental Understanding – awareness and respect for all living things, as well as knowledge of basic ecological processes

Students learn wilderness skills such as first aid, Nordic skiing, snowshoeing, winter camping, wilderness survival, ecology, hiking, orienteering, backpacking, swimming, canoeing, weather interpretation, teamwork, and leadership. Each semester the classes take canoe trips through the Temagami wilderness, hiking trips in Killarney Provincial Park, and a winter camping trip where they sleep in quinzhees they have constructed.

== Music ==
Confederation was the home of the Evolutionary Rock Band. It was started by teacher Norm McIntosh in 1979 (when it was known as the Confed Rock Band) and continued to be run by him for 37 years. McIntosh was the inaugural recipient of the Canadian Music Teacher of the Year Juno award. He was presented $25000 for the band's many costs on behalf of the musicians' band-aid program.

The band consists of four vocalists, an eight-piece rhythm section, four trumpets, four trombones, two alto saxes, four tenor saxes, and a 15-member stage crew. The crew can be farther divided into jobs including sound technicians, guitar effects technicians, light and effects technicians, a fog technician, two spotlight operators, and a crew manager. Evolutionary band and crew member students are between the ages of 14 and 18. The band was featured on Canada AM in April 2007 for its success in breaking the Guinness world record for 'deepest concert below the Earth's surface'. The record was broken at 742 metres (2,434 ft) below sea level at 3400 level of CVRD Inco's Copper Cliff North Mine, Copper Cliff, Ontario.

In 2008, Evolutionary was recognized as Junior Citizens of the Year at the Community Builders Awards of Excellence for the City of Greater Sudbury.

Evolutionary has been visited by such artists as The Tragically Hip, Hedley, Keshia Chanté, Sloan, Suzie McNeil, The Trews, Three Days Grace, Finger Eleven, and record producer Bob Ezrin.

Despite the fact that most of the bands' activities take place outside regular school hours, the students involved in the Evolutionary band receive a full credit towards high school graduation.

Confederation is one of the few schools in Canada with a professional recording studio. This recording studio is used for a full-credit recording course, which is the only one of its type in Ontario at the high school level. Students are taught how to use the recording software, gain experience working on short CDs for local artists, and learn how to make radio commercials.

== Drama and improvisation ==
Confederation has a play production. The production have been there for four years and consist of grades 9-12.

== Administration ==
Confederation is overseen by the Rainbow District School Board. 2025-2026 administration was:

- Principal: Mr. Yves Poirier
- Vice-Principal: Mr. Dane MacVeigh

== See also ==
- Education in Ontario
- List of secondary schools in Ontario
