= 2018 Greater Sudbury municipal election =

Canadian municipal election

- October 22, 2018
- Turnout: ~45%
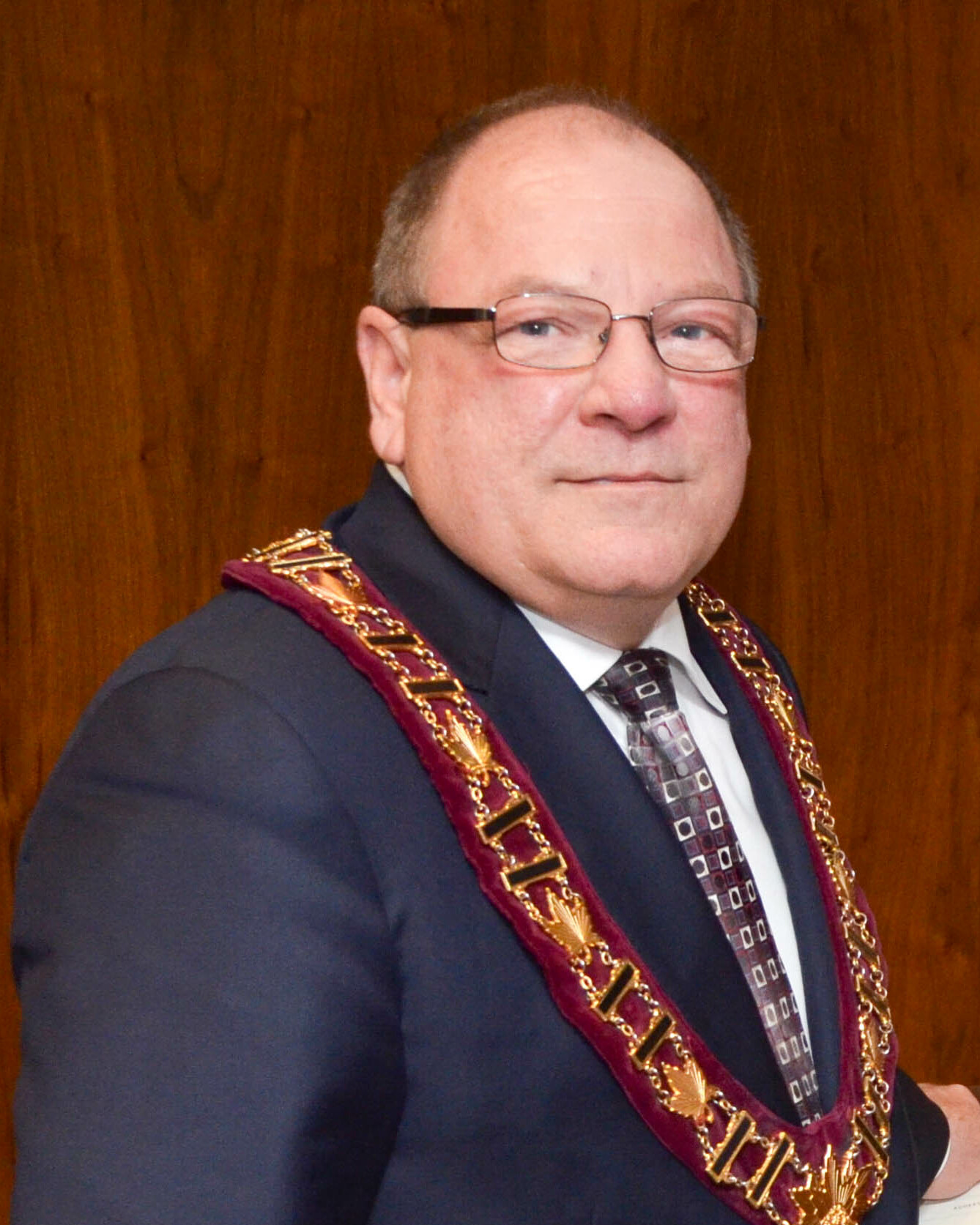
| | | PM | DM |
| Candidate | Brian Bigger | Patricia Mills | Dan Melanson |
| Popular vote | 14,684 | 9,746 | 8,673 |
| Percentage | 28.32% | 18.80% | 16.73% |
| | CC | TC | JH |
| Candidate | Cody Cacciotti | Troy Crowder | Jeff Huska |
| Popular vote | 8,066 | 4,279 | 2,746 |
| Percentage | 15.56% | 8.25% | 5.30% |
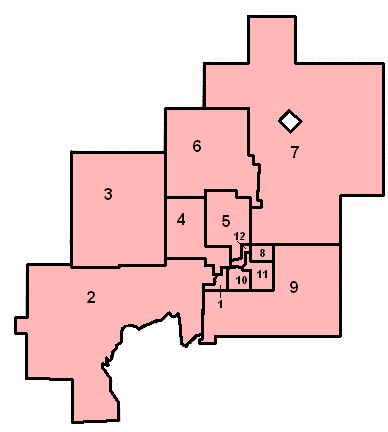
- Ward boundaries of the City of Greater Sudbury
Mayor before election
Brian Bigger
Elected Mayor
Brian Bigger

The 2018 Greater Sudbury municipal election was held on October 22, 2018 to elect a mayor and 12 city councillors in Greater Sudbury, Ontario. In addition, school trustees were elected to the Rainbow District School Board, Sudbury Catholic District School Board, Conseil scolaire de district du Grand Nord de l'Ontario and Conseil scolaire de district catholique du Nouvel-Ontario.

The election was held in conjunction with those held in other municipalities in the province of Ontario. For other elections, see 2018 Ontario municipal elections. For the first time in the city's history, the election was conducted primarily through online voting, with only a small number of physical voting locations available for people who could not or did not want to vote online.

As per the Ontario Municipal Elections Act, 1996, nomination papers for candidates for municipal and school board elections can be filed from May 1, 2018, at which time the campaign period began.

== Issues ==
The dominant issue in the election campaign was the Kingsway Entertainment District, a proposed new arena and hotel complex in the city's east end which will replace the Sudbury Arena as the city's primary sports and entertainment events venue.

In the end, the newly elected council comprises a mix of both supporters and opponents of the Entertainment District.

== Voting delays ==
On election day, Greater Sudbury was one of 51 municipalities across Ontario whose elections were affected by a technical failure at Dominion Voting Systems, the company that operated the online voting architecture. According to Dominion Voting Systems, the company's colocation centre provider imposed an unauthorized bandwidth cap due to the massive increase in voting traffic in the early evening, thus making it impossible for many voters to get through to the server. Under the provisions of the Ontario Municipal Act which permit city clerks to extend voting hours in the event of an emergency, the city announced that voting would be extended to October 23, with no results announced until Tuesday evening.

== Mayor ==
| Mayoral Candidate | Vote | % |
|---|---|---|
| Brian Bigger (X) | 14,684 | 28.32 |
| Patricia Mills | 9,746 | 18.80 |
| Dan Melanson | 8,673 | 16.73 |
| Cody Cacciotti | 8,066 | 15.56 |
| Troy Crowder | 4,279 | 8.25 |
| Jeff Huska | 2,746 | 5.30 |
| Bill Crumplin | 2,158 | 4.16 |
| Bill Sanders | 792 | 1.53 |
| Ron Leclair | 534 | 1.03 |
| Rodney Newton | 102 | 0.20 |
| J. David Popescu | 72 | 0.14 |

== City Council ==
=== Ward 1 ===
| Council Candidate | Vote | % |
|---|---|---|
| Mark Signoretti (X) | 2,291 | 53.30 |
| Bob Johnston | 1,075 | 25.01 |
| Justin Pappano | 719 | 16.73 |
| Gordon Harris | 213 | 4.96 |

=== Ward 2 ===
| Council Candidate | Vote | % |
|---|---|---|
| Michael Vagnini (X) | acclaimed | |

=== Ward 3 ===
| Council Candidate | Vote | % |
|---|---|---|
| Gerry Montpellier (X) | acclaimed | |

=== Ward 4 ===
| Council Candidate | Vote | % |
|---|---|---|
| Geoff McCausland | 1,503 | 38.18 |
| Don Roy | 1,137 | 28.88 |
| Eric Lachance | 812 | 20.62 |
| Jessica Bertrand | 358 | 9.09 |
| Sharon Scott | 127 | 3.23 |

=== Ward 5 ===
| Council Candidate | Vote | % |
|---|---|---|
| Robert Kirwan (X) | 1,807 | 50.19 |
| Michel Lalonde | 1,243 | 34.53 |
| Jerry Desormeaux | 550 | 15.28 |

=== Ward 6 ===
| Council Candidate | Vote | % |
|---|---|---|
| René Lapierre (X) | 1,649 | 36.78 |
| André Rivest | 1,309 | 29.20 |
| Jesse Brooks | 1,104 | 24.63 |
| Chris Bentley | 421 | 9.39 |

=== Ward 7 ===
| Council Candidate | Vote | % |
|---|---|---|
| Mike Jakubo (X) | 2,347 | 51.95 |
| Frank Mazzuca Jr. | 1,205 | 26.67 |
| Deborah Swyer-Burke | 966 | 21.38 |

=== Ward 8 ===
| Council Candidate | Vote | % |
|---|---|---|
| Al Sizer (X) | 1,822 | 45.79 |
| Stefano Presenza | 1,025 | 25.76 |
| Rob Franceschini | 668 | 16.79 |
| Kyle McCall | 464 | 11.66 |

=== Ward 9 ===
| Council Candidate | Vote | % |
|---|---|---|
| Deb McIntosh (X) | 3,170 | 61.85 |
| Paul Stopciati | 1,204 | 23.49 |
| Simon Nickson | 546 | 10.65 |
| Trinity Mary Hollis | 205 | 4.00 |

=== Ward 10 ===
| Council Candidate | Vote | % |
|---|---|---|
| Fern Cormier (X) | 3,611 | 74.42 |
| Steve Ripley | 719 | 14.82 |
| Denis Ferron | 522 | 10.76 |

=== Ward 11 ===
| Council Candidate | Vote | % |
|---|---|---|
| Bill Leduc | 2,317 | 48.60 |
| Terry Kett | 1,031 | 21.63 |
| Elisabeth De Luisa | 523 | 10.97 |
| Derek Young | 363 | 7.61 |
| John Lindsay | 348 | 7.30 |
| Kevin Lalonde | 185 | 3.88 |

=== Ward 12 ===
| Council Candidate | Vote | % |
|---|---|---|
| Joscelyne Landry-Altmann (X) | 2,237 | 62.52 |
| Shawn Ouimet | 584 | 16.32 |
| Tay Butt | 373 | 10.42 |
| Leo Frappier | 204 | 5.70 |
| Mike Petryna | 180 | 5.03 |

Leo Frappier stepped down 2 months prior to the election due to a conflict with the city of Greater Sudbury, however the election officials allowed his name to remain on the electronic ballots.
