= 2026 Greater Sudbury municipal election =

Canadian municipal election

- October 26, 2026
- Turnout: 40.50% (▼1.32 pp)
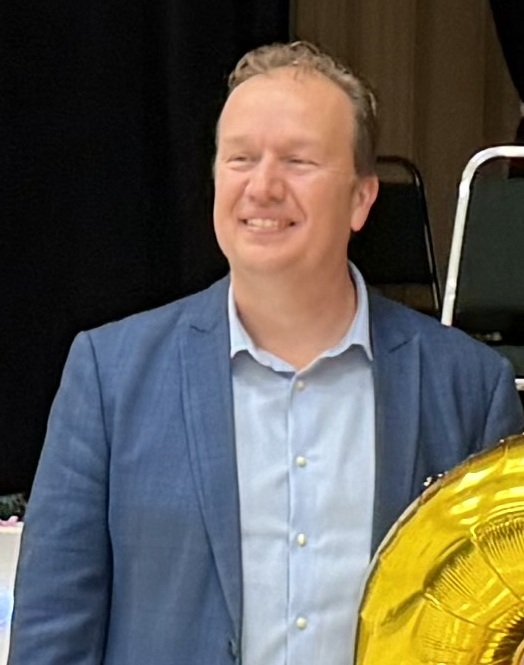
		MRC
Candidate	Paul Lefebvre	Miranda Rocca-Circelli
Popular vote	33,978	14,709
Percentage	62.59%	27.09%
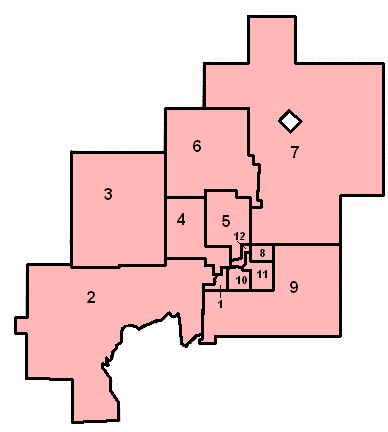
- Ward boundaries of the City of Greater Sudbury
Mayor before election
Paul Lefebvre
Elected Mayor
Paul Lefebvre

The 2026 Greater Sudbury municipal election was held on October 26, 2026, to elect a mayor and 12 city councillors in Greater Sudbury, Ontario. In addition, school trustees were elected to the Rainbow District School Board, Sudbury Catholic District School Board, Conseil scolaire de district du Grand Nord de l'Ontario and Conseil scolaire de district catholique du Nouvel-Ontario.

The election was held in conjunction with those in other municipalities in the province of Ontario. For other elections, see 2026 Ontario municipal elections.

Nominations officially opened on May 1, 2026.

== Mayor ==
Incumbent mayor Paul Lefebvre has announced that he intends to seek re-election. He is being challenged by anti-poverty activist Bob Johnston, businesswoman Miranda Rocca-Circelli, and hockey player Troy Crowder.

Mayoral Candidate	Vote	%
Paul Lefebvre (X)	33,978	62.59
Miranda Rocca-Circelli	14,709	27.09
Bob Johnston	1,890	3.48
Troy Crowder	1,606	2.96
Michael McIntosh	672	1.24
Joseph Boutros	575	1.06
Keenan Menard	503	0.93
Rodney Newton	356	0.66
TOTAL	54,289	

== City Council ==
Four incumbent councillors — Al Sizer in Ward 8, Deb McIntosh in Ward 9, Fern Cormier in Ward 10 and Joscelyne Landry-Altmann in Ward 12 — opted not to run for re-election to new terms. Ward 11 councillor Bill Leduc had also announced plans to run for mayor earlier in the campaign, but ultimately withdrew and instead ran for his council seat again.

=== Ward 1 ===
Council Candidate	Vote	%
Mark Signoretti (X)	2,973	67.80
Tysen Galoni	831	18.95
William Cable	581	13.25
TOTAL	4,385	

=== Ward 2 ===
Council Candidate	Vote	%
Glen Duffy	2,485	49.56
Eric Benoit (X)	1,479	29.50
Dan Xilon	577	11.51
Tracy Oost	247	4.93
Christel Brandle	226	4.51
TOTAL	5,014	

=== Ward 3 ===
Council Candidate	Vote	%
Marcel Montpellier	2,796	69.04
Michel Brabant (X)	964	23.80
Devin White	290	7.16
TOTAL	4,050	

=== Ward 4 ===
Council Candidate	Vote	%
Pauline Fortin (X)	3,232	79.12
Vincent Bolt	853	20.88
TOTAL	4,085	

=== Ward 5 ===
Council Candidate	Vote	%
Mike Parent (X)	2,637	68.80
Roger Trottier	1,196	31.20
TOTAL	3,833	

=== Ward 6 ===
Council Candidate	Vote	%
René Lapierre (X)	2,092	43.80
Keegan Dutrisac	1,842	38.57
Dan Boulard	842	17.63
TOTAL	4,776	

=== Ward 7 ===
Council Candidate	Vote	%
Natalie Labbee (X)	3,116	72.15
Aaron Walsh	913	21.14
Dave Rajotte	290	6.71
TOTAL	4,319	

=== Ward 8 ===
Council Candidate	Vote	%
Natalie Tessier	2,200	51.91
George Lalonde	719	16.97
Shawn Rossi	653	15.41
Karanbir Badhesha	492	11.61
Carla Ross-Arsenault	174	4.11
TOTAL	4,238	

=== Ward 9 ===
Council Candidate	Vote	%
Shawn Michael Poland	2,532	44.60
Carly Gasparini	2,163	38.10
Eddie Astgen	571	10.06
Wanda Berton-Heyerichs	275	4.84
James Borg	136	2.40
TOTAL	5,677	

=== Ward 10 ===
Council Candidate	Vote	%
Cora DeMarco	2,758	53.64
Paul Stopciati	935	18.18
Suzanne Seiling	574	11.16
Derek Young	384	7.47
Tay Butt	359	6.98
Trinity Mary Hollis	104	2.02
Cathan Pasanen	28	0.54
TOTAL	5,142	

=== Ward 11 ===
Council Candidate	Vote	%
Mike Bleskie	2,293	44.21
Daniel Larocque	1,032	19.90
Bill Leduc (X)	501	9.66
Robert Rovinelli	395	7.62
Shawn Ouimet	372	7.17
Amy Voz	351	6.77
Roxanne Tessier	243	4.68
TOTAL	5,187	

=== Ward 12 ===
Council Candidate	Vote	%
Jeff MacIntyre	1,625	49.50
Ron Goswell	777	23.67
Linnet Rimmer	456	13.89
Matteo Raso	305	9.29
Colin McKerral	120	3.66
TOTAL	3,283	

Colin McKerral died on September 28 during the election campaign; however, his name still appeared on the ballot, as his death came after the August 21 withdrawal deadline.

== School Board Elections ==
=== Rainbow District School Board ===
Area 1
Candidate	Vote
Jessica Montgomery	ACCLAIMED

Area 2
Candidate	Vote
Anita Gibson (X)	ACCLAIMED

Area 3
Candidate	Vote	%
Tina Carroll		
Muhammad Afzal		

Area 4
Candidate	Vote
Islam Mohammed	ACCLAIMED

Area 5
Candidate	Vote
David Farrow (X)	ACCLAIMED

Area 6
Candidate	Vote
Judy Hunda (X)	ACCLAIMED

=== Conseil Scolaire Catholique du Nouvel-Ontario ===
Zone 4 has 2 seats, Zone 5 has 3 seats, and Zone 6 has 2 seats,

Zone 4
Candidate	Vote	%
Louise Essiembre		
Sydney Corriveau		
Louise M. Dubé		

Zone 5
Candidate	Vote	%
Josée Bisson (X)		
Raymond Joanisse (X)		
Monique Aubin-Gagné (X)		
Stéphane Clément		

Zone 6
Candidate	Vote
Yanick Proulx	ACCLAIMED
Marcel Legault	ACCLAIMED
