= 2022 Greater Sudbury municipal election =

Canadian municipal election

- October 24, 2022
- Turnout: 41.82% (▼ ~3pp)
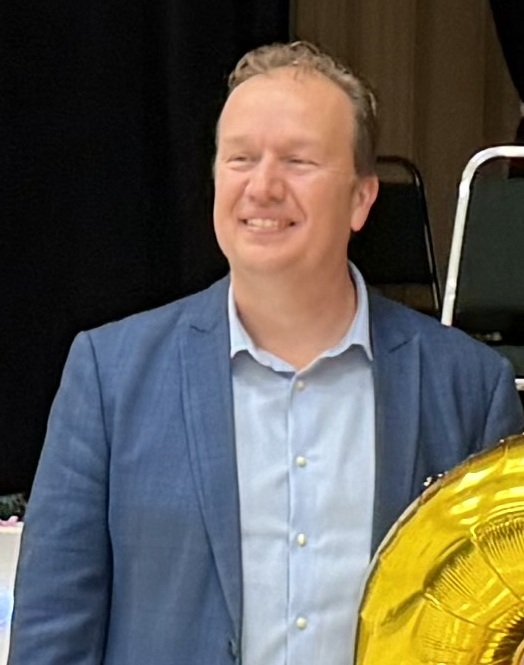
		ED
Candidate	Paul Lefebvre	Evelyn Dutrisac
Popular vote	26,187	9,094
Percentage	52.44%	18.21%
	MRC	MW
Candidate	Miranda Rocca-Circelli	Mila Wong
Popular vote	6,651	3,002
Percentage	13.32%	6.01%
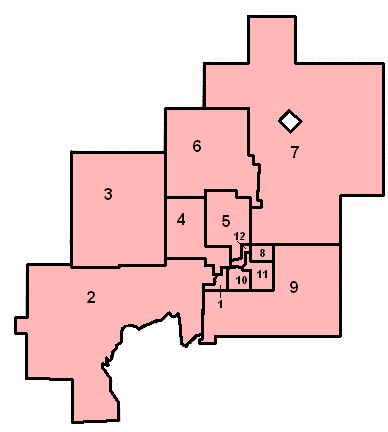
- Ward boundaries of the City of Greater Sudbury
Mayor before election
Brian Bigger
Elected Mayor
Paul Lefebvre

The 2022 Greater Sudbury municipal election was held on October 24, 2022 to elect a mayor and 12 city councillors in Greater Sudbury, Ontario. In addition, school trustees were elected to the Rainbow District School Board, Sudbury Catholic District School Board, Conseil scolaire de district du Grand Nord de l'Ontario and Conseil scolaire de district catholique du Nouvel-Ontario.

The election was held in conjunction with those in other municipalities in the province of Ontario. For other elections, see 2022 Ontario municipal elections.

Nominations officially opened on May 2, 2022.

In March 2022, the city updated its election regulations to provide better clarification of the limits on the use of municipal resources in political campaigns.

== Mayor ==
Incumbent mayor Brian Bigger stated that he intended to run for reelection, and registered as a candidate; however, in early October he dropped out of the race, citing the need to spend more time with his family in light of his mother's declining health. Due to the late timing of his departure, however, his name still appeared on the ballot.

Former federal Member of Parliament Paul Lefebvre, former Ward 4 councillor Evelyn Dutrisac, anti-poverty activist Bob Johnston, Miranda Rocca-Circelli, Don Gravelle, and Devin Labranche have registered to run for election.

Johnston's announcement was greeted with some controversy as he immediately placed a decal with the slogan "Not Bigger, but Better / Mayor / Vote Bob Johnston 2022" on his car within days of his initial announcement, potentially violating provincial election laws stating that candidates cannot incur any election-related expenses prior to the official opening of nominations on May 2.

Rocca-Circelli was accused by some of being a supporter of the "Freedom Convoy", claims which she denies.

Mayoral Candidate	Vote	%
Paul Lefebvre	26,187	52.44
Evelyn Dutrisac	9,094	18.21
Miranda Rocca-Circelli	6,651	13.32
Mila Wong	3,002	6.01
Bob Johnston	1,860	3.72
Devin Labranche	1,367	2.74
Don Gravelle	1,090	2.18
Brian Bigger (X)	607	1.22
J. David Popescu	83	0.17

== City Council ==
=== Ward 1 ===
Council Candidate	Vote	%
Mark Signoretti (X)	2,000	48.58
Mark Facendi	1,733	42.09
Jordan Derro	384	9.33

=== Ward 2 ===
Council Candidate	Vote	%
Michael Vagnini (X)	2,830	60.94
Eric Benoit	1,814	39.06

Vagnini died in office in February 2024. Benoit was appointed to council on March 8, 2024, as his replacement.

=== Ward 3 ===
Council Candidate	Vote	%
Gerry Montpellier (X)	2,373	63.42
Michel Guy Brabant	1,369	36.58

Montpellier died in office on February 21, 2024. Brabant was appointed to council on March 8, 2024, as his replacement.

=== Ward 4 ===
Council Candidate	Vote	%
Pauline Fortin	1,972	49.32
Geoff McCausland (X)	1,866	46.67
Alice Norquay	160	4.00

=== Ward 5 ===
Council Candidate	Vote	%
Michel Parent	3,055	81.08
Robert Kirwan (X)	713	18.92

=== Ward 6 ===
Council Candidate	Vote	%
René Lapierre (X)	1,451	32.90
Michel Lalonde	1,113	25.24
Scott Theodore Seguin	864	19.59
Dan Boulard	501	11.36
Ginette Trottier	481	10.91

=== Ward 7 ===
Council Candidate	Vote	%
Natalie Labbée	2,192	54.50
Mark McKillop	1,281	31.85
Randy Hazlett	357	8.88
Daniel Wiebes	192	4.77

=== Ward 8 ===
Council Candidate	Vote	%
Al Sizer (X)	1,412	39.41
Patrick McCoy	1,060	29.58
Vital Rainville	383	10.69
Bill McElree	338	9.43
Carla Ross-Arsenault	157	4.38
Patrick Auge	119	3.32
Gordon Drysdale	114	3.18

=== Ward 9 ===
Council Candidate	Vote	%
Deb McIntosh (X)	2,930	61.55
Leslie Steel	1,335	28.05
Keith Clarkson	260	5.46
Sharon Jane Scott	235	4.94

=== Ward 10 ===
Council Candidate	Vote	%
Fern Cormier (X)	2,844	59.77
Jolene Felsbourg-Linton	1,098	23.08
Michael Sanders	816	17.15

=== Ward 11 ===
Council Candidate	Vote	%
Bill Leduc (X)	3,002	66.96
Christopher Duncanson-Hales	1,481	33.04

=== Ward 12 ===
Council Candidate	Vote	%
Joscelyne Landry-Altmann (X)	1,609	49.37
Jeff MacIntyre	1,044	32.03
Shawn Ouimet	471	14.45
Luciano Di Mario	135	4.14
