= Burwash, Ontario =

Burwash
- Unincorporated community
- Interactive map of Burwash
- Coordinates: 46°14′22″N 80°51′03″W
- Country: Canada
- Province: Ontario
- District: Sudbury District
- Established: 1914
- Disestablished: 1975
- Time zone: UTC−5 (EST)
  - Summer (DST): UTC−4 (EDT)

Burwash was the name of a community in Ontario, Canada, located approximately 30 miles (48 km) south of Sudbury.

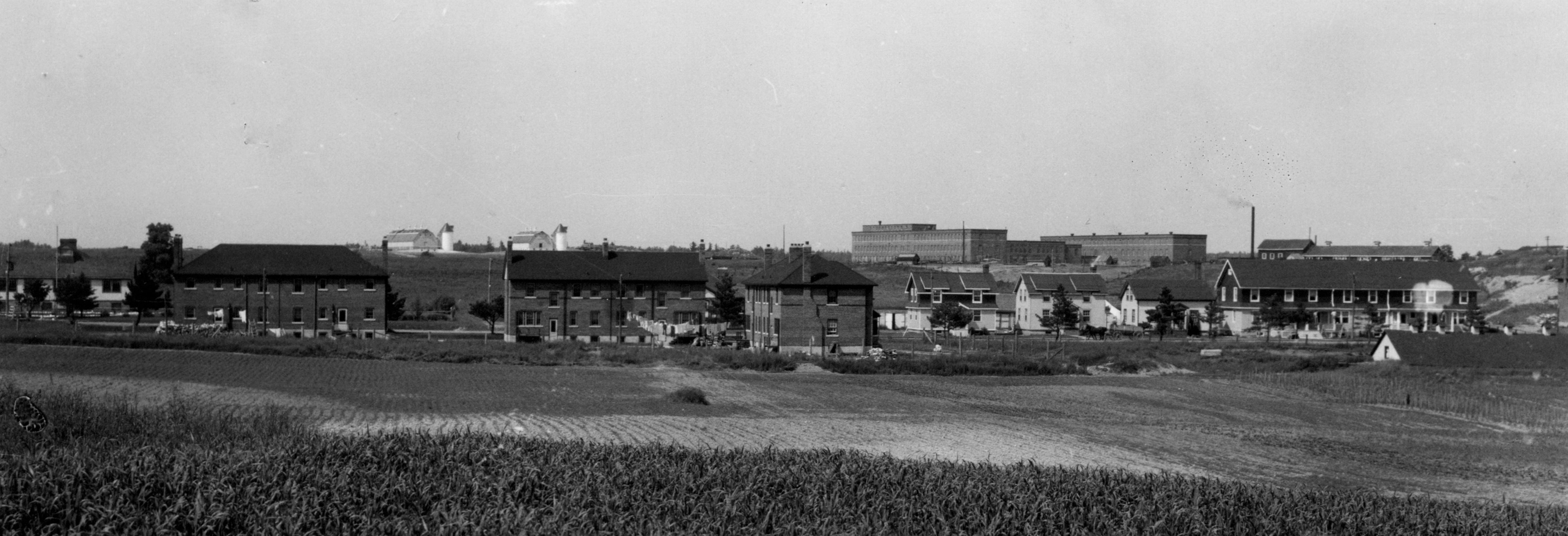
Historical view of Burwash Industrial Farm townsite. Foreground shows staff village homes. Left features two barns and silos from the prison's extensive farm operations. Background right shows the Burwash prison building (Main Camp).

== History ==
The community was built to house the staff working at the Burwash Industrial Farm (also referred to as the Burwash Correctional Centre), a provincial jail that housed anywhere from 180 to 820 inmates during its history. The prison opened in 1914 and shuttered in 1975, after it was deemed to be too costly to run despite it being a self-sufficient institution.

Prior to the construction of Highway 69, Burwash was an isolated location in the Wanapitei River valley, accessible only from a nearby station on the Canadian Northern Railway (today's Canadian National Railway). At its peak, the correctional facility owned 35,000 acres (14,164 ha) and leased an additional 100,000 acres (40,469 ha) of land, and was the fourth-largest employer in the Sudbury area. Following the construction of Highway 69, the facility became less isolated and signs were posted on the highway advising motorists not to pick up hitchhikers in the area due to the possibility of convict escapes.

Because the prison's geographic isolation meant that employees could not simply commute from Sudbury or Killarney on a daily basis, a townsite was required for the guards and support staff that worked at the prison farm and the community, built by inmate labour, housed anywhere up to about 1,000 residents. It boasted a public school, which went from kindergarten through grade 10 at one point, a church, a post office, a barber shop, a tailor shop and a shoe repair shop. There was also a grocery store that sold bread made by the inmates, meat from the farm and vegetables produced by the inmates, as well as other grocery items which were brought in from Sudbury. Milk was delivered to the door by horse and wagon and the garbage was picked up by a different horse and wagon. There was a complete working sawmill, which milled the trees cut down by inmates. The village was built from the lumber and all of the provincial parks were provided with picnic tables made there as well. Burwash was considered to be almost self-sufficient, with the inmates working at various trades and receiving an education.

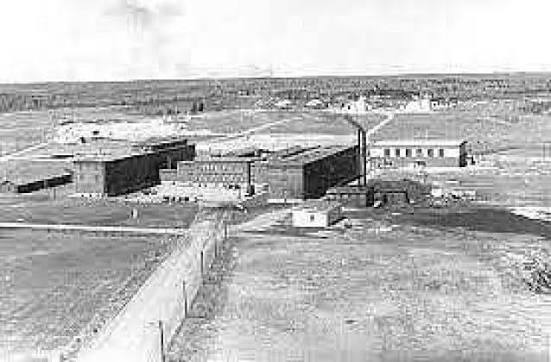
Aerial view of the Burwash prison building (Main Camp). This close-up shows the primary cell blocks and main structure of the industrial farm before its demolition.

One of the few successful escapes from the prison took place on May 17, 1966, when convicted murderer Wayne Ford and two other prisoners escaped into the bush, walking for 16 miles before stealing a car and making it to Toronto. All three were eventually recaptured, and transferred to maximum security institutions.

David Clayton-Thomas, who had been a juvenile offender in his youth before becoming a noted rock singer, also spent some time in the institution.

== Closure ==
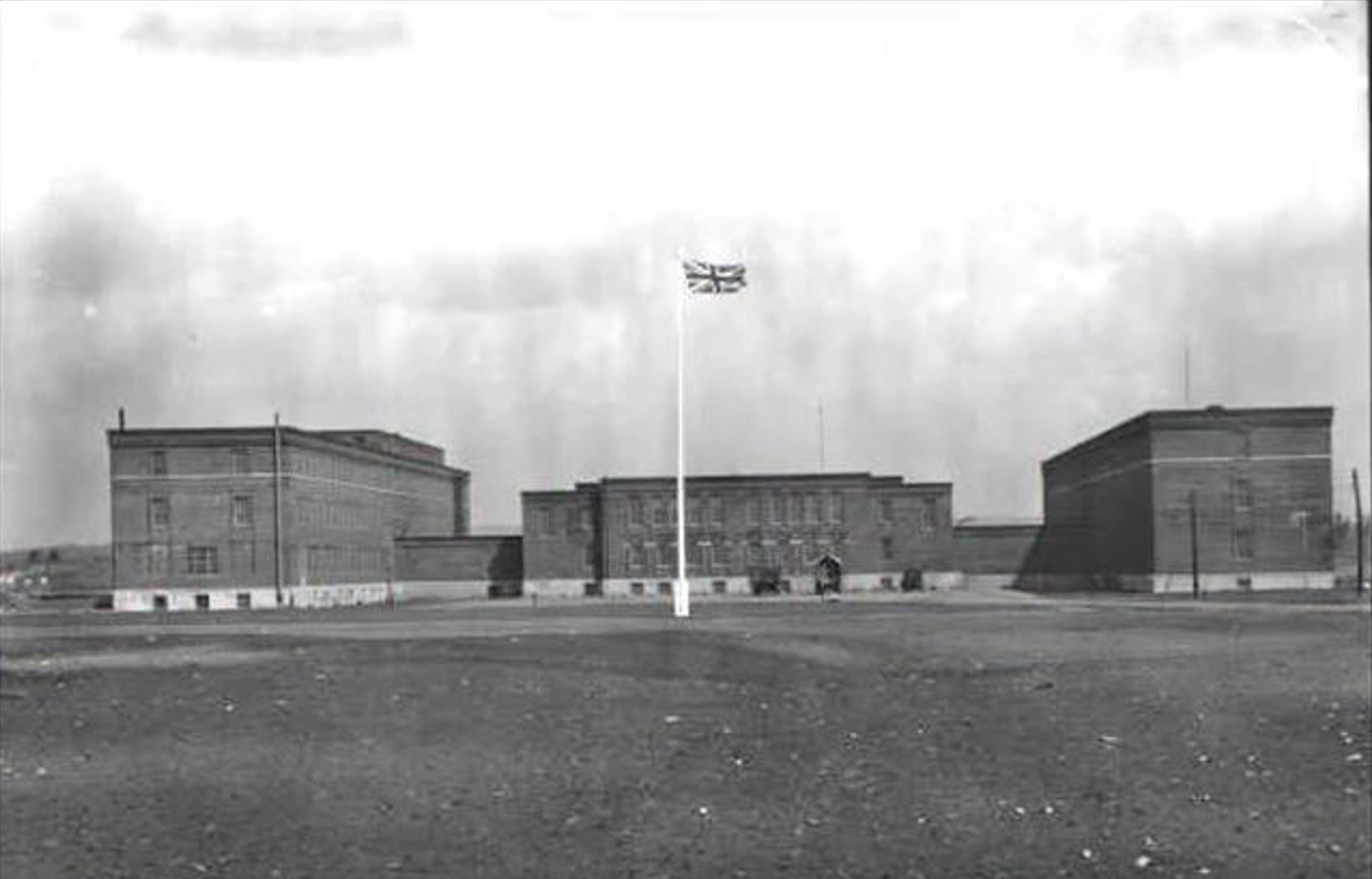
Ground-level view of the main Burwash prison building (Main Camp). This front-facing shot captures the full scale of the primary correctional facility and its central architecture.

After the prison was closed in 1975, the provincial government's initial plan to sell off the site was opposed by MPP Bud Germa. After a journalist from CKNC-TV interviewed Germa about the issue on the Burwash site, Progressive Conservative MPP Margaret Scrivener accused him of illegal trespassing.

In 1977, the federal government of Canada launched a feasibility study on a proposal to take over the facility as a new maximum security prison, but this was dropped in 1978. The provincial government also considered proposals to convert the site into a provincial park or a physical rehabilitation centre to be operated by the provincial Workman's Compensation Board, which were also not pursued. In 1980, a portion of the site was leased to the Regional Municipality of Sudbury as part of a failed attempt to launch an angora goat farm in the area, which became one of the most infamous economic development boondoggles in the city's history.

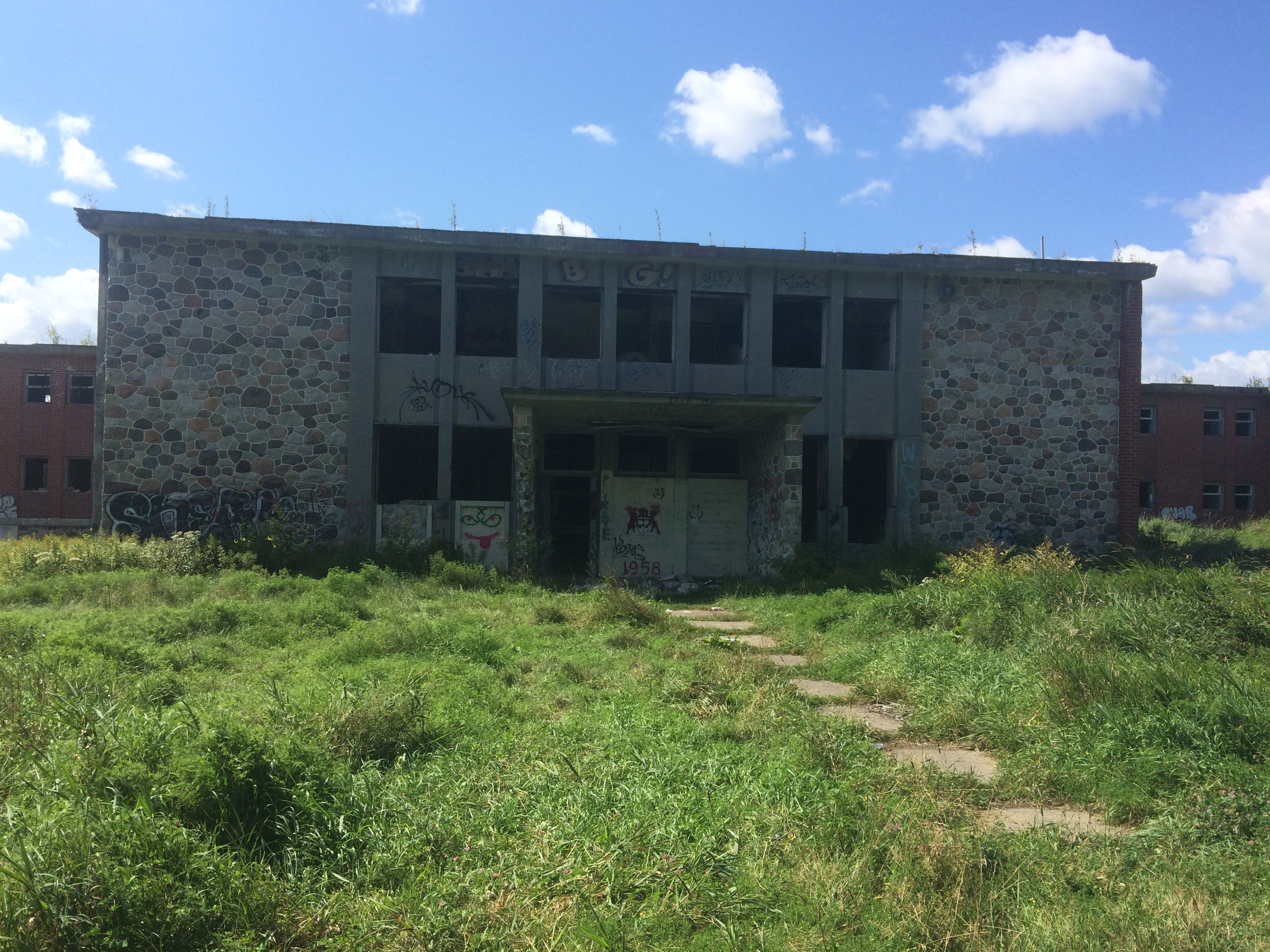
Front view of the Camp Bison prison building at Burwash. This shot shows the main entrance and facade of the 1958 medium-security facility, which remains standing as a ruin today. Taken 2021

In 1986, Cambrian College professor David Blake put forward a proposal to buy the site and open a for-profit institution at which prisoners would be given unionized paid work, which was also not pursued.

In 1987, the land was parcelled off to various groups. The Department of National Defence took over 3,000 hectares for use as a military training area; the Burwash Native Peoples Project took over 3,200 hectares for a First Nations-owned sawmill company; the Sudbury Public School Board leased part of the land for an outdoor science education program; the provincial Ministry of Transportation took over on-site gravel reserves for use in road construction; the Ministry of Natural Resources took over 6,200 hectares for timber and wildlife management; and a local country music festival was granted a parcel of the site to serve as its new venue. A citizen's group in Sudbury, the Sudbury Citizens Movement, opposed the plan and sought to acquire the site so it could establish a worker's cooperative in the institutional buildings and an affordable housing community in the residential townsite, but was not successful in overturning the selloff.

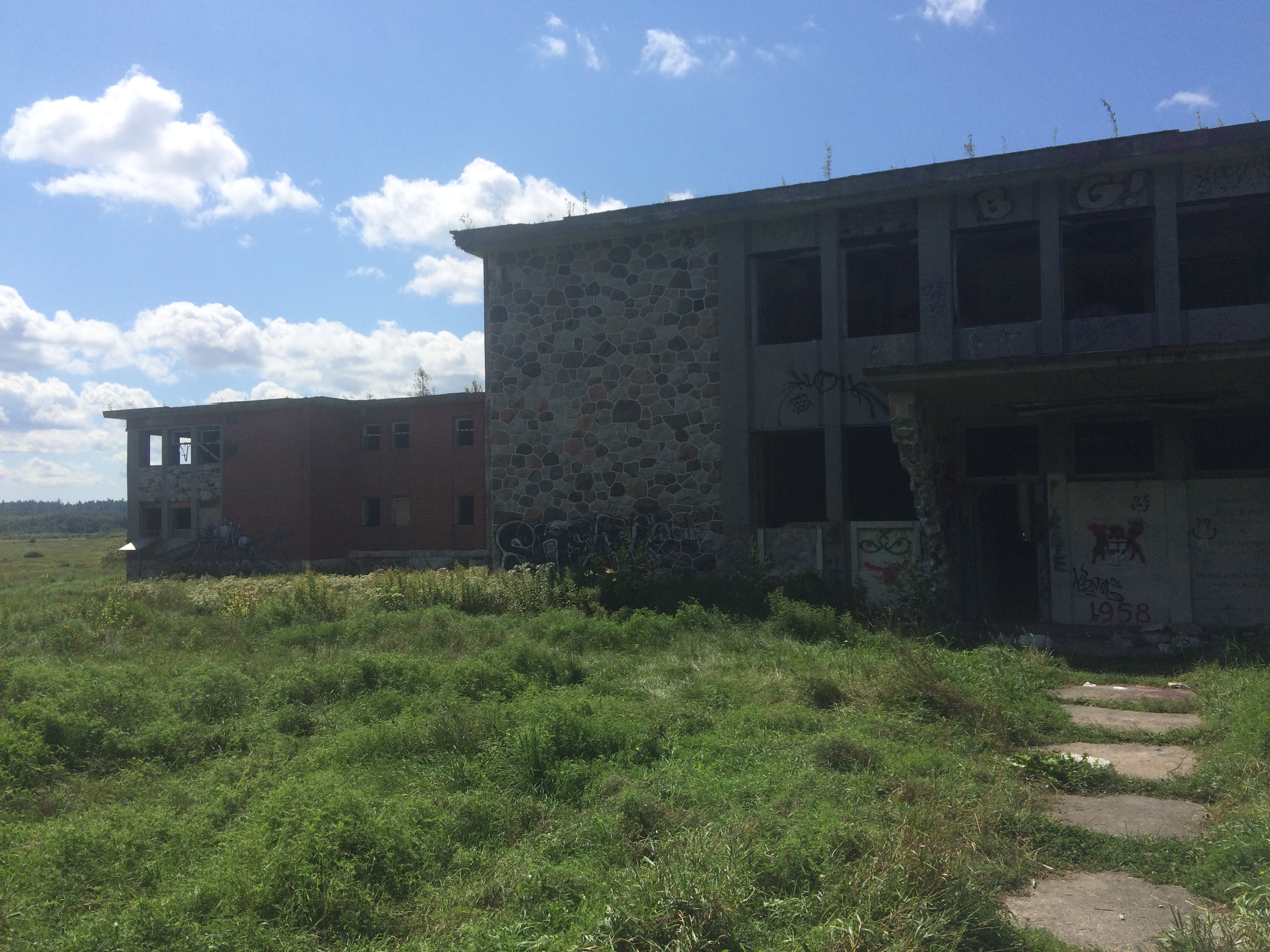
View to the left of the Camp Bison prison building front. This shot captures some of the exterior wing and side structure of the 1958 medium-security facility as it stands today. Taken 2021

While the Burwash Correctional Centre and its surrounding townsite were demolished in 1994, the separate Camp Bison jail facility remains standing in a state of dilapidation as of 2026. In March 2020, Avalon Eco Resort purchased the Camp Bison building and surrounding lands to establish a hiking trail with access off Ontario Highway 637; the site has since become a popular attraction for hikers and explorers.

In the early 2000s, various proposals were put forward to reestablish Burwash as an intentional community, which would be built on principles of environmental sustainability; to date, no such project has been formally launched. Further parcels of land on the site were placed for sale by the provincial government in 2021, with community groups again organizing to oppose the sale.

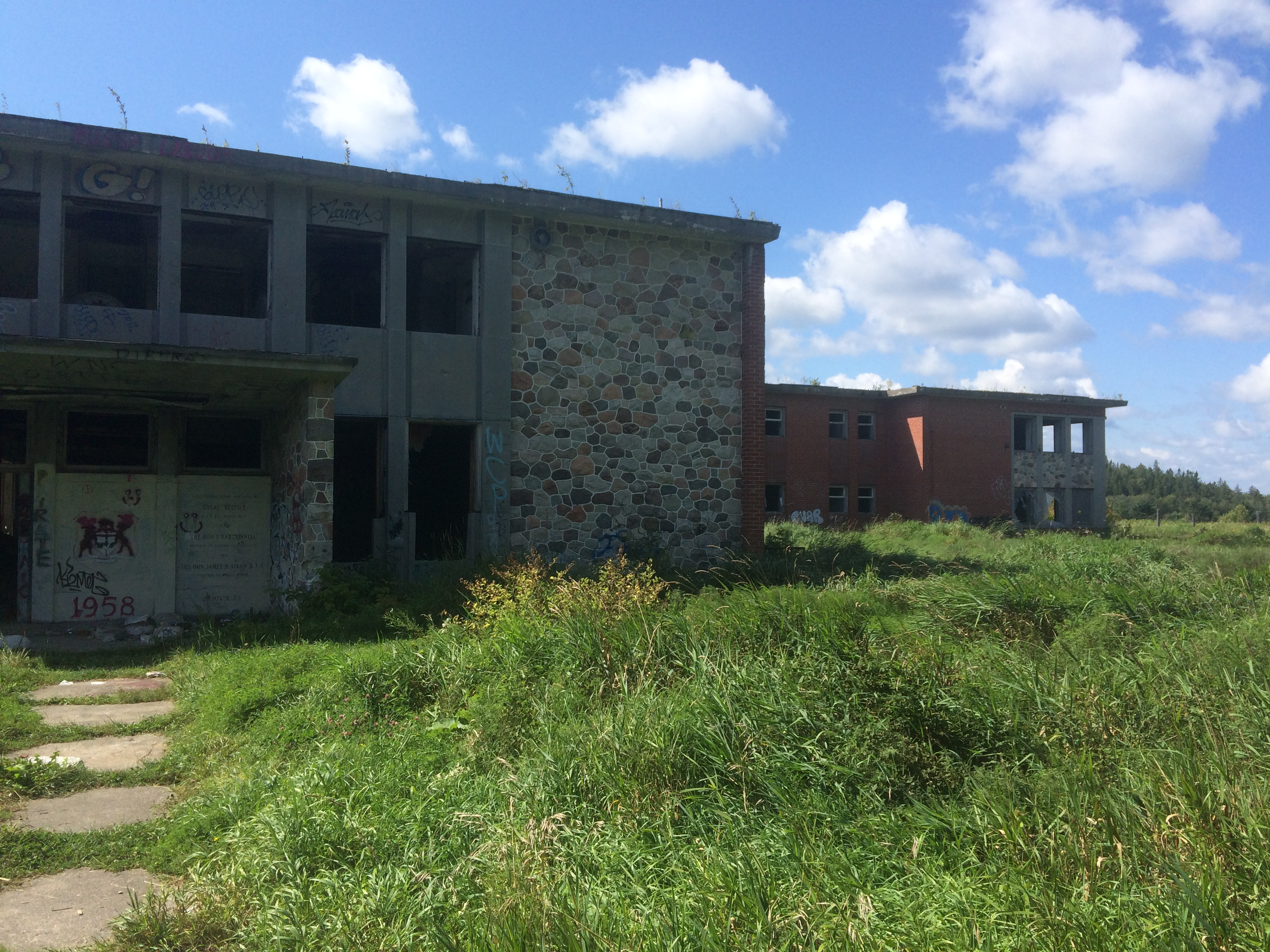
View to the right of the Camp Bison prison building front. This angle shows the right-side layout and peripheral walls of the facility at the Burwash Industrial Farm site. Taken 2021

Several community reunions were held in the 1990s and 2000s. An Ontario Heritage Trust plaque was unveiled at the site on August 6, 2006.

As of 2012, the site is no longer directly accessible from the route of Highway 69. As part of the ongoing freeway conversion of the highway, its route was realigned to the east, and the Burwash road is now accessed from a decommissioned highway segment leading to Ontario Highway 637.

== Elk population ==
The site also hosted an attempt to replenish the decimated elk population of Ontario. Beginning in the 1930s, a herd of elk was transported from Alberta to be raised in the safe confines of the prison farm. Because the proximity of a human community provided the elk with an additional source of food, this population thrived more successfully than a similarly-sized population that was transferred to the Chapleau Crown Game Preserve at the same time.

By 1950, however, concerns that the elk were spreading liver fluke to other local animal populations led the provincial government to institute a program of reducing the population by permitting hunting of the elk. A reevaluation of the problem in 1970 revealed that the parasites had in fact travelled the other way, from the indigenous wildlife to the transplanted elk, and the government reinstituted a ban on hunting the animals in the hopes of allowing the population to rebuild again.

By 1985 the elk population had not significantly recovered, and an additional herd was transported from Alberta to Burwash in 1997. The 1997 transfer had some success in rebuilding the elk population, which was cited as one of the reasons for the construction of a grade-separated wildlife crossing over the realigned route of Highway 69 in the area.

== See also ==
- List of correctional facilities in Ontario
