= Paul Lefebvre (Canadian politician) =

Canadian politician (born 1974)

His Worship Paul Lefebvre
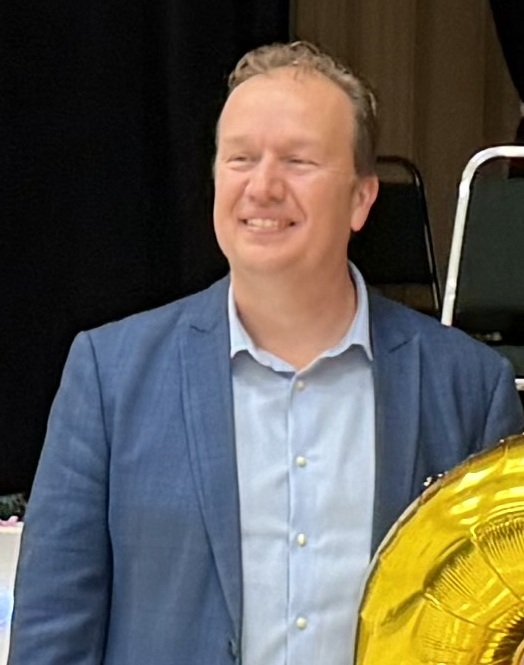
- Lefebvre in 2025

Mayor of Greater Sudbury
- Incumbent
- Assumed office November 15, 2022
- Preceded by: Brian Bigger

Member of Parliament for Sudbury
- In office October 19, 2015 – August 15, 2021
- Preceded by: Glenn Thibeault
- Succeeded by: Viviane Lapointe

Personal details
- Born: September 24, 1974 (age 52) Kapuskasing, Ontario, Canada
- Party: Independent
- Other political affiliations: Liberal
- Spouse: Dr. Lyne Giroux
- Children: 3
- Education: University of Waterloo (MTax); University of Ottawa Faculty of Law (LLB); University of Ottawa (BMus)
- Profession: Politician; attorney
- Website: https://www.paullefebvre.ca/

Paul A. Lefebvre (born 1974) is a Canadian politician currently serving as the mayor of Greater Sudbury. He was a member of Parliament (MP) for the riding of Sudbury from 2015 to 2021.

Lefebvre worked as a lawyer, spending some time as counsel to the Ontario Human Rights Commission, and teaching international tax law at the University of Ottawa. In his business career, he was the owner of local media firm Le5 Communications, whose holdings included French-language radio and newspapers. He won the Liberal Party's nomination contest in Sudbury on March 28, 2015, over former mayor Marianne Matichuk.

Lefebvre served as Parliamentary Secretary to the Minister of Natural Resources from August 31, 2018 until March 18, 2021.

In March 2021, Lefebvre announced that he would not run for a third term in the 2021 Canadian federal election. He won election as mayor of Greater Sudbury in the 2022 Greater Sudbury municipal election on October 24, 2022, and took office on November 15.

== Electoral record ==
=== Municipal ===
2026 Greater Sudbury municipal election
Mayoral Candidate	Vote	%
Paul Lefebvre (X)		
Miranda Rocca-Circelli		
Troy Crowder		
Bob Johnston		
Rodney Newton		
Joseph Boutros		
Michael McIntosh		
Keenan Menard		
Total		

2022 Greater Sudbury municipal election
Mayoral Candidate	Vote	%
Paul Lefebvre	26,187	52.44
Evelyn Dutrisac	9,094	18.21
Miranda Rocca-Circelli	6,651	13.32
Mila Wong	3,002	6.01
Bob Johnston	1,860	3.72
Devin Labranche	1,367	2.74
Don Gravelle	1,090	2.18
Brian Bigger (X)	607	1.22
J. David Popescu	83	0.17
Total	50,741	100.00

=== Federal ===
2019 Canadian federal election: Sudbury
Party	Candidate	Votes	%	±%	Expenditures
Liberal	Paul Lefebvre	19,643	40.94	-6.48	$66,620.57
New Democratic	Beth Mairs	13,885	28.94	+1.15	$25,924.07
Conservative	Pierre St-Amant	9,864	20.56	-0.54	$20,356.06
Green	Bill Crumplin	3,225	6.72	+3.68	$13,223.85
People's	Sean Paterson	873	1.82	–	none listed
Animal Protection	Chanel Lalonde	282	0.59	–	none listed
Independent	Charlene Sylvestre	135	0.28	–	none listed
Independent	J. David Popescu	70	0.15	-0.02	none listed
Total valid votes/expense limit		47,977	99.24		
Total rejected ballots		317	0.66	+0.24	
Turnout		48,294	65.36	-3.86	
Eligible voters		75,035			
Liberal hold		Swing		-3.81	
Source: Elections Canada

2015 Canadian federal election: Sudbury
Party	Candidate	Votes	%	±%	Expenditures
Liberal	Paul Lefebvre	23,534	47.41	+29.43	$112,165.16
New Democratic	Paul Loewenberg	13,793	27.79	-22.13	$95,385.84
Conservative	Fred Slade	10,473	21.10	-7.25	$192,788.16
Green	David Robinson	1,509	3.04	+0.05	$4,970.15
Independent	Jean-Raymond Audet	134	0.27	–	–
Communist	Elizabeth Rowley	102	0.20	–	–
Independent	J. David Popescu	84	0.17	-0.09	–
Total valid votes/Expense limit		49,629	100.0		$204,934.28
Total rejected ballots		209	–	–	
Turnout		49,838	69.61	–	
Eligible voters		71,594			
Liberal gain from New Democratic		Swing		+34.77	
Source: Elections Canada
