= Doug Frith =

Canadian politician (1945–2009)

The Honourable Doug Frith PC

MP for Sudbury
- In office April 14, 1980 – October 1, 1988
- Preceded by: James Jerome
- Succeeded by: Diane Marleau

Personal details
- Born: Douglas Cockburn Frith; March 5, 1945 Brampton, Ontario, Canada
- Died: March 21, 2009 (aged 64) Ottawa, Ontario, Canada
- Party: Liberal
- Occupation: Pharmacist

Douglas Cockburn Frith, PC (March 5, 1945 – March 21, 2009) was a Canadian politician. He represented the riding of Sudbury in the House of Commons of Canada from 1980 to 1988 as a member of the Liberal Party. From July 1996 to January 2008, Frith served as president of the Canadian Motion Picture Distributors Association, which is affiliated with the Motion Picture Association of America. He was honoured for his public service with the Queen's Jubilee Medals in 1977, 1992 and 2002 and was the recipient of the Public Service Award in 1988 for his work in the area of pension reform.

== Early life ==
Frith was born in Brampton, Ontario, graduated from Sudbury High School and attended the University of Toronto. Before entering politics, he was a pharmacist in Sudbury. He was first elected as an alderman for Sudbury City Council in 1971 at the age of 26, and later served as chairman of the Regional Municipality of Sudbury between 1977 and 1980. As chair of the Regional Municipality of Sudbury, he established a new relationship between municipal government and Inco, and was instrumental in the launch of Science North.

== Political career ==
He served as parliamentary secretary to the Minister of Health from 1980 to 1982, in the final government of Prime Minister Pierre Trudeau. Between 1980 and 1984, Frith chaired the Special Committee on Pension Reform. When John Turner succeeded Trudeau as Liberal leader and Prime Minister in 1984, he brought Frith into cabinet as Minister of Indian Affairs and Northern Development. The Liberals lost the 1984 election, however, and Frith was one of just 40 Liberal MPs to be re-elected. Frith served as chairman of the National Liberal Caucus between 1984 and 1987. Between 1984 and 1988, Frith held the portfolio of Opposition Critic for National Defence and National Health and Welfare.

== After politics ==
He did not run in the 1988 election in order to accept an appointment with Hill & Knowlton as senior vice-president. He became chairman of the Canadian subsidiary in 1995. From July 1996 to January 2008, Frith served as president of the Canadian Motion Picture Distributors Association, which is affiliated with the Motion Picture Association of America, and represents the interests of the American film industry in Canada. In April 2008, he joined Global Public Affairs as vice-chair. Frith served as chair of the Education Foundation of the Canadian Association of Former Parliamentarians (CAFP) and as the chair of the CAFP. Frith was a member on numerous Boards, including the Toronto East General Hospital, the Canadian Council on Aboriginal Business and the Canadian Film Centre.

Frith died following a massive heart attack in Ottawa on March 21, 2009.
