= École secondaire du Sacré-Cœur =

Catholic secondary school in Sudbury, Ontario, Canada

Coordinates: 46.50016°N 80.98888°W

Location
- 261 Notre-Dame Avenue; Greater Sudbury, Ontario; Canada

Information
- Religious affiliation: Catholicism
- Established: 2003; 23 years ago
- Language: French
- Website: essacrecoeur.nouvelon.ca

École secondaire du Sacré-Cœur is one of four French-language Catholic secondary schools in Greater Sudbury, Ontario. It is maintained by the Conseil scolaire de district catholique du Nouvel-Ontario. It is located at 261 Notre-Dame Avenue, next to city-owned soccer fields and tennis courts which double as school grounds. The school is currently under the direction of Paul Henry and acting as the vice-principal is Suzanne Lapointe.

The student population is estimated to be over 400, and so exceeding its originally intended student capacity. The large number of students resulted in the temporary installation of 3 small portable classrooms behind the atrium. The portables are to remain until the completion of an expansion on the school, known as Plan B.

The grounds are also the location of Sudbury's first Franco-Ontarian monument, which encompasses the monument placed there nearly 100 years ago. The unveiling took place on September 25, 2008.

== History ==
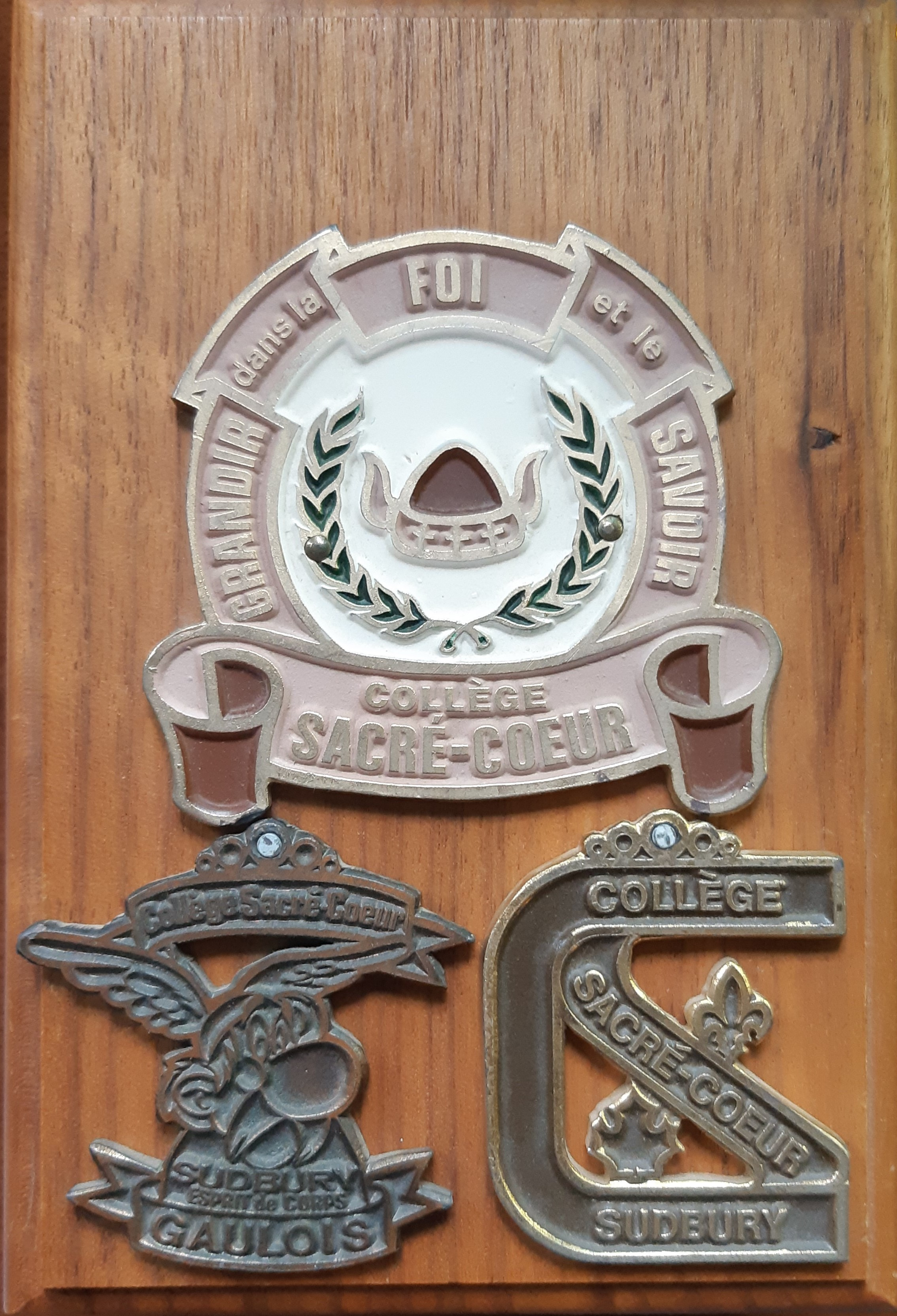
1981 College Sacre Coeur

=== Predecessors ===
Father Joseph Specht and Father Jean-Baptiste Nolin were Jesuit priests behind the conception of the then Collège du Sacré-Cœur de Sudbury. It was the first, and for a long time only, classical college in the Northern Ontario area. It first opened its doors in 1913 and was a school exclusively for the education of boys. In 1957, the college was renamed and became the University of Sudbury. Starting in 1967, the building served as one of Cambrian College's three campuses until 1977. It reopened as a high school for boys from 1978.

It was later occupied by the Gymzone Family Fitness Centre, which has relocated to the old École Leon XIII school. Collège Boréal also employed the space from 1995 to 1997 while their new facilities were being constructed.

=== Current School ===
Following some renovations, École secondaire du Sacré-Cœur opened in 2003. Part of the original building's foundation is still intact and clearly visible in the school's entrance. During its first year, Sacré-Cœur's student population was mainly composed of the students from the former École secondaire catholique l'Héritage, a school that had to be shut down. The last students from l'Héritage graduated in 2007.

== Student life ==
École secondaire du Sacré-Cœur, much like its counterpart Collège Notre-Dame, the other French Catholic high school in Sudbury, has a uniform code. Students have the choice of pants (dress or casual), capris, shorts, or kilts for girls with which they can wear various tops, ranging from rugby shirts, blouses, golf shirts, and sweatshirts among others. The golf shirts come in white, royal blue and powder blue.

== See also ==
- Education in Ontario
- List of secondary schools in Ontario
