= Rodger Mitchell =

Canadian politician (1898–1967)

- Official 1966 portrait

MP for Sudbury
- In office 1953–1967
- Preceded by: Léo Gauthier
- Succeeded by: Bud Germa

Personal details
- Born: David Rodger Mitchell; March 26, 1898 Owen Sound, Ontario
- Died: January 4, 1967 (aged 68) Sudbury, Ontario
- Party: Liberal
- Occupation: pharmacist

David Rodger Mitchell (March 26, 1898 – January 4, 1967) was a Canadian politician, who represented the riding of Sudbury in the House of Commons of Canada from 1953 until his death in 1967. He was a member of the Liberal Party.

Mitchell was born in Owen Sound, Ontario. Before entering politics, he was a pharmacist in Sudbury, and served a stint as president of the Northern Ontario Hockey Association.

The by-election following Mitchell's death of pulmonary fibrosis was held on May 29. Jim Jerome ran as the new Liberal candidate, but lost to New Democrat Bud Germa. However, Germa served the riding for just barely more than a year—in the national election the following year, Jerome defeated Germa.
