= Westmount Public School =

Westmount Public School may refer to:

- Westmount Public School (Sudbury, ON)
- Westmount Public School (Peterborough, ON)
- Westmount Public School (London, ON)
