= Sudbury (federal electoral district) =

Federal electoral district in Ontario, Canada

Coordinates: 46.576°N 80.911°W

Ontario electoral district
- Interactive map of riding boundaries from the 2025 federal election

Federal electoral district
- Legislature: House of Commons
MP
Viviane Lapointe
Liberal
- District created: 1947
- First contested: 1949
- Last contested: 2021
- District webpage: profile, map

Demographics
- Population (2021): 95,537
- Electors (2021): 75,123
- Area (km²): 843.58
- Pop. density (per km²): 113.3
- Census division: Greater Sudbury
- Census subdivision: Greater Sudbury (part)

Sudbury is a federal electoral district in Ontario, Canada, which has been represented in the House of Commons since 1949. The district is one of two serving the city of Greater Sudbury, Ontario.

Its member of Parliament (MP) has been Viviane Lapointe of the Liberal Party since 2021.

== Geography ==
Sudbury electoral district consists of the part of the City of Greater Sudbury bounded on the west and south by the Greater Sudbury city limits, and on the north and east by a line drawn from the western city limit of Greater Sudbury east along the northern limit of the former Town of Walden.

== History ==
Sudbury electoral district was created in 1947 from part of the Nipissing riding. It consisted initially of the city of Sudbury and a part of the territorial district of Sudbury.

In 1952, the boundaries were narrowed significantly to include only the city of Sudbury, the geographic township of McKim and the town of Copper Cliff. The rest of the original Sudbury riding was incorporated into the new riding of Nickel Belt.

In 1976, Sudbury's growth in population led the riding to shrink further. It now included only the northern half of the city; the city's southern half was incorporated into Nickel Belt.

In 1996, it was redefined as the part of the City of Sudbury north of a line drawn from east to west along Highway 69, south along Long Lake Road, and west along the north boundary of the geographic Township of Broder.

In 2003, the riding expanded geographically to include the former town of Walden, now part of the city of Greater Sudbury. The remainder of the city continues to be part of the Nickel Belt riding.

This riding was left unchanged after the 2012 electoral redistribution.

Following the 2022 Canadian federal electoral redistribution, the riding will gain Nickel Centre, Wanup and the remainder of the former city of Sudbury from Nickel Belt, and will loses all of its territory west of Highway 144 to the new riding of Sudbury East—Manitoulin—Nickel Belt. These changes will come into effect upon the calling of the 2025 Canadian federal election.

== Demographics ==
According to the 2021 Canadian census

Ethnic groups: 77.9% White, 12.3% Indigenous, 3.8% Black, 2.8% South Asian

Languages: 70.0% English, 16.6% French, 1.7% Italian

Religions: 60.0% Christian (41.1% Catholic, 3.9% United Church, 2.9% Anglican, 1.4% Lutheran, 1.2% Pentecostal, 1.1% Baptist, 8.4% Other), 1.4% Muslim, 1.2% Hindu, 35.3% None

Median income: $42,400 (2020)

Average income: $53,450 (2020)

== Riding associations ==
Riding associations are the local branches of political parties:

Party	Association name	President	HQ city
Conservative	Sudbury Conservative Association	Daran Moxam	Greater Sudbury
Liberal	Sudbury Federal Liberal Association	Janet Gasparini	Greater Sudbury
New Democratic	Sudbury Federal NDP Riding Association	Darius Garneau	Greater Sudbury
People's	Sudbury-Nickel Belt-Muskoka PPC Association	Stewart A. Sinclair	West Nipissing

== Members of Parliament ==
This riding has elected the following members of Parliament:

Parliament	Years	Member	Party
Sudbury; Riding created from Nipissing
21st	1949–1953	Léo Gauthier	Liberal
22nd	1953–1957	Rodger Mitchell	Liberal
23rd	1957–1958	Rodger Mitchell	Liberal
24th	1958–1962	Rodger Mitchell	Liberal
25th	1962–1963	Rodger Mitchell	Liberal
26th	1963–1965	Rodger Mitchell	Liberal
27th	1965–1967	Rodger Mitchell	Liberal
27th	1967–1968	Bud Germa	New Democratic
28th	1968–1972	James Jerome	Liberal
29th	1972–1974	James Jerome	Liberal
30th	1974–1979	James Jerome	Liberal
31st	1979–1980	James Jerome	Liberal
32nd	1980–1984	Doug Frith	Liberal
33rd	1984–1988	Doug Frith	Liberal
34th	1988–1993	Diane Marleau	Liberal
35th	1993–1997	Diane Marleau	Liberal
36th	1997–2000	Diane Marleau	Liberal
37th	2000–2004	Diane Marleau	Liberal
38th	2004–2006	Diane Marleau	Liberal
39th	2006–2008	Diane Marleau	Liberal
40th	2008–2011	Glenn Thibeault	New Democratic
41st	2011–2015	Glenn Thibeault	New Democratic
41st	2015–2015	Vacant	
42nd	2015–2019	Paul Lefebvre	Liberal
43rd	2019–2021	Paul Lefebvre	Liberal
44th	2021–2025	Viviane Lapointe	Liberal
45th	2025–present	Viviane Lapointe	Liberal

== Election results ==
Graph of election results in Sudbury (minor parties that never got 2% of the vote or didn't run consistently are omitted) View source data.

2025 Canadian federal election
** Preliminary results — Not yet official **
Party	Candidate	Votes	%	±%	Expenditures
Liberal	Viviane Lapointe	31,329	51.79	+16.81	
Conservative	Ian Symington	23,748	39.25	+11.43	
New Democratic	Nadia Verrelli	4,650	7.69	–21.21	
People's	Nicholas Bonderoff	770	1.27	–4.85	
Total valid votes/expense limit					
Total rejected ballots					
Turnout		60,497	68.17		
Eligible voters		88,742			
Liberal notional hold		Swing		+2.69	
Source: Elections Canada

2021 federal election redistributed results
Party	Vote	%
Liberal	19,385	34.98
New Democratic	16,015	28.90
Conservative	15,414	27.82
People's	3,389	6.12
Green	1,099	1.98
Others	109	0.20

2021 Canadian federal election
Party	Candidate	Votes	%	±%	Expenditures
Liberal	Viviane Lapointe	15,871	34.5	-6.4	$81,822.79
New Democratic	Nadia Verrelli	13,569	29.5	+0.6	$82,941.50
Conservative	Ian Symington	12,747	27.7	+7.1	$89,028.04
People's	Colette Andréa Methé	2,735	5.9	+4.1	$3,349.70
Green	David Robert Robinson	940	2.0	-4.7	$0.00
Independent	J. David Popescu	111	0.2	+0.05	$180.22
Total valid votes		45,973			
Total rejected ballots		313			
Turnout		46,286	62.18		
Eligible voters		74,386			
Source: Elections Canada

2019 Canadian federal election
Party	Candidate	Votes	%	±%	Expenditures
Liberal	Paul Lefebvre	19,643	40.94	-6.48	$66,620.57
New Democratic	Beth Mairs	13,885	28.94	+1.15	$25,924.07
Conservative	Pierre St-Amant	9,864	20.56	-0.54	$20,356.06
Green	Bill Crumplin	3,225	6.72	+3.68	$13,223.85
People's	Sean Paterson	873	1.82	–	none listed
Animal Protection	Chanel Lalonde	282	0.59	–	none listed
Independent	Charlene Sylvestre	135	0.28	–	none listed
Independent	J. David Popescu	70	0.15	-0.02	none listed
Total valid votes/expense limit		47,977	99.24		
Total rejected ballots		317	0.66	+0.24	
Turnout		48,294	65.36	-3.86	
Eligible voters		75,035			
Liberal hold		Swing		-3.81	
Source: Elections Canada

2015 Canadian federal election
Party	Candidate	Votes	%	±%	Expenditures
Liberal	Paul Lefebvre	23,534	47.42	+29.43	$112,165.16
New Democratic	Paul Loewenberg	13,793	27.79	-22.13	$95,385.84
Conservative	Fred Slade	10,473	21.10	-7.25	$192,788.16
Green	David Robinson	1,509	3.04	+0.05	$4,970.15
Independent	Jean-Raymond Audet	134	0.27	–	–
Communist	Elizabeth Rowley	102	0.21	–	–
Independent	J. David Popescu	84	0.17	-0.09	–
Total valid votes/Expense limit		49,629	99.58		$204,934.28
Total rejected ballots		209	0.42	–	
Turnout		49,838	69.22	–	
Eligible voters		73,050			
Liberal gain from New Democratic		Swing		+34.77	
Source: Elections Canada

2011 Canadian federal election
Party	Candidate	Votes	%	±%	Expenditures
New Democratic	Glenn Thibeault	22,684	49.92	+14.77	–
Conservative	Fred Slade	12,881	28.35	+2.56	–
Liberal	Carol Hartman	8,172	17.98	-12.22	–
Green	Frederick Twilley	1,359	2.99	-4.76	–
First Peoples National	Will Morin	229	0.50	-0.42	–
Independent	David Popescu	116	0.26	+0.07	–
Total valid votes/expense limit		45,441	100.00		
Total rejected ballots		180	0.39	-0.05	
Turnout		45,621	63.89	+5.38	
Eligible voters		71,409	–	–	

2008 Canadian federal election
Party	Candidate	Votes	%	±%	Expenditures
New Democratic	Glenn Thibeault	15,094	35.15	+3.20	$71,329
Liberal	Diane Marleau	12,969	30.20	−11.37	$50,177
Conservative	Gerry Labelle	11,073	25.79	+4.11	$85,730
Green	Gordon Harris	3,330	7.75	+5.02	$8,704
First Peoples National	Will Morin	397	0.92		$0
Independent	David Popescu	80	0.19	+0.08	$148
Total valid votes/expense limit		42,943	100.00	$82,461	
Total rejected ballots		192	0.45	−0.03	
Turnout		43,135	58.51	−7.48	
Electors on the lists		73,724			
Note: italicized expenditure totals refer to data that has not yet been finalized by Elections Canada.

2006 Canadian federal election
Party	Candidate	Votes	%	±%	Expenditures
Liberal	Diane Marleau	19,809	41.57	−2.62	$78,232
New Democratic	Gerry McIntaggart	15,225	31.95	+2.09	$38,386
Conservative	Kevin Serviss	10,332	21.68	+0.63	$73,294
Green	Joey Methé	1,301	2.73	−1.94	$420
Progressive Canadian	Stephen L. Butcher	782	1.64	–	$365
Marxist–Leninist	Dave Starbuck	77	0.16	−0.07	
Communist	Sam Hammond	70	0.15		$280
Independent	David Popescu	54	0.11	–	$365
Total valid votes		47,650	100.00		
Total rejected ballots		228	0.48	−0.07	
Turnout		47,878	65.99	+5.91	
Electors on the lists		72,552			
Sources: Official Results, Elections Canada and Financial Returns, Elections Canada.

2004 Canadian federal election
Party	Candidate	Votes	%	±%	Expenditures
Liberal	Diane Marleau	18,914	44.19	−12.80	$56,246
New Democratic	Gerry McIntaggart	12,781	29.86	+16.42	$19,265
Conservative	Stephen L. Butcher	9,008	21.05	−6.44	$60,810
Green	Luke Norton	1,999	4.67		$1,348
Marxist–Leninist	Dave Starbuck	100	0.23		$660
Total valid votes		42,802	100.00		
Total rejected ballots		235	0.55	−0.06	
Turnout		43,037	60.08	+5.77	
Electors on the lists		71,627			
Percentage change figures are factored for redistribution. Conservative Party percentages are contrasted with the combined Canadian Alliance and Progressive Conservative percentages from 2000.
Sources: Official Results, Elections Canada and Financial Returns, Elections Canada.

2000 Canadian federal election
Party	Candidate	Votes	%	±%	Expenditures
Liberal	Diane Marleau	20,290	58.52	+3.10	$49,746
Alliance	Mike Smith	6,554	18.90	+5.94	$24,801
New Democratic	Paul Chislett	4,368	12.60	−8.52	$10,732
Progressive Conservative	Alex McGregor	2,642	7.62	−1.01	$3,827
Green	Thomas Gerry	503	1.45		$327
Canadian Action	Kathy Wells-McNeil	215	0.62	−0.63	$2,006
Communist	Daryl Janet Shandro	98	0.28		$591
Total valid votes		34,670	100.00		
Total rejected ballots		210	0.60	−0.41	
Turnout		34,880	54.31	−8.20	
Electors on the lists		64,220			
Sources: Official Results, Elections Canada and Financial Returns, Elections Canada.

1997 Canadian federal election
Party	Candidate	Votes	%	±%	Expenditures
Liberal	Diane Marleau	22,223	55.42	−9.56	$38,251
New Democratic	John Filo	8,471	21.12	−0.93	$43,509
Reform	Jim Rollo	5,198	12.96	+11.66	$10,657
Progressive Conservative	Bill Lee	3,459	8.63	+0.28	$6,493
Canadian Action	Kathy McNeil	502	1.25		$1,258
Natural Law	Roy Hankonen	247	0.62		$0.00
Total valid votes		40,100	100.00		
Total rejected ballots		412	1.02	+0.72	
Turnout		40,512	62.51	−2.82	
Electors on the lists		64,806			
Percentage change figures are factored for redistribution.
Sources: Official Results, Elections Canada and Financial Returns, Elections Canada.

1993 Canadian federal election
Party	Candidate	Votes	%	±%	Expenditures
Liberal	Diane Marleau	27,951	66.08	+24.05	$37,453
Reform	Mike Smith	5,788	13.68		$8,233
Progressive Conservative	Maurice Lamoureux	3,679	8.70	−13.29	$35,719
New Democratic Party	Rosemarie Blenkinsop	3,675	8.69	−19.08	$36,968
National	Paul Chislett	512	1.21		$1,555
Non-affiliated (CoR)	Billie Christiansen	276	0.65	−7.32	$2,852
Natural Law	David Shaw	202	0.48		$141
Independent	Ed Pokonzie	129	0.30		$230
Abolitionist	Richard Lionel Gouin	86	0.20		$0
Total valid votes		42,298	100.00		
Total rejected ballots		379	0.89	+0.34	
Turnout		42,677	65.41	−8.15	
Electors on the lists		65,243			
Source: Thirty-fifth General Election, 1993: Official Voting Results, Published by the Chief Electoral Officer of Canada. Financial figures taken from official contributions and expenses provided by Elections Canada.

1988 Canadian federal election
Party	Candidate	Votes	%	±%	Expenditures
Liberal	Diane Marleau	17,879	42.03	+0.9	$37,582
New Democratic	Bill Major	11,811	27.77	+2.0	$36,732
Progressive Conservative	Bob Fera	9,356	21.99	−10.1	$43,024
Confederation of Regions	S. Brent Ridley	3,391	7.97		$8,808
Communist	Mike Phillips	102	0.24		$2,044
Total valid votes		42,539	100.00		
Total rejected ballots		234	0.55		
Turnout		42,773	73.56		
Electors on the lists		58,144			
Note: The +/- totals are factored for redistribution.

1984 Canadian federal election
Party	Candidate	Votes	%	±%
Liberal	Doug Frith	18,012	41.30	-14.40
Progressive Conservative	John A. Dediana	14,100	32.33	+20.50
New Democratic	Harriet Conroy	11,185	25.65	-5.51
Rhinoceros	Phil Moon Popovich	241	0.55	-0.18
Communist	Bruce Magnuson	75	0.17	+0.02
Total valid votes		43,613	100.00	

1980 Canadian federal election
Party	Candidate	Votes	%	±%
Liberal	Doug Frith	21,954	55.70	-6.17
New Democratic	Mort Paterson	12,280	31.15	-3.06
Progressive Conservative	Murray Watts	4,661	11.82	-1.75
Rhinoceros	Raymond Lalonde	288	0.73	
Marxist–Leninist	Don Fleming	93	0.24	+0.11
Independent	David De Launay	83	0.21	
Communist	Steve Amsel	58	0.15	-0.05
Total valid votes		39,417	100.00	

1979 Canadian federal election
Party	Candidate	Votes	%	±%
Liberal	James Jerome	20,634	49.53	-3.08
New Democratic	Mort Paterson	14,252	34.21	+4.50
Progressive Conservative	Peter Hope	5,656	13.58	-3.63
Independent	Jerome Davis	599	1.44	
Libertarian	George Christakos	383	0.92	
Communist	Steve Amsel	82	0.20	-0.28
Marxist–Leninist	Don Fleming	53	0.13	
Total valid votes		41,659	100.00	

1974 Canadian federal election
Party	Candidate	Votes	%	±%
Liberal	James Jerome	23,374	52.61	-2.45
New Democratic	Don Scott	13,200	29.71	-1.71
Progressive Conservative	John Goodearle	7,646	17.21	+3.69
Communist	Ed McDonald	210	0.47	
Total valid votes		44,430	100.00	

1972 Canadian federal election
Party	Candidate	Votes	%	±%
Liberal	James Jerome	24,091	55.06	+2.78
New Democratic	Garry Clarke	13,748	31.42	-1.16
Progressive Conservative	Adam Borovich	5,913	13.51	-1.62
Total valid votes		43,752	100.00	

1968 Canadian federal election
Party	Candidate	Votes	%	±%
Liberal	James Jerome	19,672	52.28	+7.70
New Democratic	Bud Germa	12,260	32.58	-12.55
Progressive Conservative	Robert Desmarais	5,696	15.14	+6.48
Total valid votes		37,628	100.00	

Canadian federal by-election, 29 May 1967
Party	Candidate	Votes	%	±%
On Mr. Mitchell's death, 4 January 1967
New Democratic	Bud Germa	12,982	45.13	+8.90
Liberal	James Jerome	12,823	44.58	-0.07
Progressive Conservative	Colin Caswell	2,491	8.66	-10.47
Independent	G.W. Bill Passi	244	0.85	
Social Credit	Donald A. Land	225	0.78	
Total valid votes		28,765	100.00	

1965 Canadian federal election
Party	Candidate	Votes	%	±%
Liberal	Rodger Mitchell	13,247	44.65	-4.17
New Democratic	Bud Germa	10,749	36.23	+19.31
Progressive Conservative	Bruce Kerr	5,675	19.13	-7.45
Total valid votes		29,671	100.00	

1963 Canadian federal election
Party	Candidate	Votes	%	±%
Liberal	Rodger Mitchell	15,794	48.82	-8.95
Progressive Conservative	Tom Dixon	8,597	26.57	+1.28
New Democratic	John Masih	5,472	16.91	+2.76
Social Credit	Murray R. Maher	2,180	6.74	+3.96
Communist	Peter Boychuck	311	0.96	
Total valid votes		32,354	100.00	

1962 Canadian federal election
Party	Candidate	Votes	%	±%
Liberal	Rodger Mitchell	17,628	57.77	+6.63
Progressive Conservative	Hugh Doig	7,719	25.29	-9.66
New Democratic	John Masih	4,320	14.16	+0.24
Social Credit	Elmer Dell Bolick	849	2.78	
Total valid votes		30,516	100.00	

Note: NDP vote is compared to CCF vote in 1958 election.

1958 Canadian federal election
Party	Candidate	Votes	%	±%
Liberal	Rodger Mitchell	16,216	51.13	+5.14
Progressive Conservative	R.M. Mitchell	11,084	34.95	-5.31
Co-operative Commonwealth	Bill Ellis	4,413	13.92	+0.16
Total valid votes		31,713	100.00	

1957 Canadian federal election
Party	Candidate	Votes	%	±%
Liberal	Rodger Mitchell	11,927	45.99	-11.24
Progressive Conservative	R.M. Mitchell	10,440	40.26	+13.98
Co-operative Commonwealth	Ray H. Jacobs	3,566	13.75	-2.74
Total valid votes		25,933	100.00	

1953 Canadian federal election
Party	Candidate	Votes	%	±%
Liberal	Rodger Mitchell	12,193	57.23	+13.21
Progressive Conservative	Laurier Lamoureux	5,598	26.28	+3.73
Co-operative Commonwealth	Willard H. Evoy	3,514	16.49	+0.40
Total valid votes		21,305	100.00	

1949 Canadian federal election
Party	Candidate	Votes	%
Liberal	Léo Gauthier	15,636	44.02
Progressive Conservative	Patrick Joseph McAndrew	8,009	22.55
Farmer–Labour	Robert Carlin	6,161	17.34
Co-operative Commonwealth	Willard H. Evoy	5,717	16.09
Total valid votes		35,523	100.00

== See also ==
- Historical federal electoral districts of Canada
- List of Canadian electoral districts
