= Viviane Lapointe =

Canadian politician

Viviane Lapointe MP

Member of Parliament for Sudbury
- Incumbent
- Assumed office September 20, 2021
- Preceded by: Paul Lefebvre

Personal details
- Born: Elliot Lake, Ontario, Canada
- Party: Liberal

Viviane Lapointe is a Canadian politician, who was elected to the Canadian House of Commons in the 2021 Canadian federal election. She represents the electoral district of Sudbury as a member of the Liberal Party of Canada.

== Biography ==
Lapointe was born in Elliot Lake, Ontario, where her father was a miner. She later moved to the New Sudbury neighbourhood, where she grew up, graduating from École secondaire Macdonald-Cartier.

She worked for the Ministry of Northern Development and Mines before later becoming executive director of Community Living Greater Sudbury.

In June 2021, she announced her intention to seek the Liberal Party of Canada nomination for the 2021 Canadian federal election, seeking to replace outgoing Liberal MP Paul Lefebvre. After successfully winning the nomination over Cinéfest Sudbury International Film Festival director Tammy Frick, she went on to win her riding in the 2021 election with 34 per cent of the vote.

== Committees ==
- Standing Committee on National Defence
- Standing Committee on Industry and Technology
- Standing Committee on Natural Resources

== Electoral record ==
=== Sudbury ===
2025 Canadian federal election: Sudbury
** Preliminary results — Not yet official **
Party	Candidate	Votes	%	±%	Expenditures
Liberal	Viviane Lapointe	31,329	51.79	+16.81	
Conservative	Ian Symington	23,748	39.25	+11.43	
New Democratic	Nadia Verrelli	4,650	7.69	–21.21	
People's	Nicholas Bonderoff	770	1.27	–4.85	
Total valid votes/expense limit					
Total rejected ballots					
Turnout		60,497	68.17		
Eligible voters		88,742			
Liberal notional hold		Swing		+2.69	
Source: Elections Canada

2021 Canadian federal election: Sudbury
Party	Candidate	Votes	%	±%	Expenditures
Liberal	Viviane Lapointe	15,871	34.5	-6.4	$81,822.79
New Democratic	Nadia Verrelli	13,569	29.5	+0.6	$82,941.50
Conservative	Ian Symington	12,747	27.7	+7.1	$89,028.04
People's	Colette Andréa Methé	2,735	5.9	+4.1	$3,349.70
Green	David Robert Robinson	940	2.0	-4.7	$0.00
Independent	J. David Popescu	111	0.2	+0.05	$180.22
Total valid votes		45,973			
Total rejected ballots		313			
Turnout		46,286	62.18		
Eligible voters		74,386			
Source: Elections Canada
