= Manitoulin Secondary School =

Location
- 107 Bay St; M'Chigeeng, Ontario, P0P 1G0; Canada; 45.83247°N 82.16268°W

Information
- Founded: 1969
- School board: Rainbow District School Board
- Area trustee: Margaret Stringer
- School number: 924679
- Principal: Jamie Mohamed
- Enrollment: 419 (March 2020)
- Colours: Black and gold
- Team name: Mustangs
- Website: www.rainbowschools.ca/school/manitoulin-secondary-school/

Manitoulin Secondary School, is a secondary school located on M'Chigeeng First Nation, Ontario, on Manitoulin Island, and is approximately 2 hours from downtown Sudbury.

The school, built in 1969, is within by the Rainbow District School Board's jurisdiction.

== History ==
Research conducted over a 10-year period in the 1970s revealed a trend at Manitoulin Secondary School of directing First Nations students into the lower academic streams. The study also showed nearly all suspensions and expulsions were of First Nations students, despite them forming less than half of the student body. As a result, Wikwemikong removed their children from Rainbow District and formed their own high school in their community, resulting in a significant decline in the student population at Manitoulin Secondary School.

In 2015, an Indigenous student at the school left after receiving backlash for reporting a racist incident from school administrators.

In 2018, a fight broke out on the school grounds involving 50 students, both European-Canadian and Indigenous. The Chief of M'Chigeeng First Nation wrote an open letter stating, "that this incident is an indicator of a deeper, more disturbing reality, which is underlying racism that has now reared its ugly head yet again." The school hosted an "anti-racism rally" in response to these events. Despite involvement in the fight from both sides, police only charged Indigenous students.

== See also ==
- Education in Ontario
- List of secondary schools in Ontario
