= Chelmsford Valley District Composite School =

Coordinates: 46.5752°N 81.193°W

Location
- 3594 Highway 144; Chelmsford, Ontario, P0M 1L0; Canada

Information
- Opened: 1953
- School board: Rainbow District School Board
- Area trustee: Anita Gibson
- Principal: Patrick Hopkin
- Grades: K to 12
- Enrollment: 680 (October 31, 2024)
- Website: https://cvdcs.rainbowschools.ca/

Chelmsford Valley District Composite School (CVDCS) is a K to 12 school located in the community of Chelmsford, Ontario, part of Greater Sudbury. The school opened in 1953. CVDCS offers a Bilingual Trades program as its magnet program. The school also offers the French Immersion program.

The school is overseen by the Rainbow District School Board.

== See also ==
- Education in Ontario
- List of secondary schools in Ontario
