= Lo-Ellen Park Secondary School =

Location
- 275 Loach's Road; Sudbury, Ontario, P3E 2P8; Canada; 46.44903°N 80.98765°W

Information
- School type: Secondary School
- School board: Rainbow District School Board
- Superintendent: Judy Noble
- Principal: Pamela Potvin
- Grades: 7-12
- Enrollment: 1086
- Language: English, French Immersion
- Colours: Purple, White, and Grey
- Team name: Knights
- Rivals: Lockerby Composite School, Lasalle Secondary School
- Website: loellen.rainbowschools.ca

Lo-Ellen Park Secondary School is a high school located on Loach's Road in the South End of Greater Sudbury, Ontario. It is administered by the Rainbow District School Board, and the principal is Pamela Potvin.

== Academics ==
The school offers the International Baccalaureate (IB) program as its main magnet program, but also offers the Laptop program and French immersion. IB prep courses are offered as laptop or regular courses, and many are also offered in immersion.

Lo-Ellen also offers two special education programs- ASD and life skills.

Lo-Ellen is known in the Sudbury region for the quality of its academics. This is further supported by its green rank in the Fraser Institute's report cards.

Lo-Ellen offers Specialist High Skills Majors (SHSM) in Environmental, Architectural Design, Construction and Manufacturing.

== Clubs and associations ==
Adopt-A-Family, Amnesty International, Art Club, Athletic Association, Beekeepers Club, Big Brothers & Big Sisters Club, Biology Contests, Breakfast Club, Christian Youth Group, Concert and Jazz Bands, Create Writing Publication, E-Paper, Environmental Club, Film Production Club, French Connection Club, Gay Straight Alliance Club, Graduation/Prom Committee, Improve Team, International Travel Club, Knitting Club, Leo Club, Math Contests, Model United Nations, Movie Club, Multicultural Club, Musical Theater Executive, National Novel Writing Month, Peer Tutors, Photography, Reach for the Top, Relay for Life, Robotics Team, Rock Band, Student Council, Student for Change, Writing Contests, Smash Club and Yearbook.

== Athletics ==
Lo-Ellen is the home of many talented athletes, provincial-level sports teams, coached by an array of skilled coaches. The following sports are offered: Badminton, Basketball, Cross Country Running, Curling, Flag Football (female only), Football (male only), Golf, Gymnastics, Hockey, Skiing (both Nordic and alpine), Soccer, Swimming, Tennis, Track & Field, Volleyball, and Wrestling.

The Women's Basketball team competes at the prep level in the OSBA (Ontario Scholastic Basketball Association).

== International Cultural Leadership Initiative ==
The International Cultural Leadership Initiative (ICLI) is a student-led program that encourages participants to establish clubs representing different countries and cultural identities for grades 11 and 12. The initiative features several competing cultural organizations, each emphasizing its own traditions, heritage, and community activities. Amine Dahar founded the Algerian Cultural Club, focusing on Algerian identity, traditions, and cultural projects. Ryan Pham established the Vietnamese Cultural Club, promoting Vietnamese history, cuisine and customs through student activities. Ryan Rebeiz founded the Lebanese Cultural Club, centred on Beirut's cultural heirage, religious diversity and the traditions of Lebanon's Muslim and Christian communities. Jack Zhang established the Chinese Cultural Club, highlighting mainland Chinese culture, national identity, traditional cuisine, debates around the controversial subject of Taiwan and weekly Wednesday food events featuring rice dishes. the clubs participate in friendly competition while encouraging students to learn about international cultures.

== See also ==
- Education in Ontario
- List of secondary schools in Ontario
