= Bud Germa =

Canadian politician (1920–1993)

MP for Sudbury
- In office 1967–1968
- Preceded by: Rodger Mitchell
- Succeeded by: James Jerome

MPP for Sudbury
- In office 1971–1981
- Preceded by: Elmer Sopha
- Succeeded by: Jim Gordon

Personal details
- Born: Melville Carlyle Germa; August 5, 1920 Creighton, Ontario, Canada
- Died: June 17, 1993 (aged 72)
- Party: New Democrat
- Occupation: Labour organizer

Melville Carlyle "Bud" Germa (August 5, 1920 — June 17, 1993) was a Canadian politician, who represented the electoral district of Sudbury from 1967 to 1968 in the House of Commons of Canada, and from 1971 to 1981 in the Legislative Assembly of Ontario. He was a member of the New Democratic Party.

Before entering politics, Germa was a labourer and union organizer in Sudbury, and served on Sudbury City Council. In 1964, while serving on city council, he advocated for Northern Ontario to separate from Ontario to become its own province.

== Federal politics ==
Germa first ran as an NDP candidate in the 1965 election, losing to Liberal incumbent Rodger Mitchell. Mitchell died in 1967, however, and in the resulting byelection, Germa won the seat. The results were subject to a judicial recount, due to Germa's narrow margin of victory over Liberal candidate James Jerome, but the recount upheld Germa's victory. Unusually, but legally at the time, he did not resign his city council seat while serving as an MP, but held both positions concurrently.

However, in the national election the following year, Jerome defeated Germa to reclaim the seat for the Liberals.

== Provincial politics ==
Germa subsequently ran in the 1971 provincial election, winning the seat and representing Sudbury in the provincial legislative assembly as a member of the Ontario New Democratic Party.

In 1972, he criticized the appointment of Jim Jessiman and Gaston Demers to the board of Ontario Northland.

In 1975, Ontario Progressive Conservative Party MPP Frank Drea was forced to apologize in the legislature after claiming in a speech on gun control that some members of the opposition caucuses were members of "Communist organizations"; although Drea did not publicly name on the record who he was talking about, he was overheard by journalists in the press gallery telling a colleague that he was referring to Germa.

He was reelected in the 1975 election, in a closely watched three-way race against Liberal Elmer Sopha, his predecessor as MPP, and Conservative Joe Fabbro, at the time the city's mayor. In this term, he served as chair of the legislature's standing committee on public accounts. In 1976, he strongly opposed the government's plan to sell off the former Burwash Industrial Farm site near Sudbury, although after a journalist from CKNC-TV interviewed him about the issue on the Burwash site, Progressive Conservative MPP Margaret Scrivener accused him of illegal trespassing.

In 1977, after a list of doctors' billing fees to the Ontario Health Insurance Plan was released to the media, the Tories attempted to have Germa deposed as chair of the public accounts committee, although the move failed.

He was reelected to a third term in the 1977 election.

He was defeated in the 1981 election by Jim Gordon of the Ontario Progressive Conservative Party.

== Electoral record ==
1965 Canadian federal election
Party	Candidate	Votes	%	±%
Liberal	Rodger Mitchell	13,247	44.65	-4.17
New Democratic	Bud Germa	10,749	36.23	+19.31
Progressive Conservative	Bruce Kerr	5,675	19.13	-7.45
Total valid votes		29,671	100.00	

Canadian federal by-election, 29 May 1967
Party	Candidate	Votes	%	±%
On Rodger Mitchell's death, 4 January 1967
New Democratic	Bud Germa	12,982	45.13	+8.90
Liberal	James Jerome	12,823	44.58	-0.07
Progressive Conservative	Colin Caswell	2,491	8.66	-10.47
Independent	G.W. Bill Passi	244	0.85	
Social Credit	Donald A. Land	225	0.78	
Total valid votes		28,765	100.00	

1968 Canadian federal election
Party	Candidate	Votes	%	±%
Liberal	James Jerome	19,672	52.28	+7.70
New Democratic	Bud Germa	12,260	32.58	-12.55
Progressive Conservative	Robert Desmarais	5,696	15.14	+6.48
Total valid votes		37,628	100.00	
