= École Secondaire Catholique Champlain =

Coordinates: 46.57234°N 81.19962°W

Information
- Religious affiliation(s): Catholicism
- Grades: 9-12
- Enrollment: c. 300
- Language: French

École secondaire catholique Champlain (E.S.C Champlain) is a French Catholic school in the region of Chelmsford, Ontario. Champlain is a secondary school owned and operated by the Conseil scolaire de district catholique du Nouvel-Ontario. The school has an estimated 300 students ranging from grade 9 to grade 12.

== See also ==
- Education in Ontario
- List of secondary schools in Ontario
