= Lasalle Secondary School =

Lasalle Secondary

Location
- 1545 Kennedy Street; Sudbury, Ontario, P3A 2G1; Canada; 46°31′30.91″N 80°56′21.96″W

Information
- School type: Secondary
- Motto: Nulli Secondus (Second to None)
- Founded: 1962
- School board: Rainbow District School Board
- Area trustee: Dena Morrison
- Principal: Kristina Rivard Gobbo
- Grades: 7-12
- Enrollment: 1113
- Language: English, French Immersion
- Colour
- Mascot: Lancer
- Website: lasalle.rainbowschools.ca

Lasalle Secondary School is a public secondary school in the New Sudbury neighbourhood of Greater Sudbury, Ontario, Canada. Established in 1962, the school serves students in grades 7–12 and is operated by the Rainbow District School Board.

As of 2026, 1113 full-time equivalent students are enrolled at the school.

== Curriculum ==
Lasalle Secondary School offers instruction in English and French immersion programs.

The school also offers Specialist High Skills Major (SHSM) programs in five fields, including energy, business, sports, construction, and millwrighting, as well as a Sport and Healthy Active Living (SHAL) program.

== Former headteachers ==
There have been many changes in the top administration of the school in recent years.

Year	Principal	Trustee
2005-2006	Scott Darling	Dena Morrison
2006-2007	Ada Della Penta	Dena Morrison
2007-2008	Craig Runciman^{1}	Dena Morrison
2008-2009		Dena Morrison
2009-2010	Jeff McKibbon	Dena Morrison
– present	Kristina Rivard Gobbo	Dena Morrison

== See also ==
- Education in Ontario
- List of secondary schools in Ontario
