= James Jerome =

Canadian politician (1933–2005)

The Honourable James Jerome PC

28th Speaker of the House of Commons
- In office September 30, 1974 – December 14, 1979
- Preceded by: Lucien Lamoureux
- Succeeded by: Jeanne Sauvé

MP for Sudbury
- In office September 9, 1968 – December 14, 1979
- Preceded by: Bud Germa
- Succeeded by: Doug Frith

Personal details
- Born: James Alexander Jerome; March 4, 1933 Kingston, Ontario, Canada
- Died: August 21, 2005 (aged 72)
- Party: Liberal
- Occupation: Politician; lawyer

James Alexander Jerome PC (March 4, 1933 – August 21, 2005) was a Canadian jurist and former politician and the 28th speaker of the House of Commons.

== Life and career ==
After receiving his law degree from Osgoode Hall in Toronto, Jerome began his law practice in Sudbury, Ontario. In 1966, he won a seat on Sudbury's city council and, the next year, attempted to win election to the House of Commons of Canada in a by-election but was defeated. He took the seat in the 1968 general election, however, and became the Liberal Member of Parliament (MP) for the Sudbury riding.

After the 1972 election, Jerome became Chairman of the Standing Committee on Justice and Legal Affairs. Since there was a minority government in place, the opposition had a majority of members on the Committee and he had to remain impartial and balance the wishes of all parties in order to win approval for legislation.

His success in this role led Prime Minister Pierre Trudeau to appoint him as Speaker of the House of Commons following the 1974 election.

In the 1979 election, Jerome considered following the precedent set by his predecessor, Lucien Lamoureux, by running as an independent as is the custom of the Speaker of the House of Commons of the United Kingdom. He decided to run as a Liberal, however, and was re-elected. The Progressive Conservative Party formed a minority government under Joe Clark's leadership. Despite the change in government, they decided to keep Jerome as Speaker.

After the Clark government was defeated in a motion of no confidence in December 1979, Jerome decided not to run in the ensuing general election. In January 1980, Clark appointed him Associate Chief Justice of the Federal Court in Ottawa. He remained in this position until his retirement in 1998.
