= Troy Crowder =

Canadian ice hockey player (born 1968)

- Born: May 3, 1968 (age 58) Sudbury, Ontario, Canada
- Height: 6 ft 4 in (193 cm)
- Weight: 238 lb (108 kg; 17 st 0 lb)
- Position: Right wing
- Shot: Right
- Played for: Vancouver Canucks; Los Angeles Kings; Detroit Red Wings; New Jersey Devils
- NHL draft: 108th overall, 1986; New Jersey Devils
- Playing career: 1987–1997

Troy Crowder (born May 3, 1968) is a Canadian former professional ice hockey right winger who played parts of seven seasons in the National Hockey League with the New Jersey Devils, Detroit Red Wings, Los Angeles Kings, and Vancouver Canucks from 1987–88 to 1996–97.

Crowder was born in Sudbury, Ontario. He was drafted 108th overall by the Devils in the 1986 NHL entry draft. He compiled 433 career penalty minutes in 150 NHL games played. He also scored nine goals and sixteen points.

In 2022, he was criminally convicted of uttering a forged document in connection with a fraudulent insurance claim.

== Politics ==
In June 2017, Crowder announced that he was seeking the Progressive Conservative Party of Ontario nomination in the provincial riding of Sudbury for the 2018 Ontario general elections. He was acclaimed as the candidate on June 29, 2017. Crowder placed second in the election, behind Ontario New Democratic Party candidate Jamie West.

Following his defeat in the provincial election, Crowder registered to run for mayor of Greater Sudbury in the 2018 municipal election. He finished fifth in that race. He ran again in the 2026 municipal election, where he finished 4th.

== Insurance Fraud ==
In 2019, a boathouse at Crowder's cottage collapsed due to snow, destroying a fridge and a cedar-strip canoe inside. He submitted a form to his insurance company, ostensibly signed by his estranged wife, removing her from the insurance policy. It was later revealed that his wife's signature had been forged. Months later, Crowder obtained an estimate for a contractor to demolish the boathouse. He then submitted that document to his insurance company, including a cheque number for a payment that had never been made, claiming reimbursement for work that had never been completed. Relying on Crowder's submissions, his insurer directed three cheques to him personally: $11,074 for the demolition work, which he had done himself with some assistance; $6,750 for the loss of the cedar-strip canoe and fridge; and $84,185.01 for the loss of the boathouse.

On December 14, 2022, Crowder pleaded guilty to knowingly submitting a forged document as if it was genuine. He received an eight-month conditional sentence, the first four of which being house arrest, and a one-year probation order. In exchange for the guilty plea, four other fraud-related charges were withdrawn by the Crown prosecutor. Crowder was also required to pay his estranged wife $45,467.50, representing her half of the insurance proceeds. In addition, he was required to reimburse his insurer $11,074 for the fraudulent invoice.

== Career statistics ==
			Regular season					Playoffs
Season	Team	League	GP	G	A	Pts	PIM	GP	G	A	Pts	PIM
1985–86	Hamilton Steelhawks	OHL	56	4	4	8	178	—	—	—	—	—
1986–87	Belleville Bulls	OHL	21	5	5	10	52	—	—	—	—	—
1986–87	North Bay Centennials	OHL	35	6	11	17	90	23	3	9	12	99
1987–88	New Jersey Devils	NHL	—	—	—	—	—	1	0	0	0	12
1987–88	North Bay Centennials	OHL	9	1	2	3	44	—	—	—	—	—
1987–88	Belleville Bulls	OHL	46	12	27	39	103	6	2	3	5	24
1987–88	Utica Devils	AHL	3	0	0	0	15	—	—	—	—	—
1988–89	Utica Devils	AHL	62	6	4	10	152	2	0	0	0	25
1989–90	New Jersey Devils	NHL	10	0	0	0	23	2	0	0	0	10
1989–90	Nashville Knights	ECHL	3	0	0	0	15	—	—	—	—	—
1990–91	New Jersey Devils	NHL	59	6	3	9	182	—	—	—	—	—
1991–92	Detroit Red Wings	NHL	7	0	0	0	35	1	0	0	0	0
1994–95	Los Angeles Kings	NHL	29	1	2	3	99	—	—	—	—	—
1995–96	Los Angeles Kings	NHL	15	1	0	1	42	—	—	—	—	—
1996–97	Vancouver Canucks	NHL	30	1	2	3	52	—	—	—	—	—
1996–97	Syracuse Crunch	AHL	2	0	0	0	0	—	—	—	—	—
1997–98	Hannover Scorpions	DEL	13	1	1	2	72	6	1	1	2	33
1998–99	Hershey Bears	AHL	25	0	1	1	44	—	—	—	—	—
1998–99	London Knights	BISL	16	2	3	5	71	6	1	1	2	4
2002–03	Saint-Jean Mission	QSPHL	4	0	2	2	0	—	—	—	—	—
NHL totals			150	9	7	16	433	4	0	0	0	22

== Electoral results ==
2018 Ontario general election: Sudbury
Party	Candidate	Votes	%	±%	Expenditures
New Democratic	Jamie West	17,386	48.07	+12.92	$26,455
Progressive Conservative	Troy Crowder	8,405	23.24	+15.73	$44,759
Liberal	Glenn Thibeault	8,108	22.42	-18.83	$97,933
Green	David Robinson	1,504	4.16	+0.92	$8,082
Consensus Ontario	Mila Chavez Wong	284	0.79	N/A	
Libertarian	James Wendler	212	0.59	N/A	
None of the Above	David Sylvestre	186	0.51	N/A	$0
Independent	J. David Popescu	82	0.23	+0.14	
Total valid votes		36,167	98.95	–0.50	
Total rejected, unmarked and declined ballots		382	1.05	+0.50	
Turnout		36,549	54.22	+14.53	
Eligible voters		67,410			
New Democratic gain from Liberal		Swing		-1.37	
Source: Elections Ontario
