= Collège Notre-Dame (Sudbury) =

Private Catholic secondary school in Sudbury, Ontario (Canada)

Location
- 100 Levis Street; Sudbury, Ontario, P3C 2H1; Canada; 46°29′54″N 80°59′35″W

Information
- School type: catholic school (government funded), Separate high school
- Motto: Duc In Altum
- Religious affiliation: Catholic
- Founded: 1948
- School board: Conseil scolaire de district catholique du Nouvel-Ontario
- School district: Zone 5
- Area trustee: Raymond Joanisse; Josée Bisson; Monique Aubin-Gagné
- School number: 698989
- Principal: Liane Kutchaw and Geneviève Diotte
- Grades: 9-12
- Enrollment: 334 (June 30, 2026)
- Language: French
- Campus: Urban
- Colours: Blue, White and Yellow
- Mascot: Alfred The Alouette
- Team name: Les Alouettes
- Website: cnd.nouvelon.ca

Collège Notre-Dame is a [catholic] separate high school in Sudbury, Ontario, Canada. The school is part of the Conseil scolaire de district catholique du Nouvel-Ontario and has a student population of 334 as of June 2026. It’s renowned for its high-quality STEM and business courses, as well as sports, more specifically, volleyball, hockey and Flag Football. It encourages the Catholic religion as well as openness to modern society and instills discipline into its students.

== History ==
Collège Notre-Dame is a French-language Catholic high school in Sudbury, Ontario. Founded in 1920 as Le Pensionnat Notre-Dame-du-Bon-Conseil, an all-girls school by the Sisters of Charity in Ottawa, enrollment grew from just 50 Grade 9 students in 1948, when it was renamed as Collège Notre-Dame, growing from then to around 1960 to 340 students, when they had to restructure and provide a larger building to support this enrollment. Showing how quickly the school became a major educational institution. A historical moment was the human chain of students who helped pass along furniture from the old building to the new one in 1960, speeding up the process of restructuring. The community also largely played a role in the funding of the construction; the original construction was partly funded by public donations, with the community raising about $300,000, a significant amount at the time, which demonstrated how much the community values a French Catholic education. The school became co-educational in 1967 after the Closure of Collège du Sacré-Coeur. Despite enrollment challenges in the 1970s, College Notre-Dame continued to grow through innovative science programs, for which the school received the Roberta Bondar Award. The new building was very modern for its time, featuring state-of-the-art biology, chemistry, and physics laboratory classrooms, which then encouraged many students to pursue careers in STEM. Sister Rachelle Watier, was principal for many years, played a key role in guiding the school through its transition into the publicly funded Catholic school system while keeping its traditions and values. From that moment on, it expanded and became one of the largest French high schools in the Greater Sudbury region. In 1987, the school finally joined the Catholic school board, with an enrollment of around 1,000 students. The school continued to be owned by the Sisters until its sale to the Conseil scolaire catholique Nouvelon in 2002. Today, it continues to provide French catholic education in Sudbury.

== Academics ==
Collège Notre-Dame is renowned for its emphasis on academia and preparation for post-secondary education, more specifically the university route, with most of its graduating students heading into STEM fields, education, business and medicine. They have a trimester-based year, different from the standard semestered systems in most secondary schools in Ontario, meaning students follow 8 courses year-round, rather than 4 per semester. Collège Notre-Dame offers comprehensive science and mathematics courses with guidance from fantastic teachers and educational assistants to better prepare its students for their post-secondary routes. CND has in the past only had a SHSM program in Business, adding to its academic values in preparing students for university-bound careers, in 2016, the school introduced the first of its kind SHSM in Sports, making it the first French-language secondary school in Ontario to offer it as a major. SHSMs are programs offered by high schools that allow students to specialize in a topic or area of study of their choice. Not only is this a way of personalizing the secondary school experience, but students also gain knowledge and skills beyond what they would normally acquire in a standard high school curriculum and the Conseil scolaire catholique du Nouvel-Ontario currently offers nine Specialist High Skills Major programs: Health and Wellness at ÉS du Sacré-Cœur (Sudbury), ÉSC l’Horizon (Val Caron), ÉSC Champlain (Chelmsford), and ÉS Notre-Dame-du-Sault (Sault Ste. Marie); Business at Collège Notre-Dame (Sudbury), Mining at ÉSC Horizon and ESC Champlain; Justice, Community Safety, and Emergency Services at ES du Sacré-Coeur and Sports at Collège Notre-Dame.

== Music ==
The school offers a great music program, originally headed by Renee Allaire from 2006 to 2025, before being taken over by Melanie Makela, who kept the spirit alive after Renee took another position. The school band "Le Bistro", influenced by rock, blues, country and more specifically francophone music to help students discover the value of being a French musician. "Le Bistro," in the past, played open concerts for the public as their final exam, as this has changed under the new ownership of the program. Although sad, the band still lights up the stage for parents and personnel to watch. The band participates in numerous music festivals, which gather music students from various school boards, those being: Melomanie and Quand ca nous chante. They often perform at local events such as the Rotary Park Fundraiser event, which takes place around Christmas time, and perform at retirement homes such as Pioneer Manor in Sudbury.

== In the community ==
Collège Notre-Dame is currently headed by Liane Kutchaw and is known throughout the city for its work in fundraising for the Northern Cancer Research Foundation, headed in Sudbury. Throughout 2005-2026, the school raised over $700,000 CDN for the foundation through such events as the blitz, where a large majority of the students went throughout the city, on assigned streets, acquiring door-to-door donations. In 2010, the annual Blitz took place on May 17 and raised $20,100. In 2014, the annual Blitz took place on February 20 and raised $26,000.

== Sports ==
Sports are an important part of CND culture; it is one of the selling points most parents use as a reference when aiding their child in choosing a high school. CND has scored many victories in its years, notably when the Collège Notre-Dame boys' hockey team captured their school's first-ever title at the Franco-Ontarien tournament, held in April 2013 in Hamilton. The senior boys basketball team from College Notre Dame in Sudbury saw some early season success, winning a championship banner at the Arthur Gabor Classic Basketball Tournament in North Bay in 2022. The Alouettes started the event by defeating Ecole secondaire Odyssee of North Bay, 73-27, then Timmins High, 52-32 to qualify for the championship round. There, they secured a 73-19 win over Espanola High School, then a 69-43 semifinal victory in a rematch with Timmins High, before defeating their crosstown rivals from Lasalle Secondary School, 61-47.

== Uniforms ==
The students were required to wear classic uniforms until changed in recent years. Students used to be mandated to wear a navy blue cardigan or sweater vest, a red tie and grey pants for boys, and a navy blue cardigan or sweater vest and grey pants or skirt for girls, complete with a white shirt for both sexes. Students are now allowed to wear grey pants and grey shorts, and the uniform now consists of polo t-shirts in white and navy, rugby sweaters, quarter-zip sweaters and hoodies. CND allows students to wear "swag" which consists of unique designs of the school logo, which they are allowed to wear over the uniform pants on Fridays, these "swag" pieces are provided by the retailer Greater Sports in Sudbury and the standard pieces of the uniforms for this school are provided by McCarthy Uniforms.

== See also ==
- Education in Ontario
- List of secondary schools in Ontario
