= Lively District Secondary School =

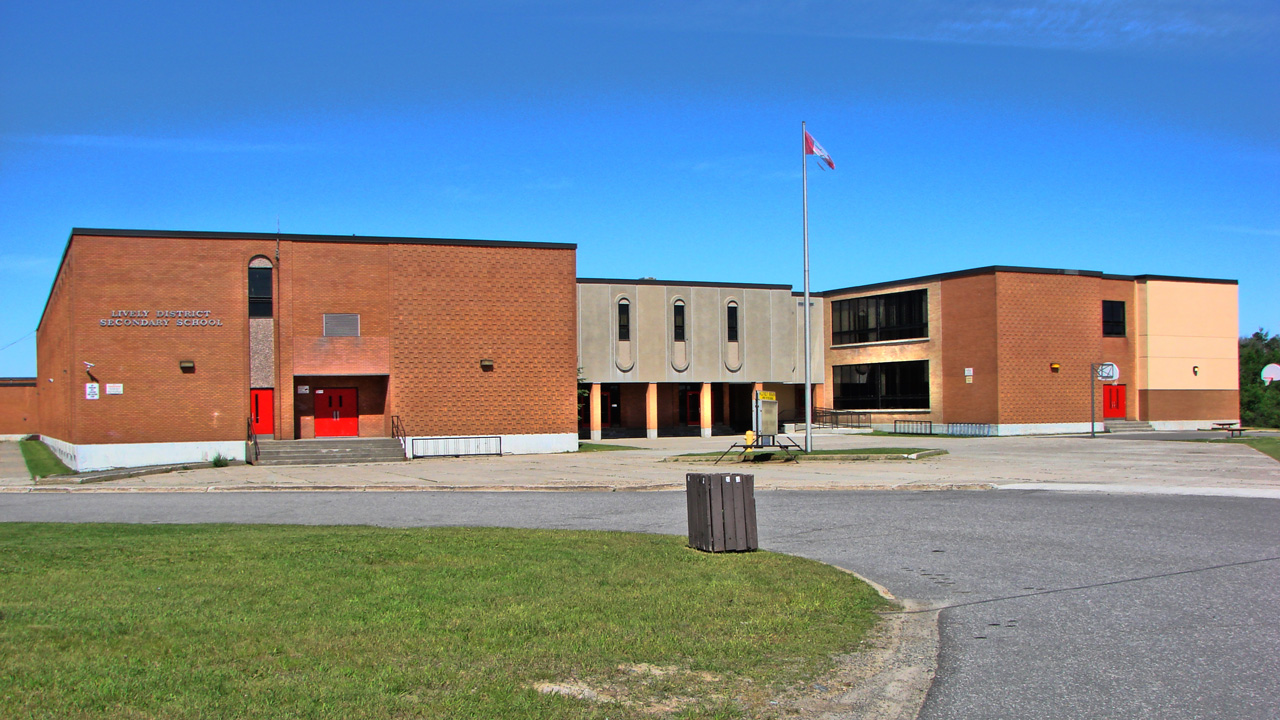

Location
- 265 Fifth Avenue; Lively, Ontario, P3Y 1N1; Canada; 46°26′12.17″N 81°8′29.09″W

Information
- School type: High school
- Founded: April 8, 1957
- School board: Rainbow District School Board
- Superintendent: Bruce Bourget
- Area trustee: Anita Gibson
- Principal: Victoria Zymantas
- Grades: 7–12
- Enrollment: 373
- Language: English
- Schedule type: Semestered
- Colours: Black and gold
- Nickname: LDSS, Lively High
- Team name: Hawks
- Website: www.livelydistrictsecondaryschool.com

Lively District Secondary School is a high school located in the community of Lively, Ontario, Canada, within the city of Greater Sudbury. Overseen by the Rainbow District School Board, it offers six different programs which focus on mining and health and wellness, among others. It has both grade 7 and 8 as well as the high school. LDSS is known for its athletic success in such sports as football, flag football, volleyball, gymnastics, hockey and track and field.

== History ==
The construction of Lively District Secondary School started in the spring of 1956. It wasn't ready for occupancy until February 1957. The official school opening was April 8, 1957.

There were only one hundred and twenty students between grades nine and thirteen on the first day of classes in 1957. The enrollment for the 1999–2000 school year was about five hundred and fifty students. Additions weren't started until 1964-1965 and the major additions weren't done until 1970. These additions added a major part of the school as it stands today. During the tornado of August 1970, the west wing that was under construction was blown down and had to be rebuilt.

In May 1972, the name Lively High School was changed to Lively District Secondary School. The school added a restaurant-style cafeteria in January 1997 where hot food is served daily including fries and soup. It was named the "Cyber Caf".

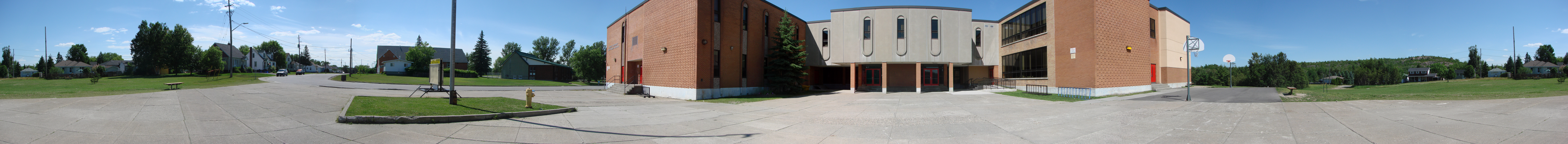
A panoramic shot of the front of Lively District Secondary School.

== Secondary Programs ==
The AP program is a program of enrichment gearing students for advanced standing or placement in affiliated Universities. Successful completion of this four-year program will distinguish students for scholarship opportunities and provide opportunities to obtain first-year University accreditation.

French Immersion Language Courses - Lively District Secondary School offers 4 French Immersion Language Courses. These courses include Grade 9, Grade 10, Grade 11, and Grade 12 Français.

The Specialist High Skills Major in Environment provides students with a focus on sustainability in a range of future careers and personal lifestyle choices that lead to the concept, "enough for all forever". As a gold-certified Ontario Eco-school with a depth of staff and community expertise in the Environment, students are engaged into project work, leading to coop placements, employment, college or university studies in programs focused on the Environment.

The Specialist High Skills Major in Mining focuses on students whose pathways include university, college and apprenticeship programs. Part of the curriculum focus will provide co-operative education programs and sector certifications, helping students acquire essential knowledge and skills for direct entry into mining-related programs at University and College or mining-related Apprenticeships.

The Specialist High Skills Major in Health and Wellness provides opportunities for students to gain sector certifications as personal trainers, in first aid and CPR. Part of the curriculum focus will provide co-operative education programs helping students acquire essential knowledge and skills for direct entry into health-related programs at University and College or related Apprenticeships.

The Essentials Work Skills Program is a four-year program providing instruction for the student who has difficulties meeting the demands of the regular secondary school program. Programming is offered at the Essentials / Workplace levels. Students receive an Ontario Secondary School Diploma upon completion of year four. Students may choose destination opportunities in the Workplace.

The Transition Program is a four-year program that provides instruction for the student who has significant difficulties meeting the academic demands of the regular secondary school program. The emphasis of this program is on the transition to the workplace and the enhancement of independent living skills. Students receive a Certificate of Accomplishment upon completion of the four-year program.

Curricular and Co-Curricular Programs are designed to be challenging and flexible while providing meaningful instruction and experience to all participants. The school believes that the home and the community are essential for the total education and self-realization of every student. With them, the school shares the responsibility to develop excellence in each individual so far as his / her ability permits.

== Student life ==
Lively District Secondary School offers students a range of co-curricular opportunities including, sports, clubs, and social events. The LDSS Student Council is in charge of many events that go on in the school such as dances, fundraisers and pep rallies.

== Athletics ==
In 1999, the LDSS boys hockey team went from city champs to NOSSA tournament champs after defeating St.Mary's in the NOSSA finals. The boys went all the way to OFSAA before being defeated. This has been Lively Hockey's biggest victory in over 22 years.

In 2003–04, the Lively Boys Hockey Team went undefeated in both the regular season and playoffs.

In 2013–14, The Senior Boys Football Team won the city championships.

In 2014–15, The Junior Boys Football team won the city championships.

== Media ==
The School is home to the Shorties Film Festival, an annual festival that showcases the work of secondary and elementary students in Northern Ontario.

== See also ==
- Education in Ontario
- List of secondary schools in Ontario
