= Sudbury Secondary School =

High school in Sudbury, Ontario, Canada

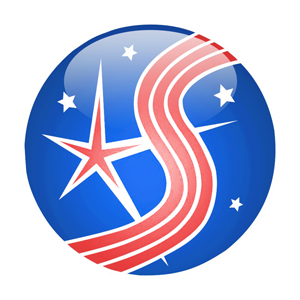

Location
- 154 College Street; Sudbury, Ontario, P3C 4Y2; Canada; 46°29′49″N 80°59′54″W

Information
- School board: Rainbow District School Board
- Website: sudsec.rainbowschools.ca

Sudbury Secondary School is a high school in the downtown of Greater Sudbury, Ontario, Canada, known for its arts education program, featuring theatre arts, dance, vocal music, instrumental music, keyboard, media arts and visual art. Sudbury Secondary School produces a mainstage musical each year (usually in the fall), as well as various other plays, concerts, art exhibits, and dance shows throughout the year. Sudbury Secondary School's F.W. Sheridan Auditorium also plays host to many performances by various organizations, groups, and out-of-town experiences. The school was created by combining the Sudbury High School (SHS) with Sheridan Technical School in 1974. Up until that time the two schools shared the same campus but operated independently with two different student streams and a strong rivalry. SHS students were all streamed in a 5 year program aimed at University enrollment. Most went on to University. In 1973 SHS students protested the plans to amalgamate the schools and walked out to no avail.

The school is overseen by the Rainbow District School Board. In December 2007, the School Board's Administrative Council recommended that the school undergo a renewal project. Items recommended for renewal: reducing excess space in the school; more parking for staff, students and visitors; that the guidance office be moved closer to the main office; that the school should become more environmentally friendly; potential movement of the arts departments so that they are closer to each other and to the auditorium, etc. There are also many alterations suggested for the Sheridan Auditorium, such as adding change rooms, and putting in new seats. It is Sudbury's historical high school, with many of its original components still intact. A large marble sign that was placed above the entrance to the first building can still be seen in the courtyard on the school's grounds. Now the school is opened with the new arts wing. Dedicated for all the art students.

== Arts Education ==
The school offers an Arts Education magnet program. Students who are in an arts program have one or more periods each day to develop skills in their field, whether it be dance, theatre arts, vocal music, instrumental music, keyboard, guitar, film or visual arts (fashion, photography, sculpting, etc.). Students are also required to complete the regular academic curriculum (Math, English, Science and French Immersion). Performing opportunities include the annual fall musical, recitals, festivals, and competitions.

== Centennial ==
In 2008, Sudbury Secondary School celebrated its 100th anniversary. A reunion was scheduled for the Civic Holiday weekend, with all former students invited to join. The school, located at 154 College Street, has housed several different educational institutions, including Sudbury Mining and Technical School, Sudbury High School, Sheridan Technical School and the current Sudbury Secondary School.

== Famous guests ==
During the 1970s Sudbury Secondary High School hosted several famous art personalities. These guest speakers gave information on their careers and life and generously answered questions to not only Sudbury Secondary High School students but to others who were bused in from neighbouring high schools for the events. They included such people as artist Alex Colville, and actress Yvonne De Carlo most famous at the time as TV's Lilly Munster.

== Mural ==
In August 2021, artist Kevin Ledo created a mural memorializing Alex Trebek, an alumnus of the school, on the school's back wall facing Mackenzie Street as part of the Up Here Festival.

== Notable alumni ==
Prominent alumni include:

- Robert Adetuyi, movie writer and director (Stomp the Yard)
- Alex Baumann, three-time Olympic gold medalist in swimming
- Joe Bowen, sports announcer for the Toronto Maple Leafs
- Pedro Costa, Music Producer
- Matthew Heiti, award-winning playwright and Genie-nominated screenwriter
- Tim Horton, hockey player and creator of Tim Horton's coffee chain
- David Mainse, televangelist
- Marianne Matichuk, former mayor of Greater Sudbury
- Bruce Mau, designer
- Karl Subban, writer and "hockey dad"
- Alex Trebek, former host of Jeopardy!
- Terry O'Reilly (broadcaster), advertiser and broadcaster

== See also ==
- Education in Ontario
- List of secondary schools in Ontario
