= Conseil scolaire catholique du Nouvel-Ontario =

School board in Ontario, Canada

Conseil scolaire de district catholique du Nouvel-Ontario
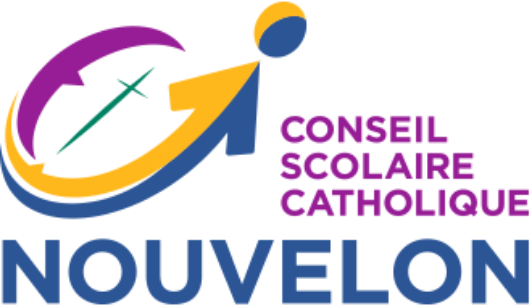

Location
- 201 Jogues Street; Subdury, Ontario, P3C 5L7 Canada

District information
- Established: January 22, 1998; 28 years ago
- President: Suzanne Salituri
- Vice-president: Marcel Montpellier
- Director of education: Tom Michaud
- Schools: 25 elementary schools 10 secondary schools
- Budget: CA$136,969,123 million
- District ID: B29122

Students and staff
- Students: 5,600

Other information
- Website: www.nouvelon.ca

The Conseil scolaire catholique du Nouvel-Ontario (also known as Conseil scolaire catholique Nouvelon and formerly known as French-language Separate District School Board No. 61 prior to 1999) is a school board in the Canadian province of Ontario. The board is the school district administrator for French language Roman Catholic separate schools in the city of Greater Sudbury and the districts of Sudbury, Manitoulin and Algoma.

The Board adopted its new identity as "Conseil scolaire catholique Nouvelon" in May 2019, while retaining its legal name as Conseil scolaire catholique du Nouvel-Ontario.

== Schools ==
=== Secondary ===
- Carrefour Options+ (Sudbury)
- École secondaire catholique Champlain (Chelmsford)
- École secondaire catholique Franco-Ouest (Espanola)
- École secondaire catholique l'Horizon (Val Caron)
- École secondaire catholique Jeunesse-Nord (Blind River)
- Collège Notre-Dame (Sudbury)
- École secondaire Notre-Dame-du-Sault (Sault Ste. Marie)
- École secondaire du Sacré-Cœur (Sudbury)
- École secondaire Saint-Joseph (Wawa)
- École secondaire catholique Trillium (Chapleau)

=== Elementary ===
- École catholique Alliance-St-Joseph (Chelmsford)
- École Félix-Ricard (Sudbury)
- École Georges-Vanier (Elliot Lake)
- École Jean-Paul II (Val Caron)
- École Notre-Dame-de-la-Merci (Coniston)
- École Notre-Dame-du-Sault (Sault Ste. Marie)
- École Notre-Place (Val Therese)
- École Sacré-Cœur (Chapleau)
- École St-Antoine (Noëlville)
- École St-Augustin (Garson)
- École St-Charles Borromée (St. Charles)
- École St-Denis (Sudbury)
- École St-Dominique (Sudbury)
- École St-Étienne (Dowling)
- École Saint-Joseph, (Blind River)
- École St-Joseph (Sudbury)
- École St-Joseph (Dubreuilville)
- École Saint-Joseph (Espanola)
- École Saint-Joseph (Wawa)
- École St-Paul (Lively)
- École St-Pierre (Sudbury)
- École St-Thomas (Warren)
- École Saint Nom de Jésus (Hornepayne)
- École Sainte-Anne (Spanish)
- École Ste-Marie (Azilda)

=== Trustees ===
The CSCNO has 12 elected trustees and two student trustees. The Chair of the Board is , and the Vice Chair is .

2026-2030 Board of Trustees
Zone	Trustee	Note
1	Paul Gervais	
2	Suzanne Salituri	
3	Luc Tessier	
4	Sydney Corriveau	
4	Louise M. Dube	
5	Monique Aubin-Gagne	
5	Josee Bisson	
5	Stephane Clement	
6	Marcel Legault	
6	Yanick Proulx	
7	Lyse-Anne Papineau	Lyse-Anne Papineau served as Director of Education from 2008 until 2020
8	Roger Lemoyne	

=== Director of Education ===
The current Director of Education has been Tom Michaud since January 6, 2025.

==== Former directors ====
- Paul Henry (2020-2025)
- Lyse-Anne Papineau (2008-2020)
- Hélène Chayer (1998-2008)

== See also ==
- List of school districts in Ontario
- List of high schools in Ontario
