= Rainbow District School Board =

School board in Ontario, Canada

Location
- 408 Wembley Dr, Sudbury, ON P3E 1P2 Canada
- Coordinates: 46°29′29″N 80°59′28″W

District information
- Chair of the board: David Farrow
- Director of education: Bruce Bourget
- Schools: 38 Total (9 Secondary, 29 Elementary)

Students and staff
- Students: 14,383

Other information
- Elected trustees: David Farrow, Alex McCauley, Bob Clement, Lisa Corbiere-Addison, Linda Debassige, Doreen Dewar, Anita Gibson, Judy Hunda and Judy Kosmerly
- Website: www.rainbowschools.ca

Rainbow District School Board (known as English-language Public District School Board No. 3 prior to 1999) covers a geographic area of more than 14,757 square kilometres (5,698 sq mi) in the heart of the Rainbow Country and is the largest public school board in Northern Ontario. The Board offers English language and French Immersion program to students from Kindergarten to Grade 12.

Rainbow District School Board is the largest school board in Northern Ontario with 29 elementary school buildings and 9 secondary school buildings in Sudbury, Espanola and Manitoulin.

The Board also offers other programs - Child and Adolescent Mental Health Program, Cecil Facer School, N’Swakamok Native Friendship Centre, Children's Treatment Centre, O’Connor Park, Applied Behaviour Analysis program, Restart, Simulated Healthy Independent Living Opportunities (SHILO) program, Attendance Centre, Mishko-Ode-Wendam, Northern Support Initiative, Frank Flowers School and Barrydowne College operating at Cambrian College.

Notable Alumni: Shania Twain

== List of elementary schools ==
- A.B. Ellis Public School
- Adamsdale Public School
- Alexander Public School
- Algonquin Road Public School
- Assiginack Public School
- Central Manitoulin Public School
- Charles C. McLean Public School
- Churchill Public School
- Copper Cliff Public School
- C.R. Judd Public School
- Jean Hanson Public School
- Lansdowne Public School
- Larchwood Public School
- Lasalle Elementary School
- Levack Public School
- Little Current Public School
- MacLeod Public School
- Markstay Public School
- Monetville Public School
- Northeastern Elementary School
- Princess Anne Public School
- Queen Elizabeth II Public School
- Redwood Acres Public School
- R.H. Murray Public School
- R.L. Beattie Public School
- S. Geiger Public School
- Valley View Public School
- Walden Public School
- Westmount Avenue Public School

== List of secondary schools ==
- Barrydowne College, Sudbury
- Chelmsford Valley District Composite School, Chelmsford
- Confederation Secondary School, Valley East
- Espanola High School, Espanola
- Lasalle Secondary School, Sudbury
- Lively District Secondary School, Lively
- Lockerby Composite School, Sudbury
- Lo-Ellen Park Secondary School, Sudbury
- Manitoulin Secondary School, M'Chigeeng
- Sudbury Secondary School, Sudbury

== See also ==
- List of school districts in Ontario
- List of high schools in Ontario
