= 2014 Greater Sudbury municipal election =

Canadian municipal election

- October 27, 2014
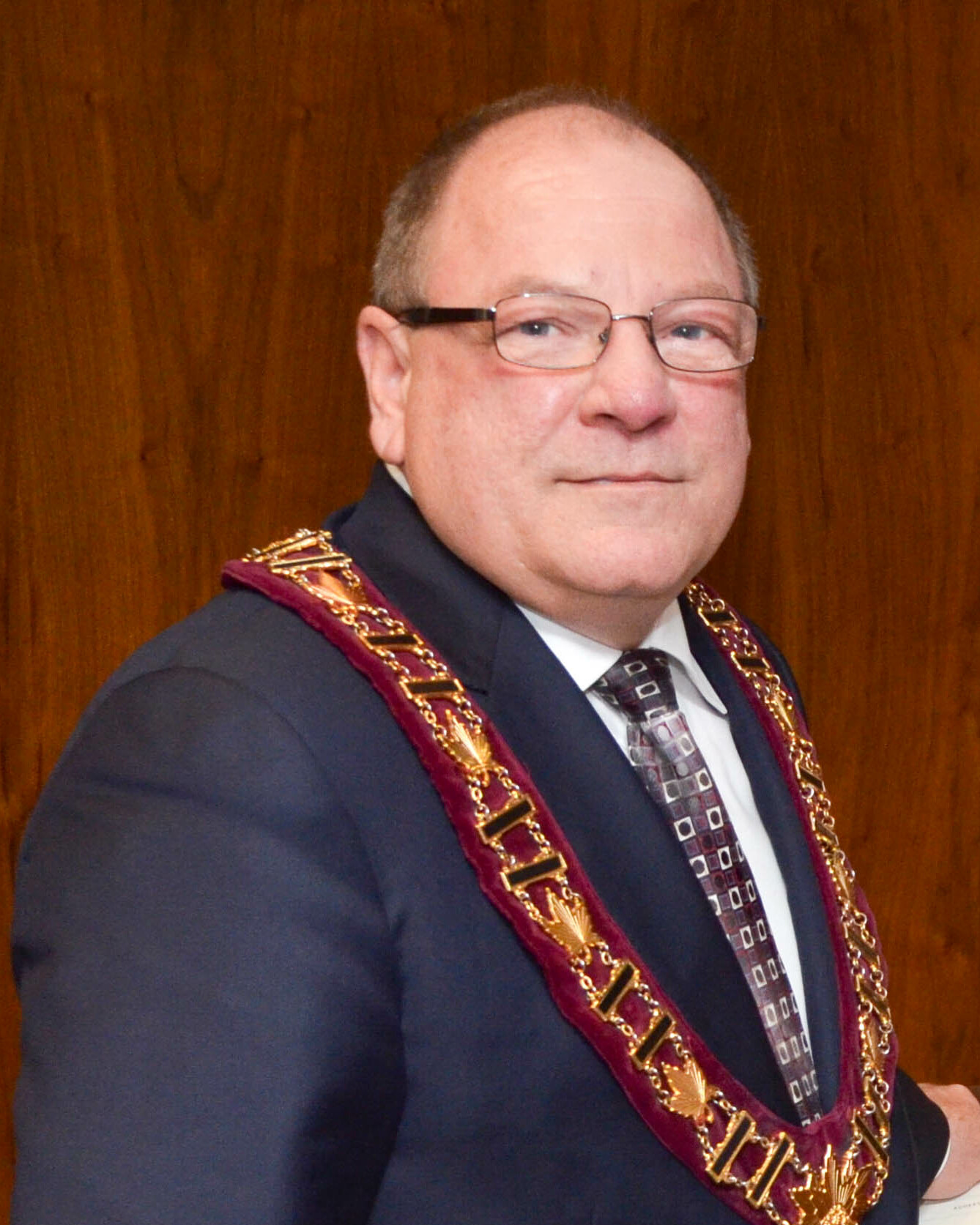

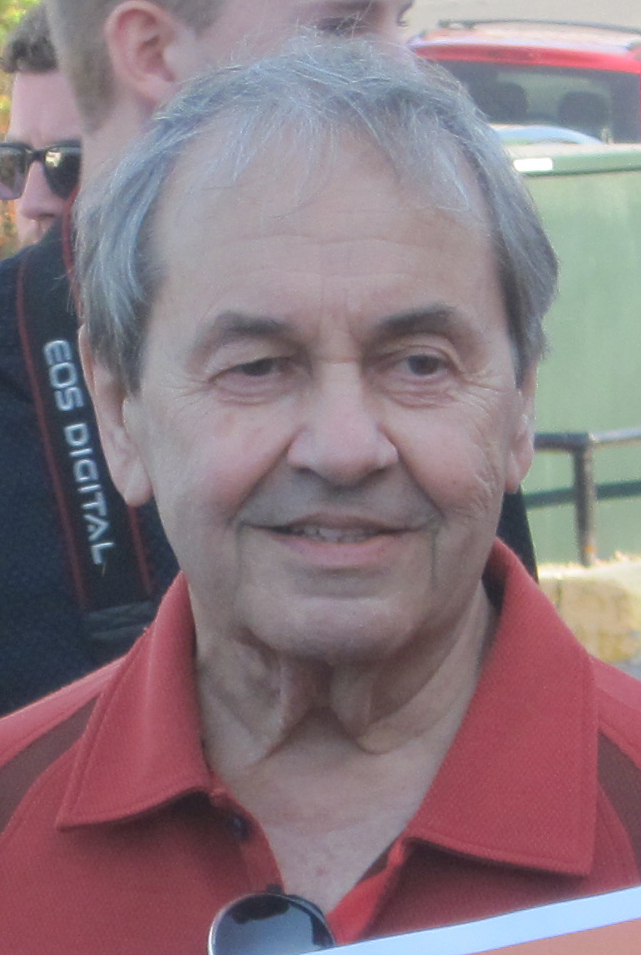
		DM
Candidate	Brian Bigger	Dan Melanson
Popular vote	27,303	11,345
Percentage	46.32%	19.25%
		RD
Candidate	John Rodriguez	Ron Dupuis
Popular vote	10,243	5,176
Percentage	17.38%	8.78%
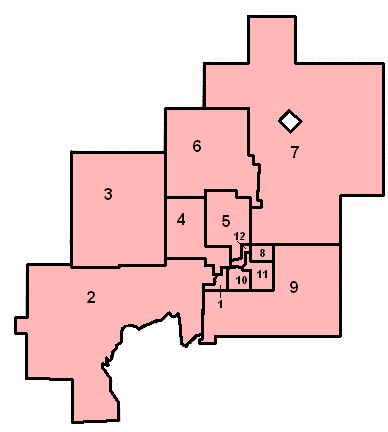
- Ward boundaries of the City of Greater Sudbury
Mayor before election
Marianne Matichuk
Elected Mayor
Brian Bigger

The 2014 Greater Sudbury municipal election was held on October 27, 2014 to elect a mayor and 12 city councillors in Greater Sudbury, Ontario. In addition, school trustees were elected to the Rainbow District School Board, Sudbury Catholic District School Board, Conseil scolaire de district du Grand Nord de l'Ontario and Conseil scolaire de district catholique du Nouvel-Ontario.

The election was held in conjunction with those held in other municipalities in the province of Ontario. For other elections, see 2014 Ontario municipal elections.

Candidate registration opened on January 2, 2014. The last day for candidate registration was September 12, 2014; although the offices of mayor and all twelve city council seats saw contested elections, some candidates for election to the school boards were declared acclaimed to office on that date as no opposing candidates registered by the deadline.

For the first time in the city's history, the 2014 election included an online voting option as part of efforts to increase voter turnout.

== Issues ==
The predominant election issue was the functioning of Greater Sudbury City Council in the 2010-14 term. Under mayor Marianne Matichuk, who was widely criticized as lacking the leadership skills necessary to build a working coalition of support for her agenda, the council's work frequently bogged down in a state of political gridlock.

In addition, the council faced extensive criticism for its 2013 decision to refuse oversight from the Ontario Ombudsman's office, as well as the management of community development funds, disbursed by city councillors, which have been widely criticized as having the potential to be misused as political slush funds.

In conjunction with the election, a municipal referendum was held on the issue of deregulating retail store hours in Greater Sudbury, which was one of the few cities in Ontario where retail stores were still not permitted to open on Boxing Day. Matichuk had pledged to deregulate store hours in the 2010 election, although her motion to do so failed when she presented it to council on February 9, 2011; the referendum was approved by council in September 2012.

A poll conducted by Oraclepoll Research for the city's Northern Life newspaper found that despite the transparency and government effectiveness issues that had dominated the municipal political scene over the previous term, basic pocketbook issues such as road maintenance and property taxes were most commonly identified by voters as their main priorities in the election, with integrity and ethics ranking as the top priority for only a small minority of voters.

== Mayoral race ==
In the early months of the campaign, Matichuk's silence about her reelection plans gave rise to media speculation that Premier Kathleen Wynne planned to appoint Matichuk as the Ontario Liberal Party's candidate in the provincial electoral district of Sudbury for the 2014 provincial election. Both Wynne and Matichuk denied the reports; however, the speculation failed to die down because of Matichuk's continued lack of clarity about her plans, and the local Liberal riding association's inability to get a firm date commitment for its nomination meeting from the party's head office. The party finally nominated Andrew Olivier as its candidate on May 8. In addition, virtually all of the major figures from Matichuk's 2010 campaign team publicly declared that they would not participate in a 2014 campaign on her behalf.

Matichuk announced on June 19 that she would not run for a second term as mayor. Despite the controversies that marred her first term in office, however, Oraclepoll Research's first poll of the race, released on June 24, 2014, suggested that she still held a healthy lead over any of the declared candidates among decided voters, with 38.1 per cent support.

Former mayor John Rodriguez, who was defeated by Matichuk in the 2010 election, registered as a candidate for mayor on May 9. The other declared candidates were Jean-Raymond Audet; Jeanne Brohart; Brian Bigger, who took leave from his job as the city's auditor to mount his campaign; Ron Dupuis, the incumbent city councillor for Ward 5 (Valley East); Jeff Huska, a biomedical engineering technologist at Health Sciences North; Richard Majkot, a retired former staffer at Toronto City Hall; Dan Melanson, the former president of a local taxpayers' lobby association who was himself an advisor to Matichuk's campaign in 2010; and Ed Pokonzie and David Popescu, both perennial candidates in the Sudbury area.

=== Opinion polls ===
Percentages of decided vote.

Polling firm	Last date of polling	Bigger	Dupuis	Huska	Melanson	Rodriguez	Others	Don't know/ Wouldn't vote	Poll commissioned by	Reference
Oraclepoll Research	October 22, 2014	31	16	5	23	21	4	34.1	Northern Life	
Oraclepoll Research	October 16, 2014	34.9	15.1	4.7	24.7	19.8	3.8	38.7	Northern Life	
PrimeContact	October 10, 2014	44.7	7.1	7.1	15.3	17.6	8.2	15	Prime Contact	
Oraclepoll Research	September 26, 2014	33.2	9.6	6.4	23.7	22.3	4.8	25	Northern Life	
Oraclepoll Research	September 19, 2014	31.1	13	6.4	22.5	26.5	0.5	30.4	CJTK-FM	

=== Election results ===
Candidate	Votes	%
Brian Bigger	27,303	46.32
Dan Melanson	11,345	19.25
John Rodriguez	10,243	17.38
Ron Dupuis	5,176	8.78
Jeff Huska	2,584	4.38
Richard Majkot	1,412	2.40
Jeanne Brohart	494	0.84
Jean-Raymond Audet	256	0.43
David Popescu	67	0.11
Ed Pokonzie	65	0.11
Total valid votes	58,945	100.0

== Referendum ==
In conjunction with the municipal election, three referendum questions on store hours in the city were posed to voters.

The referendum results were not legally binding on the city, as participation on all three questions fell slightly short of 50 per cent of registered voters; although the overall election passed 50 per cent voter turnout, the referendum questions garnered only 47 per cent participation. Some voters who were opposed to the proposal reportedly opted to abstain from the referendum questions, out of the mistaken perception that rather than bouncing the issue back to city council again, a failure to achieve 50 per cent turnout would make it legally impossible for any change in store hours to take place at all.

Mayor-elect Brian Bigger and several of the new councillors stated that they considered the result to be a sufficient mandate to proceed with deregulation of store hours, and the city's store hours bylaw was repealed at the new council's first official business meeting on December 9, 2014.

=== Question 1 ===
Are you in favour of retail business establishments having the choice to open to the public on December 26?

Response	Votes	%
Yes	34,312	61.12
No	21,826	38.88

=== Question 2 ===
Are you in favour of retail business establishments having the choice to open to the public on the Civic Holiday, the first Monday in August?

Response	Votes	%
Yes	34,894	62.38
No	21,047	37.62

=== Question 3 ===
Are you in favour of allowing retail business establishments to choose the hours when they are open to the public?

Response	Votes	%
Yes	42,511	75.46
No	13,826	24.54

== Council ==
=== Ward 1 ===
Ward 1 was an open seat, as former councillor Joe Cimino was elected to the Legislative Assembly of Ontario in the 2014 provincial election.

Candidate	Votes	%
Mark Signoretti	1,780	39.67
Chris Spry	1,125	25.07
Matt Alexander	589	13.13
Paul Soucie	274	6.11
Thomas Trainor	261	5.82
Denis Ferron	232	5.17
Mathieu Labonté	167	3.72
Sidney Shapiro	59	1.31
Total valid votes		

=== Ward 2 ===
Candidate	Votes	%
Michael Vagnini	2,752	49.36
(incumbent) Jacques Barbeau	2,190	39.28
Daniel Xilon	398	7.14
Chad Odnokon	152	2.73
Joseph Palmateer	83	1.49
Total valid votes		

=== Ward 3 ===
Ward 3 was an open seat after Claude Berthiaume announced his retirement from politics.

Candidate	Votes	%
Gerry Montpellier	1,884	42.14
Marcel Montpellier	1,311	29.32
Matt Belanger	960	21.47
Jesse Gaudet	316	7.07
Total valid votes	4,471	100%

=== Ward 4 ===
Candidate	Votes	%
(incumbent) Evelyn Dutrisac	2,112	48.10
François Couture	1,713	39.01
Paul Lefebvre	566	12.89
Total valid votes		

Richard Paquette was a registered candidate, but withdrew his candidacy for personal reasons in April.

=== Ward 5 ===
Ward 5 was an open seat, as incumbent councillor Ron Dupuis was a candidate in the mayoral race.

Candidate	Votes	%
Robert Kirwan	1,467	35.78
John Lundrigan	969	23.63
Richard Larcher	891	21.73
Joseph Berthelot	483	11.78
Kent MacNeill	290	7.07
Total valid votes		

=== Ward 6 ===
Candidate	Votes	%
René Lapierre	1,933	37.56
(incumbent) André Rivest	1,663	32.31
Fernand Bidal	865	16.81
Kevin Brault	686	13.33
Total valid votes		

=== Ward 7 ===
Candidate	Votes	%
Mike Jakubo	2,486	50.90
(incumbent) Dave Kilgour	1,525	31.22
Robin Auger	414	8.48
Gordon Drysdale	371	7.60
Walter Prus	88	1.80
Total valid votes		

Frank Mazzuca, Jr. was a registered candidate, but withdrew on May 22, 2014.

=== Ward 8 ===
Candidate	Votes	%
(incumbent) Al Sizer	1,973	45.04
Stefano Presenza	1,042	23.78
Michael Cullen	1,013	23.12
Gerry Perras	219	5.00
Kerry Latham	134	3.06
Total valid votes		

=== Ward 9 ===
Candidate	Votes	%
Deb McIntosh	2,000	35.28
Les Lisk	1,037	18.29
Wyman MacKinnon	691	12.19
Lin Gibson	679	11.98
Paul Stopciati	657	11.59
Aaron Beaudry	353	6.23
Will Thomson	252	4.45
Total valid votes		

=== Ward 10 ===
Candidate	Votes	%
Fern Cormier	2,085	38.84
John Antonioni	1,200	22.35
Hannu Piironen	1,042	19.41
Mila Wong	794	14.79
Steve Ripley	247	4.60
Total valid votes		

=== Ward 11 ===
Candidate	Votes	%
Lynne Reynolds	2,194	40.86
(incumbent) Terry Kett	1,700	31.73
Mike Bleskie	851	15.89
Chris Nerpin	356	6.65
Vincent Lacroix	256	4.78
Total valid votes		

=== Ward 12 ===
Candidate	Votes	%
(incumbent) Joscelyne Landry-Altmann	2,179	52.98
Tay Butt	1,136	27.62
Shawn Ouimet	498	12.06
Robert McCarthy	302	7.34
Total valid votes		

== Rainbow District School Board ==
=== Zone 1 ===
Zone 1 consists of Wards 1 and 2 in the city.

Candidate	Votes	%
(incumbent) Gord Santala	2,483	42.58
Jennifer Michaud	1,477	25.33
John Hamalainen	982	16.84
Frank DeBurger	890	15.26
Total valid votes		

=== Zone 2 ===
Zone 2 consists of Wards 3 and 4 in the city, as well as much of the Unorganized North Sudbury District north of the city, including the townships of Cartier, Cascaden, Foy, Hart, Harty, Hess, Moncrieff, Shining Tree and Trill.

Candidate	Votes	%
(incumbent) Tyler Campbell	1,711	57.49
Anita Gibson	1,265	42.51
Total valid votes		

=== Zone 3 ===
Zone 3 consists of Wards 5 and 6 in the city.

Candidate	Votes	%
Judy Kosmerly	acclaimed	

=== Zone 4 ===
Zone 4 consists of Wards 7 and 8 in the city, as well as the outlying municipalities of French River, Killarney, Markstay-Warren and St. Charles, and the unorganized townships of Burwash, Cox, Davis, Eden, Hawley, Hendrie, Henry, James, Laura, Loughrin, Secord, Servos, Street and Tilton.

Candidate	Votes	%
(incumbent) Dena Morrison	acclaimed	

=== Zone 5 ===
Zone 5 consists of Wards 9 and 10 in the city.

Candidate	Votes	%
(incumbent) Doreen Dewar	3,404	59.67
Jessica Joy	1,248	21.88
Dylan Gibson	1,053	18.46
Total valid votes		

=== Zone 6 ===
Zone 6 consists of Wards 11 and 12 in the city.

Candidate	Votes	%
(incumbent) Judy Hunda	acclaimed	

== Sudbury Catholic District School Board ==
=== Zone 1 ===
Zone 1 consists of Wards 1 and 2 in the city.

Candidate	Votes	%
(incumbent) Estelle Scappatura	1,197	54.21
Clara Steele	1,011	45.79
Total valid votes		

=== Zone 2 ===
Zone 2 consists of Wards 3 and 4 in the city, as well as much of the Unorganized North Sudbury District north of the city, including the townships of Cartier, Cascaden, Foy, Hart, Harty, Hess, Moncrieff, Shining Tree and Trill.

Candidate	Votes	%
(incumbent) Raymond Desjardins	acclaimed	

=== Zone 3 ===
Zone 3 consists of Wards 5 and 6 in the city.

Candidate	Votes	%
(incumbent) Michael Bellmore	acclaimed	

=== Zone 4 ===
Zone 4 consists of Wards 7 and 8 in the city, as well as the outlying municipalities of Markstay-Warren and St. Charles.

Candidate	Votes	%
Nancy Deni	1,241	53.38
(incumbent) Barry MacDonald	1,084	46.62
Total valid votes		

=== Zone 5 ===
Zone 5 consists of Wards 9 and 10 in the city, as well as the outlying municipalities of French River and Killarney, and the unorganized townships of Burwash, Cox, Davis, Eden, Hawley, Henvey, Hendrie, Henry, James, Laura, Loughrin, Secord, Servos, Street, Tilton and Wallbridge.

Candidate	Votes	%
Tyler Peroni	1,477	52.38
Geraldine Meskell	1,343	47.62
Total valid votes		

=== Zone 6 ===
Zone 6 consists of Wards 11 and 12 in the city.

Candidate	Votes	%
(incumbent) Jody Cameron	acclaimed	

Cameron was subsequently removed from office on March 30, 2015, after failing to file his financial statements from the 2014 election by the filing deadline of March 27; even though Cameron had been acclaimed to his seat and thus had no campaign expenses to report, he was still legally required to file a statement formally declaring his lack of expenses. Calling the matter an accidental oversight, Cameron appealed the decision and was reinstated as trustee and board chair in April.

== Conseil scolaire public du Grand Nord de l'Ontario ==
=== Zone 7 ===
Candidate	Votes	%
Lynn Despatie	281	67.06
Françoise Monette	138	32.94
Total valid votes		

=== Zone 8 ===
Candidate	Votes	%
Robert Boileau	acclaimed	

=== Zone 9 ===
Candidate	Votes	%
Claude Giroux	acclaimed	

=== Zone 10 ===
Candidate	Votes	%
Jean-Marc Aubin	acclaimed	

=== Zone 11 ===
Candidate	Votes	%
Raymond Labrecque	acclaimed	

=== Zone 12 ===
Candidate	Votes	%
François Boudreau	acclaimed	

== Conseil scolaire de district catholique du Nouvel-Ontario ==
=== Zone 4 ===
Two to be elected.

Candidate	Votes	%
Paul Demers	1,955	40.54
Louise Dubé	1,702	35.30
Paul Marleau	1,165	24.16
Total valid votes		

=== Zone 5 ===
Two to be elected.

Candidate	Votes	%
André Bidal	2,728	33.83
Marc Larochelle	2,193	27.19
Normand Courtemanche	1,906	23.63
Pierre Beaumier	1,238	15.35
Total valid votes		

=== Zone 6 ===
Two to be elected.

Candidate	Votes	%
Louise Essiembre	acclaimed	
Marcel Legault	acclaimed	
Total valid votes		
