= 2010 Greater Sudbury municipal election =

Canadian municipal election

- October 25, 2010
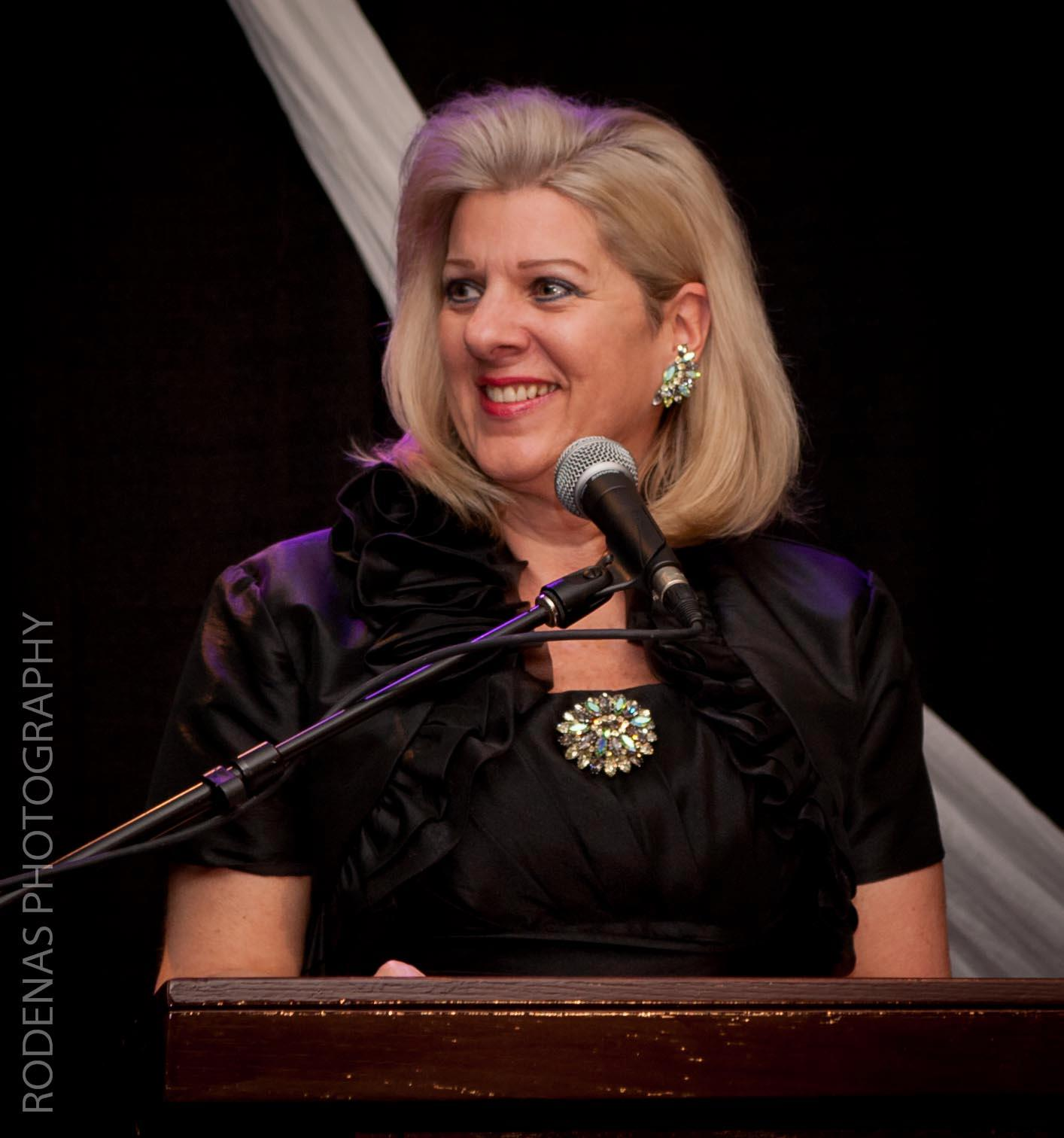

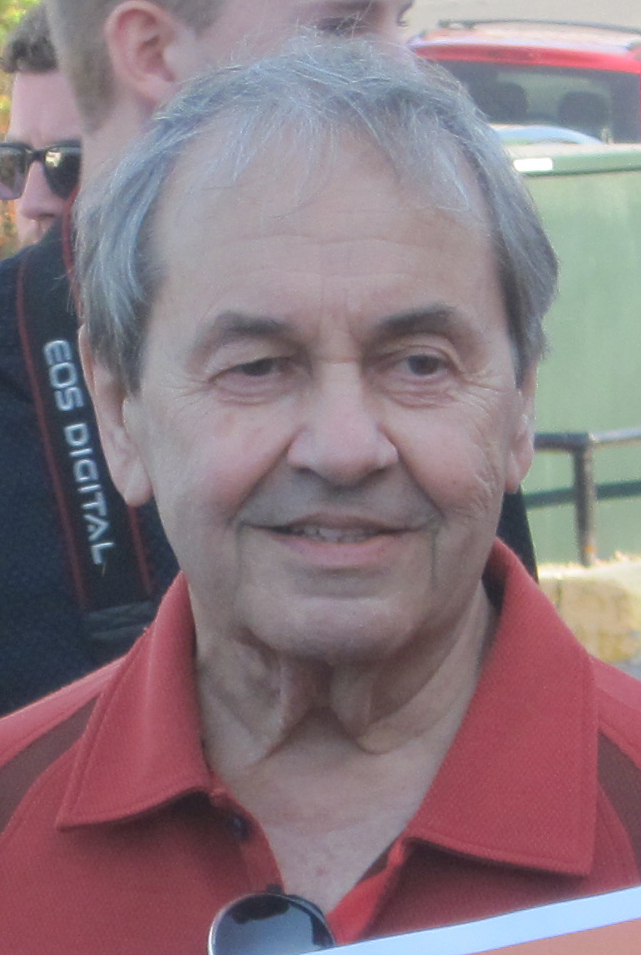
			TC
Candidate	Marianne Matichuk	John Rodriguez	Ted Callaghan
Popular vote	25,042	19,819	7,298
Percentage	46.1%	36.5%	13.4%
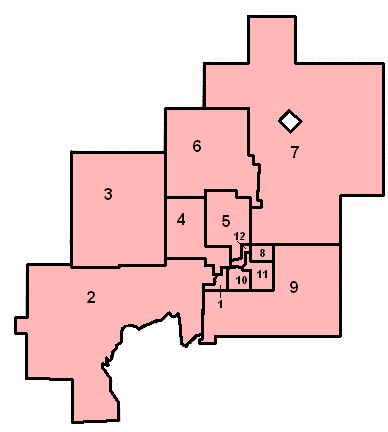
- Ward boundaries of the City of Greater Sudbury
Mayor before election
John Rodriguez
Elected Mayor
Marianne Matichuk

The 2010 Greater Sudbury municipal election was held on October 25, 2010 to elect a mayor and 12 city councillors in Greater Sudbury, Ontario. In addition, school trustees were elected to the Rainbow District School Board, Sudbury Catholic District School Board, Conseil scolaire de district du Grand Nord de l'Ontario and Conseil scolaire de district catholique du Nouvel-Ontario.

The election was held in conjunction with those held in other municipalities in the province of Ontario. For other elections, see 2010 Ontario municipal elections.

Candidate registration opened on January 4, 2010. Six candidates, including three incumbents and three challengers, submitted their nomination papers in the first week. The final registration deadline for candidates was September 10, 2010.

== Issues ==
One of the dominant issues in the election campaign was the status of the city's St. Joseph's Hospital. With the completion of the new Sudbury Regional Hospital facility, the closure of the St. Joseph's site was imminent — however, despite the city's longtime interest in acquiring the property due to its adjacency to Bell Park and Lake Ramsey, the Sisters of St. Joseph sold the site in 2010 to Panoramic Properties, a condominium developer from Niagara Falls. The campaign was subsequently marked by conflicting claims about how much notice the Sisters gave to city council, and how much time and money the city did or didn't have to prepare a counteroffer for the site; a community group, Save Bell Park, formed to lobby for the site's protection.

Less dramatically, most voters identified road maintenance and property taxes as their other key priorities in the election. For the first time since the 2000 election, notably, the municipal amalgamation of the Regional Municipality of Sudbury into the current city of Greater Sudbury, which took place in 2000, did not register as a prominent election issue.

The issue of retail store hours in the city also became an election issue when Marianne Matichuk supported allowing businesses to set their own hours without regulation from the city. If passed, this would include allowing stores in the city to open on Boxing Day for the first time; with labour unions being a prominent political force in the city, the issue of balancing the rights of retailers to set business hours against the rights of workers to holiday time at Christmas has been a persistent debate in Sudbury's municipal politics.

The mayoral candidacy of David Popescu, a perennial candidate in the Sudbury area who was convicted of hate speech after advocating the execution of homosexuals in the 2008 federal election campaign, also emerged as a minor issue when he was permitted to participate in a mayoral debate sponsored by the Greater Sudbury Chamber of Commerce. Marianne Matichuk publicly criticized the Chamber of Commerce for not excluding Popescu from the debate, while candidate Derek Young called Matichuk's move a populist ploy that would both undermine the democratic process and distract from other issues in the debate, and the Chamber of Commerce reiterated that its standing policy when sponsoring political debates was to invite all registered candidates regardless of their personal views. Popescu had already participated in other mayoral debates during the 2010 election campaign without incident, and none of the candidates for mayor, including Matichuk, opted to boycott the Chamber of Commerce debate over Popescu's inclusion.

On the final Friday of the election campaign, the Sudbury Star endorsed Matichuk for the mayor's chair. The following day, the paper published an article headlined "City misled public about manager's dismissal", alleging that Rodriguez and the incumbent council had deliberately lied to the public about the resignation of Alan Stephen, the former manager of the city's infrastructure and emergency services division, in 2006; however, the incident described in the article was one in which the city appeared to simply have followed its legal obligation to maintain confidentiality around matters involving employee relations. The newspaper subsequently faced criticism for its portrayal of the story and for publishing the story only after it would be too late for Rodriguez or any other member of the city's staff to respond ahead of election day; in an interview on CBC Northern Ontario's Points North following the election, Sudbury Star managing editor Brian MacLeod stated that the paper had received the information in an anonymous brown envelope several days before the story went to print. The Ontario Provincial Police subsequently announced that they were conducting an investigation into the leak.

== Polling ==
Although incumbent mayor John Rodriguez faced significant criticism of his first term as mayor, an Oraclepoll Research survey released on October 13, 2010, twelve days before the election, suggested that he remained in the lead with 41.6 per cent of decided voters; however, this represented a drop of 10.2 per cent from his winning margin in the 2006 election. Matichuk, a political neophyte who was virtually unknown before announcing her campaign in early September, was in second place with 31.5 per cent support, while councillor Ted Callaghan had 22.7 per cent support. All of the other candidates combined had a total of 4.1 per cent support; notably, the poll did not register a single decided voter for either Popescu or Ed Pokonzie.

A subsequent CTV Northern Ontario poll, released in the final week of the campaign, showed significant tightening of the race, with 32 per cent support for Rodriguez, 28 per cent for Matichuk and 18 per cent for Callaghan, with 21 per cent undecided.

== Council results ==
Although Rodriguez and incumbent councillor Ted Callaghan were defeated for the mayoralty, all incumbent councillors who ran for council seats were re-elected. Of the three open seats on city council, only one was won by a political newcomer; the other two were won by former mayors of two of the city's pre-amalgamation suburbs.

=== Mayor ===
Candidate	Votes	%
Marianne Matichuk	25,042	46.1
(incumbent) John Rodriguez	19,819	36.5
Ted Callaghan	7,298	13.4
Derek Young	1,432	2.6
Zack Gauthier	390	0.7
Dennis Gorman	167	0.3
Ed Pokonzie	102	0.2
David Popescu	96	0.2
Total valid votes	54,346	

EastLink manager Marc Serré, the son of former federal Member of Parliament Gaetan Serré, also filed nomination papers, but withdrew from the mayoral race in the final week of nominations.

=== Ward 1 ===
Incumbent councillor Joe Cimino was one of two councillors who had no opposing candidates file by the close of nominations on September 10.

=== Ward 2 ===
Candidate	Votes	%
(incumbent) Jacques Barbeau	3,689	75.2
Peter Albers	1,216	24.8
Total valid votes	4,905	

=== Ward 3 ===
Candidate	Votes	%
(incumbent) Claude Berthiaume	3,019	69.8
Andrew Fahey	1,133	26.2
Rickey Goudreau	175	4.0
Total valid votes	4,327	

=== Ward 4 ===
Candidate	Votes	%
(incumbent) Evelyn Dutrisac	2,614	63.9
Richard Paquette	1,479	36.1
Total valid votes	4,093	

=== Ward 5 ===
Incumbent councillor Ron Dupuis was one of two councillors who had no opposing candidates file by the close of nominations on September 10.

=== Ward 6 ===
Candidate	Votes	%
(incumbent) André Rivest	2,400	53.3
Pete Chénier	1,598	35.5
Christine Guillot-Proulx	504	11.2
Total valid votes	4,502	

=== Ward 7 ===
Incumbent councillor Russ Thompson did not seek re-election. The winning candidate, Dave Kilgour, is a former mayor of Capreol.

Candidate	Votes	%
Dave Kilgour	2,078	51.5
Gordon Drysdale	1,181	29.3
Dave Della Vedova	775	19.2
Total valid votes	4,034	

=== Ward 8 ===
Incumbent councillor Ted Callaghan ran for the mayoralty.

Candidate	Votes	%
Fabio Belli	1,991	44.8
Al Sizer	921	20.7
Lorenzo Tripodi	662	14.9
Ron LaPlante	281	6.3
Leo Bisson	259	5.8
Ian McCracken	155	3.5
Louis Delongchamp	72	1.6
Harry Will	71	1.6
Alex Martinez	34	0.8
Total valid votes	4,446	

=== Ward 9 ===
Candidate	Votes	%
(incumbent) Doug Craig	1,879	38.9
Jim Sartor	1,501	31.1
Paul Stopciati	1,447	30.0
Total valid votes	4,827	

=== Ward 10 ===
Incumbent councillor Frances Caldarelli was re-elected by just five votes over challenger Fern Cormier, in a race with 175 rejected ballots. Cormier asked for a recount, a position which Caldarelli also endorsed; however, Cormier subsequently withdrew his request after learning that the province's municipal elections law requires recounts to be conducted by the same process as the original count, and does not allow for manual inspection of ballots that were rejected by the voting machines.

Candidate	Votes	%
(incumbent) Frances Caldarelli	2,151	40.6
Fern Cormier	2,146	40.5
Mark Signoretti	682	12.9
Steve Ripley	316	6.0
Total valid votes	5,295	

Former city councillor Mila Wong also registered as a candidate, but withdrew from the race.

=== Ward 11 ===
Incumbent councillor Janet Gasparini did not run for re-election. The winning candidate, Terry Kett, is a former mayor of Walden.

Candidate	Votes	%
Terry Kett	1,971	39.2
Tom Fenske	1,510	30.0
Mike Petryna	796	15.8
Gerry Paquette	512	10.2
Joe Vairo	239	4.8
Total valid votes	5,028	

=== Ward 12 ===
Candidate	Votes	%
(incumbent) Joscelyne Landry-Altmann	2,844	71.2
Jeff MacIntyre	1,148	28.8
Total valid votes	3,992	

== Rainbow District School Board results ==
=== Wards 1/2 ===
Candidate	Votes	%
Gord Santala	3,530	66.25
Jenny Lyn Albers	1,798	33.75
Total valid votes	5,328	

=== Wards 3/4 ===
Candidate	Votes	%
Tyler Campbell	1,705	55.92
Lisa Sagle	1,344	44.08
Total valid votes	3,049	

=== Wards 5/6 ===
Candidate	Votes	%
Robert Kirwan	1,423	53.88
Ruth Ward	642	24.31
Gordon Ewin	576	21.81
Total valid votes	2,641	

=== Wards 7/8 ===
Candidate	Votes	%
Dena Morrison	3,404	58.49
Lee Ferguson	1,614	27.73
Silvio Vitiello	802	13.78
Total valid votes	5,820	

=== Wards 9/10 ===
Candidate	Votes	%
Doreen Dewar	4,107	73.01
Lionel Rudd	1,518	26.99
Total valid votes	5,625	

=== Wards 11/12 ===
Candidate	Votes	%
Judy Hunda	2,258	62.24
John Cochrane	1,370	37.76
Total valid votes	3,628	

== Sudbury Catholic District School Board results ==
=== Wards 1/2 ===
Candidate	Votes	%
Estelle Scappatura	1,499	56.57
Ray Vincent	1,151	4,343
Total valid votes	2,650	

=== Wards 3/4 ===
Candidate	Votes	%
Raymond Desjardins	395	28.90
Felicia Fahey	357	26.12
Leslie Marie Steel	247	18.07
Jack McDonald	235	17.19
David Stapleton	133	9.73
Total valid votes	1,367	

=== Wards 5/6 ===
Candidate	Votes	%
Michael Bellmore	955	65.41
Geraldine Meskell	505	34.59
Total valid votes	1,460	

=== Wards 7/8 ===
Candidate	Votes	%
Barry MacDonald	1,772	72.71
John Leonard	665	27.29
Total valid votes	2,437	

=== Wards 9/10 ===
Candidate	Votes	%
Paula Peroni	1,816	60.31
Michelle Watkins	1,195	39.69
Total valid votes	3,011	

=== Wards 11/12 ===
Candidate	Votes	%
Jody Cameron	Acclaimed	

== Conseil scolaire de district du Grand Nord de l'Ontario results ==
=== Wards 1/4 ===
Candidate	Votes	%
Françoise Monette	Acclaimed	

=== Wards 2/3 ===
Candidate	Votes	%
Robert Boileau	132	51.16
François Boudreau	126	48.84
Total valid votes	258	

=== Wards 5/7 ===
Candidate	Votes	%
Claude Giroux	285	78.30
Gilles Crépeau	79	21.70
Total valid votes	364	

=== Ward 6 ===
Candidate	Votes	%
Jean-Marc Aubin	Acclaimed	

=== Wards 8/12 ===
Candidate	Votes	%
Raymond Labrecque	Acclaimed	

=== Wards 9/10/11 ===
Candidate	Votes	%
Anik Charron	472	83.54
Moustapha Soumahoro	93	16.46
Total valid votes	565	

== Conseil scolaire de district catholique du Nouvel-Ontario results ==
=== Wards 1-4 ===
Two candidates to be elected.

Candidate	Votes	%
Paul Demers	Acclaimed	
Marcel Montpellier	Acclaimed	

=== Wards 5-6 ===
Two candidates to be elected.

Candidate	Votes	%
Georges Boudreau	1,913	36.90
Jean-Yves (John) Robert	1,384	26.70
Marcel Legault	1,262	24.34
Fernand Bidal	625	12.06
Total valid votes	5,184	

=== Wards 7-12 ===
Three candidates to be elected.

Candidate	Votes	%
André Bidal	2,502	26.51
Normand Courtemanche	1,863	19.74
Marc Larochelle	1,778	18.84
Donald Malette	1,663	17.62
Laurent Tregonning	1,631	17.28
Total valid votes	9,437	
