= Greater Sudbury City Council =

Ward Boundaries

Greater Sudbury City Council (French: Conseil municipal du Grand Sudbury) is the governing body of the City of Greater Sudbury, Ontario, Canada.

The council consists of the mayor plus a twelve-person council. The city is divided into twelve wards; each ward is represented by one councillor. The council meets at Tom Davies Square.

The city was created by amalgamating the former City of Sudbury with six suburban municipalities on January 1, 2001. Initially, the council structure consisted of six wards, each represented by two councillors. Ward boundaries in the new city were drawn by grouping former suburban municipalities with adjacent neighbourhoods in the former city. For the 2006 municipal election, council was reorganized into twelve single-member wards.

Past mayors of the city and the former suburban municipalities are listed at List of mayors of Sudbury, Ontario.

== 2000–2003 ==
Council elected in the 2000 municipal election:

Councillor	Ward	Notes
Jim Gordon	Mayor	
Eldon Gainer	Ward 1	
Gerry McIntaggart	Ward 1	
Ron Bradley	Ward 2	
Lionel Lalonde	Ward 2	
Ron Dupuis	Ward 3	
Louise Portelance	Ward 3	
Ted Callaghan	Ward 4	
Dave Kilgour	Ward 4	
Doug Craig	Ward 5	
Austin Davey	Ward 5	
David Courtemanche	Ward 6	
Mike Petryna	Ward 6	

== 2003–2006 ==
Council elected in the 2003 municipal election:

Councillor	Ward	Notes
David Courtemanche	Mayor	
Eldon Gainer	Ward 1	
Terry Kett	Ward 1	
Claude Berthiaume	Ward 2	
Ron Bradley	Ward 2	
Ron Dupuis	Ward 3	
André Rivest	Ward 3	
Ted Callaghan	Ward 4	
Russ Thompson	Ward 4	
Frances Caldarelli	Ward 5	
Doug Craig	Ward 5	
Janet Gasparini	Ward 6	
Lynne Reynolds	Ward 6	

== 2006–2010 ==
Council elected in the 2006 municipal election:

Councillor	Ward	Notes
John Rodriguez	Mayor	
Joe Cimino	Ward 1	
Jacques Barbeau	Ward 2	
Claude Berthiaume	Ward 3	
Evelyn Dutrisac	Ward 4	
Ron Dupuis	Ward 5	
André Rivest	Ward 6	
Russ Thompson	Ward 7	
Ted Callaghan	Ward 8	
Doug Craig	Ward 9	
Frances Caldarelli	Ward 10	
Janet Gasparini	Ward 11	
Joscelyne Landry-Altmann	Ward 12	

== 2010–2014 ==
Council elected in the 2010 municipal election.

Councillor	Ward	Notes
Marianne Matichuk	Mayor	
Joe Cimino	Ward 1	Elected to the Legislative Assembly of Ontario on June 12, 2014.
Gerry McIntaggart	Ward 1	Appointed on July 8, 2014, as temporary interim councillor following Cimino's resignation.
Jacques Barbeau	Ward 2	
Claude Berthiaume	Ward 3	
Evelyn Dutrisac	Ward 4	
Ron Dupuis	Ward 5	
André Rivest	Ward 6	
Dave Kilgour	Ward 7	
Fabio Belli	Ward 8	Died in office in April 2014.
Al Sizer	Ward 8	Appointed on June 26, 2014, as temporary interim councillor following Belli's death.
Doug Craig	Ward 9	
Frances Caldarelli	Ward 10	
Terry Kett	Ward 11	
Joscelyne Landry-Altmann	Ward 12	

As the vacancies in wards 1 and 8 occurred less than six months prior to the 2014 municipal election, by provincial law both were required to be filled by temporary appointment to the seat rather than in a conventional by-election. Sizer was appointed on June 26 to succeed Belli, and McIntaggart was appointed on July 8 to succeed Cimino. Unlike many cities in similar circumstances, Greater Sudbury City Council opted not to impose a requirement that the appointed councillors could not run for reelection in 2014; Sizer chose to run as a candidate and won reelection, while McIntaggart did not run.

== 2014–2018 ==
Council elected in the 2014 municipal election.

Councillor	Ward	Notes
Brian Bigger	Mayor	
Mark Signoretti	Ward 1	
Michael Vagnini	Ward 2	
Gerry Montpellier	Ward 3	
Evelyn Dutrisac	Ward 4	
Robert Kirwan	Ward 5	
René Lapierre	Ward 6	
Mike Jakubo	Ward 7	Finance Committee Chair
Al Sizer	Ward 8	Deputy Mayor
Deb McIntosh	Ward 9	
Fern Cormier	Ward 10	
Lynne Reynolds	Ward 11	
Joscelyne Landry-Altmann	Ward 12	Deputy Mayor

== 2018–2022 ==
Council elected in the 2018 municipal election.

Councillor	Ward	Notes
Brian Bigger	Mayor	
Mark Signoretti	Ward 1	
Michael Vagnini	Ward 2	
Gerry Montpellier	Ward 3	
Geoff McCausland	Ward 4	
Robert Kirwan	Ward 5	
René Lapierre	Ward 6	
Mike Jakubo	Ward 7	
Al Sizer	Ward 8	
Deb McIntosh	Ward 9	
Fern Cormier	Ward 10	
Bill Leduc	Ward 11	
Joscelyne Landry-Altmann	Ward 12	

== 2022–2026 ==
Council elected in the 2022 municipal election.

Councillor	Ward	Notes
Paul Lefebvre	Mayor	
Mark Signoretti	Ward 1	
(Michael Vagnini)	Ward 2	Found deceased (due to medical event) on February 12, 2024, several days after being reported missing.
Eric Benoit	Ward 2	Runner-up to Vagnini in the 2022 municipal election; appointed to council on March 8, 2024, following Vagnini's death.
(Gerry Montpellier)	Ward 3	Died on February 21, 2024.
Michel Guy Brabant	Ward 3	Runner-up to Montpellier in the 2022 municipal election; appointed to council on March 8, 2024.
Pauline Fortin	Ward 4	
Mike Parent	Ward 5	
René Lapierre	Ward 6	
Natalie Labbée	Ward 7	
Al Sizer	Ward 8	
Deb McIntosh	Ward 9	
Fern Cormier	Ward 10	
Bill Leduc	Ward 11	
Joscelyne Landry-Altmann	Ward 12	

== 2026–2030 ==
Council elected in the 2026 municipal election.

Councillor	Ward	Notes
Paul Lefebvre	Mayor	
Mark Signoretti	Ward 1	
Glen Duffy	Ward 2	
Marcel Montpellier	Ward 3	
Pauline Fortin	Ward 4	
Mike Parent	Ward 5	
René Lapierre	Ward 6	
Natalie Labbée	Ward 7	
Natalie Tessier	Ward 8	
Shawn Poland	Ward 9	
Cora DeMarco	Ward 10	
Mike Bleskie	Ward 11	
Jeff MacIntyre	Ward 12	

== Ward boundaries ==
- Ward 1: Gatchell, Robinson, the West End, Copper Park, Moonglo, South of Ontario St., and West of Regent St.
- Ward 2: Walden (Whitefish, Naughton, Lively, Worthington), Copper Cliff
- Ward 3: Onaping Falls (Onaping, Levack, Dowling), Chelmsford, Hull, Larchwood
- Ward 4: Azilda, Bélanger, Simard, Elm West, Donovan
- Ward 5: Val Caron, Blezard Valley, Nickeldale, Cambrian Heights Guilletville, Notre Dame, LaSalle area west of Rideau
- Ward 6: Val Thérèse, Hanmer
- Ward 7: Garson, Falconbridge, Skead, Capreol
- Ward 8: New Sudbury (east of Barry Downe Rd.)
- Ward 9: Coniston, Wahnapitae, Wanup, McFarlane Lake, South End
- Ward 10: Lockerby, Lo-Ellen, University Area, Kingsmount, Bell Park, Downtown (south of Elm Street)
- Ward 11: Minnow Lake, New Sudbury (west of Barry Downe Road, east of Arthur St, south of Lasalle Blvd.)
- Ward 12: Flour Mill, Downtown (north of Elm Street), New Sudbury (east of Rideau Street, west of Barry Downe Road & north of Lasalle Blvd.), Kingsway-Bancroft area

=== Former boundaries ===
From amalgamation in 2001 until reorganization in 2005, the wards were as follows:

- Ward 1: former Town of Walden, plus the communities of Copper Cliff, Gatchell, Robinson and the West End in the former city of Sudbury.
- Ward 2: former Towns of Rayside-Balfour and Onaping Falls, and the northwestern corner of old Sudbury.
- Ward 3: former City of Valley East, New Sudbury west of Rideau Street and the Cambrian Heights neighbourhood.
- Ward 4: former Town of Capreol, the northern half (Garson-Skead) of the former Town of Nickel Centre, the newly annexed geographic townships north and east of Lake Wanapitei, and New Sudbury east of Barry Downe Road.
- Ward 5: southern half (Coniston-Wahnapitae) of the former Town of Nickel Centre, the downtown core, most of the former Sudbury south of Ramsey Lake, and the newly annexed townships south of the former Regional Municipality.
- Ward 6: the only ward whose boundaries lay entirely within the old City of Sudbury, included the Flour Mill, Minnow Lake, Adamsdale and New Sudbury between Barrydowne Road and Rideau Street.
