= John Rodriguez (politician) =

Canadian politician (1937–2017)

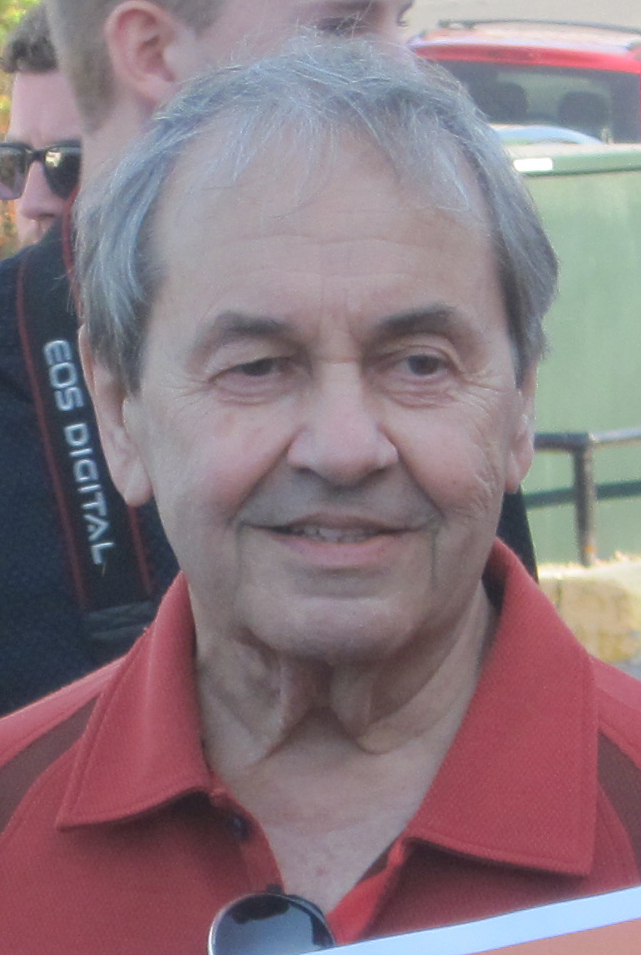
- John Rodriguez during a NDP local meeting in Sudbury in May 2014.

Mayor of Greater Sudbury, Ontario
- In office December 6, 2006 – November 30, 2010
- Preceded by: David Courtemanche
- Succeeded by: Marianne Matichuk

Member of Parliament for Nickel Belt
- In office 1984–1993
- Preceded by: Judy Erola
- Succeeded by: Ray Bonin
- In office 1972–1980
- Preceded by: Gaetan Serré
- Succeeded by: Judy Erola

Coniston Town Councillor
- In office 1971–1972

President of the Ontario English Catholic Teachers' Association
- In office 1968–1969
- Preceded by: Ruth Willis
- Succeeded by: John Kuchinak

Personal details
- Born: February 12, 1937 Georgetown, British Guiana
- Died: July 5, 2017 (aged 80) Greater Sudbury, Ontario, Canada
- Party: New Democratic Party
- Occupation: teacher

John R. Rodriguez (February 12, 1937 – July 5, 2017) was a Canadian politician. He served as the mayor of Greater Sudbury, Ontario from 2006 to 2010 and previously represented the electoral district of Nickel Belt in the House of Commons of Canada from 1972 to 1980 and from 1984 to 1993 as a member of the New Democratic Party.

== Early life and career ==
Rodriguez was born in Georgetown, British Guiana (now Guyana), and moved to Canada in 1956. He was of Portuguese descent. He attended Toronto Teachers' College, worked for a time as a teacher in St. Catharines, and moved to Coniston in Northern Ontario in 1962, where he was appointed as principal of St. Paul School. He also attended Laurentian University and earned a Bachelor of Arts degree in English and Spanish Literature.

Rodriguez became president of the Ontario English Catholic Teachers' Association in 1968. The following year, he led a protest outside Queen's Park to urge the provincial government of John Robarts to extend separate school funding to grades 11, 12 and 13. He also served on the Board of Governors of the Ontario Teachers' Federation in this period and promoted greater cooperation between teachers and organized labour.

Rodriguez joined the New Democratic Party upon its formation in 1961. He ran for mayor of Coniston in 1967 and by his own acknowledgement was soundly defeated by the incumbent, Michael Solski. He was elected to the Coniston town council in 1971. When Inco shut down its Coniston operations later in the year and appealed part of its municipal business tax, Rodriguez argued that the company had a moral responsibility to continue paying into a community it had helped to create. He did not seek re-election when Coniston was amalgamated into the new community of Nickel Centre.

== Federal politics ==
=== 1972 to 1980 ===
Rodriguez contested the riding of Nickel Belt in the 1972 federal election and defeated incumbent Member of Parliament (MP) Gaetan Serré of the Liberal Party. The Liberals under Pierre Trudeau won a narrow minority government in this election and governed for the next two years with unofficial parliamentary support from the NDP. Rodriguez opposed this arrangement and broke party ranks on two occasions to support non-confidence motions against the government. He became identified with the left wing of the NDP, was a vocal advocate of the party's pledge to nationalize Inco, and also called for the nationalization of Bell Canada and Canadian Pacific.

In 1973, Rodriguez took part in a study group on Northern Ontario that identified the region as a "social, economic and political ghetto" in relation to the rest of the province and sought to improve its status. In the same year, he led a campaign to allow Chilean refugees to resettle in Canada after the overthrow of Salvador Allende's democratically elected government. He spoke the words, "Vive Allende, vive Chile" at the end of one parliamentary speech.

Rodriguez was re-elected in the 1974 election, in which the Liberals won a majority government. The following year, he participated in efforts to prevent black activist Roosevelt Douglas from being deported from Canada. On one occasion, he recommended Liberal Solicitor-General Warren Allmand to Douglas' supporters as a sympathetic contact in the Trudeau government. It was later discovered that a Royal Canadian Mounted Police (RCMP) informer monitored both Allmand and Rodriguez on this matter, even though Allmand was the minister responsible for the RCMP at the time.

Also in 1975, Rodriguez criticized a sexist Canada Post advertisement which showed a man writing a postal code on the bottom of a thonged woman. Postmaster General Bryce Mackasey apologized for the ad.

Rodriguez was one of two MPs who called for the Atomic Energy Control Board to release all its information on the health hazards posed by radiation in Elliot Lake in 1976. The following year, he engaged in a filibuster against an income tax reform package that contained financial benefits for wealthy Canadians. Although filibusters are common practice in some parliamentary assemblies and later become more common in Canada, this was the first such incident to occur in the Canadian House of Commons in several years. Rodriguez spoke on the bill for six hours and ten minutes over a period of two days, setting a contemporary record.

In the late 1970s, Rodriguez argued that the federal government should purchase Inco's excess nickel stock to prevent job losses at a time when global prices were low. Prime Minister Trudeau rejected this proposal, arguing that it would depress the market even further. Rodriguez also joined with other Sudbury-area NDP politicians to support the 1978 Inco Strike, arguing that the workers would have suffered massive layoffs had they not taken this action.

Rodriguez broke with his party caucus when he opposed the suspension of Progressive Conservative MP Roch LaSalle from the House of Commons in 1978. LaSalle had referred to finance minister Jean Chrétien as a liar on three occasions and refused to apologize. The rest of the NDP caucus supported LaSalle's suspension.

Rodriguez was re-elected to a third term in the 1979 federal election, as the Progressive Conservatives under Joe Clark won a minority government. He was appointed as NDP Labour Critic in the parliament that followed.

In late 1979, Rodriguez emerged as the most prominent member of the NDP's "Left Caucus", a successor group of sorts to The Waffle. In a The Globe and Mail interview, Rodriguez said that the new group differed from The Waffle in that its ultra-left elements were minor and that it would abide by the results of NDP conventions, even if it did not agree with them. The Left Caucus was nonetheless opposed by the party leadership, which argued that it would hurt the NDP's chances of winning an election. Rodriguez spearheaded the group's only successful motion at the NDP's 1979 convention, protesting a jail sentence handed out to Jean-Claude Parrot of the Canadian Union of Postal Workers.

The Clark government lost a non-confidence motion in late 1979, and Canadians returned to the polls for another election in 1980. Rodriguez was defeated in Nickel Belt by Liberal candidate Judy Erola. Some local Progressive Conservatives later indicated that they ran a deliberately weak campaign to consolidate the opposition vote around Erola. Rodriguez criticized the Liberal campaign for portraying him as a borderline Marxist.

After leaving office Rodriguez returned to a high school principal position.

=== 1984 to 1993 ===
Rodriguez was re-elected to the House of Commons in the 1984 federal election, as the Progressive Conservatives won a landslide majority government under Brian Mulroney. Rodriguez was appointed as his party's critic on Unemployment Insurance (UI). In late 1984, he took part in a series of public forums organized by the NDP on the Mulroney government's record of job creation.

Rodriguez served on the Commons Standing Committee on Labour, Employment and Immigration from 1984 to 1988. He was a vocal critic of the Forget Commission's 1986 report on Unemployment Insurance reform, arguing that its reforms would drive Canadian social policy back to the nineteenth century. (One of Forget's recommendations was that persons unemployed for more than a year be forced to live on benefits as low as $40 per week.) Rodriguez later supported a committee report that rejected most of Forget's recommendations and made more generous counter-proposals. In the event, Employment and Immigration Minister Benoit Bouchard rejected both Forget's report and the committee's response and did not undertake any significant UI reforms during this parliament. Rodriguez also described newly appointed committee chair Claude Lanthier as unfit for the position in late 1987, after Lanthier announced his support for work-for-welfare schemes.

Rodriguez criticized aspects of the Mulroney government's new lobbyist registry in 1988, arguing that it would not adequately cover the leaders of industry associations. He nonetheless acknowledged, two years later, that the registry had changed Ottawa's culture of lobbying for the better. He was skeptical about the FedNor initiative launched in 1988, noting that the northern Ontario agency was created with only limited advisory powers.

Rodriguez was re-elected in the 1988 federal election, as the Mulroney government was returned to office with a reduced majority. He was appointed as his party's consumer and corporate affairs critic, and in this capacity he became a prominent opponent of the Mulroney government's Goods And Services Tax. He took part in a committee filibuster on the issue with fellow MP Dave Barrett and tried to have public hearings on the tax across Canada. Rodriguez was also strongly critical of the severe anti-inflationary policies pursued by Bank of Canada governor John Crow, arguing that the recession of the early 1990s was exacerbated by high interest rates that undermined consumer confidence. He called on the federal government to set credit card interest rates in 1989, after a series of dramatic increases at several major banks.

Rodriguez criticized the Mulroney government's austerity reforms to unemployment insurance in its second term, arguing that the greatest burden of the changes would fall on those who could least afford them. He also opposed the 1991 Bank Act, Trust and Loan Act on the grounds that it would allow major banks to eliminate smaller competition. Along with other MPs, he criticized the government's $4.4 billion bailout of Central Guaranty Trust in 1992.

Notwithstanding his criticisms of major banks, Rodriguez spent a week observing the inner workings of the Bank of Nova Scotia in the summer of 1991 as part of an immersion program for MPs arranged through the Parliament Business and Labour Trust. Scotiabank senior vice-president Geoff Bellew said that most bank leaders were impressed with Rodriguez, who in turn said that the experience expanded his knowledge base. He rejected claims that the program would make him less critical of the banks, joking that it would let him "concentrate his fire".

Rodriguez opposed the Gulf War in 1991 and called for Canada to play a peacekeeping role overseas.

Party affairs, 1989–1993

The NDP's failure to move beyond third-party status in the 1988 election was a disappointment for many in the party. In January 1989, Rodriguez became the first party MP to publicly suggest that party leader Ed Broadbent should considering resigning. He later backed away from this statement, but Broadbent did in fact announce his resignation in early March. Rumours circulated that Rodriguez would run to succeed him as party leader, but he instead gave his support to former British Columbia Premier Dave Barrett. Barrett was defeated by Audrey McLaughlin on the fourth ballot of the party's 1989 convention. Rodriguez ran for party whip in January 1990, but lost to Iain Angus.

The NDP's internal divisions became public in 1993, when Ontario MP Steven Langdon was removed as finance critic after criticizing the economic policies of Ontario NDP premier Bob Rae. Rodriguez said that he admired Langdon's stand, adding that he opposed Rae's decision to cut jobs and spending to fight the provincial deficit. He also accused Rae of alienating the NDP's labour allies and was particularly critical of proposed social contract legislation that was enacted later in the year. Unlike Langdon, Rodriguez was not sanctioned for his comments.

Rodriguez was defeated in the 1993 federal election by Liberal candidate Raymond Bonin. All Ontario NDP candidates were hurt by the Rae government's unpopularity, and Rodriguez chose to focus on his personal record while de-emphasizing the national campaign. Although he polled better than any Ontario NDP candidate apart from Langdon, he still lost by a significant margin.

Personality

Rodriguez was known as a colourful and outspoken MP, and often provided the media with clever and amusing quips. On one occasion, he described the president of a crown corporation as having the consultative skills of an oyster. On another, he lambasted Brian Mulroney as a "narrow political partisan" before adding "he's just the same as I am".

== Out of parliament ==
In 1994, Rodriguez called for provincial NDP cabinet minister Shelley Martel to resign for violating the privacy rights of an Ottawa consultant. He endorsed Svend Robinson's bid for the federal NDP leadership the following year, following Audrey McLaughlin's resignation. Robinson led on the first ballot of the party's leadership convention but gave his support to rival candidate Alexa McDonough when he realized that he did not have enough support to win.

Rodriguez later became principal of St. David Catholic School in the Sudbury area and was strongly critical of his forced retirement in 2005. "I'm not ready to retire", he said, "and I do resent being discriminated against because of my age". After leaving this position, he was hired as a enumerator with Statistics Canada. He also volunteered for the Heart and Stroke Foundation of Ontario and received a commemorative medal for the Queen's jubilee in 2003. In 2005, he praised former Liberal Prime Minister Jean Chrétien for his role in supporting Canada in the 1995 Quebec referendum.

== Mayor of Greater Sudbury ==
Campaign

In July 2006, Rodriguez announced that he would run for mayor of Greater Sudbury in the 2006 municipal election. He received endorsements from prominent local figures, including former mayor Jim Gordon, businessman and former mayoral candidate Paul Marleau, and former city councillor Gerry McIntaggart. One of his pledges was to lobby for Greater Sudbury to receive a share of the corporate taxes paid by mining companies to the federal and provincial governments. He also promised to preserve the distinct character of Greater Sudbury's outlying communities and criticized what he described as a "culture of entitlement" in some municipal services. His opponents accused him of making unrealistic promises; his pledge to eliminate homelessness was criticized by councillor Janet Gasparini, who applauded the goal but expressed doubts that this "growing national crisis" could be resolved in the short term at the municipal level. Gasparini argued that Rodriguez's plan largely consisted of asking the provincial government to provide more funding, which it refused to do in the past.

On election day, Rodriguez defeated incumbent mayor David Courtemanche by a significant margin.

Initiatives

Rodriguez announced an ambitious "first 100 days" agenda, highlighted by a reiteration of his pledge to seek a portion of federal and provincial mining taxes. He also pledged to create citizen committees that would to oversee a number of municipal projects (including the implementation of Floyd Laughren's report on service improvements), review the city's recreational facilities, move toward the construction of a performing arts centre, pursue economic growth opportunities in the health care sector, and devolve some legislative authority to existing local Community Action Networks. Rodriguez also promised to eliminate the fee on Greater Sudbury's TransCab service, which offers transportation to residents of remote areas not served by Greater Sudbury Transit; this fee was eliminated in the 2007 municipal budget.

Near the beginning of his term, Rodriguez announced that stores in the Greater Sudbury would not be permitted to open on Boxing Day. He introduced a 3-1-1 telephone service in early 2007, making it easier for residents to get information from city hall. Later in the same year, he successfully lobbied for the elimination of some local long-distance telephone charges. He signed on to the Workplace Safety & Insurance Board's Community Workplace Health and Safety Charter and played a major role in helping Theatre Cambrian find a new location. Rodriguez also resolved a long-standing cultural debate in the community by authorizing the Franco-Ontarian flag to be flown at Tom Davies Square. The latter decision was controversial: some praised the mayor for taking decisive action on the matter, while others accused him of isolating other cultural groups in the community. In all, the Sudbury Star described him as having had a good first year as mayor. He later introduced a fair wage policy and converted many part-time municipal jobs into full-time positions.

Throughout 2007 and 2008, Rodriguez promoted two major legacy projects for Greater Sudbury: a 1,800-seat performing arts centre and a large multi-use recreation complex. Member of Provincial Parliament Rick Bartolucci expressed skepticism about the viability of these initiatives, however, and council voted 7-6 against Rodriguez's funding formula in October 2008. Rodriguez acknowledged that the projects would need to be shelved for a while, but indicated that he planned to revisit them in the future.

In May 2009, Rodriguez announced the hiring of Greater Sudbury's first independent auditor. In the same month, he indicated that he would oppose any effort to dump nuclear waste in the area. During a discussion on public-private partnerships, Rodriguez said that he favoured continuing Greater Sudbury's policy of hiring contractors for construction and design but having the municipality own and operate its public assets.

As Mayor of Greater Sudbury, Rodriguez lobbied for more of the city's wealth to be put toward fields such as research in mining and environmental sciences, saying, "We have to seize the moment. We don't ever want to go back and be beholden to the big mining companies again." Following a global economic downturn in late 2008 and early 2009, he announced a series of initiatives to combat unemployment in the city. These included offering his support to a job sharing program, wherein workers at risk of being laid off would be kept on the payroll and paid through Employment Insurance.

Provincial politics

In the buildup to the 2007 provincial election, Rodriguez joined with four other Northern Ontario mayors to prepare a pre-election paper that addressed issues of concern to the region such as infrastructure renewal and water safety. Like his predecessor, Rodriguez argued that he and his colleagues would have more influence by working in a collaborative manner. He later issued a "Report of the Advisory Panel on Municipal Mining Revenues" in 2008, calling on the province of Ontario to use revenue from the provincial mining tax for infrastructure projects in mining communities. During the election campaign itself, Rodriguez attracted controversy by attending the opening of Liberal candidate Ron Dupuis' campaign office in Nickel Belt. Dupuis was the deputy mayor of the city, and Rodriguez's presence led to conflicting claims about whether he was formally endorsing his candidacy. He later clarified that he was not endorsing any candidate.

Controversies and disputes

Greater Sudbury City Council faced controversy in February 2008, when it was revealed that councillors purchased over 100 tickets to an Elton John concert at the Sudbury Arena before sales were opened to the general public. Rodriguez himself purchased 10 tickets. Over 71 of these tickets were returned after a public backlash. Rodriguez said that he followed an established city practice in making the tickets available, though he acknowledged that his decision to offer so many tickets was "rushed and not given sufficient consideration". He also said that he never expected the matter to provoke such opposition. The city council in Kitchener, Elton John's only other Canadian concert date during this tour, faced a similar controversy. The Greater Sudbury council later voted to give up its preferential access to arena events, with Rodriguez casting the deciding vote. Although the matter received extensive coverage, the Sudbury Star described it as a "silly controversy" in a 2009 editorial.

Rodriguez entered into a war of words with federal Industry Minister Tony Clement in July 2009, after the minister was interviewed by the Sudbury Star newspaper regarding a strike at Vale Inco's operations in Sudbury. Clement characterized Vale's 2006 takeover of Inco as having saved the company from imminent bankruptcy and the city of Sudbury from becoming a "valley of death". These remarks were widely criticized; former Inco CEO Scott Hand noted that, at the time of the takeover, Inco was a very stable and wealthy company which was the target of one of the most hotly contested bidding wars in recent Canadian business history and had not made any announcement suggesting jobs in the Sudbury area were under threat. Rodriguez made similar points in an open letter to Clement, also noting that Sudbury's economy had diversified from nickel mining. He was quoted as saying, "The most charitable thing I can say is maybe the minister has been misinformed." Clement later backtracked from his original remarks.

2010 election

Rodriguez sought re-election in the 2010 municipal election. During the campaign, challenger Marianne Matichuk, a relatively unknown political neophyte, attracted attention and support by issuing a daily series of press releases attacking aspects of Rodriguez's mayoral record; by the time Oraclepoll Research released its poll of voter intentions in the mayoral campaign on October 12, Matichuk was in second place with 31.5 per cent support, behind Rodriguez but ahead of longtime city councillor Ted Callaghan. Rodriguez tried during the campaign to portray Matichuk as a Tea Party candidate, accusing her in one debate of basing her campaign on "Sarah Palin mathematics."

On the final weekend before the election, the Sudbury Star published an article headlined, "City misled public about manager's dismissal," alleging that Rodriguez and the incumbent council had deliberately lied to the public about the resignation of Alan Stephen, the former manager of the city's infrastructure and emergency services division, in 2006. The incident described in the article was one in which the city appeared to simply have followed its legal obligation to maintain confidentiality around matters involving employee relations. Still, the article disclosed that Stephen promoted friends within his department, locked the city into 10-year contracts that cost the city up to $1.2 million annually, and took a leadership role at the site of an incident in which he was not qualified to do so, promoting a Ministry of Labour investigation into whether firefighters' lives were put at risk. The newspaper subsequently faced criticism for its portrayal of the story and for publishing the story only after it would be too late for Rodriguez or any other member of the city's staff to respond ahead of election day; in an interview on CBC Northern Ontario's Points North following the election, Sudbury Star managing editor Brian MacLeod pointed out that Rodriguez had several days to respond, but offered no comment on the story. He stated that the paper had received the information in an anonymous brown envelope several days before the story went to print. The Ontario Provincial Police subsequently announced that they were conducting an investigation into the leak.

On election day, Matichuk defeated Rodriguez by a ten-point margin. Rodriguez ultimately attributed his defeat to a "negative, American-style campaign". He announced in 2012 that he intended to run again for mayor in the 2014 municipal election. He was not successful in 2014, placing third.

== Electoral record ==
=== Election results ===
2014 Greater Sudbury municipal election, Mayor of Greater Sudbury

Candidate	Votes	%
Brian Bigger	27,303	46.32
Dan Melanson	11,345	19.25
John Rodriguez	10,243	17.38
Ron Dupuis	5,176	8.78
Jeff Huska	2,584	4.38
Richard Majkot	1,412	2.40
Jeanne Brohart	494	0.84
Jean-Raymond Audet	256	0.43
David Popescu	67	0.11
Ed Pokonzie	65	0.11
Total valid votes	58,945	100.0

2010 Greater Sudbury municipal election, Mayor of Greater Sudbury

Candidate	Votes	%
Marianne Matichuk	25,042	46.1
(x) John Rodriguez	19,819	36.5
Ted Callaghan	7,298	13.4
Derek Young	1,432	2.6
Zack Gauthier	390	0.7
Dennis Gorman	167	0.3
Ed Pokonzie	102	0.2
David Popescu	96	0.2
Total valid votes	54,346	

EastLink manager Marc Serré, the son of former federal Member of Parliament Gaetan Serré, also filed nomination papers, but withdrew from the mayoral race in the final week of nominations.

2006 Greater Sudbury municipal election: Mayor of Greater Sudbury
Candidate	Votes	%
John Rodriguez	28,419	51.89
(x)David Courtemanche	16,600	30.31
Lynne Reynolds	8,996	16.42
David Chevrier	429	0.78
Marc Crockford	159	0.29
Ed Pokonzie	92	0.17
David Popescu	76	0.14
Total valid votes	54,771	100.00

1993 Canadian federal election: Nickel Belt
Party	Candidate	Votes	%	±%	Expenditures
Liberal	Ray Bonin	25,237	57.19	+33.62	$42,807
New Democratic Party	John Rodriguez	10,197	23.11	−21.62	$52,551
Reform	Janice Weitzel	5,604	12.70		$4,156
Progressive Conservative	Ian Munro	2,395	5.43	−15.32	$4,808
National	Brian Woods	346	0.78		$0
Natural Law	Daniel Jolicoeur	173	0.39		$533
Non-Affiliated	Ernie Ashick	122	0.27		$571
Abolitionist	Cindy Burton	53	0.12		$0
Total valid votes		44,127	100.00		
Total rejected ballots		329			
Turnout		44,456	70.71	−5.47	
Electors on the lists		62,869			
Source: Thirty-fifth General Election, 1993: Official Voting Results, Published by the Chief Electoral Officer of Canada. Financial figures taken from official contributions and expenses provided by Elections Canada.

1988 Canadian federal election: Nickel Belt
Party	Candidate	Votes	%	±%	Expenditures
New Democratic	John Rodriguez	17,418	44.73	+6.13	$39,240
Liberal	Pierre Legros	9,178	23.57	−5.98	$36,271
Progressive Conservative	Richard Berthiaume	8,080	20.75	−10.45	$35,830
Confederation of Regions	Billie Christiansen	4,066	10.44		$9,695
Rhinoceros	Keith Claven	202	0.52	−0.13	$330
Total valid votes		38,944	100.00		
Total rejected ballots		147			
Turnout		39,091	76.18		
Electors on the lists		51,312			
Note: Percentage change numbers are not factored for redistribution.

1984 Canadian federal election: Nickel Belt
Party	Candidate	Votes	%	±%
New Democratic	John Rodriguez	17,141	38.60	−3.46
Progressive Conservative	Gord Slade	13,857	31.20	+21.00
Liberal	Judy Erola	13,124	29.55	−17.97
Rhinoceros	Derek Aardvark Orford	288	0.65	–
Total valid votes		44,410	100.00	
Total rejected ballots		250	0.01	
Turnout		44,660	79.55	
Electors on the lists		56,139		

1980 Canadian federal election: Nickel Belt
Party	Candidate	Votes	%	±%
Liberal	Judy Erola	19,805	47.52	+8.97
New Democratic	John Rodriguez	17,529	42.06	−1.31
Progressive Conservative	Dennis Tappenden	4,250	10.20	−7.63
Marxist–Leninist	David Starbuck	89	0.21	−0.04
Total valid votes		41,673	100.00	
Total rejected ballots		119		
Turnout		41,792	75.18	−1.90
Electors on the lists		55,587		

1979 Canadian federal election: Nickel Belt
Party	Candidate	Votes	%	±%
New Democratic	John Rodriguez	17,772	43.37	−6.41
Liberal	Judy Erola	15,799	38.55	+0.65
Progressive Conservative	Harwood Nesbitt	7,308	17.83	+5.51
Marxist–Leninist	David Starbuck	103	0.25	
Total valid votes		40,982	100.00	
Total rejected ballots		115		
Turnout		41,097	77.08	−0.28
Electors on the lists		53,320		
Note: Percentage change numbers are not factored for redistribution.

1974 Canadian federal election: Nickel Belt
Party	Candidate	Votes	%	±%
New Democratic	John Rodriguez	17,668	49.78	+3.75
Liberal	Gil Mayer	13,451	37.90	−1.79
Progressive Conservative	Ralph Connor	4,371	12.32	−0.20
Total valid votes		35,490	100.00	
Total rejected ballots		97		
Turnout		35,587	77.36	−1.65
Electors on the lists		46,001		
lop.parl.ca

1972 Canadian federal election: Nickel Belt
Party	Candidate	Votes	%	±%
New Democratic	John Rodriguez	14,033	46.03	+8.46
Liberal	Gaetan Serré	12,101	39.69	−5.41
Progressive Conservative	Bernie White	3,817	12.52	−4.81
Social Credit	Donat Breault	534	1.75	
Total valid votes		30,485	100.00	
Total rejected ballots		4,718		
Turnout		35,203	79.01	
Electors on the lists		44,556		
Note: The number of rejected ballots is not a misprint. Gaetan Serré initially called for these ballots to be reviewed, but withdrew his request on November 14, 1972 after viewing a sample. Source: "Review cancelled", Globe and Mail, 14 November 1972, 8. Source for results: Official Voting Results, Office of the Chief Electoral Officer (Canada), 1972.
