= 2000 Greater Sudbury municipal election =

Canadian municipal election

- November 13, 2000
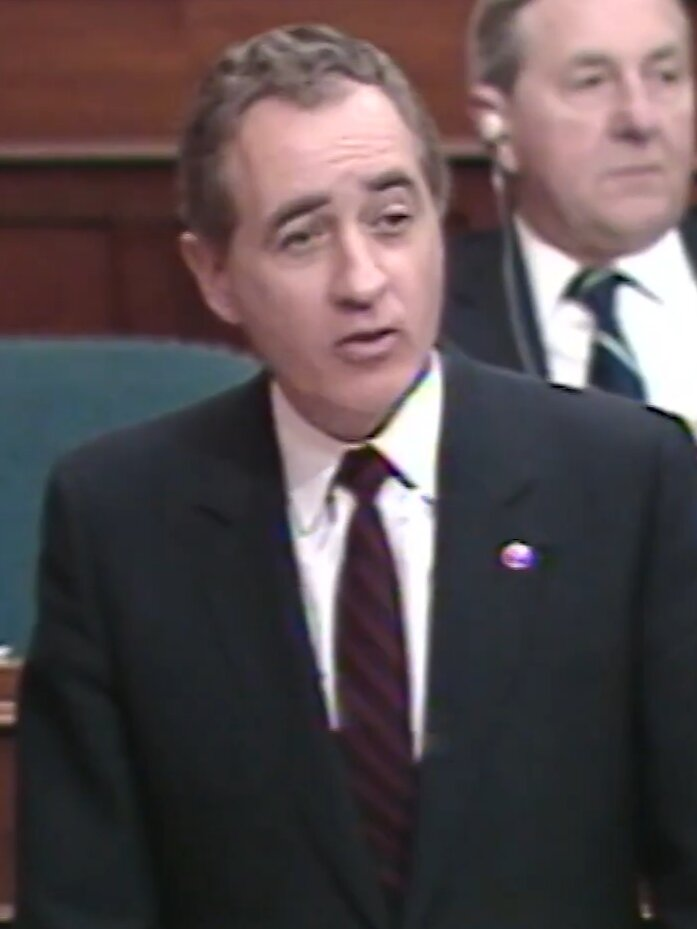
		MFP	RD
Candidate	Jim Gordon	Mary Fournier Pagnutti	Rick Doyon
Popular vote	44,220	3,923	3,668
Percentage	81.0%	7.2%	6.7%
Elected Mayor
Jim Gordon

The Greater Sudbury municipal election, 2000 was held in the city of Greater Sudbury, Ontario, Canada on November 13, 2000. All municipal elections in the province of Ontario are held on the same date.

The election chose the mayor and city councillors who would sit on the new Greater Sudbury City Council from 2000 to 2003, as well as trustees for the four school boards (Rainbow District School Board, Sudbury Catholic District School Board, Conseil scolaire de district du Grand Nord de l'Ontario and Conseil scolaire de district catholique du Nouvel-Ontario) that serve the city.

== Issues ==
The city of Greater Sudbury, in its current form, did not yet exist on the election date, but was legislated to come into effect on January 1, 2001. On the election date, the former government structure of the Regional Municipality of Sudbury and its seven constituent municipalities was still in place. The election, however, was held to choose the new city council.

The municipal amalgamation was controversial and unpopular, especially in the suburban municipalities. Virtually all of the municipal councils had only nominal authority over their own affairs throughout the year, as much of their power was transferred to the appointed transition board — consisting of Jim Ashcroft, Ron MacDonald, George Lund, Jim Griffin, Maurice Lamoureux, Gaetan Doucet and Terry Lee — which was overseeing the amalgamation. For example, Valley East's city council attempted in June to reduce its property taxes due to a budget surplus, but was overruled by the board as the council had lost its authority to adjust taxes during the transition period. The transition board also had sole authority over issues such as staffing decisions, user fees for municipal services, the possible closure of some public library branches, the structure and status of Greater Sudbury Utilities, and the new city's organizational structure, budget and tax assessment rates for 2001. Its operations throughout the year were frequently criticized as secretive and undemocratic, with some critics, including the Canadian Union of Public Employees, alleging that the board was preparing a sweeping privatization plan. Lamoureux, a former mayor of the pre-amalgamation city of Sudbury, also faced some controversy when he resigned from the transition board to register as a candidate for city council.

By election day, the transition board claimed that it had identified $13.8 million in savings as a result of the amalgamation process.

== Election and inauguration ==
With many incumbent councillors from all of the old municipalities running for a vastly reduced number of seats on the new amalgamated city council, many respected longtime councillors went down to defeat. Losses included longtime Sudbury councillors Ricardo de la Riva and Jim Ilnitski, Walden mayor Dick Johnstone, and Nickel Centre councillor Russ Thompson.

The new council was nominally sworn in on December 9, 2000, at the same time as in other Ontario municipalities; however, this was purely ceremonial and the council was unable to conduct any city business until the transition board's political authority was transferred back to them on January 1, 2001.

== Mayoral race ==
The winner of the mayoral race was Jim Gordon, the long-serving mayor of the former city of Sudbury. Gordon did not face serious opposition, and secured over 80 per cent of the vote.

2000 Greater Sudbury municipal election: Mayor of Greater Sudbury
Candidate	Votes	%
Jim Gordon	44,220	81.0
Mary Fournier Pagnutti	3,923	7.2
Rick Doyon	3,668	6.7
Carl St. John	1,955	3.6
Ed Pokonzie	472	0.9
David Popescu	339	0.6

== Council races ==
=== Ward 1 ===
Two to be elected.

Candidate	Votes	%
Eldon Gainer	4,245	26.9
Gerry McIntaggart	3,543	22.5
Vicki Kett	2,858	18.1
Dick Johnstone	2,371	15.0
Joe Cimino	1,998	12.7
Jim Chénier	745	4.7
Total valid votes	15,759	

=== Ward 2 ===
Two to be elected.

Candidate	Votes	%
Lionel Lalonde	5,257	31.7
Ron Bradley	4,126	24.9
Claude Berthiaume	3,388	20.4
Jim Ilnitski	2,618	15.8
Bill Hedderson	1,186	7.2
Total valid votes	16,575	

=== Ward 3 ===
Two to be elected.

Candidate	Votes	%
Ron Dupuis	2,907	19.8
Louise Portelance	2,617	17.8
André Rivest	2,340	15.9
Joe Niceforo	1,916	13.0
Maurice Lamoureux	1,395	9.5
Marc Landry	1,011	6.9
Roger Trottier	1,000	6.8
Leonard Zivny	913	6.2
Nicky Doyon	585	4.0
Total valid votes	14,684	

=== Ward 4 ===
Two to be elected.

Candidate	Votes	%
Ted Callaghan	4,213	32.8
Dave Kilgour	4,066	31.7
Russ Thompson	3,022	23.5
Rachel Proulx	1,540	12.0
Total valid votes	12,841	

=== Ward 5 ===
Two to be elected.

Candidate	Votes	%
Doug Craig	5,599	35.4
Austin Davey	3,386	21.4
Mila Wong	2,958	18.7
Peter McMullen	2,956	18.7
Marvin Julian	896	5.7
Total valid votes	15,795	

=== Ward 6 ===
Two to be elected.

Candidate	Votes	%
David Courtemanche	4,357	28.6
Mike Petryna	3,329	21.9
Janet Gasparini	2,939	19.3
Ricardo de la Riva	2,494	16.4
Claire Pilon	1,460	9.6
Ernie Savard	636	4.2
Total votes	15,215	100.00

=== School trustees ===
2000 Greater Sudbury municipal election, Trustee, Area One
Candidate	Total votes	% of total votes
Gord Santala	2,349	46.09
(incumbent)Muiriel MacLeod	2,150	42.18
Stephen L. Butcher	598	11.73
Total valid votes	5,097	100.00
