= 2003 Greater Sudbury municipal election =

2003 Ontario municipal election

- November 10, 2003
	DC	PM	CF
Candidate	David Courtemanche	Paul Marleau	Colin Firth
Popular vote	19,152	11,360	8,096
Percentage	35.56%	21.10%	15.03%
	LP	JC
Candidate	Louise Portelance	John Caruso
Popular vote	5,645	4,693
Percentage	10.48%	8.71%
Mayor before election
Jim Gordon
Elected Mayor
David Courtemanche

The Greater Sudbury municipal election, 2003 was held in the city of Greater Sudbury, Ontario, Canada on 10 November 2003. All municipal elections in the province of Ontario are held on the same date; see 2003 Ontario municipal elections for elections in other cities.

The election chose the mayor and city councillors who would sit on Greater Sudbury City Council from 2003 to 2006.

== Issues ==
The primary issue in the 2003 elections was the municipal amalgamation of 2001. Prior to 1 January 2001, the current city of Greater Sudbury consisted of seven separate municipalities, together comprising the Regional Municipality of Sudbury. On that date, the provincial government of Ontario dissolved all seven former municipalities and the regional government, merging them all into the current city government.

Under longtime mayor Jim Gordon, the preceding city council – the first to govern the amalgamated city – had struggled to pull the new city together, with soaring costs and deterioration of public services that had not been foreseen by the provincial government when the amalgamation was legislated. Voter anger was directed primarily at the provincial government of Mike Harris rather than the city council, although the council was criticized for some of the budgeting decisions it made, such as closing many municipally owned recreational facilities.

== Ward boundaries ==
When the current city of Greater Sudbury was created in 2001, the city was divided into six wards, each of which was represented by two councillors. This structure was controversial, as some voters felt that the division of responsibility among councillors was vague and ill-defined – it could, for example, be unclear which of the two ward councillors to approach in regards to a political issue.

In 2005, the city council adopted a new ward structure, in which the city would now be divided into twelve wards with a single councillor per ward. The new ward structure was implemented for the first time in the 2006 municipal election.

== Results ==
=== Mayoral race ===
Incumbent mayor Jim Gordon did not run for reelection in 2003. As a result of his retirement, the mayoral race attracted an unexpectedly large field of 14 candidates. This was the second largest slate of mayoral candidates of any Ontario city in this election cycle – Toronto was the only city in the province with more candidates for mayor. The race was generally perceived, however, to have two leading candidates: David Courtemanche, an incumbent city councillor, and Paul Marleau, a businessman and the husband of the city's federal Member of Parliament Diane Marleau.

Courtemanche was elected.

2003 Greater Sudbury municipal election: Mayor of Greater Sudbury
Candidate	Votes	%
David Courtemanche	19,152	35.56
Paul Marleau	11,360	21.10
Colin Firth	8,096	15.03
Louise Portelance	5,645	10.48
John Caruso	4,693	8.71
Tom Boyuk	1,930	3.58
Brian R. Gatien	1,280	2.38
Richard Doyon	667	1.24
Mary Fournier Pagnutti	405	0.75
David Chevrier	271	0.50
Yvonne Neison	141	0.26
Robert Maurice	102	0.19
Ed Pokonzie	67	0.12
David Popescu	42	0.08
Total valid votes	53,851	100.00

=== Ward 1 ===
Two to be elected.

Candidate	Votes	%
Terry Kett	5,028	31.64
Eldon Gainer (incumbent)	4,095	25.77
Joe Cimino	3,582	22.54
Gerry McIntaggart (incumbent)	3,187	20.05
Total valid votes	15,982	

=== Ward 2 ===
Two to be elected.

Candidate	Votes	%
Claude Berthiaume	3,815	23.99
Ron Bradley	3,679	23.13
Evelyn Dutrisac	3,067	19.28
Claude Gravelle	2,178	13.69
Carol-Ann Coupal	1,456	9.15
Bill Hedderson	1,074	6.75
Andrew Fahey	635	3.99
Total valid votes	15,904	

=== Ward 3 ===
Two to be elected.

Candidate	Votes	%
Ron Dupuis	4,355	30.69
André Rivest	3,098	21.83
Jean-Yves (John) Robert	3,065	21.60
Joe Niceforo	1,865	13.14
Robert Boileau	1,224	8.63
Maurice Sarrazin	583	4.11
Total valid votes	14,190	

=== Ward 4 ===
Two to be elected.

Candidate	Votes	%
Russ Thompson	3,315	23.57
Ted Callaghan	2,360	16.78
Rick Grylls	1,689	12.01
Daniel Gingras	1,629	11.58
Fabio Belli	1,517	10.79
Maurice Lamoureux	1,102	7.84
Tony Sharma	1,060	7.54
Jim Lanzo	1,022	7.27
Sean Peters	189	1.34
Harry Will	179	1.27
Total valid votes	14,062	

=== Ward 5 ===
Two to be elected.

Candidate	Votes	%
Doug Craig	5,226	30.05
Frances Caldarelli	3,926	22.57
Austin Davey	3,619	20.81
Jason Bubba	1,948	11.20
Fern Cormier	1,711	9.84
Neil Faddis	963	5.54
Total valid votes	17,393	

=== Ward 6 ===
Two to be elected.

Candidate	Votes	%
Janet Gasparini	3,923	25.81
Lynne Reynolds	2,642	17.38
Jim Ilnitski	2,565	16.87
Mike Petryna	2,379	15.65
Rick Villeneuve	1,552	10.21
Eric Thériault	604	3.97
Richard Madison	568	3.74
Jeff MacIntyre	411	2.70
Shawn Ouimet	294	1.93
Jerry O'Brien	263	1.73
Total valid votes	15,201	
