= David Courtemanche =

Canadian politician (born 1964)

Sudbury City Councillor
- In office 1997–2000
- Succeeded by: City of Sudbury amalgamated into Greater Sudbury

Greater Sudbury Ward 6 City Councillor (with Mike Petryna)
- In office 2000–2003
- Preceded by: position created
- Succeeded by: Janet Gasparini and Lynne Reynolds

Mayor of Greater Sudbury
- In office 2003–2006
- Preceded by: Jim Gordon
- Succeeded by: John Rodriguez

Personal details
- Born: 7 April 1964 (age 62) Sudbury, Ontario, Canada
- Occupation: city councillor, management consultant

David Courtemanche (born 7 April 1964) is a politician in Ontario, Canada. He is the former mayor of Greater Sudbury, having served one term from 2003 to 2006.

== Background ==
Courtemanche was raised in West End, Sudbury Ontario. A former student of St. Charles College, he played hockey for the Sudbury Wolves and the Kingston Canadians. Though given a tryout with the New York Rangers he chose not to pursue hockey as a career. He completed a degree in Political Studies at the University of Guelph. Courtemanche later returned to Sudbury and worked as a consultant. He was the executive director of Sudbury Heart Health from 1992 to 1997 and was a founding member of Earthcare Sudbury, a partnership between the city and various local agencies in support of a sustainable environmental policy.

== Councillor ==
Courtemanche was elected to the Sudbury City Council in the 1997 municipal election and was subsequently appointed as a city representative to the Sudbury Regional Council. He chaired the region's Planning and Development Committee, and was part of a group that developed Sudbury's first comprehensive arts policy. He supported the introduction of a Business Improvement Area, and brought forward an unsuccessful motion to deregulate the city's shopping hours in 1999.

Sudbury and its suburban municipalities were amalgamated into the city of Greater Sudbury in 2000. During the transition period Courtemanche was strongly critical of a plan for the new city councillors to be designated as part-time rather than full-time workers. He argued that the demands on councillors would be greater after amalgamation and that part-time status would result in bureaucrats controlling city hall.

Courtemanche was re-elected in the 2000 municipal election, winning a seat in the new city's sixth ward. During this campaign he called for a strategic growth model approach to municipal infrastructure that would benefit the entire city. He was appointed to the board of the Nickel District Conservation Authority in March 2001, and later co-chaired a Mayor's Task Force on Volunteerism and Community Involvement, which led to the development of Community Action Networks. Courtemanche also served on the board of directors of the Federation of Canadian Municipalities and was appointed to chair Greater Sudbury's Priorities Committee in December 2002.

In 2002, Courtemanche proposed that Greater Sudbury's largest park be named after former prime minister Pierre Elliott Trudeau. He later brought forward a motion to fly the Franco-Ontarian flag at Tom Davies' Square.

== Mayoralty ==
Courtemanche was elected mayor of Greater Sudbury in the 2003 municipal election after the retirement of incumbent Jim Gordon. At 39 years old Courtemanche was the youngest elected mayor in the history of Sudbury. His "Campaign for Change" was highlighted by promises of sustainable growth and collaborative leadership. Courtemanche led in the polls for much of the campaign, and defeated local businessman Paul Marleau and 12 other opponents on election day. (Only Toronto, with 44 candidates, had a larger mayoralty contest.) Following his election, Courtemanche said that he would seek a non-confrontational civil service and better relations with unions and management. A local editorial described him as a candidate who "always seems to naturally find the high road and knows how to stay there".

During his first year as mayor Courtemanche increased the role of public consultation in Greater Sudbury's budgetary and planning processes. He sought to limit average tax increases to 7%, but ultimately introduced a budget with 7.5% increases. Later that year a cut in education taxes reduced property tax rates by about 3%.

In his inauguration speech Courtemanche promised to change the municipal government's senior management structure. He reiterated this pledge after difficulties with his first budget. Three senior staff positions were cut later in the year. The Sudbury Star newspaper criticized the mayor's restructuring plan, arguing that it was not conducted in an open and accountable manner. Courtemanche later engaged in a public dispute with councillor Lynne Reynolds over this and other aspects of his leadership.

Courtemanche worked with councillor Janet Gasparini on programs targeting homelessness. He also supported wind power investment, and sought to develop Greater Sudbury as an attractive destination for senior citizens. In May 2004, the City of Greater Sudbury received an environmental award from the Federation of Canadian Municipalities and CH2M Hill Canada for its EarthCare Sudbury Local Action Plan. Despite complaints from some business owners, Courtemanche did not change the city's strict anti-smoking bylaw. He again sought to remove Greater Sudbury's shopping hours bylaw in 2004, without success. He helped introduce a municipal health strategy in 2005, after a national survey showed that Sudburians were living shorter lives and were at higher risk of cardiovascular disease than other urban Canadians. Courtemanche launched the Mysudbury.ca web portal in March 2005, and helped to introduce a Centre for Excellence in Mining Innovation (CEMI) in the city. Late in his term, he introduced a pilot project to encourage the use of energy efficient products.

In early 2004 Courtemanche met with the mayors of North Bay, Timmins, Thunder Bay and Sault Ste. Marie to seek a new deal with senior levels of government for investment in Northern Ontario. The mayors called on the provincial government to solve some of southern Ontario's long-term problems (such as gridlock, air pollution and failing infrastructure) by shifting the focus of development to the north. Greater Sudbury received a significant increase in provincial government transfers in 2006. Courtemanche also lobbied the federal government on the importance of immigration to rural and peripheral regions. He represented his city at the opening of the Northern Ontario School of Medicine, which has twin campuses in Thunder Bay and Sudbury.

Workers at Greater Sudbury Utilities (GSU) Inc. took part in an extended strike in 2004, in a dispute over retiree benefits. Courtemanche met Canadian Union of Public Employees Ontario leader Sid Ryan in September of that year, which brought about a resumption of face-to-face bargaining. The strike ended a month later. Courtemanche later called on Hydro One to turn over its assets and customers to GSU believing that the city could provide better services for lower rates.

In 2006, Courtemanche appointed former provincial cabinet minister Floyd Laughren to head a local committee stemming from complaints about amalgamation of Greater Sudbury six years earlier. Several residents in outlying areas had previously signed a petition calling for a referendum on de-amalgamation.

Courtemanche was defeated in the 2006 municipal election, losing to former Member of Parliament (MP) John Rodriguez. The local media noted that he failed to inspire voters, and did not effectively counter Rodriguez's populist appeal. Courtemanche later acknowledged that he turned down his team's advice to take a more aggressive approach, arguing that it was not his style.

Courtemanche was mayor during a period of economic growth, which continued into the tenure of his successor.

== Since 2006 ==
Courtemanche returned to his consulting firm, Leading Minds Inc. In June 2008 he was named executive director for the City of Lakes Family Health Team (FHT), a primary health care initiative in Sudbury.

== Electoral record ==
2006 Greater Sudbury municipal election: Mayor of Greater Sudbury
Candidate	Votes	%
John Rodriguez	28,419	51.89
(x)David Courtemanche	16,600	30.31
Lynne Reynolds	8,996	16.42
David Chevrier	429	0.78
Marc Crockford	159	0.29
Ed Pokonzie	92	0.17
David Popescu	76	0.14
Total valid votes	54,771	100.00

2003 Greater Sudbury municipal election: Mayor of Greater Sudbury
Candidate	Votes	%
David Courtemanche	19,152	35.56
Paul Marleau	11,360	21.10
Colin Firth	8,096	15.03
Louise Portelance	5,645	10.48
John Caruso	4,693	8.71
Tom Boyuk	1,930	3.58
Brian R. Gatien	1,280	2.38
Richard Doyon	667	1.24
Mary Fournier Pagnutti	405	0.75
David Chevrier	271	0.50
Yvonne Neison	141	0.26
Robert Maurice	102	0.19
Ed Pokonzie	67	0.12
David Popescu	42	0.08
Total valid votes	53,851	100.00

2000 Greater Sudbury municipal election: Councillor, Ward Six (two elected)
Candidate	Votes	%
(x)David Courtemanche	4,357	28.64
(x) Mike Petryna	3,329	21.88
Janet Gasparini	2,939	19.32
(x) Ricardo de la Riva	2,494	16.39
Claire Pilon	1,460	9.60
Ernie Savard	636	4.18
Total votes	15,215	100.00

Electors could vote for two candidates. Percentages are determined in relation to the total number of votes.

Courtemanche was first elected to the Sudbury city council in 1997.

The 2000 and 2003 results are taken from the Sudbury Star newspaper. The 2006 result is provided by the City of Greater Sudbury.
