= Marianne Matichuk =

Canadian politician

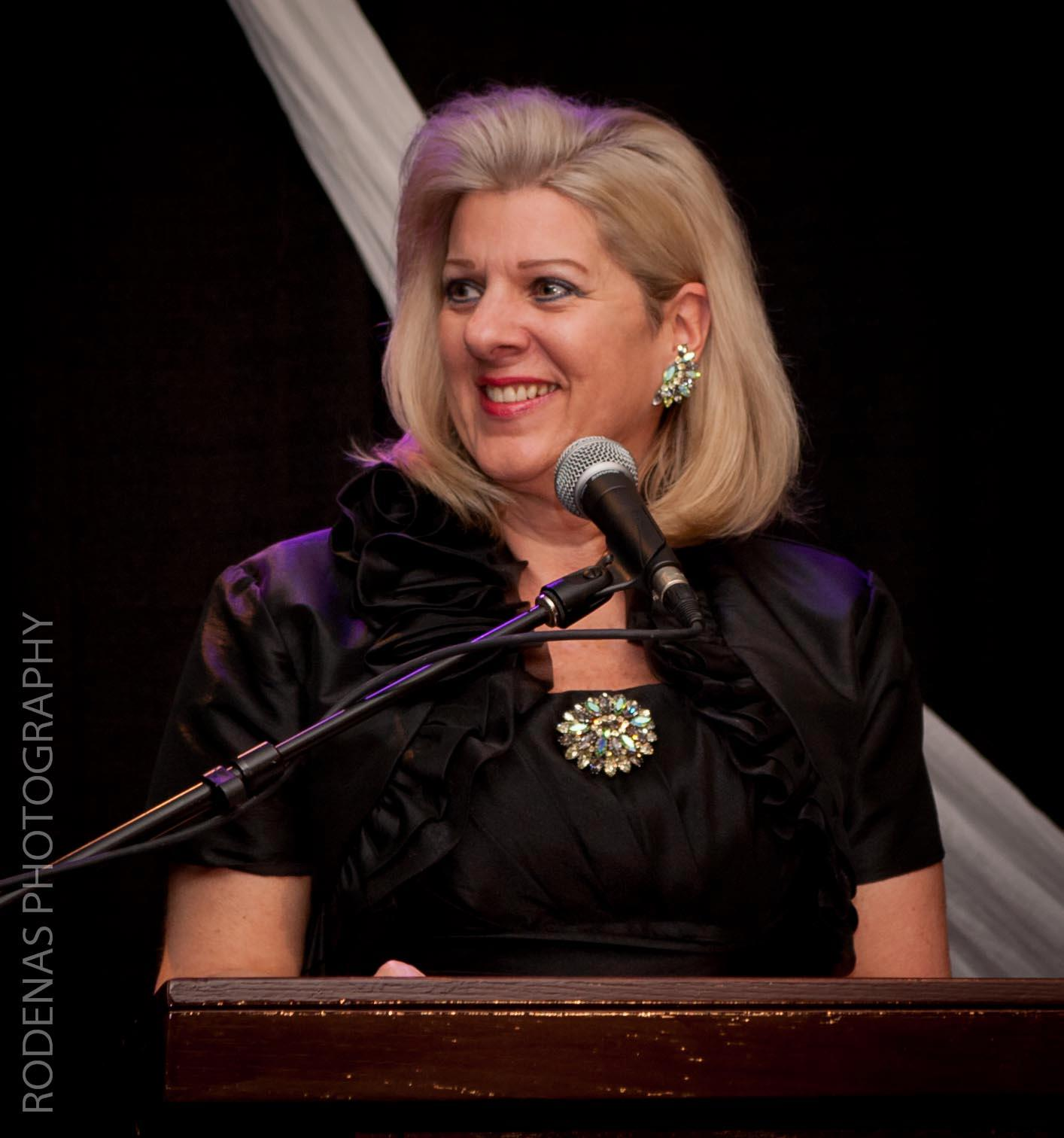
- Marianne Matichuk in 2012

Mayor of Greater Sudbury
- In office December 1, 2010 – November 30, 2014
- Preceded by: John Rodriguez
- Succeeded by: Brian Bigger

Personal details
- Born: Sudbury, Ontario, Canada
- Education: Laurentian University, Cambrian College
- Occupation: Businesswoman, politician

Marianne Matichuk is a Canadian politician who was elected mayor of Greater Sudbury, Ontario, in the 2010 municipal election. She made history as the city's first elected female mayor and only the second serving woman mayor. Grace Hartman had previously been appointed mayor following the death of Max Silverman in 1966.

== Campaign ==
An occupational health and safety consultant, first with the city and later with Vale's operations in the Sudbury area, Matichuk was virtually unknown before launching her mayoral campaign in September 2010. However, she quickly gained attention with a focused campaign in which she issued a series of daily press releases attacking aspects of incumbent mayor John Rodriguez's record; by the time Oraclepoll Research released its poll of voter intentions in the mayoral campaign on October 12, Matichuk was in second place with 31.5 per cent support, behind Rodriguez but ahead of longtime city councillor Ted Callaghan.

She made few concrete campaign promises of her own; those she did make included doing a line item review of the city's budget and permitting retail stores in the city to open on Boxing Day.

The mayoral candidacy of David Popescu, a perennial candidate in the Sudbury area who was convicted of hate speech after advocating the execution of homosexuals in the 2008 federal election campaign, also emerged as a minor issue when he was permitted to participate in a mayoral debate sponsored by the Greater Sudbury Chamber of Commerce. Matichuk publicly criticized the Chamber of Commerce for not excluding Popescu from the debate, while opposing candidate Derek Young called Matichuk's move a populist ploy that would both undermine the democratic process and distract from other issues in the debate, and the Chamber of Commerce reiterated that its standing policy when sponsoring political debates was to invite all registered candidates regardless of their personal views. Popescu had already participated in other mayoral debates during the 2010 election campaign without incident, and none of the candidates for mayor, including Matichuk, opted to boycott the Chamber of Commerce debate over Popescu's inclusion.

On October 22, the final Friday before election day, Matichuk secured the endorsement of the Sudbury Star. The paper noted her lack of political experience and the highly negative tone of her campaign — in an earlier editorial, in fact, the paper had named her alongside Toronto mayoral candidate Rob Ford as an example of an apparent Tea Party mentality entering into Ontario's municipal elections — but argued that in public debates and other dealings with the city's media, she had shown herself to be a substantial and practical voice. Rodriguez also tried to portray Matichuk as a Tea Party sort of candidate, accusing her in one debate of basing her campaign on "Sarah Palin mathematics" and ultimately attributing his defeat to a "negative, American-style campaign".

== Mayoralty ==
Matichuk's relationship with Greater Sudbury City Council and with city staff was relatively adversarial. Councillors often accused her of political inexperience, arguing that she often tried to get her agenda passed by attacking councillors who opposed her rather than by reaching out to build consensus, and that she did not communicate with council or staff about her policy proposals, while Matichuk dismissed the criticism as "little games" and "absolute garbage", claiming that councillors had no interest in working with her at all and asserting that any councillor who didn't support her agenda should resign.

On February 9, 2011, Matichuk introduced a motion at a city council meeting to deregulate retail store hours in the city for a one-year trial period, in accordance her campaign pledge. However, the motion was defeated, and Matichuk faced criticism for her strategy of spontaneously bringing the motion forward without giving city councillors advance notice of her intention to do so. The motion was fast forwarded by councillor Dave Kilgour. Council ultimately decided to put the question of retail store hours to a voter referendum in the 2014 election. Matichuk, however, voted against the referendum, arguing that it was council's job to make the decision.

Several other initiatives put forward by Matichuk, including a recall bylaw and a salary freeze, also failed to pass at city council. As well, her office faced a high volume of staff turnover, with eight employees leaving, over the course of her term, from a staff of four. She was, however, able to bring the Northern Ontario Film Studio (former mothballed arena) to Sudbury, as well as the Laurentian School of Architecture location downtown and relocation of the Farmer's Market. She introduced an attrition policy for city staff, and introduced line-item review of the budget that saw CAD 5 million in savings.

Matichuk announced on June 19 that she would not run for a second term as mayor. Despite the controversies that marred her first term in office, however, Oraclepoll Research's first poll of the race, released on June 24, 2014, suggested that she still held a healthy lead over any of the declared candidates among decided voters, with 38.1 per cent support.

== Other political activities ==
In the early months of the 2014 municipal election campaign, Matichuk's silence about her reelection plans became a provincewide story when Toronto Star journalist Robert Benzie reported on Twitter that sources within the Ontario Liberal Party were claiming that Premier Kathleen Wynne would appoint Matichuk as the party's candidate in the provincial electoral district of Sudbury for the 2014 provincial election. Both Wynne and Matichuk denied the reports; however, the speculation failed to die down because of Matichuk's continued lack of clarity about her plans, and the local Liberal riding association's inability to get a firm date commitment for its nomination meeting from the party's head office. The party finally nominated Andrew Olivier as its candidate on May 8.

In January 2015, Matichuk expressed interest in running as a Liberal candidate for the electoral district of Sudbury in the 2015 federal election. She lost the nomination to lawyer and media proprietor Paul Lefebvre on March 28.

As of 2023, Matichuk currently holds positions on several boards, including chair of Workplace Safety & Prevention Services Ontario, board director at CAA North & East Ontario, and past president of Business & Professional Women Greater Sudbury. She has also served as a past board member on the international board of the Canada Nevada Business Council, as well as the national governor on the Board of Canadian Registered Safety Professionals.

Matichuk was once again rumored to be the Ontario Liberal candidate for Sudbury after it was revealed that she was endorsing Bonnie Crombie for leader of the Ontario Liberals in 2023. However, she later denied the rumors in both 2023 and again in 2024. Rashid Mukhtar Choudhry was ultimately selected as the candidate in 2025.

Matichuk endorsed Marc G. Serré and Viviane Lapointe for re-election as the Liberal candidates for Sudbury East - Manitoulin - Nickel Belt and Sudbury, respectively.
