= 2006 Greater Sudbury municipal election =

Canadian municipal election

- November 13, 2006
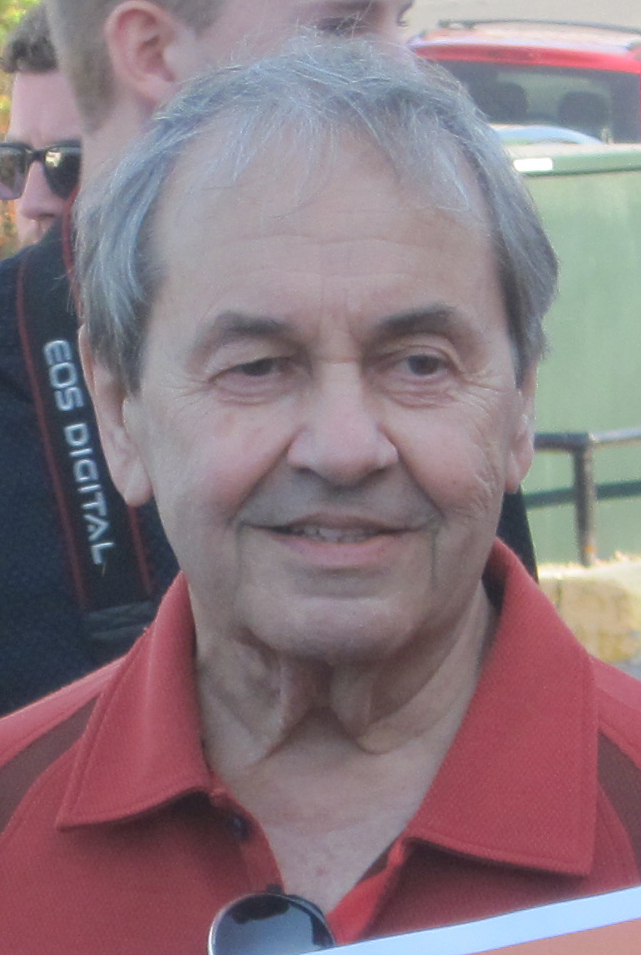
		DC	LR
Candidate	John Rodriguez	David Courtemanche	Lynne Reynolds
Popular vote	28,419	16,600	8,996
Percentage	51.89%	30.31%	16.42%
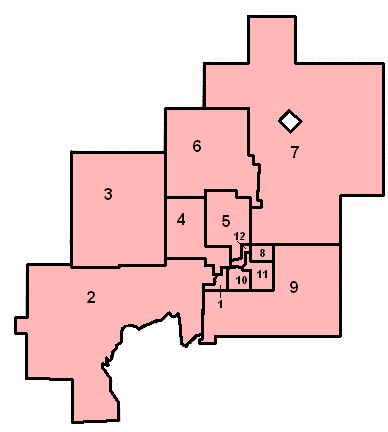
- Ward boundaries of the City of Greater Sudbury
Mayor before election
David Courtemanche
Elected Mayor
John Rodriguez

The Greater Sudbury municipal election, 2006 was held in the city of Greater Sudbury, Ontario, Canada on November 13, 2006. All municipal elections in the province of Ontario are held on the same date; see 2006 Ontario municipal elections for elections in other cities.

The election chose the mayor and city councillors who will sit on Greater Sudbury City Council. As with other Ontario municipal elections, the 2006 election marked the first time that Ontario's city councils will sit for a four-year term; until 2006, municipal elections were held every three years.

== Issues ==
The primary issue in the 2006 elections was the municipal amalgamation of 2001. Prior to January 1, 2001, the current city of Greater Sudbury consisted of seven separate municipalities, together comprising the Regional Municipality of Sudbury. On that date, the provincial government of Ontario dissolved all seven former municipalities and the regional government, merging them all into the current city government. However, many residents of the outlying communities in the city have alleged that their municipal services have deteriorated significantly since the amalgamation.

In early 2006, residents of the former town of Rayside-Balfour began to campaign for the de-amalgamation of the city and the return of the former municipal government structure. The city government has refused to endorse the petition — even if the petition were endorsed by the city, however, any de-amalgamation referendum would still require the consent of the provincial Ministry of Municipal Affairs and Housing, which has set a number of very strict conditions for permitting a referendum.

Mayor David Courtemanche announced an advisory committee, chaired by former Member of Provincial Parliament Floyd Laughren, to consult with communities in the city and seek solutions to their concerns about municipal government services. This committee did not submit its final report to the city until January 10, 2007, several weeks after the 2006 municipal election, although a summary of the issues raised during the initial consultations, as well as an outline of the final report process, was presented in advance of the election.

In June 2006, the city was also criticized for its handling of a leave of absence taken by fire chief Don Donaldson, as well as a study which found that Sudbury had the highest-paid mayor and councillors of any Ontario city in its population range. Council has been also criticized for several development-related decisions, including a $13 million expansion of the Kingsway between Minnow Lake and Coniston, a controversial decision to permit construction of a new school and a medical office building on the Lily Creek marshlands near Science North, and a project to increase sewer capacity in the South End (Ward 9) area by construction of a rock tunnel. Following a $4 million budget shortfall in the latter project, the city imposed special development fees on new residential and commercial construction in the neighbourhood.

With the recent takeovers of two of the city's major employers, Falconbridge Ltd. by Swiss mining giant Xstrata and Inco Limited by the Brazilian company CVRD, and the recent financial crisis faced by the city's Northern Breweries, the issues of jobs and economic development in the city were also expected to play a role in the election campaign. One of John Rodriguez's campaign planks was to lobby for the city to be given a share of the corporate taxes paid by the mining companies to the federal and provincial governments; the inability to directly tax two of the city's largest employers has been cited in the past as a barrier to the city's economic and social development.

Some candidates also cited the desire to see more women serve on council; only six of the 45 declared candidates in the 2006 election were women, and three of those six were incumbent councillors. In the final election results, four of the five women running for council seats were elected; one female ward candidate was not elected, nor was mayoral candidate Lynne Reynolds.

== Mayoral race ==
2006 Greater Sudbury municipal election: Mayor of Greater Sudbury
Candidate	Votes	%
John Rodriguez	28,419	51.89
(x)David Courtemanche	16,600	30.31
Lynne Reynolds	8,996	16.42
David Chevrier	429	0.78
Marc Crockford	159	0.29
Ed Pokonzie	92	0.17
David Popescu	76	0.14
Total valid votes	54,771	100.00

Earlier in 2006, local media speculated that former mayor Jim Gordon might run for mayor again as well, but in September he ended that speculation by endorsing Rodriguez; Gordon had endorsed Courtemanche in 2003. Rodriguez was also endorsed by 2003 mayoral candidate Paul Marleau, former city councillor Gerry McIntaggart and the Sudbury and District Labour Council.

During the campaign, Rodriguez was sometimes criticized for making potentially unrealistic promises, such as eliminating homelessness in the city, which depended on lobbying the provincial or federal governments for funding and program cooperation that those governments had not guaranteed would be made available. However, both of his main opponents were also criticized as well. Courtemanche, who did not officially declare his candidacy until just a few days before the nomination deadline, was viewed by many voters as having been a weak and ineffective leader during the previous council term, and faced allegations that he had held off his campaign launch until the last minute precisely to insulate himself from having to answer that criticism on the campaign trail. Reynolds, meanwhile, was criticized by the city's media for a vague and confrontational campaign which was critical of the existing council, but offered very few specific new ideas of her own.

A Sudbury Star opinion poll published on November 1 placed Rodriguez in the lead with 49 per cent support among decided voters, with Courtemanche trailing at 30 per cent and Reynolds at 20 per cent. The other four candidates had approximately one per cent support combined.

On the final weekend before the election, Reynolds garnered the endorsement of the Sudbury Star, while the community newspaper Northern Life endorsed Courtemanche. Both newspapers acknowledged that Rodriguez had been the most successful of the three at defining the issues and direction of the campaign, but cited misgivings about his agenda as their principal reason for choosing not to endorse him.

== Ward boundary adjustments ==
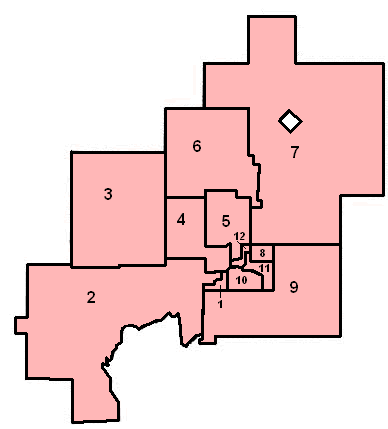
New ward map for 2006

When the current city of Greater Sudbury was created in 2001, the city was divided into six wards, each of which was represented by two councillors. In 2005, the city council adopted a new ward structure, in which the city would now be divided into twelve wards with a single councillor per ward.

This redistribution of wards was itself controversial, because it divided some communities within the city that were formerly closely associated with each other — for example, the former town of Rayside-Balfour was split, with Azilda falling in Ward 4 and Chelmsford falling in Ward 3. The original ward structure had also been designed to balance political power, crossing the pre-2001 municipal boundaries to help prevent the urban core of the city from ignoring the needs of the more rural communities.

Under the new ward structure, however, five of the twelve wards are purely urban, and it has been alleged that this may weaken the city's ability to respond to the needs of residents outside of the central city. Floyd Laughren's final report on municipal government services, tabled in early 2007, included a recommendation for further adjustments to make ward boundaries more closely correspond to the former municipal divisions. Laughren specifically noted the former towns of Capreol and Onaping Falls as communities that should be reconstituted as their own distinct city wards.

== Results ==
In addition to David Courtemanche, two incumbent councillors were also defeated — notably, both represented wards outside of the pre-2001 city boundaries, and hence may have been vulnerable in part because of the amalgamation referendum controversy. The councillors whose wards were most directly affected by the Kingsway, Lily Creek and South End sewer tunnel controversies were all re-elected. Two wards, both in the old city, had no incumbent councillor running for reelection.

In Ward 12, the city's website initially named John Caruso as the winner with 1,798 votes, to challenger Joscelyne Landry-Altmann's 1,756. However, the city later reported an apparent technical error in the upload of vote totals to the website, with 460 votes mistakenly uploaded twice. (This error did not affect the actual vote tabulations, merely the reported totals on the election results webpage.) In the adjusted count, Landry-Altmann won over Caruso by a similarly narrow margin. Caruso called for a recount, which was conducted on December 1 and confirmed Landry-Altmann's victory.

=== Councillors ===
Candidate	Vote	%
Ward 1
Joe Cimino	3,016	68.6
Carlos Reyes	1001	22.8
John Mathew	382	8.7
Robert Allard (withdrawn)		
Ward 2
Jacques Barbeau	1,838	35.81
Terry Kett (X)	1,730	33.70
Sandy Bass	1,153	22.46
Stephen L. Butcher	223	4.34
Travis Morgan	189	3.68
Ward 3
Claude Berthiaume (X)	3,094	65.3
Mike Dupont	1,167	24.6
Bill Hedderson	479	10.1
Ward 4
Evelyn Dutrisac	2,663	63.1
Ronald Bradley (X)	967	22.9
Marcel Rainville	318	7.5
Robert Boileau	275	6.5
Ward 5
Ron Dupuis (X)	2,051	51.5
Louise Portelance	1,931	48.5
Yvan Robert (withdrawn)		
Ward 6
André Rivest (X)	2,115	44.5
Robert Kirwan	1,523	32.0
Henri Lagrandeur	1,116	23.5
Ward 7
Russ Thompson (X)	2,264	55.6
Dave Kilgour	1,811	44.4
Ward 8
Ted Callaghan (X)	2,765	70.9
Harry Will	1,135	29.1
Ward 9
Doug Craig (X)	1,958	42.3
Jim Sartor	1,497	32.3
John Cochrane	787	17.0
Marvin Julian	387	8.4
Fran Nault (withdrawn)		
Ward 10
Frances Caldarelli (X)	2,301	43.5
Austin Davey	1,737	32.9
Fern Cormier	1,246	23.6
Ward 11
Janet Gasparini (X)	2,310	48.4
Mike Petryna	1,381	29.0
Rick Villeneuve	1,079	22.6
Ward 12
Joscelyne Landry-Altmann	1,586	40.1
John Caruso	1,529	38.6
Derek Young	516	13.0
Will Brunette	329	8.3

=== School trustees ===
2006 Greater Sudbury election, Trustee, Rainbow District School Board, Area 1
Candidate	Total votes	% of total votes
(incumbent) Gord Santala	accl.	.

2006 Greater Sudbury election, Trustee, Sudbury Catholic District School Board, Ward Five
Candidate	Total votes	% of total votes
(incumbent)Paula Peroni	1,570	49.73
Ted Szilva	1,038	32.88
Geraldine Meskell	549	17.39
Total valid votes	3,157	100.00

== Follow-up ==
The new council was sworn in on December 6, 2006. In his inaugural speech, Rodriguez laid out an ambitious "first 100 days" agenda for change in the city, which included eliminating the transfer fee on the city's TransCab service (which offers taxi service to residents of remote areas of the city not served by Greater Sudbury Transit), and creating citizen committees to oversee a number of projects, including the implementation of Floyd Laughren's report on service improvements in the amalgamated city, reviewing the city's recreational facilities and pursuing the creation of an arts centre, revising the city's corporate taxation base, pursuing economic growth opportunities in the health care sector, and devolving some legislative authority to the existing local community action networks.

Rodriguez also ignited some controversy by making two unilateral decisions on his first day in office, reaffirming that stores in the city would not be permitted to open on Boxing Day and authorizing the Franco-Ontarian flag to be flown at Tom Davies Square. The latter decision invoked polarized opinion, with some praising the mayor for taking authoritative action and others criticizing him for isolating other cultural groups in the community.

Reynolds announced in December that she would be a candidate for the Liberal Party nomination for Nickel Belt in the next federal election, following Ray Bonin's announcement that he would retire from office at the end of the current parliamentary session. She later withdrew from the race, endorsing competitor Sylvain Beaudry; however, the nomination was ultimately won by Louise Portelance, who was also a defeated municipal council candidate in 2006.

Floyd Laughren tabled his committee report on January 10, 2007, making 34 recommendations for improvements in the city's municipal ward structure, communications, transportation, recreation and transit services. Rodriguez and most council members responded favourably to the report, indicating that they would attempt to implement as many of the recommendations as possible.
