= List of mayors of Sudbury, Ontario =

This is a list of mayors of Sudbury, Ontario, including the suburban communities that were amalgamated with Sudbury to create the city of Greater Sudbury on January 1, 2001.

== Town of Sudbury (1893–1930) ==
In Office	Mayor	Notes	Ref
1893	Stephen Fournier		
1894	Daniel O'Connor		
1895	Murray Biggar		
1896	Stephen Fournier		
1897-1898	Francis Cochrane		
1899-1901	Thomas J. Ryan		
1902	Francis Cochrane		
1903-1904	Francis Foley Lemieux		
1905-1907	Larry O'Connor		
1908-1909	John McLeod		
1910-1911	Larry O'Connor		
1912-1913	John G. Henry		
1914-1915	Larry O'Connor		
1916	Thomas Travers		
1917-1919	Percy Morrison		
1920-1921	J. Alfred Laberge	First mayor to have been born in the city.	
1922-1923	Robert H. Arthur		
1924-1925	Joseph Sutherland Gill		
1926-1927	Joseph A. Samson		
1928-1929	Charles Bibby		

== City of Sudbury (1930–2000) ==
In Office	Mayor	Notes	Ref
1930-1932	Peter Fenton		
1933-1934	W. Marr Brodie		
1935-1936	William J. Cullen		
1937-1938	John Rudd		
1939-1940	W. J. Forest		
1941-1951	William S. Beaton		
1952-1954	Dan Jessup		
1955-1956	Leo Landreville		
1957-1959	Joe Fabbro		
1960-1961	William R. Edgar		
1962-1963	William A. Ellis		
1964-1965	Joe Fabbro		
1966	Max Silverman		
1967	Grace Hartman		
1968-1975	Joe Fabbro		
1976-1981	Jim Gordon		
1981-1982	Maurice Lamoureux		
1982-1991	Peter Wong		
1991-2000	Jim Gordon		

== City of Greater Sudbury (2001–present) ==
In Office	Mayor	Notes	Ref
December 9, 2000 - November 30, 2003	Jim Gordon		
December 1, 2003 - November 30, 2006	David Courtemanche		
December 1, 2006 - November 30, 2010	John Rodriguez		
December 1, 2010 - November 30, 2014	Marianne Matichuk		
December 1, 2014 – November 14, 2022	Brian Bigger	First mayor to serve more than a single term since the municipal amalgamation of 2000.	
November 15, 2022 - present	Paul Lefebvre		

== Regional Municipality of Sudbury (1973–2000) ==
=== Capreol ===
(independent town 1918-1973, town within Regional Municipality of Sudbury 1973-2000)

- P. Kilgour 1927-1928
- B. M. Robinson 1931
- W. Gibson 1932-1935
- James E. Coyne 1936-1943
- W. Gibson 1944-1946
- Alistair MacLean 1947-1952
- W. Gibson 1953-1954
- Harold Prescott 1955-1969
- Norman Fawcett 1969-1973
- Harold Prescott 1973-1975
- Frank Mazzuca 1975-1997
- Dave Kilgour 1997-2000

=== Nickel Centre ===
- Mike Solski (1973–1979)
- Gary Lacey (1979–1982)
- Stan Hayduk (1982–1997)
- John Fera (1997–2000)

==== Coniston ====
(independent town 1934-1973)

- Edgar T. Austin (1934–1946)
- Roy Snitch (1947–1952)
- Walter Kilimnik (1953–1957)
- William Evershed (1958–1959)
- Maurice Beauchemin (1960–1962)
- Mike Solski (1963–1973) - Elected mayor of the new town of Nickel Centre on the amalgamation of the independent towns of Coniston, Garson, Wahnapitae, Falconbridge, and Skead.

==== Falconbridge ====
(independent town 1957–1973)

- John Franklin (1957–1973)

=== Onaping Falls ===
- Earl Gilchrist
- James Coady (1973–1983, mayor of Levack: 1964-1973)
- Robert Parker
- Shirley Mirka
- Jean Guy Quesnel

=== Rayside-Balfour ===
- Gilles Pelland (1972-1988)
- Lionel Lalonde (1988-2000)

=== Valley East ===
(Town, 1973–1997, City 1997-2000)

- Ray Plourde
- Howard Armstrong
- Jean-Yves 'John' Robert

=== Walden ===
- Tom Davies, 1973-1981
- Alex Fex, 1981-1982
- Charlie White, 1982-1991
- Terry Kett, 1991-1997
- Dick Johnstone, 1997-2000
