= Michael Solski =

Canadian politician (1918–1999)

Michael Solski (October 2, 1918 – October 19, 1999) was a Canadian union leader, politician, and author in the Canadian province of Ontario. He was president of the International Union of Mine, Mill, and Smelter Workers (Mine Mill) Local 598 from 1952 to 1959, at a time when it was the largest single local in Canada. He later served as the mayor of Coniston (1962–1972) and of Nickel Centre (1973–1978). At the end of his career, he was the target of a failed assassination attempt.

== Early life and union activism ==
Solski was born to a working-class family in Coniston and was raised in the community. In 1935, he began working at the same local Inco smelter that also employed his father and grandfather. From 1942 to 1944, he was chair of the Coniston Plant Union Organizing Committee that led to affiliation with Mine Mill. He was elected as a Coniston town councillor in 1945 and served until 1948.

== Break with the CCF ==
Solksi was a member of Sudbury's Co-operative Commonwealth Federation (CCF) Trade Union Committee in the 1940s, at a time when the local party organization was engaged in an extremely bitter dispute with the CCF's provincial leadership, who charged that Mine Mill in Sudbury was dominated by members of the rival Communist Party of Canada. This dispute took place against the backdrop of a rivalry between Mine Mill and the United Steelworkers of America for control of Local 598. The Steelworkers leadership was closely aligned with that of the CCF, and provincial Steelworkers leader Charles Millard was a very close political ally of CCF organizer David Lewis. (Ted Jolliffe, who served as Ontario CCF leader in this period, later remarked that the rivalry between Mine Mill and Steel, rather than charges of communist infiltration, was the real reason for the dispute.)

Solski left the CCF after Robert Carlin, the local Member of Provincial Parliament (MPP) and a Mine Mill stalwart, was denied renomination as a CCF candidate in the buildup to the 1948 provincial election. Carlin ran as an independent CCF candidate, and Solksi oversaw his campaign headquarters. The CCF fielded an official candidate against Carlin, resulting in a vote split and the election of a Progressive Conservative candidate. Solski remained a bitter opponent of the CCF and especially of David Lewis in the years that followed. (Despite their political alliance, Solski also disliked Carlin on a personal level. In the 1980s, he described Carlin as a "figurehead" union organizer who "never negotiated a goddammed contract in his life.")

== Local 598 leader ==
Solski became Local 598's vice-president in 1949 and was elected its president in 1952. Mine Mill's rivalry with the Steelworkers continued in full force during this period, and Solski had to fend off attempted raids on his membership. In what was presumably a bid to win the support of rank-and-file Steelworkers members, Solski actually pledged a significant amount of money for Steel in its battles against mine owners in Northern Ontario and Quebec during the early 1950s. Discussions over the manner of payment ended in acrimony, however, and ultimately no money was sent.

In September 1958, Local 598 conducted its first ever strike at Inco. Just before the strike, Solski held direct talks with Ontario premier Leslie Frost in a bid for a negotiated settlement. The job action was resolved four months later, after negotiations with provincial labour minister Charles Daley.

Solski was defeated in his 1959 bid for re-election by Donald Gillis, amidst a local backlash against Local 598's left-leaning leadership. Gillis was backed by the Steelworkers and favoured affiliation with the Canadian Labour Congress; he also accused Solski of mishandling the union's funds, a charge that Solski angrily denied.

Solski returned to an executive position with Mine Mill in 1960, winning election as the leader of its newly formed eastern district, which covered Ontario and Manitoba. He was a frequent rival to Gillis in this period, and at least one meeting of Local 598 ended in a violent confrontation between the rival camps. Several years later, it was revealed that Inco had hired former Nazis to disrupt the union's activities.

The Steelworkers won the right to represent Inco workers in 1962, and Solski reluctantly joined the rival union. He did not return to a position of leadership.

During his time as president of Local 598, Solski was regarded as an ally of Mine Mill's national and international leaders, many of whom were communists. He consistently denied accusations that he was himself a communist or was acting under the influence of the Communist Party. The author Cameron Smith has written that Local 598 was never under communist control and was large enough to act on its own accord, without recourse to Mine Mill's national or international leadership. During the 1980s, Solski said, "I was the president of the largest local in Canada [...] I could tell the international president to go to hell if I wanted to."

== Return to electoral politics ==
Solski was elected as the mayor of Coniston in 1962 and was re-elected three times. He also ran as a candidate of the Ontario Liberal Party in the 1967 provincial election, finishing third against New Democrat Party (NDP) candidate Elie Martel in Sudbury East. Solski's radical labour past was used against him in this election when NDP Member of Provincial Parliament (MPP) Ken Bryden described him as a "commie" during a legislative debate. In later years, Solski became a prominent local organizer for the Liberal Party of Canada.

Solski helped bring about Coniston's amalgamation into the new municipality of Nickel Centre in 1972, shortly after Inco shut down its Coniston factory. He was elected as Nickel Centre's first mayor and also became the first vice-chair of the Regional Municipality of Sudbury. Solski was re-elected as mayor in 1974 and 1976 before losing to Garry Lacey in 1978.

On November 15, 1978, Solski was shot by a disgruntled ratepayer, Romeo Karim, while attending his final council meeting. He eventually recovered, but suffered partial paralysis in one arm for the rest of his life. His shooter was found not guilty of attempted murder by reason of insanity.

== Later years ==
Solski chaired a group that published a work of pictorial history entitled The Coniston Story in 1983. The following year, he co-authored a book entitled Mine Mill: The History of the International Union of Mine, Mill and Smelter Workers in Canada since 1895.

Solski died of heart failure in 1999. At the time of his death, he was a member of the Coniston Hydro Electric Commission and the Sudbury Municipal Restructuring Association. The latter group lobbied for restructuring Sudbury into a single, one-tier government, a cause that Solski had long supported. He was also active with the Canada-Cuba Friendship Committee. In his last published editorial, Solski criticized the spending practices of Sudbury's municipal government and called on the provincial government to intervene.
