= Joe Cimino =

Canadian politician (born 1969)

Ontario MPP
- In office June 20, 2014 – November 20, 2014
- Preceded by: Rick Bartolucci
- Succeeded by: Glenn Thibeault
- Constituency: Sudbury

Sudbury Ward 1 Councillor
- In office 2006–2014
- Preceded by: Eldon Gainer; Gerry McIntaggart
- Succeeded by: Gerry McIntaggart

Personal details
- Born: 1969 (age 56–57)
- Party: New Democrat
- Spouse: Luisa
- Children: 2
- Education: Laurentian University; Nipissing University
- Profession: Elementary school teacher, city councillor

Giuseppe "Joe" Cimino (born c. 1969) is a former politician in Ontario, Canada. He was a New Democratic member of the Legislative Assembly of Ontario from June to November 2014. He resigned five months after being elected for health reasons. Prior to his provincial role he was a city councillor in the Greater Sudbury City Council from 2006 to 2014.

== Background ==
Cimino was born in Sudbury, and holds bachelor's degrees in political science from Laurentian University and education from Nipissing University. He worked as an elementary school teacher. Cimino and his wife Luisa live in Sudbury, Ontario with their two daughters.

== Politics ==
Cimino first ran for a seat on Greater Sudbury City Council in the 2000 municipal election, but was not elected; he ran a second time in the 2003 municipal election, and was again unsuccessful. He was elected in the 2006 municipal election, and served on council committees including the Greater Sudbury Housing Corporation board and the Greater Sudbury Public Library board.

While sitting as a city councillor, he won the New Democratic Party nomination for Sudbury on October 6, 2013, over the party's 2011 election candidate Paul Loewenberg. He took an unpaid leave of absence from his council seat once the 2014 provincial election was called. During the election campaign, he garnered some press across Ontario for his purported physical resemblance to controversial Toronto mayor Rob Ford.

On election day, he defeated Liberal candidate Andrew Olivier by 980 votes.

He was the party's critic for transportation issues, and had identified the continued freeway conversion of Highway 69, a project which had faced significant delays in recent years, as one of his key priorities.

On November 20, 2014, five months after his election, Cimino announced his resignation from the legislature citing the strain of being an MPP on his personal health as well as on his family. In a press release, Cimino stated: "I have been asked several times in the past how I was able to balance my public obligations as a city councillor with my family life....Even though it was difficult to do, I was able to be there for my young children, wife and extended family while still serving my community with complete dedication. Unfortunately the pendulum has swung too far to one side in the last several months. Simply, for my personal health wellness, and more importantly the well being of my family I must resign my seat in the Provincial Legislature." Following his resignation, he faced some controversy when it was revealed that he qualified for a $58,000 severance package, representing six months of an MPP's annual salary, but he announced that he would not accept the payout.

== Electoral record ==
2014 Ontario general election: Sudbury
Party	Candidate	Votes	%	±%
New Democratic	Joe Cimino	14,247	42.24	+1.51
Liberal	Andrew Olivier	13,267	39.34	−3.03
Progressive Conservative	Paula Peroni	4,653	13.80	+0.23
Green	Casey J. Lalonde	1,211	3.59	+0.91
Libertarian	Steven Wilson	242	0.72	
Independent	J. David Popescu	105	0.31	+0.17
Total valid votes		33,725	100.00	+4.03
New Democratic gain from Liberal		Swing		+2.27
Source(s) "General Election Results by District, 088 Sudbury". Elections Ontario. 2014.
