= Brian Bigger =

Canadian politician

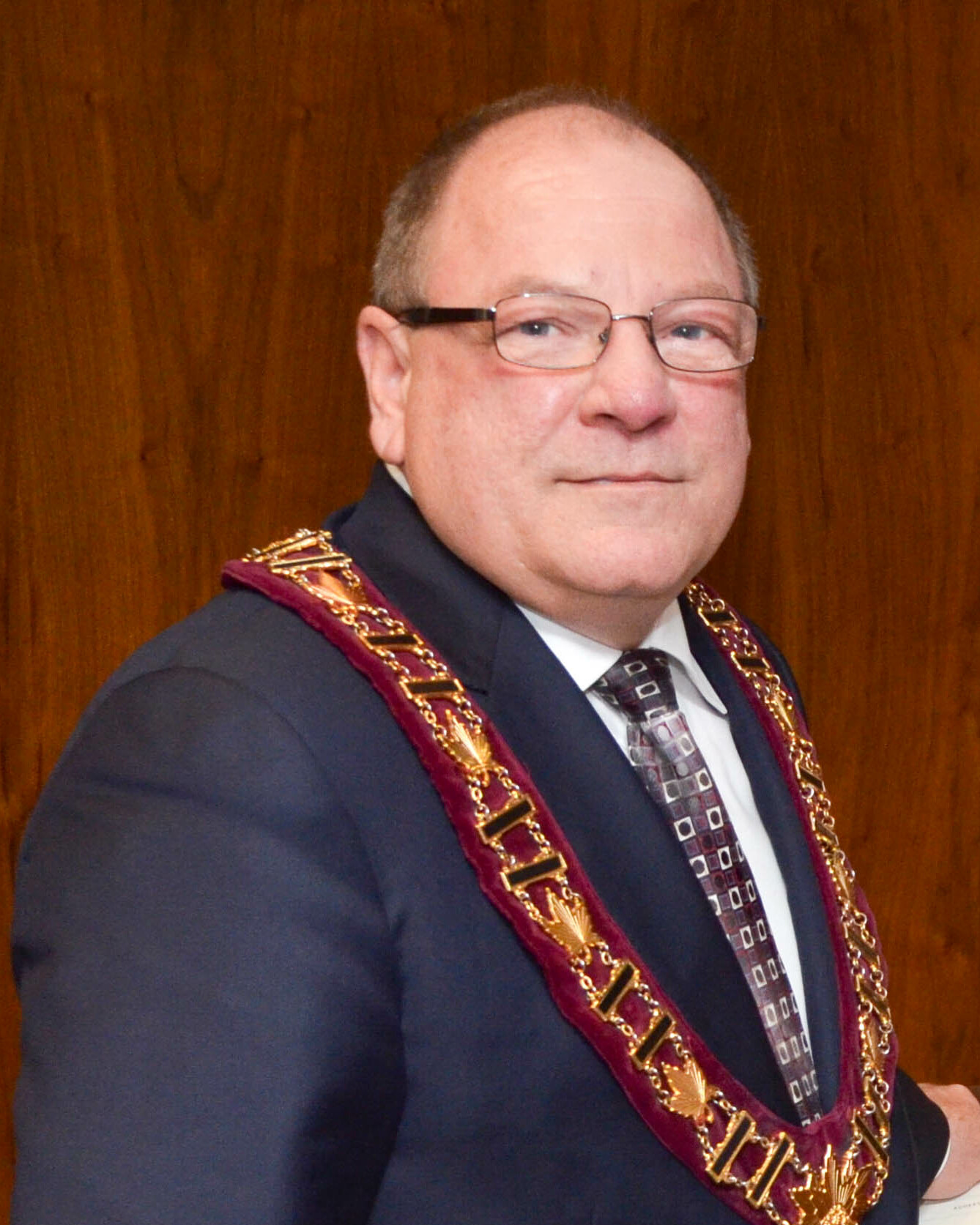
- Bigger in 2014

Mayor of Greater Sudbury
- In office December 1, 2014 – November 15, 2022
- Preceded by: Marianne Matichuk
- Succeeded by: Paul Lefebvre

Personal details
- Born: 1958 (age 67–68) Sudbury, Ontario, Canada
- Occupation: Accountant, auditor

Brian Bigger is a Canadian politician who served as the mayor of Greater Sudbury from 2014 to 2022. He was elected in the city's 2014 municipal election. Prior to serving as mayor, Bigger served as the first Auditor General for the city.

== Background ==
Born and raised in Sudbury, Bigger attended high school at St. Charles College, and studied marketing at Cambrian College and commerce at Laurentian University. He is a Chartered Professional Accountant, and worked as an accountant and auditor for Sears Canada and the Regional Municipality of Halton until he was appointed to a three-year term as the city of Greater Sudbury's auditor general in 2009.

As auditor general, he identified significant waste in the city's management of road maintenance, including scheduling inefficiencies and overbilling by outside contractors, as well as uncovering an illegal practice of paid shift trading taking place among employees of Greater Sudbury Transit.

In 2011, Greater Sudbury City Council held an in camera meeting about whether to renew Bigger's contract for a second three-year term; during the meetings, they took the unusual step of deciding to hire an outside auditor to audit Bigger's office. Bigger's contract was renewed, but several citizens of the city filed a complaint with the Ontario Ombudsman about the closed-door meetings. Ombudsman André Marin investigated the matter, ultimately finding that council was within its right to hold a closed meeting as it was a personnel matter involving a city employee, but criticized many of the councillors in his final report for refusing to cooperate with his investigation. As a result of Marin's report, city council voted to reject any oversight from the ombudsman's office.

== Politics ==
Bigger stated that by summer 2014, he was beginning to consider running for mayor to combat the obstruction he had faced in his role as auditor. In August, he requested a leave of absence from his job as auditor to launch a campaign for mayor. The request was granted. However, council then faced a further controversy when, rather than hiring or contracting a temporary auditor general to continue audit operations during Bigger's leave of absence, it simply suspended the office and reassigned Bigger's assistant, senior auditor Vasu Balakrishnan, to the finance department.

Bigger's campaign for mayor was based on a platform of openness, transparency and accountability. His campaign promises included identifying budget savings in order to deliver a zero property tax increase in his first year as mayor, reinstating the provincial ombudsman as the investigator of complaints about council activities, and implementing new ethics guidelines for city councillors and staff modelled on the Vaughan Accord implemented by Vaughan mayor Maurizio Bevilacqua in 2011.

On election day, Bigger garnered 46 per cent of the vote.

He was reelected to a second term in the 2018 municipal election, the first mayor to be re-elected to a second term in office since the municipal amalgamation of 2001.

In October 2022, he withdrew from the 2022 Greater Sudbury municipal election several weeks after having registered as a candidate, citing the need to spend more time with his family due to the declining health of his mother.
