= Valley East =

Coordinates: 46.66°N 80.98°W

Valley East Vallée-Est (French)
- Dissolved municipality (lower-tier)
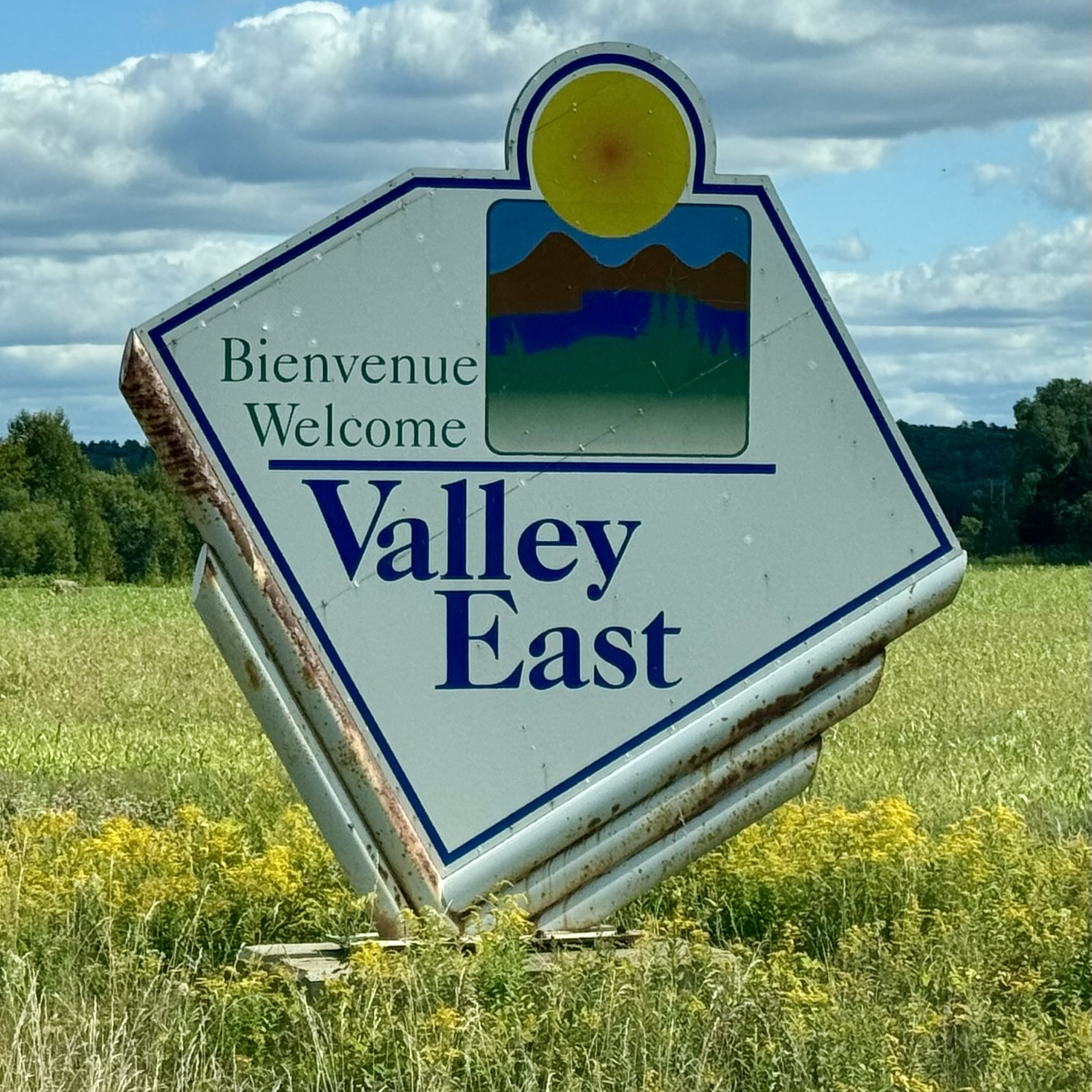

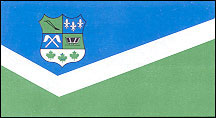
- Flag

- Location of Valley East (red) compared to the rest of the Sudbury Region until 2000.
- Country: Canada
- Province: Ontario
- City: Greater Sudbury
- Ward: 5, 6, 7
- Incorporated (Town): 1973
- Incorporated (City): 1997
- Dissolved: 2000

Government
  - City Councillors: Mike Parent, René Lapierre, Natalie Labbée
  - Governing Body: Greater Sudbury City Council
  - MPs: Jim Belanger (Conservative)
  - MPPs: France Gélinas (NDP)

Population (2021)Statistics Canada
  - Total: 17,251
- Time zone: UTC-5 (EST)
  - Summer (DST): UTC-4 (EDT)
- Postal Code FSA: P3N, P3P
- Area code: 705
- Website: Valley East Community Action Network

Valley East (Vallée-Est in French) is a district of the city of Greater Sudbury, Ontario, Canada.

First incorporated in 1973 as a separate town within the Regional Municipality of Sudbury, Valley East was so named because it comprised the eastern half of the Sudbury Basin. The largest of the six towns in the Regional Municipality, it was reincorporated as a city in 1997 due to continued population growth. On January 1, 2001, the city and the Regional Municipality were dissolved and amalgamated into the city of Greater Sudbury.

Before the amalgamation, Valley East was Northern Ontario's sixth-largest city, ranking after Timmins and before Kenora. According to the Canadian census of 2001, the last one that recorded Valley East as a separate entity, the city had a population of 22,374.

In the Canada 2011 Census, Valley East's main neighbourhoods were grouped as the population centre (or urban area) of Valley East, with a population of 20,676 and a population density of 368.9/km^{2}, although the boundaries of the urban area do not correspond to those of the former municipality.

Valley East is now divided between Wards 5, 6 and 7 on Greater Sudbury City Council, and is represented by councillors Mike Parent, René Lapierre, and Natalie Labbée.

== Education ==
Hanmer students: those in the English Catholic stream attend St-Anne School and Bishop Carter Catholic Secondary School. Those in the English public stream attend Redwood Acres Public School and Confederation Secondary School. Those in the French Catholic stream attend École Notre-Dame and École secondaire catholique l'Horizon. Those in the French public stream attend École publique Foyer-Jeunesse and École secondaire Hanmer; both of these schools are neighboured.

Val-Thérèse students: those in the English Catholic stream attend St-Anne School and Bishop Alexander Carter Catholic Secondary School. Those in the English public stream attend Redwood Acres Public School and Confederation Secondary School. Those in the French Catholic steam attend École St-Joseph Ste-Thérèse and École secondaire catholique l'Horizon those in the French public stream attend École publique Foyer-Jeunesse and École secondaire Hanmer; both of these schools are neighboured.

Val-Caron students: those in the English Catholic stream attend Immaculate Conception School and Bishop Alexander Carter Catholic Secondary School, those in the English public stream attend Valleyview Public School and Confederation Secondary School those in the French catholic stream attend École Jean-Paul II and École secondaire catholique l'Horizon. Those in the French public stream attend École publique de La Découverte and École secondaire Hanmer.

Blezard Valley students: those in the English Catholic stream attend Immaculate Conception School and Bishop Carter Catholic Secondary School. Those in the English public stream attend Valleyview School and Confederation Secondary School. Those in the French Catholic stream attend École Jean-Paul II and École secondaire catholique l'Horizon those in the French public stream attend École publique de La Découverte and École secondaire Hanmer.

== Valley East Days ==
Valley East Days is the largest Free Family Festival in Northern Ontario, and celebrated its 43rd year in 2018. This three-day long festival has included big musical acts, such as Trooper & Chilliwack in 2017. The festival typically attracts over 25,000 patrons.

== Notable people ==
- Rhéal Bélisle, Politician
- Ronald Duguay, NHL hockey player
- Andrew Brunette, Former NHL hockey player and current NHL coach
- Michelle O’Bonsawin, Supreme Court Justice
