= Municipal elections in Greater Sudbury =

Index of local elections

== Town of Sudbury 1893 - 1930 ==
1893 - 1899
1893	1894	1895	1896	1897	1898	1899

(1900–1929) The Town of Sudbury
1900s	1910s	1920s
1900	1910	1920
1901	1911	1921
1902	1902	1922
1903	1913	1923
1904	1914	1924
1905	1915	1925
1906	1916	1926
1907	1917	1927
1908	1918	1928
1909	1919	1929

== City of Sudbury 1930 - 2000 ==
(1930–2000) The City of Sudbury
1930s	1940s	1950s	1960s	1970s	1980s	1990s
1930	1940	1950	1960	1971	1981	1991
1931	1941	1951	1961	1971	1981	1991
1932	1942	1952	1963	1973	1983	1993
1933	1943	1953	1963	1973	1983	1993
1934	1944	1954	1965	1975	1985	1995
1935	1945	1955	1965	1975	1985	1995
1936	1946	1956	1967	1977	1987	1997
1937	1947	1957	1967	1977	1987	1997
1938	1948	1958	1969	1979	1989	1997
1939	1949	1959	1969	1979	1989	1997

== City of Greater Sudbury 2000 - Present ==
- 2000
- 2003
- 2006
- 2010
