= Canada–India relations =

- India: Canada

Diplomatic mission
- High Commission of India, Ottawa: High Commission of Canada, New Delhi

Envoy
- High Commissioner of India to Canada Dinesh K. Patnaik: High Commissioner of Canada to India Christopher Cooter

Canada and India established bilateral relations in the 19th century. Both are member nations of the Commonwealth of Nations and are part of G20, a group of world's largest economies. In 2023, bilateral trade between the countries was valued at $9.36 billion with the Indian exports to Canada worth $5.56 billion and Canadian exports to India valued at $3.80 billion.

Indian emigration to Canada started in the late 19th century. The Canadian Government established quotas initially but the immigration to Canada increased multi-fold in the 1970s and 1980s. Indian have become one of the largest immigrant populations in Canada. According to Immigration, Refugees and Citizenship Canada, of the more than 800,000 international students in Canada in 2022, 40 per cent were from India, constituting the largest international student group in Canada.

After the Indian Independence in 1947, the relation between the countries were furthered with Canada keen to act as a bridge between India and the Western World. The Canadian foreign aid to India started in 1951 and grew substantially under the Colombo Plan. Though there was a convergence of interest of both the countries in the 1950s, the views of the countries began to deviate in the 1960s. Canada reacted negatively after the Canadian-supplied nuclear reactor was used for India's first nuclear test in May 1974. The bombing of Air India Flight 182 in June 1985 and the events surrounding it, further led to misunderstandings between the two countries.

After the economic liberalisation policies of India in the 1990s, it attracted the Canadian government and the business community back to India. Bilateral visits by leaders of both countries furthered business deals and interests in other areas. However, the relationship was short lived, with Canada imposing further sanctions on India following India's second nuclear test in May 1998. The relations briefly recovered after the sanctions were lifted in 2001. The late 2000s and early 2010s saw a leap in the relationship between the countries, with the signing of Nuclear Cooperation Agreement in 2010 and other agreements.

While Canada and India have a broad-based relationship, their ties have often been strained by Sikh separatists in Canada who are affiliated with the Khalistan movement, calling for an independent Punjabi Sikh nation-state in India. Diplomatic tensions were triggered after the 2023 Sikh protests and Canadian allegations that India was involved in the assassination of Hardeep Singh Nijjar, a Khalistani activist alleged by India to have ties to militant organizations, in September 2023. India called back its High Commissioner and expelled Canadian diplomats and warned against travelling to the other country. The Indian government claimed that Canada has not provided any evidence, while Canada has contended that it was provided intelligence on the same by US intelligence agencies. After a brief thaw in the relationship, both the countries expelled six diplomats each in another stand-off in October 2024. Tensions have somewhat eased in 2025 after the Indian PM's visit to Canada for the 2025 G7 summit, following which the two sides agreed to reappoint high commissioners and engage in law enforcement to law enforcement dialogue to discuss a potential solution to the recent diplomatic situation.

== History ==
=== British Empire (19th century) ===
In the early 19th century, present-day Canada and India were part of the British Empire. The Indo-Canadian community was formed in the late 19th century due to the Indian emigration to Canada, majority of whom were Punjabis, which included veterans of the British Indian Army. When the British Crown took over India, Queen Victoria proclaimed that Indians would enjoy equal privileges across the British Empire without discrimination. The Indian emigrants settled mostly in the sparsely populated Western Canada and took up jobs such as law enforcement officers and lumberjacks. However, the race relations with white Canadians were strained as the legal and socioeconomic systems ensured racial discrimination and minimal direct contact by setting up various barriers. Though initially reluctant to go to these countries due to the racial discrimination, many young men chose to go upon the assurance that they would not meet the same fate in the early 20th century. Canadian Government quotas were established to cap the number of Indians allowed to immigrate to Canada in the early 20th century and only allowed fewer than 100 people from India a year until 1957, when it was marginally increased to 300 people a year.

=== Independent nations (1947–1950s) ===
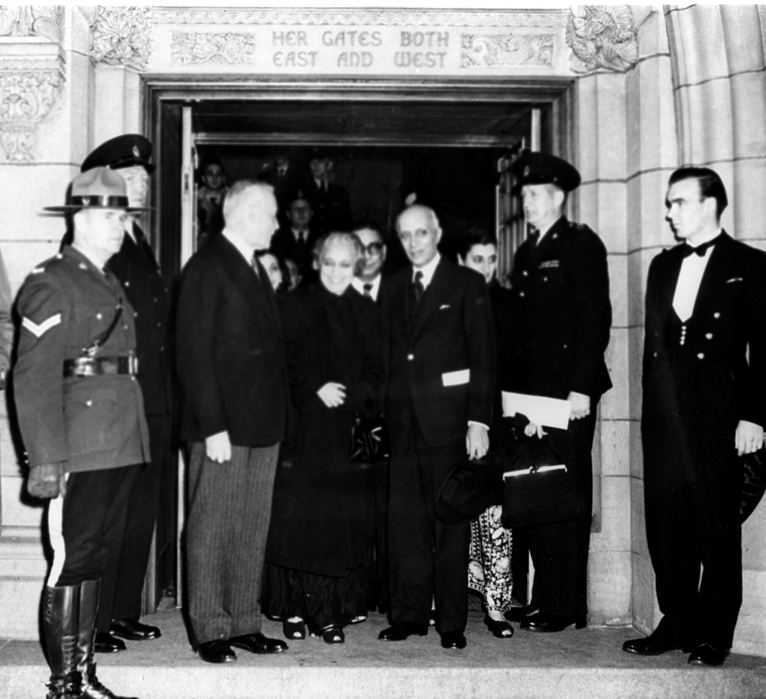
Indian prime minister Jawaharlal Nehru at the House of Commons of Canada after a joint-address to the Canadian parliament, 1949

After Indian Independence, the relations between the countries were furthered. Canada worked on creating an intercontinental group within the Commonwealth of Nations and was keen to act as a bridge between the newly independent Afro-Asian states and the Western World. India, being the world's largest democracy, became a key partner for Canada. The bilateral relationship was furthered by the personal relationship between Indian prime minister Jawaharlal Nehru and Canadian prime ministers Louis St. Laurent and Lester Pearson. Nehru addressed a joint session of the Canadian Parliament on 24 October 1949. The Canadian foreign aid to India started in 1951 and Canada started to provide aid for smaller projects in 1955–56, which grew substantially under the Colombo Plan. Canada supported the Kundah hydro-electric project and aero-surveys in Rajasthan and Uttar Pradesh. During the Cold War, though Canada was favourable towards the United States, it pursued an independent relation with India while the US aided Pakistan. As per Escott Reid, who was the high commissioner for Canada to India from 1953 to 1957, the countries had "a special relationship" during the 1950s.

=== Growing differences (1960s–1980s) ===
Though there was a convergence of interest of both the countries, the views of the countries on major events such as the Korean War, Suez Crisis and Soviet intervention in Hungary and Canada's position on the Kashmir conflict. Though both the countries pursued increased cooperation with the establishment of the Shastri Indo-Canadian Institute to promote academic relations in 1968 and the Canadian visit of Indian prime minister Indira Gandhi in June 1973, the relations soured further in the late 1970s. For India's first nuclear test in May 1974, the fissionable material for the nuclear device was synthesised with the Canadian-supplied CIRUS nuclear research reactor. Canada reacted negatively towards the same, especially in light of then ongoing negotiations on the Nuclear Non-Proliferation Treaty (NPT) and the economic aid it had provided to India. Canada concluded that the test violated a 1971 understanding between the two states, and froze nuclear energy assistance for the two heavy water reactors then under construction. It resolved to engage in nuclear cooperation only with countries which signed the Treaty on the NPT and the Comprehensive Nuclear-Test-Ban Treaty (CTBT), and which instituted full-scope safeguards on their nuclear energy programmes under the supervision of the International Atomic Energy Agency (IAEA). India had refused to sign the NPT, and voted against the UN General Assembly Resolutions which they assert violates its sovereign right to choose whether or not to sign such treaties. In the late 1970s, Canada focused on improving relations within the Western World while India pursued its own regional alliances.

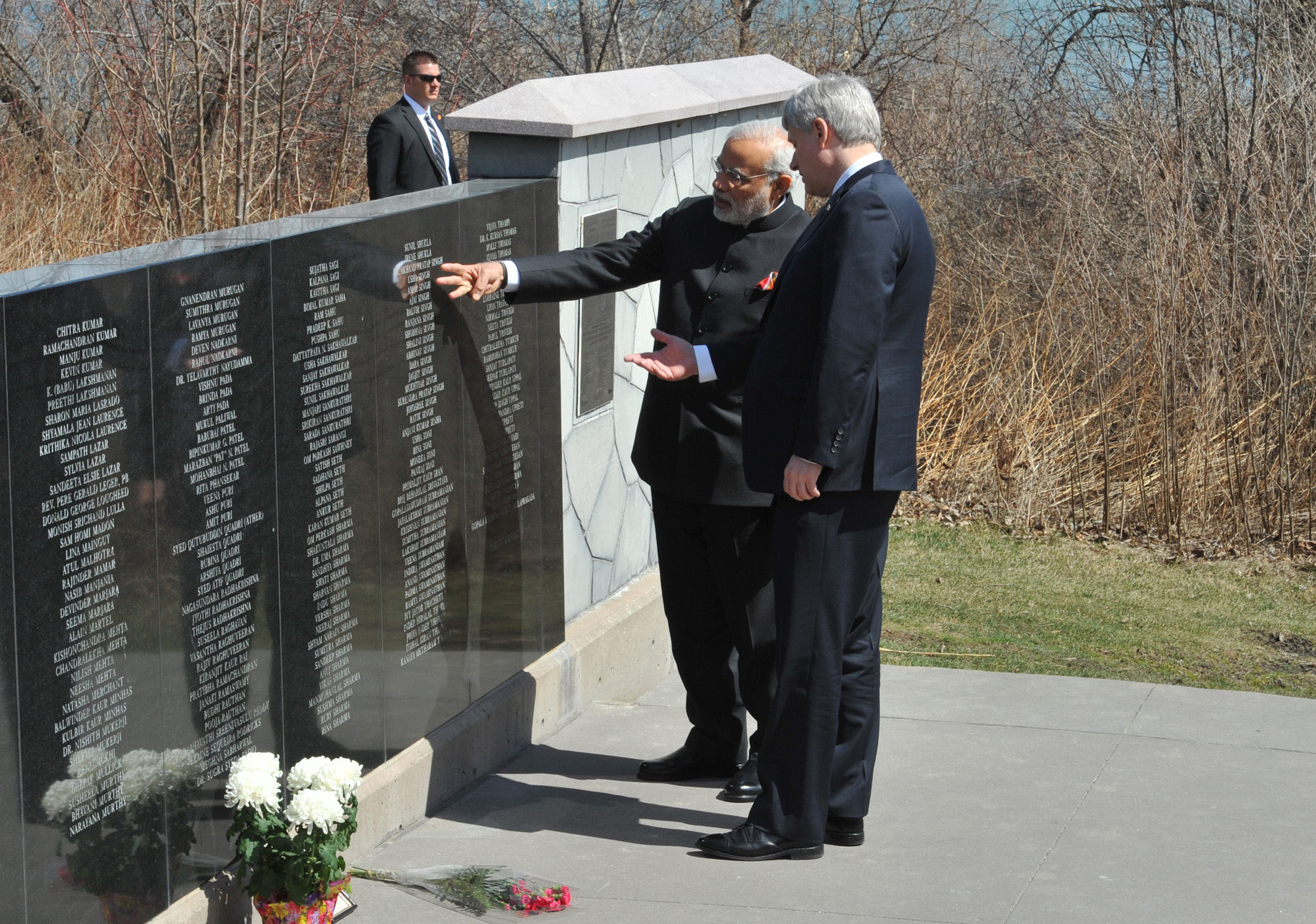
Canadian prime minister Stephen Harper and Indian prime minister Narendra Modi at a memorial for the Air India Flight 182 in Toronto, 2015

On 23 June 1985, Air India Flight 182 from Montreal to Mumbai, disintegrated over the Atlantic Ocean as a result of an explosion from a bomb planted by Canada-based Sikh terrorists and resulted in the deaths of 329 people. The Canadian government had been warned by the Indian R&AW about the possibility of terrorist attacks, and the Canadian Security Intelligence Service(CSIS) was accused of not acting on it. In his verdict, Justice Ian Josephson cited "unacceptable negligence" by CSIS when evidence on the suspects and other informants were destroyed. The Canadian prime minister Pierre Trudeau turned down Indian requests for extradition of the Canadian nationals suspected to be involved in the bombing.

Despite the differences between the countries, the Indian immigration continued in the 1970s and 1980s. South Asian population in Canada grew from 7,000 in 1961 to 67,900 in 1971 and more than 200,000 South Asians came to Canada between 1971 and 1982, majority of them being of Indian origin.

=== Brief recovery and further disagreements (1990s) ===
After the economic liberalisation policies of India in the 1990s, it attracted the Canadian government and the business community. After Jean Chrétien became the prime minister of Canada in 1993, it pursued renewed relations with India. In October 1994, Canadian minister Roy MacLaren visited India with a large trade delegation and proclaimed India to be "one of the most promising markets in the Asia-Pacific region for Canadian business." Bilateral visits by Chrétien along with a trade delegation in January 1996, a first by a Canadian prime minister in more than 25 years, and further visits by ministers of both the countries led to signing of business deals more than $3.4 billion and furthered the business interests. The two countries signed a Mutual Legal Assistance Treaty in 1994, which was operationalised in 1998 and the Indian Space Research Organisation and Canadian Space Agency signed two agreements in the field of exploration of outer space in October 1996. Canada and India agreed to a bilateral dialogue on combating terrorism, including the annual Canada-India Strategic Dialogue and the Canada-India working group on counter terrorism was established subsequently in 1997.

After India's second nuclear test in May 1998, Canada reacted negatively similar to its reaction to the earlier nuclear test. Canada suspended trade talks, recalled its envoy to India, paused weapon exports to India and opposed any non-humanitarian aid by the World Bank. Canadian foreign minister Lloyd Axworthy sought further sanctions on India and termed it as the "use the tools of soft power to demonstrate that security is better achieved through multilateral ventures than the attainment of nuclear capabilities". Canada refused to engage with India and discuss on the nuclear policies, while India remained committed to its nuclear policy. In 1998, India contributed to just 0.1% of Canada's exports and 0.3% of its imports. India's exports to Canada were only 1.6% of its total exports, and its imports from Canada were only 0.8% of its total imports. More than $3 billion worth of economic projects stagnated, and Canada ranked low amongst the foreign investors in India, with only a 1.4% share.

=== Harper era ===
Axworthy's successor John Manley, who had personal connections with India, viewed India as a major partner and removed most of the Canadian sanctions in 2001. With further visits by ministers of both countries, it was agreed between the leaders of both the countries to triple the existing trade. But the rise of terrorist attacks which occupied Canada's attention, the view of Manley's successor Bill Graham, who viewed trade with Africa and Latin America as priority, meant that the relationship did not progress much further.

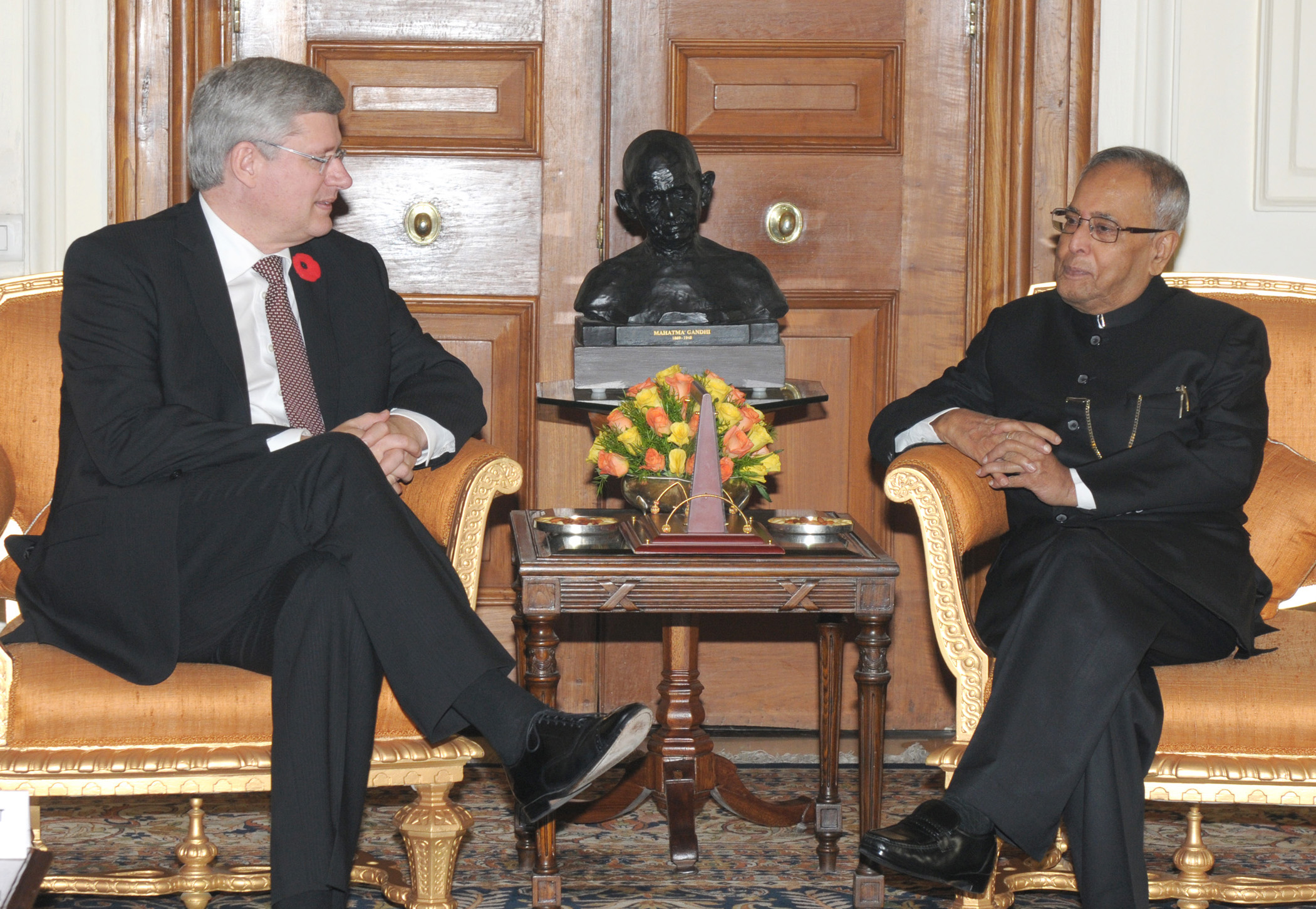
Canadian prime minister Stephen Harper with Indian President Pranab Mukherjee during Harper's visit to India in 2012.

After Stephen Harper became the prime minister of Canada, Canada sought to increase its ties with India. Twenty Canadian ministers visited India in the late 2000s including an official visit by Prime Minister Harper in November 2009. Indian prime minister Manmohan Singh visited Canada in June 2010, the first visit by an Indian prime minister to Canada since 1973. Both the countries sought to expand the bilateral relations across various sectors including education, energy, science and technology, culture, agriculture and the environment and multiple agreement on social security, foreign investment and economic partnership were agreed. The year 2011 was designated as the "Year of India in Canada" by both the governments.

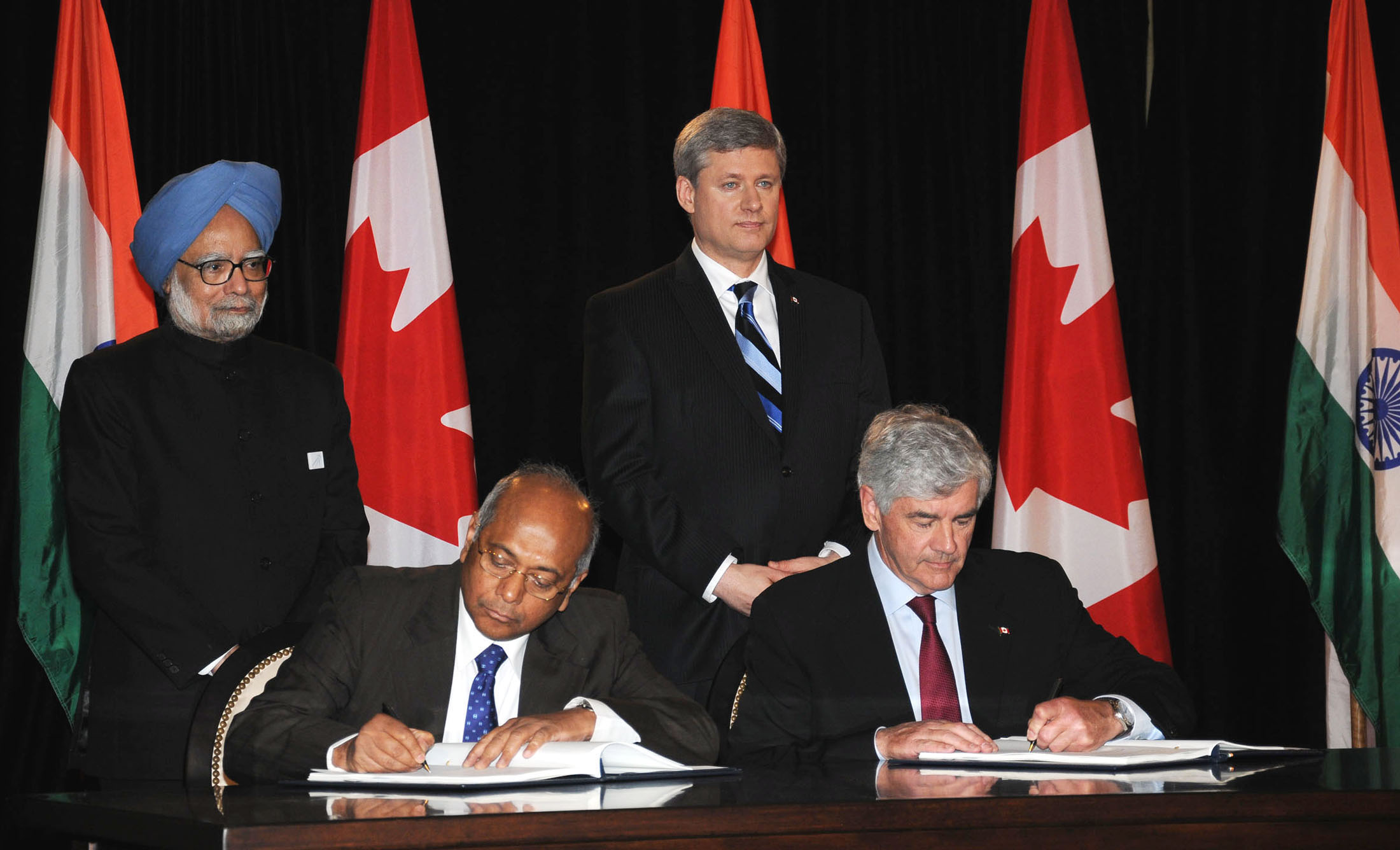
Signing of the India-Canada nuclear agreement in 2010.

In 2010, the Nuclear Cooperation Agreement was signed between the two countries, which was followed by a renewed agreement in 2015 to supply 3000 metric tons of Uranium concentrate to India under a five-year contract. The bilateral trade increased to $4.2 billion in 2010, a 46% increase from 2005. The foreign direct investment between Canada and India reached $3.6 billion of which nearly $3.0 billion were Canadian investments in India. More than 100 bilateral agreements were signed between Canadian and Indian institutes and nearly 12,000 students travelled to Canada for higher education in 2011.

=== Trudeau premiership (2015-2025) ===
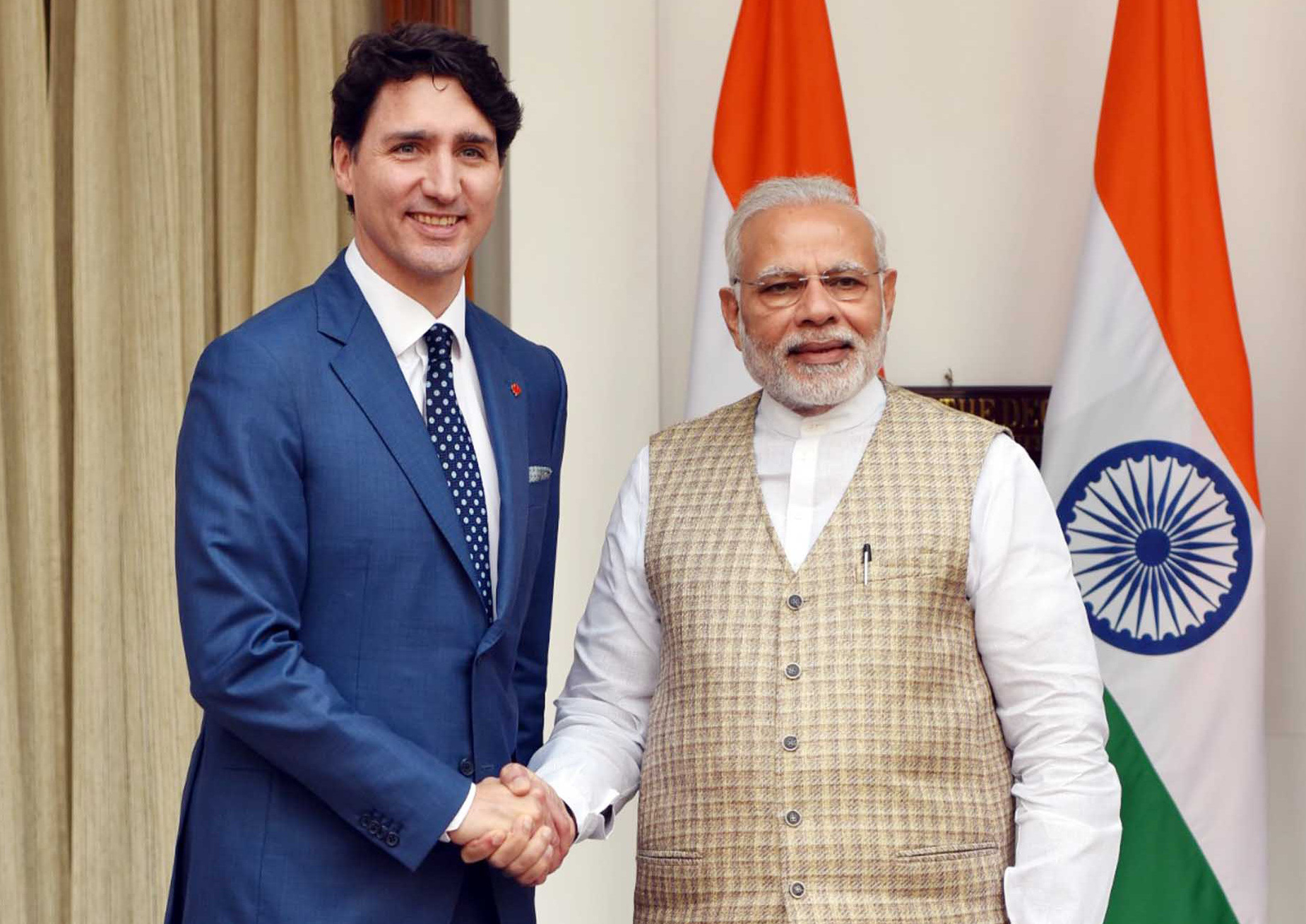
Canadian prime minister Justin Trudeau with Indian prime minister Narendra Modi during Trudeau's official visit to India in 2018.

Justin Trudeau became the Canadian prime minister in 2015. He spent a week in India on a state visit in February 2018. A new agreement on education was signed and the India-Canada Consular Dialogue was established to sort diplomatic issues between the nations. Further agreements were signed in areas such as sport, information and communication technology, science and innovation and civil nuclear cooperation. During Trudeau's visit, he participated in a function in which Jaspal Atwal, a convict in the attempted murder of then Punjab minister Malkiat Singh Sidhu in 1986, also took part and drew criticism in India.

In 2019, Canada's Public Safety Department identified Sikh extremism as one of the country's top terror threats, which was however omitted from further reports following protests from some of the Sikh community. Canada has the largest Sikh population outside India and Sikhs account for nearly 2 per cent of Canada's population. Omer Aziz, a former foreign policy advisor in the Trudeau government, claimed that the Sikh voting bloc influenced the government's policy making decisions and cited it as a reason why Canada ignored India's demands to crack down on financing from Khalistan supporters. The Indian government criticised the move and Chief Minister of Punjab Amarinder Singh claimed that Trudeau "succumbed to domestic political pressure" and that the move was a threat to global security.

In December 2020, Trudeau expressed concerns about the handling of farmer protests by the Indian government. He stated that "Canada will always be there to defend the rights of peaceful protestors" and expressed support for "the process of dialogue." India protested against the remarks and the Indian Ministry of External Affairs stated that Trudeau's comments were "an unacceptable interference in our internal affairs".

According to Immigration, Refugees and Citizenship Canada (IRCC) data, of the more than 800,000 international students in Canada in 2022, 40% were from India, constituting the largest international student group in Canada.

India has, in recent times, accused Canada of sponsoring gang warfare, drugs trafficking, and extortion in India, which they believe sustains the Khalistan militant movement. Ex-Canadian PM Stephen Harper said that Canada should stop cultivating divisive groups like pro-Khalistani elements.

==== Diplomatic row (2023–2025) ====
The Canada–India diplomatic row was a diplomatic dispute between Canada and India that started in September 2023, with periodic escalation throughout the following year. While the diplomatic row was initially triggered due to Canadian Prime Minister Justin Trudeau's allegations that the Indian government was involved in the assassination of the militant Hardeep Singh Nijjar, the ongoing tensions between India and Canada have been largely fuelled by disagreements over the Sikh separatist and militant Khalistan movement and its active supporters.

This led to a prolonged diplomatic stand-off between the countries. Both the countries expelled diplomatic staff, claiming interference in the other's internal affairs.

In 2023, both countries expelled members of each other's diplomatic staff and advised their citizens against traveling to the other; Canada closed three consulates in India. In October 2024, Canada expelled Sanjay Kumar Verma, the Indian High Commissioner to Canada, along with five other diplomats. India retaliated with six expulsions of its own.

Leaders of various nations released statements expressing concern on the stand-off. However, under Prime Minister Mark Carney, relations have improved and the two countries have restored diplomatic relations since 2025.

=== Carney premiership (2025–present) ===
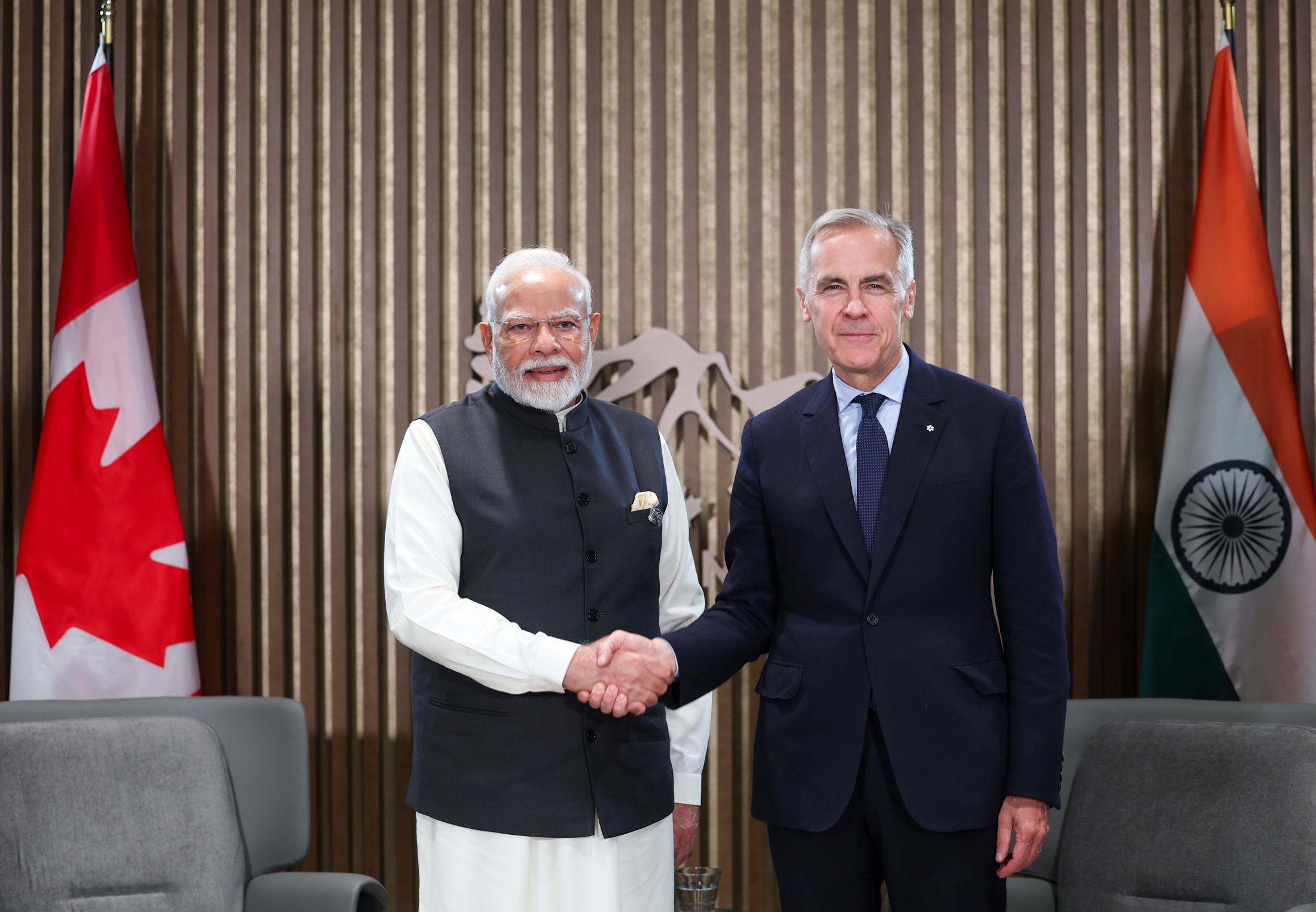
Indian Prime Minister Narendra Modi with Canadian Prime Minister Mark Carney on 17 June 2025

On 17 June 2025, during the 51st G7 summit in Kananaskis, Alberta, Canadian prime minister Mark Carney met with Indian prime minister Narendra Modi to reaffirm the two countries' ties. At the summit, which Carney called a “great honor” to host Indian prime minister Narendra Modi, both leaders emphasised shared goals in clean energy, AI, and counterterrorism. Modi called for “win-win cooperation,” and India's foreign ministry confirmed plans to revive free trade talks and resume high-level engagement. During the 2020s, extortion-related crimes rose in Canada, primarily impacting South Asian communities.

On 23 June 2025, Canadian prime minister Mark Carney issued a statement commemorating the 40th anniversary of the Air India Flight 182 bombing, calling it the "deadliest attack in our country’s history." The 1985 tragedy, in which 329 people—most of them Canadians of Indian origin—were killed in a bombing carried out by Sikh extremists based in Canada with links to Babbar Khalsa, was highlighted as a sombre reminder of the enduring impact of terrorism. In August 2025, both nations appointed new envoys. In June 2025, David Eby, the Premier of British Columbia, asked Prime Minister Mark Carney to list the Lawrence Bishnoi gang as a designated terrorist group. Later that year, an RCMP report on the Lawrence Bishnoi gang assessed that it had been "acting on behalf of the Indian government" and that its criminal enterprise in Canada was growing. In September 2025, the government listed the gang as a terrorist entity. On 23 February 2026, the Government of Canada stated that it would revoke Tahawwur Hussain Rana's Canadian citizenship; Rana was implicated in the 2008 Mumbai attacks. The reason was not attributed to charges of terrorism, but that Rana had falsely declared to have lived in Ottawa and Toronto for 4 years before applying for Canadian citizenship in the year 2000. The RCMP had investigated that Rana spent nearly all that time in Chicago, where he owned several businesses and properties.

Carney made a state visit to New Delhi and Mumbai in early 2026, where he met with Indian officials, including Modi; the two nations signed multiple MOUs worth billions of dollars, relating to energy, minerals, pharmaceuticals, academics, and more. In addition, in February 2026, a senior Canadian official told the Toronto Star that India was no longer linked to violent crime in Canada, a claim disputed by others. This claim was later affirmed by RCMP commissioner Michael Duheme in March.

== Immigration to Canada ==
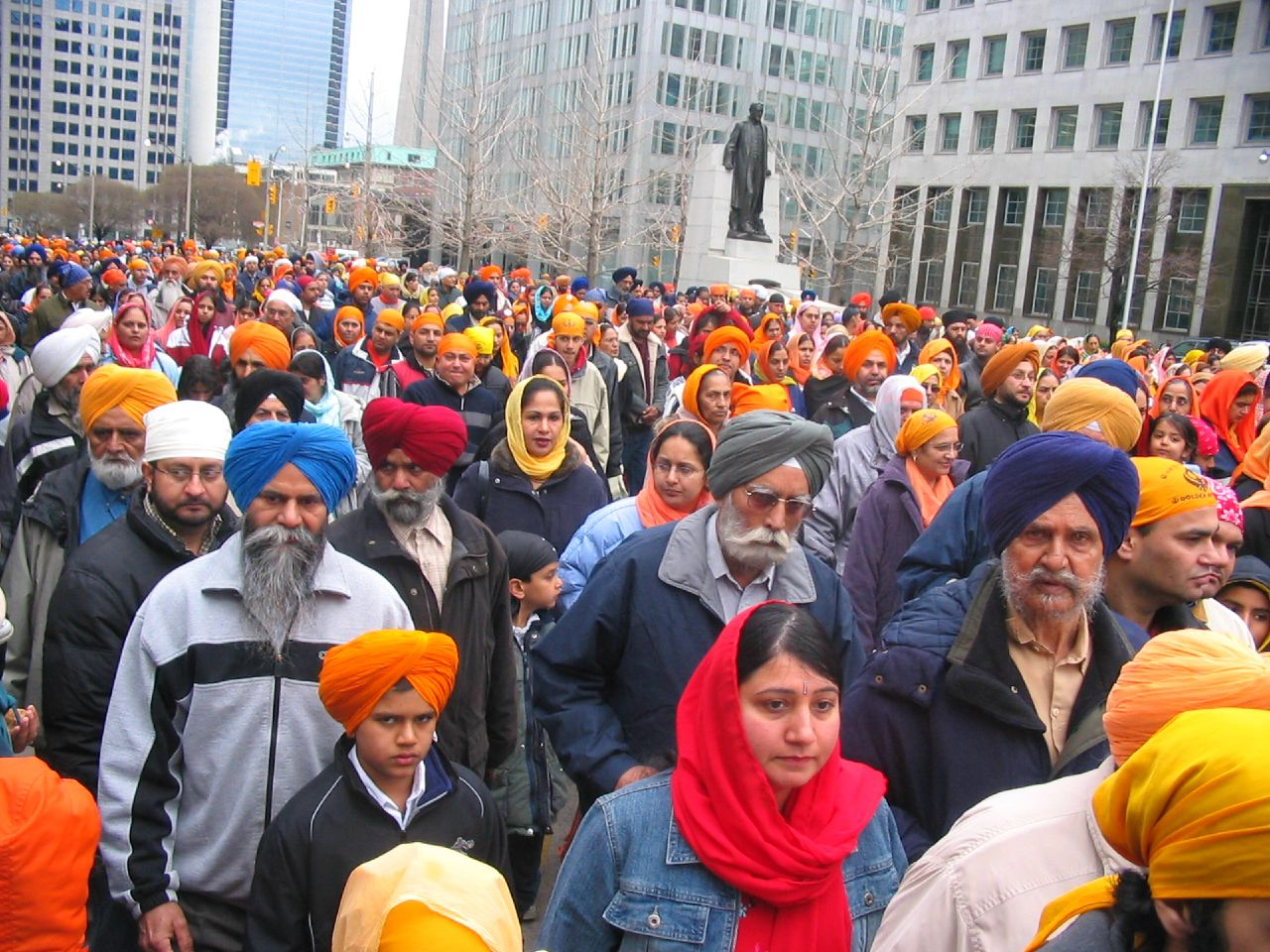
Sikhs celebrating the Sikh new year in Toronto

India is one of the largest source countries for immigrants to Canada, particularly for permanent residents, temporary foreign workers, and international students. India is the leading source of permanent residency admissions to Canada. India's share of total admissions grew from 4.96 percent in 1990 to a peak of 31.5 percent in 2021, and stabilized at approximately 25 percent by the mid-2020s. This shift was facilitated by Canada's merit-based points system, a large English-proficient applicant pool, and the implementation of the Express Entry selection process in 2015.In 2023, Canada admitted 139,715 new permanent residents from India.

As of 2021, the Indo-Canadian population numbers approximately 1.86 million. Sikhism is the fourth-largest religion in Canada, with nearly 800,000 adherents, or 2.1% of Canada's population, as of 2021.

== Cultural relations ==
=== Sports ===
Cricket and kabaddi, which are popular in India, have grown in Canada partially due to migration, with the Canadian Minister of State for Sport, Bal Gosal, saying in 2012 that the two countries would collaborate on further growing ties in sports. However, worsening ties in later years saw Canada pre-emptively pull its team out of the 2025 Kho Kho World Cup.

== Resident diplomatic missions ==
of Canada in India

- New Delhi (High Commission)
- Bengaluru (Consulate-General)
- Chandigarh (Consulate-General)
- Mumbai (Consulate-General)

of India in Canada

- Ottawa (High Commission)
- Toronto (Consulate-General)
- Vancouver (Consulate-General)

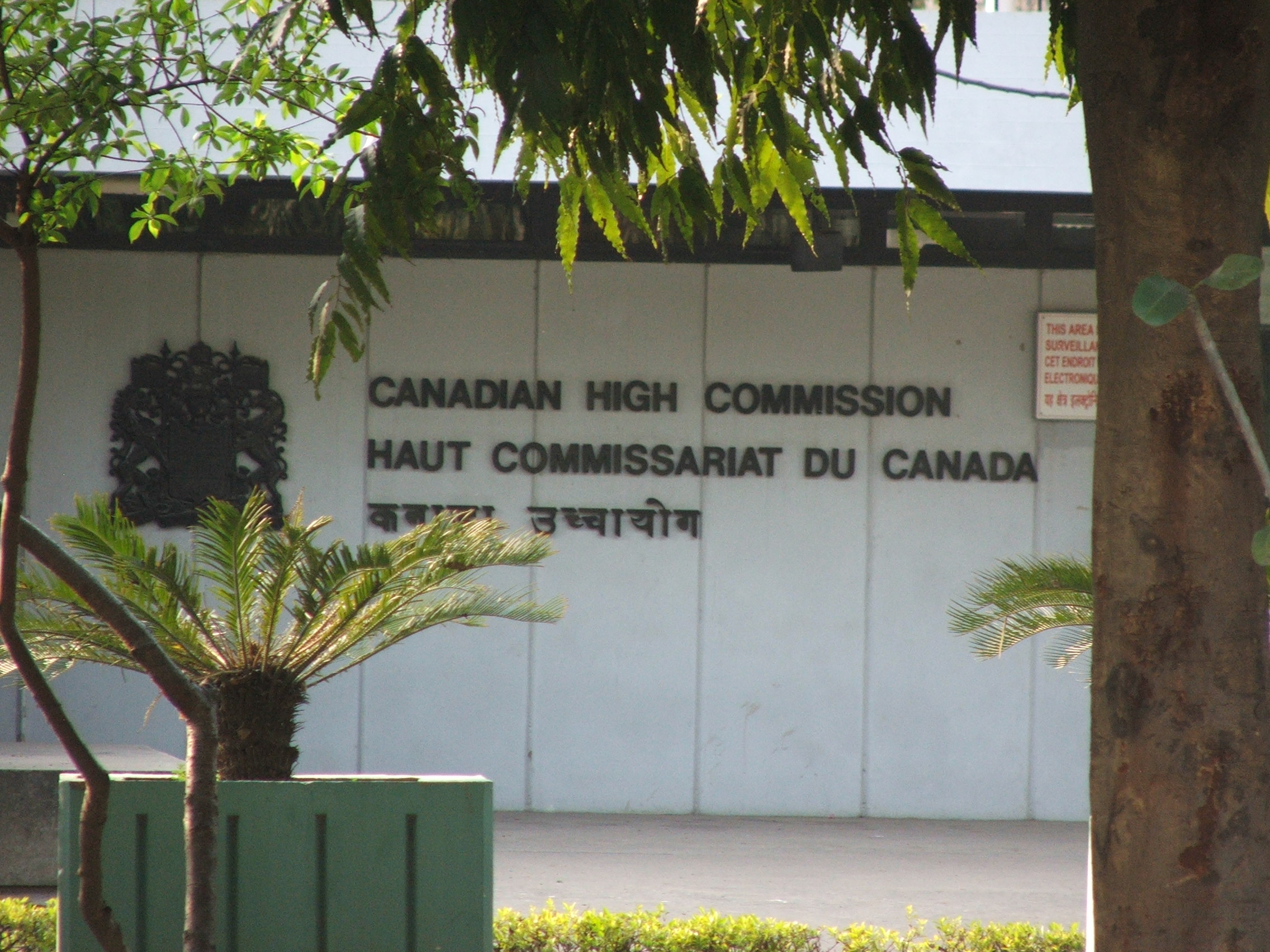
High Commission of Canada in New Delhi

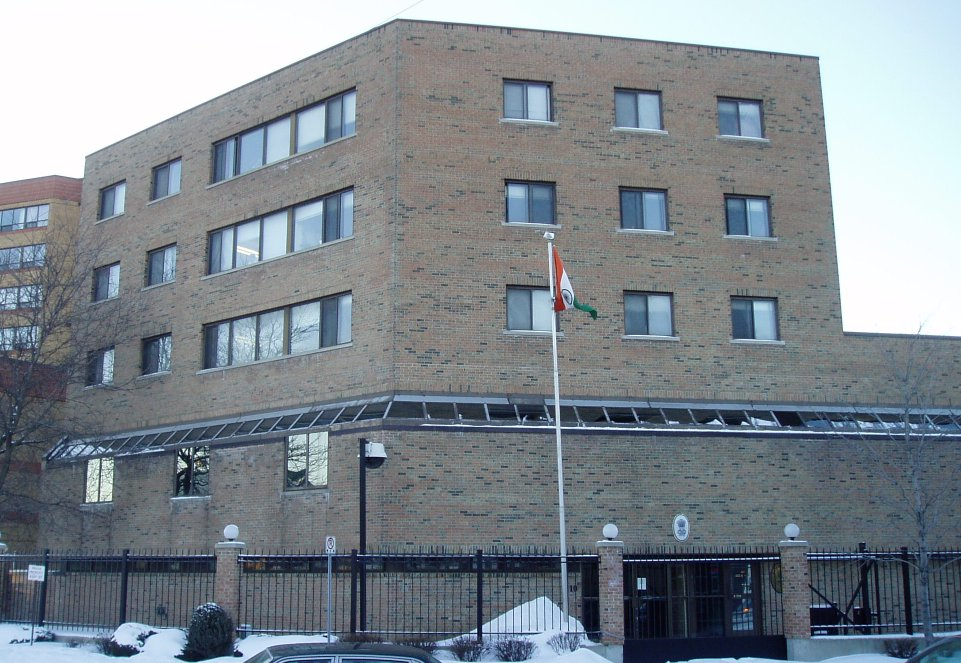
High Commission of India in Ottawa

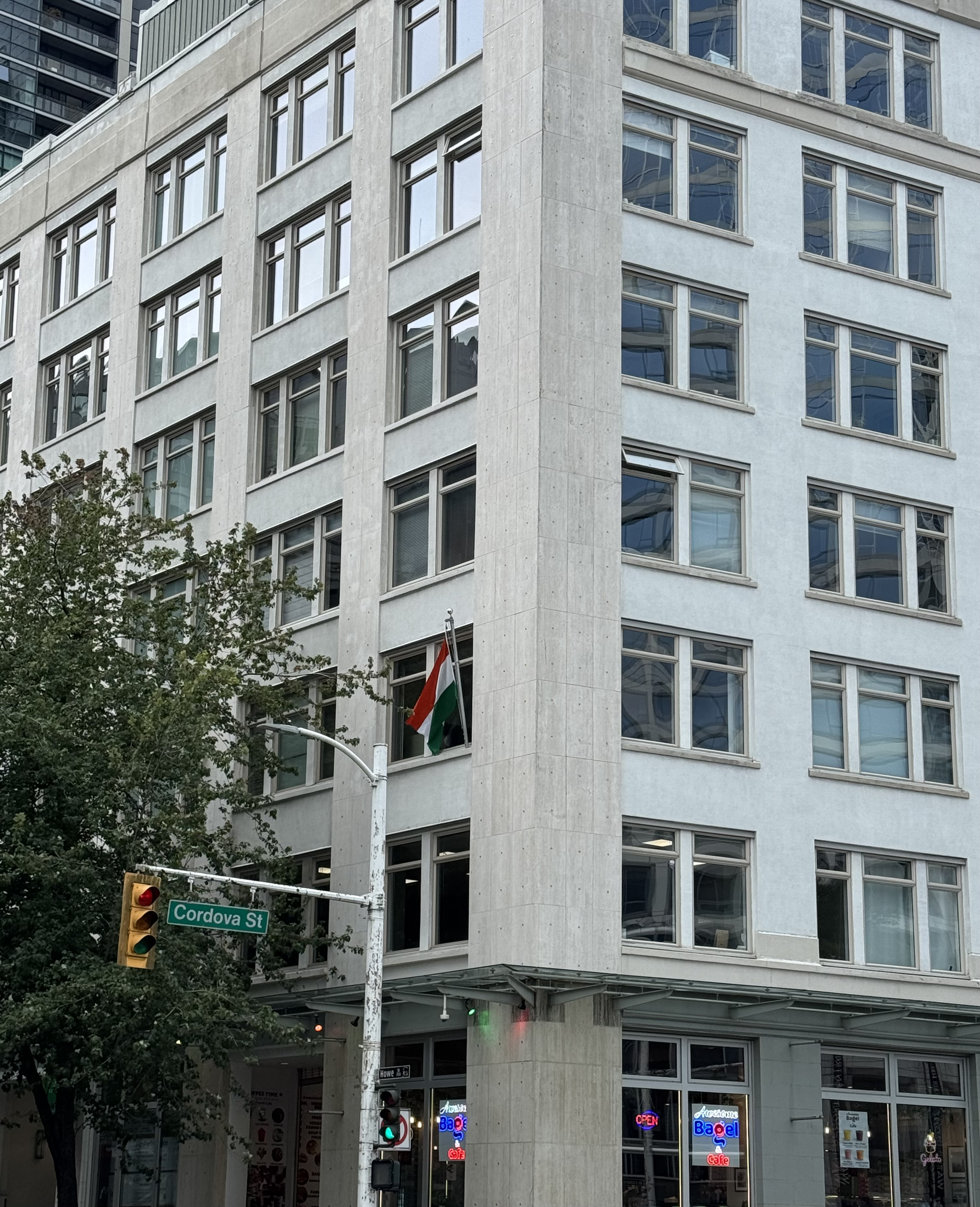
Consulate-General of India in Vancouver

== Trade ==
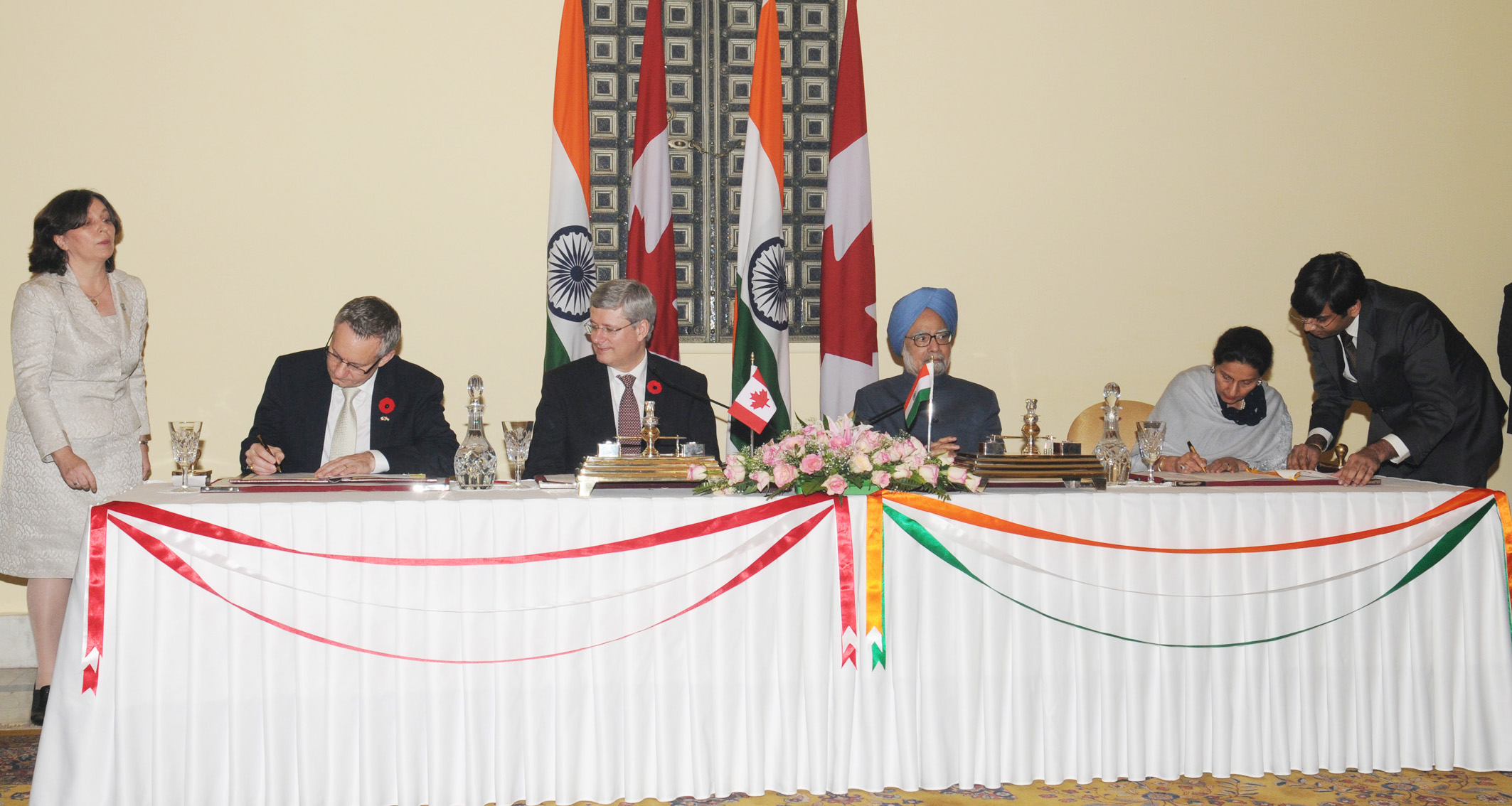
Preneet Kaur (right), the Indian Minister of State for External Affairs signs a MoU with Ed Fast (left), the Canadian Minister of International Trade in the presence of the Prime Ministers of both the countries in 2012.

In 2023, bilateral trade between India and Canada was valued at $9.36 billion with the Indian exports to Canada worth $5.56 billion and Canadian exports to India valued at $3.80 billion. In July 2024, India accounted for 0.74% ($0.74 billion) of Canada's total trade of $99.04 billion and Canada accounted for 0.82% of India's total trade of $90.14 billion. The major Indian exports included pharmaceuticals, telephones, automobile parts, sea food, electrical components, and jewellery, while Canada's main exports included coal briquettes, wood pulp, iron ore, legumes, and paper. The countries held discussions on a Comprehensive Economic Partnership Agreement in the 2010s and the volume of trade between the two countries has grown steadily over the last decade.

Merchandise trade between India and Canada (2022)
Canadian exports			Indian exports		
Merchandise	Value ($ billion)	%	Merchandise	Value ($ billion)	%
Mineral fuel and oils	1.12	26.2	Chemicals and Pharmaceuticals	0.91	16.9
Fertilizer	0.77	17.8	Textiles	0.75	13.9
Paper	0.65	15.1	Machineries and electronics	0.68	12.6
Food products	0.31	7.1	Iron and steel	0.62	11.7
Aircraft	0.24	5.5	Jewellery	0.36	6.5
Iron and steel	0.23	5.3	Automobile parts	0.30	5.6
Others	1.75	41.0	Others	1.75	32.5
Total	4.32	100%	Total	5.37	100%

== Air connectivity ==
As of 2024, Air Canada operates non-stop flights from Toronto, Montreal, and Vancouver to Delhi, and from Toronto to Mumbai. In September 2019, Air India resumed its non-stop flights from Delhi to Toronto, and began scheduled flights from Delhi to Vancouver in October 2020. In May 2022, Indian aviation minister Jyotiraditya Scindia met with Canadian Transport Minister Omar Alghabra to discuss an open skies treaty, which would allow unlimited flights between the two countries.

== See also ==
- Indo-Canadians
