= 1950 Sudbury municipal election =

The 1950 Sudbury municipal election was held on December 4, 1950, as voters in Sudbury, Ontario, and its outlying communities voted to elect mayors, alderman, school trustees, the hydro commissioner and the reeve of McKim Township. In addition the voters were asked to decide on three propositions, whether to allow Sunday sport, ash collection and a two-year term for municipal elections.

At this time the city was divided into three wards; Fournier, McCormick and Ryan. Three aldermen were elected for each ward. They were selected by choosing the top three contestants with the highest number of recorded ballots (i.e those contestants who place first, second and third).

The municipal election of 1950 represented the start of a key shift in the demographic of city council. It was in this election that citizens of Sudbury elected two women to serve as alderman for the first time in the city’s history. They were Grace Hartman, who would later become the city's first woman mayor, and Dr. Faustina Kelly Cook.

On an interesting side note, William S. Beaton, the incumbent, ran against Peter Fenton, the mayor of Sudbury from 1930 to 1932.

== Results ==
The results are taken from the December 5, 1950, edition of the Sudbury Daily Star.

City of Sudbury Election Results, 1950
Mayoral Contest
Candidate	Votes				
Candidate	Adv. Polls	Fournier Ward	McCormick Ward	Ryan Ward	Total
BEATON (elected)	15	718	1579	2009	4321
Whissell	11	1705	748	1176	3640
Fenton	14	269	719	869	1871

Aldermanic Contest
Fournier Ward		McCormick Ward		Ryan Ward	
Candidate	Votes	Candidate	Votes	Candidate	Votes
LAMOUREUX (elected)	1944	HARTMAN (elected)	2238	THOMPSON (elected)	2568
COOK (elected)	1434	BARLOW (elected)	1867	COE (elected)	1916
GODIN (elected)	1010	MONAGHAN (elected)	1219	ANDERSON (elected)	1553
Campeau	843	Furchner	1148	McNeill	1442
Theriault	748	O’Neil	529	Germa	1264
Theriault	748	Cler	308	Nesbit	673

Plebiscites
Sunday Sport
Decision	Votes				
Decision	Adv. Polls	Fournier Ward	McCormick Ward	Ryan Ward	Total
NO (decided)	22	1578	2117	2637	6354
Yes	19	976	858	1264	3117
Two Year Term
Decision	Votes				
Decision	Adv. Polls	Fournier Ward	McCormick Ward	Ryan Ward	Total
NO (decided)	35	1742	2429	2998	7204
Yes	5	594	620	788	2007
Ash Collection
Decision	Votes				
Decision	Adv. Polls	Fournier Ward	McCormick Ward	Ryan Ward	Total
NO (decided)	29	1846	2002	2814	6691
Yes	12	637	838	1023	2510
Hydro Commission
Candidate	Votes				
Candidate	Adv. Polls	Fournier Ward	McCormick Ward	Ryan Ward	Total
LANDREVILLE (elected)	21	2180	1283	1946	5439
Dash	20	442	1728	1961	4151
McKim Township
for Reeve
Candidate	Votes				
Candidate	Gatchel	New Sudbury	Minnow Lake	Lockerby	Total
SOMERS, M.E. (elected)	187	315	866	212	1580
Miller, Geo. F.	723	156	192	368	1439
