= 1965 Sudbury municipal election =

Election in Sudbury, Ontario

The 1965 Sudbury Municipal election was held on December 6, 1965. Max Silverman was elected Mayor of the City of Sudbury.

The candidates elected to Sudbury City Council were:

Sudbury City Council 1966
Ward 1	Ward 2	Ward 3	Ward 4	Ward 5	Ward 6
Andy Roy	Jack Raftis	Gerry Blais	Bill Baby	Bud Germa	James Jerome
Robert Desmarais	Maurice Lamoureux	Alphège Theriault	Bill Edgar	Gervis Waddell	Carl Nurmi

== 1965 Election results ==
The results of the 1965 municipal election were reported by the Sudbury Star on December 7, 1965. The results are listed below:

City of Sudbury Election Results, 1965
Mayoral Contest
Candidate	Votes						
Candidate	Ward 1	Ward 2	Ward 3	Ward 4	Ward 5	Ward 6	Total
Max Silverman (elected)	1957	1645	1296	1962	1411	1890	10161
Joe Fabbro	1068	1253	1075	1845	1561	1465	8267
Ernie Proulx	735	494	752	365	183	313	2842

Board of Control
Candidate	Votes						
Candidate	Ward 1	Ward 2	Ward 3	Ward 4	Ward 5	Ward 6	Total
Grace Hartman (elected)	1962	1907	1457	2294	1698	2242	11560
Neil Birney (elected)	1781	2047	1051	1967	1727	2300	10873
Jim Cormack (elected)	1884	1754	1267	2048	1569	2061	10583
Bill Ellis (elected)	1990	1781	1074	1775	1419	1685	9724
Hector McDonald	1554	1553	1155	1990	1195	1498	8945
Bob Keir	1343	1410	913	1626	1500	1568	8360
Ernie Savard	1425	1227	1586	1174	877	1023	7312

Aldermanic Contest
Ward 1		Ward 2		Ward 3		Ward 4		Ward 5		Ward 6	
Candidate	Votes	Candidate	Votes	Candidate	Votes	Candidate	Votes	Candidate	Votes	Candidate	Votes
Andy Roy (elected)	2715	Jack Raftis (elected)	2463	Gerry Blais (elected)	1436	Bill Baby (elected)	2546	Bud Germa (elected)	2372	James Jerome (elected)	1969
Robert Desmarais (elected)	1849	Maurice Lamoureux (elected)	2316	Alphège Thériault (elected)	1223	Bill Edgar (elected)	2409	Gervis Waddell (elected)	1732	Carl Nurmi (elected)	1893
Les McDonald	1019	Kenneth Hoop	1327	Maurice Henri	949	James Blake	1135	Bruce Kerr	1103	Tony DeMarco	1474
Terry Stewart	834	Kenneth Hoop	1327	Vic Whalen	941	Frank Dennie	840	Bruce Kerr	1103	Margaret Summers	1427
Nick Upchan	419	Kenneth Hoop	1327	Robert Chartrand	698	Frank Dennie	840	Bruce Kerr	1103	Margaret Summers	1427
