= 2023–25 Canada–India diplomatic row =

Period of diplomatic crisis between Canada and India

The Canada–India diplomatic row was a diplomatic dispute between Canada and India that started in September 2023, with periodic escalation throughout the following year. While the diplomatic row was initially triggered due to Canadian Prime Minister Justin Trudeau's allegations that the Indian government was involved in the assassination of the militant Hardeep Singh Nijjar, the ongoing tensions between India and Canada have been largely fuelled by disagreements over the Sikh separatist and militant Khalistan movement and its active supporters.

This led to a prolonged diplomatic stand-off between the countries. Both the countries expelled diplomatic staff, claiming interference in the other's internal affairs.

In 2023, both countries expelled members of each other's diplomatic staff and advised their citizens against traveling to the other; Canada closed three consulates in India. In October 2024, Canada expelled Sanjay Kumar Verma, the Indian High Commissioner to Canada, along with five other diplomats. India retaliated with six expulsions of its own.

Leaders of various nations released statements expressing concern on the stand-off. However, under Prime Minister Mark Carney, relations have improved and the two countries have restored diplomatic relations since 2025.

== Background ==
Canada has the largest Sikh population outside India. Sikhs who number 770,000, account for nearly 2 percent of Canada's population. Some Sikhs living in Canada are prominent members of the Khalistan movement, which advocates for a separation from India to create an independent Sikh homeland.

India has since increasingly accused Canada of giving free rein to Khalistani activists in Canada.

In March 2023, Canada's High Commissioner was summoned by India to convey strong concern over Sikh protesters in Canada and the security breach of India's diplomatic mission and consulates.

In June 2023, Hardeep Singh Nijjar was assassinated in Canada.

In September 2023, on the sidelines of the G20 summit in New Delhi, the Indian Prime Minister Narendra Modi conveyed concerns about the protests in Canada to Canadian Prime Minister Justin Trudeau.

In 2023, Canada paused talks on a proposed trade treaty with India. In September 2023, Canada announced it had postponed an October trade mission to India.

On 18 September 2023, Prime Minister Trudeau addressing the House of Commons said that "Over the past number of weeks, Canadian security agencies have been actively pursuing credible allegations of a potential link between agents of the government of India and the killing of a Canadian citizen, Hardeep Singh Nijjar". Trudeau stated that he had presented the accusations directly to Prime Minister Modi "in no uncertain terms" during the G20 summit in New Delhi. Trudeau further added that "any involvement of a foreign government in the killing of a Canadian citizen on Canadian soil is an unacceptable violation of our sovereignty" while urging the Indian government to cooperate in the ongoing investigation.

Indian Ministry of External Affairs rejected Trudeau's allegations in a statement saying that claims of India's "involvement in any act of violence in Canada are absurd and motivated". It added that similar accusations made earlier by Trudeau to Prime Minister Modi had been "completely rejected". The statement further said that "Such unsubstantiated allegations seek to shift the focus from Khalistani terrorists and extremists, who have been provided shelter in Canada and continue to threaten India's sovereignty and territorial integrity". India urged Canada "to take prompt and effective legal action against all anti-India elements operating from their soil". It said that Canada's inaction has been "a long-standing and continuing concern".

The tensions between the countries were fueled by disagreements over the separatist Khalistan movement and its active supporters.

The Indian government claimed that Canada has not provided any evidence linking the Indian government to Nijjar's death. Canada contended that it was provided intelligence on the same by US intelligence agencies.

== Diplomatic row ==
On 18 September 2023, Canadian Minister of Foreign Affairs Melanie Joly announced that Canada had expelled Pavan Kumar Rai — a "senior Indian diplomat". According to Joly, Rai was the Station chief of the Canada station of India's foreign intelligence agency — Research and Analysis Wing. The High Commission of India in Ottawa lists Rai as the minister responsible for "eco, coordination, community affairs".

In her statement, Joly said that Canada "will not tolerate any form of foreign interference". She added that such action "is not only troubling but it is completely unacceptable". She further said that India's involvement if proven true would be "a great violation of our sovereignty and of the most basic rule of how countries deal with each other".

On 19 September 2023, India expelled a top diplomat of Canada with five days' notice to leave the country amid "growing concern at the interference of Canadian diplomats" in India's "internal matters and their involvement in anti-India activities", according to a statement from Indian Ministry of External Affairs. The expelled diplomat was later identified as the CSIS's Station chief in India - Olivier Sylvestere.

On 20 September 2023, India warned its citizens due to "growing anti-India activities and politically condoned hate crimes and criminal violence" to "exercise utmost caution" in Canada. Dominic LeBlanc, Canadian public safety minister, responded to the travel alert saying "Canada is a safe country".

On 21 September 2023, Indian external affairs ministry spokesperson Arindam Bagchi announced that India has suspended "temporarily the issuance of visas or providing visa services" for all Canadian nationals in all categories, including e-visas and for Canadian citizens applying from third countries, due to "security threats" against its diplomats.

On 24 September 2023, Canada updated its travel advisory for India, advising its citizens there to "remain vigilant and exercise caution" due to "calls for protests and some negative sentiment towards Canada on social media". It urges travellers to "exercise a high degree of caution in India due to the threat of terrorist attacks throughout the country".

In early October, India asked Canada to withdraw 41 of its 62 diplomats from the country and threatened to revoke the diplomatic immunity of diplomats who would remain after a certain date. On 18 October 2023, 41 Canadian diplomats along with 42 of their family members left India. Mélanie Joly, the Canadian foreign minister, said that Canada will temporarily close three consulates in India and concentrate services at its high commission in Delhi, with 21 diplomats remaining in India. Canada's immigration minister, Marc Miller said that the situation would cause delays in the immigration applications and processing of visas for people in India.

On 20 October 2023, India's Ministry of External Affairs issued a statement stating that "Their continued interference in our internal affairs warrant a parity in mutual diplomatic presence in New Delhi and Ottawa".

In November 2023, at the United Nations Human Rights Council in Geneva, India availed the Universal Periodic Review of the human rights records of Canada to request Canada to “prevent misuse of freedom of expression for inciting violence and disallow activities of groups which are promoting extremism”.

In April 2024, the Canadian deputy high commissioner was summoned by India after separatist slogans supporting a Sikh homeland were allegedly raised at a Vaisakhi event addressed by Prime Minister Trudeau.

Concerns were voiced within Canada with members such as the Premier of British Columbia David Eby voicing out suspicion that the federal government is holding back information. Balraj Singh, son of Hardeep Nijjar, said his father had been meeting with Canadian Security Intelligence Service officers before the murder and according to a report by The Economic Times, Nijjar was suspected to be an asset for Canadian security services.

In September 2024, RRM Canada examined a number of Indian media outlets and named organisations such as Asian News International (ANI), WION, Aaj Tak, and journalists like Smita Prakash, Palki Sharma, and Anand Ranganathan and noted their potential influence on Canadian public opinion in order to promote narratives related to Justin Trudeau, Hardeep Singh Nijjar, and Canada–India relations. The report added the emergence of these activities since the Canadian government has accused Indian involvement in the murder of Nijjar.

Speaking at the Council on Foreign Relations, India's Minister of External Affairs S. Jaishankar raised concern over the incidents of threats to Indian diplomats and attacks on Indian consulates, stating that these are very permissive because of political reasons. He assured that the Indian side will take action if the Canadian side provides specific information in connection with Nijjar's killing. There were further statements by leaders of the Khalistan movement threatening Indo-Canadian Hindus to leave Canada. The Indian government also instructed its investigative agencies to identify all Khalistan supporters in Canada, and canceled their Overseas Citizenship of India card to prevent them from entering India, in addition to confiscating their assets in India.

On October 29 2024 David Morrison, Canada's Minister of Deputy Foreign Affairs, shared with Parliament members that he had provided Indian home minister Amit Shah's name to the Washington Post, which first reported the allegations of the Indian government's involvement in 2023. Morrison did not explain how Canada knew about Shah's alleged involvement. In response, India issued a formal protest calling the claims of Shah's involvement 'absurd and baseless', with a spokesperson from the Indian Foreign Ministry further stating "such irresponsible actions will have serious consequences for bilateral ties”.

On November 22, 2024, Nathalie G. Drouin from the Privy Council Office stated that the Canadian Government is “not aware of evidence, linking Prime Minister Modi, Minister Jaishankar, or NSA Doval to the serious criminal activity within Canada"

=== 2024 ===
In June 2024, Modi and Trudeau met briefly at the 50th G7 summit in Italy, signaling a resumption of dialogue and a reduction in diplomatic tensions. International relations experts have called for Canada and India to find a way forward in their relations due to their engagement in a broad range of geopolitical issues and India's importance for the United States and Canada in their Indo-Pacific strategy.

On 12 October 2024, Canadian officials informed Ajit Doval, India's National Security Advisor, that the Indian High Commissioner Sanjay Kumar Verma, and five other diplomats were persons of interest in the Nijjar murder and asked for their diplomatic and consular immunity to be removed so as to cooperate in the investigation. Canadian minister of Foreign Affairs Mélanie Joly said that India did not agree to this, and the diplomats were served with notices of expulsion. India released a conflicting statement saying that it had instead already withdrawn the diplomats out of safety concerns, but later announced a tit-for-tat expulsion of six Canadian diplomats.

Canadian officials said they had evidence of the involvement of the Indian government in various home invasions, drive-by shootings, arson and two homicides, those of Nijjar and of Sukhdool Singh, shot in Winnipeg on 20 September 2023. They said that Indian diplomats intimidated and coerced Canadians, who were seeking immigration documents and/or had family ties in India, to gather intelligence for the Indian Intelligence agency RAW and to surveil targets, who were then attacked by a gang led by Lawrence Bishnoi.

The Royal Canadian Mounted Police said they had arrested several people in connection with the case, some of whom they alleged to have had links to the Government of India. They also said to have alerted twelve Canadian residents of Indian descent based on credible evidence that they could be targeted by Indian agents and encouraged people with information to come forward to help with the investigation.

After Verma's expulsion, he alleged there being a significant presence and infiltration of pro-Khalistan elements in Canada's law and order institutions, defense forces, and the Canadian Parliament.

=== 2025 ===
In June 2025, David Eby, the Premier of British Columbia, asked Prime Minister Mark Carney to list the Lawrence Bishnoi gang as a designated terrorist group. Later that year, an RCMP report on the Lawrence Bishnoi gang assessed that it had been "acting on behalf of the Indian government" and that its criminal enterprise in Canada was growing. In September 2025, the government listed the gang as a terrorist entity.

=== 2026 ===
While on a trade mission to India in January 2026, Eby stated the report was not an intelligence report but a "summary of publicly available reports from more than a year ago." Eby also underscored that while the investigation is ongoing, closer ties with India regarding trade and resources are also critical in response to the tariffs imposed by President Donald Trump. His response drew strong reactions from the Sikh community in Canada who said they were "misleading and dangerous"

Canadian Prime Minister Mark Carney made a state visit to India in early 2026, where he met with Indian officials, including Prime Minister Modi; the two nations signed multiple MOUs worth billions of dollars, relating to energy, minerals, pharmaceuticals, academics, and more. Carney's openness towards restoring ties with India has received criticism from some Sikh rights organizations within Canada, in the wake of allegations of foreign interference. In addition, in February 2026, a senior Canadian official told the Toronto Star that India was no longer linked to violent crime in Canada, a claim disputed by others. This claim was later affirmed by RCMP commissioner Michael Duheme in March.

== Reactions ==
A spokesperson for Australia's Foreign Minister, Penny Wong, stated that “Australia is deeply concerned by these allegations and notes ongoing investigations into this matter. Australia believes all countries should respect sovereignty and the rule of law”. In 2024, the Australian Foreign Minister stated she raised allegations with her Indian counterpart, S. Jaishankar during his visit to Australia in November.

A spokesperson for the United Kingdom's Foreign, Commonwealth and Development Office said that they "do not agree with the decisions taken by the Indian government that have resulted in a number of Canadian diplomats departing India". The statement added that they "continue to encourage India to engage with Canada on its independent investigation into the death of Hardeep Singh Nijjar".

The United States Department of State spokesperson Matthew Miller said that they "urged the Indian government not to insist upon a reduction in Canada's diplomatic presence and to cooperate in the ongoing Canadian investigation".

The New Zealand's Ministry of Foreign Affairs expressed concern in a statement saying “Now seems the time for more diplomacy, not less,” adding that it expects "all states to uphold their obligations under the 1961 Vienna Convention on Diplomatic Relations, including in relation to the privileges and immunities of accredited staff”.

According to Michael Kugelman, director of the South Asia Institute at the Wilson Center think-tank, "this may be the lowest level to which this relationship has sunk. It won't be easy to return to the old normal anytime soon".

== See also ==
- 2024 India–Maldives diplomatic row
- Assassination of Kim Jong-nam
- Assassination of Jamal Khashoggi
