= William S. Beaton =

Canadian politician (1896–1956)

Mayor of Sudbury, Ontario
- In office 1941–1951
- Preceded by: W. J. Forest
- Succeeded by: Dan Jessup

Personal details
- Born: August 19, 1896 East Gwillimbury, Ontario
- Died: April 1, 1956 (aged 59) Sudbury, Ontario

William S. (Bill) Beaton (August 19, 1896 – April 1, 1956) was a Canadian politician, who was the 22nd mayor of the City of Sudbury, Ontario. He was elected to office in 1941 and was elected to office a record 11 times. An avid amateur athlete, Beaton was heavily involved in the city's amateur sporting events and as such the annual Beaton Classic was named in his honor.

Beaton is credited the elimination of the city's streetcar system, and the construction of the Sudbury Arena.

Beaton also ran as an Ontario Liberal Party candidate in Sudbury in the 1948 provincial election, but lost that election to Welland Gemmell.

After a decade as mayor, Beaton was defeated in 1952 by Dan Jessup, a local businessmen.

== The 1950 Municipal Election ==
The municipal election of 1950 represented the start of a key shift in the demographic of city council. It was in this election that citizens of Sudbury elected two women to serve as alderman for the first time in the city's history. They were Grace Hartman and Dr. Faustina Kelly Cook. Although Beaton was successful in this his eleventh election, this would mark the start of a turn of events that would lead to the end of the Beaton dynasty.

On an interesting side note, Beaton also ran against Peter Fenton, the Mayor of the City of Sudbury from 1930 to 1932.

City of Sudbury Election Results, 1950
Mayoral Contest
Candidate	Votes				
Candidate	Adv. Polls	Fournier Ward	McCormick Ward	Ryan Ward	Total
BEATON (elected)	15	718	1579	2009	4321
Whissell	11	1705	748	1176	3640
Fenton	14	269	719	869	1871
Aldermanic Contest
Fournier Ward		McCormick Ward		Ryan Ward	
Candidate	Votes	Candidate	Votes	Candidate	Votes
LAMOUREUX (elected)	1944	HARTMAN (elected)	2238	THOMPSON (elected)	2568
COOK (elected)	1434	BARLOW (elected)	1867	COE (elected)	1916
GODIN (elected)	1010	MONAGHAN (elected)	1219	ANDERSON (elected)	1553
Campeau	843	Furchner	1148	McNeill	1442
Theriault	748	O'Neil	529	Germa	1264
Theriault	748	Cler	308	Nesbit	673

The view the full results see: Sudbury municipal election, 1950.

== Books ==
- Dorian, Charles (1961). The First 75 Years, A Headline History of Sudbury, Canada. Arthur H. Stockwell Limited, Ilfracombe, Devon.
- Wallace, C. M.; & Thomson, Ashley (Eds.) (1993). Sudbury: Rail Town to Regional Capital (3rd ed.). Dundram Press Limited. ISBN 978-1-55002-170-7.
