= Max Silverman =

Canadian politician (1900–1966)

Mayor of Sudbury, Ontario
- In office January – October 5, 1966
- Preceded by: Joe Fabbro
- Succeeded by: Grace Hartman

Personal details
- Born: August 25, 1900 New York City, New York, United States
- Died: October 5, 1966 (aged 66) Toronto, Ontario, Canada
- Occupation: Hockey manager

Max Silverman (August 25, 1900 – October 5, 1966) was a Canadian ice hockey manager and politician, who was the mayor of Sudbury, Ontario in 1966.

== Background ==
He was the son of Myer Silverman and Sara Riva Benjamin, Russian Jewish immigrants who had briefly lived in New York City, where Max Silverman was born, before moving to Sudbury around the turn of the century. Myer and his brothers Aaron and Hiram opened Silverman's, the city's first department store, although their partnership soon dissolved due to business disagreements, and the store continued under Aaron's sole ownership while Myer opened his own competing discount store across the street.

Saul Silverman, Aaron's son and Max's cousin, would also become an important figure in the city, serving on the boards of both Sudbury General Hospital and Laurentian University.

== Career ==
=== Sports ===
He began his longtime association with the Sudbury Wolves in his youth, working various entry-level positions for the team until becoming the goal umpire at age 16. By the early 1930s, he was the team's president and general manager.

Silverman and coach Samuel Rothschild led the team to victory in the 1932 Memorial Cup, the 1935 Richardson Cup and the 1938 World Ice Hockey Championships. The team also competed in the 1949 World Ice Hockey Championships, but lost to the Czechoslovak team.

Silverman later took over the coaching role himself until retiring from that position in 1955, although he retained the title of honorary president. He sold the team to a local business consortium for $17,500 in 1956, and subsequently served a short stint as coach of the Indianapolis Chiefs in the International Hockey League, before returning to Sudbury to launch a new team, the Sudbury Combines, in the Northern Ontario Hockey Association's senior division.

The Combines played an exhibition game against the Czechoslovak national team in 1960, in what was widely billed as a "rematch" of the 1949 Wolves vs. Czechoslovakia series, but lost 9-4. Despite not yet being formally admitted to the NOHA, they were permitted to enter that year's NOHA playoffs, but were defeated in the regional semi-finals by the Rouyn-Noranda Alouettes and did not advance in the series. The fledgling team effectively collapsed by the fall, however, and never played again after 1960.

=== Politics ===
Silverman unsuccessfully ran for the city's Board of Control in 1960, but was successful in 1962. He served as the city's deputy mayor from 1962 to 1964, and defeated Joe Fabbro for the mayoralty in the 1965 Sudbury municipal election. He was the city's first Jewish mayor.

While serving as mayor, he sat on a committee of mayors appointed to study the feasibility of Northern Ontario separating from Ontario to form a new province, alongside G. W. Maybury of Kapuskasing, Ernest Reid of Fort William, Leo Del Villano of Timmins, Merle Dickerson of North Bay and Leo Foucault of Espanola.

He died on October 5, 1966, after less than a year in office. His death resulted in the elevation of deputy mayor Grace Hartman to the mayoralty, making her the city's first female mayor.
