= 1929 Sudbury municipal election =

Canadian municipal election

The Sudbury Municipal election in 1929 was scheduled for December 1, 1929. On November 23, 1929 the City of Sudbury, Ontario declared Peter Fenton mayor. In addition to the Mayor's post, City Council was also acclaimed.

== 1929 Election results ==
The results of the Mayoral and Aldermanic contests as reported by the Sudbury Star on November 23, 1929 are as follows:

Mayor of the City of Sudbury 1930
Peter Fenton
Sudbury City Council 1930
J. B. Ducharme	J. W. Brownlee	Fred Davison
Leo J. Robert	James Newburn	F. C. Muirhead
