= 1928 Sudbury municipal election =

The 1928 municipal election was held on December 3, 1928. Charles Bibby was acclaimed the Mayor of the City of Sudbury.

The candidates elected to Sudbury City Council were:

- Peter Fenton
- Leo J. Robert
- Philippe Lanthier
- J. Newburn
- Dan Jessup
- F. C. Muirhead

At the time of this election, the candidates were elected to serve the City of Sudbury and were not elected to represent each of the wards individually.

== Election moments ==
The election results were not fully tabulated until 12 o'clock the day after the election. During the election, there was a minor mix-up in the returns. Councillor Drybrough's total was given at 751 when in reality it was 731. The town clerk, W. J. Ross, who was responsible of for returns, was questioned by the Sudbury Star regarding this discrepancy.

The reporter requested that Mr. Ross to look at his list. Mr. Ross tersely said that he wouldn't.

"But how do you account for the difference of twenty?" enquired the reporter.

"Seven men checked those figures" replied the town clerk with all the dignity of his command. "and they're official. I won't change them."

Initially Ross would not change the figures; however, after the reporter removed the results card from the wall, he continued to press Ross for answer. Ross then quickly reviewed the figures and subsequently Frank C. Muirhead was elected to council, defeating the incumbent Drybourogh by 20 votes.

The reporter continued to investigate the election results, and also discovered that Council;or Newburn also had 20 votes misallocated. Newburn's tally in the "L – Z" poll was 139 when it should have read 159. Concerned that Newburn would not have the necessary clout in the Fournier ward after the election, the reporter brought this to the attention of the officials. The reporter subsequently stopped investigating, after an unnamed candidate elect cautioned him against further investigation. He was quoted as saying "First thing you know, if you keep checking these figures I'll find out I haven't been elected at all."

== Results ==
The results of the mayoral and Aldermanic contests as reported by the Sudbury Star on December 5, 1928 are as follows:

City of Sudbury Election Results, 1928
Mayoral contest
Candidate	Votes					
Candidate	Adv. Polls	Fournier Ward Town Hall	Fournier Ward Notre Dame St	McCormick Ward	Ryan Ward	Total
BIBBY (acclaimed)	---	---	---	---	---	---
Aldermanic Contest
Candidate	Votes					
Candidate	Adv. Polls	Fournier Ward Town Hall	Fournier Ward Notre Dame St	McCormick Ward	Ryan Ward	Total
FENTON (elected)	15	328	130	305	465	1243
ROBERT (elected)	14	442	228	218	335	1237
LANTHIER (elected)	7	426	207	179	240	1059
NEWBURN (elected)	12	304	141	242	331	1030
JESSUP (elected)	6	83	14	412	420	935
MUIRHEAD (elected)	3	61	10	360	303	737
Drybrough	6	43	12	345	325	731
Miller	3	68	12	354	275	712
Keegan	11	155	33	173	225	597
Brownlee	8	75	18	274	197	572
Cowcill	4	39	7	187	128	365
