= 1930 Sudbury municipal election =

The 1930 Municipal election was held on December 1, 1930. Peter Fenton was elected Mayor of the City of Sudbury.

The candidates elected to Sudbury City Council were:

Sudbury City Council 1931
Fournier Ward	McCormick Ward	Ryan Ward
J. B. Ducharme	Earl A. Martin	Dan Jessup
W. L. Laforest	J. Fred Woods	William J. Cullen
Paul Savard	J. Newburn	A. Gustiana

== 1930 Election results ==
The results of the Mayoral and Aldermanic contests as reported by the Sudbury Star on December 3, 1930, are as follows:

City of Sudbury Election Results, 1930
Mayoral Contest
Candidate	Votes											
Candidate	McCormick Ward			Ryan Ward				Fournier Ward			Adv. Polls	Total
Candidate	Poll No.			Poll No.				Poll No.			Adv. Polls	Total
Candidate	1	2	3	4	5	6	7	8	9	10	Adv. Polls	Total
FENTON (elected)	169	117	103	240	95	108	91	229	43	174	9	1378
Korpinen	1	7	3	19	5	5	18	3	2	6	0	69
Travers	187	83	125	178	53	101	110	226	66	136	13	1278

Aldermanic Contest
McCormick Ward						Ryan Ward							Fournier Ward					
Candidate	Poll No.			Adv. Polls	Total	Candidate	Poll No.				Adv. Polls	Total	Candidate	Poll No.			Adv. Polls	Total
Candidate	1	2	3	Adv. Polls	Total	Candidate	4	5	6	7	Adv. Polls	Total	Candidate	8	9	10	Adv. Polls	Total
MARTIN (elected)	204	118	126	2	450	JESSUP (elected)	268	75	121	68	6	538	DUCHARME (elected)	297	77	203	2	579
WOODS (elected)	201	75	116	3	395	CULLEN (elected)	140	60	86	91	9	386	LAFOREST (elected)	269	54	172	2	497
NEWBURN (elected)	149	77	80	1	307	GUSTIANA (elected)	143	46	62	113	6	370	SAVARD (elected)	207	60	224	1	492
Brownlee	96	77	101	4	278	Davison	116	47	45	39	2	249	Joly	157	45	91	0	293
Ferry	127	71	64	1	263	Buder	99	39	27	18	4	197	Boivin	129	31	67	1	228
Hall	107	67	79	3	256	Newman	90	21	50	29	4	194	Clement	139	27	41	0	207
Linklater	57	34	34	0	125	McGinn	109	32	15	18	2	176	Clement	139	27	41	0	207
Linklater	57	34	34	0	125	Tanner	36	13	40	18	0	107	Clement	139	27	41	0	207
Linklater	57	34	34	0	125	Senior	29	13	24	39	0	105	Clement	139	27	41	0	207
Linklater	57	34	34	0	125	Savage	42	10	10	22	0	84	Clement	139	27	41	0	207
Linklater	57	34	34	0	125	Ellman	22	8	4	19	0	83	Clement	139	27	41	0	207
