= List of United States presidential visits to Canada =

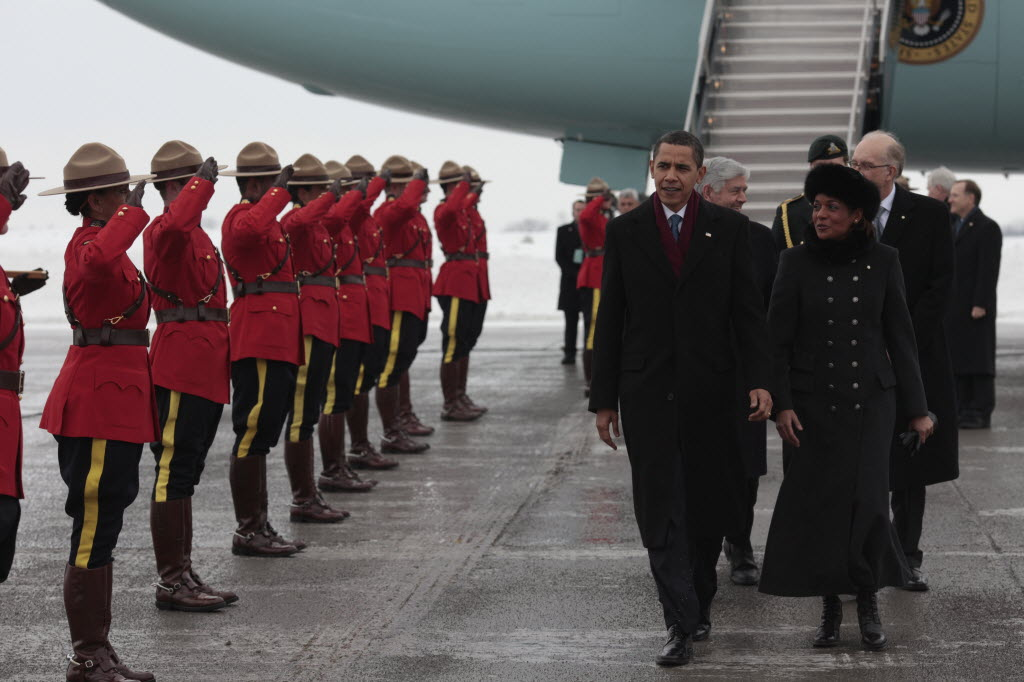
Governor General Michaëlle Jean escorts President Barack Obama from Air Force One, in Ottawa, Ontario, during his February 2009 presidential visit to Canada

There have been 42 United States presidential visits to Canada by 14 presidents over the past century. As the U.S. president is both head of state and head of government, these visits have taken many forms, ranging from formal state visits to official visits, working visits, or private visits (or, as in the case of Franklin D. Roosevelt, personal vacations).

Since the first presidential visit, made by Warren G. Harding in 1923 (one week before his death), Canada has become one of the most common presidential international travel destinations. Since the Franklin Roosevelt administration, only Gerald Ford and Jimmy Carter never visited Canada while in office. Eight presidents have addressed a joint session of the Parliament of Canada, with Dwight D. Eisenhower and Ronald Reagan both speaking twice.

== Table of visits ==
President	Date(s)	Location(s)	Key details
Warren G. Harding	July 26, 1923	Vancouver	Official reception during return from Alaska, hosted by British Columbia Premier John Oliver and Vancouver mayor Charles Tisdall.
Franklin D. Roosevelt	June 29–July 1, 1933	Campobello Island	Vacation.
Franklin D. Roosevelt	July 28–30, 1936	Campobello Island	Vacation.
Franklin D. Roosevelt	July 31, 1936	Quebec City	Official visit; met with Governor General John Buchan.
Franklin D. Roosevelt	August 18, 1938	Kingston	Received honorary degree from Queen's University and together with Prime Minister William Lyon Mackenzie King and the Lieutenant Governor of Ontario, Albert Edward Matthews, dedicated the Thousand Islands Bridge.
Franklin D. Roosevelt	August 14–16, 1939	Campobello Island, Sydney	Vacation.
Franklin D. Roosevelt	August 21–23, 1939	Halifax	Stopped while returning to the United States.
Franklin D. Roosevelt	August 17–25, 1943	Quebec City; Ottawa	Attended First Quebec Conference with British prime minister Winston Churchill and Prime Minister William Lyon Mackenzie King to discuss policy during World War II. Addressed senators, Members of Parliament, and the general public outside the houses of parliament.
Franklin D. Roosevelt	September 11–16, 1944	Quebec City	Attended Second Quebec Conference with British prime minister Winston Churchill and the Allied Combined Chiefs of Staff.
Harry S. Truman	June 10–12, 1947	Ottawa	Official visit; met with the governor general, the Earl of Athlone and Prime Minister William Lyon Mackenzie King and addressed Parliament.
Dwight D. Eisenhower	November 13–15, 1953	Ottawa	State visit; Met with Governor General Vincent Massey and Prime Minister Louis St. Laurent and addressed Parliament.
Dwight D. Eisenhower	July 8–11, 1958	Ottawa	Informal visit; met with Governor General Vincent Massey and Prime Minister John Diefenbaker and addressed Parliament.
Dwight D. Eisenhower	June 26, 1959	Montreal	Joined Queen Elizabeth II in ceremony opening the St. Lawrence Seaway.
John F. Kennedy	May 16–18, 1961	Ottawa	State visit; Met with Governor General Georges Vanier and Prime Minister John Diefenbaker and addressed Parliament.
Lyndon B. Johnson	September 16, 1964	Vancouver	Informal visit; met with Prime Minister Lester B. Pearson in ceremonies related to the Columbia River Treaty.
Lyndon B. Johnson	August 21–22, 1966	Campobello Island, Chamcook	Laid cornerstone at Roosevelt Campobello International Park and conferred informally with Prime Minister Lester B. Pearson.
Lyndon B. Johnson	May 25, 1967	Montreal, Ottawa	Attended Expo 67, and met privately with the governor general Roland Michener and Prime Minister Lester B. Pearson.
Richard M. Nixon	April 13–15, 1972	Ottawa	State visit; Met with Governor General Michener and Prime Minister Pierre Trudeau, addressed parliament, and signed the Great Lakes Water Quality Agreement.
Ronald Reagan	March 10–11, 1981	Ottawa	State visit; Met with Governor General Edward Schreyer and Prime Minister Pierre Trudeau and addressed Parliament.
Ronald Reagan	July 19–21, 1981	Ottawa, Montebello	Attended 7th G7 summit with heads of state and government from Canada, France, the Federal Republic of Germany, Italy, Japan, and the United Kingdom.
Ronald Reagan	March 17–18, 1985	Quebec City	Met with Prime Minister Brian Mulroney. The meeting was commonly known as the Shamrock Summit.
Ronald Reagan	April 4–6, 1987	Ottawa	Official visit; met with Prime Minister Brian Mulroney and addressed Parliament.
Ronald Reagan	June 19–21, 1988	Toronto	Attended 14th G7 summit with heads of state and government from Canada, France, West Germany, Italy, Japan, and the United Kingdom.
George H. W. Bush	February 10, 1989	Ottawa	Working visit; met with Prime Minister Brian Mulroney.
George H. W. Bush	April 10, 1990	Toronto	Informal meeting with Prime Minister Brian Mulroney.
George H. W. Bush	March 13–14, 1991	Ottawa	Met with Prime Minister Brian Mulroney and signed an Air Quality Agreement.
George H. W. Bush	July 9, 1991	Toronto	Informal meeting with Prime Minister Brian Mulroney.
Bill Clinton	April 3–4, 1993	Vancouver	Summit meeting with Russian President Boris Yeltsin; also met with Prime Minister Brian Mulroney.
Bill Clinton	February 23–24, 1995	Ottawa	State visit; met with Governor General Roméo LeBlanc and Prime Minister Jean Chrétien and addressed Parliament.
Bill Clinton	June 15–17, 1995	Halifax	Attended 21st G7 summit with heads of state and government from Canada, France, Germany, Italy, Japan, and the United Kingdom. Also met with Russian president Boris Yeltsin.
Bill Clinton	November 23–25, 1997	Vancouver	Attended APEC Summit meeting.
Bill Clinton	October 7–8, 1999	Ottawa, Mont-Tremblant	Working visit. Met with Prime Minister Jean Chrétien and Quebec Premier Lucien Bouchard, attended Federalism Conference, and dedicated new American Embassy building.
George W. Bush	April 20–22, 2001	Quebec City	Attended the 3rd Summit of the Americas.
George W. Bush	June 25–27, 2002	Kananaskis	Attended the 28th G8 summit.
George W. Bush	November 30 – December 1, 2004	Ottawa, Gatineau, Halifax	Delivered a speech at Pier 21 in Halifax, met with Prime Minister Paul Martin and conducted a series of other events.
George W. Bush	August 20–21, 2007	Montebello	Attended the North American Leaders' Summit, with Prime Minister Stephen Harper and Mexican president Felipe Calderón.
Barack Obama	February 19, 2009	Ottawa	Working visit. Met with Governor General Michaëlle Jean and Prime Minister Stephen Harper.
Barack Obama	June 25–27, 2010	Huntsville, Toronto	Attended the 36th G8 summit and G-20 Summit Meeting.
Barack Obama	June 29, 2016	Ottawa	State visit. Met with Governor General David Johnston and Prime Minister Justin Trudeau and addressed Parliament. Attended the North American Leaders' Summit with Prime Minister Justin Trudeau and Mexican president Enrique Peña Nieto.
Donald Trump	June 8–9, 2018	La Malbaie	Attended the 44th G7 summit.
Joe Biden	March 23–24, 2023	Ottawa	State visit. Met with Governor General Mary Simon and Prime Minister Justin Trudeau and addressed Parliament.
Donald Trump	June 15–17, 2025	Kananaskis	Attended the 51st G7 summit.

== Dominion of Newfoundland ==
Prior to becoming a Canadian province in 1949, Newfoundland was a separate Dominion. President Franklin Roosevelt visited there twice: He vacationed at Bay of Islands and Bonne Bay on August 17 to 20, 1939. Two years later, between August 9 and 12, he returned to Newfoundland, ostensibly for another vacation. In actuality, he conferred with British prime minister Winston Churchill aboard HMS Prince of Wales and USS Augusta in Placentia Bay. At the conclusion of the conference, they issued the Atlantic Charter.

== See also ==
- Canada–United States relations
- Foreign policy of the United States
- Foreign relations of the United States
