= Leo Landreville =

Canadian politician and judge (1910–1996)

Mayor of Sudbury, Ontario
- In office 1955–1956
- Preceded by: Dan Jessup
- Succeeded by: Joe Fabbro

Personal details
- Born: Léo Albert Landreville; February 23, 1910 Ottawa, Ontario
- Died: 1996 (aged 85–86)

Léo Landreville (February 23, 1910 – 1996) was a Canadian politician and lawyer, who served as mayor of Sudbury, Ontario in 1955 and 1956 before being appointed to the Supreme Court of Ontario as a judge. He later became the first Ontario Supreme Court justice ever to be removed from the bench, after being implicated in the Northern Ontario Natural Gas scandal.

Landreville, a native of Ottawa, practised law in Sudbury in the 1940s and 1950s before becoming the city's mayor. During his mayoral term, he was offered an option on 10,000 shares of stock in Northern Ontario Natural Gas, a company run by Ralph K. Farris that was seeking a municipal agreement on the construction of a natural gas pipeline through Northern Ontario. When the NONG contract was approved by city council, Farris purchased the shares at the original price offered to Landreville, sold 2,500 shares to reimburse the company, and delivered the 7,500 remaining shares to Landreville at no cost.

Following his appointment to the Supreme Court, Landreville sold the shares for a profit of $117,000.

After an Ontario Securities Commission investigation into NONG's stock distributions, it was ultimately revealed that many of Northern Ontario's mayors, as well as some members of Premier Leslie Frost's cabinet, had received low-cost shares.

After a second investigation, Landreville was charged with municipal corruption and conspiracy, and was acquitted as there was no evidence that he had exerted any influence on Sudbury's city council to approve the NONG contract. In response, however, the Law Society of Upper Canada held a secret hearing in which it determined that despite the acquittal, Landreville's conduct had fallen below the "standards of probity" demanded of a judge, and called for his resignation.

In 1966, Prime Minister Lester Pearson appointed a Royal Commission, chaired by Ivan Rand, to investigate the case. Controversially, the Law Society report was admitted into the proceedings, but the original judgement acquitting Landreville of misconduct was not. Landreville was also never given an opportunity, as required under law, to respond to the royal commission's report.

Landreville initially refused to resign from the bench, leading Pearson's government to announce, on June 6, 1967, an unusual joint address of the House of Commons and the Senate to have him removed from the bench. He was then convinced to resign voluntarily with the promise of a partial pension.

Pierre Trudeau, then Justice Minister, later wrote to advise Landreville that the federal cabinet had decided not to offer Landreville the pension, although subsequent Access to Information requests revealed that the cabinet had made no such decision. Landreville waged a ten-year legal battle to have the pension offer honoured, and was finally offered $250,000.

Landreville subsequently returned to practising law.
