= Joint address (Canada) =

Special procedure of Canadian Parliament

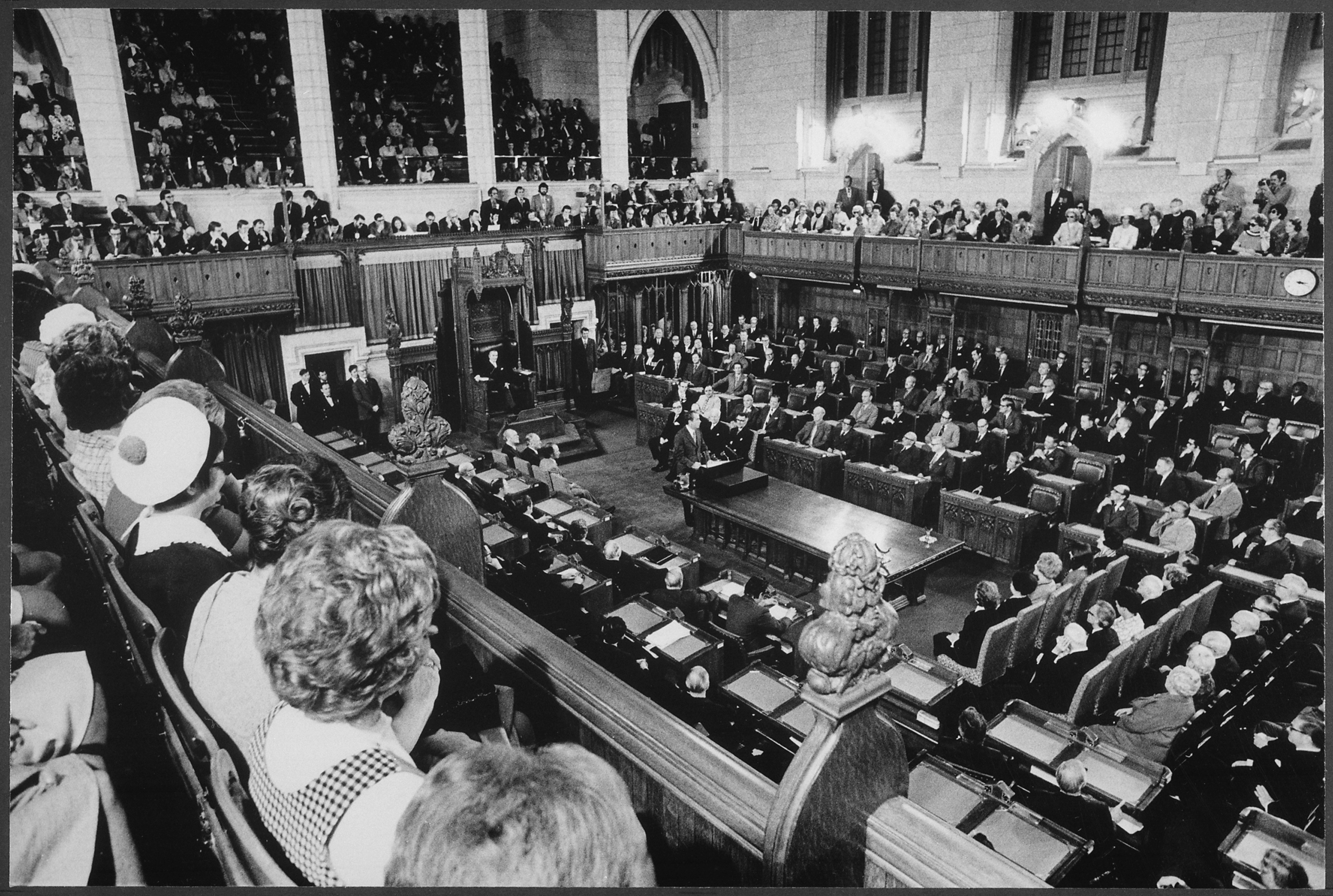
Richard Nixon addresses a joint session of the Parliament of Canada, 1972

A joint address to Parliament is a speech made by a distinguished visitor, usually a foreign head of state or head of government, to Members of the Senate and the House of Commons under a special procedure of the Canadian Parliament, in which members of the House of Commons and Senate sit jointly in the chamber of the House of Commons, that chamber acting, for the occasion, as an auditorium. The speaker of the House of Commons takes his chair, as normal, with the speaker of the Senate seated to their right. Members of Parliament also take their usual seats, with senators and justices of the Supreme Court positioned on the floor of the House, in front of the clerk's table. Gallery privileges are suspended during a joint address and access to those areas is strictly limited to invited guests. Fifty-two heads of state and five non-heads of state have addressed the Joint Sessions of the Senate and House of Commons of Canada since 1939.

== Circumstances ==
Such an event is used most commonly when a visiting dignitary—such as a foreign head of state or head of government—is asked to address Parliament. However, on more rare occasions, the process may also be used to make a formal, binding request of the Canadian monarch; for example, this was part of the process used to amend the constitution of Canada prior to patriation in 1982. In extreme circumstances, a joint address may also be used to remove a person previously appointed by the King-in-Council—such as a judge or ambassador—if other avenues of doing so have failed. For example, Prime Minister Lester B. Pearson announced a joint address in 1967 to have Leo Landreville removed from the bench of the Supreme Court of Ontario, due to allegations of improper stock trading. Landreville had previously refused to resign, as he had not actually been convicted of a crime, but, resigned voluntarily after the government declared its intention to forcibly remove him from office.

Although most addresses are made to joint sessions of Parliament, on 7 May 1941, Robert G. Menzies, Prime Minister of Australia, spoke only to the House of Commons. On 25 August 1943, Franklin D. Roosevelt, President of the United States, addressed senators, members of Parliament, and the general public outside the houses of Parliament.

== Dignitaries ==
The following persons have addressed a joint session of Parliament:

Date	Dignitary	Office	Image
30 December 1941	Winston Churchill	Prime Minister of the United Kingdom	
3 June 1943	Edvard Beneš	President of Czechoslovakia	
16 June 1943	Soong Mei-ling	First Lady of the Republic of China	
1 June 1944	John Curtin	Prime Minister of Australia	
30 June 1944	Peter Fraser	Prime Minister of New Zealand	
19 November 1945	Clement Attlee	Prime Minister of the United Kingdom	
11 June 1947	Harry S. Truman	President of the United States	
24 October 1949	Jawaharlal Nehru	Prime Minister of India	
31 May 1950	Liaquat Ali Khan	Prime Minister of Pakistan	
5 April 1951	Vincent Auriol	President of France	
14 November 1953	Dwight D. Eisenhower	President of the United States	
6 February 1956	Anthony Eden	Prime Minister of the United Kingdom	
5 March 1956	Giovanni Gronchi	President of Italy	
5 June 1956	Sukarno	President of Indonesia	
4 March 1957	Guy Mollet	Prime Minister of France	
2 June 1958	Theodor Heuss	President of West Germany	
13 June 1958	Harold Macmillan	Prime Minister of the United Kingdom	
9 July 1958	Dwight D. Eisenhower	President of the United States	
21 July 1958	Kwame Nkrumah	Prime Minister of Ghana	
17 May 1961	John F. Kennedy	President of the United States	
26 May 1964	U Thant	Secretary-General of the United Nations	
14 April 1972	Richard Nixon	President of the United States	
30 March 1973	Luis Echeverría	President of Mexico	
19 June 1973	Indira Gandhi	Prime Minister of India	
5 May 1980	Masayoshi Ohira	Prime Minister of Japan	
26 May 1980	José López Portillo	President of Mexico	
11 March 1981	Ronald Reagan	President of the United States	
26 September 1983	Margaret Thatcher	Prime Minister of the United Kingdom	
17 January 1984	Zhao Ziyang	Premier of the People's Republic of China	
8 May 1984	Miguel de la Madrid	President of Mexico	
7 March 1985	Javier Pérez de Cuéllar	Secretary-General of the United Nations	
13 January 1986	Yasuhiro Nakasone	Prime Minister of Japan	
6 April 1987	Ronald Reagan	President of the United States	
25 May 1987	François Mitterrand	President of France	
10 May 1988	Beatrix	Queen of the Netherlands	
16 June 1988	Helmut Kohl	Chancellor of West Germany	
22 June 1988	Margaret Thatcher	Prime Minister of the United Kingdom	
27 June 1989	Chaim Herzog	President of Israel	
11 October 1989	Hussein	King of Jordan	
18 June 1990	Nelson Mandela	Deputy President of the African National Congress	
8 April 1991	Carlos Salinas de Gortari	President of Mexico	
19 June 1992	Boris Yeltsin	President of Russia	
23 February 1995	Bill Clinton	President of the United States	
11 June 1996	Ernesto Zedillo	President of Mexico	
24 September 1998	Nelson Mandela	President of South Africa	
29 April 1999	Václav Havel	President of the Czech Republic	
22 February 2001	Tony Blair	Prime Minister of the United Kingdom	
9 March 2004	Kofi Annan	Secretary-General of the United Nations	
25 October 2004	Vicente Fox	President of Mexico	
18 May 2006	John Howard	Prime Minister of Australia	
22 September 2006	Hamid Karzai	President of Afghanistan	
26 May 2008	Viktor Yushchenko	President of Ukraine	
26 May 2010	Felipe Calderón	President of Mexico	
22 September 2011	David Cameron	Prime Minister of the United Kingdom	
27 February 2014	Aga Khan IV	Imam of Nizari Isma'ilism	
17 September 2014	Petro Poroshenko	President of Ukraine	
3 November 2014	François Hollande	President of France	
29 June 2016	Barack Obama	President of the United States	
12 April 2017	Malala Yousafzai	Nobel Peace Prize laureate	
25 October 2018	Mark Rutte	Prime Minister of the Netherlands	
15 March 2022	Volodymyr Zelenskyy	President of Ukraine	
7 March 2023	Ursula von der Leyen	President of the European Commission	
24 March 2023	Joe Biden	President of the United States	
22 September 2023	Volodymyr Zelenskyy	President of Ukraine	

=== Winston Churchill ===
During the Second World War, Winston Churchill, Prime Minister of the United Kingdom, stopped in Ottawa after meetings with the United States government in Washington, D.C. Churchill spoke to a joint meeting of Canada’s parliamentarians in the House of Commons on 30 December 1941, delivering an "electrifying address that stirs the passions and strengthens the resolve of a nation at war." In responding to a French general's claim that, "England will have her neck wrung like a chicken" in three weeks time from a German invasion, Churchill declared, "some chicken! Some neck!" The response was met by a roar of laughter and thunderous applause. Churchill would go on to lead the Allied effort to victory in the Second World War.

=== Richard Nixon ===
President of the United States Richard Nixon arrived in Ottawa on a state visit on 13 April 1972. He met with Governor General Roland Michener and Prime Minister Pierre Trudeau before addressing a joint meeting of the Parliament of Canada. Nixon, invoking his Nixon Doctrine on foreign policy, struck a blunt tone in his remarks. "Canadians and Americans [must] move beyond the sentimental rhetoric of the past. It is time for us to recognize that we have very separate identities [...] Each nation must determine the path of its own progress." Bruce Muirhead wrote that, after the state visit, "Nixon returned to Washington with a reinforced dislike of Ottawa, Trudeau, and most things Canadian. He told his chief of staff, H.R. Haldeman, that he had put it to these people for kicking the US around after what we did for that lousy son of a bitch [Trudeau]. Wasting three days up there. That trip we needed like a hole in the head."

=== Ronald Reagan ===
After meeting with Prime Minister Pierre Trudeau, American president Ronald Reagan addressed a joint session of Canadian Parliament on 11 March 1981, speaking humbly about the strong Canada-US relationship. "America counts many friends across the globe, surely we have no better friend than Canada." Reagan even demonstrated his ability to use both of Canada’s official languages when he spoke several phrases in French. The President concluded his remarks by offering an olive branch to the people of Canada: "We're happy to be your neighbour. We want to remain your friend. We're determined to be your partner and we're intent on working closely with you in a spirit of cooperation." Reagan addressed a joint session of the Canadian Parliament once more as president, in 1987.

=== Margaret Thatcher ===
Margaret Thatcher. then-Prime Minister of the United Kingdom, addressed Parliament on 26 September 1983. Only one year after the patriation of the Canadian constitution, Thatcher recognized that, "a constitutional link has, quite properly, been severed," but Canada and the United Kingdom are still linked in important ways, including the belief "in the same high and honourable ideals", like freedom, justice, and parliamentary democracy. In 2013, after a 30-year ban on classified Cabinet files had expired, documents from the British National Archives revealed that, prior to her trip to Ottawa, Thatcher had been briefed to be careful of Prime Minister Pierre Trudeau's "unsound personal views" and of Canadians "inordinately sensitive" nature. Thatcher returned to Canada in 1988 and, at the invitation of Prime Minister Brian Mulroney, addressed Parliament again.

=== Nelson Mandela ===
Mere months after being released from 27 years prison, South Africa's Nelson Mandela became only the fourth person who was not a head of state or head of government to address a joint session of the Parliament of Canada. Mandela thanked Prime Minister Brian Mulroney and the government of Canada for its strong opposition to the apartheid regime in South Africa and pleaded to keep the sanctions in place to pressure the South African government towards reform. In 1998, Mandela returned to address the Canadian Parliament as the first democratically elected president of South Africa.

=== Aga Khan ===
Prime Minister Stephen Harper invited the Aga Khan to address Canada’s Parliament in February 2014. The spiritual leader and 49th hereditary Imam of the Shia Imami Ismaili Muslims spoke of the "unprecedented honour" to speak in the House of Commons and called Canada an "exemplary leader" in the "global effort to foster peace, prosperity, and equality through pluralism." The Aga Khan was bestowed honorary Canadian citizenship and, fresh after the 2014 Winter Olympics, joked that he hoped be asked to join the Canadian Olympic hockey team.

=== Barack Obama ===
Immediately following the trilateral Three Amigos Summit afternoon press conference in Ottawa, Prime Minister Justin Trudeau invited United States president Barack Obama to deliver a joint address speech to the Parliament of Canada on the early evening of June 29, 2016. Obama delivered a portrait of the "extraordinary alliance and deep friendship between Canadians and Americans." Nearing the end of his tenure, and fresh off the Brexit vote in the United Kingdom, Obama spoke in defence of the international liberal order in the face of rising isolationist sentiment around the world. Obama spoke in support of Trudeau's progressive leadership when he said that, "While my time in office may soon be nearing an end, but I know that Canada—and the world—will benefit from your [Trudeau’s] leadership [sic] for years to come." The President also quoted the Prime Minister's late father, Pierre Trudeau: "A country is not something you build as the pharaohs built the pyramids [...] A country is something that is built every day out of certain basic shared values." This was Obama’s second visit to Canada since February 19, 2009, but his first time addressing a joint session of Parliament.

== See also ==
- Speech from the Throne
- Joint session of the United States Congress
- United States presidential visits to Canada
- List of people who have addressed both Houses of the United Kingdom Parliament
