= Dan Jessup =

Canadian politician (1890–1967)

Dan W. Jessup

Mayor of Sudbury, Ontario
- In office 1952–1954
- Preceded by: William S. Beaton
- Succeeded by: Leo Landreville

Personal details
- Born: 1890 Clear Lake, Ontario
- Died: February 23, 1967 (aged 76–77) Madrid, Spain
- Occupation: Entrepreneur

Dan W. Jessup (1890 – February 23, 1967) was a Canadian politician, who served as mayor of Sudbury, Ontario. He was first elected to the mayor's office on December 3, 1951 and served for three terms as mayor in 1952, 1953 and 1954. In 1955 he was succeeded by Leo Landreville, a local lawyer who was later appointed to the Supreme Court of Ontario as a judge.

In addition to Jessup's three terms as mayor, he also served on city council. He was first elected to office in 1926 and served with Mayor Samson on city council. He subsequently served another four terms; 1927, 1928, 1928 and 1932.

He died at the age of 77, while on vacation in Madrid, Spain on February 23, 1967.

== Sudbury City Council (1952–1954) ==
=== Sudbury City Council 1952 ===
The following is the list of Aldermen who served with Mayor Jessup on Sudbury's City Council in 1952. They were elected to their respective offices on December 3, 1951.

Sudbury City Council 1952
Fournier Ward	McCormick Ward	Ryan Ward
Emile Savard	Frank Barlow	Gene Coe
Alphege Theriault	G. J. Monaghan	T. G. Thompson
O. Godin	James Cormack	Gene Biondi

=== Sudbury City Council 1953 ===
The following is the list of Aldermen who served with Mayor Jessup on Sudbury's City Council in 1953. They were elected to their respective offices on December 1, 1952.

Sudbury City Council 1953
Fournier Ward	McCormick Ward	Ryan Ward
Emile Savard	James Cormack	Gene Coe
Alphege Theriault	H. Waisberg	Joe Fabbro
Vic Whalen	Grace Hartman	Ken McNeill

=== Sudbury City Council 1954 ===
The following is the list of Aldermen who served with Mayor Jessup on Sudbury's City Council in 1954.

Sudbury City Council 1954
Fournier Ward	McCormick Ward	Ryan Ward
Albert Gravel	James Cormack	Gene Coe
Alphege Theriault	Samuel Rothschild	Joe Fabbro
Vic Whalen	Grace Hartman	Ken McNeill

== Board of Control (1952–1954) ==
=== Board of Control 1952 ===
The 1951 election marked the first year that the City of Sudbury was overseen by a board of control for the inaugural year of 1952. The members were:

- L. Lamoureux
- J. W. Tate
- S. Silverman
- W. E. W. Cressey

=== Board of Control 1953 ===
The following is the list of members of the Board of Control who served with Mayor Jessup on Sudbury's Board of Control in 1953.

- L. Lamoureux
- G. Monaghan
- Ray Jessup
- J. W. Tate

=== Board of Control 1954 ===
The following is the list of members of the Board of Control who served with Mayor Jessup on Sudbury's Broad of Control in 1953.

- L. Lamoureux
- G. Monaghan
- Ray Jessup
- S. Racicot

== Books ==
- Dorian, Charles (1961). The First 75 Years, A Headline History of Sudbury, Canada. Arthur H. Stockwell Limited, Ilfracombe, Devon.
- Wallace, C. M.; & Thomson, Ashley (Eds.) (1993). Sudbury: Rail Town to Regional Capital (3rd ed.). Dundurn Press. ISBN 978-1-55002-170-7.
