= Peter Fenton (politician) =

Canadian politician (1886–1953)

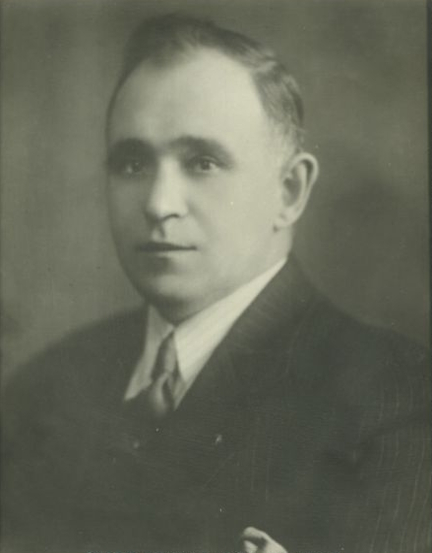
- Fenton, c. 1930

Mayor of Sudbury, Ontario, Canada
- In office 1930–1932
- Preceded by: Charles Bibby
- Succeeded by: W. Marr Brodie

Personal details
- Born: May 12, 1886 Dunfermline, Scotland
- Died: October 5, 1953 (aged 67) Sudbury, Ontario, Canada
- Occupation: contractor, insurance adjuster

Peter Fenton (May 12, 1886 – October 5, 1953) was a Canadian politician, who served as mayor of Sudbury, Ontario from 1930 to 1932. He was the 17th mayor of Sudbury since its incorporation in 1893, and the first mayor of Sudbury after it was granted city status in 1930. On November 27, 1929 he was acclaimed mayor of the city due to the lack of candidates running for office in the 1929 election. In 1930 he stood again for mayor. During the election campaign he promised to build a new town hall and a subway under the Elm Street rail line, along with improving the local utilities in conjunction with municipal services. His campaign slogan was "Sudbury is a progressive city; we should be optimists and boasters, not pessimists and knockers".

Fenton was widely regarded as a populist mayor and a worthy political opponent. On December 1, 1930, he won the election with 1,373 votes, the largest win in a municipal election in Sudbury at that time.

He was successful at incorporating the city and building the Sudbury Jail, and did the best he could to enable the City of Sudbury to provide relief to citizens affected by the Great Depression. He converted the former jail into a flop house, and was able to provide relief to 4,142 recipients in December 1930. However, in an effort to encourage the recipients to "find work", meals were gradually cut back from three meals to one meal per day by March 1931.

Despite his attempts at advocating for the impoverished citizens of Sudbury, his spending and confrontational style eventually thrust him out of office amid some controversy. Known for unilaterally making decisions on council and running a deficit, he was defeated in 1932 by W. Marr Brodie. Brodie was successful at demanding stricter practices in administering the city's welfare programs, the issue which cost Fenton the election. The ballots cast were 3,138 to 1,591, a clear margin of victory for Brodie.

== Background ==
Peter Fenton arrived to Canada 1905 with nothing but his clothing and his tool box. A builder by trade, he worked in Hamilton for two years and then subsequently moved to Sudbury in 1907. By 1913 he was employed as an insurance adjuster. Fenton would often recall that he arrived in Sudbury when the population was 4,000 and by the time he was mayor the city had grown to 20,000.

Fenton served for eight years on city council before being acclaimed to the mayor's office in 1929.

In 1950 Fenton ran unsuccessfully against William S. Beaton, Sudbury's mayor from 1941 to 1951.

== Sudbury City Council (1930-1932) ==
=== City Council 1930 ===
The following is the list of Aldermen who served with Mayor Fenton on Sudbury's City Council in 1930.

The 1930 city council was acclaimed due to the lack of qualified candidates as such the following list of Aldermen were acclaimed to their offices in the 1930. F.C Muirhead, Leo J. Robert and James Newburn were elected to their offices in the Sudbury Municipal Election of 1928.

Prior to 1930 Alderman who were elected were elected to serve the city and were not elected to serve a specific ward. This process was changed in the Sudbury Municipal Election of 1930.

From 1930 on, three Alderman were elected for each ward, and the Alderman had to be residents from the ward in which they represented. This rule came into effect to ensure that the interests of each ward were proportionally represented on Sudbury City Council.

Sudbury City Council 1930
J. B. Ducharme	J. W. Brownlee	Fred Davison
Leo J. Robert	James Newburn	F. C. Muirhead

=== City Council 1931 ===
The following is the list of Aldermen who served with Mayor Fenton on Sudbury's City Council in 1931. They were elected to their respective offices on December 1, 1930.

Sudbury City Council 1931
Fournier Ward	McCormick Ward	Ryan Ward
J. B. Ducharme	Earl A. Martin	Dan Jessup
W. L. Laforest	J. Fred Woods	William J. Cullen
Paul Savard	J. Newburn	A. Gustiana

=== City Council 1932 ===
The following is the list of Aldermen who served with Mayor Fenton on Sudbury's City Council in 1932.

Sudbury City Council 1932
Fournier Ward	McCormick Ward	Ryan Ward
W. J. Boivin	W. Marr Brodie	Dan Jessup
Paul Savard	C. Carrington	D. H. Andress
Oscar Noel DeTilly	J. D. McInnes	W. J. Barager

== Books ==
- Dorian, Charles (1961). The First 75 Years, A Headline History of Sudbury, Canada. Arthur H. Stockwell Limited, Ilfracombe, Devon.
- Wallace, C. M.; & Thomson, Ashley (Eds.) (1993). Sudbury: Rail Town to Regional Capital (3rd ed.). Dundurn Press. ISBN 978-1-55002-170-7.
