= 2023 Sikh protests =

Protests from February to October 2023

- Part of the Khalistan movement
- Date: February – October 2023
- Location: India; Australia; Canada; Italy; New Zealand; United Kingdom; United States
- Caused by: Arrest of Lovepreet Toofan Singh in February 2023; Arrest of Amritpal Singh in March 2023; Assassination of Hardeep Singh Nijjar in June 2023
- Methods: Demonstrations, blockades and rallies

Parties
Khalistanis; Nihangs; Waris Punjab De	Government of India

The 2023 Sikh protests were a series of rallies from February to October 2023. They began following a registration of a first information report (FIR) in the Ajnala police station against Khalistan separatist leader Amritpal Singh and his aides for purported kidnapping and theft. Singh's close associate Lovepreet Toofan Singh was detained, prompting Amritpal Singh to issue an "ultimatum" to Punjab Police to revoke the case, and, upon their unresponsiveness, his supporters thereafter started mass protests and stormed the police complex with weapons. Although Lovepreet Toofan Singh was subsequently released, Punjab Police launched a crackdown on Amritpal Singh for obstruction of law enforcement. This resulted in a series of demonstrations led by Sikhs in India, as well as diasporic Sikhs.

The second phase of the protests began in June 2023, following the murder of Hardeep Singh Nijjar, another Khalistani separatist, in Canada. In July, Khalistani supporters set the Indian consulate in San Francisco on fire, which was later suppressed by the San Francisco Fire Department. In September 2023, Canadian prime minister Justin Trudeau declared India to be involved in the killing of Nijjar, which was denied by the Indian government. These issues led to the ongoing Canada–India diplomatic row. Sikhs activists in the United States led demonstrated in cities like Chicago, Los Angeles, San Francisco, Sacramento and New York City.

== Background ==
On 18 March 2023, Indian authorities launched a manhunt for Amritpal Singh after he was accused by police of attempted murder, obstruction of law enforcement and creating "disharmony" in society.

During the manhunt, Indian authorities deployed thousands of paramilitary police and restricted mobile Internet and mobile messaging services for nearly 30 million people across the Punjab state. Indian authorities also arrested more than 200 people while conducting a massive manhunt. Meanwhile, Singh was nowhere to be found.

After more than a month, on 23 April 2023, Singh was arrested from Rode village in Moga district, Punjab. Later, he was taken to the high-security Dibrugarh jail in Assam state.

== Events ==
On 15 March 2023, the Honorary Consulate of India located in Brisbane, Australia, was forced to temporarily shut down after Khalistan supporters blockaded the entry.

On 19 March 2023, Singh's supporters pulled down the Indian flag and waved the Khalistan flag instead at the India House, London. They also broke a window. In reaction India summoned Britain's most senior diplomat and removed barricades outside of the British High Commission in New Delhi. Two security guards suffered minor injury and a protester was later arrested in connection to the incident.

In Mohali, Punjab and Sohana Chowk hundreds of protesters under the Kaumi Insaaf Morcha blocked important roads to the airport. Heavy police deployment occurred with multiple high-ranking officers arriving to the site. Some left after leaders requested the protest end but many stayed. The protest led to delays in traffic. Some protesters created stone and brick walls which blocked service lanes and slip roads bring the traffic to a full halt. Nihangs were there on horses brandishing weapons. All traffic coming from Chandigarh had been diverted as police barracatied all four doors leading to Sohana Chowk. After three days of the roads being blocked on 22 March police cleared the protesters arresting 25 people. Police also seized weapons including swords, farm tools, and spears. The Superintendent of Police (SP), Navreet Singh Varak was injured along with four other officers.

On 20 March 2023, the supporters of the Khalistan movement also vandalized the Indian Consulate in San Francisco with a graffiti reading '#FreeAmritpal'. In Surrey a protest was held at the Taj Park Convention Centre where the Indian High Commissioner was to be welcomed. Sameer Kaushal a journalist and new director was assaulted. In Vancouver, a small group of UBC students protested outside Walter C. Koerner Library. The protesters later joined a bigger rally outside of the Vancouver Art Gallery.

On 25 March 2023, about 500 people rallied to protest crackdowns targeting Sikhs in Punjab, India at the Consulate General of India in Vancouver, Canada. Moninder Singh a spokesman for the British Columbia Gurdwara Council said, “We're here to show our dissent, our displeasure against the Indian state for this suspension of civil liberties and violation of human rights". A small group held a protest on the same day outside the North Peace Cultural Centre in Fort St. John to, “raise awareness against ongoing human rights violations in Punjab.”

On 26 March 2023, a protest was held outside the Indian embassy in Washington, D.C. The Press Trust of India's Washington D.C-based Chief, Lalit K. Jha, was hit by protesters. He described the assault saying, "The gentleman... hit my left ear with these two sticks and earlier I had to call 911 and rushed [to a] police van [for] safety fearing a public assault."

On 27 March 2023, the Akal Takht held a gathering with over 50 Sikh organisations. After they gave an ultimatum to the Punjab Government which was to release all Sikhs arrested in the past 10 days within 24 hours. The Akal Takht further announced it would launch its own Vaheer if the demand is not met. The Akal Takht also announced it would give financial assistance to the families of those who have been charged under the NSA act. Along with this protests were held outside the Akal Takht and Golden Temple.

On 27 March 2023, a protest was held in Toronto outside the Indian consulate where an Indian flag was burned. Another protest was held in Times Square, New York City. Protesters held a car rally. The protesters had an LED billboard truck showing Amritpal Singh. They also had purchased billboards in Times Square which showed Amritpal Singh along with Jarnail Singh Bhindranwale.

On 18 June 2023, Hardeep Singh Nijjar was assassinated in Surrey, Canada. This amplified issues between Sikhs and Hindus, with Khalistani protestors going as far as to set the Indian consulate in San Francisco on fire. The arson attempt was promptly suppressed by the San Francisco Fire Department, resulting in limited damage to the building and no injuries to the staffers present. The incident was condemned by the State Department's spokesman Matthew Miller.

In September 2023, Prime Minister Justin Trudeau said Canadian security agencies have opened an investigation into Nijjar's killing, which officers suspect of having been ordered by the Indian government. This was denied by India, and these issues led to a diplomatic row between the two countries. On 1 September 2024, the organization, Sikhs for Justice, held a rally in Toronto. Floats within the parade glorified Dilawar Singh Babbar, a suicide bomber affiliated with Babbar Khalsa International (a banned organization in Canada), who killed former Punjab chief minister Beant Singh and numerous other bystanders. A sign at the rally read "Beanta Bombed to Death". SFJ described Babbar as a "human bomb". SFJ's general counsel in a statement said:"We are all offspring of Dilawar. At that time in 1995, the choice of weapon was a bomb, but we have choice of ballot today.” Some attendees chanted "Kill India" at the rally.

In October 2024, Rishi Nagar, a Canadian radio host of Calgary Red FM, reported on an incident at Gurdwara Dashmesh Culture Centre, a Sikh temple in Calgary, in which two men were arrested on various firearms related charges, including unauthorized possession of a firearm and pointing a firearm; multiple guns were seized by the police at the site. Following the report, Nagar was assaulted by two men. Calgary Police's Staff Sergeant John Guigon described the assault as “particularly troubling to us when a member of the media gets attacked in a democracy”. Calgary Red FM stated that Nagar "faced some blowback for his opposition to the Khalistan movement".

== Reaction ==
In March 2023, Canada's High Commissioner was summoned by India to "convey strong concern" over Sikh protesters in Canada.

In September 2023, on the sidelines of the G20 summit in New Delhi, the Indian Prime Minister Narendra Modi conveyed concerns about the protests in Canada to Canadian Prime Minister Justin Trudeau.
