= Joe Fabbro =

Canadian politician (1914–1978)

Mayor of Sudbury, Ontario
- In office 1957–1959
- Preceded by: Leo Landreville
- Succeeded by: Bill Edgar
- In office 1964–1965
- Preceded by: William Ellis
- Succeeded by: Max Silverman
- In office 1968–1975
- Preceded by: Grace Hartman
- Succeeded by: Jim Gordon

Regional Chair of Sudbury, Ontario
- In office 1976–1978
- Preceded by: Don Collins
- Succeeded by: Doug Frith

Personal details
- Born: June 14, 1914 Sudbury, Ontario
- Died: January 16, 1978 (aged 63) Sudbury, Ontario

Joseph J. Fabbro (June 14, 1914 – January 16, 1978) was a Canadian politician, who served as mayor of Sudbury, Ontario from 1957 to 1959, 1964 to 1965 and 1968 to 1975, and as chair of the Regional Municipality of Sudbury from 1975 to 1977.

Fabbro also ran as a Progressive Conservative candidate in the Sudbury electoral district in the 1975 provincial election, but was not elected.

In January 1978, Fabbro died at the age of 63 of a heart attack.

== Sudbury City Council 1957 ==
The following is the list of aldermen who served with Mayor Fabbro on Sudbury's City Council in 1957.

Sudbury City Council 1957
Fournier Ward	McCormick Ward	Ryan Ward
F. Guimond	J. Cormack	W. Baby
A. Lapalme	C. G. Caswell	H. McDonald
A. Theriault	W. C. Jarrett	G. Waddell
