= Grace Hartman (politician) =

Canadian politician (1900–1998)

Mayor of Sudbury, Ontario
- In office 1966–1967
- Preceded by: Max Silverman
- Succeeded by: Joe Fabbro

Personal details
- Born: Grace Armstrong; 1900 Markdale, Ontario, Canada
- Died: May 23, 1998 (aged 97–98) Toronto, Ontario, Canada

Grace Hartman OOnt (née Armstrong; 1900 – May 23, 1998), was a Canadian social activist and politician in Sudbury, Ontario, Canada, who became the city's first female mayor. She became mayor on October 18, 1966 when she was selected by city council following the death of the city's previous mayor, Max Silverman. However, in the municipal elections the following year, Hartman was defeated when the city's popular longtime mayor Joe Fabbro, Silverman's predecessor, stood for election again.

Hartman had previously campaigned for mayor in 1956, losing to Fabbro.

In addition to the distinction of being the first woman to serve as mayor in the City of Sudbury, Hartman also shares the distinction with Dr. Faustina Kelly Cook of being one of the first women to serve on Sudbury City Council. They were both elected to Sudbury City Council on December 4, 1950. She served on council until 1954, when she was elected the city's comptroller.

Hartman was also a president of the Ontario Municipal Association, a board member of the Royal Ontario Museum, and a chair of several social service and community organizations in Sudbury.

She was born in Markdale, Ontario, and moved to Sudbury after marrying George Hartman in 1938. George Hartman died in 1960; Grace subsequently married Arthur Grout in 1969.

In 1975, Hartman was named one of the 25 leading women of Ontario.

In the late 1970s, Hartman and Grout retired to Toronto, although Hartman returned to Sudbury several times, to accept an honorary doctorate from Laurentian University and a lifetime achievement award from the city's business and professional women's association.

Hartman died at Mount Sinai Hospital in Toronto on May 23, 1998.

In 2001, the outdoor amphitheatre at the city's Bell Park, the site of the annual Northern Lights Festival Boréal, was named the Grace Hartman Amphitheatre in her memory. Creating the amphitheatre had been one of Hartman's key projects during her city council term.
