= Independent candidates in the 1999 Ontario provincial election =

There were a number of independent candidates in the 1999 Ontario provincial election, none of whom were elected.

== Candidates ==
=== Peterborough: Kenneth T. Burgess ===
Kenneth T. Burgess was a school teacher in Toronto before moving to Peterborough and was the creator of a self-help teaching service. He was a perennial candidate, having run for public office on at least six occasions. He died in May 2001.

He took the Peterborough County School Board to court in 1989, after the board appointed an unelected replacement to fill a vacancy. He argued that either a by-election should have been called, or he should have been appointed as the runner-up candidate from the last board election. (The chair of the board responded that the appointment of another applicant was appropriate and that a by-election would have been "extremely expensive.") Burgess was later convicted of forging some of the signatures on his nomination papers when he ran for school trustee again in the 1991 municipal election. Because of this conviction, he was barred from running for Mayor of Peterborough in 1997.

Burgess was sixty-five years old during his final run for office in 2000. During this election, he called for the City of Peterborough to offer free land to create development and reduce business tax levels. Incumbent mayor Sylvia Sutherland dismissed this practice as being illegal in Ontario.

He is not to be confused with Ken Burgess, a former mayor Brandon, Manitoba.

Electoral record
Election	Division	Party	Votes	%	Place	Winner
1981 provincial	Peterborough	Independent	59	0.15	6/6	John Turner, Progressive Conservative
1985 municipal	Mayor of Peterborough	n/a				Sylvia Sutherland
1988 municipal	school trustee	n/a				
1991 municipal	school trustee	n/a				
1999 provincial	Peterborough	Independent	125	0.23	6/7	Gary Stewart, Progressive Conservative
2000 municipal	Mayor of Peterborough	n/a	252	0.93	4/4	Sylvia Sutherland

=== Sudbury: Ed Pokonzie ===
Ed Pokonzie was a perennial candidate for political office, having campaigned in federal, provincial and municipal elections. He first ran for election municipally in 1991.

Pokonzie was a city employee and labourer in Calgary, Alberta in the early 1980s. He was fired in 1981 for failing to pass a "permanency" medical test, and later became involved in a complicated legal challenge regarding his dismissal. He then moved to Ontario, and settled in the city of Sudbury. He launched a $5 million lawsuit against the Government of Ontario in 1999, citing wrongful treatment over his failure to obtain compensation for workplace injuries. The suit was dismissed in 2004. In 2000, Pokonzie identified himself as a former truck driver on a disability pension.

Pokonzie is often described as a social activist, and has called for a grassroots approach to city politics. He was an early supporter of amalgamation, though he also called for smaller centres to retain their local identity in the new city of Greater Sudbury. He also supported a light transit system, and pay-for-service assessment. Pokonzie called for the municipal administration to be restructured in 2003, arguing that there were six different agencies overseeing water quality without anyone having effective management authority.

Pokonzie is known for wearing a beret bedecked with medals while campaigning.

Electoral record
Election	Division	Party	Votes	%	Place	Winner
1991 municipal						
1993 federal	Sudbury	Independent	129	0.30	8/9	Diane Marleau, Liberal
1995 provincial	Sudbury	Independent	123	0.40	7/7	Rick Bartolucci, Liberal
1997 municipal	Regional Chair					Peter Wong
1998 municipal by-election	Regional Chair					Frank Mazzuca
1999 provincial	Sudbury	Independent	159	0.43	5/6	Rick Bartolucci, Liberal
2000 municipal	Mayor of Greater Sudbury	n/a	not listed	<1	5/6	Jim Gordon
2003 municipal	Mayor of Greater Sudbury	n/a	67	0.12	13/14	David Courtemanche
2006 municipal	Mayor of Greater Sudbury	n/a	92	0.17	6/7	John Rodriguez

=== Windsor—St. Clair: Ralph Kirchner ===
Kirchner was 28 years old at the time of the election, a lifelong Windsor resident, and a Chrysler worker. On announcing his candidacy, he promised to bring more democracy to the political system if elected. Kirchner advocated expanding the public health care system to cover dental care, prescription drugs and eyeglasses. He denied being a radical in his views, and claimed he entered the race out of frustration with Ontario's partisan system. (Windsor Star, 19 May 1999) He received 263 votes (0.68%), finishing fifth out of six candidates. The winner was Dwight Duncan of the Ontario Liberal Party.

== By-election candidates ==
=== Beaches—East York, 20 September 2001: Kevin Mark Clarke ===
Clarke was a perennial candidate for public office in Toronto.
