= Diane Marleau =

Canadian politician (1943–2013)

The Honourable Diane Marleau PC

Member of the Canadian House of Commons for Sudbury
- In office December 12, 1988 – September 7, 2008
- Preceded by: Doug Frith
- Succeeded by: Glenn Thibeault

Minister for International Cooperation in the Government of Canada
- In office June 11, 1997 – August 2, 1999
- Preceded by: Don Boudria
- Succeeded by: Maria Minna

Minister responsible for La Francophonie in the Government of Canada
- In office June 11, 1997 – August 2, 1999
- Preceded by: Don Boudria
- Succeeded by: Ron Duhamel

Minister of Public Works and Government Services in the Government of Canada
- In office July 12, 1996 – June 10, 1997
- Preceded by: legislation enacted
- Succeeded by: Alfonso Gagliano

Minister of Public Works in the Government of Canada
- In office January 25, 1996 – July 11, 1996
- Preceded by: David Dingwall
- Succeeded by: legislation enacted

Minister of Supply and Services in the Government of Canada
- In office January 25, 1996 – July 11, 1996
- Preceded by: David Dingwall
- Succeeded by: legislation enacted

Minister of National Health and Welfare in the Government of Canada
- In office November 4, 1993 – January 24, 1996
- Preceded by: Mary Collins
- Succeeded by: David Dingwall

Minister of Amateur Sport in the Government of Canada
- In office November 4, 1993 – January 24, 1996
- Preceded by: Mary Collins
- Succeeded by: David Dingwall

Parliamentary secretary to the President of the Treasury Board in the Government of Canada
- In office July 20, 2004 – February 5, 2006
- Preceded by: Joe Jordan
- Succeeded by: Pierre Poilievre

Parliamentary secretary to the Minister responsible for the Canadian Wheat Board in the Government of Canada
- In office July 20, 2004 – February 5, 2006
- Preceded by: position created
- Succeeded by: David L. Anderson

Member of the Sudbury City Council and the Regional Municipality of Sudbury Council
- In office 1980–1985

Personal details
- Born: Diane Paulette Lebel; June 21, 1943 Kirkland Lake, Ontario
- Died: January 30, 2013 (aged 69) Sudbury, Ontario, Canada
- Party: Liberal
- Spouse: Paul Marleau
- Profession: Accountant

Diane Marleau, PC MP (June 21, 1943 – January 30, 2013) was a Canadian politician. She represented the riding of Sudbury in the House of Commons of Canada from 1988 to 2008, and was a cabinet minister in the government of Jean Chrétien. Marleau was a member of the Liberal Party of Canada.

She was married to Paul Marleau, a prominent businessman in Sudbury who ran for mayor of the city in the 2003 municipal election.

== Early life and career ==
Marleau was born Diane Paulette Lebel in Kirkland Lake, Ontario, one of three children raised by a single mother in a low-income household. She was a childhood friend of Marie-Paule Charette, who later became a Senator and president of the Liberal Party.

Marleau studied commerce at the University of Ottawa, but left after three years when she married fellow student Paul Marleau, with whom she had three children: Brigitte, Donald and Stéphane, and moved to Sudbury. She worked as the secretary to a medical doctor for five years, prior to the introduction of Medicare. She later said that this experience made her realize the importance of a publicly funded health system, saying "I was the one who had to collect the bills. It gave me an understanding of what it means when people are obliged to pay to see a doctor."

Marleau returned to Laurentian University as a mature student, and completed a Bachelor's Degree in Economics (1976). She worked as an accountant, managed an office for a firm of chartered accountants (Thorne and Riddell and then with Collins, Barrow-Maheux Noiseux), and operated a restaurant she co-owned with her husband. She also served on the boards of Laurentian University and Laurentian Hospital. Marleau worked on Judy Erola's campaign in the 1980 federal election, and later credited Erola as a role model for her own career in public life.

== Municipal politics ==
Marleau entered politics at the municipal level, serving as a Sudbury alderman and a Regional Municipality of Sudbury councillor from 1980 to 1985. She chaired the city's Finance Committee, and backed a "pay as you go" debt-elimination plan that prohibited borrowing on capital investments. She served on the board of governors of Cambrian College, and was a member of the Ontario Advisory Council on Women's Issues. In 1983, she chaired the Canadian Games for Physically Disabled.

After the 1985 provincial election, Ontario Liberal Party leader David Peterson appointed Marleau to a ten-member transition team that assisted the party as it formed government for the first time in 42 years. She ran for Mayor of Sudbury in the 1985 municipal elections, and lost to incumbent Peter Wong. She was asked to run for the Ontario Liberal Party in the 1987 provincial election, but declined. Marleau was considered to be on the right wing of the Liberal Party in this period, although she later identified with a more left-wing position.

== Member of Parliament ==
Marleau was first elected to the House of Commons in the 1988 federal election. The Progressive Conservative Party under Brian Mulroney won a majority government in this election, and Marleau served in the Official Opposition as critic for Energy, Mines and Resources. She supported Jean Chrétien's successful bid for the party leadership in 1990, and was appointed to a five-person working group to design the party's tax policy. She was named deputy Liberal whip in 1991, and became associate finance critic in 1992. Marleau criticized Bank of Canada governor John Crow during this period, arguing that his high interest rate policy was driving the economy into a recession.

=== Cabinet minister ===
Minister of Health

The Liberals won a majority government in 1993 federal election, and incoming Prime Minister Jean Chrétien appointed Marleau as Minister of National Health and Welfare and Minister of Amateur Sport on November 4, 1993. This came as a surprise to many political observers, as Marleau did not have the national profile normally associated with Health portfolio. Some have speculated that Chrétien originally planned to appoint Marleau as Minister of National Revenue, and assigned her to Health as a late replacement for Sheila Copps and/or Hedy Fry.

Public health care

Marleau is a vocal supporter of public medicare. As Health Minister, she once said that she opposed user fees on the grounds that they discourage poor people from seeking medical treatment until the advanced stages of illness.

She intervened on more than one occasion to ensure that provincial governments upheld the principles of the Canada Health Act. Marleau withheld $750,000 in transfer payments to British Columbia in April 1994, after some doctors in that province extra-billed their patients for services. She defended this decision by arguing that it was inappropriate for taxpayers to subsidize private medicine. The British Columbia government supported her decision, and pledged to work with her in the future against extra-billing. Marleau also expressed concern about Ontario's cuts to out-of-country hospital insurance in the same period, though she added that her government could do little to intervene in this particular situation.

Marleau later took action to stop provincial governments from funding semi-private clinics that required patients to pay facility fees. This was primarily directed against Alberta, where the provincial government of Ralph Klein argued that such fees were not in violation of the Canada Health Act. In 1995, Marleau warned the Alberta government that it would face transfer cuts if it did not shut down its private eye and diagnostic clinics before a federal deadline. Alberta agreed to develop a new policy shortly before time expired. Marleau later indicated that her standoff with Alberta was opposed by some in the Prime Minister's Office, who worried about encroaching on a provincial jurisdiction during the period of the 1995 Quebec referendum. For his part, Chrétien described Marleau's stand against the Klein government as "courageous" in his 2007 memoirs.

After Marleau left the Health portfolio, the Chrétien government allowed Alberta doctors to work in both the public and private sectors by selling services not deemed "medically necessary". This did not technically constitute extra billing, as the services were not covered by medicare. Marleau opposed this decision.

Federal spending

The Chrétien government's 1995 austerity budget reduced transfer payments to the provinces, and provided lump-sum financing for health and social spending in place of separate budgetary envelopes. Marleau argued that the new approach would free the provinces to spend more money on health, and allow them to better carry out the Canada Health Act's provisions. Some critics argued that the change put medicare at risk, while others suggested it would jeopardize other social programs in favour of health spending.

Anti-smoking policy

The Chrétien government introduced a significant tax cut on tobacco in early 1994, to counter powerful smuggling rings that had emerged in Quebec. This decision was opposed by health professionals, on the grounds that it would lead to increased smoking rates among youth. Marleau personally opposed the strategy but could not prevent its implementation, a fact that undermined her reputation in the health community. She argued that the Chrétien government still favoured high tobacco taxes as a long-term strategy, and would seek to mitigate the cuts with a youth education program on the dangers of tobacco.

In April 1994, Marleau announced plans for legislation requiring that cigarettes be sold only in plain packages without corporate logos. This was strongly opposed by the tobacco industry, and ran into delays in the federal health committee. In June 1994, committee chair Roger Simmons issued a report indicating that Marleau's proposal was viable, but should be deferred pending research as to whether it would actually reduce smoking levels. A May 1995 report found no conclusive proof that plain packaging would reduce smoking, but suggested it would be effective in deterring children from starting the habit.

Marleau's plans suffered a setback later in 1995, when the Supreme Court of Canada unexpectedly struck down a law against tobacco advertising that had been passed by the Mulroney government in 1988. She expressed disappointment at the ruling, but later introduced a blueprint for new legislation that would ban all tobacco advertising and severely restrict tobacco companies from sponsoring arts and cultural events. The latter measure was opposed by some in the arts community, although polls showed that most Canadians supported the proposal.

Marleau left the Health portfolio before the legislation was introduced, and it was left to her successor David Dingwall to introduce modified legislation in late 1996. The resulting Tobacco Act was passed in early 1997.

Women's health

Marleau established a section of Canada's Health department specifically devoted to women's issues, and introduced Canada's first Centre of Excellence focused on Women's Health. She brought forward a pilot project to better inform women about breast cancer in 1994, and later introduced a program to ensure that low-income pregnant women would have access to proper nutrition and prenatal care. In 1995, she announced the first conference on women's health issues sponsored by both Canada and the United States.

Marleau received a report on new reproductive technologies shortly after her appointment as Health Minister, and welcomed its primary thesis that conception and child-bearing should not become for-profit industries. She reiterated this view in late 1994, when speaking about the need for legislation to prevent the sale of human sperm and eggs. She called for a voluntary moratorium on commercial surrogate motherhood contracts the following year, as a first step toward greater regulation. Some believed this approach fell short of the 1993 report's recommendations, and expressed concern that it would be ineffective. Marleau later acknowledged that the voluntary approach was not successful, and indicated that legislation banning the sale of human eggs was forthcoming. Her successor introduced the legislation in June 1996.

Other

In March 1994, Marleau announced that her government would legalize cannabis for commercial hemp production. In the same year, however, she introduced a bill to create a Controlled Drugs and Substances Act that would increase penalties for simple possession of marijuana. This was criticized by many in the Liberal caucus. The bill passed committee hearings more-or-less intact, but was withdrawn from the House of Commons agenda in July 1995.

Marleau introduced some programs to alleviate health problems in aboriginal communities during her tenure as Health Minister. A deal between the federal government and the Assembly of Manitoba Chiefs was delayed in early 1995, as the result of disagreements on whether First Nations health care was a treaty right.

The Chrétien government set up a 22-member National Forum on Health in 1994, with Chrétien as chair and Marleau as vice-chair. They were joined by twenty health professionals and private citizens, with a mandate that focused on matters such as the health costs associated with an aging society, patient choice and responsibility, and research priorities. Some provincial governments criticized the structure of the panel, and some in the media argued that Roy Romanow would have been a better choice for chair.

In addition to serving as Health Minister, Marleau also served on a committee of cabinet that focused on jobs and the economy.

Media coverage

Marleau's performance as Health Minister was frequently criticized in the national press. A Globe and Mail report in April 1994 argued that the government's tobacco tax cuts had made her the most undermined minister in Chrétien's cabinet. Throughout 1994 and 1995, there was frequent speculation that she would be shifted to another portfolio. One of the few occasions in which the national media supported her was during her stand against Alberta's semi-private clinics. Marleau later acknowledged that she was regarded as a weak minister after failing to stop the tobacco tax cut, but defended her overall performance by saying that she consistently stood up for public health care against powerful opposition.

Minister of Public Works

Marleau was appointed as Minister of Public Works and Minister of Supply and Services on January 25, 1996. During her term, these positions were amalgamated into the position of Minister of Public Works and Government Services. Her first major act in this portfolio was to introduce Canada's newly minted two-dollar coin at a Montreal civic landmark in February 1996.

Canada Post

In late 1996, George Radwanski submitted a report to the federal government on the future of Canada Post. Although he opposed privatisation, he argued that the crown corporation was "needlessly and unfairly" competing with the private sector in some areas. Marleau accepted Radwanski's primary findings, and said that Canada Post would withdraw from delivering most store fliers and unaddressed junk mail. Canada Post responded by announcing that it would need to dismiss almost 10,000 part-time workers, and the Canadian Union of Postal Workers held a series of protests against the government. Marleau did not endorse Radwanski's recommendation that Canada Post should concentrate solely on delivering regular mail, and also disagreed with his call for the government to sell Purolator Courier.

Shortly before the 1997 federal election, Marleau announced that the federal government would review Canada Post's urban and rural delivery services and appoint an ombudsman to oversee the corporation.

Sponsorship program

In November 1996, Marleau and Jean Chrétien sought and received $34 million from the Treasury Board of Canada for sponsorship spending earmarked toward national unity. This followed a narrow federalist victory in the 1995 Quebec referendum, and was intended to reduce the threat of Quebec separatism. The program continued under Marleau's successor, Alfonso Gagliano. Some of these funds were later discovered to have been misappropriated, leading to a national controversy known as the sponsorship scandal. Marleau subsequently testified before a public inquiry that she did not personally oversee the program, and that she had declined on procedural grounds to receive direct reports from sponsorship head Chuck Guité. Her account was confirmed by others involved in the program, and she was cleared of any wrongdoing by a commission led by Justice John Gomery.

Other

Marleau privatized the Canada Communications Group's printing, warehousing and distribution operations in 1996, but took steps to ensure that jobs, wage levels and benefits would be protected after the sale. She later warned the Ontario provincial government of Mike Harris against its plans to download social housing to the municipalities, arguing that any such move would require Ottawa's concurrence. Her successor formally rejected the Harris government's plan in July 1997.

Marleau announced that the Department of Public Works would tighten its anti-discriminatory regulations in 1996, after an employee working on repairs at the Peace Tower complained of sexual discrimination. One of her last major acts as Public Works Minister was to officially open Confederation Bridge, a permanent land link between Prince Edward Island and the rest of Canada.

Reflecting on Marleau's tenure as Public Works Minister in 2002, journalist Edward Greenspon wrote that she did not fit the profile of the "pork barrel" politician usually assigned to the portfolio and that her term in office was necessarily brief.

Minister of International Cooperation

Marleau was re-elected without difficulty in the 1997 federal election, in which the Liberals won a second consecutive majority government. On June 11, 1997, she was appointed as Minister for International Co-operation and Minister responsible for La Francophonie. Shortly after her appointment, she called on Canada to take a stronger role in developing information technology services in the global south. She later wrote a piece supporting microcredit loans, arguing that they would promote women's rights in under-developed countries.

Marleau announced in late 1997 that she would try to convince her cabinet colleagues not to proceed with a scheduled $150 million cut in international aid. She argued that the cut was initially planned as part of a deficit-fighting strategy, and said that Canada's improved financial situation made it unnecessary. The budget cuts were eventually held to $60 million, and Marleau expressed hope that no further reductions would occur in the future.

Marleau introduced several aid programs during her tenure as International Cooperation Minister. She committed two million dollars to land mine removal in Afghanistan and Cambodia, and announced $23.8 million for infrastructure, water and environmental projects in Bangladesh. She pledged $500,000 to promoting dialogue between Israelis and Palestinians in June 1998, and promised $100 million over three to four years for Central American rebuilding efforts following the devastation of Hurricane Mitch. She also committed over fifty million dollars in new money for Kosovar refugees in March 1999.

Marleau gave permission for Canadian organizations to send direct famine relief to North Korea in 1997, during a period of widespread starvation in that country. Direct aid to North Korea is normally prohibited for geopolitical reasons, but Marleau and others argued that humanitarian intervention was necessary in this instance.

In April 1998, Marleau said that Canada would consider restoring foreign aid to Burma after ten years of sanctions for human rights abuses. She argued that Canada was often able to bring about quiet diplomacy with repressive regimes, after earning their trust through development work. Her comments about Burma were widely criticized, and she later indicated that the restoration of foreign aid was conditional on improved human rights conditions.

=== Out of cabinet ===
Marleau was dropped from cabinet on August 3, 1999. She became increasingly critical of Jean Chrétien's leadership after being sent to the backbenches, and developed a reputation as a party maverick. In 2000, she argued that Chrétien was not doing enough to protect medicare and called on the government to block Alberta's plans to allow public funding for private, for-profit clinics. Some Liberal MPs were unhappy with Marleau's remarks; when asked about the matter, Chrétien remarked, "It looks like [bitterness], but I don't know".

Prior to the 2000 federal election, Marleau aligned herself with a group of Liberal MPs who supported Paul Martin's ambition to succeed Chrétien as party leader. Nothing came of this in the short term, and Chrétien led the Liberals to a third consecutive majority government. Marleau ran to become Speaker of the House of Commons in January 2001, but was eliminated on the first ballot. In July 2002, she became one of the first sixteen Liberal MPs to openly call on Chrétien to resign as party leader.

In May 2003, Marleau introduced the first-ever Older Adults Justice Act in Canada. It called for the creation of a national ombudsman on the rights of older Canadians, and sought to amend the Criminal Code to make it a criminal offence to knowingly target the elderly for criminal purposes. The legislation died at committee when parliament was dissolved for the 2004 federal election, and was re-introduced by Lloyd St. Amand in the next Parliament.

Paul Martin succeeded Jean Chrétien as Liberal Party leader and Prime Minister of Canada in December 2003, and led the Liberals to a minority government in the 2004 election. Marleau was re-elected to a fifth term, and was appointed as parliamentary secretary to the President of the Treasury Board and the minister responsible for the Canadian Wheat Board. There was speculation that she would be returned to cabinet in late 2005, but nothing came of this.

The Liberals were defeated in the 2006 federal election, as the Conservatives under Stephen Harper won a minority government. Marleau ran for Speaker again at the start of the new parliament, arguing that she would work to restore decorum during Question Period. She was defeated by incumbent speaker Peter Milliken.

Marleau endorsed Bob Rae in the 2006 Liberal Party leadership contest, and moved to the camp of Stéphane Dion when Rae was eliminated on the next-to-last ballot. She later became a prominent supporter of Dion's Green Shift plan within the Liberal Party. Marleau chaired the House Standing Committee on Government Operations and Estimates in the 39th parliament, and was also elected chair of the Liberal Women's Caucus in March 2008.

Marleau was defeated by New Democratic Party candidate Glenn Thibeault in the 2008 federal election. She later said that comments made by Sudbury Member of Provincial Parliament Rick Bartolucci shortly before election day played a "crucial" role in her defeat. Marleau later said that she would probably not seek re-election to the House of Commons.

The Conservative Party won a second minority government in the 2008 election. In December 2008, the Liberals and New Democrats announced plans to defeat the Conservatives on a motion of non-confidence and form a new coalition government. Marleau was a supporter of the proposed coalition, which dissolved when Stephen Harper prorogued parliament and Michael Ignatieff replaced Dion as Liberal leader.

== After politics ==
Marleau was awarded the Bernadine Yackman Award from the Business and Professional Women's Club of Greater Sudbury in March 2009.

She died on January 30, 2013, following a battle with colorectal cancer. Following her death, statements of tribute were issued by a variety of political figures in the Sudbury area, including former mayor and former Nickel Belt MP John Rodriguez, incumbent mayor Marianne Matichuk, incumbent Sudbury MP Glenn Thibeault and provincial MPPs Rick Bartolucci and France Gélinas, as well as by Paul Martin, Bob Rae, Leona Aglukkaq and Dwight Duncan.

== Electoral record ==
2008 Canadian federal election: Sudbury
Party	Candidate	Votes	%	±%	Expenditures
New Democratic	Glenn Thibeault	15,094	35.15	+3.20	$71,329
Liberal	Diane Marleau	12,969	30.20	−11.37	$50,177
Conservative	Gerry Labelle	11,073	25.79	+4.11	$85,730
Green	Gordon Harris	3,330	7.75	+5.02	$8,704
First Peoples National	Will Morin	397	0.92		$0
Independent	David Popescu	80	0.19	+0.08	$148
Total valid votes/expense limit		42,943	100.00	$82,461	
Total rejected ballots		192	0.45	−0.03	
Turnout		43,135	58.51	−7.48	
Electors on the lists		73,724			
Note: italicized expenditure totals refer to data that has not yet been finalized by Elections Canada.

2006 Canadian federal election: Sudbury
Party	Candidate	Votes	%	±%	Expenditures
Liberal	Diane Marleau	19,809	41.57	−2.62	$78,232
New Democratic	Gerry McIntaggart	15,225	31.95	+2.09	$38,386
Conservative	Kevin Serviss	10,332	21.68	+0.63	$73,294
Green	Joey Methé	1,301	2.73	−1.94	$420
Progressive Canadian	Stephen L. Butcher	782	1.64	–	$365
Marxist–Leninist	Dave Starbuck	77	0.16	−0.07	
Communist	Sam Hammond	70	0.15		$280
Independent	David Popescu	54	0.11	–	$365
Total valid votes		47,650	100.00		
Total rejected ballots		228	0.48	−0.07	
Turnout		47,878	65.99	+5.91	
Electors on the lists		72,552			
Sources: Official Results, Elections Canada and Financial Returns, Elections Canada.

2004 Canadian federal election: Sudbury
Party	Candidate	Votes	%	±%	Expenditures
Liberal	Diane Marleau	18,914	44.19	−12.80	$56,246
New Democratic	Gerry McIntaggart	12,781	29.86	+16.42	$19,265
Conservative	Stephen L. Butcher	9,008	21.05	−6.44	$60,810
Green	Luke Norton	1,999	4.67		$1,348
Marxist–Leninist	Dave Starbuck	100	0.23		$660
Total valid votes		42,802	100.00		
Total rejected ballots		235	0.55	−0.06	
Turnout		43,037	60.08	+5.77	
Electors on the lists		71,627			
Percentage change figures are factored for redistribution. Conservative Party percentages are contrasted with the combined Canadian Alliance and Progressive Conservative percentages from 2000.
Sources: Official Results, Elections Canada and Financial Returns, Elections Canada.

2000 Canadian federal election: Sudbury
Party	Candidate	Votes	%	±%	Expenditures
Liberal	Diane Marleau	20,290	58.52	+3.10	$49,746
Alliance	Mike Smith	6,554	18.90	+5.94	$24,801
New Democratic	Paul Chislett	4,368	12.60	−8.52	$10,732
Progressive Conservative	Alex McGregor	2,642	7.62	−1.01	$3,827
Green	Thomas Gerry	503	1.45		$327
Canadian Action	Kathy Wells-McNeil	215	0.62	−0.63	$2,006
Communist	Daryl Janet Shandro	98	0.28		$591
Total valid votes		34,670	100.00		
Total rejected ballots		210	0.60	−0.41	
Turnout		34,880	54.31	−8.20	
Electors on the lists		64,220			
Sources: Official Results, Elections Canada and Financial Returns, Elections Canada.

1997 Canadian federal election: Sudbury
Party	Candidate	Votes	%	±%	Expenditures
Liberal	Diane Marleau	22,223	55.42	−9.56	$38,251
New Democratic	John Filo	8,471	21.12	−0.93	$43,509
Reform	Jim Rollo	5,198	12.96	+11.66	$10,657
Progressive Conservative	Bill Lee	3,459	8.63	+0.28	$6,493
Canadian Action	Kathy McNeil	502	1.25		$1,258
Natural Law	Roy Hankonen	247	0.62		$0.00
Total valid votes		40,100	100.00		
Total rejected ballots		412	1.02	+0.72	
Turnout		40,512	62.51	−2.82	
Electors on the lists		64,806			
Percentage change figures are factored for redistribution.
Sources: Official Results, Elections Canada and Financial Returns, Elections Canada.

1993 Canadian federal election: Sudbury
Party	Candidate	Votes	%	±%	Expenditures
Liberal	Diane Marleau	27,951	66.08	+24.05	$37,453
Reform	Mike Smith	5,788	13.68		$8,233
Progressive Conservative	Maurice Lamoureux	3,679	8.70	−13.29	$35,719
New Democratic Party	Rosemarie Blenkinsop	3,675	8.69	−19.08	$36,968
National	Paul Chislett	512	1.21		$1,555
Non-affiliated (CoR)	Billie Christiansen	276	0.65	−7.32	$2,852
Natural Law	David Shaw	202	0.48		$141
Independent	Ed Pokonzie	129	0.30		$230
Abolitionist	Richard Lionel Gouin	86	0.20		$0
Total valid votes		42,298	100.00		
Total rejected ballots		379	0.89	+0.34	
Turnout		42,677	65.41	−8.15	
Electors on the lists		65,243			
Source: Thirty-fifth General Election, 1993: Official Voting Results, Published by the Chief Electoral Officer of Canada. Financial figures taken from official contributions and expenses provided by Elections Canada.

1988 Canadian federal election: Sudbury
Party	Candidate	Votes	%	±%	Expenditures
Liberal	Diane Marleau	17,879	42.03	+0.9	$37,582
New Democratic	Bill Major	11,811	27.77	+2.0	$36,732
Progressive Conservative	Bob Fera	9,356	21.99	−10.1	$43,024
Confederation of Regions	S. Brent Ridley	3,391	7.97		$8,808
Communist	Mike Phillips	102	0.24		$2,044
Total valid votes		42,539	100.00		
Total rejected ballots		234	0.55		
Turnout		42,773	73.56		
Electors on the lists		58,144			
Note: The +/- totals are factored for redistribution.

1985 Sudbury municipal election: Mayor of Sudbury
Candidate	Votes	%
(x)Peter Wong	elected	
Diane Marleau	defeated	
Ted Szilva	defeated	
other candidates?		
Total votes cast		

Marleau was elected to the Sudbury City Council in 1980 and 1982. She also served on the Sudbury Regional Council.

All statistical information is taken from Elections Canada. Italicized expenditures from elections after 1997 refer to submitted totals, and are presented when the final reviewed totals are not available.
