= Confederation of Regions Party of Canada candidates in the 1993 Canadian federal election =

The Confederation of Regions Party fielded four candidates in the 1993 federal election, none of whom were elected. Information about these candidates may be found here.

The party was de-registered with Elections Canada on September 27, 1993, for failing to field the required fifty candidates. All of the party's candidates appeared on the ballot as independents.

== Billie Christiansen (Sudbury) ==
Billie Christiansen was a secretary in the late 1980s and early 1990s. She campaigned for the Confederation of Regions Party three times, at the provincial and federal levels. Like other members of the party, she was a vocal opponent of official bilingualism. She attracted the most attention in the 1988 federal election, when she appeared at an all-candidates' meeting brandishing a folder that she said contained proof of francophones discriminating against anglophones in Sudbury. The Sudbury Star newspaper ran her dramatic gesture on its front page. Later in the campaign, Christiansen cited English General James Wolfe's 1759 victory at the Battle of the Plains of Abraham to justify her view that the English language should remain dominant in Canada. She also said that she would not care if Quebec chose to form a separate country.

Christiansen supported the Progressive Conservative Party of Mike Harris in the 1995 provincial election. In a letter to the editor written after the election, she said that Harris's victory was due to voters becoming angry with higher taxes, government interference and funding for "special-interest groups", and concluded by writing, "Score one for the angry white gals". Christiansen later joined the Conservative Party of Canada, and supported Belinda Stronach in the party's 2004 leadership contest.

Electoral record
Election	Division	Party	Votes	%	Place	Winner
1988 federal	Nickel Belt	Confederation of Regions	4,066	10.44	4/5	John Rodriguez, New Democratic Party
1990 provincial	Sudbury	Confederation of Regions	5,795		3/4	Sharon Murdock, New Democratic Party
1993 federal	Sudbury	N/A (Confederation of Regions)	276	0.65	6/9	Diane Marleau, Liberal
