= Margaret Campbell (politician) =

Canadian politician

MPP for St. George
- In office 1973–1981
- Preceded by: Allan Lawrence
- Succeeded by: Susan Fish

Board of Control
- In office 1966–1969 Serving with June Marks, Herbert Orliffe, Allan Lamport
- In office 1964–1966 Serving with William Dennison, Herbert Orliffe, William Archer

City Councillor for Ward 2 (Regent Park and Rosedale)
- In office 1960–1962 Serving with Michael Grayson (Note: Grayson was junior councillor.)
- Succeeded by: Michael Grayson & May Birchard
- In office 1958–1960 Serving with May Birchard (Note: Birchard was senior councillor.)
- Preceded by: William Dennison & May Birchard

Personal details
- Born: Margaret Elizabeth Fasken Baird; December 15, 1912 Toronto, Ontario
- Died: April 19, 1999 (aged 86) Toronto, Ontario
- Party: Liberal
- Spouse: Sterling Campbell
- Children: Sterling Campbell, Jr.
- Profession: Security analyst

Margaret Campbell (December 15, 1912 – April 19, 1999) was a politician in Ontario, Canada. She was a Liberal member of the Legislative Assembly of Ontario, representing the downtown Toronto riding of St. George. Prior to her provincial role, she served as a municipal councillor in Toronto from 1958 to 1962 and later as a member of the Board of Control from 1964 to 1969. She ran for mayor of Toronto in 1969 but came in second to William Dennison.

== Background ==
Born Margaret Elizabeth Fasken Baird, she was raised in Rosedale and attend Bishop Strachan School, University College and then Osgoode Hall Law School and was called to the bar in 1937. She married filmmaker and aviator Sterling Campbell in 1942. During the Second World War she worked in counter-intelligence for the Royal Canadian Mounted Police (RCMP).

Her son Sterling Campbell served a term as a Liberal MPP from Sudbury. Campbell had two daughters, Penelope (Bartok) and Susan (Makela).

== Municipal politics ==
Her husband ran for city council in the 1956 election but was unsuccessful. In the following city elections she ran herself and was victorious in Ward 2. In the 1960 election, she finished first in the ward, entitling her a position on Metro Council in addition to the Toronto seat. In 1966, she became the second woman (Note: The first was Jean Newman in 1956.) to win a seat on the four-member Board of Control and served as the city's budget chief.

In the 1969 election, she ran for mayor, aiming to become the city's first female mayor. Her opponents were the NDP-linked incumbent William Dennison and the official Liberal candidate, Stephen Clarkson. Campbell had been a member of the Progressive Conservative party for many years. Her mayoral campaign focused on an explicitly reformist platform, advocating an end to megaprojects and the adoption of Jane Jacobs-style urbanism as promoted by David Crombie. She finished second to Dennison, losing by some 13,000 votes.

== Provincial politics ==
She briefly left politics to serve as a provincial court judge. When Allan Lawrence retired from the legislature and opened the provincial seat of St. George she resigned her judgeship and ran for the Ontario Liberal Party, leaving the Tory party. St. George had been a staunchly Tory seat for decades, and Campbell faced a prominent opponent in Roy McMurtry, but she was victorious becoming the first woman elected as an Ontario Liberal Party MPP. She was re-elected in 1975 and 1977. She represented the riding until 1981, advocating on issues related to poverty, and in favour of women's and gay rights. She resigned her seat prior to the 1981 election so that she could spend more time with her ailing husband.

In 1984, the Ontario Liberal Party established the Margaret Campbell Fund which supports female candidates who run for the party.
