= 1960 Toronto municipal election =

1960 Toronto mayoral election
- December 5, 1960
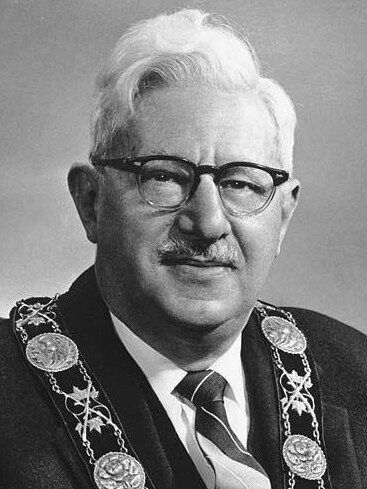

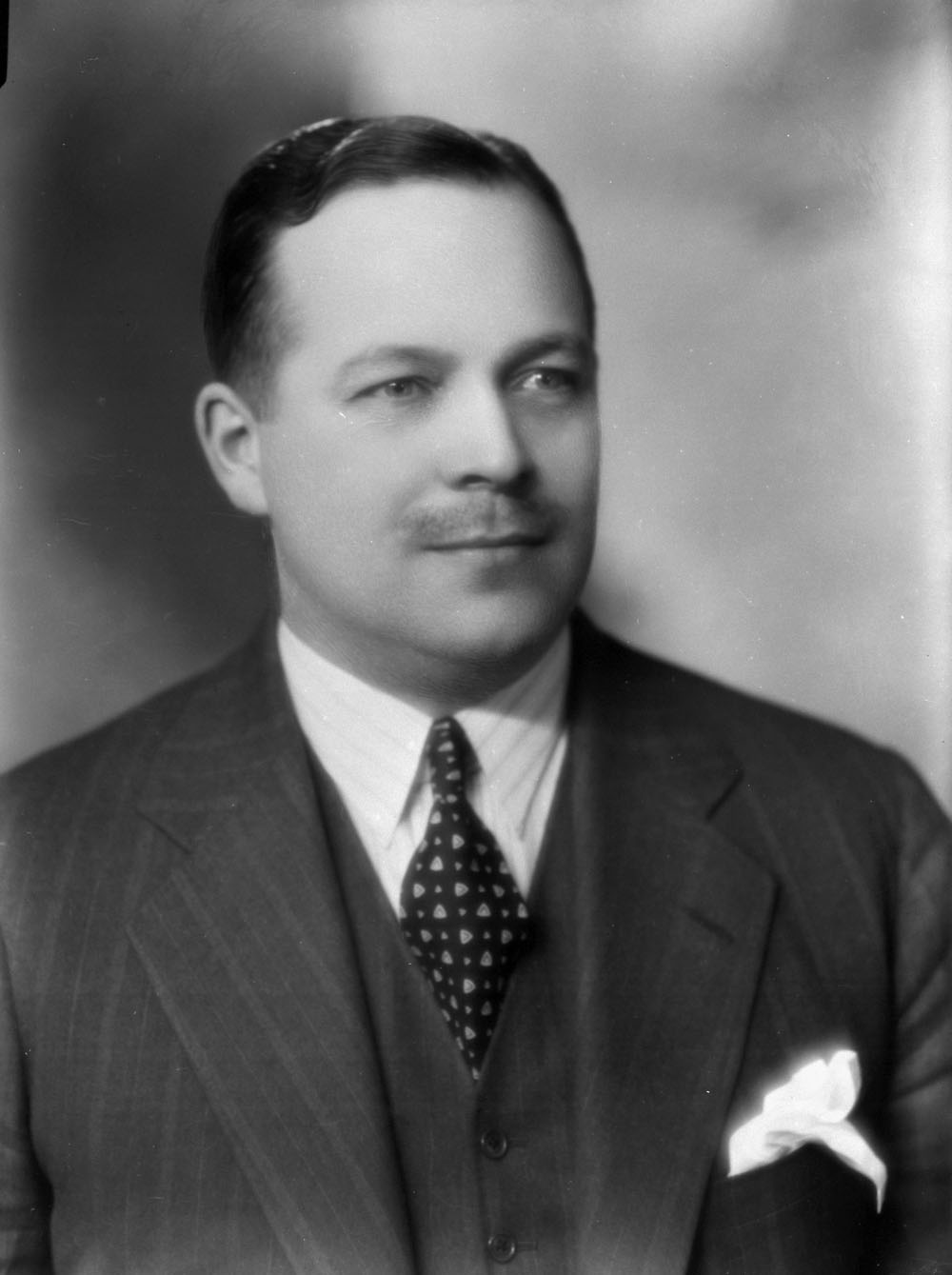

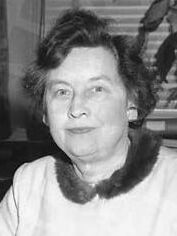
Candidate	Nathan Phillips	Allan Lamport	Jean Newman
Popular vote	81,699	58,254	31,999
Percentage	46.7%	33.3%	18.3%
Mayor of Toronto before election
Nathan Phillips
Elected Mayor of Toronto
Nathan Phillips

Municipal elections were held in Toronto, Ontario, Canada, on December 5, 1960. Six-year incumbent mayor Nathan Phillips was challenged by former mayor Allan Lamport and Controller Jean Newman. Phillips was returned to office.

The City of Toronto also held a referendum on whether to remove the Blue Law banning films and concerts on Sunday evenings. The measure passed 94,000 votes to 58,003.

== Toronto mayor ==
Phillips had first been elected to city council in 1926 and was elected mayor in 1954 and was reelected in 1956 and 1958. He faced two prominent challengers in the 1960 race. Former mayor and Board of Control member Allan Lamport and Controller Jean Newman. Each of the three candidates had the endorsement of one of the city's newspapers. The right-wing Toronto Telegram backed Phillips, the centre-right The Globe and Mail backed Newman, and the centre-left Toronto Daily Star backed Lamport. One of the central issues was over the expansion of the Toronto subway system by building the Bloor-Danforth Line. All candidates supported it, but there was debate over how it should be paid for.

Results
Nathan Phillips - 81,699
Allan Lamport - 58,254
Jean Newman - 31,999
Ross Dowson - 1,643
Harry Bradley - 1,511

== Plebiscite ==
A plebiscite was held on loosening Toronto's blue law to allow cinemas to open on Sundays.

Sunday movies
For - 81,821
Against - 45,399

== Board of Control ==
Top spot on the Board of Control, and the associated budget chief position, was contested between two incumbent conservatives Donald Summerville and William Allen with Summerville winning the top spot. Co-operative Commonwealth Federation (CCF) member William Dennison was also reelected to the Board. The position left open by Newman's decision to run for mayor attracted three aldermen with Philip Givens narrowly beating CCF member Herbert Orliffe and Francis Chambers finishing further behind. A month later in January 1961 William Allen won the position of Metro Toronto Chairman and resigned from the board. Orliffe was appointed to replace him.

The two Controllers with the most votes also sit on Metropolitan Toronto Council.

Results
Donald Summerville (incumbent) - 110,893
William Allen (incumbent) - 110,256
William Dennison (incumbent) - 76,169
Philip Givens - 66,972
Herbert Orliffe - 65,418
Francis Chambers - 30,696
William Harris - 14,493
Jessie Jackson - 14,062
Mary Burke - 13,240

== City council ==
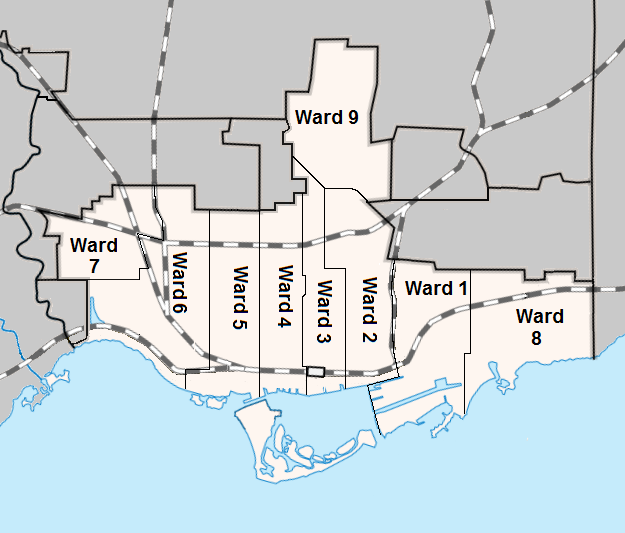
Ward boundaries used in the 1960 election

Two aldermen were elected per Ward. The alderman with the most votes was declared Senior Alderman and sat on both Toronto City Council and Metro Council.

In the elections for Toronto City Council, only one incumbent was defeated, May Birchard in Ward 2. In all but one ward where two incumbents were reelected two councillors switched position changing which would also represent the city on the board of Metro Toronto.

Ward 1 (Riverdale)
Fred Beavis (incumbent) - 10,423
Ken Waters (incumbent) - 10,224
Theobald - 5,566
Peter Ward - 2,092

Ward 2 (Regent Park and Rosedale)
Margaret Campbell (incumbent) - 6,829
Michael Grayson - 5,677
May Birchard (incumbent) - 4,927
Stanley Price - 4,095
Thomas McAulay - 3,360
Currey - 1,194

Ward 3 (West Downtown and Summerhill)
William Archer (incumbent) - 7,509
Charles Tidy (incumbent) - 6,707
John MacVicar - 3,977
James Sanderson - 1,156

Ward 4 (The Annex, Kensington Market and Garment District)
David Rotenberg - 4,766
Horace Brown - 3,626
Murray Caplan - 2,508
Jack Frankel - 2,364
Charles Drukarsh - 2,290
Ralph Meakes - 1,718
Lily Sherizen - 1,654
A.G. Finkelstein - 1,554
Samuel Kwinter - 854
Bruce Magnuson - 847
Dorothy Cureatz - 596

Ward 5 (Trinity-Bellwoods and Little Italy)
Harold Menzies (incumbent) - 6,667
Joseph Piccininni - 4,873
George Ben - 4,317
Louis Lockhart - 3,162
Lloyd White - 3,054
Russell Doyle - 1,609
Janet McMurray - 1,510
John Jones - 1,055

Ward 6 (Davenport and Parkdale)
Frank Clifton (incumbent) - 12,590
May Robinson (incumbent) - 11,201
George Jackson - 3,381
Michael Comar - 3,350
A.J. Robertson - 3,285
Stanley Steban - 3,197
W.G. Martin - 2,855
Pauline Miles - 2,360
Jack Starkman - 1,428
Anne Fritz - 1,142

Ward 7 (Bloor West Village)
William Davidson (incumbent) - 7,226
Mary Temple (incumbent) - 6,368
Thomas Wilson - 5,258
John O'Shea - 3,540

Ward 8 (The Beaches)
Alex Hodgins (incumbent) - 9,995
Tom Wardle Sr. - 9,516
S.T. Bullock - 7,963
Chris Stavro - 7,347
Joseph McNulty - 3,033
S.A. Baker - 2,486
A.A. Williams - 1,382
E.V. Cox - 1,064
Taiml Davis - 922
John Square - 455

Ward 9 (North Toronto)
Kenneth Ostrander (incumbent) - 20,481
Frank Nash (incumbent) - 11,907
Helen Johnston - 9,916
William Hall - 7,166

Results are taken from the December 6, 1960 Toronto Star and might not exactly match final tallies.

== Changes ==
Controller William Allen resigned upon being elected Metro Chairman on January 9, 1962. On January 15, 1962 Controller William Dennison was appointed Metro Councillor and Herbert Orliffe was appointed Controller

== Suburbs ==
=== East York ===
Reeve
True Davidson - 5,047
(incumbent)Jack Raymond Allen - 3,431
Charles Howard Chandler - 3,275
Royden Meyer Brigham - 2,687
Norman Cheeseman - 1,690
Albert Morgan - 222

=== Etobicoke ===
Reeve
(incumbent)Henry Oscar Waffle - 14,726
Murray Johnson - 11,448
C. Robert Bush - 8,549

Deputy Reeve
John P. MacBeth - 14,899
John Allen - 9,829
Clifford Tinkham - 9,363

Source: "Waffle Easily Wins Etobicoke", Toronto Daily Star (1900-1971); Toronto, Ontario [Toronto, Ontario]06 Dec 1960: 9

=== Forest Hill ===
Reeve
(incumbent)Laurie T. Simonsky - 2,674
Perly - 1,814
Labow - 743

Deputy Reeve
Banks - 1,873
Pivnick - 2,905

Source: and "Simonsky Again Forest Hill Reeve", Toronto Daily Star (1900-1971); Toronto, Ontario [Toronto, Ontario]06 Dec 1960: 9

=== Leaside ===
Mayor
(incumbent)Charles Hiscott (acclaimed)

=== Long Branch ===
Reeve
(incumbent)Marie Curtis (acclaimed)

=== Mimico ===
Mayor
Hugh Griggs
(incumbent)William Arthur (Gus) Edwards

=== New Toronto ===
Mayor
(incumbent)Donald Russell - 1,501
White - 1,255

=== North York ===
Reeve
(incumbent)Norman C. Goodhead 37,365
Harold Segal 14,993

=== Scarborough ===
Reeve
(incumbent)Albert Campbell (acclaimed)

=== Swansea ===
Reeve
(incumbent)Dorothy Hague (acclaimed)

Deputy Reeve
Harry Squarebriggs (acclaimed)

=== Weston ===
Mayor
George W. Bull - 1,683
Clark - 1,026

=== York ===
Reeve
Frederick Charles Taylor- 14,766
(incumbent)Chris Tonks - 6,369
Charles McMaster - 2,735
Pauline Shapero - 1,912

Taylor defeated Tonks who had been ensnared in a conflict-of-interest scandal. Source:
