= Sterling Campbell (politician) =

Canadian politician (born 1942)

Ontario MPP
- In office 1987–1990
- Preceded by: Jim Gordon
- Succeeded by: Sharon Murdock
- Constituency: Sudbury

Personal details
- Born: March 16, 1942 (age 84) Toronto, Ontario, Canada
- Party: Liberal
- Education: University of California, Berkeley, Wayne State University and Central Michigan University
- Occupation: Teacher

Sterling Campbell (born March 16, 1942) is a former Canadian politician, who served in the Legislative Assembly of Ontario as a Liberal from 1987 to 1990.

== Background ==
Campbell, the son of film director Sterling Campbell and politician Margaret Campbell, was born and raised in Toronto. He studied at the University of California, Berkeley, Wayne State University and Central Michigan University before moving to Sudbury in 1972 to work as a teacher.

== Politics ==
Campbell was an alderman in Sudbury and a member of the Regional Municipality of Sudbury council from 1976 to 1987. He was vice-chair of the Sudbury Regional Health and Social Services Committee from 1976 to 1980, and chair of the Regional Welfare Board from 1982 to 1987. He was a candidate for mayor of the city in 1981, when council had to select a replacement for Jim Gordon, but withdrew in favour of Maurice Lamoureux.

He was elected to the Ontario legislature in the 1987 election, defeating Gordon (now the incumbent Progressive Conservative MPP) by 2,630 votes in the riding of Sudbury. He served as a backbench supporter of David Peterson's government for the next three years. From 1987 to 1988, he served as parliamentary assistant to the Minister of Mines. He also chaired a special select committee on education reforms from October 1989 until the dissolution of the legislature for the 1990 provincial election.

The Liberals were defeated by the Ontario New Democratic Party in the 1990 election, and Campbell lost his seat to NDP candidate Sharon Murdock by 3,397 votes.

== After politics ==
He returned to his teaching position in Sudbury after 1990. In 1997, Campbell joined the Ontario College Council representing the Northern Ontario secondary school sector. He had previously finished second in council elections, and joined the council after the resignation of Michel Gravelle. He retired in 1999, and moved to Campbell River, British Columbia on Vancouver Island in 2002.

Campbell was awarded the 2002 Norm Snyder Award by the Ontario Secondary School Teachers' Federation.
