= 1997 Sudbury municipal election =

The 1997 Sudbury municipal election was held on November 10, 1997, as voters in Sudbury, Ontario and its outlying communities voted to elected mayors, councillors and school trustees. This was the last municipal election in the region prior to its amalgamation as the new city of Greater Sudbury.

Notably, the 1997 municipal election was the first time that the chair of the Regional Municipality of Sudbury was generally elected by all voters in the regional municipality rather than being selected by an internal vote of the regional council. That election was won by Peter Wong, a former mayor of Sudbury, although Wong died in 1998 after less than a year in office. Following Wong's death, Councillor Doug Craig served as interim chair until a special by-election was won later that year by Frank Mazzuca, a former mayor of Capreol who had finished second to Wong in the 1997 election.

== Results ==
=== Sudbury ===
1997 Sudbury election, Mayor of Sudbury
Candidate	Total votes	% of total votes
Jim Gordon	elected	not listed

=== Nickel Centre ===
1997 Sudbury election, Mayor of Nickel Centre
Candidate	Total votes	% of total votes
John Fera	elected	not listed
