= Thomas McAulay =

Thomas McAulay may refer to:

- Thomas McAulay, candidate in Toronto municipal election, 1960#City council
- Thomas McAulay, victim of Stockline Plastics factory explosion

== See also ==
- Thomas Macaulay (disambiguation)
