= Ted Szilva =

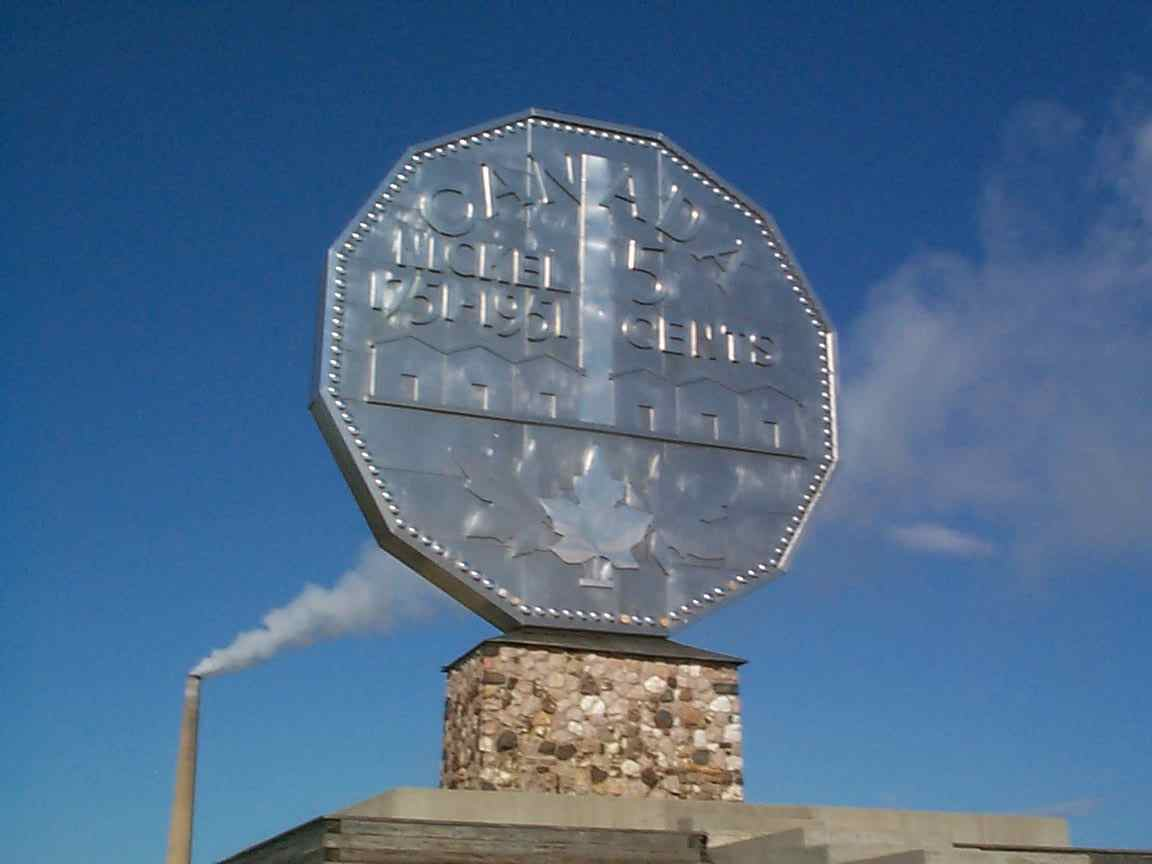
The Big Nickel.

Theodore Arthur "Ted" Szilva, OOnt (December 11, 1934 – March 9, 2016) was a Canadian businessman in Greater Sudbury, Ontario. He was best known for creating the city's "Big Nickel" landmark.

Szilva was born and raised in the old city of Sudbury. He proposed the Big Nickel monument in 1963, when he was a 28-year-old firefighter. It subsequently became one of Sudbury's most recognizable features, and Szilva owned both the monument and the surrounding park area until 1981.

Szilva was an active Roman Catholic. During the 1980s, he co-managed a successful private lottery named "Pot `O' Gold" that provided funding for Ontario's Catholic schools. When the provincial government of Bill Davis extended full funding to Catholic education in 1984, Szilva helped wind down the lottery and re-establish it as a charity fund. Some have suggested that Davis's decision to fund Catholic schools was predicated, in part, on his government's desire to re-establish control over the lottery sector. Szilva continued to co-manage the charity fund into the 2000s.

Szilva was a longtime member of the Liberal Party of Canada and the Ontario Liberal Party, and played an organizational role in several political campaigns. He ran for Mayor of Sudbury against Peter Wong in 1985, but was defeated. He endorsed Colin Firth's bid to become mayor in 2003, and unsuccessfully sought a seat on the Roman Catholic School Board in 2006.

He was the inventor of the D-Best Keyholder, and was president of D-Best Products.

In 2009, he was made a member of the Order of Ontario.

Szilva and his son Jim published The Big Nickel: The Untold Story, a book about the challenges he faced bringing the project to fruition, in 2014.
