= Thomas Macaulay (disambiguation) =

Thomas Babington Macaulay (1800–1859) was a British historian and politician.

Thomas or Tom Macaulay may also refer to:

- Thomas Bassett Macaulay (1860–1942), Canadian actuary and philanthropist
- Tom Macaulay (1906–1979), British actor
- Thomas Babington Macaulay (Nigeria) (1826–1878), educationist, reverend, and father of Nigerian nationalist Herbert Macaulay

== See also ==
- Thomas McAulay (disambiguation)
- Tom McCauley (died 1865), California Gold Rush criminal
- Tom McCauley (American football) (born 1947), American football defensive back
