= Sterling Campbell (director) =

Canadian aviator and film director

- Born: Sterling Carl Campbell; 1896/97?
- Died: September 6, 1990; Toronto, Ontario, Canada
- Occupation: film director
- Known for: Bush Pilot
- Spouse: Margaret Campbell
- Children: Sterling Campbell, Jr.

Sterling Carl Campbell (1896/97 - September 6, 1990) was a Canadian aviator and film director best known for the 1947 film Bush Pilot, one of the first narrative feature films ever produced by a Canadian film production company.

Campbell served in the Canadian Army during the First World War. He later worked in Hollywood, California, as a technical and action assistant director, including the films Wings, Dawn Patrol, Hell's Angels, Air Circus, Legion of the Condemned, Forced Landing and Ceiling Zero, and as an assistant to Cecil B. DeMille and Howard Hawks. He also had minor acting roles in the films Forced Landing, Hands Across the Table, Professional Soldier and Love Is News.

He subsequently returned to Canada, where he served in the Royal Canadian Air Force during World War II. He married Margaret Campbell, later a Toronto City Councillor and Member of Provincial Parliament, in 1941.

With Geoffrey Wood, Larry Cromien and Austin Willis, Campbell launched Dominion Productions in 1946. Bush Pilot was the company's first film. Due to poorer than expected revenues, however, the company never released another film under their management, and was subsequently acquired by Arthur Gotlieb.

Campbell ran for a Toronto City Council seat in the 1956 municipal election, but fell while campaigning, exacerbating an old war injury and remaining bedridden for several months; despite having effectively dropped his campaign, he finished third behind the winners, William Dennison and May Birchard, and ahead of incumbent councillor Edgar Roxborough. In the subsequent 1958 municipal election, Margaret Campbell ran for council instead, winning the seat and beginning her own long career in politics.

His son Sterling Campbell, Jr. was a city councillor and Member of Provincial Parliament in Sudbury in the 1970s and 1980s.

He died on September 6, 1990, in Toronto.
