= Bush Pilot (film) =

1947 film by Sterling Campbell

- Directed by: Sterling Campbell; Larry Cromien (aerial sequences)
- Written by: Gordon Burwash (additional dialogue); Scott Darling (story)
- Produced by: Larry Cromien (producer); Jack Ogilvie (associate producer)
- Starring: See below
- Cinematography: Edward Hyland
- Edited by: Jack Ogilvie
- Music by: Samuel Hersenhoren
- Production company: Dominion Pictures
- Distributed by: Screen Guild Productions
- Release date: June 7, 1947
- Running time: 60 minutes
- Countries: Canada; United States
- Language: English
- Budget: $150,000

Bush Pilot is a 1947 drama film directed by Sterling Campbell. The film, produced by Campbell's Dominion Productions, was noted for being one of the first full-length feature films outside Quebec in which a Canadian production company held the primary role.

== Plot summary ==
Red North is a bush pilot in the village of Nouvelle, part of Canada's north. His half-brother, Paul Gerard decides to relocate his bush pilot business to the same lake, competing with Red's business and romantic interests.

== Cast ==
- Rochelle Hudson as Hilary Ward
- Jack La Rue as Paul Girard
- Austin Willis as "Red" North
- Florence Kennedy as Mrs. Ward
- Frank Perry as Chuck Ward
- Joseph Carr as Andy Moodie
- Gordon Adam
- Louise Campbell
- Charles Emerson
- Gerald Rowan
- James Peddie
- Denis Murphy
- Michael Lambert
- Robert Christie
- Eric Clavering
- Nancy Graham
- Alene Kamis

== Production ==
The film was one of the first narrative feature films produced in English by a Canadian film production company, and touted as "the first all-Canadian movie". The company was Dominion Productions Limited. Director Sterling Campbell was a partner in the company along with the film's producer Larry Cromien and the stars, Austin Willis and Geoffrey Wood. The main backer was Wood, founder of G. H. Wood & Co., a sanitation supply company that bore the motto "Sanitation for the Nation." He invested $160,000 in the film.

Bush Pilot was meant to be the first of six films.

The movie was one of the first features to be shot in Toronto with studio work done at Queensway Studios. Outdoor and flight sequences filmed in the Muskoka region of Ontario, particularly Lake Rosseau.

The production used many actual planes on-screen including a Stinson Reliant (SR-9EM), a Noorduyn Norseman V, and a Waco Custom Cabin series aircraft the Waco ZQC-6.

== Reception ==
Although J. Arthur Rank owned Queensway Studios, he did not pick up the film for distribution in his cinema chains. The movie was not a box office success and Dominion Productions never made another film. "I got pretty enthusiastic about all that film nonsense", Wood recalled in 1987. "But I didn't know what was going on. I knew as much about the movies as those movie people knew about sanitation."

== Restoration ==
Wood deposited a nitrate negative of the film with the National Archives in 1972. Although long out of print, the film was restored by the National Archives of Canada and The Movie Network in the 1990s, and was screened on the Movie Network as a special Canada Day broadcast in 1998.

According to the Globe and Mail, "despite the hoary stereotypes and predictable plot, Bush Pilot was, to its credit, far ahead of its time in its unashamed use of specifically Canadian references." The Toronto Star called it "a camp curio today, an unintended hoot.",
