= Jim Gordon (politician) =

Canadian politician (born 1937)

The Honourable Jim Gordon CM ECO
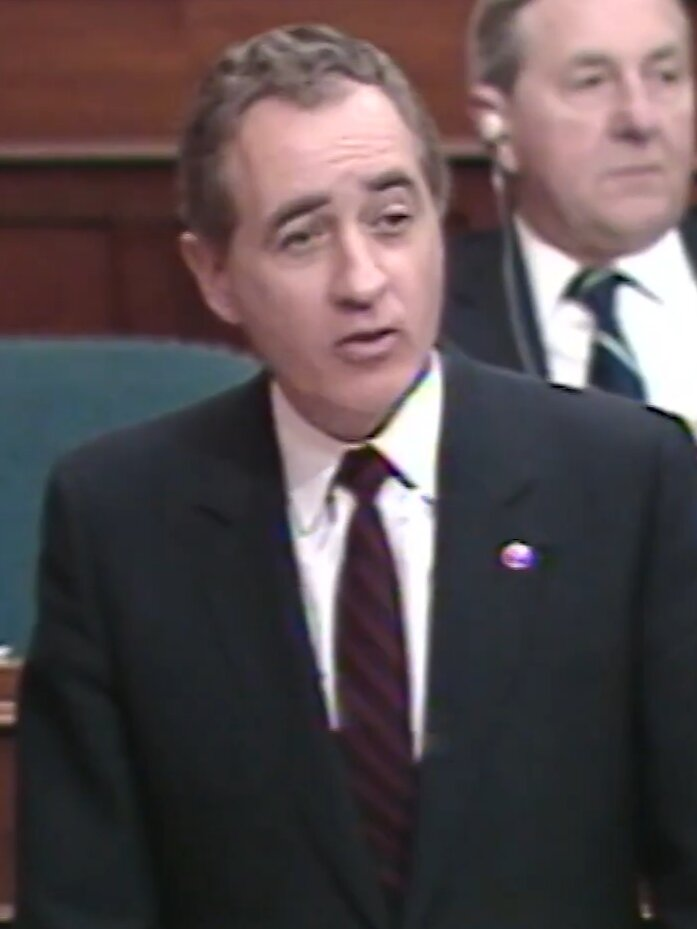
- Gordon in 1986

Mayor of Sudbury, Ontario
- In office 1976–1981
- Preceded by: Joe Fabbro
- Succeeded by: Maurice Lamoureux

MPP for Sudbury
- In office March 19, 1981 – September 9, 1987
- Preceded by: Bud Germa
- Succeeded by: Sterling Campbell

Mayor of Sudbury, Ontario
- In office 1991 – December 31, 2000
- Preceded by: Peter Wong
- Succeeded by: last mayor pre-amalgamation

Mayor of Greater Sudbury
- In office January 1, 2001 – 2003
- Preceded by: first mayor
- Succeeded by: David Courtemanche

Personal details
- Born: March 6, 1937 (age 89) Rouyn-Noranda, Quebec
- Party: Progressive Conservative
- Education: St. Charles College (Sudbury); Assumption University
- Occupation: teacher

James K. Gordon CM (born March 6, 1937) is a Canadian politician who served as mayor of Sudbury, Ontario from 1976 to 1981 and from 1991 to 2003, and as a Member of Provincial Parliament for the provincial electoral district of Sudbury from 1981 to 1987. He briefly served in the Executive Council of Ontario, holding the position of Minister of Government Services in 1985.

He is Sudbury's longest-serving mayor, having served a total of 17 years. In 2000, the Canadian edition of Reader's Digest named him one of the three most influential and innovative mayors in Canada.

== Early life and education ==
Gordon was born in Rouyn-Noranda in 1937 and grew up in Sudbury. He was part of the first graduating class of St. Charles College. During high school, he was president of the student council and hosted his own radio program, Time for Teens, Saturdays between 1951 and 1955 on CKSO radio in Sudbury. He competed in distance running, one and two mile, in track and field.

He earned a Bachelor of Arts in psychology at Assumption University in 1960. In his final year of university, he married Donna Drew. In 1961, they returned to Greater Sudbury, Ontario. In addition to CKSO Radio and Television, Gordon worked in sales for UPJOHN Pharmaceuticals and then became a secondary school teacher.

Jim and Donna Gordon raised six daughters and now have ten grandchildren.

== Teaching career ==
Gordon taught English in the secondary school system in Greater Sudbury for four decades. He also held a specialist in Library Science and was responsible for the Resource Centre at Nickel District Secondary School for some of his tenure at the school. Gordon taught at the following secondary schools, returning to education at various junctures of his political career:

- St. Charles College – 1961 to 1965
- Espanola High School – 1965 to 1966
- Confederation High School – 1965 to 1968
- St. Charles College – 1968 to 1969
- Nickel District Secondary School – 1969 to 1976
- Sudbury Secondary School – 1988 to 1991

== Political career ==
Gordon served on the town council of Espanola in 1965 before moving back to Sudbury. He ran as a Progressive Conservative candidate in the Sudbury constituency in the 1967 election, but was not elected.

He was elected to Sudbury City Council in 1971, and became mayor in 1976. He served until 1981 and ran for a second time as the Progressive Conservative candidate in Sudbury in the 1981 provincial election. He won that election and served as a backbench supporter of Bill Davis's government. Gordon supported Larry Grossman at the Progressive Conservative Party's leadership convention of February 1985.

Gordon was a cabinet minister in the short-lived government of Frank Miller, serving as Minister of Government Services from May 17 to June 26, 1985, until Miller's government was defeated by the Ontario Liberal Party sweep of David Peterson in the 1987 election. Gordon was defeated by Sterling Campbell in Sudbury.

In 1991, Gordon ran again as mayor of Sudbury, and defeated incumbent mayor Peter Wong. He served as the city's mayor until 2000, when the city, the towns and the Regional Municipality of Sudbury were transitioned into the new city of Greater Sudbury through a transition board established by the Government of Ontario. He ran for mayor of the new amalgamated city in the 2000 municipal election, and won that election as well. Gordon's tenure as mayor of Sudbury was marked by efforts to diversify the city's mining-based economy. As the city's provincial representative in the early 1980s, he was also a key supporter of the Science North project, which has since become the city's and Northern Ontario's most successful tourist attraction.

Gordon announced his retirement from politics in 2003.

== Mayor of City of Sudbury, 1976–1981 ==
=== Fiscal Policy ===
Gordon introduced zero-based budgeting to municipal budgets. The city was fiscally constrained in the 1970s. He would later use this policy as mayor in the 1990s to maintain zero increases in taxes.

=== Development and housing ===
Gordon worked with city council to encourage the private sector and the provincial government including John Rhodes (Minister of Housing at the time) to expand the supply of housing in Sudbury which resulted in many new homes, apartment developments and housing for the socially disadvantaged.

=== Re-greening of Sudbury ===
Gordon supported and worked with municipal leaders such as Tom Davies, chair of the Regional Municipality of Sudbury, and other regional politicians in the creation of policies that established a successful re-greening effort that was eventually recognized by the United Nations for successful environmental land reclamation.

== Member of provincial parliament for Sudbury, 1981–1987 ==
=== Northeast Cancer Centre (formerly Northeastern Regional Cancer Treatment Centre) ===
In 1983, as parliamentary assistant to Minister of Health Larry Grossman, Gordon was able to secure a decision by the government to establish a cancer treatment centre in Sudbury, which now serves Northeastern Ontario. The development of a cancer centre allowed patients and families to remain closer to their homes in the north during treatment as well as making Sudbury a major medical centre within the northeast. The sophistication of the cancer treatment centre as both a treatment centre and an important research facility was one of the cornerstones Gordon was able to leverage in his pursuit of a medical school for Northern Ontario.

=== Agency status for Science North ===
Gordon was instrumental in getting the province of Ontario to agree to make Science North an agency of the province, thereby providing a solid base of operating funding for what is now Canada's second-largest science centre.

=== Development of mining machinery manufacturing ===
Sudbury has always been a centre of resource extraction. INCO and Falconbridge Nickel Mines were the largest producers, but Gordon argued that, in addition to mining, the development of a mining machinery manufacturing industry would contribute greatly to the stability of the economy in Sudbury. To that end, he met with the provincial Minister of Industry, Gordon Walker. Walker agreed that the government would set up a Centre for Resource Machinery Technology, and he appointed as its members Jim Gordon (MPP for Sudbury), Mike Harris (MPP for Nipissing), Darryl Lake (Cambrian College), and Walter Curlook (vice-president of INCO for Ontario Operations, later President).

INCO became very interested in participating in this project because it would benefit both the company and the community, and through negotiations, eventually received a grant from the Ontario government. The mining machinery manufacturing company that was set up by INCO, now known as Continuous Mining, has since been purchased by Bob Lipic.

== Mayor of Sudbury and Greater Sudbury, 1991–2003 ==
During the 1990s Sudbury experienced a substantial loss of population along with stagnant municipal assessment. Recognizing the importance of diversification and development to the city's survival, Gordon spearheaded specific major initiatives. Gordon worked with others at all levels of government and fostered a strong relationship with city council to achieve fiscal strength for the city and projects that would benefit the community and the Northeast.

=== Northern Ontario Mayors' Coalition ===
In 1992, Gordon tried to unite municipalities in Northern Ontario, with the cooperation of Thunder Bay mayor David Hamilton. Initially, he held a meeting in Thunder Bay in an effort to form an organization to lobby government. The outcome was that he and Hamilton spearheaded the organization of a coalition of mayors of the five largest cities in Northern Ontario (Sudbury, Thunder Bay, Timmins, Sault Ste. Marie and North Bay).

This coalition gave the largest northern municipalities a unified voice in their dealings with the provincial and federal governments. This group, representing approximately 70 per cent of Northern Ontario's population, worked for projects benefitting the whole of Northern Ontario.

Over time, this strategy proved effective in pursuing the establishment of the Northern Ontario School of Medicine, which would train doctors to serve rural, northern and aboriginal communities, as well as other initiatives such as broadband infrastructure in Northern Ontario.

=== Northern Ontario School of Medicine ===
Gordon was a driving force in obtaining a medical school in response to the ongoing challenges of healthcare delivery in the north, in particular the shortage of doctors and the difficulties in providing effective healthcare for rural and aboriginal communities.

In 1999, the Ontario Ministry of Health and Long-term Care appointed Dr. Robert McKendry to report on physician supply and demand in the province. The report gave weight to the view that "the established medical schools had paid insufficient attention to preparing students for rural and northern practice". McKendry came to the conclusion that meeting underserviced areas' needs might best be met by building a new medical school.

In addition to the efforts being made by the university community and medical professionals in the north, Gordon realized that political initiative was required to put pressure on the government of Premier Mike Harris. To that end he arranged, on behalf of the Northern Ontario Mayors Coalition, a coalition of the mayors of the five major cities in the north, to meet with Health Minister Elizabeth Witmer to plead their case. Witmer agreed to have the government's expert panel receive a proposal from the north, a proposal that laid out a model for an entirely new school.

However, the expert panel had other ideas, and on February 16, 2001, the Toronto Star published a leaked report that the intention was that Sudbury, Thunder Bay and Windsor would become clinical education campuses, extensions of programmes at existing medical schools. Gordon had been quoted as saying, "It's time for us, the councils in the north, to move politically on this," and when the April 2001 Speech from the Throne brought no announcement, Gordon arranged that the Northern Ontario Mayors' Coalition would meet with the Minister of Northern Development and Mines, Dan Newman.

Newman agreed to fund an international symposium in Sudbury. Experts from around the world, including Australia, New Mexico, and Finland attended, and on May 17, 2001, Tony Clement, the new Minister of Health, announced in Sudbury a new stand-alone medical school that would specialize in preparing students for northern, rural and remote practice. It would be the first medical school to be opened in Canada in over thirty years.

In October 2001, Harris came to Sudbury to name the implementation management committee with Gordon as chair. Its purpose was to develop a business and implementation plan for the school and to communicate with northern communities to establish a vision statement.

Gordon viewed the establishment of the medical school as his and the North's major political achievement. It was the first time the entire North was united and achieved a project of this magnitude.

=== Broadband infrastructure ===
Gordon was the architect of the city's telecommunications strategy, which included the building of broadband infrastructure to link health services, academic institutions, and municipal services, and nascent film industry, as well as attracting telecom industries such as call centres. Approximately 3,000 jobs were created in the technology sector between 1995 and 2000.

In 1998, he secured $1 million in funding from the provincial government to launch sureNet (Sudbury Regional Network), Sudbury's fibre-optic communications network. Gordon was the founding chair of the sureNet consortium, which included partners such as health, education, municipal, and private groups.

=== NetCentral ===
In 1999, Gordon became the founding chairman of NetCentral, a not-for-profit corporation supported by the mayors of Sudbury, Chapleau, Parry Sound, Elliot Lake and Northeastern Manitoulin and the Islands. The purpose of NetCentral was to develop a high-speed, high-capacity telecommunications network infrastructure to foster economic development, create jobs, and create better access to educational and health services in and among Northern Ontario communities.

NetCentral was incorporated in 1999 to develop a high-speed telecommunications network infrastructure for the following purposes: to connect communities, public agencies and organizations; to enhance access to educational and health services in northern communities; and to promote technology-oriented economic development and job creation in Northern Ontario.

As a result of Sudbury's high-speed telecommunications network, Sudbury attracted companies such as Teletech and Canadian Blood Services, creating thousands of jobs for the region.

=== Music and film industry support ===
Gordon worked closely with the proponents of two major developments in the arts community over the past two decades: Music and Film in Motion, and Cinéfest.

Gordon provided encouragement and support through Greater Sudbury Development Corporation for the city's first nationwide CBC television program, Chilly Beach. March Entertainment, the show's creators, relied on the broadband network to do the back-office work for the program in Sudbury and the front-office work in Toronto.

=== Northeastern Ontario Smart Growth Panel ===
Gordon was a member of the Northeastern Ontario Smart Growth Panel appointed by the Minister of Municipal Affairs and Housing. This panel was composed of leaders from industry, educational institutions, First Nations, community organizations and the municipal sector "to develop recommendations for bringing increased prosperity and growth to northeastern Ontario". The provision of a tax incentive zone was one of many recommendations made by this panel.

=== Fiscal Policy ===
As mayor, Gordon worked with city council to establish a climate in which collaboration and co-operation were encouraged to find a way to hold the line on property taxes. The mayor worked in partnership with the city's management and the unionized employees to use the zero-based budgeting process and to find millions of dollars in reductions in the city's budget without layoffs. As a result, the city was able to hold the line on taxes. In 1994, Sudbury topped the list of local municipal efforts to control property taxes in Ontario, according to the Canadian Federation of Independent Business (Members’ Opinions Survey #34, July 1994), a survey based on 8,058 face-to-face interviews with members from 18 communities.

=== Local community initiatives ===
Gordon strongly supported multicultural initiatives and associations in Sudbury throughout his career, including the Sudbury Multicultural and Folk Arts Association, an umbrella organization of 50 delegate groups with a client population of over 30,000 citizens of Sudbury. He attended numerous functions and provided guidance and assistance.

On the occasion of the official visit of Lieutenant Governor Hilary Weston on July 1, 2001, he received recognition from the multicultural community at the Canada Day celebrations. He has been made an honorary lifetime member of the Societa Caruso and was awarded the Gold Combatants Cross in recognition of his assistance to the Polish Combatants Association, an organization originally established by 5,000 Polish veterans who had fought with the Allies in World War II and who were allowed by the Canadian government to immigrate to Canada.

He lobbied, along with the original proponents Hélène Fontaine (now deceased) and Jacques Michaud, for the establishment of a French college in Sudbury, which is now Collège Boréal.

== Post-retirement community leadership, 2003–present ==
Since his retirement from politics, Gordon continues to serve as chair of NetCentral, a not-for-profit community-based network operating in Northern Ontario. He also served as chair of Parkside Older Adult Centre from 2010 to 2011, and as a member of the board from 2007 to 2011. In 2005, he served as honorary co-chair of the Sudbury Samaritan Centre, a facility designed to help residents in need including the homeless, with services that include a soup kitchen, drop-in mission, health centre and a support program to help people re-establish themselves in the community. He was a member of the board of Northern Artists Gallery/Artists on Elgin, a gallery which exhibits and sells work from northern artists and helps to market the local art industry to the surrounding community. He served as a member of the executive committee of the Northern Ontario School of Medicine from 2003 to 2011.

=== Expert panel on health cluster development ===
Gordon has chaired various committees in his tenure with the corporation. He chaired the health cluster development expert panel and led the committee through the exploration of several initiatives including the health impact of poverty, and a centre of excellence in occupational health and safety.

=== Alternative Level of Care (ALC) crisis ===
Gordon was appointed as chair and led the investigation of the ALC bed crisis at Sudbury Regional Hospital. He consulted with many groups including the Sudbury Physician's Task Force, the North East Community Care Access Centre, the Sudbury Regional Hospital and the North East LHIN.

From these consultations, Gordon recommended 47 short-term and long-term measures to address the bed crisis. Based on his report, city council called on the Ontario government to adopt several measures to address the ALC crisis. City council also ratified Gordon's recommendation to house ALC patients at another site.

=== Regional Data Storage Project ===
Gordon currently chairs the Regional Data Storage Project and has been in this role since April 2011. The primary objective of this project is to develop a regional data centre that will position Greater Sudbury to benefit from the economic potential of the growing need for secure data storage services.

== Awards and memberships ==
- Member of the Order of Canada - 2014
- Assumption University of Windsor – Named as one of the alumni of the century - 2012
- Community Builders Award of Excellence - Economic Development - 2004

The award goes to an individual or group that has had an important impact on the economic well-being of the community. They have chaired and led a committee, they have helped bring new business to town, or they are responsible for putting in place infrastructure.

- First recipient of the Order of Sudbury Award – 2003
- Jim Gordon Walkway - 2003

Bell Park walkway on Ramsey Lake was renamed in honour of Gordon. (The Bell Park Walkway was an initiative Gordon championed strongly during his time as mayor.)

- Executive Award and Lifetime Member Award, Federation of Northern Ontario Municipalities (FONOM) - 2003

The Executive Award is presented annually by FONOM to an elected leader who has "contributed in a special meaningful way towards the enrichment and betterment of the residents of Northern Ontario".

- Honorary Lifetime Membership, Older Adult Centre Sudbury - October 17, 2003

Presented in recognition of Jim Gordon’s "dedicated leadership in support of seniors in the Sudbury community".

- Queen's Golden Jubilee Medal – 2002

Presented in recognition of outstanding and exemplary contributions to their communities.

- The Sudbury Multicultural and Folk Arts Association Award - July 1, 2001

On the occasion of Year 2001 International Year of Volunteerism "in recognition of his community vision, spirit, leadership and dedication to the citizens of our city"

- Community Service Award, Ontario Medical Association - May 2000

Presented to Jim Gordon in recognition "of his outstanding contributions to the health and welfare of the people of Sudbury".

- Dr. Fred Sheridan Award, Cambrian College - 1999

The Dr. Fred Sheridan Award recognizes contributions to the advancement and betterment of society through extraordinary service to education.

- Paul Harris Award - Rotary Club of Sudbury Sunrisers - 1998

The Paul Harris Fellowship Award is one of the highest honours Rotary bestows. Recipients are Rotarians and community professionals in recognition of their outstanding contributions, exemplifying the highest ideal in Rotary in placing service above self.

- Municipal Electric Association Award - October 1994

Presented to Jim Gordon" in recognition of the contribution made to the municipal hydro systems in the province by the valuable service shown as a Hydro Commissioner for the Municipality of Sudbury for a period of nine years and for loyalty to the ideals of province-wide publicly owned hydro electric system".

- Gold Combatants' Cross, The Polish Combatants' Association in Canada - August 15, 1994
- Commemorative Medal for the 125th Anniversary of Canadian Confederation - November 27, 1992

Issued in 1992 to commemorate the 125th anniversary of the Confederation of Canada, the Medal honours Canadians who have made a significant contribution to their fellow citizens, to their community or to Canada.

- Honorary Life Member, Caruso Club (Società Caruso), Sudbury
- Honorary Life Member, Knights of Columbus, Sudbury
- Honorary Lifetime Subscriber Award, Cinefest
- Jim & Donna Gordon Bursary, Northern Ontario School of Medicine

Contributed an endowment to provide financial assistance annually to a student enrolled at the Northern Ontario School of Medicine

- Member, Ontario Association of Former Parliamentarians
