= 1985 Ontario municipal elections =

The 1985 Ontario municipal elections were held on November 12, 1985, to elect mayors, municipal councils, school boards, and hydro commissions in cities, towns and other incorporated communities throughout the Canadian province of Ontario.

It was the first time that judges, psychiatric patients and prisoners awaiting trial could vote. In one notable result, psychiatric patients in a maximum security institution in Tay Township voted in favour of a plebiscite to bring back capital punishment.

The most closely watched contests occurred in Metropolitan Toronto. Art Eggleton was re-elected as Mayor of Toronto, while Mel Lastman was returned as Mayor of North York.

Peter Wong was re-elected two a second term as mayor of Sudbury and Dave Neumann was re-elected to a third term as mayor of Brantford.

== Elected mayors ==
- Brampton: Ken Whillans
- Brantford: Dave Neumann (details)
- Burlington: Roly Bird
- Cambridge: Claudette Millar
- Cornwall: Brian Lynch
- East York: David Johnson (details)
- Etobicoke: Bruce Sinclair (details)
- Gloucester: Harry Allen (details)
- Guelph: John Counsell
- Hamilton: Robert Morrow (details)
- Kingston: John Gerretsen
- Kitchener: Dom Cardillo
- London: Tom Gosnell
- Markham: Carole Bell
- Mississauga: Hazel McCallion
- Nepean: Ben Franklin (details)
- Niagara Falls: Bill Smeaton
- North Bay: Stan Lawlor
- North York: Mel Lastman (details)
- Oakville: Bill Perras
- Oshawa: Allan Pilkey
- Ottawa: Jim Durrell (details)
- Peterborough: Sylvia Sutherland
- Sarnia: Marceil Saddy
- Sault Ste. Marie: Joe Fratesi
- Scarborough: Gus Harris (details)
- St. Catharines: Joe McCaffery
- Sudbury: Peter Wong
- Thunder Bay: Jack Masters
- Timmins: Vic Power
- Toronto: Art Eggleton (details)
- Waterloo: Marjorie Carroll
- Welland: Roland Hardy
- Windsor: David Burr
- York: Alan Tonks(details)

== Brantford ==
1985 Brantford municipal election: Mayor of Brantford
Candidate	Votes	%
(x)Dave Neumann	14,285	83.77
William Stewart	1,589	9.32
Andy Woolley	1,178	6.91
Total valid votes	17,052	100

== Sudbury ==
1985 Sudbury municipal election: Mayor of Sudbury
Candidate	Votes	%
(x)Peter Wong	elected	
Diane Marleau	defeated	
Ted Szilva	defeated	
other candidates?		
Total votes cast		

Sudbury also held a referendum on a proposal that the city be declared a nuclear-free zone, which passed by a two-to-one margin.
