= Sharon Murdock =

Canadian politician (1946–2024)

Ontario MPP
- In office 1990–1995
- Preceded by: Sterling Campbell
- Succeeded by: Rick Bartolucci
- Constituency: Sudbury

Personal details
- Born: June 29, 1946 Sudbury, Ontario, Canada
- Died: July 9, 2024 (aged 78)
- Party: New Democrat
- Education: Laurentian University; University of Windsor
- Occupation: Teacher, lawyer

Sharon Margaret Murdock (June 29, 1946 – July 9, 2024) was a Canadian politician and administrator in Ontario. She was a New Democratic Party member of the Legislative Assembly of Ontario from 1990 to 1995.

== Background ==
Murdock was educated at Ottawa Teacher's College, the University of Windsor and Laurentian University, receiving a law degree in 1984. She worked as an elementary school teacher from 1967 to 1979, and was a principal and teacher with the Ministry of Education's Northern Corps from 1975 to 1979, working in isolated communities. She left her teaching career to attend the School of Commerce in Windsor. Just before entering her last semester for a B.Comm., Murdock embarked on a legal career, articling with the Crown Attorney in Windsor in 1984-85. She was called to the bar in 1986.

== Politics ==
Murdock was involved with the NDP for many years before running for office herself. She worked for the party from 1968 to 1975, and was a canvass organizer for Bud Wildman's first campaign in the 1975 provincial election. She was a constituency assistant to Elie Martel in 1986-87, and to his daughter Shelley Martel from 1987 to 1990.

She ran for the Ontario legislature in the 1987 provincial election, finishing third against Liberal Sterling Campbell in a close three-way race in Sudbury. She ran again in the 1990 provincial election, and defeated Campbell by 3,397 votes amid an historic majority government victory for the NDP. She served as parliamentary assistant to the Minister of Labour for the entirety of the Rae government's time in office. In early 1995, she announced over one million dollars in government support for aboriginal programs.

In 1994, Murdock introduced a Private Member's Bill to make the common loon Ontario's official bird, the Avian Emblem Act. Murdock introduced a Private Bill which resulted in granting Nipissing University its charter. As well, she was responsible for passing legislation where a 'proxy' job could be used as a comparator for female jobs that did not have similar occupations from which to determine 'equal pay for equal work'. Of the twelve pieces of legislation she carried through the House, these three are the only ones that survived the Harris onslaught in 1995.

The NDP were defeated in the 1995 provincial election, and Murdock lost her seat to Liberal Rick Bartolucci by over 3,500 votes.

== Later life and death ==
Murdock worked to incorporate the Sudbury & Manitoulin Training & Adjustment Board (now called Workforce Planning for Sudbury & Manitoulin) and acted as executive director for 16 years. The Workforce Planning office continues to lead the Education Co-ordinating Team (ECT) established by Murdock where all four school boards, the two colleges, the university, the City and First Nations are represented at monthly meetings to discuss like interests. She was also very instrumental in having Women of the Future (a career exploration and motivational day for disengaged girls in grades 9 & 10) become a signature event for the Workforce Planning office.

Murdock retired December 2011 and had recently started her own consulting business focusing on workforce planning, research, feasibility studies and community capacity building. Murdock died on July 9, 2024, at the age of 78.
