= Frank Mazzuca (Canadian politician) =

Canadian politician (1922–2009)

Mayor of Capreol, Ontario, Canada
- In office 1975–1997
- Preceded by: Harold Prescott
- Succeeded by: Dave Kilgour

Chair of the Regional Municipality of Sudbury
- In office October 5, 1998 – December 31, 2000
- Preceded by: Doug Craig
- Succeeded by: position abolished

Personal details
- Born: March 15, 1922 Calabria, Kingdom of Italy
- Died: September 9, 2009 (aged 87) Sudbury, Ontario, Canada
- Profession: businessman

Frank Roger Mazzuca, Sr. (15 March 1922 - 9 September 2009) was a Canadian politician and businessman in Capreol, Ontario. He served as mayor of the town from 1975 to 1997, and as chair of the Regional Municipality of Sudbury from 1998 to 2000.

== Early life ==
Born in Italy, he moved to Capreol with his family at the age of seven. He worked in his parents' family-owned grocery store in childhood.

As a young man Mazzuca went to work for CN Rail, where he was a brakeman for 37 years. In 1950 he opened Mazzuca Furniture & Appliance Company.

== Political career ==
First elected to the town council of Capreol in 1957, Mazzuca served as the town's mayor from 1975 to 1997. In that year, he ran for chair of the Regional Municipality of Sudbury, losing to Peter Wong — however, Wong died in office the following year, and Mazzuca ran in and won the resulting by-election. He served as the final chair of the regional municipality, which was amalgamated into the current city of Greater Sudbury in 2001.

During Mazzuca's term as regional chair, Sudbury resident Ron Billard wrote a letter to the editor of the Sudbury Star, criticizing Mazzuca for using a limousine to travel to Toronto for a meeting at Queen's Park; Mazzuca's response to the letter was "just tell the stupid bastard to call me on the phone". Billard sued for defamation, demanding $150,000 in damages, although the suit was settled out of court for $7,500; Mazzuca in turn sued the Star for printing a comment he had intended off the record.

Although a longtime opponent of proposals to amalgamate the regional municipality of Sudbury into a single city, he endorsed the proposal in 1999 after provincial Municipal Affairs minister Steve Gilchrist indicated that reform of the region's existing model of government was inevitable. In a reform model proposed by Mazzuca, the existing number of councillors across the seven municipal councils of the region would have been retained on the new merged council, in order to protect the level of representation in the suburban towns; however, in the model that was ultimately implemented, the number of councillors was significantly reduced. As a result, following his retirement Mazzuca went back to being a bluntly outspoken advocate of holding a deamalgamation referendum. The community newspaper Northern Life quoted Mazzuca as saying that "It was a great thing to call up the mayor and say, 'A dog shit on my lawn, what are you going to do about it?' When they'd call me I'd tell them, 'Not my dog, not my lawn, not my shit.'"

Mazzuca was a recipient of the Queen Elizabeth II Golden Jubilee Medal in 2002.
