= Peter Wong (Canadian politician) =

Canadian politician (1931–1998)

Mayor of Sudbury
- In office 1982–1991
- Preceded by: Maurice Lamoureux
- Succeeded by: Jim Gordon

Chair of the Regional Municipality of Sudbury
- In office 1997–1998
- Preceded by: Tom Davies
- Succeeded by: Doug Craig

Personal details
- Born: July 8, 1931 Moose Jaw, Saskatchewan, Canada
- Died: June 6, 1998 (aged 66) Regina, Saskatchewan, Canada
- Occupation: engineer

Peter Wong (July 8, 1931 – June 6, 1998) was a Canadian politician who was Mayor of Sudbury from 1982 to 1991, and chair of the Regional Municipality of Sudbury from 1997 until his death the following year.

== Early life ==
Born in Moose Jaw, Saskatchewan and raised in the village of Radville, Wong studied civil engineering at the University of Denver, graduating in 1954. He worked for Ontario's Department of Highways, and spent two years working on infrastructure projects in Thailand, before taking a job with Sudbury's municipal public works department. In this position he played a key role in the process that saw the Nelson Street bridge, formerly the primary connection between the downtown core and the Ramsey Lake neighbourhood, replaced with the extension of Paris Street across the Bridge of Nations.

By the early 1980s he had been promoted to the city's senior engineer, as well as serving as a trustee on the Rainbow District School Board.

Wong was also an avid curler, and played second for the Northern Ontario team at the 1973 Macdonald Brier, on a team skipped by Don Harry. The rink went 3–7 at the event.

Wong and his wife Lynn had two children.

== Mayor of Sudbury ==
After losing his job with the city in a round of austerity measures incumbent mayor Maurice Lamoureux had implemented in early 1982, Wong successfully challenged Lamoureux for the mayoralty in that year's municipal election. He was the city's first non-European mayor, as well as the first Chinese Canadian mayor of a major city and only the third Chinese Canadian mayor ever elected in any municipality.

His term as mayor was marked by efforts to diversify the city's mining-based economy, as well as expansion of the city's extensive environmental remediation programs. Notable projects taking place during his term included the creation of Science North, an interactive science museum which launched in 1984, and the city's hosting of the 1988 World Junior Championships in Athletics. He also launched Action Sudbury, a municipal awareness campaign to combat drinking and driving, in 1984.

In 1989, Peter and Lynn Wong attended a parade in Sudbury, Massachusetts, as special guests on the occasion of that town's 350th anniversary.

In the 1991 municipal elections, former mayor Jim Gordon sought a return to office, and Wong was defeated.

He subsequently served on several municipal and provincial boards and commissions, including as a vice-chair of the Ontario Highway Transport Board and as chair of the Northern Ontario Heritage Fund, as a chair of the local United Way, and as a board member of the Sudbury Regional Hospital.

== Regional chair ==
In the 1997 municipal elections, the provincial government reformed the structure of the regional municipality, making the position of regional council chair a generally elected position for the first time. The position had previously been filled by a vote within council. Wong stood as a candidate and won over challenger Frank Mazzuca, becoming the municipality's first elected regional chair.

After serving less than a year in that office, Wong died of a heart attack on June 6, 1998, while attending a meeting of the Federation of Canadian Municipalities in Regina. On June 8, tributes to Wong were delivered in the Legislative Assembly of Ontario by Rick Bartolucci and Shelley Martel, and on June 10, a tribute was delivered in the House of Commons by Ray Bonin.

Mazzuca, Wong's challenger in the 1997 election, won the by-election following Wong's death, and was the final chair of the regional municipality before its amalgamation into the current city of Greater Sudbury.
