= Herbert Orliffe =

Canadian politician (c.1905–1967)

Herbert Orliffe (c.1905 – 3 July 1967) was a municipal politician in Toronto, Ontario, Canada. He immigrated with his family from Newcastle, England at age 8 and settled in Toronto. His father operated a grocery store on Harbord Street. He first attended the University of Toronto and then received a law degree from Osgoode Hall Law School.

Orliffe was an active member of the CCF party and was first elected as a school board trustee for Ward 4. He eventually became chair of the Toronto Board of Education. He was elected to city council and ran for a position on the Board of Control in 1960, but lost by a slim margin. A month later he was appointed to the Board after William Allen resigned to become chair of Metro Toronto. He served seven years on the Board of Control, gaining a reputation as a quiet Controller who worked out compromises between his more vocal fellows. In his last months he was deeply engaged in pushing for the construction of the Toronto Eaton Centre.

He died unexpectedly of a heart attack early in the morning of 3 July 1967 at age 62. He was married with four children. He was replaced on the Board of Control by alderman Fred Beavis.
