= Jean Newman =

Canadian politician (1905–1971)

Jean Dorothy Newman (1905 in Née Reading – October 4, 1971) was a municipal politician in Toronto, Ontario, Canada. She was the vice-chairman of the Toronto Board of Control and president of the Toronto City Council. She was the first woman elected to Toronto’s Board of Control and the first woman to run for Mayor of Toronto.

== Family and personal life ==
=== Early life and education ===
Jean Dorothy Newman was born in 1905 at El Paso, Texas. Her father, W. G. Reading was a chief dispatcher for the Southern Pacific Railway. Her mother, Mrs. W. G. Reading, was a business woman who specialized in real estate. Newman's maternal grandfather, Donald Mackay Gordon, emigrated to Canada from Scotland. He served as Mayor of Wingham and built the first brick house in Listowel.

When Newman was three months old, the family relocated to Toronto, where they resided on Rushmore Road. She attended Oakwood Collegiate Institute as her secondary school, and the University of Toronto for post secondary education, where she majored in arts. She had always been interested in religious and charity organizations. She had presided over multiple associations within the university, such as the Home and School Association, the University College Alumnae, St. George’s United Church WMS, and she was on the board of the United Church of Training School.

=== Personal life ===
In 1925, she married T. Campbell Newman, who was majoring in chemistry at University of Toronto. They went on to have two kids, George and Margaret. Her grandson is journalist and news anchor Kevin Newman.

In her free time, she made oil paintings. She had multiple exhibitions, and her house is home to a collection of both her own work and that of other Canadian artists. She had always been a public speaker, winning gold and silver medals in public speaking competitions.

== Political career ==
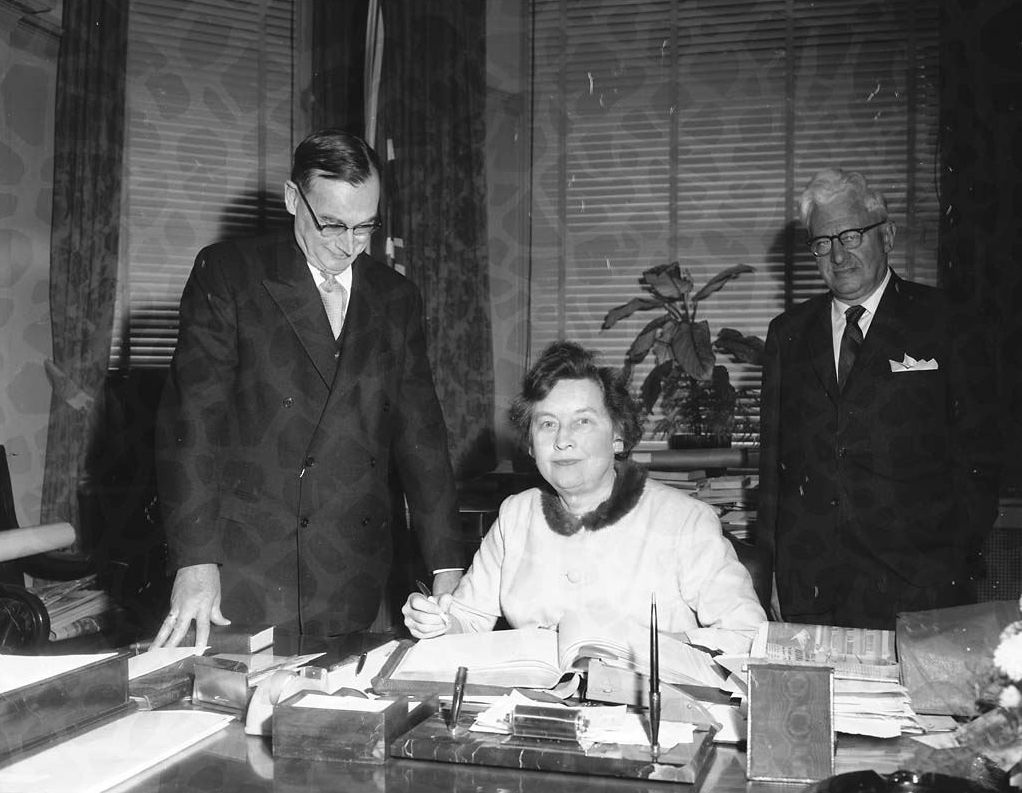
Newman, sworn in as controller in 1954

Newman had always been interested in public service. She was a trustee of the Board of Education from 1951 to 1954. In 1954, she moved to city council where she served in Ward 9 in 1955 and 1956. In 1956, Newman was elected to the Board of Control as the budget chief, she was the first woman to do so. In the 1958 Toronto municipal election; she announced her intention to run for mayor of Toronto, challenging, then incumbent, Nathan Phillips. In 1960 mayoral election, Newman placed third behind Phillips and former mayor of Toronto Allan Lamport. In 1962, she ran as a Liberal candidate in by-election for the riding of Eglinton. The riding leaned towards the tory party, and Newman lost to Progressive Conservative Leonard Mackenzie Reilly

== Later life and death ==
After the loss of the By election, Newman retired from politics and focused her attention on charitable work. In 1968, her husband died and in 1970, she got remarried to Ian Urquhart, taking on the name Jean Newman-Urquhart. Newman died a year later, in 1971 from a stroke. She was 66.
