= Rick Bartolucci =

Canadian politician (born 1943)

The Honourable Rick Bartolucci ECO

Ontario MPP
- In office 1995–2014
- Preceded by: Sharon Murdock
- Succeeded by: Joe Cimino
- Constituency: Sudbury

Personal details
- Born: October 10, 1943 (age 82) Sudbury, Ontario
- Party: Liberal
- Education: Laurentian University; North Bay Teacher's College
- Occupation: Teacher

Rick Bartolucci (born October 10, 1943) is a former politician in Ontario, Canada. He was a Liberal member of the Legislative Assembly of Ontario from 1995 to 2014. He represented the riding of Sudbury and was a cabinet minister in the government of Dalton McGuinty.

== Background ==
Bartolucci was born in Sudbury, has degrees from Laurentian University and the North Bay Teacher's College, and worked as a teacher and school principal for thirty years before becoming an MPP.

== Politics ==
=== Municipal ===
He was a Sudbury alderman and regional councillor from 1979 to 1982 and again from 1985 to 1991, and served as the city's deputy mayor for a time.

=== Provincial ===
Bartolucci was elected to the Ontario legislature in the 1995 provincial election, defeating New Democratic Party incumbent Sharon Murdock. The Progressive Conservative Party of Mike Harris won a majority government in this election, and Bartolucci entered the legislature as a member of the Official Opposition. He was appointed as his party's critic for Northern Development and Culture and Communications. In December 1995, he helped organize a meeting at Queen's Park where artists and cultural workers criticized the Harris government's cuts to the arts sector. He later criticized the Harris government's decision to close two of Sudbury's three hospitals, arguing that it would compromise patient care.

Bartolucci was one of the three MPPs prevented from attending the Harris government's first Speech from the Throne in September 1995, when police officers contracted by the government to guard against protesters refused them entry into the legislature. The other MPPs were veteran opposition member Sean Conway and cabinet minister Cam Jackson. Many opposition legislators and journalists later described the police presence as excessive. A similar incident took place in March 1996, when riot police contracted by the Harris government burst into Bartolucci's legislative office without any warning or explanation, just before a melee with protesting public service workers. The police actions were widely criticized on this occasion as well.

Bartolucci was a co-manager of Dwight Duncan's bid to lead the Ontario Liberal Party in 1996, and moved to the camp of Gerard Kennedy when Duncan was eliminated on the third ballot of the party's leadership convention. Kennedy was defeated on the final ballot by Dalton McGuinty.

Bartolucci introduced a Private Member's Bill in early 1997 to limit class sizes in Ontario's public and separate schools. The government dropped this bill from the legislative agenda in January 1998. He later introduced a bill giving police the power to apprehend any person under eighteen who was involved in prostitution, and take that person to a safe house. The government introduced legislation modeled on Bartolucci's proposal in 2000, and passed it into law in June 2002. Fourteen months later, Bartolucci complained that the law had not yet been enacted.

Bartolucci was re-elected by an increased margin in the 1999 provincial election, as the Progressive Conservatives won a second majority government. He was appointed to the Liberal Party's election committee after the campaign, and later served as Chief Opposition Whip. In 2000, he criticized the provincial government for requiring that cancer patients in Northern Ontario pay most of their transportation costs to and from treatment in other areas, while patients referred from Toronto to Sudbury were provided with free transportation and lodging. Bartolucci indicated that he was exploring the possibility of a class-action lawsuit on the matter.

Bartolucci made frequent calls for Highway 69 to be twinned between Sudbury and Parry Sound, citing a growing number of fatal accidents in the area. He also chaired the JoeMac committee, which undertook a national campaign to have the killers of Sudbury police officer Joe MacDonald moved to a maximum security prison. The group also opposed what it described as lenient treatment for federal offenders.

=== Minister of Northern Development and Mines ===
Bartolucci was re-elected in 2003 as the Liberals won a majority government across the province. Bartolucci was endorsed by the Sudbury Police Association in the 2003 provincial election. On October 23, 2003, he was appointed as Minister of Northern Development and Mines in the newly formed government of Dalton McGuinty.

In early 2004, Bartolucci re-designated the Muskoka District as a part of southern rather than northern Ontario. The area had been a part of southern Ontario before 2000, when the Harris government chose to include it as part of the north. Bartolucci had criticized this decision at the time, arguing that it would allow wealthy cottage communities to access funds earmarked for northern development. Bartolucci declined to intervene when Inco announced the closure of its Copper Cliff copper refinery in May 2005, saying that he would not compel a company to keep open a financially troubled entity. The United Steelworkers of America protested this decision.

Bartolucci announced in March 2004 that he would end the previous government's efforts to privatize the Ontario Northland Transportation Commission. He also called for the Northern Ontario Heritage Fund to re-focus its attention on job creation, with support from the private sector. The North Bay Chamber of Commerce and the union representing Ontario Northland Transportation Commission workers demanded the resignation or retirement of Bartolucci, claiming a negative impact on the economy of northern Ontario.

In June 2005, Bartolucci announced a twelve-year project for the expansion of Highway 69. In March 2006 he brought forward a new provincial mining strategy. The journal Mineweb called the plan a way to promote long-term sustainability and global competitiveness.

Bartolucci presided over the opening of Ontario's first diamond mine in June 2006, and spoke of "limitless" potential for growth in the field. The McGuinty government later proposed a new tax on diamond mining. After criticism by groups such as DeBeers Canada, Bartolucci modified the tax to include deductions for new mining construction, and for expenditures made through agreements with aboriginal communities.

Bartolucci criticized the federal government of Stephen Harper in April 2006, arguing that its proposed settlement of a softwood lumber dispute with the United States would amount to "selling out Ontario".

In August 2006, Justice Patrick Smith of the Ontario Superior Court issued a ruling against the mining exploration company Platinex Inc. in its ongoing battle with the remote Kitchenuhmaykoosib Inninuwug aboriginal community. Platinex was ordered not to work at the site for five months, and was ordered to participate in a consultation process involving the province. Bartolucci argued that this decision would not "impact the legitimacy of other mining claims in Ontario". Others disputed his interpretation.

In mid-2007, the Ardoch Algonquin and Shabot Obaadjiwan First Nations began a protest against proposed uranium mining in the Sharbot Lake area. The protesters, who were supported by several members of the local non-aboriginal community, noted that they had not been consulted by the province before the company Frontenac Ventures began prospecting in the area. A spokesperson for Bartolucci's office confirmed that the province had a legal obligation to consult with First Nations communities before allowing exploration, and said that the province was attempting to "establish better processes" in dealing with such matters.

=== Minister of Community Safety and Correctional Services ===
Bartolucci was re-elected in the 2007 provincial election, in which the McGuinty government was re-elected with a second majority. On October 30, 2007, he was appointed as Minister of Community Safety and Correctional Services.

Bartolucci amended the province's sex offender registry in December 2007, after the provincial Auditor General reported that prisoners released from federal institutions had been omitted from the list.

Bartolucci introduced new animal protection legislation in April 2008 and the province's new Animal Welfare Act was officially proclaimed in March 2009. The law requires that veterinarians report suspected cases of animal abuse, gives legal protection for veterinarians who make good faith reports, and increases penalties for animal abuse.

Bartolucci rejected calls for a moratorium on taser use in June 2008, when an Ontario resident died after being tasered in a confrontation with police. Amnesty International was among the groups calling for a moratorium on taser use. In 2009, he rejected a request that Ontario ban taser use on minors.

Bartolucci and Attorney General Chris Bentley appealed to the federal government to introduce stricter gun control legislation in March 2008, including a ban on handguns. They also criticized the federal government for extending an amnesty to gun owners who refuse to register their firearms. In April 2009, Bartolucci requested that the federal government reconsider its plans to weaken the provisions of the Canadian Firearms Registry.

Bartolucci announced in October 2008 that the McGuinty government would overhaul Ontario's forensic pathology system and provide compensation for past miscarriages of justice, after receiving a report from Justice Stephen Goudge. This report confirmed previous media revelations that several people had been wrongly convicted of serious crimes due to errors made by discredited pathologist Charles Randal Smith. Bartolucci personally apologized on behalf of the government to those who suffered as a result of these errors and later announced that the McGuinty government would adopt all of the Goudge Report's recommendations into law. Among other things, the report called for the creation of an oversight council to monitor Ontario's chief coroner and chief forensic pathologist, the creation of a public complaints committee, and a provincial registry of pathologists.

Bartolucci rejected calls for a provincial inquiry into a native land dispute at Caledonia. He argued that this dispute was a federal issue.

In October 2009, Bartolucci faced some criticism from his constituents for avoiding a vote on Peter Kormos' private member's bill to ban the use of replacement workers during a strike. With Vale Inco workers in Sudbury on strike, Bartolucci chose to remain neutral on the legislation in the hope that his position would encourage the company and the striking workers to return to the bargaining table.

He announced on February 7, 2013, that he would not run for re-election in the 41st Ontario general election.

=== Cabinet positions ===
McGuinty ministry, Province of Ontario (2003–2013)
Cabinet posts (4)
Predecessor	Office	Successor
Michael Gravelle	Minister of Northern Development and Mines; 2011–2013	Michael Gravelle
Jim Bradley	Minister of Municipal Affairs and Housing; 2010–2011	Kathleen Wynne
Monte Kwinter	Minister of Community Safety and Correctional Services; 2007–2010	Jim Bradley
Jim Wilson	Minister of Northern Development and Mines; 2003–2007	Michael Gravelle

== Electoral record ==
2011 Ontario general election
Party	Candidate	Votes	%	±%
Liberal	Rick Bartolucci	13,752	42.26%	-16.51
New Democratic	Paul Loewenberg	13,251	40.72%	+13.59
Progressive Conservative	Gerry Labelle	4,409	13.55%	+5.62
Green	Pat Rogerson	925	2.84%	-2.05
Total valid votes		32,544	100.00	

2007 Ontario general election: Sudbury
Party	Candidate	Votes	%	±%	Expenditures
Liberal	Rick Bartolucci	19,307	58.77	−10.21	$ 65,502.20
New Democratic	Dave Battaino	8,914	27.13	+13.13	38,488.63
Progressive Conservative	Louis Delongchamp	2,605	7.93	−6.26	12,594.00
Green	David Sylvestre	1,608	4.89	+2.07	1,520.11
Family Coalition	Carita Murphy-Marketos	293	0.89		3,118.15
Independent	David Popescu	124	0.38		17.90
Total valid votes / expense limit		32,851	100.0	−8.00	$ 69,838.20
Rejected, unmarked and declined ballots		201	0.61	−0.15	
Turnout		33,052	51.11	−4.84	
Electors on the lists		64,665		+0.56	
Liberal hold		Swing		−11.67	
Note: Percentage changes are factored for redistribution.
Source(s) "General Election Poll by Poll Results – Electoral District 088 Sudbury" (PDF). Elections Ontario. "2007 Annual Returns, Candidate and Constituency Associations".

2003 Ontario general election: Sudbury
Party	Candidate	Votes	%	±%	Expenditures
Liberal	Rick Bartolucci	24,631	68.98	+10.27	$ 58,280.81
Progressive Conservative	Mila Wong	5,068	14.19	−15.39	34,319.74
New Democratic	Harvey Wyers	4,999	14.00	+3.49	16,359.88
Green	Luke Norton	1,009	2.83		508.44
Total valid votes / expense limit		35,707	100.00	−3.54	$ 61,731.84
Rejected, unmarked and declined ballots		274	0.76	+0.10	
Turnout		35,981	55.95	+0.26	
Eligible voters		64,304		−3.89	
Liberal hold		Swing		+12.83	
Source(s) "General Election of October 2, 2003 — Summary of Valid Ballots by Candidate". Elections Ontario. "General Election of October 2, 2003 — Statistical Summary". "2003 Election Returns - Candidate and Constituency Association – Candidate Campaign Return (CR-1)".

1999 Ontario general election: Sudbury
Party	Candidate	Votes	%	±%	Expenditures
Liberal	Rick Bartolucci	21,732	58.71	+18.05	$ 52,531.80
Progressive Conservative	Mila Wong	10,948	29.58	+2.93	61,776.00
New Democratic	Paul Chislett	3,891	10.51	−18.12	Not Available
Natural Law	Bernard Fram	184	0.50	−0.54	0.00
Independent	Ed Pokonzie	159	0.43	+0.02	Not Available
Independent	David Popescu	103	0.28		123.60
Total valid votes / expense limit		37,017	100.0	+21.87	$ 64,227.84
Rejected, unmarked and declined ballots		245	0.66	−0.66	
Turnout		37,262	55.69	−6.41	
Electors on the lists		66,904		+34.99	
Note: Percentage change figures are not factored for redistribution.
Source(s) "General Election of June 3 1999 – Summary of Valid Ballots by Candidate". Elections Ontario. "General Election of June 3 1999 – Statistical Summary". "1999 Candidate and Constituency Associations – Candidate Campaign Return (CR-1)".

1995 Ontario general election: Sudbury
Party	Candidate	Votes	%	Expenditures
Liberal	Rick Bartolucci	12,349	40.66	$ 38,419.00
New Democratic	Sharon Murdock	8,698	28.64	45,265.43
Progressive Conservative	Richard Zanibbi	8,093	26.64	43,588.00
Independent	Don Scott	506	1.67	459.00
Natural Law	David Gordon	315	1.04	0.00
Green	Lewis Poulin	290	0.95	69.68
Independent	Ed Pokonzie	123	0.40	0.00
Total valid votes / expense limit		30,374	100.00	$ 46,140.00
Rejected, unmarked and declined ballots		405	1.32	
Turnout		30,779	62.10	
Eligible voters		49,562		
Source(s) "General Election of June 8 1995 – Summary of Valid Ballots by Candidate". Elections Ontario. "General Election of June 8 1995 – Statistical Summary". "1995 Details of Candidate Income and Expenses" ( Word'95 .doc files (3.16MB)). & "1995 Summary of Income and Campaign Expenses" ( 146KB).

All provincial electoral information is taken from Elections Ontario. The expenditure entries for all elections after 1995 are taken from official candidate reports as listed by Elections Ontario. The figures cited are the Total Candidate's Campaign Expenses Subject to Limitation, and include transfers from constituency associations.
