= Health Sciences North =

Health Sciences North Horizon Santé-Nord
- North East Local Health Integration Network

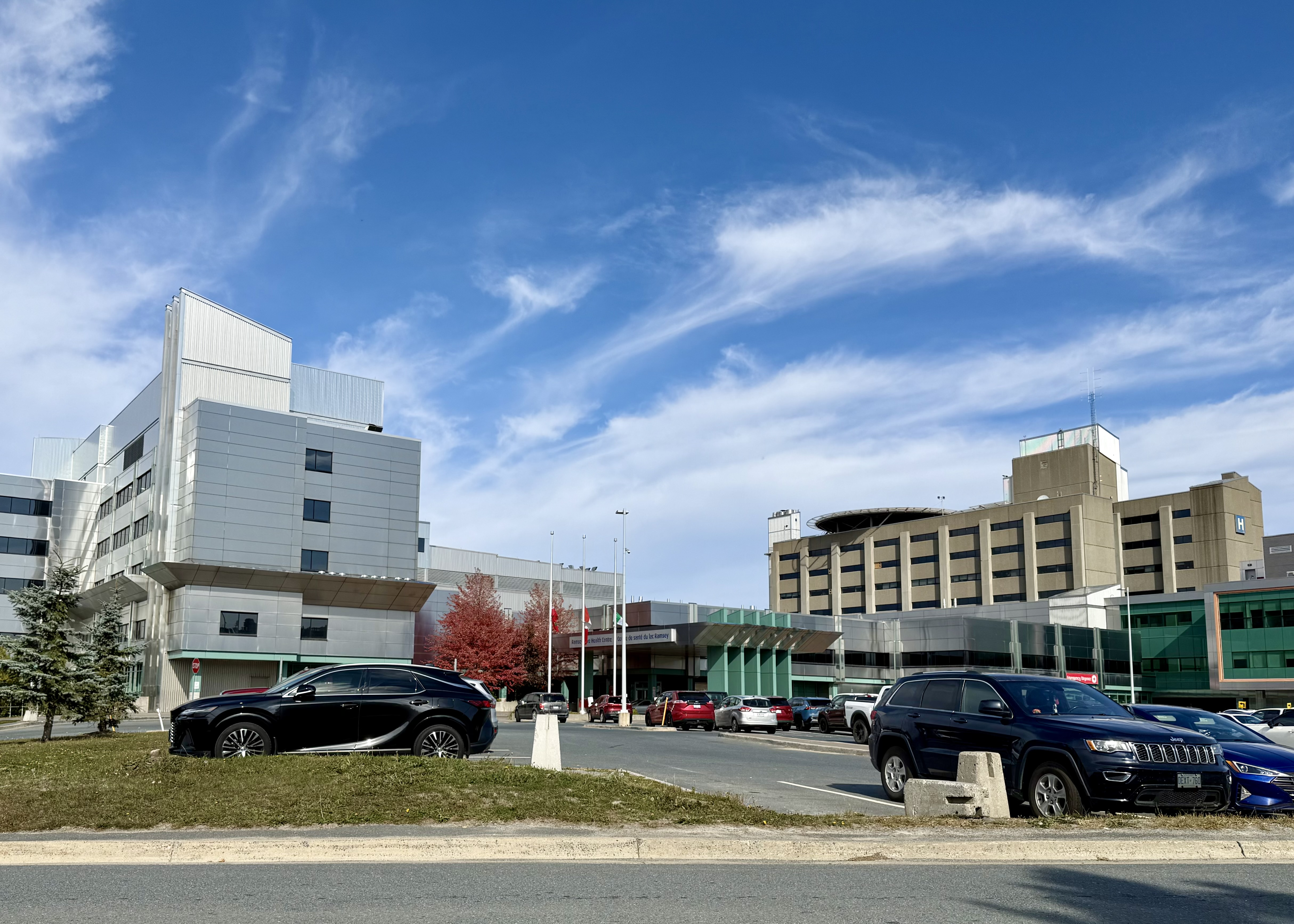
- Ramsey Lake Health Centre

- Location in Ontario

Geography
- Location: 41 Ramsey Lake Road; Sudbury, Ontario; P3E 5J1
- Coordinates: 46.4678°N 80.9964°W

Organisation
- Care system: Medicare
- Type: Teaching
- Affiliated university: Cambrian College, Collège Boréal, Lakehead University, Laurentian University, Northern Ontario School of Medicine

Services
- Emergency department: Yes
- Beds: 633

Helipads
- Helipad: TC LID: CSL8

History
- Founded: 1997

Links
- Website: hsnsudbury.ca/en

Health Sciences North (French: Horizon Santé-Nord) is a teaching hospital in Greater Sudbury, Ontario, Canada. HSN offers a variety of programs and services, with regional programs in the areas of cardiac care, oncology, nephrology, trauma and rehabilitation. Patients visit HSN from a wide geographic area across northeastern Ontario.

== History ==
HSN was formed through the amalgamation of three separate hospitals in 2010. The city formerly had three community hospitals: Sudbury General (completed in 1950), Sudbury Memorial (completed in 1956), and Laurentian Hospital (completed in 1975), and one mental health and community service facility, Sudbury Algoma Hospital. The three officially amalgamated in 1997 to form one corporation, the Hôpital Régional de Sudbury Regional Hospital (HRSRH), but remained a multi-site facility. In 2000, the construction of the new one-site hospital began and was completed in 2010.

In October 2012, the new one-site hospital was renamed "Health Sciences North" as it evolved into an academic research centre, as well as a hospital. In 2013, HSN implemented a new strategic plan that focused on delivering patient-centred care, research, teaching and learning in northeastern Ontario and beyond.

== Services ==
Health Sciences North offers a variety of programs and services, with regional programs in the areas of cardiac care, oncology, nephrology, trauma and rehabilitation. HSN's patients visit from a wide area across northeastern Ontario.

HSN employs 3,898 people, 270 physicians and has 586 volunteers - it is the single largest employer in Sudbury. In a typical year the hospital sees 328,207 outpatients and 61,540 people in the emergency department, and admits 22,633 people.

Services include:

- Critical care
  - Intensive care unit
  - Respiratory
  - Cardiac care
  - Cardiac rehabilitation services
- Emergency and ambulatory care
  - General medicine
  - Gastroenterology
  - Haematology
  - Infectious diseases
  - Stroke
- Medicine and rehabilitation
  - Acquired brain injury
  - Intensive rehabilitation and outpatient rehabilitation
  - Chiropody
- Regional Cancer Program
  - Community Oncology Clinic Network
  - Dental oncology
  - Genetics
  - Preventative oncology and screening
  - Supportive care
  - Cancer research
- Diagnostic services
  - Diagnostic imaging
  - Laboratory services
  - Pharmacy services
  - Cytogenetics
  - Magnetic resonance imaging (MRI)
  - X-ray computed tomography (CT or CAT scan)
  - Ultrasound
  - Mammography
- Family and child
  - Perinatal/labour and delivery
  - Paediatrics
  - Children's Treatment Centre
  - Domestic violence/sexual assault treatment program
- Mental health and addiction
  - Seniors and rural outreach
  - Counseling and treatment
  - Crisis services
  - Developmental clinical services
- Surgical
  - Orthopedics
  - Ophthalmology
  - Neurosurgery
  - Urology
  - Cardiac surgery
  - Gynaecology
  - General surgery
  - Thoracic surgery
  - Otolaryngology (ENT)

== Abduction incident ==
On November 1, 2007, a Kirkland Lake woman, Brenda Batisse, abducted a newborn baby girl from the SRH's St. Joseph's Health Care Centre site shortly before 1 p.m. The hospital immediately went into lock-down and a province-wide Amber alert was issued. All highways leading out of the city were roadblocked. Batisse had already passed a roadblock location. She was subsequently arrested at her home in Kirkland Lake at 8:30 p.m., and the baby was returned to her mother unharmed.

Batisse, an Anishinaabe who had been physically, sexually and emotionally abused by several relatives throughout her childhood, had no prior criminal record and an extenuating mental health background. According to trial testimony, Batisse abducted the baby because her own pregnancy ended in a miscarriage shortly after she was physically assaulted in the summer of 2007, and she feared that her boyfriend would leave her if he found out.

Batisse was eventually sentenced to five years in prison for the abduction. On February 5, 2009, the Court of Appeal for Ontario ruled that the sentence was not consistent with the principles established by the Supreme Court of Canada around the sentencing of First Nations offenders, and reduced her sentence from five to 2.5 years.

== Computer virus ==
On January 16, 2019, Sudbury's Health Sciences North was hit by a computer virus that was affecting the medical records system, which is also used by 24 hospitals located in the north east region. As a preventive measure, systems at HSN were put on downtime, successfully avoiding dissemination of the virus. The other hospitals were not necessarily infected, but were impacted as a result.

== Heliport ==
The hospital is equipped with a rooftop heliport.
