= Regional Municipality of Sudbury =

- Dissolved Region
- Flag Seal Coat of arms

- Municipal boundaries of the former Regional Municipality of Sudbury.
- Coordinates: 46°29′24″N 81°00′36″W
- Country: Canada
- Province: Ontario
- Region: Northeastern Ontario
- Created: January 1, 1973
- Dissolved: December 31, 2000

Area
  - Total: 2,607 km^{2} (1,007 sq mi)

Population (1996)
  - Total: 164,049
- Time zone: UTC−05:00 (EST)
  - Summer (DST): UTC−04:00 (DST)
- Area code: 705
- Seat: Sudbury
- Municipalities: Sudbury, Capreol, Nickel Centre, Onaping Falls, Rayside-Balfour, Valley East, Walden

The Regional Municipality of Sudbury was a regional municipality that existed in Ontario, Canada, from 1973 to 2000, and was primarily centred on the city of Sudbury. It served as an upper-tier level of municipal government, aggregating municipal services on a region-wide basis like the counties and regional municipalities of Southern Ontario, and was the only upper-tier municipal government ever created in Northern Ontario. The regional municipality was dissolved with the creation of the amalgamated city of Greater Sudbury on January 1, 2001.

== Structure ==
The regional municipality expanded the boundaries of the city of Sudbury to annex the community of Copper Cliff, the unincorporated geographic township of Broder, and half of the unincorporated geographic township of Dill. The other half of Dill Township — including the community of Wanup — remained unincorporated, although it was subsequently annexed into Greater Sudbury in 2001.

The existing town of Capreol also expanded its boundaries in 1973 to annex the unincorporated communities of Selwood and Milnet. However, despite its status as part of the regional municipality, Statistics Canada did not include the town in Sudbury's Census Metropolitan Area for census purposes.

The towns of Nickel Centre, Onaping Falls, Rayside-Balfour, Valley East and Walden were all newly created by the amalgamation of several smaller towns and townships. Valley East, the largest and fastest-growing of the smaller towns, was granted city status in 1997. All of the municipalities were dissolved into the city of Greater Sudbury in 2001.

Each town and city in the regional municipality had its own mayor and council, and provided many of its own municipal services. The regional municipality had a regional council and chairman of its own, and provided certain services of region-wide interest, such as the regional road network, policing services, and social services.

This was the only regional municipality in Ontario not to originate from a former county government; instead, it was created out of the Sudbury District, which still surrounds the current city. Unlike the counties and regional municipalities of Southern Ontario, the more sparsely populated north is divided into unincorporated districts which do not serve as governing bodies. The Regional Municipality of Sudbury was — and the current city of Greater Sudbury still is — the only census division in Northern Ontario which has the structure and functionality of a Southern Ontario census division.

The regional offices were located at Civic Square, which was also the home of Sudbury's city council. Civic Square was renamed Tom Davies Square in 1997 following the retirement of longtime regional chairman Tom Davies.

== History ==
In the 1976 municipal election, the first municipal elections held after the creation of the regional municipality, voters in three of the suburban towns rejected the new level of government. The strongest opposition was in Onaping Falls, with the vote running against regional government by a margin of 20 to one. Despite the opposition, however, none of the towns were released from the regional government structure.

=== Amalgamation ===
Townships amalgamated with the Regional Municipality to form Greater Sudbury in 2001.

On January 1, 2001, all of the seven incorporated municipalities, as well as the regional municipality itself, were amalgamated into the united city of Greater Sudbury. The former municipal names remain in informal use to designate the different areas of the city. The name "Sudbury" itself may be ambiguous, however — depending on the context, it may denote either the old city in isolation, or a shorthand name for the entire amalgamated city.

In addition to the former towns and cities of the Regional Municipality of Sudbury, the unincorporated townships of Dill, Cleland, Fraleck, Parkin, Aylmer, Mackelcan, Rathbun and Scadding were also annexed into the new city. The townships of Cleland and Dill encompass the communities of Wanup and St. Cloud, while the townships of Fraleck, Parkin, Aylmer, Mackelcan, Rathbun and Scadding comprise a wilderness area on the northeast side of Lake Wanapitei which contains only a few recreational properties. However, the annexation of this latter area into the city resulted in Lake Wanapitei supplanting Ramsey Lake, near downtown Sudbury, as the world's largest lake contained entirely within the boundaries of a single city.

== Regional Council chairs ==
Prior to the 1997 municipal elections, the regional chairman was elected to the position from within the regional council — in that year, the position became generally elected by all voters in the regional municipality. Peter Wong, a former mayor of Sudbury, became the region's first elected chair, but died after just seven months in office. Following Wong's death, councillor Doug Craig served as interim chair until he was succeeded by Frank Mazzuca, a former mayor of Capreol, in a 1998 by-election.

1. Don Collins, 1973–1975
2. Joe Fabbro, 1975–1977
3. Doug Frith, 1977–1980
4. Delki Dozzi, 1980
5. George Lund, 1980–1981
6. Tom Davies, 1981–1997
7. Peter Wong, 1997–1998
8. Doug Craig, 1998
9. Frank Mazzuca, 1998–2000
