= Timeline of labour in Greater Sudbury =

The following is a timeline of the history of labour organizations in communities in and around Greater Sudbury, Ontario, Canada. Listings for incorporated townships which were later amalgamated with the City of Sudbury are noted separately.

== 1800s ==
- 1896 - First recorded strike in Sudbury, when workers building its new waterworks system struck for higher wages.

== 1900s ==
=== 1900s ===
- 1906 - Tailors' Union of America (Journeymen) Local No. 226 (Sudbury) founded on September 6.

=== 1910s ===
- 1911
  - Sudbury (87 members reported by 4 out of 5)
    - Bricklayers and Masons International Union Local No. 31 founded on Sept 16.
    - Amalgamated Society of Carpenters and Joiners local founded.
    - Hotel and Restaurant Employees' International Alliance and Bartenders' International League of America (AFL), Local No. 237 recorded.
    - Canadian Brotherhood of Railway Employees, Local No. 31 founded.
- 1912 - 5 unions in total, with 2 reporting 59 members combined.
- 1913
  - Sudbury (348 members reported by 5 out of 6)
    - International Brotherhood of Electrical Workers Local No. 374 founded on December 22.
    - Western Federation of Miners Local No. 183 founded on April 18.
    - United Association of Plumbers and Steam Fitters Local No. 620 existed.
    - Canadian Brotherhood of Railway Employees, Local No. 31 dissolved after being dormant.
    - Tailors' Local No. 226 dissolved.
  - Western Federation of Miners Local No. 182 (Garson Mines) founded on March 3.
- 1914
  - Copper Cliff
    - December: The socialist Peoples' Society takes over the Finland Hall at 353 Temperance Street. Within months, the hall would be destroyed by a fire which was rumoured to be deliberate.
  - Sudbury (306 members reported by 3 out of 5)
    - Carpenters and Joiners local listed as No. 2635.
- 1915
  - Sudbury (47 members reported by 2 out of 4)
    - United Association of Plumbers and Steam Fitters Local No. 620 dissolved.
- 1916
  - Sudbury
    - Bricklayers' Local 31 reports 15 members and is the only chartered local in the city that year.
    - International Union of Mine, Mill, and Smelter Workers (Mine-Mill) Local No. 183 dissolved after inactivity. This is the same Local 183; the Western Federation of Miners had renamed itself.
    - Carpenters and Joiners Local No. 2635 dissolved.
    - Restaurant and Bartenders' Local No. 237 dissolved.
- 1919
  - Sudbury Trades and Labour Council comes into existence. It represented eighteen local unions with a combined membership of 800.
  - Mine-Mill Local 116 forms in Coniston, but disappears by 1920.

=== 1920s ===
- 1920
  - Capreol (531 members reported by 6 out of 8 unions)
    - Brotherhood of Locomotive Engineers Local No. 728 is recorded.
    - Brotherhood of Locomotive Firemen and Enginemen Local No. 584 is recorded.
    - International Association of Machinists Local No. 518 is recorded.
    - United Brotherhood of Maintenance-of-Way Employees and Railway Shop Labourers Local No. 372 is recorded.
    - Canadian Brotherhood of Railway Employees Local No. 48 is recorded.
    - Brotherhood of Railroad Trainmen Local No. 894 is recorded.
    - Brotherhood of Railway Carmen of America Local No. 422 is recorded.
    - Order of Railway Conductors Local No. 645 is recorded.
  - Sudbury (284 union members reported by 7 out of 15 unions)
    - International Typographical Union Local No. 846 is chartered.
    - International Alliance of Theatrical Stage Employees and Moving Picture Machine Operators Local No. 634 is chartered.
    - Canadian Association of Stationary Engineers Local No. 35 is dissolved.
    - Retail Clerks' International Protective Association Local No. 505 is dissolved.
  - Mine-Mill Local No. 148 (Coniston) surrenders its charter.
- 1921
  - Capreol (449 union members reported by 6 out of 8 unions)
    - Canadian Association of Railway Enginemen Local No. 5 is chartered.
  - Copper Cliff: Vapaus reports Finnish Organization of Canada "reception committees" active.
  - Sudbury (121 union members reported by 4 out of 8 unions)
    - Locally published Finnish-language Communist Party newspaper Vapaus reports "reception committees" active.
    - United Brotherhood of Carpenters and Joiners Local No. 267 surrenders its charter.
    - Brotherhood of Painters, Decorators and Paperhangers of America Local No. 1152 surrenders its charter.
    - United Association of Journeymen Plumbers and Steam Fitters Local No. 369 surrenders its charter.
    - International Association of Bridge, Structural and Ornamental Iron Workers Local No. 264 surrenders its charter.
    - International Typographical Union Local No. 846 surrenders its charter.
    - International Union of Steam and Operating Engineers Local No. 753 surrenders its charter.
    - Brotherhood of Railway and Steamship Clerks, Freight Handlers, Express and Station Employees Local No. 1386 surrenders its charter.
    - Blacksmiths, Drop Forgers and Helpers Local No. 279 is recorded.
    - International Brotherhood of Boilermakers, Iron Ship Builders and Helpers Local No. 492 is recorded.
    - International Brotherhood of Dominion Express Employees Local No. 19 is recorded.
    - International Brotherhood of Electrical Workers Local No. 900 is recorded.
    - International Association of Machinists Local No. 1205 is recorded.
    - Canadian Brotherhood of Railroad Employees Local No. 136 is recorded.
    - Brotherhood of Railway Carmen of America Local No. 187 is recorded.
  - Worthington: Vapaus reports Finnish Organization of Canada "reception committees" active.
- 1922
  - Capreol (446 members reported by 7 out of 8 unions)
  - Sudbury
    - Sudbury Trades and Labour Council ceases to function.
    - Boilermakers Local No. 492 surrenders its charter.
- 1923
  - Capreol (465 members reported by 6 out of 9 unions)
  - Sudbury (46 members reported by 3 out of 4 unions)
- 1924
  - Capreol (506 members reported by 7 out of 9 unions)
  - Sudbury (121 members reported by 6 out of 7 unions)
    - Branch of Lumber Workers Industrial Union No. 120 (Industrial Workers of the World) is founded.
    - Railway and Steamship Clerks, Freight Handlers, Express and Station Employees Local No. 1093 is founded.
    - Tailors' Union of America (Journeymen) Local No. 69 is founded.
- 1925
  - Capreol (382 members reported by 6 out of 9 unions)
  - Sudbury (3,751 members reported by 6 out of 6 unions)
    - Branch of Lumber Workers Industrial Union No. 120 (IWW) reports membership of 3,650, meaning that an overwhelming majority of union members in the city were IWW members.
    - Journeymen Tailors Union of America Local No. 69 surrenders its charter.
- 1926
  - Capreol (367 members reported by 5 out of 9 unions)
    - International Brotherhood of Firemen and Oilers Local No. 919 is recorded.
  - Sudbury (89 members reported by 5 out of 7 unions)
    - Algoma Eastern System Federation, a federation of workers on the Algoma Eastern Railway, is dissolved.
    - Brotherhood of Canadian Pacific Express Employees Local No. 19 is recorded.
    - Pattern Makers League of North America Local No. 1205 chartered.
- 1927
  - Capreol (342 members reported by 6 out of 9 unions)
  - Sudbury (588 members reported by 6 out of 8 unions)
    - Lumber Workers Industrial Union of Canada branch is chartered.
- 1928
  - Capreol (409 members reported by 6 out of 8 unions)
    - International Brotherhood of Firemen and Oilers Local No. 919 surrenders its charter.
  - Sudbury (380 members reported by 6 out of 8 unions)
    - An Employment Service of Canada office opens.
    - At its ninth Ontario district conference on October 7, the Lumber Workers' Industrial Union (IWW) decides to select French- and Ukrainian-speaking delegates to travel to lumber camps in the Sudbury area.
    - Local association of the Federation of Women's Labour Leagues founded.
- 1929
  - Capreol (330 members reported by 6 out of 10 unions)
  - Sudbury (337 members reported by 5 out of 11 unions)
    - Order of Railroad Telegraphers, Div. No. 7 (Canadian Pacific Railway) is recorded with a Sudbury chairman covering lines headed east, and a Winnipeg chairman covering lines headed west, for Northwestern Ontario.
    - Provincial Federation of Ontario Fire Fighters Local No. 38 is recorded with its office at the Central Fire Station.
    - United Association of Journeymen Plumbers and Steamfitters Local No. 604 is recorded.
    - Communist Party of Canada attempts to run a candidate for the 1929 Ontario provincial election for Sudbury, but is rejected due to insufficient nominations.
    - International Association of Bridge, Structural and Ornamental Iron Workers local chartered.
    - International Brotherhood of Firemen and Oilers Local No. 398 chartered.
    - Lumber Workers Industrial Union of Canada dissolves its local branch, as well as many other branches in Northern Ontario.

=== 1930s ===
- 1930
  - Capreol (402 members reported by 8 out of 10 unions)
  - Sudbury (150 members reported by 5 out of 12 unions)
    - Sudbury Trades and Labour Council is re-founded with dual American Federation of Labor and Canadian Trades and Labour Congress charters. It represents 8 of the 12 local unions then in existence.
    - Bricklayers, Masons and Plasterers' International Union Local No. 28 is chartered.
    - International Brotherhood of Electrical Workers Local No. 473 is chartered.
    - Federated Association of Letter Carriers Local No. 61 is chartered.
    - Branch of Lumber and Agricultural Workers' Industrial Union of Canada is recorded.
    - Canadian Brotherhood of Railway Employees Local No. 248 is recorded alongside Local 136.
    - Branch of Mine Workers' Industrial Union (Workers' Unity League) is recorded.
    - Communist Party of Canada sponsors mayor and alderman candidates for Sudbury municipal elections, receiving 69 and 56 votes respectively.
    - May Day parade is broken up by police, who arrest eighteen participants, including Amos Hill. A demonstration is made outside the police station, with the fire hose used on the protestors and more arrests made. After being convicted in local courts, the convictions are overruled on appeal, with fines of $25 plus costs being upheld.
    - Lumber Workers' Industrial Union No. 120 (IWW) branch is dissolved.
    - Amos T. Hill runs under Communist Party of Canada endorsement for Nipissing (which at the time included Sudbury) in the 1930 federal election, receiving 584 votes and coming in third and last place.
  - Lumber and Agricultural Workers' Industrial Union branches founded in Sudbury, Turbine and Worthington, the latter with 41 members.
- 1931
  - Capreol (410 members reported by 8 out of 9 unions)
  - Sudbury (164 members reported by 9 out of 10 unions)
    - National headquarters of the Lumber and Agricultural Workers' Industrial Union located at 35 Lorne Street.
    - May Day meeting at Bell Park occurs, with no arrests or disruption.
- 1935 - Joseph Levert and Amos T. Hill run as Co-operative Commonwealth and Communist Party of Canada candidates for Nipissing in the 1935 federal election, receiving 2,236 and 931 votes respectively and coming in third and fifth place.
- 1936
  - An organizer for Mine-Mill, George W. "Scotty" Anderson, comes to Sudbury.
  - March: Mine-Mill Local 239 is chartered. By May, it has 150 members.

=== 1940s ===
- 1942
  - April 30: Mine-Mill Local 598 is chartered.
  - November: Inco management creates the United Copper-Nickel Workers (UCNW), nicknamed the "Nickel Rash", a company union intended to sabotage Mine-Mill's organizing campaign.
- 1943
  - Workers at the Sudbury and Copper Cliff Suburban Electric Railway unionize.
  - August: Robert Carlin (Co-operative Commonwealth) is elected for the Sudbury riding to the Ontario Legislative Assembly after running in the 1943 provincial election.
  - September: Sudbury Workers Organizing Committee (SWOC) is formed under the Canadian Congress of Labour to unionize Sudbury workers in diverse industries.
- 1944
  - April 21: Mine-Mill Local 598 is certified as representative of workers at Inco and Falconbridge.
  - May 3: Local 598 is certified at the Canadian Industries Limited sulfuric acid plant and a contract is signed there by June 15.
- 1945
  - June: J. Benonie Levert (Co-operative Commonwealth) receives 11,349 votes running for the Nipissing riding in the 1945 federal election, coming in second place.
  - June 28: Right-wing candidate James Kidd becomes president of Mine-Mill Local 598.
  - Robert Carlin (Co-operative Commonwealth) is re-elected to the Ontario Legislative Assembly in the 1945 provincial election.
- 1946 - James Kidd wins re-election as president of Mine-Mill Local 598.
- 1947 - On December 8, Nels Thibault wins the presidency of Mine-Mill Local 598, signalling a leftward turn in the local's politics.
- 1948
  - The Canadian Congress of Labour (CCL) and Co-operative Commonwealth Federation (CCF) begin to attack the leadership of Mine-Mill as a part of their anti-communist purges. Robert Carlin, then-MPP for Sudbury, falls victim and the CCF withdraws its endorsement of him as a candidate.
  - June: The United Mine Workers of America (UMWA), with the assistance of James Kidd, begins to raid workers at CIL, which had earlier been certified with Mine-Mill Local 598.
  - Robert Carlin finishes in second place for the Sudbury riding in the 1948 provincial election, running as an independent after being expelled from the Ontario CCF as a result of its anti-communist purges. The resulting disillusionment in the CCF destroys local support for the party for decades.
  - August 23: Mine-Mill is suspended as an affiliate of the Canadian Congress of Labour.
- 1949
  - May: The UMWA returns to raid workers at CIL. Its application for certification there is rejected by the Ontario Labour Relations Board.
  - In the 1949 federal election, Robert Carlin runs under a Farmer-Labour ticket against Co-operative Commonwealth candidate Willard H. Evoy in the newly created Sudbury riding, with the two coming in third and fourth place respectively, with 6,161 and 5,717 votes.
  - October: Mine-Mill Local 902 (General Workers' Union) is chartered to organize service workers in the Sudbury region.
  - October 7: Mine-Mill is expelled from the Canadian Congress of Labour (CCL) as a part of the CCL's anti-communist purges.

=== 1950s ===
- 1950
  - Mine-Mill's jurisdiction is granted to the United Steelworkers, which begins raiding Mine-Mill locals throughout North America, including Sudbury.
  - Mine-Mill Local 902 has twenty-four contracts by the end of the year (seventeen with hotels) and includes grocery chain stores and taxicab drivers.
- 1951 - Mike Solski becomes president of Mine-Mill Local 598, replacing Nels Thibault who had been promoted to regional director of District 8 (Canada) for the union.
- 1953 - Willard H. Evoy (Co-operative Commonwealth) receives 3,514 votes running for the Sudbury riding in the 1953 federal election, coming in third place with 16.49% of the vote.
- 1956
  - Mine-Mill holds its Canadian convention in Sudbury, which hosted the first concert performed by Paul Robeson outside of the United States after his travel ban.
  - Mine-Mill Local 902 holds fifty contracts in the Sudbury area.
  - May: James Kidd is expelled for life from Mine-Mill Local 598 due to his intentional efforts to sabotage the union; by then, Kidd had become a full-time staff members with the United Steelworkers.
- 1958 - First major mine workers' strike in Sudbury.

=== 1960s ===
- 1961 - Riot occurs at a Mine-Mill meeting at the Sudbury Arena on September 21 over a discussion of whether or not the local should affiliate with the United Steelworkers.
- 1965 - Sudbury Steelworkers Hall is opened on November 25.
- 1966 - Inco strike which was smaller than the one in 1958.
- 1967 - National Mine-Mill organization merges with the United Steelworkers, but Local 598 stays independent as a rump local.
- 1969 - Inco strike which was smaller than the one in 1958.

=== 1970s ===
- 1975 - Inco strike.
- 1978 - Inco strike of 1978-79 begins on September 15. 11,700 workers participated in the strike, which was organized by USW Local 6500 and which became known as one of the most significant labour disputes in Canadian history.
- 1979 - Inco strike of 1978-79 ends on June 7.

=== 1980s ===
- 1980 - Teachers with the Sudbury Public School Board go on strike from January to March.
- 1982 - Inco strike.

=== 1990s ===
- 1993 - Mine-Mill Local 598 affiliates with the Canadian Auto Workers, having been the last surviving Mine-Mill local for almost 30 years.

== 2000s ==
=== 2000s ===
- 2000 - Mine-Mill/CAW Local 598 members at Falconbridge Ltd. go on strike for six and a half months.
- 2004 - Mine-Mill/CAW Local 598 strikes at Falconbridge again, this time for three weeks. The strike was largely focused on Falconbridge's use of contractors, especially in newly opened mines.
- 2007 - 112 workers at eight Toronto-Dominion Bank (TD) branches in the Sudbury area go on strike, the first multi-branch banking strike in Canadian history. The strike continues for one month from June to July, when the workers vote by a majority of 56 percent to accept the contract offered by TD. The contract provisions include an hourly pay raise of 35 cents as well as improved severance protection.
- 2008
  - January to October: Workers at local Sudbury branches of the Canadian Imperial Bank of Commerce (CIBC) go on strike under United Steelworkers representation. After nine months, the workers win an immediate 4.5 percent wage increase, as well as a 3 percent wage increase built into an eighteen-month contract.
  - August: Full-time and part-time faculty at the University of Sudbury engage in a nine-day strike after the university administration attempted to negotiate individual contracts with faculty members instead of renewing their collective agreement.
  - September 19: Historic Sudbury Steelworkers Hall is destroyed by arson.
  - December: USW Local 2020 members at Sudbury Toronto-Dominion Bank (TD) branches vote to decertify from their union one year after a strike.
- 2009 - Strike at Vale by members of USW Local 6500 begins on July 13.

=== 2010s ===
- 2010
  - Graduate teaching assistants at Laurentian University vote to join the Canadian Union of Public Employees.
  - Vale strike ends on July 5, having lasted longer than the 1978 strike.
  - Unit 2 of the Ontario Public Service Employees Union (OPSEU) Local 677, representing office, technical, and administrative workers at the Northern Ontario School of Medicine, goes on strike on August 16. A tentative agreement is reached by November 2 and was ratified on November 7.
- 2011 - Support and administrative staff at Cambrian College (OPSEU Local 655) and Collège Boréal (OPSEU Local 672) participate in a province-wide strike at Ontario community colleges.
- 2015 - Workers (unionized with Unifor) at the Sudbury Downs are locked out by the track's owner, the Ontario Lottery and Gaming Corporation (OLG), over a pension dispute in September.

=== 2020s ===
- 2024
  - A month-long strike at the SNOLAB by 52 members of United Steelworkers Local 2020 ends on June 7 with ratification of a four-year collective agreement.

== See also ==
- Economy of Greater Sudbury
- Timeline of labour issues and events in Canada
