= Economy of Greater Sudbury =

Economy of Canadian region

The economy of Greater Sudbury, Ontario was dominated by the mining industry for much of the city's history. In recent decades, however, the city has diversified to establish itself as an emerging centre in a variety of industries, including finance, business, tourism, health care, education, government, film and television production, and science and technology research. Many of these industries reflect the city's position as a regional service centre for Northeastern Ontario.

The city's economy and politics have also been strongly influenced by a history of labour unionism.

== History ==
In 1856 the provincial land surveyor Albert Salter had located magnetic anomalies in the area that were strongly suggestive of mineral deposits, but his discovery aroused little attention because the area was remote and inaccessible. By the early 1880s, a small lumber camp, named Sainte-Anne-des-Pins ("St. Anne of the Pines") after a Jesuits mission concurrently established in the area, existed near what is now downtown Sudbury.

During construction of the Canadian Pacific Railway in 1883, blasting and excavation revealed high concentrations of nickel-copper ore at Murray Mine on the edge of the Sudbury Basin, bearing out Salter's earlier readings and leading to the establishment of a permanent settlement to serve as a transportation and commercial hub for the mining and lumber camps. James Worthington, the superintendent of construction on the Northern Ontario segment of the railway, selected the name Sudbury after Sudbury, Suffolk in England, which was the hometown of his wife Caroline. The community was incorporated as a town in 1893.

Sudbury's pentlandite, pyrite and pyrrhotite ores contain profitable amounts of many elements—primarily nickel and copper, but also including smaller amounts of cobalt, platinum, gold, silver, selenium and tellurium. The construction of the railway allowed exploitation of these mineral resources as well as large-scale lumber extraction.

Thomas Edison visited the Sudbury area as a prospector in 1901, and is credited with the original discovery of the ore body at Falconbridge.

The city experienced its first-ever labour strike in 1896, when workers building its new waterworks system struck for higher wages. This was one of several early public works crises in the city which contributed to the defeat of mayor Murray Biggar in the 1896 elections.

Mining began to replace lumber as the primary industry as improvements to the area's transportation network, including trams, made it possible for workers to live in one community and work in another. Two major mining companies were created, Inco in 1902 and Falconbridge in 1928. They became two of the city's major employers and two of the world's leading producers of nickel.

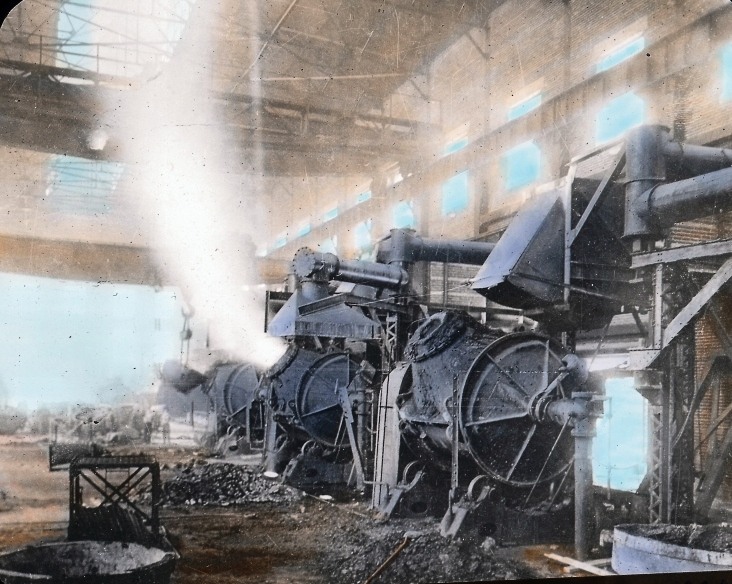
Copper converter in Sudbury, c. 1920

Through the decades that followed, Sudbury's economy went through boom and bust cycles as world demand for nickel fluctuated. Demand was high during the First World War when Sudbury-mined nickel was used extensively in the manufacturing of artillery in Sheffield, England. It bottomed out when the war ended and then rose again in the mid-1920s as peacetime uses for nickel began to develop. The town was reincorporated as a city in 1930. The city recovered from the Great Depression much more quickly than almost any other city in North America due to increased demand for nickel in the 1930s. Sudbury was the fastest-growing city and one of the wealthiest cities in Canada for most of the decade. Many of the city's social problems in the Great Depression era were not caused by unemployment, but due to the difficulty in keeping up with all of its new infrastructure demands created by rapid growth. Between 1936 and 1941, the city was ordered into receivership by the Ontario Municipal Board. Another economic slowdown affected the city in 1937, but the city's fortunes rose again during the Second World War; the Frood Mine alone accounted for 40 percent of all the nickel used in Allied artillery production during the war.

After the end of the war, Sudbury was in a good position to supply nickel to the United States government when it decided to stockpile non-Soviet supplies during the Cold War. By the 1970s, Inco employed a quarter of the local workforce.

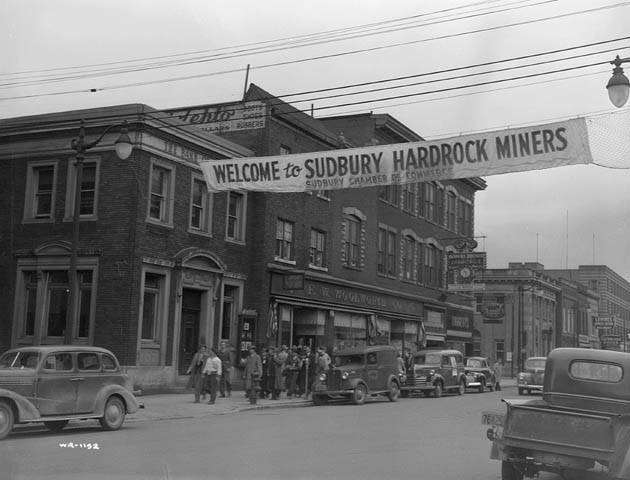
Banner welcoming wartime hardrock miners, c. October 5, 1942.

On April 21, 1944, the city's mine workers were unionized for the first time with the certification of the Mine, Mill and Smelter Workers Local 598. Inco and Falconbridge each set up their own puppet unions, the United Copper Nickel Workers Union at Inco and the Falconbridge Workers Council at Falconbridge, in an attempt to destabilize the Mine Mill, but the company efforts were largely rejected by workers—the United Copper Nickel Workers, in particular, became better known as "Nickel Rash". Robert Carlin, a prominent Mine Mill organizer, was elected to the Legislative Assembly of Ontario in 1943 as the city's first-ever Co-operative Commonwealth Federation representative, although he was later expelled by the party for not sufficiently denouncing the purported—and vastly overstated—prominence of Communists in the union.

In 1956, the Mine, Mill and Smelter Workers held their Canadian convention in Sudbury, which was noted for hosting the first concert given by Paul Robeson outside of the United States after the American government instituted its travel ban against him. Also that year, the city approved a natural gas contract with Northern Ontario Natural Gas— the city's mayor at the time, Leo Landreville, was later forced to resign from the Supreme Court of Ontario bench after allegations that he had received stock favours in exchange for the contract.

In the 1950s and 60s, Sudbury was beset by extensive labour unrest, experiencing its first mine workers' strike in 1958. Smaller strikes also took place in 1966 and 1969.

The United Steelworkers had also set their sights on raiding the Mine Mill locals, and there was often violence in the streets as the rival factions confronted each other—notably, a Mine Mill meeting at the Sudbury Arena, discussing whether to join the Steelworkers, erupted into a riot on September 10, 1961. Ultimately, the two unions settled into an uneasy truce, with Mine Mill winning the right to unionize Falconbridge, and the Steelworkers winning the right to unionize Inco. The national Mine Mill organization eventually merged into the Steelworkers in 1967—most of the Mine Mill locals remaining in Sudbury followed, although Local 598 voted against the merger and remained an independent autonomous local until becoming part of the Canadian Auto Workers in 1993.

In 1978, the workers of Sudbury's largest mining corporation, Inco (now Vale), embarked on a strike over production and employment cutbacks. The strike, which lasted for nine months, badly damaged Sudbury's economy; it was soon compounded by the recession of 1981-82, during which the city attained the dubious distinction of having the highest unemployment rate in all of North America.

These events spurred the city government to launch a project to diversify the city's economy; through an aggressive strategy, the city tried to attract new employers and industries through the 1980s and 1990s. The city's strategies were not always successful; one particularly noted boondoggle saw substantial municipal funding given to a failed angora goat farm on the closed Burwash Industrial Farm site.

During the post-recession era, Inco's increasing reliance on early retirement packages, rather than layoffs, for reducing its local workforce also significantly cushioned the impact of the staffing reductions on the city's economy.

In 2006, Inco and Falconbridge were taken over by foreign multinational corporations: Inco was acquired by the Brazilian company Vale, and Falconbridge was purchased by the Swiss company Xstrata. Vale now employs less than 5 per cent of the workforce. By 2006, 80% of Greater Sudbury's labour force was employed in services with 20% remaining in manufacturing.

On September 19, 2008, a fire destroyed the historic Sudbury Steelworkers Hall on Frood Road.

A strike at Vale's operations, which began on July 13, 2009, and saw a tentative resolution announced on July 5, 2010, lasted longer than the devastating 1978 strike, but had a much more modest effect on the city's economy than the earlier action—the local rate of unemployment declined slightly during the strike.

== Taxation ==
The city's economic growth has been hindered at times by taxation issues: because of federal corporate taxation rules pertaining to natural resources companies, Sudbury's ability to directly levy municipal taxes on Vale and Xstrata is severely curtailed, compared to most cities whose major employers operate in other industries. In 1954, the Sudbury Star referred to Sudbury as "a city without a city's birthright", because of this taxation barrier. Prior to the creation of the Regional Municipality of Sudbury in 1973, the city could not levy any taxes against the mining companies at all, because the Ontario Municipal Board consistently denied the city's requests to annex the outlying company towns, such as Copper Cliff, Coniston, Frood Mine or Falconbridge, where the mining facilities were actually located.

For much of its history, this fact left the city without a sufficient tax base to adequately maintain or improve municipal services. In 1945, mayor William S. Beaton noted at the annual convention of the Ontario Municipal Association that the city received just $214,320 in tax revenue from industrial business assessments, while the similarly sized city of Kitchener had an industrial tax base of almost $7 million. Even into the 1960s and 1970s, Sudbury offered the fewest municipal services of any city of comparable size in Ontario, despite having residential property tax rates fully 20 per cent higher than any of the same cities. For example, the city did not maintain a public transit system until 1972, instead relying on a succession of private operators, which were eventually consolidated under the ownership of Paul Desmarais, to provide bus services to commuters. The city only took over the system after a public outcry following an incident in which several students en route to classes at Laurentian University were hospitalized for carbon monoxide inhalation when their bus stalled and exhaust leaked into the vehicle.

In the 1950s, the provincial government began providing the city with an annual grant to make up the shortfall, although a municipal accounting study in 1956 found that this grant was only providing 52 per cent of the revenue the city would have received from a direct tax assessment on the mining facilities.

In 1973, the city and its suburban communities were reorganized into the Regional Municipality of Sudbury. The expansion of the city's boundaries gave the city the power to levy property taxes on Inco's surface operations in Copper Cliff and Frood, but not on their underground facilities. This change improved the city's tax base, but the ongoing discrepancy has still been cited as a factor in municipal politics during the 2006 municipal election. As of 2007, 75 per cent of the city's tax base comes from residential property taxes.

== Employment ==
The top employers in Sudbury as of November 2010 include:

Company / organization	Employees	Sector
Vale	4,000	Mining
Health Sciences North	3,700	Health services
Sudbury Tax Services Office	2,800	Federal government
City of Greater Sudbury	2,166	Municipal government
Laurentian University	1,850	Education
Rainbow District School Board	1,606	Education
Ontario Ministries and Agencies	1,500	Ontario government
Conseil scolaire de district catholique du Nouvel-Ontario	1,443	Education
Xstrata	1,139	Mining

== Retailing ==
Retail businesses in the city has moved outside of the downtown core in the late 20th century and the city has struggled to maintain a vibrant downtown. Projects aimed at revitalizing the downtown core included the creation of Market Square, a farmer's and craft market; the redevelopment of the Rainbow Centre Mall; streetscape beautification projects; and the creation of the Downtown Village Development Corporation, a not-for-profit organization dedicated to business attraction and downtown residential development. More recently, institutions such as the Franklin Carmichael Gallery and the Northern Ontario School of Architecture have chosen to locate downtown, in part to help spur new retail development due to increased tourist and pedestrian activity.

Despite these efforts, a considerable volume of the city's retail activity is still concentrated outside of the downtown core, particularly in areas such as the New Sudbury Centre, the Four Corners/South End and the RioCan and Silver Hills power centres on The Kingsway.

Until 2014, Sudbury was one of the few cities in Ontario where a municipal by-law prevented stores from opening on December 26, meaning that retail stores in the city began their post-Christmas Boxing Day sales on December 27. Some of the city's business owners alleged that this restriction caused a loss of business, as some shoppers in the region travelled to Barrie or Toronto to take advantage of the earlier shopping day. With labour unions being a prominent political force in the city, the issue of balancing the rights of retailers to set business hours against the rights of workers to holiday time at Christmas has been a persistent debate in Sudbury's municipal politics. In the 2010 municipal election, mayoral candidate Marianne Matichuk made a campaign pledge to deregulate store hours in the city, including allowing Boxing Day shopping; although she won election to the mayoralty, her motion to repeal the by-law failed when she presented it to city council in 2011. In early 2012, city councillor Ron Dupuis proposed putting the question to a voter referendum in the 2014 municipal election.

Although voters participating in the referendum strongly favoured deregulating store hours, voter turnout fell slightly short of the level needed to make the result legally binding. Council accepted the result as indicative of voter opinion, and repealed the existing store hours bylaw on December 9, 2014.

== Science and technology ==
Sudbury's economy is also influenced by science and technology sectors. The Creighton Mine site in Sudbury is home to the Sudbury Neutrino Observatory. Although the original experiments have now concluded, the underground laboratory has been enlarged and continues to operate other experiments at SNOLAB. It will be the world's deepest underground lab facility; the deeper Kolar Gold Fields experiments ended with the closing of the mine in 1992, and the planned DUSEL laboratory is not expected to begin construction before 2012. The SNO equipment has been refurbished for use in the SNO+ experiment.

Over 345 mining supply and service companies are located in Sudbury. This includes a number of public and private firms pursuing research and development in new mining technologies such as Mining Innovation Rehabilitation and Applied Research Corporation (MIRARCO), the Northern Centre for Advanced Technology (NORCAT), and the Centre for Excellence in Mining Innovation (CEMI).
