= Results of the 2023 Australian Indigenous Voice referendum =

2023 Australian Indigenous Voice referendum
- 14 October 2023
- A Proposed Law: To alter the Constitution to recognise the First Peoples of Australia by establishing an Aboriginal and Torres Strait Islander Voice. Do you approve this proposed alteration?
- Outcome: Not carried. A majority "no" vote nationally and in all states.
- Website: Official results

Results
Choice	Votes	%
Yes	6,286,894	39.94%
No	9,452,792	60.06%
Valid votes	15,739,686	99.02%
Invalid or blank votes	155,545	0.98%
Total votes	15,895,231	100.00%
Registered voters/turnout	17,671,784	89.95%
- Results by state or territory, and division

The 2023 Australian Indigenous Voice referendum was held on 14 October 2023. Voters were asked if they approved an alteration to the Australian Constitution that would recognise Indigenous Australians in the document through prescribing a body called the Aboriginal and Torres Strait Islander Voice. The referendum failed to get either of the two majorities in favour that were both required for the Constitution to be changed:

- more than half of the total national votes
- more than half of the votes in more than half of the states

== National ==
Australian Indigenous Voice referendum
Choice	Votes	%
For	6,286,894	39.94
Against	9,452,792	60.06
Total	15,739,686	100.00
Valid votes	15,739,686	99.02
Invalid/blank votes	155,545	0.98
Total votes	15,895,231	100.00
Registered voters/turnout	17,671,784	89.95
Source: Australian Electoral Commission

== States and territories ==
Votes cast in the territories are included in the national total for the purposes of determining a national majority, but the territories are not counted for the purposes of determining a majority of states.

Breakdown of voting by state and territory
State/territory	Yes		No		Informal votes	Turnout (%)
State/territory	Votes	%	Votes	%	Informal votes	Turnout (%)
New South Wales	2,058,764	41.04	2,957,880	58.96	57,285	90.80
Victoria	1,846,623	45.85	2,180,851	54.15	39,038	91.00
Queensland	1,010,416	31.79	2,167,957	68.21	27,266	88.25
Western Australia	582,077	36.73	1,002,740	63.27	13,454	87.50
South Australia	417,745	35.83	748,318	64.17	11,478	91.75
Tasmania	152,171	41.06	218,425	58.94	3,967	92.03
Northern Territory (Note: In accordance with the Referendum (Machinery Provisions) Act 1984, residents of the territory of Cocos (Keeling) Islands and the territory of Christmas Island are included in the Northern Territory for electoral purposes.)	43,076	39.70	65,429	60.30	820	71.45
Australian Capital Territory (Note: In accordance with the Referendum (Machinery Provisions) Act 1984, residents of the territories of Jervis Bay Territory and Norfolk Island are included in the Australian Capital Territory for electoral purposes.)	176,022	61.29	111,192	38.71	2,237	91.36
Total	6,286,894	39.94	9,452,792	60.06	155,545	89.92
Results	Obtained a majority in no state and an overall minority of 3,165,898 votes. Not carried.					

== Electoral divisions ==
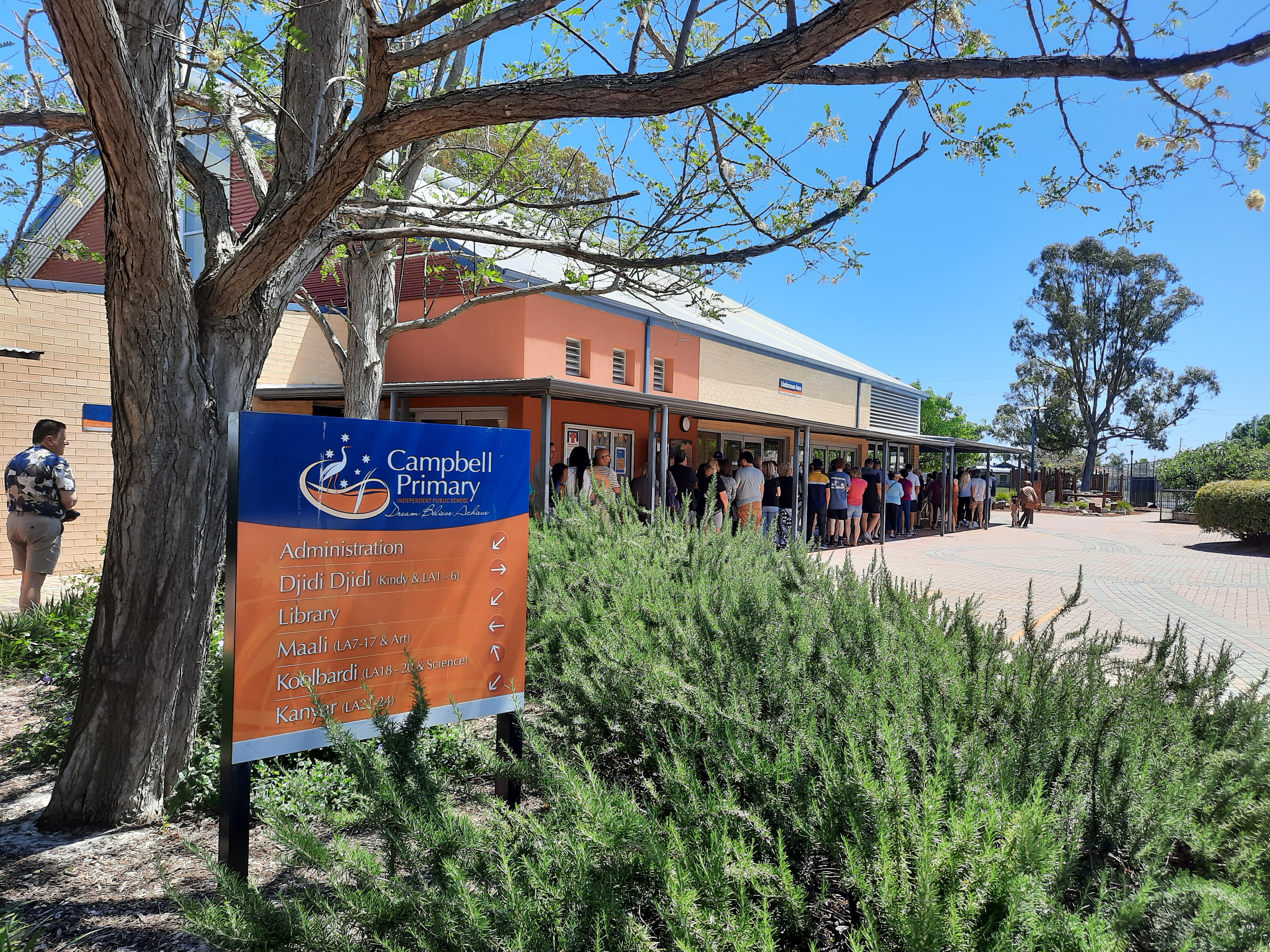
Voters lined up at a polling booth in Canning Vale, Perth.

Breakdown of voting by electorate
Electorate	Yes votes	Yes (%)	No votes	No (%)	Informal votes	Informal (%)	Total votes	Turnout (%)	Enrolment	Parliamentary seat held by	State
Adelaide	57,227	49.34	58,769	50.66	1,215	1.04	117,211	90.05	130,242	Labor	South Australia
Aston	43,201	42.08	59,473	57.92	1,080	1.04	103,754	93.14	111,346	Labor	Victoria
Ballarat	43,941	42.11	60,399	57.89	1,060	1.01	105,400	92.80	113,517	Labor	Victoria
Banks	38,228	38.95	59,925	61.05	1,357	1.36	99,510	91.41	108,813	Liberal	New South Wales
Barker	25,159	21.89	89,769	78.11	993	0.86	115,921	93.17	124,478	Liberal	South Australia
Barton	44,475	45.03	54,290	54.97	1,440	1.44	100,205	88.94	112,630	Labor	New South Wales
Bass	27,747	38.32	44,670	61.68	761	1.04	73,178	91.45	80,005	Liberal	Tasmania
Bean	56,937	56.34	44,131	43.66	886	0.87	101,954	91.71	111,159	Labor	Australian Capital Territory
Bendigo	42,726	40.53	62,684	59.47	1,004	0.94	106,414	93.41	113,858	Labor	Victoria
Bennelong	51,674	48.59	54,667	51.41	1,160	1.08	107,501	91.66	117,257	Labor	New South Wales
Berowra	46,602	46.67	53,260	53.33	870	0.86	100,732	93.95	107,204	Liberal	New South Wales
Blair	34,395	29.67	81,535	70.33	1,140	0.97	117,070	87.67	133,508	Labor	Queensland
Blaxland	34,476	38.25	55,648	61.75	2,376	2.57	92,500	83.86	110,298	Labor	New South Wales
Bonner	40,622	40.40	59,923	59.60	758	0.75	101,303	90.73	111,611	Liberal	Queensland
Boothby	56,966	47.98	61,756	52.02	1,153	0.96	119,875	93.64	128,093	Labor	South Australia
Bowman	30,282	28.14	77,314	71.86	883	0.81	108,479	90.93	119,263	Liberal	Queensland
Braddon	21,159	27.85	54,810	72.15	844	1.10	76,813	91.90	83,548	Liberal	Tasmania
Bradfield	52,255	52.11	48,025	47.89	899	0.89	101,179	92.34	109,572	Liberal	New South Wales
Brand	32,193	30.82	72,252	69.18	937	0.89	105,382	85.42	123,313	Labor	Western Australia
Brisbane	63,056	56.01	49,533	43.99	766	0.68	113,355	89.21	127,063	Greens	Queensland
Bruce	42,401	42.45	57,495	57.55	1,098	1.09	100,994	88.05	114,664	Labor	Victoria
Burt	32,786	33.42	65,326	66.58	863	0.87	98,975	84.30	117,372	Labor	Western Australia
Calare	32,524	28.79	80,465	71.21	1,091	0.96	114,080	92.68	123,035	Independent	New South Wales
Calwell	38,637	40.09	57,742	59.91	1,505	1.54	97,884	83.96	116,563	Labor	Victoria
Canberra	65,294	70.59	27,205	29.41	622	0.67	93,121	91.48	101,799	Labor	Australian Capital Territory
Canning	24,866	23.69	80,104	76.31	883	0.83	105,853	87.61	120,777	Liberal	Western Australia
Capricornia	19,202	19.30	80,280	80.70	666	0.67	100,148	88.93	112,597	Nationals	Queensland
Casey	45,674	42.37	62,122	57.63	1,114	1.02	108,910	93.85	116,010	Liberal	Victoria
Chifley	44,557	40.43	65,659	59.57	1,576	1.41	111,792	87.73	127,400	Labor	New South Wales
Chisholm	50,919	50.41	50,099	49.59	870	0.85	101,888	91.76	110,970	Labor	Victoria
Clark	39,204	58.12	28,251	41.88	658	0.97	68,113	91.59	74,366	Independent	Tasmania
Cook	37,660	36.74	64,834	63.26	1,072	1.04	103,566	92.54	111,879	Liberal	New South Wales
Cooper	66,053	65.78	34,369	34.22	978	0.96	101,400	90.62	111,841	Labor	Victoria
Corangamite	52,567	48.03	56,875	51.97	977	0.88	110,419	93.92	117,517	Labor	Victoria
Corio	47,666	45.98	56,009	54.02	1,044	1.00	104,719	91.56	114,309	Labor	Victoria
Cowan	39,995	37.51	66,628	62.49	1,201	1.11	107,824	86.67	124,354	Labor	Western Australia
Cowper	40,377	34.01	78,358	65.99	1,428	1.19	120,163	90.98	131,991	Nationals	New South Wales
Cunningham	55,620	51.86	51,624	48.14	1,210	1.12	108,454	91.58	118,357	Labor	New South Wales
Curtin	55,891	51.45	52,741	48.55	833	0.76	109,465	90.07	121,506	Independent	Western Australia
Dawson	19,921	19.98	79,797	80.02	738	0.73	100,456	88.15	113,930	Nationals	Queensland
Deakin	51,213	48.45	54,494	51.55	919	0.86	106,626	93.42	114,108	Liberal	Victoria
Dickson	36,517	34.58	69,083	65.42	834	0.78	106,434	91.78	115,957	Liberal	Queensland
Dobell	38,298	35.50	69,585	64.50	1,267	1.16	109,150	90.69	120,311	Labor	New South Wales
Dunkley	44,996	44.18	56,844	55.82	1,009	0.98	102,849	90.85	113,152	Labor	Victoria
Durack	27,946	27.89	72,269	72.11	718	0.71	100,933	81.25	124,228	Liberal	Western Australia
Eden-Monaro	43,323	39.77	65,615	60.23	1,076	0.98	110,014	93.69	117,366	Labor	New South Wales
Fadden	29,902	26.41	83,337	73.59	1,349	1.18	114,588	86.99	131,655	Liberal	Queensland
Fairfax	39,013	34.69	73,456	65.31	1,020	0.90	113,489	89.50	126,764	Liberal	Queensland
Farrer	27,747	25.00	83,242	75.00	1,011	0.90	112,000	91.69	122,085	Liberal	New South Wales
Fenner	53,791	57.44	39,856	42.56	729	0.77	94,376	90.87	103,856	Labor	Australian Capital Territory
Fisher	36,509	31.39	79,814	68.61	1,175	1.00	117,498	89.28	131,550	Liberal	Queensland
Flinders	44,984	42.65	60,499	57.35	1,037	0.97	106,520	92.50	115,098	Liberal	Victoria
Flynn	16,454	16.28	84,617	83.72	631	0.62	101,702	88.65	114,727	Nationals	Queensland
Forde	29,975	28.17	76,431	71.83	1,212	1.13	107,618	84.99	126,573	Liberal	Queensland
Forrest	32,331	31.00	71,974	69.00	973	0.92	105,278	89.64	117,412	Liberal	Western Australia
Fowler	38,684	39.82	58,466	60.18	1,743	1.76	98,893	87.73	112,695	DLFCN	New South Wales
Franklin	38,267	50.61	37,339	49.39	757	0.99	76,363	93.28	81,864	Labor	Tasmania
Fraser	56,054	57.04	42,226	42.96	1,037	1.04	99,317	87.48	113,489	Labor	Victoria
Fremantle	49,949	46.99	56,341	53.01	988	0.92	107,278	88.78	120,803	Labor	Western Australia
Gellibrand	52,917	52.51	47,852	47.49	910	0.89	101,679	89.33	113,775	Labor	Victoria
Gilmore	45,511	38.62	72,332	61.38	1,135	0.95	118,978	92.00	129,210	Labor	New South Wales
Gippsland	29,635	27.93	76,488	72.07	944	0.88	107,067	91.48	116,974	Nationals	Victoria
Goldstein	57,942	56.16	45,235	43.84	821	0.79	103,998	92.97	111,802	Independent	Victoria
Gorton	41,608	39.06	64,903	60.94	1,187	1.10	107,698	89.88	119,814	Labor	Victoria
Grayndler	75,538	74.64	25,659	25.36	802	0.79	101,999	91.55	111,385	Labor	New South Wales
Greenway	48,771	42.99	64,671	57.01	1,207	1.05	114,649	90.68	126,392	Labor	New South Wales
Grey	23,377	20.56	90,305	79.44	940	0.82	114,622	90.61	126,508	Liberal	South Australia
Griffith	61,128	56.02	47,994	43.98	962	0.87	110,084	89.12	123,514	Greens	Queensland
Groom	24,894	23.68	80,253	76.32	711	0.67	105,858	91.26	115,961	Liberal	Queensland
Hasluck	37,676	34.85	70,419	65.15	856	0.79	108,951	88.01	123,768	Labor	Western Australia
Hawke	35,481	35.68	63,973	64.32	1,030	1.03	100,484	89.74	111,942	Labor	Victoria
Herbert	24,921	24.31	77,586	75.69	741	0.72	103,248	86.27	119,667	Liberal	Queensland
Higgins	60,789	61.14	38,634	38.86	749	0.75	100,172	91.01	110,036	Labor	Victoria
Hindmarsh	45,307	38.44	72,565	61.56	1,276	1.07	119,148	91.85	129,776	Labor	South Australia
Hinkler	21,535	19.57	88,488	80.43	762	0.69	110,785	89.99	123,073	Nationals	Queensland
Holt	43,179	42.98	57,283	57.02	1,008	0.99	101,470	88.73	114,326	Labor	Victoria
Hotham	51,982	49.80	52,394	50.20	1,171	1.11	105,547	89.44	117,958	Labor	Victoria
Hughes	42,133	41.47	59,467	58.53	943	0.92	102,543	94.41	108,588	Liberal	New South Wales
Hume	30,982	26.56	85,687	73.44	1,004	0.85	117,673	93.19	126,213	Liberal	New South Wales
Hunter	34,961	29.09	85,209	70.91	1,262	1.04	121,432	91.75	132,245	Labor	New South Wales
Indi	36,289	33.11	73,315	66.89	963	0.87	110,567	92.57	119,391	Independent	Victoria
Isaacs	52,454	50.57	51,274	49.43	1,080	1.03	104,808	92.18	113,627	Labor	Victoria
Jagajaga	58,070	54.64	48,210	45.36	1,024	0.95	107,304	93.55	114,687	Labor	Victoria
Kennedy	20,697	20.33	81,090	79.67	669	0.65	102,456	84.33	121,512	KAP	Queensland
Kingsford Smith	56,387	55.64	44,961	44.36	1,082	1.06	102,430	88.42	115,814	Labor	New South Wales
Kingston	40,585	35.71	73,060	64.29	1,219	1.06	114,864	91.19	126,033	Labor	South Australia
Kooyong	63,253	59.85	42,433	40.15	739	0.69	106,425	93.21	114,138	Independent	Victoria
La Trobe	39,916	38.49	63,787	61.51	912	0.87	104,615	91.11	114,777	Liberal	Victoria
Lalor	48,124	46.89	54,508	53.11	1,010	0.97	103,642	88.05	117,660	Labor	Victoria
Leichhardt	34,179	34.45	65,044	65.55	827	0.83	100,050	81.81	122,282	Liberal	Queensland
Lilley	48,455	46.56	55,606	53.44	854	0.81	104,915	90.51	115,874	Labor	Queensland
Lindsay	35,490	31.01	78,974	68.99	1,336	1.15	115,800	90.26	128,248	Liberal	New South Wales
Lingiari	22,274	43.54	28,885	56.46	385	0.75	51,544	64.38	80,055	Labor	Northern Territory
Longman	29,361	24.66	89,691	75.34	1,099	0.91	120,151	88.51	135,691	Liberal	Queensland
Lyne	31,017	26.49	86,075	73.51	1,055	0.89	118,147	92.96	126,981	Nationals	New South Wales
Lyons	25,794	32.59	53,355	67.41	947	1.18	80,096	91.88	87,156	Labor	Tasmania
Macarthur	43,619	34.89	81,415	65.11	1,607	1.27	126,641	89.80	140,973	Labor	New South Wales
Mackellar	52,299	50.84	50,562	49.16	1,049	1.01	103,910	92.30	112,551	Independent	New South Wales
Macnamara	63,584	64.61	34,833	35.39	859	0.87	99,276	87.38	113,597	Labor	Victoria
Macquarie	43,814	43.44	57,058	56.56	1,004	0.99	101,876	93.32	109,103	Labor	New South Wales
Makin	35,883	32.12	75,834	67.88	1,147	1.02	112,864	91.59	123,305	Labor	South Australia
Mallee	23,901	21.69	86,273	78.31	836	0.75	111,010	91.20	121,621	Nationals	Victoria
Maranoa	15,594	15.38	85,768	84.62	563	0.55	101,925	89.90	113,363	Nationals	Queensland
Maribyrnong	51,674	51.29	49,070	48.71	1,009	0.99	101,753	91.51	111,154	Labor	Victoria
Mayo	49,995	40.17	74,450	59.83	1,217	0.97	125,662	94.54	133,078	Centre Alliance	South Australia
McEwen	42,268	39.91	63,639	60.09	941	0.88	106,848	92.68	115,285	Labor	Victoria
McMahon	33,029	34.11	63,796	65.89	1,728	1.75	98,553	88.31	111,566	Labor	New South Wales
McPherson	35,801	35.08	66,246	64.92	1,265	1.22	103,312	86.93	118,805	Liberal	Queensland
Melbourne	77,741	77.21	22,949	22.79	698	0.69	101,388	87.27	116,172	Greens	Victoria
Menzies	46,820	45.14	56,891	54.86	1,002	0.96	104,713	92.52	113,112	Liberal	Victoria
Mitchell	47,917	40.67	69,897	59.33	983	0.83	118,797	92.80	127,985	Liberal	New South Wales
Monash	35,884	34.34	68,625	65.66	1,016	0.96	105,525	92.58	113,948	Liberal	Victoria
Moncrieff	32,038	30.80	71,967	69.20	1,139	1.08	105,144	84.67	124,154	Liberal	Queensland
Moore	41,463	37.74	68,413	62.26	880	0.79	110,756	91.50	121,017	Liberal	Western Australia
Moreton	46,961	49.32	48,263	50.68	971	1.01	96,195	88.36	108,852	Labor	Queensland
New England	26,158	24.68	79,846	75.32	911	0.85	106,915	92.12	115,992	Nationals	New South Wales
Newcastle	60,204	53.53	52,260	46.47	1,199	1.05	113,663	91.87	123,663	Labor	New South Wales
Nicholls	25,806	24.76	78,437	75.24	920	0.87	105,163	91.19	115,255	Nationals	Victoria
North Sydney	61,692	59.93	41,254	40.07	851	0.82	103,797	91.74	113,165	Independent	New South Wales
O'Connor	25,937	24.48	80,005	75.52	785	0.74	106,727	87.92	121,388	Liberal	Western Australia
Oxley	41,016	40.25	60,899	59.75	1,046	1.02	102,961	87.20	118,041	Labor	Queensland
Page	37,443	33.02	75,936	66.98	1,230	1.07	114,609	92.25	124,181	Nationals	New South Wales
Parkes	20,859	21.16	77,723	78.84	994	1.00	99,576	89.72	110,934	Nationals	New South Wales
Parramatta	42,734	45.36	51,476	54.64	1,212	1.27	95,422	87.25	109,334	Labor	New South Wales
Paterson	37,243	30.00	86,891	70.00	1,333	1.06	125,467	92.30	135,828	Labor	New South Wales
Pearce	32,408	31.31	71,111	68.69	894	0.86	104,413	86.83	120,227	Labor	Western Australia
Perth	57,950	53.68	50,005	46.32	995	0.91	108,950	87.97	123,816	Labor	Western Australia
Petrie	37,828	33.17	76,214	66.83	934	0.81	114,976	88.82	129,394	Liberal	Queensland
Rankin	32,835	35.26	60,288	64.74	1,050	1.11	94,173	83.78	112,395	Labor	Queensland
Reid	52,659	50.62	51,375	49.38	1,026	0.98	105,060	90.05	116,651	Labor	New South Wales
Richmond	48,067	43.93	61,348	56.07	1,491	1.34	110,906	89.74	123,537	Labor	New South Wales
Riverina	26,810	24.92	80,772	75.08	1,029	0.95	108,611	92.26	117,673	Nationals	New South Wales
Robertson	44,579	43.37	58,197	56.63	1,102	1.06	103,878	91.62	113,332	Labor	New South Wales
Ryan	54,466	52.71	48,875	47.29	677	0.65	104,018	92.02	113,005	Greens	Queensland
Scullin	37,486	38.10	60,896	61.90	1,343	1.35	99,725	89.23	111,735	Labor	Victoria
Shortland	41,463	38.39	66,551	61.61	1,212	1.11	109,226	92.84	117,568	Labor	New South Wales
Solomon	20,802	36.27	36,544	63.73	435	0.75	57,781	79.22	72,936	Labor	Northern Territory
Spence	32,303	27.77	84,000	72.23	1,239	1.05	117,542	88.29	133,226	Labor	South Australia
Sturt	50,943	42.90	67,810	57.10	1,079	0.90	119,832	92.66	129,401	Liberal	South Australia
Swan	44,813	42.75	60,009	57.25	828	0.78	105,650	86.06	122,724	Labor	Western Australia
Sydney	73,333	70.90	30,100	29.10	889	0.85	104,322	85.38	122,228	Labor	New South Wales
Tangney	45,873	41.32	65,143	58.68	820	0.73	111,836	90.65	123,326	Labor	Western Australia
Wannon	35,015	32.39	73,102	67.61	1,010	0.93	109,127	93.39	116,788	Liberal	Victoria
Warringah	57,347	59.54	38,967	40.46	836	0.86	97,150	90.99	106,766	Independent	New South Wales
Watson	39,490	42.05	54,414	57.95	2,043	2.13	95,947	86.44	110,964	Labor	New South Wales
Wentworth	56,732	62.55	33,973	37.45	840	0.92	91,545	87.64	104,435	Independent	New South Wales
Werriwa	41,941	36.77	72,107	63.23	1,915	1.65	115,963	87.12	133,060	Labor	New South Wales
Whitlam	42,042	35.84	75,264	64.16	1,399	1.18	118,705	92.22	128,629	Labor	New South Wales
Wide Bay	26,679	25.19	79,237	74.81	865	0.81	106,781	89.12	119,799	Nationals	Queensland
Wills	63,773	64.88	34,517	35.12	1,124	1.13	99,414	89.41	111,159	Labor	Victoria
Wright	26,180	22.67	89,328	77.33	959	0.82	116,467	88.88	131,027	Liberal	Queensland

== Analysis ==
The referendum result saw a majority of Australians in every jurisdiction other than the ACT vote No to the Voice.

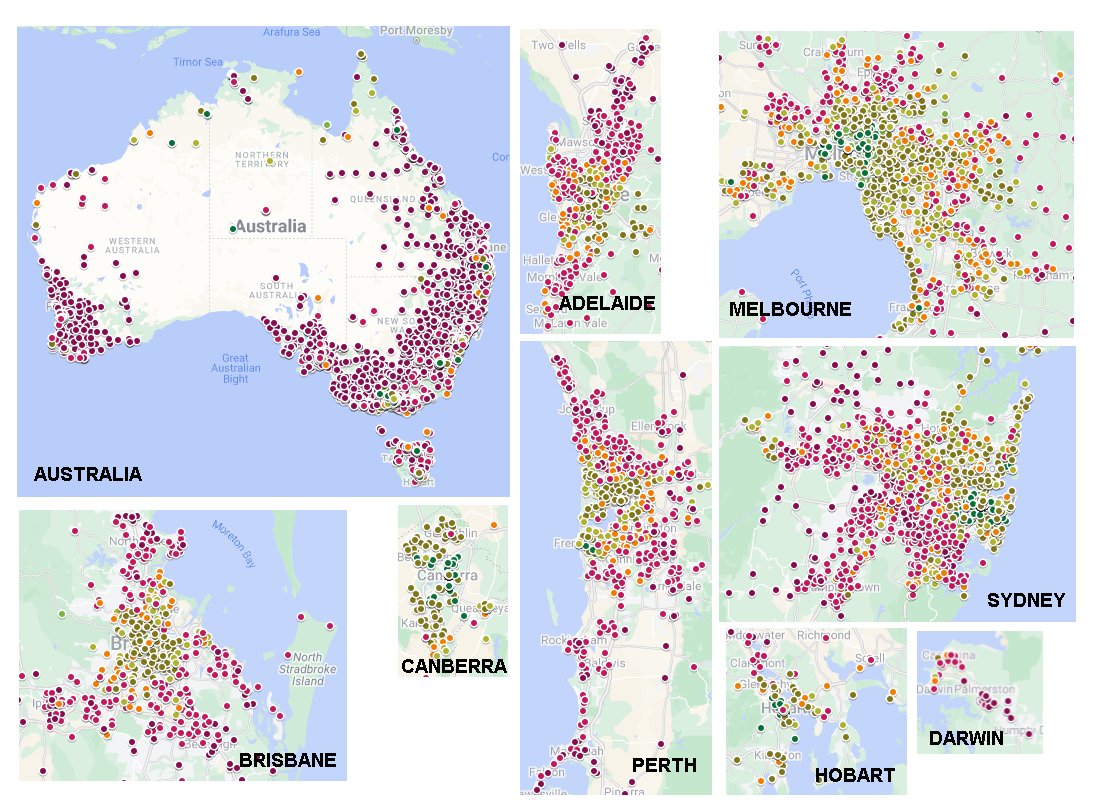
Results of the 2023 Australian Indigenous Voice Referendum by polling place

=== Demographics ===
Although every electorate with a high Indigenous population voted No, many Indigenous communities in these seats voted Yes. However, turnout in Indigenous communities is low, and in many of them less than a third of enrolled voters actually voted.

A study from the Australian National University found that No voters were typically older than Yes voters, and that men were more likely to vote No than women. The study also found that the majority of people who speak English as a second language voted No. Ethnic communities were, throughout the campaign, a key demographic for both the Yes and No camps.

The vote for the Voice in suburbs with high ethnic populations was split, with election analyst Ben Raue identifying some surprising trends in certain suburbs. For example, of the 15 suburbs with the highest Indian populations, 10 of them voted Yes, despite all but one being located in electorates that voted No. On the other hand, of the 15 suburbs with the highest Chinese populations, only three voted Yes (though all but one had an above-average Yes vote).

=== Geography ===
The result saw an urban-rural political divide, with regional and rural areas voting heavily against the Voice while inner-city seats voted Yes. Seats in the outer suburbs and based around major regional cities typically voted No, but not to the same extent as rural areas.

Every seat in South Australia and the Northern Territory voted No to the Voice, as did all but three seats in Queensland and all but two seats in both Western Australia and Tasmania. Of the seats that voted Yes, almost all of them were inner-city seats in the capital cities, and only two seats in regional cities voted Yes (those being Cunningham and Newcastle, located in the cities of Wollongong and Newcastle, respectively). In contrast, of the 34 electorates with a No vote of over 70%, only four were in the capital cities (Bowman, Forde and Longman in Brisbane and Spence in Adelaide).

=== Income ===
The result saw a divide between the upper-class and the middle and lower-classes, with affluent suburbs in inner-city electorates voting Yes. The Voice had long been criticised by its opponents as a progressive and elitist proposal, having been backed by large and influential corporations and donors while being perceived as having a lack of support from ordinary Australians.

=== Politics ===
Although Labor backed the proposal and the Coalition opposed it (though one state division of the Liberal Party, the Tasmanian Liberal Party, supported it), the majority of Labor electorates voted No, though the No vote was higher in most Coalition seats.

The Greens and teal independents also backed the Voice. Every electorate held by the Greens or a teal independent voted Yes. The Greens and teal independents hold seats in affluent inner-city electorates in Sydney, Melbourne, Brisbane and Perth.
