= 2009–2010 Vale Inco strike =

Nickel mining labour dispute in Ontario

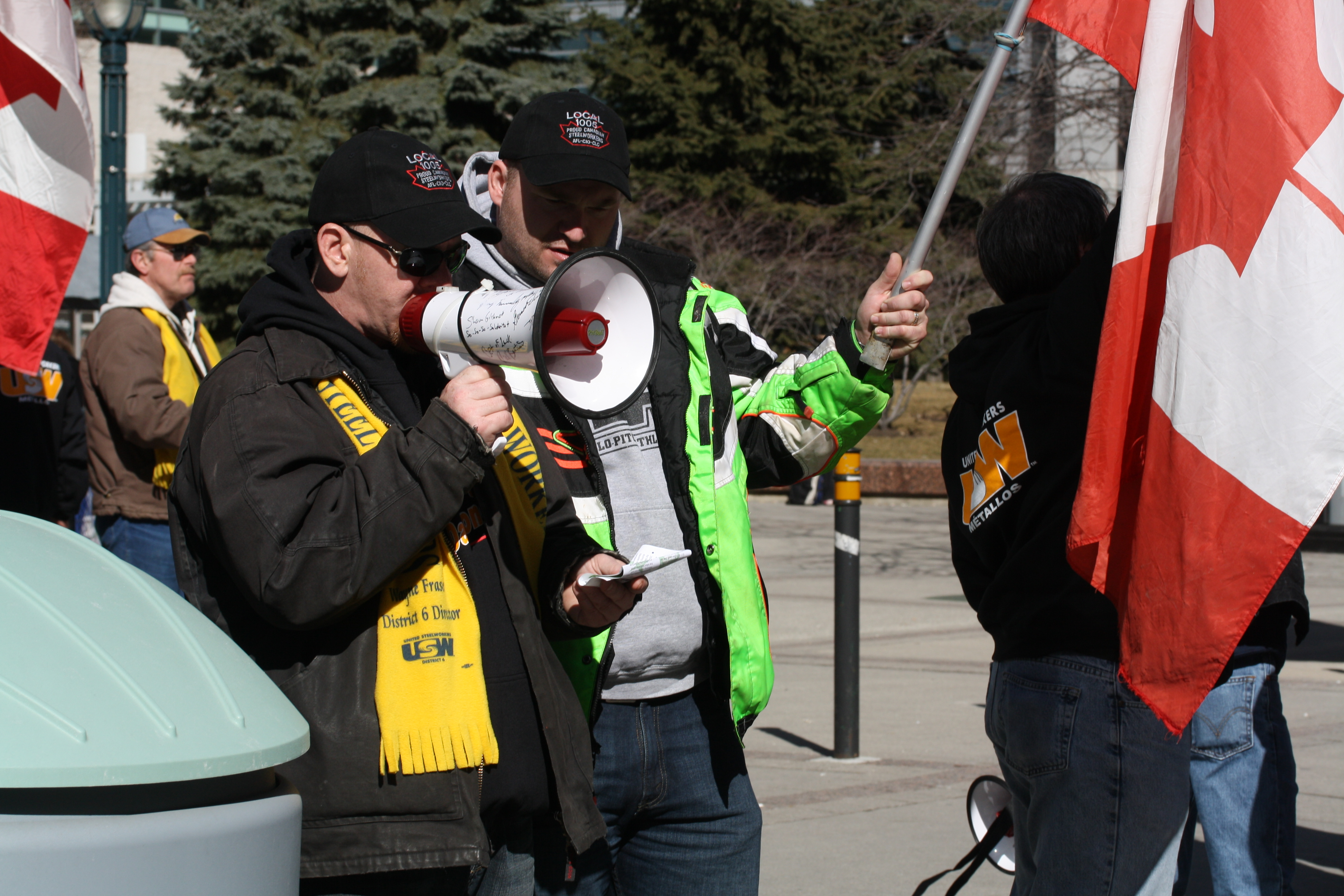
- Date: July 13, 2009–July 8, 2010
- Location: Ontario
- Methods: Strike action
- Concessions: $2.46 cumulative hourly wage increase and up to $4000 in back-to-work bonuses

Parties
| Vale Canada (initially Inco Ltd.) | United Steel Workers |

2009–2010 Vale Inco strike was a labour dispute in Port Colborne and Sudbury, Ontario which lasted from July 13, 2009 to July 8, 2010. Striking workers were part of United Steel Workers Local 6500. It was the longest strike in Canadian history at the time, surpassing the 1978 Inco strike.

The strike ended after 75% of the workers voted to ratify a new contract that would earn them a $2.46 cumulative hourly wage increase over the following four years and up to $4000 in back-to-work bonuses. The strike included multiple lawsuits which parties agreed to drop after the strike concluded.

== Background ==
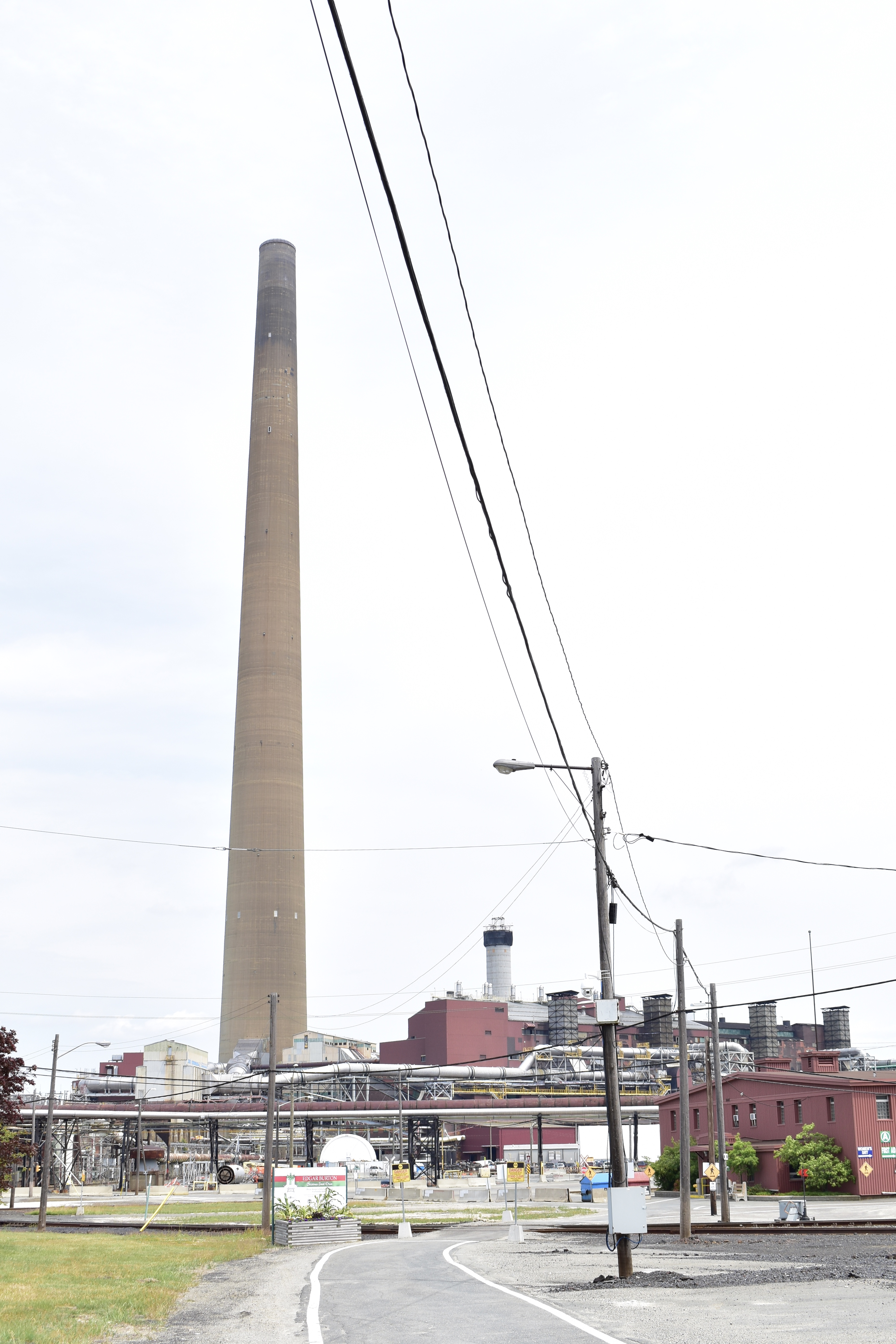
One of Vale Canada's operations in Sudbury, Ontario

Vale S.A. is a large mining company based in Brazil, employing over 100,000 people internationally with Canadian nickel mining operations supplying over 10% of the world's nickel. Before 2006, the Canadian operations were run by Inco Ltd. which was subsequently purchased by Vale. The name Inco was dropped during the 2009–2010 strike in favour of Vale Canada. Vale's portfolio of Canadian operations includes six nickel mines in Sudbury.

== Strike ==
Vale workers went on strike on 13 July 2009. Tensions were high during the strike with the union accusing Vale of bargaining in bad faith, and Vale suing the union over incidents the company alleged occurred on the picket line. During the strike, Vale used its office, clerical and technical employees who were not striking with the union as strikebreakers in order to resume operations. The resumed operations continued to significantly under-perform prior years.

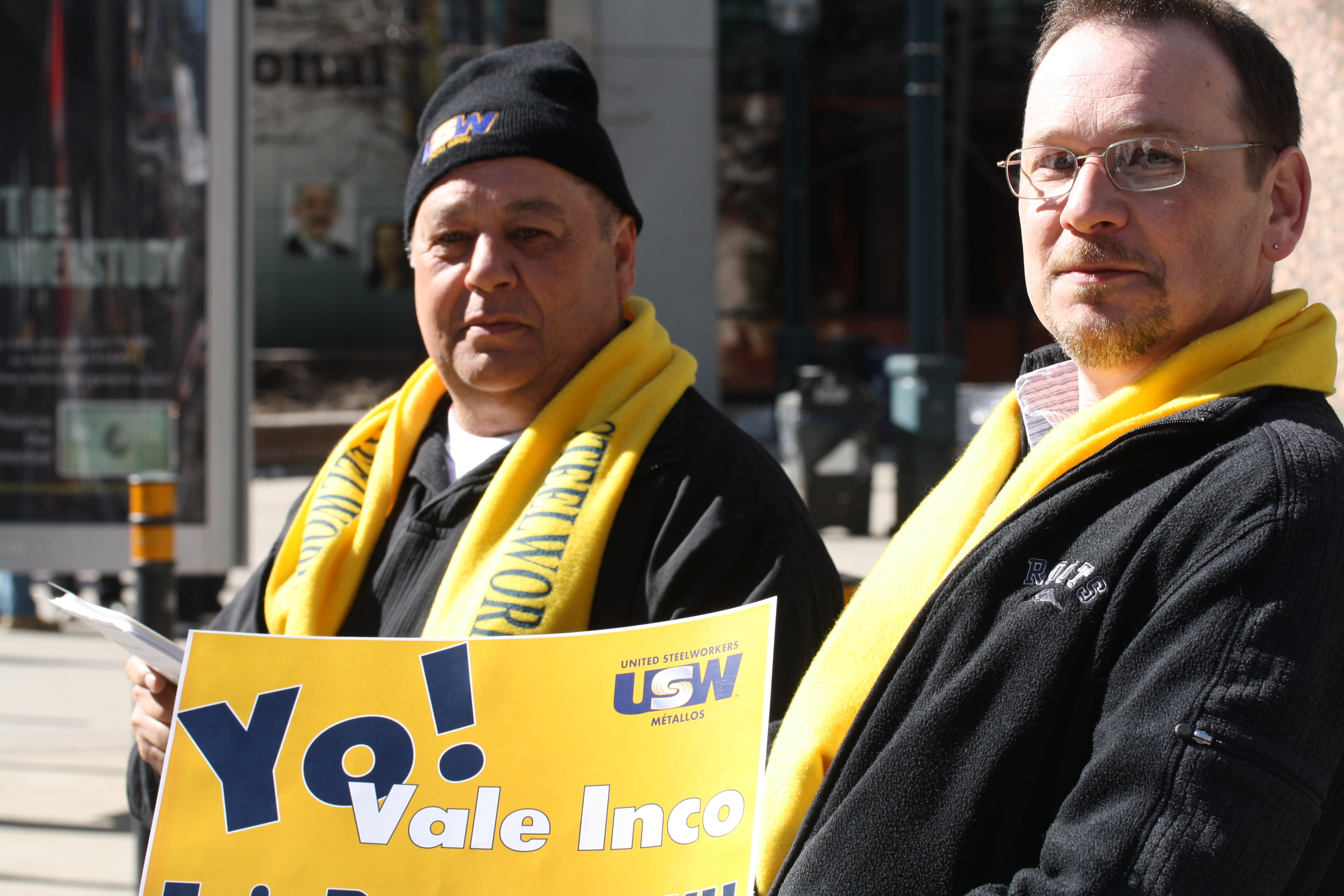
Two USW workers picketing on 7 March 2010

During the negotiations, Vale argued that cutting labour costs was necessary in order for the company to remain competitive in the industry. Workers argued in-turn that the company has billions of dollars in yearly revenue, and as such, did not necessarily need concessions from workers.

=== Outcome ===
The strike was concluded on 8 July 2010 after 75% of the striking workers voted to approve a new contract. The workers intended to return to work within six weeks following the contract's ratification. The 2009–2010 Vale Inco strike was the longest strike in the history of Inco's operations, surpassing the 1978–1979 Inco strike which had lasted only nine months. The 2009–2010 strike lasted about a year.

Among the company's concessions in the new contract were a large back-to-work bonus and incremental raises. Workers would each receive a $2000 bonus for ratifying the contract, and the company offered an additional $2000 bonus if the mines' capacity returned to 95% of their full capacity for 42 days within six months of the contract's ratification. Additionally, workers would receive a cumulative $2.46 hourly raise by 2014. The new agreement also included a provision for all lawsuits initiated during the strike to be dropped.

The new contract would move workers from a defined-benefit pension plan to a defined-contribution plan. Whereas their defined-benefit plan guaranteed steady income in retirement, the new defined-contribution plan would be affected by market returns. In exchange, workers who were employed by Vale at the time of the ratification would receive a boosted post-retirement income and an improved long-term disability plan.

== Response ==
At the time, the strike raised questions about the responsibilities of foreign companies purchasing Canadian assets.

== See also ==
- Timeline of labour in Greater Sudbury
- Economy of Greater Sudbury
