= Voutilainen =

Voutilainen is a Finnish surname.

== Geographical distribution ==
As of 2014, 94.7% of all known bearers of the surname Voutilainen were residents of Finland (frequency 1:1,292), 1.8% of Sweden (1:123,084) and 1.7% of Australia (1:304,793).

In Finland, the frequency of the surname was higher than national average (1:1,292) in the following regions:

1. Northern Savonia (1:220)
2. North Karelia (1:321)
3. Southern Savonia (1:1,076)
4. South Karelia (1:1,158)

== People ==
- Janne Voutilainen, Canadian trade unionist. See Rosvall and Voutilainen
- Jukka Voutilainen, Finnish ice hockey player
- Laura Voutilainen, Finnish singer
- Kari Voutilainen, Switzerland-based watchmaker
