= Lumber Workers Industrial Union of Canada =

LWUIC
- Lumber Workers' Industrial Union of Canada
- Founded: 1924
- Dissolved: 1935
- Location: Canada
- Key people: A. T. Hill, J. Gillhead, Alfred Hautamäki and Kalle Salo.
- Affiliations: Workers' Party of Canada, Communist Party of Canada

The Lumber Workers Industrial Union of Canada was a trade union of lumberjacks in Canada. LWIUC was founded in Sault Ste. Marie 1924 by Finnish communists, who were dissatisfied with the Lumber Workers Industrial Union of the Industrial Workers of the World and the OBU. The two founding national secretaries of LWIUC were Alfred Hautamäki and Kalle Salo, both Finns. A prominent figure in the founding of LWIUC was A. T. Hill, a former wobblie and the leader of the Finnish section of the Communist Party of Canada. Overall, LWIUC maintained strong links with the Communist Party. Through the halls run by the Finnish Organization of Canada (an organization that was collectively affiliated with the Workers' Party of Canada, the legal front of the Communist Party), LWIUC rapidly gained thousands of members. The headquarters of the LWIUC were initially at Port Arthur.

== Metsätyöläinen ==
LWIUC began publishing the monthly magazine Metsätyöläinen ('The Forest Worker') in December 1925, and it became an important mouthpiece of the Finnish-Canadian leftwing. The magazine was edited by Hautamäki. Metsätyöläinen was published by the Vapaus printing press until 1935.

== Organizational strengthening ==
During the latter part of the 1920s LWIUC managed to establish itself as the dominant lumber workers union in Ontario. LWIUC undertook a militant mobilization campaign in north-eastern Ontario in 1927, an effort that enabled LWIUC to gain a strong presence at the White and Plaunt operations along the CNR line north of Sudbury. It also began to accept agricultural workers into its fold. By 1928, LWIUC had established branches in South Porcupine, Porcupine, Timmins, Connaught and several seasonal logging camps.

== Rosvall and Voutilainen ==
In 1929 LWIUC sent out two organizers, Viljo Rosvall and John Voutilainen to Onion Lake to mobilize union activity amongst workers at the Pigeon Timber Company. The company was managed by the subcontractor Pappi ('Reverend') Leonard Mäki, who opposed union organizing and had a conscious policy of mainly recruiting White Finns. Rosvall and Voutilainen never returned, and in April the following year their bodies were recovered. Official reports stated that the men had died of drowning, but the LWIUC claimed that they had been murdered. Around 4,000 people participated in the funeral of Rosvall and Voutilainen in Port Arthur.

== WUL period ==
In 1930, LWIUC joined the Workers' Unity League. The office of LWIUC was situated in Sudbury for a while. With the formation of WUL, the influence of the Communist Party over LWIUC became stronger. Within WUL Hautamäki's leadership was questioned, and the union was criticized for not launching strikes. However, successful strike actions were almost impossible to organize in northern Ontario until the logging industry had recovered in around 1933. At this point, LWIUC began a new wave of strikes and mobilizations. Now the union sought to recruit non-Finns into its fold, for which an English-language publication was launched (The Lumber Worker) and a J. Gillbanks, an Anglophone communist from Lakehead, was delegated to assist the union in organizing non-Finns. Through these efforts the membership of LWIUC was broadened significantly, gaining a strong presence amongst Swedes, Slavs, English- and French-speaking Canadians and other groups. In 1934 the LWIUC office was moved to Timmins, with W. Delaney as its new president.

== Disbanding ==
In 1935, LWIUC was disbanded. This followed a shift in policy in the Communist International. The communists now abandoned the idea of forming militant trade unions, and began to work within the established mainstream unions. The workers previously organized by LWIUC joined the Lumber and Sawmill Workers' Union (a union affiliated to the American Federation of Labor).
