= Urban–rural political divide =

Phenomenon in political science

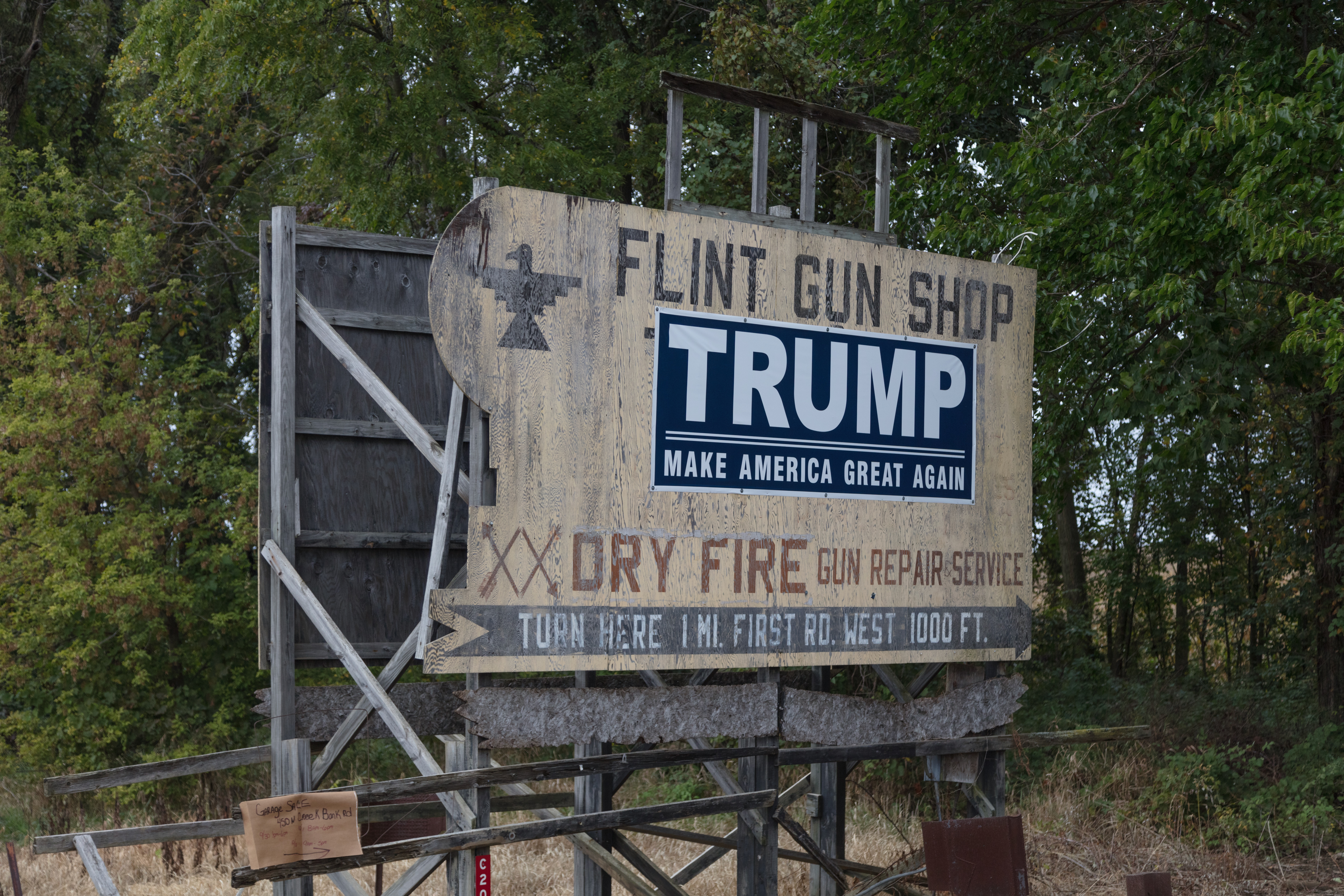
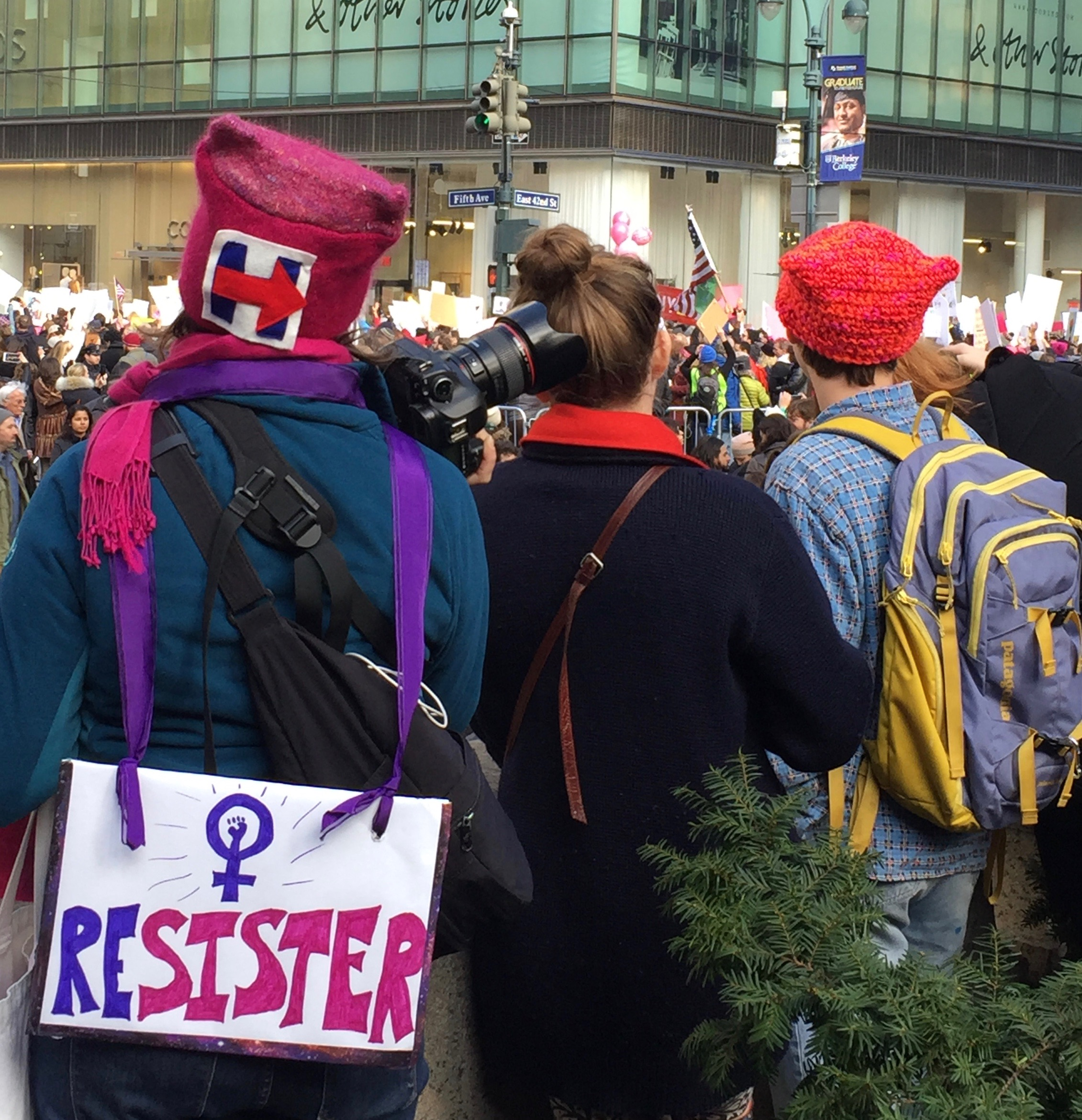
Top to bottom:
A Donald Trump campaign sign on a business billboard for Flint Gun Shop in Steuben County, Indiana; 2017 Women's March attendees in Brooklyn, New York

In political science, the urban–rural political divide is a phenomenon in which predominantly urban areas and predominantly rural areas within a country have sharply diverging political views. It is a form of political polarization. Typically, urban areas exhibit more liberal, left-wing, secular, progressive, cosmopolitan, and/or multiculturalist political attitudes, while rural areas exhibit more conservative, right-wing, religious, and/or nationalist/populist political attitudes, though India is a notable exception where the reverse happens. (Note: In India the urban voters tend to vote more for right wing parties than Rural voters. For instance in 2024 Indian general election, the BJP won 40% of the votes in urban areas as compared to just 34% in rural areas.)

An urban–rural political divide has been observed worldwide in many nations including Australia, Belgium, Canada, France, Hungary, India, Italy, Japan, Malaysia, Korea, the Netherlands, Poland, Taiwan, Thailand, Turkey, the United Kingdom, and the United States. Political divisions between urban and rural areas have been noted by political scientists and journalists to have intensified in the 21st century, and in particular since the Great Recession. In Europe, the increasing urban–rural polarisation has coincided with the decline of centre-left parties and concomitant rise of far-right and populist parties, a trend known as Pasokification.

== History ==
=== Asia ===
In Asia, the urban–rural political divide has been observed in China, India, Malaysia, Thailand, and Turkey.

==== China ====
The urban–rural conflict in China has been a complicated and long-standing problem, which results from the economic, social, and cultural disparities between these two areas. One of the major reasons for this conflict is the unequal distribution of wealth and resources between urban and rural regions, where urban areas experience rapid growth in population and wealth, while rural areas lose millions of migrants to the city. The rural economy lags behind, leading to a shortage of basic infrastructure such as water, electricity, and transportation. Additionally, rural–urban migration is another contributing factor that causes overcrowding, housing shortages, and increased job competition in urban areas. Furthermore, cultural and social differences between urban and rural communities can also lead to misunderstandings and conflicts. Having recognized the problem, the Chinese government has implemented several policies, such as promoting rural development, improving rural infrastructure, and increasing access to education and healthcare, to address the issue.

==== India ====
The Bharatiya Janata Party-led National Democratic Alliance (NDA) maintains strong hold over highly urbanized capital regions, while the opposition INDIA alliance has support in predominantly rural and agrarian constituencies. India operates under a robust multi-party system dominated at the federal level by two primary political alliances: the right-wing, Hindu nationalist National Democratic Alliance (NDA) led by the Bharatiya Janata Party (BJP), and the centre-left, secular Indian National Developmental Inclusive Alliance (INDIA) led by the Indian National Congress (INC). While regional dynamics often dictate state-level assembly elections, a profound political divide between urban metropolitan centres and rural agrarian areas heavily influences national parliamentary outcomes. This geographic and structural friction shapes the distribution of the 543 seats in the Lok Sabha (the lower house of India's Parliament).There is an established pattern of political polarization where urban constituencies lean conservative and pro-business, while rural constituencies remain competitive battlegrounds driven by agrarian welfare economics. During the 2024 general elections, this spatial cleavage became highly pronounced. In purely urban electorates, the BJP-led NDA maintained clear dominance, leveraging its appeal among middle-class professionals, tech-corridor workers, and commercial hubs. Conversely, the opposition INDIA alliance experienced a massive resurgence across the country's rural farmlands, tapping into mounting distress surrounding inflation, stagnant agricultural wages, and underemployment.

The starkest manifestation of this urban–rural split can be seen in direct seat tallies across different municipal boundaries. Of the 55 seats classified as purely urban, the NDA captured a lopsided 39 seats compared to the INDIA alliance's 15 seats. However, across the 488 constituencies classified as predominantly rural, the gap dramatically narrowed; the NDA won 254 seats while the INDIA alliance captured 219 seats, showcasing intense rural resistance against the ruling national party. This structural divergence highlights a clear baseline: while the opposition blocks momentum when hitting major metropolitan tiers, the ruling party loses its absolute single-party dominance once campaigns cross into the rural interior. Diverging voter priorities heavily fuel this ongoing geographic bifurcation. Middle-class urban voters consistently prioritize national security, infrastructure modernization, digital governance platforms, and macroeconomic growth indicators. In contrast, voting behavior in rural villages revolves fundamentally around localized survival metrics. These include minimum support prices (MSP) for crops, fertilizer subsidies, guaranteed public sector employment schemes like MGNREGA, and access to direct-benefit cash transfers or clean drinking water. While the urban electorate rewards global economic branding, the rural majority acts as a balancing mechanism, voting strictly on immediate agricultural realities and localized social caste dynamics.

=== Europe ===
The urban–rural divide has been analyzed in Europe, particularly Western Europe. Cited countries include Belgium, France, Hungary, Italy, the Netherlands, Poland, and the United Kingdom, among others. In France, the yellow vests movement argued that the policies of Emmanuel Macron favoured the wealthy in the cities at the expense of poorer rural people. In the United Kingdom, people living in urban areas generally opposed Brexit and favoured closer ties to the European Union, while those living in small towns and rural areas supported Brexit and favoured leaving the European Union. It is among those rural areas in Europe that right-wing populist parties are the strongest, appealing to those who feel they had been left behind by economic globalization and are opposed to the multiculturalism of the major European cities and capitals.

=== North America ===
As in Western Europe, the urban–rural conflict is increasingly a geographic divide in North America, especially in Canada and the United States.

==== Canada ====
Research published in 2021 indicates that, like in Europe, both the centre-left (Liberals) and left-wing (New Democratic Party, NDP) are over represented in urban constituencies. Unlike the Liberals, the NDP still maintains support in certain rural areas with a history of unionized extractive industries, such as mining and logging, which are much more important than urban manufacturing in the history of Canadian labour movement in many regions, particularly Northern Ontario and the British Columbia Interior where the NDP are still competitive. In primarily agricultural and petroleum-producing regions, such as the Prairie Provinces, which was the first heartland of the NDP, the Conservative Party of Canada has dominated since its re-formation in 2003, building on a trend that saw its predecessor parties skewing towards over representation in rural areas since the 1960s. During the 1990s, the Liberals lost some of the traditional support they once had in rural Quebec, and by the new millennium they were almost entirely limited to winning urban and suburban constituencies (outside of Atlantic Canada) while the Conservatives were nearly shut out of the largest cities, further accelerating the trend. As of 2021, the Liberals held 86 seats in the three largest metropolitan areas compared to just eight for the Conservatives.

Trends in provincial elections are broadly similar. After the 2023 Alberta general election, which saw the United Conservative Party win a majority government despite losing many urban seats, Professor Paul Kellogg called the urban–rural divide "one of the most important political questions of our generation". Professor Jared Wesley argues that although the policy differences between the two main parties in Alberta are small, each one appeals to different cohort of people based primarily on a sense of identity, where many rural voters instinctively label themselves as conservative even if they have centrist or centre-left policy preferences. To a lesser extent, urban voters may also label themselves as progressive without regard to policy preferences but the conservative identity has a much older and more durable image in the Albertan cultural imagination. After the 2022 Quebec general election, columnist Emile Nicolas described the province as being split in two, between a liberal Montreal as an island in an otherwise conservative and nationalist province. In the 2024 Saskatchewan general election, the Saskatchewan Party similarly maintained its majority government by dominating rural areas, despite major losses of urban ridings to the Saskatchewan New Democratic Party; historian Ken Coates believed that neither party presented a platform that successfully appealed to both audiences.

==== United States ====
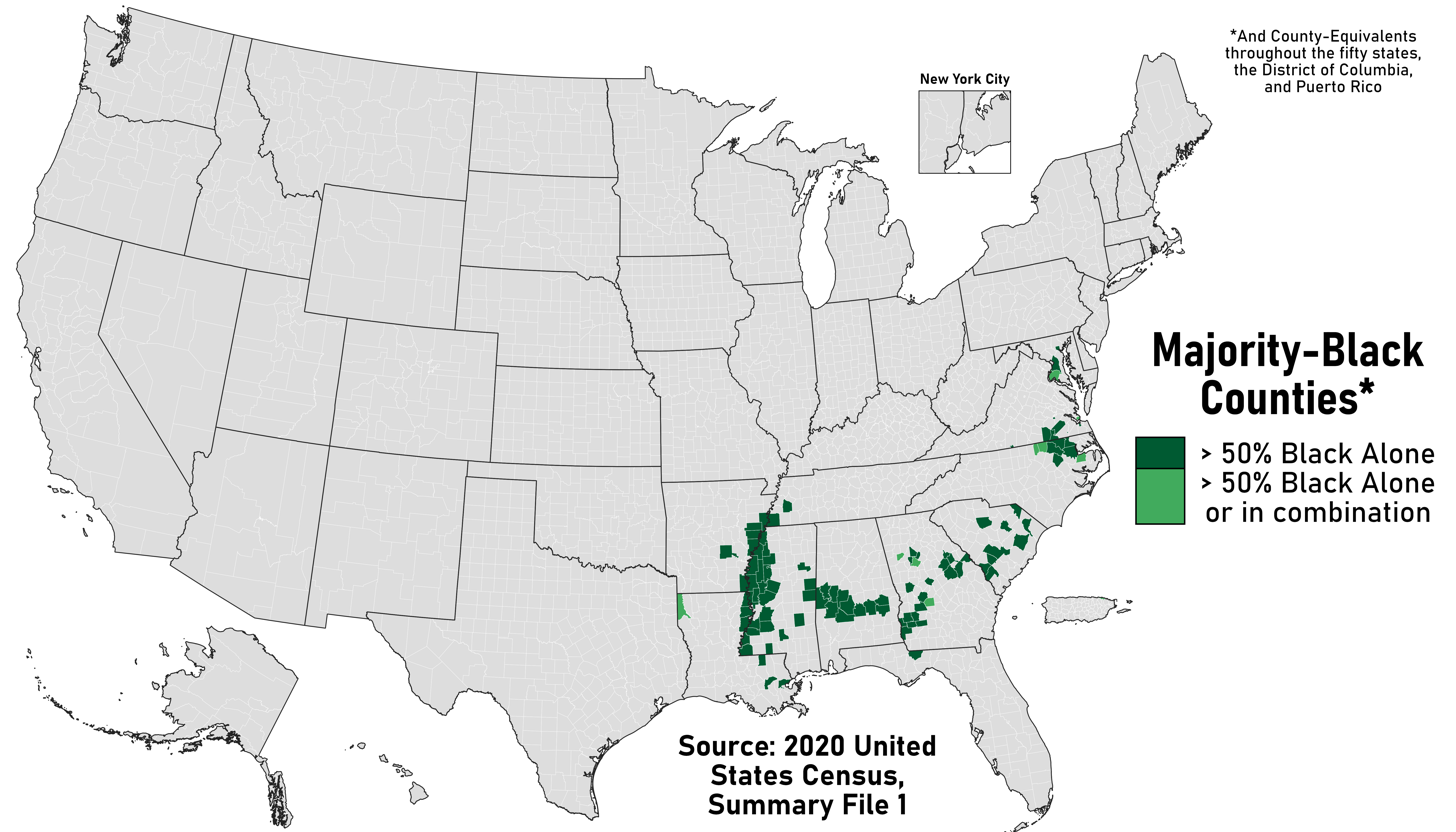
Top to bottom:
2024 U.S. presidential election by county; majority-Black counties as of the 2020 U.S. census

The United States is the most prominent example of the urban–rural divide, among other Western democracies, with its history dating back to the 19th century, continuing well into the 21st century, and increasing under the presidency of Donald Trump during the 2010s and 2020s, with the 2020 United States presidential election. As of 2025, of the mayors of the 50 largest U.S. cities, 38 are Democrats (76%), 9 are Republicans (18%), and 3 are Independents (6%). In 2016, the average Trump support in farm-heavy counties was 73%; it was 76% in 2020; it was 78% in 2024, when he won all but 11 of these 444 counties. According to a 2024 study in the American Political Science Review, the rise of rural conservatism in the U.S. can be linked to technological changes in agriculture in the period following World War II. These changes enabled the rise of capital-intensive agriculture and the growing power of agribusiness. Agribusiness favored conservative economic policies, such as limited government regulation and pro-business tax and spending policies.

The urban–rural divide is not uniform across the United States, with some regions being strongly Democratic (i.e. New England) or strongly Republican (i.e. the Upland South) in both urban and rural areas. Also, rural majority-Black counties vote Democratic, as seen by comparing the county maps of the 2020 United States presidential election and majority-Black counties. The urban–rural divide shrank slightly in the 2024 United States presidential election, due to urban areas typically having a higher cost of living. The Democratic Party's nominee, Kamala Harris, improved among White women with college degrees and maintained her support among African Americans, but collapsed among Hispanic Americans and other racial minorities most affected by the 2021-2023 inflation surge.

Urban–rural conflict in the American South has a complicated and diverse history, with numerous factors contributing to tensions between the two populations. One of the main causes of this tension is the economic divide that has arisen between urban and rural areas. While towns have focused on railways, banking, trade, and absentee land owners, the few cities in the South were river or ocean ports, or textile manufacturing centers. The rural South has been agriculturally oriented regarding cotton, tobacco, and other crops, resulting in economic and social disparities. Additionally, cultural and political differences have contributed to conflict, with rural areas often being more conservative and religious while urban areas tend to be more diverse and liberal. The legacy of racial inequality in the South has also played a significant role in this tension, with many rural areas still struggling with poverty and limited access to education and healthcare. In the 1880–1940 era, Southern demagogues appealed to a poor agrarian base that demanded respect from the much richer business-oriented small towns. In the 20th century rural America, both North and South, used gerrymandering to maintain more power in Congress and state legislatures.

===== 1896 Presidential Election =====
In the 1896 United States presidential election, there was a significant divide in voting patterns between urban and rural areas. The Republican candidate William McKinley was supported by urban areas, particularly in the northeast and Midwest, where the manufacturing industry was hurt by the economic recession underway. McKinley's message of high tariffs and a gold-backed currency resonated with urban voters, who saw these policies as essential for restoring industrial growth and stability. Factory workers voted for McKinley because he promised jobs. On the other hand, the Democratic candidate William Jennings Bryan was supported by rural areas, particularly in the South and West. Bryan demanded rapid inflation in the price of wheat, cotton, and other farm products through the use of free silver as money. His populist economic platform appealed to farmers, who were struggling with low crop prices and debt. Urban workers feared that free silver would raise prices but not wages. The Bryan campaign appealed first of all to farmers. It told urban workers that their return to prosperity was possible only if the farmers prospered first. Bryan made the point bluntly in the "Cross of Gold" speech, delivered in Chicago just 25 years after that city had burned down. He said: "Burn down your cities and leave our farms, and your cities will spring up again; but destroy our farms, and the grass will grow in the streets of every city in the country."

Bryan's juxtaposing "our farms" and "your cities" did not go over well in cities; they voted 59% for McKinley. Among all the nation's industrial cities, Bryan carried only two (Troy, New York, and Fort Wayne, Indiana). The main labor unions were reluctant to endorse Bryan because their members feared inflation. Railroad workers especially worried that Bryan's silver programs would bankrupt the railroads, which were in a shaky financial condition in the depression and whose bonds were payable in gold. Factory workers saw no advantage in inflation to help miners and farmers because their urban cost of living would shoot up and they would be hurt. The McKinley campaign gave special attention to skilled workers, especially in the Midwest and adjacent states. Secret polls show that large majorities of railroad and factory workers voted for McKinley. Overall, McKinley won the election with 271 electoral votes to Bryan's 176, in large part due to his strong support in urban areas.

=== Oceania ===
==== Australia ====
The 2024 Queensland state election. The Blue and the Brown are Conservative LNP-KAP seats in the rural areas. The red are Labor seats in urban Brisbane

The 2026 Farrer by-election. The Rural Seat of Farrer showing in two-candidate preferred that rural areas voting for the Right-wing to far-right party One Nation marked in orange while the major regional city of Albury voting for Milthorpe, a Moderate Independent marked in grey

Australia has two major political parties, namely the centre-left Australian Labor Party and the centre-right Coalition. The Coalition is a political grouping and formal coalition between two centre-right parties: the Liberal Party (which is mostly present in urban areas) and the National Party (which is present in regional and rural areas). The Coalition is formal on the federal level and in two states (New South Wales and Victoria) but is informal in Western Australia and does not exist in South Australia (where the Nationals have limited activity), Tasmania (where the Nationals have limited activity and are unregistered), and the Australian Capital Territory (where the Nationals do not exist); the two parties have merged in Queensland (as the Liberal National Party) and the Northern Territory (as the Country Liberal Party).

There is a political divide between urban (particularly inner-city) regions and the rest of the country (regional, rural, and remote areas). This divide is present nationwide except in the Australian Capital Territory. Regional and rural areas, as well as the outer-suburbs of many cities (namely Sydney), are more conservative than inner-city electorates. Aside from the two major parties, the right-wing Pauline Hanson's One Nation party gathers most of its support in regional areas, particularly in areas with a history of mining, such as the Hunter Valley in New South Wales and several regions of Queensland, while the left-wing Australian Greens gather most of their support from progressive voters, especially younger voters, in the inner-city suburbs of capital cities (especially Melbourne, Brisbane, and Canberra, as well as to a lesser extent Sydney). Teal independents have also seen a rise in support in inner-city parts of Sydney, Melbourne and Perth that normally vote Liberal.

Historically, the most conservative states on the federal level are the northern states and territories (Queensland, Western Australia, and the Northern Territory) and Tasmania. In modern times, Queensland is the most conservative while Tasmania is becoming more conservative-leaning, whereas Western Australia has shifted to the Labor Party, delivering Anthony Albanese a victory at the 2022 Australian federal election. These two states are unique in that they are the only states where less than 50% of the population lives in the capital city (Brisbane and Hobart, respectively) and were considered the states that delivered Scott Morrison a victory at the 2019 Australian federal election. The Nationals are dominant in regional and rural areas, while the Liberals are dominant in many outer-suburbs. In Sydney, there is a north–south divide; traditionally, parts of Sydney north of Sydney Harbour vote Liberal (with some exceptions), while areas south of Sydney Harbour vote Labor (with the exception of the Sutherland Shire, which includes the federal seats of Cook and Hughes). Since the 2022 federal election, the Liberal Party holds just three federal seats in Sydney that are located south of Sydney Harbour: Banks, Cook and Hughes.

In regional and rural electorates, the Coalition holds 34 federal seats, while Labor holds 24. In comparison, the Coalition holds only a few federal seats in the capital cities: five in Sydney, one in Melbourne, two in Brisbane and one in Perth. They hold none in Canberra, Hobart, Adelaide, or Darwin. Nevertheless, liberal conservatism is the dominant form of conservatism and is the ideology of the Coalition, so the regional-rural divide does not affect issues such as same-sex marriage in Australia, which was legalized under the Coalition government of Malcolm Turnbull. Most electorates, regional, rural, and metropolitan, recorded a majority vote in favour of the 2017 Marriage Law Postal Survey. The majority of electorates that recorded a majority opposition vote were electorates in certain outer-suburbs of capital cities (namely Greater Western Sydney but also parts of Melbourne) with large Christian and Muslim communities. While some of these were Liberal-held, many of them were Labor-held. Only three regional electorates recorded a majority opposition vote, all of which were in Queensland: Groom (held by the LNP), Kennedy (held by the right-wing Katter's Australian Party), and Maranoa (held by the LNP).

The 2023 Australian Indigenous Voice referendum results demonstrated some evidence of an urban–rural political divide. The four electorates returning more than 70% of votes in favour were the namesake electorates centred on the CBDs of Melbourne, Sydney, and Canberra, as well as Albanese's inner Sydney electorate of Grayndler. By contrast, the only five electorates to return less than 20% of votes in favour— Maranoa, Flynn, Capricornia, Hinkler, and Dawson—were all rural electorates in southern and central Queensland.

== See also ==
- Agrarianism
- Anti-urbanism
- Centralismo (Peru)
- Cleavage (politics)
- Rural American history
- Singular population entity
