= New Sudbury Centre =

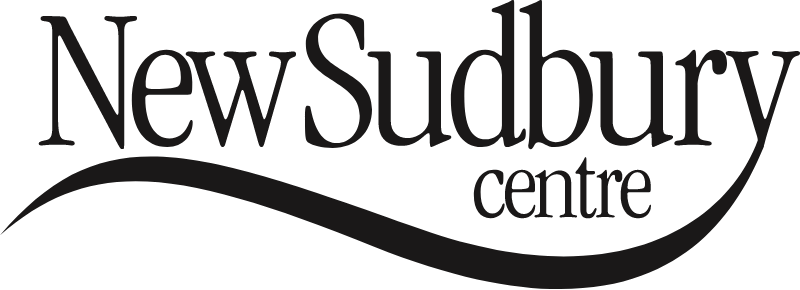
- Location: Greater Sudbury, Ontario, Canada
- Coordinates: 46.52°N 80.946°W
- Opened: 1957
- Manager: PrimarisREIT
- Num. of stores: 110
- Num. of anchor tenants: 4 (1 vacant)
- Floor area: 562,619 square feet (52,269.0 m^{2})
- Floors: 2
- Website: newsudburycentre.ca

The New Sudbury Centre is a shopping mall located in Greater Sudbury, Ontario, Canada. It has 110 stores and 562,619 square feet (52,269.0 m^{2}) of retail space.

== History ==
Built and opened in the 1950s, the entrances to the stores in the New Sudbury Shopping Centre, was originally in a strip mall format with Woolworth and Loblaws at opposite ends, accomplished by walking on the outer perimeter of the mall. "Rue La Ronde," was the first enclosed shopping facility located in the mall which featured both a fountain and resting area. The mall has undergone many renovations since its original design. The food court area used to contain a Loblaws grocery store while a bowling alley was situated in the area of The Source. There used to be a Cochrane's hardware store in the same area.

After the bowling alley closed, Little Joe's pinball arcade opened up across from the bowling alley and became a popular entertainment establishment for the youth during the 1970s and 80s.

The Family Vision Centre is the only service/business remaining of the original mall tenants in 1972 at the New Sudbury Centre.

With the recent expansion of a Walmart into a Walmart Supercentre, New Sudbury Centre had regained the title of largest shopping mall in Northern Ontario. Major tenants include Walmart Supercentre, LensCrafters, Urban Planet, American Eagle Outfitters and Shoppers Drug Mart.

The former Future Shop was originally housed inside the actual shopping mall but relocated to the site of the Sears Garage (now demolished), yet still in the complex. Future Shop was closed in 2015, which is currently occupied by Dollarama and Ardene.

In 1994, Wal-Mart bought the former Woolco location and occupied that location until 2005 when it built a new addition behind the old location, and demolished the old location to reconfigure the parking lot to be more user friendly.

In 2016, the mall planned to upgrade the food court for the first time since 1984 and held its grand opening of the newly renovated food court in February 2017.

The Sears store closed on January 14, 2018 with the liquidation of Sears Canadian operations, and the space is now home to Sport Chek and H&M.
