= Rosvall and Voutilainen =

Viljo Rosvall and Janne Voutilainen
- Born: Thunder Bay, Ontario
- Died: November 18, 1929 (disappearance) / April 28, 1930 (funeral)
- Occupation: Finnish-Canadian trade unionists

Viljo Rosvall and Janne Voutilainen were two Finnish-Canadian unionists from Thunder Bay, Ontario and members of the Lumber Workers Industrial Union of Canada who mysteriously disappeared on November 18, 1929, and were later found dead. The two were on their way to a bush camp near Onion Lake to line up bush workers for a sympathy strike in conjunction with a large strike that was happening in Shabaqua and Shebandowan, west of Thunder Bay.

== Discovery of the bodies and funeral ==
The bodies of Rosvall and Voutilainen were found by a union search party, which included Aate Pitkanen, at Onion Lake the following spring. The men's funeral on April 28, 1930, was the largest ever held in Thunder Bay. Adding to the legendary status of the event, a solar eclipse darkened the sky as the funeral procession marched to Riverside Cemetery. The funeral events were regarded as the symbolic beginning of the Great Depression for local residents.

== Cause of death ==
The official cause of death was ruled to be accidental drownings. However, members of the Finnish community in Thunder Bay stated they suspected the two had been murdered by thugs employed by the bushcamp boss. Evidence that the two men had struggled before their deaths as well as the questionable matter that two experienced bushworkers had drowned in shallow water added to the feeling that foul play was involved. Furthermore, some community members claimed that the hired thugs had been shipped to Finland after the murder.

== Legacy ==
The case of Rosvall and Voutilainen continues to be controversial. An Ontario Historical Plaque was erected by the province to commemorate Rosvall and Voutilainen's role in Ontario's heritage. The plaque was erected in Centennial Park, which has a small logging museum. The park is located on Current River, which flows out of Onion Lake where the bodies were found approximately 20 kilometres away. The plaque reads

On November 18, 1929, Finnish-Canadians Viljo Rosvall and Janne Voutilainen left the Port Arthur area for Onion Lake, 20 kilometres upstream from there to recruit bushworkers for a strike. Their bodies were found at Onion Lake the following spring. Local unionists and many Finnish-Canadians suspected foul play, but coroner's juries ruled the deaths accidental drownings. The two men's funeral on April 28, 1930, is remembered as the largest ever held in Port Arthur. As thousands of mourners marched to Riverside Cemetery, an eclipse of the sun darkened the sky. The mystery surrounding the deaths of Rosvall and Voutilainen endures, sustaining them in public memory as martyrs to the cause of organized labour.

As an event that has seeped into more mainstream Canadian consciousness, the case of Rosvall and Voutilainen has aroused interest from academics, unionists, and authors. For instance, Michael Ondaatje's 1987 novel In the Skin of a Lion gives a fictionalized account of the murder of Rosvall and Voutilainen.

== Continuing controversy ==
Historian Peter Raffo has analyzed the oral and written evidence, and concluded, "According to the contemporary historical record, the likelihood is that Rosvall and Voutilainen were not murdered. The oral record - the myth - does not stand up well to close examination. Practically none of its details are sustained by the facts of the case... Not martyrs so much as tragic and brave victims."

Raffo's analysis, however, might be criticized from at least two different angles: firstly, the reliability of Raffo's access and interpretation of the oral record as a non-Finnish speaking academic; and secondly, as an interpretation based almost entirely on the "oral record" for evidence, largely neglecting other important elements in the case of Rosvall and Voutilainen.

Satu Repo, for instance, observes in her article "Rosvall and Voutilainen: Two Union Men Who Never Died" that

The advances made by [social historians such as] E.P. Thompson in expanding historical writing about the working class to include the experienced, "lived" quality of history, the way the past felt to the contemporaries, are not easy to apply to Canadian working-class history. There are several reasons for this. Not only is it hard to find records from which to construct the subjective side of working-class lives, (this is presumably the case everywhere), but these records, even when they do exist, speak in the numerous languages of our ethnically fragmented population. The precondition to access to some of them requires a kind of double identity, an ability to be on intimate terms with some "other" Canadian experience, and at the same time the capability of communicating that experience to the mainstream culture. An additional problem, of course, is the highly selective nature of any such records. For obviously it is not some homogeneous working class, but certain self-conscious and articulate minorities who are likely to leave a record of any kind.

Repo thus raises the question of how accurate Raffo's analysis could be, given that Raffo lacked direct access to Finnish-language sources. It could be charged further that Raffo's article is an inappropriate attempt to use a highly emotional and controversial event in Thunder Bay labour history as merely a case study in oral history.

As for the second criticism, the reliance on oral history does not address many of the facts of the case. Voutilainen was a trapper who had maintained trap lines in the Onion Lake area for several years, and thus, intimately familiar with the area. How could an experienced trapper with an intimate knowledge of the local environment fall through ice and drown in (at most) three and a half feet of water? The testimony of the official coroner, Dr. Crozier, also raises doubts. Not only was his testimony highly agitated and hostile, but Crozier also belonged to an anti-union "citizens' group" formed around the time of the Winnipeg General Strike. Other inconsistencies include contradictory statements from the camp boss, Maki, and evidence of injuries on the bodies suggesting a struggle before their drowning. That violent methods were used by employers, the authorities, and/or vigilantes to disrupt or discourage union activity around this time in North America is not unusual. The lynching of Frank Little, the case of Sacco and Vanzetti, the Everett Massacre, and the Estevan Riot, to name only a few, clearly show that violent and brutal means were commonplace in class conflict.

Anti-union violence including targeted physical assaults and targeted murders continue to be common and a sad truth in the City of Thunder Bay to the present day. The oral history in Thunder Bay’s Finnish community is that Rosvall and Voutilainen were murdered for their pro-union efforts, resulting in the authorities in Thunder Bay conducting a major cover up in an attempt to conceal the truth. Thunder Bay remains a hotbed of anti-union violence against pro-union individuals, resulting in Thunder Bay being labelled the Capital of Anti-Union Violence in Canada. Anti-union violence remains common to this day aided by the authorities in Thunder Bay, including the police, Ministry of Labour and corrupt unions, all of whom are involved in covering up the truth.

== See also ==
- List of solved missing person cases
- Timeline of labour issues and events in Canada
