= 1978 Inco strike =

1970s Canadian labour strike

- Date: 15 September 1978 - 7 June 1979
- Location: Sudbury area, Ontario, Canada
- Caused by: Attempted pay cut and layoff by management
- Methods: Strike, picket lines
- Result: Victory for workers, new contract signed

Parties
United Steelworkers Local 6500	Inco Ltd.

Lead figures
Dave Patterson	

Number
11,600 workers	

The Inco strike of 1978 (locally referred to as the Sudbury Strike of 1978) was a strike by workers at Inco's operations in Sudbury, Ontario, which lasted from 15 September 1978 until 7 June 1979. It was the longest strike in Inco or Sudbury history until the strike of 2009–10, and at the time broke the record for the longest strike in Canada. It has been noted as one of the most important labour disputes in Canadian history.

== Overview ==
The conflict was caused by proposed layoffs and cuts to pay and benefits by Inco management, with low nickel prices as a justification.

Around 11,600 workers were involved in the strike, which affected the wages sustaining 43,000 people, or about 26% of the population of metropolitan Sudbury. By the end of the strike, the company had been starved of over twenty-two million hours of labour, smashing records for the longest strike in both Canadian and Inco history.

Community support for the union was strong, with local politicians such as future mayor and then-Member of Parliament John Rodriguez as well as other New Democrats vocally supporting the strikers. A major role was played by women's support committees, which had also existed during the 1958 strike.

== Aftermath ==
The role of women in the community during the strike was profiled in the 1980 documentary film A Wives' Tale (Une histoire de femmes).

Concessions won as a result of the strike included Inco's "thirty-and-out" policy, whereby workers with thirty years at the company could retire with a full pension, regardless of age. As well, most miners received a dollar an hour wage increase.

A study on alcohol consumption showed that over 35% of strikers and over 40% of their wives reportedly stopped drinking alcohol or drank dramatically less during the course of the strike, while a small minority drank much more, hypothesized as being stress-induced. Overall, alcohol sales declined by 10% during the strike as compared to the previous winter, likely due to economic reasons.

This effect was mirrored in the rest of the local economy, which was catastrophically affected. This would later play a critical role in spurring new economic development efforts in the city into the 1980s and 1990s; when a longer strike hit the same operations, now owned by Vale, in 2009, the action had a much more modest effect on the city's economy than the 1978 strike, with the local rate of unemployment declining slightly during the strike.

== See also ==
- Timeline of labour in Greater Sudbury
