= Sudbury Steelworkers Hall =

Coordinates: 46.49547°N 81.00043°W

- Interactive map of the Sudbury Steelworkers Hall area

General information
- Location: Sudbury, Ontario, Canada
- Completed: 1947
- Demolished: September 19, 2008
- Client: United Steelworkers; Locals 2200, 6500

The Sudbury Steelworkers Hall was a historic labour union hall in Sudbury, Ontario, which was destroyed by a fire on September 19, 2008.

== History ==
Located at 92 Frood Road in Downtown Sudbury, on the northwest corner of the intersection with College Street, the building was originally built in 1947 as a Royal Canadian Legion hall. Following several years of labour unrest in the city resulting from factional wars between Inco and Falconbridge mining employees over representation by the United Steelworkers of America or the Mine, Mill and Smelter Workers, most workers eventually reconciled under the leadership of the Steelworkers. With the need to acquire a new home for the expanded union organization, representatives Don McNabb and Gib Gilchrist selected the hall, which the Legion had put up for sale due to declining membership. The union purchased the building, and moved into it on November 25, 1965.

The building was also considered a local institution by the wider community, often being rented out as a banquet and reception hall and as a meeting venue for community groups, political party nomination contests, fundraising events and other community functions. The building also housed some of Laurentian University's classes prior to the construction of the university's current campus in 1964.

=== Fire ===
Shortly after 2 a.m. on September 19, 2008, a fire broke out in the building's banquet room. Fire alarms first went off at 2:12 a.m.

The Greater Sudbury Fire Service responded to the alarms, and the fire appeared to be under control by 6 a.m. However, an isolated pocket of the fire later erupted again, and by 9:30 a.m. the revived fire had reached the building's second floor offices. By 11:15 a.m., police ordered the evacuation of the nearby Sudbury Secondary School and Lansdowne Public School. Lansdowne students were bussed to Lo-Ellen Park Secondary School in the city's south end, while Sudbury Secondary students were moved to Lockerby Composite School. At the end of the school day, students who would ordinarily walk home from Lansdowne and Sudbury Secondary were bussed to St. David's Catholic Elementary School for vehicle pickup by their parents.

With the fire remaining out of control, late that afternoon the decision was made to begin pulling down the building's walls in an attempt to contain the fire's spread. Excavators began creating a platform at around 6 p.m., and around 7:15 p.m. the excavators began to pull down the walls.

The fire was not fully extinguished until approximately 4 a.m. on September 20, 26 hours after it began. Firefighters used more than one million gallons of water to douse the flames.

United Steelworkers regional director Wayne Fraser issued a statement calling the fire a tragedy both for the union and the city as a whole:

A large part of the history of Sudbury and the United Steelworkers has literally gone up in smoke. I grew up going to meetings in that hall, as did tens of thousands of other USW members. It is where we worked, socialized, fought and made up. We were educated there. It was our university and our home for over 40 years.

Ontario New Democratic Party leader Howard Hampton also issued a statement, speaking about the building's special place in the hearts of party members in the Sudbury area:

The hall has a special meaning for Sudbury New Democrats who saw it as a home away from home. It’s where they gathered regularly for nomination meetings, fundraisers, and community forums. It’s where former MPP Shelley Martel won her first nomination meeting in May 1987 and, where, two decades later, she announced her retirement from provincial politics. It’s also where current Nickel Belt MPP France Gélinas announced her intention to replace Martel and where the symbolic torch was passed from the Martel political dynasty to her.

Many of the union's records, including active files and archives comprising a major part of the city's documented labour history, were destroyed in the fire. Leo Gerard, a former leader of Local 6500 who has been the president of the Steelworkers International since 2001, returned to Sudbury on the weekend and spoke to the media, stating that "next to losing a family member, this is the most traumatic event in my life."

At the time of the fire, the hall had already been booked solid for events every weekend through 2010.

== Aftermath ==
The intersection of Frood Road and College Street remained closed to traffic for most of the weekend as police investigated the fire.

On September 22, the city's acting fire chief, Dan Stack, explained the fire department's findings regarding how the fire went back out of control after initially appearing to have been doused:

At some point we thought we had it contained. But with compartmentation, in a building that's been added on and added on, it got into some of the other compartments. Once we opened up some of these other compartments, we had another situation of a lot of flame. So then, we had to redirect our attack. The way the building was constructed, the way the beams ran through the building ... and when you do construction in a building that's 60 years or better in age, you don't rip off roofs, you add on. So what happened is it got caught up in some of the beams and ran along and we couldn't get at it.

At the same press conference, the office of the Ontario Fire Marshal confirmed that the blaze was being investigated as a potential arson. The Greater Sudbury Police Service issued a request for information, offering a $1,000 reward for tips given to the city's CrimeStoppers line. The Steelworkers locals in Sudbury and Sault Ste. Marie, as well as the head office of United Steelworkers International, later made additional donations which resulted in the reward being increased to $15,000 on September 29.

After accepting many equipment and furniture donations from the community, the union moved into new temporary offices at 128 Pine Street on September 26.

The Greater Sudbury Police Service announced on November 3, 2008, that two 12-year-old boys had been arrested in conjunction with the fire. The boys reportedly poured a flammable accelerant into one of the building's outer ventilation ducts, which they then lit with a match. Under the provisions of Canada's Youth Criminal Justice Act, the two cannot be publicly identified in the media.

Full demolition of the building began in January 2009.

In June 2009, the Steelworkers chose not to build a new facility on the original site but instead purchased a former grocery store, which was shut down by the Loeb chain in February 2009, as the new hall. The new facility, located at 66 Brady Street, is 29,000 square feet (2,700 m^{2}) in size. The union held the new hall's grand opening on January 26, 2012.
