= Vapaus =

Communist newspaper

Vapaus (Freedom) was a Finnish-Canadian communist newspaper, published in Sudbury, Ontario from 1917 to 1974. Vapaus, whose content was published in the Finnish language, was closely associated with the Finnish Organization of Canada, an organization connected to the Communist Party of Canada.

The paper was noted for the 1929 trial and conviction of editor Arvo Vaara on charges of sedition and libel. The charge stemmed from purportedly unpatriotic remarks against King George V published in the paper, although a community religious group made larger claims that the paper was "subversive of morals and good Canadian citizenship". T.D. Jones, a United Church clergyman who led the campaign against Vapaus, asserted that the Finnish community in the Sudbury area was "living in terror" of Communist intimidation, that children were being indoctrinated with seditious ideas and that the paper was undermining the sanctity of marriage by encouraging Finnish families to live in common-law relationships.

Vaara was defended in the trial by Arthur Roebuck, who would later become Attorney General of Ontario in the government of Mitchell Hepburn. He was convicted and sentenced to six months in jail and a $1,000 fine.

In 1974, the newspaper merged with the Finnish-Canadian literary magazine Liekki, moved to Toronto and was renamed Viikkosanomat. Later the paper took up its old name Vapaus, and continued publication until 1990. Its role was continued partially by the magazine Kaiku, published by the Finnish Organization of Canada since 1990. Kaiku is predominantly in English, with pages in Finnish as well.
