= Finnish Organization of Canada =

Finnish-Canadian cultural association

Finnish Organization of Canada (FOC, Finnish: Kanadan Suomalainen Järjestö) is a Finnish Canadian cultural organization. It was established in 1911 as the Finnish Socialist Organization of Canada (Kanadan Suomalainen Sosialistinen Järjestö). FOC is the oldest nationwide cultural organization for Finns in Canada. It was first connected with Social Democratic Party of Canada and later with Communist Party of Canada. Today FOC is no longer associated with politics. It has fewer than 200 members, who are mostly senior citizens in the areas of Toronto, Vancouver, Sudbury and Thunder Bay.

== History ==
The Finnish Organization of Canada was established in October 1911 by Finnish socialists who were expelled from the Socialist Party of Canada. A key person in its founding was the Finnish-Canadian agitator and feminist Sanna Kannasto. By the end of 1911 FOC had 19 locals and more than 1,500 members. Three years later the member count was more than 3,000 with 64 locals across the country. Five hundred of the members were women. Throughout the 1920s and 1930s, the organization came into almost continuous conflict with liberal, social-democratic, and conservative factions both within and without the Finnish community in Canada, evidenced by the rumours of "reception committees" active in communities around Sudbury where newly immigrated Finns would be vetted by local committees which would separate them into "Reds" or "Whites", with identified Reds being approved to settle and Whites encouraged to move elsewhere. In 1931 the social democrats left the FOC and organization was fully related with communists. It was banned in 1940 due to the Defence of Canada Regulations but declared legal again in 1943 as Canada had become an ally with Soviet Union in 1941.

FOC published the Finnish-language newspaper Vapaus in Sudbury from 1917 to 1974. The previous newspaper Työkansa had gone bankrupt in 1915.

== See also ==
- Finnish Labour Temple

=== Archives ===
There is a Finnish Organization of Canada fonds at Library and Archives Canada. The archival reference number is R5279.
