= Chapples Park =

Park and golf course in Ontario, Canada

Coordinates: 48°23′35″N 89°15′55″W

- Interactive map of Chapples Park
- Type: Golf course, public park
- Location: Thunder Bay, Ontario, Canada
- Area: 120 hectares (300 acres)
- Operator: City of Thunder Bay

Chapples Park is located in the centre of Fort William, Ontario, which today forms the south end of Thunder Bay. It forms a key part of Thunder Bay's recreation trail system.

The park's main feature is an 18-hole, 6,236 yards (5,702 m), par 71 golf course operated by the city. The course includes a practice range. In the centre of the park is a recreation area featuring tennis courts, a soccer field, and baseball diamonds.

The Thunder Bay Centennial Botanical Conservatory is located on the eastern edge of the park, accessible via Dease Street. The conservatory displays plants from around the world in a tropical setting. The facility was first opened in 1967 as a centennial project.

== See also ==
- Thunder Bay Soroptimist International Friendship Garden
- Fort William Stadium
- Chapples Park Stadium
