= Loch Lomond (Thunder Bay District) =

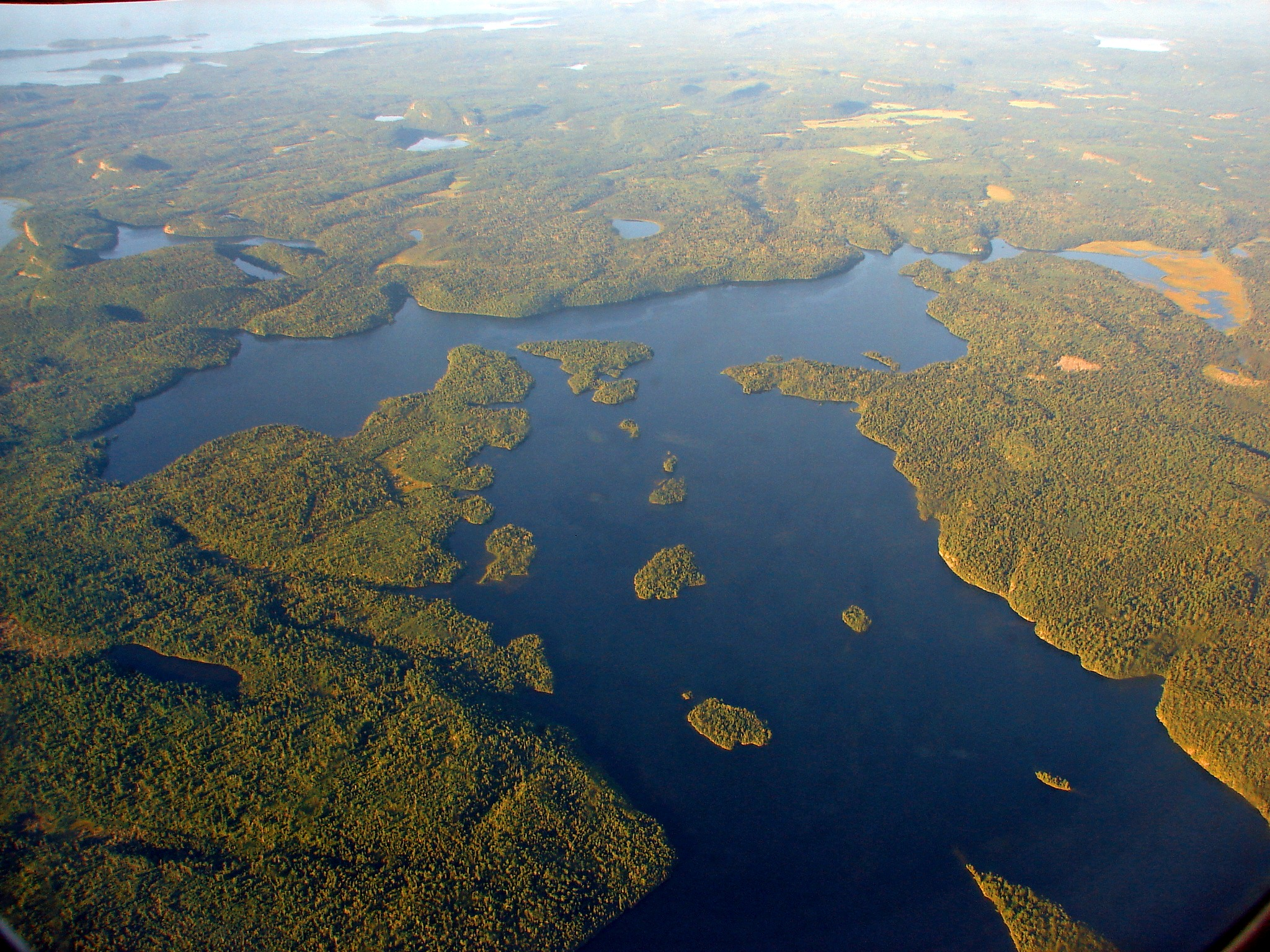

- Location in Ontario
- Location: Thunder Bay District, Ontario
- Coordinates: 48°15′25″N 89°19′28″W
- Type: Deep oligotrophic lake
- Part of: Great Lakes Basin
- Primary inflows: Underground spring
- Primary outflows: Lomond River
- Basin countries: Canada
- Max. length: 9 kilometres (5.6 mi)
- Max. width: 1.6 kilometres (0.99 mi)
- Average depth: 27 metres (89 ft)
- Max. depth: >73 metres (240 ft)
- Surface elevation: 286 metres (938 ft)
- Frozen: December to April
- Islands: 13
- Settlements: Thunder Bay

Loch Lomond is a large spring-fed lake located 102 metres (335 ft) above Lake Superior, 6 kilometres (3.7 mi) south of the city of Thunder Bay, Ontario, Canada. It is located in behind Mount McKay, in the Fort William First Nation and Neebing Municipality. Loch Lomond is considered to be a deep oligotrophic lake. The natural re-charge level of Loch Lomond from underground spring water is estimated at 57,100 m^{3} (12,600,000 imp gal) per day.

It is approximately 9 kilometres (5.6 mi) long and averages about 1.6 kilometres (0.99 mi) in width. The extreme depths over most of its area causes the greater part of Loch Lomond to become stratified each summer and has characteristically low temperatures in the hypolimnion.

== History ==
This body of water bore the Ojibwe name Gaa-zaasaagijiwegamaag (recorded as "kazazeekeege waigamag") meaning "the high lake that is always overflowing", but a Scotsman of the North West Company thought it so much looked like the original Loch Lomond that he named it as such.

During the year 1906 the city of Fort William began tunnelling through the rock of Mount McKay and laying water pipe, but it was not until 1909 that the first water flowed through the pipes and into the homes of residents of Fort William. The engineering department of the city of Fort William was headed by city engineer H. Sydney Hancock Jr., who was Waterworks engineer from February 1906 to February 1911. He was in charge of the construction of the Loch Lomond Water Supply system. Fort William's water supply was contaminated in 1906 leading to a typhoid epidemic. The City Council's response was to construct a tunnel under the Kaministiquia River to bring pure water to Fort William from Loch Lomond. Tunnels were drilled through Mount McKay to the Loch at a final cost of $500,000. The system was completed in 1910. In 2006, the Bare Point Water Treatment Plant on Thunder Bay was expanded to serve the entire city from a single source.

In order to prevent pollution all activities including travel and fishing are prohibited on Loch Lomond.
