= Current River, Thunder Bay, Ontario =

Neighbourhood in Thunder Bay, Ontario

Coordinates: 48°28′00″N 89°11′00″W

Current River
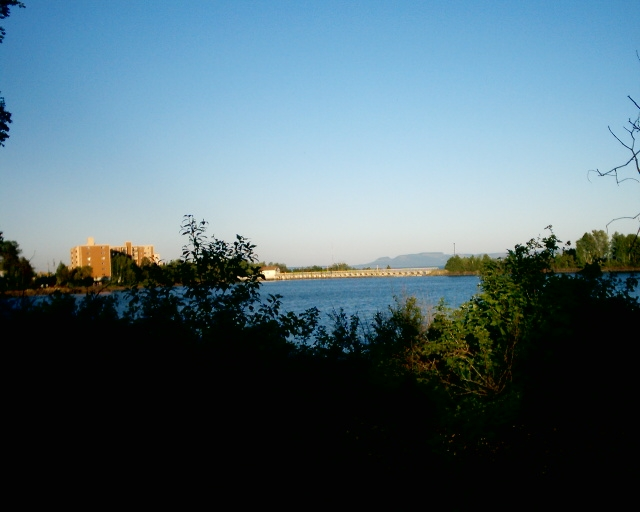
- Looking south at Boulevard Lake
Population; 4,780	Ward; Current River
- Location of Current River in Thunder Bay

Current River is a neighbourhood located north east of Port Arthur in the city of Thunder Bay, Ontario. It is separated from the main urban area of Thunder Bay by the Current River Greenway, a large parkland along the river after which the neighbourhood was named. It is home to approximately 4,780 people and has an ageing and declining population.

Current River is located entirely in Current River Ward and is represented on Thunder Bay City Council by Andrew Foulds.

== History ==
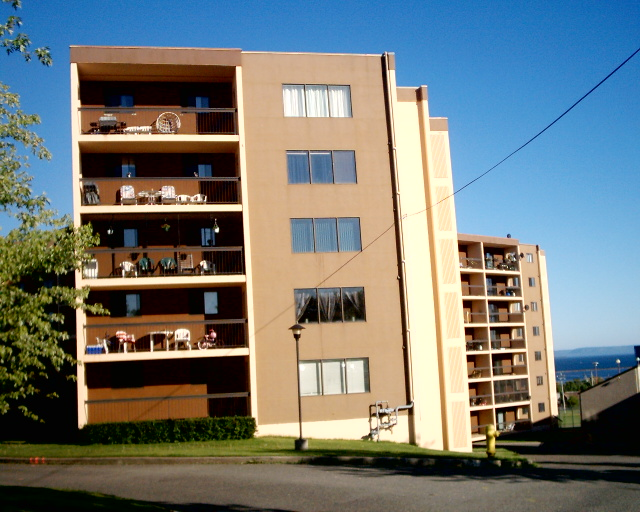
An apartment block

Development of Current River began after World War II, and many homes in the neighbourhood are "Victory Homes", a post-war building style that allowed fast manufacture of single-family dwellings. Development in the neighbourhood progressed northward, and as one travels further north Victory Homes become less common, being replaced with more contemporary building styles. A small cluster of highrise apartments is located beside an outcrop of the Canadian Shield in the southernmost portion of the residential neighbourhood, and offers its residents a view of the Current River Greenway and Thunder Bay.

== Geography ==
Current River is located in the northeast portion of Thunder Bay. It is located east of the Current River and Boulevard Lake and north of Lake Superior. The land inclines as one travels north from the Lake Superior and west from Hodder Avenue.

== Economy ==
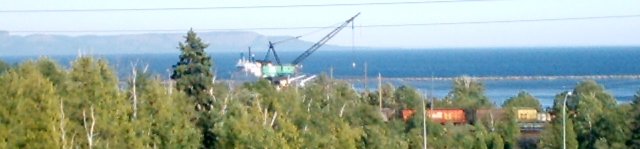
Port Arthur shipyard

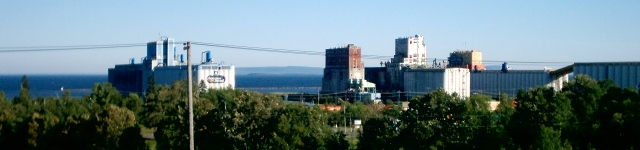
Grain elevators

Along the shores of Lake Superior to the south and east of the neighbourhood is an abundance of industries. Separated from the main neighbourhood by Hodder Avenue and the Canadian Pacific Railway and Canadian National Railway mainlines is the Port Arthur Shipbuilding Company (PASCO) drydock and shipyard, which has been operating since 1909, and the Thunder Bay Fine Papers mill, formerly Cascades. Further east is the abandoned Smurfit-Stone factory, and the Bare Point water treatment plant which is the main source of drinking water in Thunder Bay. Grain elevators located south of the Current River dominate the view toward the lake.

Current River is home to a small selection of commercial businesses. Mainly located along Hodder Avenue near Arundel Street, the neighbourhood is home to a strip mall with a pharmacy and grocery store, a convenience store and gas station, and several restaurants and coffee shops. Most businesses in the neighbourhood are locally owned.

== Transportation ==
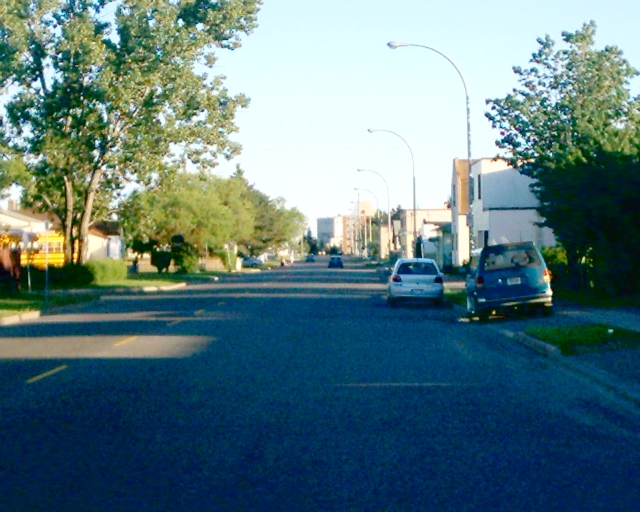
Grenville Avenue

The main roads in the neighbourhood are Arundel Street, an east–west arterial road that bridges the Current River and connects the community to the Shuniah neighbourhood. Hodder Avenue is the main north–south thoroughfare and forms the backbone of the community's small commercial strip. It connects the neighbourhood to both Highway 11/17 (allowing highway access) and Cumberland Street (leading to the remaining city) Grenville Avenue, which is separated into two sections by the Current River Playfield, formed the neighbourhood's original business corridor.

Thunder Bay Transit route 17 Current River makes a counterclockwise loop through the neighbourhood and brings residents south to downtown Port Arthur (Waterfront Terminal). This route serves this neighbourhood with a frequency of 45 minutes.

== Education ==
Current River is home to two schools. Claude E. Garton Public School is part of the Lakehead Public Schools system and offers French immersion classes grades JK-8, and is located in the southern part of the neighbourhood. St. Paul which is grades JK-6 Catholic School is located in the northern part of Current River, and is part of the Thunder Bay Catholic District School Board. For secondary education, Public school students from Current River attend Superior Collegiate and Vocational Institute, and Catholic school students attend St. Ignatius, both located on the other side of Boulevard Lake.

== Recreation ==
Current River is the location of the largest park in Thunder Bay, the Current River Greenway. The 260 hectares (640 acres) park includes Boulevard Lake, one of the Thunder Bay's most popular summer destinations. The Current River Playfield, located in the middle of Current River, includes a community centre, arena, baseball diamonds, soccer fields, and seasonal ice rinks.

The municipally operated Strathcona Golf Course is located to the east of Current River, and is an 18-hole, 72-par course.Centennial Park, a recreation of a 20th-century logging camp, is located northwest of the neighbourhood. The Terry Fox Memorial and Lookout is northeast of the neighbourhood, located along Highway 11/17. It commemorates Terry Fox's Marathon of Hope and offers panoramic views of the lake.
