= Hillcrest Park (Thunder Bay) =

Municipal park and lookout in Thunder Bay, Ontario

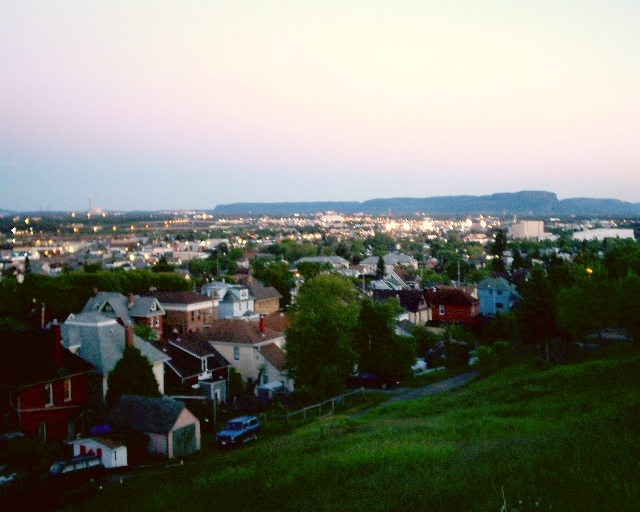
- View from park looking South towards Mt. McKay
- Interactive map of Hillcrest Park
- Type: Public park
- Location: Thunder Bay, Ontario, Canada
- Coordinates: 48.43482911021281°N 89.23451581862652°W
- Operator: City of Thunder Bay
- Website: https://www.thunderbay.ca/en/recreation/city-parks.aspx#hillcrest-park

Hillcrest Park is a public park located in Thunder Bay, Ontario. The Park is located in the city's north end (formerly Port Arthur, Ontario). The Park's location provides scenic views of the city, the harbour, and the Sleeping Giant. It is one of only a few higher-elevation sites where such scenic views are available.

Located within the park is a World War II memorial for the Lake Superior Regiment. The memorial includes an honour roll of those killed in action, and a Universal Carrier; a vehicle used by the regiment. The park also features a stone wall, cannons, and the 1884 Port Arthur Central Fire Station bell. A plaque recognizing the Cummins Site, a 9000+ year old Paleo-Indian archaeological site, is also located at Hillcrest Park. To the north end of the park is the Sunken Gardens with over 70 varieties of flowers in a unique configuration of walkways and benches.

On September 30, 2022, a flag was raised at half-staff in the park to honour residential school victims and survivors.
