= Current River Greenway =

Public greenspace in Thunder Bay, Ontario

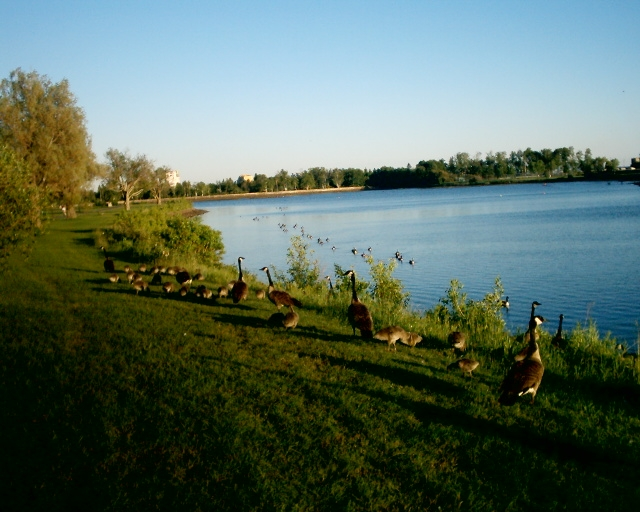
- North shore of Boulevard Lake, looking east, on a summer evening
- Interactive map of Current River Greenway
- Type: Conservation Area and Public Park
- Location: Thunder Bay, Ontario, Canada
- Coordinates: 48°27′30″N 89°11′41″W
- Area: 263 hectares (650 acres)
- Operator: City of Thunder Bay, Parks Division; Lakehead Regional Conservation Authority

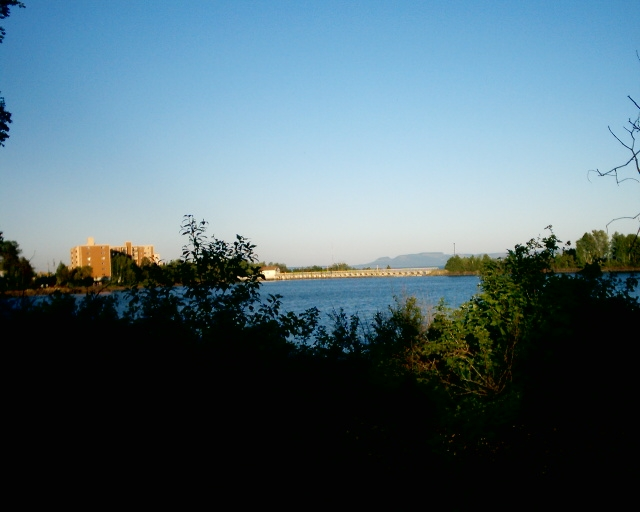
Boulevard Lake dam.

The Current River Greenway is a 263 hectare (650 acre) greenway located in Current River neighbourhood in the north end of Thunder Bay, Ontario along the Current River.

Throughout the Greenway is 50 km of public trails that are part of the Thunder Bay Recreational Trails and the Trans Canada Trail system. Five kilometres of paved trail circle Boulevard Lake. Part of the trail system incorporates the Black Bay Bridge, North America's first single spandrel, reinforced concrete bridge, which was built in 1911. The trails around Boulevard Lake are also used for various walking marathons in support of local and national charities. Trails outside of the Boulevard Lake area are not paved.

== Adelaide Butterfly Garden ==
The Adelaide Butterfly Garden is located in Boulevard Lake Park, at the foot of Adelaide Street and close to the Boulevard Lake Dam. The garden was established in 2018, on a City-owned empty lot. The initial organizer of the garden project was city employee Dan Fulton; volunteers have continued to coordinate the garden after his death in 2021. Planting has been focused on native plant species and supporting pollinators, particularly the Monarch Butterfly. Planting, weeding, and maintenance is carried out by volunteers.

== Birch Point Park ==
Birch Point Park is located on Birch Point, a peninsula in that separates Boulevard Lake two portions. The park was dedicated in 2000 as part of the Millennium project. It features a sculpture representing the city's forestry heritage and its designation as the Forest Capital of Canada 2000, as well as walking paths and specimens of each of Canada's provincial trees. It is one of the most recent additions to the Boulevard Lake Park network. Birch Point Park is also home to Thunder Bay's first public Disc Golf course. The course is 18 baskets and was installed July 2010.

== Bluffs Scenic Lookout ==
The Bluffs Scenic Lookout is located above the Current River, accessible off of Arundel Street north of Boulevard Lake. The site provides panoramic views of the Black Bay Bridge, Boulevard Lake, and the Sleeping Giant. It is open to the public year-round.

== Boulevard Lake Park ==
Boulevard Lake Park is a large public park area located in and maintained by the city of Thunder Bay, Ontario, Canada. The park is centred on Boulevard Lake, which was created in 1901 after the construction of a dam resulted in the flooding a large area northeast of what was then the town of Port Arthur, Ontario. The first park was established in 1903 and since then it has proved to be a very popular destination for locals.

The main park is 74ha located on the west shore of the southern portion of Boulevard Lake. Its features include a playground, a supervised sand beach, canoeing, kayaking and various other water sports, mini golf, a tennis court, picnic tables, a concession area, washrooms and changing rooms, and paddle boat and canoe rentals. The main park plays host to the Thunder Bay Dragon Boat Festival in late July, a two-day event featuring dragon boat races and live musical performances and concessions. The most recent annual event to take place at the park is the International Wakeboard Festival in late June.

Winter activities include tobogganing down the slope on the eastern shore of the north portion of the lake.

== Cascades Conservation Area ==
The Cascades Conservation Area is a 162 hectare conservation area is located north of Thunder Bay, Ontario and is accessible via Balsam Street. It is connected to Trowbridge Falls Park and Centennial Park by a series of hiking trails. The landscape features cascades in the river set against rock outcrops in a birch and poplar forest.

== Centennial Park ==
Centennial Park is a recreation of a 1910 logging camp. It was created in 1967 as a centennial project.

== Current River Park ==
Current River Park, formerly known as Casino Park, is located on North Cumberland Street. It features a horseshoe pitching area and a model RC car track, as well as a public gathering area. Located to the east is the Current River and the "fish stairs", a rocky area created by the damming of the Current River. Plans are underway to expand the Current River Park to the shore of Thunder Bay and connect the walking trails with 52 km of waterfront.

== Evergreen Park ==
Evergreen Park is located to the east of the north portion of Boulevard Lake. Its open spaces often are used for public gatherings.

== Trowbridge Falls Park ==
Trowbridge Falls is a 302 hectare conservation area located on an area of rapids on the Current River, across from Centennial Park. It is connected to Centennial Park by a small bridge, allowing access to trails in Centennial Park. It is also connected to the Cascades Conservation Area to the north. The park features 140 tent and trailer campsites, served by a small store, showers and restrooms, laundry facilities and a dump station. Cross country skiing is a popular winter activity in the park. According to local legend, the park is haunted.

== Dick Waddington Park ==
Located east of the northern portion of Boulevard Lake, the Dick Waddington Park features an indoor building which is used to host public events such as dances and town hall meetings, baseball diamonds and soccer pitches, and an indoor arena. It was named after Richard (Dick) Waddington, a former city councilor, in 2008.
