= Canada Games Complex =

Canadian sports facility

Coordinates: 48°25′25″N 89°14′29″W

- The Complex
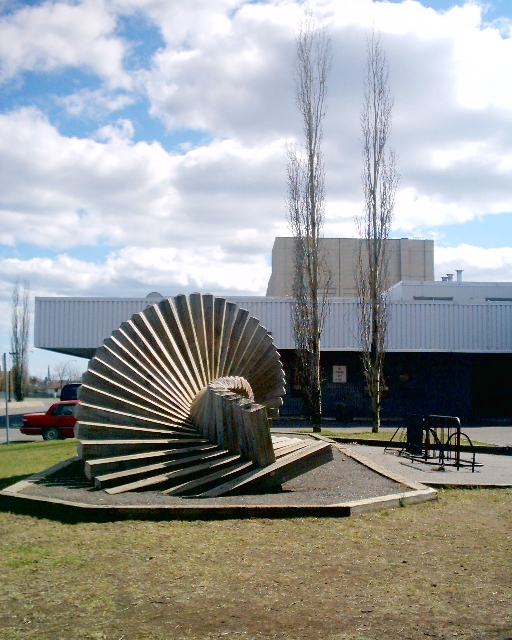
- The sculpture "Vertere"
- Interactive map of Canada Games Complex
- Address: 420 Winnipeg Avenue
- Location: Thunder Bay, Ontario, Canada
- Owner: The City of Thunder Bay
- Capacity: 800 (Pool Bleachers)
- Public transit: Thunder Bay Transit 15

Construction
- Groundbreaking: May 31, 1979
- Opened: August 1981
- Cost: C$7.1 million
- Architects: Marani, Roundthwaite and Dick, Architects
- Builders: Gateway Building and Supply Ltd.

The Canada Games Complex was constructed in 1981 to host the aquatic events of the 1981 Canada Summer Games in Thunder Bay, Ontario. It is run by the City of Thunder Bay and its features include a swimming pool, indoor fitness areas, a fitness testing area, and an indoor running track. The facility has been open to the public since the end of the Summer Games in 1981, and since that time has seen many renovations and additions, including a café, water slide, and expansions to its fitness areas. It accommodates approximately 450,000 visitors every year.

Located near the entrance to the complex is a twisting wooden sculpture titled "Vertere". It was created in 1981 by Paul Epp of Cambridge, Ontario. It depicts a twisting motion, which is common in sports.

== Facilities ==
The main feature is the pool. It is 77 metres (253 ft) long, and divided by two bulkheads. Water depth ranges from 0.83 metres (2.7 ft) at the shallow end to 4.94 metres (16.2 ft) at the deep end. The complex also features a "Swirlpool", which features hydrotherapy jets.

The complex has wide pool decks to accommodate badminton, table tennis, a children's play area, various exercise equipment and a social area. Off the pool deck are permanent bleachers with a capacity of 800 people.

The diving tower has platforms located at 5 metres (16 ft), 7.5 metres (25 ft) and 10 metres (33 ft). It also includes two 3 metres (9.8 ft) and one 1 metre (3.3 ft) springboard. The diving tower also features the "Thunderslide", a 73 metres (240 ft) long water slide.

The complex features a 2,400 square feet (220 m^{2}) weight room as well as three "Multi-training Areas" which include elliptical trainers, ergometers, exercise bikes, Stairmasters, treadmills, a climbing wall, and Universal Gym Equipment. One of the areas also features televisions that users can watch while exercising. A 280 metres (920 ft) running track is located on the second level, overlooking the pool area.

Also included is a fitness testing area, four squash courts, and two multi-purpose rooms. In addition to fitness and swimming the complex also provides babysitting facilities, locker rooms, and aerobic classes. The games complex also features a variety of accessibility features for handicapped and disabled persons.

== See also ==
- Port Arthur Stadium
- Thunder Bay Community Auditorium
- Canada Games Park
