= Thunder Bay Soroptimist International Friendship Garden =

Park in Ontario, Canada

Soroptimist International Friendship Garden
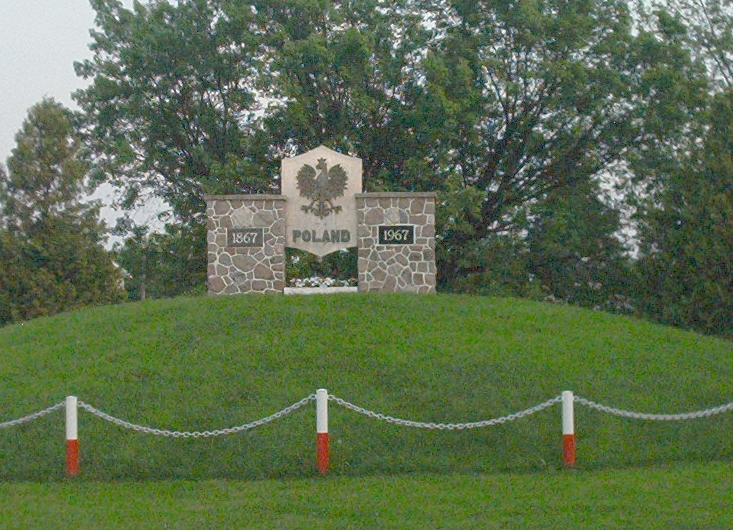
- The monument representing Poland
- Interactive map of Soroptimist International Friendship Garden
- Type: Public Garden
- Location: Thunder Bay, Ontario, Canada
- Coordinates: 48°23′06″N 89°15′55″W
- Area: 6.1 hectares (15 acres)
- Created: 1967
- Operator: Soroptimist Garden Committee
- Public transit: Thunder Bay Transit 10

The Thunder Bay Soroptimist International Friendship Garden is a city park located in the south end of Thunder Bay, Ontario, Canada. The park is located at the south end of Chapples Park, at the corners of Victoria Avenue and Hyde Park Avenue.

The Friendship Garden was organised in 1967 as a Centennial gift by the Soroptimist Club of Fort William-Port Arthur. The garden showcases unique monuments representing eighteen ethnic groups in the Thunder Bay area, laid out in a 15-acre (61,000 m^{2}) garden featuring man made ponds, floral displays, picnic tables, benches and walking trails.

== Groups represented in the park ==
- Canadian
- Chinese
- Croatian
- Dutch
- Filipino
- Finnish
- German
- Greek
- Hungarian
- Indian
- Italian
- Lithuanian
- Polish
- Portuguese
- Scottish
- Slovakian
- Slovenian
- Ukrainian
