= Centennial Park (Thunder Bay) =

Municipal park in Thunder Bay, Ontario

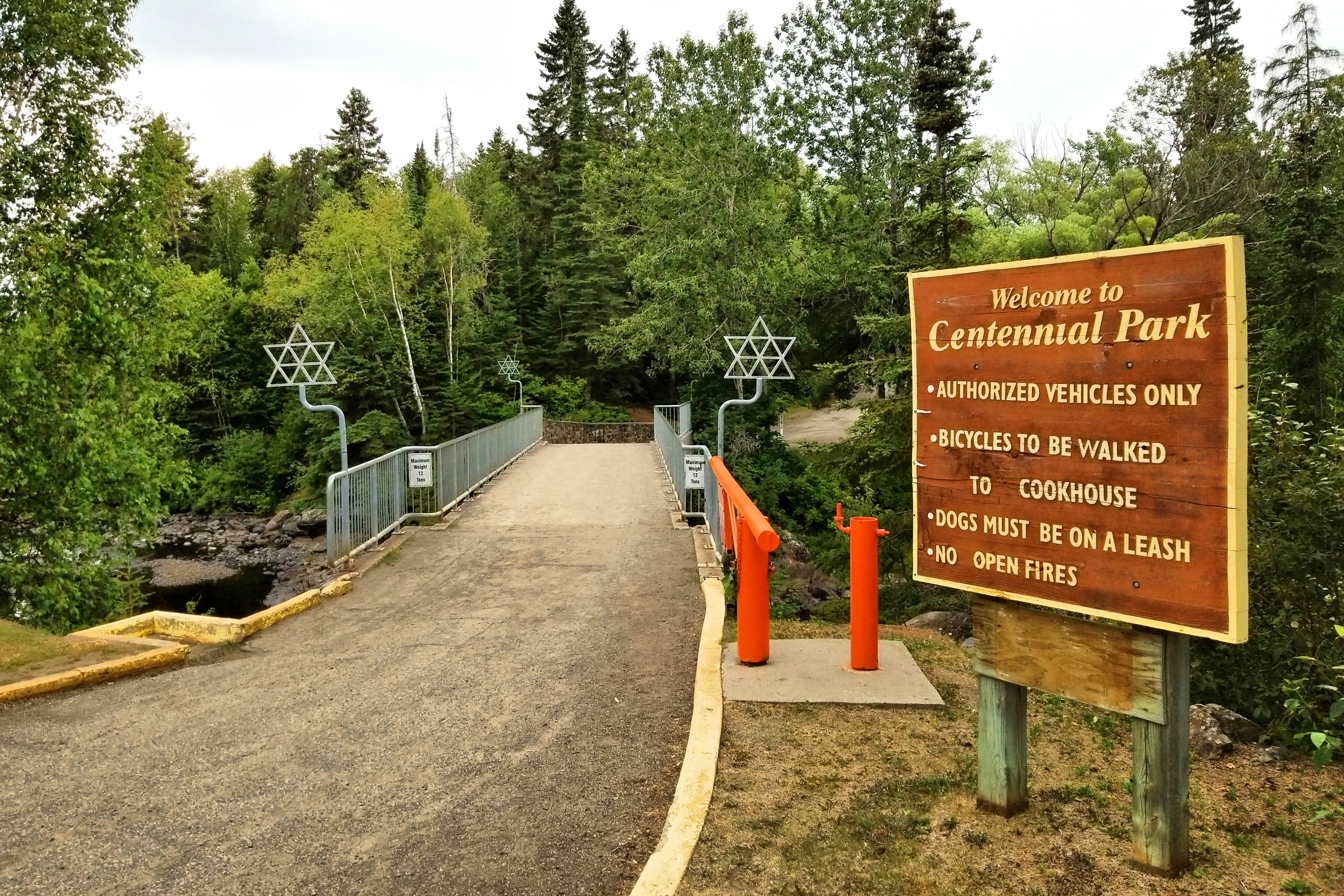
- Interactive map of Centennial Park
- Type: Public park
- Location: Thunder Bay, Ontario, Canada
- Coordinates: 48°28′38″N 89°11′38″W
- Created: 1967
- Operator: City of Thunder Bay

Developed in 1967, Centennial Park is a large park area that follows the shores of the rocky Current River in the north end of Thunder Bay, Ontario. The park was built to represent the history of logging in Port Arthur (Now part of Thunder Bay). The park features many replicas of the equipment and living conditions on logging camps in the early 20th century. The park also features recreational facilities, such as recreation trails, an animal farm, and a toboggan hill.

The park features a family and children's train ride called the 'Muskeg Express' which had previously been used by the Newaygo Timber Company to transport workers and supplies in its Hearst area operations.

== Activities ==
- 1910 Logging Camp Re-creation
- Animal Farm
- Recreation trails
- Craft Shop and lodge
- Children's Playground
- "Ride the Muskeg Express Train"
- Picnic area

== Hours of operation ==
- Logging Camp Mid June until September Long Weekend 8:00am–10:00pm
- Park and Farm open all year
- Train Ride Wednesday to Sunday 12:00pm–4:00pm (unavailable in the winter)

== Admission ==
- Entering and exploring the park is free
- Muskeg Express Train:
  - Ages 5 and under: Free
  - Ages 6 to 12: $1.00
  - Ages 12 and up: $2.50
