= Thunder Bay Historical Museum =

Museum in Ontario, Canada

Coordinates: 48°22′57″N 89°14′40″W

Thunder Bay Museum
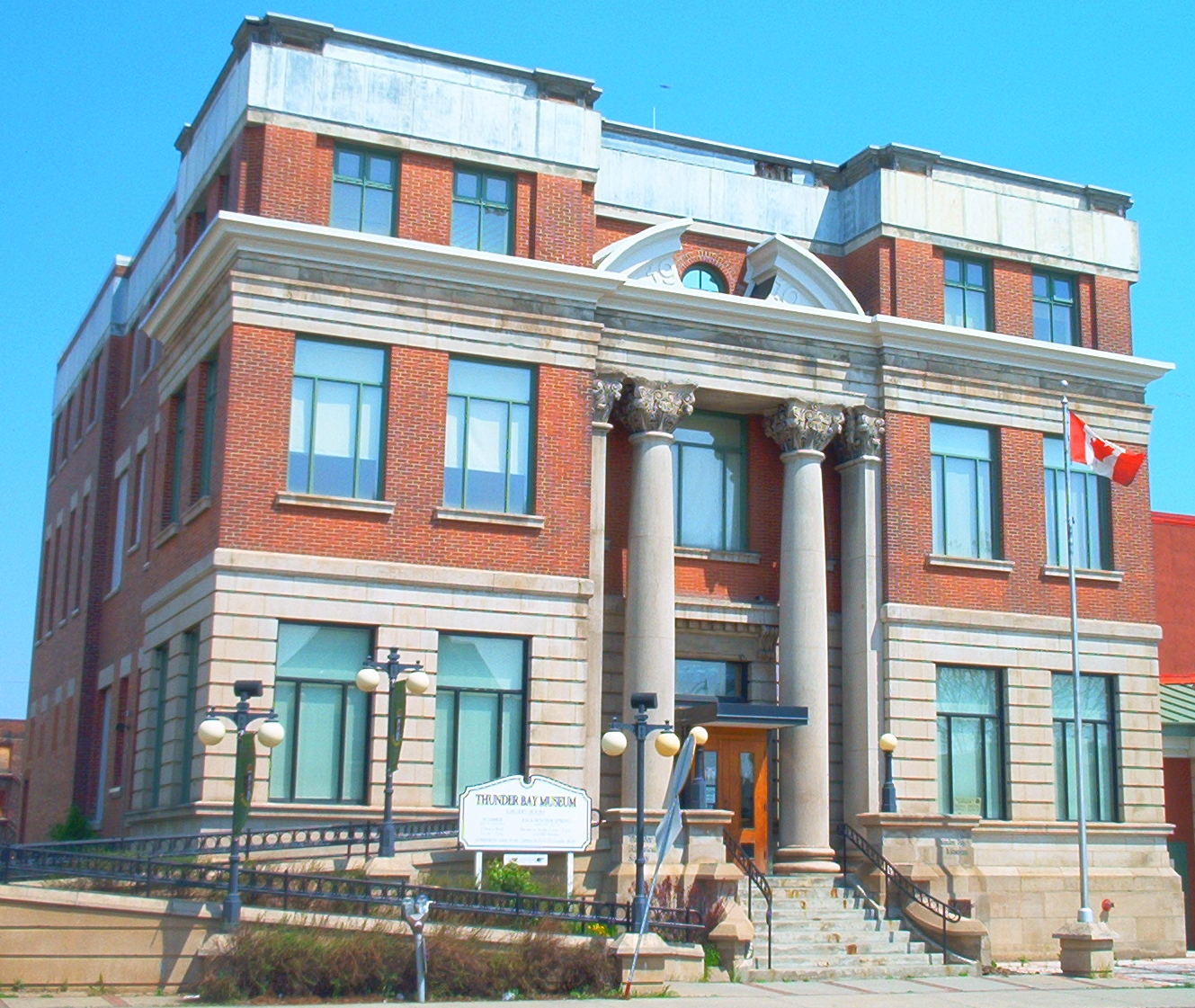
- Established: 1908
- Location: 425 Donald Street East; Thunder Bay, Ontario
- Executive director: Scott Bradley
- Curator: Michael deJong
- Public transit access: Thunder Bay Transit via City Hall Terminal 1 3M 8 10 12 14 16 18 4 (limited)
- Website: www.thunderbaymuseum.com/

The Thunder Bay Museum is located in Thunder Bay, Ontario. It is operated by The Thunder Bay Historical Museum Society, incorporated in 1972 as the successor to the Thunder Bay Historical Society.

The Museum is affiliated with the Canadian Museums Association, the Canadian Heritage Information Network, the Ontario Historical Society, and Virtual Museum of Canada.

== History ==
The Thunder Bay Historical Society was founded October 2, 1908 at the instance of Barlow Cumberland, president of the Ontario Historical Society. Peter McKellar served as president of the Thunder Bay Historical Society from 1908 to 1923.

Since 1994 the museum has been housed in the former Fort William police station and court house near Thunder Bay City Hall. The three-storey building, designed by architect Robert Mason, was erected in 1910 and is an example of Classical Revival architecture, with its two large Corinthian columns and pilasters. Fund raising is under way to restore the cornice and other missing architectural elements. The interior of the building has been treated with complete renovations since 1994, including an overhaul of its HVAC system and the addition of a wheelchair ramp. An annex was enlarged and converted to a storage area for the collection. Recently a visible storage gallery was built in front of the annex to display vehicles and other large items in the museum's collection.

== Collection ==
The first floor gallery features permanent exhibits on various aspects of local history. The second floor gallery is known as the James Murphy Room and is dedicated to meetings and programming, such as birthday parties and themed march & summer break camps for children. The third floor gallery features military and music exhibits, local and traveling exhibit space as well as a multipurpose room available for rentals.

The museum collects objects of regional interest, such as dolls, pictures and furniture, and its collection includes a firetruck. The archives has 130 metres of linear records, 1900 maps and plans, 150,000 photographic images and a 2200 volume library.

== Program ==
The Society produces an annual peer-reviewed journal entitled Papers & Records. It is also publishes a number of books annually on a variety of local and regional interest.

== Arms ==
Coat of arms of the Thunder Bay Historical Museum Society

Notes
Granted 15 October 2006.
Crest
An open book Argent bound Purpure in front of a demi-compass rose Or.
Escutcheon
Purpure on a pale of birchbark Proper between two keys wards in base Or an hourglass Proper its stand Purpure.
Motto
Learning From History
Badge
An hourglass as in the Arms encircled by a wreath of mountain maple leaves and nodding trillium flowers Proper.
