= Lomond River (Ontario) =

- Location of the mouth of the Lomond River in Ontario

Location
- Country: Canada
- Province: Ontario
- Region: Northwestern Ontario
- District: Thunder Bay

Physical characteristics
- Source: Loch Lomond
  - coordinates: 48°16′08″N 89°17′34″W
  - elevation: 268 m (879 ft)
- Mouth: Lake Superior
  - coordinates: 48°15′59″N 89°15′24″W
  - elevation: 183 m (600 ft)
- Length: 3.4 km (2.1 mi)

Basin features
- River system: Great Lakes Basin

The Lomond River is a river in the Fort William First Nation and the Municipality of Neebing in Thunder Bay District in Northwestern Ontario, Canada. The river is part of the Great Lakes Basin, and flows from Loch Lomond through a small intermediate lake to Lake Superior.

== Sources ==
- Map 13 (PDF) (Map). 1 : 1,600,000. Official road map of Ontario. Ministry of Transportation of Ontario. 2014.
- Restructured municipalities - Ontario map #1 (Map). Restructuring Maps of Ontario. Ontario Ministry of Municipal Affairs and Housing. 2006.
