= The Walleye =

Magazine published in Ontario, Canada

- Frequency: Monthly
- Founded: 2010
- First issue: July 2010
- Country: Canada
- Based in: Thunder Bay, Ontario, Canada
- Language: English
- Website: thewalleye.ca
- OCLC: 1065407356

The Walleye is a free arts and culture magazine published in Thunder Bay, Ontario.

It was founded in 2010, with the first issue released July 2010. The initial owners were Superior Outdoors Inc, and first editor-in-chief Darren McChristie. In 2024, The Walleye was purchased by employees Adrian Lysenko, Alaina Linklater, and Sidney Ulakovic.

The magazine is distributed monthly and for free in Thunder Bay and surrounding communities, including northern Minnesota.
