= Flag of Thunder Bay =

Thunder Bay
- Proportion: 1:2
- Designed by: Cliff Redden

The flag of Thunder Bay, Ontario, Canada was adopted in 1972. The twin cities of Fort William and Port Arthur amalgamated in 1970, and mayor Saul Laskin wanted to promote the new city by having a distinctive flag. The city held a contest, which was won by Cliff Redden.

The flag has a 1:2 ratio, and depicts a golden sky from the rising sun behind the Sleeping Giant, which sits in the blue waters of Lake Superior. The sun is represented by a red maple leaf, a symbol of Canada. Green and gold are Thunder Bay's city colours.
