= Centennial Botanical Conservatory =

Facility in Ontario, Canada

Thunder Bay Centennial Botanical Conservatory
- Interactive map of Thunder Bay Centennial Botanical Conservatory
- Type: Conservatory
- Location: Thunder Bay, Ontario, Canada
- Coordinates: 48.3909°N 89.2604°W
- Created: 1965
- Operator: City of Thunder Bay

The Centennial Botanical Conservatory in Thunder Bay, Ontario is located in the city's south end. It was built in 1965 and opened to the public in 1967 as a Centennial Project to commemorate the Canadian Centennial. The conservatory houses various varieties of tropical plants, flowers, trees and shrubs in its main greenhouse, a cactus room, and a room with seasonal displays. The facility includes paths and benches and a wishing well and is open to the public, year round free of charge. The conservatory can be booked for groups or photo sessions.

== History ==
The Centennial Conservatory (also known as the Centennial Botanical Conservatory or the Thunder Bay Conservatory) is a commemorative Centennial Project donated to the citizens of Fort William as their legacy. Construction started in 1965 and was for the most part completed in 1966 leaving one year for seeding and growing. It was finally opened to the public on November 10, 1967. On November 18, 1967, the official opening ceremony was held.

In 1968, one year after the Centennial Conservatory opened to the public, a large banana plant was donated by the Canadian Daughters Assembly 34.

The conservatory was closed temporarily in February 2012 due to glass falling from the ceiling.

Renovations to the Conservatory were conducted in 3 phases between 2020 and 2026.

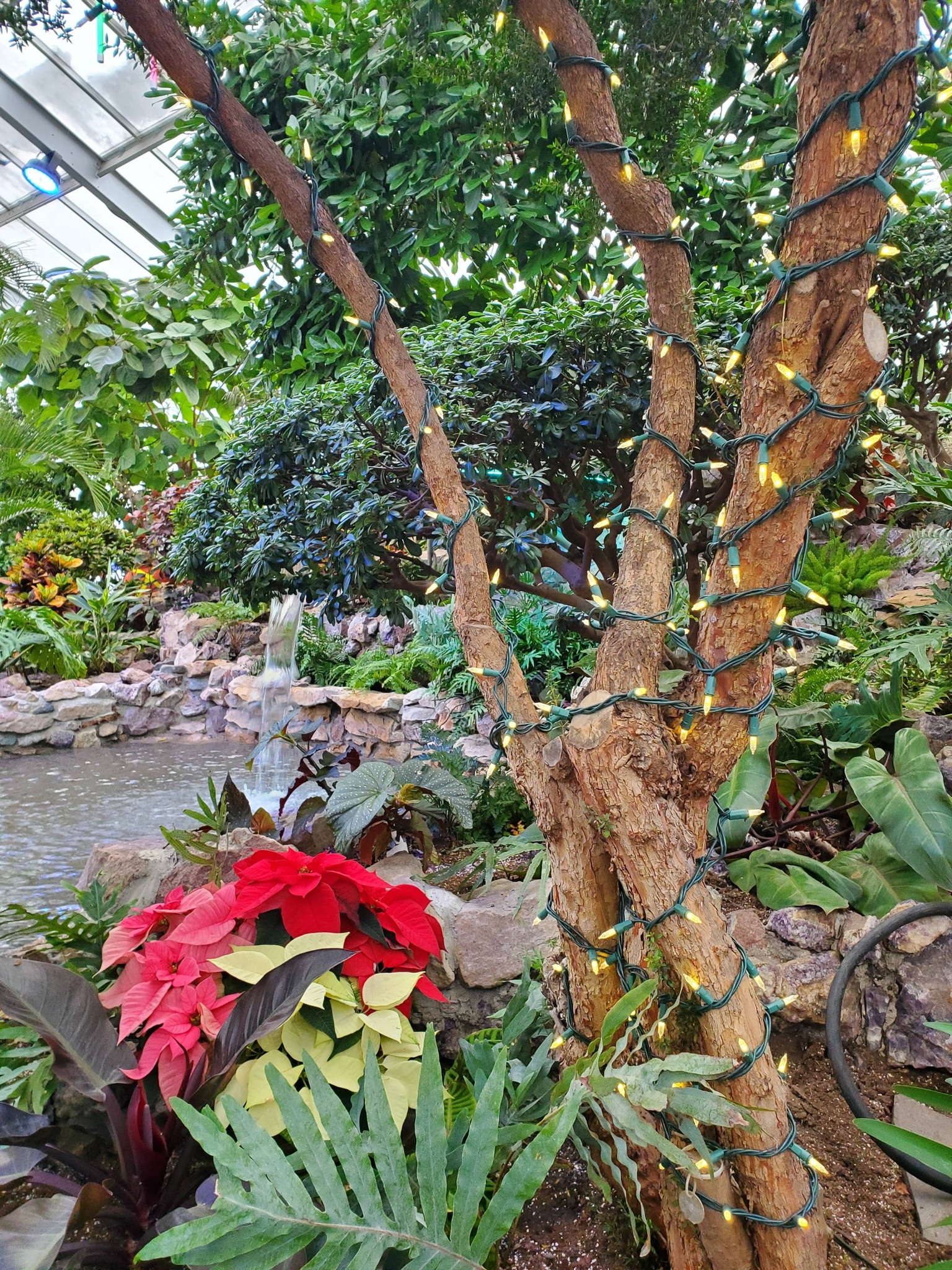
Photograph taken inside the Centennial Botanical Conservatory in Thunder Bay, decorated for the holidays, December 2025.
