= Thunder Bay Community Auditorium =

The Auditorium
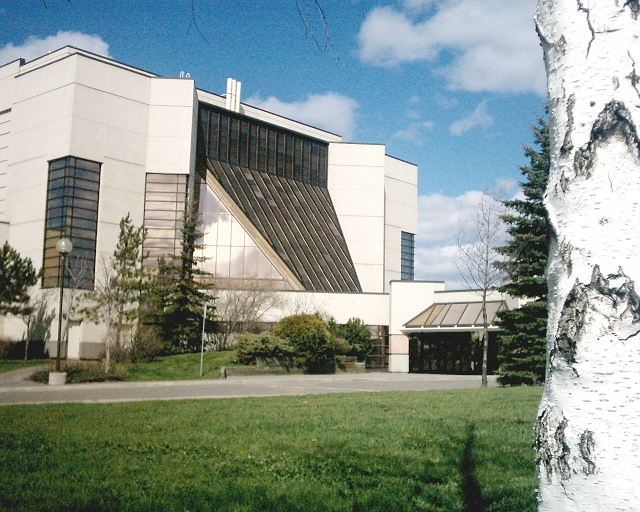
- Interactive map of The Auditorium
- Address: 1 Paul Shaffer Drive; Thunder Bay, Ontario; Canada
- Coordinates: 48.42252°N 89.24142°W
- Owner: City of Thunder Bay
- Capacity: 1,511
- Public transit: Thunder Bay Transit 15
- Parking: 1000 spaces

Construction
- Opened: October 16, 1985

Website
- http://www.tbca.com/

The Auditorium is a 1,511 seat performance arts centre, located in Thunder Bay, Ontario. It opened on October 16, 1985 and is home to the Thunder Bay Symphony Orchestra. The Community Auditorium hosts 150,000 patrons annually.

It has a 40' by 50' permanent stage, a 70' by 39' proscenium, 8 dressing rooms, 52 lines, 2x 400 A 120 V/208 V electrical, 3 meeting rooms, a 450-person banquet capacity, and parking for 1000 vehicles. The facility features a wide variety of state-of-the-art equipment, including a ceiling that can be lowered or raised and acoustic draperies which can be adjusted to modify the reverberance in the auditorium.

Lakehead University (Thunder Bay campus), Confederation College (Thunder Bay), and several local high schools often host graduation ceremonies at this auditorium in May and June.

The Auditorium was initially a City-funded and -managed facility: in 2007, for example, the facility received $475,000 annually from the City of Thunder Bay, and by 2022, typically $750,000 per year. The formal relationship between the Auditorium and the City government was changed in 2022, to allow the Auditorium to operate more independently. As a not-for-profit organization, the Auditorium makes use of fundraising and grant funding as well as ticket sales for events.

== Name of the Auditorium ==
In February 2007, in an effort to decrease the facility's impact on taxpayers, the Community Auditorium issued an expression of interest for an organization or individual to become a naming sponsor. Two potential sponsors — Shaw Communications and TBayTel — initially expressed interest, but did not follow up on it by the March 27, 2008 deadline, and the name remained Thunder Bay Community Auditorium.

In October 2026, the Thunder Bay Community Auditorium officially rebranded as The Auditorium.
