= Current River (Ontario) =

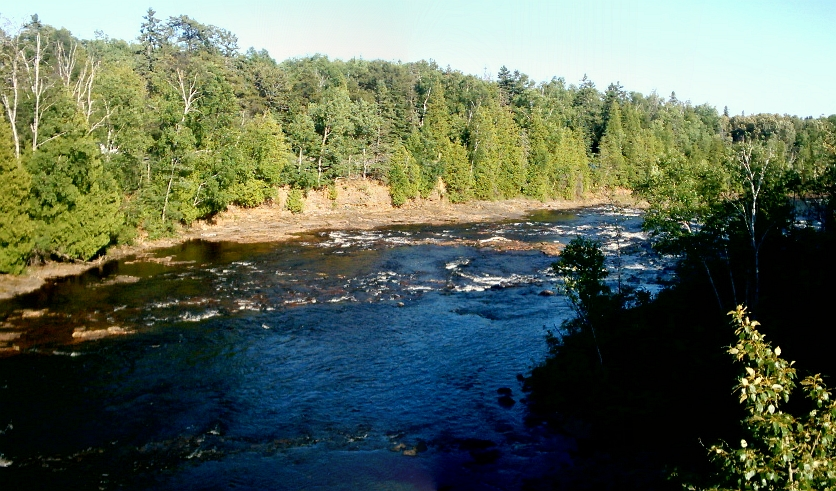
- Current River seen from the Black Bay Bridge

- Location of the mouth of the Current River in Ontario
- Etymology: from the French "Rivière aux courants"

Location
- Country: Canada
- Province: Ontario
- Region: Northwestern Ontario
- District: Thunder Bay

Physical characteristics
- Source: Current Lake
  - coordinates: 48°46′36″N 88°56′47″W
  - elevation: 476 m (1,562 ft)
- Mouth: Thunder Bay, Lake Superior
  - coordinates: 48°27′08″N 89°11′02″W
  - elevation: 180 m (590 ft)

Basin features
- River system: Great Lakes Basin
- Tributaries
  - left: North Current River

The Current River is a river in the City of Thunder Bay and Unorganized Thunder Bay District in Thunder Bay District, Northwestern Ontario, Canada. The river is in the Great Lakes Basin and is a tributary of Lake Superior. The river's name comes from the French "Rivière aux courants", referring to the river's currents.

== Course ==
The Current River begins at Current Lake in Unorganized Thunder Bay District and flows northwest, then turns southeast, passing out of Ray Lake over a dam, then under Ontario Highway 527 and reaches Onion Lake. It continues southwest, passes into geographic Gorham Township, flows past the community of Stepstone, and turns southeast before entering the City of Thunder Bay. It takes in the left tributary North Current River, turns south, passes under Ontario Highway 17, then flows through Boulevard Lake and over Boulevard Lake Dam, and flows into Thunder Bay on Lake Superior.

== History ==
The river's name is the English version of the name given it by early French explorers: "Rivière aux courants", referring to the river's currents. In 1859 Lindsay Russell, Surveyor-General for Canada, followed the river from its mouth in Lake Superior towards its source, reporting that:

"Current River, having a general course of north, winds about among steep, rocky hills, which sometimes rise straight up from its edge; from the top of one of these, about 6 miles from its mouth, we could see its course for a long distance through an exceedingly rough country. It is full of rapids and falls pouring through clefts of up-heaved granite and slate. Opposite the second mile of the line it passes through slate, but higher up, granite."

Two other sizable rivers and a creek — the Neebing River, the McIntyre River and McVicar's Creek — run between Current River and the Kaministiquia River to the south, but in 1858 neither of these two rivers were of sufficient interest to be identified by name. From the vantage point of Fort William, the Neebing River was referred to as "First River" and the McIntyre continued for some time to be known as "Second River." Sometimes, from the vantage point of Prince Arthur's Landing, the names were reversed, the McIntyre being the First River and the Neebing River the Second River.

Early references to development along the Current River include mention of John McKenzie's acquisition of land along it in 1857, and William Petit Trowbridge's 400 acre (162 hectare) purchase of patented mineral lands at the river's mouth in 1865. About 1867 brothers Peter, John and Donald McKellar discovered silver deposits near the river, and their Thunder Bay Silver Mining Co. operated near its mouth from 1866 to 1870, when fire destroyed the buildings. The Duncan-Shuniah Mine also operated in this area from 1867 to 1881. An 1875 editorial in Prince Arthur Landing's satirical newspaper Thunderbolt mentions (facetiously) factories and mills on the Current River, but there was no industrial activity on the river until the 20th century.

In 1901 a dam was built near the mouth of the river, resulting in flooding which created an artificial lake known as Boulevard Lake. The land around the lake was developed as a municipal park. Industry has continued to build at the mouth of the river—predominantly pulp, wood and newsprint mills, along with rail and lake shipping facilities—but numerous parklands follow it inland. Eventually it disappears into roadless wilderness, reappearing from time to time near roadsides and at dams constructed along its course.

== Tributaries ==
- Savigny Creek (left)
- North Current River (left)
- Ferguson Creek (right)
- Bentley Creek (left)
- Wasp Creek (left)
- Onion Lake
  - Barnum Creek (right)
- Aberdeen Creek (right)
- Escape Creek (left)
- Spoon Creek (right)
- Orchid Creek (left)

== See also ==
- Current River Neighbourhood
- List of Ontario rivers

== Sources ==
- Map 13 (PDF) (Map). 1 : 1,600,000. Official road map of Ontario. Ministry of Transportation of Ontario. 2010-01-01.
- Restructured municipalities - Ontario map #2 (Map). Restructuring Maps of Ontario. Ontario Ministry of Municipal Affairs and Housing. 2006. Archived from the original on 2014-04-10.
