= Bare Point Water Treatment Plant =

Municipal water treatment facility

Coordinates: 48°26′28″N 89°09′27″W

The Bare Point Water Treatment Plant is the primary water filtration plant in the city of Thunder Bay, Ontario, drawing 113.6 million litres (25 million gallons) from Lake Superior per day. The plant uses a Zeeweed 1000 Version 3 Ultra-Filtration system, the first of its kind in the world, which reduces the need for harmful chemicals. The Zeeweed system uses long thin straws that suck up water then force it through the small holes of a membrane to filter out particles.

The Bare Point plant is located on the shore of Thunder Bay, at the northeastern corner of Thunder Bay's city limits, accessible off Lakeshore Drive. It was first constructed in 1903 and expanded in 1978 and again in 2007 to its current capacity. The plant's treatment method uses pre-chlorination, then coagulation-flocculation followed by membrane ultrafiltration and post chlorine disinfection.
