= Fort William Stadium =

Stadium in Thunder Bay, Ontario

Coordinates: 48°23′12″N 89°15′49″W

- Interactive map of Fort William Stadium
- Location: 300 Legion Track Drive, Thunder Bay, Ontario, Canada
- Owner: City of Thunder Bay
- Capacity: 3,500
- Surface: Field Turf
- Public transit: Thunder Bay Transit 10

Tenants
- SSSAA (Football, Soccer, Track and Field); Thunder Bay Minor Football Association; Thunder Bay Chill (USL2) (2015-Present)

Fort William Stadium is a soccer, football, and track and field stadium in Thunder Bay, Ontario, and is part of the Royal Canadian Legion Sports Complex. It has a seating capacity of 3,500. Many upgrades have been made to the complex, including scoreboard, lights and field size.
