= Marina Park (Thunder Bay) =

Park in Thunder Bay, Ontario, Canada

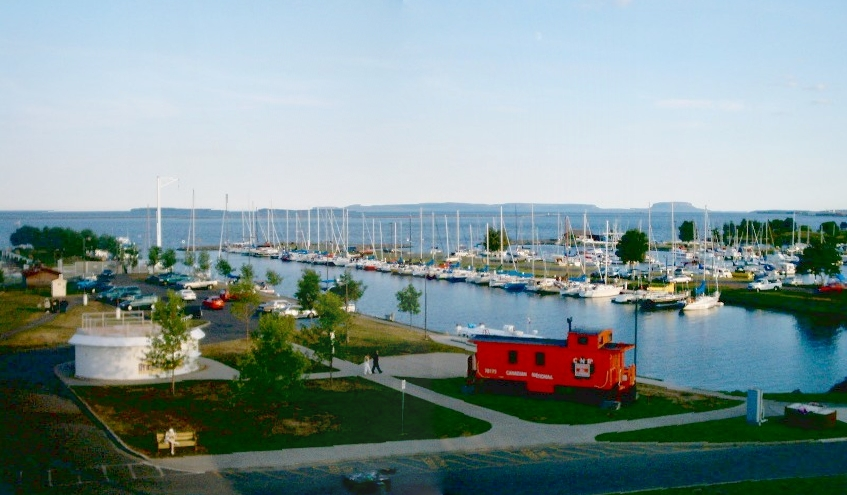
- The boat docks and Lake Superior
- Interactive map of Marina Park
- Type: Marina, public park
- Location: Thunder Bay, Ontario, Canada
- Coordinates: 48.4343°N 89.2166°W
- Area: Port Arthur, Ontario
- Operator: City of Thunder Bay
- Status: Completed
- Public transit: Thunder Bay Transit via Waterfront Terminal 1 2 3C 3J 3M 7 9 11 13 17

Marina Park is a local waterfront park and marina located on the shores of Lake Superior in Thunder Bay, Ontario. The park is located in the city's north end near the downtown north core. Aside from pleasure craft docks and a fueling facility, the park also has walking paths and a boardwalk, playground equipment, picnic tables, a Mariner's Monument and the historic CN Rail Station (now home to gift shops and ice-cream parlor, restaurant and other amenities).

The marina, also known as "Prince Arthur's Landing," is in the first phase of a 130 million dollar upgrade. This is a private–public coalition to make the park tourist friendly and provide a new tax base for the city. The private company is in the process of building two seven-story condos, an art gallery and a hotel with a water park onto the marina. The current area is being infilled by an average of 3 acres (12,000 m^{2}) between each pier to create enough room for the new buildings. One feature that is the mainstay for the public half of the construction is a splash pad–rink which will be accessible all year long by tourists and the public. The project has continued throughout the winter season and has completed the infill and other basic features. Tenders are currently out to start the construction of the public buildings and the condo–hotel should not be far behind. The project was funded by all levels of government through many different stimulus projects. Construction is to be completed in the fall of 2010 with minor landscaping being finished in 2011. Phase 2 is currently in the design phases which will see the area expanded onto an old industrial area. This area will hold a cruise ship docking and possibly a convention center and create a large area which will be accessible to everyone in the public. The costs are not yet known for a project like this. This project is expected to start in 2011 or 2012 and is part of a much larger project to eventually develop all 52 km of the city's waterfront.

The park also hosts numerous events during the summer season, including the "Summer in the Parks" concert series, the Thunder Bay Blues Festival, kite festival, Canada Day celebrations and many other annual events. Many celebrations are held on the waterfront and it is the mainstay for the north core.

== Prince Arthur's Landing waterfront district ==
The Prince Arthur's Landing waterfront district is a mixed-used waterfront redevelopment district incorporating the city's Marina Park, with parkland and trails, a sculpture garden, restored heritage buildings and a future hotel. Structures include the Baggage Building Arts Centre public gallery, a restored circa-1900 building, the Water Garden Pavilion, a skateboard park, running and cycling trails, as well as public art. Initiated in 2006, the district takes its name from the former village of Prince Arthur's Landing, which was renamed as Port Arthur in 1883.
