= Thunder Bay =

- City (single-tier)
- City of Thunder Bay
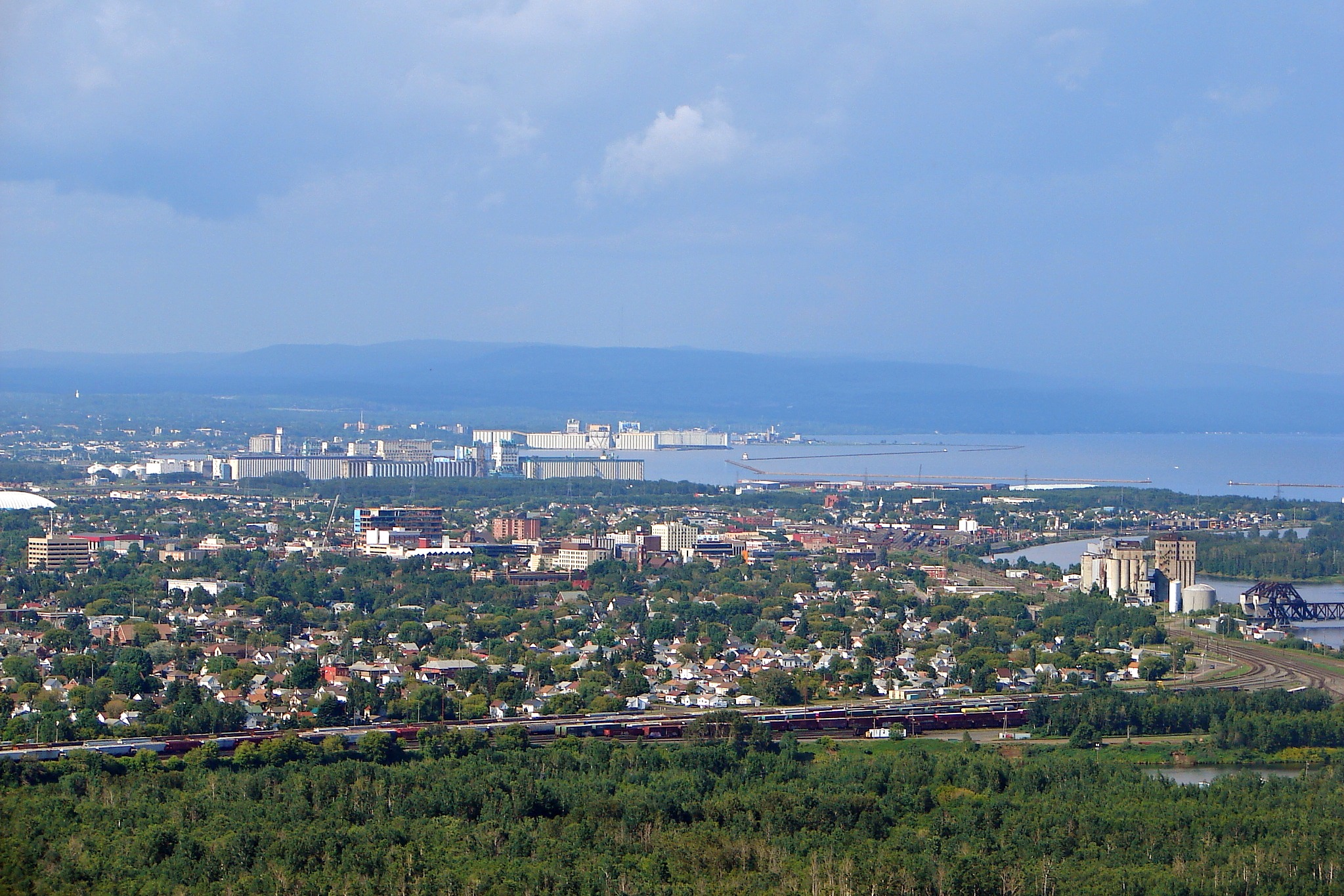
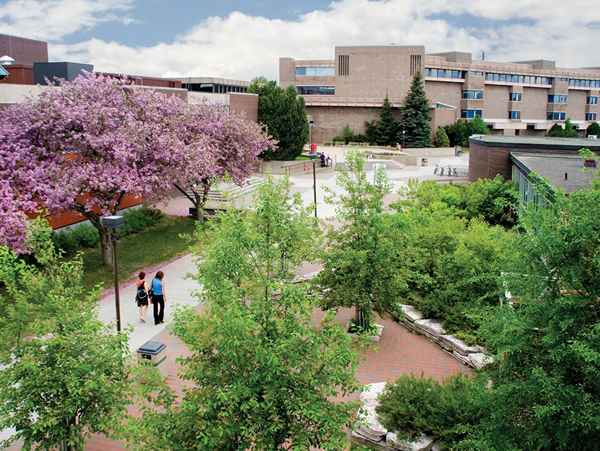
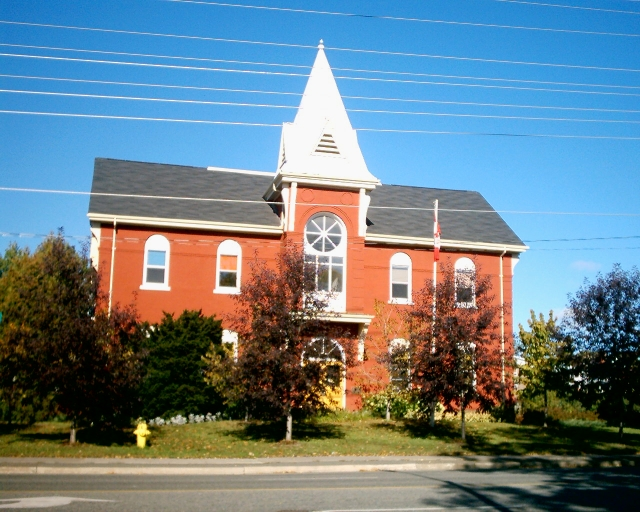
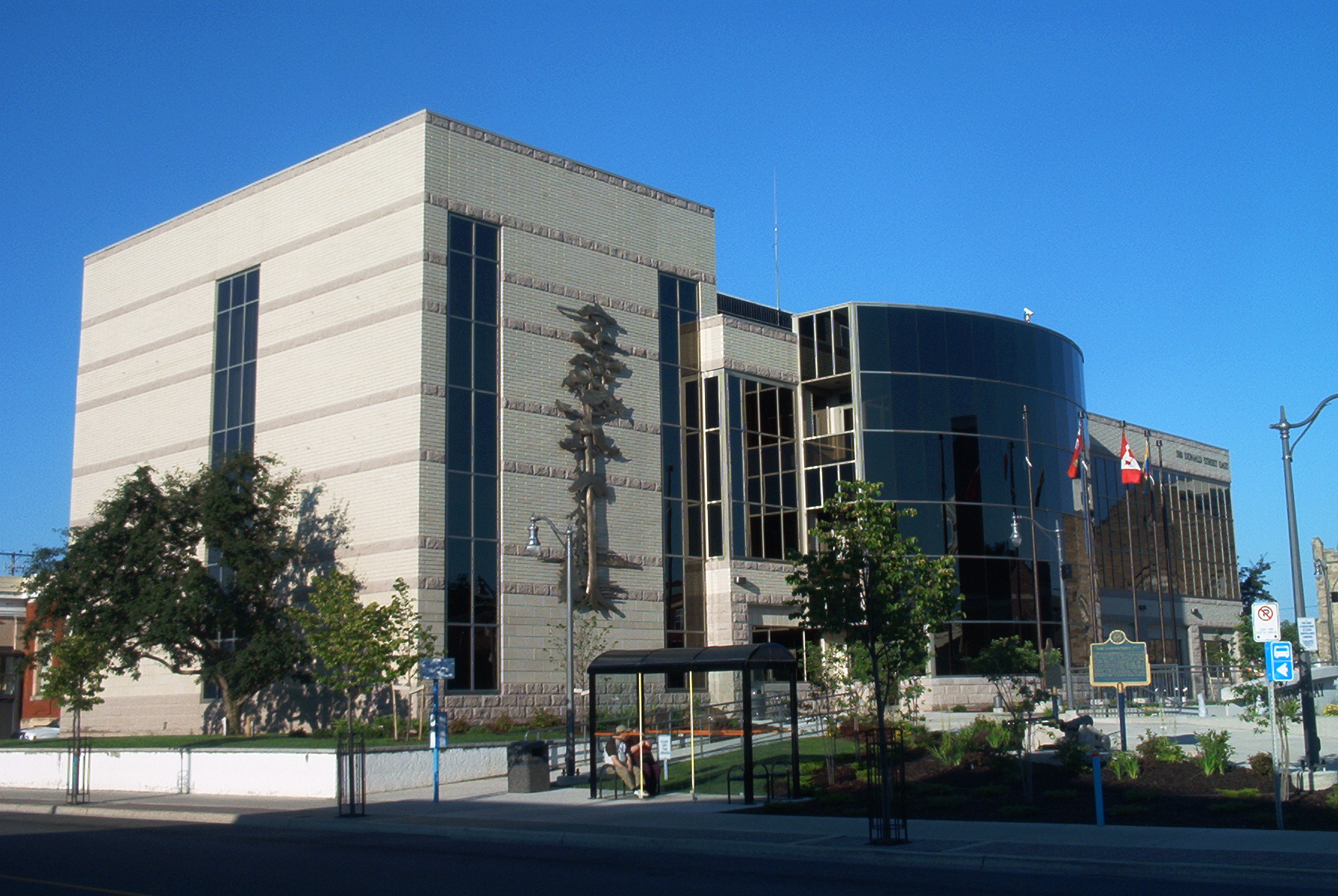
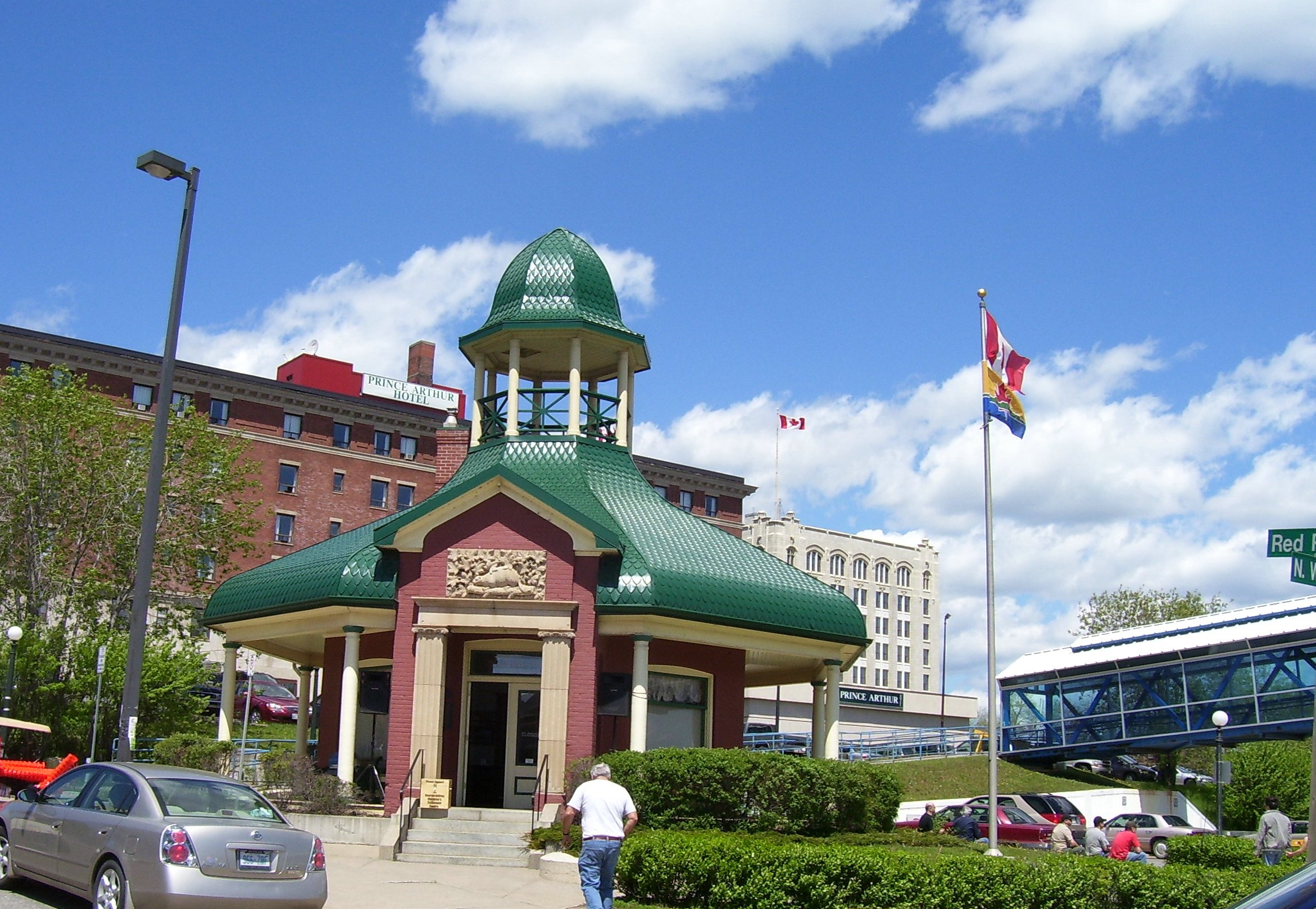
- From top, left to right: view from Mount McKay, Lakehead University, Magnus Theatre, City Hall, Tourist Pagoda

- Flag Coat of arms Logo
- Nicknames: "Canada's Gateway to the West", "T-Bay", "Lakehead" or "The Lakehead"
- Motto: Superior by Nature / The Gateway to the West
- Location of Thunder Bay
- Coordinates: 48°22′56″N 89°14′46″W
- Country: Canada
- Province: Ontario
- District: Thunder Bay
- CMA: Thunder Bay
- Settled: 1683 as Fort Caministigoyan
- Amalgamation: 1 January 1970
- Electoral Districts Federal: Thunder Bay—Superior North/Thunder Bay—Rainy River
- Provincial: Thunder Bay—Superior North/Thunder Bay—Atikokan

Government
  - Type: Municipal Government
  - Mayor: Moe Comuzzi
  - City manager: John Collin
  - Governing Body: Thunder Bay City Council
  - MPs: Patty Hajdu (Liberal); Marcus Powlowski (Liberal)
  - MPPs: Lise Vaugeois (ONDP); Kevin Holland (Progressive Conservative Party of Ontario)

Area
  - City (single-tier): 447.5 km^{2} (172.8 sq mi)
  - Land: 328.24 km^{2} (126.73 sq mi)
  - Water: 119.0 km^{2} (45.9 sq mi) 26.6%
  - Urban: 179.38 km^{2} (69.26 sq mi)
  - Metro: 2,556.37 km^{2} (987.02 sq mi)
- Elevation: 199 m (653 ft)

Population (2021)
  - City (single-tier): 108,843 (51st)
  - Density: 332.1/km^{2} (860/sq mi)
  - Urban: 95,266 (36th)
  - Urban density: 1,253/km^{2} (3,250/sq mi)
  - Metro: 123,258 (34th)
  - Metro density: 48.3/km^{2} (125/sq mi)
- Demonym: Thunder Bayer

Gross Metropolitan Product
  - Thunder Bay CMA: CA$6.2 billion (2020)
- Time zone: UTC−05:00 (EST)
  - Summer (DST): UTC−04:00 (EDT)
- Forward sortation area: P7A to P7G, P7J to P7K
- Area code: 807
- NTS Map: 52A6 Thunder Bay
- GNBC Code: FCWFX
- Website: thunderbay.ca

Thunder Bay is a city in and the seat of Thunder Bay District, Ontario, Canada. It is the most populous municipality in Northwestern Ontario and the second most populous (after Greater Sudbury) municipality in Northern Ontario. Its population is 108,843 according to the 2021 Canadian census.

Located on Lake Superior, the census metropolitan area of Thunder Bay has a population of 123,258. It consists of the city of Thunder Bay, the municipalities of Oliver Paipoonge and Neebing, the townships of Shuniah, Conmee, O'Connor, and Gillies, and the Fort William First Nation.

European settlement in the region began in the late 17th century with a French fur trading outpost on the banks of the Kaministiquia River. It grew into an important transportation hub with its port forming an important link in the shipping of grain and other products from western Canada, through the Great Lakes and the Saint Lawrence Seaway, to the east coast. Forestry and manufacturing played important roles in the city's economy. They have declined in recent years, but have been replaced by a "knowledge economy" based on medical research and education. Thunder Bay is the site of the Thunder Bay Regional Health Research Institute.

On 1 January 1970, the City of Thunder Bay was formed through the merger of the cities of Fort William, Port Arthur, and the geographic townships of Neebing and McIntyre. The city takes this name from the immense Thunder Bay at the head of Lake Superior, known on 18th-century French maps as Baie du Tonnerre (Bay of Thunder). The city is often referred to as the "Lakehead", or "Canadian Lakehead", because of its location at the end of Great Lakes navigation on the Canadian side of the border.

== History ==
=== Before 1900 ===
Various Anishinaabe peoples such as the Ojibwa are indigenous to the Thunder Bay Area. European settlement at Thunder Bay began with two French fur trading posts (in 1683 and 1717) which were subsequently abandoned (see Fort William, Ontario). In 1803, the Montreal-based North West Company established Fort William as its mid-continent entrepôt.

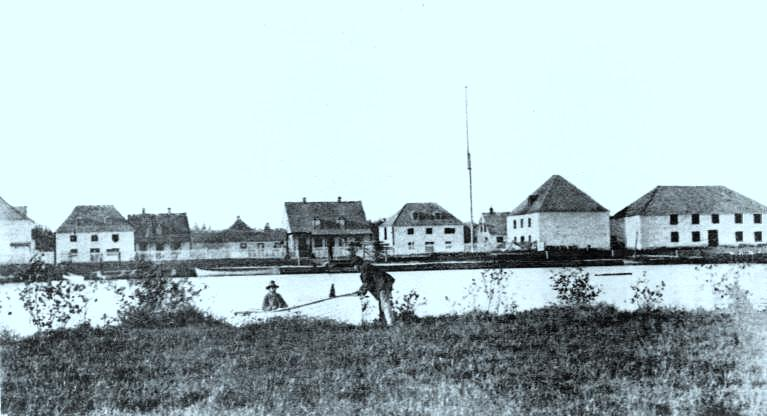
Fort William in 1865

By the 1850s, the Province of Canada began to take an interest in its western extremity. The discovery of copper in the Keweenaw Peninsula of Michigan had prompted a national interest in potential mining locations on the Canadian shores of Lake Superior. In 1849, French-speaking Jesuits established the Mission de l'Immaculée-Conception (Mission of the Immaculate Conception) on the Kaministiquia to evangelize the Ojibwe. The Province of Canada negotiated the Robinson Treaty in 1850 with the Ojibwa of Lake Superior. As a result, an Indian reserve was set aside for them south of the Kaministiquia River.

Another settlement developed a few miles to the north of Fort William after construction by the federal Department of Public Works of a road connecting Lake Superior with the Red River Colony. The work was directed by Simon James Dawson (see Port Arthur, Ontario). This public works depot or construction headquarters acquired its first name in May 1870 when Colonel Garnet Wolseley named it Prince Arthur's Landing. It was renamed Port Arthur by the Canadian Pacific Railway (CPR) in May 1883.

The arrival of the CPR sparked a long rivalry between the towns, which did not end until their amalgamation in 1970. Until the 1880s, Port Arthur was a much larger community. The CPR, in collaboration with the Hudson's Bay Company, preferred east Fort William, located on the lower Kaministiquia River, where the fur trade posts were. Provoked by a prolonged tax dispute with Port Arthur and its seizure of a locomotive in 1889, the CPR relocated all its employees and facilities to Fort William. The collapse of silver mining after 1890 undermined the economy of Port Arthur. It had an economic depression, while Fort William thrived.

=== 20th century ===
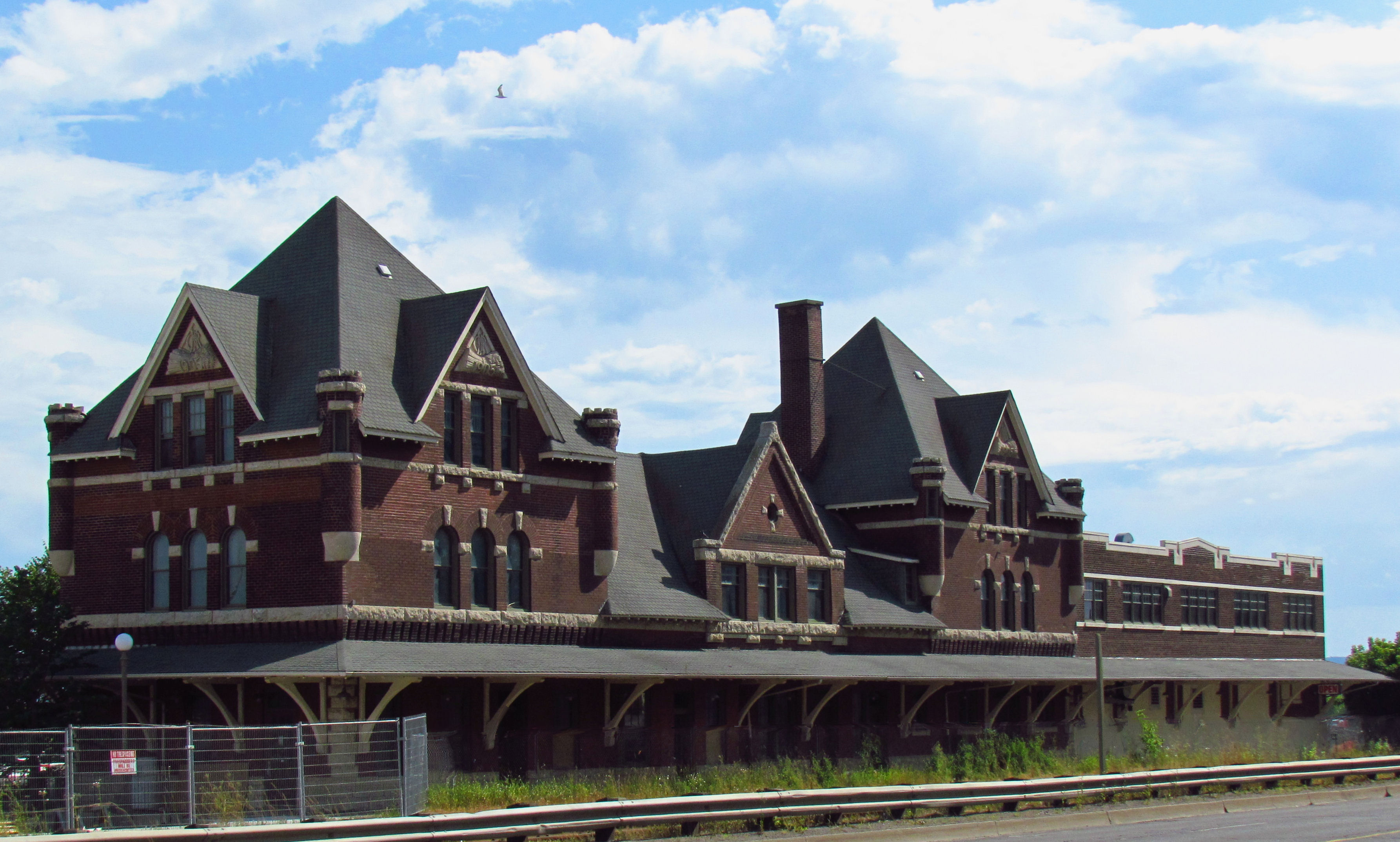
CN Railway Station

In the era of Sir Wilfrid Laurier, Thunder Bay began a period of extraordinary growth, based on improved access to markets via the transcontinental railway and development of the western wheat boom. The CPR double-tracked its Winnipeg–Thunder Bay line. The Canadian Northern Railway established facilities at Port Arthur. The Grand Trunk Pacific Railway began construction of its facilities at the Fort William Mission in 1905, and the federal government began construction of the National Transcontinental Railway. Grain elevator construction boomed as the volume of grain shipped to Europe increased. Both cities incurred debt to grant bonuses to manufacturing industries.

Thunder Bay was the first city in the world to enact daylight saving time on 1 July 1908.

By 1914, the twin cities had modern infrastructures (sewers, potable water supply, street lighting, electric light, etc.) Both Fort William and Port Arthur were proponents of municipal ownership. As early as 1892, Port Arthur built Canada's first municipally owned electric street railway. Both cities spurned Bell Telephone Company of Canada to establish their municipally owned telephone systems in 1902.

The boom came to an end in 1913–1914, aggravated by the outbreak of the First World War. A wartime economy emerged with the making of munitions and shipbuilding. Men from the cities joined the 52nd, 94th, and 141st Battalions of the Canadian Expeditionary Force.

Railway employment was hurt when the federal government took over the National Transcontinental Railway and Lake Superior Division from the Grand Trunk in 1915, and the Canadian Northern Railway in 1918. These were amalgamated with other government-owned railways in 1923 to form the Canadian National Railways. The CNR closed many of the Canadian Northern Railway facilities in Port Arthur. It opened the Neebing yards in Neebing Township in 1922. By 1929, the population of the two cities had recovered to pre-war levels.

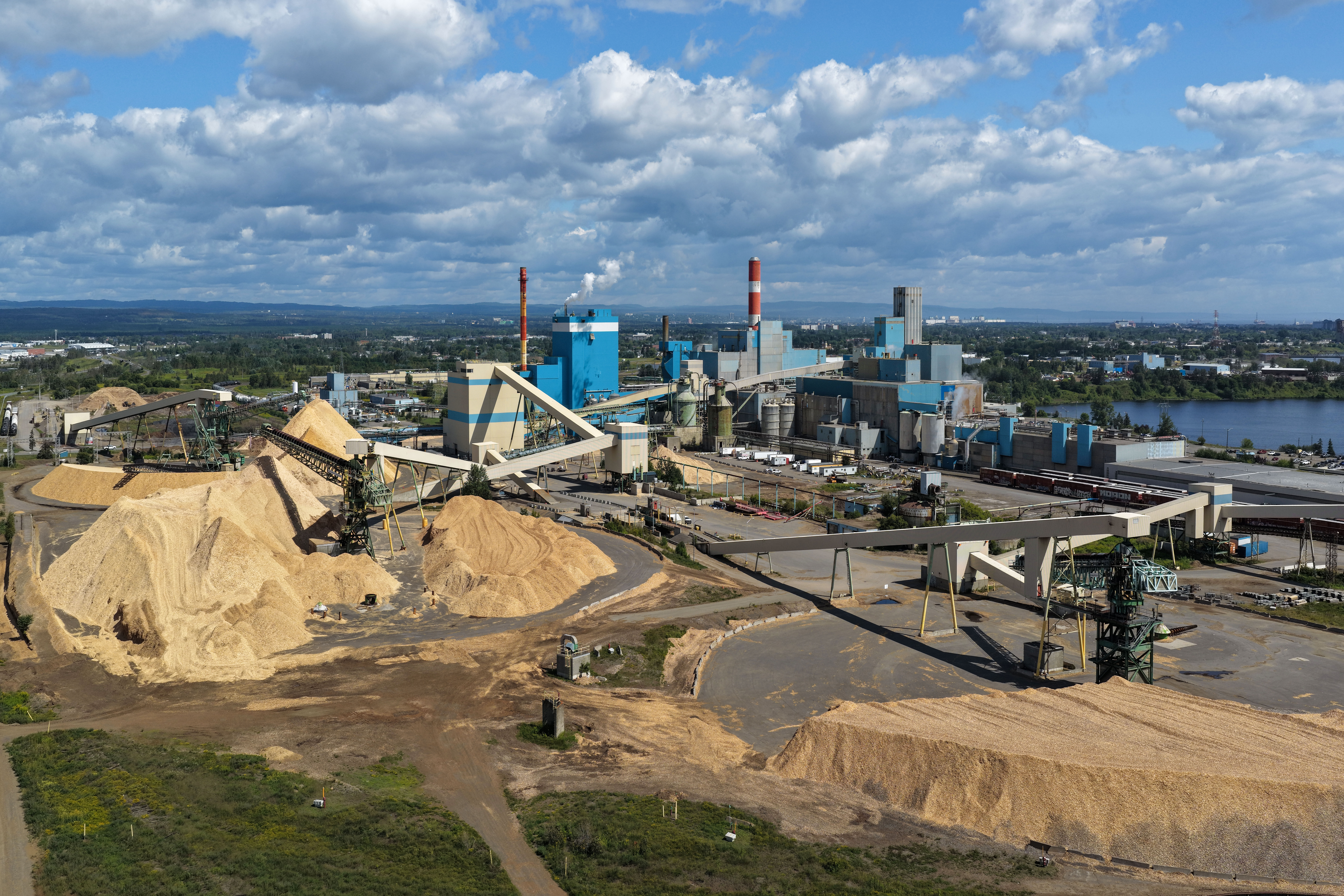
Thunder Bay Pulp and Paper opened in 1924 and operates as a kraft pulp mill

The forest products industry has played an important role in the Thunder Bay economy since the 1870s. In the 1880s, Herman Finger established the Pigeon River Lumber Company in the area, and also built the Gunflint and Lake Superior Railroad, but he dissolved the lumber company and moved his operations to The Pas by 1919. Logs and lumber were shipped primarily to the United States. In 1917, the first pulp and paper mill was established in Port Arthur. It was followed by a mill at Fort William in 1920. Eventually, four mills were operating.

Manufacturing resumed in 1937 when the Canada Car and Foundry Company plant (opened for the manufacture of naval ships and railcars during the late World War I) re-opened to build British aircraft. Now run by Alstom, the plant has remained a mainstay of the post-war economy. It has produced forestry equipment and transportation equipment for urban transit systems, such as the Toronto Transit Commission and GO Transit.

=== Amalgamation ===
On 1 January 1970, the City of Thunder Bay was formed through the merger of the cities of Fort William, Port Arthur, and the geographic townships of Neebing and McIntyre. Its name was the result of a referendum held previously on 23 June 1969, to determine the new name of the amalgamated Fort William and Port Arthur. Officials debated over the names to be put on the ballot, taking suggestions from residents, including "Lakehead" and "The Lakehead". Because the vote split between the two similar names, "Thunder Bay" prevailed with a narrow plurality. The final tally was "Thunder Bay" with 15,870, "Lakehead" with 15,302, and "The Lakehead" with 8,377.

There was more controversy over the selection of a name for the amalgamated city than over whether to amalgamate. A vocal minority of the population preferred "The Lakehead". There was much discussion about other cities in the world that use a definite article in their names. The area was often referred to as "The Lakehead" before and after amalgamation based on its geographic location. It was seen as the "head" of shipping on the Great Lakes and the "rail head".

The expansion of highways, beginning with the Trans-Canada Highway and culminating with the opening of Highway 17 (linking Sault Ste Marie to Thunder Bay in 1960), has significantly diminished railway and shipping activity since the 1970s and 80s. Shipping on the Saint Lawrence Seaway was superseded by trucking on highways. Grain shipping on the Great Lakes to the East has declined substantially in favour of transport to Pacific Coast ports. As a result, many grain elevators have been closed and demolished. The Kaministiquia River was abandoned by industry and shipping.

=== Today ===
Thunder Bay has become the regional services centre for Northwestern Ontario with most provincial departments represented. Lakehead University, established through the lobbying of local businesspeople and professionals, has proven to be a major asset. Another post-secondary institution is Confederation College.

== Geography ==
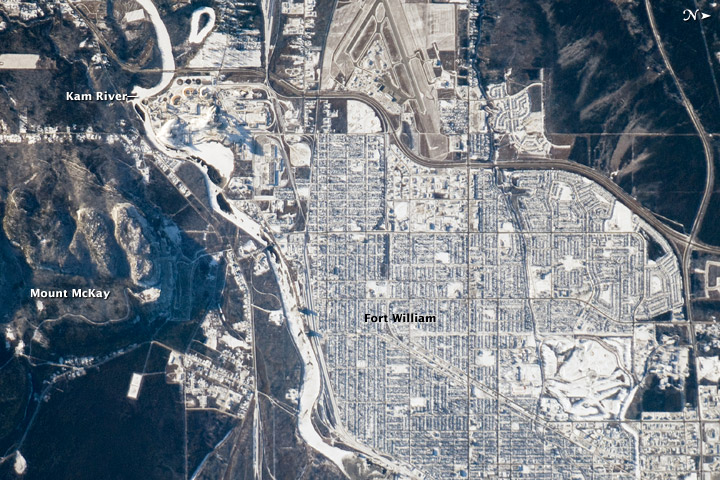
Fort William as seen from the International Space Station, December 2008

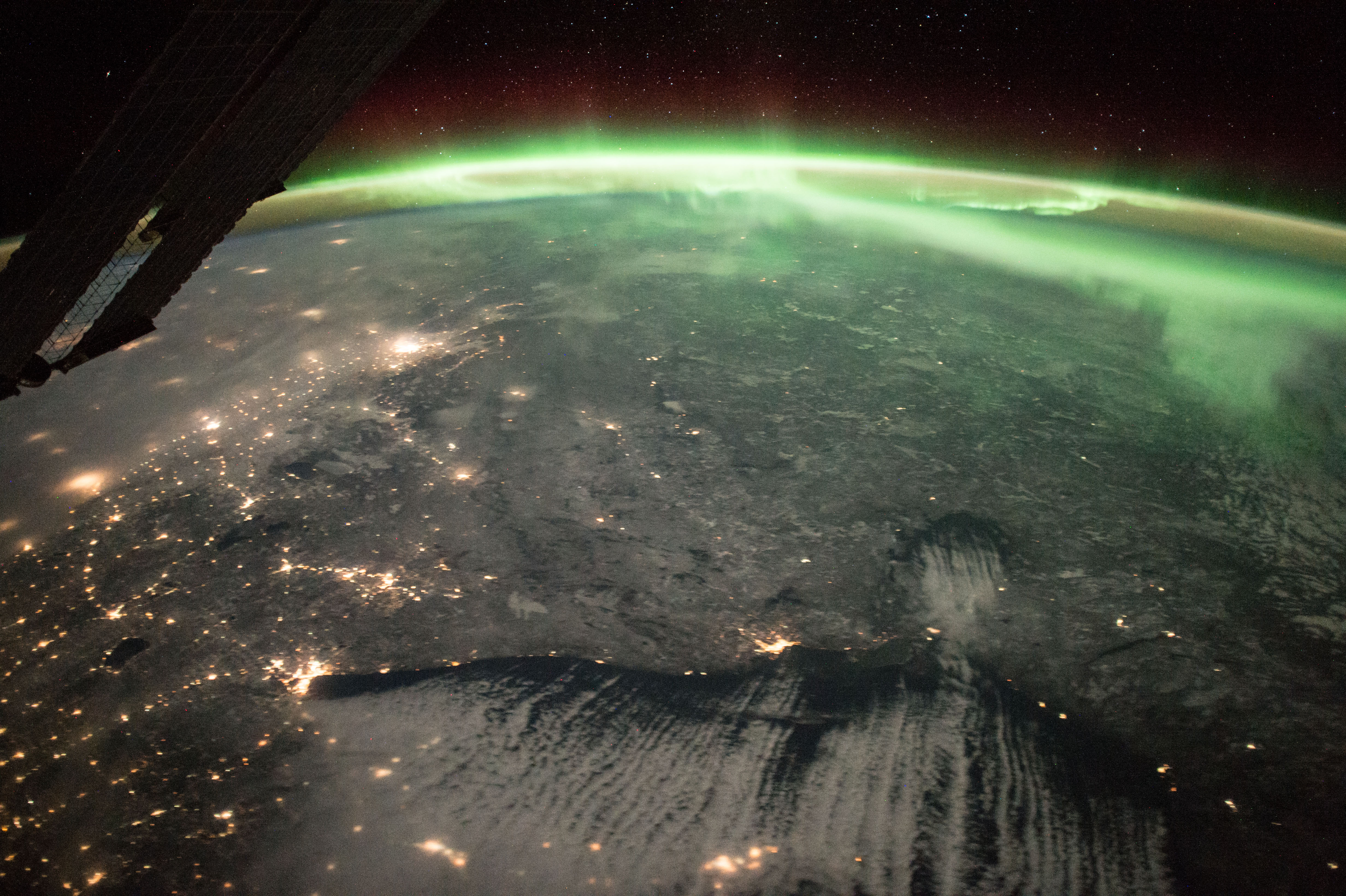
Thunder Bay is the brightly lit city along the top of Lake Superior, taken at 1:58 AM on 10 November 2017, during ISS Expedition 53.

The city has an area of 328.48 square kilometres (126.83 mi^{2}), which includes the former cities of Fort William and Port Arthur, as well as the former townships of Neebing and McIntyre. The city reflects the settlement patterns of the 19th century and sprawls. Anchoring the west end of the city, the Fort William Town Plot, surveyed in 1859–60, was named West Fort William (or Westfort) in 1888 by the CPR. The land adjoining the lower Kaministiquia River became the residential and central business district of the town and city of Fort William. A large uninhabited area adjoining the Neebing and McIntyre rivers, which became known as Intercity, separated Fort William from the residential and central business district of Port Arthur. At the extreme east of the city, a part of McIntyre Township was annexed to the town of Port Arthur in 1892, forming what later became known as the Current River area.

The former Port Arthur section is more typical of the Canadian Shield, with gently sloping hills and very thin soil lying on top of bedrock with many bare outcrops. Thunder Bay, which gives the city its name, is about 22.5 kilometres (14.0 mi) from the Port Arthur downtown to Thunder Cape at the tip of the Sleeping Giant. The former Fort William section occupies flat alluvial land along the Kaministiquia River. In the river delta are two large islands: Mission Island and McKellar Island. Since 1970, the central business districts of Fort William and Port Arthur have suffered a serious decline. Business and government relocated to new developments in the Intercity area. There has also been substantial residential growth in adjacent areas of the former Neebing and McIntyre townships.

=== Neighbourhoods ===
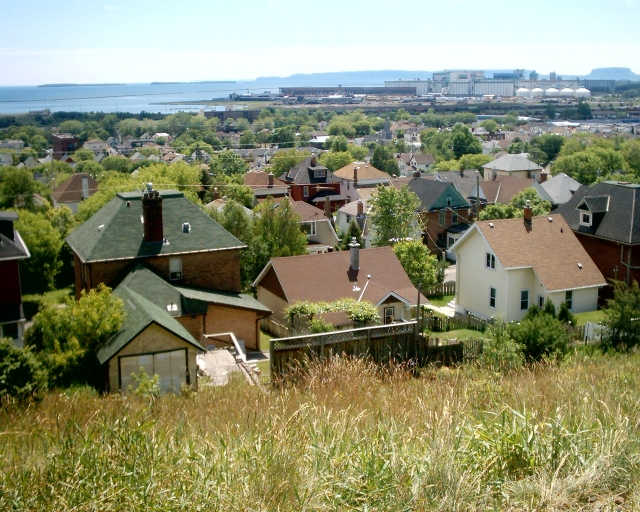
The Port of Thunder Bay, as seen from Hillcrest Park in June 2006

Thunder Bay is composed of two formerly separate cities: Port Arthur and Fort William. Both still retain much of their distinct civic identities, reinforced by the buffering effect of the Intercity area between them. Port Arthur and Fort William each have their own central business districts and suburban areas. Neighbourhoods include: Downtown Fort William, Westfort, Northwood, Mariday Park, Jumbo Gardens, County Park and Current River. Newer neighbourhoods include River Terrace and Parkdale.

=== Climate ===
Thunder Bay

Climate chart (precipitation, max. and min. temperature)
J	F	M	A	M	J	J	A	S	O	N	D
31 −8 −19	25 −5 −18	42 1 −12	42 9 −2	67 16 2	86 22 8	89 25 11	88 24 10	88 19 6	63 11 0	56 3 −7	38 −5 −15
- █ Average max. and min. temperatures in °C
- █ Precipitation totals in mm
Imperial conversion
J	F	M	A	M	J	J	A	S	O	N	D
1.2 18 −3	1 23 −1	1.6 34 11	1.6 48 29	2.6 61 35	3.4 71 46	3.5 77 52	3.4 76 50	3.5 67 42	2.5 52 31	2.2 37 20	1.5 24 6
- █ Average max. and min. temperatures in °F
- █ Precipitation totals in inches

The Thunder Bay area experiences a warm-summer humid continental climate (Köppen: Dfb) with a subarctic (Dfc) influence in northeastern areas of the city (including that affected by Lake Superior), but not necessarily falling in this zone. This results in cooler summer temperatures and warmer winter temperatures for an area extending inland as far as 16 km. The average daily temperatures range from 18.0 °C (64.4 °F) in July to −13.4 °C (7.9 °F) in January. The average daily high in July is 24.9 °C (76.8 °F) and the average daily high in January is −7.6 °C (18.3 °F). On 10 January 1982, the local temperature in Thunder Bay dropped to −36.3 °C (−33.3 °F), with a wind speed of 54 km (34 mi) per hour for a wind chill temperature that dipped to −58 °C (−72.4 °F). As a result, it holds Ontario's record for coldest day with wind chill. The highest temperature ever recorded in Thunder Bay was 40.3 °C (104.5 °F) on 7 August 1983. The coldest temperature ever recorded was −43.2 °C (−45.8 °F) on 31 January 1996. Relatively recently, however, records for both the latest first freeze and the longest growing season were set on October 17, 2021; the previous record of October 8, 2016, was beaten by 9 days, and the previous record for the longest growing season of 139 days (also set in 2016) was beaten by a day.

The city is quite sunny, with an average of 2,121 hours of bright sunshine each year, ranging from 268.1 hours in July to 86.2 hours in November. Winters are comparatively dry with the snowfall being somewhat limited and temperatures much colder than in Houghton, Michigan, on the U.S. side of the lake, where the climate is marked by heavy lake-effect snow. Thunder Bay has more of a continental climate in comparison.

Climate data for Thunder Bay Airport, 1991−2020 normals, extremes 1877−present (Note: Climate data was recorded at Port Arthur from July 1877 to July 1941, and at Thunder Bay Airport from August 1941 to present.)
Month	Jan	Feb	Mar	Apr	May	Jun	Jul	Aug	Sep	Oct	Nov	Dec	Year
Record high humidex	9.2	15.4	24.2	29.7	38.7	43.1	46.2	45.4	41.2	32.3	21.7	11.8	46.2
Record high °C (°F)	9.4 (48.9)	15.5 (59.9)	23.8 (74.8)	28.3 (82.9)	35.2 (95.4)	39.0 (102.2)	40.0 (104.0)	40.3 (104.5)	34.1 (93.4)	30.0 (86.0)	21.7 (71.1)	13.7 (56.7)	40.3 (104.5)
Mean maximum °C (°F)	3.2 (37.8)	5.3 (41.5)	11.9 (53.4)	20.2 (68.4)	27.9 (82.2)	30.1 (86.2)	31.6 (88.9)	30.7 (87.3)	27.8 (82.0)	22.3 (72.1)	12.3 (54.1)	5.2 (41.4)	32.9 (91.2)
Mean daily maximum °C (°F)	−7.6 (18.3)	−5.2 (22.6)	1.0 (33.8)	8.9 (48.0)	15.9 (60.6)	21.6 (70.9)	24.9 (76.8)	24.2 (75.6)	19.2 (66.6)	10.9 (51.6)	2.6 (36.7)	−4.5 (23.9)	9.3 (48.7)
Daily mean °C (°F)	−13.4 (7.9)	−11.8 (10.8)	−5.4 (22.3)	2.4 (36.3)	8.9 (48.0)	14.8 (58.6)	18.0 (64.4)	17.1 (62.8)	12.4 (54.3)	5.3 (41.5)	−2.1 (28.2)	−9.6 (14.7)	3.0 (37.4)
Mean daily minimum °C (°F)	−19.2 (−2.6)	−18.3 (−0.9)	−11.8 (10.8)	−4.2 (24.4)	1.9 (35.4)	7.8 (46.0)	11.0 (51.8)	10.0 (50.0)	5.5 (41.9)	−0.3 (31.5)	−6.7 (19.9)	−14.6 (5.7)	−3.3 (26.1)
Mean minimum °C (°F)	−33.0 (−27.4)	−30.7 (−23.3)	−26.0 (−14.8)	−12.5 (9.5)	−4.9 (23.2)	0.4 (32.7)	5.3 (41.5)	3.5 (38.3)	−2.8 (27.0)	−8.3 (17.1)	−18.9 (−2.0)	−27.5 (−17.5)	−34.4 (−29.9)
Record low °C (°F)	−43.2 (−45.8)	−40.6 (−41.1)	−36.7 (−34.1)	−23.3 (−9.9)	−8.9 (16.0)	−3.9 (25.0)	0.0 (32.0)	−1.1 (30.0)	−8.3 (17.1)	−15.6 (3.9)	−30.6 (−23.1)	−39.6 (−39.3)	−43.2 (−45.8)
Record low wind chill	−58.2	−54.0	−42.7	−32.0	−16.2	−5.8	0.0	−4.0	−10.8	−20.6	−40.0	−51.0	−58.2
Average precipitation mm (inches)	26.3 (1.04)	20.5 (0.81)	31.3 (1.23)	52.9 (2.08)	67.0 (2.64)	83.5 (3.29)	87.0 (3.43)	89.5 (3.52)	73.1 (2.88)	64.3 (2.53)	53.1 (2.09)	35.2 (1.39)	683.7 (26.92)
Average rainfall mm (inches)	0.39 (0.02)	2.9 (0.11)	16.1 (0.63)	36.6 (1.44)	66.3 (2.61)	83.5 (3.29)	87.0 (3.43)	89.5 (3.52)	72.0 (2.83)	55.3 (2.18)	30.7 (1.21)	6.2 (0.24)	546.5 (21.52)
Average snowfall cm (inches)	36.5 (14.4)	21.2 (8.3)	18.2 (7.2)	10.3 (4.1)	1.0 (0.4)	0.0 (0.0)	0.0 (0.0)	0.0 (0.0)	1.1 (0.4)	9.4 (3.7)	26.5 (10.4)	38.9 (15.3)	162.9 (64.1)
Average precipitation days (≥ 0.2 mm)	12.0	9.5	10.3	9.5	11.5	13.8	12.9	12.3	13.7	12.9	12.1	12.4	142.9
Average rainy days (≥ 0.2 mm)	0.57	1.1	3.4	7.1	11.0	13.8	12.9	12.3	13.5	11.0	4.7	1.2	90.7
Average snowy days (≥ 0.2 cm)	12.9	9.6	8.4	4.0	0.50	0.0	0.0	0.0	0.27	3.4	9.7	13.9	62.5
Average relative humidity (%) (at 15:00 LST)	65.6	59.6	56.3	48.7	50.7	57.5	58.8	58.6	61.6	62.1	66.2	69.7	59.6
Average dew point °C (°F)	−16.9 (1.6)	−15.6 (3.9)	−9.8 (14.4)	−4.1 (24.6)	2.7 (36.9)	9.4 (48.9)	13.0 (55.4)	12.7 (54.9)	8.6 (47.5)	1.5 (34.7)	−5.4 (22.3)	−12.3 (9.9)	−1.3 (29.7)
Mean monthly sunshine hours	109.6	126.7	159.8	213.0	259.0	262.0	268.1	255.9	163.8	125.4	86.2	91.2	2,120.5
Percentage possible sunshine	40.1	44.2	43.4	52.0	55.0	54.5	55.2	57.6	43.2	37.2	31.0	35.0	45.7
Source 1: Environment Canada (precipitation/rainfall/snowfall/sun 1981–2010)
Source 2: weatherstats.ca (for dewpoint and monthly&yearly average absolute maximum&minimum temperature)

== Demographics ==
Population history

Year	Pop.	±%
1881	1,965	—
1891	4,874	+148.0%
1901	7,211	+47.9%
1911	27,719	+284.4%
1921	35,427	+27.8%
1931	46,095	+30.1%
1941	55,011	+19.3%
1951	66,108	+20.2%
1956	77,600	+17.4%
1961	92,490	+19.2%
1966	104,539	+13.0%

Year	Pop.	±%
1971	108,411	+3.7%
1976	111,476	+2.8%
1981	112,486	+0.9%
1986	112,272	−0.2%
1991	113,946	+1.5%
1996	113,662	−0.2%
2001	109,016	−4.1%
2006	109,140	+0.1%
2011	108,359	−0.7%
2016	107,909	−0.4%
2021	108,843	+0.9%

In the 2021 Census of Population conducted by Statistics Canada, Thunder Bay had a population of 108,843 living in 48,405 of its 50,995 total private dwellings, a change of 0.9% from its 2016 population of 107,909. With a land area of 327.77 km^{2} (126.55 sq mi), it had a population density of 332.1/km^{2} (860.1/sq mi) in 2021.

At the census metropolitan area (CMA) level in the 2021 census, the Thunder Bay CMA had a population of 123,258 living in 54,212 of its 57,877 total private dwellings, a change of 1.3% from its 2016 population of 121,621. With a land area of 2,550.79 km^{2} (984.87 sq mi), it had a population density of 48.3/km^{2} (125.2/sq mi) in 2021.

According to the 2016 Census, 48.8% of Thunder Bay's residents were male and 51.2% were female. Residents 19 years of age or younger accounted for approximately 19.9% of the population. People aged between 20 and 39 years accounted for 25.0%, while those between 40 and 64 made up 35.1% of the population. The average age of a Thunder Bayer in May 2016 was 43.3, compared to the average of 41.0 for Canada as a whole.

A further 13,712 people lived in Thunder Bay's Census Metropolitan Area, which apart from Thunder Bay includes the municipalities of Neebing and Oliver Paipoonge, the townships of Conmee, Gillies, O'Connor and Shuniah, and the aboriginal community of Fort William First Nation.

=== Ethnicity ===
Largest ethnic origin in Thunder Bay CMA by census tract based on the 2021 census

According to the census, Thunder Bay was home to 13,565 people of Finnish descent, the highest concentration of people of Finnish origin in Canada. Thunder Bay has a large Indigenous population, representing 14.1% of the population; visible minorities represent 7.5% of the population. However, the Indigenous population is likely underestimated, with a substantial proportion unreported in Thunder Bay. It is estimated that there were between 23,080 and 42,641 Indigenous adults in Thunder Bay, approximately two to four times higher than the 9,780 individuals reported in the 2016 Census.

Selected ethnic origins, 2016
Ethnic origin	Population
English	32,825
Canadian	27,850
Scottish	25,425
Irish	22,115
French	19,405
Italian	16,610
Ukrainian	16,085
Indigenous	15,670
Finnish	13,565
German	13,015
Polish	8,395
Swedish	5,360
Visible minorities	4,790
multiple responses included

Panethnic groups in the City of Thunder Bay (2001−2021)
Panethnic group	2021		2016		2011		2006		2001	
Panethnic group	Pop.	%	Pop.	%	Pop.	%	Pop.	%	Pop.	%
European (Note: Statistic includes all persons that did not make up part of a visible minority or an indigenous identity.)	83,620	78.41%	87,030	82.71%	92,300	87.12%	95,270	88.8%	97,520	90.8%
Indigenous	15,055	14.12%	13,490	12.82%	10,085	9.52%	8,845	8.24%	7,250	6.75%
South Asian	2,745	2.57%	935	0.89%	575	0.54%	380	0.35%	330	0.31%
East Asian (Note: Statistic includes total responses of "Chinese", "Korean", and "Japanese" under the visible minority section on the census.)	1,490	1.4%	1,155	1.1%	1,020	0.96%	1,285	1.2%	535	0.5%
African	1,185	1.11%	665	0.63%	485	0.46%	435	0.41%	425	0.4%
Southeast Asian (Note: Statistic includes total responses of "Filipino" and "Southeast Asian" under the visible minority section on the census.)	1,135	1.06%	870	0.83%	770	0.73%	625	0.58%	560	0.52%
Middle Eastern (Note: Statistic includes total responses of "West Asian" and "Arab" under visible minority section on census.)	625	0.59%	515	0.49%	170	0.16%	80	0.07%	215	0.2%
Latin American	390	0.37%	340	0.32%	205	0.19%	165	0.15%	240	0.22%
Other (Note: Statistic includes total responses of "Visible minority, n.i.e." and "Multiple visible minorities" under visible minority section on census.)	400	0.38%	235	0.22%	350	0.33%	205	0.19%	245	0.23%
Total responses	106,640	97.98%	105,225	97.51%	105,950	97.78%	107,290	98.3%	107,405	98.52%
Total population	108,843	100%	107,909	100%	108,359	100%	109,140	100%	109,016	100%

- Note: Totals greater than 100% due to multiple origin responses.

=== Language ===
Mother-tongue language (2016)

Language	Population	Pct (%)
English	90,135	86.1%
Italian	2,815	2.7%
French	2,405	2.3%
Finnish	1,635	1.6%
Ojibwe	920	0.9%
Polish	830	0.8%
Oji-Cree	660	0.7%

=== Religion ===
Largest non-Christian religion in Thunder Bay CMA by census tract based on the 2021 census

In the 2021 census, 56.0% of Thunder Bay residents belonged to a Christian denomination, down from 72.0% in 2011: 30.4% of the total population affiliated with the Roman Catholic Church, 17.6% were Protestant, 4.9% were Christians of unspecified denomination and 3.2% followed other Christian denominations, largely Eastern Orthodox. People of no religion were 39.9%, up from 26.2% in 2011. Of non-Christian religions, the largest were Hinduism (1.1%) and Islam (0.9%). 0.6% of residents adhered to traditional (North American Indigenous) spirituality. All other religions and/or spiritual beliefs made up 1.4% of the population.

=== Crime ===
From 2012 to 2014, and again from 2016 to 2019, Thunder Bay had the highest per-capita rate of homicide among Canadian cities. Winnipeg had previously held this distinction between 2007 and 2011. In 2014, the per-capita rate of homicides in Thunder Bay was more than double the 2012 rate, and was over 2.5 times higher than the city with the next highest rate, with the city having a homicide rate of 10.1 per 100,000 people. However, between 2014 and 2015, the crime rate decreased by 6%. This was the second-highest decrease in any major Canadian city, behind only Moncton, New Brunswick. In 2022, Thunder Bay set a new homicide record with 15, giving the city a homicide rate of 13.7 homicides per 100,000 people, a rate which was comparable to cities such as Charlotte, Dallas, Denver, Phoenix, and Portland in the same year.

== Economy ==
Labour force
Rate	Thunder Bay	Ontario	Canada
Employment	56.0%	59.9%	60.2%
Unemployment	7.7%	7.4%	7.7%
Participation	60.7%	64.7%	65.2%
As of: Census 2016

As the largest city in Northwestern Ontario, Thunder Bay is the region's commercial, administrative and medical centre. Many of the city's largest single employers are in the public sector. The City of Thunder Bay, the Thunder Bay Regional Health Sciences Centre, the Lakehead District School Board and the Government of Ontario each employ over 1,500 people. Resolute Forest Products is the largest private employer, employing over 1,500 people.

Alstom operates a 553,000 square feet (51,400 m^{2}) plant in Thunder Bay which manufactures mass transit vehicles and equipment, employing approximately 500 people. The plant was built by Canadian Car and Foundry to build railway box cars in 1912, began building passenger railcars and transit cars from 1963 onwards Alstom acquired the facility from Bombardier in 2021, which had acquired it from UTDC in 1992, and from Cancar in 1984.

Employment by Occupation, 2016
Occupation	Thunder Bay	Ontario
Management	8.1%	11.3%
Business, Finance, and Administration	14.4%	16.1%
Natural and Applied Sciences	6.2%	7.4%
Health	10.0%	6.4%
Education, Law, and Government	14.5%	11.9%
Art, Culture, Recreation, and Sport	2.3%	3.2%
Sales and Services	30.7%	23.4%
Trades, Transport and Equipment Operators	15.0%	13.3%
Natural Resources and Agriculture	1.9%	1.6%
Manufacturing and Utilities	2.5%	5.2%

Lack of innovation by traditional industries, such as forest products, combined with high labour costs, has reduced the industrial base of Thunder Bay by close to 60%. The grain trade has declined because of the loss of grain transportation subsidies and the loss of European markets. The gradual transition from shipping by train and boat to shipping by truck, and the Canada–United States Free Trade Agreement have ended Thunder Bay's privileged position as a linchpin in Canadian east–west freight-handling trade. As a result, the city has lost its traditional raison d'être as a break-bulk point. However, in recent years shipments through the port of Thunder Bay have stabilized, and it remains an important part of the Saint Lawrence Seaway.

To rejuvenate its economy, the city has been actively working to attract quaternary or "knowledge-based" industries, primarily in the fields of molecular medicine and genomics. The city is home to the western campus of the Northern Ontario School of Medicine, the first medical school to open in Canada in a generation. The city also has a law school.

== Government and politics ==
The city is governed by a mayor and twelve councillors. The mayor and five of the councillors are elected at large by the whole city. In addition, seven ward councillors are elected by their respective constituencies. The current mayor is Ken Boshcoff and the five councillors at large are: Mark Bentz, Shelby Ch'ng, Trevor Giertuga, Rajni Agarwal, and Kasey (Taylor) Etreni.

Thunder Bay is represented in the Ontario Legislature by two provincial ridings, also split along the Harbour Expressway. North of the expressway is Thunder Bay-Superior North, served by Lise Vaugeois of the Ontario New Democratic Party since 2018. On the south side of the city is Thunder Bay-Atikokan, served by Kevin Holland of the Ontario Progressive Conservative Party since 2022.

Thunder Bay provincial election results
Year	PC		New Democratic		Liberal		Green	
2022	32%	12,079	34%	12,953	27%	10,320	3%	1,054
2018	19%	9,155	37%	18,033	39%	18,926	3%	1,251

Thunder Bay is represented in the Canadian Parliament with two federal ridings, split at the Harbour Expressway. South of the expressway is the Thunder Bay-Rainy River riding, currently served by Marcus Powlowski since 2019. The north side of the city is in the Thunder Bay-Superior North riding, served by Patty Hajdu since 2015. Both incumbent member of parliament are members of the Liberal Party of Canada.

Thunder Bay federal election results
Year	Liberal		Conservative		New Democratic		Green	
2021	41%	22,296	23%	12,358	29%	15,559	2%	896
2019	43%	24,287	24%	13,326	25%	14,178	6%	3,555

=== City Wards ===
Thunder Bay can be divided into seven wards, each of which has one councillor:

Number	Ward Name	Boundaries	Ward Councillor
1	Current River	Thunder Bay city limits, Lake Superior waterfront, Red River Road, Algoma Street, McVicar Creek, Highway 11/17, Current River	Andrew Foulds
2	Red River	Highway 11/17, McVicar Creek, Algoma Street, Red River Road, High Street, John Street, Balmoral Street, Harbour Expressway	Michael Zussino
3	McKellar	Red River Road, Lake Superior Waterfront, Arthur Street, Waterloo Street, Balmoral Street, John Street, High Street	Brian Hamilton
4	McIntyre	Thunder Bay northern city limits, Current River, Highway 11/17, Thunder Bay western city limits	Albert Aiello
5	Northwood	Harbour Expressway, Balmoral Street, Waterloo Street, Arthur Street, Highway 61	Dominic Pasqualino
6	Westfort	Arthur Street, Kaministiquia River, Lake Superior Waterfront, City Road, Chippewa Road, Highway 61	Kristen Oliver
7	Neebing	Highway 11/17, Highway 61, Chippewa Road, Mountain Road, Thunder Bay city limits	Greg Johnsen

Map of Thunder Bay's seven municipal wards

Currently, the city is studying possibilities for reducing the size of the city council from 13 to a smaller number. These changes, if successful, would be implemented from the 2026 Municipal election. In September 2024, two ideas were presented:

- No wards: All wards will be abolished, eliminating the positions of all ward councillors effective the 2026 election. Five new councillor-at-large positions will be created for a total of 10 councillors at large. This system allows all members of the city council to be elected by all citizens of Thunder Bay, regardless of where they live.
- 4 wards: There would be four wards instead of seven. These new wards would be designed by splitting the city along east-west corridors. Instead of names like current wards, they would have numbers 1-4, with 1 being the northernmost and 4 being the southernmost. Wards 1 and 2 would be split by Dawson Road, Red River Road, Junot Avenue, and River Street. Oliver Road would split wards 2 and 3, while Arthur Street would split wards 3 and 4. Each ward would have 2 councillors instead of 1, resulting in 8 ward councillors. The number of councillors at large would be reduced from 5 to 2, resulting in 10 city councillors.

However, by April 2025, the possibilities of implementing either composition were defeated following a vote by the city council.

=== City symbols ===
Sleeping Giant

A large formation of mesas on the Sibley Peninsula in Lake Superior, which resembles a reclining giant, has become a symbol of the city. Sibley Peninsula partially encloses the waters of Thunder Bay and dominates the view of the lake from the northern section of the city (formerly Port Arthur). The Sleeping Giant also figures on the city's coat of arms and the city flag.

Coat of arms

The Coat of Arms of the City of Thunder Bay, which incorporates features from the coats of arms of Port Arthur and Fort William

The coat of arms of Thunder Bay, Ontario, is a combination of the coats of arms of both Port Arthur and Fort William, with a unifying symbol—the Sleeping Giant—at the base of the arms.

Corporate logo

The city logo depicts a stylized thunderbird, called Animikii, a statue of which is located at the city's Kaministiquia River Heritage Park. The slogan, Superior by Nature, is a double play on words reflecting the city's natural setting on Lake Superior.

City flag

Thunder Bay's flag was created in 1972 when mayor Saul Laskin wanted to promote the city by having a distinctive flag. The city held a contest, which Cliff Redden won. The flag has a 1:2 ratio and depicts a golden sky from the rising sun behind the Sleeping Giant, which sits in the blue waters of Lake Superior. The sun is represented by a red maple leaf, a symbol of Canada. Green and gold are Thunder Bay's city colours.

=== Thunder Bay Police Services ===
The municipal law enforcement agency was formed in 1970 from Port Arthur and Fort William Police forces, which were formed in the late 1800s. It has over 200 sworn officers and 6 police centres.

== Culture ==
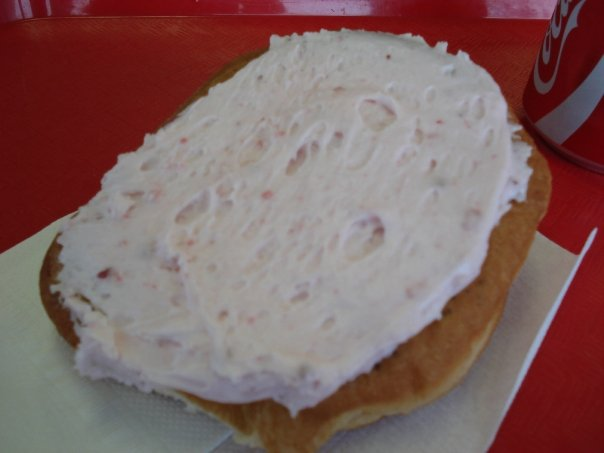
A Persian, local to Thunder Bay

The city of Thunder Bay was declared a "Cultural Capital of Canada" in 2003. Throughout the city are cultural centres representing the diverse population, such as the Finnish Labour Temple, Scandinavia House, the Italian Cultural Centre, the Polish Legion, and a wide variety of others.

The shag, a combination shower and stag held to celebrate the engagement of a couple, and the Persian, a cinnamon bun pastry with pink icing, both originated in the city.

Thunder Bay is served by the Thunder Bay Public Library, which has four branches. These branches are Waverley (Downtown Port Arthur), Brodie (Downtown Fort William), Mary J.L. Black (Westfort), and County Fair (County Fair Plaza)

Events in the city include Thunder Pride, an LGBTQ pride parade held since 2010, and the annual Canadian Lakehead Exhibition. Marina Park also hosts several events in the summer, including Canada Day celebrations and the Festival of India/Festival of Colours.

=== Arts ===
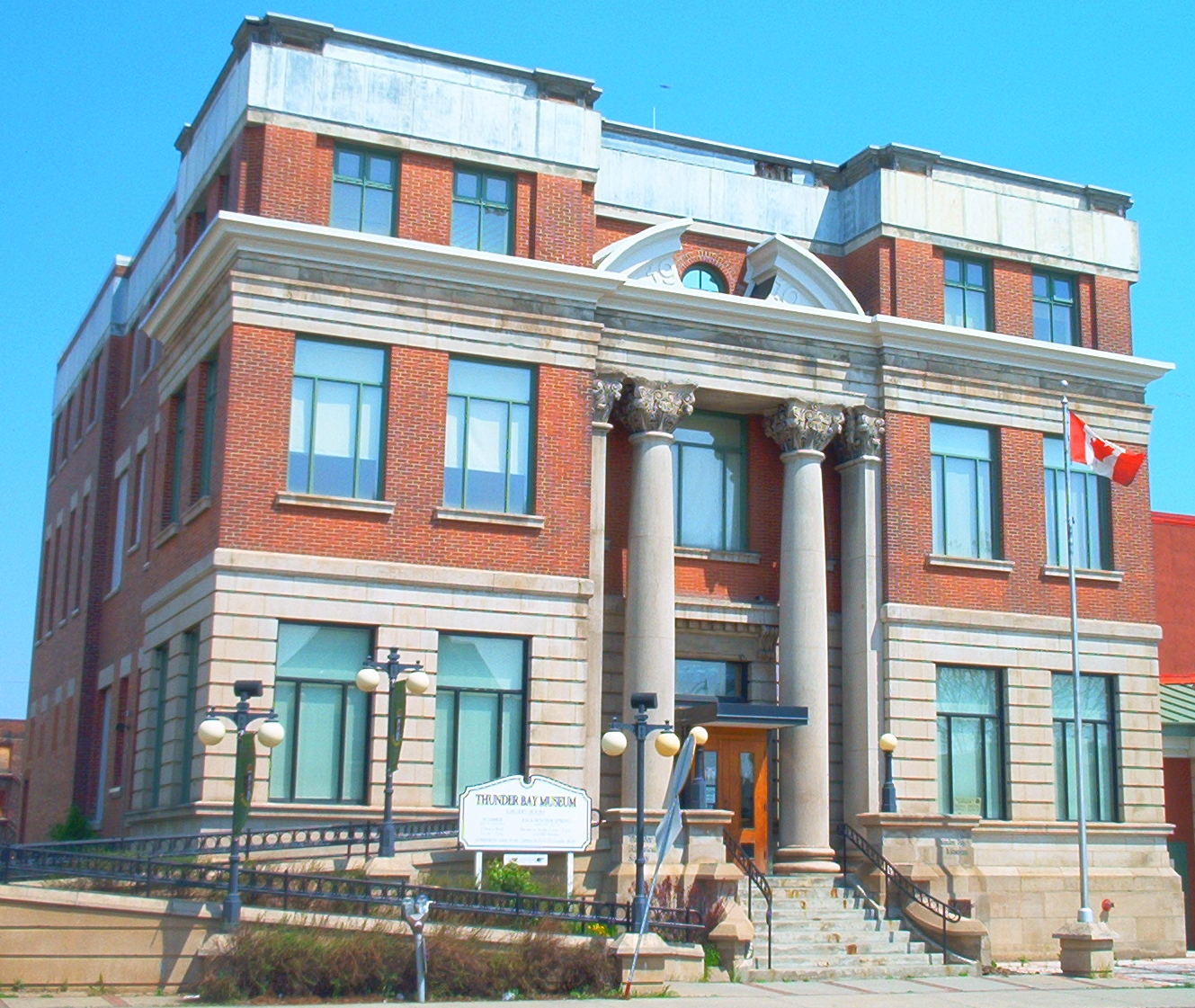
Thunder Bay Historical Museum

Thunder Bay is home to a variety of music and performance arts venues. The Thunder Bay Symphony Orchestra, founded in 1960, is the only professional orchestra between Winnipeg and Toronto and has 31 full-time and up to 30 extra musicians presenting a full range of classical music. New Music North is vital to the contemporary classical music scene in the city by offering novel contemporary chamber music concerts. The largest professional theatre is Magnus Theatre. Founded in 1971, it offers six stage plays each season and is located in the renovated Port Arthur Public School on Red River Road. The Thunder Bay Community Auditorium, which seats 1500, is the primary venue for various types of entertainment.

The Vox Popular Media Arts Festival, established in 2005, is an independent film festival that features local, national, and international films with the theme of "Films for the People." The festival is held in early October at 314 Bay Street in the historic Finnish Labour Temple. Thunder Bay is also home to the North of Superior Film Association (NOSFA). Established in 1992, the NOSFA features monthly screenings of international and Canadian films at the Cumberland Cinema Centre and organizes the annual Northwest Film Fest film festival that attracts several thousand patrons. Two of Thunder Bay's festivals were included in the 2018 list of the 100 best festivals compiled by Festivals and Events Ontario: Teddy Bears Picnic and Live on the Waterfront, the former also being recognized as the best promotional campaign and sponsor of the year.

The Northwestern Ontario Writers Workshop, founded in 1997, is a writing group based in Thunder Bay that promotes the development of writers and literature in Northwestern Ontario.

=== Museums and galleries ===
The Thunder Bay Art Gallery, which was founded in 1976, specializes in the works of First Nations artists, having a collection of national significance. The Thunder Bay Historical Museum Society, founded in 1908, presents local and travelling exhibitions and houses an impressive collection of artifacts, photographs, paintings, documents and maps in its archives. The City of Thunder Bay also houses the Northwestern Ontario Sports Hall of Fame, and the Thunder Bay Military Museum (housed within the O'Kelley Armoury on Park Street).

Thunder Bay has two recognized Federal Heritage buildings on the Register of the Government of Canada Heritage Buildings:

- Ordnance Store (recognized 1997)
- Park Street Armoury (recognized 1994)

Both are part of HMCS Griffin.

The Northwestern Ontario Aviation Heritage Centre was founded in 2007 with a mandate to collect, preserve and celebrate the aviation history of the region. It houses a large collection of artifacts and photographs, particularly related to the Canadian Car and Foundry factory (Can-Car), which manufactured Hawker Hurricane fighters and Curtiss SB2C Helldivers during World War II.

=== Places of worship ===
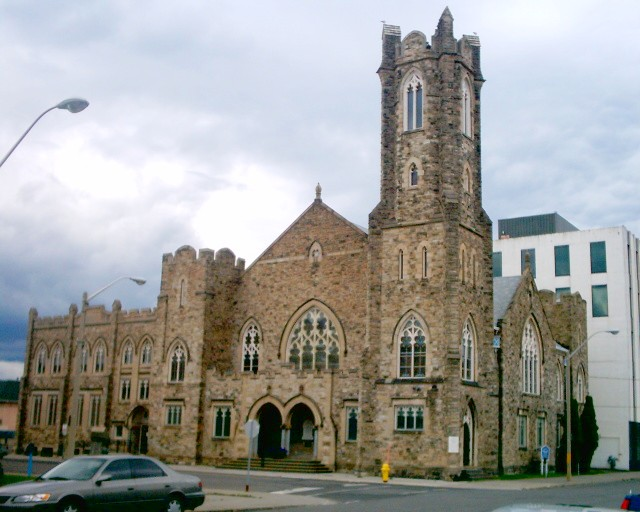
St. Andrews Presbyterian Church

Thunder Bay has many places of worship supported by people of a variety of faiths, reflecting the cultural diversity of the population. A sample:

- Assumption of the Blessed Virgin Mary Church – Ukrainian Orthodox. The original wooden church, built by Ukrainian Orthodox families in 1911/1912, was almost destroyed by fire in 1936. The current church was built on the same site and opened in 1937. It has decorative gold domes that are characteristic of Ukrainian churches of the Bukovina area, with Orthodox crosses atop the domes.
- Calvary Lutheran Church was established in 1958 as a mission congregation of the Minnesota North District (USA).
- The Church of Jesus Christ of Latter-day Saints (LDS Church) – The church has a family history library open to anyone to research their genealogy.
- Elim Community Christian Centre – Pentecostal Church located in the Current River area of the city which is now named Refreshing Waters Community Church.
- Evangel Church – Contemporary Pentecostal church with a strong emphasis on children, youth, and (with its convenient location next to Lakehead University) young adults.
- First-Wesley United Church – The current Wesley United Church was preceded by a much smaller structure, Grace Methodist Church, which was built in 1891 and had a capacity of 100 people. The current Gothic 1,025-seat sanctuary was constructed in 1910.
- Hilldale Lutheran Church – Offers services in both English and Finnish. The church has an intimate atmosphere and wonderful acoustics and is frequently used for musical performances.
- Holy Trinity Greek Orthodox Church – Founded in 1918, the church moved to its present building in 1991. The church is active in providing non-profit housing for needy families.
- Hope Christian Reformed Church – Services are recorded so that anyone with an internet connection may listen.
- Kitchitwa Kateri Anamewgamik – Roman Catholic communal church geared to Native culture and teachings. A drop-in centre provides coffee and serves soup & bannock.
- Lakehead Unitarian Fellowship – This Unitarian Universalist community includes Christians, Buddhists, Pagans, Theists, non-theists, Humanist-agnostics, and Atheists. They welcome and celebrate the presence and participation of gay, lesbian, bisexual, and transgender persons.
- Redwood Park Church – Contemporary member of the Christian Missionary Alliance. Runs an outreach at the old building (now New Hope Fellowship Church) on Edward Street with a food bank and a clothing store.
- Saalem Church – Pentecostal church with services in both English and Finnish.
- Shaarey Shomayim Congregation – Jewish Synagogue. This egalitarian community has the only mikvah between Winnipeg and Toronto.
- Shepherd of Israel Congregation – Messianic Jewish. Affiliated with the Evangelical movement.
- St. Agnes Church – Roman Catholic Church. Founded in 1885, the new St. Agnes Church and Hall was dedicated on 6 June 1982. St. Vincent de Paul Society operates a food bank out of this church.
- St Stephen the Martyr Anglican Church – Provides a food cupboard for the Current River area.
- St. John the Evangelist Anglican Church – Founded in 1872, the current building was erected in 1884.
- St. Patrick's Cathedral – Roman Catholic. The old St. Patrick's Church was built in 1893. In 1963, it was replaced by the current cathedral on the same site.
- St Paul's Anglican Church – Historic, stately parish built in the English Gothic style.
- St. Anthony's Parish – Roman Catholic. Located in the John-Jumbo area of Port Arthur.
- Thunder Bay Masjid – Muslim mosque
- Vedic Cultural Centre (ISKON) Thunder Bay – Hindu temple
- Thunder Bay Sikh Society – Sikh gurdwara

== Visitor attractions ==
Thunder Bay's main tourist attraction is Fort William Historical Park, a reconstruction of the North West Company's Fort William fur trade post as it was in 1815, which attracts 100,000 visitors annually. The marina in downtown Port Arthur, an area known as The Waterfront District, draws visitors for its panoramic view of the Sleeping Giant and the presence of various watercraft. The marina, known as Prince Arthur's Landing, also includes recreational trails along the lake, a playground, harbour cruises, helicopter tours, the Alexander Henry (a retired Canadian Coast Guard icebreaker), a splash pad (summer), a skating rink (winter), an art gallery, a gift shop, numerous restaurants, and a newly opened Delta Hotel and conference centre. There are several small surface amethyst mines in the area, some of which allow visitors to search for their crystals. A 2.74 m (9 ft) statue of Terry Fox is situated at the Terry Fox Memorial and Lookout on the outskirts of the city near the place where he was forced to abandon his run. Other tourist attractions are listed below:

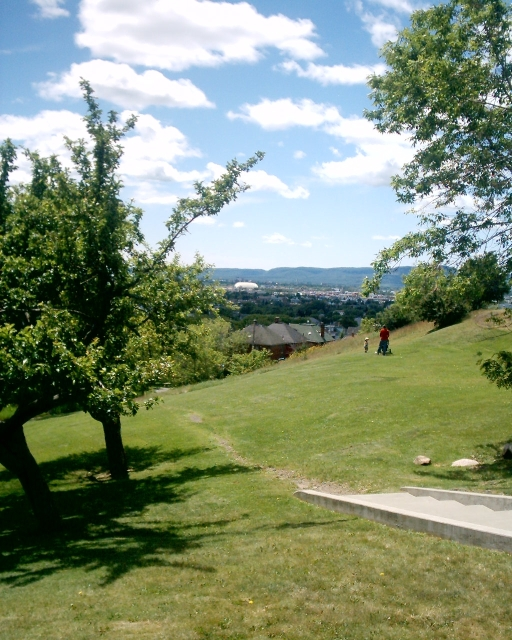
Hillcrest Park, looking south to Fort William

- Bluffs Scenic Lookout
- Boulevard Lake Park
- Canada Games Complex
- Canadian Lakehead Exhibition
- Cascades Conservation Area
- Centennial Conservatory
- Centennial Park
- Chapples Park
- Chippewa Park
- Connaught Square
- Finnish Labour Temple
- Fort William Gardens
- Fort William Stadium
- Hillcrest Park
- Intercity Shopping Centre
- Kakabeka Falls
- Magnus Theatre
- Mission Island Marsh
- Mount McKay Lookout
- MV Miseford
- Northwestern Ontario Sports Hall of Fame
- Ouimet Canyon
- Prince Arthur's Landing waterfront district
- Port Arthur Stadium
- Silver Falls
- Thunder Bay Art Gallery
- Thunder Bay Community Auditorium
- Thunder Bay Historical Museum
- Thunder Bay Marina
- International Friendship Gardens
- Trowbridge Falls
- Waverley Park

== Sports and recreation ==
Thunder Bay's proximity to the wilderness of the Taiga and the rolling hills and mountains of the Canadian Shield allow its residents to enjoy very active lifestyles. The city has hosted several large sporting events, including:

- Summer Canada Games in 1981
- Nordic World Ski Championships in 1995
- Continental Cup of Curling in 2003
- U-18 Baseball World Cup in 2010 and 2017
- 2024 Women's Baseball World Cup (Group A and Finals)
- The Scotties Tournament of Hearts, Canada's national women's curling championship, was hosted in Thunder Bay in 2022. Still, public spectators were not permitted in the arena due to COVID-19 restrictions. Organizers later planned its return for February 14–23, 2025, this time welcoming fans back, which helped support tourism and local economic activity.

=== Recreational facilities ===
Thunder Bay enjoys many recreational facilities. The city operates fifteen neighbourhood community centres, which offer various sporting and fitness facilities as well as seasonal activities such as dances. The city also operates six indoor ice rinks and 84 seasonal outdoor rinks, two indoor community pools and three seasonal outdoor pools as well as a portable pool and two maintained public beaches, several curling sheets, and three golf courses, among others. Listed below are some of the city's major facilities.

Multi-use facilities

- The Canada Games Complex
- The Fort William Gardens
- Port Arthur Stadium
- Royal Canadian Legion Sports Complex

Municipal ice rinks and indoor pools

- Current River Arena
- Delaney Arena
- Grandview Arena
- Neebing Arena
- Port Arthur Arena
- Thunder Bay Tournament Centre (2 ice surfaces)
- Sir Winston Churchill Community Pool
- Volunteer Community Pool

Golf courses

- Centennial Golf Course (9 holes)
- Chapples Memorial Golf Course (18 holes) (municipal)
- Dragon Hills Golf Course (9 holes)
- Emerald Greens Golf Course (9 holes)
- Fort William Country Club (18 holes)
- Municipal Golf Course (9 holes) (municipal) (closed)
- Northern Lights Golf Complex (9 holes par 3/9 holes regulation)
- Strathcona Golf Course (18 holes) (municipal)
- Thunder Bay Country Club (9 holes)
- Whitewater Golf Club (18 holes)

Ski hills

- Loch Lomond Ski Resort
- Mount Baldy Ski Resort

Cross-country skiing facilities

- Lappe Nordic Ski Centre
- Kamview Nordic Centre

=== Sports teams ===
Club	Sport	League	Venue
Thunder Bay North Stars	Ice hockey	Superior International Junior Hockey League	Fort William Gardens
Lakehead Thunderwolves	Basketball	Ontario University Athletics	C.J. Sanders Fieldhouse
Lakehead Thunderwolves	Baseball	National Club Baseball Association Div 2 (USA)	Baseball Central
Lakehead Thunderwolves	Ice Hockey	Ontario University Athletics	Fort William Gardens
Lakehead Thunderwolves	Volleyball	Ontario University Athletics	C.J. Sanders Fieldhouse
Thunder Bay Border Cats	Baseball	Northwoods League	Port Arthur Stadium
Thunder Bay Chill	Soccer	Prairies Premier League	Fort William Stadium
Thunder Bay Kings	Ice hockey	Greater Toronto Hockey League	Fort William First Nation Arena
Kam River Fighting Walleye	Ice hockey	Superior International Junior Hockey League	NorWest Arena
Thunder Bay Kombans	Cricket	Northern Ontario Cricket League (NOCL)	Chapples cricket ground

Thunder Bay is also home to the National Development Centre – Thunder Bay, an elite cross-country ski team that attracts many of Canada's best Junior and U-23 skiers.

=== Sport events ===
- Thunder Bay 10 mile road race
- 2010 World Junior Baseball Championship
- 2017 U-18 Baseball World Cup
- 2024 Women's Baseball World Cup

== Infrastructure ==
=== Transport ===
Thunder Bay receives air, rail, and shipping traffic due to its prime location along major continental transport routes.

Thunder Bay has some public transportation amenities. The municipally owned Thunder Bay Transit operates 20 routes across the city's urban area and some limited service routes serving the Neebing ward and Fort William First Nation reserve. Ontario Northland also provides intercity bus services to neighbouring cities, including Winnipeg and Sault Ste. Marie.

The city is served by the Thunder Bay International Airport, the fourth busiest airport in Ontario by aircraft movements. In addition, the Thunder Bay Regional Health Sciences Centre has a helipad.

The main highways through the city are Highway 11/17 and Highway 61, which are linked together in Thunder Bay as a four-lane highway designated as the Thunder Bay Expressway. A notable expressway is the Harbour Expressway, which is a municipal expressway that connects the Intercity business district to the highways. Some of Thunder Bay's arterial roads include Dawson Road (Hwy 102), Red River Road, Arthur Street, Golf Links Road, Balmoral Street, Memorial Avenue, and Fort William Road.

The city is an important railway hub, served by both the Canadian National and Canadian Pacific Railway. Passenger rail service to Thunder Bay ended on 15 January 1990, when Via Rail rerouted the Canadian to the north.

=== Harbour ===
Thunder Bay has been a port since the days of the North West Company, which maintained a schooner on Lake Superior. The Port of Thunder Bay is the largest outbound port on the St. Lawrence Seaway System, and the sixth-largest port in Canada. The Thunder Bay Port Authority manages Keefer Terminal, built on a 320,000 square metre site on Lake Superior.

=== Medical centres and hospitals ===
Thunder Bay has one major hospital, the Thunder Bay Regional Health Sciences Centre. Other healthcare services include the St. Joseph's Care Group, which operates long-term care centres such as the Lakehead Psychiatric Hospital, St. Joseph's Hospital, and Hogarth Riverview Manor. The city is also home to a variety of smaller medical and dental clinics.

The health authority in the region is the Thunder Bay District Health Unit.

== Education ==
Thunder Bay has 38 elementary schools, three middle schools, eight secondary schools, two private schools, and an adult education facility. The city also has several other private for-profit colleges and tutoring programmes. Post-secondary institutions in Thunder Bay include Confederation College, Northern Ontario School of Medicine (NOSM), and Lakehead University.

The Lakehead District School Board is the largest school board in the city, with 22 elementary schools, 3 high schools and a centre for adult studies. The Thunder Bay Catholic District School Board is the second largest, with 16 elementary schools, three middle schools, and two high schools. Conseil scolaire de district catholique des Aurores boréales operates one elementary and one high school in Thunder Bay, and an additional six schools throughout the Thunder Bay District. Conseil scolaire du Grand Nord operates one public French-language elementary school in Thunder Bay, and additional schools throughout Northern Ontario.

== Media ==
=== Print ===
Thunder Bay has one daily newspaper, The Chronicle-Journal, which has a circulation of approximately 28,000 and has coverage of all of Northwestern Ontario. The Chronicle Journal publishes a free weekly called Spot every Thursday, focusing on entertainment. There are two weekly newspapers: Thunder Bay Source, a weekly newspaper operated by Dougall Media, and Kanadan Sanomat, a Finnish-language weekly newspaper. Lakehead University has a student newspaper called The Argus, which is published weekly during the school year. The monthly arts & culture magazine The Walleye is available in print at many locations around the city. The city publishes a bi-monthly newsletter to citizens titled yourCity, which is also available online in a PDF format, by electronic subscription, and RSS feed.

=== Television ===
Three English-language stations supply Thunder Bay with free digital over-the-air television. Programming from the Global and CTV networks is provided by a locally owned twinstick operation branded as Thunder Bay Television. The city receives TVOntario on channel 9. CBC Television and Ici Radio-Canada Télé are available only on cable and satellite in the area.

The cable provider in Thunder Bay is Shaw. However, locally owned Tbaytel has been granted a licence by the Canadian Radio-television and Telecommunications Commission (CRTC) to compete in the cable TV market. The community channel on Shaw Cable is branded as Shaw Spotlight, and airs on cable channel 10.

=== Radio ===
Thunder Bay is home to 12 radio stations, all of which broadcast on the FM band.

There are four commercial radio stations based in the city – CJSD-FM and CKPR-FM, owned by Dougall Media, the parent company of Thunder Bay Television and Thunder Bay's Source, and CJUK-FM and CKTG-FM, owned by Acadia Broadcasting. One additional station, CFQK-FM, targets the Thunder Bay market from transmitters in Kaministiquia and Shuniah. The city receives CBC Radio One as CBQT-FM and CBC Music as CBQ-FM, at 88.3 FM and 101.7 FM respectively. The French Première Chaîne is available as a repeater of Sudbury-based CBON-FM on 89.3 FM. Lakehead University operates a campus radio station, CILU-FM, at 102.7 FM, and CJOA-FM 95.1 broadcasts Christian-oriented programming from the UCB Canada network. Thunder Bay Information Radio CKSI-FM is broadcast 24/7 on 90.5 FM, and is also the city's emergency radio station.

== Sister cities ==
Thunder Bay had five sister cities on three continents, which were selected based on economic, cultural, and political criteria. In July 2023, the city council voted 7-4 to end the program.

- Seinäjoki, Finland, since 1974
- Little Canada, Minnesota, United States, since 1977
- Duluth, Minnesota, United States, since 1980
- Gifu, Japan, since 2007
- Jiaozuo, China, since 2017
- Siderno, Italy

== See also ==
- Synergy North

== Notes and references ==
- Thorold J. Tronrud and A. Ernest Epp (1995) Thunder Bay: From Rivalry to Unity, Thunder Bay Historical Museum Society, ISBN 0-920119-20-4
