= Thunder Bay Expressway =

Limited-access highway in Thunder Bay, ON

Thunder Bay Expressway
- Part of Terry Fox Courage Highway; Ontario Highway 7250
- A map of the Thunder Expressway, showing Highway 11/17 in red and Highway 61 in navy blue.

Route information
- Maintained by Ministry of Transportation of Ontario
- Length: 15.3 km (9.5 mi)
- Existed: August 29, 1967–present
- History: Highway 61 extended: 2007

Major junctions
- South end: Arthur Street (as Highway 61)
- Harbour Expressway east Highway 11 / Highway 17 / TCH west Highway 102 west / Red River Road east Balsam Street
- East end: Copenhagen Road north / Hodder Avenue south (as Highway 11 / Highway 17 / TCH east)

Location
- Country: Canada
- Province: Ontario
- Major cities: Thunder Bay

Highway system
- Ontario provincial highways; Current; Former; 400-series
| ← Highway 10 | → Highway 11B |
| ← Highway 16 | → Highway 17A |
| ← Highway 60 | → Highway 62 |

The Thunder Bay Expressway, originally known as the Lakehead Expressway is a high-capacity at-grade suburban limited access highway corridor around the western side of Thunder Bay in the Canadian province of Ontario. The 15.3 km (9.5 mi) route travels in a generally north–south direction on the city's west side. It carries a part of Highway 61 at its southern segment, and a part of the concurrent routes Highway 11 and Highway 17 at the six remaining segments. The expressway features several at-grade intersections between its southern terminus at Arthur Street West and its northeastern terminus at Hodder Avenue.

The Thunder Bay Expressway was built throughout the mid-to-late 1960s, and opened in stages between mid-1967 and late 1970, rerouting Highway 11/17 around the city. The old routes of Highway 11/17 and Highway 61 through Thunder Bay were redesignated as Highway 11B/17B and Highway 61B. In 2008, following the opening of the “Shabaqua Highway” segment of the 11/17, the segment between Arthur Street and Harbour Expressway was transferred to Highway 61. Work is now ongoing to twin Highway 11/17 northeast to Nipigon.

== Route description ==
The Thunder Bay Expressway forms the southernmost portion of the Terry Fox Courage Highway, which continues east to Nipigon along the Trans-Canada Highway. Between Arthur Street and the Harbour Expressway, the route is designated as part of Highway 61, while between there and the northeastern terminus at Hodder Avenue it is designated as part of Highway 11 and Highway 17, and as a portion of the Trans-Canada Highway. The entire route is four lanes and undivided, with an exception between Balsam Street and Hodder Avenue where the opposing lanes are separated by a grass median. Aside from Hodder Avenue, it features signalised at-grade intersections at the six other crossroads along its length.

- A map of Thunder Bay showing the entire Thunder Bay Expressway

The Thunder Bay Expressway begins in the south at Arthur Street West, which was once the route of Highway 11 and Highway 17 west from Thunder Bay prior to 2008. To the south, Highway 61 continues towards Thunder Bay Airport and eventually the American border. Travelling north, the Thunder Bay Expressway is designated as the northernmost segment of Highway 61. Featuring a 100 metres (330 ft) right-of-way sandwiched between residential subdivisions of Parkdale and Northwood, the four lane undivided road crosses over the Neebing River. It curves to the northeast, with a large swamp to the west (north of Parkdale) and Northwood subdivisions to the east. The expressway reaches a signalised intersection with Harbour Expressway and Highways 11/17, which continue west along the Shabaqua Highway; the Highway 61 designation ends at this intersection, and Highways 11 and 17 turn northward along the expressway.

Continuing north, the Thunder Bay Expressway travels through an undeveloped area of the city. It encounters an intersection with Oliver Road before becoming surrounded by forests. It curves northeast over a branch of the McIntyre River at McIntyre Falls, then follows parallel to and north of Golf Links Road. The route becomes sandwiched between residential subdivisions again (Cherry Ridge, Jumbo Gardens, and River Terrace) as it approaches an intersection with John Street. It continues, intersecting the eastern terminus of Highway 102, before crossing McVicar Creek. The route intersects Balsam Street before leaving urban Thunder Bay and entering into forests, at which point the opposing lanes become separated by a grass median. After travelling parallel to the Current River for a short distance, the Thunder Bay Expressway crosses the river and curves east to encounter its only interchange, with Hodder Avenue. From there, the divided freeway continues east towards Nipigon.

== History ==
Prior to the construction of the Lakehead Expressway in the 1960s, Highway 11/17 and Highway 61 used local streets through the cities of Fort William and Port Arthur. In Port Arthur, Highway 11/17 entered the city from Shuniah through Lakeshore Drive into Current River. It then turned south on Hodder Avenue and continued south along Cumberland Street, which used to turn west downtown to become Bay Street. From Bay Street, Highway 11/17 then followed Algoma Street/Memorial Avenue south out of Port Arthur and into Fort William, where the roadway is named May Street. Following May Street, this highway then turned west along Arthur Street, following the highway out. Highway 61, meanwhile, started at the corner of Arthur Street (Hwy 11/17) and Kingsway and followed Kingsway and Ford Street to Frederica Street. This highway then followed Frederica Street west to James Street, where the highway headed south, crossing into Fort William First Nation reserve using a Swing Bridge built in 1906. At the terminus of James Street at present day Chippewa Road in the reserve, where the highway turns west, heading towards the US border. The current Highway 61/Chippewa Road intersection did not exist then and was one continuous roadway from the reserve to the border. Also, there was a Port Arthur branch of Highway 11/17, numbered Highway 11A/17A, starting at Cumberland Street and Red River Road in downtown Port Arthur, and headed west towards Sistonen’s Corners. This highway would be renumbered to Highway 102 west of the Thunder Bay Expressway in 1971 following the construction of the new corridor.

In 1963, Charles MacNaughton, minister of the Department of Highways, announced plans for the Lakehead Expressway to be built on the western edge of the twin cities of Port Arthur and Fort William (which amalgamated in 1970 to form Thunder Bay). Work began in August 1965, with a contract for a 5 kilometres (3 mi) section of divided highway on the west side of the twin cities. Plans called for a 28.2 kilometres (17.5 mi) at-grade expressway from South of Arthur Street to meet Highway 11 and Highway 17 northeast of the cities. The first section of the expressway opened on August 29, 1967, connecting Oliver Road (then part of Highway 130) and Golf Links Road with Dawson Road (Highway 102). By mid- to late 1969, the route had been extended to Highway 527 northeast of the twin cities. On the south end, it spanned from Highway 11 and Highway 17 (Arthur Street) to the site of the present intersection of Harbour Expressway and Golf Links Road. Golf Links Road provided an intermediate connection between the two completed segments. Eventually the segments were linked up, removing the present day Harbour Expressway and Golf Links Road from the expressway. By late 1970, the route had been extended southward from Arthur Street to Neebing Avenue / Walsh Street West. At this time, Highway 11/17 and Highway 61 were rerouted along the completed expressway. The old routes through Thunder Bay were redesignated as Highway 11B/17B and Highway 61B. However, these routes were decommissioned in 1998.

In 2003 plans were announced for the Shabaqua, a 13-kilometre (8 mi) bypass of Highways 11 and 17 to the north of the existing route along Arthur Street West, spanning from the intersection of Arthur Street and Vibert Road to the intersection of Harbour Expressway and Thunder Bay Expressway. The new bypass was opened on August 17, 2007; as a result, the southernmost 3.0 kilometres (1.9 mi) of the Thunder Bay Expressway was transferred to Highway 61, no longer part of Highway 11 nor Highway 17.

In 2025, City Council ordered a designated truck route, using this corridor and the Harbour Expressway, reallocating truck traffic onto this highway from Dawson Road.

== Future ==
The Thunder Bay Expressway was built originally with the intention to widen it into a full freeway with grade-separated interchanges throughout its length. Studies into building these interchanges began in the 1990s, only progressing into one interchange at Hodder Avenue. In 2013, studies resumed, with some ideas presented in 2015. In 2025, discussion into the rehabilitation project resumed, with results expected in September 2025. However, the timeline is disputed, as the province (responsible for the highways) requests that the Northwest Arterial Road (municipal project) be built first, but the city intends to build such, only if proper commitments towards the rehabilitation project are made.

The plans are to fully twin the highway and provide interchanges. The Balsam Street and Dawson Road interchanges will have partial cloverleaf interchanges. (Balsam Street interchange will also provide connections to Huron Avenue and Wardrobe Avenue). The John Street and Oliver Road intersections will be closed in favour of a realignment of Golf Links Road known as the “Northwest Arterial Road” which too will have a partial cloverleaf interchange. Finally, the Harbour Expressway junction will become a freeway to freeway interchange, making it smoother for trans-Canada traffic, while also providing ramps to Highway 61 towards Arthur Street and south of it.

== Major intersections ==
The following table lists the major junctions along Thunder Bay Expressway, as noted by the Ministry of Transportation of Ontario. The entire route is located in Thunder Bay. All exits are unnumbered.

| km | mi | Destinations | Notes |
|---|---|---|---|
| 0.0 | 0.0 | Highway 61 south / LSCT – Duluth Arthur Street | Thunder Bay Expressway designation ends; Highway 61 designation continues; Arthur Street formerly Highway 11B east / Highway 17B east |
| 3.0 | 1.9 | Highway 61 ends Highway 11 / Highway 17 / TCH west – Kenora/ Harbour Expressway east | Highway 61 northern terminus; Highway 11 / Highway 17 (Trans-Canada Highway) designation begins |
| 4.6 | 2.9 | Oliver Road | |
| | | Northwest Arterial Road | PROPOSED; To replace Oliver Road and John Street intersections upon twinning. |
| 7.7 | 4.8 | John Street | |
| 8.9 | 5.5 | Highway 102 (Dawson Road) west / Red River Road east | Dawson Road becomes Highway 102 at Strand Avenue, 300m west. |
| 10.9 | 6.8 | Huron Avenue | One-way off-ramp, eastbound. |
| 11.2 | 7.0 | Balsam Street | Highway is divided between km 11.6 and 15.2; formerly Highway 11B west / Highway 17B west |
| | | Wardrobe Avenue | PROPOSED; As part of Balsam Street interchange complementing Huron Avenue. |
| 15.3 | 9.5 | Copenhagen Road north / Hodder Avenue south Highway 11 / Highway 17 (Terry Fox Courage Highway) / LSCT / TCH east – Sault Ste. Marie, Cochrane | Only interchange in Northwestern Ontario; Thunder Bay Expressway designation ends; Highway 11/17 and Terry Fox Courage Highway designations continue. |
1.000 mi = 1.609 km; 1.000 km = 0.621 mi: Incomplete access; Proposed; Route transition
