= Garden River =

The Garden River is the name of several rivers and places in Canada:

- Garden River (Ontario) in Ontario
- Garden River, Alberta in Alberta
- Garden River 14, Ontario, a First Nations reserve
- Rural Municipality of Garden River No. 490 in Saskatchewan
