= Ontario Highway 61 =

Ontario provincial highway

Highway 61

- Highway 61 Major highways Secondary Highways

Route information
- Maintained by Ministry of Transportation of Ontario
- Length: 61.0 km (37.9 mi)
- History: Established August 18, 1917; Designated October 6, 1937
- Tourist routes: Lake Superior Circle Tour

Major junctions
- South end: MN 61 at the U.S. border near Grand Portage, MN
- Highway 130 north towards Twin City
- North end: Highway 11 / Highway 17 in Thunder Bay

Location
- Country: Canada
- Province: Ontario

Highway system
- Ontario provincial highways; Current; Former; 400-series
← Highway 60	→ Highway 62

King's Highway 61, commonly referred to as Highway 61 and historically known as the Scott Highway, is a provincially maintained highway in the Canadian province of Ontario. The 61-kilometre (38 mi) route connects the Pigeon River Bridge, where it crosses into the United States and becomes Minnesota State Highway 61, with a junction at Highway 11, Highway 17 and the Harbour Expressway in Thunder Bay. The highway forms part of the Lake Superior Circle Tour.

Highway 61 was added to the highway system on October 6, 1937, following the amalgamation of the Department of Northern Development into the Department of Highways. Prior to that it was known as the Scott Highway. The bridge over the Pigeon River was originally known as The Outlaw, as it was constructed without formal approval of the Canadian or American governments.

== Route description ==
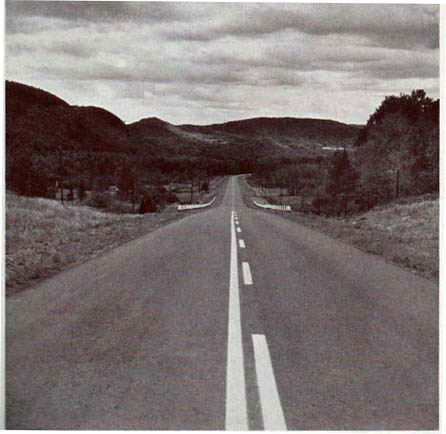
Highway 61 passes by mountain ranges north of the Pigeon River

Crossing the Canada–United States border, the Pigeon River Bridge is 480 kilometres (300 mi) west of the Sault Ste. Marie International Bridge and 480 kilometres (300 mi) east of the Fort Frances-International Falls International Bridge, and is near a visitor centre. Highway 61 begins at the Ontario-Minnesota border at the Pigeon River; the road continues south to Duluth as State Highway 61 on the American side. Proceeding north from the border, the route passes the customs station and curves to the north. Passing its former routing along Highway 593, the highway curves eastward to avoid mountains. It zig-zags around a range of mountains, eventually turning northward and passing to the west of Cloud Bay. The highway continues north for 20 kilometres (10 mi) through Neebing, running between mountain ranges on either side. It rises at Moose Hill, meets Highway 608 and enters one of the few agricultural areas in northwestern Ontario. Shortly thereafter, Highway 61 curves to the east, passing the southern terminus of Highway 130 along the way. It then enters the outskirts of Thunder Bay.

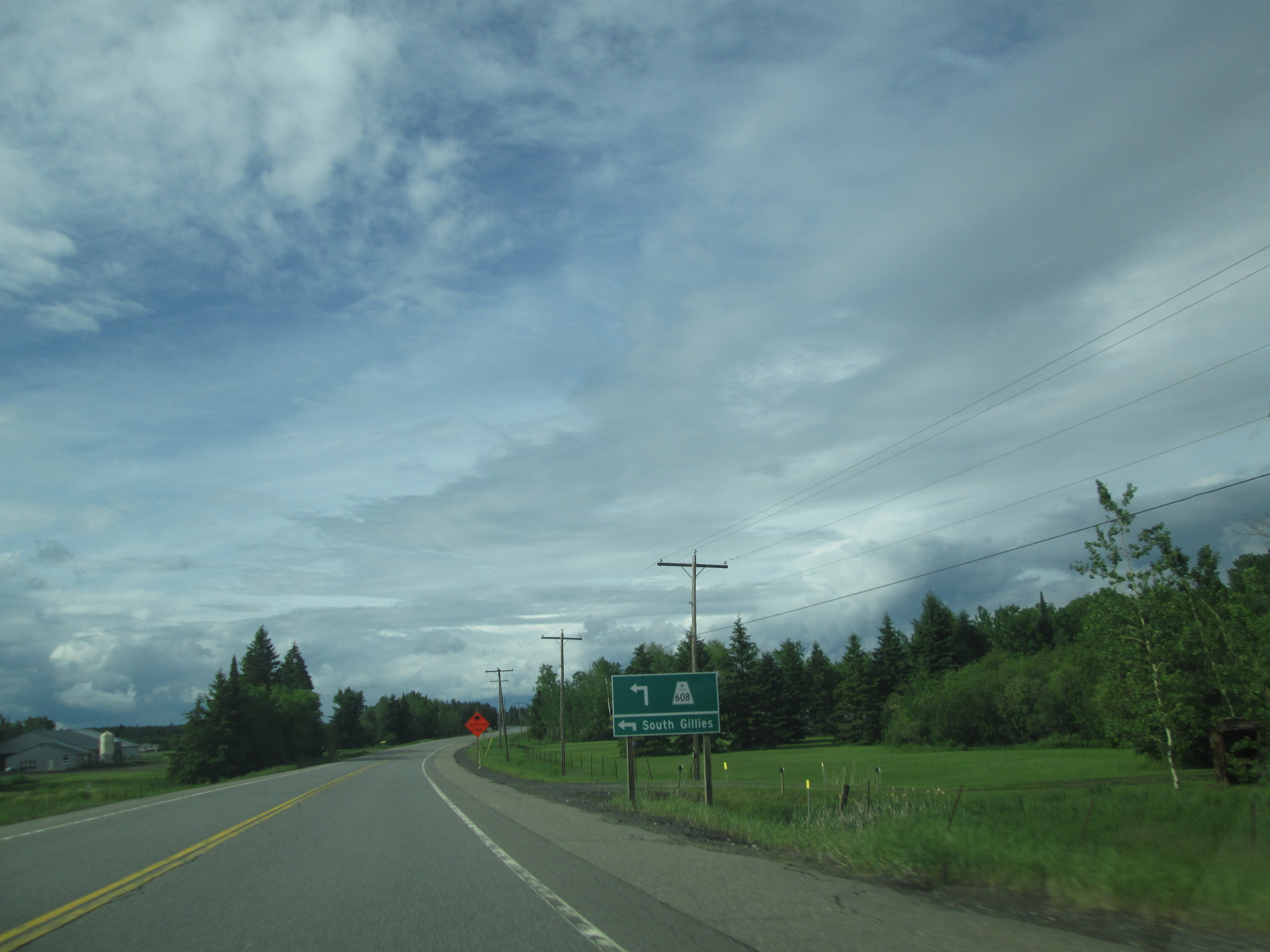
Highway 61 near Highway 608

The highway passes Chippewa Road, its former route through Thunder Bay, and returns to its northward orientation. It officially enters the city as it crosses the Kaministiquia River. The highway swerves east at Thunder Bay International Airport as it widens to four lanes then continues north, crossing Arthur Street. North of Arthur Street, the highway is also known as the Thunder Bay Expressway. It continues north for 3 km (1.9 mi) and ends at the Harbour Expressway and Trans-Canada Highway.

The northernmost section in Thunder Bay is a four-lane, undivided expressway. The remainder of Highway 61 is a conventional two-lane highway. Traffic volumes along the southern portion of the highway are generally low, with an annual average daily traffic (AADT) of 1,000 vehicles. This increases progressing north; within Thunder Bay the AADT peaks at 17,200 vehicles.

Highway 61 also forms a small portion of the Lake Superior Circle Tour, a tourist route of highways following the shoreline of Lake Superior. To the south, the tour continues along Minnesota State Highway 61; to the north it continues along Highway 17 towards Sault Saint Marie.

== History ==
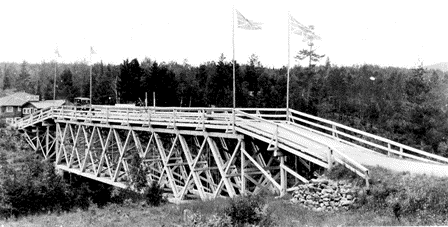
The original bridge over the Pigeon River was known as The Outlaw.

The road that would become Highway 61 was first constructed in 1916. The Pigeon River Timber Company had cleared lands surrounding the towns of Port Arthur and Fort William, but no road existed to connect to locations outside. A narrow wilderness trail reached as far as the Pigeon River, and was chosen as the route for the new road. The Department of Mines and Resources agreed to fund the project, and citizens proceeded to lay a new road as far as the river, beginning in 1913. This road was initially known as the "Scott Highway" after lumberman William Scott. On the opposite shore, Cook County and the State of Minnesota constructed a new road north from Grand Marais. The roads were completed by late 1916, but no bridge existed to connect them.

In response, the Rotary Clubs of Port Arthur and Duluth met to discuss a solution. As an international crossing, any bridge over the river would require federal approval from both governments. Both sides agreed that the approval process would be too slow, and decided to construct the bridge regardless. "The Outlaw" bridge was opened by a travelling motorcade on August 18, 1917, finally permitting travel between Ontario and Minnesota. To the surprise of the Rotary Clubs, J. E. Whitson, Roads Commissioner of Northern Ontario, and Howard Ferguson, Minister of Lands, Forest and Mines, were present at the opening, and agreed to pay the $768,000 ($16 million in 2025) bridge cost. The bridge and the Canadian road approaching it fell under the jurisdiction of the Department of Highways (now the Ministry of Transportation) on April 1, 1937, and the Scott Highway became Highway 61 on October 6. The Outlaw was rebuilt as a steel truss structure in 1934 following several accidents.

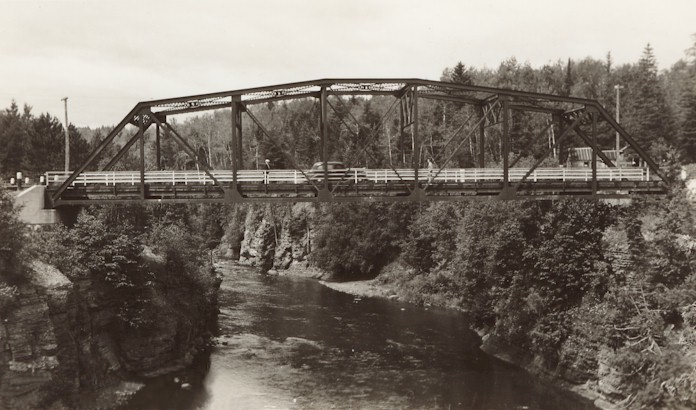
The Outlaw was replaced by this truss bridge in 1934. It remained in place until the new crossing opened in 1964.

By 1962, construction was underway to bypass the inland route of the highway as well as the bridge. This bypass opened on November 1, 1963; the American approach was rebuilt along the shore of Lake Superior, and a new bridge constructed over the river 10 km (6.2 mi) to the east. This bridge was opened on May 23, 1964. Highway 61 was realigned as a result; the former route was redesignated as Highway 593 on September 1, 1964.

In 1963, Charles MacNaughton, minister of the Department of Highways, announced plans for the Lakehead Expressway to be built on the western edge of the twin cities of Port Arthur and Fort William (which amalgamated in 1970 to form Thunder Bay). Construction began in the late 1960s and progressed rapidly. Following its completion by late 1970, Highway 61 was rerouted along it as far north as Arthur Street. The former route followed Chippewa Road, turned north on James Street and then east on Frederica Street. From there, it turned north along Ford Street and followed it and Kingsway to Highway 11 and Highway 17 at Arthur Street. This route was renumbered as Highway 61B; it remained in place into the 1990s, but was decommissioned by 1999.

Beginning in 1991, Highway 61 was completely reconstructed south of Thunder Bay to the border in preparation for the 1995 World Nordic Ski Championships. This involved replacing eight bridges, improving sightlines, and adding five passing lanes and paved shoulders throughout the length of the highway. The highway was extended 3 km (1.9 mi) to the north on August 17, 2007, when the Shabaqua Highway opened, redirecting Highway 11 and Highway 17 off Arthur Street.

== Major intersections ==
The following table lists the major junctions along Highway 61, as noted by the Ministry of Transportation of Ontario. The entire route is located in Thunder Bay District.

Location	km	mi	Destinations	Notes
Pigeon River	0.0	0.0	MN 61 south / LSCT – Duluth	Continuation into Minnesota at the Canada–United States border
Pigeon River	0.0	0.0	Pigeon River Bridge	
Neebing	0.0	0.0	Grand Portage–Pigeon River Border Crossing	
Neebing	3.1	1.9	Highway 593 north	
Neebing	35.3	21.9	Highway 608 west	
Oliver Paipoonge	40.0	24.9	Highway 130 north	
Thunder Bay	52.8	32.8	Chippewa Road	Formerly Highway 61B north
Thunder Bay	54.5	33.9	Broadway Avenue	
Thunder Bay	56.9	35.4	Neebing Avenue / Princess Street	
Thunder Bay	58.0	36.0	Arthur Street	Formerly Highway 11 west / Highway 17; formerly Highway 11B east / Highway 17B; Thunder Bay Expressway southern terminus
Thunder Bay	61.0	37.9	Highway 11 west / Highway 17 / TCH – Kenora, Fort Frances; Harbour Expressway east Highway 11 east / Highway 17 (Thunder Bay Expressway) / TCH – Cochrane, Sault Ste. Marie	Highway 61 northern terminus; roadway continues as Highway 11 east / Highway 17 (Thunder Bay Expressway)
1.000 mi = 1.609 km; 1.000 km = 0.621 mi

== Highway 61B ==
Highway 61B
- Location: Thunder Bay
- Length: 7.6 km (4.7 mi)
- Existed: 1968–1997

King's Highway 61B was established in 1968 through Fort William. The former route followed Chippewa Road, turned north on James Street and then east on Frederica Street. From there, it turned north along Ford Street and followed it and Kingsway, ending at Highway 11B and Highway 17B at Arthur Street. Highway 61B was decommissioned in 1997.

Highway 61B used James Street Swing Bridge over the Kaministiquia River, connecting Thunder Bay and Fort William First Nation. A fire on October 29, 2013, prompted CN Railway to close the James Street Swing Bridge; while rail service resumed crossing later that week, the bridge remained closed to vehicular and pedestrian traffic. After lengthy negotiations and legal proceedings between the City of Thunder Bay, CN Railway and the Fort William First Nation, the bridge was reopened to traffic in November 2019.

== See also ==
- Highway 61, a 1991 film by Canadian director Bruce McDonald.
- U.S. Route 61
