= Great Lakes Circle Tour =

Scenic drive

Great Lakes Circle Tour

Route information
- Existed: 1988–present

Location
- Country: United States

Highway system
- Great Lakes Circle Tour
- Illinois State Highway System; Interstate; US; State; Tollways; Scenic
- Indiana State Highway System; Interstate; US; State; Scenic
- Michigan State Trunkline Highway System; Interstate; US; State; Byways
- Minnesota Trunk Highway System; Interstate; US; State; Legislative; Scenic
- New York Highways; Interstate; US; State; Reference; Parkways
- Ohio State Highway System; Interstate; US; State; Scenic
- Ontario provincial highways; Current; Former; 400-series
- Pennsylvania State Route System; Interstate; US; State; Scenic; Legislative
- Wisconsin State Trunk Highway System; Interstate; US; State; Scenic; Rustic

The Great Lakes Circle Tour is a designated scenic road system connecting all of the Great Lakes and the St. Lawrence River. It consists of routes for circumnavigating the lakes, either individually or collectively. It was designated by the Great Lakes Commission in 1988.

== Tours ==
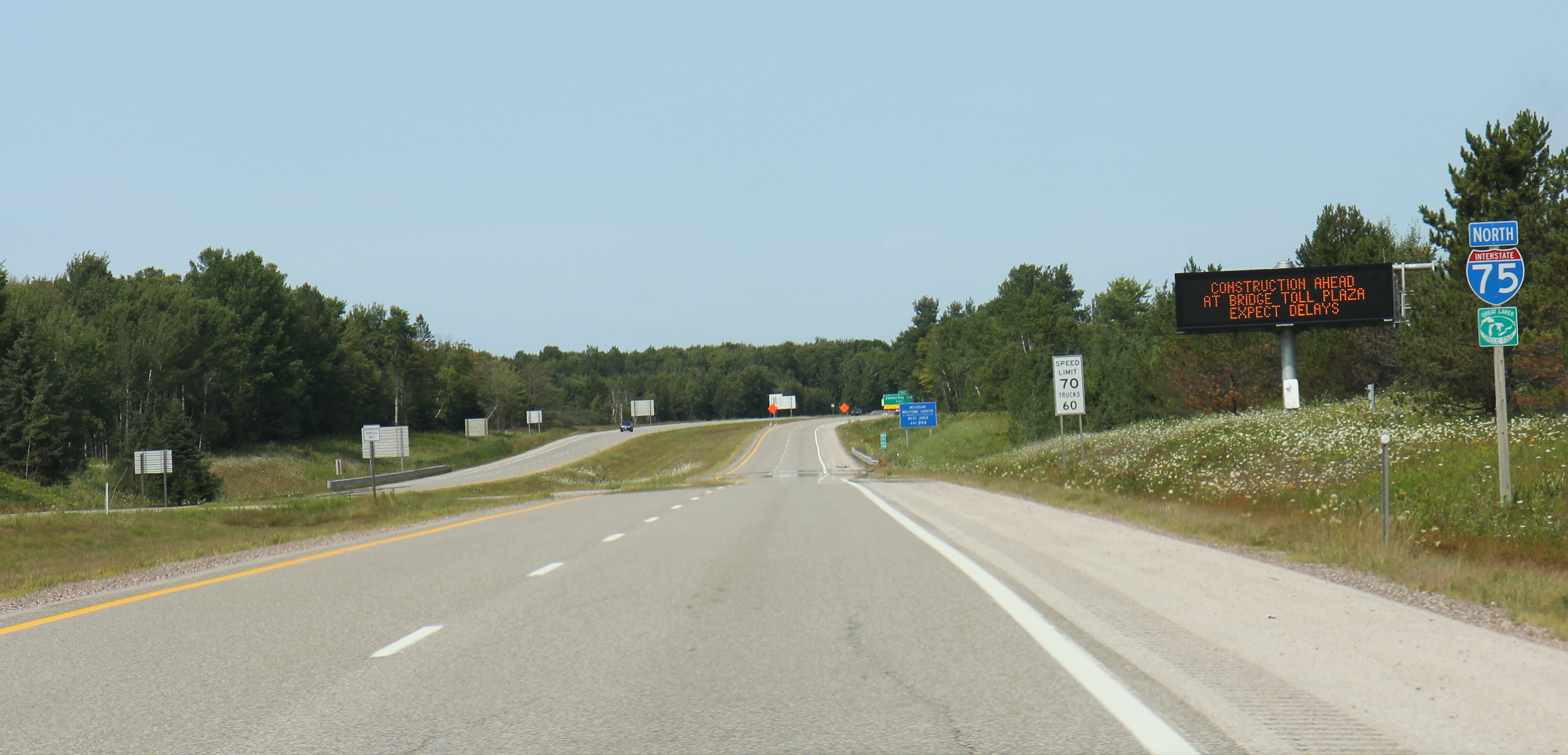
Great Lakes Circle Tour in northern Michigan

=== Lake Superior Circle Tour ===
Lake Superior Circle Tour
- Location: Around Lake Superior
- Length: 1,280.56 mi (2,060.86 km)
- Existed: 1988–present

The Lake Superior Circle Tour (LSCT) follows state and provincial highways that are nearby the lake to loop around the entirety of Lake Superior. The LSCT follows state highways in the US states of Michigan, Wisconsin, and Minnesota, and provincial highways in the Canadian province of Ontario.

==== Michigan ====
In Michigan, the tour runs from the state line at Ironwood to Sault Ste. Marie. In between it follows U.S. Highway 2 (US 2) to Wakefield, M-28 to Bergland and M-64 to Ontonagon. At Ontonagon, the LSCT continues east along M-38 to M-26. It follows M-26 to Houghton and then follows US 41 north to Copper Harbor. There is a loop route along M-203 between Hancock and Calumet. Travelers following the tour need to backtrack down US 41 to Houghton and then follow US 41 back to M-28 in Covington. US 41/M-28 carries the tour to Harvey where M-28 carries it eastward. There is a spur routing along M-77 running north from Seney to Grand Marais. The mainline tour departs from M-28 to loop northward along M-123 through Newberry to Paradise and back to M-28. Then it follows M-28 for a third time until reaching Interstate 75 (I-75) where it follows the freeway north to Sault Ste. Marie. It leaves Michigan on the Sault Ste. Marie International Bridge crossing into Ontario.

==== Ontario ====
Once in Ontario, the tour follows city streets through Sault Ste. Marie to Highway 17, the Trans-Canada Highway. It follows Highway 17 north along the mountainous shoreline through a remote region of Ontario. The highway curves to the west 190 miles (300 km) north of Sault Ste. Marie, and hugs the northern shore of the lake to Nipigon. It meets Highway 11, which is concurrent with Highway 17 thereafter. The tour follows the Thunder Bay Expressway through Thunder Bay. At the intersection of the Harbour Expressway, Highway 11/Highway 17 turns west; the tour continues south, now on Highway 61. Forty miles (60 km) south of Thunder Bay, the tour crosses the Pigeon River into Minnesota.

==== Minnesota ====
The LSCT follows Minnesota State Highway 61 (MN 61) between the Canada–United States border (near Thunder Bay) and the city of Duluth. In Duluth, the tour route follows I-35 southbound to the US 2 exit to Wisconsin.

==== Wisconsin ====
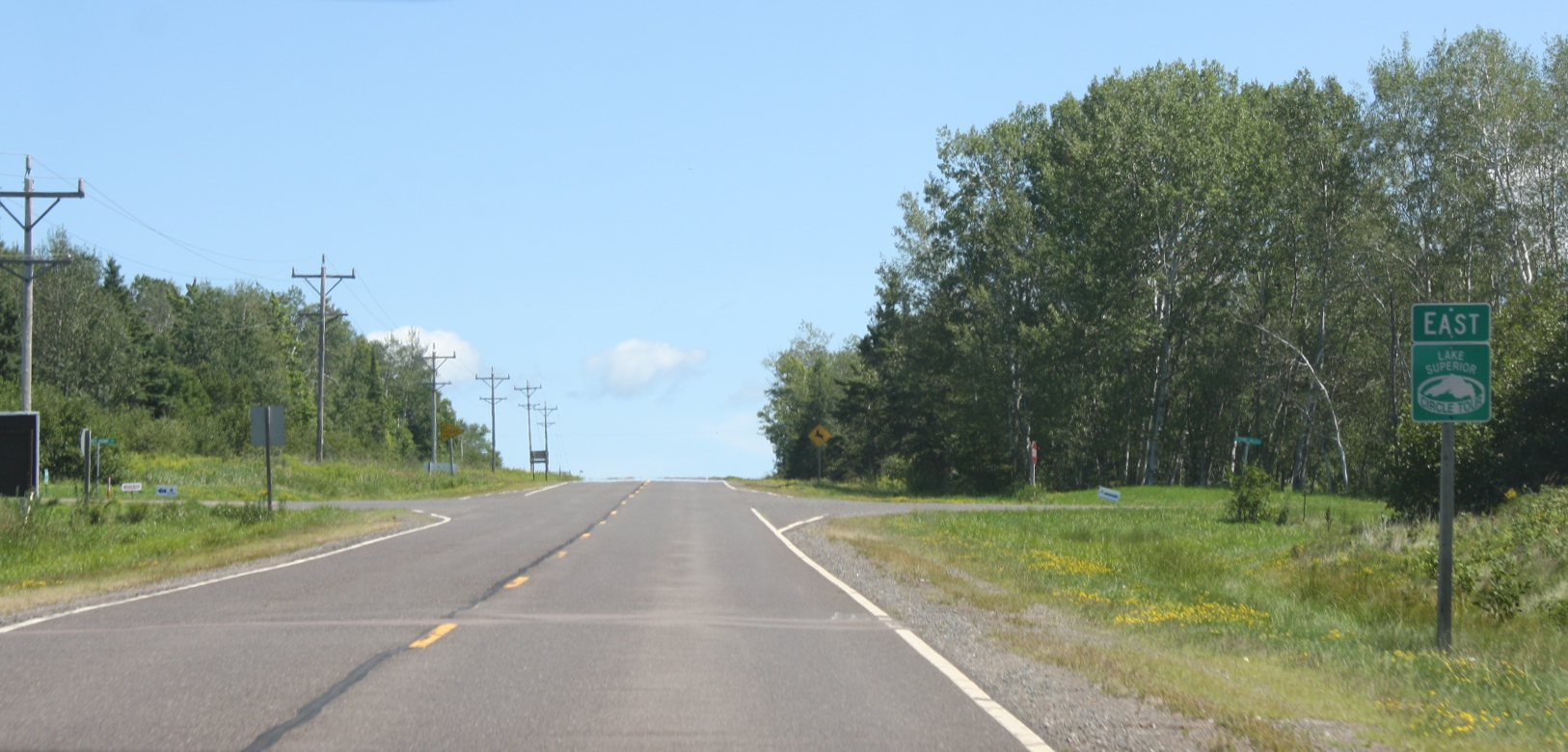
The Lake Superior Circle Tour in northern Wisconsin on Highway 13

The circle tour crosses into Wisconsin on the Bong Memorial Bridge carrying US 2 between Duluth, Minnesota and Superior, Wisconsin. In Superior, the tour route follows US 2/US 53 to Wisconsin Highway 13 (WIS 13). Near Ashland, the tour route returns to US 2 across Northern Wisconsin to Hurley and the border with Michigan at Ironwood.

=== Lake Michigan Circle Tour ===
Lake Michigan Circle Tour
- Location: Lake Michigan
- Existed: 1988–present

The Lake Michigan Circle Tour (LMCT) loops around Lake Michigan following state highways. These highways are usually the closest to the lake. The LMCT follows state highways in the US states of Illinois, Indiana, Michigan and Wisconsin. A special "spur route" follows the SS Badger ferry across the lake between Ludington, Michigan and Manitowoc, Wisconsin.

==== Illinois ====
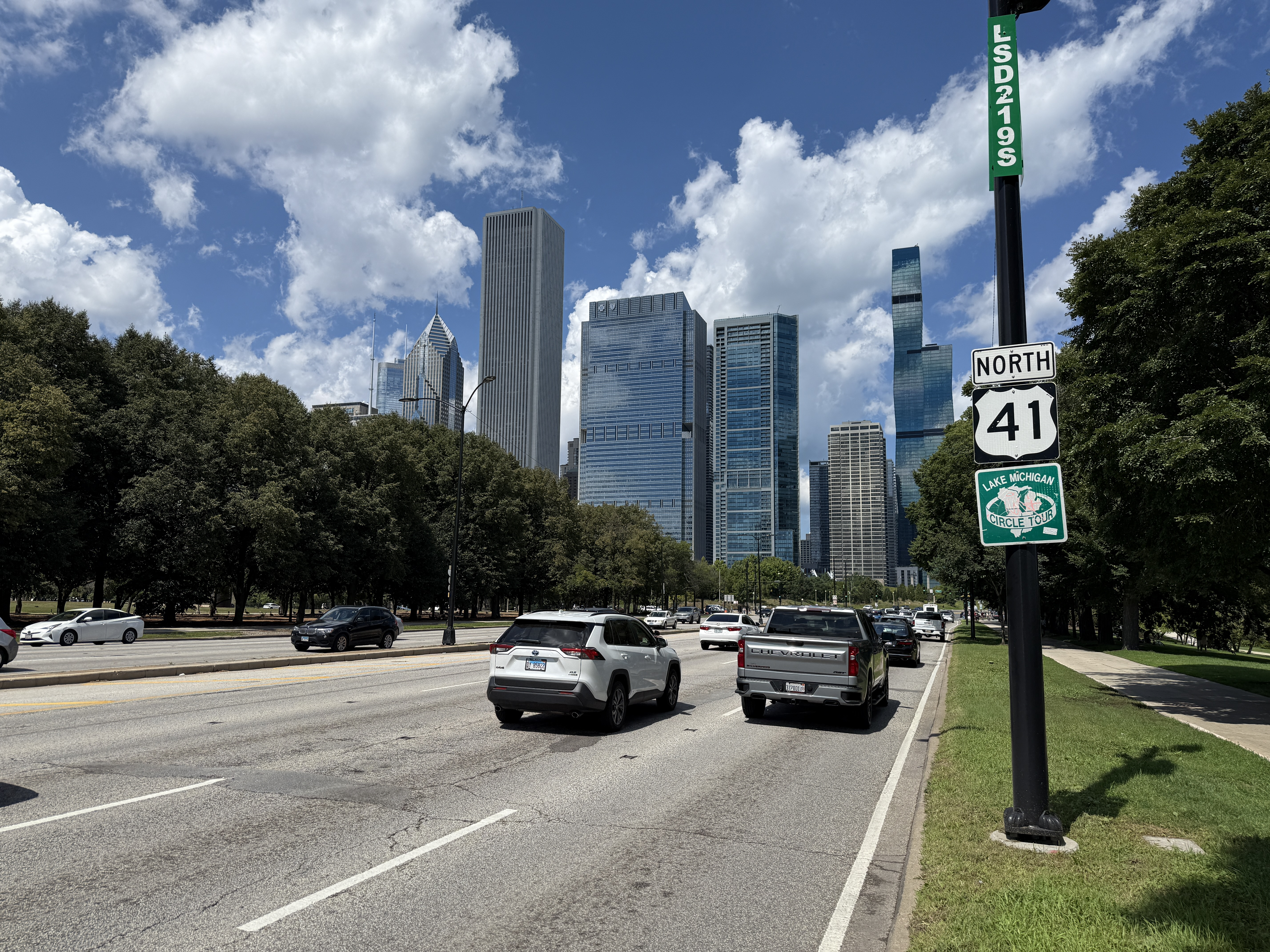
Lake Michigan Circle Tour along US 41 (Lake Shore Drive) in Chicago

The LMCT follows Illinois Route 137 from the Wisconsin state line south on Sheridan Road and joins Lake Shore Drive (US 41). The route then follows US 41 as US 12 and US 20 run concurrently but split quickly. The tour then follows US 12 into Indiana.

==== Indiana ====
The LMCT follows I-94 and US 12 in Indiana. The Indiana portion of the Lake Michigan Circle Tour is the urban stretch of the lake. It begins on the Illinois line in the City of Hammond. US 12 continues eastward through the 2nd most populous portion of the State of Indiana. The Gary-Hammond PMSA, a portion of the Chicago-Gary-Kenosha, IL-IN-WI Combined Statistical Area (CMSA) which includes all of Lake and Porter Counties. The third county along the shore, LaPorte County is in the South Bend CMSA. The only "rural" area is the ten miles (16 km) across northern Porter County, where route passes through Indiana Dunes National Park.

Starting from Chicago, US 12 enters Hammond, Indiana, before Whiting. Here, US 12, US 20 and US 41 all share Indianapolis Boulevard. Along the lakefront, is Lakefront Park and Whihala Beach County Park. Located here is the Horseshoe Casino. Whiting also provides easy access to Wolf Lake, which is a remnant of the wetlands and lakes that formed along the shores of Lake Michigan creating a massive wetlands on the Illinois and Indiana border.

US 12 turns more southerly as it passes west and south of Indiana Harbor, an industrial complex of mills, refineries, and docks. Entering East Chicago, US 12 turns east onto Columbus Drive, heading through the Indiana Harbor neighborhood of East Chicago. From East Chicago US 12 becomes Industrial Drive in Gary.

The alternate route for the Circle Tour is along I-94, which is joined with I-80 as the Borman Expressway. Entering Hammond the first stop could be the South Shore Welcome Center located on Kennedy Boulevard off the interstate. Hammond developed because of the wetlands and numerous lakes. The area was not considered suitable for farming or development, until the meat packing industry began to thrive in Chicago. With the creation of refrigerated rail cars, a source of ice was needed. The lakes of northern Indiana were seen as a source of that ice and meat packing moved across the line, creating processing plants and ice house.

Gary is on both routes of the Circle Tour. I-80/I-94 and US 12 both enter the city. US 12 is closer to the lake, entering from East Chicago on Industrial Drive. Named appropriately for the industries and the Gary Airport that developed along the lakefront. U.S. Steel's Gary Plant began in 1906, and brought major industries to this area. Located on the southern shore of Lake Michigan, the city offered direct access to the iron fields of northern Michigan and Minnesota and the coal fields of Ohio and West Virginia.

Following Industrial Drive, US 12 heads southeast, crossing under the Indiana Toll Road. At 4th Street, it turns east into downtown Gary. Downtown Gary is the home of the Railcats Minor League Baseball. Continuing east into the Miller community of Gary, and this is the closest the circle tour comes to the Chicago, South Shore and South Bend Railroad, the last interurban in the United States. Lake Street to the north will take motorists to Lake Michigan and over to Marquette Park, the first dune park along the Indiana Shore. Continuing on US 12, which is now called the Dunes Highway, the buildings end and forest and wetlands dominate. At County Line Road are the signs to Indiana Dunes National Park's West Beach facility and the east end of the Miller community. This is also the location for parking for the Marquette Hike/Bike trail.

Crossing County Line Road on US 12 you enter Portage, in Porter County. Portage owes its growth as a bedroom community to the creation of the Port of Indiana complex.

US 12 continues eastward as the Dunes Highway passing quickly through the town of Burns Harbor

Porter bills itself as the gateway to the Indiana Dunes. Its location with both Indiana Dunes State Park and Indiana Dunes National Park support their claim.

The Dunes Highway continues east into the town of Chesterton, which lies mostly south of US 12, US 20 and I-94.

Beverly Shores was a dune development of the Bartlett Family. Today, it is a residential community with remnants of the various development ideas used to lure home buyers into the dunes. Spanish Eclectic train depot and town hall, and the Old North Church with the Century of Progress Architectural District homes from the 1933 Chicago World's Fair are still present in this diverse architectural community.

Michigan City is just east of Beverly Shores after US 12/Dunes Highway has passed through the Town of the Pines, turned northward along County Line Road. As the Dunes Highway turns east into the Laporte County and the Michigan City limits, you come to the east end of Indiana Dunes National Park at Mount Baldy. The road continues as northeast toward Michigan leaving Indiana at Michiana Shores.

==== Michigan ====
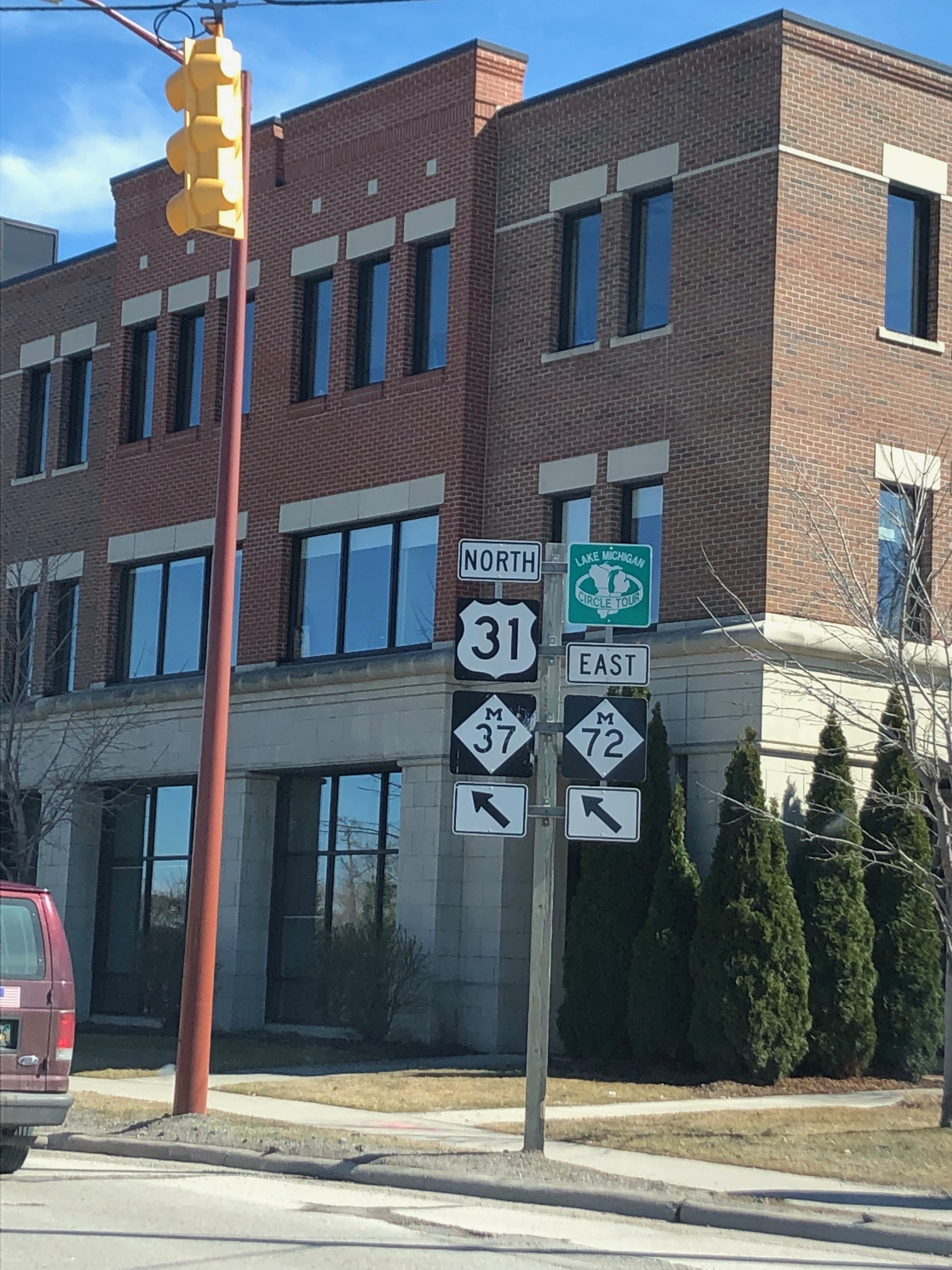
The Lake Michigan Circle Tour on the Grandview Parkway in Traverse City, Michigan

The LMCT enters Michigan in Berrien County along US 12. Near New Buffalo the tour switches to follow I-94 north to the Benton Harbor/St. Joseph area. Here the LMCT follows BL I-94 and M-63 back to the freeway, this time the I-196/US 31 freeway. At Holland, the LMCT turns onto BL I-196/US 31. Formerly it also followed BUS US 31 through Holland until that designation was removed. The Circle Tour continues to follow US 31 northward deviating at Muskegon and Montague–Whitehall for the various business loops. At Ludington, the Lake Michigan Circle Tour meets a '"connecting route" over the S.S. Badger carferry. The tour continues to follow US 31 to Manistee where it joins M-22 up and around the Leelanau Peninsula, with a special spur loop following M-109. It rejoins US 31 at Traverse City and follows US 31 to the northern terminus of US 31 south of Mackinaw City. There it runs along I-75 north to the Upper Peninsula of Michigan. The Lake Huron Circle Tour joins I-75 at the northern terminus of US 23 and both run together on I-75 over the Mackinac Bridge. North of the toll plaza in St. Ignace, The LHCT takes Exit 344A to follow BL I-75 while the LMCT takes Exit 344B to follow US 2.

In the Upper Peninsula, the circle tour follows US 2 westward to Rapid River. Here US 41 joins US 2. At Gladstone M-35 joins to form a three-way concurrency south to Escanaba. South of Escanaba, the circle tour follows M-35 to Menominee. Here M-35 ends and US 41 carries the circle tour south into Wisconsin. There is a "spur route" designated along M-183 and Delta County Road 483 on the Garden Peninsula.

==== Wisconsin ====
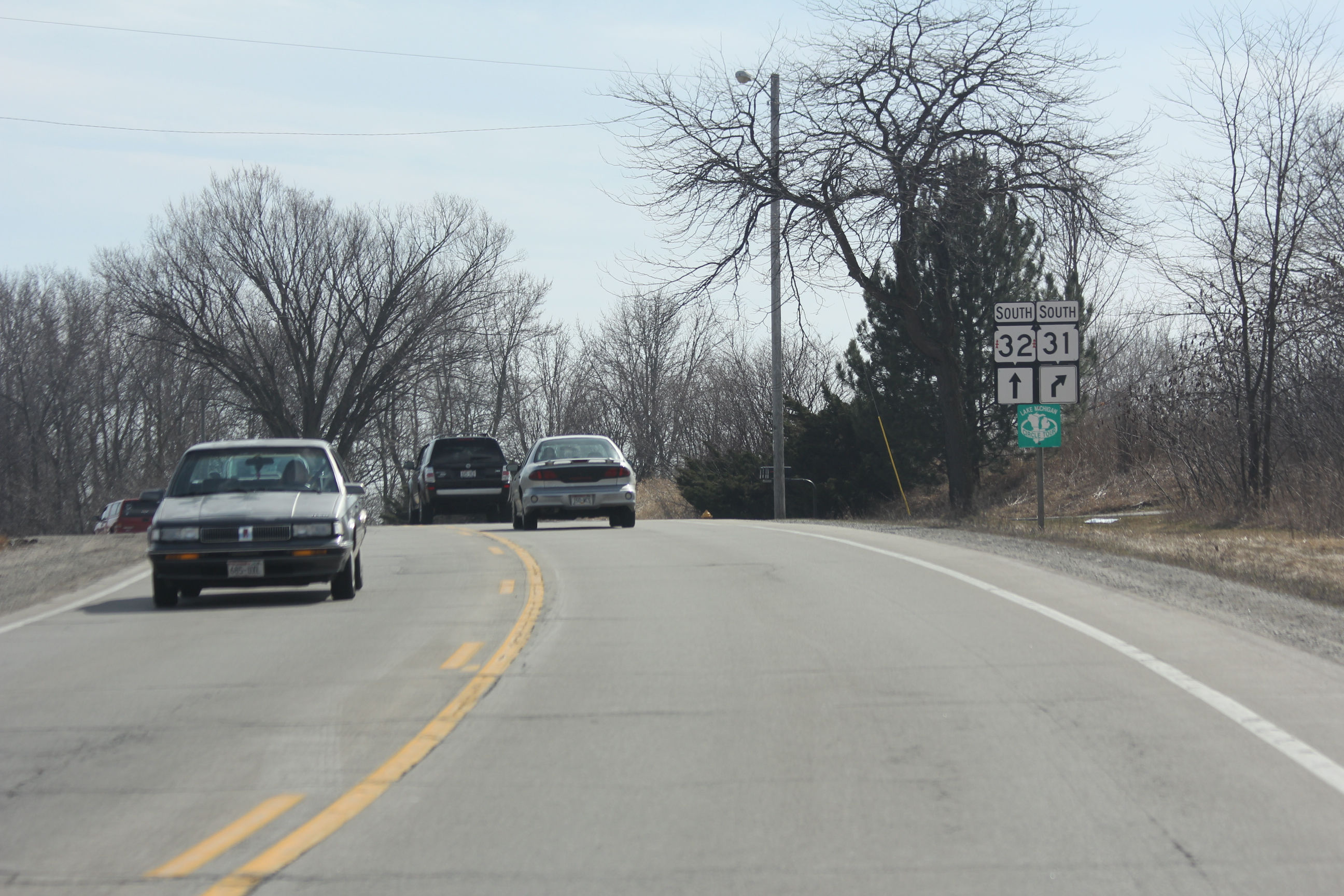
LMCT in southern Wisconsin concurrent with WIS 32

In Wisconsin, the LMCT follows US 41 south to I-43 in the Green Bay area. From I-43, it runs up into the Door Peninsula along WIS 57 and WIS 42 and back south to I-43. It continues along I-43 to Port Washington where it briefly follows WIS 32 for a few miles through Port Washington then back onto I-43 to Milwaukee where it re-joins WIS 32 to the state border.

=== Lake Huron Circle Tour ===
Lake Huron Circle Tour
- Location: Lake Huron
- Existed: 1988–present

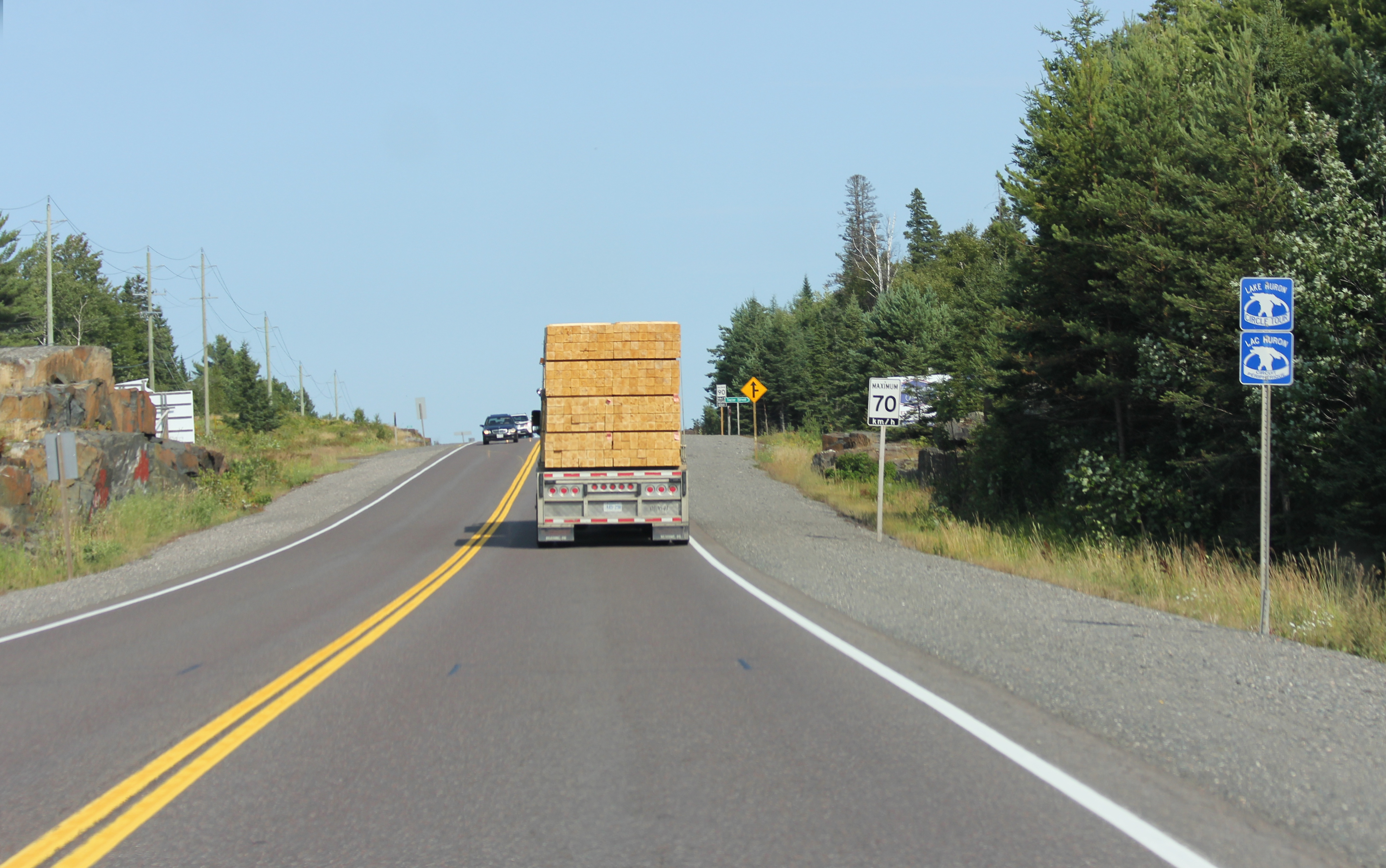
The Lake Huron Circle Tour near Sault Ste. Marie, Ontario

The Lake Huron Circle Tour (LHCT) progresses clockwise from a starting point at the Blue Water Bridge in Port Huron, Michigan–Sarnia, Ontario. The LHCT continues around Lake Huron, touching on locations including the following:

==== Michigan ====
- Bay City, Michigan
- Au Gres, Michigan
- Alpena, Michigan and the Thunder Bay National Marine Sanctuary
- The Mackinac Bridge
- The International Bridge at Sault Ste. Marie, Michigan-Sault Ste. Marie, Ontario

A Michigan spur route utilizes a segment of M-134 to DeTour Village.

==== Ontario ====
- Sudbury, Ontario
- Ontario's Bruce Peninsula and the Bruce Peninsula National Park

An Ontario spur route uses the MS Chi-Cheemaun ferry to cross the mouth of Lake Huron's Georgian Bay from the Bruce Peninsula to Manitoulin Island and return.

=== Lake Erie Circle Tour ===
Lake Erie Circle Tour
- Location: Lake Erie
- Length: 680 mi (1,090 km)
- Existed: 1988–present

The Lake Erie Circle Tour (LECT) loops around Lake Erie following state and provincial highways. These highways are usually the closest to the lake. The LECT follows state highways in the US states of New York, Pennsylvania, Ohio, and Michigan and provincial highways in the Canadian province of Ontario.

==== Michigan ====
Starting in Detroit, the LECT follows Interstate 75 (I-75) south from the Ambassador Bridge to exit 43. There it follows M-85 through Lincoln Park to Trenton. At exit 28, the LECT rejoins I-75 and runs south through Monroe to the state line, crossing into Toledo, Ohio.

==== Ohio ====
Crossing into the state of Ohio, the LECT leaves I-75 to follow I-280 around the east side of Toledo. The tour then exits I-280 and runs along SR 2 to the city of Sandusky, home of Cedar Point. There it joins U.S. Route 6 (US 6) to Cleveland. West of Cleveland, US 6 merges with US 20 and SR 2 in a three-way concurrency. The LECT will continue to follow SR 2 through downtown Cleveland. On the east side of the city, the tour continues on SR 283 through Euclid to Painesville. There it merges onto US 20 until Geneva. The tour follows SR 531 east along the lake between Geneva and Conneaut, where it returns along US 20 east to the state line.

==== Pennsylvania ====
The LECT follows Pennsylvania Route 5 through Erie County. This is also the routing of the Seaway Trail.

==== New York ====
Entering New York, the road becomes New York State Route 5 to Buffalo. There it follows the Peace Bridge to Ontario.

==== Ontario ====
The LECT follows Ontario Highway 3 through the province, running the entire length from the Peace Bridge to the Ambassador Bridge.

=== Lake Ontario and Seaway Trail ===
Seaway Trail
- Location: Ohio–Pennsylvania state line to Canada–United States border
- Length: 518 mi (834 km)
- Existed: 1978–present

Unlike the other four Great Lakes, Lake Ontario is posted not as a circle tour but as part of the US-only Seaway Trail. The trail begins in Erie County, Pennsylvania and travels through Buffalo, Niagara Falls, Rochester, Oswego, and Ogdensburg before ending at the Seaway International Bridge near Massena.

== History ==
Plans for the Great Lakes Circle Tours were started in 1985. The Michigan Department of Transportation (MDOT) was in consultation with its counterparts in Wisconsin (WisDOT), Minnesota (MnDOT) and Ontario (Ministry of Transportation of Ontario, MTO) in May 1986 to establish a tour route around Lake Superior. The project was started by Paula Blanchard, the First Lady of Michigan at the time. She was an adviser to the Michigan Department of Commerce and called for the formation of the tour in the fall of 1985 at a tourism conference. Representatives from the three states and province agreed to the plan. Michigan drafted the first design for the signs in early 1986, sending the design to the other governments for approval. The Great Lakes Commission approved the formation of a Great Lakes Circle Tour in November 1988.

== Gallery ==
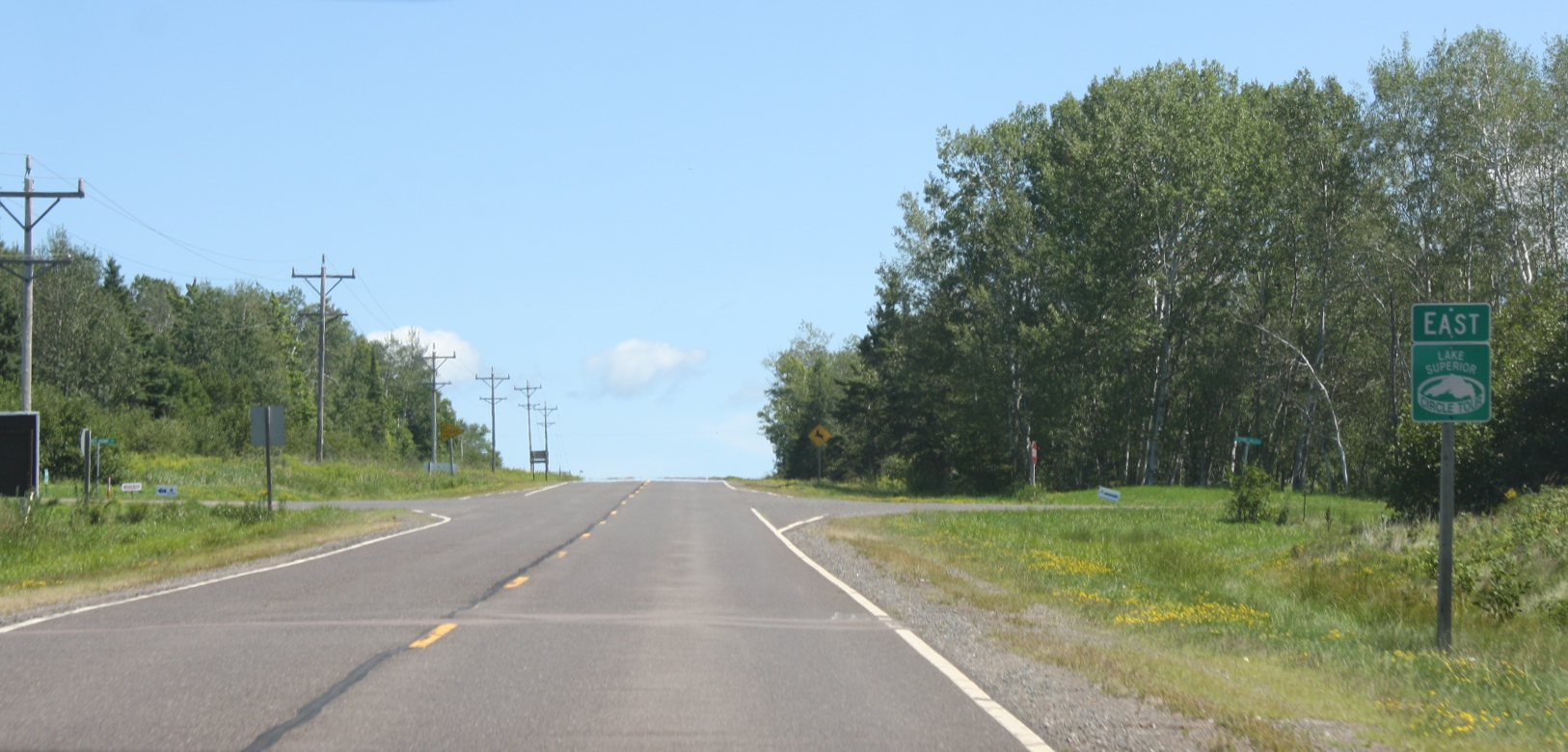
The Lake Superior Circle Tour in northern Wisconsin on WIS 13

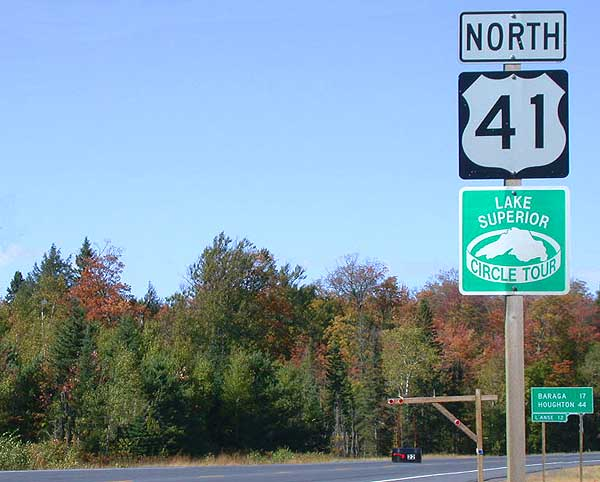
US 41 near the junction with US 141/M-28

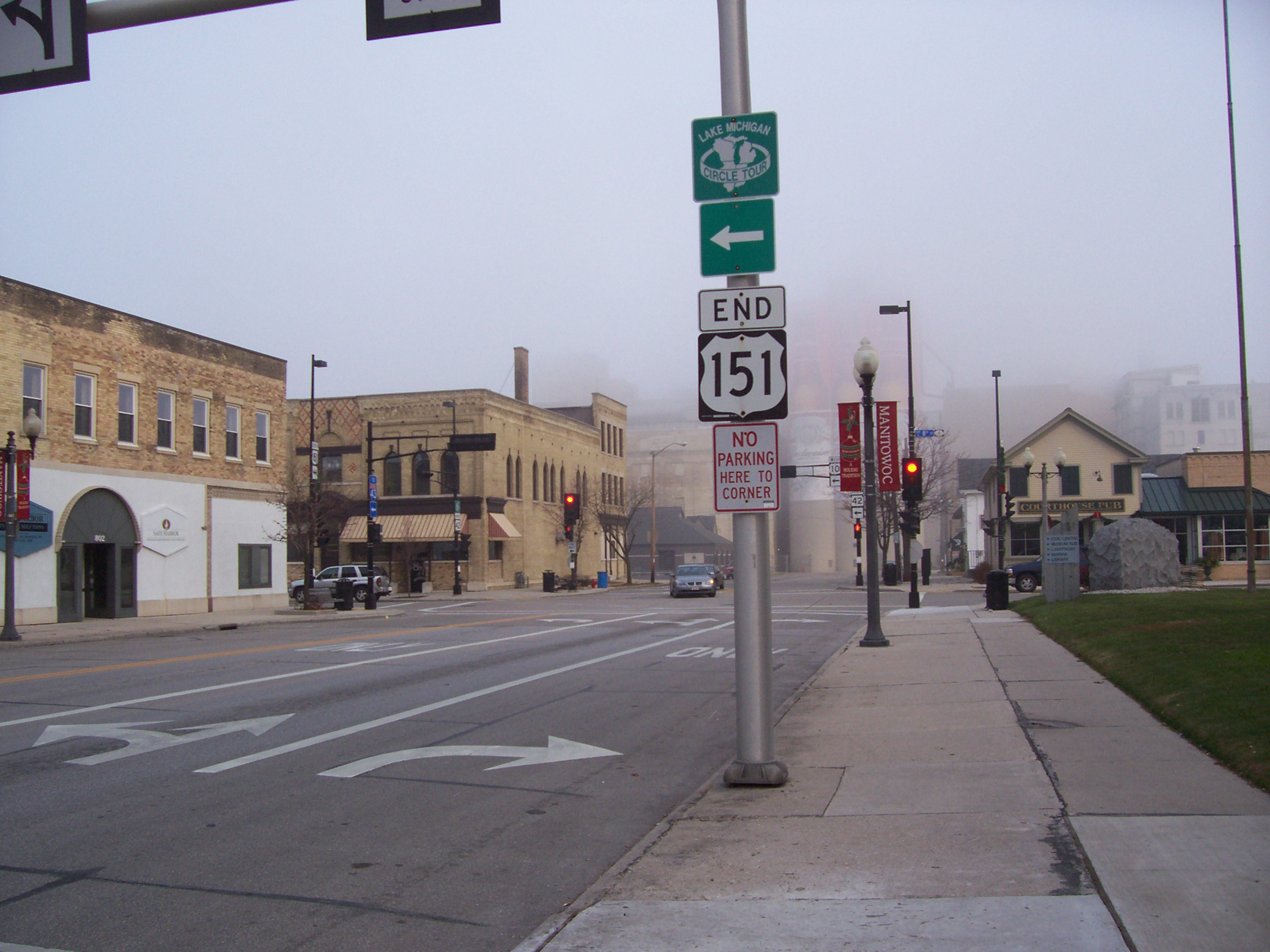
Lake Michigan Circle Tour near US 10's crossing in Manitowoc, Wisconsin

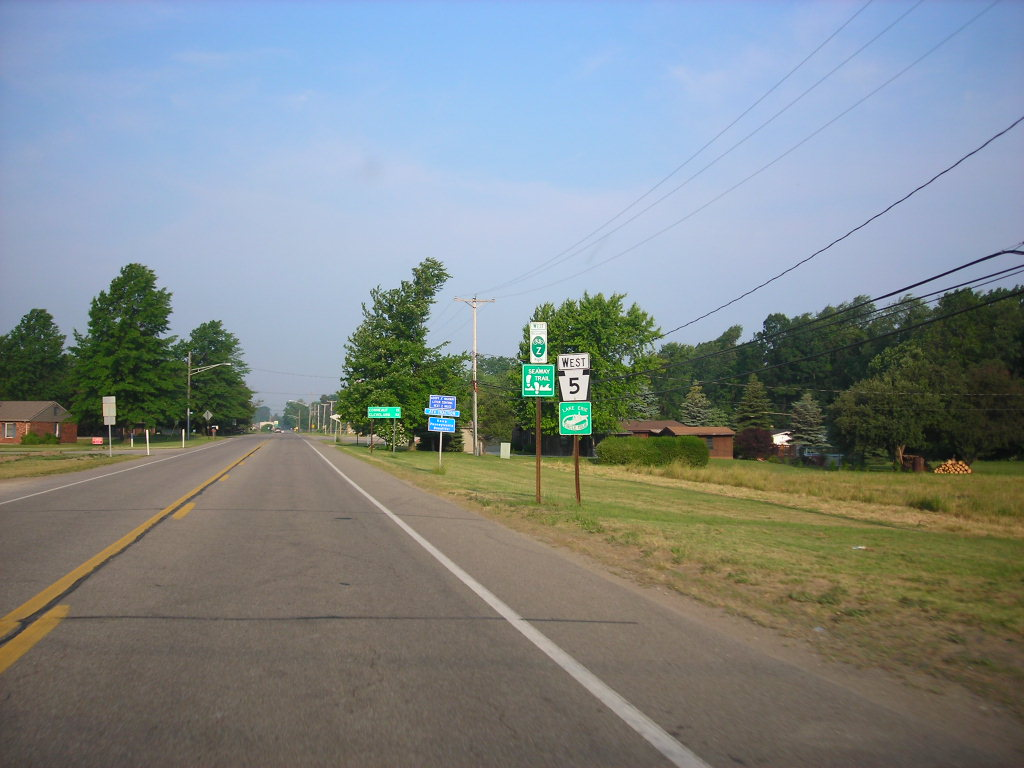
Lake Erie Circle Tour along PA 5 in Erie County, Pennsylvania, which is also part of the Seaway Trail and BicyclePA Route Z

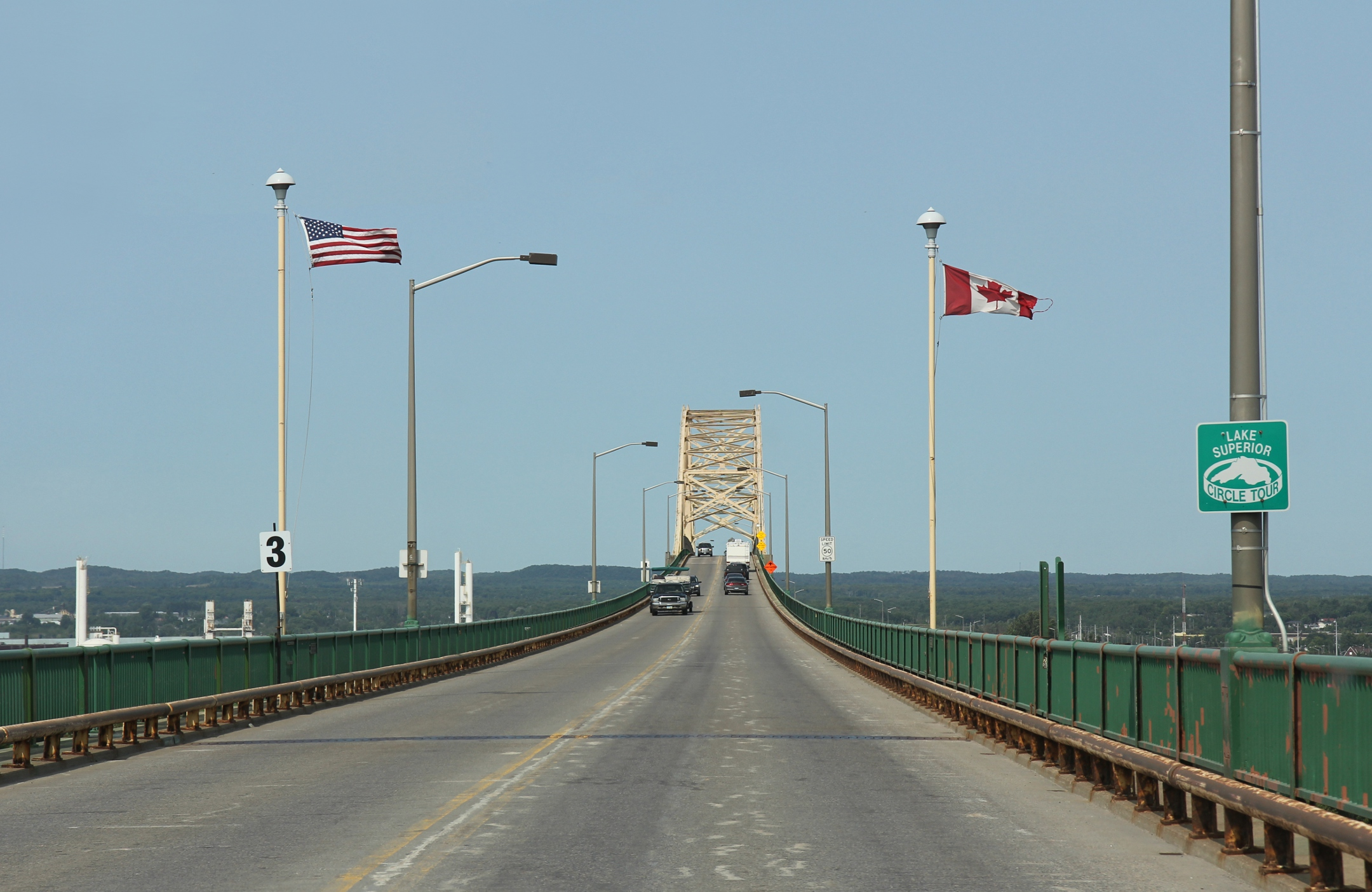
Lake Superior and Lake Huron Circle Tours cross the Sault Ste. Marie International Bridge

== Works cited ==
- Indiana 2009 Travel Guide. Indianapolis: State of Indiana. 2009.
- Northwest Indiana Bike Map (Map) (Spring ed.). Northwestern Indiana Regional Planning Commission. 2008.
- Indiana (Map). Delormes Maps.
