= Ontario Highway 638 =

Ontario provincial highway

Highway 638

Route information
- Maintained by Ministry of Transportation of Ontario
- Length: 51.0 km (31.7 mi)
- Existed: March 29, 1962–present

Major junctions
- Northwest end: Highway 17B in Echo Bay
- Highway 17 / TCH in Echo Bay; Highway 670 at Ophir
- Southeast end: Bruce Mines north limits

Location
- Country: Canada
- Province: Ontario
- Towns: Echo Bay, Bruce Mines
- Villages: Sylvan Valley, Leeburn, Ophir, Rydal Bank, Bruce Station

Highway system
- Ontario provincial highways; Current; Former; 400-series
← Highway 637	→ Highway 639

Secondary Highway 638, commonly referred to as Highway 638, is a provincially maintained secondary highway located in the District of Algoma in the Canadian province of Ontario. The route begins at Highway 17B in Echo Bay and travels eastward to Ophir, where it turns south to Bruce Mines, ending 1.1 km (0.7 mi) north of Highway 17. The north–south portion of the route was designated in 1956 as Highway 561. In 1962, Highway 638 was designated from Echo Bay to Highway 561, as well as a segment of the latter route from Ophir to Dunns Valley. The highway took on its current routing in 1989, assuming the route of Highway 561 south from Ophir to Bruce Mines; the section of Highway 638 from Ophir to Dunns Valley was renumbered as Highway 670.

== Route description ==
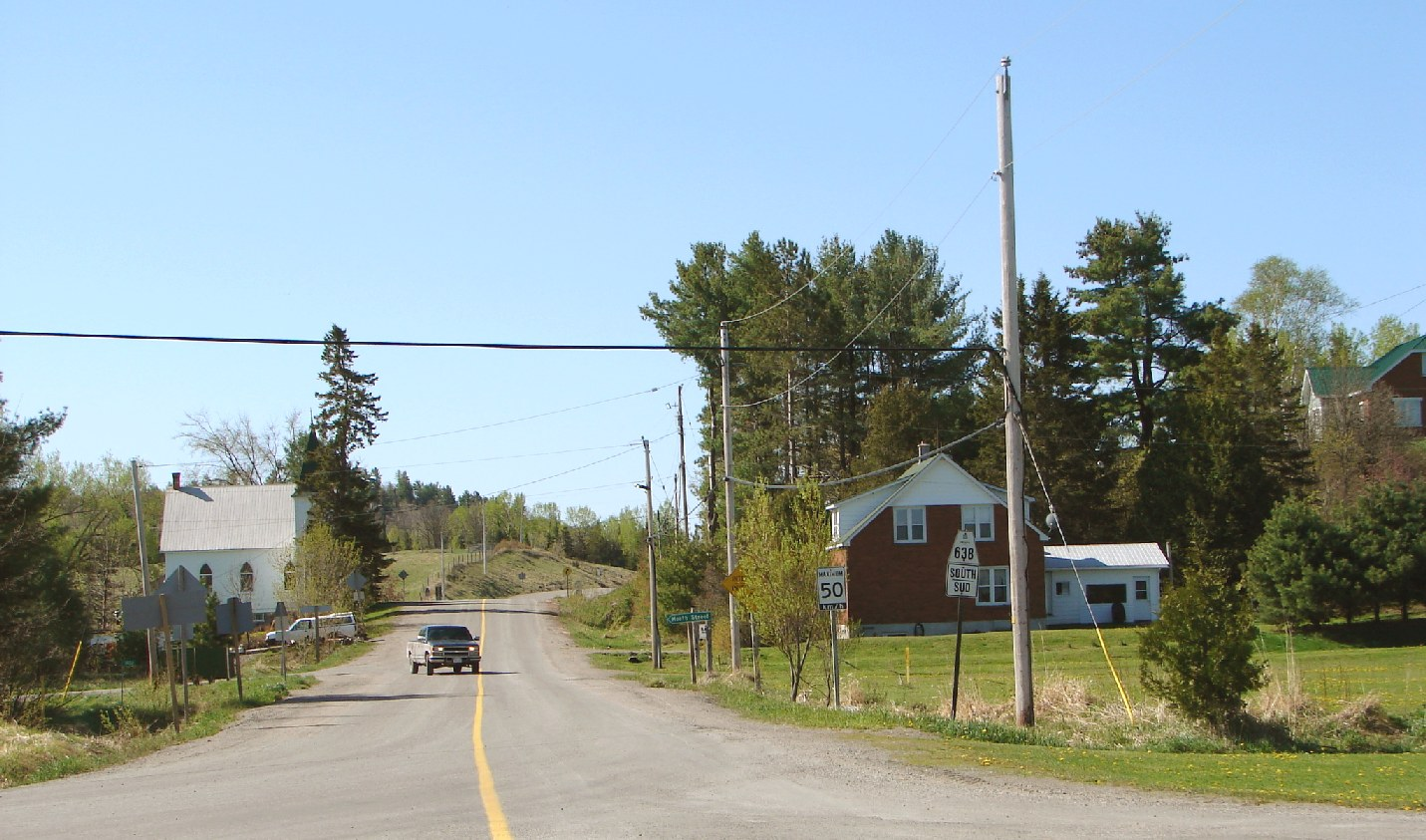
Highway 638 in Rydal Bank

Highway 638 is 51.3 kilometres (31.9 mi) in length, extending from Highway 17B in Echo Bay eastward through the communities of Sylvan Valley, Leeburn and Ophir, where it turns southward and runs south through Rydal Bank, Bruce Station, and finally to its southeastern terminus at Highway 17 in the town of Bruce Mines. On an average day, approximately 520 vehicles use the highway at the southern terminus, while approximately 420 vehicles use the highway at the northern terminus. These represent the heaviest and lightest travelled portions of the route, respectively.

Beginning at Highway 17B in Echo Bay, where it is known as Church Street, Highway 638 proceeds east, immediately crossing the Huron Central Railway. It intersects the four lane Highway 17 bypass then enters an expanse of forest. It descends into the Sylvan Valley, where it is surrounded by rolling farmland backed by tree-lined ridges. Sylvan Valley is locally renowned for "The Golden Mile", a long stretch of sunflowers planted annually alongside the highway by farmer Lynn Orchard since 2013. Rising out of the valley, Highway 638 enters thick boreal forests as it meanders eastward through an area dotted with small lakes. Gradually the forests give way to farmland as the route approaches the community of Leeburn. East of Leeburn the highway passes several large rock outcroppings before encountering Poplar Dale Road, where it turns south into Ophir.

In Ophir, Highway 670 branches east towards Dunn's Valley. Highway 638 continues south along the eastern side of Rock Lake, surrounded by thick forests until it approaches the community of Rydal Bank, where the forest give way to farmland. The route meanders southwest into Bruce Station, where it again crosses the Huron Central Railway. Provincial maintenance of Highway 638 ends south of Bruce Station at Trunk Road, 1.1 km (0.7 mi) north of Highway 17. However, the highway is signed south to Highway 17.

== History ==
The first section of today's Highway 638 was designated as Highway 561. The route, assigned in the mid-1950s alongside many of the secondary highways in the province, travelled north from Bruce Mines to Ophir, where it turned east to Dunns Valley then north to Skookum Lake. The Department of Highway (DHO), predecessor to the modern Ministry of Transportation (MTO), assumed the Bruce Mines–Dunn Valley Road on May 9, 1956. On March 29, 1962, Highway 638 was assumed, travelling from Echo Bay to Highway 561. In addition, the portion of Highway 561 between Ophir and Dunns Valley was renumbered as part of the new route; the section north of the Wanamaker Creek bailey bridge in Dunns Valley to Skookum Lake was decommissioned. This routing remained consistent until mid- to late 1989, when the remaining 20.9 km (13.0 mi) of Highway 561 was renumbered as part of Highway 638. The 9.5 km (5.9 mi) segment of Highway 638 between Ophir and Dunns Valley was renumbered as Highway 670 at the same time. The 1.1 km (0.68 mi) portion of Highway 638 through Bruce Mines was transferred from the province to the town on January 1, 1998.

=== Highway 17B ===
From 2007 to 2009, Highway 638 extended for an additional 15.9 km (9.9 mi) westerly from Echo Bay a junction with Highway 17 in Sault Ste. Marie. The extendion between Echo Bay and Sault Ste. Marie was the former alignment of Highway 17, the route of the Trans-Canada Highway through the region. It was redesignated as part of Highway 638 when Highway 17 was rerouted along a four-lane expressway alignment that opened on October 31, 2007. The former alignment of Highway 17 was renumbered, with the 4.9 km (3.0 mi) portion south of Echo Bay becoming Highway 638A, and the 15.9 km (9.9 mi) portion northwest of Echo Bay becoming an extension of Highway 638.

However, the Garden River First Nation, citing a 1909 order in council whereby ownership of the highway reverts to the band after realignment, sought to have the route numbered as Highway 17B. The municipal council of Sault Ste. Marie passed a municipal resolution several weeks later which supported the position of Garden River. In 2008 both Highway 638A and the extension of Highway 638 were renumbered as Highway 17B.

== Future ==
The safety of the current at-grade intersection at Highway 17 has been called into question by local residents. In February 2011, the Ministry of Transportation announced that this crossing will be upgraded to a full interchange.

== Major intersections ==
The following table lists the major junctions along Highway 638, as noted by the Ministry of Transportation of Ontario. The entire route is located in Algoma District.

Location	km	mi	Destinations	Notes
Echo Bay	0.0	0.0	Highway 17B north – Garden River	Access to Ojibways of Garden River First Nation
Echo Bay	1.8	1.1	Highway 17 – Sault Ste. Marie	Trans-Canada Highway. At-grade intersection with divided expressway; grade-separated interchange planned.
Echo Bay	3.1	1.9	Lakeview Drive	
Sylvan Valley	8.4	5.2	Cemetery Road	
Ophir	30.3	18.8	Poplar Dale Road	Highway turns from east–west to north–south orientation
Ophir	31.3	19.4	Highway 670 – Dunns Valley	
Rydal Bank	43.6	27.1	Thessalon River bridge	
Bruce Mines	51.0	31.7	Trunk Road	End of provincial maintenance
Bruce Mines	52.1	32.4	Highway 17 – Sudbury	Trans-Canada Highway
1.000 mi = 1.609 km; 1.000 km = 0.621 mi
