= David B. Williams (artist) =

Canadian Ojibway aboriginal artist (1947-2009)

- Born: December 26, 1947; Sault Ste. Marie, Ontario
- Died: September 29, 2009 (aged 61); Winnipeg, Manitoba
- Occupation: Artist

David B. Williams (1947-2009) was a Canadian Ojibway aboriginal artist.

Originally from Garden River First Nation just outside Sault Ste. Marie, Ontario, David resided much of his adult life in Saskatoon, Saskatchewan and Winnipeg, Manitoba. David B. Williams was born December 26, 1947, and died September 29, 2009, at the age of 62 in Winnipeg and is buried at the Garden River First Nation.

He was a painter and printmaker.

== Solo exhibitions ==
- 1979 – Gallery One – Saskatoon. Saskatchewan
- 1980 – Gallery One – Saskatoon. Saskatchewan
- 1982 – First Man Art Gallery – Calgary. Alberta
- 1986 – The Trading Post – Saskatoon. Saskatchewan
- 1987 – The Trading Post – Saskatoon. Saskatchewan

== Grants and awards ==
- 1979 – Canada Council Grant (Explorations)
- 1983 – Manitoba Arts Council Grant
- 1987 – Indian Arts and Crafts Manitoba Inc.

== Special presentations ==
- 1980 – Purchase on behalf of Native Law Society of University of Saskatchewan for presentation to Mr. Justice Berger. Supreme Court Justice of B.C.
- 1980 – Purchase of City of Saskatoon for special presentation to the Saskatoon Curling Team winning the Silver Broom Bonspiel.
- 1984 – Syncrude Oil Corporation.
- 1986 – Purchased (a print) by Saskatchewan Mining and Development Corporation for the John Howard Society Native Art Auction Saskatoon. Saskatchewan.
- 1987 – Métis National Council presented to Pope John Paul at Fort Simpson, NWT
- 1987 – Peace Hill Trust. Edmonton. Alberta

== Principal collections ==
- Mendell Art Gallery – Saskatoon. Saskatchewan.
- Saskatchewan Arts Board – Regina. Saskatchewan.
- Shell Oil Corporation – Calgary. Alberta
- Gulf Oil Corporation – Calgary. Alberta
- Canada Council Art Bank – Ottawa. Ontario (1982)
- Department of Indian Affairs – Ottawa. Ontario (1983)
- Province of Manitoba – (print – 1983)
- Suncor Oil Corporation – fort McMurray. Alberta (1983)
- Interprovincial Pipeline Corporation – Edmonton. Alberta (1984)
- National Museum – Ottawa. Ontario
- Manitoba Government – Winnipeg. Manitoba
- Peace Hill Trust – Winnipeg. Manitoba
- Denver Museum of Fine Arts – Denver. Colorado (U.S.A.)
- Denver Museum of Fine Arts – Denver. Colorado (U.S.A.)
- Peace Hill Trust – Edmonton. Alberta
- Aboriginal Centre of Winnipeg – Winnipeg. Manitoba
- Indian Family Centre – Winnipeg. Manitoba

== Professional affiliations ==
- C.A.R.F.A.C. (Manitoba) (1995)
- Indian Crafts and Arts Manitoba Inc. (1988)
- National Symposium of Indian Art – Hazeleton. B.C. (August 1983) unable to attend. Forwarded five artist proof prints to be sold for the express purpose of a proposed National Indian Arts Scholarship now under study by a steering committee.

== Reviews and interviews - publications ==
- "Accent on the Arts" – Star-Phoenix – Saskatoon. Saskatchewan (Saturday. October 13. 1979)
- "Woodsmoke and Sweetgrass" CKY Television – Winnipeg. Manitoba (Interviewed December 1982 – Aired January 1983)
- "The Beaver" – A Hudson Bay Co. Publication (Winter Edition issued for January 1982)
- B.B.C September 1985

== Art auction/benefit ==
- Second National Native Art Auction. Native Canadian Centre of Toronto (April 1982) – Toronto. Ontario (Refer to catalogue of painting – 1982)
- Manitoba Museum of Man and Nature – Winnipeg. Man. (January 1983) (Group show auction/benefit)
- First Annual Native Art Auction – Saskatoon. Saskatchewan (John Howard Society)

Art 86 – Brantford. Ontario (Mohawk Institute)

- Second Annual Native Art Auction – Saskatoon. Saskatchewan (John Howard Society)

== Public exhibitions (donations) ==
- Native Pavilion. Indian Friendship Centre. Saskatoon Folkfest. Saskatoon. Saskatchewan (1981)
- Native Pavilion Indian and Métis Friendship Centre. Winnipeg Folklorama – Winnipeg, Manitoba (1983)
- Native Pavilion. Indian Friendship Centre. Saskatoon Folkfest – Saskatoon. Saskatchewan (1986)

== School exhibitions (public, private, native) ==
- David Livingstone Community School – Winnipeg. Manitoba (1983)
- St. Michael's Community School – Saskatoon. Saskatchewan (1982)
- Prince Philip Elementary School – Saskatoon. Saskatchewan (1982)
- Lester B. Pearson Public School – Saskatoon. Saskatchewan (1981)
- Native Survival School – Saskatoon. Saskatchewan (1981)
- Father Vachon Catholic School. Saskatoon. Saskatchewan (1981)

== Group exhibitions ==
- 1980 – Saskatchewan Open Mendel Art Gallery. A juried Biennial exhibition of Saskatchewan art work was purchased by the Saskatchewan Art Board.
- 1983 – (January) Manitoba Museum of Man and Nature. A benefit auction.
- 1983 – Canada Canoe Festival – Victoria Island – Ottawa/Hull
- 1983 – Second Annual Atlantic Festival of Indian Arts and Crafts October 21–23 – Dalhousie Arts Centre. Halifax. Nova Scotia
- 1983 – Christmas Craft Show and Sale of Canadian Indian Arts and Crafts – November 4–6–Marlborough Inn. Calgary. Alberta
- 1983 – Eight Annual CKRC-CKWG Arts Manitoba. Juried Art Exhibition November 14–25 – Manitoba Archives Building 200 Vaughn Street. Winnipeg. Manitoba
- 1983 – C.A.R.F.A.C. (Manitoba) – Annual group/benefit – Winnipeg Art Gallery, Winnipeg, Manitoba – November
- 1984 – B.C. Indian Arts and Crafts (Trade) Show. Hyatt Regency Vancouver. B.C.
- 1984 – Third Annual Atlantic Festival of Indian Arts and Crafts. World Trade Centre. Halifax. Nova Scotia
- 1984 – Christmas Craft Show and Sale of Canadian Indian Arts and Crafts – Marlborough Inn. Calgary. Alberta
- 1984 – Fourth Annual Christmas Show and Sale of Canadian Indian Arts and Crafts. Edmonton Convention Centre. Edmonton. Alberta
- 1984 – Manitoba Winter Showcase of Canadian Indian Arts and Crafts. The Delta Winnipeg. Winnipeg. Manitoba
- 1985 – Winter Showcase of Canadian Indian Arts and Crafts. Ottawa. Ontario
- 1985 – Festival du Voyageur. St. Boniface. Manitoba
- 1985 – Canada Canoe Festival. Ottawa. Ontario
- 1985 – Eagle Mountain Indian Festival. Hunter Mountain – New York (U.S.A.)
- 1985 – Fourth Annual Atlantic Festival of Indian Arts and Crafts Hotel Nova Scotia
- 1985 – C.A.N.A.D.A. – The Show and Sale of Indian Arts and Crafts. Thompson. Manitoba
- 1985 – Fifth Annual Christmas Show and Sale of Canadian Indian Arts and Crafts. Edmonton Convention Centre. Edmonton. Alberta
- 1985 – Christmas Craft Show and Sale of Canadian Indian Arts and Crafts – Calgary Convention Centre. Winnipeg. Manitoba
- 1985 – Manitoba Christmas Craft Sale. Winnipeg Convention Centre. Winnipeg. Manitoba
- 1986 – Festival du Voyageur. St. Boniface. Manitoba
- 1986 – International Spring Fair. Birmingham. England
- 1986 – Manitoba Spring Crafts Sale. Winnipeg Convention Centre. Winnipeg. Manitoba
- 1986 – Indian Arts and Crafts Associations (IACA) Sixth Annual Spring Wholesale Market and Retailers. Denver Merchandise Mart. Denver. Colorado (U.S.A.)
- 1986 - Red Cloud Indian Art Show. Heritage Centre. Pine Ridge. South Dakota (U.S.A.)
- 1986 – Grand National American Indian Arts and Crafts Show and Sale, Las Vegas, Nevada (U.S.A.)
- 1986 – Summit on Indian Business – Convention Centre. Toronto. Ontario
- 1986 – Seattle Art Festival ’86. Seattle. Washington (U.S.A.)
- 1986 – The Canadian Annual Wildlife Art and Conservation Show and Sale. Durham. Ontario
- 1986 – 65th Annual Indian Ceremonial. Gallup. New Mexico (U.S.A.)
- 1986 – Sixth Annual Christmas Show and Sale of Canadian Indian Arts and Crafts. Edmonton Convention Centre. Edmonton. Alberta
- 1986 – Christmas Craft Show and Sale of Canadian Indian Arts and Crafts – Marlborough Inn. Calgary. Alberta
- 1986 – Manitoba Christmas Craft Sale. Winnipeg Convention Centre. Winnipeg. Manitoba
- 1987 – Mingmak (Muskox). Saskatoon. Saskatchewan
- 1987 – Santa Monica Indian Ceremonial. Los Angeles. California (U.S.A.)
- 1987 – Winnipeg Street Festival (Winnipeg Art Gallery). Winnipeg. Manitoba
- 1987 – Seventh Annual Christmas Show and Sale of Canadian Indian Arts and Crafts. Edmonton Convention Centre. Edmonton. Alberta
- 1987 – Peace Hill Trust Jury Native Art Show. Edmonton. Alberta
- 1988 – Winterlude. Ottawa. Ontario
- 1988 – Fedstival du Voyageur ’88. St. Boniface. Manitoba
- 1988 – Spring Craft Show. Ottawa. Ontario
- 1992 – Peace Hill Trust Jury Native Art Show. Edmonton. Alberta
- 1994 – Peace Hill Trust Jury Native Art Show. Edmonton. Alberta
- 1995 – Annual Native Art Auction. John Howard Society. Saskatoon. Saskatchewan
- Canada Council Art Bank
- Williams, David Burning Prairies 1981 Work on paper 82/3-0446
- Williams, David Buffalo - Summer Lodges/friends 1982 Work on paper 82/3-0448
- Williams, David Brown Pelican/Beaver-others- 1982 Work on paper 82/3-0447
- "In the Capital - History and Celebrations". canadascapital.gc.ca.
