= Harbour Expressway =

Limited-access highway in Thunder Bay, ON

- Map of Thunder Bay with Harbour Expressway shown in red

Route information
- Maintained by City of Thunder Bay - Department of Roads
- Length: 3.5 km (2.2 mi)
- Existed: 1979–present
- History: Inaugurated August 27, 1979; Originally part of Highway 131; Downloaded to city 1981

Major junctions
- West end: Highway 11 / Highway 17 / TCH (Shabaqua Highway)
- Golf Links Road Balmoral Street Memorial Avenue
- East end: Fort William Road (Continues as Main Street)

Location
- Country: Canada
- Province: Ontario
- Major cities: Thunder Bay

Highway system
- Ontario municipal expressways
(in alphabetical order)
← Gardiner Expressway	Harbour Expressway	Highbury Avenue →
Ontario provincial highways; Current; Former; 400-series
← Highway 130	→ Highway 132

The Harbour Expressway is a four-lane undivided municipal expressway with signalized intersections running through the Intercity business district of Thunder Bay, Ontario, Canada.

The highway bisects the Intercity area, which is primarily composed of big box retail stores and office parks, as well as suburban neighbourhoods. The expressway is one of the busiest and crucial piece of infrastructure for Thunder Bay, connecting key arteries and destinations with the provincial highway network, particularly Highway 11/17.

== Route description ==
The entire route of the Harbour Expressway is four lanes and undivided. All intersections are at-grade. Plans to divide the expressway and build interchanges are on hold, and the city of Thunder Bay maintains a right of way for these expansion plans in its official plan. In some places, there is evidence of those plans.

Starting at the west end, is the junction of Harbour Expressway, Highway 11/17, and Highway 61. There are plans to build a freeway to freeway interchange when the Thunder Bay Expressway twinning project occurs.

Heading east, the expressway separates Northwood and the Innova Park commercial district. A small road, Premier Way has a partial intersection with this expressway with two ramps. Traffic heading west on the expressway can exit onto Premier Way or traffic heading south on Premier Way can head west towards the highway junction.

After passing Northwood and Innova Park, the first major intersection is Golf Links Road. It is a signalised intersection with four right turn ramps. Passing the intersection, Confederation College is to the south of the expressway and the Thunder Bay Central suburbs are to the north of it. The expressway passes over the McIntyre River and a pedestrian trail connecting Confederation College with Riverside Drive.

The expressway then enters the Intercity Business District as it approaches Balmoral Street. The expressway traverses this business district as it passes Balmoral and Carrick Streets, both of which have the same configuration. This configuration is a signalised intersection with four right turn ramps.

The next intersection is Memorial Avenue, one of the busiest streets in Thunder Bay. This is another signalised intersection, but there are only two turning ramps. One moves southbound Memorial Avenue traffic onto westbound Harbour Expressway traffic while the other moves eastbound Harbour Expressway traffic onto southbound Memorial Avenue.

The expressway in the vicinity of Memorial Avenue is built over the former 16th Avenue. In the early 20th century, Port Arthur built a numbered street grid moving south from 1st Avenue onwards. While many are now buried under big box developments, evidence of some still exists. One is a stub of 16th Avenue immediately north of the Harbour Expressway between Memorial Avenue and the CN mainline. The Harbour Expressway crosses a diagonal single track CN line roughly halfway between Memorial Avenue and Fort William Road.

Finally, the expressway reaches its eastern terminus at Fort William Road. North of it is vacant commercial land and south of it is Intercity Shopping Centre, the latter having its own exit ramp shortly before Fort William Road. The roadway continues east as Main Street, a minor arterial road towards the Thunder Bay harbour.

== History ==
The first segment of roadway in the present Harbour Expressway can be traced back to the 1960s. In 1963, Transportation Minister Charles MacNaughton announced plans for the Lakehead Expressway to be built on the western edge of the twin cities of Port Arthur and Fort William, which amalgamated into Thunder Bay in 1970. During the second and third stages of development, the highway was built from the present intersections of Arthur Street/Highway 61 to Golf Links Road/Harbour Expressway. As the Thunder Bay Expressway continued to develop, it was realigned as segments from the McIntyre River to present day Harbour Expressway were built, removing Golf Links Road and what would become the Harbour Expressway from the Thunder Bay Expressway. This highway stub was not at that time the Harbour Expressway, as this expressway did not exist at that time. Furthermore, a road in the south portion of Port Arthur, named 16th Avenue existed in the vicinity of Memorial Avenue. This road would be built over, when the Harbour Expressway was built in the late 1970s.

Construction of the Harbour Expressway was part of the provincial government's 1977 construction program. The completed expressway was opened by Transportation Minister James Snow at a ribbon-cutting ceremony on August 27, 1979. It cost C$3.5 million to construct.

The Harbour Expressway was originally classified as a Provincial Highway. It had the designation of Highway 131. It was downloaded to the City of Thunder Bay, losing the King’s Highway designation in 1981. Subsequently, the number 131 was recycled and reused in Barrie, until that highway too faced a similar fate. At some point in time, Thunder Bay City Council looked at renaming the road since it does not fit the general definition of an expressway but has decided that it would be unnecessary.

In 2025, City Council ordered a designated truck route effective October. Harbour Expressway is a part of the network along with Island Drive, Highway 11/17, and Highway 61. Also, work has begun to allow synchronous green signals to provide a faster commute on the expressway.

== Major intersections ==
The following table lists the major junctions along Harbour Expressway. The entire route is located in Thunder Bay, Thunder Bay District. The intersections on the expressway are unnumbered.

km	mi	Destinations	Notes
0.0	0.0	Highway 11 / Highway 17 / Highway 61 / TCH (Thunder Bay Expressway)	Roadway west of intersection is part of “Shabaqua Highway” ( Highway 11 / Highway 17).
0.5	0.31	Premier Way	Limited access
1.0	0.62	Golf Links Road	
2.2	1.4	Balmoral Street	
2.8	1.7	Carrick Street	
3.1	1.9	Memorial Avenue	
3.2	2.0	16th Avenue	Small stub roadway to access commercial properties adjacent to the expressway.
3.3	2.1	CN Rail mainline crossing	Single train track
3.5	2.2	Fort William Road	Continues east as Main Street
1.000 mi = 1.609 km; 1.000 km = 0.621 mi
