= Garden River First Nation =

- Band No. 199
- Ketegaunseebee
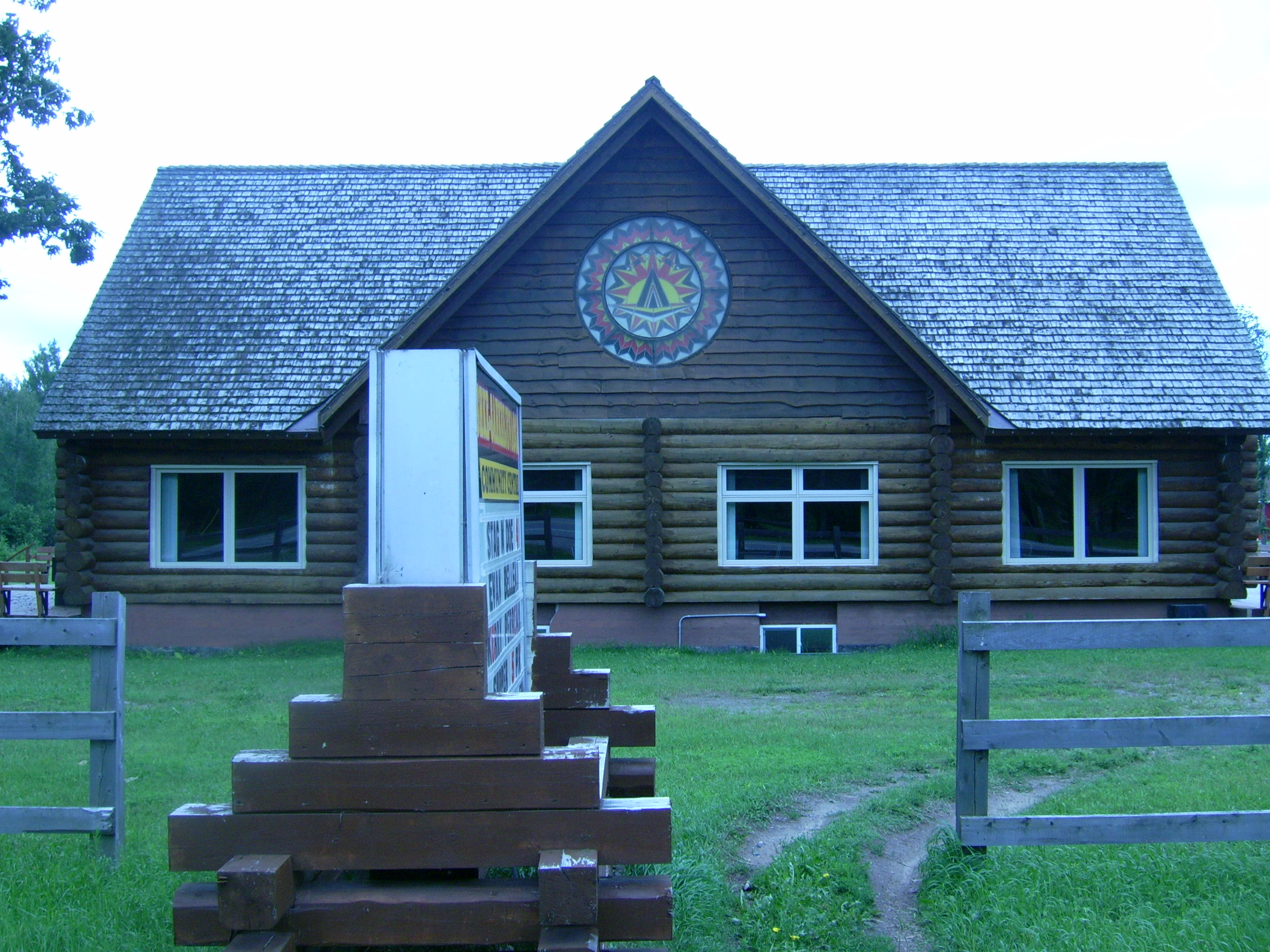
- Shke-Sahkehjewaosa Community Centre
- People: Ojibwe
- Treaty: Robinson Huron Treaty & Pennefather Treaty
- Headquarters: 7 Shingwauk Street, RR 4, Garden River
- Province: Ontario

Land
- Main reserve: Garden River 14
- Land area: 207.04 km^{2} (79.94 sq mi)

Population (2023)
- On reserve: 124
- On other land: 61
- Off reserve: 2073
- Total population: 3398

Government
- Chief: Karen Bell
- Council: Kari Lynne Barry; Darwin Belleau; Lee Ann Gamble; Kristy Dawn Jones; Travis Jones; Chester Langille; Luanne Povey; Candice Sim

Tribal Council
- Anishinabek Nation; Mamaweswen, The North Shore Tribal Council

Website
- https://www.gardenriver.org/site/

Garden River 14 Gitigaan-ziibi
- Indian reserve
- Garden River Indian Reserve No. 14
- Location within Ontario
- Coordinates: 46°33′N 84°06′W
- Country: Canada
- Province: Ontario
- District: Algoma
- First Nation: Garden River

Area
  - Land: 215.20 km^{2} (83.09 sq mi)

Population (2011)
  - Total: 1,107
  - Density: 5.1/km^{2} (13/sq mi)
- Time zone: UTC-5 (EST)
  - Summer (DST): UTC-4 (EDT)

Garden River First Nation, also known as Ketegaunseebee (Gitigaan-ziibi Anishinaabe in the Ojibwe language), is an Ojibwa band located at Garden River 14 near Sault Ste. Marie, Ontario, Canada.

The Garden River reserve consists of two non-contiguous areas, totalling 20,703.5 hectares (51,159 acres). The larger, main area is located along the St. Marys River and Highway 17. The Garden River runs through the reserve as a tributary of the St. Marys River. It is bordered by the Unorganized North Algoma District, Macdonald, Meredith and Aberdeen Additional, the city of Sault Ste. Marie, the Rankin Location Indian reserve, and Sugar Island Township, Michigan, USA.

Garden River First Nation is governed by a band council consisting of a chief and 8 councillors. Council elections are held biannually. The current chief is Karen Bell.

== History ==
Garden River First Nation was created as a legal entity when Lord Elgin, Governor General of the Province of Canada, approved in law the Robinson Huron Treaty on November 29, 1850. The treaty had been negotiated between the British colony's representative William B. Robinson and numerous Ojibwa chiefs from the Lake Huron watershed earlier that year, and had been signed by these representatives on Sept. 9, 1850. The treaty extinguished Ojibwa title to the land in exchange for 17 reserve lands and annual annuities. Each reserve had to register its band members because an increase to annuity amounts would be determined on a per-person basis.

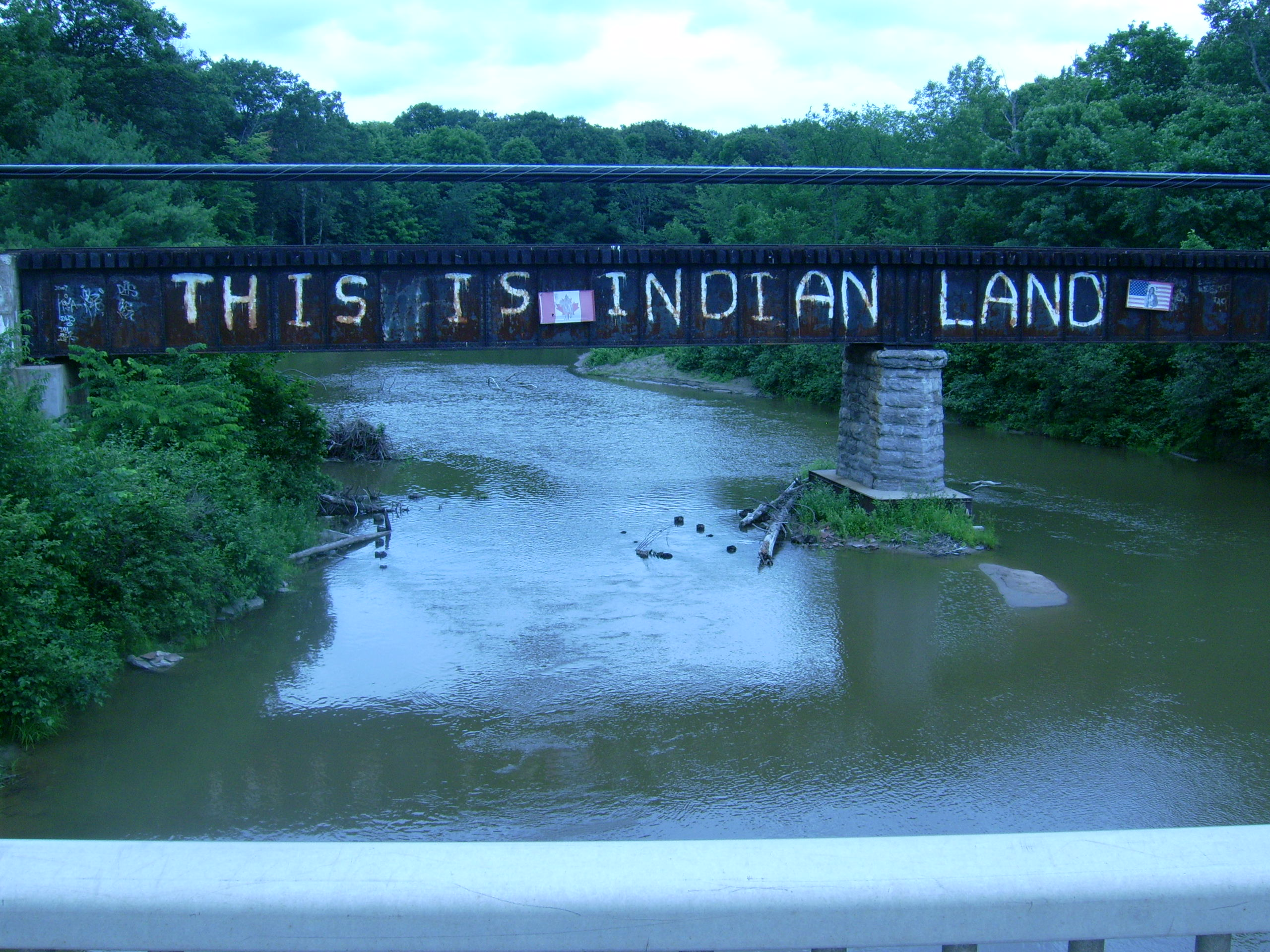
Rail bridge over the Garden River.

Garden River First Nation was represented in the treaty by Shingwaukonse, who was generally recognized as an Ojibwe grand chief by other bands in both the Lake Huron and Lake Superior watersheds. Shingwaukonse and his band had been living at their traditional garden lands at the mouth of the Garden River since 1841, after leaving a settlement near Sault Ste. Marie. The treaty formally recognized the band's reserve lands in this vicinity as reservation 14. Upon his death in 1854, Shingwaukonse was succeeded as chief by his son Augustine Shingwauk. The last hereditary chief was Shingwaukonse's second son Buhgwujjenene, who succeeded his brother Augustine.

In the treaty's schedule of reservations, the fourteenth reservation is "a tract of land extending from Maskinongé Bay, inclusive, to Partridge Point, above Garden River on the front, and inland ten miles, throughout the whole distance; and also Squirrel Island." For many years subsequent to signing the treaty, Garden River First Nation disputed the survey of their reserve conducted by the Province of Canada. In April 2003, the government of Canada returned 3,492 hectares of land to the reserve from the adjacent geographic townships of Anderson and Chesley. This resolution was negotiated between the band, the government of Canada, and the province of Ontario in accord with the Indian Lands Agreement of 1986. Ontario also released all mineral rights and revenues on the returned land to Canada to administer for the use of the band.

In a letter written in October 1855, Johann Georg Kohl cites visiting Rivière au Désert ("Garden River" (literally "Desert River") in French), located a few miles from the mouth of the St. Marys River. He recounted a Menaboju story of an encounter with the "Beaver King", in the recounting of "The Legend of Beaverhead Rock and the Origin of the St. Mary's River". Kohl also expressed praise of a beautiful birch bark biting art work he had seen while at Rivière au Désert

In 1964, the Garden River First Nation hosted a week-long assembly of the National Indian Council, in which Indigenous representatives from across Canada met in the community's meeting hall, Sahkahjewadsa meaning House of the Rising Sun.

=== Highway 17 dispute ===
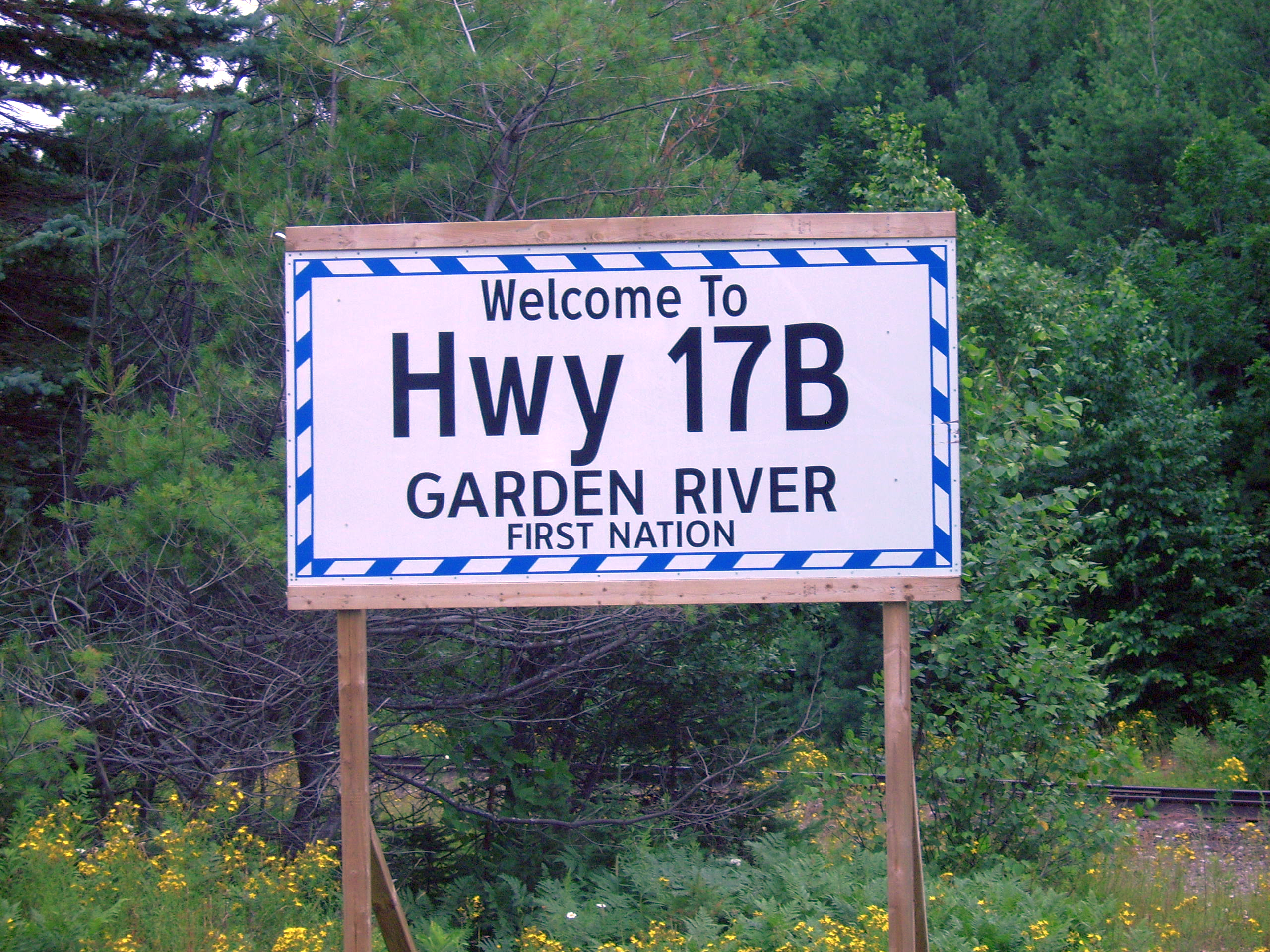
Unofficial Highway 17B signs, not approved by the MTO.

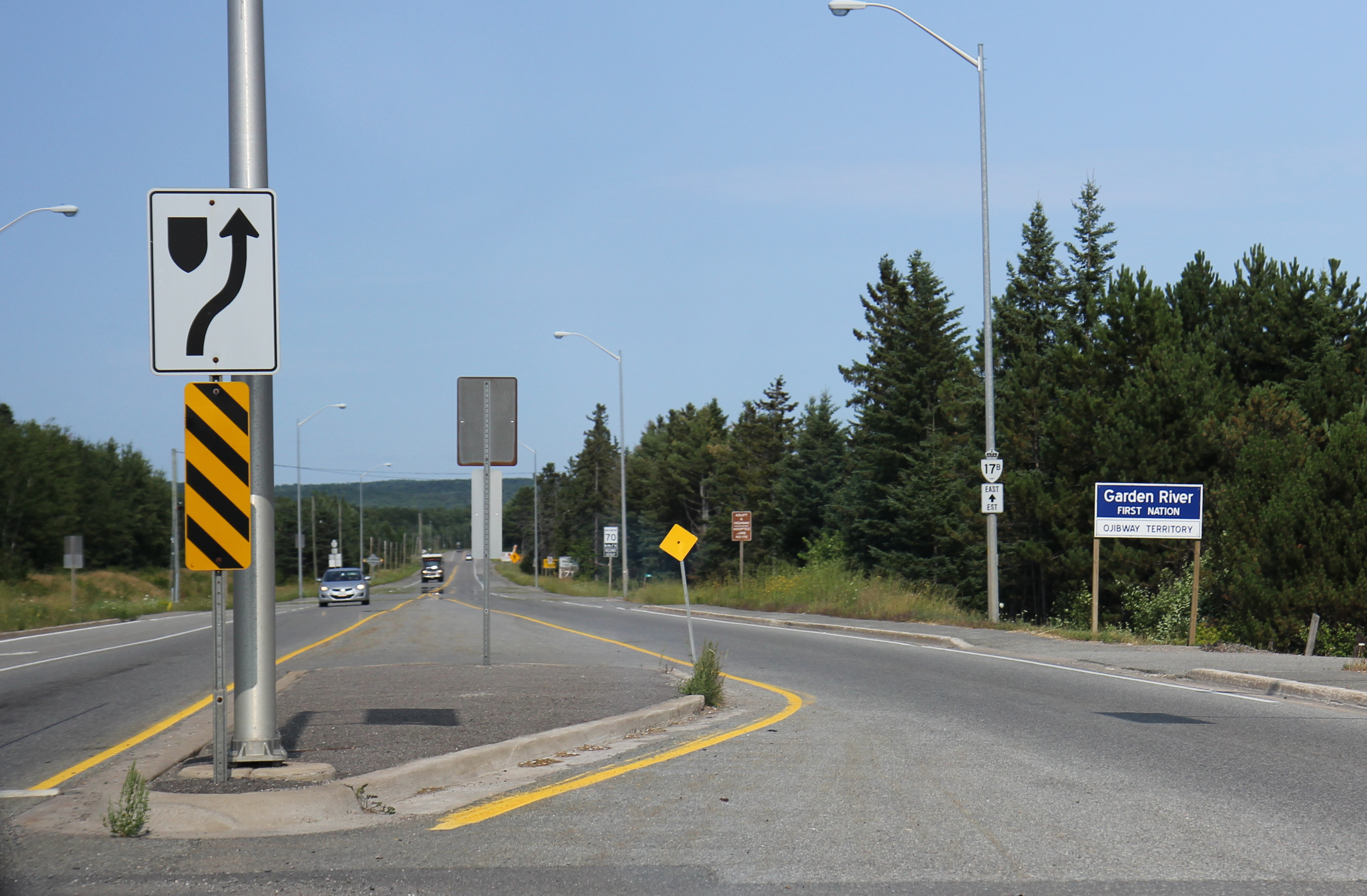
The sign installed after the dispute (2014)

Highway 17, the primary route of the Trans-Canada Highway, was realigned when a four-lane bypass opened north of the existing roadway on October 31, 2007. The reserve objected to the renaming of the old road as Highway 638, and erected its own signs identifying the road, unofficially, as Highway 17B. The municipal councils of Sault Ste. Marie and Macdonald, Meredith and Aberdeen Additional, which border Garden River on either side and are also located on the route of the disputed roadway, both passed municipal resolutions in 2007 supporting Garden River's position. The provincial government of Ontario eventually acceded to the Garden River band's demand, officially designating the route as Highway 17B in early 2009.

In February 2010, Garden River's band council publicly warned that they would consider imposing tolls on the routes of both Highway 17 and Highway 17B through their territory if the provincial government did not assist the council with a funding shortfall of approximately $1 million. They threatened to impose the toll to protest the HST and native people having to pay the tax, not because they wanted a million dollars.

== Population ==
Garden River First Nation has a population of 2,134 members registered under the Indian Act, according to the latest statistics (June, 2006). 1,004 members are resident on the band's reserve, while 1,130 members live off the reserve, predominantly but not exclusively in Sault Ste. Marie. According to Statistics Canada, the 2001 census showed the following: more than 45 per cent of the on-reserve population were under 25 years old; more than 93 per cent spoke only English at home; and more than 56 per cent identified as Catholic and 28 per cent as Protestant.

== Transportation ==
Ontario Northland provides intercity motor coach service to Garden River as a stop along its Sault Ste. Marie–Sudbury–North Bay–Ottawa route, with one bus a day each headed eastbound and westbound from Sunday to Friday, with no service on Saturdays.

== Notable Garden River First Nation members ==
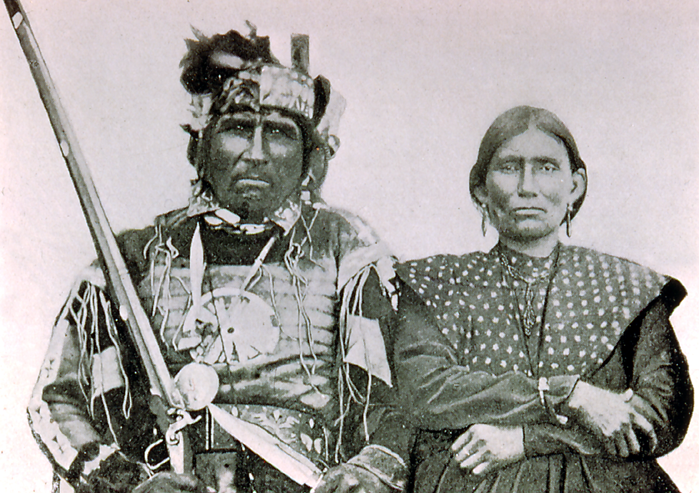
Chief Shingwauk and his wife Ogahbagehequa, c. 1840

- Jordan Nolan – Former NHL player, three-time Stanley Cup champion; two with the Los Angeles Kings and his third with the St. Louis Blues.
- Shingwaukonse - Hereditary Chief, Warrior, War of 1812 Capture of Fort Michilimackinac, Battle of Queenston Heights, education advocate, Christianity advocate as mentioned in writings of Rev., John Sunday and Rev., Peter Jones Kahkewaquonaby meaning Sacred Feathers in Ojibway Language also Chief of the Credit River Ojibway.
- Ted Nolan – Former NHL player and coach who won NHL Coach of the Year in 1996–97.
- Brandon Nolan – Former NHL player with the Carolina Hurricanes.
- David B. Williams - Painter and printmaker.
- Darren Zack – Inducted into the International Softball Congress Hall of Fame, four world championship titles with teams in Toronto, Tampa Bay (Florida) and Decatur, Ill. 1997 National Aboriginal Achievement Award in the sports Canadian Softball Hall of Fame in 2009. He also led Canada to three consecutive Pan American Games gold medals (1991, 1995 and 1999).
