= Garden River (Ontario) =

Watercourse in Ontario, Canada

Coordinates: 46°31′47″N 84°09′32″W

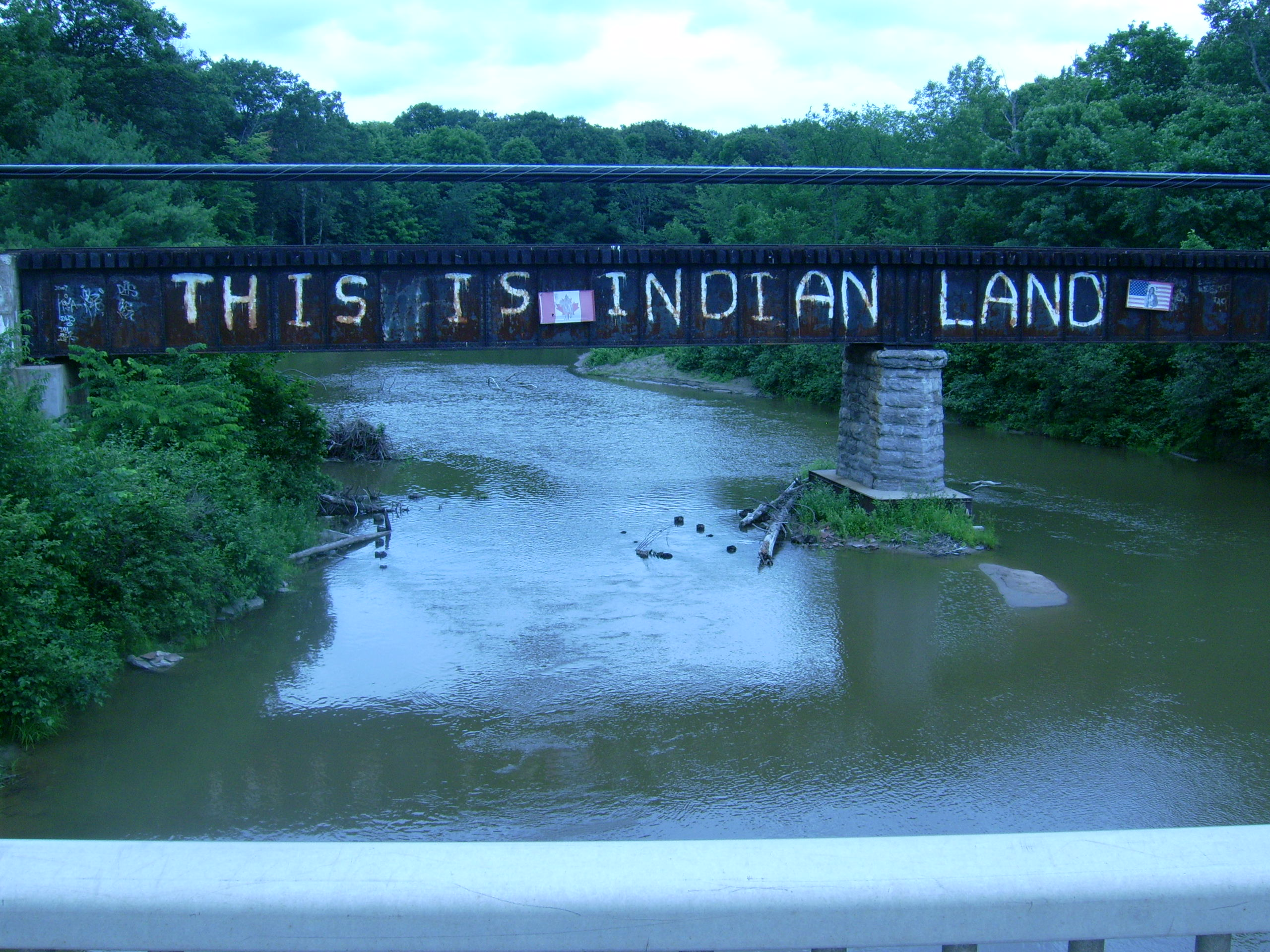
Rail bridge over the Garden River.

The Garden River is a river in the Algoma District of Ontario, Canada. The river's source is at Saymo Lake and Ranger Lake (Algoma District) from which it empties into the St. Marys River east of Sault Ste. Marie, Ontario.

The river gets its name from the vegetable gardens kept by the Ojibwa people in this area. The Garden River First Nation reserve is located in this area.

== See also ==
- List of Ontario rivers
