= Ontario Highway 17B =

Former Ontario provincial highways

Highway 17B

Route information
- Auxiliary route of Highway 17
- Maintained by Ministry of Transportation of Ontario

Location
- Country: Canada
- Province: Ontario
- Major cities: North Bay; Garden River

Highway system
- Ontario provincial highways; Current; Former; 400-series
← Highway 17A	→ Highway 19
Former provincial highways
Highway 18 →

Highway 17B was formerly the designation for six business routes of Highway 17, the main route of the Trans-Canada Highway through the Canadian province of Ontario. Each generally followed the original route of Highway 17 through the town or city that it served, and was subsequently given the Highway 17B designation when a newer bypass route was constructed to either reduce traffic pressure on the local street network, or provide a better thoroughfare that avoided urban areas altogether.

Four of the five original 17B routes have been decommissioned by the Ministry of Transportation (MTO), and are now maintained only by their local municipalities. However, in some cases the "Highway 17B" name may still be informally used by local residents to refer to the routes, and old highway shields may still be visible along the route in some locations. The lone remaining original 17B designation exists in North Bay. A new Highway 17B was designated in 2009, following a dispute between the MTO and the Garden River First Nation.

This article lists the various routes of Highway 17B by location, alphabetically. Current routes are listed first, followed by former routes.

== Garden River ==
Highway 17B
- Location: Garden River First Nations
- Length: 20.8 km (12.9 mi)
- Existed: 2007–present

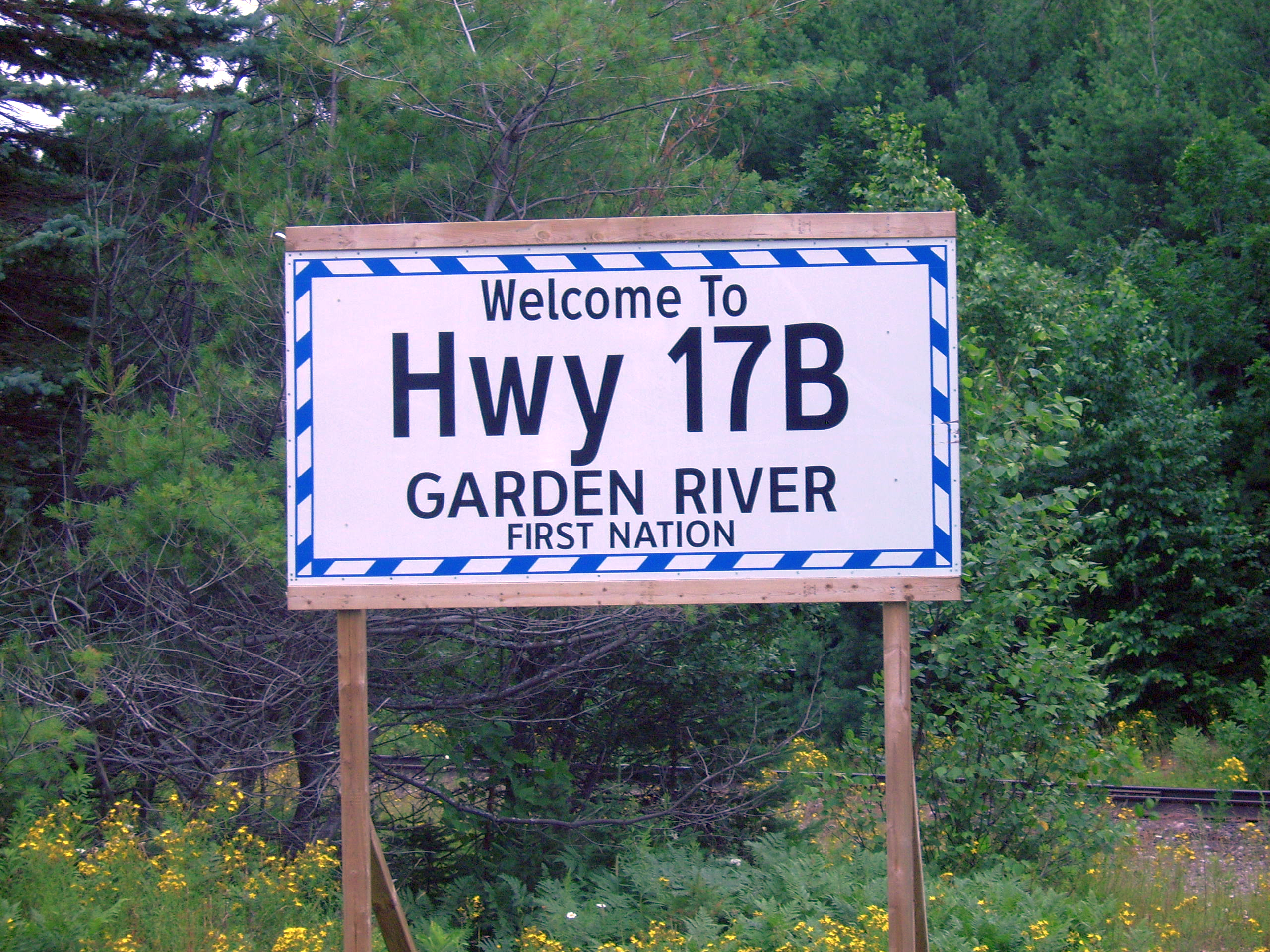
Unofficial Highway 17B sign placed by the Garden River First Nation

The Garden River portion of Highway 17B follows the original route of the Trans-Canada Highway within Algoma District into eastern Sault Ste. Marie. Negotiations for the construction of a four-lane bypass of Echo Bay began in the mid-1970s, though ultimately it would take until 1994 for the province to reach an agreement for land transfers with the Garden River First Nation. Following completion of the expressway bypass in 2005, the province of Ontario redesignated the former portion of Highway 17 as Highway 638. The Garden River First Nation insisted on the designation of Highway 17B instead, even going so far as to post their own non-official Highway 17B signs on the route.

As of February 2009, at the southern/eastern terminus with Highway 17, the highway has been officially rebadged as Highway 17B. The signage is in evidence until the intersection of Highway 638 at Echo Bay, after which the route no longer has any official identification. The southern terminus of 17B at Highway 17 features no 17B signage whatsoever. The intersection is identified from 17 simply as Bar River Road. However, the MTO Annual Average Daily Traffic Logs include the Garden River Highway 17B, as do some road maps.

In February 2010, Garden River's band council publicly warned that they would consider imposing tolls on the routes of both Highway 17 and Highway 17B through their territory if the provincial government did not assist the council with a funding shortfall of approximately C$1 million.

At some point since 2010, the MTO has since installed Highway 17B signs at the intersection of Syrette Lake Road, and at its western/northern terminus with Highway 17. Further signs were added at the Highway 638 / Church Street intersection in Echo Bay by 2012.

=== Major intersections ===
The following table lists the major junctions along the Sault St. Marie route of Highway 17B. The entire route is located within Algoma District.

Location	km	mi	Destinations	Notes
Macdonald, Meredith and Aberdeen Additional	0.0	0.0	Bar River Road	
Echo Bay	4.9	3.0	Highway 638 west (Church Street)	To Highway 17
Garden River First Nation	13.5	8.4	Ballpark Road	Garden River urban area
Garden River First Nation	20.8	12.9	Highway 17 – Sault Ste. Marie	Trans-Canada Highway
1.000 mi = 1.609 km; 1.000 km = 0.621 mi

== North Bay ==
Highway 17B
- Location: North Bay
- Length: 0.9 km (0.56 mi; 3,000 ft)

The Highway 17B route through North Bay originally travelled along Main Street from the western city limits to Algonquin Avenue, where it split into two one-way routes, McIntyre Street for westbound traffic and Oak Street for eastbound traffic. The Highway 17B designation travelled along McIntyre and Oak between Algonquin Avenue and Fisher Street, and Fisher Street constituted the remainder of the easterly route, rejoining Highway 17 near Northgate Square shopping mall.

McIntyre and Oak Streets, as well as the small portions of Fisher Street and Algonquin Avenue which connected the two one-way streets, were also designated as part of Highway 11B. However, after January 1, 1998, the eastern end of Highway 17B was rerouted along former Highway 63 (Cassells Street) to the intersection of Highway 11 and Highway 17 (North Bay Bypass) and Highway 63. The section within North Bay was maintained under a Connecting Link agreement until November 1998, after which it was repealed. This left only the short 900 m (0.56 mi) section outside the western city limits under provincial maintenance.

=== Major intersections ===
The following table lists the major junctions along the North Bay route of Highway 17B. The entire route is located within Nipissing District.

Location	km	mi	Destinations	Notes
Nipissing First Nation	0.0	0.0	Highway 17 / TCH – Sudbury	
Nipissing First Nation–North Bay boundary	0.9	0.56	Duchesnay Creek bridge	Beginning of former North Bay Connecting Link agreement
North Bay	4.4	2.7	Highway 63 north (Cassells Street); Highway 11B north (Algonquin Avenue); Highway 11B south (Main Street)	Route turns onto Cassells Street; former southern terminus of Highway 63; former southern end of Highway 63 concurrency
North Bay	6.3	3.9	Highway 11 / Highway 17 (North Bay Bypass) / TCH – Toronto, Ottawa Highway 63 north (Trout Lake Road) – Temiscaming	Former northern end of Highway 63 concurrency; end of former Connecting Link agreement
1.000 mi = 1.609 km; 1.000 km = 0.621 mi

== Ottawa ==
Highway 17B
- Location: Ottawa
- Length: 23.7 km (14.7 mi)
- Existed: 1966–1998

Highway 17B, in red, as it appears in the 1996 Ontario Road Map

Highway 17B through Ottawa somewhat followed the route of Highway 17 prior to the building of the Queensway, although it changed in subsequent years. Until the early 1960s, Highway 17 followed Carling Avenue, Bronson Avenue, Laurier Avenue, and eventually Rideau Street and Montreal Road, as it passed through Ottawa. Construction of the Queensway resulted in frequent changes to Highway 17. While the first section opened on November 25, 1960, the full route through Ottawa was not completed until the central section was opened on October 28, 1966. Following this, the Highway 17 designation was applied along the Queensway. Consequently, the Highway 17B designation was applied through Ottawa, following former portions of Highway 17. The 1967 Ontario Road Map shows Highway 17B beginning at the intersection of Carling Avenue and Pinecrest Road; it followed Richmond Road, Wellington Street, Rideau Street, and Montreal Road to end at the interchange with Ottawa Road 174 (then a portion of the Queensway). This route remained until 1970.

Highway 17B reappears in the 1977 edition of the Ontario Road Map, following Richmond Street from its interchange with the Queensway. From there it continued to Churchill Avenue, which it followed north to Scott Street. Scott Street travelled east to Wellington Street, which connected to Rideau Street and Montreal Road to end at the Queensway at Beacon Hill North. This route remained in place until 1982, after which Highway 17B followed Carling Avenue, thence easterly to Bronson Avenue. It then headed north along Bronson to the one-way pair of Chamberlain Avenue eastbound and Catherine Street westbound between Bronson and another pair of one-way streets: Kent Street northbound and O'Connor Street southbound. It travelled along those streets between Catherine/Chamberlain and Wellington Street, and thence easterly, passing Parliament Hill. The route then continued easterly along Rideau Street and Montreal Road to the Queensway.

Highway 17B continued to exist up until 1998, when it was decommissioned and transferred to the city of Nepean, city of Ottawa, city of Vanier and city of Gloucester. The route was likely maintained under a Connecting Link agreement with the City of Ottawa, as it is not listed in the April 1997 or January 1998 highway transfer lists, nor the 1989 or 1997 highway distance tables, yet appears up to the 1996 Ontario Road Map.

== Sault Ste. Marie ==
Highway 17B, in red, as it appears in the 1996 Ontario Road Map

Highway 17B
- Location: Sault Ste. Marie
- Existed: 1997

Highway 17B in Sault Ste. Marie consisted of two interconnected routes that connected Highway 17 with the International Bridge, via a one-way pairing through downtown Sault Ste. Marie. According to the 1989 Highway distance table, one branch of Highway 17B began at the intersection of Black Road and Trunk Road, following the latter southwest to Wellington Street, thence westerly to Pim Road / Great Northern Road, which it followed north to Highway 17 at Second Line. The second branch followed a complex of streets through the downtown core. Beginning at the foot of the International Bridge, the route split into a one-way pairing at Huron Street. Eastbound traffic was directed along Bay Street to Pim Street, north to Queen Street, east to Church Street thence north to the first branch at Wellington Street; westbound traffic followed Wellington Street, Cathcart Street and Huron Street to the bridge; Andrew Street provided a two-way connection between the one-way streets.

Although the route is no longer officially part of the provincial highway system, some signage remains identifying the route as 17B.

== Thessalon ==
Highway 17B
- Location: Thessalon
- Length: 3.1 km (1.9 mi)
- Existed: 1959–1989

Western entrance to Thessalon, circa 1920. This entranceway was located near the present intersection of Lakeside Drive and Dawson Street.

Similar view, 2016

The Highway 17B route through Thessalon travelled along Lakeside Drive, Frances Street, Huron Street and River Street, dipping south of the present Highway 17 route through the town. Highway 17B connected to Highway 129 at its eastern connection to Highway 17. The Thessalon Bypass was opened in 1958.

As it does not appear on any road maps, it was likely a Connecting Link.

== Thunder Bay ==
Highway 17B
- Location: Thunder Bay
- Length: 17.5 km (10.9 mi)
- Existed: 1968–1997

Highway 17B between Port Arthur and Fort William (which later amalgamated to become Thunder Bay) was created in 1968 when the Highway 11/17 concurrency was realigned to follow the Thunder Bay Expressway, and was cosigned with Highway 11B for its entire length.

Highway 11B/17B started at Arthur Street and the Thunder Bay Expressway. It travelled east along Arthur Street to May Street, which it turned north along. May Street became Memorial Avenue at the McIntyre River, and farther on became Algoma Street beyond John Street. At Bay Street, the route turned southeast towards Thunder Bay. At Cumberland Street, the highway turned northeast and continued along the lake side on that street. At the Current River, Cumberland Street became Hodder Avenue, which continued north to the Thunder Bay Expressway.

The Highway 11B/17B designation remained on the official Ontario road map until 1998. However, it is not listed amongst the decommissioned highways of April 1, 1997, nor January 1, 1998. It is unclear when the route was decommissioned.
