= Ontario Highway 130 =

Ontario provincial highway

Highway 130
- Map of Highway 130 shown in red and pink. Former parts are navy blue.

Route information
- Maintained by the Ministry of Transportation of Ontario
- Length: 15.4 km (9.6 mi)
- Existed: December 7, 1955–present

Major junctions
- South end: Highway 61 near McCluskeys Corners
- North end: Highway 11 / Highway 17 near Thunder Bay

Location
- Country: Canada
- Province: Ontario

Highway system
- Ontario provincial highways; Current; Former; 400-series
| ← Highway 129 | → Highway 132 |
Former provincial highways
| Highway 131 → |

King's Highway 130, commonly known as Highway 130, is a provincially maintained highway in the Canadian province of Ontario. It begins at a junction with Highway 61 and travels 15.4 km (9.6 mi) north-west to the Trans-Canada Highway, Highway 11 and Highway 17, west of Thunder Bay. Highway 130 is a short connecting highway, and passes entirely through the outskirts of Thunder Bay, connecting several minor communities and providing a shortcut for traffic travelling from the south to the west or vice versa. The speed limit along the highway is 80 km/h (50 mph); it is patrolled by the Ontario Provincial Police.

Highway 130 has retained most of its current route since the mid-1970s, but was longer prior to then, when it extended north of Arthur Street to Oliver Road and then along that road into downtown Thunder Bay, ending at what is now Water Street. The route was originally designated in late 1955.

== Route description ==
Highway 130 is situated in the municipality of Oliver Paipoonge, in Thunder Bay District. The short route serves to connect Highway 61 with Highways 11 and 17 west of Thunder Bay, a distance of 15.4 kilometres (9.6 mi).

Beginning at Highway 61 in the south, the route proceeds straight north along a concession road midway between Monteith Road to the west and Hanna Road to the east. Surrounded almost entirely by farmland, the highway encounters McCluskey Drive one kilometre (0.62 mi) along its route and Candy Mountain Drive two kilometres north of that. At the latter is the small community of Slate River Valley, though relatively few residences are located on the highway. At Barrie Drive, two kilometres north of the community, the highway turns east; a channelized right turn lane is provided for northbound traffic while southbound traffic is given the right of way at the intersection. The highway travels east to Hanna Road where it turns north; this junction features a channelized lane for southbound traffic while giving northbound traffic the right of way at the intersection.

Now surrounded by residences to the west and a farm to the west, the highway travels north a short distance before curving to the southeast to cross the Kaministiquia River. Gradually curving back to the north, the route features residences to the south and woodland to the north. It enters the community of Twin City, acting as the main street and intersecting Rosslyn Road immediately north of a Canadian National Railway crossing and the Paipoonge Museum. At Arthur Street, the highway turns west until it ends at Highway 11 and Highway 17.

== History ==
Highway 130 was first designated in late 1955 and early 1956. At that time the route ended in the midst of McIntyre Township; it began at Algoma Street, then the route of Highway 17, and followed John Street and Oliver Road. The Department of Highways assumed the portion within McIntyre Township on December 7, 1955. Three months later, the route was extended south to Highway 61 when the department assumed the section in Paipoonge Township on March 7, 1956.

This route remained in place until the mid-1970s, when Highway 130 was decommissioned north of Arthur Street; the section within the newly formed City of Thunder Bay was transferred to the city on October 1, 1970, while the section within McIntyre Township remained until at least 1973. On August 17, 2007, the highway was extended by 2 km (1.2 mi) when Highway 11 and Highway 17, which until then travelled along Arthur Street, were transferred onto the Shabaqua Bypass to the north. As a result, Highway 130 was extended west along Arthur Street to its current terminus at the bypass.

== Major intersections ==
The following table lists the major junctions along Highway 130, as noted by the Ministry of Transportation of Ontario. The entire route is located in Oliver Paipoonge, Thunder Bay District.

| km | mi | Destinations | Notes |
|---|---|---|---|
| 0.0 | 0.0 | Highway 61 – Thunder Bay, Duluth | |
| 11.4 | 7.1 | Rosslyn Road | |
| 14.6 | 9.1 | Arthur Street – Thunder Bay | Northern terminus until August 17, 2007; formerly Highway 11 / Highway 17 |
| 15.4 | 9.6 | Highway 11 / Highway 17 / TCH – Thunder Bay, Kenora, Fort Frances | |
1.000 mi = 1.609 km; 1.000 km = 0.621 mi
