= Caribou (disambiguation) =

Caribou is one common name for the deer species Rangifer tarandus, also known as reindeer.

Caribou may also refer to:

== Places ==
- Caribou Island (disambiguation)
- Caribou Lake (disambiguation)
- Caribou Mountain (disambiguation)
- Caribou Mountains (disambiguation)
- Caribou River (disambiguation)

=== Canada ===
- Caribou, Nova Scotia, a rural community
- Caribou Lake (Temagami), Ontario
- Caribou Lake (North Bay, Ontario)
- Caribou Mountains (Alberta)
- Caribou Mountain (Temagami), Ontario
- Caribou River (Rainy River District), Ontario
- Caribou River (Thunder Bay District), Ontario

=== United States ===
- Caribou, California, a census-designated place
- Caribou, Colorado, a ghost town
- Caribou, Maine, a city
- Caribou Township, Kittson County, Minnesota
  - Caribou, Minnesota, an unincorporated community
- Caribou County, Idaho
- Caribou Range
  - Caribou Mountain (Idaho)
- Caribou Mountain (Franklin County, Maine), on the Canada-United States border
- Caribou River (Minnesota)
- Caribou Wilderness, a federally-designated wilderness area in northern California

== Transportation ==
- Caribou (train), formerly operated on the island of Newfoundland
- De Havilland Canada DHC-4 Caribou, a Canadian transport aircraft
- MV Caribou, a Canadian passenger-vehicle ferry named after SS Caribou
- SS Caribou, a Newfoundland passenger ferry torpedoed during World War II

== Military ==
- Caribou, the export version of the Bell P-39 Airacobra fighter aircraft
- HMCS Caribou (S12), a Royal Canadian Navy armed yacht that served in the Second World War
- CFAV Caribou (YAG 314), a 1950s Royal Canadian Navy vessel
- CFAV Caribou (PCT 57), a Royal Canadian Navy training and surveillance vessel launched in 2007
- Caribou Air Force Station, a defunct Air Force Station in Limestone, Maine, United States
- Battle of Caribou, an 1838 minor skirmish in the Aroostook War fought at Caribou, Maine

== Music ==
- Caribou, a stage name used by Canadian musician Dan Snaith
- Caribou Records, a defunct record label
- Caribou (album), a 1974 album by Elton John
- "Caribou", a song by Pixies from their first album Come On Pilgrim

== Other uses ==
- Caribou, an early codename for what became Google's Gmail
- Caribou (drink), an alcoholic mixed drink popular in Quebec
- Caribou Biosciences, a biotech company
- Caribou Coffee, a chain of coffee shops
- Caribou Inuit, an Inuit group in Nunavut, Canada
- Caribou High School, Caribou, Maine, United States
- Caribou Manufacturing Company, original name of the Monaco Coach Corporation, an American recreational vehicle manufacturer
- Caribou Wind Park, New Brunswick, Canada, a wind farm
- Colorado Caribous, a 1978 soccer team from Denver, Colorado, United States
- Quebec Caribou, a former rugby union club based in Montreal, Quebec, Canada

== See also ==
- Cariboo (disambiguation)
- Carabao, a type of Southeast Asian water buffalo
- Reindeer (disambiguation)
