= Lake Superior National Marine Conservation Area =

National marine conservation area in Ontario, Canada

- IUCN category VI (protected area with sustainable use of natural resources)
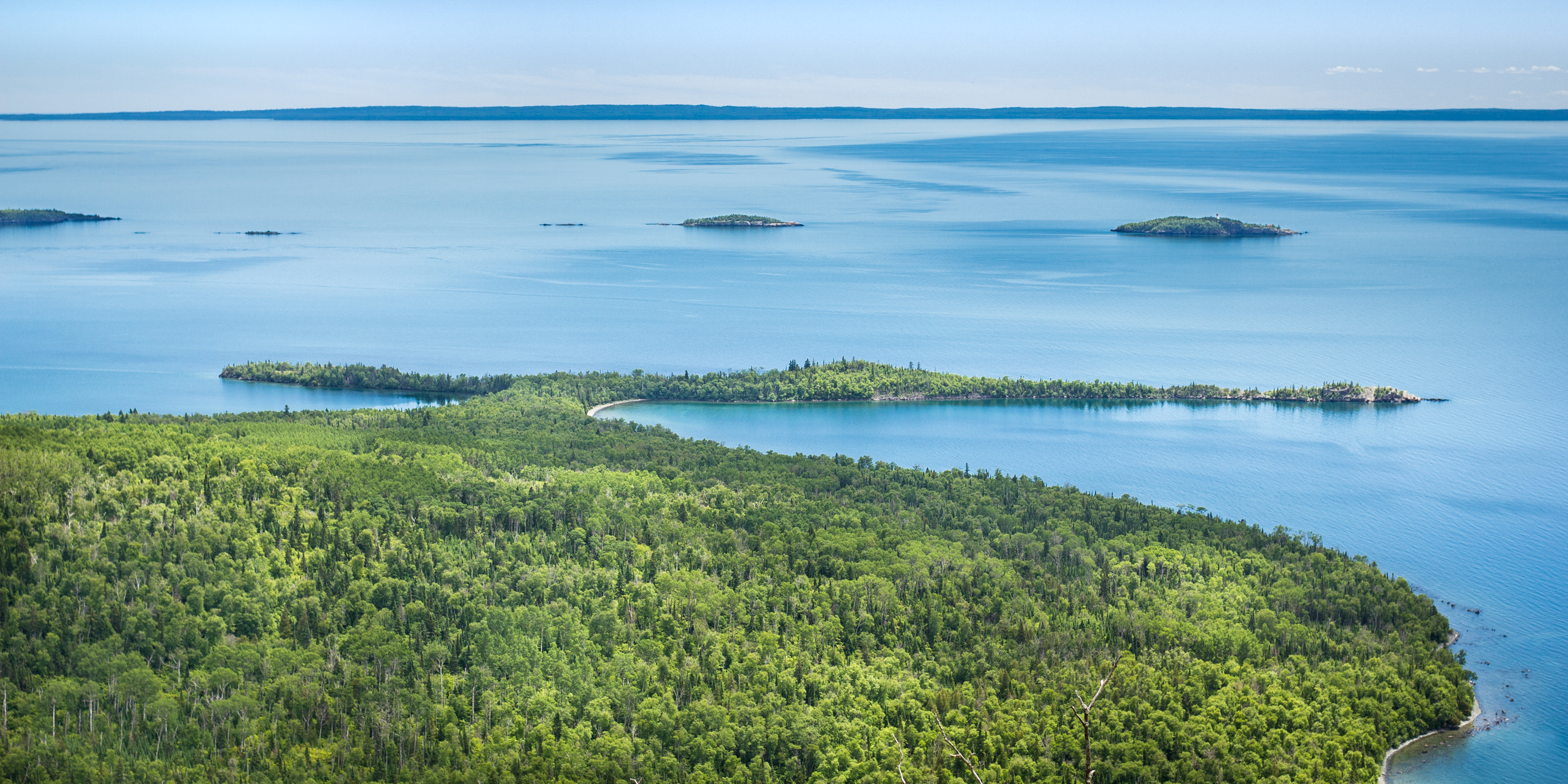
- Looking southeast over Lake Superior from Sleeping Giant Provincial Park

- Location within Canada Location within Ontario
- Location: Northwestern Ontario, Canada
- Nearest city: Nipigon, Ontario, Canada
- Coordinates: 48°26′6″N 89°13′14″W
- Area: 10,000 km^{2} (3,900 sq mi)
- Established: September 1, 2015
- Governing body: Parks Canada

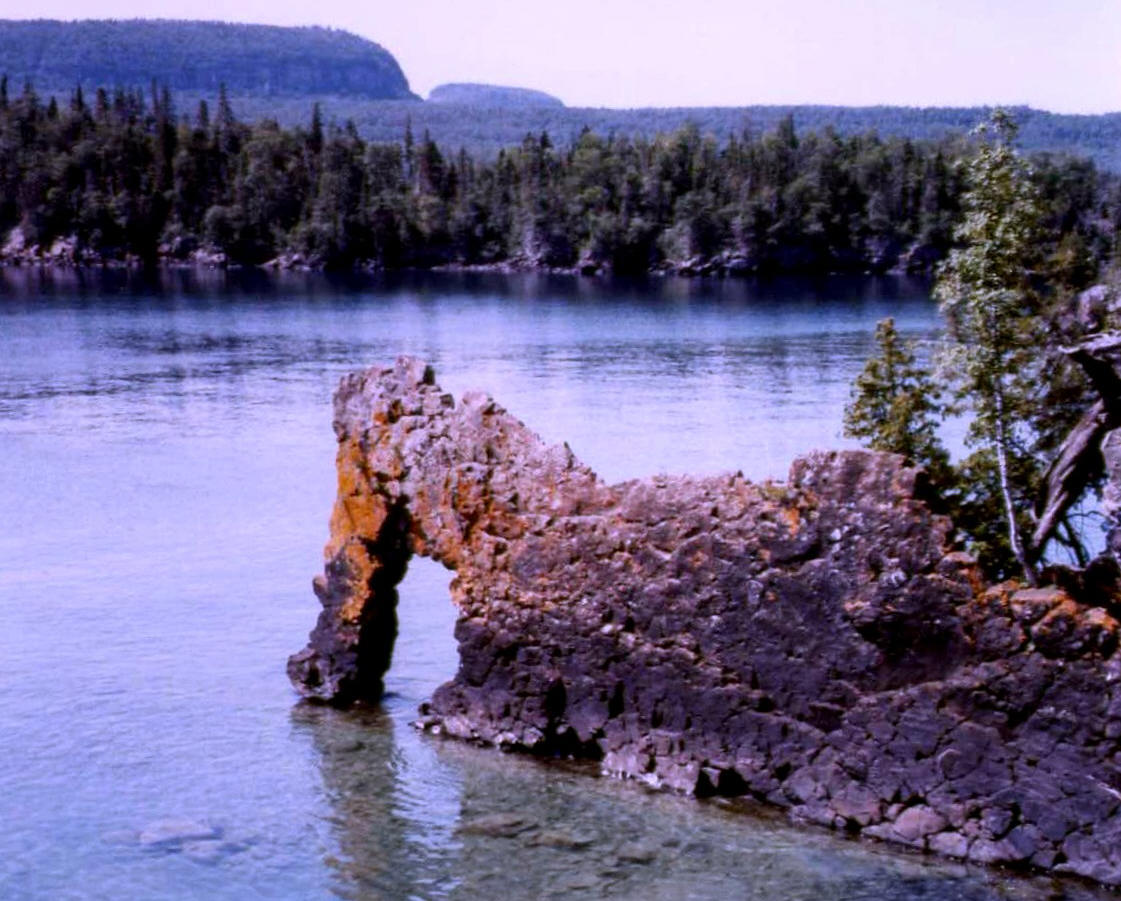
Sea Lion Arch and Sleeping Giant, Lake Superior shoreline, Ontario

Lake Superior National Marine Conservation Area (French: Aire marine nationale de conservation du Lac-Supérieur) is a National Marine Conservation Area (NMCA) on the north shore of Lake Superior in Ontario, and is a unit of the national park system. Established on September 1, 2015, it is the largest freshwater marine protected area in the world.

Although national marine parks and a reserve had been created previously, and managed as NMCAs, this was the first area in Canada to be designated a "National Marine Conservation Area" as defined by the Marine Conservation Areas Act. Plans to create it were first announced by Canadian Prime Minister Stephen Harper on October 25, 2007, in Nipigon, Ontario. The area is a unit of Canada's national park system administered by Parks Canada.

The conservation area extends 140 kilometres (87 mi) eastward from Thunder Bay, from Thunder Cape in the west, at the tip of Sleeping Giant Provincial Park, to Bottle Point in the east, and stretches southward to the Canada-US border, linking with Isle Royale National Park. The Nipigon River and Lake Nipigon lie to the north.

== Designation process ==
Proposals to protect the area were first suggested in the mid-1990s, and formal plans were first announced in 2002.

The marine conservation area was proposed after discussion with provincial and First Nations representatives. The First Nations in the area, represented by Wilfred King, the regional grand chief of the northern Superior region, endorsed the proposal once they were satisfied that it respected the Robinson Superior Treaty of 1850.

Parks Canada distributed questionnaires to local residents as a public consultation. 67% of respondents supported the "largest possible designation area", with 13% opposing any NMCA designation, and the remaining supporting some form of NMCA.

In June 2015, the federal government introduced a bill to create the NMCA, which received royal assent on June 24. The law specified that the NMCA would come into force on either the day of approval or on September 1, 2015—whichever came latest. With approval given in June, the park was legally created on September 1.

== Ecology ==
Lake Superior National Marine Conservation Area covers roughly 10,000 km^{2} (3,861 sq mi) of lakebed, its overlaying freshwater, and associated shoreline on 60 km^{2} (23 sq mi) of islands and mainland. The area is home to numerous species including herons, peregrine falcons, and bald eagles. The spawning and schooling waters of deep coldwater fish, such as whitefish, lake herring, walleye, and lake trout will be protected by this zone. Caribou foraging and calving areas are located on shore. Lake Superior is home to about 70 fish species.

The official designation prevents resource extraction or other operations which may damage the aquatic or terrestrial ecosystems in the conservation area. However, per the agreement with the First Nations, it does not exclude all commercial marine activity, such as shipping, and commercial and sport fishing.

National marine conservation areas balance environmental protection with responsible economic activity. They protect key elements of the ecosystem, while preserving the livelihoods of local residents who work in marine industries.

— Stephen Harper, announcing the proposed Lake Superior National Marine Conservation Area

== Acquisition of Wilson Islands ==
In 2009, the Wilson Islands were purchased from private owners. These eight almost untouched islands lie off Rossport in Ontario waters. The acquisition was made by the governments of Canada and Ontario, and the Nature Conservancy of both Canada and the United States, with donated funds, much of which were contributed by U.S. donors. The acquisition had substantial support from the Pays Plat First Nation, which will cooperate in stewardship of the islands.

The islands include cliffs, both rocky and sandy shorelines, coastal wetlands, and deep forests. Flora include the rare mountain fir moss and northern woodsia fern; fauna include peregrine falcons, bald eagles, and shorebirds. Their habitat will now be protected from mining and other development. By this acquisition, the marine conservation area, already the largest freshwater protected area in the world, acquires and preserves over 4,700 acres (1,900 hectares) of land in the heart of the preserve.

== Relics of human history ==
Historic shipwrecks lie on the seabed of the Lake Superior National Marine Conservation Area, including the Gunilda at Rossport. The shores have two areas of First Nation pictographs and Sibley Peninsula has archaeological sites from Paleoindian, archaic, and woodland settlements.

== See also ==
- National Marine Conservation Areas
- National Parks of Canada
- List of National Parks of Canada
- Parks Canada
