= Thunder Bay (Ontario) =

Bay of Lake Superior

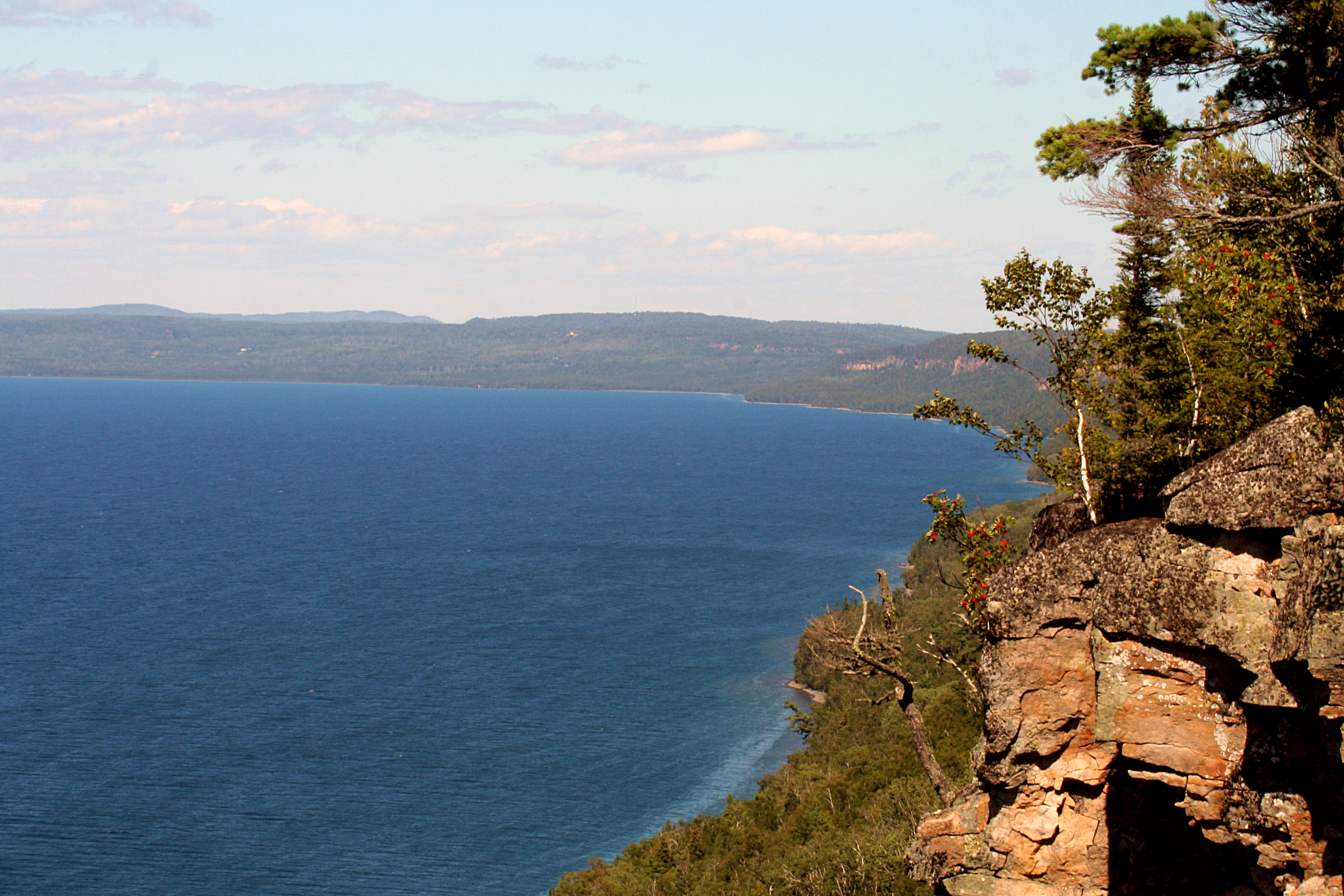
- Thunder Bay as seen from Sleeping Giant

- Location within Ontario
- Location: Thunder Bay District, Ontario, Canada
- Coordinates: 48°22′00″N 89°02′00″W
- Type: Bay
- Part of: Lake Superior
- Primary inflows: Kaministiquia River, Current River
- Max. length: 55 km (34 mi)
- Max. width: 24 km (15 mi)
- Surface elevation: 183 m (600 ft)
- Islands: Caribou, Pie, Welcome Islands
- Settlements: Thunder Bay

Thunder Bay is a large bay on the northern shore of Lake Superior, in Thunder Bay District, Ontario, Canada. The bay is bordered to the east by the Sibley Peninsula at the southern tip of which is Thunder Cape, marking the entrance to the bay for ships approaching from the east. The mesas and sills on the peninsula are known as the Sleeping Giant due to their appearance when viewed from Thunder Bay.

The harbour at the City of Thunder Bay is Canada's westernmost port on the Great Lakes.

The Ojibwa called it Animikie, meaning "thunder". French explorers called it Baie du Tonnerre which was translated to Thunder Bay in English. In 1871, the bay gave its name to the newly created Thunder Bay District, and in 1970, the amalgamated city of Port Arthur and Fort William also adopted the name Thunder Bay.

The waters along the bay's shores form part of the Lake Superior Water Trail. This 1,000 kilometres (620 mi) long water trail is a link in the Trans Canada Trail network and provides paddlers access to the bay and facilities for travel along the coast from Gros Cap to the City of Thunder Bay.

== Geography ==
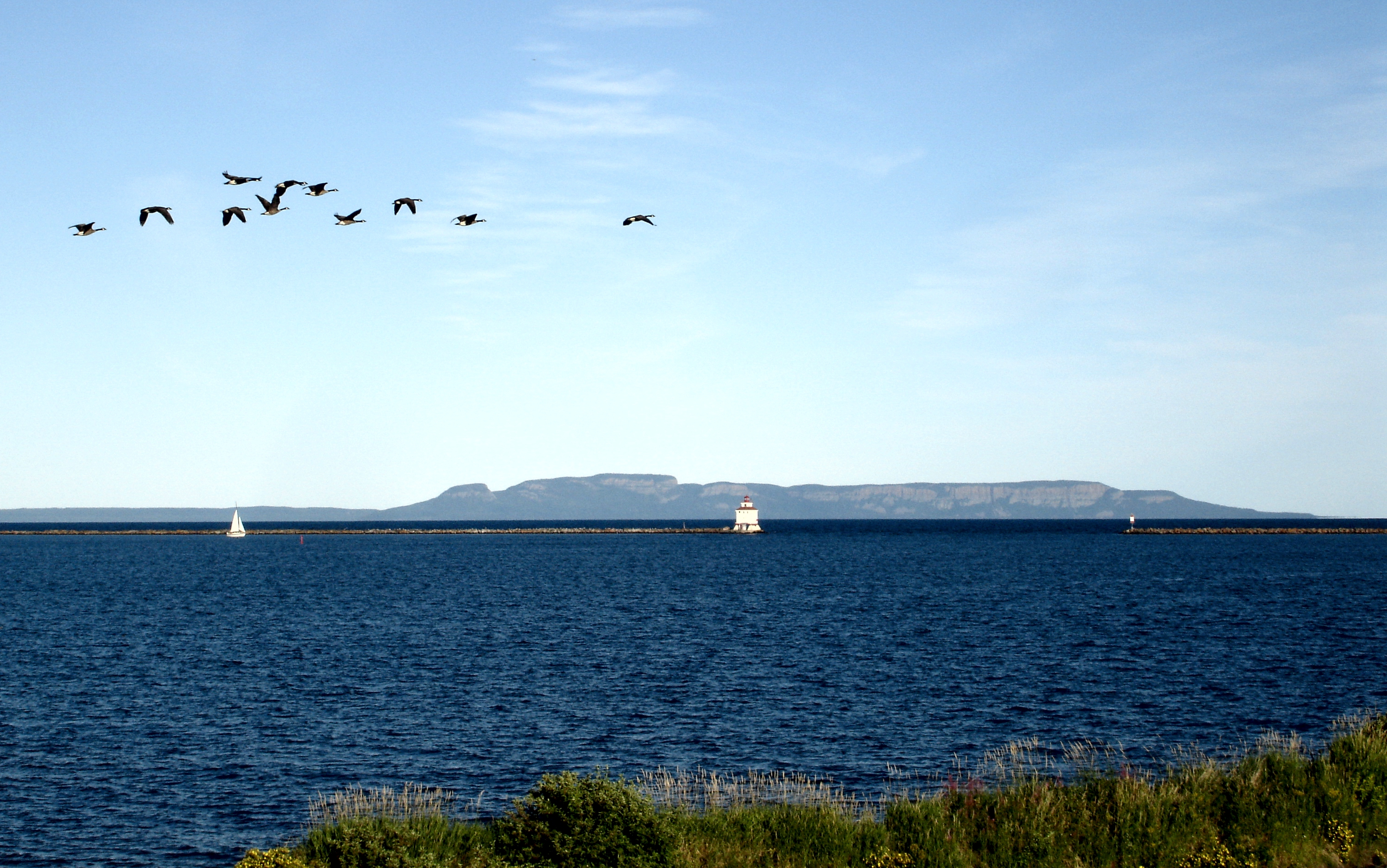
Sleeping Giant as seen across Thunder Bay

Thunder Bay is an extensive diamond-shaped body of water surrounded by cliffs rising from 300 metres (1,000 ft) to 460 metres (1,500 ft) out of the lake. It is about 55 kilometres (34 mi) long in a northeast-southwest direction, and about 24 kilometres (15 mi) wide from northwest to southeast. Its eastern entrance is Thunder Cape, a prominent headland at the southern tip of Sibley Peninsula. Pie Island divides the mouth of the bay into 2 channels.

Notable islands and island chains in the bay include:

- Pie Island and nearby Flatland Island
- Welcome Islands
- Caribou Island

Rivers emptying into the bay include the:

- Kaministiquia River
- Neebing River
- McIntyre River
- Current River
- MacKenzie River (18 km east of the city)
- Blende River
- Wild Goose Creek
- Blind Creek
