= Caribou River =

Caribou River may refer to several places:

- Caribou River, Nova Scotia, a community in Canada
- Caribou River (Rainy River District), a river in Ontario, Canada
- Caribou River (Thunder Bay District), a river in Ontario, Canada
- Caribou River (Minnesota), a river in U.S.

== See also ==
- Cariboo River (British Columbia), Canada; a river
- Cariboo River Provincial Park, British Columbia, Canada
- Caribou (disambiguation)
