= Caribou Lake =

Caribou Lake may refer to the following lakes:

- Caribou Lake (Ontario), Canada; any of several lakes, see List of lakes of Ontario: C
  - Caribou Lake (Temagami), Ontario, Canada
  - Caribou Lake (North Bay, Ontario), Canada
- Caribou Lake (Chaudières-Appalaches), Quebec, Canada
- Caribou Lake (Maine), USA; any of several lakes, see List of lakes of Maine
- Caribou Lake (California), USA; the lake in Caribou Wilderness from which the area gets its name

== See also ==
- Cariboo Lake, Ontario, Canada; see List of lakes of Ontario: C
- Big Caribou Lake, Ontario, Canada; see List of lakes of Ontario: B
- East Caribou Lake, Ontario, Canada; see List of lakes of Ontario: E
- North Caribou Lake, Kenora, Ontario, Canada; a lake
- Caribou (disambiguation)
