= Caribou Island =

Caribou Island may refer to:

== Places ==
- Caribou Island, Alaska, USA; an island; see List of islands of Alaska

=== Ontario, Canada ===
There are six different islands in the province of Ontario called "Caribou Island" including:

- Caribou Island (near Michipicoten Island), a large uninhabited island in eastern Lake Superior approximately 75 kilometres (47 mi) off the shore of Lake Superior Provincial Park] and approximately 140 kilometres (87 mi) northwest of Sault Ste. Marie, Ontario.
- Caribou Island (Thunder Bay), a large uninhabited island in western Lake Superior, approximately 32 kilometres (20 mi) east of the city of Thunder Bay.
- Caribou Island is the name of an island located on Big Caribou Lake in Parry Sound District.
- Caribou Island is the name of an island located at 46°55′52″N 80°41′12″W on Chiniguchi Lake, approximately 50 kilometres (31 mi) northeast of Sudbury.

=== Nova Scotia, Canada ===
- Caribou Island is an island in Pictou County connected to the mainland by a causeway, near the rural community of Caribou, Nova Scotia.
- Caribou Island is an island in Halifax Regional Municipality, located near the rural community of Little Harbour, Halifax, Nova Scotia.

== Other uses ==
- Caribou Island Lighthouse, Caribou Island, Lake Superior, Ontario, Canada

== See also ==
- Dolphin-Union caribou, also known as Island caribou, a migratory population of caribou on Victoria Island
- East Caribou Island, Isle Royale National Park, Lake Superior, Ontario, Canada; an island, see List of islands in Isle Royale National Park
- West Caribou Island, Isle Royale National Park, Lake Superior, Ontario, Canada; an island, see List of islands in Isle Royale National Park
- Caribo Island, Vatnahverfi, Greenland; an island
- Caribou (disambiguation)
