= SS Glenlyon =

Freighter sunk off the shore of Isle Royale in Lake Superior

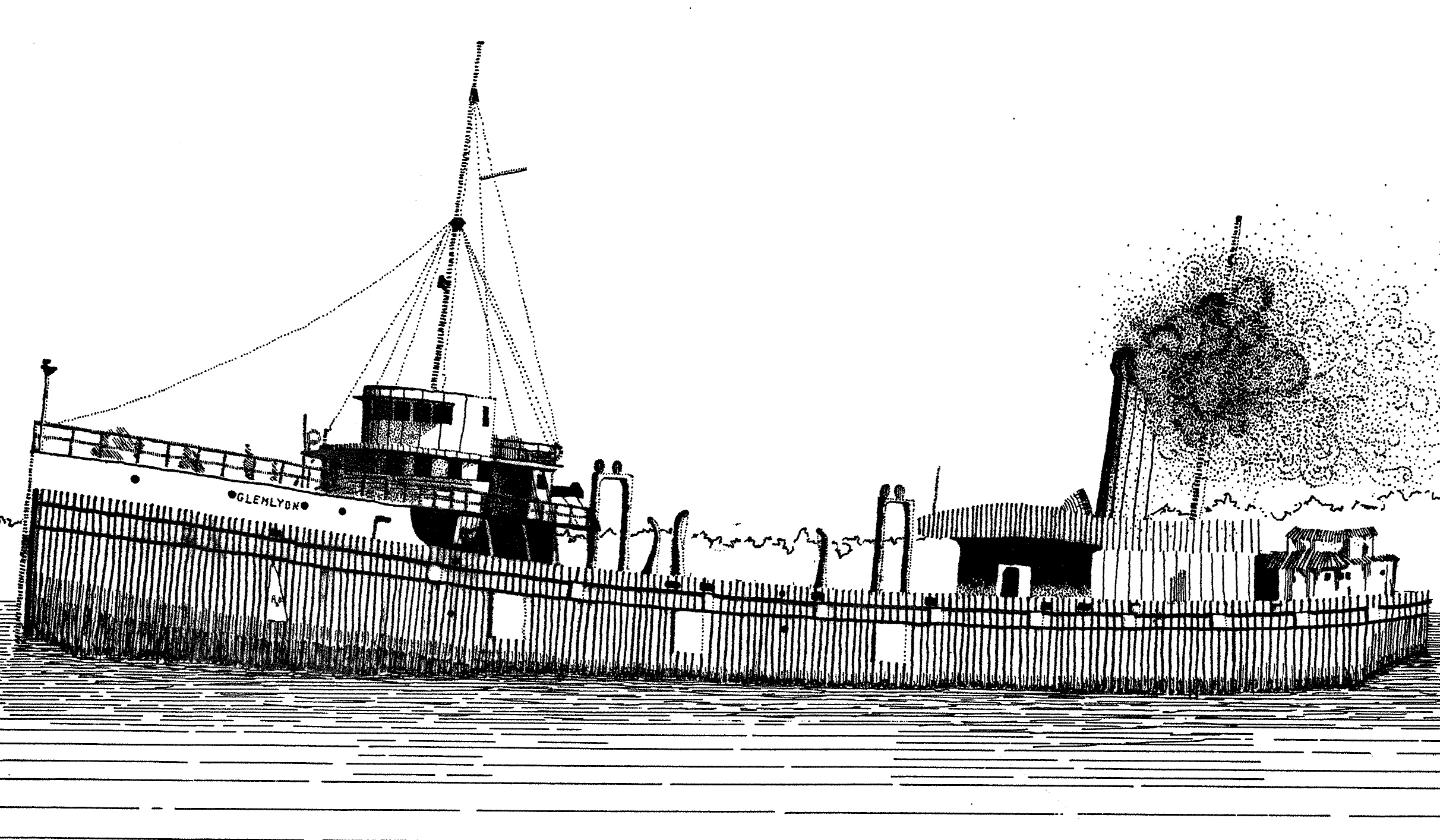

History

Canada
- Name: Glenlyon
- Operator: Midland Shipbuilding Company
- Builder: F. W. Wheeler
- Launched: February 4, 1893
- Acquired: 1914
- Out of service: November 1, 1924
- Fate: Sunk off the shore of Isle Royale in Lake Superior

General characteristics
- Type: Freighter
- Tonnage: 3,800 DWT
- Length: 328 ft (100 m)
- Beam: 42.5 ft (13.0 m)
- Depth: 20.5 ft (6.2 m)
- Installed power: 1,200 hp (890 kW)
- Propulsion: Triple expansion steam engine
- Notes: Canadian Official # 126660; American #81427
- GLENLYON
- U.S. National Register of Historic Places
- Location within Michigan Location within the United States
- Location: Glenlyon Shoals off Menagerie Island in Siskiwit Bay, Isle Royale National Park, Michigan
- Coordinates: 47°57′8″N 88°44′53″W
- Area: 91.8 acres (37.2 ha)
- Built: 1893
- Architect: F. W. Wheeler
- Architectural style: Freighter
- MPS: Shipwrecks of Isle Royale National Park TR
- NRHP reference No.: 84001750
- Added to NRHP: June 14, 1984

Glenlyon was a freighter built in 1893; it was sunk off the shore of Isle Royale in Lake Superior in 1924 and the remains are still on the lake bottom. The wreck was placed on the National Register of Historic Places in 1984.

== History ==
The Glenlyon (Canadian Official #126660; American #81427) was constructed in 1893 by F. W. Wheeler & Company as the William H. Gratwick for John Mitcell & Company of Cleveland, Ohio. The ship was a steel-hulled, steam-powered package freighter, 328 feet (100 m) long with a beam of 42.5 feet (13.0 m), a depth of 20.5 feet (6.2 m), and a cargo capacity of 3,800 tons. The ship had two decks and three masts. It was launched on February 4, 1893, and was the first ship to sport one of Wheeler's newly produced engines, a 1,200-horsepower (890 kW) triple expansion steam engine.

The William H. Gratwick was sold multiple times: in 1899, 1902, 1907, and, in 1910 to the Chicago & Duluth Transportation Company. The ship hauled both package freight and bulk cargo, as well as, for a short time, passengers for both U.S. and Canada—an unusual history for a Great Lakes ship. In 1912, Chicago & Duluth renamed the ship Minnekahta. The ship was sold again in 1913, and finally, in 1914, the ship was purchased by the Great Lakes Transportation Company Ltd. of Midland, Ontario, overhauled, and had her name changed to the Glenyon. At the same time, the ship's registry was changed to be Canadian.

On October 30, 1924, the Glenlyon left Thunder Bay, Ontario carrying 143,000 bushels of wheat. The weather turned particularly bad, and the ship was forced to anchor in the Welcome Islands. On the 31st, the captain decided to resume the trip, but the winds picked up again and the Glenlyon headed for shelter in Isle Royale's Siskiwit Bay. In the early morning hours of November 1, 1924 the ship ran aground on the reef now bearing its name off Menagerie Island and near the Isle Royale Light while steaming toward Siskiwit Bay. The ship sent out a distress call, and the captain turned off the pumps to keep the ship settled on the reef. Other vessels from the Great Lakes Transportation fleet rushed to the scene, as well as the Coast Guard, and most of the crew was rescued by late morning. Two crewmembers who had gone overboard in a lifeboat for an unknown reason were missing; a search was made for the men and they were found early the next morning ashore in Siskiwit Bay.

Salvage operations were started, but only 75,000 bushels of cargo were recovered over the next few weeks. The ship's condition deteriorated, and eventually salvage operations were called off. The Glenlyon soon broke in half, and by April of the next year it was completely submerged.

== Wrecksite ==
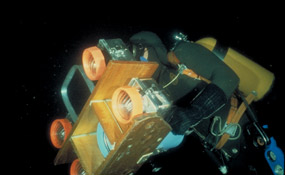
Diving the wreck

The cold waters of the lake have preserved the structure of the ship in 15 to 60 feet (4.6 to 18.3 m) of water. The wreck of the Glenlyon is open to the public and accessible for dives, although it was visited less than 20 times in 2009 out of 1,062 dives made to wrecks in the Isle Royale National Park. The wreckage of the ship is scattered, with the bow section on the bay side of the shoal and the stern section on the lake side. However, pieces of the wreck are easily recognizable, as they are laid out close to their origins on the ship, and nearly the entire ship is still in place. Some large sections of the ship are still intact, including the bow, and the engine room with drive shaft, propeller, engine, and boilers. The cabin is easily recognizable.

The ship is significant as an example of a transitional style vessel, built as typical freighter lengths were rapidly increasing from SS Lakeland at 300 feet (91 m) long in 1886 to 400 feet (120 m) in 1895. It is the only known example of this type and size of vessel available for study. The wreckage of the Glenlyon has been archeologically surveyed multiple times, giving a map of the wreckage, and particularly how parts of the wreckage moves across the lake floor due to currents and ice floes.
