= Cariboo (disambiguation) =

Cariboo is an adapted spelling of the word "caribou" (a North America name for reindeer). The term can refer to:

- Cariboo, an intermontane region of British Columbia, Canada
- Cariboo Mountains, the northernmost subrange of the Columbia Mountains
- Cariboo Plateau, a volcanic plateau in southern-central British Columbia
- Cariboo Heart Range, a mountain subrange in northern British Columbia
- Cariboo Regional District
- Cariboo (federal electoral district), a former electoral district
- Cariboo (provincial electoral district), a former provincial electoral district from 1871 to ?
- Cariboo River, British Columbia
- Cariboo Road
- Cariboo, British Columbia, the old name of Lamming Mills, British Columbia
- Cariboo, an official neighbourhood of the city of Coquitlam, British Columbia
- Cariboo, a former name of Caribou, California, United States, a census-designated place
- Cariboo (ship, 1902), see Boats of the Mackenzie River watershed

== See also ==
- Cariboo Gold Rush, gold rush in the Cariboo region of Canada
- Caribou (disambiguation)
