= Sleeping Giant Provincial Park =

Provincial park in Ontario, Canada

- IUCN category II (national park)
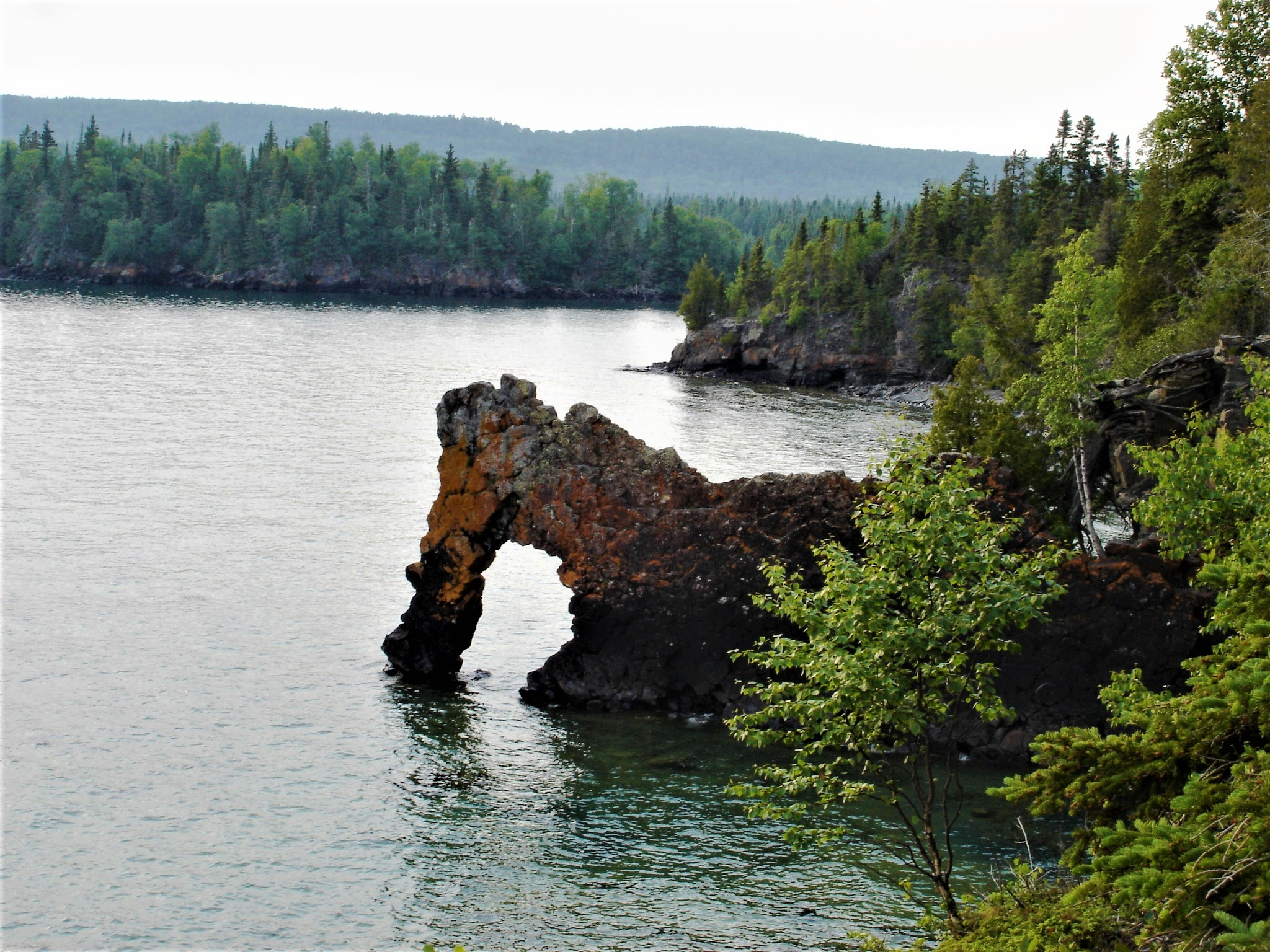
- View overlooking the Sea Lion

- Location within Ontario
- Interactive map of Sleeping Giant Provincial Park
- Location: Thunder Bay District, Ontario, Canada
- Nearest city: Thunder Bay
- Coordinates: 48°20′14″N 88°54′16″W
- Area: 243.91 km^{2} (94.17 sq mi)
- Established: 1944 as Sibley Provincial Park
- Visitors: 84,415 (in 2022)
- Governing body: Ontario Parks
- Website: www.ontarioparks.ca/park/sleepinggiant

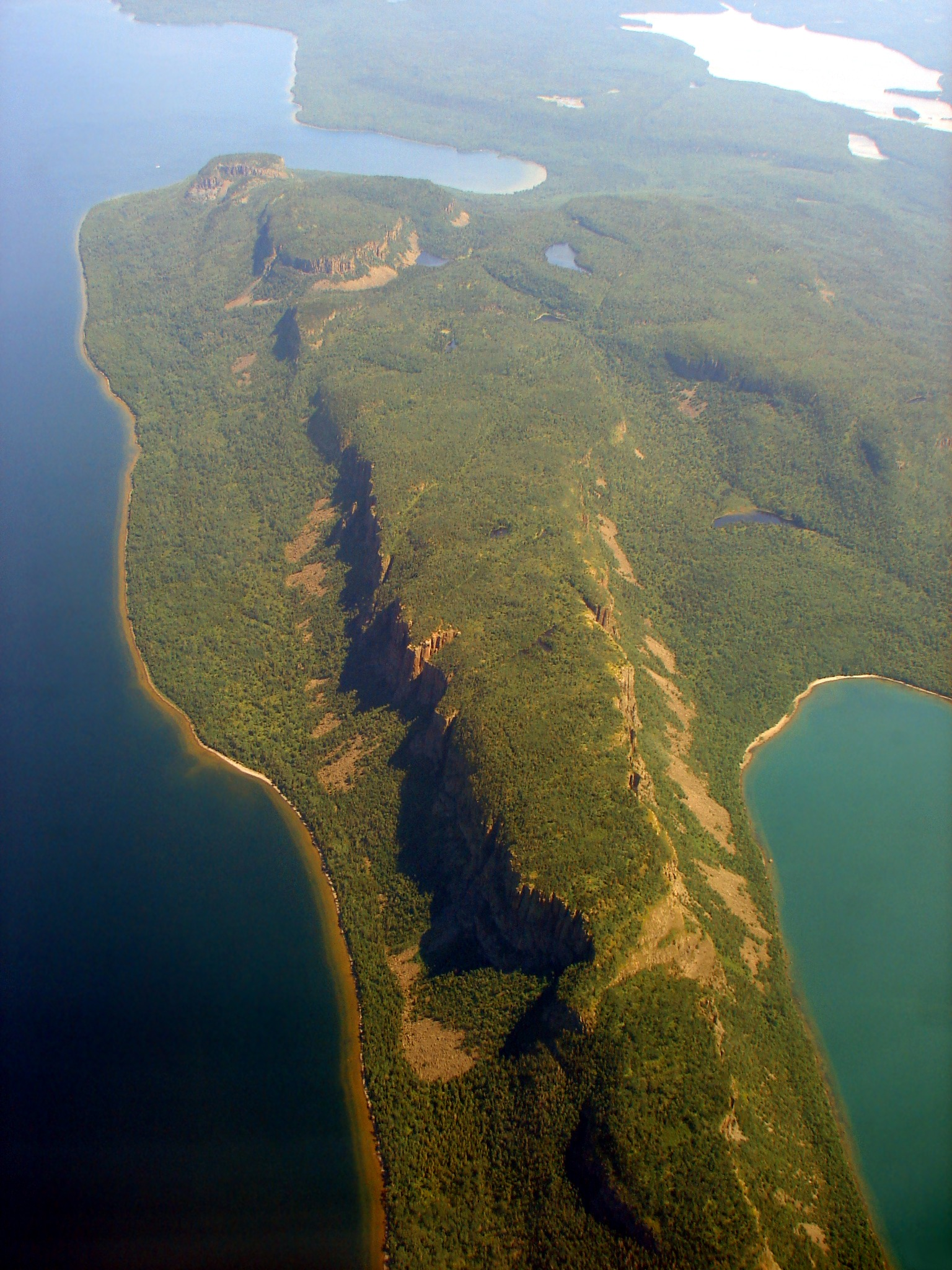
Aerial view of the Sleeping Giant

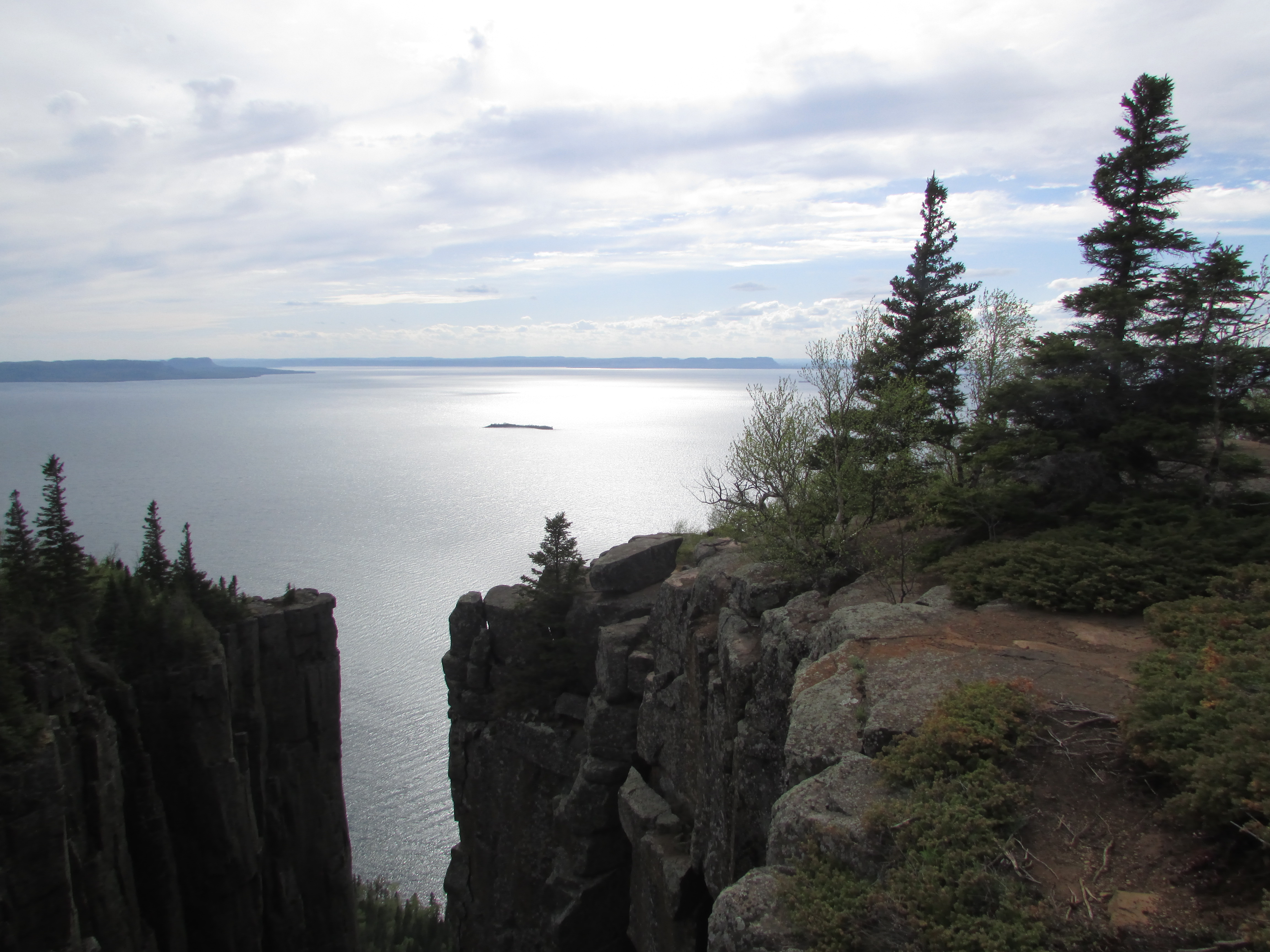
View of Lake Superior and surrounding area from the Top of the Giant trail terminus

Sleeping Giant Provincial Park, established in 1944 as Sibley Provincial Park and renamed in 1988, is a 244-square-kilometre (94 sq mi) park located on the Sibley Peninsula in Northwestern Ontario, east of Thunder Bay. The nearest communities are Pass Lake, in the township of Sibley, located at the northern entrance to the park, and Dorion, located 35 kilometres (22 mi) northwest, in the township of Shuniah. The seasonal community of Silver Islet is located on the southern tip of the peninsula. The primary feature of the park is the Sleeping Giant, which is most visible from the city of Thunder Bay.

The park occupies most of the lower portion of the peninsula excluding the area around the seasonal community of Silver Islet, and a portion of Thunder Cape which is designated as the Thunder Cape Bird Observatory. The eastern portion of the park is lowlands, while the western half is composed of cliffs, valleys, and the mesa–cuestas which make up the Sleeping Giant formation. At its eastern edge, the park borders the Lake Superior National Marine Conservation Area.

== Geography ==
The Sibley Peninsula is 52 kilometres (32 mi) long and 10 kilometres (6 mi) wide. It projects into Lake Superior from the north shore, separating Thunder Bay to the west and Black Bay to the east. The peninsula can be separated into two physiographic areas—highlands and lowlands. The highlands dominate the western half of the peninsula, and rise to 380 metres (1,247 ft) above the surface of Lake Superior. The lowlands of the eastern portion of the peninsula rise to only 75 metres (246 ft), over an area 3 to 6 kilometres (2 to 4 mi) wide. With the exception of diabase dikes and the large diabase sill that forms the upper portion of the Sleeping Giant, the peninsula is underlain by sedimentary rocks, which strike northeast and slope towards the southwest, forming a cuesta.

== Ecology ==
The varied terrain and the effect of Lake Superior on the peninsula's microclimates provide habitats for a wide variety of plants and animals.

Plants found in the park include 23 species of orchids including small round-leaved orchid (Galearis rotundifolia), one of Ontario's rarest species, as well as 22 species of alpine arctic disjuncts.

Wildlife found in the park includes a wide variety of mammals. The most dominant species are white tailed deer and black bears. Close to 200 species of birds have been recorded at the park, and about 75 species are known to nest in the park. The park is also home to a few species of amphibians and reptiles, and many species of fish.

== Activities ==
Sleeping Giant Provincial Park offers numerous recreational activities. The park has more than 100 kilometres (62 mi) of trails, the longest being the 40 kilometres (25 mi) Kabeyun Trail. Summer programs include guided nature walks and group campfires, and films at the park amphitheater. Other activities include boating, fishing, and cycling. The park grooms 50 kilometres (31 mi) of cross-country ski trails in the winter.

== Facilities ==
The park has several camp grounds with more than 240 camp sites. The main camp ground is at Marie Louise Lake, which has 200 camp sites, 85 of which are electric. An additional 40 camp sites are located through the park along its interior trails. The park has a picnic area and beach, and boat ramps, as well as indoor washroom and shower facilities and a laundromat. Canoes, kayaks, paddleboards, and mountain bikes can be rented from the park store.

== Natural Heritage Education ==
Sleeping Giant Provincial Park is part of the Natural Heritage Education program. Primary interpretive themes include the Sleeping Giant formation; the geology of the park and surrounding areas; the legend about the Sleeping Giant; the transitional forest; botanical disjuncts and rarities; the history of Silver Islet; Paleo-Indian occupation of the area and subsequent pre-historic cultures; and wildlife viewing. The program is administered from the visitors centre at the Marie Louise Lake campground.
