= Solomon Sibley =

American politician and judge (1769–1846)

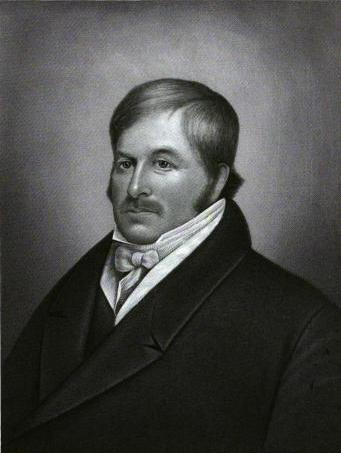

1st Mayor of Detroit, first charter
- In office 1806–1806
- Preceded by: None
- Succeeded by: Elijah Brush

Delegate to the U.S. House of Representatives from Michigan Territory's at-large district
- In office November 20, 1820 – March 3, 1823
- Preceded by: William Woodbridge
- Succeeded by: Gabriel Richard

Personal details
- Born: October 7, 1769 Sutton, Massachusetts, U.S.
- Died: April 4, 1846 (aged 76) Detroit, Michigan, U.S.
- Party: Democratic; Democratic-Republican (before 1825)
- Education: College of Rhode Island and Providence Plantations
- Profession: Lawyer

Solomon Sibley (October 7, 1769 – April 4, 1846) was an American politician and jurist in the Michigan Territory who became the first mayor of Detroit.

== Early life: 1769–1815 ==
Sibley was born in Sutton, Massachusetts, the son of Ruth and Reuben Sibley. After completing preparatory studies, he graduated from the College of Rhode Island and Providence Plantations (now Brown University) at Providence in 1794. He studied law, was admitted to the Bar in 1795 and began a practice in Marietta, Ohio, which was then part of the Northwest Territory. He soon moved to Cincinnati and then moved again to Detroit, Michigan, in 1797, shortly after the British handed over the fort in 1796. When he arrived, Sibley was one of only two lawyers in Detroit. Being a pioneer lawyer was a physically challenging profession, often requiring long travel by horseback through wilderness over Native American trails in all types of weather to attend the territorial courts in Cincinnati, Marietta, or Chillicothe, Ohio.

In December 1798, Detroit elected a delegate to the legislature of the Northwest Territory. This, the first election in Michigan under United States control, was held in a Detroit tavern. Although Sibley was elected, his opponent, James May, claimed he had won by providing liquor for the voters. Despite the protestation, Sibley represented Wayne County in the first legislature of the Northwest Territory, commencing his term in January 1799.

Sibley was instrumental in passing the legislation in 1802 by which Detroit was incorporated as a town. Sibley was elected first as Chairman of the Board of Trustees, and then under the first city charter of 1806 as the first mayor of Detroit. In December 1811, following the Battle of Tippecanoe, Sibley chaired a public meeting which drafted a memorial to the President and Congress, concerning the defenses of Michigan Territory. This memorial called on Congress to prioritize the defense of settlers over the protection of trade routes with Native Americans. After the start of the War of 1812, forts were established at the sites recommended by Sibley. During the war, Sibley commanded a company of riflemen in defense of Detroit, though the British attack was successful and William Hull surrendered the fort. After the war, Sibley served as Auditor of Public Accounts for the Michigan Territory from 1814 to 1817.

== Congressional delegate: 1815–1823 ==
Sibley was appointed as the first United States Attorney for the Michigan Territory by U.S. President James Madison, serving from 1815 to 1823. When William Woodbridge resigned on August 9, 1820, as territorial Delegate to the 16th United States Congress, Sibley was elected to fill the vacancy. Sibley won re-election to the 17th Congress, serving in total from November 20, 1820, to March 3, 1823. Sibley continued to serve as U.S. Attorney, and thus held concurrent legislative and executive positions. During this period, Sibley was also commissioned, along with Lewis Cass, to negotiate the August 29, 1821, Treaty of Chicago with the Ottawa, Potawatomi, and Chippewa, in which the tribes ceded most of their territory south of the Grand River.

== Michigan Supreme Court: 1824–1837 ==
Sibley was not a candidate for re-election to Congress in 1822. In 1824, he was appointed as one of three justices on the Michigan Territorial Supreme Court by U.S. President James Monroe, becoming the sixth Territorial Justice. Sibley was chief justice of the court from 1827 until 1837, when he had to resign due to his deafness.

== Retirement and personal life: 1837–1846 ==
Sibley married Sarah Whipple Sproat Sibley (1782–1851), the only daughter of Colonel Ebenezer Sproat, a veteran of the American Revolutionary War. They had eight children, one of whom, Henry Hastings Sibley (b. 1811), was a territorial delegate from Wisconsin Territory 1848–1849, and from Minnesota Territory 1849–1853, and the first Governor of Minnesota 1858–1860. A second son, Alexander H. Sibley (b. 1817), was the president of the Silver Islet Mining Company which operated a silver mine in Ontario. A daughter, Catherine Whipple Sibley, married Charles Christopher Trowbridge, mayor of Detroit in 1834 and unsuccessful candidate for Governor of Michigan in 1837. A granddaughter, Frances W. Sibley, was a missionary and served as national president of the Girls' Friendly Society.

Sibley died in Detroit and is interred in Elmwood Cemetery there. Upon his death, many members of the Bar wore a badge of mourning for 30 days. Shortly after his death, his widow Sarah built the Sibley House on Jefferson, which still stands.

Political offices
New title	Mayor of Detroit, Michigan; 1806	Succeeded by Elijah Brush
Unknown	Auditor of Michigan Territory; 1814–1817	Unknown
Assembly seats
New district	Member of the Northwest Territory House of Representatives from Wayne County; 1799–1801; Served alongside: Francois Chabert Joncaire, Jacob Visgar	Succeeded by Francois Chabert Joncaire; George McDougall; Jonathan Schieffelin
U.S. House of Representatives
Preceded by William Woodbridge	Delegate to the U.S. House of Representatives from Michigan Territory; November 20, 1820 – March 3, 1823	Succeeded by Gabriel Richard
