= Caribou Island (Thunder Bay) =

Island in Lake Superior, Canada

- Interactive map of Caribou Island

Geography
- Location: Lake Superior
- Coordinates: 48°31′34″N 88°50′58″W

Administration
- Canada
- Territory: Ontario

Demographics
- Population: 0

Caribou Island is an uninhabited island in Lake Superior, approximately 1.5 kilometres (0.93 mi) south of the township of Shuniah, Ontario and approximately 32 kilometres (20 mi) east of the city of Thunder Bay. It is approximately 3.3 kilometres (2.1 mi) long and 0.7 kilometres (0.43 mi) wide, and 371 acres (150 ha) in area. The north shore of the island features steep cliffs leading to an elevated plateau. Atop the plateau lies a small kettle lake.

The island is prominently visible from several points around Thunder Bay, including notably from Sleeping Giant Provincial Park's Caribou Island lookout. The island and its cliffs were featured in Andrew Cividino's 2015 coming-of-age drama Sleeping Giant.

== Conservation ==
The island is described as having a high level of ecological value serving as home to a mature forest and endangered species. While white tail deer have been known to inhabit the island, despite its name, the island is not known to be inhabited by any caribou. In 2014 the Nature Conservancy of Canada purchased 65 ha (161 acres) of the island along its southern shore for the purposes of nature conservation. The island contains some hiking trails and, like other Nature Conservancy of Canada properties, is open to the public.
