= Belden, California =

- Unincorporated community Census designated place
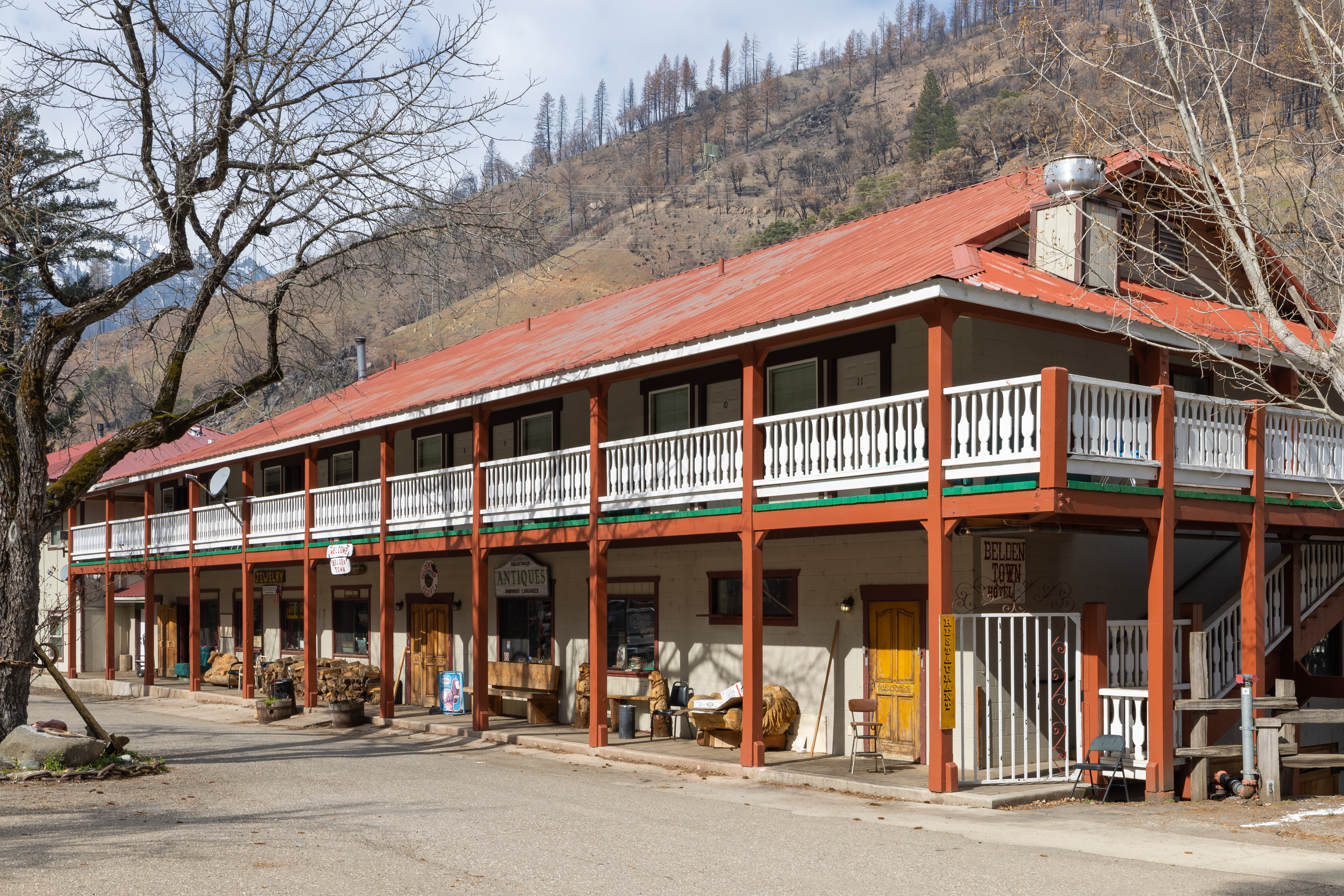
- The Belden Town Hotel in February 2022

- Location in Plumas County and the state of California

- Location in the United States Belden, California (the United States)
- Coordinates: 40°0′23″N 121°15′9″W
- Country: United States
- State: California
- County: Plumas

Area
  - Total: 0.73 sq mi (1.88 km^{2})
  - Land: 0.61 sq mi (1.58 km^{2})
  - Water: 0.12 sq mi (0.30 km^{2}) 15.95%
- Elevation: 2,221 ft (677 m)

Population (2020)
  - Total: 15
  - Density: 25/sq mi (9.5/km^{2})
- Time zone: UTC-8 (Pacific (PST))
  - Summer (DST): UTC-7 (PDT)
- ZIP code: 95915
- Area codes: 530, 837
- FIPS code: 06-04856
- GNIS feature IDs: 266440; 2407822

Belden is a unincorporated community in Plumas County, California, United States. Belden is located on the Feather River Route and the North Fork Feather River, 7 miles (11.3 km) southwest of Caribou. For statistical purposes, the United States Census Bureau has defined Belden as a census-designated place (CDP). The population was 15 at the 2020 census, down from 22 in 2010.

== History ==
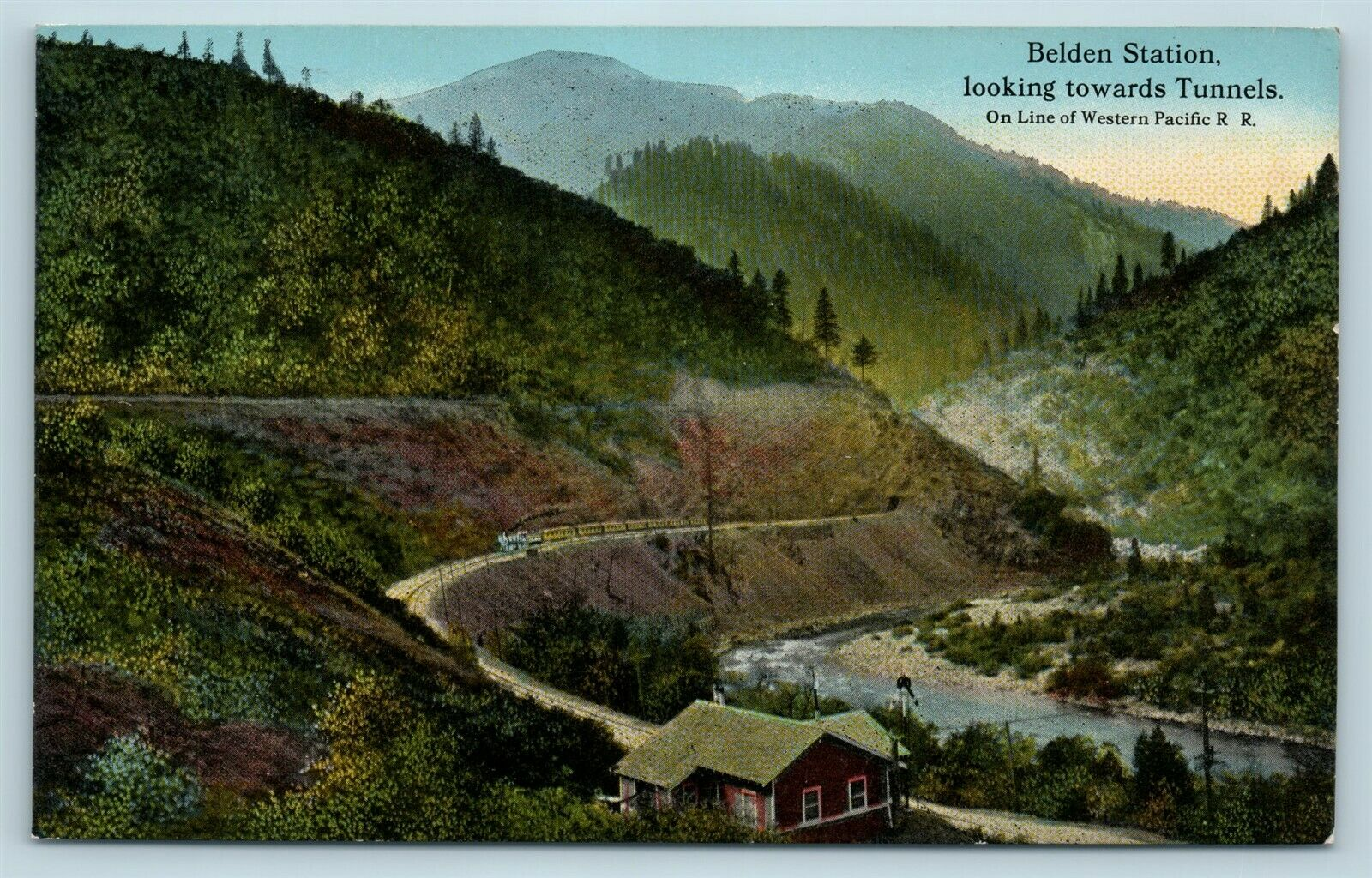
1915 postcard of Belden station

The Belden post office opened in 1909. The name honors Robert Belden, its first postmaster.

Prospector Ivan Coffman bought the community in 1989 and put it up for sale in 2026.

== Geography ==
According to the United States Census Bureau, the CDP has a total area of 0.7 square miles (1.8 km^{2}), of which 0.6 square miles (1.6 km^{2}) is land and 0.1 square miles (0.26 km^{2}) (15.95%) is water.

== Demographics ==
Historical population
Census	Pop.	Note	%±
2000	26		—
2010	22		−15.4%
2020	15		−31.8%
U.S. Decennial Census; 1850–1870 1880-1890; 1900 1910 1920; 1930 1940 1950; 1960 1970 1980; 1990 2000 2010

Belden first appeared as a census designated place in the 2000 U.S. census.

=== Racial and ethnic composition ===
Belden CDP, California – Racial and ethnic composition Note: the US Census treats Hispanic/Latino as an ethnic category. This table excludes Latinos from the racial categories and assigns them to a separate category. Hispanics/Latinos may be of any race.
Race / Ethnicity (NH = Non-Hispanic)	Pop 2000	Pop 2010	Pop 2020	% 2000	% 2010	% 2020
White alone (NH)	26	20	8	100.00%	90.91%	53.33%
Black or African American alone (NH)	0	0	0	0.00%	0.00%	0.00%
Native American or Alaska Native alone (NH)	0	0	1	0.00%	0.00%	6.67%
Asian alone (NH)	0	0	0	0.00%	0.00%	0.00%
Native Hawaiian or Pacific Islander alone (NH)	0	0	0	0.00%	0.00%	0.00%
Other race alone (NH)	0	0	0	0.00%	0.00%	0.00%
Mixed race or Multiracial (NH)	0	2	0	0.00%	9.09%	0.00%
Hispanic or Latino (any race)	0	0	6	0.00%	0.00%	40.00%
Total	26	22	15	100.00%	100.00%	100.00%

=== 2020 census ===
As of the 2020 census, Belden had a population of 15. The population density was 24.6 inhabitants per square mile (9.5/km^{2}). The median age was 35.5 years. 26.7% of residents were under the age of 18, 46.7% were aged 25 to 64, and 26.7% of residents were 65 years of age or older. For every 100 females there were 15.4 males, and for every 100 females age 18 and over there were 10.0 males age 18 and over.

0.0% of residents lived in urban areas, while 100.0% lived in rural areas.

There were 9 households in Belden, of which 33.3% had children under the age of 18 living in them. Of all households, 11.1% were married-couple households, 33.3% were households with a male householder and no spouse or partner present, and 44.4% were households with a female householder and no spouse or partner present. About 55.5% of all households were made up of individuals and 44.4% had someone living alone who was 65 years of age or older.

There were 11 housing units, of which 18.2% were vacant. Of occupied units, 5 were owner-occupied and 4 were renter-occupied. The homeowner vacancy rate was 0.0% and the rental vacancy rate was 0.0%.

== Media ==
The primary local news source is The Plumas Sun, a nonprofit news website. The century-old Feather River Bulletin newspaper shuttered in 2023.

== Government ==
In the state legislature Belden is located in the 1st senatorial district, represented by Republican Megan Dahle, and the 1st Assembly district, represented by Republican Heather Hadwick.

Federally, Belden is in California's 3rd congressional district, represented by Independent Kevin Kiley.

== Education ==
The school district is Plumas Unified School District.
