= Frances W. Sibley =

American missionary and nonprofit leader (1867–1958)

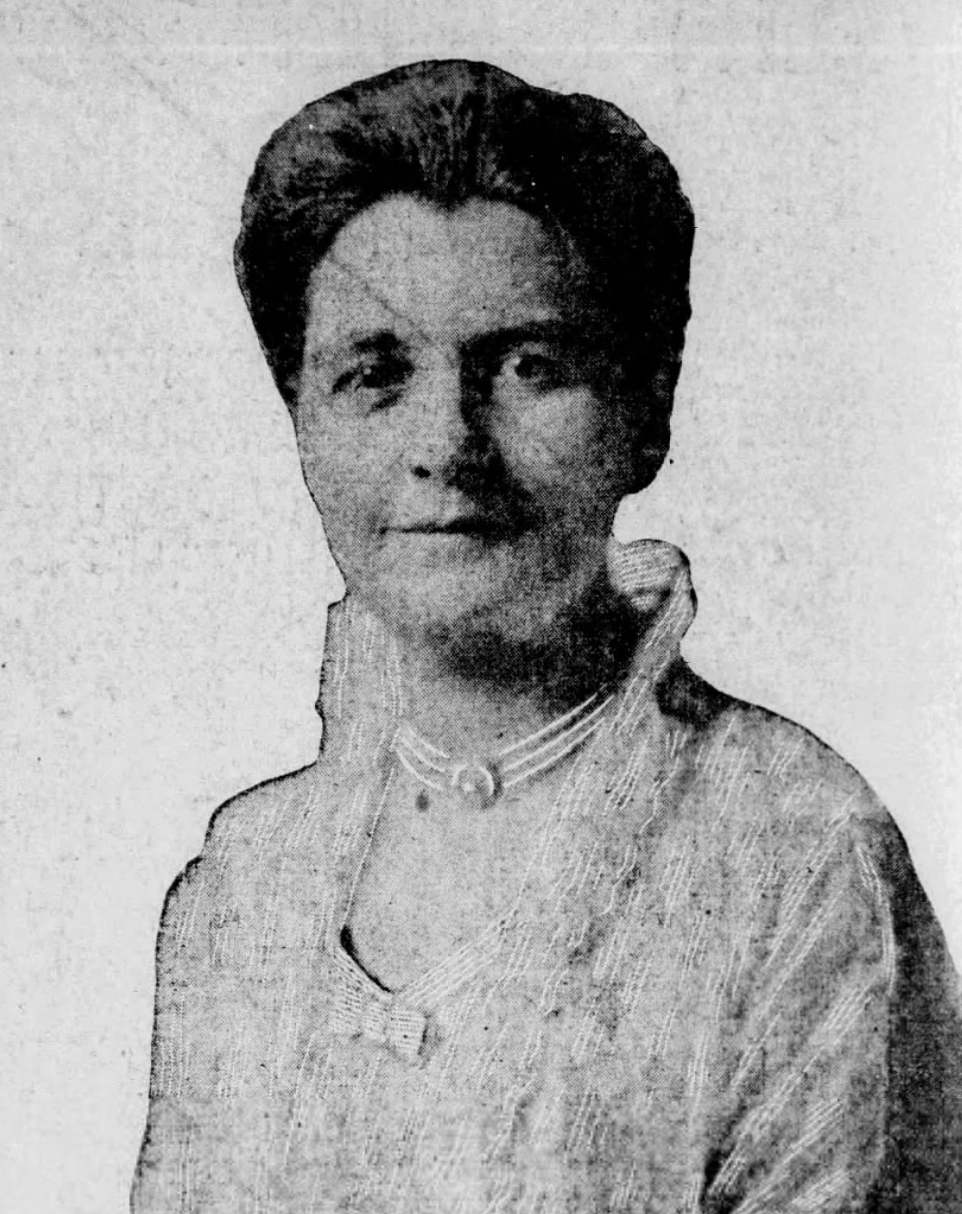
- Sibley in 1914
- Born: Frances Wythes Sibley; January 24, 1867
- Died: January 8, 1958 (aged 90); Michigan, U.S.
- Occupations: missionary; nonprofit leader
- Known for: National President, Girls' Friendly Society in America
- Father: Alexander H. Sibley
- Relatives: Solomon Sibley (grandfather)

Frances W. Sibley (January 24, 1867 – January 8, 1958) was an American missionary and nonprofit leader associated with city, state, and national organizations. Associated with the Episcopal Church's Girls' Friendly Society in America (GFSA) for many years, she served as Michigan State President for two decades and National President for another dozen years.

== Early life ==
Frances Wythes Sibley was born January 24, 1867, and grew up in Detroit's Sibley House. Her parents were Alexander H. Sibley and Marie Louise (née, Miller) Sibley. Her grandfather was Solomon Sibley, the city's first honorary mayor.

== Career ==
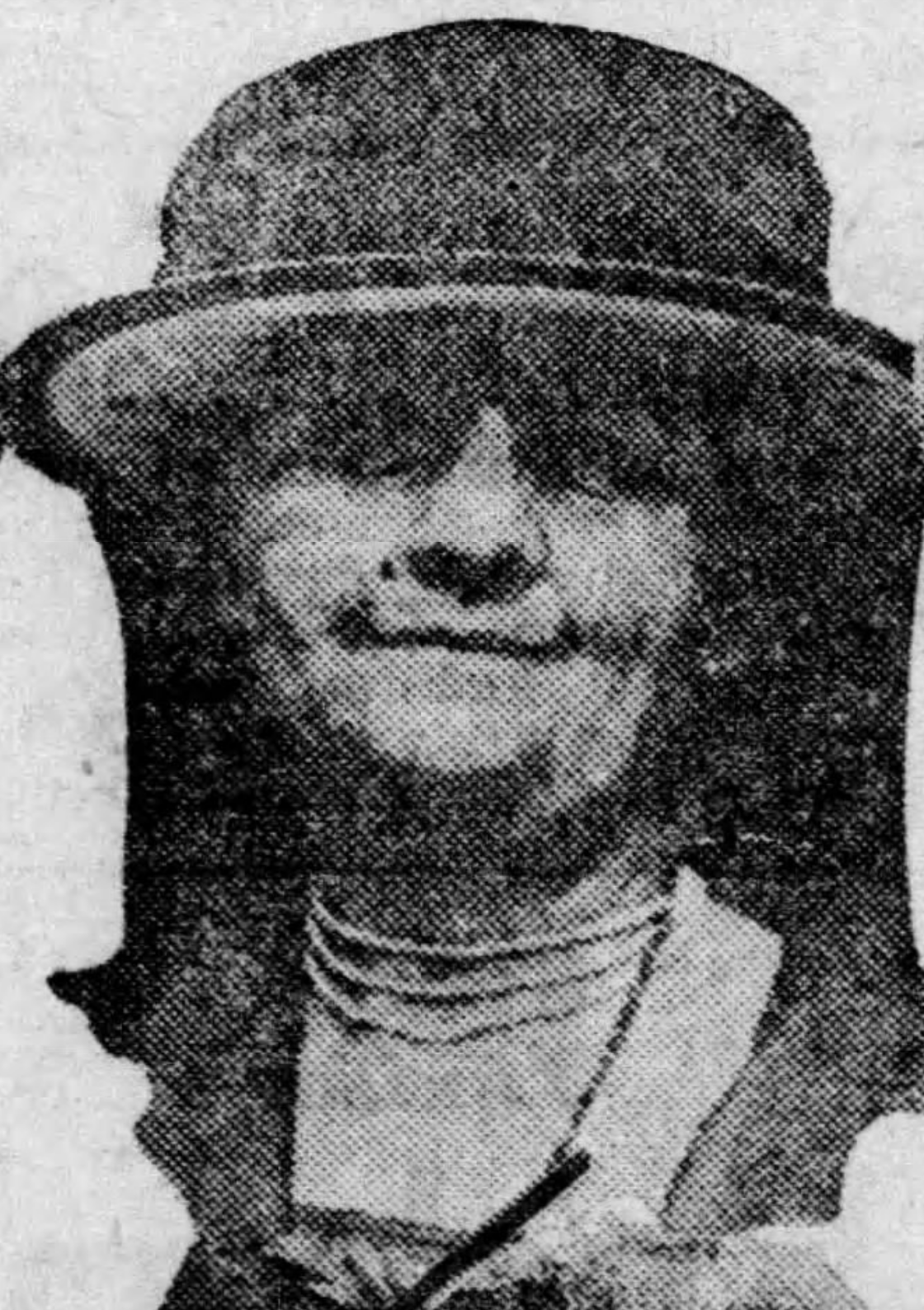
Sibley in 1922

In 1898–1899, working with Bishop Charles Brent, Sibley established the first schools of the Episcopal Church in the Philippines. In her role as the Michigan diocesan president of the GFSA, Sibley went to Manila in that winter, giving her services for a year during Deaconess Margaret Routledge's furlough at home.

She served as Michigan state president (20 years) and National President (12 years) of the GFSA, being elected to the high office in 1914. She was also the chair, woman's campaign committee, Detroit chapter of the American Red Cross (1917); President and Charter Member of the Tuesday Musical Club; President, auxiliary committee, Detroit Symphony Society; Vice President and Honorary Lifetime Member of the Detroit Symphony Orchestra; and member of Detroit's Arts and Crafts Society.

== Personal life ==
In 1931, while living in Grosse Pointe, Michigan, she took a three-month trip to Europe.

Frances Sibley never married. She died January 8, 1958.

== Awards and honors ==
- 1951, Bishop's Silver Cross

== Selected works ==
- "The House of the Holy child, Manila", Spirit of Mission, 1910
