= Caribou Mountain =

Caribou Mountain or Mount Caribou may refer to:

- Caribou Mountain (Franklin County, Maine), USA; a mountain on the Canada-United States border
- Caribou Mountain (Lincoln County, Maine), USA; a mountain, see List of mountains in Lincoln County, Montana (A-L)
- Caribou Mountain (Idaho), USA; highest point of the Caribou Mountains range
  - Caribou Range, USA; a mountain range in Caribou Forest, Idaho; a subrange of the Rocky Mountains
- Caribou Mountain, Klamath Mountains, California, USA; a mountain
- Caribou Mountain (Temagami), Ontario, Canada; a mountain in Temagami
- Mount Caribou (Quebec), Canada; a mountain in Quebec; containing a headwater feeding to Lac aux Araignées

== See also ==
- Cariboo Mountains (British Columbia), Canada; a mountain range, a subrange of the Columbia Mountains
- Caribou (disambiguation)
- Caribou Mountains (disambiguation)
