= St. Nicholas Orthodox Church (Minnesota) =

Historic church in Minnesota, United States

- U.S. National Register of Historic Places
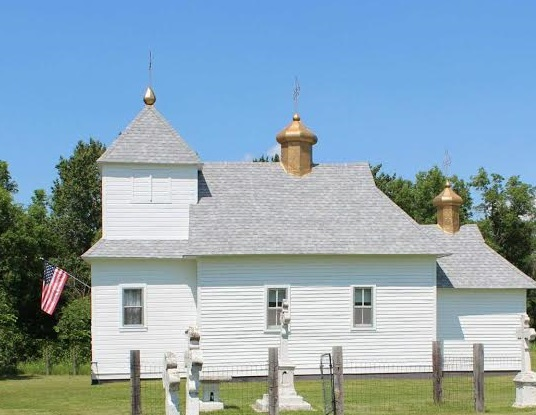

- Location within Minnesota Location within the United States
- Nearest city: Caribou, Minnesota
- Coordinates: 48°58′56″N 96°27′5″W
- Area: 1.8 acres (0.73 ha)
- Built: 1905
- NRHP reference No.: 84001480
- Added to NRHP: March 8, 1984

St. Nicholas Orthodox Church is a historic Eastern Orthodox church in Caribou, Minnesota, United States. It was built in 1905 by Ukrainian American immigrants. The church features an entrance tower and two onion domes atop its sanctuary and apse; the domes are both topped by crosses. The church was used for services through the 1940s and has since only been used for occasional events.

The church was added to the National Register of Historic Places in 1984.
