= Silver Islet =

Small island and community in Ontario, Canada

Coordinates: 48°20′N 88°49′W

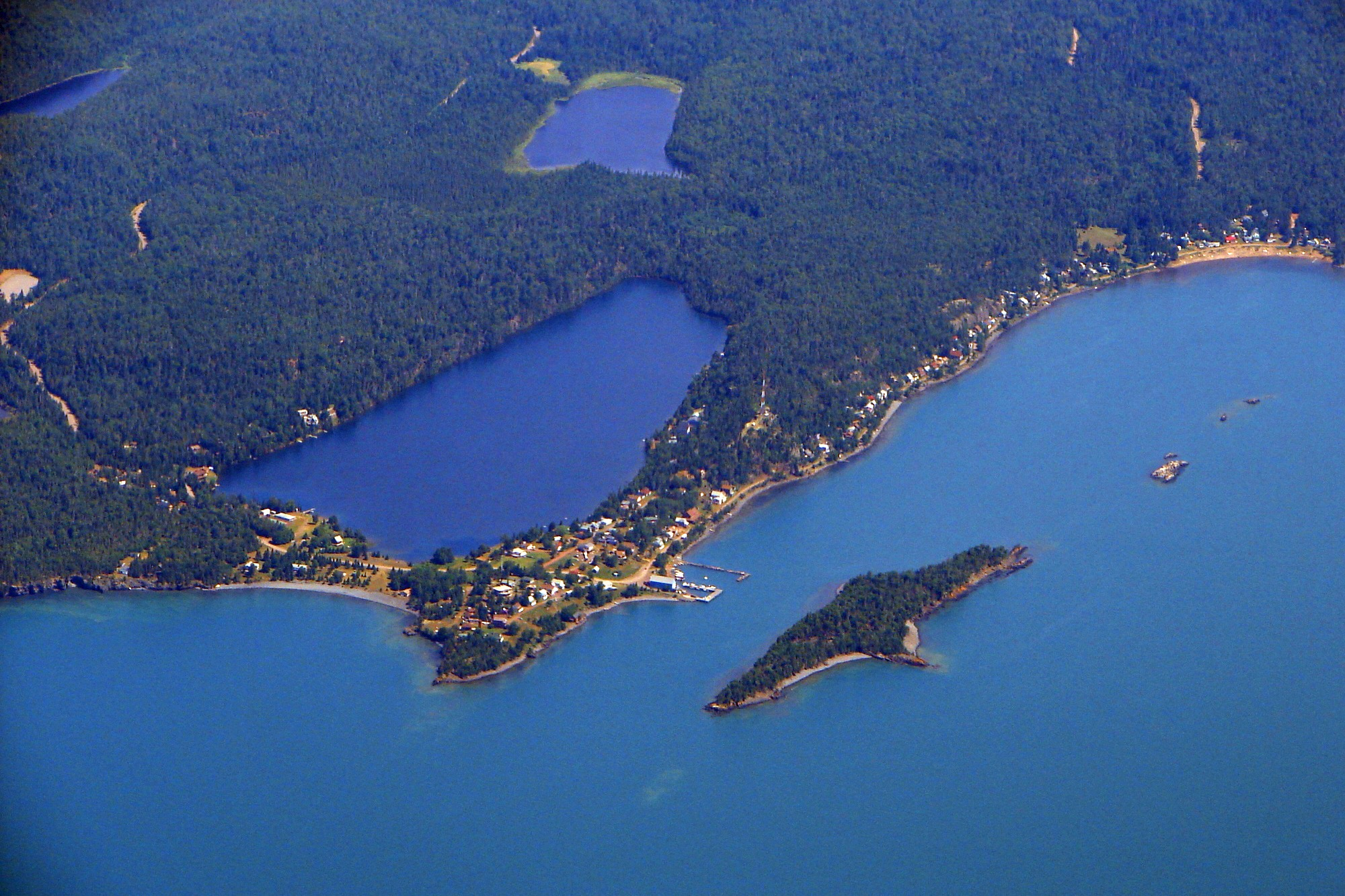
Aerial view of the community of Silver Islet

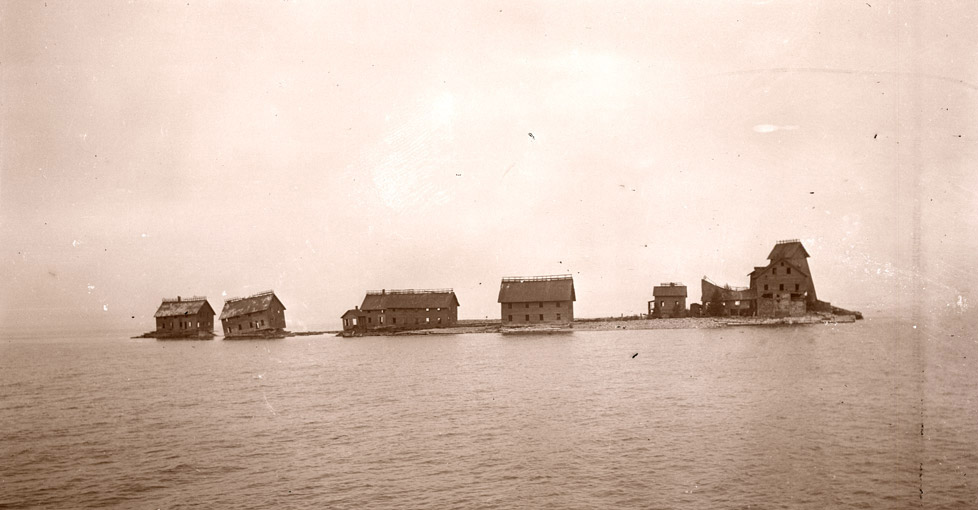
Silver Islet, circa 1911

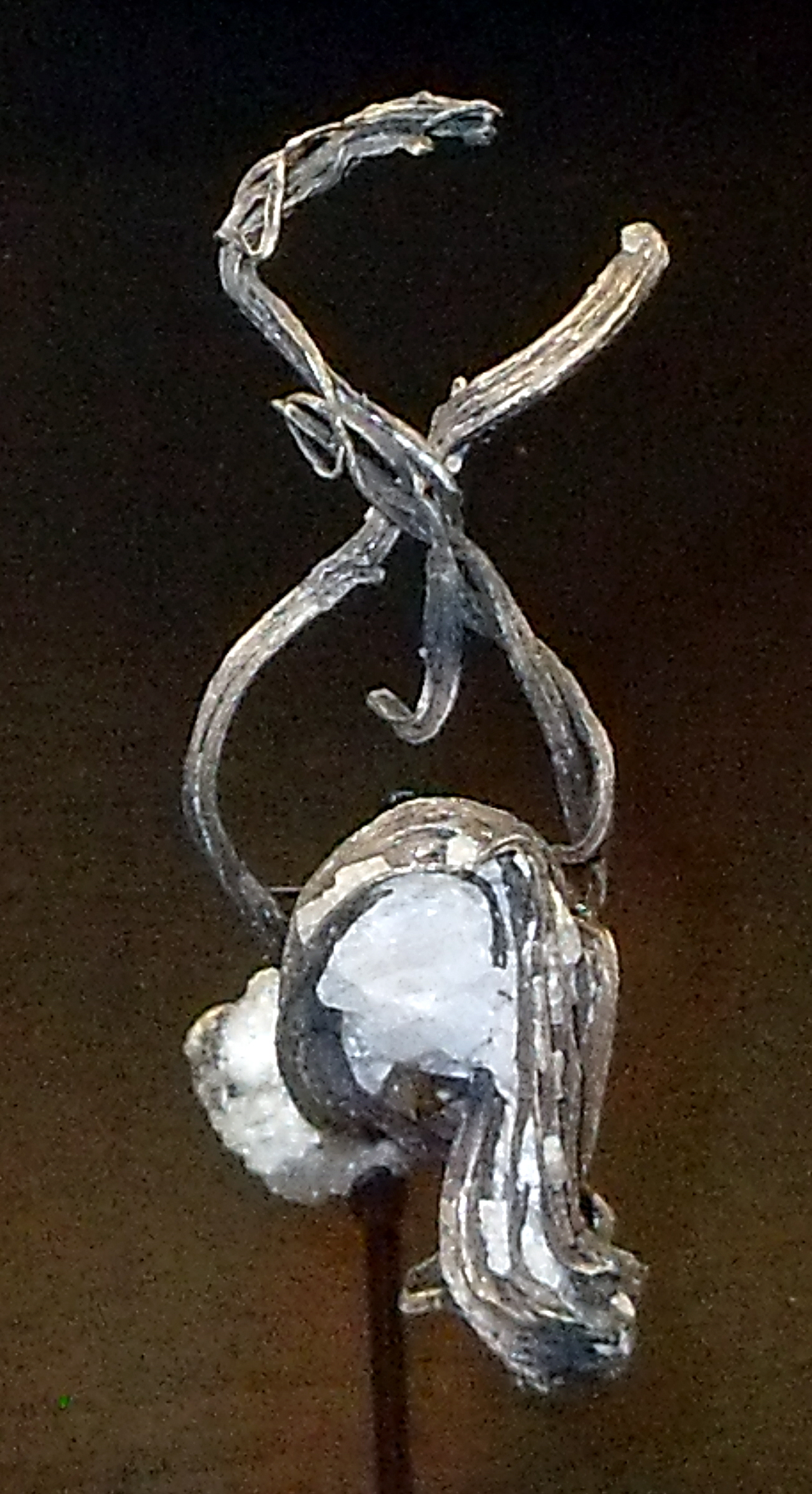
Wire silver from the Silver Islet mine, on display at the Canadian Museum of Nature

Silver Islet refers to both a small rocky island and a small community located near the tip of the Sibley Peninsula in northwestern Ontario, Canada.

A rich vein of nearly pure silver was discovered on this small island in 1868 by the Montreal Mining Company. At that time, the island was approximately 50 m^{2} (540 sq ft) in size and only 2.5 metres (8 ft 2 in) above the waters of Lake Superior. In 1870, the site was developed by Alexander H. Sibley's Silver Islet Mining Company which built wooden breakwaters around the island to hold back the lake's waves and increased the island's area substantially with crushed rock. The islet was expanded to over 10 times its original size and a small mining town was built up on the shore nearby.

After most of the purest ore from the original site had been removed, a second vein was discovered in 1878. By 1883, most of the highest quality silver had been extracted and the price of silver had declined. The final straw came when a shipment of coal did not arrive before the end of the shipping season. The pumps holding back the waters of the lake stopped and in early 1884 the islet's mine shafts, which had reached a depth of 384 metres, were flooded. They would never be de-watered, and the mine's underground operations would never be reopened.

Over the 16 years that the mine was in operation, $3.25 million worth of silver was extracted.

The houses originally built to house miners are now used as private summer cottages. The general store has been restored, and serves light meals in its tea-room, in addition to selling a variety of knickknacks and basic foodstuffs.

As recounted in an article written by Syd Hancock on January 21, 1972, on the occasion of Julian Cross's death, Silver Islet is the home of Julian (Jules) Cross, the founder of Steep Rock Iron Mine in Atikokan, Ontario. Outside the Atikokan Library & museum is a bronze plaque erected by the Ontario Department of Public Records and Archives to mark the historical significance of the Steep Rock Iron Range. On December 29, 1971, the man who unveiled this plaque, and made possible the Steep Rock story, Julian Gifford Cross, died at the age of 83. Born at Silver Islet on July 25, 1888, only four years after the closing of the mine, his destiny and the future of many others was inevitably associated with mining.

Sleeping Giant Provincial Park has an exhibit in its visitor centre, detailing the structure and history of the mine.

There is speculation that much silver remains to be recovered at this location, but attempts to reopen the mine in 1919 and the 1970s (reprocessing mine tailings) were not successful.

The Silver Islet Mine was also where "Vanners" were first used commercially to extract metal from low-grade ore. Known as the "Frue Vanner" as it was named for W. B. Frue, Superintendent of the Silver Islet Mine, who developed the system, it was first installed at the "Stamp Mill" beside "Frue's Brook" on the mainland. Modern versions of the Frue Vanner are still in use today.

== In popular culture ==
Silver Islet, specifically the missing coal shipment in 1883, is the subject of the Tanglefoot song "One More Night".

Silver Islet is featured as the hometown of Sarah, a waitress, in Jane Urquhart's novel The Underpainter.

== Bibliography ==
- Barr, Elinor (c. 1988). Silver Islet: striking it rich in Lake Superior. Toronto: Natural Heritage/Natural History.
- MacDonald, Bill (2008). Excavating for a mine: Silver Islet, 1868–2008: 140th anniversary. Thunder Bay, Ontario: Porphyry Press.
- Macfarlane, Thomas (1880). Silver Islet. Montreal: Dawson Bros.

== See also ==
- Sleeping Giant
