= Alexander H. Sibley =

American businessman (1817–1878)

Alexander Hamilton Sibley (October 17, 1817 – July 10, 1878) was the president of the Silver Islet Mining Company which operated a silver mine on the Sibley Peninsula in northwestern Ontario, which was purchased from the Montreal Mining Company after they had decided the mine was an "engineering nightmare" and sold it to Silver Islet Mining for $225,000.

Sibley was born in Detroit in 1817, the son of the first mayor of Detroit, Solomon Sibley. He was the brother of the first governor of Minnesota, Henry Hastings Sibley.

From 1870 until his death in 1878, Sibley lived in Detroit and spent his summers at the mine. He died in New York City in 1878, with William Frue by his side. His daughter, Frances was a missionary and served as national president of the Girls' Friendly Society.
