= Caribou, Minnesota =

Unincorporated community in Minnesota, United States

Caribou
- Unincorporated community
- Location within Minnesota Location within the United States
- Coordinates: 48°58′57″N 96°26′58″W
- Country: United States
- State: Minnesota
- County: Kittson County
- Township: Caribou
- Elevation: 1,017 ft (310 m)
- Time zone: UTC-6 (Central (CST))
  - Summer (DST): UTC-5 (CDT)
- ZIP code: 56735
- Area code: 218
- GNIS feature ID: 654628

Caribou is an unincorporated community in Caribou Township, Kittson County, Minnesota, United States.

The community is located northeast of Lancaster, along Kittson County Road 4, near its junction with Kittson County Road 53.

Caribou is located along the Roseau River in northeast Kittson County, 1.2 miles (1.9 km) south of the Canada–United States border.

Nearby places include Lancaster, Lake Bronson, Greenbush, and Badger.

== History ==
The community of Caribou was settled in the early 1900s by Ukrainian immigrants.

St. Nicholas Orthodox Church in Caribou is listed on the National Register of Historic Places.
