= Caribou Mountains =

Caribou Mountains can refer to:

- Caribou Mountains (Alberta) a mountain range in Alberta, Canada
  - Caribou Mountains Wildland Park, a park within these mountains
- Caribou Range a mountain range in Idaho, United States

== See also ==
- Caribou Mountain (disambiguation)
- Cariboo Mountains a mountain range of the Columbia Mountains, British Columbia
  - Cariboo Mountains Provincial Park, a park within these mountains
- Cariboo Heart Range
