= Pie Island =

Island in Ontario, Canada

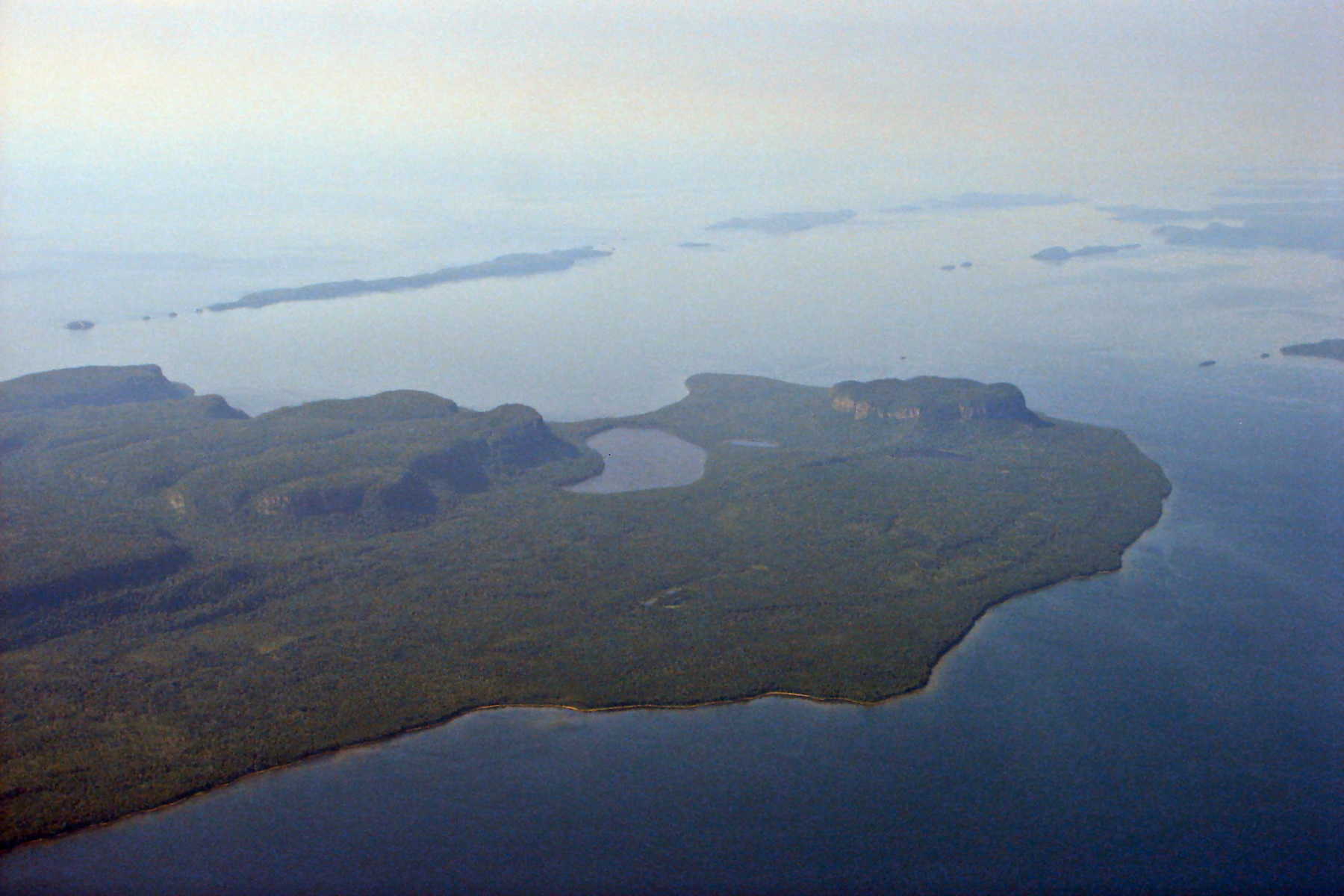
- Aerial view of Pie Island, with its mesas visible

- Location within Ontario

Geography
- Location: Lake Superior
- Coordinates: 48°14′32″N 89°06′09″W
- Area: 46 km^{2} (18 sq mi)
- Length: 12 km (7.5 mi)
- Highest elevation: 438 m (1437 ft)
- Highest point: Le Pâté mesa

Administration
- Canada
- Province: Ontario
- District: Thunder Bay

Demographics
- Population: uninhabited

Pie Island (French: Île Pâté, or simply Le Pâté) is an island in Lake Superior, Ontario, Canada, located about 10 kilometres (6.2 mi) south of Thunder Bay and 25 kilometres (16 mi) north of Isle Royale, Michigan. It is about 12 kilometres (7.5 mi) long with an area of 46 square kilometres (18 sq mi). Pie Island is readily visible from the shoreline and high parts of the city of Thunder Bay.

When a municipality was created in 1873 by the Ontario Legislature to govern the settlements around Thunder Bay, Pie Island was included in the Municipality of Shuniah. It formed part of Island Ward until 1936 when the Island Ward was abolished by the Ontario Legislature at the request of the municipality. After a land claim which ended in 2011, much of the island has been returned to the Fort William First Nation.

There are a number of summer cottages located on the southern tip of the island.

== Etymology and geography ==
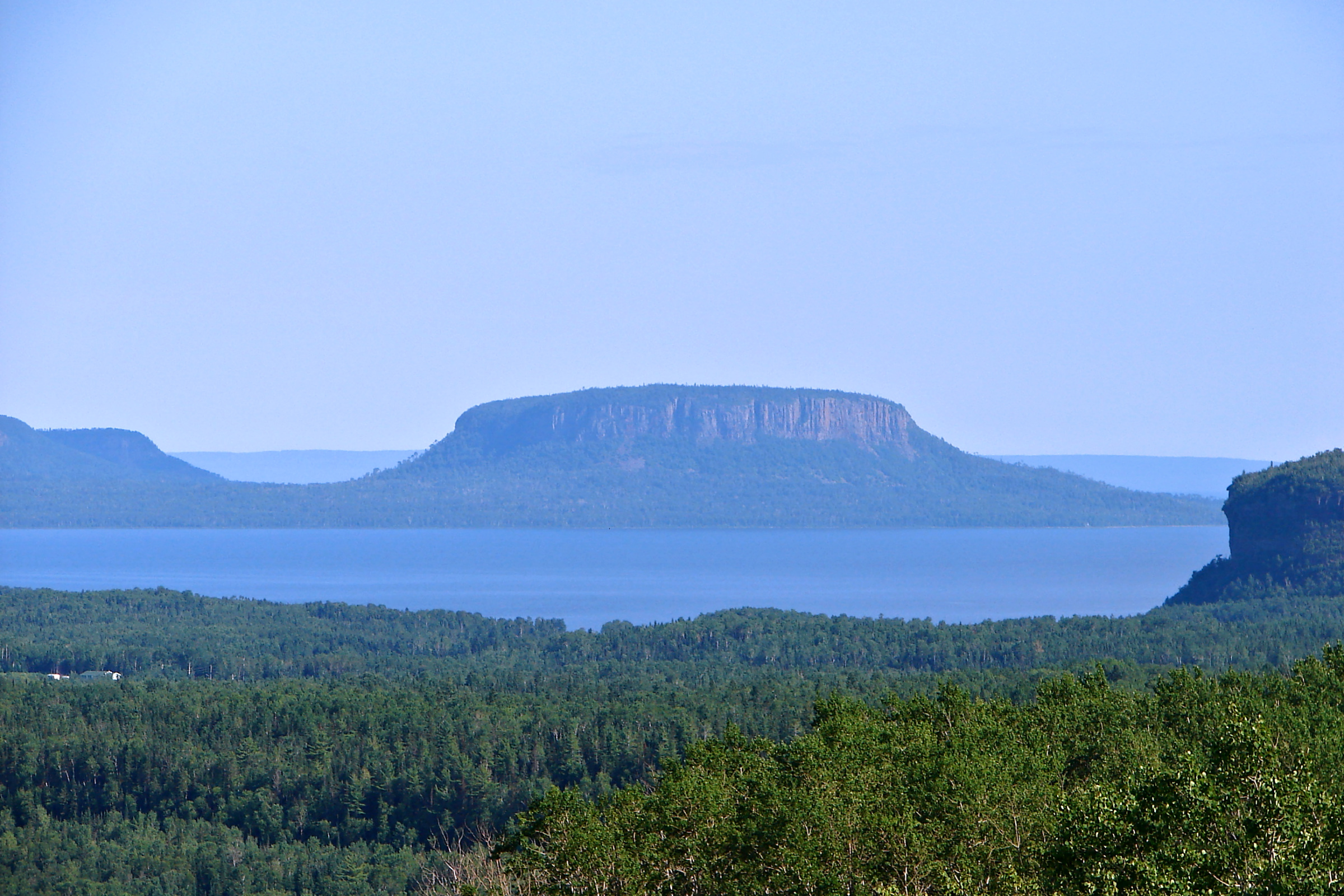
Le Pâté mesa

The English name 'Pie' is an approximate translation of the French Le Pâté, which normally refers to a meat pie with a crust. "Le Pate is the westernmost mesa on Pie Island, and also the highest. Formed by a diabase sill, the mesa is cliffed on all sides and rises to a height of 450 metres (1,460 ft) above sea level. Most of the mesa is flat on the top, but towards the edges begin to slope downwards. Also, there are several gullies which dissect the mountain top. Vegetation has been left to mature, owing to the inaccessibility of Pie Island to normal human traffic and the difficult climb to the top of the mesa. Wind is a major factor governing the height and form of vegetation on the mesa." [Noble 1980]

== Mining and agriculture ==
In the 19th century the island was extensively prospected for silver. Algoma M.P. Simon James Dawson had a mine there (location no 19). Augustine W. Daby of Massachusetts took charge of the Pie Island Silver Mining Company in July 1881 until its sale by sheriff in February 1884 and November 1885. John McKellar also mined there. Lawyer Francis Henry Keefer, a son-in-law of Daby, and his brother Thomas Keefer had a farm where they grew hay as early as 1888. Keefer Point and Dawson Bay on the island are named after the two politicians.

== Lighthouse ==
A lighthouse was established here in 1895 at the west end of the island. In July 1904, the Dominion government relocated the lighthouse to the north point of the island so that it could be seen for a greater distance. It has been replaced with a light on a five-metre skeletal tower. The original lighthouse was demolished in the summer of 2010, after being abandoned since 1953.

== Fort William First Nation land claim ==
Pie Island falls within the land claim of the Fort William First Nation, who were allocated reserve lands in the Robinson Treaty of 1850. In 1853, the government surveyor for the original treaty recommended the that Pie island be included as part of the reserve, but his recommendation was never acted upon. Negotiations between Canada, Ontario and the First Nation began in 2000 and concluded in December 2011. Ontario has transferred the provincial Crown land on Flatland Island and Pie Island, including Le Pate Provincial Nature Reserve (250 ha), to the Fort William First Nation. Regarding the agreement, Chief Peter Collins said "Fort William First Nation, Canada and Ontario worked hard to bring this claim home. Now we have the land and resources that our First Nation needs to create businesses, employment and other opportunities which will benefit our members and the entire Thunder Bay area. The promises in the Treaty of 1850 about our reserve have finally been fulfilled." As part of the land claim, Flatland Island to the southeast was also returned to the First Nation.

Privately owned land on the southern tip of the island was not subject to the land claim.
