= North Caribou Lake =

Lake in Ontario, Canada

- Location within Ontario
- Location: Ontario
- Coordinates: 52.799°N 90.739°W
- Basin countries: Canada

North Caribou Lake is a lake in northwestern Kenora District, Ontario, Canada.

== See also ==
- List of lakes in Ontario
- North Caribou Lake First Nation
