= Sibley Peninsula =

Peninsula in Ontario, Canada

Coordinates: 48°20′14″N 88°54′16″W

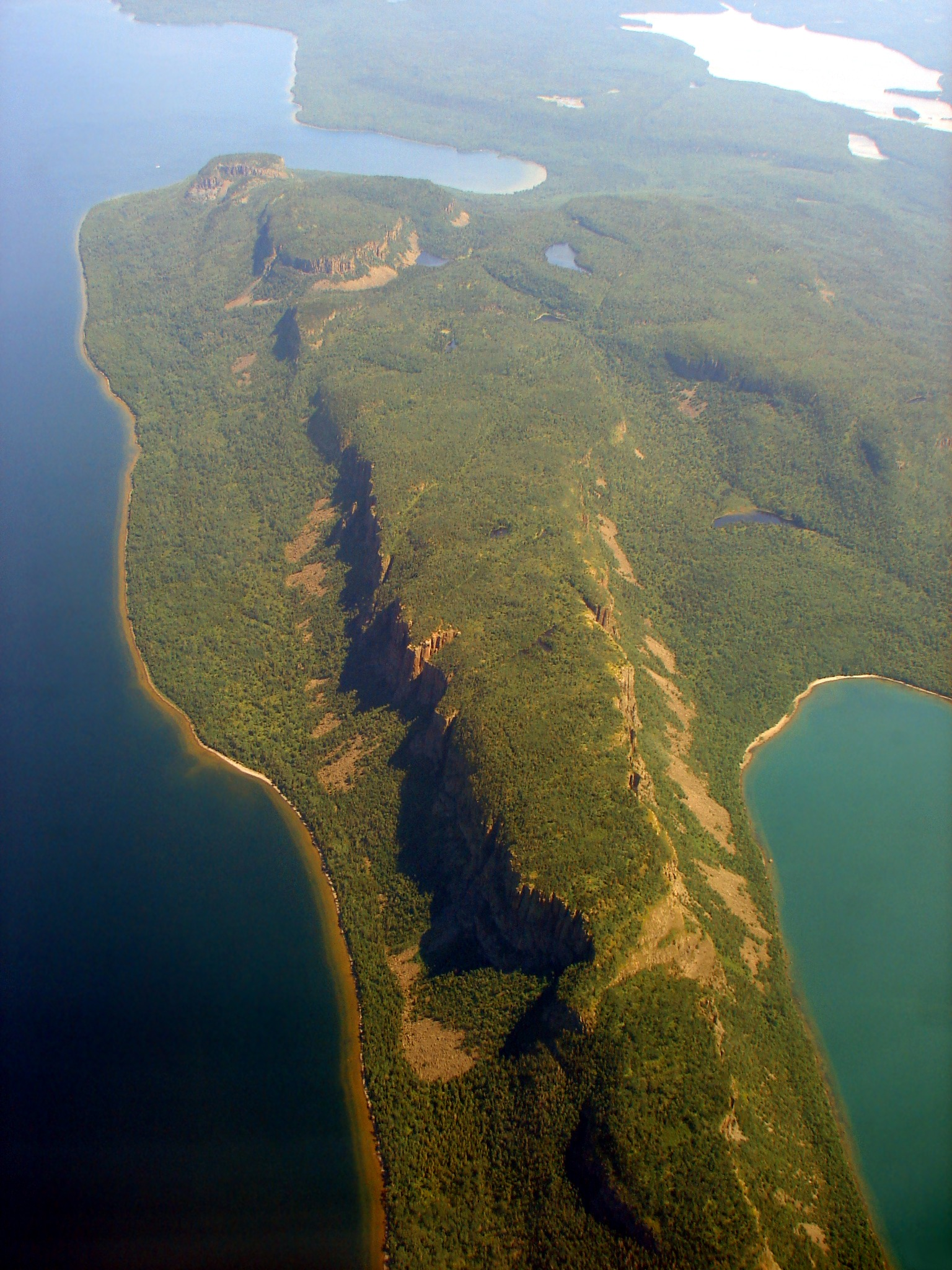
Aerial view of the Sleeping Giant, the southernmost part of Sibley Peninsula

The Sibley Peninsula is a 52-kilometre-long (32 mi) and 10-kilometre-wide (6.2 mi) peninsula in Ontario, Canada, on Lake Superior. It projects into the lake from Superior's north shore, and separates Thunder Bay to the west from Black Bay to the east.

Sleeping Giant Provincial Park occupies most of the peninsula, while the actual Sleeping Giant rock formation, which resembles a human figure lying on its back, forms the southernmost extension of the peninsula. Twenty native fish species are known from lakes within the park.

Also on the peninsula are the Thunder Cape Bird Observatory, at its southern tip, and the small town of Silver Islet. Highway 587 runs along the peninsula from Highway 17 to Silver Islet. The peninsula was named after Alexander H. Sibley, president of the Silver Islet Mining Company that developed a mine there.

== Geology ==
The peninsula can be separated into two physiographic areas—highlands and lowlands. The highlands dominate the western half of the peninsula, and rise to 380 metres (1,247 ft) above the surface of Lake Superior. The lowlands of the eastern portion of the peninsula rise to only 75 metres (246 ft), over an area 3 to 6 kilometres (1.9 to 3.7 mi) wide. With the exception of diabase dikes and the large diabase sill that forms the upper portion of the Sleeping Giant, the peninsula is underlain by sedimentary rocks, which strike northeast and slope towards the southwest, forming a cuesta.

== History ==
Sibley Peninsula (pronounced Syb-Lee) has archaeological sites from Paleoindian, arachaic, and woodland settlements. In 1868 silver was discovered, and from 1870 to 1884 the mine at Silver Islet was the richest silver mine in the world.

== See also ==
- Black Bay Peninsula
