= Sleeping Giant (Ontario) =

Mountain in Ontario, Canada

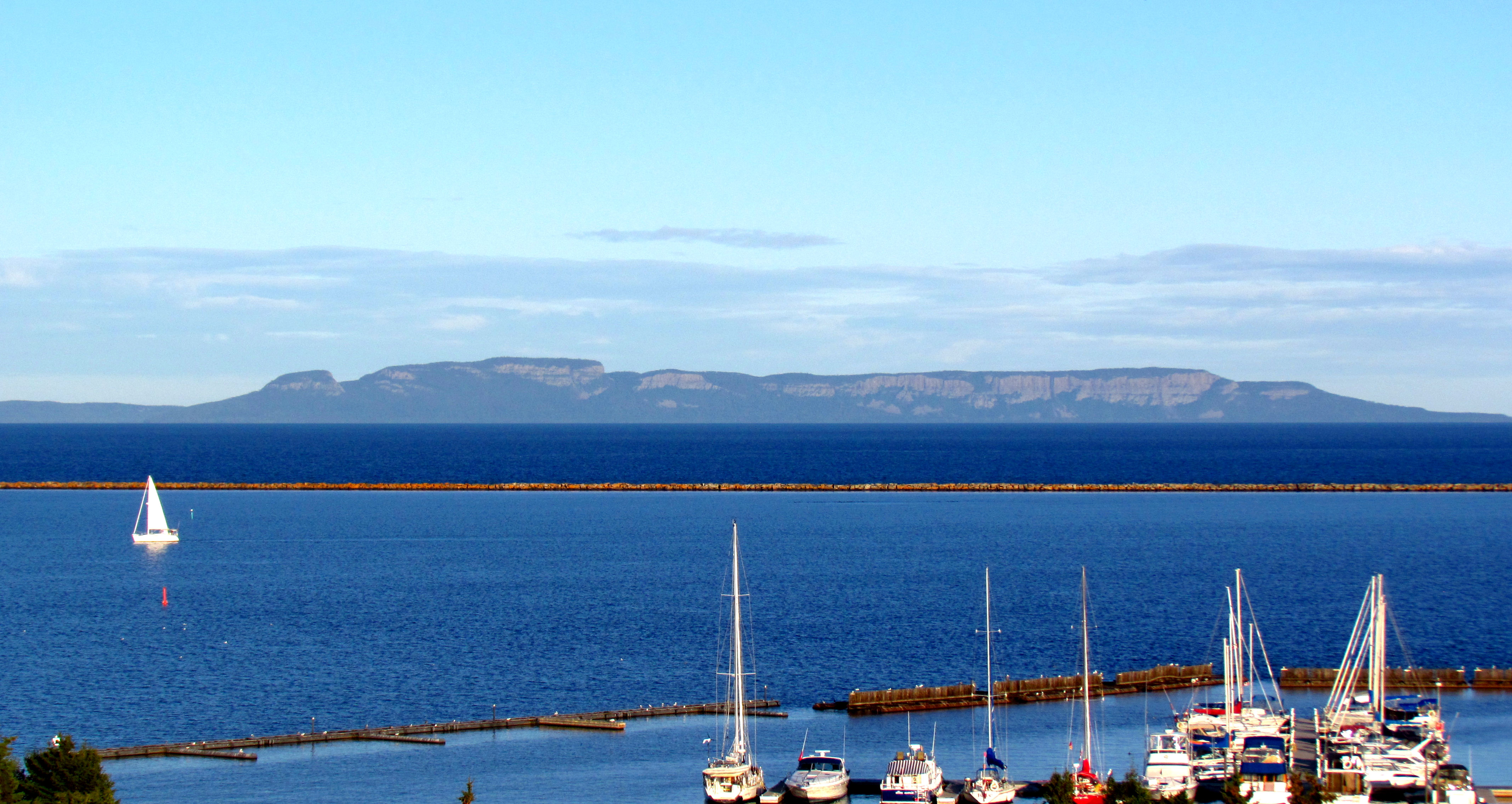
- View from Thunder Bay

Highest point
- Elevation: 563 m (1,847 ft)(Torso)
- Coordinates: 48°20′14″N 88°54′16″W

Geography
- Location: Thunder Bay District, Ontario
- Topo map: NTS 52A7 Thunder Cape

Geology
- Mountain type: Igneous rock

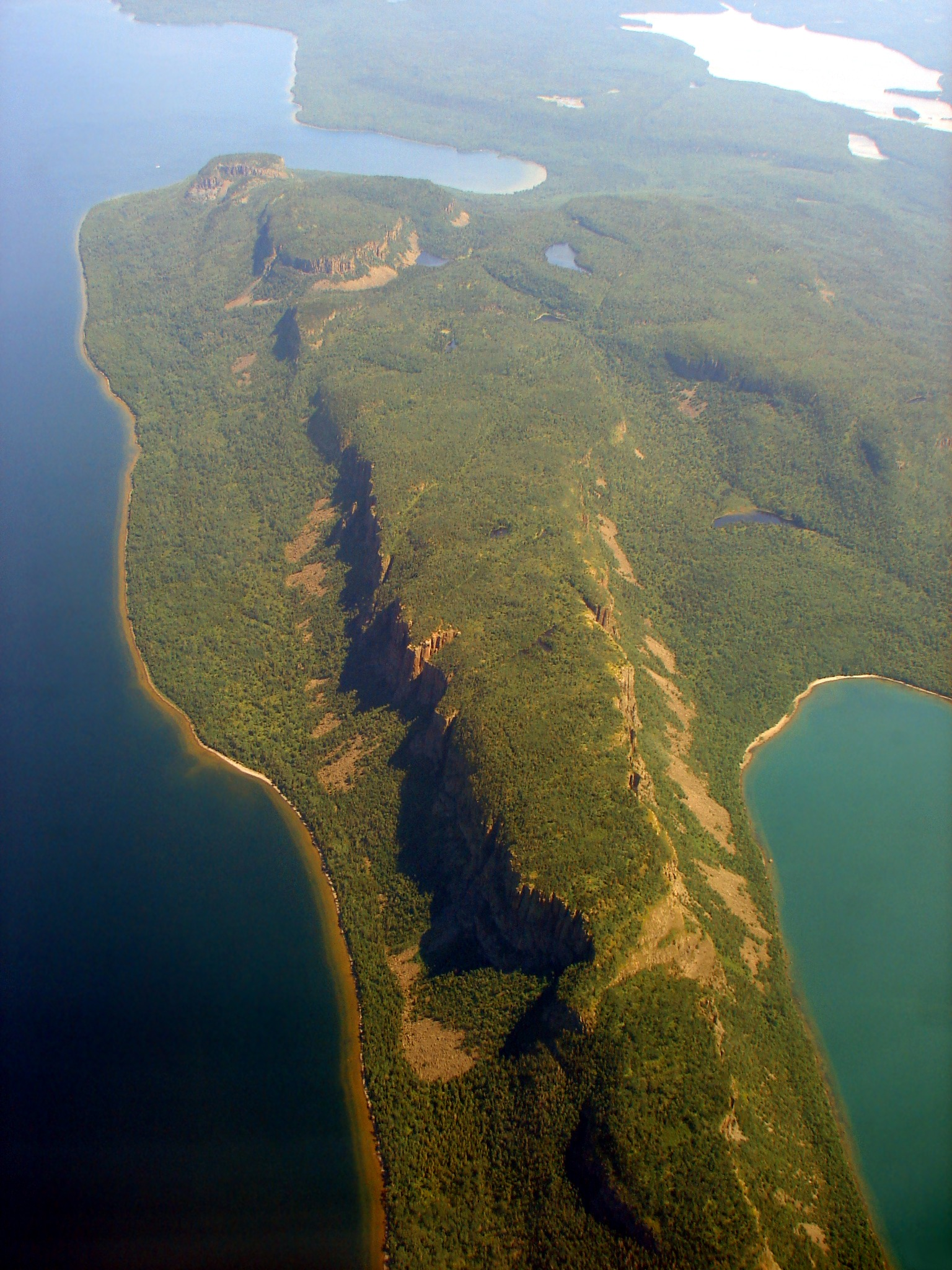
Aerial view of Sleeping Giant

The Sleeping Giant is a series of mesas formed by the erosion of thick, diabase sills on Sibley Peninsula that resembles a giant lying on its back when viewed from the west to north-northwest section of Thunder Bay, Ontario, Canada. As one moves southward along the shoreline toward Sawyer's Bay, the Sleeping Giant starts to separate into its various sections. Most distinctly in the view from the cliffs at Sawyer's Bay, the Giant appears to have an Adam's Apple. The formation is part of Sleeping Giant Provincial Park. Its dramatic steep cliffs are among the highest in Ontario (250 m). The southernmost point is known as Thunder Cape, depicted by many early Canadian artists such as William Armstrong.

One Ojibway legend identifies the giant as Nanabozho, who was turned to stone when the secret location of a rich silver mine now known as Silver Islet was disclosed to white men.

Sleeping Giant is the namesake and general setting of the 2015 Canadian film Sleeping Giant.

== Seven Wonders of Canada ==
It was voted number seven for a list of Seven Wonders of Canada, with a total of 177,305 votes, beating the Bay of Fundy and Niagara Falls by almost 90,000 votes.

== See also ==
- Nanabozho
- Mount Susitna
- Sibley Peninsula
- Silver Islet, Ontario
- Sleeping Giant Provincial Park
