= Caribou River (Rainy River District) =

- Location of the mouth of the Caribou River in Ontario

Location
- Country: Canada
- Province: Ontario
- Region: Northwestern Ontario
- District: Rainy River

Physical characteristics
- Source: Wilson Lake
  - coordinates: 49°01′17″N 91°09′56″W
  - elevation: 447 m (1,467 ft)
- Mouth: Marmion Lake
  - coordinates: 48°56′58″N 91°16′07″W
  - elevation: 415 m (1,362 ft)

Basin features
- River system: Hudson Bay drainage basin

The Caribou River is a river in the Unorganized Part of Rainy River District in Northwestern Ontario, Canada. The river is part of the Hudson Bay drainage basin. It runs from Wilson Lake to Upper Seine Bay on Marmion Lake. Marmion Lake flows via the Seine River, the Rainy River, the Winnipeg River and the Nelson River to Hudson Bay.

== Tributaries ==
- Bar Creek (right)

== Sources ==
- Map 13 (PDF) (Map). 1 : 1,600,000. Official road map of Ontario. Ministry of Transportation of Ontario. 2014.
- Restructured municipalities - Ontario map #1 (Map). Restructuring Maps of Ontario. Ontario Ministry of Municipal Affairs and Housing. 2006. Archived from the original on 2012-05-05.
