= Caribou River (Minnesota) =

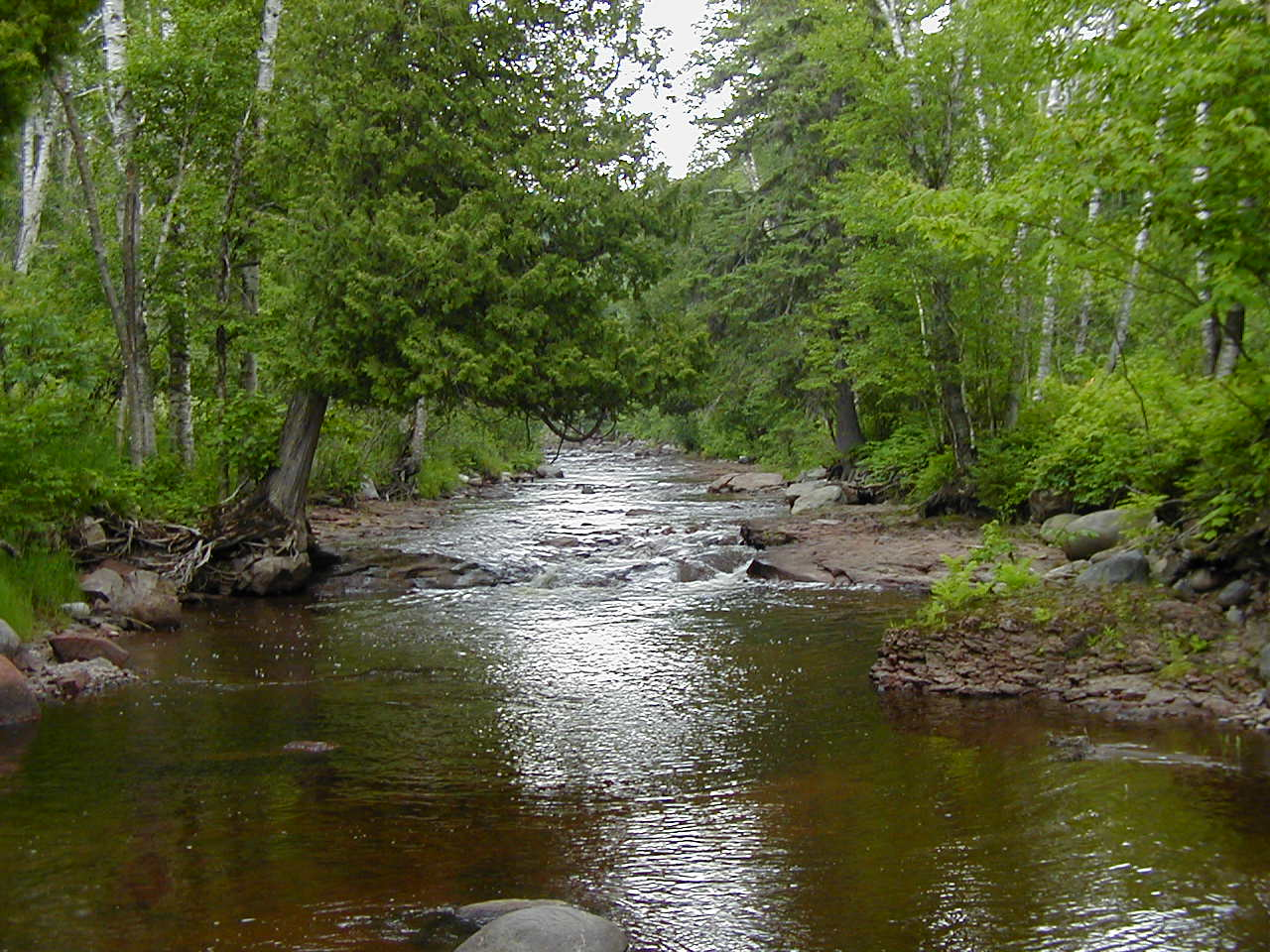
- Looking upstream from the Superior Hiking Trail

- Mouth of the Caribou River
- Native name: Adiko-ziibi (Ojibwe)

Location
- Country: United States
- State: Minnesota
- County: Lake County, Minnesota

Physical characteristics
- Source
  - location: Cramer
  - coordinates: 47.5882362°N 91.0243162°W
- Mouth: Lake Superior
  - coordinates: 47.461852°N 91.0287701°W
- Length: 15.0-mile-long (24.1 km)

Basin features
- River system: Lake Superior Drainage Basin
- Waterfalls: Caribou Falls

The Caribou River is a 15.0-mile-long (24.1 km) river in northern Minnesota, the United States. It rises in a swamp about .6 miles (1 km) south of Morris Lake and two miles (3.2 km) east of Echo Lake, near the Lake/Cook County line, at an altitude about 1620 feet (494 m) above sea level. It descends some 1,020 (311 m.) feet in elevation as it flows south to its mouth at Lake Superior, also near the eastern border of Lake County."Rivers of the North Shore". ojibwe.net.

== Habitat ==
The Caribou River is a designated trout stream with populations of brook and rainbow trout.

== See also ==
- List of rivers of Minnesota
