= Welcome Islands (Lake Superior) =

Island group in Ontario, Canada

- Interactive map of Welcome Islands

Geography
- Location: Lake Superior
- Coordinates: 48°22′02.4″N 89°07′13.9″W
- Archipelago: Welcome Islands
- Total islands: 4

Administration
- Canada
- Province: Ontario
- District: Thunder Bay

Demographics
- Population: 0

The Welcome Islands, Ontario are three islands in Lake Superior located within the southeast section of the Port of Thunder Bay about 6 nautical miles (11 km) offshore, opposite Mission Island, Thunder Bay and McKellar Island where the Kaministiquia River empties into Thunder Bay. They are sometimes referred to as the Three Sisters. The islands fall within the water boundaries of the city of Thunder Bay.

There are shoals nearby which ships must avoid. The Port Authority of Thunder Bay maintains a calling-in point for ships on the middle island.
