= Caribou, California =

Caribou
- Unincorporated Community; Census Designated Place
- Location of Caribou in Plumas County, California.

- Location in the United States
- Coordinates: 40°04′48″N 121°09′27″W
- Country: United States
- State: California
- County: Plumas

Area
  - Total: 0.16 sq mi (0.42 km^{2})
  - Land: 0.16 sq mi (0.42 km^{2})
  - Water: 0 sq mi (0.00 km^{2}) 0%
- Elevation: 3,287 ft (1,002 m)

Population (2020)
  - Total: 1
  - Density: 6.2/sq mi (2.38/km^{2})
- Time zone: UTC-8 (Pacific (PST))
  - Summer (DST): UTC-7 (PDT)
- ZIP code: 95915
- Area code: 530
- FIPS code: 06-11166
- GNIS feature IDs: 1658222; 2407962

Caribou (formerly Cariboo) is a census-designated place located in Plumas County, California, United States. As of the 2010 Census, the town had a population of 0, however, as of 2020, the population had risen to 1. Caribou is located on the North Fork Feather River, 9.5 miles (15.3 km) south of Almanor. The closest communities are Belden to the southwest, Twain to the southeast, Canyondam to the north, and Greenville to the east.

== History ==
The place started as a placer mining camp in 1850. The name honors an Indian miner named Johnny Caribou. The Caribou post office operated from 1922 to 1976.

== Geography ==
Caribou is located at 40°4'48" North, 121°9'27" West (40.079929, -121.157397).

According to the United States Census Bureau, the town has a total area of 0.2 square miles (0.52 km^{2}), all land.

== Demographics ==
Historical population
Census	Pop.	Note	%±
2000	0		—
2010	0		—
2020	1		—
U.S. Decennial Census; 1850–1870 1880-1890; 1900 1910 1920; 1930 1940 1950; 1960 1970 1980; 1990 2000 2010

Caribou first appeared as a census designated place in the 2000 U.S. census.

=== Racial and ethnic composition ===
Caribou CDP, California – Racial and ethnic composition Note: the US Census treats Hispanic/Latino as an ethnic category. This table excludes Latinos from the racial categories and assigns them to a separate category. Hispanics/Latinos may be of any race.
Race / Ethnicity (NH = Non-Hispanic)	Pop 2000	Pop 2010	Pop 2020	% 2000	% 2010	% 2020
White alone (NH)	0	0	0	0.00%	0.00%	0.00%
Black or African American alone (NH)	0	0	0	0.00%	0.00%	0.00%
Native American or Alaska Native alone (NH)	0	0	0	0.00%	0.00%	0.00%
Asian alone (NH)	0	0	0	0.00%	0.00%	0.00%
Native Hawaiian or Pacific Islander alone (NH)	0	0	0	0.00%	0.00%	0.00%
Other race alone (NH)	0	0	0	0.00%	0.00%	0.00%
Mixed race or Multiracial (NH)	0	0	0	0.00%	0.00%	0.00%
Hispanic or Latino (any race)	0	0	1	0.00%	0.00%	100.00%
Total	0	0	1	100.00%	100.00%	100.00%

=== 2020 census ===
As of the 2020 census, Caribou had a population of 1. The median age was 9.5 years. 100.0% of residents were under the age of 18 and 0.0% of residents were 65 years of age or older.

0.0% of residents lived in urban areas, while 100.0% lived in rural areas.

There were 0 households in Caribou. No households had children under the age of 18. There were no households headed by a single male or single female householder. There were no one-person households, including anyone living alone who was 65 years of age or older.

There was 1 housing unit, and all were vacant (100.0%). The homeowner vacancy rate was 0.0% and the rental vacancy rate was 0.0%.

=== 2010 census ===
As of the 2010 Census, there are no people living in the town. According to the US Census data, there are only two buildings in the community, both of them listed as "Vacant housing units" and "For seasonal, recreational, or occasional use".

== Education ==
The school district is Plumas Unified School District.
