= Dennis Franklin Cromarty High School =

Location
- 315 North Edward Street; Thunder Bay, Ontario, P7C 4P3; Canada; 48°23′21″N 89°16′45″W

Information
- School type: High school
- Founded: 2000
- School board: Northern Nishnawbe Education Council
- Principal: Sharon Angeconeb
- Grades: 9-12
- Colours: Red, White
- Mascot: Thunder Hawk
- Team name: DFC Thunder Hawks
- Rivals: St. Patrick High School; Westgate Collegiate & Vocational Institute; Hammarskjold High School; St. Ignatius High School
- Website: www.nnec.on.ca/index.php/dennis-franklin-cromarty-high-school/

Dennis Franklin Cromarty High School, also known as DFC High School, is a high school for Indigenous students located in Thunder Bay, Ontario, and is administered by the Northern Nishnawbe Education Council (NNEC). It was established in 2000 and serves 20 communities around Northwestern Ontario. Aboriginal students from around Northwestern Ontario attend DFC, often flying in from remote reserve communities.

== History ==
Northwood High School was constructed in 1963 and opened for the 1963–1964 school year. Northwood represented a new type of secondary school introduced in the 1960s known as “Special Vocational Schools.” In 1996, Northwood High School closed its doors due to economic reasons before being purchased by the Northern Nishnawbe Education Council and reopening as DFC High School in 2000.

== See also ==
- List of high schools in Ontario
- Education in Thunder Bay, Ontario
