= Fort William Collegiate Institute =

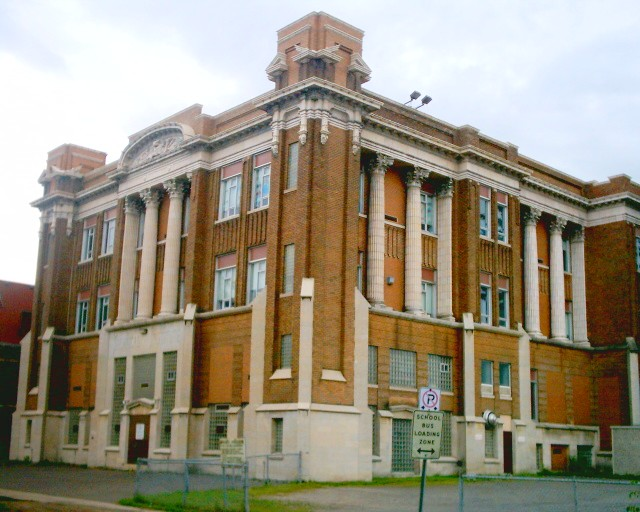

Location
- 512 Marks Street South; Thunder Bay, Ontario; Canada; 48°22′35″N 89°15′12″W

Information
- Type: High school
- Motto: Agimus Meliora
- Established: 1907
- Closed: 2005
- School district: Lakehead District School Board
- Grades: 9–12
- Language: English
- Colors: Blue and Gold
- Mascot: Blue Bear
- Team name: FW Blue Bears

Fort William Collegiate Institute (FWCI) was a collegiate institute operated by the Lakehead District School Board in Thunder Bay, Ontario from 1907 to 2005. The school's teams were called the "FWCI Blue Bears". The building was granted Historical Heritage Site status in 1983, and was designated a historic building on May 15, 1983.

== History and Architecture ==
The first building on the Marks Street site was the Fort William High school opened in September 1907, principal W.J. Hamilton. In May 1909 it was recognized by the Minister of Education as the Fort William Collegiate Institute. By 1919 it was apparent a new building was required. Architect R.E. Mason designed the building and the contractor was A.C. Stewart. Dr. Henry John Cody, Minister of Education, laid the cornerstone 28 May 1919. It was constructed in the Roman-Corinthian style, of Don Valley pressed brick, Manitoba Tyndall stone and architectural terracotta ornamentation. Tenders were called for a central unit in November 1924 and opened in December1925, which included a small gymnasium and auditorium. The old 1907 high school was demolished to make way for the new addition in February 1925. A large new gymnasium and renovations to the central unit were added in 1970 under principal H.M. Scollie.

Until 1931 the school conducted academic, commercial and technical classes, as the east wing built in 1925 had workshops. Vocational education moved to the Fort William Vocational Institute in 1931 on Selkirk Avenue.

In 1986, the Secondary School Board recommended that the Fort William Collegiate Institute be closed after the school year finished. The school would not end up closing as dominant groups in Thunder Bay were sending their children to the collegiate and their pressure, along with the mystique of the school, made its closure all but impossible. In 2005, due to high school enrollment decreasing throughout Thunder Bay, the Lakehead District School Board advised the school be closed. It was decided that two high schools in the South Ward, Westgate Collegiate & Vocational Institute and Sir Winston Churchill Collegiate & Vocational Institute, instead of three would be sufficient to handle the students. It was recommended that Fort William Collegiate Institute close due to the costly repairs and renovations it would require to function, and has been closed since the 2004–2005 school year. This school was considered in the community to be the school to attend if one had university aspirations, with phenomenal teaching staff. It was the only high school in Fort William without shop or technical level classes after 1931. In a city where the majority identified as blue collar, this school distinguished itself as being the school to teach the future leaders of the community.

== School Motto and Year Book ==
The school motto was "Agimus Meliora" - We strive for better things. An appropriate motto for a school where Latin was taught throughout its history.

The school year book was known as The Oracle, copies of which may be found at the Thunder Bay Historical Museum Society.

== See also ==
- Education in Thunder Bay, Ontario
