= Busniuk =

Busniuk is a surname. Notable people with the surname include:

- Mike Busniuk (born 1951), Canadian ice hockey player and coach
- Ron Busniuk (1948–2024), Canadian ice hockey player
