= Education in Thunder Bay, Ontario =

School system in Canadian city

Thunder Bay has 38 elementary schools, 3 middle schools, 5 secondary schools, 2 private schools, a university, two colleges, a medical school, and an adult education facility. The school boards offer education programmes for people with special needs or who are in trouble with the law, as well as night school. The city also has several other private for-profit colleges and tutoring programmes.

== School boards ==
The main school boards serving the Thunder Bay area are the Lakehead District School Board, the Thunder Bay Catholic District School Board, the Conseil scolaire de district catholique des Aurores boréales and Conseil scolaire du Grand Nord.

The Lakehead District School Board is the largest, with 22 elementary schools, 3 secondary schools and a centre for adult studies. The Thunder Bay Catholic District School Board is the second largest with 16 elementary schools, 3 middle schools and 2 high schools. CSDC Aurores boréales operates one elementary and one high school in Thunder Bay, and an additional six schools throughout the Thunder Bay District. Conseil scolaire du Grand Nord operates one public French-language elementary school in Thunder Bay, and additional schools throughout Northern Ontario.

=== List of Schools ===
Public Elementary Schools

- Algonquin Avenue Public School
- Armstrong Public School (Armstrong)
- Bernier-Stokes Public School (Collins)
- C.D. Howe Public School
- Claude E. Garton Public School (French Immersion)
- Crestview Public School (Murillo)
- École Elsie MacGill Public School
- École Gron Morgan Public School (French Immersion)
- Five Mile Public School
- Gorham and Ware Community School (Gorham and Ware)
- Kakabeka Falls Public School (Kakabeka Falls)
- Kingsway Park Public School
- McKellar Park Public School
- McKenzie Public School (Shuniah) (K-6)
- Nor'wester View Public School
- Ogden Community School
- St. James Public School
- Sherbrooke Public School
- Valley Central Public School
- Vance Chapman Public School
- Westmount Public School
- Whitefish Valley Public School (Whitefish Valley)
- Woodcrest Public School

Public Secondary Schools

- Hammarskjold High School (French Immersion)
- Superior Collegiate and Vocational Institute (IB)
- Westgate Collegiate & Vocational Institute

Adult Education

- Lakehead Adult Education Centre

Catholic K-6 Schools

- Corpus Christi
- Holy Cross
- Holy Family
- Our Lady Of Charity
- St. Ann
- St. Bernard (French Immersion)
- St. Elizabeth
- St. Francis
- St. Jude
- St. Margaret
- St. Martin
- St. Paul
- St. Pius X
- St. Thomas Aquinas
- St. Vincent

Catholic 7/8 Schools

- Bishop E. Q. Jennings
- Bishop Gallagher
- Pope John Paul II

Catholic Secondary Schools

- St. Ignatius (French Immersion)
- St. Patrick (French Immersion)

CSDC Aurores Boréales

- École Catholique Franco-Supérior (K-6)
- École secondaire catholique de la Vérendrye (7 to 12)

Conseil scolaire du Grand Nord

- École publique des Vents du Nord

Private Schools

- Dennis Franklin Cromarty High School (Official Site)(9 to 12)
- Thunder Bay Christian School (Official Site)(K-10)(CSI)

=== Post-Secondary Institutions ===
- Confederation College
- Aviation Centre of Excellence
- Negahneewin College
- Lakehead University
- Northern Ontario School of Medicine

=== For-Profit Institutions ===
- Everest College (closed)
- Kumon Canada
- Sylvan Learning Centre

== See also ==
- List of school districts in Ontario
- List of high schools in Ontario
