= Hillcrest High School (Thunder Bay) =

Former high school in Thunder Bay, Ontario

Coordinates: 48°26′28″N 89°13′54″W

Location
- 94 North High Street; Thunder Bay, Ontario, P7A 5R3; Canada

Information
- Type: High school
- Established: 1928 as Port Arthur Technical School
- Closed: 2009
- School district: Lakehead District School Board
- Grades: 9-12
- Language: English
- Colours: Green, Yellow and White
- Mascot: Colt
- Team name: Hillcrest Colts
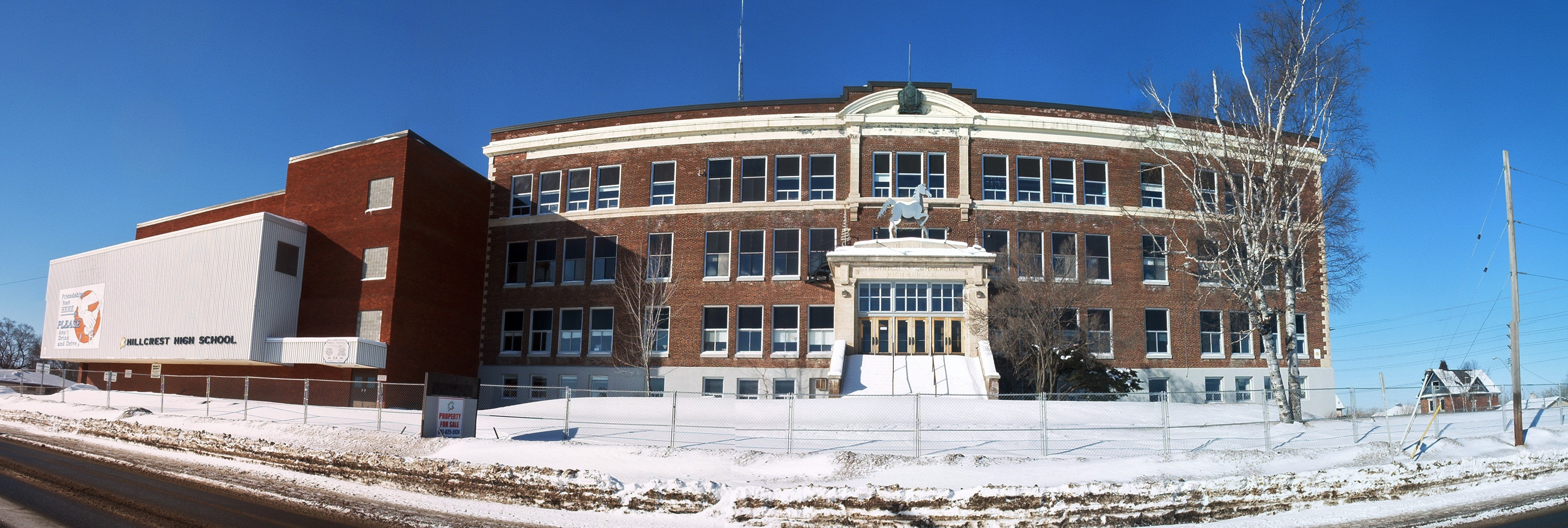

Hillcrest High School was a high school in Thunder Bay, Ontario. It is part of the Lakehead District School Board system. The school was opened in 1928 as Port Arthur Technical School, and expanded several times in its history. The school's teams were named "Hillcrest Colts".

== History ==
The school was designed by C.D. Howe & Co. The first principal was W.A. McWilliams. The first classes were held January 7, 1929.

In 2007, students from Port Arthur Collegiate Institute were relocated to Hillcrest High School when their school closed. In the fall of 2009 Hillcrest closed and the student body was relocated to the new Superior Collegiate and Vocational Institute.

Following its 2009 closure, Hillcrest High School was purchased by a private developer, Robert Zanette. In 2011, it was transformed into a collaborative environment of non-profit and for profit businesses, as the Thunder Bay Centre of Change. As of 2014, with less than half of the space rented and a new co-owner, it was announced that the building would be converted to housing, though it was uncertain at that time whether the conversion would be to rental apartments or condominiums. In 2015, Thunder Bay city council approved Robert Zanette's application to convert of the building to condominiums.

== Notable alumni ==
- Lauri Conger, member of the music group The Parachute Club.
- Fred Page, inductee of the Hockey Hall of Fame.

== See also ==
- Education in Thunder Bay, Ontario
