= École secondaire catholique de la Vérendrye =

Location
- 175 High Street North; Thunder Bay, Ontario, P7A 8C7; Canada

Information
- School type: High school
- Motto: Ensemble, bâtissons notre avenir (Let's build our future together)
- Founded: 2004
- School board: Conseil scolaire de district catholique des Aurores boréales
- Principal: Marie-France Tousignant
- Grades: 7-12
- Language: French
- Colours: Blue and Grey
- Mascot: Viper
- Rivals: Superior Collegiate and Vocational Institute; Hammarskjold High School; St. Ignatius High School

École secondaire catholique de la Vérendrye (ESCDLV) is a French Catholic high school located in Port Arthur, Thunder Bay, Ontario. It is part of the Conseil scolaire de district catholique des Aurores boréales, a French Catholic school board serving Northwestern Ontario. The school opened in 2004 on the site of the former Prospect Avenue Public School. The construction of the French language high school faced opposition from Thunder Bay's Anglophone majority. The school is named after Pierre Gaultier de Varennes, sieur de La Vérendrye, a French explorer. There is a total of 37 employees at La Vérendrye as of January 2009.

== Sports ==
La Vérendrye has the highest athlete/student ratio of high schools in Thunder Bay. The school has won 6 volleyball championships and 5 volleyball tournaments since 2004, and for the first time on November 21, 2008, the senior boys' volleyball team beat Atikokan in the NWOSSAA "A" championships, bringing them into provincials (OFSAA) where they finished 12th in Ontario for "A". Teams from La Vérendrye also participate in golf, curling, basketball and running.

OFSAA A Volleyball Ranking
2004 - Did not qualify
2005 - Did not qualify
2006 - No Team
2007 - Did not qualify
2008 - 12th
2009 - 9th

== See also ==
- Education in Ontario
- List of secondary schools in Ontario
- Education in Thunder Bay, Ontario
