= General Agnew =

General Agnew may refer to:

- Donald Agnew (1897–1968), Canadian Army brigadier general
- James Agnew (British Army officer) (1719–1777), British Army brigadier general
- Sir Andrew Agnew, 5th Baronet (1687–1771), British Army lieutenant general
