= FWCI =

FWCI may refer to:

- Fort William Collegiate Institute
- Field-weighted Citation Impact, an author-level metric used by Scopus SciVal
- Flat Water Canoe Instructor from Cadet Instructors Cadre
