= Hammarskjold High School =

Location
- 80 South Clarkson Street; Thunder Bay, Ontario, P7B 4W8; Canada; 48°26′35″N 89°15′03″W

Information
- School type: High school
- Motto: Facta Non Verba (Latin: Deeds not Words)
- Founded: 1962
- School board: Lakehead Public Schools
- Principal: Derek Di Blasio
- Faculty: 65
- Grades: 9-12
- Enrollment: 850 (2019-20)
- Language: English, French
- Campus: Suburban
- Campus size: 17.3 Acres
- Colours: Red, Gold
- Athletics conference: Superior Secondary Schools Athletic Association (SSSAA)
- Sports: Football, basketball, volleyball, track & field, biking, soccer
- Mascot: Viking
- Team name: Hammarskjold Vikings
- Rivals: St. Patrick High School; Westgate Collegiate & Vocational Institute; St. Ignatius High School; Superior Collegiate and Vocational Institute
- Publication: Hammar & Shield
- Website: hammarskjold.lakeheadschools.ca

Hammarskjold High School is a public high school located in Thunder Bay, Ontario, Canada, with an enrollment of roughly 850 students. It is named after Swedish diplomat Dag Hammarskjöld. The principal of Hammarskjold High School is Derek Di Blasio.

== History ==
Hammarskjold High School was constructed in 1962 in response to rapidly increasing enrollment at the former City of Port Arthur's other public high schools (Port Arthur Collegiate Institute, Hillcrest High School, and Lakeview High School). The school was given its name through a student referendum.

Hammarskjold accepted students in fall 1962 with only the two story classroom wing completed. The first student assembly at Christmas had male students sitting on the gym floor while the girls sat on the steel chairs, as the bleachers were not completed yet. The official opening was on May 22, 1963.

Hammarskjold High School has undergone numerous renovations and expansions throughout its history. The most recent expansion, in the early 1990s, saw the addition of a library and music room in the school's former technology wing. Several technology classrooms have been converted to academic classrooms along with the school's increasing emphasis on academics over vocations.

In terms of athletics they have one of the city's most successful football programs, recently winning the 2023 SSSAA Football Championship.

== Academic programs ==
Hammarskjold offers a curriculum that includes Advanced Placement, French immersion, vocational, and college preparation courses.

=== French Immersion Program ===
Hammarskjold High School is the only secondary school within the Lakehead District School Board that offers the French immersion program. The four year program includes classes in geography, physical education, civics and careers, Canadian history, food and nutrition, cooperative education, food and culture, and anthropology. Hammarskjold High School is one of the Diplôme d'études en langue française (DELF) accredited evaluation centres in the city where grade 12 French immersion, or grade 12 core French students can take the internationally-recognized language examination. Often, core French students from Westgate Collegiate & Vocational Institute and Superior Collegiate and Vocational Institute travel to Hammarskjold to write the DELF examination each school year.

== Feeder Schools ==
The following elementary schools feed into Hammarskjold High School:

- Agnew H. Johnston Public School (FI)
- Algonquin Avenue Public School
- C.D. Howe Public School
- Claude E. Garton Public School (FI)
- École Gron Morgan Public School
- Woodcrest Public School

== See also ==
- Education in Ontario
- List of secondary schools in Ontario
- Education in Thunder Bay, Ontario
