= Mike Busniuk =

Canadian ice hockey player, coach (b. 1951)

- Born: December 13, 1951 (age 74) Thunder Bay, Ontario, Canada
- Height: 6 ft 3 in (191 cm)
- Weight: 200 lb (91 kg; 14 st 4 lb)
- Position: Defence
- Shot: Right
- Played for: Philadelphia Flyers
- NHL draft: 67th overall, 1971; Montreal Canadiens
- Playing career: 1974–1984

Michael Busniuk (born December 13, 1951) is a Canadian former professional ice hockey player and coach. He is the younger brother of Ron Busniuk. Busniuk was selected 67th overall, in the 5th round of the 1971 NHL Amateur Draft, by the Montreal Canadiens and played two seasons with the Philadelphia Flyers. Busniuk played eight seasons in the American Hockey League and is the only player to be a member of four consecutive Calder Cup championship teams (1976–1979), and to win five cups as a player. Busniuk won a sixth Calder Cup as a coach.

Busniuk was born in Thunder Bay, Ontario.

== Playing career ==
Busniuk played junior ice hockey with the Fort William Canadians. During his third and final year, in 1970-71, Busniuk was picked up as an add-on player by the Fort William Hurricanes who had advanced to the 1970 Memorial Cup. In 12 games, he scored twice and had four points. Busniuk played collegiate hockey with the University of Denver Pioneers while earning a teaching certificate in physical education. Busniuk was named team captain in the 1973–74 season. The Pioneers made the Final Four three of the four years he attended the school.

After graduating, Busniuk’s professional hockey career began with being assigned to the Montreal Canadien's AHL farm team, the Nova Scotia Voyageurs for the 1974–75 season. Busniuk played with the Beauce Jaros of the NAHL for the 1975–76 season. The Jaros were the top team in the league in the regular season, but lost in the Lockhart Cup finals. After the NAHL playoffs completed, Busniuk played in one playoff game with the Nova Scotia Voyageurs winning the 1976 Calder Cup. Busniuk and the Voyageurs repeated as Calder Cup champions in 1977.

October 23, 1977 Busniuk signed as a free agent by Philadelphia and was assigned to the Maine Mariners in the AHL. The Mariners were Calder cup champions in 1978 and 1979, and Busniuk became the only person to play on four consecutive Calder Cup winning teams. Three games into the 1979–80 season, Busniuk was called up from the Mariners to the NHL's Philadelphia Flyers. Busniuk helped the Flyers reach the 1980 Stanley Cup Finals Final, where they lost in six games to the New York Islanders. Busniuk played for the Flyers for two seasons between 1979 and 1981. In his NHL career, he finished with three goals and 23 assists in 143 games, to go with 297 penalty minutes.

Busniuk returned to the Maine Mariners for the 1981–82 season. He would split the next three seasons playing in the AHL and in Europe with HC Brunico in the Italian Serie A league. Busniuk won a fifth Calder Cup playing with the Mariners in the 1983–84 season. Busniuk won the Calder Cup five times during his playing career to share the record for most Calder Cups won with Bob Solinger, Les Duff, and Fred Glover.

== Coaching career ==
Busniuk began his coaching career as head coach of the Tri-City Americans in the 1991–92 WHL season. He was hired as an assistant coach for the New York Rangers' AHL team Binghamton Rangers. Busniuk remained in Binghamton four seasons, and stayed with the team when it relocated to become the Hartford Wolf Pack for another five seasons. In 2000, as an assistant with the Hartford Wolf Pack, Busniuk won a sixth Calder Cup. Busniuk served as head coach of the United Hockey League's Muskegon Fury in 2002-03, where he posted a 38-29-9 record. Busniuk returned to Binghamton to serve as an assistant coach with the Ottawa Senators' AHL team, the Binghamton Senators of the American Hockey League from 2003 to 2010.

Busniuk then returned home to Thunder Bay, where he served in a similar capacity with the Lakehead Thunderwolves, eventually filling in as an interim coach after Joel Scherban was fired four games into the 2012-13 season. He also taught at Dennis Franklin Cromarty High School, an all First Nations school in Thunder Bay.

In 2013 Busniuk returned to Brunico, Italy to be head coach of HC Pustertal Wölfe, the same city he played for from 1982-1985.

== Statistics ==
			Regular season					Playoffs
Season	Team	League	GP	G	A	Pts	PIM	GP	G	A	Pts	PIM
1967–68	Fort William Canadians	TBJHL	24	11	11	22	27	––	––	––	––	––
1968–69	Fort William Canadians	TBJHL	––	––	––	––	––	13	3	6	9	10
1969–70	Fort William Canadians	TBJHL	––	––	––	––	––	––	––	––	––	––
1969–70	Fort William Hurricanes	TBJHL	––	––	––	––	––	12	2	2	4	25
1970–71	U. of Denver	WCHA	36	1	10	11	46	––	––	––	––	––
1971–72	U. of Denver	WCHA	38	1	19	20	77	––	––	––	––	––
1972–73	U. of Denver	WCHA	39	20	17	37	70	––	––	––	––	––
1973–74	U. of Denver	WCHA	32	18	22	40	34	––	––	––	––	––
1974–75	Nova Scotia Voyageurs	AHL	69	15	17	32	94	6	1	0	1	2
1975–76	Beauce Jaros	NAHL	65	14	52	66	179	14	1	12	13	61
1975–76	Nova Scotia Voyageurs	AHL	––	––	––	––	––	1	0	0	0	4
1976–77	Nova Scotia Voyageurs	AHL	80	1	15	16	160	12	0	0	0	4
1977–78	Maine Mariners	AHL	75	5	15	20	72	12	0	1	1	44
1978–79	Maine Mariners	AHL	79	10	35	45	215	10	0	5	5	4
1979–80	Maine Mariners	AHL	3	2	1	3	7	––	––	––	––	––
1979–80	Philadelphia Flyers	NHL	71	2	18	20	93	19	2	4	6	23
1980–81	Philadelphia Flyers	NHL	72	1	5	6	204	6	0	1	1	11
1981–82	Maine Mariners	AHL	78	12	26	38	203	4	1	0	1	20
1982–83	HC Brunico	Serie A	29	16	33	49	43	10	9	12	21	18
1982–83	Maine Mariners	AHL	11	0	5	5	14	17	1	5	6	52
1983–84	HC Brunico	Serie A	27	16	30	46	28	7	3	5	8	6
1983–84	Maine Mariners	AHL	2	0	1	1	2	16	1	1	2	105
1984–85	HC Brunico	Serie A	26	9	16	25	29	6	4	4	8	14
1985–86	Thunder Bay Twins	Sr. A	––	––	––	––	––	––	––	––	––	––
1986–87	Thunder Bay Twins	Sr. A	8	0	3	3	36	––	––	––	––	––
NHL totals			143	3	23	26	297	25	2	5	7	34
AHL totals			397	45	114	159	767	78	4	12	16	235
Serie A totals			82	41	79	120	100	23	16	21	37	38

== Coaching record ==
Team	Year	League	Regular Season								Post Season
Team	Year	League	G	W	L	T	OTW	OTL	Pts	Finish	Result
Tri-City Americans	1991-92	WHL	72	35	35	2	––	––	72	3rd in West	Lost in round 1
Muskegon Fury	2002–03	UHL	76	38	29	9	––	––	85	3rd in Western	Lost in round 2
Lakehead Thunderwolves	2012–13	OUA	––	––	––	––	––	––	––	––	Lost in round 1
HC Pustertal Wölfe	2013–14	Elite A	42	23	14	––	1	4	75	3rd in league	Lost in finals
