= Thunder Bay Catholic District School Board =

School board

Location
- 459 Victoria Ave W. Thunder Bay, Ontario; P7C 0A4 Thunder Bay, Ontario Canada
- Coordinates: 48.3845°N 89.2876°W

District information
- Superintendent: Sheila Chiodo; JP Tennier; Omer Belisle; Allison Sargent
- Chair of the board: Francis Veneruz
- Director of education: Pino Tassone
- Schools: 20: 15 elementary, 3 senior elementary, 2 secondary
- District ID: B29068

Students and staff
- Students: 8,132 2013

Other information
- Elected trustees: Dina McFarlane; Eleanor Ashe; Francis Veneruz; Kathy O'Brien; Lawrence Badanai; Loretta Fonso; Philip Pelletier
- Website: www.tbcdsb.on.ca

The Thunder Bay Catholic District School Board (known as English-language Separate District School Board No. 34A prior to 1999) oversees all Catholic schools in the Thunder Bay CMA and the townships of Gorham and Ware in Ontario, Canada. It administers education at 15 elementary schools, 3 senior elementary, and 2 secondary schools.

K-6 Schools

- Corpus Christi
- Holy Cross
- Holy Family
- Our Lady Of Charity
- St. Ann
- St. Bernard (French Immersion)
- St. Elizabeth
- St. Francis
- St. Jude
- St. Margaret
- St. Martin (French Immersion)
- St. Paul
- St. Pius X
- St. Thomas Aquinas
- St. Vincent

7/8 Schools

- Bishop E. Q. Jennings
- Bishop Gallagher (French Immersion)
- Pope John Paul II (French Immersion)

High Schools

- St. Ignatius (French Immersion)
- St. Patrick (French Immersion)

== See also ==
- Education in Thunder Bay, Ontario
- Lakehead District School Board
- Conseil scolaire de district catholique des Aurores boréales
- List of school districts in Ontario
- List of high schools in Ontario
