= Les Duff =

Canadian ice hockey player (1934–2025)

- Born: December 12, 1934 Kirkland Lake, Ontario, Canada
- Died: 2025 (aged 90)
- Height: 5 ft 10 in (178 cm)
- Weight: 165 lb (75 kg; 11 st 11 lb)
- Position: Left wing
- Shot: Left
- Played for: WHL; Winnipeg Warriors; Vancouver Canucks; AHL; Pittsburgh Hornets; Hershey Bears; Rochester Americans; CPHL; Tulsa Oilers
- Playing career: 1955–1970

Les Duff (December 12, 1934 – 2025) was a Canadian professional ice hockey player. Between 1955 and 1970 he played 927 games in the American Hockey League (AHL).

Duff won the Calder Cup five times during his playing career to share the record for most Calder Cups won with Bob Solinger, Fred Glover, and Mike Busniuk.

Following his playing career, Duff worked 23 years with the Toronto Transit Commission before retiring. His brother is Hockey Hall of Famer Dick Duff.

On November 5, 2025, it was announced that Duff had died at the age of 90.
