= Conseil scolaire de district catholique des Aurores boréales =

Conseil scolaire de district catholique des Aurores boréales Aurora Borealis Catholic District School Board

Location
- 175, rue High nord Thunder Bay, Ontario Thunder Bay District, Ontario Canada
- Coordinates: 48°26′38″N 89°13′42″W

District information
- Director of education: Sylvianne Mauro
- Schools: 9: 9 elementary and 1 secondary
- Budget: CA$12,520,316 million (2005)
- District ID: B29130

Students and staff
- Students: 657 (2005)

Other information
- Elected trustees: Debbie Coughlin; Claudette Gleeson; Mariette Langevin; Réal Deschatelets; Elodie Grunerud; Maguy Lorek; Francine Marcotte-Roy; Micheline Lovenuk; Sylvie Payeur; Donald Pelletier; Jean-Pierre Pelletier; Student Trustee: Mariane Trottier
- Website: www.csdcab.on.ca

The Conseil scolaire de district catholique des Aurores boréales oversees 10 French language Catholic schools in Thunder Bay District, Ontario, Canada. It administers education at nine elementary schools, and one secondary school.

== Elementary schools ==
- École catholique Franco-Supérieur (Thunder Bay)
- École catholique des Étoiles-du-Nord (Red Lake, Ontario)
- École catholique de l'Enfant-Jésus (Dryden)
- École Immaculée-Conception (Ignace)
- École catholique Franco-Terrace (Terrace Bay)
- École catholique Val-des-Bois (Marathon)
- École Notre-Dame-de-Fatima (Longlac)
- École St-Joseph (Geraldton)
- Notre Dame des Écoles (Nakina)

== Secondary schools ==
- École secondaire catholique de la Vérendrye (Thunder Bay)

== See also ==
- Education in Thunder Bay, Ontario
- Lakehead District School Board
- Thunder Bay Catholic District School Board
- List of school districts in Ontario
- List of high schools in Ontario
