= St. Patrick High School (Thunder Bay) =

Location
- 621 South Selkirk Street; Thunder Bay, Ontario, P7E 1T9; Canada; 48°22′30″N 89°15′36″W

Information
- School type: High school
- Motto: Fide Et Labore Valebo (Through Faith and Hard Work I shall succeed)
- School board: Thunder Bay Catholic District School Board
- Principal: Don Grant
- Grades: 9-12
- Language: English
- Colours: Green and Gold
- Mascot: Fighting saint (Saint)
- Rivals: Hammarskjold High School; Westgate Collegiate & Vocational Institute; Superior Collegiate and Vocational Institute; St. Ignatius High School
- Website: tbcschools.ca/st-patrick

St. Patrick High School is a Catholic high school located in the south end of Thunder Bay, Ontario. It is part of the Thunder Bay Catholic District School Board, and its amenities include a chapel, custom-built music rooms, newly renovated auditorium (as of 2010), two gyms, a fully functional cafeteria, and wheelchair accessibility. The schools offers French Immersion and Advanced Placement programs. Unlike schools in the public system, students at St. Patrick are required to wear uniforms.

== History ==
Fort William Vocational Collegiate Institute was constructed in 1931 and later changed its name to Selkirk Collegiate & Vocational Institute in 1957. In 1988 it was bought by the Thunder Bay Catholic District School Board to replace Sacred Heart High School, and its name changed to St. Patrick High School. It is currently located in the building formerly occupied by Selkirk High School of the Lakehead District School Board system.

Saint Patrick is one of the two high schools to have uniforms in Thunder Bay.

== Athletics ==
Its varsity team is the St. Patrick Saints. The school has a very strong badminton program.

== See also ==
- Education in Ontario
- List of secondary schools in Ontario
- Education in Thunder Bay, Ontario
