= Superior Collegiate and Vocational Institute =

Location
- 333 North High Street; Thunder Bay, Ontario, P7A 5S3; Canada; 48°26′58″N 89°13′39″W

Information
- School type: High school
- Founded: 2009
- School board: Lakehead Public Schools
- Principal: Neil Workman
- Grades: 9–12
- Language: English
- Colours: Columbia Blue, Black & White
- Mascot: The Gryphon
- Rivals: Hammarskjold High School; École secondaire catholique de la Vérendrye; St. Ignatius High School
- Website: superior.lakeheadschools.ca

Superior Collegiate and Vocational Institute (SCVI) is a high school in Thunder Bay, Ontario and is part of the Lakehead District School Board system. The school opened in September 2009. It has approximately 650 students. It is also currently, as of September 2019, the only school in the Lakehead District School Board that offers the International Baccalaureate program, introduced in September 2018 after the shut down of Sir Winston Churchill Collegiate & Vocational Institute.

== History ==
Superior Collegiate and Vocational Institute replaced Port Arthur Collegiate Institute and Hillcrest High School. Port Arthur Collegiate opened in 1909 and closed in 2007. Its students were then transferred to Hillcrest High School, which opened in 1928 as "Port Arthur Technical School". Hillcrest High School closed in 2009.

Construction of the school began in 2007. It was built on the former site of Balsam Street Public School, about a kilometre north of Hillcrest High School.

== See also ==
- Education in Ontario
- List of secondary schools in Ontario
- Education in Thunder Bay, Ontario
