= Bob Solinger =

Canadian ice hockey player

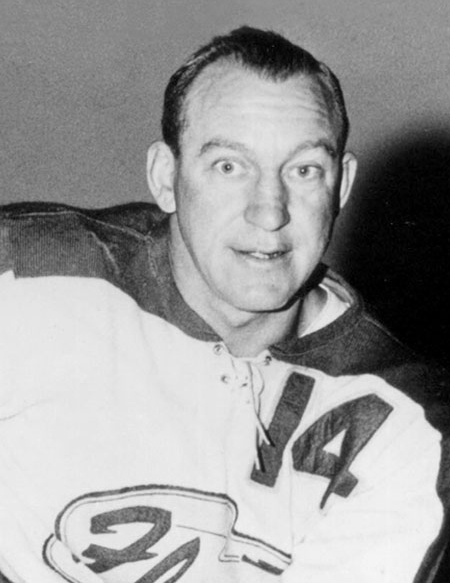
- with the Edmonton Flyers, c. 1946
- Born: December 23, 1925 Star City, Saskatchewan, Canada
- Died: December 10, 2014 (aged 88) Edmonton, Alberta, Canada
- Height: 5 ft 9 in (175 cm)
- Weight: 170 lb (77 kg; 12 st 2 lb)
- Position: Left wing
- Shot: Left
- Played for: Toronto Maple Leafs; Detroit Red Wings
- Playing career: 1944–1969

Robert Edward "Solly" Solinger (December 23, 1925 – December 10, 2014) was a professional ice hockey player who played 99 games in the National Hockey League. Born in Star City, Saskatchewan, he played for the Toronto Maple Leafs and Detroit Red Wings. He was the first winner of the Dudley "Red" Garrett Memorial Award as rookie of the year in the American Hockey League.

Solinger won the Calder Cup five times during his playing career to share the record for most Calder Cups won with Les Duff, Fred Glover, and Mike Busniuk. He died on December 10, 2014.

== Career statistics ==
=== Regular season and playoffs ===
			Regular season					Playoffs
Season	Team	League	GP	G	A	Pts	PIM	GP	G	A	Pts	PIM
1944–45	Prince Albert Black Hawks	SJHL	12	14	3	17	6	5	7	5	12	6
1944–45	Prince Albert Black Hawks	M-Cup	—	—	—	—	—	3	0	1	1	12
1945–46	Cleveland Barons	AHL	1	0	0	0	0	—	—	—	—	—
1945–46	Philadelphia Falcons	EAHL	44	10	9	19	50	12	5	3	8	11
1946–47	Minneapolis Millers	USHL	2	0	0	0	0	—	—	—	—	—
1946–47	Edmonton Flyers	WCSHL	38	11	16	27	72	4	4	3	7	10
1947–48	Celeveland Barons	AHL	67	40	29	69	41	9	7	6	13	0
1948–49	Cleveland Barons	AHL	68	16	31	47	29	5	3	3	6	4
1949–50	Pittsburgh Hornets	AHL	44	10	17	27	34	—	—	—	—	—
1950–51	Pittsburgh Hornets	AHL	69	22	32	54	34	13	10	6	16	4
1951–52	Toronto Maple Leafs	NHL	24	5	3	8	4	—	—	—	—	—
1951–52	Pittsburgh Hornets	AHL	44	23	20	43	24	11	3	6	9	4
1952–53	Toronto Maple Leafs	NHL	18	1	1	2	2	—	—	—	—	—
1952–53	Pittsburgh Hornets	AHL	42	26	30	56	51	10	4	5	9	24
1953–54	Toronto Maple Leafs	NHL	39	3	2	5	2	—	—	—	—	—
1953–54	Pittsburgh Hornets	AHL	22	10	19	29	4	5	1	1	2	12
1954–55	Toronto Maple Leafs	NHL	17	1	5	6	11	—	—	—	—	—
1954–55	Pittsburgh Hornets	AHL	46	12	24	36	36	10	6	7	13	6
1955–56	Pittsburgh Hornets	AHL	63	27	46	73	74	4	0	3	3	0
1956–57	Hershey Bears	AHL	61	19	30	49	16	7	1	1	2	11
1957–58	Hershey Bears	AHL	66	16	32	48	28	11	1	8	9	4
1958–59	Hershey Bears	AHL	69	12	24	36	46	12	3	7	10	23
1959–60	Detroit Red Wings	NHL	1	0	0	0	0	—	—	—	—	—
1959–60	Hershey Bears	AHL	45	8	15	23	18	—	—	—	—	—
1959–60	Edmonton Flyers	WHL	21	10	9	19	14	4	0	1	1	0
1960–61	Edmonton Flyers	WHL	67	23	19	42	10	—	—	—	—	—
1961–62	San Francisco Seals	WHL	70	30	55	85	4	2	1	0	1	0
1962–63	Los Angeles Blades	WHL	67	33	43	76	28	3	2	1	3	2
1963–64	Los Angeles Blades	WHL	59	13	20	33	25	6	2	2	4	0
1964–65	Red Deer Ruslters	AIHA	—	—	—	—	—	—	—	—	—	—
1964–65	Lacombe Rockets	CAHL	—	—	—	—	—	—	—	—	—	—
1965–66	Lacombe Rockets	ASHL	30	12	10	22	59	4	2	2	4	0
1965–66	Drumheller Rockets	Al-Cup	—	—	—	—	—	16	4	4	8	2
1966–67	Edmonton Nuggets	WCSHL	25	7	17	24	26	8	4	3	7	10
1967–68	Edmonton Nuggets	WCSHL	—	2	4	6	6	—	3	6	9	6
1968–69	Edmonton Monarchs	ASHL	30	8	25	33	36	6	0	7	7	2
AHL totals			707	241	349	590	435	97	39	53	92	92
NHL totals			99	10	11	21	19	—	—	—	—	—
