= Douglas Bradshaw =

Canadian Air Force officer (1912–1996)

- Born: 15 May 1912; Ottawa, Ontario
- Died: 1 October 1996 (aged 84)
- Allegiance: Canada
- Branch: RCAF
- Rank: Air Commodore
- Commands: No. 420 Squadron "Snowy Owl"; Royal Military College of Canada
- Awards: DFC; CD
- Other work: President of Confederation College

Air Commodore Douglas Bradshaw, DFC, CD, ADC (15 May 1912 – 1 October 1996) was a Canadian Air Commodore and educator. He was the Commandant of the Royal Military College of Canada from 1954 to 1957. He was the first president of Confederation College of Applied Arts and Technology from March 6, 1967, to 1974.

== Education ==
Douglas Alexander Ransome Bradshaw was born on May 15, 1912, in Ottawa, Ontario (ON). He was educated in London, Ontario. He graduated from the Royal Military College of Canada in Kingston, Ontario, in 1934, student # 2140.

== Military career ==
He was commissioned in the Royal Canadian Dragoons. He transferred to the RCAF in 1935. He received his pilot's license in 1936. He served as a flying instructor at Camp Borden, Ontario from 1935 to 1939. In December 1941, he was posted overseas. From March 1942 until April 1943, Wing Commander Bradshaw commanded 420 Snowy Owl Squadron. During this time, Bradshaw led his squadron in some of the first 1000 plane bomber raids into Germany.

At the end of World War II, Group Captain Bradshaw served at RCAF headquarters in Ottawa as Director of Air Operations. He was promoted to the rank of Air Commodore in January 1953. He served as Chief of Training for the RCAF. He returned to RMC in Kingston as Commandant and ADC to the Governor-General (1947–54). He served as Deputy Air Officer Commanding (Operations) at Air Defense Command Headquarters, St. Hubert, Quebec in 1957. In November 1959, he was appointed Deputy for Operations for Northern NORAD Region Headquarters, in St. Hubert, Quebec. He was appointed Chief Staff Officer at the RCAF's No. 1 Air in July 1961.

== Awards ==
He was awarded the DFC effective June 3, 1943, for his skill and bravery as a pilot. He led 420 Snowy Owl Squadron on many risky and dangerous sorties to heavily defended enemy targets in Germany.

== Civilian career ==
Air Vice Marshal (ret`d) Douglas Bradshaw was the first president of Confederation College from March 6, 1967, to 1974. Confederation College was founded as a trade school in 1967, during the formation of Ontario's college system. His vision of an aviation program in the north was implemented in the college's Aviation Centre of Excellence.

== Legacy ==
He died on 1 October 1996. In his memory, the Douglas Bradshaw Athletic Achievement Award is presented to a graduating student, having the most improvement in and contribution to athletics and whose quality of spirit and competitive drive contributed to the overall success of the Confederation College Athletic program.

Academic offices
Preceded by Commodore Desmond Piers	Commandant of the Royal Military College of Canada; 1954-1957	Succeeded by Brigadier-General Donald Agnew
