= Port Arthur Collegiate Institute =

Former high school and current law school in Thunder Bay, Ontario

Coordinates: 48°26′16″N 89°13′41″W

Location
- 401 Red River Road; Thunder Bay, Ontario; Canada

Information
- Type: High school
- Established: 1909
- Status: Bora Laskin Faculty of Law (Lakehead University) Established 2013. Renamed September 2014.
- Closed: 2007
- School district: Lakehead District School Board
- Colours: Red and White
- Mascot: Redmen
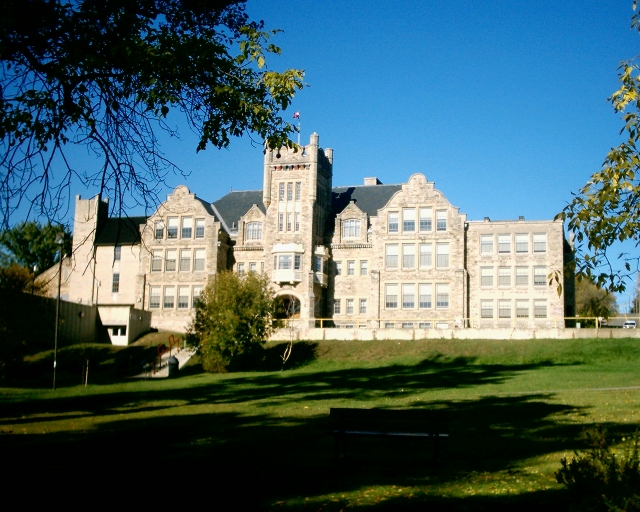

Port Arthur Collegiate Institute was a collegiate institute operated by the Lakehead District School Board in Thunder Bay, Ontario from 1910 to 2007. The building was designated a historic building in 1984 and is located at the west end of Waverly Park. The school's teams were named "PACI Redmen". Its amenities included a gymnasium, a 200-seat theatre, a large library and a modern music room. The building was granted Historical Heritage Site status in 1983, and was transferred to Lakehead University in 2008. After extensive renovations, the building became home to Lakehead's Faculty of Law, and welcomed its inaugural class in September 2013.

The original Port Arthur High School was opened on January 8, 1889. The cornerstone of the new building was laid by James Conmee on July 7, 1909. The building was designed by architect Henry Simpson in the Queen Anne style using Simpson Island Stone, and opened on September 6, 1910. Four more classrooms were added in 1925, and a large gymnasium was added in 1974.

The first Vox Studentium was published in 1915. The Principal was William B.L. Howell, staff Messrs Cranston, Milne, Rosevear, and Whiddon and Misses Aitcheson and Cloney. Howell had been appointed principal of the high school in 1904, succeeding Andrew McCulloch.

In 2007, students from Port Arthur Collegiate Institute were relocated to Hillcrest High School when their school closed. Hillcrest High School closed in 2009, and in September of that year students will attend Superior Collegiate and Vocational Institute.

In 2013, Lakehead University's Bora Laskin Faculty of Law opened up in the old Port Arthur Collegiate Institute, after extensive renovations.

== School Song ==
The school song was titled Cheer! Cheer! For P.A.C.I, and was written to the score of the Notre Dame Victory March

The Lyrics are follows:

Cheer Cheer for P A C I
Raise up the anthem, she'll never die
Our great rampart on the hill
Has never fallen, never will
Call us the Redmen
Call us the Free
Go on the field and get victory
Raise the banner, hold it high
For Good Ol' P A C I

== See also ==
- Education in Thunder Bay, Ontario
