= Negahneewin College =

Educational institution in Ontario, Canada

- Motto: "Leading the Way"
- Affiliations: Confederation College
- Undergraduates: university, and continuing education students
- Location: Thunder Bay, Ontario, Canada; 48.4026°N 89.2676°W
- Website: negahneewin

Negahneewin College is a tertiary education institution aimed at the indigenous people in Northwestern Ontario, Canada. Aboriginal institutes partner with colleges and universities to offer students degree programs, apprenticeships, certificate programs and diploma programs.

Negahneewin is an Anishnawbe word that means "leading the way". Negahneewin College of Academic & Community Development is a college "within and throughout" Confederation College in Thunder Bay.

== Programs ==
Diploma Programs

- Aboriginal Law and Advocacy

General Arts and Science Certificate Programs

- Native Child & Family
- Aboriginal Transition
- General Arts and Science
- Pre-Health Sciences
- Pre-Technology
