= Ron Busniuk =

Canadian ice hockey player (1948–2024)

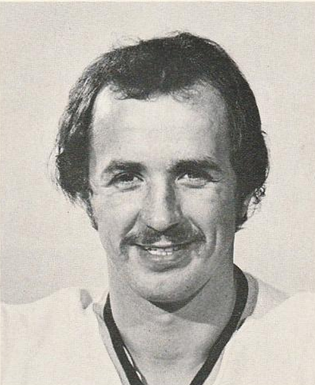
- Born: August 13, 1948 Fort William, Ontario, Canada
- Died: March 8, 2024 (aged 75) Thunder Bay, Ontario, Canada
- Height: 5 ft 11 in (180 cm)
- Weight: 180 lb (82 kg; 12 st 12 lb)
- Position: Centre
- Shot: Right
- Played for: Buffalo Sabres; Minnesota Fighting Saints; New England Whalers; Edmonton Oilers
- NHL draft: Undrafted
- Playing career: 1970–1978

Ronald Edward Busniuk (August 13, 1948 – March 8, 2024) was a Canadian professional ice hockey player. He played six games in the National Hockey League, all with the Buffalo Sabres, during 1973 and 1974. Busniuk then moved to the WHA, playing a total of four full seasons with the Minnesota Fighting Saints, New England Whalers and Edmonton Oilers between 1974 and 1978. Before turning professional Busniuk played NCAA hockey for the University of Minnesota Duluth Bulldogs and was an All-American his senior year. After graduation, he played in the AHL with the Nova Scotia Voyageurs and the Cincinnati Swords. He was named to the AHL First All-Star Team.

After retiring as a player, Busniuk became a coach. He led the Thunder Bay Twins Senior Hockey Team to two consecutive championships in the 1980s. He was later inducted into the Northern Ontario Sports Hall of Fame and the University of Minnesota Duluth Athletic Hall of Fame.

Ron Busniuk was the older brother of Mike Busniuk, who also played in the NHL. Ron Busniuk died in Thunder Bay on March 8, 2024, at the age of 75.

== Career statistics ==
=== Regular season and playoffs ===
			Regular season					Playoffs
Season	Team	League	GP	G	A	Pts	PIM	GP	G	A	Pts	PIM
1964–65	Fort William Kings	TBAHA	—	—	—	—	—	—	—	—	—	—
1964–65	Fort William Canadiens	TBJHL	4	1	0	1	0	—	—	—	—	—
1965–66	Fort William Canadiens	TBJHL	30	15	17	42	28	—	—	—	—	—
1966–67	Fort William Canadiens	M-Cup	—	—	—	—	—	16	9	11	20	41
1967–68	University of Minnesota-Duluth	WCHA	28	10	10	20	39	—	—	—	—	—
1968–69	University of Minnesota-Duluth	WCHA	29	7	20	27	16	—	—	—	—	—
1969–70	University of Minnesota-Duluth	WCHA	28	8	20	28	73	—	—	—	—	—
1970–71	Montreal Voyageurs	AHL	59	11	9	20	136	3	0	1	1	10
1971–72	Nova Scotia Voyageurs	AHL	67	13	13	26	133	15	3	5	8	74
1972–73	Buffalo Sabres	NHL	1	0	0	0	9	—	—	—	—	—
1972–73	Cincinnati Swords	AHL	71	5	34	39	205	15	1	7	8	39
1973–74	Buffalo Sabres	NHL	5	0	3	3	4	—	—	—	—	—
1973–74	Cincinnati Swords	AHL	68	7	24	31	146	5	1	1	2	8
1974–75	Minnesota Fighting Saints	WHA	73	2	21	23	176	12	2	1	3	63
1975–76	Minnesota Fighting Saints	WHA	59	2	11	13	150	—	—	—	—	—
1975–76	New England Whalers	WHA	11	0	3	3	55	17	0	2	2	14
1975–76	Nova Scotia Voyageurs	AHL	—	—	—	—	—	1	0	0	0	4
1976–77	New England Whalers	WHA	55	1	9	10	141	—	—	—	—	—
1976–77	Edmonton Oilers	WHA	29	2	2	4	83	5	0	2	2	37
1977–78	Edmonton Oilers	WHA	59	2	18	20	157	5	0	0	0	18
WHA totals			286	9	64	73	762	39	2	5	7	132
NHL totals			6	0	3	3	13	—	—	—	—	—

== Awards and honours ==
Award	Year
All-WCHA First Team	1969–70
AHCA West All-American	1969–70
