= St. Ignatius High School (Thunder Bay) =

Location
- 285 Gibson Street; Thunder Bay, Ontario, P7A 2J6; Canada
- Coordinates: 48°27′10″N 89°11′49″W

Information
- School type: High school
- School board: Thunder Bay Catholic District School Board
- President: Olivia McDermott
- Principal: Khristopher Bragnalo
- Grades: 9-12
- Language: English
- Colours: Red, white and black
- Mascot: Falcon
- Rivals: St. Patrick High School; Hammarskjold High School; Westgate Collegiate & Vocational Institute; Superior Collegiate and Vocational Institute; École secondaire catholique de la Vérendrye
- Website: www.tbcschools.ca/st-ignatius

St. Ignatius High School is a Catholic high school located in the north end of Thunder Bay, Ontario. It is part of the Thunder Bay Catholic District School Board, and its amenities include a chapel, comprehensive science labs, computer labs, custom-designed music room, electronic media studios, fully equipped library, nutrition studies lab, physical education facilities, student resource areas, technology rooms (automotive, manufacturing(welding/metal shop), construction(woodworking), drafting), and a theatre arts rooms with an auditorium.

The facility offers the Advanced Placement, and has ranked 133rd out of 740 Ontario High Schools. St. Ignatius ranked 1st in Thunder Bay.

The current principal is Khristopher Bragnalo, and vice principals are Patricia Del Paggio and Michael Savioli. The school chaplain is Joanna Lacaria. The Student Council President is Olivia McDermott. The school mascot is the Falcon. Unlike schools in the public system, students at St. Ignatius are required to wear uniforms; the uniform consists of a white or burgundy crested top, a burgundy crested vest or a grey crested sweatshirt and a pair of solid-black bottoms.

== History ==
St. Ignatius High School was originally built on 159 Clayte St in the early 1960s. However, in 1990 Lakeview High School (Lakehead District School Board) closed its doors as a public high school. Thunder Bay Catholic District School Board purchased the facility for only one dollar in a government auction. The school was transferred to the newly purchased Lakeview High School facility while the Board converted the older Clayte St building into Bishop Gallagher Senior Elementary.

In 2008, multiple renovations were made to the Lakeview building. This included a newly renovated cafeteria with an enclosed courtyard and also the addition of a new auditorium.

== See also ==
- Education in Ontario
- List of secondary schools in Ontario
- Education in Thunder Bay, Ontario
- Thunder Bay Catholic District School Board
