= Collegiate institute =

School of secondary or higher education

A collegiate institute is an institution that provides either secondary or post-secondary education, dependent on where the term is used. In Canada, the term is used to describe institutions that provide secondary education, while the word is used to describe a post-secondary institutions in the United States.

The term has fallen out of use throughout most of North America, except in the Canadian province of Ontario, which continues to use the term in the names of their secondary schools. Variations of the term also see use in other parts of Canada, with select areas of western Canada using the term collegiate in the names of their secondary schools.

== Canada ==
The term collegiate institute originally referred to a distinct type of secondary school in several provinces in Canada. However, the term has since transformed as a synonym for an institution that provides secondary education. The term is most prominent in Ontario, although the term was also used in several other areas in Canada.

=== Ontario ===
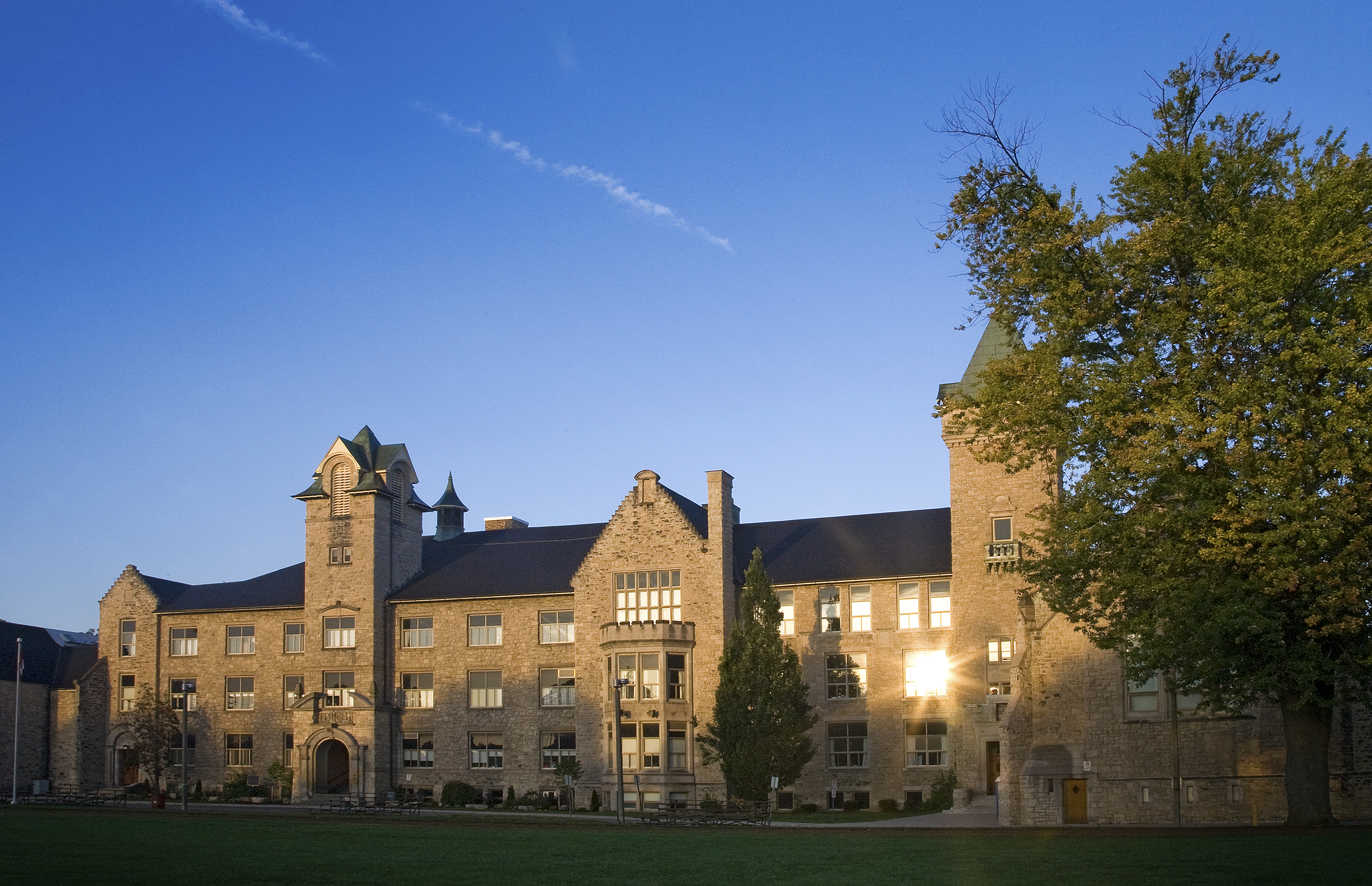
Galt Collegiate Institute and Vocational School was the first institution to be designated a Collegiate Institute by the province of Ontario.

In Ontario, collegiate institute originally referred to a distinct type of secondary school within the province's parallel streams of secondary education. The parallel school system was not extended to the separate school systems in Ontario. After the parallel streams were merged into one stream, the term continues to see use in Ontario, used to refer to any secular public institution that provides secondary education.

In 1871, the province of Ontario set up two parallel secondary education systems that included collegiate institutes and high school. Collegiate institutes offered education in the arts, classics, and the humanities, including Greek and Latin, for university-bound students. Conversely, high school referred to secondary institutions that offered vocational and science programs for those planning to enter the workforce upon graduation. While the parallel school system was in place, secondary institutions could only be elevated to the status of a collegiate institutes when it reached the prescribed number of teachers, and students; and when it fully complied with the standards set the Department of Education (renamed the Ministry of Education in 1972). Galt Collegiate and Vocational Institute was the first secondary institution elevated to a collegiate institute, in 1871.

It was quite quickly realized that the division did not work very well. Over time, high schools responded to students' needs and increasingly offered the arts courses that were essential for the workforce. At the same time, as universities began teaching science and engineering, so did the collegiate institutes. Within a decade, the distinctions between the two systems were greatly blurred, and eventually, the two systems were merged in to a single secondary school system. After the merger of the two systems in Ontario, the terms Collegiate Institute, High School, and Secondary School were all used synonymously with one another to refer to an institution of secondary education.

The prominence of the term varies dependent on the area. In some school boards, including Lakehead District School Board, and Toronto District School Board, almost all secondary schools are named Collegiate Institute. In contrast, some school boards, like the Hamilton-Wentworth District School Board, operate no secondary school that use the term in its name. However, the majority of school boards in Ontario continue to use all three terms (Collegiate Institute, High School, and Secondary School) in the names of their secondary schools.

=== Other provinces ===
The term also saw use in Western Canada, with Alberta, Manitoba, and Saskatchewan adopting Ontario's parallel school system in the late-19th and early 20th centuries. However, after the parallel system was ended in those provinces, the majority of institutions that were designated as collegiate institutions were closed, or renamed. However, several secondary schools in Western Canada continue to use the term Collegiate Institute, including Lethbridge Collegiate Institute in Lethbridge, Alberta; Mennonite Brethren Collegiate Institute in Winnipeg, Manitoba; and Prince Albert Collegiate Institute in Prince Albert, Saskatchewan.

In the cities of Saskatoon, and Regina, the term survives as Collegiate, which is found in the names of most public secondary schools and some separate secondary schools in those two cities. That contrasts the rest of Saskatchewan, where the most common name for secondary school is High School. Similar phrases, like collège, are also used to refer to secondary schools in Quebec.

== United States ==
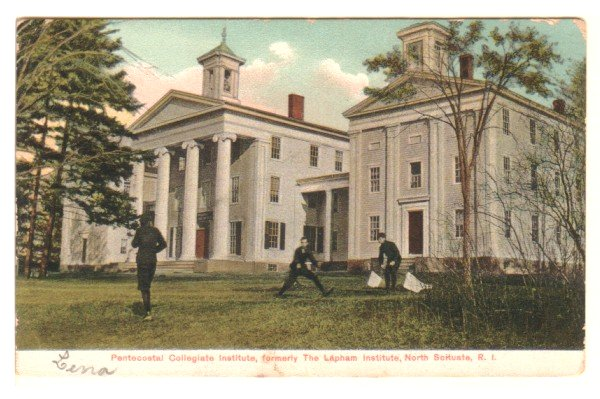
Pentecostal Collegiate Institute at the Rhode Island campus, c. 1905

In the United States, the term has largely fallen into disuse. Collegiate institutes in the United States were, for the most part, colleges, and even the first name of Yale University when founded in 1701 was a similar-sounding Collegiate School. However, the US definition of a college also differs from that of other countries and has been based primarily on the liberal arts college model of higher education.

Two examples of collegiate institutes in the United States before the term fell out of use are the Oberlin Collegiate Institute of Ohio, now Oberlin College, and the Pentecostal Collegiate Institute of New York and Rhode Island, now the Eastern Nazarene College of Massachusetts. Both were founded as postsecondary institutions (in 1833 and 1900, respectively), but the latter would drop its college curriculum and exist as a college preparatory school from 1902 to 1918, which demonstrates the flexibility of the term collegiate institute.

Partly because the term institute holds some ambiguity, many such schools would later change their names to use college instead of collegiate institute to represent their nature and mission more accurately, and the term "collegiate institute" would see little use after the early 20th century.

== United Kingdom ==
A collegiate school is a term adopted by some older independent secondary schools which were academically orientated with a goal to prepare pupils for college and university admission.
