= Aviation Centre of Excellence =

Confederation College - School of Aviation
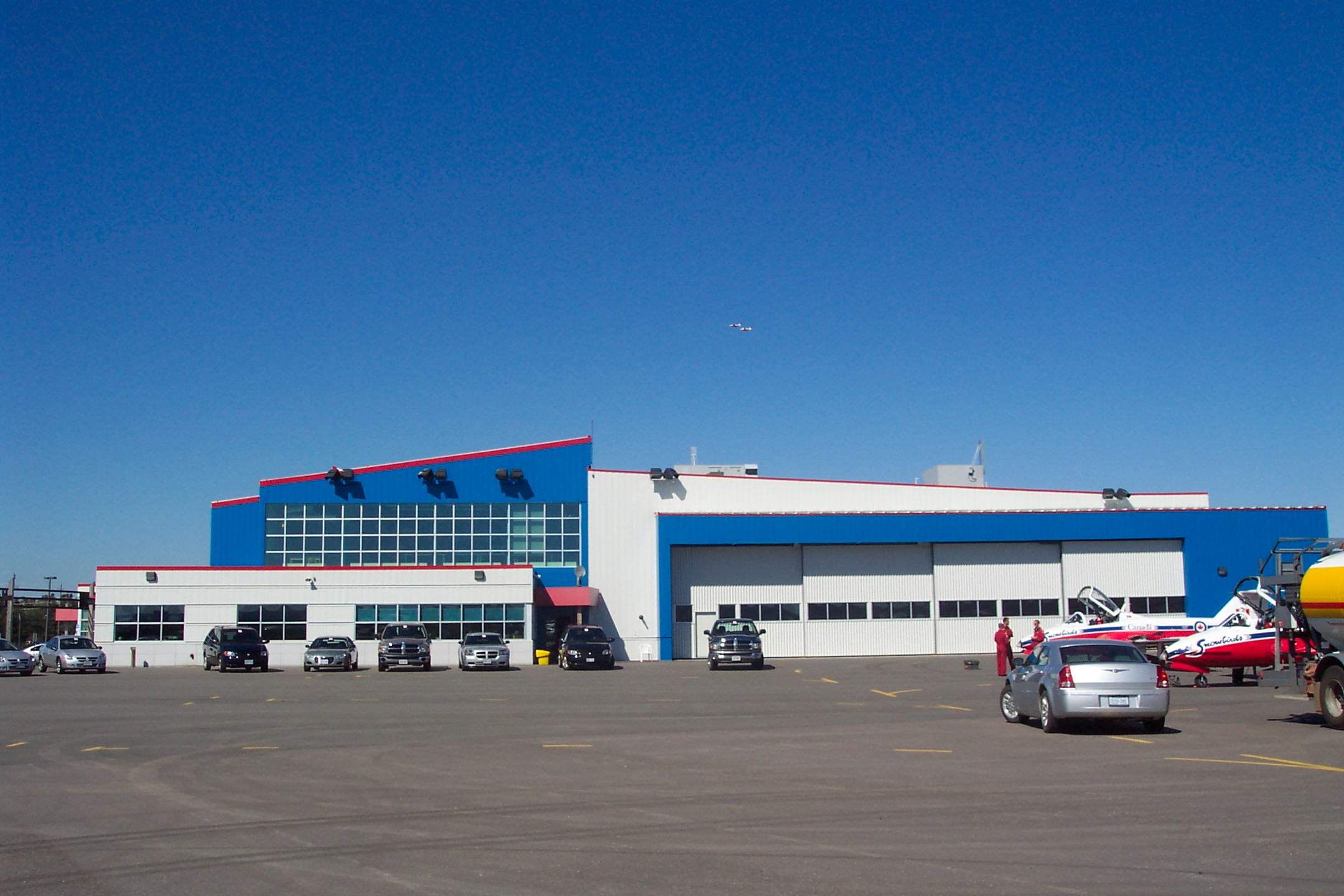

Location
- 2003 Derek Burney Drive; Thunder Bay, Ontario; Canada
- Coordinates: 48°22′41″N 89°18′53″W

Information
- Established: 2003
- Principal: Matthew Bunn; Associate Dean - School of Aviation
- Faculty: 28
- Enrollment: 250-300
- Colours: Blue and white
- Website: www.confederationcollege.ca/aviation

The Aviation Centre of Excellence (ACE) is the aviation department facility for Confederation College. The building consists of two hangars, classrooms, shops, labs, and offices for the three aviation programs available at the School of Aviation.

== Origin ==
In the late 1990s, Confederation College relocated its programs for Flight Management, Aircraft Maintenance, and Aerospace Manufacturing to one larger building where students would have new equipment and facilities.

Air Canada donated one of its retired Douglas DC-9-32 aircraft (C-FTLT) which arrived for the grand opening celebrations. The aircraft landed with Confederation College emblems in addition to the Air Canada tail paint. The aircraft would later be painted in classic Air Canada colours for a movie shoot. The aircraft eventually fell into disrepair, and would be scrapped in 2022. During the scrapping process, part of the aircraft caught fire, necessitating the response of airport fire trucks. One engine went to the school's maintenance program, while various signage, instruments, and small pieces of the fuselage were claimed by staff and students.

Construction of ACE began in 2002, and the building was completed in time for 2003 classes.

Previously, the college provided float ratings and Group 3 instrument ratings. Now, students graduate with only a Private and Commercial license.

Confederation College Aviation Centre of Excellence has been voted as the "Best Aviation College" in a poll by Aviation Canada.

== Location ==
The Aviation Centre of Excellence is located at Thunder Bay International Airport, the third-busiest airport in the province of Ontario. The structure, located on the north side of runway 25, is adjacent to the Ornge Hangar. The centre has an apron and taxiway to the runway.

== Programs ==
There are three full-time post-secondary programs offered at ACE.

- Aerospace Manufacturing Engineering Technician / Technologist
- Aviation Technician-Aircraft Maintenance
- Aviation Flight Management

The unofficial slogan of the Aviation Centre is "Build it, Fly it, Maintain it", relating to the three respective programs. ACE is heavily supported by companies such as Bombardier, Levaero, Jazz, Bearskin Airlines, and Wasaya Airways. ACE has hosted the world-renowned Canadian Forces Snowbirds several times and various pilots and mechanics on the team were alumni.

== Fleet ==
ACE has a fleet of thirteen aircraft used for flight training, consisting entirely of three different models of Cessna 172 aircraft. The fleet consists of 6 Cessna 172S models, 2 Cessna 172S G1000 models, and 5 Cessna 172S G1000 NXi models. The NXi aircraft are the newest in the fleet, having been delivered in late 2022, which allowed the college to phase out the 5 Cessna 172N model aircraft that had been built in the late 1970s. In addition, the school has four advanced flight training devices (or non-motion simulators).

In addition, ACE has a fleet of non-flying aircraft at that is used by the Aircraft Maintenance program. This includes:

- 1 McDonnell Douglas DC-9 engine
- 1 Bell 206 Helicopter
- 1 OH-58 Kiowa
- 1 Bell 47 Helicopter
- 4 Cessna 180
- 1 Piper Apache
- 1 Cessna 172
- 1 Mitsubishi MU-2
