= Confederation College =

College in Thunder Bay, Ontario, Canada

Coordinates: 48°24′10.07″N 89°15′59.98″W

- Established: 1967
- Affiliations: ACCC, CCAA, CSA, CBIE, CUP, Negahneewin College
- Endowment: $4.7 million
- President: Michelle Salo
- Students: 3,400 full-time, 4,205 part-time (2025: 2,201 FTEs)
- Location: P.O. Box 398, 1450 Nakina Drive, Thunder Bay, Ontario, Canada
- Campus: Urban
- Sports teams: Confederation Thunderhawks
- Colours: Red and Blue
- Website: www.confederationcollege.ca

Confederation College is a provincially funded college of applied arts and technology in Thunder Bay, Ontario, Canada. It was established in 1967, and has campuses in Dryden, Fort Frances, Greenstone, Kenora, Marathon, Sioux Lookout, and Red Lake. The college serves an area of approximately 550,000 square kilometres. It is the only public college servicing Northwestern Ontario.

Confederation's regional economic impact and contribution is valued at $634.4. million annually.

== History ==
Confederation College was founded as a trade school in 1967, during the formation of Ontario's college system.

Douglas Bradshaw was the first president of Confederation College from March 6, 1967 to 1974. His vision of an aviation program in the north was implemented in the College's Aviation Centre of Excellence. He died on 1 October 1996. In his memory, the Douglas Bradshaw Athletic Achievement Award is presented to a graduating student, having the most improvement in and contribution to athletics and whose quality of spirit and competitive drive contributed to the overall success of the college athletic program.

== Programs ==
The college offers a full range of programs and education services throughout the region, which includes over 60 full-time post-secondary programs, as well as part-time credit and non-credit courses, specialty programs for business and industry, pre-employment and skills training programs, apprenticeship programs and cooperative/workplace training programs.

Each year, Confederation College has approximately 3,400 full-time post-secondary students, 370 apprentices, 550 adult training students and 4,205 part-time post-secondary students, and many thousand students accessing continuing education courses. The student body includes a large population of Indigenous students and a growing population of international students.

=== Thunder Bay campus ===
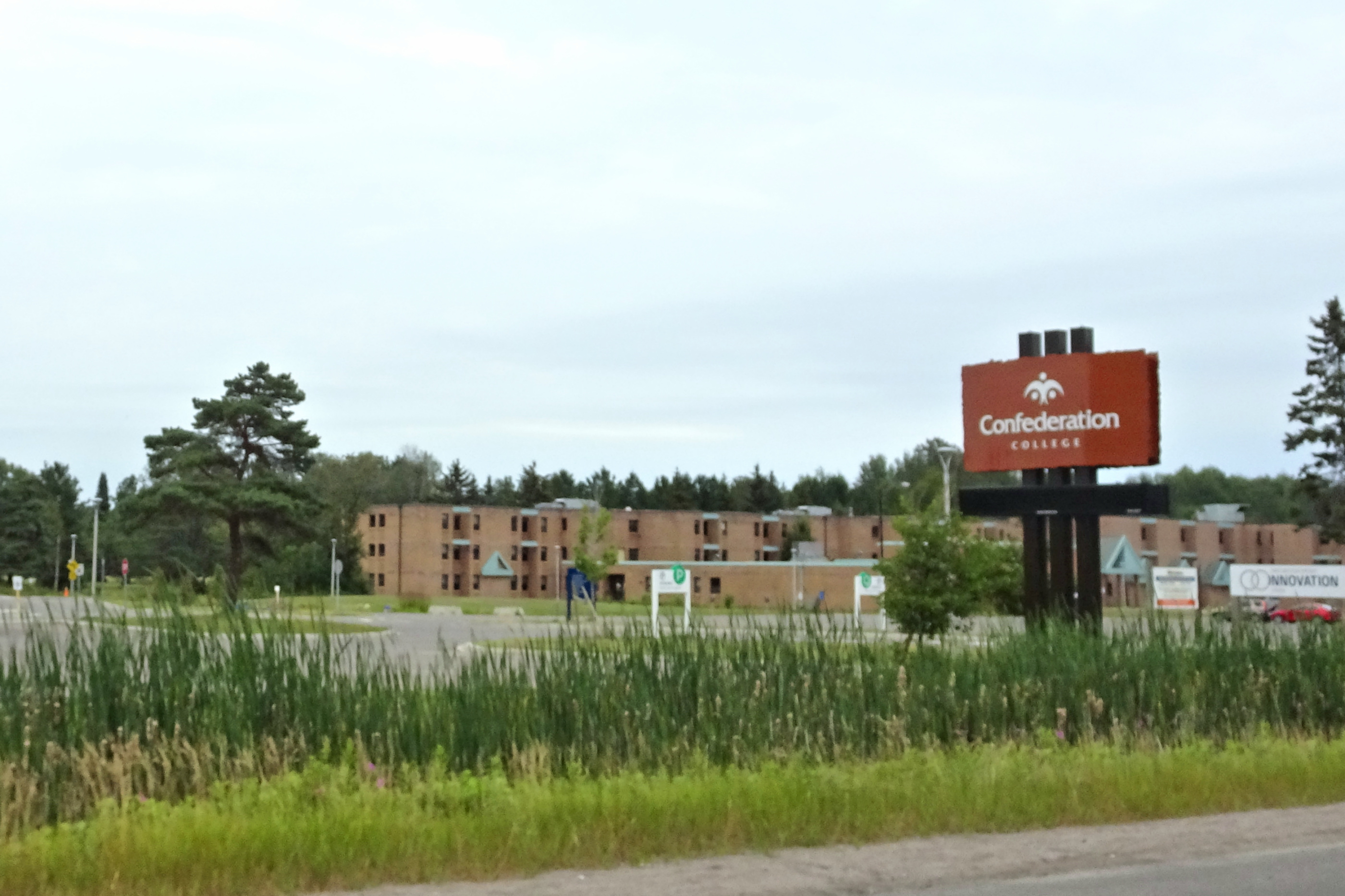
Confederation College in Thunder Bay

The Thunder Bay campus is Confederation College's main campus and is home to four campus buildings (Shuniah, Dorion, Neebing, and McIntyre), with apartment-style student residences in Spruce and Cedar Houses, and traditional dorm-style student residences in Sibley Hall. The Thunder Bay Art Gallery is on campus. At the Thunder Bay International Airport is the college's School of Aviation in a facility known as the Aviation Centre of Excellence. The Thunder Bay campus is also home to the Confederation College Student Union office.

=== Dryden campus ===
Confederation College's Dryden campus is located in Dryden, Ontario in the Dryden Regional Training & Cultural Centre. It offers programs in Business, Community Services, Engineering Technology, Health, Hospitality, Natural Resources and Skilled Trades, as well as preparatory programs.

=== Greenstone campus (Longlac) ===
Confederation College's Greenstone Campus is in Longlac, Ontario. It offers programs in Business, Community Services, Engineering Technology, Health and Hospitality, as well as preparatory programs.

=== Lake of the Woods campus (Kenora) ===
Confederation College's Lake of the Woods Campus is in Kenora, Ontario. It offers programs in Business, Community Services, Engineering Technology, Health, Hospitality, Natural Resources and Skilled Trades, as well as preparatory programs.

=== Northshore campus (Marathon) ===
Confederation College's Northshore campus is in Marathon, Ontario. It offers programs in Business, Community Services, Engineering Technology, Health, Hospitality and Natural Resources, as well as preparatory programs.

=== Rainy River District campus (Fort Frances) ===
Confederation College's Rainy River District campus is in Fort Frances, Ontario in Fort Frances' multi-use facility, which also houses Fort Frances High School and the Townshend Theatre.

It offers programs in Business, Community Services, Engineering Technology, Health, Hospitality, Natural Resources and Skilled Trades, as well as preparatory programs.

=== Red Lake campus ===
Confederation College's Red Lake campus is in Red Lake, Ontario in the Red Lake District High School. It offers programs in Business, Community Services, Engineering Technology, Health and Hospitality, as well as preparatory programs.

=== Sioux Lookout campus ===
Confederation College's Sioux Lookout campus is in Sioux Lookout, Ontario. It offers programs in Business, Community Services, Engineering Technology, Health and Hospitality, as well as preparatory programs.

=== Wawa campus ===
Confederation College's Wawa campus is in Wawa, Ontario in the Regional Training & Technology Centre. It offers programs in Business, Community Services, Engineering Technology, Health and Hospitality, as well as preparatory programs.

== Scholarships ==
Confederation College offers financial scholarships, bursaries, and awards to students to assist with their education costs. These are given out based on financial need, academic achievement or extra-curricular/community involvement. On average, student awards exceed $400,000 each year.

== Notable faculty ==
- Dave Siciliano (born 1946) — Canadian ice hockey coach and player, recreation leadership instructor

== See also ==
- Canadian government scientific research organizations
- Canadian industrial research and development organizations
- Canadian Interuniversity Sport
- Canadian university scientific research organizations
- Higher education in Ontario
- List of colleges in Ontario
- List of universities in Ontario
