= Lakehead District School Board =

School board in Ontario, Canada

Location
- 2135 Sills St., Thunder Bay, ON, P7E 5T2 Thunder Bay, Murillo, Kakabeka Falls, Whitefish Valley, Shuniah, Gorham and Ware, Ontario Canada

District information
- Type: Public
- Grades: K-12; Adult Education
- Superintendents: Michelle Probizanski, AJ Keene, Kirsti Alaksa
- Chair of the board: Ellen Chambers
- Director of education: Sherri-Lynne Pharand
- Schools: 26: 22 elementary, 3 secondary, 1 centre for adult studies
- Budget: CA$154 million (2022–2023)
- District ID: B28061

Students and staff
- Students: approx 11,000
- Teachers: 840 (2018)

Other information
- Chair of the Board: Ellen Chambers
- Director of Education: Sherri-Lynne Pharand
- Elected trustees: Vice Chair: Donica LeBlanc Patricia Johansen Ron Oikonen George Saarinen Ryan Sitch Trudy Tuchenhagen Leah Vanderwey Indigenous Trustee: Scottie Wemigwans Student Trustee: Morgann De Franceschi Indigenous Student Trustee: Emily Drake
- Website: www.lakeheadschools.ca

The Lakehead District School Board (known as English-language Public District School Board No. 6A prior to 1999) oversees all secular English-language public schools in the Thunder Bay CMA and the townships of Gorham and Ware in Ontario, Canada. It administers education at 22 elementary schools, 3 secondary schools and an adult education centre.

== District Schools ==
Elementary Schools

- Algonquin Avenue Public School
- Armstrong Public School
- C. D. Howe Public School
- Claude E. Garton Public School (French Immersion)
- Crestview Public School (Murillo)
- Ecole Gron Morgan Public School (French Immersion)
- Ecole Elsie MacGill Public School (English or French Immersion)
- Five Mile Public School
- Gorham and Ware Community School (Lappe)
- Kakabeka Falls Public School (Kakabeka Falls)
- Kingsway Park Public School
- McKellar Park Central Public School
- McKenzie Public School (Shuniah) (K–6)
- Nor'wester View Public School
- Ogden Community School
- St. James Public School
- Sherbrooke Public School
- Valley Central Public School
- Vance Chapman Public School
- Westmount Public School
- Whitefish Valley Public School (Whitefish Valley)
- Woodcrest Public School

Public Secondary Schools

- Hammarskjold High School (French Immersion)
- Superior Collegiate and Vocational Institute (IB)
- Westgate Collegiate & Vocational Institute (9–12)

Adult Education

- Lakehead Adult Education Centre

== Mascots ==
- Hammarskjold High School – Vikings
- Superior Collegiate and Vocational Institute – Gryphons
- Westgate Collegiate & Vocational Institute – Tigers
- Algonquin Avenue Public School – Gladiators
- Armstrong Public School – Eagles
- C. D. Howe Public School – Howlers
- Claude E. Garton Public School – Cougars
- Crestview Public School – Yellowjackets
- Ecole Gron Morgan Public School – Dragons
- Ecole Elsie MacGill Public School – Hurricanes
- Five Mile Public School – Falcons
- Gorham and Ware Public School – Wolves
- Kakabeka Falls Public School – Coyotes
- Kingsway Park Public School – Panthers
- McKellar Park Central Public School – Thunderhawks
- McKenzie Public School – Mustangs
- Nor'wester View Public School – Knights
- Ogden Community Public School – Otters
- St. James Public School – Polar Bears
- Sherbrooke Public School – Wildcats
- Valley Central Public School – Cougars
- Vance Chapman Public School – Vikings
- Westmount Public School – Wolves
- Whitefish Valley Public School – Eagles
- Woodcrest Public School – Wildcats

== Former Secondary Schools ==
- Fort William Collegiate Institute, 1907–2005
- Port Arthur Collegiate Institute, 1910–2007
- Selkirk Collegiate and Vocational Institute, 1931–1988 (St. Patrick High School as of 1988)
- Lakeview High School, 1957–1990 (St. Ignatius High School as of 1990)
- Hillcrest High School, 1928–2009
- Sir Winston Churchill Collegiate & Vocational Institute, 1965–2018
- Northwood High School, 1963–1996

== Controversies ==
- The former director Ian MacRae allegedly said inappropriate comments to staff members and "inappropriate physical contact" with a colleague. In spring of 2017, Ian MacRae allegedly requested communications staff members to remove the achievements of a staff member from the board website and said "he wished for bad things to happen to her." He also allegedly made a number of inappropriate comments about Indigenous people. He has been found guilty.
- In 2023, the school board filed a court order compelling Reddit to disclose contact information of at least two users who made posts about the board and staff, and to remove those posts.

== See also ==
- Education in Thunder Bay, Ontario
- Thunder Bay Catholic District School Board
- Conseil scolaire de district catholique des Aurores boréales
- List of school districts in Ontario
- List of high schools in Ontario
