= Donald Agnew =

Canadian general

- Born: October 25, 1897; Toronto, Canada
- Died: August 7, 1968 (aged 70)
- Military career
- Allegiance: Canada
- Branch: Canadian Army
- Rank: Brigadier General
- Commands: Royal Military College of Canada; 7th Military District; 1st Canadian Anti-Aircraft Brigade; No. 1 Canadian Artillery Reinforcement Unit
- Conflicts: First World War; Second World War
- Awards: Companion of the Order of the Bath; Commander of the Order of the British Empire; Canadian Forces' Decoration

Brigadier General Donald Robert Agnew, CB, CBE, CD (October 25, 1897 – August 7, 1968) was a Canadian general and educator.

== Family ==
Agnew was born in Toronto on October 25, 1897, to Major John Agnew and Daisy Edith Stocks. Following the death of Daisy in 1902, John Agnew married Elizabeth Dickenson of Toronto. John Agnew, of the 127th Battalion, Canadian Infantry, served overseas in the First World War, along with his three sons, Lieutenant Donald Agnew, of the Canadian Reserve Artillery, Lieutenant Ellis Agnew, 351 Brigade RFA, and Lieutenant Ronald Agnew, of the Royal Canadian Navy. While her husband and sons were overseas during the war, Elizabeth Agnew moved temporarily to Hamilton, Ontario.

Agnew was educated at the University of Toronto Schools. He studied at the Royal Military College of Canada, student #1137 in 1915.

== Military career ==
Agnew returned to the Royal Military College of Canada (RMC) in Kingston as commandant and aide-de-camp to the governor-general (1947–54). At the time, RMC was the only military college with a four-year course; the course was 15 percent military content. During this period, the New One Hundred Opening Ceremonies were held (20 September 1948). He devised a new system of organization at RMC consisting of a vice-commandant as director of studies, to coordinate the military and academic training at RMC and to represent RMC at the National Conference of Canadian Universities as the equivalent of a vice-principal. The commandant personally commanded the cadet battalion. A staff-adjutant issued the routine orders.

Agnew presided over the New One Hundred Opening Ceremonies at the RMC on 20 September 1948. He inaugurated the Old Brigade, for alumni celebrating 50 years since they entered one of the Canadian Royal Military Colleges in 1950. He was photographed as Commandant of RMC when Princess Elizabeth and Prince Philip visited on 12 October 1951.

== Major appointments ==
	Cadet at RMC
1940–1942	Commanding officer 14th Field Regiment Royal Canadian Artillery 1915–18
1942	Commanding officer No. 1 Canadian Artillery Reinforcement Unit, England
1942–44	Commanding officer 1st Canadian Anti-Aircraft Brigade, England
1942–45	Director-general of Anti-Aircraft Artillery
1945–1947	District officer commanding 7th Military District
1947–54	Commandant of Royal Military College of Canada in Kingston, Ontario, and ADC to the Governor-General
1954–1957	Director of Imperial War Graves Commission in North-West Europe
1958	Retired

Academic offices
Preceded by Douglas Bradshaw	Commandant of the Royal Military College of Canada; 1947–1954	Succeeded by J.F.M. Whiteley
