= Westgate Collegiate & Vocational Institute =

Location
- 707 South James Street; Thunder Bay, Ontario, P7E 2V9; Canada; 48°22′25″N 89°17′26″W

Information
- School type: High school
- Motto: Latin: Semper Solum Optimum (Always, Only the Best)
- Founded: 1960
- School board: Lakehead Public Schools
- Principal: Ryan McDonnell
- Grades: 9–12
- Language: English
- Colours: Black and Orange
- Mascot: Roary the Tiger
- Team name: Westgate Tigers
- Rivals: Hammarskjold High School; St. Patrick High School; St. Ignatius High School
- Website: westgate.lakeheadschools.ca

Westgate Collegiate & Vocational Institute is a Canadian high school in Thunder Bay, Ontario. It is one of three secondary schools in the Lakehead Public Schools system, after the closure of Sir Winston Churchill Collegiate & Vocational Institute in June 2019. September 11.

== Athletics ==
Westgate is home to an extensive athletics department. Students can compete in cycling, Canadian football, basketball, volleyball, track and field, cross country running, soccer, golf, cross-country skiing, tennis, badminton, curling, wrestling, and cheerleading. Westgate's Cycling team has won 10 SSSAA titles in a row.

In 2006, Westgate's Senior and Junior Football Teams won the SSSAA championship with the Seniors going to Toronto to compete in the OFSAA Northern Bowl. This was the school's first junior SSSAA football championship in 25 years. In 2007, Westgate's Senior Football team successfully defended their SSSAA title and the team won the Northern Bowl, a first for the school.

In the 2011–12 season, Westgate's Junior Football team completed a perfect, undefeated season and won their first SSSAA title in five years.

In 2012, Westgate Junior Boys Basketball team also went undefeated throughout the whole season and won their first SSSAA championship since 1992.

== Notable alumni ==
- Dave Siciliano, ice hockey player and coach

== See also ==
- Education in Ontario
- List of secondary schools in Ontario
