= Sir Winston Churchill Collegiate and Vocational Institute =

Location
- 130 West Churchill Drive; Thunder Bay, Ontario, P7C 1V5; Canada; 48°23′20″N 89°16′57″W

Information
- School type: High school
- Motto: Trojan Pride, Trojan Power, Trojan Promise
- Founded: 1965
- Closed: 2018
- School board: Lakehead Public Schools
- Principal: David Isherwood
- Grades: 7-8 (Elementary) 9-12 (High)
- Language: English
- Colours: Maroon, grey and white
- Mascot: Troy The Trojan
- Team name: Churchill Trojans
- Website: www.lakeheadschools.ca/tag/churchill/

Sir Winston Churchill Collegiate and Vocational Institute was a high school in Thunder Bay, Ontario. It was part of the Lakehead District School Board system. The school was opened in 1966. Students began attending in the fall of 1966 but the building was not completed until the end of the same year. Students enrolled in Sir Winston Churchill attended classes in the morning only at nearby Northwood Technical school while Northwood students attended in the afternoon. The school was commonly referred to as SWC. The school was the only one with a pool, which was later sold to the city. SWC was known for its academics and sport teams.

The school was closed in 2018, and demolished in April 2019. A French-immersion elementary school, Elsie MacGill Public School, sits on the site of the former football field.

Sir Winston Churchill Collegiate & Vocational Institute was the only school in Thunder Bay that offered the internationally recognized and academically challenging International Baccalaureate Program. The program moved to Superior Collegiate and Vocational Institute. Ontario curriculum students were sent to attend Westgate Collegiate and Vocational Institute.

Sir Winston Churchill was also the only high school to provide grade 7–12 education in the Lakehead District School Board.

== See also ==
- List of high schools in Ontario
